= List of Hawthorn Football Club seasons =

The Hawthorn Football Club is a professional Australian rules football club that competes in the Australian Football League (AFL).

This article lists all seasons dating back to Hawthorn's inaugural season in the Metropolitan Junior Football Association (MJFA, later MAFA), followed by the Victorian Football Association (VFA) and Victorian/Australian Football League (VFL/AFL).

Hawthorn has also had a women's team since 2018, currently competing in the AFL Women's (AFLW) and formerly in the VFL Women's (VFLW).

== Men's ==
Correct as of the end of 2026.

Premiers	Runner–up	Minor premiers	Finals appearance	Wooden spoon	Coleman Medalist	Brownlow Medalist

=== Seniors ===
Year	League	W	L	D	Finish	Finals	Coach	Captain	Leading goalkicker	Peter Crimmins Medal	Ref
1902	MJFA	6	10	0	6th						
1903	MJFA	4	12	0	7th						
1904	MJFA	2	16	0	10th						
1905	MJFA	5	13	0	8th						
1906	MJFA	5	13	0	8th			Tom Ferguson			
1907	MJFA	10	6	2	3rd			Eastman			
1908	MJFA	6	12	0	7th						
1909	MJFA	5	13	0	7th						
1910	MJFA	3	15	0	8th						
1911	MJFA	3	15	0	9th						
1912	MAFA	10	8	0	5th			Hughie Callan			
1913	MAFA	4	14	0	9th						
1914	VFA	3	14	1	9th		Alf Gough	Alf Gough	Arthur Fewster		
1915	VFA	1	12	0	10th		Alf Gough	Joe Larkin	Arthur Fewster		
1916	VFA in recess due to World War I										
1917	VFA in recess due to World War I										
1918	Hawthorn didn't compete										
1919	VFA	8	10	0	6th		Jack McKenzie	Len Gibb	Len Gibb		
1920	VFA	6	12	0	8th		Edwin Alley; Arthur Rademacher	Edwin Alley; Frank Rigaldi	Charlie Fehring		
1921	VFA	7	10	0	6th		Arthur Rademacher	Jim Jackson	Cyril Gambetta		
1922	VFA	10	7	1	6th		Bill Walton	Arthur Rademacher	Arthur Pearson		
1923	VFA	11	7	0	4th	Lost Semi-final (Port Melbourne) 67–95	Bill Walton	Bill Walton	Fred Latham		
1924	VFA	10	8	0	6th		Bill Walton	Bill Walton	Hec Yeomans		
1925	VFL	3	14	0	12th		Alec Hall	Jim Jackson	Les Woodford	Fred Finch	
1926	VFL	3	14	1	11th		Dan Minogue	Paddy Burke; Dan Minogue	Bert Hyde		
1927	VFL	1	17	0	12th		Dan Minogue	Clarrie Lethlean	Bert Hyde	Ern Utting	
1928	VFL	0	18	0	12th		Bert Sutton	Bert Sutton	Bert Hyde	Bob Sellers	
1929	VFL	4	14	0	10th		Albert Chadwick	Albert Chadwick	Bert Hyde	Ern Utting	
1930	VFL	6	12	0	10th		John Harris	John Harris	Bert Hyde	Jack Sharpley	
1931	VFL	3	15	0	11th		John Harris	John Harris	Jack Ryan		
1932	VFL	3	15	0	12th		Jim Jackson	Bert Mills	Jack Ryan	Stan Spinks	
1933	VFL	3	15	0	11th		Arthur Rademacher; Bill Twomey Sr.	Bill Twomey Sr.	Ted Pool	Bert Mills	
1934	VFL	3	15	0	11th		Bill Twomey Sr.	Bert Mills	Jack Green	Ernie Loveless	
1935	VFL	5	13	0	10th		Ivan McAlpine	Ivan McAlpine	Jack Green	Bert Mills	
1936	VFL	6	12	0	9th		Ivan McAlpine	Ivan McAlpine	Norm Hillard	Leo Murphy	
1937	VFL	7	11	0	8th		Ivan McAlpine	Ivan McAlpine	Norm Hillard	Leo Murphy	
1938	VFL	4	14	0	11th		Ivan McAlpine	Bert Mills	Alby Naismith	Stan Spinks	
1939	VFL	5	12	1	10th		Len Thomas	Len Thomas	Alec Albiston	Bert Mills	
1940	VFL	7	11	0	9th		Bert Mills	Bert Mills	Alby Naismith	Andy Angwin	
1941	VFL	3	15	0	12th		Bert Mills	Bert Mills	Alec Albiston	Alec Albiston	
1942	VFL	1	14	0	11th		Roy Cazaly	Jack Carmody	Alec Albiston	Jack Barker	
1943	VFL	9	6	0	5th		Roy Cazaly	Bob Williams	Wally Culpitt	Jim Bohan	
1944	VFL	2	15	1	11th		Tommy Lahiff	Jim Bohan	Wally Culpitt	Jack Blackman	
1945	VFL	6	14	0	10th		Keith Shea	Keith Shea	Alec Albiston	Jim Bohan	
1946	VFL	3	16	0	12th		Keith Shea	Jim Bohan	Albert Prior	Alec Albiston	
1947	VFL	4	15	0	11th		Alec Albiston	Alec Albiston	Albert Prior	Wally Culpitt	
1948	VFL	5	14	0	11th		Alec Albiston	Alec Albiston	Albert Prior	Kevin Curran	
1949	VFL	3	16	0	12th		Alec Albiston	Alec Albiston	Albert Prior	Col Austen	
1950	VFL	0	18	0	12th		Bob McCaskill	Kevin Curran	Gordon Anderson	John Kennedy Sr.	
1951	VFL	4	14	0	11th		Bob McCaskill	Kevin Curran	Pat Cash Sr.	John Kennedy Sr.	
1952	VFL	5	14	0	11th		Bob McCaskill; Jack Hale	Peter O'Donohue	Jack McDonald	John Kennedy Sr.	
1953	VFL	3	15	0	12th		Jack Hale	Ted Fletcher	Kevin Coghlan	Ted Fletcher	
1954	VFL	8	10	0	9th		Jack Hale	Ted Fletcher	Kevin Coghlan	John Kennedy Sr.	
1955	VFL	8	10	0	8th		Jack Hale	John Kennedy Sr.	Kevin Coghlan	Graham Arthur	
1956	VFL	7	10	1	7th		Jack Hale	John Kennedy Sr.	John Peck	Roy Simmonds	
1957	VFL	11	7	0	3rd	Won Semi-final (Carlton) 71–48; Lost Preliminary final (Melbourne) 76–144	Jack Hale	John Kennedy Sr.	Terry Ingersoll	Alf Hughes	
1958	VFL	9	9	0	6th		Jack Hale	John Kennedy Sr.	John Peck	Graham Arthur	
1959	VFL	9	9	0	7th		Jack Hale	John Kennedy Sr.	Garry Young	Allan Woodley	
1960	VFL	11	7	0	5th		John Kennedy Sr.	Graham Arthur	Garry Young	Brendan Edwards	
1961	VFL	14	4	0	1st	Won Semi-final (Melbourne) 80–73; Won Grand Final (Footscray) 94–51	John Kennedy Sr.	Graham Arthur	John Peck	Ian Law	
1962	VFL	5	13	0	9th		John Kennedy Sr.	Graham Arthur	John Peck	Graham Arthur	
1963	VFL	13	4	1	1st	Lost Semi-final (Geelong) 82–101; Won Preliminary final (Melbourne) 77–68; Lost Grand Final (Geelong) 60–109	John Kennedy Sr.	Graham Arthur	John Peck	Ian Law	
1964	VFL	13	5	0	5th		Graham Arthur	Graham Arthur	John Peck	Ian Law	
1965	VFL	4	14	0	12th		Graham Arthur	Graham Arthur	John Peck	David Parkin	
1966	VFL	5	13	0	9th		Peter O'Donohue	Graham Arthur	John Peck	Ray Wilson	
1967	VFL	5	13	0	10th		John Kennedy Sr.	Graham Arthur	Peter Hudson	Bob Keddie	
1968	VFL	9	10	1	6th		John Kennedy Sr.	Graham Arthur	Peter Hudson	Peter Hudson	
1969	VFL	13	7	0	5th		John Kennedy Sr.	David Parkin	Peter Hudson	Bob Keddie	
1970	VFL	10	12	0	8th		John Kennedy Sr.	David Parkin	Peter Hudson	Peter Hudson	
1971	VFL	19	3	0	1st	Won Semi-final (St Kilda) 90–88; Won Grand Final (St Kilda) 82–75	John Kennedy Sr.	David Parkin	Peter Hudson	Leigh Matthews	
1972	VFL	13	9	0	6th		John Kennedy Sr.	David Parkin	Peter Knights	Leigh Matthews	
1973	VFL	11	11	0	7th		John Kennedy Sr.	David Parkin	Leigh Matthews	Don Scott	
1974	VFL	15	7	0	3rd	Lost Qualifying final (North Melbourne) 65–103; Won Semi-final (Collingwood) 138–88; Lost Preliminary final (North Melbourne) 51–56	John Kennedy Sr.	Peter Crimmins	Michael Moncrieff	Leigh Matthews	
1975	VFL	17	5	0	1st	Won Semi-final (North Melbourne) 82–71; Lost Grand Final (North Melbourne) 67–122	John Kennedy Sr.	Peter Crimmins	Leigh Matthews	Peter Knights	
1976	VFL	16	6	0	2nd	Won Qualifying final (North Melbourne) 103–83; Won Semi-final (Carlton) 87–70; Won Grand Final (North Melbourne) 100–70	John Kennedy Sr.	Don Scott	Michael Moncrieff	Leigh Matthews	
1977	VFL	17	5	0	2nd	Won Qualifying final (North Melbourne) 125–87; Lost Semi-final (Collingwood) 110–112; Lost Preliminary final (North Melbourne) 45–112	David Parkin	Don Scott	Peter Hudson	Leigh Matthews	
1978	VFL	16	6	0	2nd	Won qualifying final (Collingwood) 154–98; Won semi-final (North Melbourne) 87–73; Won Grand Final (North Melbourne) 121–103	David Parkin	Don Scott	Michael Moncrieff	Leigh Matthews	
1979	VFL	10	12	0	7th		David Parkin	Don Scott	Michael Moncrieff	Kelvin Moore	
1980	VFL	10	12	0	8th		David Parkin	Don Scott	Michael Moncrieff	Leigh Matthews	
1981	VFL	13	9	0	6th		Allan Jeans	Leigh Matthews	Leigh Matthews	Terry Wallace	
1982	VFL	17	5	0	2nd	Lost Qualifying final (Carlton) 105–1963; Won Semi-final (North Melbourne) 166–114; Lost Preliminary final (Carlton) 63–94	Allan Jeans	Leigh Matthews	Leigh Matthews	Leigh Matthews	
1983	VFL	15	7	0	2nd	Won Qualifying final (Fitzroy) 127–123; Won Semi-final (North Melbourne) 88–48; Won Grand Final (Essendon) 140–57	Allan Jeans	Leigh Matthews	Leigh Matthews	Terry Wallace	
1984	VFL	17	5	0	2nd	Won Qualifying final (Carlton) 122–92; Won Semi-final (Essendon) 113–105; Lost Grand Final (Essendon) 81–105	Allan Jeans	Leigh Matthews	Leigh Matthews	Russell Greene	
1985	VFL	15	6	1	3rd	Won Qualifying final (Footscray) 155–62; Lost Semi-final (Essendon) 62–102; Won Preliminary final (Footscray) 109–99; Lost Grand Final (Essendon) 92–170	Allan Jeans	Leigh Matthews	Dermott Brereton	Dermott Brereton	
1986	VFL	18	4	0	1st	Lost Semi-final (Carlton) 84–112; Won Preliminary final (Fitzroy) 110–54; Won Grand Final (Carlton) 110–68	Allan Jeans	Michael Tuck	Jason Dunstall	Gary Ayres	
1987	VFL	17	5	0	2nd	Won Qualifying final (Sydney) 156–57; Lost Semi-final (Carlton) 65–80; Won Preliminary final (Melbourne) 80–78; Lost Grand Final (Carlton) 71–104	Allan Jeans	Michael Tuck	Jason Dunstall	John Platten	
1988	VFL	19	3	0	1st	Won Semi-final (Carlton) 66–45; Won Grand Final (Melbourne) 152–56	Alan Joyce	Michael Tuck	Jason Dunstall	Jason Dunstall	
1989	VFL	19	3	0	1st	Won Semi-final (Essendon) 112–76; Won Grand Final (Geelong) 144–138	Allan Jeans	Michael Tuck	Jason Dunstall	Jason Dunstall	
1990	AFL	14	8	0	5th	Lost Elimination final (Melbourne) 64–73	Allan Jeans	Michael Tuck	Jason Dunstall	Andrew Collins	
1991	AFL	16	6	0	2nd	Won Qualifying final (West Coast) 124–101; Won Semi-final (Geelong) 95–93; Won Grand Final (West Coast) 139–86	Alan Joyce	Michael Tuck	Jason Dunstall	Ben Allan	
1992	AFL	14	8	0	5th	Lost Elimination final (West Coast) 87–100	Alan Joyce	Gary Ayres	Jason Dunstall	Jason Dunstall	
1993	AFL	13	7	0	4th	Lost Elimination final (Adelaide) 95–110	Alan Joyce	Gary Ayres	Jason Dunstall	Jason Dunstall	
1994	AFL	13	9	0	6th	Lost Qualifying final (North Melbourne) 91–114 (ET)	Peter Knights	Chris Langford	Jason Dunstall	John Platten	
1995	AFL	7	15	0	15th		Peter Knights	Jason Dunstall	Jason Dunstall	Darren Jarman	
1996	AFL	11	10	1	8th	Lost Qualifying final (Sydney) 84–90	Ken Judge	Jason Dunstall	Jason Dunstall	Paul Salmon	
1997	AFL	8	14	0	15th		Ken Judge	Jason Dunstall	Nick Holland	Paul Salmon	
1998	AFL	8	14	0	13th		Ken Judge	Jason Dunstall	Jason Dunstall	Shane Crawford	
1999	AFL	10	11	1	9th		Ken Judge	Shane Crawford	Aaron Lord	Shane Crawford	
2000	AFL	12	10	0	8th	Won Elimination final (Geelong) 92–83; Lost Semi-final (Kangaroos) 100–110	Peter Schwab	Shane Crawford	Nick Holland	Daniel Chick; Nick Holland	
2001	AFL	13	9	0	6th	Won Elimination final (Sydney) 129–74; Won Semi-final (Port Adelaide) 72–69; Lost Preliminary final (Essendon) 67–76	Peter Schwab	Shane Crawford	John Barker	Joel Smith	
2002	AFL	11	11	0	10th		Peter Schwab	Shane Crawford	Daniel Chick	Shane Crawford	
2003	AFL	12	10	0	9th		Peter Schwab	Shane Crawford	Nathan Thompson	Shane Crawford	
2004	AFL	4	18	0	15th		Peter Schwab; Donald McDonald	Shane Crawford	Nathan Thompson	Peter Everitt	
2005	AFL	5	17	0	14th		Alastair Clarkson	Richie Vandenberg	Mark Williams	Luke Hodge	
2006	AFL	9	13	0	11th		Alastair Clarkson	Richie Vandenberg	Mark Williams	Sam Mitchell	
2007	AFL	13	9	0	5th	Won Elimination final (Adelaide) 105–102; Lost Semi-final (Kangaroos) 60–93	Alastair Clarkson	Richie Vandenberg	Lance Franklin	Brad Sewell	
2008	AFL	17	5	0	2nd	Won Qualifying final (Western Bulldogs) 127–76; Won Semi-final (St Kilda) 118–64; Won Grand Final (Geelong) 115–89	Alastair Clarkson	Sam Mitchell	Lance Franklin	Lance Franklin	
2009	AFL	9	13	0	9th		Alastair Clarkson	Sam Mitchell	Lance Franklin	Sam Mitchell	
2010	AFL	12	9	1	7th	Lost Elimination final (Fremantle) 64–94	Alastair Clarkson	Sam Mitchell	Lance Franklin	Luke Hodge	
2011	AFL	18	4	0	3rd	Lost Qualifying final (Geelong) 67–98; Won Semi-final (Sydney) 122–86; Lost Preliminary final (Collingwood) 65–68	Alastair Clarkson	Luke Hodge	Lance Franklin	Sam Mitchell	
2012	AFL	17	5	0	1st	Won Qualifying final (Collingwood) 135–97; Won Preliminary final (Adelaide) 97–92; Lost Grand Final (Sydney) 81–91	Alastair Clarkson	Luke Hodge	Lance Franklin	Sam Mitchell	
2013	AFL	19	3	0	1st	Won Qualifying final (Sydney) 105–51; Won Preliminary final (Geelong) 102–97; Won Grand Final (Fremantle) 77–62	Alastair Clarkson	Luke Hodge	Jarryd Roughead	Josh Gibson	
2014	AFL	17	5	0	2nd	Won Qualifying final (Geelong) 104–68; Won Prelimary final (Port Adelaide) 97–94; Won Grand Final (Sydney) 137–74	Alastair Clarkson	Luke Hodge	Jarryd Roughead	Jordan Lewis	
2015	AFL	16	6	0	3rd	Lost Qualifying final (West Coast) 64–96; Won Semi-final (Adelaide) 135–61; Won Preliminary final (Fremantle) 94–67; Won Grand Final (West Coast) 107–61	Alastair Clarkson	Luke Hodge	Jack Gunston	Josh Gibson	
2016	AFL	17	5	0	3rd	Lost Qualifying final (Geelong) 83–85; Lost Semi-final (Western Bulldogs) 84–107	Alastair Clarkson	Luke Hodge	Jack Gunston	Sam Mitchell	
2017	AFL	10	11	1	12th		Alastair Clarkson	Jarryd Roughead	Jarryd Roughead	Tom Mitchell	
2018	AFL	15	7	0	4th	Lost Qualifying final (Richmond) 64–95; Lost Semi-final (Melbourne) 71–104	Alastair Clarkson	Jarryd Roughead	Luke Breust	Tom Mitchell	
2019	AFL	11	11	0	9th		Alastair Clarkson	Ben Stratton	Luke Breust	James Worpel	
2020	AFL	5	12	0	15th		Alastair Clarkson	Ben Stratton	Jack Gunston	Jack Gunston	
2021	AFL	7	13	2	14th		Alastair Clarkson	Ben McEvoy	Luke Breust	Tom Mitchell	
2022	AFL	8	14	0	13th		Sam Mitchell	Ben McEvoy	Luke Breust	James Sicily	
2023	AFL	7	16	0	16th		Sam Mitchell	James Sicily	Luke Breust	Will Day	
2024	AFL	14	9	0	7th	Won Elimination final (Western Bulldogs) 99–62; Lost Semi-final (Port Adelaide) 72–75	Sam Mitchell	James Sicily	Mabior Chol	Jai Newcombe	
2025	AFL	15	8	0	8th	Won Elimination final (Greater Western Sydney) 107–88; Won Semi-final (Adelaide) 101–67; Lost Preliminary final (Geelong) 85–115	Sam Mitchell	James Sicily	Jack Gunston	Jack Gunston	
2026	AFL	15	6	2	4th	Won Qualifying final (Fremantle) 72–40; Lost Preliminary final (Brisbane Lions) 122–131	Sam Mitchell	Jai Newcombe; James Sicily	Jack Gunston	Nick Watson	

== Women's ==
Note: Correct as of the end of the 2025 season.

Premiers	Runners–up	Minor premiers	Finals appearance	Wooden spoon	AFLW leading goalkicker	AFLW best and fairest

Year	League	W	L	D	Finish	Finals	Coach	Captain	Leading goalkicker	Best and fairest	Ref
2018	VFLW	12	2	0	1st	Won Semi-final (Collingwood) 32–21; Won Grand Final (Geelong) 30–19	Patrick Hill	Emma Mackie	Sarah Perkins	Jayde Van Dyk	
2019	VFLW	7	6	1	7th		Bec Goddard	Tamara Luke	Phoebe McWilliams	Rosie Dillon	
2020	VFLW	(No season)					Bec Goddard	Tamara Luke	(No season)		
2021	VFLW	5	9	0	9th		Bec Goddard	Meg Hutchins	Jessie Williams	Tamara Luke	
2022	VFLW	12	1	1	2nd	Lost Qualifying final (Essendon) 7–60; Lost Semi-final (Southern Saints) 39–55	Bec Goddard	Tamara Luke	Kristy Stratton; Jessie Williams	Jordan Mifsud	
2022 (S7)	AFLW	3	7	0	15th		Bec Goddard	Tilly Lucas-Rodd	Jess Duffin	Tilly Lucas-Rodd	
2023	AFLW	3	7	0	14th		Bec Goddard	Tilly Lucas-Rodd	Áine McDonagh	Emily Bates	
2024	AFLW	10	1	0	2nd	Lost Qualifying final (Brisbane) 32–38; Lost Semi-final (Port Adelaide) 49–50	Daniel Webster	Emily Bates	Áine McDonagh	Eliza West	
2025	AFLW	9	3	0	4th	Lost Qualifying final (North Melbourne) 3–42; Lost Semi-final (Carlton) 33–79	Daniel Webster	Emily Bates	Áine McDonagh	Áine McDonagh	
