= 1928 Hawthorn Football Club season =

4th season in the Victorian Football League

Hawthorn Football Club
1928 season
- President: J.W. Kennon
- Coach: Bert Sutton
- Captain: Bert Sutton
- Home ground: Glenferrie Oval
- VFL Season: 0–18 (12th)
- Finals Series: Did not qualify
- Best and Fairest: Miles Sellers
- Leading goalkicker: Bert Hyde (62)
- Highest home attendance: 15,000 (Round 1 vs. St Kilda)
- Lowest home attendance: 3,000 (Round 13 vs. North Melbourne)
- Average home attendance: 8,167

The 1928 season was the Hawthorn Football Club's 4th season in the Victorian Football League and 27th overall.

== Fixture ==
=== Premiership Season ===
Rd	Date and local time	Opponent	Scores (Hawthorn's scores indicated in bold)			Venue	Attendance	Record
Rd	Date and local time	Opponent	Home	Away	Result	Venue	Attendance	Record
1	Saturday, 21 April (2:45 pm)	St Kilda	**9.13 (67)**	10.10 (70)	Lost by 3 points	Glenferrie Oval (H)	15,000	0–1
2	Saturday, 28 April (2:45 pm)	North Melbourne	10.16 (76)	**8.13 (61)**	Lost by 15 points	Arden Street Oval (A)	6,000	0–2
3	Saturday, 5 May (2:45 pm)	Carlton	**7.17 (59)**	14.9 (93)	Lost by 34 points	Glenferrie Oval (H)	14,000	0–3
4	Saturday, 12 May (2:45 pm)	Collingwood	15.22 (112)	**5.9 (39)**	Lost by 73 points	Victoria Park (A)	8,000	0–4
5	Saturday, 19 May (2:45 pm)	Melbourne	**14.17 (101)**	16.14 (110)	Lost by 9 points	Glenferrie Oval (H)	8,000	0–5
6	Saturday, 26 May (2:45 pm)	Footscray	17.19 (121)	**7.3 (45)**	Lost by 76 points	Western Oval (A)	14,000	0–6
7	Saturday, 2 June (2:45 pm)	Essendon	**7.15 (57)**	13.20 (98)	Lost by 41 points	Glenferrie Oval (H)	6,000	0–7
8	Monday, 4 June (2:45 pm)	Geelong	15.21 (111)	**3.9 (27)**	Lost by 84 points	Corio Oval (A)	9,500	0–8
9	Saturday, 9 June (2:45 pm)	Fitzroy	**10.12 (72)**	15.16 (106)	Lost by 34 points	Glenferrie Oval (H)	8,000	0–9
10	Saturday, 23 June (2:45 pm)	Richmond	13.24 (102)	**11.10 (76)**	Lost by 26 points	Punt Road Oval (A)	16,000	0–10
11	Saturday, 30 June (2:45 pm)	South Melbourne	**14.11 (95)**	15.10 (100)	Lost by 5 points	Glenferrie Oval (H)	6,000	0–11
12	Saturday, 7 July (2:45 pm)	St Kilda	20.14 (134)	**12.13 (85)**	Lost by 49 points	Junction Oval (A)	19,000	0–12
13	Saturday, 14 July (2:45 pm)	North Melbourne	**8.17 (65)**	10.9 (69)	Lost by 4 points	Glenferrie Oval (H)	3,000	0–13
14	Saturday, 28 July (2:45 pm)	Carlton	22.17 (149)	**11.13 (79)**	Lost by 70 points	Princes Park (A)	10,000	0–14
15	Saturday, 4 August (2:45 pm)	Collingwood	**9.9 (63)**	17.18 (120)	Lost by 57 points	Glenferrie Oval (H)	5,000	0–15
16	Saturday, 11 August (2:45 pm)	Melbourne	12.16 (88)	**9.10 (64)**	Lost by 24 points	Melbourne Cricket Ground (A)	6,547	0–16
17	Saturday, 18 August (2:45 pm)	Footscray	**8.8 (56)**	19.9 (123)	Lost by 67 points	Glenferrie Oval (H)	8,500	0–17
18	Saturday, 1 September (2:45 pm)	Essendon	16.22 (118)	**9.6 (60)**	Lost by 58 points	Windy Hill (A)	10,000	0–18

== Ladder ==
(P)	Premiers
	Qualified for finals

#	Team	P	W	L	D	PF	PA	%	Pts
1	Collingwood (P)	18	15	3	0	1540	1144	134.6	60
2	Richmond	18	14	4	0	1640	1228	133.6	56
3	Melbourne	18	14	4	0	1507	1233	122.2	56
4	Carlton	18	11	7	0	1598	1316	121.4	44
5	Essendon	18	11	7	0	1441	1275	113.0	44
6	St Kilda	18	11	7	0	1499	1470	102.0	44
7	Footscray	18	9	9	0	1465	1340	109.3	36
8	Fitzroy	18	7	11	0	1480	1675	88.4	28
9	Geelong	18	6	12	0	1336	1343	99.5	24
10	South Melbourne	18	5	13	0	1461	1709	85.5	20
11	North Melbourne	18	5	13	0	1058	1563	67.7	20
12	Hawthorn	18	0	18	0	1171	1900	61.6	0

Rules for classification: 1. premiership points; 2. percentage; 3. points for
Average score: 79.6
Source: AFL Tables
