= 1927 Hawthorn Football Club season =

3rd season in the Victorian Football League

Hawthorn Football Club
1927 season
- President: J.W. Kennon
- Coach: Dan Minogue
- Captain: Clarrie Lethlean
- Home ground: Glenferrie Oval
- VFL Season: 1–17 (12th)
- Finals Series: Did not qualify
- Best and Fairest: Ern Utting
- Leading goalkicker: Bert Hyde (41)
- Highest home attendance: 10,000 (Round 6 vs. Melbourne, Round 9 vs. Richmond)
- Lowest home attendance: 5,000 (Round 12 vs. St Kilda, Round 14 vs. Footscray)
- Average home attendance: 7,556

The 1927 season was the Hawthorn Football Club's 3rd season in the Victorian Football League and 26th overall.

== Fixture ==
=== Premiership Season ===
Rd	Date and local time	Opponent	Scores (Hawthorn's scores indicated in bold)			Venue	Attendance	Record
Rd	Date and local time	Opponent	Home	Away	Result	Venue	Attendance	Record
1	Saturday, 30 April (2:45 pm)	St Kilda	12.16 (88)	**11.2 (68)**	Lost by 20 points	Junction Oval (A)	12,000	0–1
2	Saturday, 7 May (2:45 pm)	Collingwood	**7.9 (51)**	11.11 (77)	Lost by 26 points	Glenferrie Oval (H)	9,000	0–2
3	Saturday, 14 May (2:45 pm)	Footscray	10.18 (78)	**7.10 (52)**	Lost by 26 points	Western Oval (A)	11,000	0–3
4	Saturday, 21 May (2:45 pm)	North Melbourne	**8.8 (56)**	20.13 (133)	Lost by 77 points	Glenferrie Oval (H)	8,000	0–4
5	Saturday, 28 May (2:45 pm)	Carlton	14.12 (96)	**6.16 (52)**	Lost by 44 points	Princes Park (A)	10,000	0–5
6	Saturday, 4 June (2:45 pm)	Melbourne	**12.8 (80)**	17.10 (112)	Lost by 32 points	Glenferrie Oval (H)	10,000	0–6
7	Saturday, 11 June (2:45 pm)	Fitzroy	**11.11 (77)**	15.13 (103)	Lost by 26 points	Glenferrie Oval (H)	7,000	0–7
8	Saturday, 18 June (2:45 pm)	Geelong	22.23 (155)	**8.8 (56)**	Lost by 99 points	Corio Oval (A)	8,500	0–8
9	Saturday, 25 June (2:45 pm)	Richmond	**9.6 (60)**	9.20 (74)	Lost by 14 points	Glenferrie Oval (H)	10,000	0–9
10	Saturday, 2 July (2:45 pm)	South Melbourne	13.19 (97)	**5.11 (41)**	Lost by 56 points	Lake Oval (A)	5,000	0–10
11	Saturday, 9 July (2:45 pm)	Essendon	**9.17 (71)**	11.12 (78)	Lost by 7 points	Glenferrie Oval (H)	6,000	0–11
12	Saturday, 16 July (2:45 pm)	St Kilda	**7.12 (54)**	8.11 (59)	Lost by 5 points	Glenferrie Oval (H)	5,000	0–12
13	Saturday, 23 July (2:45 pm)	Collingwood	18.13 (121)	**6.11 (47)**	Lost by 74 points	Victoria Park (A)	7,000	0–13
14	Saturday, 30 July (2:45 pm)	Footscray	**8.19 (67)**	11.19 (85)	Lost by 18 points	Glenferrie Oval (H)	5,000	0–14
15	Saturday, 6 August (2:45 pm)	North Melbourne	11.10 (76)	**15.9 (99)**	Won by 23 points	Arden Street Oval (A)	4,000	1–14
16	Saturday, 27 August (2:45 pm)	Carlton	**10.10 (70)**	14.14 (98)	Lost by 28 points	Glenferrie Oval (H)	8,000	1–15
17	Saturday, 3 September (2:45 pm)	Melbourne	10.13 (73)	**3.15 (33)**	Lost by 40 points	Melbourne Cricket Ground (A)	5,268	1–16
18	Saturday, 10 September (2:45 pm)	Richmond	16.23 (119)	**6.17 (53)**	Lost by 66 points	Punt Road Oval (A)	11,000	1–17

== Ladder ==
(P)	Premiers
	Qualified for finals

#	Team	P	W	L	D	PF	PA	%	Pts
1	Collingwood (P)	18	15	3	0	1559	1035	150.6	60
2	Richmond	18	14	4	0	1483	1102	134.6	56
3	Geelong	18	14	4	0	1594	1208	132.0	56
4	Carlton	18	13	5	0	1434	1178	121.7	52
5	Melbourne	18	12	6	0	1548	1169	132.4	48
6	South Melbourne	18	9	9	0	1373	1431	95.9	36
7	St Kilda	18	8	10	0	1178	1564	75.3	32
8	Essendon	18	6	11	1	1198	1237	96.8	26
9	Fitzroy	18	6	11	1	1335	1558	85.7	26
10	Footscray	18	6	12	0	1131	1325	85.4	24
11	North Melbourne	18	3	15	0	1085	1476	73.5	12
12	Hawthorn	18	1	17	0	1087	1722	63.1	4

Rules for classification: 1. premiership points; 2. percentage; 3. points for
Average score: 74.1
Source: AFL Tables
