= 1936 Hawthorn Football Club season =

12th season in the Victorian Football League

Hawthorn Football Club
1936 season
- President: Dr. Jacob Jona
- Coach: Ivan McAlpine
- Captain: Ivan McAlpine
- Home ground: Glenferrie Oval
- VFL Season: 6–12 (9th)
- Finals Series: Did not qualify
- Best and Fairest: Leo Murphy
- Leading goalkicker: Norm Hillard (26)
- Highest home attendance: 18,000 (Round 3 vs. Carlton
- Lowest home attendance: 6,000 (Round 6 vs. Geelong, Round 11 vs. North Melbourne)
- Average home attendance: 10,333

The 1936 season was the Hawthorn Football Club's 12th season in the Victorian Football League and 35th overall.

== Fixture ==
=== Premiership Season ===
Rd	Date and local time	Opponent	Scores (Hawthorn's scores indicated in bold)			Venue	Attendance	Record
Rd	Date and local time	Opponent	Home	Away	Result	Venue	Attendance	Record
1	Saturday, 2 May (2:45 pm)	Collingwood	**12.11 (83)**	15.14 (104)	Lost by 21 points	Glenferrie Oval (H)	14,000	0–1
2	Saturday, 9 May (2:45 pm)	Footscray	8.20 (68)	**11.7 (73)**	Won by 5 points	Western Oval (A)	10,000	1–1
3	Saturday, 16 May (2:45 pm)	Carlton	**14.13 (97)**	16.11 (107)	Lost by 10 points	Glenferrie Oval (H)	18,000	1–2
4	Saturday, 23 May (2:45 pm)	Melbourne	16.20 (116)	**11.11 (77)**	Lost by 39 points	Melbourne Cricket Ground (A)	10,152	1–3
5	Saturday, 30 May (2:45 pm)	Richmond	16.21 (117)	**10.12 (72)**	Lost by 45 points	Punt Road Oval (A)	9,000	1–4
6	Saturday, 6 June (2:45 pm)	South Melbourne	**9.11 (65)**	18.20 (128)	Lost by 63 points	Glenferrie Oval (H)	12,000	1–5
7	Saturday, 13 June (2:45 pm)	Geelong	**12.19 (91)**	7.6 (48)	Won by 43 points	Glenferrie Oval (H)	6,000	2–5
8	Saturday, 20 June (2:45 pm)	Essendon	12.19 (91)	**8.18 (66)**	Lost by 25 points	Windy Hill (A)	11,000	2–6
9	Saturday, 27 June (2:45 pm)	Fitzroy	**11.9 (75)**	9.9 (63)	Won by 12 points	Glenferrie Oval (H)	8,000	3–6
10	Saturday, 11 July (2:45 pm)	St Kilda	16.9 (105)	**12.16 (88)**	Lost by 17 points	Junction Oval (A)	9,000	3–7
11	Saturday, 18 July (2:45 pm)	North Melbourne	**8.19 (67)**	7.11 (53)	Won by 14 points	Glenferrie Oval (H)	6,000	4–7
12	Saturday, 25 July (2:45 pm)	Collingwood	14.18 (102)	**6.12 (48)**	Lost by 54 points	Victoria Park (A)	7,000	4–8
13	Saturday, 1 August (2:45 pm)	Footscray	**13.13 (91)**	8.21 (69)	Won by 22 points	Glenferrie Oval (H)	10,000	5–8
14	Saturday, 8 August (2:45 pm)	Carlton	11.17 (83)	**8.16 (64)**	Lost by 19 points	Princes Park (A)	9,000	5–9
15	Saturday, 15 August (2:45 pm)	Melbourne	**9.8 (62)**	17.10 (112)	Lost by 50 points	Glenferrie Oval (H)	10,000	5–10
16	Saturday, 22 August (2:45 pm)	Richmond	**15.12 (102)**	14.16 (100)	Won by 2 points	Glenferrie Oval (H)	9,000	6–10
17	Saturday, 29 August (2:45 pm)	South Melbourne	16.10 (106)	**15.11 (101)**	Lost by 5 points	Lake Oval (A)	12,000	6–11
18	Saturday, 5 September (2:45 pm)	Geelong	21.22 (148)	**9.15 (69)**	Lost by 79 points	Corio Oval (A)	6,000	6–12

== Ladder ==
(P)	Premiers
	Qualified for finals

#	Team	P	W	L	D	PF	PA	%	Pts
1	South Melbourne	18	16	2	0	1806	1524	118.5	64
2	Collingwood (P)	18	15	3	0	1854	1367	135.6	60
3	Carlton	18	12	6	0	1877	1504	124.8	48
4	Melbourne	18	12	6	0	1755	1477	118.8	48
5	Geelong	18	11	7	0	1884	1498	125.8	44
6	Richmond	18	10	8	0	1673	1550	107.9	40
7	St Kilda	18	9	9	0	1845	1919	96.1	36
8	Essendon	18	6	12	0	1565	1840	85.1	24
9	Hawthorn	18	6	12	0	1391	1720	80.9	24
10	Footscray	18	5	13	0	1462	1690	86.5	20
11	North Melbourne	18	4	14	0	1274	1679	75.9	16
12	Fitzroy	18	2	16	0	1367	1985	68.9	8

Rules for classification: 1. premiership points; 2. percentage; 3. points for
Average score: 91.4
Source: AFL Tables
