= 1996 Hawthorn Football Club season =

72nd season in the Australian Football League

Hawthorn Football Club
1996 season
- President: Brian Coleman
- Coach: Ken Judge
- Captain: Jason Dunstall
- Home ground: Waverley Park
- AFL season: 11–10–1 (8th)
- Finals series: Qualifying Final (lost to Sydney 84–90)
- Best and Fairest: Paul Salmon
- Leading goalkicker: Jason Dunstall (101)
- Highest home attendance: 38,263 (Round 2 vs. Richmond)
- Lowest home attendance: 14,286 (Round 9 vs. West Coast)
- Average home attendance: 23,624

The 1996 season was the Hawthorn Football Club's 72nd season in the Australian Football League and 95th overall.

== Fixture ==
=== Premiership season ===
| Rd | Date and local time | Opponent | Scores (Hawthorn's scores indicated in bold) | | | Venue | Attendance | Record |
| Rd | Date and local time | Opponent | Home | Away | Result | Venue | Attendance | Record |
|---|---|---|---|---|---|---|---|---|
| 1 | Saturday, 30 March (2:10 pm) | Fitzroy | 11.5 (71) | **13.14 (92)** | Won by 21 points | Whitten Oval (A) | 10,239 | 1–0 |
| 2 | Saturday, 6 April (2:10 pm) | Richmond | **6.15 (51)** | 14.14 (98) | Lost by 47 points | Waverley Park (H) | 38,263 | 1–1 |
| 3 | Saturday, 13 April (2:10 pm) | North Melbourne | **12.8 (80)** | 22.21 (153) | Lost by 73 points | Waverley Park (H) | 20,331 | 1–2 |
| 4 | Saturday, 20 April (2:10 pm) | Footscray | 8.9 (57) | **8.9 (57)** | Draw | Whitten Oval (A) | 16,804 | 1–2–1 |
| 5 | Saturday, 27 April (7:40 pm) | Sydney | 13.10 (88) | **11.10 (76)** | Lost by 12 points | Sydney Cricket Ground (A) | 20,227 | 1–3–1 |
| 6 | Saturday, 4 May (7:40 pm) | St Kilda | **9.11 (65)** | 13.8 (86) | Lost by 21 points | Waverley Park (H) | 30,225 | 1–4–1 |
| 7 | Saturday, 11 May (7:40 pm) | Brisbane Bears | 15.14 (104) | **5.11 (41)** | Lost by 63 points | The Gabba (A) | 20,053 | 1–5–1 |
| 8 | Saturday, 18 May (2:10 pm) | Melbourne | **19.8 (122)** | 10.11 (71) | Won by 51 points | Waverley Park (H) | 20,527 | 2–5–1 |
| 9 | Saturday, 25 May (2:10 pm) | West Coast | **8.8 (56)** | 14.6 (90) | Lost by 34 points | Waverley Park (H) | 14,286 | 2–6–1 |
| 10 | Sunday, 9 June (2:10 pm) | Fremantle | 7.11 (53) | **17.8 (110)** | Won by 57 points | Subiaco Oval (A) | 19,350 | 3–6–1 |
| 11 | Saturday, 15 June (2:10 pm) | Adelaide | **16.12 (108)** | 14.15 (99) | Won by 9 points | Waverley Park (H) | 16,652 | 4–6–1 |
| 12 | Saturday, 22 June (2:10 pm) | Fitzroy | **17.12 (114)** | 12.11 (83) | Won by 31 points | Waverley Park (H) | 16,217 | 5–6–1 |
| 13 | Saturday, 29 June (2:10 pm) | Essendon | 18.13 (121) | **15.10 (100)** | Lost by 21 points | Melbourne Cricket Ground (A) | 43,481 | 5–7–1 |
| 14 | Saturday, 6 July (2:10 pm) | Collingwood | **17.12 (114)** | 11.15 (81) | Won by 33 points | Waverley Park (H) | 30,886 | 6–7–1 |
| 15 | Saturday, 13 July (2:10 pm) | Geelong | 10.12 (72) | **11.8 (74)** | Won by 2 points | Kardinia Park (A) | 22,207 | 7–7–1 |
| 16 | Saturday, 20 July (7:40 pm) | Carlton | **15.8 (98)** | 7.7 (49) | Won by 49 points | Waverley Park (H) | 28,670 | 8–7–1 |
| 17 | Saturday, 27 July (2:10 pm) | Richmond | 17.12 (114) | **11.7 (73)** | Lost by 41 points | Optus Oval (A) | 19,081 | 8–8–1 |
| 18 | Friday, 2 August (8:10 pm) | North Melbourne | 19.16 (130) | **15.9 (99)** | Lost by 31 points | Melbourne Cricket Ground (A) | 28,555 | 8–9–1 |
| 19 | Saturday, 10 August (7:40 pm) | Footscray | **20.12 (132)** | 10.5 (65) | Won by 67 points | Waverley Park (H) | 14,914 | 9–9–1 |
| 20 | Saturday, 17 August (2:10 pm) | Sydney | **7.7 (49)** | 9.18 (62) | Lost by 23 points | Waverley Park (H) | 28,897 | 9–10–1 |
| 21 | Saturday, 24 August (2:10 pm) | St Kilda | 9.9 (63) | **12.8 (80)** | Won by 17 points | Waverley Park (A) | 28,118 | 10–10–1 |
| 22 | Saturday, 31 August (7:40 pm) | Melbourne | 15.11 (101) | **15.12 (102)** | Won by 1 point | Melbourne Cricket Ground (A) | 63,196 | 11–10–1 |

=== Finals series ===
| Rd | Date and local time | Opponent | Scores (Hawthorn's scores indicated in bold) | | | Venue | Attendance |
| Rd | Date and local time | Opponent | Home | Away | Result | Venue | Attendance |
|---|---|---|---|---|---|---|---|
| Qualifying final | Saturday, 7 September (7:45 pm) | Sydney | 13.12 (90) | **12.12 (84)** | Lost by 6 points | Sydney Cricket Ground (A) | 37,010 |

== Ladder ==
| (P) | Premiers |
| | Qualified for finals |

| # | Team | P | W | L | D | PF | PA | % | Pts |
|---|---|---|---|---|---|---|---|---|---|
| 1 | Sydney | 22 | 16 | 5 | 1 | 2152 | 1737 | 123.9 | 66 |
| 2 | North Melbourne (P) | 22 | 16 | 6 | 0 | 2526 | 1982 | 127.4 | 64 |
| 3 | Brisbane Bears | 22 | 15 | 6 | 1 | 2174 | 1731 | 125.6 | 62 |
| 4 | West Coast | 22 | 15 | 7 | 0 | 2201 | 1758 | 125.2 | 60 |
| 5 | Carlton | 22 | 15 | 7 | 0 | 2116 | 1909 | 110.8 | 60 |
| 6 | Essendon | 22 | 14 | 7 | 1 | 2209 | 2023 | 109.2 | 58 |
| 7 | Geelong | 22 | 13 | 8 | 1 | 2353 | 2047 | 114.9 | 54 |
| 8 | Hawthorn | 22 | 11 | 10 | 1 | 1893 | 1921 | 98.5 | 46 |
| 9 | Richmond | 22 | 11 | 11 | 0 | 2282 | 1944 | 117.4 | 44 |
| 10 | St Kilda | 22 | 10 | 12 | 0 | 2053 | 2033 | 101.0 | 40 |
| 11 | Collingwood | 22 | 9 | 13 | 0 | 2203 | 2142 | 102.8 | 36 |
| 12 | Adelaide | 22 | 8 | 14 | 0 | 2233 | 2327 | 96.0 | 32 |
| 13 | Fremantle | 22 | 7 | 15 | 0 | 1830 | 1983 | 92.3 | 28 |
| 14 | Melbourne | 22 | 7 | 15 | 0 | 1743 | 2463 | 70.8 | 28 |
| 15 | Footscray | 22 | 5 | 16 | 1 | 1654 | 2139 | 77.3 | 22 |
| 16 | Fitzroy | 22 | 1 | 21 | 0 | 1452 | 2935 | 49.5 | 4 |

Rules for classification: 1. premiership points; 2. percentage; 3. points for
Average score: 94.0
Source: AFL Tables
