= 1995 Hawthorn Football Club season =

71st season in the Australian Football League

Hawthorn Football Club
1995 season
- President: Geoff Lloyd
- Coach: Peter Knights
- Captain: Jason Dunstall
- Home ground: Waverley Park
- AFL season: 7–15 (15th)
- Finals series: Did not qualify
- Best and Fairest: Darren Jarman
- Leading goalkicker: Jason Dunstall (66)
- Highest home attendance: 40,715 (Round 5 vs. Collingwood)
- Lowest home attendance: 14,167 (Round 15 vs. Fremantle)
- Average home attendance: 22,735

The 1995 season was the Hawthorn Football Club's 71st season in the Australian Football League and 94th overall.

== Fixture ==
=== Premiership season ===
Rd	Date and local time	Opponent	Scores (Hawthorn's scores indicated in bold)			Venue	Attendance	Record
Rd	Date and local time	Opponent	Home	Away	Result	Venue	Attendance	Record
1	Saturday, 1 April (2:10 pm)	Brisbane Bears	**20.7 (127)**	11.4 (70)	Won by 57 points	Waverley Park (H)	14,653	1–0
2	Saturday, 8 April (2:10 pm)	Footscray	**10.11 (71)**	14.11 (95)	Lost by 24 points	Waverley Park (H)	18,136	1–1
3	Sunday, 2:10 pm)	Richmond	**5.4 (34)**	4.16 (40)	Lost by 6 points	Waverley Park (H)	24,820	1–2
4	Saturday, 22 April (2:10 pm)	St Kilda	10.10 (70)	**16.10 (106)**	Won by 36 points	Waverley Park (A)	24,972	2–2
5	Sunday, 30 April (2:10 pm)	Collingwood	**14.12 (96)**	4.13 (37)	Won by 59 points	Waverley Park (H)	40,715	3–2
6	Sunday, 7 May (2:10 pm)	North Melbourne	22.12 (144)	**14.13 (97)**	Lost by 47 points	Melbourne Cricket Ground (A)	32,207	3–3
7	Saturday, 13 May (2:10 pm)	Geelong	9.19 (73)	**11.12 (78)**	Won by 5 points	Kardinia Park (A)	24,842	4–3
8	Saturday, 20 May (2:10 pm)	Melbourne	**7.8 (50)**	17.10 (112)	Lost by 62 points	Waverley Park (H)	24,372	4–4
9	Saturday, 27 May (8:40 pm)	Adelaide	9.6 (60)	**7.16 (58)**	Lost by 2 points	Football Park (A)	38,740	4–5
10	Sunday, 4 June (2:10 pm)	Carlton	26.16 (172)	**10.10 (70)**	Lost by 102 points	Optus Oval (A)	29,520	4–6
11	Monday, 12 June (2:10 pm)	Sydney	**17.11 (113)**	9.17 (71)	Won by 42 points	Waverley Park (H)	19,737	5–6
12	Friday, 23 June (8:10 pm)	Essendon	10.18 (78)	**8.12 (60)**	Lost by 18 points	Melbourne Cricket Ground (A)	47,237	5–7
13	Sunday, 2 July (2:10 pm)	Fitzroy	7.10 (52)	**21.25 (151)**	Won by 99 points	Optus Oval (A)	12,503	6–7
14	Saturday, 8 July (2:10 pm)	West Coast	**8.8 (56)**	14.13 (97)	Lost by 41 points	Waverley Park (H)	19,373	6–8
15	Saturday, 15 July (2:10 pm)	Fremantle	**18.10 (118)**	11.8 (74)	Won by 44 points	Waverley Park (H)	14,167	7–8
16	Sunday, 23 July (1:15 pm)	Brisbane Bears	14.20 (104)	**14.13 (97)**	Lost by 7 points	The Gabba (A)	8,209	7–9
17	Saturday, 29 July (2:10 pm)	Footscray	8.9 (57)	**7.10 (52)**	Lost by 5 points	Whitten Oval (A)	16,673	7–10
18	Friday, 4 August (8:10 pm)	Richmond	13.21 (99)	**8.7 (55)**	Lost by 44 points	Melbourne Cricket Ground (A)	37,543	7–11
19	Saturday, 12 August (2:10 pm)	St Kilda	**14.13 (97)**	16.9 (105)	Lost by 8 points	Waverley Park (H)	19,852	7–12
20	Friday, 18 August (8:10 pm)	Collingwood	15.14 (104)	**15.11 (101)**	Lost by 3 points	Melbourne Cricket Ground (A)	51,746	7–13
21	Saturday, 26 August (2:10 pm)	North Melbourne	**9.14 (68)**	17.11 (113)	Lost by 45 points	Waverley Park (H)	21,513	7–14
22	Saturday, 2 September (2:10 pm)	Geelong	**15.12 (102)**	23.10 (148)	Lost by 46 points	Waverley Park (H)	32,747	7–15

== Ladder ==
(P)	Premiers
	Qualified for finals

#	Team	P	W	L	D	PF	PA	%	Pts
1	Carlton (P)	22	20	2	0	2357	1711	137.8	80
2	Geelong	22	16	6	0	2558	1939	131.9	64
3	Richmond	22	15	6	1	2096	1943	107.9	62
4	Essendon	22	14	6	2	2464	1931	127.6	60
5	West Coast	22	14	8	0	2079	1692	122.9	56
6	North Melbourne	22	14	8	0	2311	2013	114.8	56
7	Footscray	22	11	10	1	1879	2054	91.5	46
8	Brisbane Bears	22	10	12	0	2104	2207	95.3	40
9	Melbourne	22	9	13	0	1938	1925	100.7	36
10	Collingwood	22	8	12	2	2043	2111	96.8	36
11	Adelaide	22	9	13	0	1749	2184	80.1	36
12	Sydney	22	8	14	0	2314	2299	100.7	32
13	Fremantle	22	8	14	0	2051	2209	92.8	32
14	St Kilda	22	8	14	0	1814	2258	80.3	32
15	Hawthorn	22	7	15	0	1857	1975	94.0	28
16	Fitzroy	22	2	20	0	1617	2780	58.2	8

Rules for classification: 1. premiership points; 2. percentage; 3. points for
Average score: 94.4
Source: AFL Tables
