= 1934 Hawthorn Football Club season =

10th season in the Victorian Football League

Hawthorn Football Club
1934 season
- President: Dr. Jacob Jona
- Coach: Bill Twomey, Sr.
- Captain: Bert Mills
- Home ground: Glenferrie Oval
- VFL Season: 3–15 (11th)
- Finals Series: Did not qualify
- Best and Fairest: Ernie Loveless
- Leading goalkicker: Jack Green (80)
- Highest home attendance: 17,000 (Round 1 vs. Carlton
- Lowest home attendance: 4,000 (Round 18 vs. Richmond)
- Average home attendance: 8,000

The 1934 season was the Hawthorn Football Club's 10th season in the Victorian Football League and 33rd overall.

== Fixture ==
=== Premiership Season ===
Rd	Date and local time	Opponent	Scores (Hawthorn's scores indicated in bold)			Venue	Attendance	Record
Rd	Date and local time	Opponent	Home	Away	Result	Venue	Attendance	Record
1	Saturday, 5 May (2:45 pm)	Carlton	**12.8 (80)**	17.26 (128)	Lost by 48 points	Glenferrie Oval (H)	17,000	0–1
2	Saturday, 12 May (2:45 pm)	Melbourne	20.13 (133)	**6.8 (44)**	Lost by 89 points	Melbourne Cricket Ground (A)	9,842	0–2
3	Saturday, 19 May (2:45 pm)	Collingwood	**9.8 (62)**	19.15 (129)	Lost by 67 points	Glenferrie Oval (H)	8,000	0–3
4	Saturday, 26 May (2:45 pm)	Essendon	15.13 (103)	**13.11 (89)**	Lost by 14 points	Windy Hill (A)	10,000	0–4
5	Saturday, 2 June (2:45 pm)	South Melbourne	**13.14 (92)**	22.12 (144)	Lost by 52 points	Glenferrie Oval (H)	12,000	0–5
6	Saturday, 9 June (2:45 pm)	Footscray	**11.11 (77)**	10.11 (71)	Won by 6 points	Glenferrie Oval (H)	8,000	1–5
7	Saturday, 23 June (2:45 pm)	Richmond	16.14 (110)	**11.15 (81)**	Lost by 29 points	Punt Road Oval (A)	10,000	1–6
8	Saturday, 30 June (2:45 pm)	Geelong	**11.12 (78)**	17.17 (119)	Lost by 41 points	Glenferrie Oval (H)	6,000	1–7
9	Saturday, 7 July (2:45 pm)	Fitzroy	13.21 (99)	**11.13 (79)**	Lost by 20 points	Brunswick Street Oval (A)	9,000	1–8
10	Saturday, 14 July (2:45 pm)	North Melbourne	**6.17 (53)**	6.12 (48)	Won by 5 points	Glenferrie Oval (H)	6,000	2–8
11	Saturday, 21 July (2:45 pm)	St Kilda	13.10 (88)	**10.12 (72)**	Lost by 16 points	Junction Oval (A)	10,000	2–9
12	Saturday, 28 July (2:45 pm)	Carlton	22.13 (145)	**10.6 (66)**	Lost by 79 points	Princes Park (A)	12,000	2–10
13	Saturday, 4 August (2:45 pm)	Melbourne	**11.7 (73)**	10.16 (76)	Lost by 3 points	Glenferrie Oval (H)	6,000	2–11
14	Saturday, 18 August (2:45 pm)	Collingwood	23.22 (160)	**10.13 (73)**	Lost by 87 points	Victoria Park (A)	5,000	2–12
15	Saturday, 25 August (2:45 pm)	Essendon	**11.15 (81)**	11.13 (79)	Won by 2 points	Glenferrie Oval (H)	5,000	3–12
16	Saturday, 1 September (2:45 pm)	South Melbourne	15.11 (101)	**10.10 (70)**	Lost by 31 points	Lake Oval (A)	13,000	3–13
17	Saturday, 8 September (2:45 pm)	Footscray	14.18 (102)	**12.7 (79)**	Lost by 23 points	Western Oval (A)	5,000	3–14
18	Saturday, 15 September (2:45 pm)	Richmond	**7.9 (51)**	11.16 (82)	Lost by 31 points	Glenferrie Oval (H)	4,000	3–15

== Ladder ==
(P)	Premiers
	Qualified for finals

#	Team	P	W	L	D	PF	PA	%	Pts
1	Richmond (P)	18	15	3	0	1618	1334	121.3	60
2	Geelong	18	14	3	1	1834	1355	135.4	58
3	South Melbourne	18	14	4	0	2187	1560	140.2	56
4	Collingwood	18	13	4	1	1915	1571	121.9	54
5	Carlton	18	12	6	0	1986	1707	116.3	48
6	Melbourne	18	9	9	0	1623	1670	97.2	36
7	St Kilda	18	9	9	0	1592	1661	95.8	36
8	Fitzroy	18	7	11	0	1589	1660	95.7	28
9	Footscray	18	6	12	0	1444	1699	85.0	24
10	Essendon	18	5	13	0	1635	1958	83.5	20
11	Hawthorn	18	3	15	0	1300	1917	67.8	12
12	North Melbourne	18	0	18	0	1245	1876	66.4	0

Rules for classification: 1. premiership points; 2. percentage; 3. points for
Average score: 92.4
Source: AFL Tables
