= Len Gibb =

Australian rules footballer (1888–1967)

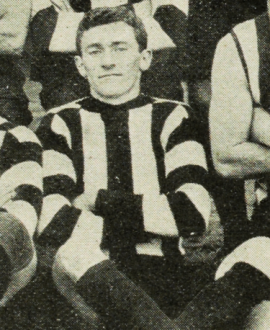
- Gibb in 1912

Personal information
- Full name: Leonard Wallace Gibb
- Born: 8 October 1888; Hawthorn, Victoria
- Died: 10 September 1967 (aged 78); Melbourne, Victoria
- Original team: Hawthorn (VMFL)
- Height: 178 cm (5 ft 10 in)
- Weight: 71 kg (157 lb)

Playing career^{1}
Years	Club	Games (Goals)
1912	Collingwood	9 (1)
1914	Richmond	1 (0)
1914–21	Hawthorn (VFA)	36 (25)
1923	Williamstown (VFA)	8 (3)
- ^{1} Playing statistics correct to the end of 1923.

Leonard Wallace Gibb (8 October 1888 – 10 September 1967) was an Australian rules footballer who played with Collingwood and Richmond in the Victorian Football League (VFL).

== Career ==
Gibb started out as a Hawthorn player when that club was still a member of the Amateur competition. He played nine games with Collingwood before transferring to Richmond where he had the solitary game. After World War I, Gibb was appointed captain of Hawthorn (by this time in the VFA), and proceeded to be the club leading goalkicker for the 1919 season.
