= 1999 Hawthorn Football Club season =

75th season in the Australian Football League

Hawthorn Football Club
1999 season
- President: Ian Dicker
- Coach: Ken Judge
- Captain: Shane Crawford
- Home ground: Waverley Park
- AFL season: 10–11–1 (9th)
- Finals series: Did not qualify
- Best and Fairest: Shane Crawford
- Leading goalkicker: Aaron Lord (42)
- Highest home attendance: 72,130 (Round 22 vs. Sydney)
- Lowest home attendance: 13,941 (Round 18 vs. Fremantle)
- Average home attendance: 34,863

The 1999 season was the Hawthorn Football Club's 75th season in the Australian Football League and 98th overall.

== Fixture ==
=== Premiership season ===
Rd	Date and local time	Opponent	Scores (Hawthorn's scores indicated in bold)			Venue	Attendance	Record
Rd	Date and local time	Opponent	Home	Away	Result	Venue	Attendance	Record
1	Sunday, 28 March (2:10 pm)	Collingwood	8.11 (59)	**10.14 (74)**	Won by 15 points	Melbourne Cricket Ground (A)	48,620	1–0
2	Saturday, 3 April (2:10 pm)	Adelaide	**8.8 (56)**	8.12 (60)	Lost by 4 points	Waverley Park (H)	29,135	1–1
3	Saturday, 10 April (8:40 pm)	Fremantle	11.12 (78)	**16.16 (112)**	Won by 34 points	Subiaco Oval (A)	22,552	2–1
4	Friday, 16 April (7:40 pm)	Melbourne	12.13 (85)	**12.12 (84)**	Lost by 1 point	Melbourne Cricket Ground (A)	46,289	2–2
5	Saturday, 24 April (2:10 pm)	West Coast	**9.14 (68)**	14.10 (94)	Lost by 26 points	Waverley Park (H)	27,370	2–3
6	Saturday, 1 May (2:10 pm)	Geelong	14.14 (98)	**14.16 (100)**	Won by 2 points	Shell Stadium (A)	27,341	3–3
7	Sunday, 9 May (2:40 pm)	Sydney	20.11 (131)	**16.7 (103)**	Lost by 28 points	Sydney Cricket Ground (A)	25,823	3–4
8	Saturday, 15 May (2:10 pm)	Kangaroos	**7.7 (49)**	15.11 (101)	Lost by 52 points	Waverley Park (H)	21,114	3–5
9	Saturday, 22 May (2:10 pm)	Essendon	**7.5 (47)**	15.17 (107)	Lost by 60 points	Waverley Park (A)	46,479	3–6
10	Saturday, 5 June (2:10 pm)	Richmond	11.15 (81)	**12.15 (87)**	Won by 6 points	Melbourne Cricket Ground (A)	45,382	4–6
11	Sunday, 13 June (2:10 pm)	Western Bulldogs	10.16 (76)	**11.10 (76)**	Draw	Optus Oval (A)	18,977	4–6–1
12	Saturday, 19 June (2:10 pm)	St Kilda	**17.7 (109)**	14.12 (96)	Won by 13 points	Waverley Park (H)	36,381	5–6–1
13	Saturday, 26 June (7:40 pm)	Port Adelaide	8.17 (65)	**6.9 (45)**	Lost by 20 points	Football Park (A)	28,739	5–7–1
14	Sunday, 4 July (2:10 pm)	Carlton	**7.13 (55)**	13.11 (89)	Lost by 34 points	Waverley Park (H)	48,353	5–8–1
15	Saturday, 10 July (7:40 pm)	Brisbane Lions	13.14 (92)	**9.7 (61)**	Lost by 31 points	The Gabba (A)	22,758	5–9–1
16	Sunday, 18 July (2:10 pm)	Collingwood	**14.8 (92)**	18.16 (124)	Lost by 32 points	Waverley Park (H)	40,319	5–10–1
17	Sunday, 25 July (2:10 pm)	Adelaide	18.17 (125)	**11.10 (76)**	Lost by 49 points	Football Park (A)	38,679	5–11–1
18	Sunday, 1 August (2:10 pm)	Fremantle	**15.12 (102)**	9.23 (77)	Won by 25 points	Waverley Park (H)	13,941	6–11–1
19	Sunday, 8 August (2:10 pm)	Melbourne	**18.14 (122)**	8.6 (54)	Won by 68 points	Waverley Park (H)	16,665	7–11–1
20	Saturday, 14 August (8:10 pm)	West Coast	11.16 (82)	**12.12 (84)**	Won by 2 points	WACA (A)	24,835	8–11–1
21	Saturday, 21 August (7:40 pm)	Geelong	**15.13 (103)**	15.11 (101)	Won by 2 points	Waverley Park (H)	31,603	9–11–1
22	Sunday, 29 August (2:10 pm)	Sydney	**23.15 (153)**	11.2 (68)	Won by 85 points	Waverley Park (H)	72,130	10–11–1

== Ladder ==
(P)	Premiers
	Qualified for finals

#	Team	P	W	L	D	PF	PA	%	Pts
1	Essendon	22	18	4	0	2400	1905	126.0	72
2	Kangaroos (P)	22	17	5	0	2463	2129	115.7	68
3	Brisbane Lions	22	16	6	0	2422	1671	144.9	64
4	Western Bulldogs	22	15	6	1	2363	1993	118.6	62
5	West Coast	22	12	10	0	2068	1937	106.8	48
6	Carlton	22	12	10	0	2088	2028	103.0	48
7	Port Adelaide	22	12	10	0	1851	2054	90.1	48
8	Sydney	22	11	11	0	2184	2128	102.6	44
9	Hawthorn	22	10	11	1	1858	1943	95.6	42
10	St Kilda	22	10	12	0	1978	2021	97.9	40
11	Geelong	22	10	12	0	2328	2454	94.9	40
12	Richmond	22	9	13	0	1977	2170	91.1	36
13	Adelaide	22	8	14	0	1903	2232	85.3	32
14	Melbourne	22	6	16	0	1850	2293	80.7	24
15	Fremantle	22	5	17	0	1981	2403	82.4	20
16	Collingwood	22	4	18	0	1973	2326	84.8	16

Rules for classification: 1. premiership points; 2. percentage; 3. points for
Average score: 95.7
Source: AFL Tables
