= 1968 Hawthorn Football Club season =

44th season in the Victorian Football League

Hawthorn Football Club
1968 season
- President: Phil J. Ryan
- Coach: John Kennedy, Sr.
- Captain: Graham Arthur
- Home ground: Glenferrie Oval
- VFL season: 9–10–1 (6th)
- Finals series: Did not qualify
- Best and Fairest: Peter Hudson
- Leading goalkicker: Peter Hudson (125)
- Highest home attendance: 25,928 (Round 16 vs. Collingwood)
- Lowest home attendance: 10,468 (Round 6 vs. Geelong)
- Average home attendance: 16,153

The 1968 season was the Hawthorn Football Club's 44th season in the Victorian Football League and the 67th overall.

== Fixture ==
=== Premiership season ===
Rd	Date and local time	Opponent	Scores (Hawthorn's scores indicated in bold)			Venue	Attendance	Record
Rd	Date and local time	Opponent	Home	Away	Result	Venue	Attendance	Record
1	Monday, 15 April (2:20 pm)	Essendon	26.16 (172)	**15.9 (99)**	Lost by 73 points	Windy Hill (A)	16,940	0–1
2	Saturday, 20 April (2:20 pm)	South Melbourne	**17.24 (126)**	19.12 (126)	Draw	Glenferrie Oval (H)	13,847	0–1–1
3	Saturday, 27 April (2:20 pm)	Footscray	14.10 (94)	**16.9 (105)**	Won by 11 points	Western Oval (A)	14,054	1–1–1
4	Saturday, 4 May (2:20 pm)	Carlton	**11.11 (77)**	15.10 (100)	Lost by 23 points	Glenferrie Oval (H)	17,128	1–2–1
5	Saturday, 11 May (2:20 pm)	Collingwood	17.11 (113)	**11.16 (82)**	Lost by 31 points	Victoria Park (A)	20,688	1–3–1
6	Saturday, 18 May (2:20 pm)	Geelong	**10.11 (71)**	12.10 (82)	Lost by 11 points	Glenferrie Oval (H)	10,468	1–4–1
7	Saturday, 25 May (2:20 pm)	Melbourne	11.14 (80)	**11.10 (76)**	Lost by 4 points	Melbourne Cricket Ground (A)	17,263	1–5–1
8	Monday, 10 June (2:20 pm)	Richmond	11.15 (81)	**11.14 (80)**	Lost by 1 point	Melbourne Cricket Ground (A)	31,325	1–6–1
9	Saturday, 15 June (2:20 pm)	Fitzroy	**21.14 (140)**	16.14 (110)	Won by 30 points	Glenferrie Oval (H)	11,039	2–6–1
10	Saturday, 22 June (2:20 pm)	North Melbourne	8.14 (62)	**15.16 (106)**	Won by 44 points	Arden Street Oval (A)	7,884	3–6–1
11	Saturday, 29 June (2:20 pm)	St Kilda	**15.11 (101)**	17.9 (111)	Lost by 10 points	Glenferrie Oval (H)	19,269	3–7–1
12	Saturday, 6 July (2:20 pm)	Essendon	**11.17 (83)**	17.10 (112)	Lost by 29 points	Glenferrie Oval (H)	13,909	3–8–1
13	Saturday, 13 July (2:20 pm)	South Melbourne	12.10 (82)	**15.11 (101)**	Won by 19 points	Lake Oval (A)	11,181	4–8–1
14	Saturday, 20 July (2:20 pm)	Footscray	**24.8 (152)**	10.10 (70)	Won by 82 points	Glenferrie Oval (H)	13,810	5–8–1
15	Saturday, 27 July (2:20 pm)	Carlton	9.14 (68)	**11.15 (81)**	Won by 13 points	Princes Park (A)	18,842	6–8–1
16	Saturday, 3 August (2:20 pm)	Collingwood	**15.11 (101)**	10.16 (76)	Won by 25 points	Glenferrie Oval (H)	25,928	7–8–1
17	Saturday, 10 August (2:20 pm)	Geelong	10.7 (67)	**7.9 (51)**	Lost by 16 points	Kardinia Park (A)	20,822	7–9–1
18	Saturday, 17 August (2:20 pm)	Melbourne	**14.13 (97)**	8.11 (59)	Won by 38 points	Glenferrie Oval (H)	14,359	8–9–1
19	Saturday, 24 August (2:20 pm)	Richmond	**11.13 (79)**	11.22 (88)	Lost by 9 points	Glenferrie Oval (H)	21,772	8–10–1
20	Saturday, 31 August (2:20 pm)	Fitzroy	17.14 (116)	**18.18 (126)**	Won by 10 points	Princes Park (A)	10,968	9–10–1

== Ladder ==
(P)	Premiers
	Qualified for finals

#	Team	P	W	L	D	PF	PA	%	Pts
1	Essendon	20	16	3	1	1860	1428	130.3	66
2	Carlton (P)	20	15	5	0	1751	1343	130.4	60
3	Geelong	20	15	5	0	1528	1431	106.8	60
4	St Kilda	20	14	5	1	1718	1263	136.0	58
5	Richmond	20	14	6	0	1889	1536	123.0	56
6	Hawthorn	20	9	10	1	1934	1869	103.5	38
7	Collingwood	20	9	11	0	1623	1717	94.5	36
8	Melbourne	20	8	12	0	1434	1709	83.9	32
9	South Melbourne	20	6	13	1	1639	1954	83.9	26
10	Footscray	20	5	15	0	1413	1710	82.6	20
11	Fitzroy	20	4	16	0	1643	2035	80.7	16
12	North Melbourne	20	3	17	0	1266	1703	74.3	12

Rules for classification: 1. premiership points; 2. percentage; 3. points for
Average score: 82.1
Source: AFL Tables
