= 1997 Hawthorn Football Club season =

73rd season in the Australian Football League

Hawthorn Football Club
1997 season
- President: Ian Dicker
- Coach: Ken Judge
- Captain: Jason Dunstall
- Home ground: Waverley Park
- AFL season: 8–14 (15th)
- Finals series: Did not qualify
- Best and Fairest: Paul Salmon
- Leading goalkicker: Nick Holland (29)
- Highest home attendance: 51,494 (Round 10 vs. Collingwood)
- Lowest home attendance: 15,989 (Round 17 vs. Fremantle)
- Average home attendance: 32,380

The 1997 season was the Hawthorn Football Club's season 73rd season in the Australian Football League and 96th overall.

== Fixture ==
=== Premiership season ===
Rd	Date and local time	Opponent	Scores (Hawthorn's scores indicated in bold)			Venue	Attendance	Record
Rd	Date and local time	Opponent	Home	Away	Result	Venue	Attendance	Record
1	Saturday, 29 March (7:40 pm)	St Kilda	10.11 (71)	**11.11 (77)**	Won by 6 points	Waverley Park (A)	35,732	1–0
2	Sunday, 6 April (2:10 pm)	Fremantle	13.9 (87)	**10.13 (73)**	Lost by 14 points	Subiaco Oval (A)	19,057	1–1
3	Sunday, 13 April (2:10 pm)	Brisbane Lions	**12.15 (87)**	11.9 (75)	Won by 12 points	Waverley Park (H)	27,947	2–1
4	Saturday, 19 April (6:40 pm)	West Coast	17.10 (112)	**13.10 (88)**	Lost by 24 points	Subiaco Oval (A)	38,222	2–2
5	Saturday, 26 April (7:40 pm)	Sydney	**15.9 (99)**	11.8 (74)	Won by 25 points	Waverley Park (H)	37,576	3–2
6	Saturday, 3 May (7:40 pm)	North Melbourne	**14.9 (93)**	16.7 (103)	Lost by 10 points	Waverley Park (H)	38,953	3–3
7	Saturday, 10 May (2:10 pm)	Western Bulldogs	19.19 (133)	**13.10 (88)**	Lost by 45 points	Optus Oval (A)	18,860	3–4
8	Sunday, 18 May (2:10 pm)	Carlton	15.16 (106)	**12.9 (81)**	Lost by 25 points	Optus Oval (A)	29,783	3–5
9	Saturday, 24 May (2:10 pm)	Adelaide	**13.10 (88)**	14.18 (102)	Lost by 14 points	Waverley Park (H)	23,463	3–6
10	Saturday, 31 May (2:10 pm)	Collingwood	**16.12 (108)**	8.7 (55)	Won by 53 points	Waverley Park (H)	51,494	4–6
11	Saturday, 7 June (2:10 pm)	Essendon	13.13 (91)	**17.22 (124)**	Won by 33 points	Melbourne Cricket Ground (A)	60,594	5–6
12	Saturday, 14 June (2:10 pm)	Geelong	12.10 (82)	**13.10 (88)**	Won by 6 points	Kardinia Park (A)	22,871	6–6
13	Sunday, 29 June (2:10 pm)	Melbourne	**17.16 (118)**	7.13 (55)	Won by 63 points	Waverley Park (H)	31,517	7–6
14	Sunday, 6 July (2:10 pm)	Port Adelaide	**18.16 (124)**	13.14 (92)	Won by 32 points	Waverley Park (H)	29,886	8–6
15	Sunday, 13 July (2:10 pm)	Richmond	22.13 (145)	**10.9 (69)**	Lost by 76 points	Melbourne Cricket Ground (A)	49,217	8–7
16	Saturday, 19 July (2:10 pm)	St Kilda	**9.8 (62)**	20.21 (141)	Lost by 79 points	Waverley Park (H)	43,181	8–8
17	Saturday, 26 July (2:10 pm)	Fremantle	**9.8 (62)**	10.11 (71)	Lost by 9 points	Waverley Park (H)	15,939	8–9
18	Saturday, 2 August (7:40 pm)	Brisbane Lions	21.15 (141)	**11.5 (71)**	Lost by 70 points	The Gabba (A)	19,635	8–10
19	Saturday, 9 August (2:10 pm)	West Coast	**10.6 (66)**	13.9 (87)	Lost by 21 points	Waverley Park (H)	20,517	8–11
20	Sunday, 17 August (2:45 pm)	Sydney	20.15 (135)	**11.11 (77)**	Lost by 58 points	Sydney Cricket Ground (A)	34,111	8–12
21	Saturday, 23 August (2:10 pm)	North Melbourne	10.21 (81)	**6.7 (43)**	Lost by 38 points	Melbourne Cricket Ground (A)	26,393	8–13
22	Saturday, 30 August (2:10 pm)	Western Bulldogs	**13.9 (87)**	15.15 (105)	Lost by 18 points	Waverley Park (H)	35,706	8–14

== Ladder ==
(P)	Premiers
	Qualified for finals

#	Team	P	W	L	D	PF	PA	%	Pts
1	St Kilda	22	15	7	0	2294	1918	119.6	60
2	Geelong	22	15	7	0	2111	1791	117.9	60
3	Western Bulldogs	22	14	8	0	2100	2062	101.8	56
4	Adelaide (P)	22	13	9	0	2151	1769	121.6	52
5	West Coast	22	13	9	0	1969	1770	111.2	52
6	Sydney	22	12	10	0	2093	1801	116.2	48
7	North Melbourne	22	12	10	0	2051	1835	111.8	48
8	Brisbane Lions	22	10	11	1	2076	1973	105.2	42
9	Port Adelaide	22	10	11	1	1852	2017	91.8	42
10	Collingwood	22	10	12	0	2138	1919	111.4	40
11	Carlton	22	10	12	0	1978	2045	96.7	40
12	Fremantle	22	10	12	0	1748	1902	91.9	40
13	Richmond	22	10	12	0	1883	2253	83.6	40
14	Essendon	22	9	13	0	2004	2170	92.4	36
15	Hawthorn	22	8	14	0	1873	2144	87.4	32
16	Melbourne	22	4	18	0	1477	2429	60.8	16

Rules for classification: 1. premiership points; 2. percentage; 3. points for
Average score: 90.3
Source: AFL Tables
