= 1994 Hawthorn Football Club season =

70th season in the Australian Football League

Hawthorn Football Club
1994 season
- President: Geoff Lord
- Coach: Peter Knights
- Captain: Chris Langford
- Home ground: Waverley Park
- AFL season: 13–9 (6th)
- Finals series: Qualifying Final (lost to North Melbourne 91–114 (ET))
- Best and Fairest: John Platten
- Leading goalkicker: Jason Dunstall (101)
- Highest home attendance: 35,267 (Round 15 vs. Geelong)
- Lowest home attendance: 12,233 (Round 8 vs. Brisbane Bears)
- Average home attendance: 24,884

The 1994 season was the Hawthorn Football Club's 70th season in the Australian Football League and 93rd overall.

== Fixture ==
=== Premiership season ===
Rd	Date and local time	Opponent	Scores (Hawthorn's scores indicated in bold)			Venue	Attendance	Record
Rd	Date and local time	Opponent	Home	Away	Result	Venue	Attendance	Record
1	Saturday, 26 March (2:00 pm)	St Kilda	15.7 (97)	**23.15 (153)**	Won by 56 points	Waverley Park (A)	29,592	1–0
2	Saturday, 2 April (2:08 pm)	Melbourne	**8.16 (64)**	17.16 (118)	Lost by 54 points	Waverley Park (H)	29,581	1–1
3	Friday, 8 April (8:08 pm)	North Melbourne	25.23 (173)	**6.10 (46)**	Lost by 127 points	Melbourne Cricket Ground (A)	36,726	1–2
4	Saturday, 16 April (2:00 pm)	Carlton	**11.7 (73)**	24.16 (160)	Lost by 87 points	Waverley Park (H)	30,944	1–3
5	Sunday, 24 April (4:15 pm)	West Coast	8.10 (58)	**19.15 (129)**	Won by 71 points	Subiaco Oval (A)	27,357	2–3
6	Bye							
7	Saturday, 7 May (2:00 pm)	Essendon	**12.16 (88)**	11.9 (75)	Won by 13 points	Waverley Park (H)	33,927	3–3
8	Saturday, 14 May (2:00 pm)	Brisbane Bears	**25.16 (166)**	10.7 (67)	Won by 99 points	Waverley Park (H)	12,233	4–3
9	Sunday, 22 May (2:15 pm)	Hawthorn	7.6 (48)	**22.13 (145)**	Won by 97 points	Football Park (A)	44,403	5–3
10	Saturday, 28 May (2:00 pm)	Collingwood	16.14 (110)	**10.14 (74)**	Lost by 36 points	Victoria Park (A)	26,718	5–4
11	Sunday, 5 June (2:00 pm)	Footscray	**20.5 (125)**	8.13 (61)	Won by 64 points	Waverley Park (H)	22,895	6–4
12	Sunday, 12 June (1:15 pm)	Sydney	13.5 (83)	**21.15 (141)**	Won by 58 points	Sydney Cricket Ground (A)	12,251	7–4
13	Saturday, 18 June (2:00 pm)	Fitzroy	**7.11 (53)**	10.6 (66)	Lost by 13 points	Waverley Park (H)	17,599	7–5
14	Bye							
15	Saturday, 2 July (2:00 pm)	Geelong	**16.19 (115)**	11.13 (79)	Won by 36 points	Waverley Park (H)	35,267	8–5
16	Saturday, 9 July (2:00 pm)	St Kilda	**21.16 (142)**	11.12 (78)	Won by 64 points	Waverley Park (H)	25,037	9–5
17	Saturday, 16 July (2:00 pm)	Melbourne	17.10 (112)	**11.8 (74)**	Lost by 38 points	Optus Oval (A)	14,096	9–6
18	Saturday, 23 July (2:08 pm)	North Melbourne	**9.5 (59)**	15.9 (99)	Lost by 40 points	Waverley Park (H)	26,936	9–7
19	Saturday, 30 July (2:08 pm)	Carlton	15.14 (104)	**9.18 (72)**	Lost by 32 points	Optus Oval (A)	25,265	9–8
20	Saturday, 6 August (2:08 pm)	West Coast	**15.10 (100)**	7.12 (54)	Won by 46 points	Waverley Park (H)	16,328	10–8
21	Sunday, 14 August (2:00 pm)	Richmond	11.23 (89)	**18.9 (117)**	Won by 28 points	Melbourne Cricket Ground (A)	52,562	11–8
22	Sunday, 21 August (2:00 pm)	Essendon	20.16 (136)	**12.12 (84)**	Lost by 52 points	Melbourne Cricket Ground (A)	49,354	11–9
23	Sunday, 28 August (2:15 pm)	Brisbane Bears	13.13 (91)	**15.12 (102)**	Won by 11 points	The Gabba (A)	13,718	12–9
24	Saturday, 3 September (2:08 pm)	Adelaide	**9.12 (66)**	6.11 (47)	Won by 19 points	Waverley Park (H)	22,973	13–9

=== Finals series ===
Rd	Date and local time	Opponent	Scores (Hawthorn's scores indicated in bold)			Venue	Attendance
Rd	Date and local time	Opponent	Home	Away	Result	Venue	Attendance
Qualifying Final	Saturday, 10 September (2:30 pm)	North Melbourne	15.24 (114)	**13.13 (91)**	Lost by 23 points (extra time)	Waverley Park (A)	38,223

== Ladder ==
(P)	Premiers
	Qualified for finals

#	Team	P	W	L	D	PF	PA	%	Pts
1	West Coast (P)	22	16	6	0	2078	1572	132.2	64
2	Carlton	22	15	7	0	2351	1774	132.5	60
3	North Melbourne	22	13	9	0	2383	1848	129.0	52
4	Geelong	22	13	9	0	2403	2104	114.2	52
5	Footscray	22	13	9	0	2106	1905	110.6	52
6	Hawthorn	22	13	9	0	2188	2005	109.1	52
7	Melbourne	22	12	10	0	2190	1879	116.6	48
8	Collingwood	22	12	10	0	2017	2019	99.9	48
9	Richmond	22	12	10	0	2033	2167	93.8	48
10	Essendon	22	11	11	0	2075	2119	97.9	44
11	Adelaide	22	9	12	1	1876	2159	86.9	38
12	Brisbane Bears	22	9	13	0	1940	2195	88.4	36
13	St Kilda	22	7	14	1	1809	2415	74.9	30
14	Fitzroy	22	5	17	0	1726	2456	70.3	20
15	Sydney	22	4	18	0	1987	2545	78.1	16

Rules for classification: 1. premiership points; 2. percentage; 3. points for
Average score: 94.4
Source: AFL Tables
