= 1931 Hawthorn Football Club season =

7th season in the Victorian Football League

Hawthorn Football Club
1931 season
- President: J.W. Kennon
- Coach: John Harris
- Captain: John Harris
- Home ground: Glenferrie Oval
- VFL Season: 3–15 (11th)
- Finals Series: Did not qualify
- Best and Fairest: Unknown
- Leading goalkicker: Jack Ryan (39)
- Highest home attendance: 15,000 (Round 2 vs. Collingwood)
- Lowest home attendance: 4,000 (Round 10 vs. North Melbourne)
- Average home attendance: 8,889

The 1931 season was the Hawthorn Football Club's 7th season in the Victorian Football League and 30th overall.

== Schedule ==
=== Premiership season ===
Hawthorn played their round 7 and 8 games before their round 6 game due to round 6 being split with games played on either Monday, 8 June or Saturday, 27 June.

Rd	Date and local time	Opponent	Scores (Hawthorn's scores indicated in bold)			Venue	Attendance	Record
Rd	Date and local time	Opponent	Home	Away	Result	Venue	Attendance	Record
1	Saturday, 2 May (2:45 pm)	Footscray	8.13 (61)	**9.6 (60)**	Lost by 1 points	Western Oval (A)	12,000	0–1
2	Saturday, 9 May (2:45 pm)	Collingwood	**8.17 (65)**	11.18 (84)	Lost by 19 points	Glenferrie Oval (H)	15,000	0–2
3	Saturday, 16 May (2:45 pm)	St Kilda	10.12 (72)	**10.8 (68)**	Lost by 4 points	Junction Oval (A)	14,000	0–3
4	Saturday, 23 May (2:45 pm)	Melbourne	**13.16 (94)**	16.13 (109)	Lost by 15 points	Glenferrie Oval (H)	10,000	0–4
5	Saturday, 30 May (2:45 pm)	South Melbourne	**11.10 (76)**	11.13 (79)	Lost by 3 points	Glenferrie Oval (H)	11,000	0–5
6	Saturday, 27 June (2:45 pm)	Richmond	9.15 (69)	**8.10 (58)**	Lost by 11 points	Punt Road Oval (A)	19,000	0–6
7	Saturday, 13 June (2:45 pm)	Essendon	8.12 (60)	**12.8 (80)**	Won by 20 points	Windy Hill (A)	10,000	1–6
8	Saturday, 20 June (2:45 pm)	Fitzroy	**12.8 (80)**	7.14 (56)	Won by 24 points	Glenferrie Oval (H)	8,000	2–6
9	Saturday, 4 July (2:45 pm)	Geelong	13.9 (87)	**9.7 (61)**	Lost by 26 points	Corio Oval (A)	9,500	2–7
10	Saturday, 11 July (2:45 pm)	North Melbourne	**14.12 (96)**	3.6 (24)	Lost by 72 points	Glenferrie Oval (H)	4,000	3–7
11	Saturday, 18 July (2:45 pm)	Carlton	16.15 (111)	**5.8 (38)**	Lost by 73 points	Arden Street Oval (A)	17,000	3–8
12	Saturday, 25 July (2:45 pm)	Footscray	**8.5 (53)**	6.19 (55)	Lost by 2 points	Glenferrie Oval (H)	8,000	3–9
13	Saturday, 1 August (2:45 pm)	Collingwood	15.13 (103)	**7.16 (58)**	Lost by 45 points	Victoria Park (A)	9,000	3–10
14	Saturday, 8 August (2:45 pm)	St Kilda	**11.9 (75)**	11.11 (77)	Lost by 2 points	Glenferrie Oval (H)	8,000	3–11
15	Saturday, 22 August (2:45 pm)	Melbourne	13.15 (93)	**2.6 (18)**	Lost by 75 points	Melbourne Cricket Ground (A)	3,614	3–12
16	Saturday, 29 August (2:45 pm)	South Melbourne	12.18 (90)	**9.5 (59)**	Lost by 31 points	Lake Oval (A)	4,500	3–13
17	Saturday, 5 September (2:45 pm)	Richmond	**5.13 (43)**	13.21 (99)	Lost by 56 points	Glenferrie Oval (H)	11,000	3–14
18	Saturday, 12 September (2:45 pm)	Essendon	**8.15 (63)**	9.12 (66)	Lost by 3 points	Glenferrie Oval (H)	5,000	3–15

== Ladder ==
(P)	Premiers
	Qualified for finals

#	Team	P	W	L	D	PF	PA	%	Pts
1	Geelong (P)	18	15	3	0	1572	1038	151.4	60
2	Richmond	18	15	3	0	1627	1153	141.1	60
3	Carlton	18	12	6	0	1613	1289	125.1	48
4	Collingwood	18	12	6	0	1589	1281	124.0	48
5	Footscray	18	12	6	0	1161	1054	110.2	48
6	Essendon	18	10	8	0	1416	1428	99.2	40
7	South Melbourne	18	9	9	0	1393	1406	99.1	36
8	Melbourne	18	8	10	0	1286	1403	91.7	32
9	St Kilda	18	8	10	0	1323	1484	89.2	32
10	Fitzroy	18	4	14	0	1380	1605	86.0	16
11	Hawthorn	18	3	15	0	1145	1395	82.1	12
12	North Melbourne	18	0	18	0	1000	1969	50.8	0

Rules for classification: 1. premiership points; 2. percentage; 3. points for
Average score: 76.4
Source: AFL Tables
