= 1926 Hawthorn Football Club season =

Second season in the Victorian Football League

Hawthorn Football Club
1926 season
- President: J.W. Kennon
- Coach: Dan Minogue
- Captains: Pat Burke; Dan Minogue
- Home ground: Glenferrie Oval
- VFL Season: 3–14–1 (11th)
- Finals Series: Did not qualify
- Leading goalkicker: Bert Hyde (27)
- Highest home attendance: 16,000 (Round 1 vs. Carlton)
- Lowest home attendance: 4,500 (Round 13 vs. North Melbourne)
- Average home attendance: 8,611

The 1926 season was the Hawthorn Football Club's second season in the Victorian Football League and 25th overall since its creation in 1904.

== Fixture ==
=== Premiership season ===
Rd	Date and local time	Opponent	Scores (Hawthorn's scores indicated in bold)			Venue	Attendance	Record
Rd	Date and local time	Opponent	Home	Away	Result	Venue	Attendance	Record
1	Saturday, 1 May (2:45 pm)	Carlton	**6.14 (50)**	9.16 (70)	Lost by 20 points	Glenferrie Oval (H)	16,000	0–1
2	Saturday, 8 May (2:45 pm)	North Melbourne	5.8 (38)	**5.12 (42)**	Won by 4 points	Arden Street Oval (A)	7,000	1–1
3	Saturday, 15 May (2:45 pm)	Collingwood	**6.11 (47)**	17.17 (119)	Lost by 72 points	Glenferrie Oval (H)	13,000	1–2
4	Saturday, 22 May (2:45 pm)	Richmond	16.16 (112)	**14.16 (100)**	Lost by 12 points	Punt Road Oval (A)	14,000	1–3
5	Saturday, 29 May (2:45 pm)	Footscray	**9.13 (67)**	14.16 (100)	Lost by 33 points	Glenferrie Oval (H)	10,000	1–4
6	Saturday, 5 June (2:45 pm)	St Kilda	12.7 (79)	**6.14 (50)**	Lost by 29 points	Junction Oval (A)	10,000	1–5
7	Monday, 7 June (2:45 pm)	Fitzroy	11.15 (81)	**14.12 (96)**	Won by 15 points	Brunswick Street Oval (A)	8,000	2–5
8	Saturday, 19 June (2:45 pm)	Geelong	**10.12 (72)**	18.10 (118)	Lost by 46 points	Glenferrie Oval (H)	9,000	2–6
9	Saturday, 26 June (2:45 pm)	Melbourne	21.28 (154)	**1.7 (13)**	Lost by 141 points	Melbourne Cricket Ground (A)	7,514	2–7
10	Saturday, 3 July (2:45 pm)	South Melbourne	**8.10 (58)**	11.16 (82)	Lost by 24 points	Glenferrie Oval (H)	10,000	2–8
11	Saturday, 10 July (2:45 pm)	Essendon	11.8 (74)	**7.5 (47)**	Lost by 27 points	Windy Hill (A)	10,000	2–9
12	Saturday, 17 July (2:45 pm)	Carlton	8.17 (65)	**8.9 (57)**	Lost by 8 points	Princes Park (A)	12,000	2–10
13	Saturday, 7 August (2:45 pm)	North Melbourne	**10.10 (70)**	10.10 (70)	Draw	Glenferrie Oval (H)	4,500	2–10–1
14	Saturday, 14 August (2:45 pm)	Collingwood	16.8 (104)	**3.10 (28)**	Lost by 76 points	Victoria Park (A)	7,000	2–11–1
15	Saturday, 21 August (2:45 pm)	Richmond	**10.9 (69)**	14.18 (102)	Lost by 33 points	Glenferrie Oval (H)	5,000	2–12–1
16	Saturday, 28 August (2:45 pm)	Footscray	9.19 (73)	**11.14 (80)**	Won by 7 points	Western Oval (A)	5,000	3–12–1
17	Saturday, 4 September (2:45 pm)	St Kilda	**10.10 (70)**	12.14 (86)	Lost by 16 points	Glenferrie Oval (H)	5,000	3–13–1
18	Saturday, 11 September (2:45 pm)	Melbourne	**11.12 (78)**	18.13 (121)	Lost by 43 points	Glenferrie Oval (H)	5,000	3–14–1

== Ladder ==
(P)	Premiers
	Qualified for finals

#	Team	P	W	L	D	PF	PA	%	Pts
1	Collingwood	18	15	3	0	1604	1074	149.3	60
2	Geelong	18	15	3	0	1605	1105	145.2	60
3	Melbourne (P)	18	14	4	0	1720	1175	146.4	56
4	Essendon	18	12	6	0	1303	1048	124.3	48
5	South Melbourne	18	12	6	0	1408	1184	118.9	48
6	Carlton	18	11	7	0	1314	1234	106.5	44
7	Richmond	18	9	9	0	1376	1495	92.0	36
8	Fitzroy	18	6	12	0	1363	1583	86.1	24
9	St Kilda	18	6	12	0	1081	1427	75.8	24
10	Footscray	18	4	14	0	1164	1665	69.9	16
11	Hawthorn	18	3	14	1	1094	1648	66.4	14
12	North Melbourne	18	0	17	1	1102	1496	73.7	2

Rules for classification: 1. premiership points; 2. percentage; 3. points for
Average score: 74.7
Source: AFL Tables
