= 1981 Hawthorn Football Club season =

57th season in the Victorian Football League

Hawthorn Football Club
1981 season
- President: Ron Cook
- Coach: Allan Jeans
- Captain: Leigh Matthews
- Home ground: Princes Park
- VFL season: 13–9 (6th)
- Finals series: Did not qualify
- Best and Fairest: Terry Wallace
- Leading goalkicker: Leigh Matthews (48)
- Highest home attendance: 92,935 (Round 11 vs. Collingwood)
- Lowest home attendance: 7,992 (Round 22 vs. Melbourne)
- Average home attendance: 22,955

The 1981 season was the Hawthorn Football Club's 57th season in the Victorian Football League and 80th overall.

== Fixture ==
=== Premiership season ===
Rd	Date and local time	Opponent	Scores (Hawthorn's scores indicated in bold)			Venue	Attendance	Record
Rd	Date and local time	Opponent	Home	Away	Result	Venue	Attendance	Record
1	Saturday, 28 March (2:10 pm)	Melbourne	16.16 (112)	**23.15 (153)**	Won by 41 points	Melbourne Cricket Ground (A)	32,202	1–0
2	Saturday, 4 March (2:10 pm)	Carlton	**16.11 (107)**	17.21 (123)	Lost by 16 points	Princes Park (H)	30,159	1–1
3	Saturday, 11 April (2:10 pm)	South Melbourne	21.13 (139)	**18.9 (117)**	Lost by 22 points	VFL Park (A)	21,977	1–2
4	Monday, 20 April (2:10 pm)	Essendon	11.13 (79)	**13.16 (94)**	Won by 15 points	Windy Hill (A)	29,597	2–2
5	Saturday, 25 April (2:10 pm)	North Melbourne	**17.16 (118)**	11.17 (83)	Won by 35 points	Princes Park (H)	16,116	3–2
6	Saturday, 2 May (2:10 pm)	Richmond	10.19 (79)	**23.16 (154)**	Won by 75 points	Melbourne Cricket Ground (A)	45,750	4–2
7	Saturday, 9 May (2:10 pm)	Geelong	**8.8 (56)**	7.17 (59)	Lost by 3 points	Princes Park (H)	13,273	4–3
8	Saturday, 16 May (2:10 pm)	Fitzroy	**21.18 (144)**	16.19 (115)	Won by 29 points	Princes Park (H)	17,459	5–3
9	Saturday, 23 May (2:10 pm)	Footscray	10.14 (74)	**11.18 (84)**	Won by 10 points	Western Oval (A)	13,789	6–3
10	Saturday, 30 May (2:10 pm)	St Kilda	**13.17 (95)**	11.14 (80)	Won by 15 points	Princes Park (H)	14,961	7–3
11	Monday, 8 June (2:10 pm)	Collingwood	**18.19 (127)**	12.9 (81)	Won by 46 points	VFL Park (H)	92,935	8–3
12	Saturday, 13 June (2:10 pm)	Carlton	21.13 (139)	**14.16 (100)**	Lost by 39 points	Princes Park (A)	26,990	8–4
13	Saturday, 20 June (2:10 pm)	South Melbourne	**20.18 (138)**	15.16 (106)	Won by 32 points	Princes Park (H)	11,656	9–4
14	Sunday, 28 June (2:10 pm)	Essendon	**20.13 (133)**	22.19 (151)	Lost by 18 points	The Gabba (H)	20,351	9–5
15	Saturday, 4 July (2:10 pm)	North Melbourne	7.13 (55)	**16.19 (115)**	Won by 60 points	Arden Street Oval (A)	8,160	10–5
16	Saturday, 18 July (2:10 pm)	Richmond	**12.14 (86)**	20.11 (131)	Lost by 45 points	Princes Park (H)	19,617	10–6
17	Saturday, 25 July (2:10 pm)	Geelong	10.11 (71)	**8.9 (57)**	Lost by 14 points	Kardinia Park (A)	24,753	10–7
18	Saturday, 1 August (2:10 pm)	Fitzroy	10.13 (73)	**7.19 (61)**	Lost by 12 points	Junction Oval (A)	16,013	10–8
19	Saturday, 8 August (2:10 pm)	Footscray	**15.21 (111)**	13.12 (90)	Won by 21 points	Princes Park (H)	8,058	11–8
20	Saturday, 15 August (2:10 pm)	St Kilda	9.14 (68)	**10.17 (77)**	Won by 9 points	VFL Park (A)	20,863	12–8
21	Saturday, 22 August (2:10 pm)	Collingwood	22.17 (149)	**11.10 (76)**	Lost by 73 points	Victoria Park (A)	26,680	12–9
22	Saturday, 29 August (2:10 pm)	Melbourne	**15.20 (110)**	8.9 (57)	Won by 53 points	Princes Park (H)	7,922	13–9

== Ladder ==
(P)	Premiers
	Qualified for finals

#	Team	P	W	L	D	PF	PA	%	Pts
1	Carlton (P)	22	17	5	0	2303	1768	130.3	68
2	Collingwood	22	17	5	0	2399	1957	122.6	68
3	Geelong	22	16	6	0	2224	1714	129.8	64
4	Essendon	22	16	6	0	2323	1821	127.6	64
5	Fitzroy	22	14	8	0	2413	2152	112.1	56
6	Hawthorn	22	13	9	0	2313	2114	109.4	52
7	Richmond	22	13	9	0	2323	2207	105.3	52
8	North Melbourne	22	10	12	0	2386	2293	104.1	40
9	South Melbourne	22	8	14	0	2165	2522	85.8	32
10	St Kilda	22	5	17	0	1930	2266	85.2	20
11	Footscray	22	2	20	0	1764	2680	65.8	8
12	Melbourne	22	1	21	0	1824	2873	63.5	4

Rules for classification: 1. premiership points; 2. percentage; 3. points for
Average score: 99.9
Source: AFL Tables
