= 1945 Hawthorn Football Club season =

21st season in the Victorian Football League

Hawthorn Football Club
1945 season
- President: Dr. Jacob Jona
- Coach: Keith Shea
- Captain: Keith Shea
- Home ground: Glenferrie Oval
- VFL Season: 6–14 (10th)
- Finals Series: Did not qualify
- Best and Fairest: Jim Bohan
- Leading goalkicker: Alec Albiston (66)
- Highest home attendance: 13,000 (Round 5 vs. Richmond, Round 9 vs. South Melbourne)
- Lowest home attendance: 5,000 (Round 14 vs. St Kilda)
- Average home attendance: 9,050

The 1945 season was the Hawthorn Football Club's 21st season in the Victorian Football League and 44th overall.

== Fixture ==
=== Premiership Season ===
Rd	Date and local time	Opponent	Scores (Hawthorn's scores indicated in bold)			Venue	Attendance	Record
Rd	Date and local time	Opponent	Home	Away	Result	Venue	Attendance	Record
1	Saturday, 21 April (2:45 pm)	Essendon	22.18 (150)	**12.7 (79)**	Lost by 71 points	Windy Hill (A)	11,000	0–1
2	Saturday, 28 April (2:45 pm)	Carlton	**16.10 (106)**	9.18 (72)	Won by 34 points	Glenferrie Oval (H)	11,000	1–1
3	Saturday, 5 May (2:45 pm)	St Kilda	15.10 (100)	**11.13 (79)**	Lost by 21 points	Junction Oval (A)	10,000	1–2
4	Saturday, 12 May (2:45 pm)	Collingwood	13.23 (101)	**9.9 (63)**	Lost by 38 points	Victoria Park (A)	11,000	1–3
5	Saturday, 19 May (2:45 pm)	Richmond	**15.7 (97)**	20.11 (131)	Lost by 34 points	Glenferrie Oval (H)	13,000	1–4
6	Saturday, 26 May (2:45 pm)	Geelong	10.16 (76)	**10.8 (68)**	Lost by 8 points	Kardinia Park (A)	10,000	1–5
7	Saturday, 2 June (2:30 pm)	Footscray	**11.15 (81)**	17.14 (116)	Lost by 35 points	Glenferrie Oval (H)	10,000	1–6
8	Saturday, 9 June (2:30 pm)	North Melbourne	16.10 (106)	**10.8 (68)**	Lost by 38 points	Arden Street Oval (A)	7,000	1–7
9	Saturday, 16 June (2:30 pm)	South Melbourne	**12.10 (82)**	20.10 (130)	Lost by 48 points	Glenferrie Oval (H)	13,000	1–8
10	Saturday, 23 June (2:30 pm)	Melbourne	15.14 (104)	**12.14 (86)**	Lost by 18 points	Punt Road Oval (A)	6,000	1–9
11	Saturday, 30 June (2:30 pm)	Fitzroy	**7.8 (50)**	10.15 (75)	Lost by 25 points	Glenferrie Oval (H)	7,500	1–10
12	Saturday, 7 July (2:30 pm)	Essendon	**15.17 (107)**	7.12 (54)	Won by 53 points	Glenferrie Oval (H)	5,500	2–10
13	Saturday, 14 July (2:30 pm)	Carlton	13.12 (90)	**8.11 (59)**	Lost by 31 points	Princes Park (A)	10,000	2–11
14	Saturday, 21, July (2:30 pm)	St Kilda	**15.15 (105)**	13.3 (81)	Won by 24 points	Glenferrie Oval (H)	5,000	3–11
15	Saturday, 28 July (2:30 pm)	Collingwood	**9.13 (67)**	15.9 (99)	Lost by 32 points	Glenferrie Oval (H)	8,000	3–12
16	Saturday, 4 August (2:45 pm)	Richmond	15.15 (105)	**19.7 (121)**	Lost by 16 points	Punt Road Oval (A)	13,000	4–12
17	Saturday, 11 August (2:45 pm)	Geelong	**14.21 (105)**	9.13 (67)	Won by 38 points	Glenferrie Oval (H)	5,500	5–12
18	Saturday, 18 August (2:45 pm)	Footscray	15.15 (105)	**13.11 (89)**	Lost by 16 points	Western Oval (A)	12,000	5–13
19	Saturday, 25 August (2:45 pm)	North Melbourne	**11.11 (77)**	10.10 (70)	Won by 7 points	Glenferrie Oval (H)	12,000	6–13
20	Saturday, 1 September (2:45 pm)	South Melbourne	16.16 (112)	**11.10 (76)**	Lost by 36 points	Junction Oval (A)	12,000	6–14

== Ladder ==
(P)	Premiers
	Qualified for finals

#	Team	P	W	L	D	PF	PA	%	Pts
1	South Melbourne	20	16	4	0	1840	1396	131.8	64
2	Collingwood	20	15	5	0	1902	1477	128.8	60
3	North Melbourne	20	13	7	0	1696	1526	111.1	52
4	Carlton (P)	20	13	7	0	1718	1607	106.9	52
5	Footscray	20	12	8	0	1717	1576	108.9	48
6	Fitzroy	20	11	8	1	1730	1452	119.1	46
7	Richmond	20	11	9	0	1802	1742	103.4	44
8	Essendon	20	10	9	1	1837	1614	113.8	42
9	Melbourne	20	8	12	0	1683	1699	99.1	32
10	Hawthorn	20	6	14	0	1665	1944	85.6	24
11	Geelong	20	2	18	0	1415	2180	64.9	8
12	St Kilda	20	2	18	0	1305	2097	62.2	8

Rules for classification: 1. premiership points; 2. percentage; 3. points for
Average score: 84.6
Source: AFL Tables
