= 1993 Hawthorn Football Club season =

69th season in the Australian Football League

Hawthorn Football Club
1993 season
- President: Trevor Coote; Geoff Lord
- Coach: Alan Joyce
- Captain: Gary Ayres
- Home ground: Waverley Park
- AFL season: 13–7 (4th)
- Finals series: Elimination Final (lost to Adelaide 95–110)
- Best and Fairest: Jason Dunstall
- Leading goalkicker: Jason Dunstall (123)
- Highest home attendance: 55,287 (Elimination Final vs. Adelaide)
- Lowest home attendance: 13,397 (Round 17 vs. Sydney)
- Average home attendance: 29,597

The 1993 season was the Hawthorn Football Club's 69th season in the Australian Football League and 92nd overall.

== Fixture ==
=== Premiership season ===
Rd	Date and local time	Opponent	Scores (Hawthorn's scores indicated in bold)			Venue	Attendance	Record
Rd	Date and local time	Opponent	Home	Away	Result	Venue	Attendance	Record
1	Saturday, 27 March (2:00 pm)	Melbourne	**13.15 (93)**	11.4 (70)	Won by 23 points	Waverley Park (H)	25,098	1–0
2	Sunday, 4 April (2:15 pm)	Sydney	12.20 (92)	**22.17 (149)**	Won by 57 points	Sydney Cricket Ground (A)	10,144	2–0
3	Monday, 12 April (2:00 pm)	Carlton	16.16 (112)	**16.14 (110)**	Lost by 2 points	Princes Park (A)	33,274	2–1
4	Saturday, 17 April (2:00 pm)	Geelong	**11.13 (79)**	18.17 (125)	Lost by 46 points	Waverley Park (H)	31,492	2–2
5	Bye							
6	Friday, 30 April (8:38 pm)	Adelaide	12.16 (88)	**16.9 (105)**	Won by 17 points	Football Park (A)	46,689	3–2
7	Saturday, 8 May (2:00 pm)	Brisbane Bears	**16.17 (113)**	10.10 (70)	Won by 43 points	Waverley Park (H)	14,375	4–2
8	Saturday, 15 May (2:08 pm)	Collingwood	14.10 (94)	**10.16 (76)**	Lost by 18 points	Victoria Park (A)	29,880	4–3
9	Saturday, 22 May (2:00 pm)	Richmond	**20.11 (131)**	19.7 (121)	Won by 10 points	Waverley Park (H)	20,316	5–3
10	Saturday, 29 May (2:00 pm)	Footscray	9.8 (62)	**20.12 (132)**	Won by 70 points	Whitten Oval (A)	19,397	6–3
11	Monday, 14 June (2:08 pm)	Essendon	**12.14 (86)**	17.14 (116)	Lost by 30 points	Waverley Park (H)	47,295	6–4
12	Saturday, 19 June (2:00 pm)	St Kilda	**23.14 (152)**	11.8 (74)	Won by 78 points	Waverley Park (H)	28,975	7–4
13	Friday, 25 June (8:08 pm)	North Melbourne	11.14 (80)	**12.11 (83)**	Won by 3 points	Melbourne Cricket Ground (A)	47,705	8–4
14	Bye							
15	Saturday, 10 July (2:00 pm)	Fitzroy	**15.20 (110)**	9.10 (64)	Won by 46 points	Waverley Park (H)	21,744	9–4
16	Saturday, 17 July (2:08 pm)	Melbourne	12.18 (90)	**16.10 (106)**	Won by 16 points	Melbourne Cricket Ground (A)	44,303	10–4
17	Sunday, 25 July (2:00 pm)	Sydney	**24.15 (159)**	9.13 (67)	Won by 92 points	Waverley Park (H)	13,397	11–4
18	Saturday, 31 July (2:08 pm)	Carlton	**13.13 (91)**	17.20 (122)	Lost by 31 points	Waverley Park (H)	40,850	11–5
19	Saturday, 7 August (2:08 pm)	Geelong	22.18 (150)	**10.8 (68)**	Lost by 82 points	Kardinia Park (A)	25,817	11–6
20	Sunday, 15 August (2:00 pm)	West Coast	10.7 (67)	**6.9 (45)**	Lost by 22 points	Subiaco Oval (A)	41,988	11–7
21	Saturday, 21 August (2:08 pm)	Adelaide	**17.13 (115)**	13.10 (88)	Won by 27 points	Waverley Park (H)	26,540	12–7
22	Sunday, 29 August (1:15 pm)	Brisbane Bears	15.16 (106)	**24.19 (163)**	Won by 57 points	The Gabba (A)	11,544	13–7

=== Finals series ===
Rd	Date and local time	Opponent	Scores (Hawthorn's scores indicated in bold)			Venue	Attendance
Rd	Date and local time	Opponent	Home	Away	Result	Venue	Attendance
Elimination Final	Sunday, 5 September (2:30 pm)	Adelaide	**13.17 (95)**	16.14 (110)	Lost by 15 points	Melbourne Cricket Ground (H)	55,287

== Ladder ==
(P)	Premiers
	Qualified for finals

#	Team	P	W	L	D	PF	PA	%	Pts
1	Essendon (P)	20	13	6	1	2333	1959	119.1	54
2	Carlton	20	13	6	1	2315	1968	117.6	54
3	North Melbourne	20	13	7	0	2597	2150	120.8	52
4	Hawthorn	20	13	7	0	2166	1858	116.6	52
5	Adelaide	20	12	8	0	2168	1840	117.8	48
6	West Coast	20	12	8	0	1912	1651	115.8	48
7	Geelong	20	12	8	0	2354	2109	111.6	48
8	Collingwood	20	11	9	0	2086	2060	101.3	44
9	Footscray	20	11	9	0	1978	1997	99.0	44
10	Melbourne	20	10	10	0	2101	1873	112.2	40
11	Fitzroy	20	10	10	0	2001	2011	99.5	40
12	St Kilda	20	10	10	0	2040	2166	94.2	40
13	Brisbane Bears	20	4	16	0	1886	2504	75.3	16
14	Richmond	20	4	16	0	1753	2480	70.7	16
15	Sydney	20	1	19	0	1837	2901	63.3	4

Rules for classification: 1. premiership points; 2. percentage; 3. points for
Average score: 105.1
Source: AFL Tables
