= Alf Gough (footballer, born 1884) =

Australian rules footballer

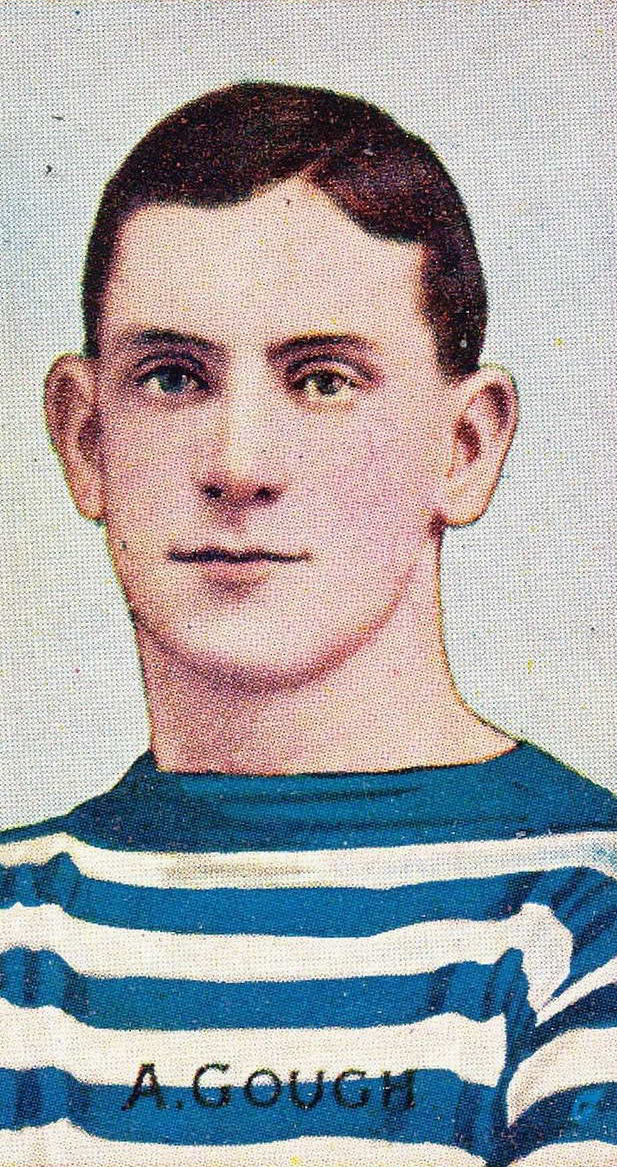
- Cigarette card of Gough in 1908

Personal information
- Full name: Alfred James Gough
- Nickname: Mac
- Born: 4 June 1884; Geelong, Victoria
- Died: 28 July 1952 (aged 68); Neutral Bay, New South Wales
- Original team: Barwon
- Height: 183 cm (6 ft 0 in)
- Weight: 82 kg (181 lb)
- Position: Ruckman

Playing career^{1}
Years	Club	Games (Goals)
1903	Carlton	1 (0)
1905–1907	Geelong	44 (13)
1908–1913	Essendon Assocation	95 (38)
1914–1915	Hawthorn (VFA)	28 (10)
- ^{1} Playing statistics correct to the end of 1915.

Career highlights
- 1911 VFA Premiership; 1912 VFA Premiership

Alfred James Gough (4 June 1884 – 28 July 1952) was an Australian rules footballer who played for the Carlton Football Club and Geelong Football Club in the Victorian Football League (VFL).

== Family ==
The second son of coach painter Mark Gough (1860–1914) and Ellen Colley (1861–1909), Alfred James Gough was born in Geelong on 4 June 1884.

== Football ==
=== Barwon ===
Gough played for the Barwon Football Club in Geelong from 1901 to 1905

=== Carlton ===
Gough made a single appearance for Carlton in the 1903 VFL season, their Round 14 loss to Melbourne. He returned to Barwon the week after playing for Carlton.

=== Geelong ===
Gough made his debut for Geelong in Round 6 of the 1905 VFL season against Collingwood. He quickly established himself as a regular in the side, and he played every game from his debut until he missed two games near the end of the 1907 season when he injured his shoulder.

=== Essendon Association (VFA) ===
In 1908 Gough moved to Melbourne where he played for Essendon Town in the Victorian Football Association (VFA) from 1908 to 1913. He was a member of Essendon’s premiership sides in both 1911 and 1912.

=== Hawthorn (VFA) ===
In 1914 Alf Gough was appointed as the inaugural captain and coach of the Hawthorn Football Club when they were accepted into the Victorian Football Association (VFA). He continued in this role until the VFA went into recess in 1915 due to World War I.
