= 1982 Hawthorn Football Club season =

58th season in the Victorian Football League

Hawthorn Football Club
1982 season
- President: Ron Cook
- Coach: Allan Jeans
- Captain: Leigh Matthews
- Home ground: Princes Park
- VFL season: 17–5 (2nd)
- Finals series: Preliminary Final (lost to Carlton 63–94)
- Best and Fairest: Leigh Matthews
- Leading goalkicker: Leigh Matthews (74)
- Highest home attendance: 70,552 (Qualifying Final vs. Carlton)
- Lowest home attendance: 13,467 (Round 22 vs. St Kilda)
- Average home attendance: 26,695

The 1982 season was the Hawthorn Football Club's 58th season in the Victorian Football League and 81st overall. This was the first time since 1978 Hawthorn qualified for finals. Hawthorn were eliminated by Carlton in the Preliminary final 63–94.

== Fixture ==
=== Premiership season ===
| Rd | Date and local time | Opponent | Scores (Hawthorn's scores indicated in bold) | | | Venue | Attendance | Record |
| Rd | Date and local time | Opponent | Home | Away | Result | Venue | Attendance | Record |
|---|---|---|---|---|---|---|---|---|
| 1 | Saturday, 27 March (2:10 pm) | St Kilda | 12.16 (88) | **17.17 (119)** | Won by 31 points | Moorabbin Oval (A) | 19,719 | 1–0 |
| 2 | Saturday, 3 April (2:10 pm) | Geelong | **13.19 (97)** | 11.12 (78) | Won by 19 points | Princes Park (H) | 15,600 | 2–0 |
| 3 | Monday, 12 April (2:10 pm) | Footscray | **28.26 (194)** | 7.9 (51) | Won by 145 points | VFL Park (H) | 22,209 | 3–0 |
| 4 | Saturday, 17 April (2:10 pm) | Carlton | 21.22 (148) | **12.15 (87)** | Lost by 61 points | Princes Park (A) | 29,654 | 3–1 |
| 5 | Saturday, 24 April (2:10 pm) | Richmond | **13.22 (100)** | 10.22 (82) | Won by 18 points | Princes Park (H) | 20,210 | 4–1 |
| 6 | Saturday, 1 May (2:10 pm) | North Melbourne | 15.11 (101) | **19.21 (135)** | Won by 34 points | VFL Park (A) | 34,921 | 5–1 |
| 7 | Saturday, 8 May (2:10 pm) | Fitzroy | 19.15 (129) | **17.15 (117)** | Lost by 12 points | Junction Oval (A) | 14,675 | 5–2 |
| 8 | Saturday, 15 May (2:10 pm) | Essendon | **15.15 (105)** | 16.15 (111) | Lost by 6 points | Princes Park (H) | 26,875 | 5–3 |
| 9 | Saturday, 22 May (2:10 pm) | Collingwood | 13.14 (92) | **17.12 (114)** | Won by 22 points | Victoria Park (A) | 21,831 | 6–3 |
| 10 | Sunday, 30 May (2:10 pm) | Swans | 15.13 (103) | **24.13 (157)** | Won by 54 points | Sydney Cricket Ground (A) | 15,420 | 7–3 |
| 11 | Saturday, 5 June (2:10 pm) | Melbourne | **26.22 (178)** | 14.15 (99) | Won by 79 points | Princes Park (H) | 14,087 | 8–3 |
| 12 | Monday, 14 June (2:10 pm) | Geelong | 6.17 (53) | **17.10 (112)** | Won by 59 points | VFL Park (A) | 38,086 | 9–3 |
| 13 | Saturday, 19 June (2:10 pm) | Footscray | 16.11 (107) | **12.20 (92)** | Lost by 15 points | Western Oval (A) | 10,530 | 9–4 |
| 14 | Saturday, 26 June (2:10 pm) | Carlton | **17.14 (116)** | 12.10 (82) | Won by 34 points | Princes Park (H) | 23,354 | 10–4 |
| 15 | Saturday, 3 July (2:10 pm) | Richmond | 17.14 (116) | **22.14 (146)** | Won by 30 points | Melbourne Cricket Ground (A) | 48,338 | 11–4 |
| 16 | Saturday, 10 July (2:10 pm) | North Melbourne | **32.14 (206)** | 15.22 (112) | Won by 94 points | Princes Park (H) | 18,819 | 12–4 |
| 17 | Saturday, 24 July (2:10 pm) | Fitzroy | **18.15 (123)** | 27.8 (170) | Lost by 47 points | VFL Park (H) | 25,316 | 12–5 |
| 18 | Saturday, 31 July (2:10 pm) | Essendon | 12.10 (82) | **15.10 (100)** | Won by 18 points | Windy Hill (A) | 22,993 | 13–5 |
| 19 | Saturday, 7 August (2:10 pm) | Collingwood | **20.20 (140)** | 16.22 (118) | Won by 22 points | Princes Park Football Ground (H) | 19,079 | 14–5 |
| 20 | Saturday, 14 August (2:10 pm) | Swans | **18.18 (126)** | 8.14 (62) | Won by 64 points | Princes Park (H) | 15,743 | 15–5 |
| 21 | Saturday, 21 August (2:10 pm) | Melbourne | 14.8 (92) | **14.19 (103)** | Won by 11 points | Melbourne Cricket Ground (A) | 26,049 | 16–5 |
| 22 | Saturday, 28 August (2:10 pm) | St Kilda | **23.23 (161)** | 11.7 (73) | Won by 88 points | Princes Park (H) | 13,467 | 17–5 |

=== Finals series ===
| Rd | Date and local time | Opponent | Scores (Hawthorn's scores indicated in bold) | | | Venue | Attendance |
| Rd | Date and local time | Opponent | Home | Away | Result | Venue | Attendance |
|---|---|---|---|---|---|---|---|
| Qualifying Final | Saturday, 4 September (2:30 pm) | Carlton | **16.9 (105)** | 25.13 (163) | Lost by 58 points | Melbourne Cricket Ground (H) | 70,552 |
| First Semi-Final | Saturday, 11 September (2:30 pm) | North Melbourne | **24.22 (166)** | 18.6 (114) | Won by 52 points | Melbourne Cricket Ground (H) | 61,729 |
| Preliminary Final | Saturday, 18 September (2:30 pm) | Carlton | 13.16 (94) | **8.15 (63)** | Lost by 31 points | VFL Park (A) | 61,307 |

== Ladder ==
| (P) | Premiers |
| | Qualified for finals |

| # | Team | P | W | L | D | PF | PA | % | Pts |
|---|---|---|---|---|---|---|---|---|---|
| 1 | Richmond | 22 | 18 | 4 | 0 | 2682 | 2125 | 126.2 | 72 |
| 2 | Hawthorn | 22 | 17 | 5 | 0 | 2828 | 2149 | 131.6 | 68 |
| 3 | Carlton (P) | 22 | 16 | 5 | 1 | 2561 | 2008 | 127.5 | 66 |
| 4 | Essendon | 22 | 16 | 6 | 0 | 2576 | 2057 | 125.2 | 64 |
| 5 | North Melbourne | 22 | 14 | 8 | 0 | 2693 | 2458 | 109.6 | 56 |
| 6 | Fitzroy | 22 | 12 | 9 | 1 | 2614 | 2550 | 102.5 | 50 |
| 7 | Swans | 22 | 12 | 10 | 0 | 2621 | 2537 | 103.3 | 48 |
| 8 | Melbourne | 22 | 8 | 14 | 0 | 2488 | 2752 | 90.4 | 32 |
| 9 | Geelong | 22 | 7 | 15 | 0 | 2073 | 2293 | 90.4 | 28 |
| 10 | Collingwood | 22 | 4 | 18 | 0 | 2201 | 2575 | 85.5 | 16 |
| 11 | St Kilda | 22 | 4 | 18 | 0 | 2188 | 3052 | 71.7 | 16 |
| 12 | Footscray | 22 | 3 | 19 | 0 | 2066 | 3035 | 68.1 | 12 |

Rules for classification: 1. premiership points; 2. percentage; 3. points for
Average score: 112.1
Source: AFL Tables
