= 1988 Hawthorn Football Club season =

64th season in the Victorian Football League

Hawthorn Football Club
1988 season
- President: Trevor Coote
- Coach: Alan Joyce
- Captain: Michael Tuck
- Home ground: Princes Park
- VFL season: 19–3 (1st)
- Finals series: Premiers (Defeated Melbourne 152–56)
- Best and Fairest: Jason Dunstall
- Leading goalkicker: Jason Dunstall (132)
- Highest home attendance: 93,754 (Grand Final vs. Melbourne)
- Lowest home attendance: 8,176 (Round 12 vs. Brisbane Bears)
- Average home attendance: 25,908

The 1988 season was the Hawthorn Football Club's 64th season in the Victorian Football League and 87th overall.

== Fixture ==
=== Premiership season ===
Rd	Date and local time	Opponent	Scores (Hawthorn's scores indicated in bold)			Venue	Attendance	Record
Rd	Date and local time	Opponent	Home	Away	Result	Venue	Attendance	Record
1	Saturday, 2 April (2:10 pm)	Carlton	18.18 (126)	**15.21 (111)**	Lost by 15 points	Princes Park (A)	27,266	0–1
2	Saturday, 9 April (2:10 pm)	Richmond	**26.15 (171)**	12.14 (86)	Won by 85 points	VFL Park (H)	18,082	1–1
3	Saturday, 16 April (2:10 pm)	Sydney	**17.12 (114)**	13.15 (93)	Won by 21 points	Princes Park (H)	9,802	2–1
4	Saturday, 23 April (2:10 pm)	Fitzroy	**17.18 (120)**	15.16 (106)	Won by 14 points	Princes Park (H)	13,205	3–1
5	Saturday, 30 April (2:10 pm)	North Melbourne	19.14 (128)	**31.19 (205)**	Won by 77 points	Melbourne Cricket Ground (A)	15,438	4–1
6	Saturday, 7 May (2:10 pm)	Collingwood	13.13 (91)	**14.9 (93)**	Won by 2 points	VFL Park (A)	53,184	5–1
7	Saturday, 14 May (2:10 pm)	Melbourne	15.21 (111)	**13.12 (90)**	Lost by 21 points	Melbourne Cricket Ground (A)	34,773	5–2
8	Sunday, 22 May (2:10 pm)	West Coast	9.9 (63)	**17.14 (116)**	Won by 53 points	Subiaco Oval (A)	27,344	6–2
9	Saturday, 28 May (2:10 pm)	Footscray	**23.16 (154)**	9.11 (65)	Won by 89 points	Princes Park (H)	12,786	7–2
10	Saturday, 4 June (2:10 pm)	St Kilda	17.19 (121)	**21.11 (137)**	Won by 16 points	Melbourne Cricket Ground (A)	25,693	8–2
11	Monday, 13 June (2:10 pm)	Essendon	**17.16 (118)**	10.8 (68)	Won by 50 points	Princes Park (H)	27,642	9–2
12	Saturday, 18 June (2:10 pm)	Brisbane Bears	**10.20 (80)**	2.5 (17)	Won by 63 points	Princes Park (H)	8,176	10–2
13	Saturday, 25 June (2:10 pm)	Geelong	**17.10 (112)**	12.15 (87)	Won by 25 points	Princes Park (H)	13,867	11–2
14	Saturday, 2 July (2:10 pm)	Footscray	11.11 (77)	**15.15 (105)**	Won by 28 points	Western Oval (A)	14,338	12–2
15	Sunday, 10 July (2:10 pm)	Brisbane Bears	12.19 (91)	**17.13 (115)**	Won by 24 points	Carrara Stadium (A)	14,213	13–2
16	Sunday, 17 July (2:10 pm)	Sydney	24.19 (163)	**16.16 (112)**	Lost by 51 points	Sydney Cricket Ground (A)	14,591	13–3
17	Saturday, 23 July (2:10 pm)	Melbourne	10.8 (68)	**21.11 (137)**	Won by 69 points	VFL Park (A)	37,307	14–3
18	Saturday, 30 July (2:10 pm)	Essendon	**12.16 (88)**	9.8 (62)	Won by 26 points	VFL Park (H)	35,662	15–3
19	Saturday, 6 August (2:10 pm)	Fitzroy	**27.16 (178)**	15.14 (104)	Won by 74 points	Princes Park (H)	12,646	16–3
20	Sunday, 14 August (2:10 pm)	Geelong	**10.8 (68)**	19.14 (128)	Won by 60 points	Kardinia Park (A)	23,821	17–3
21	Saturday, 20 August (2:10 pm)	St Kilda	**18.15 (123)**	11.12 (78)	Won by 45 points	VFL Park (H)	19,222	18–3
22	Saturday, 27 August (2:10 pm)	North Melbourne	**28.16 (184)**	13.11 (89)	Won by 95 points	Princes Park (H)	11,903	19–3

=== Finals series ===
Rd	Date and local time	Opponent	Scores (Hawthorn's scores indicated in bold)			Venue	Attendance
Rd	Date and local time	Opponent	Home	Away	Result	Venue	Attendance
2nd semi-final	Saturday, 10 September (2:30 pm)	Carlton	**9.12 (66)**	6.9 (45)	Won by 21 points	VFL Park (H)	60,052
Grand Final	Saturday, 24 September (2:50 pm)	Melbourne	**22.20 (152)**	6.20 (56)	Won by 96 points	Melbourne Cricket Ground (H)	93,754

== Ladder ==
(P)	Premiers
	Qualified for finals

#	Team	P	W	L	D	PF	PA	%	Pts
1	Hawthorn (P)	22	19	3	0	2791	1962	142.3	76
2	Collingwood	22	15	6	1	1948	1728	112.7	62
3	Carlton	22	15	7	0	2342	1961	119.4	60
4	West Coast	22	13	9	0	2199	1966	111.9	52
5	Melbourne	22	13	9	0	2003	1961	102.1	52
6	Essendon	22	12	10	0	2186	2017	108.4	48
7	Sydney	22	12	10	0	2169	2176	99.7	48
8	Footscray	22	11	11	0	1880	1803	104.3	44
9	Geelong	22	10	12	0	2356	2246	104.9	40
10	Richmond	22	8	14	0	2161	2540	85.1	32
11	North Melbourne	22	7	14	1	2361	2638	89.5	30
12	Fitzroy	22	7	15	0	2128	2538	83.8	28
13	Brisbane Bears	22	7	15	0	1806	2421	74.6	28
14	St Kilda	22	4	18	0	1708	2081	82.1	16

Rules for classification: 1. premiership points; 2. percentage; 3. points for
Average score: 97.5
Source: AFL Tables
