= 1989 Hawthorn Football Club season =

65th season in the Victorian Football League

Hawthorn Football Club
1989 season
- President: Trevor Coote
- Coach: Allan Jeans
- Captain: Michael Tuck
- Home ground: Princes Park
- VFL season: 19–3 (1st)
- Finals series: Premiers (Defeated Geelong 144–138)
- Best and Fairest: Jason Dunstall
- Leading goalkicker: Jason Dunstall (138)
- Highest home attendance: 94,796 (Grand Final vs. Geelong)
- Lowest home attendance: 6,292 (Round 13 vs. Brisbane Bears)
- Average home attendance: 27,390

The 1989 season was the Hawthorn Football Club's 65th season in the Victorian Football League and 88th overall. Hawthorn entered the season as the defending VFL Premiers

== Fixture ==
=== Premiership season ===
Rd	Date and local time	Opponent	Scores (Hawthorn's scores indicated in bold)			Venue	Attendance	Record
Rd	Date and local time	Opponent	Home	Away	Result	Venue	Attendance	Record
1	Saturday, 1 April (2:10 pm)	Collingwood	13.15 (93)	**11.17 (83)**	Lost by 10 points	VFL Park (A)	50,287	0–1
2	Saturday, 8 April (2:10 pm)	North Melbourne	11.6 (72)	**21.15 (141)**	Won by 69 points	VFL Park (A)	18,939	1–1
3	Saturday, 15 April (2:10 pm)	Essendon	**20.15 (135)**	13.13 (91)	Won by 44 points	Princes Park (H)	23,922	2–1
4	Tuesday, 25 April (2:10 pm)	Richmond	9.12 (66)	**15.20 (110)**	Won by 44 points	VFL Park (A)	41,347	3–1
5	Saturday, 29 April (2:10 pm)	Carlton	**18.17 (125)**	10.11 (71)	Won by 54 points	VFL Park (H)	31,827	4–1
6	Saturday, 6 May (2:10 pm)	Geelong	**26.15 (171)**	25.13 (163)	Won by 8 points	Princes Park (H)	17,430	5–1
7	Saturday, 13 May (2:10 pm)	Fitzroy	**25.15 (165)**	13.6 (84)	Won by 81 points	Princes Park (H)	16,316	6–1
8	Saturday, 20 May (2:10 pm)	Sydney	**22.25 (157)**	12.11 (83)	Won by 74 points	Princes Park (H)	13,148	7–1
9	Sunday, 28 May (2:10 pm)	Footscray	10.13 (73)	**17.15 (117)**	Won by 44 points	Western Oval (A)	16,437	8–1
10	Sunday, 4 June (2:10 pm)	West Coast	15.15 (105)	**16.14 (110)**	Won by 5 points	Subiaco Oval (A)	20,219	9–1
11	Monday, 12 June (2:10 pm)	Melbourne	**8.6 (54)**	10.9 (69)	Lost by 15 points	Princes Park (H)	21,396	9–2
12	Saturday, 17 June (2:10 pm)	St Kilda	8.6 (54)	**10.12 (72)**	Won by 18 points	Moorabbin Oval (A)	18,124	10–2
13	Friday, 23 June (7:40 pm)	Brisbane Bears	**15.16 (106)**	4.11 (35)	Won by 71 points	VFL Park (H)	6,292	11–2
14	Saturday, 8 July (2:10 pm)	West Coast	**19.27 (141)**	6.14 (50)	Won by 91 points	Princes Park (H)	7,894	12–2
15	Sunday, 16 July (2:10 pm)	Richmond	15.14 (104)	**22.10 (142)**	Won by 38 points	Melbourne Cricket Ground (A)	17,894	13–2
16	Saturday, 22 July (2:10 pm)	Collingwood	**21.11 (137)**	11.11 (77)	Won by 60 points	Princes Park (H)	21,487	14–2
17	Saturday, 29 July (2:10 pm)	North Melbourne	9.24 (78)	**23.16 (154)**	Won by 76 points	VFL Park (A)	15,523	15–2
18	Saturday, 5 August (2:10 pm)	Carlton	14.6 (90)	**14.11 (95)**	Won by 5 points	VFL Park (A)	33,615	16–2
19	Saturday, 12 August (2:10 pm)	Melbourne	9.9 (63)	**12.15 (87)**	Won by 24 points	VFL Park (A)	28,117	17–2
20	Sunday, 20 August (2:10 pm)	Brisbane Bears	12.5 (77)	**9.7 (61)**	Lost by 16 points	Carrara Stadium (A)	9,093	17–3
21	Saturday, 26 August (2:10 pm)	Footscray	**19.20 (134)**	8.11 (59)	Won by 75 points	Princes Park (H)	10,022	18–3
22	Saturday, 2 September (2:10 pm)	St Kilda	**28.13 (181)**	13.13 (91)	Won by 90 points	VFL Park (H)	25,532	19–3

=== Finals series ===
Rd	Date and local time	Opponent	Scores (Hawthorn's scores indicated in bold)			Venue	Attendance
Rd	Date and local time	Opponent	Home	Away	Result	Venue	Attendance
2nd semi-final	Saturday, 16 September (2:30 pm)	Essendon	**16.16 (112)**	11.10 (76)	Won by 36 points	VFL Park (H)	66,003
Grand Final	Saturday, 30 September (2:50 pm)	Geelong	**21.18 (144)**	21.12 (138)	Won by 6 points	Melbourne Cricket Ground (H)	94,796

== Ladder ==
(P)	Premiers
	Qualified for finals

#	Team	P	W	L	D	PF	PA	%	Pts
1	Hawthorn (P)	22	19	3	0	2678	1748	153.2	76
2	Essendon	22	17	5	0	2240	1705	131.4	68
3	Geelong	22	16	6	0	2916	1987	146.8	64
4	Melbourne	22	14	8	0	1876	1944	96.5	56
5	Collingwood	22	13	9	0	2216	1964	112.8	52
6	Fitzroy	22	12	10	0	2069	2125	97.4	48
7	Sydney	22	11	11	0	1959	1958	100.1	44
8	Carlton	22	9	12	1	1921	2079	92.4	38
9	North Melbourne	22	9	13	0	2061	2301	89.6	36
10	Brisbane Bears	22	8	14	0	1792	2274	78.8	32
11	West Coast	22	7	15	0	1948	2247	86.7	28
12	St Kilda	22	7	15	0	2108	2502	84.3	28
13	Footscray	22	6	15	1	1614	1855	87.0	26
14	Richmond	22	5	17	0	1725	2434	70.9	20

Rules for classification: 1. premiership points; 2. percentage; 3. points for
Average score: 94.6
Source: AFL Tables
