= 1992 Hawthorn Football Club season =

68th season in the Australian Football League

Hawthorn Football Club
1992 season
- President: Trevor Coote
- Coach: Alan Joyce
- Captain: Gary Ayres
- Home ground: Waverley Park
- AFL season: 14–8 (5th)
- Finals series: Elimination final (lost to West Coast 87–100)
- Best and Fairest: Jason Dunstall
- Leading goalkicker: Jason Dunstall (145)
- Highest home attendance: 53,369 (Round 21 vs. Collingwood)
- Lowest home attendance: 17,096 (Round 18 vs. North Melbourne)
- Average home attendance: 32,045

The 1992 season was the Hawthorn Football Club's 68th season in the Australian Football League and 91st overall. Hawthorn entered the season as the defending AFL Premiers.

== Fixture ==
=== Premiership season ===
| Rd | Date and local time | Opponent | Scores (Hawthorn's scores indicated in bold) | | | Venue | Attendance | Record |
| Rd | Date and local time | Opponent | Home | Away | Result | Venue | Attendance | Record |
|---|---|---|---|---|---|---|---|---|
| 1 | Saturday, 21 March (2:10 pm) | Geelong | **21.15 (141)** | 18.13 (121) | Won by 20 points | Waverley Park (H) | 34,677 | 1–0 |
| 2 | Saturday, 28 March (2:10 pm) | Carlton | 17.13 (115) | **12.17 (89)** | Lost by 26 points | Princes Park (A) | 25,689 | 1–1 |
| 3 | Saturday, 4 April (2:10 pm) | North Melbourne | 10.15 (75) | **14.17 (101)** | Won by 26 points | Melbourne Cricket Ground (A) | 25,323 | 2–1 |
| 4 | Saturday, 11 April (2:10 pm) | St Kilda | 16.12 (108) | **14.14 (98)** | Lost by 10 points | Moorabbin Oval (A) | 27,350 | 2–2 |
| 5 | Saturday, 18 April (2:10 pm) | Essendon | **16.18 (114)** | 22.9 (141) | Lost by 27 points | Waverley Park (H) | 32,509 | 2–3 |
| 6 | Saturday, 25 April (2:10 pm) | Collingwood | 17.9 (111) | **20.15 (135)** | Won by 24 points | Waverley Park (A) | 72,765 | 3–3 |
| 7 | Saturday, 2 May (2:10 pm) | Richmond | **25.22 (172)** | 14.9 (93) | Won by 79 points | Waverley Park (H) | 26,789 | 4–3 |
| 8 | Bye | | | | | | | |
| 9 | Saturday, 16 May (2:10 pm) | Melbourne | **18.12 (120)** | 7.6 (48) | Won by 72 points | Waverley Park (H) | 22,686 | 5–3 |
| 10 | Sunday, 24 May (2:10 pm) | Sydney | 12.13 (85) | **21.20 (146)** | Won by 61 points | Sydney Cricket Ground (A) | 12,217 | 6–3 |
| 11 | Sunday, 31 May (2:10 pm) | Footscray | 16.13 (109) | **11.9 (75)** | Lost by 34 points | Whitten Oval (A) | 25,829 | 6–4 |
| 12 | Monday, 8 June (2:10 pm) | Adelaide | **15.12 (102)** | 15.13 (103) | Lost by 1 point | Waverley Park (H) | 21,119 | 6–5 |
| 13 | Saturday, 13 June (2:10 pm) | Fitzroy | **22.13 (145)** | 13.11 (89) | Won by 56 points | Waverley Park (H) | 22,289 | 7–5 |
| 14 | Saturday, 20 June (2:10 pm) | West Coast | **8.12 (60)** | 11.8 (74) | Lost by 14 points | Waverley Park (H) | 26,346 | 7–6 |
| 15 | Sunday, 28 June (2:10 pm) | Brisbane Bears | 15.14 (104) | **16.12 (108)** | Won by 4 points | Carrara Stadium (A) | 7,573 | 8–6 |
| 16 | Saturday, 4 July (2:10 pm) | Geelong | 14.11 (95) | **16.18 (114)** | Won by 19 points | Kardinia Park (A) | 26,257 | 9–6 |
| 17 | Saturday, 11 July (2:10 pm) | Carlton | **7.12 (54)** | 9.12 (66) | Lost by 12 points | Waverley Park (H) | 52,481 | 9–7 |
| 18 | Saturday, 18 July (2:10 pm) | North Melbourne | **20.13 (133)** | 14.12 (96) | Won by 37 points | Waverley Park (H) | 17,096 | 10–7 |
| 19 | Saturday, 25 July (2:10 pm) | St Kilda | **7.13 (55)** | 19.16 (130) | Lost by 75 points | Waverley Park (H) | 43,132 | 10–8 |
| 20 | Saturday, 1 August (2:10 pm) | Essendon | 8.8 (56) | **32.24 (216)** | Won by 160 points | Melbourne Cricket Ground (A) | 41,070 | 11–8 |
| 21 | Saturday, 8 August (2:10 pm) | Collingwood | **11.16 (82)** | 8.15 (63) | Won by 19 points | Waverley Park (H) | 53,369 | 12–8 |
| 22 | Saturday, 15 August (2:10 pm) | Richmond | 13.8 (86) | **25.20 (170)** | Won by 84 points | Melbourne Cricket Ground (A) | 20,423 | 13–8 |
| 23 | Bye | | | | | | | |
| 24 | Saturday, 29 August (2:10 pm) | Melbourne | 20.10 (130) | **22.17 (149)** | Won by 19 points | Melbourne Cricket Ground (A) | 42,549 | 14–8 |

=== Finals series ===
| Rd | Date and local time | Opponent | Scores (Hawthorn's scores indicated in bold) | | | Venue | Attendance |
| Rd | Date and local time | Opponent | Home | Away | Result | Venue | Attendance |
|---|---|---|---|---|---|---|---|
| 1st Elimination Final | Sunday, 6 September (2:30 pm) | West Coast | 14.16 (100) | **12.15 (87)** | Lost by 13 points | Subiaco Oval (A) | 40,237 |

== Ladder ==
| (P) | Premiers |
| | Qualified for finals |

| # | Team | P | W | L | D | PF | PA | % | Pts |
|---|---|---|---|---|---|---|---|---|---|
| 1 | Geelong | 22 | 16 | 6 | 0 | 3057 | 2099 | 145.6 | 64 |
| 2 | Footscray | 22 | 16 | 6 | 0 | 2384 | 1836 | 129.8 | 64 |
| 3 | Collingwood | 22 | 16 | 6 | 0 | 2195 | 1911 | 114.9 | 64 |
| 4 | West Coast (P) | 22 | 15 | 6 | 1 | 2206 | 1752 | 125.9 | 62 |
| 5 | Hawthorn | 22 | 14 | 8 | 0 | 2579 | 2098 | 122.9 | 56 |
| 6 | St Kilda | 22 | 14 | 8 | 0 | 2415 | 2009 | 120.2 | 56 |
| 7 | Carlton | 22 | 14 | 8 | 0 | 2362 | 2103 | 112.3 | 56 |
| 8 | Essendon | 22 | 12 | 10 | 0 | 2241 | 2414 | 92.8 | 48 |
| 9 | Adelaide | 22 | 11 | 11 | 0 | 2317 | 2286 | 101.4 | 44 |
| 10 | Fitzroy | 22 | 9 | 13 | 0 | 2166 | 2398 | 90.3 | 36 |
| 11 | Melbourne | 22 | 7 | 14 | 1 | 2083 | 2386 | 87.3 | 30 |
| 12 | North Melbourne | 22 | 7 | 15 | 0 | 2269 | 2535 | 89.5 | 28 |
| 13 | Richmond | 22 | 5 | 17 | 0 | 2160 | 2938 | 73.5 | 20 |
| 14 | Brisbane Bears | 22 | 4 | 17 | 1 | 1770 | 2742 | 64.6 | 18 |
| 15 | Sydney | 22 | 3 | 18 | 1 | 1997 | 2694 | 74.1 | 14 |

Rules for classification: 1. premiership points; 2. percentage; 3. points for
Average score: 103.6
Source: AFL Tables
