= 1985 Hawthorn Football Club season =

61st season in the Victorian Football League

Hawthorn Football Club
1985 season
- President: Ron Cook
- Coach: Allan Jeans
- Captain: Leigh Matthews
- Home ground: Princes Park
- VFL season: 15–6–1 (3rd)
- Finals series: Grand Final (Defeated by Essendon 92–170)
- Best and Fairest: Dermott Brereton
- Leading goalkicker: Dermott Brereton (58)
- Highest home attendance: 55,246 (Preliminary final vs. Footscray)
- Lowest home attendance: 8,694 (Round 15 vs. Sydney)
- Average home attendance: 21,813

The 1985 season was the Hawthorn Football Club's 61st season in the Victorian Football League and 84th overall.

== Fixture ==
=== Premiership season ===
Rd	Date and local time	Opponent	Scores (Hawthorn's scores indicated in bold)			Venue	Attendance	Record
Rd	Date and local time	Opponent	Home	Away	Result	Venue	Attendance	Record
1	Saturday, 30 March (2:10 pm)	Geelong	20.8 (128)	**14.16 (100)**	Lost by 28 points	VFL Park (A)	20,776	0–1
2	Monday, 8 April (2:10 pm)	Melbourne	**25.20 (170)**	14.18 (102)	Won by 68 points	Princes Park (H)	17,359	1–1
3	Saturday, 23 March (2:10 pm)	Essendon	17.12 (114)	**15.10 (100)**	Lost by 14 points	VFL Park (A)	41,694	1–2
4	Sunday, 21 April (2:10 pm)	Sydney	5.14 (44)	**8.15 (63)**	Won by 19 points	Sydney Cricket Ground (A)	7,860	2–2
5	Saturday, 27 April (2:10 pm)	Richmond	**21.23 (149)**	29.14 (188)	Lost by 39 points	Princes Park (H)	17,257	2–3
6	Saturday, 4 May (2:10 pm)	Fitzroy	15.12 (102)	**19.16 (130)**	Won by 28 points	Victoria Park (A)	9,894	3–3
7	Saturday, 11 May (2:10 pm)	St Kilda	**28.15 (183)**	8.9 (57)	Won by 126 points	Princes Park (H)	9,762	4–3
8	Saturday, 18 May (2:10 pm)	Collingwood	8.9 (57)	**6.10 (46)**	Lost by 11 points	Victoria Park (A)	20,631	4–4
9	Saturday, 25 May (2:10 pm)	Footscray	**17.24 (126)**	16.11 (107)	Won by 19 points	Princes Park (H)	16,687	5–4
10	Saturday, 1 June (2:10 pm)	Carlton	9.14 (68)	**22.15 (147)**	Won by 79 points	Princes Park (A)	25,394	6–4
11	Monday, 10 June (2:10 pm)	North Melbourne	17.11 (113)	**17.11 (113)**	Draw	Melbourne Cricket Ground (A)	39,084	6–4–1
12	Saturday, 15 June (2:10 pm)	Geelong	**17.15 (117)**	13.10 (88)	Won by 29 points	Princes Park (H)	11,393	7–4–1
13	Saturday, 22 June (2:10 pm)	Melbourne	12.9 (81)	**11.31 (97)**	Won by 16 points	Melbourne Cricket Ground (A)	16,406	8–4–1
14	Saturday, 29 June (2:10 pm)	Essendon	**15.11 (101)**	21.11 (137)	Lost by 36 points	VFL Park (H)	48,880	8–5–1
15	Saturday, 6 July (2:10 pm)	Sydney	**23.18 (156)**	12.11 (83)	Won by 73 points	Princes Park (H)	8,694	9–5–1
16	Saturday, 13 July (2:10 pm)	Richmond	17.11 (113)	**27.18 (180)**	Won by 67 points	Melbourne Cricket Ground (A)	23,522	10–5–1
17	Saturday, 27 July (2:10 pm)	Fitzroy	**19.20 (134)**	8.14 (62)	Won by 72 points	VFL Park (H)	13,197	11–5–1
18	Saturday, 3 August (2:10 pm)	St Kilda	13.16 (94)	**20.15 (135)**	Won by 41 points	Moorabbin Oval (A)	10,911	12–5–1
19	Saturday, 10 August (2:10 pm)	Collingwood	**15.6 (96)**	8.16 (64)	Won by 32 points	Princes Park (H)	15,822	13–5–1
20	Saturday, 17 August (2:10 pm)	Footscray	5.13 (43)	**5.8 (38)**	Lost by 5 points	Western Oval (A)	21,828	13–6–1
21	Saturday, 24 August (2:10 pm)	Carlton	**15.17 (107)**	12.12 (84)	Won by 23 points	Princes Park (H)	31,062	14–6–1
22	Saturday, 31 August (2:10 pm)	North Melbourne	**23.21 (159)**	14.11 (95)	Won by 64 points	Princes Park (H)	16,398	15–6–1

=== Finals series ===
Rd	Date and local time	Opponent	Scores (Hawthorn's scores indicated in bold)			Venue	Attendance
Rd	Date and local time	Opponent	Home	Away	Result	Venue	Attendance
Qualifying final	Sunday, 8 September (2:30 pm)	Footscray	8.14 (62)	**22.23 (155)**	Won by 93 points	Melbourne Cricket Ground (A)	58,367
2nd semi-final	Saturday, 14 September (2:30 pm)	Essendon	14.18 (102)	**9.8 (62)**	Lost by 40 points	VFL Park (A)	67,063
Preliminary final	Saturday, 21 September (2:30 pm)	Footscray	**16.13 (109)**	15.9 (99)	Won by 10 points	VFL Park (H)	55,246
Grand Final	Saturday, 28 September (2:50 pm)	Essendon	26.14 (170)	**14.8 (92)**	Lost by 78 points	Melbourne Cricket Ground (A)	100,042

== Ladder ==
(P)	Premiers
	Qualified for finals

#	Team	P	W	L	D	PF	PA	%	Pts
1	Essendon (P)	22	19	3	0	2755	1991	138.4	76
2	Footscray	22	16	6	0	2417	2000	120.9	64
3	Hawthorn	22	15	6	1	2647	2024	130.8	62
4	Carlton	22	15	7	0	2430	2104	115.5	60
5	North Melbourne	22	13	8	1	2379	2431	97.9	54
6	Geelong	22	12	10	0	2277	2263	100.6	48
7	Collingwood	22	10	12	0	2197	2180	100.8	40
8	Richmond	22	9	13	0	2362	2590	91.2	36
9	Fitzroy	22	7	15	0	2301	2452	93.8	28
10	Sydney	22	6	16	0	2219	2349	94.5	24
11	Melbourne	22	6	16	0	1965	2527	77.8	24
12	St Kilda	22	3	19	0	1899	2937	64.7	12

Rules for classification: 1. premiership points; 2. percentage; 3. points for
Average score: 105.5
Source: AFL Tables
