= Clarrie Lethlean =

Australian rules footballer

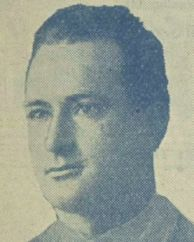

Personal information
- Full name: Clarence Lloyd Lethlean
- Born: 12 July 1900; Port Melbourne, Victoria
- Died: 18 July 1969 (aged 69); Melbourne, Victoria
- Original team: Oakleigh
- Height: 182 cm (6 ft 0 in)
- Weight: 84 kg (185 lb)

Playing career^{1}
Years	Club	Games (Goals)
1921	Melbourne	9 (0)
1922–1924	Hawthorn (VFA)	35 (33)
1925–1927	Hawthorn	43 (18)
Total		87 (51)
- ^{1} Playing statistics correct to the end of 1927.

Career highlights
- Hawthorn captain: 1927

Clarence Lloyd "Clarrie" Lethlean (12 July 1900 – 18 July 1969) was an Australian rules footballer who played with Melbourne and Hawthorn in the Victorian Football League (VFL).

== Family ==
The sixth of eight children born to Alexander Lethlean (1868–1943) and Emily Lethlean (1869–1943), nee Prisk, Clarence Lloyd Lethlean was born at Port Melbourne on 12 July 1900.

Clarrie Lethlean married Elva Margaret Roemus in 1925 and they had three sons together.

== Football ==
Lethlean, who started his career at Oakleigh, made nine appearances for Melbourne in the 1921 VFL season. He switched clubs during the 1922 season, joining Hawthorn in the Victorian Football Association. In 1925 he made a return to the VFL, with Hawthorn entering the competition. An in-and-out 1925 season as a forward turned around when Lethlean was placed in defence and used as a relief follower. His bulk, guile and tenacity made him well suited to the role, and he became a key contributor over the next few seasons. Lethlean was elected captain of the side in 1927, where he gave good service as a ruckman during an injury crisis, despite missing four games through suspension. The 1927 VFL season was his final year at Hawthorn.

== Later life ==
In 1928 Lethlean and his family moved to Perenjori, Western Australia to become farmers, but returned to Victoria about five years later after his brother's death.

Lethlean worked as a public servant after his return to Victoria and was living in East Malvern at the time of his death in 1969.

He was cremated at Springvale Botanical Cemetery on 22 July 1969.

== Honours and achievements ==
Individual

- Hawthorn captain: 1927
