= Bert Sutton =

Australian rules footballer, born 1901

Personal information
- Full name: Herbert Carey Tregurtha Sutton
- Born: 15 April 1901; Williamstown, Victoria
- Died: 17 August 1981 (aged 80); Concord, New South Wales
- Original team: Williamstown (VFA)
- Height: 173 cm (5 ft 8 in)
- Weight: 66 kg (146 lb)

Playing career^{1}
Years	Club	Games (Goals)
1919–1920	Williamstown (VFA)	34 (9)
1921–1924	South Melbourne	19 (2)
1925	North Launceston (NTFA)	
1926–1927	South Melbourne	30 (32)
1928	Hawthorn	15 (3)

Coaching career
Years	Club	Games (W–L–D)
1924	St Patricks O&MFL	14 (11–3–0)
1925	North Launceston (NTFA)	12 (7–4–1)
1928	Hawthorn	18 (0–18–0)
- ^{1} Playing statistics correct to the end of 1928.

Herbert Carey Tregurtha 'Bert' Sutton (15 April 1901 – 17 August 1981) was an Australian rules footballer who played with South Melbourne and Hawthorn in the Victorian Football League (VFL) during the 1920s.

== Family ==
The son of Thomas Henry Baldock Sutton (1865–1934) and Alice Melita Sutton, née Tregurtha (1869–1950), Herbert Carey Tregurtha Sutton was born at Williamstown on 15 April 1901.

Sutton married Mary Christina Evans (1900–1979) on 29 June 1929 at Wesley Church in Melbourne. They subsequently moved to Adelaide, where they had a son, Evan Carey Sutton (1932-2006), and then moved to Sydney where they settled in the suburb of Concord.

== Football ==
Sutton, who came to South Melbourne from Williamstown, was used mostly as a flanker.

He left South Melbourne in 1924 to captain-coach St Patrick's in the Ovens & Murray Football League to the premiership.

In 1925 he moved on to captain-coach North Launceston for a season and also steered them to a premiership.

After another stint at South Melbourne (1926 to 1927), Sutton crossed to Hawthorn in 1928 as captain-coach. The club failed to win a game all year, and he was not retained for the 1929 season.

== Umpire ==
Sutton was later an umpire in the Victorian Junior Football League.

== War service ==
Sutton served in the Volunteer Defence Corps during World War II.

== Death ==
Bert Sutton died in Concord, New South Wales on 17 August 1981 and was cremated at Rookwood Cemetery.
