= Norm Hillard =

Australian rules footballer (1915–1986)

Personal information
- Full name: Norman Thomas Frederick Hillard
- Born: 3 June 1915; Richmond, Victoria
- Died: 24 April 1986 (aged 70); Kew, Victoria
- Original team: Kew
- Height: 180 cm (5 ft 11 in)
- Weight: 81 kg (179 lb)

Playing career^{1}
Years	Club	Games (Goals)
1933, 1936–37	Hawthorn	32 (57)
1939–1946	Fitzroy	94 (12)
Total		126 (69)

Coaching career
Years	Club	Games (W–L–D)
1945	Fitzroy	1 (1–0–0)
- ^{1} Playing statistics correct to the end of 1946.

Norman Thomas Frederick Hillard (3 June 1915 – 24 April 1986) was an Australian rules footballer who played with Hawthorn and Fitzroy in the Victorian Football League (VFL).

Hillard played in the forward line during his time at Hawthorn, kicking a career best 31 goals in the 1937 season. During his time at Fitzroy however, he was used in defence and was the club's centre half back in their 1944 premiership. He was awarded the best player in the 1944 premiership.

He later became coach of the Fitzroy Football Club 2nds team and was Chairman of Selectors for over two decades and also a longtime vice president of the club.
