= Geoff Angus =

Australian rules footballer

Personal information
- Born: 19 August 1948 (age 78)
- Original team: Carey Grammar
- Height: 174 cm (5 ft 9 in)
- Weight: 73 kg (161 lb)

Playing career^{1}
Years	Club	Games (Goals)
1967–1973	Hawthorn	73 (35)
- ^{1} Playing statistics correct to the end of 1973.

Career highlights
- VFL premiership player: 1971

Geoff Angus (born 19 August 1948) is a former Australian rules footballer who played with Hawthorn in the VFL.

Angus played as a centreman during his career and made his debut for Hawthorn in 1967. He was a member of their 1971 premiership side.
