= Michael Zemski =

Australian rules footballer

Personal information
- Full name: Michael Henry Zemski
- Born: 10 August 1953 (age 73)
- Original team: Camberwell Grammar
- Height: 177 cm (5 ft 10 in)
- Weight: 76 kg (168 lb)

Playing career^{1}
Years	Club	Games (Goals)
1973–74	Hawthorn	8 (1)
1975–76	Preston (VFA)	23 (22)
1977–78	Prahran (VFA)	9 (8)
- ^{1} Playing statistics correct to the end of 1978.

Michael Henry Zemski (born 10 August 1953) is a former Australian rules footballer who played with Hawthorn in the Victorian Football League (VFL) and Preston and Prahran in the Victorian Football Association (VFA).

Zemski later played with and briefly coached AJAX Football Club in the Victorian Amateur Football Association. He is also a former leading athlete who represented Australia at the Maccabiah Games.

== Sources ==
- Atkinson, G. (1982) Everything you ever wanted to know about Australian rules football but couldn't be bothered asking, The Five Mile Press: Melbourne. ISBN 0 86788 009 0.
- Holmesby, Russell & Main, Jim (2007). The Encyclopedia of AFL Footballers. 7th ed. Melbourne: Bas Publishing.
