= Noel Voigt =

Australian rules footballer

Personal information
- Full name: Noel Voigt
- Born: 15 December 1935
- Original team: Carey Grammar
- Height: 191 cm (6 ft 3 in)
- Weight: 86 kg (190 lb)
- Position: Defence / Follower

Playing career^{1}
Years	Club	Games (Goals)
1954–60	Hawthorn	84 (45)
- ^{1} Playing statistics correct to the end of 1960.

Noel Voigt (born 15 December 1935) is a former Australian rules footballer who played with Hawthorn in the Victorian Football League (VFL).
