= Hawthorn Football Club =

Australian rules football club

Names
- Full name: Hawthorn Football Club Limited
- Nickname(s): Hawks, The Family Club
- Motto: Spectemur Agendo (Let us be judged by our acts.)

2026 season
- After finals: 4th
- Home-and-away season: 4th
- Leading goalkicker: Jack Gunston (66 goals)
- Peter Crimmins Medal: Nick Watson

Club details
- Founded: April 1902; 124 years ago
- Colours: Brown Gold
- Competition: AFL: Senior men AFLW: Senior women VBFL: Blind (mixed); VWFL: Wheelchair (mixed); CWFL: Wheelchair (mixed)
- President: Andrew Gowers
- CEO: Ash Klein
- Coach: Sam Mitchell
- Captain(s): Jai Newcombe; James Sicily
- Premierships: VFL/AFL (13): 1961; 1971; 1976; 1978; 1983; 1986; 1988; 1989; 1991; 2008; 2013; 2014; 2015; Reserves (4): 1958; 1959; 1972; 1985; VFLW (1): 2018; Championship of Australia (1): 1971
- Grounds: Melbourne Cricket Ground (capacity: 100,024 (Note: Including standing room))
- University of Tasmania Stadium (capacity: 19,000)
- Former grounds: Glenferrie Oval (1906–1973)
- Princes Park (1974–1991)
- Waverley Park (1990–1999)
- Training ground: Kennedy Community Centre

Uniforms
Home	Away	Heritage

Other information
- Official website: hawthornfc.com.au

The Hawthorn Football Club, nicknamed the Hawks, is a professional Australian rules football club based in the Melbourne suburb of Dingley Village that competes in the Australian Football League (AFL). The club was founded in 1902 in the inner-east suburb of Hawthorn, making it the youngest Victorian-based team in the AFL.

The Hawks are the only club to have won the VFL/AFL competition in every decade between 1960 and 2020, totalling 13 premierships. The team play in their traditional vertically striped brown-and-gold guernseys for Home fixtures, but may use different designs for special rounds such as Sir Doug Nicholls Round. For Away fixtures, the team alternates between guernseys that are either predominantly gold, white or brown.

The club's Latin motto is Spectemur agendo ("Let us be judged by our acts)". The Hawks are known for their strong competitive rivalry with certain AFL teams, most notably the Geelong and Essendon football clubs.

Upon inception and until 1973, the Hawks played home matches at Glenferrie Oval in Hawthorn; they subsequently shifted home matches to Princes Park in 1974, and to Waverley Park in 1991. Later, the Melbourne Cricket Ground (MCG) became their home ground when Waverley was redeveloped. The club moved its training and administration facilities from Glenferrie to Waverley Park in 2006, which is located in an area of the club's major supporter base in Melbourne's outer-eastern region. In 2025, Hawthorn once again moved its headquarters and training facilities, settling in the purpose-built Kennedy Community Centre in Dingley Village. Since 2007, Hawthorn have played four games a year at their secondary home ground of York Park in Launceston, Tasmania, an as part of an agreement struck with the Tasmanian government which will end in 2027. Most of the remaining home games are played at the MCG and one usually played at Marvel Stadium.

Hawthorn fields a women's team in the AFLW competition. The AFLW team played their first game on 27 August 2022 at Marvel Stadium.

== History ==
=== Origins ===
The official club history books and many supporters strongly believe that the club's origins date back to its founding in 1873 at a meeting at the Hawthorne Hotel. Although a Hawthorn Football Club did indeed form at this time—and the region has since continuously been represented by a football team—it was not the Hawthorn which competes at AFL level today. It is likely that today's club is actually the third club to carry the name "Hawthorn Football Club". On 12 May 1883, The Age reported that "the Hawthorn club has disbanded and all engagements for the ensuing season are therefore cancelled".

In 1889, the Riversdale Football Club (formed in 1880) is reported to have changed its name to the Hawthorn Football Club. This club also ceased in 1890. No Hawthorn club existed from 1890 to 1892. A new representative club, also called the "Hawthorn Football Club", was formed in 1893. It competed in the Victorian Junior Football Association (VJFA) until 1898. Without a ground to play on, however, the club was disbanded in 1899.

=== Modern club founded ===
In April 1902, Alf Kosky formed a club from the various district clubs under the banner of Hawthorn Football Club to compete in the Metropolitan Junior Football Association (MJFA). Hawthorn's first win was in round 4, 1902, with an 18-point victory over Celtic. The club finished sixth on the ladder at the end of the 1902 season with six wins from its 16 games. On 30 March 1905, prior to the start of that year's MJFA season, Hawthorn merged with the Boroondara Football Club and adopted Boroondara's colours of a black guernsey with a red sash, but retained the "Hawthorn" name.

Hawthorn changed its official name to the Hawthorn City Football Club in 1906 as a result of Glenferrie Oval opening, although the club continued to be known simply as Hawthorn. In 1912, the club merged with the Hawthorn Rovers, a successful junior club, changing to a gold guernsey with a blue "V" of the Rovers, and again renaming officially to "Hawthorn City". The council then applied to the Victorian Football Association (VFA) for inclusion, which was granted in 1914 when Hawthorn replaced the disbanded Melbourne City Football Club.

=== VFA years: 1914–1924 ===
The first task for the club was to decide on club colours; their jumper of blue and gold was already taken by Williamstown, so a change was required. At a Special General Meeting held on 17 February 1914, a Mr J. Brain proposed brown and gold as the new colours, and the motion was carried. The Mayblooms won three games and had one draw in their first season in the VFA. The consequences of players enlisting in World War I caused the club to finish last in 1915. The VFA then went into recess in 1916 and 1917, and Hawthorn did not compete when resumption occurred in 1918. Upon Hawthorn's resumption in 1919, it was more competitive, winning eight games and finishing sixth out of ten teams. Hawthorn dropped to eighth in 1920, but in 1921 they won seven games and finished sixth.

Bill Walton was appointed captain-coach of Hawthorn in 1922. He was, however, refused a clearance by Port Melbourne; and, as a result, spent the season playing for Port Melbourne while coaching Hawthorn during the week. Twice that season, he had the unusual situation of playing a VFA game against the club that he coached. In one of those matches, a Port Melbourne teammate had to be restrained from striking Walton over Walton's vocal support for the player's opponent. In 1922, the club missed the finals by percentage and Hawthorn set a new record score in the VFA, scoring 30.31.211 to Prahran 6.9.45. In 1923, Walton was granted his clearance, and the club made the finals by finishing in fourth place, losing to Port Melbourne in the first semi-final. 1924, the club finished fifth, missing the finals by four points.

=== Entry to the VFL ===
Since 1919, the VFL had nine clubs which caused one team to be idle every Saturday. The VFL was keen to do away with this bye via the admission of a tenth club. In 1924, a group calling itself the Hawthorn Citizens' League Campaign Committee began gathering support for the football club's admittance to the VFL. Other representations came from Brighton, Brunswick, Footscray, North Melbourne, Prahran, Camberwell, and Caulfield.

On 9 January 1925, a committee meeting of the VFL, chaired by Reg Hunt of Carlton, examined the question of expanding the competition from nine clubs to twelve: and at a full meeting on 16 January 1925, the VFL decided to admit the three Victorian Football Association (VFA) clubs: Hawthorn, Footscray and North Melbourne.

=== Bumbling along the bottom: 1925–1949 ===
The Mayblooms, as they were then known, became the perennial whipping boys of the competition. Hawthorn had an almost casual attitude towards playing football and—lying remote from major industrial areas and consequently devoid of the business or political patrons available to Carlton, Richmond and Collingwood—were not able to even pay their players the match payment then allowed by the Coulter Law. Despite the presence of a number of players of true class — such as Bert Hyde, Bert Mills, Stan Spinks, Alec Albiston, and Col Austen — Hawthorn never won more than seven games in a season in its first seventeen years in the League.

Roy Cazaly was the non-playing coach of Hawthorn in 1942; he was reported to have given the club its nickname the "Hawks" on the suggestion of one of his daughters. Cazaly thought that it was tougher than their original nickname the "Mayblooms", and 1943 turned out to be the club's best season since joining the VFL, in which the club missed the finals only by percentage. However, Hawthorn immediately returned to the bottom of the ladder, consistently competing with St Kilda for the wooden spoon. Between 1944 and 1953, the club finished last or second-last in every year but one. Half-back flanker Col Austen tied with South Melbourne's Ron Clegg for the 1949 Brownlow Medal but was not awarded it based on the "countback" system in place at that time. The League later changed the system for tied results, and, in 1989, he was awarded the medal retrospectively, a year before his death.

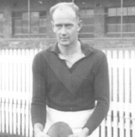
Captain coach 1947–1949, Albiston was one of the characters of the club's most bitter internal fight

=== 1950s ===
1950 started with the club in turmoil. The club appointed Bob McCaskill as coach, and he wanted Kevin Curran to be captain. Outgoing captain-coach Alec Albiston was angry as he was told by a member of the board that he would remain as captain. Brownlow Medallist Col Austen sided with Albiston and a split occurred. The board sided with the new coach and gave Albiston and Austen open clearances. Without the club's best two players, the team did not win a match in 1950. New captain Kevin Curran was suspended for striking Austen on the first occasion Hawthorn and Austen's new club Richmond played.

The club decided to change its playing jumper to the brown and gold vertical stripes. Two positives were the arrival of John Kennedy and Roy Simmonds. Over the next ten years, Kennedy would play 169 games for Hawthorn, serving as captain from 1955 until his retirement in 1959, and winning the club's Best and Fairest award four times (in 1950, 51, 52 and 54). Simmonds would play 192 games and win the club's Best and Fairest award in 1955.

In 1952, Jack Hale took over as coach, Hale had been Bob McCaskill's assistant, but McCaskill's health was failing and he died in June 1952. Aided by dividends from the VFL's finals revenue making the club more competitive financially — despite no Hawthorn team in any grade playing VFL finals to that point — this proved the decisive step in the movement of Hawthorn away from the bottom of the ladder. He eliminated the casual attitude that prevailed at the club during its first thirty years in the VFL and made the club less accepting of defeat than before. Although Hawthorn finished last in 1953, from the following year improvement was steady.

Hawthorn had their first recruitment coup in 1954 by signing Clayton "Candles" Thompson from South Australia. Thompson was the glamour player from the 1953 National Football Championships, kicking ten goals against Western Australia. Fresh from school, teenagers John Peck, Allan Woodley, Noel Voigt and Brian Kann started at Hawthorn and the club won eight games. Gifted schoolboy from Sandhurst, Graham Arthur, arrived in 1955 and became the second player to win the club's Best and Fairest in his first year, the other being John Kennedy. Brendan Edwards followed Arthur to Hawthorn in 1956 and, although the seniors showed a slight decline to seven wins and a draw, the reserve grade side gave Hawthorn a first finals appearance in any grade.

==== First finals appearance ====
In 1957 the senior team broke through for their first finals appearance, defeating Carlton in the first semi-final long remembered for the freak hailstorm after half time. It was a surreal look of the MCG covered in golfball-size hailstones. They were outclassed by Melbourne in the preliminary final.

=== Kennedy era: 1960–1982 ===
It was a great thing for people who had followed the club through all the bad years. Until then, before and through the match, I had been absorbed with the conviction that we were fighting for something that was our right, to be up there with the best of them.

— John Kennedy Sr., Hawthorn's inaugural premiership coach, talking about his win following the 1961 Grand Final

==== Winning premierships ====
1961 VFL Grand Final	G	B	Total
Hawthorn	13	16	94
Footscray	7	9	51
Venue: Melbourne Cricket Ground	Crowd: 107,935

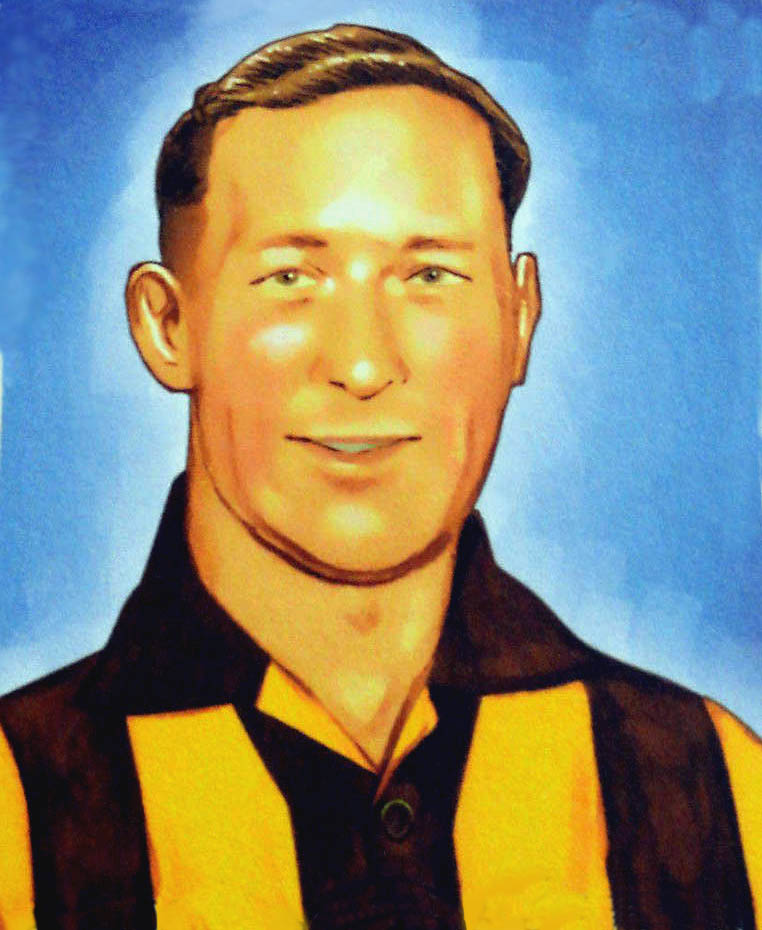
John Kennedy Sr. is the Hawks' first premiership coach. Hawthorn honoured him with a bronze statue in front of Waverley Park

After three seasons in mid-ladder Hawthorn appointed John Kennedy as coach in 1960. Kennedy and 1960 Club Champion Brendan Edwards believed that footballers were not fit enough so a training regime was implemented. John Winneke, Phil Hay, Malcolm Hill, Morton Browne, Ian Mort and Ian Law made their debuts in 1960. Kennedy took the Hawks further than ever before in 1961, winning their first premiership by defeating Footscray. Brendan Edwards was acknowledged as the best player for the Grand Final.

However, Hawthorn fell back in 1962, winning only five games and finishing in ninth position on the ladder as the club's modest support base and lack of wealthy supporters limited its ability to compete for the growing number of country recruits joining the VFL. In 1963 the club finished on top of the ladder only to lose the grand final to Geelong by 49 points. Kennedy accepted a position as Principal of Stawell High School so Graham Arthur became captain-coach in 1964. The Hawks lost the penultimate game to Melbourne and dropped to fifth – had they won they would have finished on top of the ladder. They fell to last in 1965 with only four wins, and rebuilt the team for the rest of the 1960s. 1966 saw the debut of Peter Crimmins, Des Meagher, Michael Porter and Ray Wilson.

John Kennedy returned to coach in 1967. Don Scott, Ian Bremner and Geoff Angus were local recruits. The club convinced Peter Hudson to join them in 1967 and he immediately became the competition's leading full-forward. In 1968 he kicked 125 goals, the first centurion since John Coleman, and again in 1969 kicked 120 goals. Despite this, Hawthorn still failed to make the finals, but the acquisition of the powerful Mornington Peninsula recruiting zone gave the club a huge boost in its quest for success and permitted the club a much more powerful list than ever before. In 1968, Kevin Heath and Norm Bussell become members of the senior team and in 1969 two teenagers, Peter Knights and Leigh Matthews, were recruited.

Hawthorn started the 1970s missing the finals even though Peter Hudson kicked a home-and-away record of 146 goals in 1970. The team's spine was strengthened with the arrival of full back Kelvin Moore and centre half-forward Alan Martello.

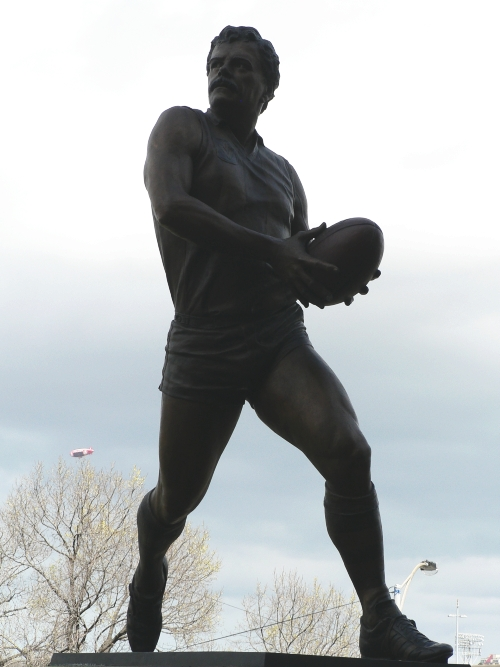
Statue of former Hawthorn player, Leigh Matthews, at the Melbourne Cricket Ground.

In 1971 the Hawks finished on top of the ladder, the first time since 1963, Peter Hudson equalled Bob Pratt's record of 150 goals in a season and Leigh Matthews won the first of eight club championships. Matthews gained notoriety by shirt fronting Barry Cable in an interstate game in Perth.

1971 VFL Grand Final	G	B	Total
Hawthorn	12	10	82
St Kilda	11	9	75
Venue: Melbourne Cricket Ground	Crowd: 118,192

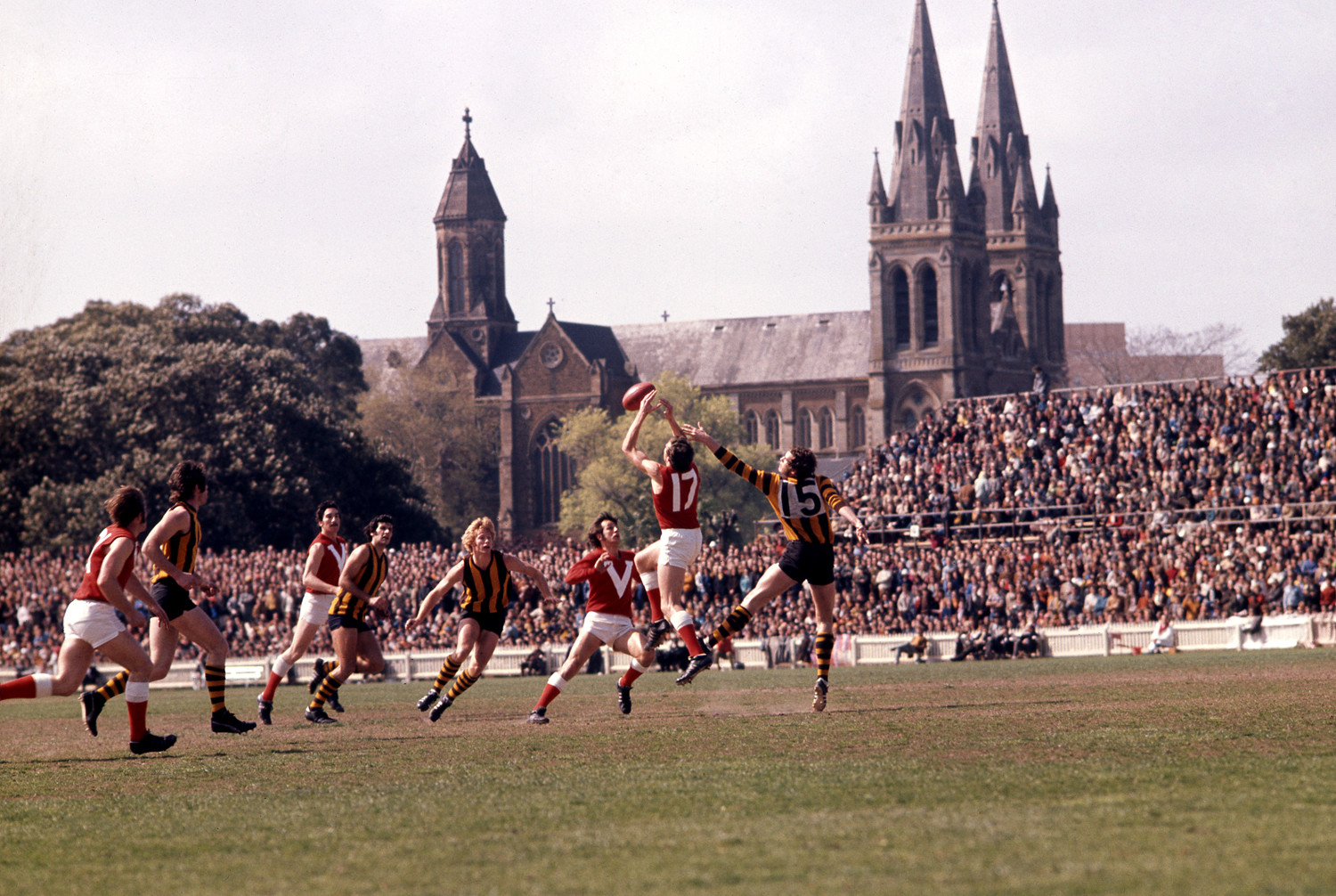
Hawthorn playing North Adelaide in the 1971 Championship of Australia final.

The 1971 Grand Final was between Hawthorn coached by Hawthorn legend John Kennedy and St Kilda coached by Allan Jeans (who would later move to Hawthorn and enjoy success as the Hawks coach in the 1980s). The match was played before 118,192 people at the MCG on a cool and wet Melbourne day. Hawthorn went into the match without inspirational centre half-back Peter Knights who had suffered a severe knee injury two weeks earlier. It was a hard and tough game played out with the Saints leading the Hawks by 20 points going into the last quarter. Hawks 5.7 (37) to the Saints 8.9 (57). For the Saints, however, as coach Allan Jeans was to comment, "The season was just 25 minutes too long". "Kennedy's Commandos" (the term given to the team after the coach's tough physical training program and loudly proclaimed in the huge banners that swept around the MCG (now sadly replaced by advertising signs)) came into force. The Hawks moved Peter Hudson out to centre half-forward and Bob Keddie into the goal square. The Hawks slammed on seven goals to three in the final quarter, with Keddie kicking four, to run out winners (12.10.82) to the Saints (11.9.75). The final term saw ten goals being scored.

A skinny lad from Berwick made his debut in 1972. Michael Tuck played the first of a club record 426 games after Hawthorn lost champion full forward Peter Hudson to a knee injury in the first game of the year. Hudson had kicked 8 goals before being injured before half time. John Hendrie whose grandfather played in Hawthorn's first VFL game and played the first 197 games for the club.

1976 VFL Grand Final	G	B	Total
Hawthorn	13	22	100
North Melbourne	10	10	70
Venue: Melbourne Cricket Ground	Crowd: 110,143

During the 1970s a strong rivalry grew with North Melbourne and they met in three grand finals with the Hawks prevailing twice. The 1976 Grand Final team was inspired by the illness of former captain Peter Crimmins who died 3 days after the victory from cancer, and by the humiliating defeat of the 1975 Grand Final loss to the North Melbourne Kangaroos. The Hawks greats such as the prolific goal-kicker Michael Moncrieff, rover Leigh Matthews, ruck rover Michael Tuck, ruckman Don Scott, full back Kelvin Moore and centre half-back Peter Knights played through this era. The Hawthorn North Melbourne clash was a close encounter, but injuries to champions such as Keith Greig and Brent Crosswell made North's chances of winning difficult. However, when Hawthorn looked threatened, they replied quickly and kept their lead intact. The forward line won the day and as a result, it was not surprising that John Hendrie was voted best on ground by radio and newspapers of the day. Hendrie had kicked two goals and eight behinds for the day.

1978 VFL Grand Final	G	B	Total
Hawthorn	18	13	121
North Melbourne	15	13	103
Venue: Melbourne Cricket Ground	Crowd: 101,704

After the disappointment of losing to North Melbourne in the 1977 Preliminary Final, the Hawks were back to play in the 1978 Grand Final, again against North Melbourne. It was the third time in four seasons that these two sides were to meet in a grand final. North Melbourne were competing in their fifth successive grand final and were the reigning premiers. At half time North Melbourne led by four points but Hawthorn finished victors by three goals thanks largely to a strong third quarter which saw them kick 7.6. The turning point occurred when two North players spoiled each other in the goal square at the 6-minute mark, when a mark and a goal could have put them 17 points up. The Hawks went on to dominate play after this incident and never looked back.

=== Glory years: 1983–1991 ===
==== Seven straight: 1983–1989 ====
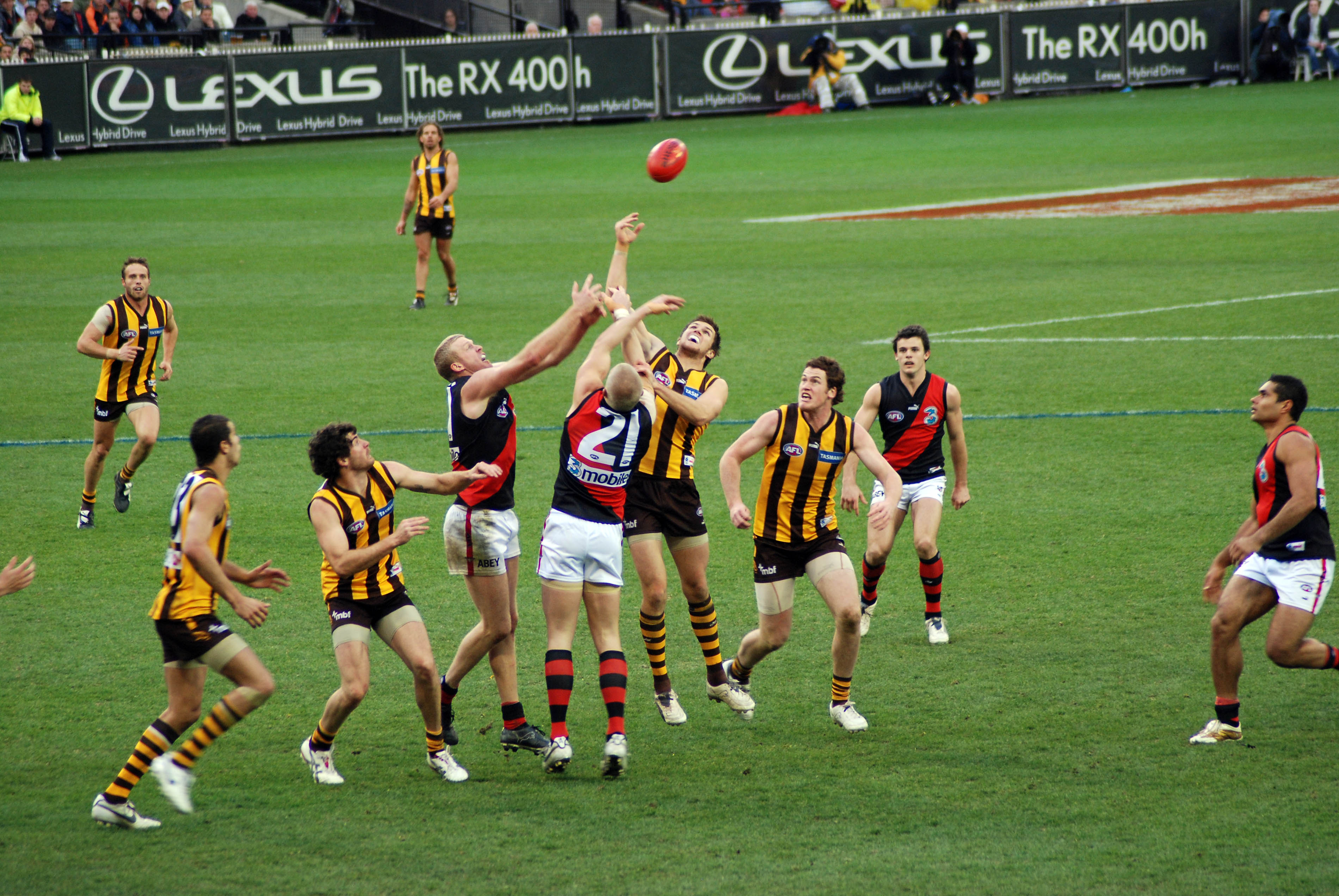
The bitter Hawthorn-Essendon rivalry started in the 1980s, when the two clubs met in three successive grand finals (2007)

Their greatest era was arguably the 1980s, when the team won four premierships and played in the grand final seven years in succession, including three in a row against arch-enemy Essendon. The decade started poorly, with Hawthorn failing to finish in the top five (as it was then known) and seen by most critics as a spent force. Coach David Parkin left and agreed to coach Carlton and captain Don Scott would shortly retire after playing his 300th game. In a surprise appointment, Hawthorn persuaded former St Kilda premiership coach Allan Jeans to coach the team. Jeans had not coached in the VFL for five years.

1982 would mark the start of Hawthorn playing finals for 13 consecutive seasons. In 1982, Hawthorn finished second after the home and away season, fans saw Subiaco champion Gary Buckenara for the first time and also a cameo appearance of Gary Ablett in a Hawthorn jumper, Dermott Brereton, who was a skinny kid from Frankston, made his debut in the semi-final against North Melbourne and kicked five goals. Hawthorn lost the Preliminary Final to Carlton by 31 points.

1983 VFL Grand Final	G	B	Total
Hawthorn	20	20	140
Essendon	8	9	57
Venue: Melbourne Cricket Ground	Crowd: 110,332

The first of four premierships for the decade was in the 1983 Grand Final, with Hawthorn 20.20 (140) defeating Essendon 8.9 (57) This was at that time a record margin in a grand final; signifying the juggernaut that Hawthorn was to become during the 1980s. Hawthorn competed in the next two grand finals against rival Essendon, losing the 1984 Grand Final due to Essendon's famous final quarter charge, and losing the 1985 Grand Final by a far greater margin; souring the final game of club legend Leigh Matthews. Playing alongside him was young Jason Dunstall, from Coorparoo, Queensland; he was recruited after winning the QAFL goalkicking in 1984.

1986 VFL Grand Final	G	B	Total
Hawthorn	16	14	110
Carlton	9	14	68
Venue: Melbourne Cricket Ground	Crowd: 101,861

Their second premiership of the 1980s came the following year in the 1986 Grand Final, with Hawthorn 16.14 (110) defeating Carlton 9.14 (68) convincingly, with Gary Ayres winning his first of two Norm Smith Medals. 1987 saw Hawthorn finish second to a superior Carlton team. The fact that Hawthorn even made it to the grand final is still the centre of some controversy; with Gary Buckenara's after the siren kick in the 1987 Preliminary Final breaking the hearts of tens of thousands of Melbourne supporters.

1988 VFL Grand Final	G	B	Total
Hawthorn	22	20	152
Melbourne	6	20	56
Venue: Melbourne Cricket Ground	Crowd: 93,754

Ill health to coach Allan Jeans meant that Football Operations Manager Alan Joyce took the coaching position for 1988. The Hawks lost only 3 games for the year; Jason Dunstall kicked 132 goals and the team would win the 1988 Premiership 22.20 (152) against Melbourne 6.20 (56); a then-record margin in a Grand Final of 96 points. Gary Ayres won his second Norm Smith Medal.

The 1989 season was viewed as one of the most spectacular VFL/AFL seasons to date; with Dunstall again kicking a century of goals, the resurgence of Geelong and dominating play of Geelong great Gary Ablett Sr., and the greatest grand final of the modern era occurring in this year.

1989 VFL Grand Final	G	B	Total
Hawthorn	21	18	144
Geelong	21	12	138
Venue: Melbourne Cricket Ground	Crowd: 94,796

The Hawks defeated Geelong in the 1989 Grand Final. The match is now legendary for its amazing toughness, physicality, skill, massive scoring and tension. The Hawks jumped out to an enormous lead as Geelong attempted to unsettle the Hawks through rough physical play. However, the physical toll on the Hawks began to show as the match wore on; with John Platten being concussed, Robert DiPierdomenico puncturing his lung, Dermott Brereton breaking his ribs and Michael Tuck splitting the webbing on his hand. By midway through the final quarter the Cats were charging; with Hawthorn desperately trying to hold off the Cats' avalanche of goals while containing the brilliance of Ablett who ended the match with a grand final record of 9 goals. Hawthorn's experience and determination allowed them to hold off Geelong just long enough, scraping through to victory by one goal.

==== 1990–1991 ====
Other clubs have had success since but none have matched the sustained dominance of the Hawks' record seven successive grand finals to end the 1980s. Leading players of this decade included Dermott Brereton, Gary Ayres, Chris Mew, Michael Tuck, Jason Dunstall, Gary Buckenara, John Platten and Chris Langford.

Injuries to key personnel hampered Hawthorn's 1990 campaign. Jason Dunstall and Dermott Brereton both missed many games, others like Robert DiPierdomenico carried injuries into the finals. The Hawks bowed out in the Elimination Final to Melbourne. Alan Joyce replaced Allan Jeans as coach for the 1991 season, which began with the Hawks winning the pre-season cup, before they suffered an embarrassing 86-point loss to AFL newcomers Adelaide at Football Park in the opening match of the season proper. However, on the back of the recruitment of skillful South Australian Darren Jarman and with improvement from young players, such as Paul Hudson, Ben Allan and Stephen Lawrence the team bounced back to reach the 1991 Grand Final.

1991 AFL Grand Final	G	B	Total
Hawthorn	20	19	139
West Coast	13	8	86
Venue: Waverley Park	Crowd: 75,230

Grand Final Day 1991 was a historic occasion. It was the only grand final played at Waverley Park and featured the first-ever appearance by a non-Victorian team. West Coast had dominated the home and away season but Hawthorn, written off by many early in the season, won the match. West Coast began the match kicking with the aid of a strong wind blowing down to the main scoreboard end and kicked the opening four goals. However, from that point the Hawks began to gain the ascendancy and, if not for inaccuracy in front of goal in the second term, they would have had a significant half-time lead. Having maintained the half-time margin, against the wind, in the third term, the Hawks scored 8.4 (52) to 1.3 (9) in the final quarter, to win a fifth premiership in nine seasons. A feature of the Hawks' performance was that its two best players — Paul Dear and Stephen Lawrence — were from the team's younger brigade. It was Michael Tuck's last game and he bowed out with the league record for games (426), finals (39), grand finals (11) and premierships (7). At the end of 1991, Hawthorn selected a young Shane Crawford with pick 13 in the National Draft, who eventually became the only surviving link between this era of success and its next triumph 17 seasons later. During the 1992 summer, the Hawthorn players' T-shirts had "Too old. Too slow. Too good" written on them.

=== End of an era: 1992–1996 ===
After having shared Princes Park with Carlton as a home venue since 1974, Hawthorn began to move its home games to Waverley Park in Mulgrave in Melbourne's south-east in 1990. The club played five home games at Waverley Park and the balance at Princes Park in each of 1990 and 1991, and played all home games at Waverley Park from 1992. To further strengthen their links with the area a second social club was established nearby at the Waverley Gardens shopping centre. The club, which operates as a gaming venue, has also been a lucrative source of revenue for the club.

The end of the 1993 season saw the first cracks in the Family Club facade; coach Alan Joyce was replaced by Peter Knights and club legends Gary Ayres and Dermott Brereton departed. Chris Mew injured his achilles tendon and retired. Behind the scenes the Hawthorn board began to spend large amounts of money that the club didn't have, board members flew first class to games interstate and $1 million was spent renovating club offices by a company owned by the then-club president. Despite a decade of onfield success, the club failed to attract supporters who would become long term backers of the club. Loss of key players continued, Ben Allan was offered the captaincy of the new Fremantle Dockers and left at the end of 1994, as did Andrew Gowers, who went to Brisbane. After a promising start in 1995 the Hawks lost their last seven games to finish fifteenth and missed the finals for the first time since 1981. The board sacked the coaching staff and appointed Ken Judge who was an assistant to David Parkin at Carlton. Club Champion Darren Jarman told the club he wanted to return to Adelaide.

==== Proposed merger ====
Falling on-field and off-field fortune saw the club almost merge with Melbourne in 1996. The resulting club was to be known as the "Melbourne Hawks" – a fusion with the Melbourne nickname of "Demons". A groundswell of support led by former champion Don Scott scuttled the proposal, with Hawthorn members voting strongly against it. Melbourne members supported the merger by a small margin. The failure of the merger led to the resignation of the board and its replacement, led by businessman Ian Dicker.

=== 1997–2004 ===
After fighting off the merger the new board launched the "Proud, Passionate and Paid Up" campaign in a bid to get more members. 27,450 memberships were bought by supporters, more than doubling the memberships from the previous year. Even in the successful years of the 1980s the club struggled to get 10,000 members. The team won the 1999 pre-season competition but missed out on the finals of the premiership season. Ken Judge resigned at the end of 1999 to accept the coaching job at the West Coast Eagles.

Peter Schwab was appointed coach of the Hawks for the 2000 season and the team played a more attacking style than the "accountable football" discipline of Judge. The Hawks reached the semi-finals before losing to the reigning premiers North Melbourne. The team made steady progress all over the field. Daniel Chick and Nick Holland were the joint winners of the Peter Crimmins Medal. Chance Bateman became the second Indigenous Australian to play for Hawthorn.

In 2001 the Hawks again enjoyed a successful year, but it was to be their last for several seasons. The Hawks won eight games straight at the start of the season and, despite faltering late in the home-and-away season, had a close win in a semi-final against Port Adelaide and made it to the preliminary finals in when they narrowly lost to Essendon. In the off-season, Hawthorn traded Trent Croad and Luke McPharlin for the Number 1 draft pick, Luke Hodge, no. 20 (Daniel Elstone) and no. 36 (Sam Mitchell). Croad would return to Hawthorn two years later.

The Hawks missed the finals altogether in 2002, finishing tenth, which was considered a very disappointing result for the club. Shane Crawford won the Peter Crimmins Medal after another strong season. Players that made their debuts that year, Luke Hodge, Sam Mitchell, Campbell Brown, Robert Campbell and Mark Williams would all play in the 2008 premiership side. In the off-season, the Hawks again proved to be big players and gained the services of St Kilda ruckman Peter Everitt.

After a poor start to the 2003 season, the Hawks went on to finish the second half of the year strongly and finished in ninth position, narrowly missing the finals. Sam Mitchell shone for the Hawks and won the AFL Rising Star award. This form had punters excited and the team was early favourites for a top four finish the next year. Shane Crawford once again won the Peter Crimmins Medal and also came second in the Brownlow Medal by a single vote.

During the 2004 pre-season Hawthorn coach Peter Schwab declared that the Hawks would "win the premiership" although this statement would be followed by a horrific season for Hawthorn as the Hawks managed just four wins and eighteen losses. The club imploded, and by mid-season coach Peter Schwab was sacked, and Captain Shane Crawford broke his arm, and eventually relinquished the captaincy. Following the collapse of the club on the field, many players either left or were sacked from the club. Nathan Thompson left the club citing a fresh start following his admission that he suffered from depression. Rayden Tallis, Mark Graham, Kris Barlow and Lance Picioane were also released from the club. More than 700 games of experience left the club following the season.

=== Alastair Clarkson era: 2005–2021 ===
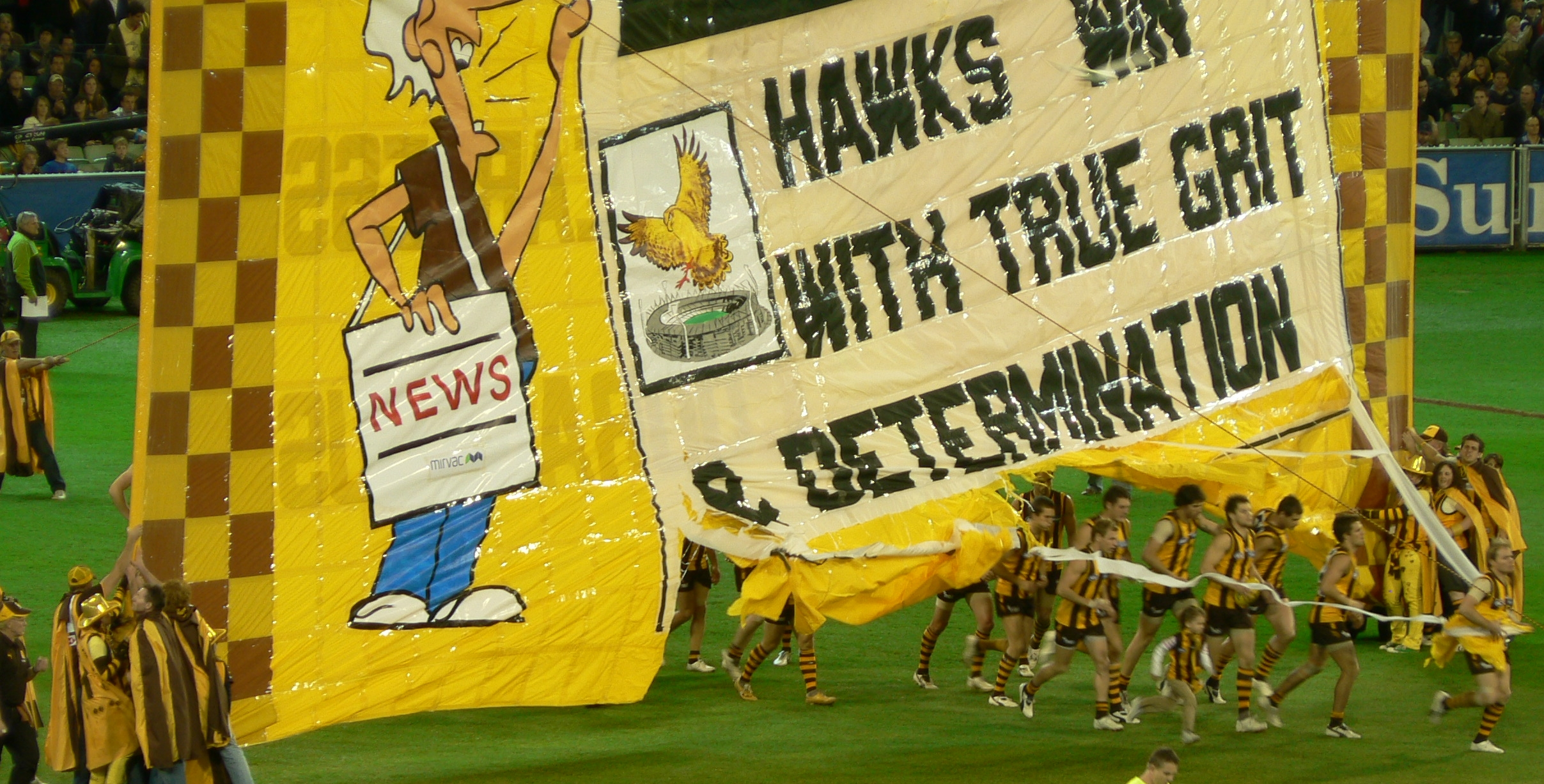
Hawks players run through the banner in a 2007 semi-final against the Kangaroos, led by then-captain Richard Vandenberg in his final game.

==== Building blocks: 2005–2006 ====
After the turmoil of the 2004 season Hawthorn produced a surprise move by appointing Alastair Clarkson, a little known Port Adelaide assistant coach, to his first senior AFL coaching role for the 2005 season. Clarkson was selected over the higher profiled former players Terry Wallace and Gary Ayres and embarked on a rebuild of the team, delisting older players and instituting a youth policy. Club veterans Rayden Tallis, Mark Graham, Kris Barlow, Luke McCabe and Lance Picioane left the club while Nathan Thompson was traded to North Melbourne. In turn, the Hawks took Jarryd Roughead, Lance Franklin and Jordan Lewis at picks 2, 5 and 7 respectively in the 2004 AFL draft. With Clarkson at the helm, the Hawks made solid progress and instituted a culture of discipline at the club. During the 2005 season, Hawthorn won only five games and finished in 14th position. Despite this, the Hawks showed some promising growth in their young players, with Franklin, Roughead and Lewis all winning Rising Star nominations during that season. Shane Crawford also had a return to form after a terrible 2004 when he broke his arm, and finished 3rd in the Peter Crimmins Medal tally.

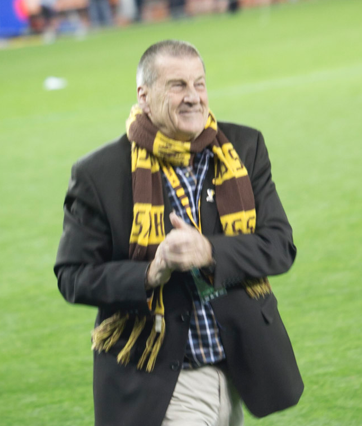
Former Victorian premier Jeff Kennett, the 2005–2011 and 2017–2022 club president

Former number one draft pick Luke Hodge also had a breakthrough season in 2005, winning the Peter Crimmins Medal, All-Australian jumper and coming equal 4th in the Brownlow Medal (15 votes) from half-back. Peter Everitt and Trent Croad were also named in the All-Australian team. After 2005, another round of culling took place and the club bid farewell to Angelo Lekkas, Nick Holland and Steven Greene.

Hawthorn recruited Xavier Ellis (pick 3), Beau Dowler (pick 6), Grant Birchall (pick 14), Max Bailey (pick 18) and Beau Muston (pick 22) all early in the 2005 draft; two of those selections were received by trading 2001 All-Australian full-back Jonathan Hay to North Melbourne and Nathan Lonie to Port Adelaide.

After numerous years of planning, the club relocated its administrative headquarters from Glenferrie Oval to a state-of-the-art redeveloped facility at Waverley Park in the early stages of 2006. Glenferrie Oval was to remain the spiritual home of the club. In 2006, Clarkson showed innovation by restructuring the forwards into a system that came known as "Buddy's box", a tactic that involved the formation of a 4-tall-man forward line playing in a square formation. The strategy however was highly dependent on the tall forwards' ability to take contested marks, with the lack of small forwards meaning that opposition teams can easily rebound if the ball hit the ground. Starting the season 4–1 after the first five rounds, the Hawks faltered and lost twelve of the next thirteen games to fall to 5–13. The team won the final four matches to finish eleventh. Hawthorn's progress up the ladder, developing youth, and attacking style of play saw coach Alastair Clarkson rewarded with a new 2-year contract after the mid-season break.

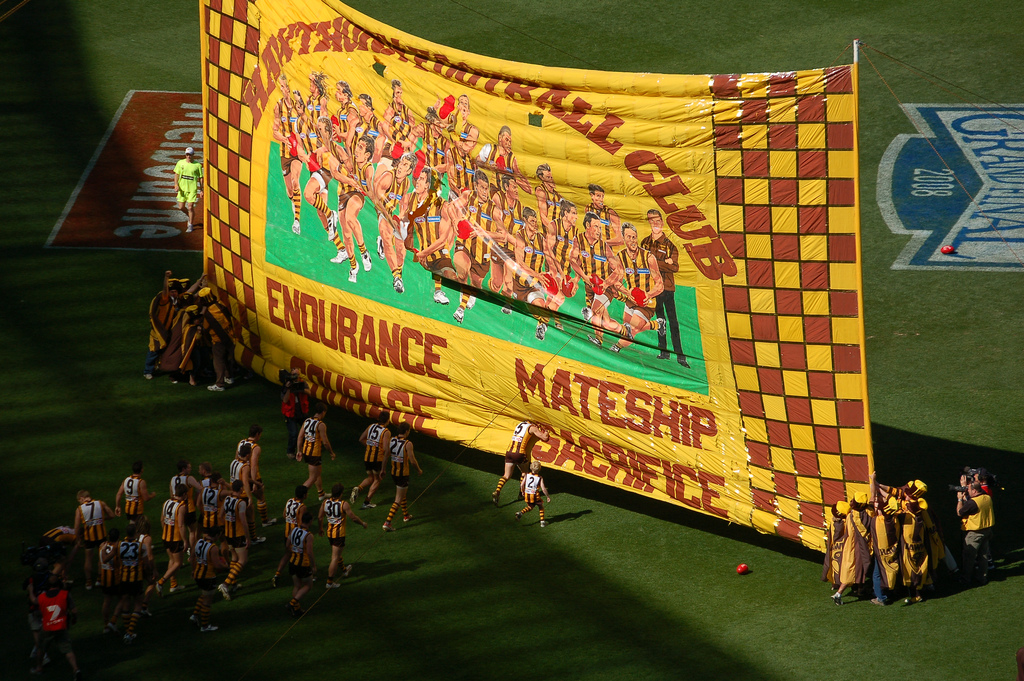
The Hawks ran out onto the MCG on Grand Final Day in 2008, with the banner saying: Endurance, Mateship, Courage, Sacrifice

==== Return to finals and premiership: 2007–2008 ====
At the end of the 2006 season, the Hawks increased their commitment to the Tasmanian market where they had developed a large support base with four games to be played at the University of Tasmania Stadium in Launceston each year, and with the Tasmanian Government becoming an official sponsor of the club, in one of the biggest sponsorship deals in Australian sporting history, worth $15–20 million. Clarkson brought to the club delisted footballers Brent Guerra and Stephen Gilham who he knew from his time at Port Adelaide. The Hawks continued to improve in 2007, winning 13 games and finishing fifth on the Premiership table. This took them into the finals, where they defeated Adelaide in the Elimination Final, in which Lance Franklin kicked his seventh goal seconds from the final siren, before being eliminated in the semi-final against North Melbourne. The club recorded its 11th consecutive year-end profit at the close of the 2007 season, a record A$3.6 million. On Draft day 2007 Clarkson went against his own policy when he recruited recently retired Stuart Dew and youngster Cyril Rioli. Clarkson also introduced a new style of play that became known as the "Clarkson Cluster", a strategy that involved a rolling 15-man zone that protected the midfield corridor when the Hawks did not have possession of the ball. This would force opposition teams to chip the ball around the flanks, rather than being able to transition it through the corridor to provide run and carry to the forward line. This play would eventually become unstuck and allow the Hawks to eventually turn the ball over from their opponents and retake possession.

2008 AFL Grand Final	G	B	Total
Hawthorn	18	7	115
Geelong	11	23	89
Venue: Melbourne Cricket Ground	Crowd: 100,012

Throughout the 2008 AFL season, Hawthorn played a brand of football that became known as "unsociable"—a rough, physical style of play which conceded a lot of free kicks, but regardless asserted a physical dominance for the club. Hawthorn finished second on the home-and-away ladder with a record of 17–5, and progressed to the 2008 Grand Final to defeat Geelong 18.7 (115) to 11.23 (89), who had lost only one match during the season until then. Hawthorn would go on to lose its next eleven encounters with Geelong, allegedly caused by the "Kennett curse". Lance Franklin won the Coleman Medal with 102 goals, becoming the first player for more than a decade to score 100 goals within the home-and-away season.

==== Hangover: 2009–2010 ====
The 2008 Grand Final would become the last game for Trent Croad and Shane Crawford in their AFL careers—Crawford retired after the season, with 305 games service, and Croad suffered a foot injury during the Grand Final which kept him out of the following season, ultimately leading to his retirement. After the 2008 premiership, opposition teams worked hard at picking the "Clarkson cluster" apart. The effects of this were masked by injuries to key players. The Hawks slipped down the ladder to finish ninth in 2009, with their premiership defence ending with them missing the finals altogether. Following on from this disappointing season, the Hawks established a pattern of recruiting established players, with Shaun Burgoyne and Josh Gibson arriving ahead of the 2010 season.

A poor start to 2010 saw the club lose six out of its first seven games, including a defeat against a struggling Essendon side in round 6 by 43 points. With Clarkson's job as coach on the line, the team finally abandoned the cluster for a new tactic that concentrated more on a precision kicking style. The change resulted in eleven wins, only three losses and a draw followed, and it was enough for them to make the finals, finishing seventh and drawing an away final against the Fremantle Dockers in Perth, which they lost by 30 points. The Hawks bolstered ranks by bringing in out of favour North Melbourne forward/ruck David Hale during the trade period.

==== Dynasty: 2011–2016 ====
In 2011, Hawthorn finished a reasonably unheralded home and away season with a record of 18–4, finishing third on the ladder. The Hawks then lost to Collingwood by three points in the preliminary final. Lance Franklin won the Coleman Medal and an All-Australian guernsey; Josh Gibson, Sam Mitchell and Grant Birchall were also nominated for All-Australian positions. The Hawks traded in Jack Gunston for the 2012 season.

In 2012, Hawthorn finished on top of the home and away season ladder with a record of 17–5, finishing as minor premiers for the first time since 1989. They defeated Collingwood and Adelaide by 38 and 5 points, respectively, to advance to their second Grand Final in five years; however, despite leading by two goals midway through the final term they were defeated by the Sydney Swans by 10 points.

2013 AFL Grand Final	G	B	Total
Hawthorn	11	11	77
Fremantle	8	14	62
Venue: Melbourne Cricket Ground	Crowd: 100,007

In 2013, Hawthorn again finished as minor premiers after a home and away season record of 19–3. During the season Jarryd Roughead won the John Coleman Medal for the first time. The club also traded in Brian Lake, an experienced defender from the Western Bulldogs. Lake went on to win the Norm Smith Medal for his efforts in the Grand Final. Hawthorn defeated the Fremantle Dockers by 15 points to claim their 11th premiership after a tough and scrappy game. Teammates joining Lake as premiership players who began their careers at other clubs were Jonathan Simpkin, Jack Gunston (the runner-up in Norm Smith voting with his 4 goals), David Hale, Shaun Burgoyne, Josh Gibson and Brent Guerra.

2014 AFL Grand Final	G	B	Total
Hawthorn	21	11	137
Sydney	11	8	74
Venue: Melbourne Cricket Ground	Crowd: 99,460

In 2014 the club was able to overcome adversity to win its twelfth premiership. Former leading goalkicker Lance Franklin left the club as a free agent soon after the 2013 premiership, linking up with the Sydney Swans on a multimillion-dollar contract over nine years, new recruit Dayle Garlett retired before the start of the season, and coach Alastair Clarkson missed a month due to illness (during which Brendon Bolton acted as caretaker coach for five matches). The 2014 premiership saw Will and Chris Langford become the first father/son premiership players at the club since Peter Hudson (1971) and his son Paul (1991) (Chris's teammate John Kennedy Jr played in four premierships, whilst his father John Kennedy Sr. coached the club to three flags.).

2015 AFL Grand Final	G	B	Total
Hawthorn	16	11	107
West Coast	8	13	61
Venue: Melbourne Cricket Ground	Crowd: 98,632

In 2015, Hawthorn began the season in inconsistent form, with a 4–4 win–loss record after the first 8 rounds of the year, before going on to record 8 consecutive victories, a run which ended with a loss to Richmond in Round 18. Hawthorn ended up winning 4 of their final 5 matches to finish with a 16–6 win–loss record, qualifying for their 6th successive final series. The club entered the Grand final for the fourth year running, coming in the hard way after losing the qualifying final in Perth to the West Coast. The team then went on to defeat Adelaide in the semi-final before taking on the minor premiers Fremantle again in Perth. On the hottest Grand Final day in history, verging on 31 degrees Celsius, the Hawks defeated the Eagles to claim their third flag in a row - a feat last achieved by the Brisbane Lions (2001–2003). It was their thirteenth overall.

2016 began with the retirements of triple premiership players Brian Lake and David Hale, and the club entered the season without Jarryd Roughead, who had injured his knee in late 2015. With Roughead ready to return from the injury, it was announced that he had been diagnosed with a recurrence of his melanoma, and would be out indefinitely (he would return to full training in early 2017.) The absence of Roughead limited Hawthorn's scoring potential, the club won six games by less than 10 points, but the club was leading the competition until two late losses saw them hang onto the top four. Although the club was a top four team it was rated last in the contested possession, a statistic that would cost them against the better teams. After a loss in the qualifying final to rival Geelong following a missed set shot by Issac Smith after the siren, Hawthorn were knocked out of the finals by eventual premiers the Western Bulldogs. During the trade period, the club shocked the competition by trading Sam Mitchell and Jordan Lewis, who had finished first and second in the Peter Crimmins Medal, to West Coast and Melbourne, respectively. The club also traded Brad Hill to Fremantle. Hawthorn then traded in Tom Mitchell from Sydney, and former Rising Star winner Jaeger O'Meara from Gold Coast, as well as signing Ty Vickery as a free agent from Richmond, and Ricky Henderson as a delisted free agent.

==== Final years: 2017–2021 ====
Before the season, the club announced that Luke Hodge had stood down as captain, and Jarryd Roughead, returning from his battle with melanoma, would captain the club in 2017. The 2017 season saw the club not entering the top eight at any stage of the season, and after back-to-back 86-point losses to Gold Coast and Geelong in rounds 3 and 4, the club sat last on the ladder. After another huge loss to St Kilda in round 6, the club looked like a shadow of their former selves. A victory over Sydney in the final minutes of the round 10 game saw a small amount of hope return, but the next week against Port Adelaide, the club was kept to just three points in the first half en route to another major loss. The club entered the bye in round 13 second last on the ladder. The club was also suffering from the absence of Ben Stratton, Grant Birchall, Cyril Rioli and James Frawley, who all played minimal football in the year. New recruit Jaeger O'Meara also missed 16 games with knee problems, though he managed to return at the end of the season. However, after the bye, the club produced one of the most stunning reversals of form seen in years. The club would win six of their next ten games, as well as a draw against Greater Western Sydney to only miss the finals by six points. The resurgence came through a dramatic lineup reshuffle by Clarkson, sending established forwards Jack Gunston and James Sicily into defence, defender Taylor Duryea to the forward line and defender Daniel Howe into the midfield as a tagger. Ryan Burton established himself as one of the emerging star defenders in the competition, while Blake Hardwick became a regular in the Hawks' back 6. After multiple years on the list, Daniel Howe, Kaiden Brand and Tim O'Brien all found themselves as regulars in the side as well. The highlight for the season was recruit Tom Mitchell, who broke the AFL record for the most 30 possession games in a season, as well as for the most possessions by one player in a season, earning Mitchell his first All-Australian selection, as well as the Peter Crimmins medal.

Off the field, the club also went through a number of controversies. Tracey Gaudry was appointed as the club's first female CEO, only to resign five months later, though it is publicly believed she was sacked by the club. This also led to the resignation from the presidents position of Richard Garvey, and the return of former president Jeff Kennett. Former premiership captain Luke Hodge announced his retirement before his 300th game, only to change his mind after the season was completed, requesting to play on with the Brisbane Lions, where he was later traded. The club's only other major trade saw Port Adelaide speedster Jarman Impey join the club. After the lodging of the 2018 lists, Vickery announced he was retiring. He had played just six games for the club.

The season opened with Tom Mitchell collecting a record 54 possessions against Collingwood, it was the start of a great year for Mitchell who would later win the 2018 Brownlow medal. The team was able to mix it with the best until a mid season form slump saw them slip out of the top eight. Cyril Rioli retired mid season due to family reasons. The team surprised many of the pre-season tipsters by finishing fourth after a six-game winning streak at the end of the minor rounds. The Hawks were able to get a full season out of stars, James Frawley, Ben Stratton and Jaeger O'Meara all of whom missed a lot of football the year before. The club was able to get experience into its young players, Harry Morrison, Blake Hardwick and Ryan Burton continued to show improvement while the club blooded new recruits James Worpel, Mitchell Lewis, Dave Mirra and Irishman Conor Nash.

Hawthorn's 2019 preseason began horrendously after Mitchell broke his leg at training, sidelining the Brownlow Medallist for the entirety of the 2019 season. The Hawks struggled for most of the year without their prime mover and they were unable to string wins together until the final eight weeks of the season. After just five wins in their first fourteen matches of the year, the Hawks made a stunning rally, winning six of their last eight to almost make the finals. They ultimately finished ninth with an 11–11 win–loss record.

Mitchell returned for the 2020 season, but Hawthorn would fall even further than they did in 2019. The Hawks would finish in the bottom four for the first time since Clarkson began coaching the team in 2005, finishing 15th with a paltry 5–12 win–loss record. The club farewelled two three-time premiership players in captain Ben Stratton and Paul Puopolo.

On 6 July 2021, the Hawthorn Football Club announced that as part of a succession plan that Sam Mitchell would succeed Clarkson as the head coach of Hawthorn from 2023 and that until then, Mitchell would continue as Head of Development and as Box Hill Hawks senior coach. However, on 30 July 2021, it was announced that Clarkson would leave Hawthorn at the conclusion of the 2021 AFL season, with Mitchell immediately succeeding him.

==== Historical racism accusations (2022) ====
In September 2022, the club commissioned an external review of its historical treatment of Indigenous players, covering the period of Clarkson's tenure, including premiership years. Allegations within the report included accusations of racism, including the coerced removal of First Nations players from families and the demanding of a pregnancy termination over the course of several years. Clarkson, assistant coach Chris Fagan, and head of player development Jason Burt were among officials alleged to have been complicit. AFL CEO Gillon McLachlan said that the news was a "challenging, harrowing, and disturbing read," and the AFL will launch an external, independent investigation into the allegations.

=== Sam Mitchell era (2022–present) ===
Hawthorn's first two seasons under Mitchell did not achieve success, finishing 13th in 2022 and 16th in 2023. However, the Hawks played a successful 2024 campaign.

Hawthorn started the 2024 season 0–5, but would lose just five more games for the rest of an amazing season. The Hawks would make the finals for the first time since 2018, finishing seventh with a 14–9 win–loss record. In doing so, they became one of just a select few teams in VFL/AFL history to play finals after starting a year that poorly.

The Hawks knocked the Western Bulldogs out of premiership contention with a 37-point victory in the elimination final, before their fairytale campaign came to an end after an emotionally charged three-point semifinal loss to Port Adelaide.

Hawthorn had another solid campaign in 2025, finishing eighth with 15 wins and eight losses. The Hawks improved on their 2024 finals run and reached a preliminary final for the first time since the 2015 premiership, before bowing out following a 30-point loss to eventual runner-up Geelong.

== Season summaries ==
List of the last five seasons completed by Hawthorn. For the full season-by-season history, see List of Hawthorn Football Club seasons

Season	Won	Lost	Drawn	Position	Finals	Coach	Captain	Leading goalkicker	Peter Crimmins Medal
2022	8	14	0	13th	Did not qualify	Sam Mitchell	Ben McEvoy	Luke Breust	James Sicily
2023	7	16	0	16th	Did not qualify	Sam Mitchell	James Sicily	Luke Breust	Will Day
2024	14	9	0	7th	Lost semi-final (Port Adelaide) 72–75	Sam Mitchell	James Sicily	Mabior Chol	Jai Newcombe
2025	15	8	0	8th	Lost Preliminary final (Geelong) 85–115	Sam Mitchell	James Sicily	Jack Gunston	Jack Gunston
2026	15	6	2	4th	Lost Preliminary final (Brisbane Lions) 122–131	Sam Mitchell	Jai Newcombe; James Sicily	Jack Gunston	Nick Watson

== Club symbols ==
=== Logo, crest and mascot ===
When Hawthorn entered the VFL in 1925 their nickname was known as The Mayblooms. The origins of this nickname are unclear, although "Maybloom" was another name for the Hawthorn bush. In Round 2, 1943 when Hawthorn played Essendon, the match report in the Sporting Globe newspaper announced that prior to the start of the game at Glenferrie, Roy Cazaly, Hawthorn's coach told the players that in future they would be known as the Hawks instead of the Mayblooms. Cazaly said I expect players to live up to the name being ready to fight hard and carry the ball away with pace and dash to the goal. The Hawthorn FC has had four VFL/AFL endorsed logos in its entirety. The first (1977), a flying Hawk, was an adaptation of a pre-existing unofficial logo that appeared on the club's official documentation throughout the 1960s and 1970s. The Hawks' Mascot Manor representative and club mascot is Hudson "Hawka" Knights, a caricature of a hawk dressed the same way as the Hawthorn players and slightly depicting club champion Dermott Brereton.

Official Logo

1977–1981

Hawthorn's first official logo was introduced in 1977. It was a predominantly gold shield featuring the 'Flying Hawk' emblazoned across the face, with a brown football with the letters "HFC" in its talons. The first edition of this shield, like all other VFL logos at the time, had a royal blue border around the text section, but it became no longer compulsory and in 1980 a full brown border was brought in.

1982–1996

In 1982, however, on the back of a large-scale marketing drive, "The new force of the 80s", the club adopted the famous "Hawk Head" created by Swinburne Institute student Velda Ellis. The logo was different from the other VFL clubs as it was only the head, all the other clubs used the whole body of their mascots. It is still closely linked to the club 20 years after being replaced. The Hawk Head was a popular choice amongst Hawthorn FC supporters as the club had five Premierships, eight Grand Finals and 14 finals appearances during its 15 years of use.

1997–2007

On the back of the failed 1996 proposed merger of Hawthorn with the Melbourne Football Club, Hawthorn, under Ian Dicker, looked to a new banner for a change of fortunes in 1997. The "New Hawks" adopted a modernistic version of the pre-existing "Flying Hawk" and was launched with the infamous "Proud, Passionate and Paid Up" membership drive in 1997. The new logo was successful in drumming up support for the Hawks, as the club went from one of the lowest-supported clubs to being the first club in Victoria to attract more than 30,000 members in the space of only two years. Since then the club grew to a consistent level of support, becoming one of the largest clubs in Victoria.

2008–present

On Saturday, 6 October 2007, club president Jeff Kennett, launched the club's fourth logo in 30 years at a function at Crown Casino. The new logo, which has striking similarities to the Hawk Head of the '80s and '90s was a project of Cato Purnell Partners. In describing the logo, Cato has made reference to the eye and beak of the Hawk representing the "determination, pride and focus" of Hawthorn. During the first 11 seasons that the logo was in use, the club only missed the finals on two occasions, compared with the previous 1997 logo, which saw the club only make the finals in three of 11 seasons.

=== Club guernsey ===
The Hawthorn colours are brown and gold vertical stripes. Hawthorn has worn this design since 1950. The current major sponsors are Tasmania, iiNet, Bupa, Nissan and Adidas. Some of their former major sponsors are MBF, Samsung, HSBC and Puma. The standard home guernsey is used in all home and away games in Victoria, Sydney and Tasmania while the away guernsey is used in every away game in Adelaide, Perth and Brisbane. The club's colours and designs have changed a few times during their history. From 1902 to 1904 they wore a blue guernsey with red shoulders and a red stripe down the front of the guernsey along with blue and white hooped socks. After they merged with Boroondara in 1905 they changed to a black guernsey with a red sash with black and red hooped socks. After the club had struggled for a few years it was decided to reform it and for seasons 1912–13 and they wore a yellow guernsey with a blue V. Upon entering the VFA the club was forced to change their colours again, as Williamstown already had the combination Blue and Gold on their guernseys, and adopted the colours brown and gold which have since remained to this day although the design has changed a few times, the main ones being:

1925–49 kit
- 1914–1924 – brown with a gold circle around the neck and the HFC monogram in the centre
- 1925–1932 – brown with a gold V and a smaller HFC monogram on the left breast
- 1933–1934 – gold with a brown V
- 1934–1949 – brown with a gold V and brown socks with gold tops
- 1950–1974 – brown and gold stripes front and back with black numbers on a white panel and brown and gold hooped socks
- 1975–1988 – brown and gold stripes with a plain gold back and brown numbers with brown and gold hooped socks
- 1989–1997 – brown and gold stripes with a plain gold back and brown numbers with plain gold socks
- 1998–2005 – brown and gold stripes with a plain gold back and brown numbers with brown and gold hooped socks
- 2006–2012 – brown and gold stripes front and back with black numbers on a white panel and brown and gold hooped socks
- 2013–present – brown and gold stripes front and back with brown numbers on a gold panel and brown and gold hooped socks

In 2018, Hawthorn president Jeff Kennett stated that Hawthorn's clash guernseys will no longer feature white, declaring that "White is the colour of surrender, and at Hawthorn we never surrender. We might get beaten, but we fight every match out to the final siren".

The Hawthorn Football Club has a reputation for particularly unappealing guernseys, with special attention drawn to a jumper nicknamed "The White Power Ranger", described as "retina-damaging" by The Age, and to another jumper worn for one game in the 1995 preseason deemed the "blue diamonds", which inexplicably featured significant amounts of blue. The latter jumper was called "the worst AFL jumper ever worn" by Fox Sports.

=== Club song ===
The Hawthorn club song is entitled "We're a Happy Team at Hawthorn" and is sung to the tune of "The Yankee Doodle Boy", which was written by George M. Cohan for his 1904 musical Little Johnny Jones. In the musical Johnny Jones is a patriotic US jockey competing in England. The song gained prominence when it was featured in the wartime 1942 musical Yankee Doodle Dandy starring James Cagney as George M. Cohan performing the part of Johnny Jones on stage. The song was adapted with new Hawthorn lyrics by Chick Lander in 1956.

== Corporate ==
=== Current issues ===
The closure of Waverley Park in 1999 was a setback as Hawthorn could no longer play home games in the south-east region where they have developed a large support base. Home games were moved to the Melbourne Cricket Ground. Their relationship with the south-east was rekindled in 2006 when the Hawks returned to Waverley as a training and administration centre. The oval and a section of the Sir Kenneth Luke stand have been retained by developer Mirvac as part of their redevelopment of the Waverley site as a housing estate, largely as a result of a Victorian government commitment to keep football there. Mirvac leases the facility to Hawthorn for a peppercorn rent, until the club takes ownership of the facility within the next 20 years. Hawthorn will maintain their association with Glenferrie, by housing several coteries and conducting social activities at the club's spiritual home.

In August 2005, former Victorian State Premier Jeff Kennett, a long time Hawthorn supporter and former number one membership ticket holder, was appointed to the board of the club with the intention of standing for president at the next coming annual general meeting. His rise to presidency was confirmed when on 14 December 2005, he was ushered in as president of the Hawthorn Football Club unopposed to the audience of a packed Hawthorn Town Hall. On 30 September 2008, the Hawthorn Football Club's relationship with Glenferrie Oval was rekindled when the club hosted a Supporters Day at the club's spiritual home celebrating the club's 10th premiership, attended by an estimated 20,000 fans. On 29 September 2013, the Hawthorn Football Club shared the spoils with their supporters again at Glenferrie Oval, celebrating the club's 11th premiership with more than 22,000 fans in attendance.

=== Dingley development ===
In 2025, Hawthorn moved its headquarters from Waverley Park to a new facility situated on a 28-hectare (69-acre) site in Dingley, containing a lavish new space for players, administration, and supporters modelled on English Premier League clubs Arsenal and Tottenham. Hawthorn president Andrew Newbold said "We want an elite training facility and administration facility, to align with our values of being a destination club. That's one bucket. The next is if you've got 80,000 members, how do you engage with them? We think this facility can tick that box." The site is named the Kennedy Community Centre, after former Hawthorn player and head coach John Kennedy Sr.

The first sod was turned in February 2024, with Hawthorn President Andy Gowers, CEO Ash Klein, Senior Coach Sam Mitchell, Prime Minister Anthony Albanese, along with state and local representatives present on the occasion. The construction of the Kennedy Community Centre will be undertaken in stages, with Stage 1 to consist of the construction of a community pavilion and AFLW oval featuring full broadcast capabilities and grandstand seating, and the Harris Elite Training and Administration Facility, comprising an indoor training field, high-performance gym and aquatic facilities and an MCG-sized oval. With the new site, Hawthorn is now the only team to own its own facility and the land on which it is situated.

Hawthorn's AFLW team held their final training session at Waverley Park on Tuesday 21 October 2025.

=== Relationship with Tasmania ===
Since 2001, Hawthorn has successfully cultivated a following in Tasmania, where the membership base has increased from 1,000 to more than 9,000 to 2014. Studies have valued Hawthorn's economic impact in Tasmania and national brand exposure to total $29.5 million in 2014. The club first started playing up to two home games per season at York Park in Launceston in 2001. Since 2006, Hawthorn has increased its presence in the state as part of an agreement with the tourism component of the Tasmanian government, whereby they are contracted to play up to four home games at York Park, whilst the Tasmanian government acts as the major sponsor of the club. This relationship was renewed for a further period of five years in November 2011. Hawthorn offered to play an additional home game in Tasmania as part of this deal. On 31 July 2015, Hawthorn extended their partnership with Tasmania for a further five years. Hawthorn continued to sign extensions to their Tasmanian arrangement, culminating in an agreement which will last until the end of the 2027 season. In 2026 the AFL ended Hawthorn's home games at York Park, citing the entry of the Tasmania Football Club into the competition in 2028.

=== Reconciliation plan ===
On 19 July 2019, Hawthorn launched their reconciliation plan, which builds upon a foundation of existing programs and events and lays the groundwork towards fulfilling the club's aspirations of becoming leaders in community connection to Aboriginal and Torres Strait Islander cultures.

=== Five-year plans ===
==== "five2fifty" ====
At their 2007 Annual General Meeting, Hawthorn embarked on a 5-year business plan titled "five2fifty", the core idea being that in the next five years the club would target to win 2 premierships and have fifty thousand members. As part of the plan, the football club wanted to be seen as the most professional club in the AFL, and it placed great emphasis on the welfare of the people associated with the club. Hawthorn managed to achieve the 50,000-member milestone in 2009, and they won four premierships over the next eight years.

==== "All for One" ====
Following the completion of the "five2fifty" business plan in 2012, Hawthorn released a new business plan, "All for One". Striving for 80,000 plus members and investing a further $35m into capital investment projects in and around Waverley Park, the Hawks have set themselves an objective to become "the destination club", targeting successive top four finishes over the 2013 to 2017 period. Central to successfully achieving its commercial objectives, the Hawks have identified the importance of solidifying its status as a major MCG tenant as crucial to growing its membership and crowd support.

==== "HANZ-UP" ====
In 2009 Hawthorn launched a community-based program called "HANZ-UP! AFL Program" in New Zealand. The Hawks announced they had entered the New Zealand market, with an initial three-year deal with an option to extend the partnership until the end of 2018. Hawthorn has joined with AFLNZ to promote HANZ-UP! through programs such as KiwiKick (a New Zealand version of Auskick), the Hawks Cup (a Year 9 and Year 10 schools competition) and the Trent Croad Scholarship Scheme (AFL international scholarships). Annual skills clinics will also be held throughout New Zealand featuring Hawthorn players. KiwiKick will see all participants receiving kits branded with the Hawks and HANZ-UP! logos, while Hawks Cup players will be given exclusive Hawthorn merchandise.

New Zealand–born Kurt Heatherley became the first player to make his AFL debut in 2016. Raised in New Zealand, the club had spotted him as a fourteen-year-old, and the club signed him in 2011. His development was through the TAC cup and the VFL. He was rookie-listed in 2014 and promoted to the main list in 2015. He played five games before being delisted at the end of 2018.

=== Corporate profit or loss ===
The Hawthorn Football Club financial year ends on 31 October each year.

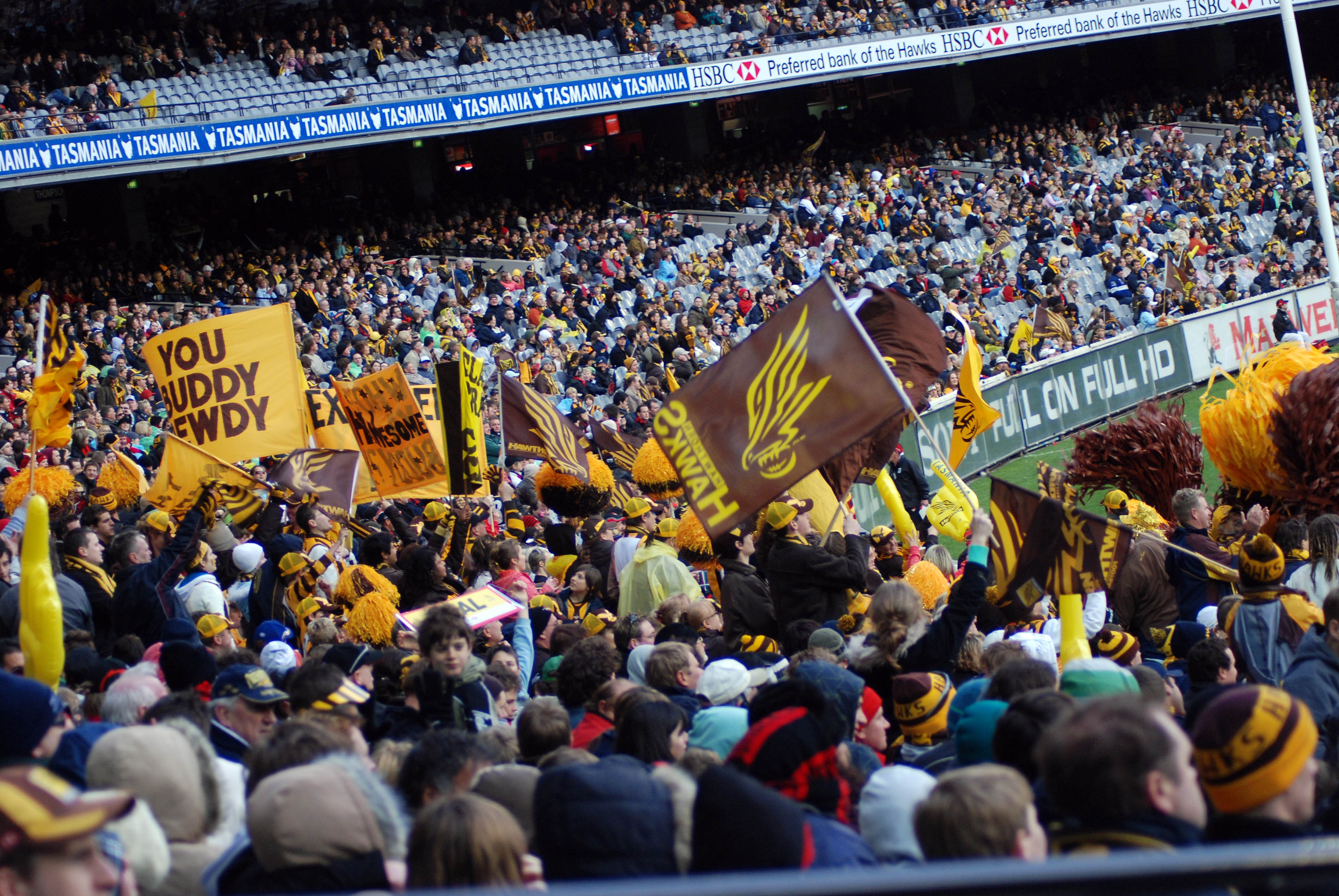
Supporters of Hawthorn at the MCG

Year	Net operating profit	Year	Net operating profit	Year	Net operating profit	Year	Net operating profit	Year	Net operating profit
1991	$5,740	1998	$331,250	2005	$90,937	2012	$2,023,720	2019	$2,150,210
1992	$430,925	1999	$722,941	2006	$308,632	2013	$3,118,672	2020	$496,809
1993	$630,000	2000	$500,472	2007	$3,603,477	2014	$3,420,400	2021	$1,715,481
1994	$233,000	2001	$1,139,213	2008	$4,054,367	2015	$3,332,972	2022	$752,006
1995	$14,927	2002	$1,264,581	2009	$2,724,245	2016	$2,573,491	2023	$1,433,431
1996	$1,111,879	2003	$104,347	2010	$2,326,545	2017	$2,107,556	2024	$1,708,041
1997	$808,204	2004	$101,000	2011	$1,712,428	2018	$2,011,363	2025	$1,959,787

=== Support ===
Hawthorn boasts a huge support base throughout Australia, particularly in Victoria and Tasmania. In a survey appearing in the 9 July 2008 edition of the Herald Sun, 11% of respondents barracked for Hawthorn, behind only Collingwood (14%), Essendon (12%) and Carlton (12%). As an MCG tenant, Hawthorn is among the top 5 crowd-drawing clubs in the league, averaging crowds of more than 50,000 to their MCG home games since 2008. Since 1997, Hawthorn has drawn the fifth-largest crowds to home and away matches, drawing more than 36,000 per game across all home and away games.

Most of this widespread support can be accredited to the club's success in the 1970s and 1980s as the club successfully nurtured talent in its home 'zones'—primarily in the south and east of Victoria, as well as recruiting interstate talent from all over Australia. As a result, the club has a very widespread membership with 7,000 Tasmanian members, 3,000 WA members and 3,000 QLD and NSW members complementing the club's 45,000 Victorian members. In 2007 Hawthorn stated its ambitions were to grow their membership to beyond 50,000 by 2011 which was achieved in 2009. By 2012, Hawthorn became just the second club to grow membership beyond 60,000, setting a goal of reaching 80,000-plus members by 2017. In 2008, the Hawthorn Football Club drew 1,164,396 to all 25 completed games, a club record and seventh-largest aggregate attendance for any club, of all time. In May 2009, the Hawthorn Football Club boasted the largest membership in the AFL, becoming the first Victorian club to break the 51,000 barrier for membership. In all, Hawthorn has drawn more than 1,000,000 annual fans to AFL matches in 7 separate seasons—2008 and 2011–2016.

=== Membership base and crowds ===
Hawthorn's official membership figures 1925–1983 (Note: Hawthorn Football Club Membership 1925–1983 from club records and Annual Reports and includes all memberships issued – adult, player/staff, life, donor/patron/sponsor, junior, student, pensioner, complementary etc.)

Year	Total Members	Year	Total Members	Year	Total Members	Year	Total Members	Year	Total Members	Year	Total Members
1925	1544	1935	1223	1945	1438	1955	4774	1965	5165	1975	5963
1926	1600 (Note: indicates official figure was an estimate)	1936	1412	1946		1956	5513	1966	4150	1976	6036
1927	1730	1937		1947	2872	1957	5382	1967	4685	1977	7062
1928	1469	1938	2000	1948		1958	6852	1968	3337	1978	7132
1929	1375	1939		1949	2427	1959	5569	1969	4246	1979	
1930	1632	1940		1950	2822	1960	4737	1970	4599	1980	
1931	1240	1941		1951	2702	1961	6016	1971	5173	1981	
1932		1942		1952	2896	1962	6397	1972	7409	1982	
1933		1943		1953	2830	1963	5526	1973	5557	1983	
1934	1460	1944	1948	1954	3477	1964	6927	1974	5140		

The table below also contains crowd figures along with club membership numbers from 1984. Total attendance includes finals matches.

Hawthorn Football Club Membership 1984–2025
Year	Total Members	Total attendance	Average attendance
1984	8,051	688,714	27,548
1985	7,713	724,136	27,851
1986	7,335	696,958	27,878
1987	6,516	687,039	26,425
1988	7,099	625,448	26,060
1989	8,520	626,623	26,109
1990	9,882	730,512	31,761
1991	10,006	735,780	29,431
1992	12,338	717,775	31,208
1993	11,388	636,110	30,291
1994	11,245	643,975	27,999
1995	12,728	574,277	26,103
1996	12,484	588,819	25,573
1997	27,005	710,654	32,380
1998	27,649	686,470	31,200
1999	32,120	733,485	33,340
2000	26,879	829,893	34,578
2001	30,140	909,950	36,398
2002	33,319	776,517	35,329
2003	31,500	685,693	31,181
2004	31,255	624,343	28,379
2005	29,261	729,754	31,511
2006	28,003	691,924	31,541
2007	31,064	881,144	36,714
2008	41,436	1,164,396	46,575
2009	52,496	895,089	40,686
2010	53,978	922,136	41,915
2011	56,353	1,079,855	43,194
2012	60,841	1,145,476	45,819
2013	63,353	1,144,222	45,769
2014	68,650	1,156,205	46,248
2015	72,924	1,155,359	44,437
2016	75,351	1,013,973	42,249
2017	75,663	866,536	39,388
2018	81,017	976,282	40,678
2019	81,211	787,621	35,801
2020	76,343	96,551	7,427
2021	77,079	380,056	21,114
2022	81,494	639,238	29,056
2023	80,698	782,535	34,023
2024	83,823	1,087,355	43,494
2025	87,204	1,103,461	42,441
2026	92,095¹		

¹ as of 10 November 2026

=== Sponsorship ===
Year	Kit Manufacturer	Major Sponsor	Shorts Sponsor	Bottom Back Sponsor	Top Back Sponsor	Neckline Sponsor
1977–1981	–	Wynvale	–	–	–	
1982–1994	–	BFC Finance	–	–	–	
1984–1992	–	Household Finance	–	–	–	
1993	–	Oz Child	–	–	–	
1994	–	Oz Child	Help Stop The Hurt	MBF	–	
1995–1996	–	MBF	MBF	MBF	–	
1997	–	MBF	Subaru	MBF	–	
1998–1999	Puma	Samsung	Strathfield	Samsung	–	
2000	Puma	Samsung	Crazy John's	Samsung	–	
2001–2002	Puma	Samsung	AAPT Smart Chat	Samsung	–	
2003	Puma	Samsung	Mitsubishi Motors	Samsung	–	
2004–2005	Puma	HSBC Bank Australia	Mitsubishi Motors	HSBC Bank Australia	–	
2006	Puma	HSBC Bank Australia	Sofia	HSBC Bank Australia	–	
2007–2008	Puma	Tasmania	MBF	HSBC Bank Australia	–	
2009–2010	Puma	Tasmania	HBA	HSBC Bank Australia	–	
2011–2012	Puma	Tasmania	Bupa	HSBC Bank Australia	–	
2013–2015	Adidas	Tasmania	Bupa	iiNet	–	
2016–2018	Adidas	Tasmania	Audi	iiNet	–	
2019	Adidas	Tasmania	Nissan	iiNet	–	
2020	Adidas	Tasmania	Nissan	iiNet	Tasmania (round 2–round 7); Nissan (round 8–round 22)	
2021–2022	Adidas	Tasmania	Nissan	iiNet	KFC	
2023–2024	ISC	Tasmania	Nissan	iiNet	KFC	Skechers
2025	ISC	Tasmania	Nissan	Superhero	KFC	Skechers
2026	Under Armour	Tasmania	Nissan	Superhero	KFC	

== Rivalries ==
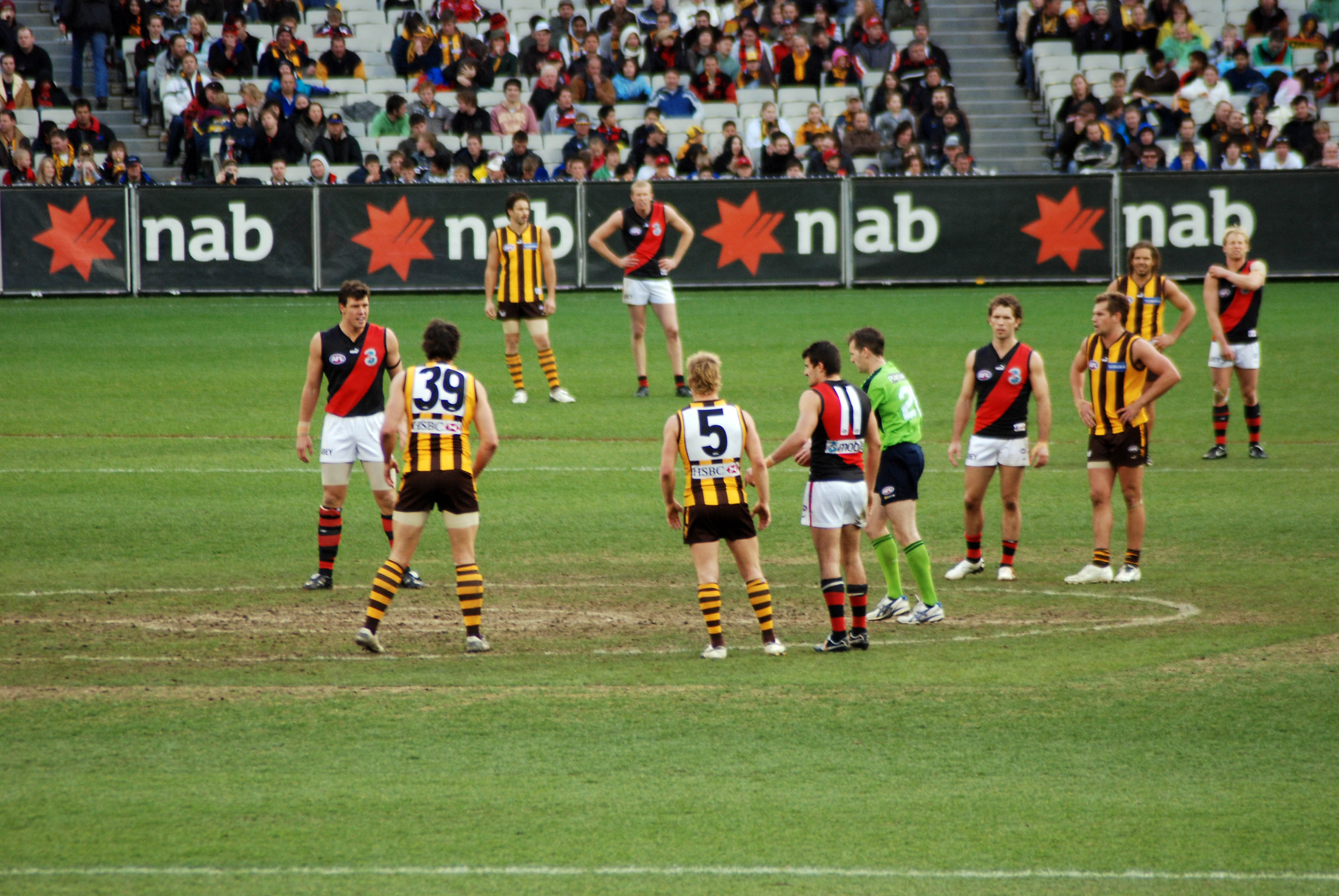
Games between the Hawks and the Bombers have proved spectacular, due to wild brawls

Essendon – The clubs contested the Grand Final in three consecutive seasons between 1983 and 1985. The rough nature of these games, and several others between the two, made them fierce rivals during the 1980s; particularly during those years where they were the top two sides of the competition. In the 1990s and right up until 2004 the rivalry became more quiet and uneventful with the exception of the 2001 preliminary final, which was the first time they met in a finals game since the 1980s. More recently, the clubs have played two matches which saw bench-clearing brawls: the "Line in the Sand Match" in 2004, which resulted in four players being suspended and $70,700 in fines; and the final round of 2009, a match which would decide eighth place between the two teams, in which four players were suspended for a total of seven matches and $27,000 in fines being handed out. The latter brawl was famously sparked by Matthew Lloyd who applied a very hard bump, knocking out Brad Sewell, in what would be Lloyd's last game.

Geelong – The rivalry between Hawthorn and Geelong is defined by two Grand Finals: those of 1989 and 2008. In the 1989 Grand Final, Geelong played the man, resulting in major injuries for several Hawks players: Mark Yeates smashed into Dermott Brereton at the opening bounce with a premeditated blind-side hit; Garry Hocking knocked Hawthorn's champion rover, John Platten out of the game with a concussion and Gary Ablett cannoned so hard into the back of Robert DiPierdomenico when Dipper took a mark that he broke Dipper's ribs and punctured one of his lungs. It was a free-flowing, high-scoring contest with unrelenting brutality and was regarded by many as one of the greatest games ever. The Hawks led by 30 to 40 points for most of the match, but as their injury toll started to mount, the Geelong players and their fans started to find self-belief. The Hawks were reduced to 13 fit players in the last quarter with 5 others hurt and unable to come off the ground. e.g. DiPierdomenico played out the entire match with broken ribs and a slowly-deflating lung. Hawthorn controlled the game, leading by approximately 40 points for most of the match; in the last quarter, Geelong almost managed to come from behind to win, piling on 8 goals for the quarter and falling short by 6 points.

In the 2008 Grand Final, Geelong was the overwhelming favourite having lost just only one match for the season and winning 23 games by an average of 52 points. But Hawthorn managed to pull off a magnificent upset victory by 26 points thanks in part to a stellar performance by Luke Hodge in defence and also a match-winning five minute burst from Stuart Dew late in the 3rd quarter.

Over the next 5 years, Geelong won eleven successive matches vs Hawthorn. Many of these were gut-wrenching losses for the Hawks and thrilling contests for neutral TV viewers. Nine of the losses were by single-digit margins. Five losses were by less than a goal. In 9 of the 11 matches, Geelong came from behind to win after trailing in the 3rd or 4th quarter. The Hawthorn-Geelong rivalry reached unprecedented fervour and Hawthorn's losing streak was dubbed the "Kennett curse" in reference to comments made by a gloating Hawthorn president Jeff Kennett following the 2008 Grand Final. It was later revealed that after the 2008 grand final, Paul Chapman initiated a pact between other Geelong players to never lose to Hawthorn again. The curse was finally broken in the 2013 Preliminary Final when Hawthorn snatched a heart-stopping 5 point victory.

In twenty matches between the two sides between 2008 and 2017, twelve were decided by less than ten points, with Geelong victorious in eleven of those twelve matches.

North Melbourne – Hawthorn and North Melbourne have a rivalry that dates back to the 1970s when they played off against each other in three Grand Finals in the space of four years. Both teams entered the VFL in the 1925 expansion, and were generally unsuccessful through the first few decades, but the two teams were both very strong through the 1970s, sparking a rivalry. The two clubs played in the 1975, 1976 and 1978 Grand Finals, with North Melbourne winning their first-ever premiership in 1975 by 55 points, Hawthorn winning in 1976 by five goals, and Hawthorn winning in 1978 by three goals. From 1974 to 1978 the two clubs played against each other in ten finals, and took each other on for the Australian Championship in Adelaide in 1976.

Sydney Swans – Hawthorn's rivalry with the Sydney Swans date back to the 2011 Second semi final and the clubs have met in two infamous Grand Finals of the 2010s. In 2012, minor premiers Hawthorn were grand final favourites, only to be upset by the Swans. The rivalry grew in 2013, when Hawthorn forward Lance Franklin transferred to the Swans as a free agent on a nine-year, $10 million deal. In 2014, the Swans finished minor premiers, and went into the grand final overwhelming favourites, only for Hawthorn to avenge the 2012 loss with a 63-point win. The rivalry has also been fueled by trading between the clubs, with third generation Hawk Josh Kennedy being traded to the Swans in 2009, and going on to have a great deal of success at his new club. In 2016, father-son Swan Tom Mitchell requested and was granted, a trade to Hawthorn, winning the Brownlow Medal in his second season.

== Players ==
=== Current squad ===
Hawthorn Football Club · AFL personnel
Playing list		Inactive list	Coaching staff
1 Harry Morrison; 2 Mitchell Lewis; 3 Jai Newcombe (c); 4 Jarman Impey; 5 Nick Watson; 6 James Sicily (c); 7 Ned Reeves; 8 Dylan Moore; 9 Connor Macdonald; 10 Karl Amon; 11 Conor Nash; 12 Will Day; 13 Calsher Dear; 14 Jack Scrimshaw; 15 Blake Hardwick; 16 Massimo D'Ambrosio; 17 Lloyd Meek; 18 Mabior Chol; 19 Jack Gunston	21 Noah Mraz; 22 Cameron Nairn; 23 Josh Weddle; 24 Josh Battle; 25 Josh Ward; 27 Will McCabe; 28 Cameron Mackenzie; 31 Matthew LeRay; 33 Jack Ginnivan; 34 Jack Dalton; 35 Ollie Greeves*; 37 Tom Barrass; 40 Max Beattie*; 41 Matt Hill*; 42 Bailey Macdonald; Josh Goater; Ben King; Zach Merrett; Ollie Purcell*		Senior coach: Sam Mitchell; Assistant coaches: Kade Simpson (back line); David Mackay (midfield); Adrian Hickmott (forward line); David Hale (structure/opposition); David Mirra (development); Jason Williams (development); Jason Johannisen (development); Dion Prestia (development); Legend: (c) captain; * rookie; Updated: 17 November 2026; Sources: Players, coaches

==== Guernsey retirement ====
At the end of the 1976 season, Hawthorn retired guernsey number 5, worn by former captain Peter Crimmins, following Crimmins' death. The guernsey would stay retired until 1993, when Gwen Crimmins, Peter's widow, chose Andy Collins to wear the guernsey. Since then, the Crimmins family have selected the player they think should wear the number 5, with only Daniel Harford, Sam Mitchell, Ryan Burton, James Worpel and Nick Watson chosen to wear the number.

On 6 March 2011, at its annual family day, club representatives announced that as of the 2011 season the no. 1 guernsey would be officially retired as a player number and instead presented as a tribute to the fans. Max Bailey, who was the last player to wear no. 1, made the announcement by saying "the fans are number 1". He then presented the cheer squad with a giant Hawthorn guernsey displaying "1" on its back. The oversized guernsey will be on display at selected home games. On 7 December 2018, at its open training session, it was announced that the number would be un-retired, with Harry Morrison chosen to wear it, in honour of his late-godfather Ken Judge who wore the number during his time at Hawthorn.

== Staff ==
=== Coaching staff ===
Coach	Assistant coaches	Development coaches	General Manager – Football Operations
Sam Mitchell	Kade Simpson (backs) David Mackay (midfield) Adrian Hickmott (forwards) David Hale (structure and opposition)	Daniel Giansiracusa (head of development) Jason Johannisen David Mirra Jason Williams	Rob McCartney

=== Officials ===
President	Vice President	Directors	CEO	General Managers
Andrew Gowers	Katie Hudson	Andrew Kaye James Merlino Luke McCabe Anne–Marie Pellizzer Ian Silk Luke Stambolis Tristan Sternson Owen Wilson	Ash Klein	Brooke Boger (GM Communications Digital Media & Marketing) Kerrie Brewer (GM Foundation & Events) Jason Burt (GM People, Culture & Integrity) Tanya Gallina (GM Customer Service & Tasmania) Jerome Lyford (GM Commercial Partnerships & Corporate Sales) Mark McKenzie (National Recruiting Manager) Nick Holland (GM-Legal, Risk & Integrity)

== Club honour board ==
=== Achievements ===
Premierships
Competition	Level	Wins	Years won
Australian Football League	Seniors	13	1961, 1971, 1976, 1978, 1983, 1986, 1988, 1989, 1991, 2008, 2013, 2014, 2015
Australian Football League	Reserves (1919–1999)	4	1958, 1959, 1972, 1985
Australian Football League	Under 19s (1946–1991)	1	1972
VFL Women's	Seniors	1	2018
Other titles and honours
Championship of Australia	Seniors	1	1971
McClelland Trophy	Multiple (Note: Between 1951 and 1990 the McClelland Trophy was awarded to the club with the highest-aggregate points across the VFL/AFL seniors premiership, VFL/AFL reserves premiership, and VFL/AFL under 19s premiership. Between 1991 and 2022 it was awarded to the club who finished on top of the AFL premiership ladder, thereby merging it with the minor premiership. Since 2023 it has been awarded to the club with the highest aggregate-points across the AFL and AFL Women's competitions.)	9	1961, 1971, 1984, 1985 (tied), 1986, 1988, 2012, 2013, 2024
VFL Night Series	Seniors	3	1968, 1969, 1977
NFL Night Series	Seniors	1	1976
AFC Night Series	Seniors	2	1985, 1986
AFL pre-season competition	Seniors	4	1988, 1991, 1992, 1999
Victorian Junior Football Association	Reserves	1	1924
Victorian Blind Football League	Seniors (Hawthorn)	1	2019, 2024
Victorian Blind Football League	Seniors (Brown)	1	2023
Victorian Wheelchair Football League	Seniors	1	2023
Finishing positions
Australian Football League	Minor premiership	9	1961, 1963, 1971, 1975, 1986, 1988, 1989, 2012, 2013
Australian Football League	Grand Finalist	6	1963, 1975, 1984, 1985, 1987, 2012
Australian Football League	Wooden spoons	11	1925, 1927, 1928, 1932, 1941, 1942, 1946, 1949, 1950, 1953, 1965

- Hawthorn is the only club in the VFL/AFL to have won Senior Premierships in the 1960s, 1970s, 1980s, 1990s, 2000s and 2010s (decade)

=== VFL/AFL grand finals ===
Date	Coach	Captain	Opponent	Score	Venue	Attendance	Norm Smith Medal
23-Sep-1961	John Kennedy Sr.	Graham Arthur	Footscray	13.16 (94) – 7.9 (51)	Melbourne Cricket Ground	107,935	
05-Oct-1963	John Kennedy Sr.	Graham Arthur	Geelong	8.12 (60) – 15.19 (109)	Melbourne Cricket Ground	101,209	
25-Sep-1971	John Kennedy Sr.	David Parkin	St Kilda	12.10 (82) – 11.9 (75)	Melbourne Cricket Ground	118,192	
27-Sep-1975	John Kennedy Sr.	Don Scott	North Melbourne	9.13 (67) – 19.8 (122)	Melbourne Cricket Ground	110,551	
23-Sep-1976	John Kennedy Sr.	Don Scott	North Melbourne	13.22 (100) – 10.10 (70)	Melbourne Cricket Ground	110,143	
30-Sep-1978	David Parkin	Don Scott	North Melbourne	18.13 (121) – 15.13 (103)	Melbourne Cricket Ground	101,704	
24-Sep-1983	Allan Jeans	Leigh Mathews	Essendon	20.20 (140) – 8.9 (57)	Melbourne Cricket Ground	110,332	Colin Robertson
29-Sep-1984	Allan Jeans	Leigh Mathews	Essendon	12.9 (81) – 14.21 (105)	Melbourne Cricket Ground	92,865	Billy Duckworth (ESS)
28-Sep-1985	Allan Jeans	Leigh Mathews	Essendon	14.8 (92) – 26.14 (170)	Melbourne Cricket Ground	100,042	Simon Madden (ESS)
27-Sep-1986	Allan Jeans	Michael Tuck	Carlton	16.14 (110) – 9.14 (68)	Melbourne Cricket Ground	101,861	Gary Ayres
26-Sep-1987	Allan Jeans	Michael Tuck	Carlton	9.17 (71) – 15.14 (104)	Melbourne Cricket Ground	92,754	David Rhys-Jones (CAR)
24-Sep-1988	Alan Joyce	Michael Tuck	Melbourne	22.20 (152) – 6.20 (56)	Melbourne Cricket Ground	93,754	Gary Ayres
30-Sep-1989	Allan Jeans	Michael Tuck	Geelong	21.18 (144) – 21.12 (138)	Melbourne Cricket Ground	94,796	Gary Ablett Sr. (GEE)
28-Sep-1991	Alan Joyce	Michael Tuck	West Coast	20.19 (139) – 13.8 (86)	Waverley Park	75,230	Paul Dear
27-Sep-2008	Alastair Clarkson	Sam Mitchell	Geelong	18.7 (115) – 11.23 (89)	Melbourne Cricket Ground	100,012	Luke Hodge
29-Sep-2012	Alastair Clarkson	Luke Hodge	Sydney	11.15 (81) – 14.7 (91)	Melbourne Cricket Ground	99,683	Ryan O'Keefe (SYD)
28-Sep-2013	Alastair Clarkson	Luke Hodge	Fremantle	11.11 (77) – 8.14 (62)	Melbourne Cricket Ground	100,007	Brian Lake
27-Sep-2014	Alastair Clarkson	Luke Hodge	Sydney	21.11 (137) – 11.8 (74)	Melbourne Cricket Ground	99,454	Luke Hodge
3-Oct-2015	Alastair Clarkson	Luke Hodge	West Coast	16.11 (107) – 8.13 (61)	Melbourne Cricket Ground	98,632	Cyril Rioli

=== Finishing positions (after finals) ===
Note: bold indicates finals appearance

Finishing Position	Year	Tally
Premiers	**1961**, **1971**, **1976**, **1978**, **1983**, **1986**, **1988**, **1989**, **1991**, **2008**, **2013**, **2014**, **2015**	13
Grand Finalist	**1963**, **1975**, **1984**, **1985**, **1987**, **2012**	6
3	**1957**, **1974**, **1977**, **1982**, **2011**	5
4	**2001**, **2025**, **2026**	3
5	1943, 1960, 1964, 1969, **1990**, **2016**, **2018**	7
6	1958, 1968, 1972, 1981, **1992**, **1993**, **2000**, **2007**, **2024**	9
7	1956, 1959, 1973, 1979, **1994**, **2010**	6
8	1937, 1955, 1970, 1980, **1996**	5
9	1936, 1940, 1954, 1962, 1966, 1999, 2003, 2009, 2019	9
10	1929, 1930, 1935, 1939, 1945, 1967, 2002	7
11	1926, 1931, 1933, 1934, 1938, 1942 1944, 1947, 1948, 1951, 1952, 2006	12
12	1925, 1927, 1928, 1932, 1941, 1946, 1949, 1950, 1953, 1965, 2017	11
13	1998, 2022	2
14	2005, 2021	2
15	1995, 1997, 2004, 2020	4
16	2023	1
17	-	0
18	-	0

=== Team of the Century ===
Hawthorn Team of the Century
B:	Gary Ayres	Kelvin Moore	Albert Mills
HB:	Col Austen	Chris Mew	Peter Knights
C:	Robert DiPierdomenico	Jim Bohan	Brendan Edwards
HF:	Graham Arthur (Captain)	Dermott Brereton	Gary Buckenara
F:	Jason Dunstall	Peter Hudson	John Platten
Foll:	Don Scott	Michael Tuck	Leigh Matthews
Int:	Chris Langford	Ian Law	Roy Simmonds
Int:	Paul Salmon		
Coach:	John Kennedy Sr		

=== Coaches ===
Correct as of the end of 2026

Category	Name	Total	Years
Most games	Alastair Clarkson	390	2005–2021
Most games won	Alastair Clarkson	228	2005–2021
Most home and away games	Alastair Clarkson	364	2005–2021
Most home and away games won	Alastair Clarkson	212	2005–2021
Most finals	Alastair Clarkson	26	2005–2021
Most finals won	Alastair Clarkson	16	2005–2021
Most Grand Finals	Allan Jeans	6	1981–1987; 1989–1990
Most Grand Finals won	Alastair Clarkson	4	2005–2021

=== Presidents ===
The following is a list of presidents of the Hawthorn Football Club.

President	Years
Charles Bethune	1914–1915
W. "Bill" Hulse	1916–1918
Edward Ward	1919
F.O. Small	1920
J."Bill" Kennon	1921–1931
Jacob Jona J.P.	1932–1949
David Prentice	1950–1952
A. "Sandy" Ferguson	1953–1967
Phillip Ryan	1968–1979
Ronald Cook	1980–1987
Trevor Coote	1988–1993
Geoff Lord	1993–1995
Brian Coleman	1995–1996
Ian Dicker	1996–2004
Jeff Kennett AC	2005–2011
Andrew Newbold	2012–2016
Richard Garvey	2016–2017
Jeff Kennett AC	2017–2022
Andrew Gowers	2022–present

== Players' individual honours and awards ==
Peter Crimmins Medal ("Best & Fairest") winners

Hawthorn's "Best & Fairest Award" is called the Peter Crimmins Medal in honour of former Hawthorn captain Peter Crimmins who played as a rover during 1966–1975 and led the side in 1974–75. He died of cancer just days after the club's 1976 premiership win. The match committee now awards the votes. The player with the maximum number of votes at the conclusion of the season is awarded the medal. (See Peter Crimmins Medal for the complete list of winners.)

Brownlow Medal
Awarded since 1924.

- Col Austen – 1949
- Robert DiPierdomenico – 1986
- John Platten – 1987
- Shane Crawford – 1999
- Sam Mitchell – 2012
- Tom Mitchell – 2018

Leigh Matthews Trophy
Awarded since 2002. (Retrospectively awarded to players from 1982, known as the VFLPA MVP until 1989, known as the AFLPA MVP until 2001.)

- Leigh Matthews – 1982
- Russell Greene – 1984
- Jason Dunstall – 1992
- Shane Crawford – 1999
- Tom Mitchell – 2018

Norm Smith Medal
Awarded since 1979.

- Colin Robertson – 1983
- Gary Ayres – 1986, 1988
- Paul Dear – 1991
- Luke Hodge – 2008, 2014
- Brian Lake – 2013
- Cyril Rioli – 2015

Coleman Medal
Awarded since 1981. (retrospectively awarded to players from 1955 to 1980)

- John Peck – 1963, 1964, 1965
- Peter Hudson – 1968, 1970, 1971, 1977
- Leigh Matthews – 1975
- Jason Dunstall – 1988, 1989, 1992
- Lance Franklin – 2008, 2011
- Jarryd Roughead – 2013

Michael Tuck Medal
Awarded from 1992 to 2013.

- Paul Hudson – 1992
- Paul Salmon – 1999

Best Captain

- Michael Tuck – 1986
- Luke Hodge – 2014

Robert Rose Award

- Luke Hodge – 2010

Ron Evans Medal
Awarded since 1993. (Known as the Rising Star award until 2007)

- Nick Holland – 1995
- Sam Mitchell – 2003

Best emerging player award
Awarded since 2003. (Known as the best young player from 2003–2025)

- Cyril Rioli – 2009
- Jai Newcombe – 2022

Marn Grook Award
Awarded from 2001 to 2007.

- Lance Franklin – 2007

Madden Medal
Awarded from 2007 to 2021.

- Luke Hodge – 2019

Carnival All-Australian team (1953–1979)

- Peter Hudson – 1969
- Bob Keddie – 1969
- Leigh Matthews – 1972
- Kelvin Moore – 1979
- Michael Tuck – 1979

VFL/AFL Team of the Year (1982–1990)

- Leigh Matthews – 1982, 1983
- Kelvin Moore – 1982
- David O'Halloran – 1982
- Terry Wallace – 1982, 1983
- Gary Ayres – 1983, 1986, 1988
- Russell Greene – 1983, 1984
- Michael Tuck – 1983, 1990
- Robert DiPierdomenico – 1984, 1986, 1987
- Chris Mew – 1984
- Dermott Brereton – 1986, 1988
- Gary Buckenara – 1986, 1988
- Greg Dear – 1986
- John Platten – 1986, 1987, 1988, 1989
- Chris Langford – 1987, 1988, 1989
- Russell Morris – 1987
- Jason Dunstall – 1988, 1989
- Darrin Pritchard – 1989
- Andrew Collins – 1990

All-Australian team
Awarded since 1991.

- Jason Dunstall – 1992, 1994
- Darren Jarman – 1992, 1995
- John Platten – 1992
- Ben Allan – 1993, 1994
- Chris Langford – 1994
- Shane Crawford – 1996, 1998, 1999, 2002
- Paul Salmon – 1997
- Jonathan Hay – 2001
- Joel Smith – 2001, 2003
- Trent Croad – 2005
- Peter Everitt – 2005
- Luke Hodge – 2005, 2008, 2010
- Campbell Brown – 2007
- Lance Franklin – 2008, 2010, 2011, 2012
- Sam Mitchell – 2011, 2013, 2015
- Grant Birchall – 2012
- Cyril Rioli – 2012, 2015, 2016
- Jarryd Roughead – 2013, 2014
- Luke Breust – 2014, 2018
- Jordan Lewis – 2014
- Josh Gibson – 2015
- Tom Mitchell – 2017, 2018
- Jack Gunston – 2018, 2025
- James Sicily – 2023
- Dylan Moore – 2024
- Josh Battle – 2025
- Jarman Impey – 2026
- Nick Watson – 2026

All-Australian team captain

- Luke Hodge – 2010

Goal of the Year
Awarded since 2001.

- Cyril Rioli – 2009
- Lance Franklin – 2010, 2013

Mark of the Year
Awarded since 2001.

- Nick Watson – 2026

22under22 team
Awarded since 2012.

- Luke Breust – 2012, 2013
- Jack Gunston – 2014
- Ryan Burton – 2017
- James Sicily – 2017
- James Worpel – 2019
- Changkuoth Jiath – 2021
- Will Day – 2023
- Jai Newcombe – 2023
- Massimo D'Ambrosio – 2024
- Jack Ginnivan – 2024
- Josh Weddle – 2024, 2025, 2026
- Nick Watson – 2025, 2026

J. J. Listen Trophy
Awarded since 1945.

- Sam Mitchell – 2002
- Mitch Hallahan – 2013
- Alex Woodward – 2014

Norm Goss Memorial Medal
Awarded since 1983

- Jonathan Simpkin – 2013
- David Mirra – 2018
- Ollie Greeves – 2026

Jim 'Frosty' Miller Medal
Awarded since 1999

- Sam Grimley – 2014, 2015

International Rules representative

- Bob Keddie – 1967
- Ian Law – 1967
- Peter Hudson – 1968
- Des Meagher – 1968
- Peter Knights – 1978
- Don Scott – 1978
- Michael Tuck – 1978
- Alan Martello – 1978
- Robert DiPierdomenico – 1984, 1986
- Dermott Brereton – 1984, 1986
- Russell Greene – 1984
- John Platten – 1984, 1986
- Chris Langford – 1986
- Gary Buckenara – 1986
- Peter Curran – 1986
- Dean Anderson – 1990
- Shane Crawford – 1998, 1999, 2002, 2003
- Nick Holland – 1998
- Trent Croad – 1999, 2000, 2005
- Jonathan Hay – 2001
- Joel Smith – 2001
- Daniel Chick – 2001
- Angelo Lekkas – 2002
- Jade Rawlings – 2003
- Luke Hodge – 2005, 2014, 2015
- Chance Bateman – 2006
- Campbell Brown – 2006, 2008
- Brad Sewell – 2008
- Michael Osborne – 2008
- Liam Shiels – 2011
- Matt Suckling – 2011
- Luke Breust – 2014, 2015
- Sam Mitchell – 2014, 2015
- Grant Birchall – 2014, 2015
- Jarryd Roughead – 2015
- Shaun Burgoyne – 2017
- Jack Gunston – 2017

International Rules series captain

- Shane Crawford – 2002, 2003
- Luke Hodge – 2015
- Shaun Burgoyne – 2017

Harry Beitzel Medal
Awarded from 1984 to 1990

- Robert DiPierdomenico – 1986

Jim Stynes Medal
Awarded since 1998

- Luke Hodge – 2014

== Coaches individual honours and awards ==
Jock McHale Medal
Awarded since 2001. (retrospectively awarded to premiership coaches from 1950 to 2000)

- John Kennedy Sr. – 1961, 1971, 1976
- David Parkin – 1978
- Allan Jeans – 1983, 1986, 1989
- Alan Joyce – 1988, 1991
- Alastair Clarkson – 2008, 2013, 2014, 2015

VFL Team of the Year (1982–1990)

- Allan Jeans – 1983, 1986

All-Australian team
Awarded since 1991 (premiership coach selected since 1999)

- Alastair Clarkson – 2008, 2013, 2014, 2015

Coaching Legend award

- John Kennedy Sr. – 2009
- David Parkin – 2012
- Allan Jeans – 2015

International Rules series

- Alastair Clarkson – 2014, 2015

== Records ==
Bold denotes player still plays for Hawthorn.

=== Games played ===
Correct as of the end of 2026

No.	Name	Years	Total
1	Michael Tuck	1972–1991	426
2	Leigh Matthews	1969–1985	332
3	Luke Breust	2009–2025	308
4	Sam Mitchell	2002–2016	307
5	Shane Crawford	1992–2008	305
5	Luke Hodge	2002–2017	305
7	Chris Langford	1983–1997	303
8	Don Scott	1967–1981	302
9	Kelvin Moore	1970–1984	300
10	Jarryd Roughead	2005–2019	283

=== Goals kicked ===
Correct as of the end of 2026

No.	Name	Years	Total
1	Jason Dunstall	1985–1998	1,254
2	Leigh Matthews	1969–1985	915
3	Peter Hudson	1967–1974; 1977	727
4	Michael Moncrieff	1971–1983	629
5	Lance Franklin	2005–2013	580
6	**Jack Gunston**	2012–2022; 2024–	578
6	Jarryd Roughead	2005–2019	578
8	Luke Breust	2009–2025	553
9	John Peck	1954–1966	475
10	Dermott Brereton	1982–1992	427

=== Playing records ===
Correct as of the end of 2026

Disposals
Player	Total
Michael Tuck	8,423
Sam Mitchell	8,095
Leigh Matthews	7,374
Luke Hodge	6,847
Shane Crawford	6,828
Jordan Lewis	6,273
Grant Birchall	5,486
John Platten	5,469
Liam Shiels	5,031
Shaun Burgoyne	4,634

Kicks
Player	Total
Michael Tuck	6,353
Leigh Matthews	6,017
Luke Hodge	4,308
Sam Mitchell	4,243
Shane Crawford	3,945
John Platten	3,850
Des Meagher	3,578
Peter Knights	3,356
Peter Crimmins	3,256
Jordan Lewis	3,233

Handballs
Player	Total
Sam Mitchell	3,852
Jordan Lewis	3,040
Shane Crawford	2,883
Luke Hodge	2,539
Grant Birchall	2,337
Brad Sewell	2,290
Shaun Burgoyne	2,172
Liam Shiels	2,137
Michael Tuck	2,070
Tom Mitchell	1,979

Marks
Player	Totals
Jason Dunstall	1,779
Jordan Lewis	1,521
Luke Hodge	1,508
Leigh Matthews	1,505
**Jack Gunston**	1,493
**James Sicily**	1,446
Grant Birchall	1,437
Shane Crawford	1,359
Peter Knights	1,348
Jarryd Roughead	1,320

Hitouts
Player	Total
Don Scott	4,184
Ben McEvoy	3,627
**Lloyd Meek**	2,647
Jonathon Ceglar	2,109
Paul Salmon	1,976
David Hale	1,870
Peter Everitt	1,823
Greg Dear	1,726
**Ned Reeves**	1,533
Robert Campbell	1,466

Tackles
Player	Total
Liam Shiels	1,426
Sam Mitchell	1,174
Luke Hodge	1,069
Luke Breust	1,061
Shaun Burgoyne	952
Brad Sewell	907
Shane Crawford	860
Cyril Rioli	860
Paul Puopolo	836
Jordan Lewis	751

Rebound 50s
Player	Total
**James Sicily**	979
Luke Hodge	851
**Blake Hardwick**	805
Grant Birchall	663
Sam Mitchell	633
Brent Guerra	585
**Jarman Impey**	487
Joel Smith	484
Jonathan Hay	482
Shane Crawford	458

Inside 50s
Player	Total
Sam Mitchell	1,152
Luke Hodge	1,057
Jordan Lewis	969
Liam Shiels	885
Shane Crawford	843
Isaac Smith	817
Luke Breust	792
Shaun Burgoyne	679
Cyril Rioli	669
Brad Sewell	667

Clearances
Player	Totals
Sam Mitchell	1,700
Jordan Lewis	1,040
Luke Hodge	965
Liam Shiels	797
Brad Sewell	746
**Jai Newcombe**	711
Shane Crawford	708
James Worpel	707
Shaun Burgoyne	653
Tom Mitchell	612

Contested Possessions
Player	Total
Sam Mitchell	3,181
Luke Hodge	2,486
Jordan Lewis	2,299
Luke Breust	2,015
Jarryd Roughead	1,978
Shaun Burgoyne	1,852
Liam Shiels	1,812
Brad Sewell	1,734
James Worpel	1,485
Shane Crawford	1,480

Uncontested Possessions
Player	Total
Sam Mitchell	4,946
Luke Hodge	4,246
Grant Birchall	4,186
Jordan Lewis	3,976
Isaac Smith	3,267
Liam Shiels	3,123
Shane Crawford	2,871
Shaun Burgoyne	2,666
**Jack Gunston**	2,523
**James Sicily**	2,518

Contested Marks
Player	Total
Jarryd Roughead	317
Lance Franklin	281
**James Sicily**	268
Ben McEvoy	246
**Jack Gunston**	216
Nick Holland	193
Luke Hodge	191
Trent Croad	176
Nathan Thompson	172
**Mitch Lewis**	142
Jade Rawlings	142

Marks Inside 50
Player	Total
Jarryd Roughead	633
**Jack Gunston**	585
Lance Franklin	561
Luke Breust	446
Mark Williams	301
Nathan Thompson	285
Ben Dixon	257
Cyril Rioli	200
**Mitch Lewis**	196
Nick Holland	176

1 percenters
Player	Total
Josh Gibson	1,334
Ben Stratton	1,107
Luke Hodge	904
**James Sicily**	800
**Blake Hardwick**	747
Ben McEvoy	687
James Frawley	596
Shaun Burgoyne	540
Jarryd Roughead	531
Campbell Brown	484

Goal assists
Player	Total
Luke Breust	246
Sam Mitchell	191
**Jack Gunston**	187
Cyril Rioli	187
Jordan Lewis	176
Jarryd Roughead	168
Luke Hodge	148
Paul Puopolo	138
**Dylan Moore**	122
Shaun Burgoyne	118

==== Season records ====
Correct as of the end of 2026

Statistic	Total	Name	Year
Disposals	848	Tom Mitchell	2018
Kicks	599	Terry Wallace	1983
Handballs	480	Tom Mitchell	2017
Marks	207	Jason Dunstall	1989
Marks	207	Josh Gibson	2015
Goals	150	Peter Hudson	1971
Behinds	88	Lance Franklin	2008
Hitouts	948	Lloyd Meek	2025
Tackles	162	Liam Shiels	2015
Rebounds	179	James Sicily	2022
Inside 50s	133	James Worpel	2024
Clearances	192	Tom Mitchell	2018
Contested possessions	388	Tom Mitchell	2018
Uncontested possessions	504	Tom Mitchell	2021
Contested marks	64	Lance Franklin	2008
Marks inside 50	125	Lance Franklin	2008
One percenters	259	Josh Gibson	2011
Goal assists	33	Dylan Moore	2024

==== Game records ====
Correct as of the end of 2026

Statistic	Total	Name	Game
Disposals	54	Tom Mitchell	vs. Collingwood, Round 1, 2018 at the Melbourne Cricket Ground
Kicks	38	Leigh Matthews	vs. Essendon, Round 3, 1978 at Waverley Park
Handballs	34	Tom Mitchell	vs. Collingwood, Round 1, 2018 at the Melbourne Cricket Ground
Marks	20	Danny Jacobs	vs. Brisbane Lions, Round 1, 2007 at The Gabba
Goals	17	Jason Dunstall	vs. Richmond, Round 7, 1992 at Waverley Park
Behinds	11	Lance Franklin	vs. Western Bulldogs, Round 21, 2007 at Docklands Stadium
Hitouts	59	Lloyd Meek	vs. St Kilda, Round 17, 2025 at Docklands Stadium
Tackles	17	Liam Shiels	vs. West Coast, Round 19, 2015 at Subiaco Oval
Rebounds	15	Luke Hodge	vs. Essendon, Round 20, 2006 at Docklands Stadium
Rebounds	15	James Sicily	vs. Adelaide, Round 1, 2019 at Adelaide Oval
Rebounds	15	James Sicily	vs. Greater Western Sydney, Round 16, 2022 at Sydney Showground Stadium
Inside 50s	12	Clinton Young	vs. Melbourne, Round 2, 2011 at the Melbourne Cricket Ground
Inside 50s	12	Liam Shiels	vs. Brisbane Lions, Round 17, 2018 at York Park
Clearances	22	Paul Salmon	vs. North Melbourne, Round 13, 1998 at Waverley Park
Contested possessions	27	Tom Mitchell	vs. Collingwood, Round 1, 2018 at the Melbourne Cricket Ground
Uncontested possessions	36	Sam Mitchell	vs West Coast, Round 5, 2009 at York Park
Contested marks	8	Nathan Thompson	vs. St Kilda, Round 13, 2002 at Docklands Stadium
Contested marks	8	Nick Holland	vs. St Kilda, Round 10, 2003 at the Melbourne Cricket Ground
Marks inside 50	11	Nick Holland	vs. Adelaide, Round 21, 2000 at the Melbourne Cricket Ground
One percenters	21	Josh Gibson	vs. Sydney, Semi-final, 2011 at the Melbourne Cricket Ground
Goal assists	6	Luke Breust	vs. Sydney, Round 7, 2013 at the Melbourne Cricket Ground

==== Team records ====
**Record**	**Total**	**Game**
Highest score	36.15 (231)	vs. Fitzroy, Round 6, 1991 at North Hobart Oval
Lowest score	1.7 (13)	vs. Melbourne, Round 9, 1926 at the Melbourne Cricket Ground
Highest score conceded	30.30 (210)	vs. Carlton, Round 2, 1969 at Princes Park
Lowest score conceded	2.5 (17)	vs. Brisbane Bears, Round 12, 1988 at Princes Park
Biggest win	165 points	vs. Port Adelaide, Round 21, 2011 at the Melbourne Cricket Ground
Biggest loss	141 points	vs. Melbourne, Round 9, 1926 at the Melbourne Cricket Ground
Consecutive wins	12	Round 9, 1961 – Grand Final, 1961
Consecutive wins	12	Round 2, 2013 – Round 14, 2013
Consecutive finals won	6	Qualifying final, 2013 – Grand Final, 2014
Consecutive losses	27	Round 16, 1927 – Round 6, 1929
Consecutive finals lost	4	Elimination final, 1992 – Qualifying final, 1996
Consecutive finals lost	4	Qualifying final, 2016 – Semi-final, 2018
Consecutive finals appearances	13	1982–1994
Consecutive Grand Final appearances	7	1983–1989
Consecutive Grand Final victories	3	2013–2015
Highest attendance	118,192	vs. St Kilda, Grand Final, 1971 at the Melbourne Cricket Ground
Highest home-and-away attendance	92,935	vs. Collingwood, Round 11, 1981 at Waverley Park

== Hall of Fame ==
=== Australian Football Hall of Fame ===
Hawthorn have 26 Hall of famers (23 players, 3 coaches) who contributed to the club.

Bold indicates legend status.

Hawthorn Football Club Hall of Famers
Players
Name	Years	Games	Goals	Inducted	Name	Years	Games	Goals	Inducted
Graham Arthur	1955–1968	232	201	1996	Albert Chadwick	1929	17	8	1996
**Peter Hudson**	1967–1974; 1977	129	727	1996	Peter Knights	1969–1985	264	201	1996
**Leigh Matthews**	1969–1985	332	915	1996	Dan Minogue	1926	1	2	1996
Michael Tuck	1971–1991	426	320	1996	Gary Ayres	1978–1993	269	70	1999
Dermott Brereton	1982–1992	189	427	1999	Don Scott	1967–1981	302	133	2001
**Jason Dunstall**	1985–1998	269	1,254	2002	John Platten	1986–1998	258	228	2003
Gary Ablett Sr.	1981–1983	6	10	2005	Kelvin Moore	1970–1984	300	21	2005
Robert DiPierdomenico	1975–1991	240	130	2007	Darren Jarman	1991–1995	109	122	2007
Chris Langford	1983–1997	300	33	2009	Shane Crawford	1992–2008	305	224	2012
Rick Davies	1981	20	37	2013	Paul Salmon	1996–2000	100	41	2016
Terry Wallace	1978–1986	174	96	2018	Sam Mitchell	2002–2016	307	67	2023
Luke Hodge	2002–2017	305	193	2025					
Coaches
Name	Years	Games	Wins	Inducted	Name	Years	Games	Wins	Inducted
Allan Jeans	1981–1987; 1989–1990	221	159	1996	**John Kennedy Sr.**	1957; 1960–1963; 1967–1976	299	181	1996
David Parkin	1977–1980	94	57	2002					

=== Hawthorn Football Club Hall of Fame ===
The following is a list of everyone who has been inducted into the club's Hall of Fame.

Bold indicates legend status.

- Alec Albiston
- **Graham Arthur**
- Gary Ayres
- Dermott Brereton
- Gary Buckenara
- Brian Coleman
- Andrew Collins
- Ron Cook
- Shane Crawford
- Peter Crimmins
- Ian Dicker
- Robert DiPierdomenico
- **Jason Dunstall**
- Rodney Eade
- Brendan Edwards
- Max Elmer
- Dr. A.S. Ferguson
- Ken Goddard
- Russell Greene
- Peter Haby
- Jack Hale
- Luke Hodge
- **Peter Hudson**
- Bert Hyde
- **Allan Jeans**
- Dr. J. Jona
- Brian Kann
- John Kennedy Jr.
- **John Kennedy Sr.**
- J.W. Kennon
- **Peter Knights**
- Chris Langford
- Ian Law
- Alan Martello
- **Leigh Matthews**
- Chris Mew
- Harry E. Miller
- Bert Mills
- Sam Mitchell
- Michael Moncrieff
- Kelvin Moore
- John O'Mahony
- **David Parkin**
- John Peck
- John Platten
- Ted Pool
- Darrin Pritchard
- Jarryd Roughead
- Phil Ryan
- Peter Schwab
- **Don Scott**
- Bob Sellers
- Roy Simmonds
- Stan Spinks
- **Michael Tuck**
- Ern Utting
- Terry Wallace
- W. 'Beau' Wallace

== Home grounds and training and administrative base ==
During the history of the Hawthorn Football Club, the club has had four mainstay home grounds (Glenferrie Oval, Princes Park, Waverley Park and the Melbourne Cricket Ground). Prior to adopting Glenferrie Oval as the club's traditional home the club had a nomadic history, playing home games at whatever the most suitable obtainable ground was for that season. Their first home ground, the Hawthorn C.G. (West Hawthorn Reserve) was abandoned after the first season due to conditions imposed by the Hawthorn Cricket Club and they played at John Wren's Richmond Racecourse in 1903 (which was off Bridge Road between Stawell Street and Westbank Terrace—where Tudor Street with 5 no through streets are now located) and moved to the Richmond Cricket Ground in 1904. Their merger with Boroondara in 1905 had them move to Boroondara's ground, which at the time was the East Melbourne Cricket Ground. Hawthorn dropped their colours of blue and red (similar to Melbourne's guernsey at the time) and adopted Boroondara's colours, which was a black guernsey with red sash but retained the name Hawthorn FC. When the Hawthorn council opened the Hawthorn City Sports Ground (Glenferrie Oval) in October 1905 they endeavored to get a senior club to represent the district to be the main tenant during the next football season. The Hawthorn FC, competing in the Metropolitan Junior Football Association (now known as the VAFA), and Hawthorn Rovers (a popular club in the Eastern Suburbs Association) merged to form the Hawthorn City Football Club and made Glenferrie their home ground (the word City was later dropped and the club was just known as the Hawthorn Football Club when it entered the VFA in 1914) .

=== Glenferrie Oval: (Home and Away games 1906–1973), (Training and administrative base 1906–2006) ===
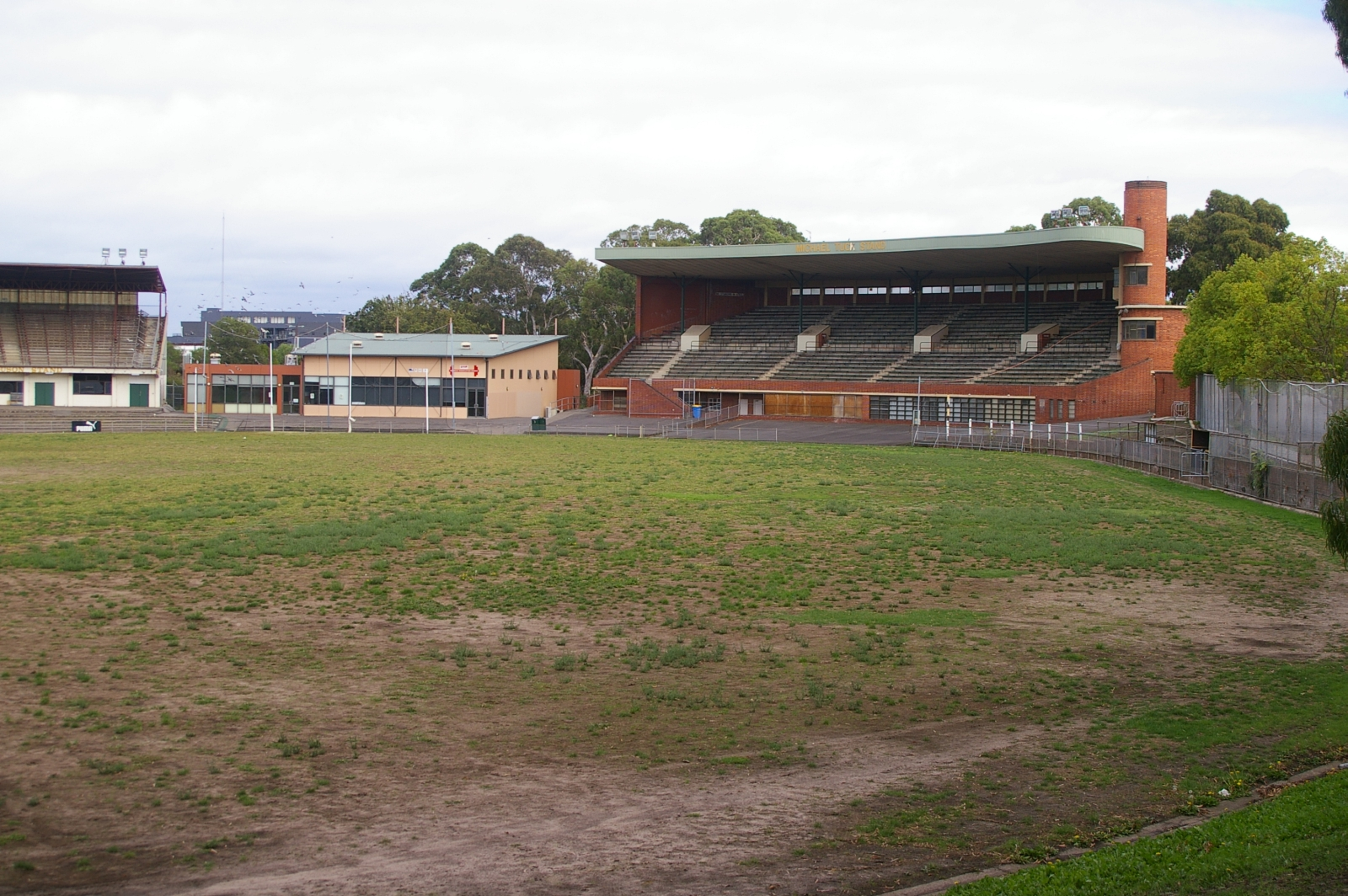
Glenferrie Oval is the spiritual home of the Hawks; however, the last VFL/AFL match was played back in 1973

Between 1906 and 1973, home games were played at the club's traditional home, Glenferrie Oval, in the heart of the affluent suburb. The state of Glenferrie Oval and its location, close to Glenferrie train station on the Melbourne East route, was a central reason why the club was first accepted into the VFA in 1914, and then the VFL in 1925. The club's on-field results had not reached any great heights in those early days but both the VFA and VFL had recognised the importance of representation in the suburbs east of the Yarra River. Glenferrie Oval was pivotal in these advancements of the Hawthorn Football Club as it was considered the most suitable at the time.

In 1914, when Hawthorn entered the VFA, the council was required to build a new dressing shed to meet the standards of the VFA competition. These dressing sheds were erected in the north-west corner of the ground, where the Tuck Stand now resides, and were later moved to the Rathmines Road Reserve in Hawthorn where it still exists today. In 1922 the ground was widened by 30 yards and lengthened westward by 50 yards – taking in the previous outer reserve ground – to the dimensions that remain today. The 1922 ground improvements also resulted in Glenferrie Oval's first main stand, which was a wooden structure to be known as the Kennon-Owen Stand and had been purchased from the East Melbourne Cricket Ground in late 1921 when that ground was closed due to expansion of the Jolimont railyards. The Kennon-Owen Stand was located where the Victorian Weightlifting Building is now situated. Glenferrie Oval is universally known for its famous art-deco Grandstand, built in 1937 and later named the Michael Tuck stand after the club great, and housed the new changerooms and administration of the club. It is now heritage protected as one of the most significant buildings of the era. The Kennon-Owen Stand was replaced by the Dr A S Ferguson Stand, a new brick stand opened in 1966 which was 185 feet long and could seat 1450, with 400 undercover. It was later to be home of the Past Players Association and the original museum. The northern part of the Ferguson stand was demolished to make way for the Victorian Weightlifting Building. In 1963, the large scoreboard was erected at the eastern end of the ground. After the club won the 1961 premiership it was decided to buy some houses on the other side of Linda Crescent to build the Social Club which opened in 1962. The ground was relatively small by VFL standards, but the intimate nature of the ground (with the grandstands and train line surrounding the ground) made for a terrific atmosphere.

The club ceased playing VFL matches at the ground in 1973 to cater to the club's growing crowds and demands of VFL football. From 1974 to 2006, the club used the ground as a home and administration base, conducting training sessions and running a social club, across Linda Crescent, before moving the administrative base to Waverley Park in 2006. The club used Glenferrie Oval for its post-premiership celebrations in 2008, attracting more than 20,000 fans.

=== Princes Park: 1974–1991 ===
The decision to move away from Glenferrie Oval and subsequent move to Princes Park, was a difficult transition, alienating many supporters. Prior to moving to Princes Park, the club pushed to build a stadium in Box Hill and mooted a move to the MCG (1964) both were rejected. The move to Princes Park—the traditional home of the Carlton Football Club, coincided with the club's golden era, hoisting the '76, '78, '83, '86, '88, '89 and '91 premiership flags at the ground. Combined with Carlton's '79, '81, '82 and '87 flags, Princes Park became a hub of success throughout the 1970s and 1980s. Whilst the club had immense success at the ground, the ground wasn't a favourite with the majority of the Hawthorn membership. Located in Melbourne's Northern suburbs, the traditional home of the Carlton Football Club—one of the traditional powerhouses of the VFL, the move away from the club's heartland caused many Hawks supporters to turn their back on the club. Recognising this, as early as the mid-1980s the Hawthorn administration pushed to relocate from Princes Park to Waverley Park; however, due to the nature of long-term terms of tenancy at Princes Park and the ruthlessness of the Carlton Football Club for Hawthorn to abide by this contract, a move away from Princes Park before the end of the long-term agreement would result in financial ruin for the club.

=== Waverley Park: (Home and Away Games 1992–1999), (Training and administrative base 2006–2025) ===
In 1990, with the backing of the AFL, Hawthorn set the wheels in motion for a move to VFL Park, playing a series of home games at Waverley Park—located 20 kilometres or 12 miles east of the Melbourne CBD and the location of Hawthorn's 1991 Premiership success. Whilst the move to Waverley was met with a drop in on-field success, symbolising the birth of the barren period for the club on the field leading up until 2008, the club successfully harboured large increases in attendances and membership at the ground. As a result of the AFL closing the venue and subsequently selling the property to Mirvac to finance the Docklands stadia, the club had the opportunity to move home games to either the lavish new Docklands precinct (alongside Essendon, St Kilda, Western Bulldogs and North Melbourne) or join traditional tenants Melbourne and Richmond as well as Collingwood at the MCG. Highlighting the potential to push attendances and membership beyond 50,000, the club decided to push for relocation to the MCG in line with the 'Family Club' mantra. In January 2006, in the club's centennial year at Glenferrie Oval, the club's administration, museum, player base and training base relocated to Waverley Park.

=== Melbourne Cricket Ground: 2000–present ===
On 13 March 2000, Hawthorn played its first home game as an MCG tenant against Collingwood, becoming one of four tenant clubs to play at the ground. Until 2008 the shift from to the MCG has been met with a barren period on the field for the Hawks, having played in five out of nine non-finals seasons at the ground. Since 2000, Hawthorn has played between seven and nine home games at the MCG, with secondary home games being played at Docklands Stadium and York Park in Tasmania. In 2008, Hawthorn played seven home games at the MCG, drawing 369,614 (52,802) to seven games and a total of 773,089 (59,468) to 13 games at the venue for the year.

=== York Park: 2001–present ===
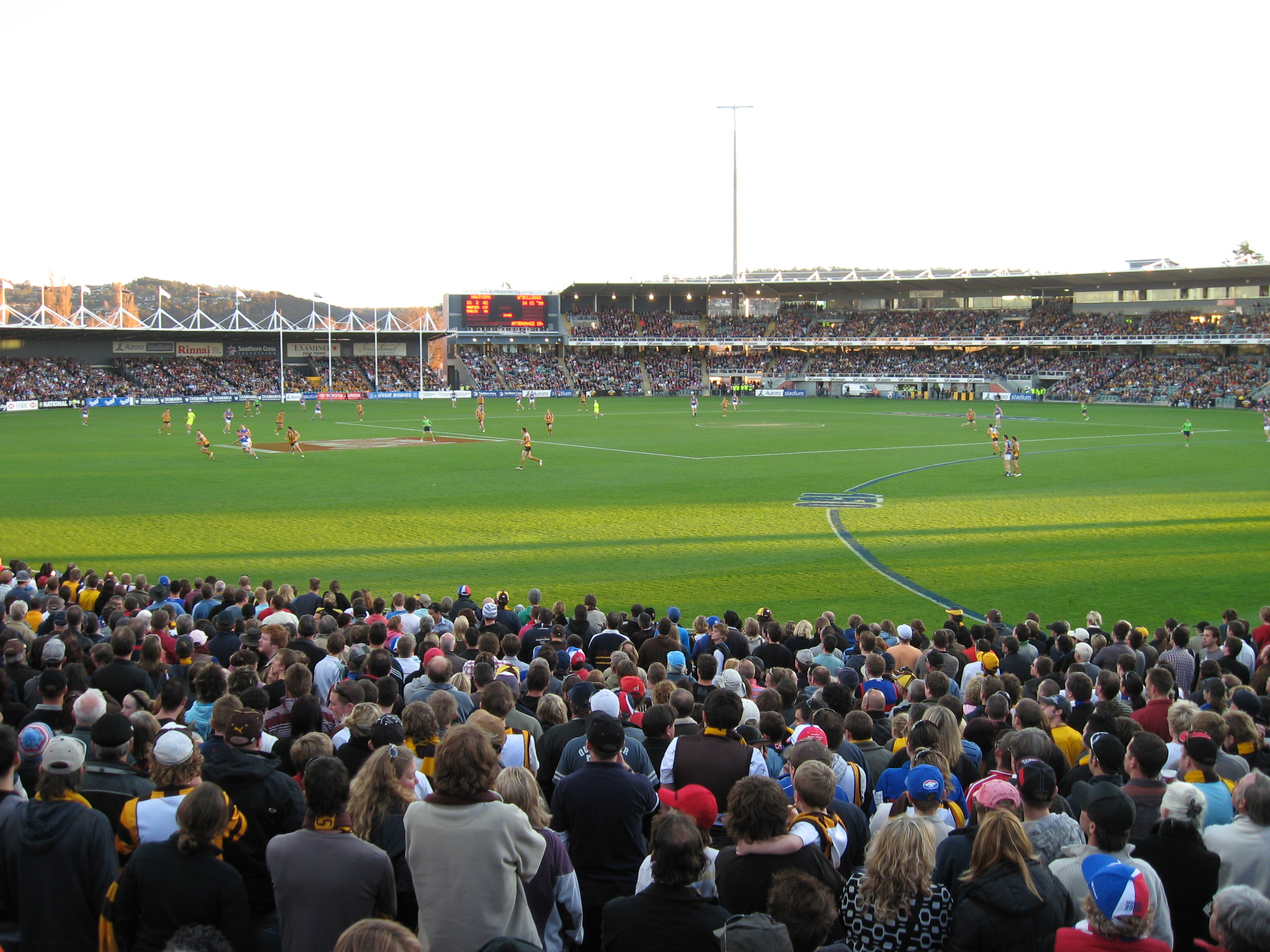
York Park is Hawthorn's second home ground

Since 2001, Hawthorn's has played "secondary" home games at York Park (currently also known by the sponsorship name of The University of Tasmania Stadium) in Tasmania. The Hawks have a successful record at the ground, winning 45 times and losing only 13 and a draw since games started playing there in 2001. As a result of the agreement with the Tasmanian government, thousands of Melbourne-based Hawthorn supporters have travelled to Tasmania to watch the Hawks play, increasing activity within the local Launceston economy. By the same token, Hawthorn has successfully increased its following in the state, with an estimated 25% of young Tasmanian supporters now barracking for their "local" team.

== VFL Women's ==
Victorian Women's Football League which was the major women's competition in Victoria had in 2016 been reorganized and now came under the VFL brand, local club Knox Falcons contested in 2016. Hawthorn obtained a licence from the Knox Falcons and transferred it to its senior VFL-affiliate Box Hill. The team won three games in the 2017 season. In December 2017 the announcement that the Box Hill Hawks' VFLW women's side has been re-licensed and will be now known as Hawthorn.

2018 VFLW Grand Final	G	B	Total
Hawthorn	4	6	30
Geelong	2	5	17
Venue: Etihad Stadium	Crowd: 10,000 est.

The VFLW team will play before the Box Hill men's team on most occasions, with their home ground the Box Hill City Oval. It provides Hawthorn fans an opportunity to support both sides every home game.

In 2018 the Hawthorn women team won the 2018 VFLW premiership defeating Geelong 4.6.30 to 2.5.17. Defender Chantella Perera was awarded the Lisa Hardeman Medal as best afield in the Grand Final.

Club President Jeff Kennett wrote, Hawthorn is committed to women's football. While the AFL have not yet given us an entry date, I trust after this year's performance we have earnt the right to be elevated into the AFLW competition in 2020.

For a list of the VFLW team's coaches, captains and performances in the competition click "here". Archived from the original on 17 March 2021.. For the 2021 season, the coach is Bec Goddard and the captain is Jess Trend.

== Reserves team ==
Hawthorn

Names
- Full name: Hawthorn Football Club Limited

1999 season
- Home-and-away season: 10th

Club details
- Founded: 1924
- Dissolved: 1999
- Competition: AFL reserves
- Premierships: VFL/AFL reserves (8): 1958; 1959; 1972; 1985; 2001; 2013; 2018; 2026
- Ground: Waverley Park
- Former ground: Princes Park

Uniforms
Home

The Hawthorn reserves were the reserves side of the club, competing in the AFL reserves until the competition disbanded.

Since 2000, Hawthorn has been affiliated with the Box Hill Football Club in the Victorian Football League.

=== History ===
Hawthorn's first reserves side was fielded in 1924 in Division 2 of the Victorian Junior Football Association (VJFA), with the team known as the Hawthorn Junior Football Club. The club defeated North Melbourne in the semi-final AND again in the challenge final. They were defeated by Division 1 minor premiers South Melbourne District in the grand final.

Hawthorn first fielded a side in the VFL seconds in 1925, the same year they entered the VFL.

The reserve team's first flag was won in 1958, when they held onto a winning lead by defeating Collingwood by four points. Gary Young kicked four goals, while Elward kicked two. Horace Edmonds was the coach.

In 1959, the reserves side went back-to-back after defeating Fitzroy by 31 points.

The side's third premiership came in 1972, with a team that contained four of the previous years senior premiership players, Geoff Angus, Ken Beck, Michael Porter and Ray Wilson. Up and coming future club champions Michael Moncrieff, Michael Tuck, Kelvin Matthews and Alan Goad were instrumental in the match. The Hawks led all day before Melbourne hit the front with two minutes to go, a late goal to Fitzgerald won the game. Wayne Bevan kicked 4 goals for the winners.

In 1985, the reserves team's fourth and final premiership contained future premiership players in James Morrissey, Greg Dear, Peter Curran, Chris Wittman and Paul Abbott, as well as Hawthorn veterans Peter Knights, Gary Buckenara, Rodney Eade and Colin Robertson, and in his only year at the club, Steve Malaxos. Buckenara kicked 8 goals.

The reserves side's last grand final appearance came in 1997, when the side were defeated by Richmond by 44 points.

Starting in 2000, Hawthorn has been affiliated with the Box Hill Football Club in the Victorian Football League. Under the affiliation, Hawthorn players who are not selected in the AFL can play alongside Box Hill senior players in the VFL competition. The clubs have a strong affiliation, with Box Hill changing its club nickname from Mustangs to Hawks when the sides affiliated. Box Hill has won four premierships since the affiliation began (2001, 2013, 2018 and 2026).

== Under-19s ==
=== 1972 ===
1972 VFL Grand Final Under-19s	G	B	Total
Hawthorn	13	23	101
North Melbourne	13	20	98
Venue: Melbourne Cricket Ground

Hawthorn fielded a side in the VFL Under-19s competition. The Under-19s played in two grand finals, losing the first in 1969 to Richmond but in 1972 won against North Melbourne. The team included Bernie Jones, Ron Beattie, Michael Zemski and Ian Scrimshaw.

== Under-17s ==
1970 SESFL Grand Final Under-17s	G	B	Total
Hawthorn	17	14	116
East Brighton	9	11	65
Venue: Princes Park Caulfield

For a few years Hawthorn had an Under-17s team that played in the local suburban competition. The team played in the Melbourne Boys League until 1968 before transferring to the South East Suburban FL from 1969 to 1973. The 1970 Premiership side included Bernie Jones, Paul Reinmuth and Wayne Bevan whom made the senior ranks. A proposal was made in 1973 for the formation of an Under-17s competition including all VFL clubs, but it never got enough support for it to get off the ground. Robert DiPierdomenico was the only player to make the senior ranks.

1972 SESFL Grand Final Under-17s	G	B	Total
Hawthorn	20	21	141
St Kilda City	6	8	44
Venue: Princes Park Caulfield

The Under-17s won three Premierships in a row from 1960 to 1962. These teams produced additional Under-17s players to play for the 1st 18: David Albiston, Neil Ferguson and Percy Cummings. Another U17s player from that era was Alan Piper, who was a hugely respected businessman and football visionary who played a pivotal role in the establishment of AFL football in Queensland via the Brisbane Bears in 1987, and the club's relocation from the Gold Coast to Brisbane in 1993. Piper died at age 55 in 2001.

== Other teams ==
Hawthorn has one team in the Victorian Blind Football League as of 2024, which previously existed from 2019 until 2022. The side won the 2019 premiership by 7 points.

In 2023, Hawthorn had two seats in the competition—Hawthorn Gold and Hawthorn Brown—which both entered the competition in 2023. Brown defeated Gold in the 2023 Grand Final, however both teams ceased to exist in 2024 (in favour of a single Hawthorn team) after VFL club Port Melbourne joined the VBFL.

== See also ==
- Melbourne Hawks
- Sport in Australia
- Sport in Victoria
- List of Hawthorn Football Club players
