= Roy Simmonds =

Australian rules footballer and coach

- Roy Simmonds in 1961

Personal information
- Full name: Roy Alexander Simmonds
- Born: 29 December 1928
- Died: 9 August 2008 (aged 79); Melbourne
- Original team: Cohuna
- Height: 175 cm (5 ft 9 in)
- Weight: 80 kg (176 lb)

Playing career^{1}
Years	Club	Games (Goals)
1950–1961	Hawthorn	192 (78)

Coaching career
Years	Club	Games (W–L–D)
1973	Hawthorn	1 (0–1–0)
- ^{1} Playing statistics correct to the end of 1961.

Career highlights
- Hawthorn best and fairest: 1956; Hawthorn Team of the Century

Roy Alexander Simmonds (29 December 1928 – 9 August 2008) was an Australian rules footballer who played with Hawthorn in the VFL during the 1950s.

Simmonds was used all around the ground by Hawthorn, most often though on the half back flank. His finest season came in 1956 where he won Hawthorn's best and fairest and finished equal fourth in the Brownlow Medal count. He represented Victoria at the 1956 Perth interstate football carnival.

His career ended when he was controversially omitted from the 1961 Grand Final.

Simmonds coached Hawthorn for one game in 1973 as regular coach John Kennedy was coaching the Victorian State team.

In 2003 he was chosen on the interchange bench in Hawthorn's official 'Team of the Century'.

He worked as a grounds maintenance worker at East Doncaster Secondary in his later life, for a total of fourteen years. On 9 August 2008, Simmonds died from cancer.

== Honours and achievements ==
Individual

- Hawthorn best and fairest: 1956
- Hawthorn life member
- Hawthorn Team of the Century
