= 1978 VFL Night Series =

VFL Amco-Herald Cup

Tournament details
- Dates: 3 March – 20 June 1978
- Teams: 13
- Venue: 1 (in 1 host city)

Final positions
- Champions: Fitzroy (2nd title)
- Runners-up: North Melbourne

Tournament statistics
- Matches played: 13
- Attendance: 156,714 (12,055 per match)

The 1978 Victorian Football League Night Series was the 18th edition of the VFL Night Series, a VFL-organised national club Australian rules football tournament between the clubs from the VFL and Tasmania.

== Qualified Teams ==
Team	Nickname	League	Qualification	Participation (bold indicates winners)
North Melbourne	Kangaroos	VFL	Winner of the 1977 Victorian Football League	17th (Previous: 1956, 1957, 1959, 1960, 1961, 1962, 1963, 1964, **1965**, **1966**, 1967, 1968, 1969, 1970, 1971, 1977)
Collingwood	Magpies	VFL	Runners-Up in the 1977 Victorian Football League	7th (Previous: 1957, 1961, 1962, 1963, 1968, 1977)
Hawthorn	Hawks	VFL	Third Place in the 1977 Victorian Football League	15th (Previous: 1956, 1957, 1958, 1959, 1960, 1962, 1964, 1965, 1966, 1967, **1968**, **1969**, 1970, **1977**)
Richmond	Tigers	VFL	Fourth Place in the 1977 Victorian Football League	15th (Previous: 1956, 1957, 1958, 1959, 1960, 1961, **1962**, 1963, 1964, 1965, 1966, 1968, 1970, 1977)
South Melbourne	Swans	VFL	Fifth Place in the 1977 Victorian Football League	17th (Previous: **1956**, **1957**, 1958, 1959, **1960**, 1961, 1962, 1963, 1964, 1965, 1966, 1967, 1968, 1969, 1971, 1977)
Carlton	Blues	VFL	Sixth Place in the 1977 Victorian Football League	12th (Previous: 1956, 1957, 1958, 1960, 1961, 1963, 1964, 1965, 1966, 1971, 1977)
Footscray	Bulldogs	VFL	Seventh Place in the 1977 Victorian Football League	16th (Previous: 1957, 1958, 1959, 1960, 1962, **1963**, **1964**, 1965, 1966, **1967**, 1968, 1969, **1970**, 1971, 1977)
Geelong	Cats	VFL	Eighth Place in the 1977 Victorian Football League	9th (Previous: 1957, 1958, 1959, 1960, **1961**, 1970, 1971, 1977)
Essendon	Bombers	VFL	Ninth Place in the 1977 Victorian Football League	11th (Previous: 1956, 1957, 1958, 1961, 1963, 1967, 1969, 1970, 1971, 1977)
Fitzroy	Lions	VFL	Tenth Place in the 1977 Victorian Football League	16th (Previous: 1956, 1957, **1959**, 1961, 1962, 1963, 1964, 1965, 1966, 1967, 1968, 1969, 1970, 1971, 1977)
Melbourne	Demons	VFL	Eleventh Place in the 1977 Victorian Football League	10th (Previous: 1957, 1965, 1966, 1967, 1968, 1969, 1970, **1971**, 1977)
St Kilda	Saints	VFL	Twelfth Place in the 1977 Victorian Football League	11th (Previous: 1956, 1957, **1958**, 1959, 1960, 1962, 1964, 1967, 1969, 1977)
Tasmania	Devils	TANFL	State Representative Team	1st

== Venues ==
Melbourne
Waverley Park
Capacity: 72,000
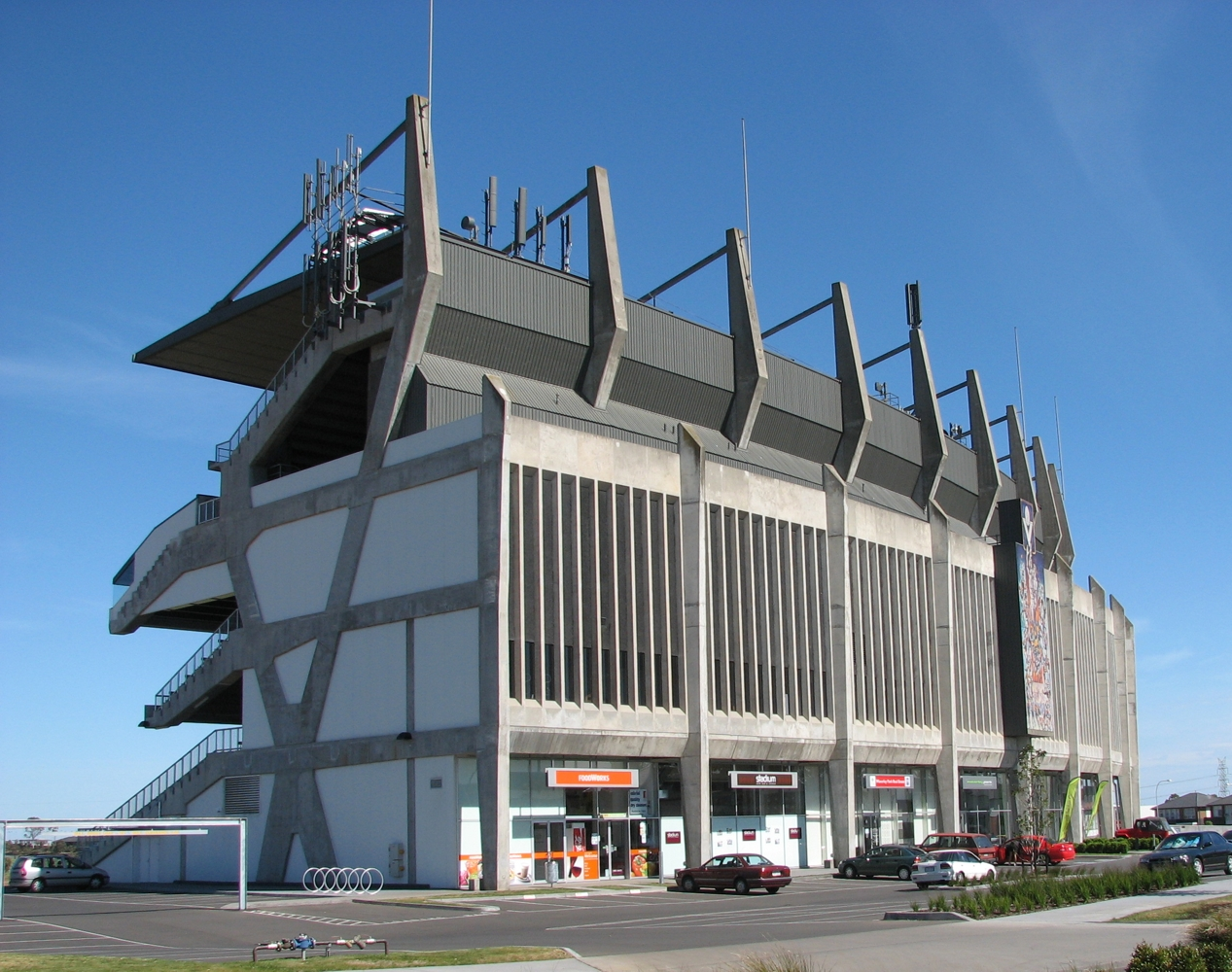

== Knockout stage ==
=== Round 1 ===
3 March 1978	South Melbourne	126–68	Collingwood	Waverley Park, Melbourne
	19.12 (126)		10.8 (68)	Attendance: 18,585

10 March 1978	North Melbourne	80–63	Footscray	Waverley Park, Melbourne
	11.14 (80)		9.9 (63)	Attendance: 10,136

17 March 1978	Carlton	63–62	Geelong	Waverley Park, Melbourne
	8.15 (63)		8.14 (62)	Attendance: 10,321

23 March 1978	Fitzroy	88–70	Tasmania	Waverley Park, Melbourne
	13.10 (88)		10.10 (70)	Attendance: 5,136

4 April 1978	Richmond	88–37	Essendon	Waverley Park, Melbourne
	13.10 (88)		5.7 (37)	Attendance: 15,764

11 April 1978	St Kilda	96–57	Melbourne	Waverley Park, Melbourne
	14.12 (96)		8.9 (57)	Attendance: 8,867

=== Quarter-finals ===
QF #1 18 April 1978	Fitzroy	92–68	South Melbourne	Waverley Park, Melbourne
	14.8 (92)		9.14 (68)	Attendance: 5,822

QF #2 2 May 1978	Richmond	100–83	Carlton	Waverley Park, Melbourne
	15.10 (100)		11.17 (83)	Attendance: 12,061

QF #3 9 May 1978	Geelong	67–36	Hawthorn	Waverley Park, Melbourne
	10.7 (67)		5.6 (36)	Attendance: 8,146

QF #4 16 May 1978	North Melbourne	60–56	St Kilda	Waverley Park, Melbourne
	8.12 (60)		8.8 (56)	Attendance: 20,694

=== Semi-finals ===
SF #1 23 May 1978	Fitzroy	74–58	Richmond	Waverley Park, Melbourne
	10.14 (74)		8.10 (58)	Attendance: 8,172

SF #2 30 May 1978	North Melbourne	98–59	Geelong	Waverley Park, Melbourne
	15.8 (98)		9.5 (59)	Attendance: 6,590

=== Victorian Football League Night Series final ===
Final 20 June 1978	Fitzroy	96–20	North Melbourne	Waverley Park, Melbourne
	2.3 (15); 3.5 (23); 10.13 (73); 13.18 (96)		2.1 (13); 2.5 (17); 2.6 (18); 2.8 (20)	Attendance: 26,420; Umpires: Deller, K.Smith
		Goals
	Beecroft 3 McCarthy, McMahon 2 Quinlan, Irwin, Walls, Conlan, Padley, Thompson 1		Blight, Schimmelbusch 1
