= 1977 VFL Night Series =

VFL Amco-Herald Cup

Tournament details
- Dates: 3 May – 2 August 1977
- Teams: 12
- Venue: 2 (in 1 host city)

Final positions
- Champions: Hawthorn (3rd title)
- Runners-up: Carlton

Tournament statistics
- Matches played: 13
- Attendance: 99,819 (7,678 per match)

The 1977 Victorian Football League Night Series was the 17th edition of the VFL Night Series, a VFL-organised national club Australian rules football tournament between the clubs from the VFL.

The 1977 Series would be the first night series to be played since 1971 but unlike the previous version that had been run between 1956 and 1971 as a consolation tournament that featuring the eight teams that missed the VFL finals and was played in September & October. This version was to feature all 12 VFL clubs and was played mid-week throughout the VFL premiership season between May and August.

== Qualified Teams ==
Team	Nickname	League	Qualification	Participation (bold indicates winners)
Hawthorn	Hawks	VFL	Winners of the 1976 Victorian Football League	14th (Previous: 1956, 1957, 1958, 1959, 1960, 1962, 1964, 1965, 1966, 1967, **1968**, **1969**, 1970)
North Melbourne	Kangaroos	VFL	Runners-Up in the 1976 Victorian Football League	16th (Previous: 1956, 1957, 1959, 1960, 1961, 1962, 1963, 1964, **1965**, **1966**, 1967, 1968, 1969, 1970, 1971)
Carlton	Blues	VFL	Third Place in the 1976 Victorian Football League	11th (Previous: 1956, 1957, 1958, 1960, 1961, 1963, 1964, 1965, 1966, 1971)
Geelong	Cats	VFL	Fourth Place in the 1976 Victorian Football League	8th (Previous: 1957, 1958, 1959, 1960, **1961**, 1970, 1971)
Footscray	Bulldogs	VFL	Fifth Place in the 1976 Victorian Football League	15th (Previous: 1957, 1958, 1959, 1960, 1962, **1963**, **1964**, 1965, 1966, **1967**, 1968, 1969, **1970**, 1971)
Melbourne	Demons	VFL	Sixth Place in the 1976 Victorian Football League	9th (Previous: 1957, 1965, 1966, 1967, 1968, 1969, 1970, **1971**)
Richmond	Tigers	VFL	Seventh Place in the 1976 Victorian Football League	14th (Previous: 1956, 1957, 1958, 1959, 1960, 1961, **1962**, 1963, 1964, 1965, 1966, 1968, 1970)
South Melbourne	Swans	VFL	Eighth Place in the 1976 Victorian Football League	16th (Previous: **1956**, **1957**, 1958, 1959, **1960**, 1961, 1962, 1963, 1964, 1965, 1966, 1967, 1968, 1969, 1971)
St Kilda	Saints	VFL	Ninth Place in the 1976 Victorian Football League	10th (Previous: 1956, 1957, **1958**, 1959, 1960, 1962, 1964, 1967, 1969)
Essendon	Bombers	VFL	Tenth Place in the 1976 Victorian Football League	10th (Previous: 1956, 1957, 1958, 1961, 1963, 1967, 1969, 1970, 1971)
Fitzroy	Lions	VFL	Eleventh Place in the 1976 Victorian Football League	15th (Previous: 1956, 1957, **1959**, 1961, 1962, 1963, 1964, 1965, 1966, 1967, 1968, 1969, 1970, 1971)
Collingwood	Magpies	VFL	Twelfth Place in the 1976 Victorian Football League	6th (Previous: 1957, 1961, 1962, 1963, 1968)

== Venues ==
Melbourne
Waverley Park	Lake Oval
Capacity: 72,000	Capacity: 20,000

== Knockout stage ==
=== Round 1 ===
3 May 1977	Richmond	128–72	Collingwood	Lake Oval, Melbourne
	19.14 (128)		9.18 (72)	Attendance: 4,805

10 May 1977	Carlton	89–79	St Kilda	Lake Oval, Melbourne
	12.17 (89)		10.19 (79)	Attendance: 4,118

17 May 1977	Fitzroy	108–74	North Melbourne	Waverley Park, Melbourne
	16.12 (108)		11.8 (74)	Attendance: 8,468

24 May 1977	South Melbourne	104–57	Footscray	Waverley Park, Melbourne
	15.14 (104)		8.9 (57)	Attendance: 3,475

31 May 1977	Hawthorn	84–42	Geelong	Waverley Park, Melbourne
	13.6 (84)		6.6 (42)	Attendance: 2,743

7 June 1977	Melbourne	71–30	Essendon	Waverley Park, Melbourne
	10.11 (71)		5.9 (39)	Attendance: 10,036

=== Quarter-finals ===
QF #1 21 June 1977	St Kilda	128–86	South Melbourne	Waverley Park, Melbourne
	19.14 (128)		12.14 (86)	Attendance: 5,123

QF #2 28 June 1977	Hawthorn	52–41	North Melbourne	Waverley Park, Melbourne
	7.10 (52)		5.11 (41)	Attendance: 3,346

QF #3 5 July 1977	Carlton	103–81	Melbourne	Waverley Park, Melbourne
	15.13 (103)		11.15 (81)	Attendance: 6,841

QF #4 12 July 1977	Richmond	101–71	Fitzroy	Waverley Park, Melbourne
	15.11 (101)		10.11 (71)	Attendance: 8,169

=== Semi-finals ===
SF #1 19 July 1977	Hawthorn	99–75	St Kilda	Waverley Park, Melbourne
	14.15 (99)		10.15 (75)	Attendance: 9,232

SF #2 26 July 1977	Carlton	49–30	Richmond	Waverley Park, Melbourne
	6.13 (49)		4.6 (30)	Attendance: 6,056

=== Victorian Football League Night Series final ===
Final 2 August 1977	Hawthorn	95–71	Carlton	Waverley Park, Melbourne
	3.7 (25); 6.8 (44); 10.11 (71); 14.11 (95)		5.1 (31); 7.3 (45); 9.3 (57); 11.5 (71)	Attendance: 27,407; Umpires: Deller, Robinson
		Goals
	Hudson 5 Rowlings, Martello 2 G.Ablett, Hendrie, Bennett, Tuck, Matthews 1		Ashman 3 Sheldon, Walls 2 Buckley, Keogh, McKenna, Armstrong 1
