= 1960 Hawthorn Football Club season =

36th season in the Victorian Football League

Hawthorn Football Club
1960 season
- President: Dr. A.S. Ferguson
- Coach: John Kennedy Sr.
- Captain: Graham Arthur
- Home ground: Glenferrie Oval
- Night series: Runner-up
- VFL season: 11–7 (5th)
- Finals series: Did not qualify
- Best and fairest: Brendan Edwards
- Leading goalkicker: Garry Young (36)
- Highest home attendance: 30,000 (Round 2 vs. Collingwood)
- Lowest home attendance: 12,000 (Round 8 vs. Richmond)
- Average home attendance: 17,500

The 1960 season was the Hawthorn Football Club's 36th season in the Victorian Football League and 59th overall.

== Fixture ==
=== Night Series ===
Rd	Date and local time	Opponent	Scores (Hawthorn's scores indicated in bold)			Venue	Attendance
Rd	Date and local time	Opponent	Home	Away	Result	Venue	Attendance
1	Thursday, 1 September	North Melbourne	**17.21 (123)**	9.7 (61)	Won by 62 points	Lake Oval	9,800
Semi-final	Thursday, 15 September	Geelong	**14.20 (104)**	6.8 (44)	Won by 60 points	Lake Oval	14,500
Final	Tuesday, 27 September	South Melbourne	10.12 (72)	**8.11 (59)**	Lost by 13 points	Lake Oval	20,000

=== Premiership Season ===
Rd	Date and local time	Opponent	Scores (Hawthorn's scores indicated in bold)			Venue	Attendance	Record
Rd	Date and local time	Opponent	Home	Away	Result	Venue	Attendance	Record
1	Saturday, 16 April (2:20 pm)	Essendon	12.21 (93)	**9.12 (66)**	Lost by 27 points	Windy Hill (A)	23,000	0–1
2	Saturday, 30 April (2:20 pm)	Collingwood	**6.16 (52)**	7.13 (55)	Lost by 3 points	Glenferrie Oval (H)	30,000	0–2
3	Saturday, 7 May (2:20 pm)	Footscray	**6.9 (45)**	6.17 (53)	Lost by 8 points	Glenferrie Oval (H)	16,000	0–3
4	Saturday, 14 May (2:20 pm)	Carlton	5.18 (48)	**5.7 (37)**	Lost by 11 points	Princes Park (A)	11,066	0–4
5	Saturday, 21 May (2:20 pm)	Melbourne	**5.7 (37)**	7.15 (57)	Lost by 20 points	Glenferrie Oval (H)	12,500	0–5
6	Saturday, 28 May (2:20 pm)	North Melbourne	7.6 (48)	**9.8 (62)**	Won by 14 points	Arden Street Oval (A)	8,600	1–5
7	Saturday, 4 June (2:20 pm)	Geelong	**14.15 (99)**	14.13 (97)	Won by 2 points	Glenferrie Oval (H)	16,500	2–5
8	Saturday, 11 June (2:20 pm)	Richmond	**13.18 (96)**	11.15 (81)	Won by 15 points	Glenferrie Oval (H)	12,000	3–5
9	Saturday, 18 June (2:20 pm)	St Kilda	7.13 (55)	**8.19 (67)**	Won by 12 points	Junction Oval (A)	23,900	4–5
10	Saturday, 25 June (2:20 pm)	South Melbourne	11.7 (73)	**13.6 (84)**	Won by 11 points	Lake Oval (A)	22,300	5–5
11	Saturday, 9 July (2:20 pm)	Fitzroy	**10.9 (69)**	12.14 (86)	Lost by 17 points	Glenferrie Oval (H)	18,000	5–6
12	Saturday, 16 July (2:20 pm)	Essendon	**10.13 (73)**	16.11 (107)	Lost by 34 points	Glenferrie Oval (H)	23,500	5–7
13	Saturday, 23 July (2:20 pm)	Collingwood	7.15 (57)	**7.16 (58)**	Won by 1 point	Victoria Park (A)	18,637	6–7
14	Saturday, 30 July (2:20 pm)	Footscray	5.9 (39)	**9.21 (75)**	Won by 36 points	Western Oval (A)	16,794	7–7
15	Saturday, 6 August (2:20 pm)	Carlton	**13.10 (88)**	9.7 (61)	Won by 27 points	Glenferrie Oval (H)	16,000	8–7
16	Saturday, 13 August (2:20 pm)	Melbourne	9.13 (67)	**11.10 (76)**	Won by 9 points	Melbourne Cricket Ground (A)	24,646	9–7
17	Saturday, 20 August (2:20 pm)	North Melbourne	**9.17 (71)**	8.4 (52)	Won by 19 points	Glenferrie Oval (H)	13,000	10–7
18	Saturday, 27 August (2:20 pm)	Geelong	9.9 (63)	**14.12 (96)**	Won by 33 points	Kardinia Park (A)	14,587	11–7

== Ladder ==
(P)	Premiers
	Qualified for finals

#	Team	P	W	L	D	PF	PA	%	Pts
1	Melbourne (P)	18	14	4	0	1455	1017	143.1	56
2	Fitzroy	18	14	4	0	1332	1184	112.5	56
3	Essendon	18	13	5	0	1506	1204	125.1	52
4	Collingwood	18	11	7	0	1314	1150	114.3	44
5	Hawthorn	18	11	7	0	1251	1192	104.9	44
6	St Kilda	18	9	9	0	1159	1140	101.7	36
7	Carlton	18	8	9	1	1300	1313	99.0	34
8	South Melbourne	18	7	11	0	1304	1413	92.3	28
9	Geelong	18	6	11	1	1311	1373	95.5	26
10	Footscray	18	6	12	0	1065	1178	90.4	24
11	North Melbourne	18	5	13	0	1183	1474	80.3	20
12	Richmond	18	2	14	2	1086	1628	66.7	12

Rules for classification: 1. premiership points; 2. percentage; 3. points for
Average score: 70.7
Source: AFL Tables
