= 1962 Hawthorn Football Club season =

38th season in the Victorian Football League

Hawthorn Football Club
1962 season
- President: Dr. A.S. Ferguson
- Coach: John Kennedy Sr.
- Captain: Graham Arthur
- Home ground: Glenferrie Oval
- Night series: Runner-up
- VFL season: 5–13 (9th)
- Finals series: Did not qualify
- Best and fairest: Graham Arthur
- Leading goalkicker: John Peck (38)
- Highest home attendance: 28,000 (Round 7 vs. St Kilda)
- Lowest home attendance: 9,600 (Round 17 vs. Fitzroy)
- Average home attendance: 19,378

The 1962 season was the Hawthorn Football Club's 38th season in the Victorian Football League and 61st overall. Hawthorn entered the season as the defending VFL premiers.

== Fixture ==
=== Premiership season ===
Rd	Date and local time	Opponent	Scores (Hawthorn's scores indicated in bold)			Venue	Attendance	Record
Rd	Date and local time	Opponent	Home	Away	Result	Venue	Attendance	Record
1	Saturday, 21 April (2:20 pm)	Footscray	12.8 (80)	**6.11 (47)**	Lost by 33 points	Western Oval (A)	30,762	0–1
2	Saturday, 28 April (2:20 pm)	Collingwood	**13.9 (87)**	10.15 (75)	Won by 12 points	Glenferrie Oval (H)	23,500	1–1
3	Saturday, 5 May (2:20 pm)	Geelong	18.10 (118)	**12.7 (79)**	Lost by 39 points	Kardinia Park (A)	25,819	1–2
4	Saturday, 12 May (2:20 pm)	Carlton	**12.6 (78)**	12.19 (91)	Lost by 13 points	Glenferrie Oval (H)	22,300	1–3
5	Saturday, 19 May (2:20 pm)	Richmond	**11.8 (74)**	9.16 (70)	Won by 4 points	Glenferrie Oval (H)	18,000	2–3
6	Saturday, 26 May (2:20 pm)	Fitzroy	11.13 (79)	**8.8 (56)**	Lost by 23 points	Brunswick Street Oval (A)	14,781	2–4
7	Saturday, 4 June (2:20 pm)	St Kilda	**9.8 (62)**	12.22 (94)	Lost by 32 points	Glenferrie Oval (H)	28,000	2–5
8	Saturday, 9 June (2:20 pm)	Essendon	**9.15 (69)**	7.10 (52)	Won by 17 points	Glenferrie Oval (H)	21,000	3–5
9	Saturday, 23 June (2:20 pm)	North Melbourne	10.8 (68)	**10.7 (67)**	Lost by 1 point	Arden Street Oval (A)	8,470	3–6
10	Saturday, 30 June (2:20 pm)	South Melbourne	7.8 (50)	**12.14 (86)**	Won by 36 points	Lake Oval (A)	10,950	4–6
11	Saturday, 7 July (2:20 pm)	Melbourne	**11.14 (80)**	14.12 (96)	Lost by 16 points	Glenferrie Oval (H)	18,000	4–7
12	Saturday, 14 July (2:20 pm)	Footscray	**13.8 (84)**	16.6 (102)	Lost by 18 points	Glenferrie Oval (H)	16,000	4–8
13	Saturday, 21 July (2:20 pm)	Collingwood	15.9 (99)	**9.6 (60)**	Lost by 39 points	Victoria Park (A)	16,848	4–9
14	Saturday, 28 July (2:20 pm)	Geelong	**11.17 (83)**	16.13 (109)	Lost by 26 points	Glenferrie Oval (H)	18,000	4–10
15	Saturday, 4 August (2:20 pm)	Carlton	8.11 (59)	**7.11 (53)**	Lost by 6 points	Princes Park (A)	18,250	4–11
16	Saturday, 11 August (2:20 pm)	Richmond	11.11 (77)	**15.4 (94)**	Won by 17 points	Punt Road Oval (A)	15,992	5–11
17	Saturday, 18 August (2:20 pm)	Fitzroy	**12.11 (83)**	13.13 (91)	Lost by 8 points	Glenferrie Oval (H)	9,600	5–12
18	Saturday, 25 August (2:20 pm)	St Kilda	14.16 (100)	**9.11 (65)**	Lost by 35 points	Junction Oval (A)	17,450	5–13

=== Night series ===
Rd	Date and local time	Opponent	Scores (Hawthorn's scores indicated in bold)			Venue	Attendance
Rd	Date and local time	Opponent	Home	Away	Result	Venue	Attendance
1	Tuesday, 11 September	Footscray	**11.21 (87)**	9.10 (64)	Won by 23 points	Lake Oval	13,560
Semi-Final	Tuesday, 18 September	Collingwood	**18.13 (121)**	7.7 (49)	Won by 72 points	Lake Oval	20,100
Final	Wednesday, 26 September	Richmond	8.16 (64)	**9.6 (60)**	Lost by 4 points	Lake Oval	24,550

== Ladder ==
(P)	Premiers
	Qualified for finals

#	Team	P	W	L	D	PF	PA	%	Pts
1	Essendon (P)	18	16	2	0	1574	1207	130.4	64
2	Geelong	18	14	4	0	1690	1213	139.3	56
3	Melbourne	18	14	4	0	1374	1092	125.8	56
4	Carlton	18	13	5	0	1361	1205	112.9	52
5	Footscray	18	11	7	0	1390	1281	108.5	44
6	St Kilda	18	9	9	0	1379	1267	108.8	36
7	Collingwood	18	9	9	0	1365	1386	98.5	36
8	Richmond	18	5	13	0	1308	1446	90.5	20
9	Hawthorn	18	5	13	0	1307	1510	86.6	20
10	Fitzroy	18	5	13	0	1222	1529	79.9	20
11	North Melbourne	18	4	14	0	1152	1575	73.1	16
12	South Melbourne	18	3	15	0	1193	1604	74.4	12

Rules for classification: 1. premiership points; 2. percentage; 3. points for
Average score: 75.5
Source: AFL Tables
