= 1956 Hawthorn Football Club season =

32nd season in the Victorian Football League

Hawthorn Football Club
1956 season
- President: Dr. A.S. Ferguson
- Coach: Jack Hale
- Captain: John Kennedy Sr.
- Home ground: Glenferrie Oval
- Night series: 1st round
- VFL season: 7–10–1 (7th)
- Finals series: Did not qualify
- Best and fairest: Roy Simmonds
- Leading goalkicker: John Peck (31)
- Highest home attendance: 24,000 (Round 1 vs. Collingwood)
- Lowest home attendance: 11,000 (Round 9 vs. North Melbourne)
- Average home attendance: 16,778

The 1956 season was the Hawthorn Football Club's 32nd season in the Victorian Football League and 55th overall.

== Fixture ==
=== Night Series Cup ===
The night series cup was a knockout tournament contested by the teams who didn't qualify for the finals.

Rd	Date and local time	Opponent	Scores (Hawthorn's scores indicated in bold)			Venue	Attendance
Rd	Date and local time	Opponent	Home	Away	Result	Venue	Attendance
1	Thursday, 30 August	Richmond	12.10 (82)	**9.19 (73)**	Lost by 9 points	Lake Oval (A)	15,200

=== Premiership Season ===
Rd	Date and local time	Opponent	Scores (Hawthorn's scores indicated in bold)			Venue	Attendance	Record
Rd	Date and local time	Opponent	Home	Away	Result	Venue	Attendance	Record
1	Saturday, 14 April (2:15 pm)	Collingwood	**8.17 (65)**	14.13 (97)	Lost by 32 points	Glenferrie Oval (H)	24,000	0–1
2	Saturday, 21 April (2:15 pm)	Richmond	12.13 (85)	**16.10 (106)**	Won by 21 points	Punt Road Oval (A)	16,000	1–1
3	Saturday, 28 April (2:15 pm)	Geelong	**15.10 (100)**	16.16 (112)	Lost by 12 points	Glenferrie Oval (H)	20,000	1–2
4	Saturday, 5 May (2:15 pm)	South Melbourne	6.17 (53)	**8.11 (59)**	Won by 6 points	Lake Oval (A)	18,500	2–2
5	Saturday, 12 May (2:15 pm)	St Kilda	3.9 (27)	**6.12 (48)**	Won by 21 points	Junction Oval (A)	12,250	3–2
6	Saturday, 19 May (2:15 pm)	Footscray	**10.14 (74)**	10.11 (71)	Won by 3 points	Glenferrie Oval (H)	22,000	4–2
7	Saturday, 26 May (2:15 pm)	Fitzroy	**8.10 (58)**	9.13 (67)	Lost by 9 points	Glenferrie Oval (H)	18,000	4–3
8	Saturday, 2 June (2:15 pm)	Carlton	10.13 (73)	**5.9 (39)**	Lost by 34 points	Princes Park (A)	33,557	4–4
9	Saturday, 9 June (2:15 pm)	North Melbourne	**7.13 (55)**	3.12 (30)	Won by 25 points	Glenferrie Oval (H)	11,000	5–4
10	Saturday, 23 June (2:15 pm)	Essendon	12.20 (92)	**10.11 (71)**	Lost by 21 points	Windy Hill (A)	17,000	5–5
11	Saturday, 30 June (2:15 pm)	Melbourne	**5.12 (42)**	11.14 (80)	Lost by 38 points	Glenferrie Oval (H)	15,500	5–6
12	Saturday, 7 July (2:15 pm)	Collingwood	11.18 (84)	**8.10 (58)**	Lost by 26 points	Victoria Park (A)	17,150	5–7
13	Saturday, 14 July (2:15 pm)	Richmond	**3.13 (31)**	8.6 (54)	Lost by 23 points	Glenferrie Oval (H)	13,000	5–8
14	Saturday, 21 July (2:15 pm)	Geelong	12.13 (85)	**10.14 (74)**	Lost by 11 points	Kardinia Park (A)	13,373	5–9
15	Saturday, 28 July (2:15 pm)	South Melbourne	**10.18 (78)**	12.6 (78)	Draw	Glenferrie Oval (H)	12,500	5–9–1
16	Saturday, 4 August (2:15 pm)	St Kilda	**15.8 (98)**	12.9 (81)	Won by 17 points	Glenferrie Oval (H)	15,000	6–9–1
17	Saturday, 11 August (2:15 pm)	Footscray	15.13 (103)	**9.6 (60)**	Lost by 43 points	Western Oval (A)	16,492	6–10–1
18	Saturday, 18 August (2:15 pm)	Fitzroy	9.16 (70)	**10.17 (77)**	Won by 7 points	Brunswick Street Oval (A)	7,500	7–10–1

== Ladder ==
(P)	Premiers
	Qualified for finals

#	Team	P	W	L	D	PF	PA	%	Pts
1	Melbourne (P)	18	16	2	0	1429	979	146.0	64
2	Collingwood	18	13	5	0	1420	1128	125.9	52
3	Geelong	18	13	5	0	1427	1171	121.9	52
4	Footscray	18	11	7	0	1323	1159	114.2	44
5	Carlton	18	10	7	1	1304	1147	113.7	42
6	Essendon	18	10	8	0	1308	1365	95.8	40
7	Hawthorn	18	7	10	1	1193	1342	88.9	30
8	Fitzroy	18	7	11	0	1190	1332	89.3	28
9	South Melbourne	18	6	11	1	1210	1374	88.1	26
10	Richmond	18	6	12	0	1277	1471	86.8	24
11	St Kilda	18	4	13	1	1170	1330	88.0	18
12	North Melbourne	18	3	15	0	1038	1491	69.6	12

Rules for classification: 1. premiership points; 2. percentage; 3. points for
Average score: 70.8
Source: AFL Tables
