= 1958 Hawthorn Football Club season =

34th season in the Victorian Football League

Hawthorn Football Club
1958 season
- President: Dr. A.S. Ferguson
- Coach: Jack Hale
- Captain: John Kennedy Sr.
- Home ground: Glenferrie Oval
- Night series: Semi final
- VFL season: 9–9 (6th)
- Finals series: Did not qualify
- Best and fairest: Graham Arthur
- Leading goalkicker: John Peck (27)
- Highest home attendance: 22,500 (Round 13 vs. Collingwood)
- Lowest home attendance: 13,500 (Round 5 vs. North Melbourne)
- Average home attendance: 18,222

The 1958 season was the Hawthorn Football Club's 34th season in the Victorian Football League and 57th overall.

== Fixture ==
=== Night Series Cup ===
The night series went back to the format with only the teams that didn't qualify for finals competing in the series.

Rd	Date and local time	Opponent	Scores (Hawthorn's scores indicated in bold)			Venue	Attendance
Rd	Date and local time	Opponent	Home	Away	Result	Venue	Attendance
1	Tuesday, 9 September	South Melbourne	**9.19 (73)**	4.20 (44)	Won by 29 points	Lake Oval	17,850
Semi Final	Tuesday, 16 September	St Kilda	13.13 (91)	**6.10 (46)**	Lost by 45 points	Lake Oval	15,500

=== Premiership Season ===
Rd	Date and local time	Opponent	Scores (Hawthorn's scores indicated in bold)			Venue	Attendance	Record
Rd	Date and local time	Opponent	Home	Away	Result	Venue	Attendance	Record
1	Saturday, 12 April (2:15 pm)	St Kilda	**11.14 (80)**	11.13 (79)	Won by 1 point	Glenferrie Oval (H)	21,000	1–0
2	Saturday, 19 April (2:15 pm)	Collingwood	11.9 (75)	**10.8 (68)**	Lost by 7 points	Victoria Park (A)	28,769	1–1
3	Saturday, 26 April (2:15 pm)	Essendon	**10.14 (74)**	7.6 (48)	Won by 26 points	Glenferrie Oval (H)	21,000	2–1
4	Saturday, 3 May (2:15 pm)	Melbourne	11.10 (76)	**9.14 (68)**	Lost by 8 points	Melbourne Cricket Ground (A)	38,906	2–2
5	Saturday, 10 May (2:15 pm)	North Melbourne	**17.18 (120)**	9.4 (58)	Won by 62 points	Glenferrie Oval (H)	13,500	3–2
6	Saturday, 17 May (2:15 pm)	South Melbourne	**11.15 (81)**	8.16 (64)	Won by 17 points	Glenferrie Oval (H)	18,500	4–2
7	Saturday, 24 May (2:15 pm)	Fitzroy	12.15 (87)	**8.15 (63)**	Lost by 24 points	Brunswick Street Oval (A)	21,000	4–3
8	Saturday, 31 May (2:15 pm)	Carlton	9.14 (68)	**9.6 (60)**	Lost by 8 points	Princes Park (A)	16,500	4–4
9	Saturday, 7 June (2:15 pm)	Footscray	**11.14 (80)**	8.10 (58)	Won by 22 points	Glenferrie Oval (H)	19,000	5–4
10	Monday, 16 June (2:15 pm)	Geelong	**14.19 (103)**	8.6 (54)	Won by 49 points	Glenferrie Oval (H)	16,000	6–4
11	Saturday, 21 June (2:15 pm)	Richmond	15.11 (101)	**13.9 (87)**	Lost by 14 points	Punt Road Oval (A)	16,000	6–5
12	Saturday, 28 June (2:15 pm)	St Kilda	11.14 (80)	**14.14 (98)**	Won by 18 points	Junction Oval (A)	20,400	7–5
13	Saturday, 19 July (2:15 pm)	Collingwood	**12.14 (86)**	14.9 (93)	Lost by 7 points	Glenferrie Oval (H)	22,500	7–6
14	Saturday, 26 July (2:15 pm)	Essendon	11.15 (81)	**7.7 (49)**	Lost by 32 points	Windy Hill (A)	17,500	7–7
15	Saturday, 2 August (2:15 pm)	Melbourne	**12.15 (87)**	14.11 (95)	Lost by 8 points	Glenferrie Oval (H)	17,500	7–8
16	Saturday, 9 August (2:15 pm)	North Melbourne	7.18 (60)	**13.14 (92)**	Won by 32 points	Arden Street Oval (A)	11,500	8–8
17	Saturday, 16 August (2:15 pm)	South Melbourne	6.14 (50)	**6.12 (48)**	Lost by 2 points	Lake Oval (A)	17,500	8–9
18	Saturday, 23 August (2:15 pm)	Fitzroy	**11.9 (75)**	10.11 (71)	Won by 4 points	Glenferrie Oval (H)	15,000	9–9

== Ladder ==
(P)	Premiers
	Qualified for finals

#	Team	P	W	L	D	PF	PA	%	Pts
1	Melbourne	18	15	3	0	1608	1300	123.7	60
2	Collingwood (P)	18	12	6	0	1528	1235	123.7	48
3	Fitzroy	18	12	6	0	1551	1283	120.9	48
4	North Melbourne	18	11	7	0	1228	1324	92.7	44
5	Essendon	18	10	8	0	1519	1365	111.3	40
6	Hawthorn	18	9	9	0	1419	1298	109.3	36
7	Carlton	18	8	10	0	1158	1260	91.9	32
8	St Kilda	18	7	11	0	1340	1454	92.2	28
9	South Melbourne	18	7	11	0	1450	1634	88.7	28
10	Richmond	18	7	11	0	1425	1611	88.5	28
11	Footscray	18	6	12	0	1401	1440	97.3	24
12	Geelong	18	4	14	0	1192	1615	73.8	16

Rules for classification: 1. premiership points; 2. percentage; 3. points for
Average score: 77.9
Source: AFL Tables
