= 1964 Hawthorn Football Club season =

40th season in the Victorian Football League

Hawthorn Football Club
1964 season
- President: Dr. A.S. Ferguson
- Coach: Graham Arthur
- Captain: Graham Arthur
- Home ground: Glenferrie Oval
- Night series: Semi-final
- VFL season: 13–5 (5th)
- Finals series: Did not qualify
- Best and fairest: Ian Law
- Leading goalkicker: John Peck (68)
- Highest home attendance: 28,000 (Round 2 vs. Carlton)
- Lowest home attendance: 9,100 (Round 15 vs. North Melbourne)
- Average home attendance: 18,578

The 1964 season was the Hawthorn Football Club's 40th season in the Victorian Football League and 63rd overall.

== Fixture ==
=== Premiership season ===
Rd	Date and local time	Opponent	Scores (Hawthorn's scores indicated in bold)			Venue	Attendance	Record
Rd	Date and local time	Opponent	Home	Away	Result	Venue	Attendance	Record
1	Saturday, 18 April (2:20 pm)	South Melbourne	10.13 (73)	**14.13 (97)**	Won by 24 points	Lake Oval (A)	20,260	1–0
2	Saturday, 25 April (2:20 pm)	Carlton	**9.20 (74)**	8.5 (53)	Won by 21 points	Glenferrie Oval (H)	28,000	2–0
3	Saturday, 2 May (2:20 pm)	St Kilda	**12.15 (87)**	9.11 (65)	Won by 22 points	Glenferrie Oval (H)	25,000	3–0
4	Saturday, 9 May (2:20 pm)	North Melbourne	14.15 (99)	**9.14 (68)**	Lost by 31 points	Arden Street Oval (A)	17,431	3–1
5	Saturday, 16 May (2:20 pm)	Fitzroy	**16.18 (114)**	8.19 (67)	Won by 47 points	Glenferrie Oval (H)	13,100	4–1
6	Saturday, 23 May (2:20 pm)	Melbourne	10.13 (73)	**10.8 (68)**	Lost by 5 points	Melbourne Cricket Ground (A)	53,798	4–2
7	Saturday, 30 May (2:20 pm)	Richmond	**13.11 (89)**	7.16 (58)	Won by 31 points	Glenferrie Oval (H)	22,000	5–2
8	Saturday, 6 June (2:20 pm)	Essendon	**9.8 (62)**	6.12 (48)	Won by 14 points	Glenferrie Oval (H)	26,000	6–2
9	Monday, 15 June (2:20 pm)	Geelong	10.15 (75)	**3.8 (26)**	Lost by 49 points	Kardinia Park (A)	30,911	6–3
10	Saturday, 27 June (2:20 pm)	Collingwood	13.11 (89)	**15.8 (98)**	Won by 9 points	Victoria Park (A)	31,133	7–3
11	Saturday, 4 July (2:20 pm)	Footscray	**12.9 (81)**	3.3 (21)	Won by 60 points	Glenferrie Oval (H)	13,000	8–3
12	Saturday, 11 July (2:20 pm)	South Melbourne	**15.13 (103)**	6.15 (51)	Won by 52 points	Glenferrie Oval (H)	11,000	9–3
13	Saturday, 18 July (2:20 pm)	Carlton	5.12 (42)	**8.10 (58)**	Won by 16 points	Princes Park (A)	18,423	10–3
14	Saturday, 25 July (2:20 pm)	St Kilda	11.15 (81)	**7.9 (51)**	Lost by 30 points	Junction Oval (A)	18,600	10–4
15	Saturday, 1 August (2:20 pm)	North Melbourne	**7.7 (49)**	5.8 (38)	Won by 11 points	Glenferrie Oval (H)	9,100	11–4
16	Saturday, 8 August (2:20 pm)	Fitzroy	9.10 (64)	**10.13 (73)**	Won by 9 points	Brunswick Street Oval (A)	7,322	12–4
17	Saturday, 15 August (2:20 pm)	Melbourne	**10.9 (69)**	10.13 (73)	Lost by 4 points	Glenferrie Oval (H)	20,000	12–5
18	Saturday, 22 August (2:20 pm)	Richmond	9.18 (72)	**16.19 (115)**	Won by 43 points	Punt Road Oval (A)	15,500	13–5

=== Night series cup ===
Rd	Date and local time	Opponent	Scores (Hawthorn's scores indicated in bold)			Venue	Attendance
Rd	Date and local time	Opponent	Home	Away	Result	Venue	Attendance
1	Tuesday, 8 September	North Melbourne	**10.13 (73)**	7.13 (55)	Won by 18 points	Lake Oval	15,250
Semi Final	Thursday, 10 September	Footscray	8.12 (60)	**4.10 (34)**	Lost by 26 points	Lake Oval	18,720

== Ladder ==
(P)	Premiers
	Qualified for finals

#	Team	P	W	L	D	PF	PA	%	Pts
1	Melbourne (P)	18	14	4	0	1532	1109	138.1	56
2	Collingwood	18	13	4	1	1470	1104	133.2	54
3	Essendon	18	13	4	1	1499	1151	130.2	54
4	Geelong	18	13	4	1	1328	1042	127.4	54
5	Hawthorn	18	13	5	0	1382	1142	121.0	52
6	St Kilda	18	10	8	0	1408	1189	118.4	40
7	Footscray	18	9	9	0	1146	1301	88.1	36
8	North Melbourne	18	8	10	0	1231	1411	87.2	32
9	Richmond	18	6	12	0	1143	1346	84.9	24
10	Carlton	18	5	12	1	1190	1318	90.3	22
11	South Melbourne	18	2	16	0	1125	1654	68.0	8
12	Fitzroy	18	0	18	0	1019	1706	59.7	0

Rules for classification: 1. premiership points; 2. percentage; 3. points for
Average score: 71.6
Source: AFL Tables
