= 1954 Hawthorn Football Club season =

30th season in the Victorian Football League

Hawthorn Football Club
1954 season
- President: Dr. A.S. Ferguson
- Coach: Jack Hale
- Captain: Ted Fletcher
- Home ground: Glenferrie Oval
- VFL season: 8–10 (9th)
- Finals series: Did not qualify
- Best and fairest: John Kennedy Sr.
- Leading goalkicker: Kevin Coghlan (27)
- Highest home attendance: 26,000 (Round 7 vs. Footscray
- Lowest home attendance: 7,000 (Round 15 vs. North Melbourne)
- Average home attendance: 17,000

The 1954 season was the Hawthorn Football Club's 30th season in the Victorian Football League and the 53rd overall.

== Fixture ==
=== Premiership Season ===
Rd	Date and local time	Opponent	Scores (Hawthorn's scores indicated in bold)			Venue	Attendance	Record
Rd	Date and local time	Opponent	Home	Away	Result	Venue	Attendance	Record
1	Monday, 19 April (2:15 pm)	Essendon	**8.13 (61)**	14.11 (95)	Lost by 34 points	Glenferrie Oval (H)	23,000	0–1
2	Saturday, 24 April (2:15 pm)	St Kilda	5.9 (39)	**10.10 (70)**	Won by 31 points	Junction Oval (A)	14,000	1–1
3	Saturday, 1 May (2:15 pm)	Melbourne	**11.9 (75)**	9.10 (64)	Won by 11 points	Glenferrie Oval (H)	17,000	2–1
4	Saturday, 8 May (2:15 pm)	North Melbourne	11.10 (76)	**10.13 (73)**	Lost by 3 points	Arden Street Oval (A)	16,000	2–2
5	Saturday, 15 May (2:15 pm)	Geelong	**14.13 (97)**	13.14 (92)	Won by 5 points	Glenferrie Oval (H)	18,000	3–2
6	Saturday, 22 May (2:15 pm)	Richmond	10.12 (72)	**11.12 (78)**	Won by 6 points	Punt Road Oval (A)	23,000	4–2
7	Saturday, 29 May (2:15 pm)	Footscray	**10.9 (69)**	11.12 (78)	Lost by 9 points	Glenferrie Oval (H)	26,000	4–3
8	Saturday, 5 June (2:15 pm)	South Melbourne	6.13 (49)	**8.10 (58)**	Won by 9 points	Lake Oval (A)	22,000	5–3
9	Monday, 14 June (2:15 pm)	Carlton	5.11 (41)	**4.12 (36)**	Lost by 5 points	Princes Park (A)	34,000	5–4
10	Saturday, 26 June (2:15 pm)	Collingwood	**11.5 (71)**	10.15 (75)	Lost by 4 points	Glenferrie Oval (H)	25,000	5–5
11	Saturday, 3 July (2:15 pm)	Fitzroy	**11.15 (81)**	11.10 (76)	Won by 5 points	Glenferrie Oval (H)	12,000	6–5
12	Saturday, 10 July (2:15 pm)	Essendon	13.16 (94)	**9.9 (63)**	Lost by 31 points	Windy Hill (A)	20,000	6–6
13	Saturday, 17 July (2:15 pm)	St Kilda	**14.17 (101)**	5.10 (40)	Won by 61 points	Glenferrie Oval (H)	11,000	7–6
14	Saturday, 31 July (2:15 pm)	Melbourne	16.14 (110)	**5.3 (33)**	Lost by 77 points	Melbourne Cricket Ground (A)	26,708	7–7
15	Saturday, 7 August (2:15 pm)	North Melbourne	**9.5 (59)**	10.22 (82)	Lost by 23 points	Glenferrie Oval (H)	7,000	7–8
16	Saturday, 14 August (2:15 pm)	Geelong	13.12 (90)	**7.6 (48)**	Lost by 42 points	Kardinia Park (A)	16,870	7–9
17	Saturday, 21 August (2:15 pm)	Richmond	**10.10 (70)**	6.11 (47)	Won by 23 points	Glenferrie Oval (H)	14,000	8–9
18	Saturday, 28 August (2:15 pm)	Footscray	17.15 (117)	**5.4 (34)**	Lost by 83 points	Western Oval (A)	22,896	8–10

== Ladder ==
(P)	Premiers
	Qualified for finals

#	Team	P	W	L	D	PF	PA	%	Pts
1	Geelong	18	13	5	0	1630	1225	133.1	52
2	Footscray (P)	18	11	6	1	1423	1095	130.0	46
3	North Melbourne	18	11	6	1	1355	1361	99.6	46
4	Melbourne	18	11	7	0	1504	1239	121.4	44
5	Richmond	18	10	8	0	1503	1310	114.7	40
6	Essendon	18	10	8	0	1471	1364	107.8	40
7	Collingwood	18	10	8	0	1312	1301	100.8	40
8	Carlton	18	8	10	0	1382	1391	99.4	32
9	Hawthorn	18	8	10	0	1177	1337	88.0	32
10	South Melbourne	18	6	12	0	1209	1482	81.6	24
11	Fitzroy	18	4	13	1	1174	1604	73.2	18
12	St Kilda	18	4	13	1	1149	1580	72.7	18

Rules for classification: 1. premiership points; 2. percentage; 3. points for
Average score: 75.4
Source: AFL Tables
