= VFL night series =

Victorian Football League Night Series
- Sport: Australian rules football
- Founded: 1956
- Folded: 1971 (first cessation); 1978 (second cessation); 1987 (third cessation)
- No. of teams: 8
- Country: Australia
- Venue: South Melbourne Cricket Ground
- Most titles: Footscray (4 titles)
- Related competitions: Victorian Football League

The Victorian Football League night series, also known during its history by a variety of sponsored names, was an Australian rules football tournament held annually between 1956 and 1971, and again on three occasions in the late 1970s and 1980s. For most years the series was a consolation series, played on weekday nights each September as a knock-out tournament amongst teams which failed to reach the Victorian Football League finals.

== History ==
The Night Series Premiership was first established in 1956, contested in September as a three-round knock-out tournament amongst the eight VFL teams who did not make the final four, based on a similar post-season night competition which had been established in the SANFL in 1954. All VFL Night Series Premiership games were played at the South Melbourne Cricket Ground, which was the only ground equipped to host night games. Despite the fact that not all VFL teams participated, the first season's average crowd was 20,000 for the seven matches played, and a crowd of 33,120 watched the first night Grand Final.

The series was expanded in 1957 to include all twelve teams. The four teams which contested the VFL finals entered the Night Series after their VFL premiership season was finished, resulting in the night series running more than two weeks beyond the end of the day premiership. This was ultimately not successful, and the VFL elected to return to the original format in 1958, and remained under this format until 1971.

Interest in the night series, particularly among the clubs, began to reduce in the late 1960s as the home-and-away season was extended from eighteen rounds to twenty rounds in 1968, then again to twenty-two rounds in 1970. Additionally, in 1972, the VFL switched from a final four to a final-five finals system, leaving only seven teams available to contest the Night Series. Consequently, the Night Series was abolished after the 1971 season.

The series returned in 1977 and 1978, as the VFL went head-to-head with the NFL Night Series in those years, the VFL clubs having left the latter competition after 1976. The VFL won out in the battle, with the last NFL series taking place in 1979, the same year that the VFL-owned AFC Night Series commenced operations. With the AFC series underway, the VFL Night Series ended following the 1978 series, though it returned for one final year in 1987. These series in 1977, 1978 and 1987 were played by all the VFL clubs.

During its history, the Night Series was used to trial rule changes. Two particular rules which were trialled and later introduced were the free kick for kicking out of bounds on the full (trialled in 1966, introduced in the VFL in 1969 and nationally in 1970) and the centre square to control congestion at centre bounces (trialled in 1966, introduced nationally in 1973).

The consolation night series is generally considered to be of equivalent importance as the Australian Football Championships Night Series (1979–1986) and the Australian Football League pre-season competition (1988–2013), and records relating to the three competitions are often combined.

=== Competition names ===
During its history, the night series was known by the following sponsored names:

- 1965–1969 – Golden Fleece Cup
- 1970 – Radiant Cup
- 1971 – H. J. Heinz Cup
- 1977-1978 – Amco-Herald Cup
- 1987 – National Panasonic Cup

== Winners ==
Year	Winners	Grand Finalist	Scores	Venue	Crowd	Margin	Season Result
1956	South Melbourne	Carlton	13.16 (94) – 13.10 (88)	SMCG	32,450	6	9th
1957	South Melbourne	Geelong	15.13 (103) – 8.4 (52)	SMCG	25,000	51	10th
1958	St Kilda	Carlton	16.13 (109) – 15.11 (101)	SMCG	26,400	8	8th
1959	Fitzroy	Hawthorn	10.10 (70) – 4.16 (40)	SMCG	9,200	30	5th
1960	South Melbourne	Hawthorn	10.12 (72) – 8.11 (59)	SMCG	20,000	13	8th
1961	Geelong	North Melbourne	9.20 (74) – 9.8 (62)	SMCG	30,465	12	6th
1962	Richmond	Hawthorn	8.16 (64) – 9.6 (60)	SMCG	24,550	4	8th
1963	Footscray	Richmond	10.9 (69) – 9.9 (63)	SMCG	25,270	6	9th
1964	Footscray	St Kilda	11.12 (78) – 11.7 (73)	SMCG	36,300	5	10th
1965	North Melbourne	Carlton	14.13 (97) – 9.3 (57)	SMCG	37,750	40	9th
1966	North Melbourne	Hawthorn	20.12 (132) – 12.7 (79)	SMCG	22,800	53	7th
1967	Footscray	South Melbourne	15.11 (101) – 8.8 (56)	SMCG	26,731	45	12th
1968	Hawthorn	North Melbourne	16.15 (111) – 6.14 (50)	SMCG	15,650	61	6th
1969	Hawthorn	Melbourne	10.17 (77) – 9.18 (72)	SMCG	21,067	5	5th
1970	Footscray	Melbourne	13.17 (95) – 13.15 (93)	SMCG	23,882	2	7th
1971	Melbourne	Fitzroy	12.7 (79) – 9.9 (63)	SMCG	21,169	16	7th
1977	Hawthorn	Carlton	14.11 (95) – 11.5 (71)	VFL Park	27,407	24	2nd
1978	Fitzroy	North Melbourne	13.18 (96) – 2.8 (20)	VFL Park	26,420	76	9th
1987	Melbourne	Essendon	8.10 (58) – 8.6 (54)	VFL Park	26,860	4	5th

- SMCG - South Melbourne Cricket Ground

=== Most night series wins ===
Team	Wins	Seasons
Footscray	4	1963, 1964, 1967, 1970
South Melbourne	3	1956, 1957, 1960
Hawthorn	3	1968, 1969, 1977
North Melbourne	2	1965, 1966
Fitzroy	2	1959, 1978
Melbourne	2	1971, 1987
St Kilda	1	1958
Geelong	1	1961
Richmond	1	1962
Carlton	0	
Collingwood	0	
Essendon	0	

== See also ==
- List of Australian Football League pre-season and night series premiers
