= 1935 Hawthorn Football Club season =

11th season in the Victorian Football League

Hawthorn Football Club
1935 season
- President: Dr. Jacob Jona
- Coach: Ivan McAlpine
- Captain: Ivan McAlpine
- Home ground: Glenferrie Oval
- VFL Season: 5–13 (10th)
- Finals Series: Did not qualify
- Best and Fairest: Bert Mills
- Leading goalkicker: Jack Green (63)
- Highest home attendance: 23,000 (Round 2 vs. Carlton
- Lowest home attendance: 4,000 (Round 12 vs. North Melbourne)
- Average home attendance: 10,167

The 1935 season was the Hawthorn Football Club's 11th season in the Victorian Football League and the 34th overall.

== Fixture ==
=== Premiership Season ===
Rd	Date and local time	Opponent	Scores (Hawthorn's scores indicated in bold)			Venue	Attendance	Record
Rd	Date and local time	Opponent	Home	Away	Result	Venue	Attendance	Record
1	Saturday, 27 April (2:45 pm)	North Melbourne	12.11 (83)	**14.3 (87)**	Won by 4 points	Arden Street Oval (A)	7,000	1–0
2	Monday, 6 May (2:45 pm)	Carlton	**9.6 (60)**	14.27 (111)	Lost by 51 points	Glenferrie Oval (H)	23,000	1–1
3	Saturday, 11 May (2:45 pm)	Melbourne	15.19 (109)	**11.13 (79)**	Lost by 30 points	Melbourne Cricket Ground (A)	7,788	1–2
4	Saturday, 18 May (2:45 pm)	St Kilda	**6.17 (53)**	16.8 (104)	Lost by 51 points	Glenferrie Oval (H)	11,000	1–3
5	Saturday, 25 May (2:45 pm)	Essendon	13.20 (98)	**12.14 (86)**	Lost by 12 points	Windy Hill (A)	10,000	1–4
6	Saturday, 1 June (2:45 pm)	Geelong	**14.9 (93)**	22.19 (151)	Lost by 58 points	Glenferrie Oval (H)	9,500	1–5
7	Saturday, 8 June (2:45 pm)	Fitzroy	14.12 (96)	**13.8 (86)**	Lost by 10 points	Brunswick Street Oval (A)	9,000	1–6
8	Saturday, 15 June (2:45 pm)	South Melbourne	**9.23 (77)**	17.14 (116)	Lost by 39 points	Glenferrie Oval (H)	12,000	1–7
9	Saturday, 22 June (2:45 pm)	Richmond	14.7 (91)	**10.13 (73)**	Lost by 18 points	Punt Road Oval (A)	4,000	1–8
10	Saturday, 29 June (2:45 pm)	Footscray	**12.13 (85)**	14.6 (90)	Lost by 5 points	Glenferrie Oval (H)	9,000	1–9
11	Saturday, 6 July (2:45 pm)	Collingwood	17.20 (122)	**12.3 (75)**	Lost by 47 points	Victoria Park (A)	8,000	1–10
12	Saturday, 13 July (2:45 pm)	North Melbourne	**16.18 (114)**	6.10 (46)	Won by 68 points	Glenferrie Oval (H)	4,000	2–10
13	Saturday, 20 July (2:45 pm)	Carlton	21.16 (142)	**11.10 (76)**	Lost by 66 points	Princes Park (A)	12,000	2–11
14	Saturday, 27 July (2:45 pm)	Melbourne	**12.10 (82)**	14.17 (101)	Lost by 19 points	Glenferrie Oval (H)	7,000	2–12
15	Saturday, 10 August (2:45 pm)	St Kilda	17.22 (124)	**9.9 (63)**	Lost by 61 points	Junction Oval (A)	9,000	2–13
16	Saturday, 24 August (2:45 pm)	Essendon	**8.26 (74)**	9.12 (66)	Won by 8 points	Glenferrie Oval (H)	5,000	3–13
17	Saturday, 31 August (2:45 pm)	Geelong	7.17 (59)	**13.9 (87)**	Won by 28 points	Corio Oval (A)	2,500	4–13
18	Saturday, 7 September (2:45 pm)	Fitzroy	**14.26 (110)**	15.6 (96)	Won by 14 points	Glenferrie Oval (H)	11,000	5–13

== Ladder ==
(P)	Premiers
	Qualified for finals

#	Team	P	W	L	D	PF	PA	%	Pts
1	South Melbourne	18	16	2	0	1940	1410	137.6	64
2	Collingwood (P)	18	14	2	2	1895	1561	121.4	60
3	Carlton	18	14	3	1	1958	1383	141.6	58
4	Richmond	18	12	6	0	1572	1339	117.4	48
5	St Kilda	18	11	7	0	1708	1545	110.6	44
6	Melbourne	18	8	9	1	1601	1582	101.2	34
7	Fitzroy	18	8	9	1	1488	1649	90.2	34
8	Essendon	18	7	11	0	1526	1703	89.6	28
9	Geelong	18	6	11	1	1683	1747	96.3	26
10	Hawthorn	18	5	13	0	1460	1805	80.9	20
11	Footscray	18	2	14	2	1272	1731	73.5	12
12	North Melbourne	18	1	17	0	1208	1856	65.1	4

Rules for classification: 1. premiership points; 2. percentage; 3. points for
Average score: 89.4
Source: AFL Tables
