= 1990 Foster's Cup =

- AFL pre-season competition
- Season: 1990
- Teams: 14
- Winners: Essendon (1st title)
- Matches played: 13
- Attendance: 216,946 (average 16,688 per match)

The 1990 AFL Foster's Cup was the Australian Football League pre-season cup competition played in its entirety before the 1990 season began.

== Games ==
=== 1st Round ===
Home team	Home team score	Away team	Away team score	Ground	Crowd	Date
Footscray	10.15 (75)	Richmond	8.6 (54)	Waverley Park	16,968	Wednesday, 7 February
Essendon	5.11 (41)	West Coast	4.14 (38)	Waverley Park	6,988	Saturday, 10 February
Fitzroy	12.13 (85)	St Kilda	9.13 (67)	Waverley Park	12,656	Wednesday, 14 February
Carlton	17.7 (109)	Collingwood	12.10 (82)	Waverley Park	41,185	Saturday, 17 February
North Melbourne	10.8 (68)	West Coast (Note: West Coast replaced Brisbane, who were forced to withdraw due to financial problems and a player's strike.)	8.18 (66)	Waverley Park	4,554	Wednesday, 21 February
Sydney	16.9 (105)	Hawthorn	13.17 (95)	Bruce Stadium	12,314	Sunday, 25 February

=== Quarter-finals ===
Home team	Home team score	Away team	Away team score	Ground	Crowd	Date
Footscray	8.8 (56)	Melbourne	12.13 (85)	Waverley Park	15,010	Saturday, 24 February
Essendon	7.10 (52) (Note: The match was decided after extra time; scores were level at 6.10 (46) to 7.4 (46) after the conclusion of regular time.)	Fitzroy	7.4 (46)	Waverley Park	8,144	Wednesday, 28 February
Carlton	9.13 (67)	Sydney	9.12 (66)	Waverley Park	14,613	Saturday, 3 March
Geelong	12.8 (80)	North Melbourne	20.20 (140)	Waverley Park	10,123	Sunday, 4 March

=== Semi-finals ===
Home team	Home team score	Away team	Away team score	Ground	Crowd	Date
Essendon	14.12 (96)	Melbourne	6.13 (49)	Waverley Park	13,383	Wednesday, 7 March
Carlton	9.16 (70)	North Melbourne	14.14 (98)	Waverley Park	12,449	Saturday, 10 March

=== Final ===
Home team	Home team score	Away team	Away team score	Ground	Crowd	Date
Essendon	17.10 (112)	North Melbourne	10.16 (76)	Waverley Park	48,559	Saturday, 17 March

== See also ==
- List of Australian Football League night premiers
- 1990 AFL season
