= List of VFL/AFL pre-season and night series premiers =

This page is a complete chronological listing of the pre-season and night series premiers of the Australian Football League (AFL), known as the Victorian Football League (VFL) until 1990. Although it spans three different competitions, the premierships are considered historically equivalent.

From 1956 to 1971, the first VFL Night Series was a consolation knock-out competition held in September at the Lake Oval in Albert Park amongst the eight teams who failed to reach the finals in the VFL premiership season – apart from 1957, when all twelve teams competed.

There were no official VFL night series held during the 1972 to 1976 seasons, although in 1976 the National Football League (the national governing body at the time) held its own night series mid-week during the season, known as the NFL Wills Cup. This led to the VFL reviving its own night series, now also held mid-week during the season among all clubs, and televised on Channel 7 to rival the NFL series that was shown on Channel 10. While the 1977 series only featured the twelve VFL teams, between 1978 and 1986 a selection of teams from the SANFL, WAFL and representative teams from Australian Capital Territory, New South Wales, Queensland and Tasmania also competed. This became known as the Australian Football Championships Night Series and ran until 1987.

With the national expansion of the VFL to include teams from Western Australia and Queensland the 1987 series was restricted to only the 14 VFL teams and commenced during the pre-season period, but was completed mid-week between rounds 5 and 6 of the 1987 VFL season.

From 1988 until 2013, the competition was played in its entirety before the premiership season began and is competed for by only the VFL or AFL teams (the VFL was renamed the AFL in 1990), and became the Australian Football League pre-season competition. The preseason competition was abandoned in 2014, and replaced with discrete practice matches.

== Consolation night series (Lake Oval) winners (1956–1971) ==
| Year | Winners | Grand finalist | Scores | Venue | Crowd | Margin | Season result |
|---|---|---|---|---|---|---|---|
| 1956 | South Melbourne | Carlton | 13.16 (94) – 13.10 (88) | Lake Oval | 32,450 | 6 | 9th |
| 1957 | South Melbourne | Geelong | 15.13 (103) – 8.4 (52) | Lake Oval | 25,000 | 51 | 10th |
| 1958 | St Kilda | Carlton | 16.13 (109) – 15.11 (101) | Lake Oval | 26,400 | 8 | 8th |
| 1959 | Fitzroy | Hawthorn | 10.10 (70) – 4.16 (40) | Lake Oval | 9,200 | 30 | 5th |
| 1960 | South Melbourne | Hawthorn | 10.12 (72) – 8.11 (59) | Lake Oval | 20,000 | 13 | 8th |
| 1961 | Geelong | North Melbourne | 9.20 (74) – 9.8 (62) | Lake Oval | 30,465 | 12 | 6th |
| 1962 | Richmond | Hawthorn | 8.16 (64) – 9.6 (60) | Lake Oval | 24,550 | 4 | 8th |
| 1963 | Footscray | Richmond | 10.9 (69) – 9.9 (63) | Lake Oval | 25,270 | 6 | 9th |
| 1964 | Footscray | St Kilda | 11.12 (78) – 11.7 (73) | Lake Oval | 36,300 | 5 | 10th |
| 1965 | North Melbourne | Carlton | 14.13 (97) – 9.3 (57) | Lake Oval | 37,750 | 40 | 9th |
| 1966 | North Melbourne | Hawthorn | 20.12 (132) – 12.7 (79) | Lake Oval | 22,800 | 53 | 7th |
| 1967 | Footscray | South Melbourne | 15.11 (101) – 8.8 (56) | Lake Oval | 26,731 | 45 | 12th |
| 1968 | Hawthorn | North Melbourne | 16.15 (111) – 6.14 (50) | Lake Oval | 15,650 | 61 | 6th |
| 1969 | Hawthorn | Melbourne | 10.17 (77) – 9.18 (72) | Lake Oval | 21,067 | 5 | 5th |
| 1970 | Footscray | Melbourne | 13.17 (95) – 13.15 (93) | Lake Oval | 23,882 | 2 | 7th |
| 1971 | Melbourne | Fitzroy | 12.7 (79) – 9.9 (63) | Lake Oval | 21,169 | 16 | 7th |

=== Most Consolation Night Series (Lake Oval) wins (1956–1971) ===
| Team | Wins | Seasons |
|---|---|---|
| Footscray | 4 | 1963, 1964, 1967, 1970 |
| South Melbourne | 3 | 1956, 1957, 1960 |
| Hawthorn | 2 | 1968, 1969 |
| North Melbourne | 2 | 1965, 1966 |
| Melbourne | 1 | 1971 |
| St Kilda | 1 | 1958 |
| Fitzroy | 1 | 1959 |
| Geelong | 1 | 1961 |
| Richmond | 1 | 1962 |

== Night series winners (1977–1987) ==
| Year | Winners | Grand finalist | Scores | Venue | Crowd | Margin | Season result |
|---|---|---|---|---|---|---|---|
| 1977 | Hawthorn | Carlton | 14.11 (95) – 11.5 (71) | VFL Park | 27,407 | 24 | Preliminary Finalist |
| 1978 | Fitzroy | North Melbourne | 13.18 (96) – 2.8 (20) | VFL Park | 26,420 | 76 | 9th |
| 1979 | Collingwood | Hawthorn | 12.8 (80) – 7.10 (52) | VFL Park | 37,753 | 28 | Grand Finalist |
| 1980 | North Melbourne | Collingwood | 8.9 (57) – 7.12 (54) | VFL Park | 50,478 | 3 | Elimination Finalist |
| 1981 | Essendon | Carlton | 9.11 (65) – 6.5 (41) | VFL Park | 42,269 | 24 | Elimination Finalist |
| 1982 | Swans | North Melbourne | 13.12 (90) – 8.10 (58) | VFL Park | 20,028 | 32 | 7th |
| 1983 | Carlton | Richmond | 14.16 (100) – 10.6 (66) | VFL Park | 32,927 | 34 | Elimination Finalist |
| 1984 | Essendon | Sydney Swans | 13.11 (89) – 5.8 (38) | VFL Park | 30,824 | 51 | Premier |
| 1985 | Hawthorn | Essendon | 11.11 (77) – 10.8 (68) | VFL Park | 24,812 | 9 | Grand Finalist |
| 1986 | Hawthorn | Carlton | 9.12 (66) – 5.6 (36) | VFL Park | 19,627 | 30 | Premier |
| 1987 | Melbourne | Essendon | 8.10 (58) – 8.6 (54) | VFL Park | 26,860 | 4 | Preliminary Finalist |

=== Most night series wins (1977–1987) ===
| Team | Wins | Seasons |
|---|---|---|
| Hawthorn | 3 | 1977, 1985, 1986 |
| Essendon | 2 | 1981, 1984 |
| Melbourne | 1 | 1987 |
| Carlton | 1 | 1983 |
| Sydney Swans | 1 | 1982 |
| North Melbourne | 1 | 1980 |
| Collingwood | 1 | 1979 |
| Fitzroy | 1 | 1978 |

== Pre-season cup winners (1988–2013) ==
| Year | Premier | Runner-up | Scores | Venue | Crowd | Margin | Winner season | Runner-up season |
|---|---|---|---|---|---|---|---|---|
| 1988 | Hawthorn | Geelong | 10.10 (70) – 9.13 (67) | Waverley Park | 35,803 | 3 | Premier | 9th |
| 1989 | Melbourne | Geelong | 10.16 (76) – 9.13 (67) | Waverley Park | 48,720 | 9 | Semi Finalist | Grand Finalist |
| 1990 | Essendon | North Melbourne | 17.10 (112) – 10.16 (76) | Waverley Park | 48,559 | 36 | Grand Finalist | 6th |
| 1991 | Hawthorn | North Melbourne | 14.19 (103) – 7.12 (54) | Waverley Park | 46,629 | 49 | Premier | 8th |
| 1992 | Hawthorn | Fitzroy | 19.14 (128) – 8.15 (63) | Waverley Park | 49,453 | 65 | Elimination Finalist | 10th |
| 1993 | Essendon | Richmond | 14.18 (102) – 11.13 (79) | Waverley Park | 75,533 | 23 | Premier | 14th |
| 1994 | Essendon | Adelaide | 15.12 (102) – 9.14 (68) | Waverley Park | 43,925 | 34 | 10th | 11th |
| 1995 | North Melbourne | Adelaide | 14.9 (93) – 8.15 (63) | Waverley Park | 39,393 | 30 | Preliminary Finalist | 11th |
| 1996 | St Kilda | Carlton | 20.10 (130) – 10.12 (72) | Waverley Park | 66,888 | 58 | 10th | Semi-Finalist |
| 1997 | Carlton | Geelong | 14.13 (97) – 5.10 (40) | MCG | 63,898 | 57 | 11th | Semi Finalist |
| 1998 | North Melbourne | St Kilda | 14.13 (97) – 12.11 (83) | Waverley Park | 63,760 | 14 | Grand Finalist | Semi-Finalist |
| 1999 | Hawthorn | Port Adelaide | 12.11 (83) – 5.6 (36) | Waverley Park | 74,786 | 47 | 9th | Elimination Finalist |
| 2000 | Essendon | North Melbourne | 16.21 (117) – 11.10 (76) | MCG | 56,720 | 41 | Premier | Preliminary Finalist |
| 2001 | Port Adelaide | Brisbane Lions | 17.9 (111) – 3.8 (26) | Football Park | 35,304 | 85 | Semi Finalist | Premier |
| 2002 | Port Adelaide | Richmond | 10.11 (71) – 9.8 (62) | Colonial Stadium | 36,481 | 9 | Preliminary Finalist | 14th |
| 2003 | Adelaide | Collingwood | 2.13.8 (104) – 1.9.10 (73) | Telstra Dome | 43,571 | 31 | Semi Finalist | Grand Finalist |
| 2004 | St Kilda | Geelong | 1.14.5 (98) – 1.10.7 (76) | Telstra Dome | 50,533 | 22 | Preliminary Finalist | Preliminary Finalist |
| 2005 | Carlton | West Coast Eagles | 1.14.18 (111) – 1.11.9 (84) | Telstra Dome | 43,391 | 27 | 16th (Wooden Spoon) | Grand Finalist |
| 2006 | Geelong | Adelaide | 3.10.5 (92) – 1.10.15 (84) | AAMI Stadium | 30,707 | 8 | 9th | Preliminary Finalist |
| 2007 | Carlton | Brisbane Lions | 2.12.7 (97) – 0.10.12 (72) | Telstra Dome | 46,094 | 25 | 15th | 10th |
| 2008 | St Kilda | Adelaide | 2.7.9 (69) – 0.9.10 (64) | AAMI Stadium | 26,823 | 5 | Preliminary Finalist | Elimination Finalist |
| 2009 | Geelong | Collingwood | 0.18.19 (127) – 1.6.6 (51) | Etihad Stadium | 37,277 | 76 | Premier | Preliminary Finalist |
| 2010 | Western Bulldogs | St Kilda | 2.13.8 (104) – 0.9.10 (64) | Etihad Stadium | 42,381 | 40 | Preliminary Finalist | Grand Finalist |
| 2011 | Collingwood | Essendon | 1.15.9 (108) – 0.13.8 (86) | Etihad Stadium | 45,304 | 22 | Grand Finalist | Elimination Finalist |
| 2012 | Adelaide | West Coast Eagles | 2.10.17 (95) – 2.5.13 (61) | AAMI Stadium | 27,376 | 34 | Preliminary Finalist | Semi-Finalist |
| 2013 | Brisbane Lions | Carlton | 0.16.13 (109) – 2.7.9 (69) | Etihad Stadium | 24,884 | 40 | 12th | Semi-Finalist |

^The Australian Football League was called the Victorian Football League prior to 1990.
From 2003 onwards, the pre-season cup competition has had a modified scoring system (not the usual scoring system that is used in the premiership season), that includes awarding 9 points for Super Goals that are kicked from outside the 50m arc and 3 points for rushed behinds.

The last pre-season premiership was awarded in 2013, as subsequent pre-season tournaments had no declared winner.

=== Most pre-season cup competition wins (1988–2013) ===
| Team | Wins | Most Recent Win |
|---|---|---|
| Essendon | 4 | 2000 |
| Hawthorn | 4 | 1999 |
| St Kilda | 3 | 2008 |
| Carlton | 3 | 2007 |
| Adelaide | 2 | 2012 |
| Geelong | 2 | 2009 |
| Port Adelaide | 2 | 2002 |
| North Melbourne | 2 | 1998 |
| Brisbane Lions | 1 | 2013 |
| Collingwood | 1 | 2011 |
| Western Bulldogs | 1 | 2010 |
| Melbourne | 1 | 1989 |

== Total pre-season and night series wins ==
| Team | Wins | Seasons |
|---|---|---|
| Hawthorn | 9 | 1968, 1969, 1977, 1985, 1986, 1988, 1991, 1992, 1999 |
| Essendon | 6 | 1981, 1984, 1990, 1993, 1994, 2000 |
| Footscray / Western Bulldogs | 5 | 1963, 1964, 1967, 1970, 2010 |
| North Melbourne / Kangaroos | 5 | 1965, 1966, 1980, 1995, 1998 |
| South Melbourne / Sydney Swans | 4 | 1956, 1957, 1960, 1982 |
| St Kilda | 4 | 1958, 1996, 2004, 2008 |
| Carlton | 4 | 1983, 1997, 2005, 2007 |
| Geelong | 3 | 1961, 2006, 2009 |
| Melbourne | 3 | 1971, 1987, 1989 |
| Adelaide | 2 | 2003, 2012 |
| Collingwood | 2 | 1979, 2011 |
| Fitzroy | 2 | 1959, 1978 |
| Port Adelaide | 2 | 2001, 2002 |
| Brisbane Lions | 1 | 2013 |
| Richmond | 1 | 1962 |
Ref:

== Back-to-back night/pre-season winners ==
| Season | Premier | Runner Up | Score | Venue | Attendance | Margin |
| 1956 | South Melbourne | Carlton | 13.16 (94) – 13.10 (88) | Lake Oval | 32,450 | 6 |
| 1957 | South Melbourne | Geelong | 15.13 (103) – 8.4 (52) | Lake Oval | 25,000 | 51 |
| 1963 | Footscray | Richmond | 10.9 (69) – 9.9 (63) | Lake Oval | 25,270 | 6 |
| 1964 | Footscray | St Kilda | 11.12 (78) – 11.7 (73) | Lake Oval | 36,300 | 5 |
| 1965 | North Melbourne | Carlton | 14.13 (97) – 9.3 (57) | Lake Oval | 37,750 | 40 |
| 1966 | North Melbourne | Hawthorn | 20.12 (132) – 12.7 (79) | Lake Oval | 22,800 | 53 |
| 1968 | Hawthorn | North Melbourne | 16.15 (111) – 6.14 (50) | Lake Oval | 15,650 | 61 |
| 1969 | Hawthorn | Melbourne | 10.17 (77) – 9.18 (72) | Lake Oval | 21,067 | 5 |
| 1985 | Hawthorn | Essendon | 11.11 (77) – 10.8 (68) | Waverley Park | 24,812 | 9 |
| 1986 | Hawthorn | Carlton | 9.12 (66) – 5.6 (36) | Waverley Park | 19,627 | 30 |
| 1991 | Hawthorn | North Melbourne | 14.19 (103) – 7.12 (54) | Waverley Park | 46,629 | 49 |
| 1992 | Hawthorn | Fitzroy | 19.14 (128) – 8.15 (63) | Waverley Park | 49,453 | 65 |
| 1993 | Essendon | Richmond | 14.18 (102) – 11.13 (79) | Waverley Park | 75,533 | 23 |
| 1994 | Essendon | Adelaide | 15.12 (102) – 9.14 (68) | Waverley Park | 43,925 | 34 |
| 2001 | Port Adelaide | Brisbane Lions | 17.9 (111) – 3.8 (26) | Football Park | 35,304 | 85 |
| 2002 | Port Adelaide | Richmond | 10.11 (71) – 9.8 (62) | Colonial Stadium | 36,481 | 9 |

== Double premiership teams ==
The double premiership of winning both the night/pre-season and main premiership competitions has been achieved on seven occasions, by three clubs. In 2007, the AFL announced that if a club won both titles, they would win a $1 million bonus. The offer was not extended past that season, so neither St Kilda, who won the 2008 NAB Cup and made the preliminary final of the 2008 AFL season, nor Geelong, who achieved the double in 2009, were eligible for the extra prize money.

Four teams have won the pre-season premiership immediately after winning the main-season premiership. Carlton won the main VFL Premiership in 1982 and backed it up with a night premiership in 1983. Hawthorn won the AFL Premiership in 1991; they then backed it up the following year to win the pre-season competition in 1992. Essendon won the 1993 AFL Grand Final and then also won the 1994 Foster's Cup. Collingwood won the 2010 AFL Grand Final and then also won the 2011 NAB Cup.

| Season | Premier | Runner Up | Score | Venue | Attendance | Premiership |
| 1984 | Essendon | Sydney Swans | 13.11 (89) – 5.8 (38) | Waverley Park | 30,824 | 1984 Night series |
| 1984 | Essendon | Hawthorn | 14.21 (105) – 12.9 (81) | MCG | 92,685 | 1984 VFL Grand Final |
| 1986 | Hawthorn | Carlton | 9.12 (66) – 5.6 (36) | Waverley Park | 19,627 | 1986 Night series |
| 1986 | Hawthorn | Carlton | 16.14 (110) – 9.14 (68) | MCG | 101,861 | 1986 VFL Grand Final |
| 1988 | Hawthorn | Geelong | 10.10 (70) – 9.13 (67) | Waverley Park | 35,803 | 1988 Pre-Season Cup |
| 1988 | Hawthorn | Melbourne | 22.20 (152) – 6.20 (56) | MCG | 93,754 | 1988 VFL Grand Final |
| 1991 | Hawthorn | North Melbourne | 14.19 (103) – 7.12 (54) | Waverley Park | 46,629 | 1991 Pre-Season Cup |
| 1991 | Hawthorn | West Coast | 20.19 (139) – 13.8 (86) | Waverley Park | 75,230 | 1991 AFL Grand Final |
| 1993 | Essendon | Richmond | 14.18 (102) – 11.13 (79) | Waverley Park | 75,533 | 1993 Pre-Season Cup |
| 1993 | Essendon | Carlton | 20.13 (133) – 13.11 (89) | MCG | 96,862 | 1993 AFL Grand Final |
| 2000 | Essendon | North Melbourne | 16.21 (117) – 11.10 (76) | MCG | 56,720 | 2000 Pre-Season Cup |
| 2000 | Essendon | Melbourne | 19.21 (135) – 11.9 (75) | MCG | 96,249 | 2000 AFL Grand Final |
| 2009 | Geelong | Collingwood | 0.18.19 (127) – 1.6.6 (51) | Etihad Stadium | 37,277 | 2009 Pre-Season Cup |
| 2009 | Geelong | St Kilda | 12.8 (80) – 9.14 (68) | MCG | 99,251 | 2009 AFL Grand Final |

== See also ==
- List of Australian Football League premiers
