= 1987 VFL Night Series =

VFL National Panasonic Cup

Tournament details
- Dates: 17 February – 29 April 1987
- Teams: 14
- Venue(s): 1 (in 1 host city)

Final positions
- Champions: Melbourne (2nd title)
- Runners-up: Essendon

The 1987 Victorian Football League Night Series (also known as the 1987 National Panasonic Cup) was the 19th edition of the VFL Night Series, a Victorian Football League (VFL)-organised Australian rules football tournament between the clubs from the VFL.

It was the first night series event that was run entirely under the control of the VFL since 1978 VFL Night Series, and the first series since the demise of VFL-owned Australian Football Championships (AFC) tournament that included teams from rival state league competitions such as the SANFL, WAFL and elsewhere. It was also the last night series to be partially staged during the home-and-away premiership season, with future tournaments held only during the pre-season.

== Teams ==
All 14 teams that participated in the 1987 VFL season, including the two non-Victorian expansion teams (West Coast and Brisbane) participated in the series.

- Brisbane Bears
- Carlton
- Collingwood
- Essendon
- Fitzroy
- Footscray
- Geelong
- Hawthorn
- Melbourne
- North Melbourne
- Richmond
- St Kilda
- Sydney Swans
- West Coast

== Venues ==
Melbourne
VFL Park
Capacity: 72,000
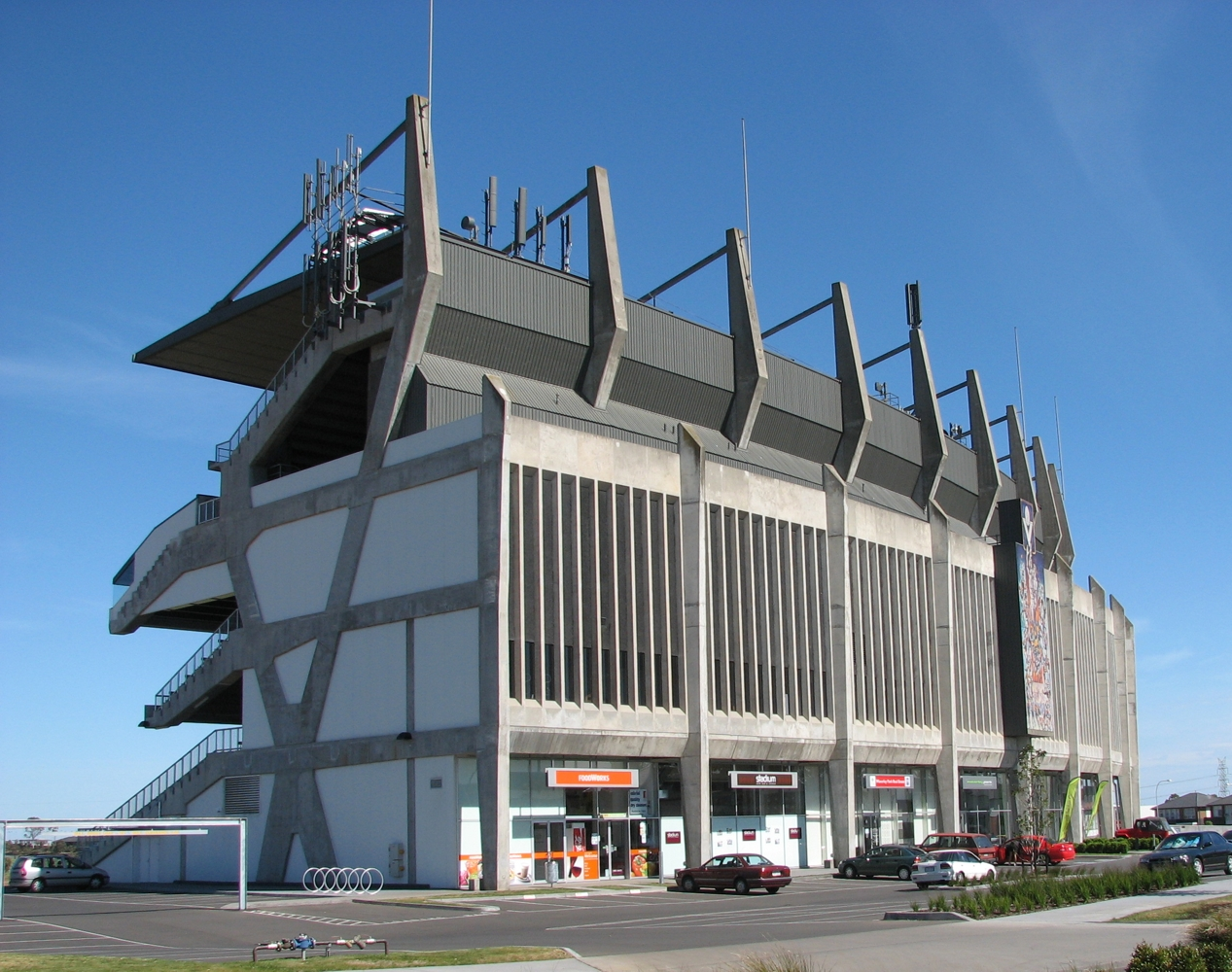

== Results ==
- Click here for source of results

=== Round 1 ===
17 Feb	Geelong	79–59	Collingwood	VFL Park, Melbourne
				Attendance: 19,696

21 Feb	Carlton	64–53	Fitzroy	VFL Park, Melbourne
				Attendance: 11,110

24 Feb	Melbourne	89–73	Richmond	VFL Park, Melbourne
				Attendance: 6,467

28 Feb	Hawthorn	112–72	North Melbourne	VFL Park, Melbourne
				Attendance: 5,956

3 Mar	West Coast	87–58	Footscray	VFL Park, Melbourne
				Attendance: 4,599

7 Mar	Essendon	94–51	St Kilda	VFL Park, Melbourne
				Attendance: 11,782

10 Mar	Sydney	146–70	Brisbane	VFL Park, Melbourne
				Attendance: 8,317

=== Quarter-finals ===
- Note: Fitzroy qualified as a "lucky loser", given they lost their first round match by the lowest margin (11 points) of any losing team

14 Mar	Geelong	80–61	Carlton	VFL Park, Melbourne
				Attendance: 11,472

17 Mar	Melbourne	96–67	Hawthorn	VFL Park, Melbourne
				Attendance: 6,526

21 Mar	West Coast	87–64	Fitzroy	VFL Park, Melbourne
				Attendance: 5,047

31 Mar	Essendon	103–42	Sydney	VFL Park, Melbourne
				Attendance: 6,734

=== Semi-finals ===
7 Apr	Melbourne	85–55	Geelong	VFL Park, Melbourne
				Attendance: 6,459

14 Apr	Essendon	148–40	West Coast	VFL Park, Melbourne
				Attendance: 6,928

=== Final ===
Final 29 April	Melbourne	58–54	Essendon	VFL Park, Melbourne
	3.2 (20); 3.6 (24); 7.9 (51); 8.10 (58)		1.4 (10); 3.4 (22); 7.4 (46); 8.6 (54)	Attendance: 26,860; Umpires: McDonald, Sawers
		Goals
	Dean 3 Giles, Bailey 2 Wight 1		Merrett, Van der Haar 2 T. Daniher, S. Clark, Williams, K. Walsh 1
