= John Kennedy Sr. (footballer) =

Australian rules footballer and coach (1928–2020)

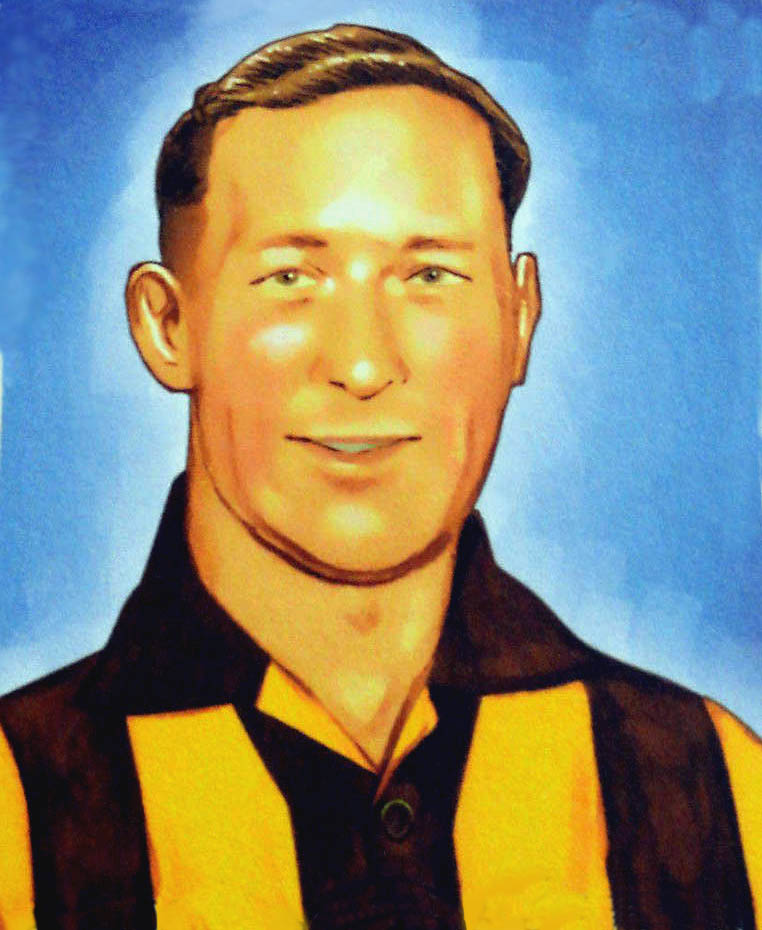
- Kennedy pictured for a series of collectible cards in the 1950s

Personal information
- Full name: John James Kennedy Sr.
- Nickname: Kanga
- Born: 29 December 1928; Camberwell, Victoria
- Died: 24 June 2020 (aged 91)
- Height: 188 cm (6 ft 2 in)
- Weight: 89 kg (196 lb)

Playing career^{1}
Years	Club	Games (Goals)
1950–1959	Hawthorn	164 (29)

Coaching career^{3}
Years	Club	Games (W–L–D)
1957	Hawthorn	1 (0–1–0)
1960–1963	Hawthorn	77 (46–30–1)
1967–1976	Hawthorn	221 (135–85–1)
1985–1989	North Melbourne	113 (55–55–3)
Total		412 (236–171–5)
- ^{1} Playing statistics correct to the end of 1959.^{3} Coaching statistics correct as of 1989.

Career highlights
- Playing: 4× Hawthorn Best and Fairest: 1950–1952, 1954; Hawthorn Captain: 1955–1959; Coaching: 3× VFL premiership coach: 1961, 1971, 1976; Hawthorn Team of the Century – Coach; AFLCA Coaching Legend Award: 2009; Hall of Fame: Australian Football Hall of Fame – Legend status; Hawthorn Hall of Fame – Legend status

John James Kennedy Sr. (29 December 1928 – 24 June 2020) was an Australian rules footballer who played for the Hawthorn Football Club and coached Hawthorn and the North Melbourne Football Club in the Victorian Football League (VFL). He coached Hawthorn to premierships in 1961, 1971, and 1976.

== Early life/playing career ==
Kennedy was born in Camberwell, Victoria, on 29 December 1928. In 1950, he joined the Hawthorn Football Club as a ruckman. Over the next ten years, he played 164 games for Hawthorn, winning the club's Best and Fairest award four times (in 1950–1952, and 1954) and serving as captain from 1955 until his retirement in 1959.

== Coaching career ==
Kennedy received a rushed introduction to coaching in 1957 when regular coach Jack Hale was involved in a vehicle accident on the way to Glenferrie Oval and missed the Round 11 match.

He took over permanently as Hawthorn coach for the 1960 season and led the team to their first premiership in 1961. Following a Grand Final defeat to Geelong in 1963, he was forced to step down as coach when the Victorian Education Department offered him a job as a school principal in Stawell. Hawthorn's poor on-field performance over the next few years saw him recalled to the role in 1967. He coached Hawthorn to premierships in 1971 and 1976 and a Grand Final loss in 1975. He stepped down as coach again in 1976, in all coaching Hawthorn to three premierships from five Grand Finals.

In 1985, Kennedy became the coach of the North Melbourne Football Club, and coached the club until 1989; his best result with North Melbourne was fourth in 1985. In total he coached for 412 games, winning 236, losing 171, and drawing five.

== Statistics ==
=== Coaching statistics ===
Legend
W	Wins	L	Losses	D	Draws	W%	Winning percentage	LP	Ladder position	LT	League teams

Season	Team	Games	W	L	D	W %	LP	LT
1957	Hawthorn	1	0	1	0	0.0%	—N/a	12
1960	Hawthorn	18	11	7	0	61.1%	5	12
1961^{#}	Hawthorn	20	16	4	0	80.0%	1	12
1962	Hawthorn	18	5	13	0	38.5%	9	12
1963	Hawthorn	21	14	6	1	70.0%	1	12
1967	Hawthorn	18	5	13	0	38.5%	10	12
1968	Hawthorn	20	9	10	1	45.0%	6	12
1969	Hawthorn	20	13	7	0	65.0%	5	12
1970	Hawthorn	22	10	12	0	45.5%	8	12
1971^{#}	Hawthorn	24	21	3	0	87.5%	1	12
1972	Hawthorn	22	13	9	0	59.1%	6	12
1973	Hawthorn	22	11	11	0	50.0%	7	12
1974	Hawthorn	25	16	9	0	64.0%	3	12
1975	Hawthorn	24	18	6	0	75.0%	1	12
1976^{#}	Hawthorn	25	19	6	0	76.0%	2	12
1985	North Melbourne	24	14	9	1	58.3%	5	12
1986	North Melbourne	22	12	10	0	54.5%	7	12
1987	North Melbourne	23	13	9	1	56.5%	4	14
1988	North Melbourne	22	7	14	1	31.8%	11	14
1989	North Melbourne	22	9	13	0	40.9%	9	14
Career totals		412	236	171	5	57.3%		

== Honours and achievements ==
=== Playing ===
Individual

- 4× Hawthorn Best and Fairest: 1950, 1951, 1952, 1954
- Hawthorn captain: 1955–1959

=== Coaching ===
Team

- 3× VFL Premiership coach (Hawthorn): 1961, 1971, 1976
- 4× Minor premiership (Hawthorn): 1961, 1963, 1971, 1975
- 2× Night Series premiership (Hawthorn): 1968, 1969

Individual

- 3× Jock McHale Medal: 1961, 1971, 1976
- Hawthorn Team of the Century – Coach

=== Hall of Fame/Life membership ===
- Australian Football Hall of Fame – Legend status
- Hawthorn Hall of Fame – Legend status
- Hawthorn life member

== Legacy ==
As a player, Kennedy was renowned for his toughness and skill. As a coach, he had a similar reputation for toughness but also for oratory. He was notorious for borrowing ideas from any source he thought would inspire the players, but it was his passion rather than his quotations that he was best known for. In the 1975 VFL Grand Final against North Melbourne, his exhortation to the Hawthorn players at half-time was: "At least do something! Do! Don't think, Mick! Don't hope; do! At least you can come off and say, 'I did this, I shepherded, I played on. At least I did something.'" Despite this, his team still lost convincingly.

He was famous for his battered brown overcoat, which is now on display at the Hawthorn Football Club.

He was an inaugural inductee into the Australian Football Hall of Fame and was inducted into the Sport Australia Hall of Fame in 1999.

His son John Kennedy Jr., also played for the Hawks, playing eight matches against Kangaroo teams coached by his father. Kennedy's grandson Josh Kennedy was recruited by Hawthorn under the father/son rule in the 2006 AFL draft, but played most of his career with the Sydney Swans.

On 1 June 2020, John Kennedy Sr. became the 29th legend of the Australian Football Hall of Fame. AFL Commission Chairman Richard Goyder said: "In the Australian Football Hall of Fame, our Legends stand above our greats and, on behalf of the selectors, it is my great honour to declare John Kennedy was elected as a Legend, recognising his six-decade contribution to our game."

The Kennedy Community Centre, Hawthorn's new training and administrative base, is named after John Kennedy Sr.

=== Statue ===
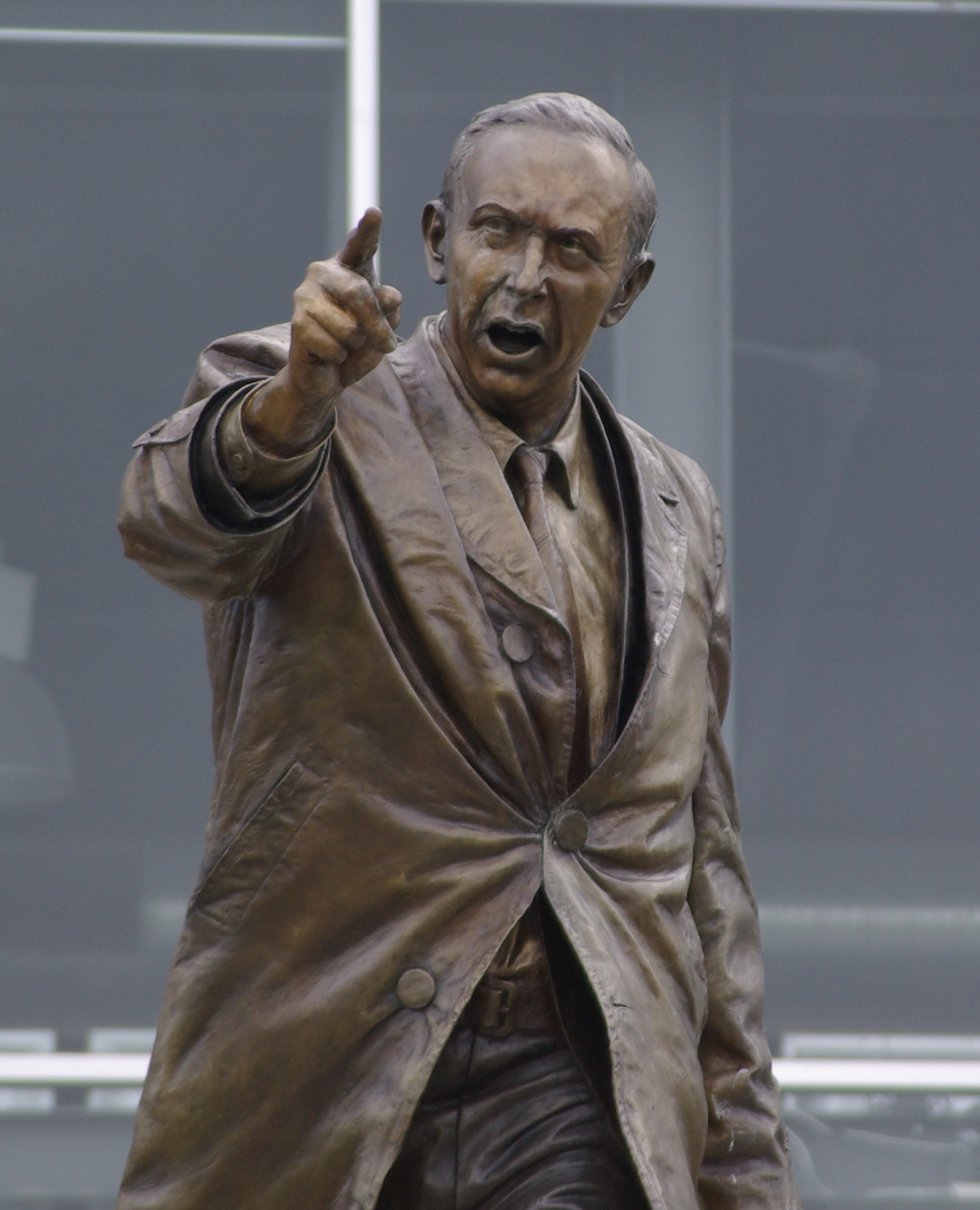
Bronze statue of Kennedy in front of Waverley Park

In honour of Kennedy's 80th birthday, a statue of him overlooking the Hawthorns' Waverley Park stadium was unveiled. The statue was moved to the Kennedy Community Centre in 2025. The text on the plaque reads:

John "Kanga" Kennedy played 164 games for the Hawthorn Football Club in 1950–59, including its first ever finals appearance in 1957. In 1960 aged just 31 Kennedy became coach and transformed Hawthorn and led the club to its first three premierships in 1961, 1971 and 1976.
Kennedy's Hawthorn teams became known as "Kennedy's Commandos". Wearing his trademark overcoat, his booming voice and stirring words inspired generations of Hawthorn players, taking them from easy beats to the most respected and revered club in the League.
He epitomised and taught all the values and attitudes that the Club cherishes. These were overwhelmingly a sense of TEAM, total DISCIPLINE, total INTEGRITY, and WILL to WIN at all costs. They are now core values, part of the club's character and as we compete in the 21st century this legacy as defined by John Kennedy will never be forgotten.

== Death ==
Kennedy died at the age of 91, on 24 June 2020, the day before his grandson Josh Kennedy was to play his 250th AFL game.
