= 1957 Night Series Cup =

- VFL Night Series Cup
- Season: 1957
- Teams: 12
- Winners: South Melbourne (2nd title)
- Runner up: Geelong
- Matches played: 11
- Attendance: 187,200 (average 17,018 per match)

The 1957 VFL Night Premiership Cup was the Victorian Football League end of season cup competition played in August, September and October of the 1957 VFL Premiership Season. This was the second edition that the VFL Night Series had existed with the competition expanding to feature all twelve teams. The games were being played at the Lake Oval, Albert Park, then the home ground of South Melbourne, as it was the only ground equipped to host night games.

In the final, South Melbourne took out their second night series cup, defeating Geelong by 51 points (15.13.103 to 8.4.52). This would later be the only edition until 1977 to feature all twelve teams at the time.

== Games ==
=== Round 1 ===
| Winning team | Winning team score | Losing team | Losing team score | Ground | Crowd | Date |
| South Melbourne | 15.19 (109) | St Kilda | 11.13 (79) | Lake Oval | 25,000 | Thursday, 29 August |
| Geelong | 13.13 (91) | Richmond | 9.12 (66) | Lake Oval | 14,000 | Tuesday, 3 September |
| North Melbourne | 9.13 (67) | Collingwood | 6.13 (49) | Lake Oval | 16,500 | Thursday, 5 September |
| Footscray | 16.17 (113) | Fitzroy | 12.8 (80) | Lake Oval | 16,500 | Tuesday, 10 September |

=== Round 2 ===
| Winning team | Winning team score | Losing team | Losing team score | Ground | Crowd | Date |
| South Melbourne | 8.14 (62) | Carlton | 6.11 (47) | Lake Oval | 25,000 | Thursday, 12 September |
| Footscray | 11.10 (76) | Hawthorn | 7.15 (57) | Lake Oval | 14,000 | Thursday, 19 September |
| Geelong | 11.18 (84) | North Melbourne | 10.12 (72) | Lake Oval | 8,100 | Tuesday, 24 September |
| Footscray | 11.16 (82) | Melbourne | 8.8 (56) | Lake Oval | 10,000 | Thursday, 26 September |

=== Semifinals ===
| Winning team | Winning team score | Losing team | Losing team score | Ground | Crowd | Date |
| Geelong | 10.11 (71) | Footscray | 6.9 (45) | Lake Oval | 14,600 | Thursday, 3 October |
| South Melbourne | 17.14 (116) | Essendon | 15.14 (104) | Lake Oval | 18,500 | Friday, 4 October |

=== Final ===
| Winning team | Winning team score | Losing team | Losing team score | Ground | Crowd | Date |
| South Melbourne | 15.13 (103) | Geelong | 8.4 (52) | Lake Oval | 25,000 | Monday, 7 October |

== See also ==
- List of VFL/AFL pre-season and night series premiers
- 1957 VFL season
