= 1965 Golden Fleece Cup =

- VFL Night Series Cup
- Season: 1965
- Teams: 8
- Winners: North Melbourne (1st title)
- Runner up: Carlton
- Matches played: 7
- Attendance: 153,635 (average 21,948 per match)

The 1965 VFL Golden Fleece Night Premiership was the Victorian Football League end of season cup competition played in September of the 1965 VFL Premiership Season. Run as a knock-out tournament, it was contested by the eight VFL teams that failed to make the 1965 VFL finals series. It was the tenth VFL Night Series competition. Games were played at the Lake Oval, Albert Park, then the home ground of South Melbourne, as it was the only ground equipped to host night games. This was the first time the Night Series cup had a naming rights sponsor in Golden Fleece petroleum products. North Melbourne won its first night series cup defeating Carlton in the final by 40 points.

== Games ==
=== Round 1 ===
Winning team	Winning team score	Losing team	Losing team score	Ground	Crowd	Date
Carlton	21.10 (136)	Melbourne	8.12 (60)	Lake Oval	23,500	Thursday, 2 September
Richmond	18.14 (122)	Fitzroy	8.9 (57)	Lake Oval	19,500	Tuesday, 7 September
Hawthorn	9.25 (79)	South Melbourne	9.10 (64)	Lake Oval	19,725	Thursday, 9 September
North Melbourne	13.12 (90)	Footscray	9.12 (66)	Lake Oval	15,880	Tuesday, 14 September

=== Semi-finals ===
Winning team	Winning team score	Losing team	Losing team score	Ground	Crowd	Date
Carlton	14.15 (99)	Richmond	5.10 (40)	Lake Oval	23,730	Thursday, 16 September
North Melbourne	13.10 (88)	Hawthorn	6.10 (46)	Lake Oval	13,550	Tuesday, 21 September

=== Final ===
Winning team	Winning team score	Losing team	Losing team score	Ground	Crowd	Date
North Melbourne	14.13 (97)	Carlton	9.3 (57)	Lake Oval	37,750	Monday, 27 September

== See also ==
- List of VFL/AFL pre-season and night series premiers
- 1965 VFL season
