= 1971 Heinz Cup =

- VFL Night Series Cup
- Season: 1971
- Teams: 8
- Winners: Melbourne (1st title)
- Runner up: Fitzroy
- Matches played: 7
- Attendance: 77,956 (average 11,137 per match)

The 1971 VFL H.J. Heinz Night Premiership was the Victorian Football League end of season cup competition played in September of the 1971 VFL Premiership Season. Run as a knock-out tournament, it was contested by the eight VFL teams that failed to make the 1971 VFL finals series. Games were played at the Lake Oval, Albert Park, then the home ground of South Melbourne, as it was the only ground equipped to host night games. It was the 16th and last VFL Night Series competition, with the series disbanded the following year due to waning interest and the introduction of the final five in the premiership competition. Melbourne won its first night series cup defeating Fitzroy in the final by 16 points.

== Games ==
=== Round 1 ===
| Winning team | Winning team score | Losing team | Losing team score | Ground | Crowd | Date |
| Footscray | 11.25 (91) | South Melbourne | 10.10 (70) | Lake Oval | 10,028 | Thursday, 2 September |
| Fitzroy | 14.16 (100) | North Melbourne | 8.10 (58) | Lake Oval | 7,280 | Tuesday, 7 September |
| Carlton | 9.15 (69) | Essendon | 9.6 (60) | Lake Oval | 7,328 | Thursday, 9 September |
| Melbourne | 19.20 (134) | Geelong | 11.8 (74) | Lake Oval | 8,108 | Tuesday, 14 September |

=== Semi-finals ===
| Winning team | Winning team score | Losing team | Losing team score | Ground | Crowd | Date |
| Fitzroy | 16.17 (113) | Footscray | 11.12 (78) | Lake Oval | 12,124 | Thursday, 16 September |
| Melbourne | 14.16 (100) | Carlton | 11.8 (74) | Lake Oval | 11,919 | Tuesday, 21 September |

=== Final ===
| Winning team | Winning team score | Losing team | Losing team score | Ground | Crowd | Date |
| Melbourne | 12.7 (79) | Fitzroy | 9.9 (63) | Lake Oval | 21,169 | Monday, 27 September |

== See also ==
- List of Australian Football League night premiers
- 1971 VFL season
