= 1958 Night Series Cup =

- VFL Night Series Cup
- Season: 1958
- Teams: 8
- Winners: St Kilda (1st title)
- Runner up: Carlton
- Matches played: 7
- Attendance: 107,750 (average 15,393 per match)

The 1958 VFL Night Premiership Cup was the Victorian Football League end of season cup competition played in August and September of the 1958 VFL Premiership Season. This was the third year the VFL Night Series had existed. In last years competition, each of the day finalists were duly defeated upon entry and their addition to the competition resulted in a drawn-out and complicated fixture of matches. The VFL thus elected to return to the original format for this year's competition as previously used in the 1956 Night Series Cup. Run as a knock-out tournament, it was contested by the eight VFL teams that failed to make the 1958 VFL finals series. Games were played at the Lake Oval, Albert Park, then the home ground of South Melbourne, as it was the only ground equipped to host night games. St Kilda went on to win the night series cup, defeating Carlton in the final by 8 points.

== Games ==
=== Round 1 ===
| Winning team | Winning team score | Losing team | Losing team score | Ground | Crowd | Date |
| Essendon | 16.16 (112) | Geelong | 11.19 (85) | Lake Oval | 6,800 | Thursday, 28 August |
| Carlton | 8.21 (69) | Richmond | 9.12 (66) | Lake Oval | 11,000 | Tuesday, 2 September |
| St Kilda | 17.10 (112) | Footscray | 12.13 (85) | Lake Oval | 14,000 | Thursday, 4 September |
| Hawthorn | 9.19 (73) | South Melbourne | 4.20 (44) | Lake Oval | 17,850 | Tuesday, 9 September |

=== Semifinals ===
| Winning team | Winning team score | Losing team | Losing team score | Ground | Crowd | Date |
| Carlton | 10.12 (72) | Essendon | 6.16 (52) | Lake Oval | 16,200 | Thursday, 11 September |
| St Kilda | 13.13 (91) | Hawthorn | 6.10 (46) | Lake Oval | 15,500 | Tuesday, 16 September |

=== Final ===
| Winning team | Winning team score | Losing team | Losing team score | Ground | Crowd | Date |
| St Kilda | 16.13 (109) | Carlton | 15.11 (101) | Lake Oval | 26,400 | Monday, 22 September |

== See also ==
- List of Australian Football League night premiers
- 1958 VFL season
