= 1966 Golden Fleece Cup =

- VFL Night Series Cup
- Season: 1966
- Teams: 8
- Winners: North Melbourne (2nd title)
- Runner up: Hawthorn
- Matches played: 7
- Attendance: 95,900 (average 13,700 per match)

The 1966 VFL Golden Fleece Night Premiership was the Victorian Football League end of season cup competition played in September of the 1966 VFL Premiership Season. Run as a knock-out tournament, it was contested by the eight VFL teams that failed to make the 1966 VFL finals series. It was the eleventh VFL Night Series competition. Games were played at the Lake Oval, Albert Park, then the home ground of South Melbourne, as it was the only ground equipped to host night games. North Melbourne won its second night series cup in a row defeating Hawthorn in the final by 53 points.

Three rule changes, all of which were eventually permanently adopted in the VFL, were trialled during this series:,

- A free kick was awarded against a player if the ball was kicked out of bounds on the full. Adopted in 1969.
- A 50yd square was drawn in the centre of the ground, and no more than four players from each team were allowed within the square during a centre bounce; this was to reduce congestion at centre bounces. Adopted in a modified form in 1973.
- The number of boundary umpires was increased from two to four. Adopted in 2008.

== Games ==
=== Round 1 ===
Winning team	Winning team score	Losing team	Losing team score	Ground	Crowd	Date
South Melbourne	14.12 (96)	Footscray	11.20 (86)	Lake Oval	15,700	Thursday, 1 September
North Melbourne	14.12 (96)	Fitzroy	11.10 (76)	Lake Oval	10,200	Tuesday, 6 September
Melbourne	10.13 (73)	Richmond	9.16 (70)	Lake Oval	13,800	Thursday, 8 September
Hawthorn	9.14 (68)	Carlton	9.5 (59)	Lake Oval	9,100	Thursday, 15 September

=== Semi-finals ===
Winning team	Winning team score	Losing team	Losing team score	Ground	Crowd	Date
North Melbourne	13.12 (90)	South Melbourne	12.15 (87)	Lake Oval	14,200	Monday, 19 September
Hawthorn	13.10 (88)	Melbourne	8.12 (60)	Lake Oval	10,100	Wednesday, 21 September

=== Final ===
Winning team	Winning team score	Losing team	Losing team score	Ground	Crowd	Date
North Melbourne	20.12 (132)	Hawthorn	12.7 (79)	Lake Oval	22,800	Monday, 26 September

== See also ==
- List of Australian Football League night premiers
- 1966 VFL season
