= 1963 Night Series Cup =

- VFL Night Series Cup
- Season: 1963
- Teams: 8
- Winners: Footscray (1st title)
- Runner up: Richmond
- Matches played: 7
- Attendance: 99,380 (average 14,197 per match)

The 1963 VFL Night Premiership Cup was the Victorian Football League end of season cup competition played in September and October of the 1963 VFL Premiership Season. Run as a knock-out tournament, it was contested by the eight VFL teams that failed to make the 1963 VFL finals series. It was the eighth VFL Night Series competition. Games were played at the Lake Oval, Albert Park, then the home ground of South Melbourne, as it was the only ground equipped to host night games. Footscray won its first night series cup defeating Richmond in the final by 6 points.

== Games ==
=== Round 1 ===
Winning team	Winning team score	Losing team	Losing team score	Ground	Crowd	Date
Collingwood	14.13 (97)	South Melbourne	9.11 (65)	Lake Oval	7,550	Tuesday, 10 September
Richmond	7.13 (55)	Essendon	6.11 (47)	Lake Oval	11,100	Friday, 13 September
Carlton	10.15 (75)	Fitzroy	6.8 (44)	Lake Oval	7,100	Monday, 16 September
Footscray	8.11 (59)	North Melbourne	7.11 (53)	Lake Oval	15,500	Friday, 20 September

=== Semi-finals ===
Winning team	Winning team score	Losing team	Losing team score	Ground	Crowd	Date
Richmond	11.6 (72)	Collingwood	6.10 (46)	Lake Oval	17,480	Monday, 23 September
Footscray	11.7 (73)	Carlton	4.6 (30)	Lake Oval	15,380	Wednesday, 25 September

=== Final ===
Winning team	Winning team score	Losing team	Losing team score	Ground	Crowd	Date
Footscray	10.9 (69)	Richmond	9.9 (63)	Lake Oval	25,270	Monday, 2 October

== See also ==
- List of VFL/AFL pre-season and night series premiers
- 1963 VFL season
