= 1967 Golden Fleece Cup =

- VFL Night Series Cup
- Season: 1967
- Teams: 8
- Winners: Footscray (3rd title)
- Runner up: South Melbourne
- Matches played: 7
- Attendance: 93,444 (average 13,349 per match)

The 1967 VFL Golden Fleece Night Premiership was the Victorian Football League end of season cup competition played in August and September of the 1967 VFL Premiership Season. Run as a knock-out tournament, it was contested by the eight VFL teams that failed to make the 1967 VFL finals series. It was the twelfth VFL Night Series competition. Games were played at the Lake Oval, Albert Park, then the home ground of South Melbourne, as it was the only ground equipped to host night games. Footscray won its third night series cup defeating South Melbourne in the final by 45 points.

== Games ==
=== Round 1 ===
Winning team	Winning team score	Losing team	Losing team score	Ground	Crowd	Date
South Melbourne	10.21 (81)	Fitzroy	8.19 (67)	Lake Oval	10,453	Thursday, 31 August
Essendon	15.11 (101)	Hawthorn	7.9 (51)	Lake Oval	9,429	Tuesday, 5 September
Footscray	9.10 (64)	St Kilda	8.15 (63)	Lake Oval	15,000	Thursday, 7 September
North Melbourne	13.15 (93)	Melbourne	13.10 (88)	Lake Oval	9,404	Tuesday, 12 September

=== Semi-finals ===
Winning team	Winning team score	Losing team	Losing team score	Ground	Crowd	Date
South Melbourne	12.4 (76)	Essendon	7.9 (51)	Lake Oval	13,145	Thursday, 14 September
Footscray	13.15 (93)	North Melbourne	8.15 (63)	Lake Oval	9,282	Tuesday, 19 September

=== Final ===
Winning team	Winning team score	Losing team	Losing team score	Ground	Crowd	Date
Footscray	15.11 (101)	South Melbourne	8.8 (56)	Lake Oval	26,731	Monday, 25 September

== See also ==
- List of Australian Football League night premiers
- 1967 VFL season
