= 1970 Radiant Cup =

- VFL Night Series Cup
- Season: 1970
- Teams: 8
- Winners: Footscray (4th title)
- Runner up: Melbourne
- Matches played: 7
- Attendance: 86,505 (average 12,358 per match)

The 1970 VFL Radiant Night Premiership was the Victorian Football League end of season cup competition played in September of the 1970 VFL Premiership Season. Run as a knock-out tournament, it was contested by the eight VFL teams that failed to make the 1970 VFL finals series. It was the 15th VFL Night Series competition. Games were played at the Lake Oval, Albert Park, then the home ground of South Melbourne, as it was the only ground equipped to host night games. Footscray won its fourth night series cup defeating Melbourne in the final by 2 points.

== Games ==
=== Round 1 ===
Winning team	Winning team score	Losing team	Losing team score	Ground	Crowd	Date
Melbourne	15.16 (106)	Richmond	14.9 (93)	Lake Oval	10,591	Thursday, 3 September
Hawthorn	16.25 (121)	Essendon	7.10 (52)	Lake Oval	6,656	Tuesday, 8 September
Footscray	14.13 (97)	North Melbourne	6.7 (43)	Lake Oval	7,906	Thursday, 10 September
Fitzroy	11.19 (85) (Note: The match was decided after extra time; scores were level at 11.18 (84) to 12.12 (84) after the conclusion of regular time.)	Geelong	12.12 (84)	Lake Oval	6,035	Tuesday, 15 September

=== Semi-finals ===
Winning team	Winning team score	Losing team	Losing team score	Ground	Crowd	Date
Melbourne	11.12 (78)	Footscray	11.11 (77)	Lake Oval	23,882	Thursday, 17 September
Footscray	19.17 (121)	Fitzroy	12.16 (88)	Lake Oval	7,553	Tuesday, 22 September

=== Final ===
Winning team	Winning team score	Losing team	Losing team score	Ground	Crowd	Date
Footscray	13.17 (95)	Melbourne	13.15 (93)	Lake Oval	23,882	Monday, 28 September

== See also ==
- List of VFL/AFL pre-season and night series premiers
- 1970 VFL season
