= 1961 Night Series Cup =

- VFL Night Series Cup
- Season: 1961
- Teams: 8
- Winners: Geelong (1st title)
- Runner up: North Melbourne
- Matches played: 7
- Attendance: 152,119 (average 21,731 per match)

The 1961 VFL Night Premiership Cup was the Victorian Football League end of season cup competition played in August and September of the 1961 VFL Premiership Season. This was the sixth season of the VFL Night Series. Run as a knock-out tournament, it was contested by the eight VFL teams that failed to make the 1961 VFL finals series. Games were played at the Lake Oval, Albert Park, then the home ground of South Melbourne, as it was the only ground equipped to host night games. Geelong won its first night series cup defeating North Melbourne in the final by 12 points.

== Games ==
=== Round 1 ===
Winning team	Winning team score	Losing team	Losing team score	Ground	Crowd	Date
Collingwood	14.14 (98)	Fitzroy	11.13 (79)	Lake Oval	16,222	Thursday, 31 August
North Melbourne	14.12 (96)	Essendon	11.15 (81)	Lake Oval	17,854	Tuesday, 5 September
Geelong	13.7 (85)	South Melbourne	12.8 (80)	Lake Oval	21,760	Thursday, 7 September
Carlton	12.12 (84)	Richmond	5.8 (38)	Lake Oval	23,468	Tuesday, 12 September

=== Semifinals ===
Winning team	Winning team score	Losing team	Losing team score	Ground	Crowd	Date
North Melbourne	14.10 (94)	Collingwood	10.8 (68)	Lake Oval	15,110	Friday, 15 September
Geelong	14.12 (96)	Carlton	10.11 (71)	Lake Oval	27,240	Tuesday, 19 September

=== Final ===
Winning team	Winning team score	Losing team	Losing team score	Ground	Crowd	Date
Geelong	9.20 (74)	North Melbourne	9.8 (62)	Lake Oval	30,465	Monday, 25 September

== See also ==
- List of VFL/AFL pre-season and night series premiers
- 1961 VFL season
