= 1959 Night Series Cup =

Australian football competition

- VFL Night Series Cup
- Season: 1959
- Teams: 8
- Winners: Fitzroy (1st title)
- Runner up: Hawthorn
- Matches played: 7
- Attendance: 76,200 (average 10,886 per match)

The 1959 VFL Night Premiership Cup was the Victorian Football League end of season cup competition played in September of the 1959 VFL Premiership Season. This was the fourth season of the VFL Night Series. Run as a knock-out tournament, it was contested by the eight VFL teams that failed to make the 1959 VFL finals series. Games were played at the South Melbourne Cricket Ground, Albert Park, then the home ground of South Melbourne, as it was the only ground equipped to host night games. Fitzroy went on to win the night series cup, defeating Hawthorn in the final by 30 points.

== Games ==
=== Round 1 ===
Winning team	Winning team score	Losing team	Losing team score	Ground	Crowd	Date
South Melbourne	17.10 (112)	North Melbourne	13.14 (92)	Lake Oval	15,800	Thursday, 3 September
Hawthorn	11.17 (83)	St Kilda	4.7 (31)	Lake Oval	12,400	Monday, 7 September
Geelong	9.16 (70)	Footscray	9.11 (65)	Lake Oval	12,000	Thursday, 10 September
Fitzroy	19.18 (132)	Richmond	6.11 (47)	Lake Oval	2,600	Monday, 14 September

=== Semifinals ===
Winning team	Winning team score	Losing team	Losing team score	Ground	Crowd	Date
Hawthorn	13.14 (92)	South Melbourne	13.10 (88)	Lake Oval	16,100	Thursday, 17 September
Fitzroy	10.16 (76)	Geelong	6.14 (50)	Lake Oval	8,100	Tuesday, 22 September

=== Final ===
Winning team	Winning team score	Losing team	Losing team score	Ground	Crowd	Date
Fitzroy	10.10 (70)	Hawthorn	4.16 (40)	Lake Oval	9,200	Monday, 28 September

== See also ==
- List of VFL/AFL pre-season and night series premiers
- 1959 VFL season
