= 1969 Golden Fleece Cup =

- VFL Night Series Cup
- Season: 1969
- Teams: 8
- Winners: Hawthorn (1st title)
- Runner up: North Melbourne
- Matches played: 7
- Attendance: 79,622 (average 11,375 per match)

The 1969 VFL Golden Fleece Night Premiership was the Victorian Football League end of season cup competition played in September of the 1969 VFL Premiership Season. Run as a knock-out tournament, it was contested by the eight VFL teams that failed to make the 1969 VFL finals series. It was the 14th VFL Night Series competition. Games were played at the Lake Oval, Albert Park, then the home ground of South Melbourne, as it was the only ground equipped to host night games. Hawthorn won its second night series cup in a row, defeating Melbourne in the final by 5 points.

== Games ==
=== Round 1 ===
Winning team	Winning team score	Losing team	Losing team score	Ground	Crowd	Date
Footscray	13.13 (91)	South Melbourne	12.9 (81)	Lake Oval	13,917	Thursday, 4 September
Melbourne	11.16 (82)	St Kilda	8.21 (69)	Lake Oval	9,050	Tuesday, 9 September
Fitzroy	15.11 (101)	Essendon	14.11 (95)	Lake Oval	5,432	Friday, 12 September
Hawthorn	16.21 (117)	North Melbourne	11.21 (87)	Lake Oval	10,287	Tuesday, 16 September

=== Semi-finals ===
Winning team	Winning team score	Losing team	Losing team score	Ground	Crowd	Date
Melbourne	7.14 (56)	Footscray	6.15 (51)	Lake Oval	12,516	Thursday, 18 September
Hawthorn	18.12 (120)	Fitzroy	18.10 (118)	Lake Oval	7,353	Wednesday, 24 September

=== Final ===
Winning team	Winning team score	Losing team	Losing team score	Ground	Crowd	Date
Hawthorn	10.17 (77)	Melbourne	9.18 (72)	Lake Oval	21,067	Monday, 29 September

== See also ==
- List of VFL/AFL pre-season and night series premiers
- 1969 VFL season
