= 1964 Night Series Cup =

Victorian Football League

- VFL Night Series Cup
- Season: 1964
- Teams: 8
- Winners: Footscray (2nd title)
- Runner up: St Kilda
- Matches played: 7
- Attendance: 128,360 (average 18,337 per match)

The 1964 VFL Night Premiership Cup was the Victorian Football League end of season cup competition played in August and September of the 1964 VFL Premiership Season. Run as a knock-out tournament, it was contested by the eight VFL teams that failed to make the 1964 VFL finals series. It was the ninth VFL Night Series competition. Games were played at the Lake Oval, Albert Park, then the home ground of South Melbourne, as it was the only ground equipped to host night games. Footscray won its second consecutive night series cup defeating St Kilda in the final by 5 points.

== Games ==
=== Round 1 ===
Winning team	Winning team score	Losing team	Losing team score	Ground	Crowd	Date
St Kilda	12.12 (84)	Richmond	9.7 (61)	Lake Oval	12,000	Thursday, 27 August
Carlton	17.10 (112)	Fitzroy	11.6 (72)	Lake Oval	10,840	Tuesday, 1 September
Footscray	15.15 (105)	South Melbourne	11.6 (72)	Lake Oval	18,150	Thursday, 3 September
Hawthorn	10.13 (73)	North Melbourne	7.13 (55)	Lake Oval	15,250	Tuesday, 8 September

=== Semi-finals ===
Winning team	Winning team score	Losing team	Losing team score	Ground	Crowd	Date
St Kilda	6.10 (46)	Carlton	5.15 (45)	Lake Oval	17,100	Thursday, 10 September
Footscray	8.12 (60)	Hawthorn	4.10 (34)	Lake Oval	18,720	Tuesday, 15 September

=== Final ===
Winning team	Winning team score	Losing team	Losing team score	Ground	Crowd	Date
Footscray	11.12 (78)	St Kilda	11.7 (73)	Lake Oval	36,300	Monday, 21 September

== See also ==
- List of VFL/AFL pre-season and night series premiers
- 1964 VFL season
