= 1968 Golden Fleece Cup =

- VFL Night Series Cup
- Season: 1968
- Teams: 8
- Winners: Hawthorn (1st title)
- Runner up: North Melbourne
- Matches played: 7
- Attendance: 89,439 (average 12,777 per match)

The 1968 VFL Golden Fleece Night Premiership was the Victorian Football League end of season cup competition played in September and October of the 1968 VFL Premiership Season. Run as a knock-out tournament, it was contested by the eight VFL teams that failed to make the 1968 VFL finals series. It was the 13th VFL Night Series competition. Games were played at the Lake Oval, Albert Park, then the home ground of South Melbourne, as it was the only ground equipped to host night games. Hawthorn won its first night series cup defeating North Melbourne in the final by 61 points.

== Games ==
=== Round 1 ===
| Winning team | Winning team score | Losing team | Losing team score | Ground | Crowd | Date |
| Collingwood | 16.10 (106) | Fitzroy | 10.22 (82) | Lake Oval | 14,285 | Thursday, 5 September |
| Hawthorn | 11.14 (80) | Melbourne | 11.9 (75) | Lake Oval | 12,059 | Tuesday, 10 September |
| North Melbourne | 18.19 (127) | Sydney | 18.7 (115) | Lake Oval | 10,020 | Thursday, 12 September |
| Richmond | 15.15 (105) (Note: The match was decided after extra time; scores were level at 15.15 (104) to 16.8 (104) after the conclusion of regular time.) | Footscray | 16.8 (104) | Lake Oval | 15,037 | Tuesday, 17 September |

=== Semi-finals ===
| Winning team | Winning team score | Losing team | Losing team score | Ground | Crowd | Date |
| Hawthorn | 19.14 (128) | Collingwood | 14.10 (94) | Lake Oval | 15,336 | Thursday, 19 September |
| North Melbourne | 18.11 (119) | Richmond | 12.17 (89) | Lake Oval | 7,052 | Tuesday, 24 September |

=== Final ===
| Winning team | Winning team score | Losing team | Losing team score | Ground | Crowd | Date |
| Hawthorn | 16.15 (111) | North Melbourne | 6.14 (50) | Lake Oval | 15,650 | Wednesday, 2 October |

== See also ==
- List of Australian Football League night premiers
- 1968 VFL season
