= 1962 Night Series Cup =

- VFL Night Series Cup
- Season: 1962
- Teams: 8
- Winners: Richmond (1st title)
- Runner up: Hawthorn
- Matches played: 7
- Attendance: 111,710 (average 15,959 per match)

The 1962 VFL Night Premiership Cup was the Victorian Football League end of season cup competition played in August and September of the 1962 VFL Premiership Season. Run as a knock-out tournament, it was contested by the eight VFL teams that failed to make the 1962 VFL finals series. It was the seventh VFL Night Series competition. Games were played at the Lake Oval, Albert Park, then the home ground of South Melbourne, as it was the only ground equipped to host night games. Richmond won its first night series cup defeating Hawthorn in the final by 4 points.

== Games ==
=== Round 1 ===
Winning team	Winning team score	Losing team	Losing team score	Ground	Crowd	Date
North Melbourne	9.11 (65)	South Melbourne	3.14 (32)	Lake Oval	13,500	Friday, 31 August
Richmond	12.9 (81)	Fitzroy	3.14 (32)	Lake Oval	11,600	Tuesday, 4 September
Collingwood	16.16 (112)	St Kilda	10.9 (69)	Lake Oval	11,300	Friday, 7 September
Hawthorn	11.21 (87)	Footscray	9.10 (64)	Lake Oval	13,560	Tuesday, 11 September

=== Semi-finals ===
Winning team	Winning team score	Losing team	Losing team score	Ground	Crowd	Date
Richmond	12.13 (85)	North Melbourne	9.8 (62)	Lake Oval	17,100	Friday, 14 September
Hawthorn	18.13 (121)	Collingwood	7.7 (49)	Lake Oval	20,100	Tuesday, 18 September

=== Final ===
Winning team	Winning team score	Losing team	Losing team score	Ground	Crowd	Date
Richmond	8.16 (64)	Hawthorn	9.6 (60)	Lake Oval	24,550	Wednesday, 26 September

== See also ==
- List of VFL/AFL pre-season and night series premiers
- 1962 VFL season
