= 1960 Night Series Cup =

- VFL Night Series Cup
- Season: 1960
- Teams: 8
- Winners: South Melbourne (3rd title)
- Runner up: Hawthorn
- Matches played: 7
- Attendance: 93,100 (average 13,300 per match)

The 1960 VFL Night Premiership Cup was the Victorian Football League end of season cup competition played in September of the 1960 VFL Premiership Season. This was the fifth season of the VFL Night Series. Run as a knock-out tournament, it was contested by the eight VFL teams that failed to make the 1960 VFL finals series. Games were played at the Lake Oval, Albert Park, then the home ground of South Melbourne, as it was the only ground equipped to host night games. South Melbourne went on to win the night series cup for the third time, defeating Hawthorn in the final by 13 points.

== Games ==
=== Round 1 ===
Winning team	Winning team score	Losing team	Losing team score	Ground	Crowd	Date
South Melbourne	7.13 (55)	Footscray	7.10 (52)	Lake Oval	15,800	Thursday, 1 September
Richmond	7.9 (51)	Carlton	6.10 (46)	Lake Oval	10,600	Tuesday, 6 September
Geelong	8.11 (59)	St Kilda	6.5 (41)	Lake Oval	5,600	Thursday, 8 September
Hawthorn	17.21 (123)	North Melbourne	9.7 (61)	Lake Oval	9,800	Tuesday, 13 September

=== Semifinals ===
Winning team	Winning team score	Losing team	Losing team score	Ground	Crowd	Date
South Melbourne	11.14 (80)	Richmond	6.15 (51)	Lake Oval	16,800	Thursday, 15 September
Hawthorn	14.20 (104)	Geelong	6.8 (44)	Lake Oval	14,500	Tuesday, 20 September

=== Final ===
Winning team	Winning team score	Losing team	Losing team score	Ground	Crowd	Date
South Melbourne	10.12 (72)	Hawthorn	8.11 (59)	Lake Oval	20,000	Tuesday, 27 September

== See also ==
- List of VFL/AFL pre-season and night series premiers
- 1960 VFL season
