= 1956 Night Series Cup =

- VFL Night Series Cup
- Season: 1956
- Teams: 8
- Winners: South Melbourne (1st title)
- Runner up: Carlton
- Matches played: 7
- Attendance: 143,150 (average 20,450 per match)

The 1956 VFL Night Premiership Cup was the Victorian Football League end of season cup competition played between the eight teams that didn't make the finals of that season. It was held between 23 August to 17 September 1956 with games being played at the Lake Oval, home ground of South Melbourne as it was the only ground equipped to host night games.

Eight teams played in the first competition with the final seeing an attendance of 32,450 as South Melbourne defeated Carlton in the final by 6 points (13.16.94 to 13.10.88).

== Games ==
=== Quarterfinals ===
The opening match of the 1956 edition saw South Melbourne record the first victory of the new competition by 20 points over St Kilda. But the match was remembered for the brawl that happened in the third quarter which featured all of the players, umpires and some spectators in scenes not since the 1945 VFL Grand Final between Carlton and South Melbourne. The following match which was played five days later saw a surprise victory by North Melbourne who defeated Essendon by two points with North Melbourne leading at every change to get the win. Richmond and Carlton also recorded narrow wins over Hawthorn and Fitzroy in the remaining two quarter-finals which was played on 30 August and the 4 September.

	Quarterfinals
Thursday 23 August	South Melbourne 13.15 (93)	def.	St Kilda 10.13 (73)	Lake Oval (crowd: 14,000)
Tuesday 28 August	North Melbourne 8.13 (61)	def.	Essendon 8.11 (59)	Lake Oval (crowd: 13,000)
Thursday 30 August	Richmond 12.10 (82)	def.	Hawthorn 9.19 (73)	Lake Oval (crowd: 15,200)
Tuesday 4 September	Carlton 13.18 (96)	def.	Fitzroy 12.10 (82)	Lake Oval (crowd: 25,000)

=== Semifinals ===
The semi-finals began on the 6 September with South Melbourne taking on North Melbourne. In another tight tussle between the teams, it was not until late on in the final quarter with the usage of the wind that South Melbourne would take the win with a goal from Monks sealing the five point victory. In the second semi-final, an attendance of 25,500 saw Carlton win the match by 12 points in what The Age called fast, rugged and exciting football with Carlton leading at each break to record the victory.

	Semifinals
Thursday 6 September	South Melbourne 9.13 (67)	def.	North Melbourne 8.14 (62)	Lake Oval (crowd: 17,500)
Wednesday 12 September	Richmond 9.15 (69)	def. by	Carlton 11.15 (81)	Lake Oval (crowd: 25,500)

=== Final ===
The final of the 1956 edition was played on the 17 September 1956 between South Melbourne and Carlton. With an attendance of 32,450 watching the match, South Melbourne's win was credited in the second quarter when they outscored Carlton 4.2 to 0.3 to open up a thirty-one point lead. Carlton tried to come back into the match throughout the final quarter and had a chance to take the lead but a dropped pass from Hands would give South Melbourne the win by six points and become the first winners of the Night Series Cup.

	Final
Monday 17 September	South Melbourne 13.16 (94)	def.	Carlton 13.10 (88)	Lake Oval (crowd: 32,450)

== See also ==
- List of Australian Football League night premiers
- 1956 VFL season
