= Glenferrie Oval =

Australian rules football stadium in Hawthorn, Victoria

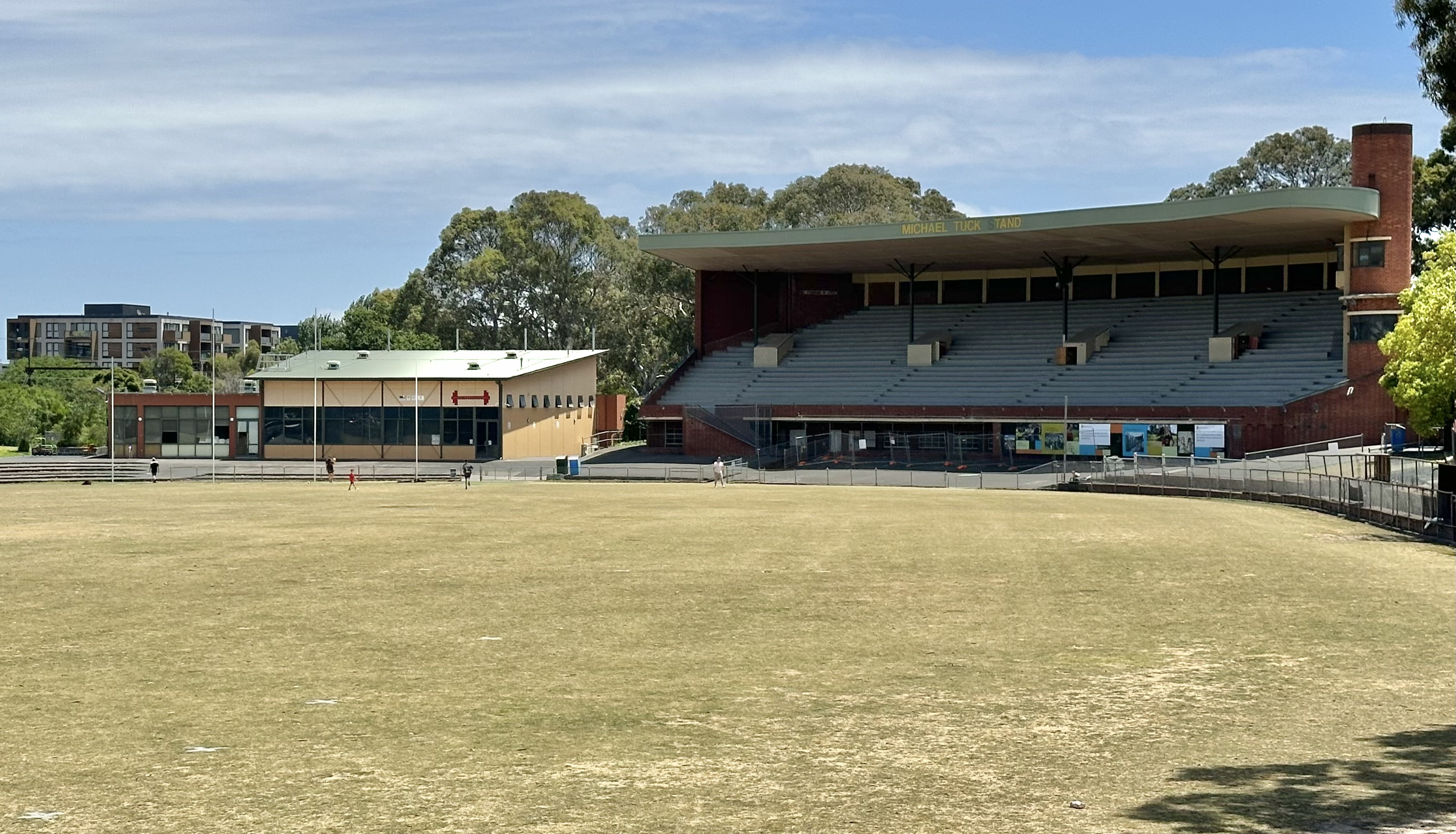
- Glenferrie Oval in January 2026
- Interactive map of Glenferrie Oval
- Former names: Hawthorn City Football Ground
- Address: 34 Linda Crescent; Hawthorn, Victoria
- Coordinates: 37°49′14″S 145°1′58″E
- Owner: City of Boroondara
- Operator: City of Boroondara
- Capacity: 10,000
- Record attendance: 36,767 (Hawthorn vs Carlton, 17 April 1965)
- Field size: 160 m × 105 m (525 ft × 344 ft)

Construction
- Opened: 1903; 123 years ago

Tenants
- Hawthorn Football Club; Administration & Training (1906–2006); VFL/AFL (1906–1973)
- Building details
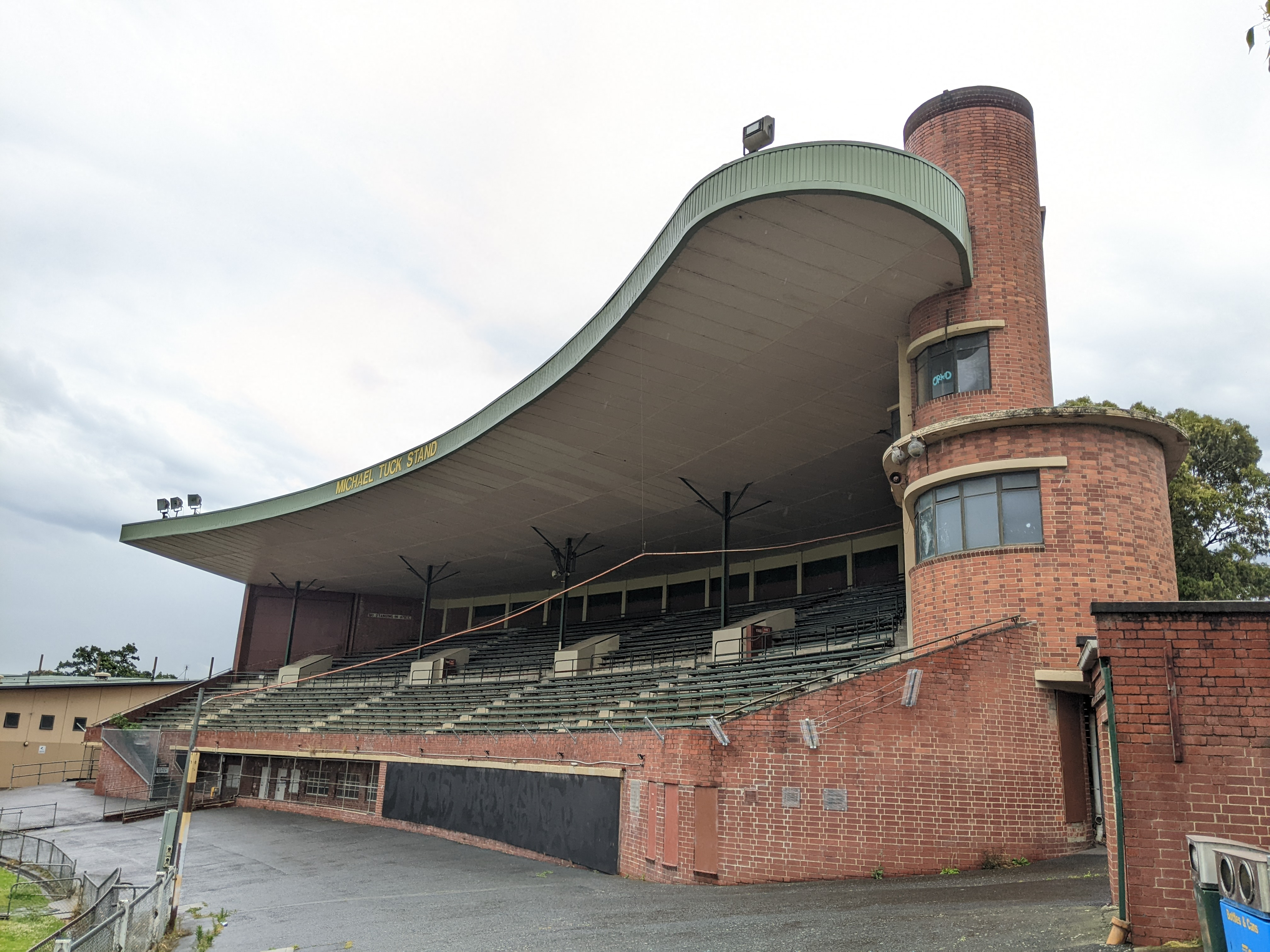
- Michael Tuck Grandstand in 2022

General information
- Status: Completed
- Type: Grandstand
- Architectural style: Moderne
- Named for: Michael Tuck
- Completed: 1938; 88 years ago

Victorian Heritage Register
- Official name: Glenferrie Oval Grandstand
- Type: Registered Place
- Designated: 30 September 1992
- Reference no.: H0890
- Heritage overlay no.: HO83
- Category: Recreation and Entertainment

Glenferrie Oval is an Australian rules football stadium located in the Melbourne suburb of Hawthorn. It is synonymous with the Hawthorn Football Club, which played at the ground from 1903 until 1973 and retained the ground as an administrative and training base until 2006.

== History ==
Prior to adopting Glenferrie Oval as the club's traditional home, the Hawthorn Football Club had a nomadic history, playing home games at whatever the most suitable obtainable ground was for that season. Their first home ground was the Hawthorn Cricket Ground, which was abandoned after just one season due to conditions imposed by the Hawthorn Cricket Club, with the Hawks playing at John Wren's Richmond Racecourse in 1903 (which was off Bridge Road between Stawell Street and Westbank Terrace – where Tudor Street with five no-through streets branches of are now located), before moving to the Richmond Cricket Ground in 1904.

The Hawks' merger with Boroondara in 1905 had them move to Boroondara's ground, which at the time was the East Melbourne Cricket Ground. Hawthorn dropped their colours of blue and red (similar to Melbourne's guernsey at the time) and adopted Boroondara's colours, which was a black guernsey with red sash but retained the name Hawthorn FC.

When the Hawthorn council opened Glenferrie Oval, then known as the Hawthorn City Sports Ground in October 1905, they endeavored to get a senior club to represent the district to be the main tenant during the next football season. The Hawthorn FC, competing in the Metropolitan Junior Football Association (now known as the VAFA), and Hawthorn Rovers (a popular club in the Eastern Suburbs Association) merged to form the Hawthorn City Football Club and made Glenferrie their home ground (the word City was later dropped and the club was just known as the Hawthorn Football Club when it entered the VFA in 1914).

Between 1906 and 1973, the Hawks played their home games at Glenferrie Oval, which was located in the heart of the affluent suburb of Hawthorn. The state of Glenferrie Oval and its location, close by the Glenferrie train station on the Melbourne East route, was a central reason why the club was firstly accepted into the VFA in 1914, and then the VFL in 1925. The club's onfield results had not reached any great heights in those early days but both the VFA and VFL had recognised the importance for representation in the suburbs east of the Yarra River. Glenferrie Oval was pivotal in these advancements of the Hawthorn Football Club as it was considered the most suitable at the time.

In 1914, when Hawthorn entered the VFA, the council was required to build a new dressing shed to meet the standards of the VFA competition. These dressing sheds were erected in the north-west corner of the ground, where the Tuck Stand now resides, and were later moved to the Rathmines Road Reserve in Hawthorn East where it still exists today. In 1922 the ground was widened by 30 yards and lengthened westward by 50 yards - taking in the previous outer reserve ground - to the dimensions that remain today.

The 1922 ground improvements also resulted in Glenferrie Oval's first main stand, which was a wooden structure to be known as the Kennon-Owen Stand, and had been purchased from the East Melbourne Cricket Ground in late 1921 when that ground was closed due to expansion of the Jolimont railyards. The Kennon-Owen Stand was replaced by the Dr Ferguson Stand, a new brick stand opened in 1966 which was 185 feet long and could seat 1,450 people, with 400 undercover. It was later to be home of the Past Players Association and the original museum. The northern part of the Ferguson Stand was demolished to make way for the Victorian Weightlifting Building.

Glenferrie Oval's grandstand, designed in the Moderne style, was built in 1938 and later named the Michael Tuck Stand after club great Michael Tuck, and housed the new changerooms and administration of the club. The structure was added to the Victorian Heritage Register in 1992. In 1963, the large scoreboard was erected at the eastern end of the ground. After the club won the 1961 premiership it was decided to buy some houses on the other side of Linda Crescent to build the Social Club which opened in 1962.

The ground was relatively small by VFL standards, but the intimate nature of the ground (with the grandstands and train line surrounding the ground) made for a terrific atmosphere. The Hawks had played 584 matches at Glenferrie Oval during their time there. The last game that Hawthorn played at Glenferrie Oval was on 1 September 1973 when Hawthorn won against South Melbourne by 37 points, in front of a crowd of 9,842 people.

The Swinburne University Football Club played its home matches at Glenferrie Oval in the Victorian Amateur Football Association (VAFA) from 1996 until moving to St James Park in the 2000s.

Hawthorn Football Club retained the ground as an administrative and training base until 2006. Hawthorn moved their administrative and training facilities to a redeveloped Waverley Park early in 2006 in preparation for the 2006 AFL season.

=== Modern day ===
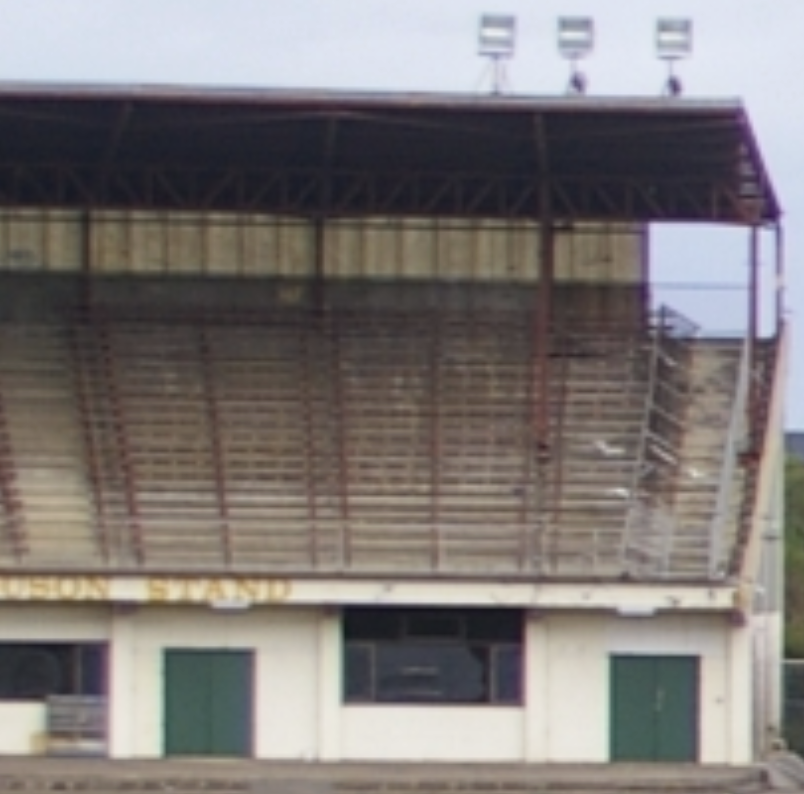
The Dr Ferguson Stand, which was opened in 1966 and demolished in 2023

The ground is open to the general public, and is used for a variety of recreation and leisure activities. In March 2010 the playing field was resurfaced with couch grass for public use. The Hawthorn Football Club continued to host supporters' days at the ground if they won the AFL premiership, for instance drawing crowds of several thousand people in 2014.

The City of Boroondara is currently in the process of revitalising the precinct. The Ferguson Stand was demolished in 2023, with the Boroondara City Council planning on creating a new public open space where the Ferguson Stand once stood, as well as planning to refurbish the Michael Tuck Stand. Following this, it the ground will again be used for senior VAFA matches.

== Ground facilities ==
The location of the ground has always been expansion prohibitive, wedged between the Belgrave/Lilydale railway line and nearby side streets. The small size and narrow wings of the ground led to it being known as the "sardine can" amongst fans.

The ground includes:

- the Michael Tuck Stand, named in honour of Hawthorn legend Michael Tuck and completed in 1938 in the Moderne style, added to the Victorian Heritage Register on 30 September 1992 in recognition of its historic and architectural significance.
- the Victorian Weightlifting Stadium
- the social club (1963), sold by the Hawthorn Football Club in 2008 and subsequently demolished
- the Ferguson Stand (1960s), demolished in 2023

== See also ==
- Kennedy Community Centre
- Waverley Park
