= 1925 Hawthorn Football Club season =

First season in the Victorian Football League

Hawthorn Football Club
1925 season
- President: J.W. Kennon
- Coach: Alex Hall
- Captain(s): Jim Jackson
- Home ground: Glenferrie Oval
- VFL season: 3–14 (12th)
- Finals series: Did not qualify
- Best and Fairest: Fred Finch
- Leading goalkicker: Les Woodford (20)
- Highest home attendance: 20,000 (Round 1 vs. Richmond)
- Lowest home attendance: 6,000 (Round 11 vs. Melbourne)
- Average home attendance: 10,750

The 1925 Hawthorn Football Club season first edition of the Hawthorn Football Club in the Victorian Football League and 24th overall. The club was allowed entry to join the VFL crossing over from the Victorian Football Association. Alex Hall was the first coach for the VFL team while Jim Jackson was the first captain.

The club's first match in the Victorian Football League were against the Richmond at the Glenferrie Oval on the 2 May 1925. The club finished 3–14 in their first season which placed them 12th and last on the ladder, receiving the wooden spoon.

Hawthorn's best and fairest was awarded to Fred Finch while Les Woodford was the leading goalkicker with twenty goals for the season.

== Roster ==
Hawthorn Football Club
Senior list		Coaching staff
1 Jim Jackson (c); 2 Cyril Nott; 3 Stan McKenzie; 4 Hec Yeomans; 5 Les Woodford; 6 Paddy Burke; 7 Clem Splatt; 8 Jim McCashney; 9 Arthur Pearson; 10 Fred Brown; 11 Fred Finch; 12 Ern Utting; 12 Pat Kennedy; 14 Jack Gill; 15 Jack Pickford; 16 Clarrie Lethlean; 17 Gil Hendrie; 18 Les Carbarns; 19 George Bolt; 20 Reg Whitehead	20 Bert McComb; 21 Bert Officer; 22 Mick Ennis; 23 Dave Elliman; 24 Roy Donovan; 24 Syd James; 25 Bob Sellers; 26 Bert Calwell; 27 Jack Price; 28 Wal Williams; 29 Pat Keary; 30 Lew Gough; 31 Martin Larkin; 32 Bert Hyde	Head coach: Alex Hall; Legend: (c) Captain(s); (vc) Vice-captain(s); Updated: 3 October 2016; Source(s): AFL Tables

== Season summary ==
Hawthorn began their 1925 season on the 2 May against Richmond at Glenferrie Oval as one of the three new teams competing (the others being North Melbourne and Footscray. In the opening game, they scored the first VFL goal, from Hec Yeomans, although they would lose by 39 points. The following week they suffered a 54 point loss to St Kilda. It would not be until Round 5, that Hawthorn would record their first victory in the VFL as Les Woodford scored three goals in a sixteen point victory over fellow newcomers Footscray who was missing seven players from the previous week. The following week would see Hawthorn give up a seventeen point lead at the half time break to lose by four points at Arden Street Oval to North Melbourne.

That loss to North Melbourne, would see the start of a seven-game losing streak which included losses to the defending VFL champions Essendon (31 points), South Melbourne (67 points) and Fitzroy (84 points). The streak of losses would be broken on the 10 August with a three point win over St Kilda at home in Round 13 with Bert Hyde getting three goals for Hawthorn in the victory. They evently finish with the wooden-spoon with a third win in the final match of the season against North Melbourne at home in what was their biggest win of the season (25 points).

=== Results ===
Rd	Date and local time	Opponent	Scores (Hawthorn's scores indicated in bold)			Venue	Record
Rd	Date and local time	Opponent	Home	Away	Result	Venue	Record
1	Saturday, 2 May (2:45 pm)	Richmond	**5.8 (38)**	11.11 (77)	Lost by 39 points	Glenferrie Oval (H)	0–1
2	Saturday, 9 May (2:45 pm)	St Kilda	17.12 (114)	**8.12 (60)**	Lost by 54 points	Junction Oval (A)	0–2
3	Saturday, 16 May (2:45 pm)	Collingwood	**9.11 (65)**	11.16 (82)	Lost by 17 points	Glenferrie Oval (H)	0–3
4	Saturday, 23 May (2:45 pm)	Carlton	10.10 (70)	**6.13 (49)**	Lost by 21 points	Princes Park (A)	0–4
5	Saturday, 30 May (2:45 pm)	Footscray	**10.14 (74)**	8.10 (58)	Won by 16 points	Glenferrie Oval (H)	1–4
6	Saturday, 6 June (2:45 pm)	North Melbourne	8.13 (61)	**8.9 (57)**	Lost by 4 points	Arden Street Oval (A)	1–5
7	Saturday, 13 June (2:45 pm)	Geelong	15.11 (101)	**7.7 (49)**	Lost by 52 points	Corio Oval (A)	1–6
8	Saturday, 20 June (2:45 pm)	Essendon	**9.7 (61)**	10.14 (74)	Lost by 31 points	Glenferrie Oval (H)	1–7
9	Saturday, 27 June (2:45 pm)	South Melbourne	15.14 (104)	**5.7 (37)**	Lost by 67 points	Lake Oval (A)	1–8
10	Saturday, 11 July (2:45 pm)	Fitzroy	19.11 (125)	**5.11 (41)**	Lost by 84 points	Brunswick Street Oval (A)	1–9
11	Saturday, 18 July (2:45 pm)	Melbourne	**6.10 (46)**	14.18 (102)	Lost by 56 points	Glenferrie Oval (H)	1–10
12	Saturday, 1 August (2:45 pm)	Richmond	6.11 (47)	**3.11 (29)**	Lost by 18 points	Punt Road Oval (A)	1–11
13	Saturday, 8 August (2:45 pm)	St Kilda	**8.11 (59)**	8.8 (56)	Won by 3 points	Glenferrie Oval (H)	2–11
14	Saturday, 22 August (2:45 pm)	Collingwood	11.18 (84)	**8.12 (60)**	Lost by 24 points	Victoria Park (A)	2–12
15	Saturday, 29 August (2:45 pm)	Carlton	**7.10 (52)**	11.14 (80)	Lost by 28 points	Glenferrie Oval (H)	2–13
16	Saturday, 5 September (2:45 pm)	Footscray	15.10 (100)	**10.10 (70)**	Lost by 30 points	Western Oval (A)	2–14
17	Saturday, 12 September (2:45 pm)	North Melbourne	**7.13 (55)**	4.6 (30)	Won by 25 points	Glenferrie Oval (H)	3–14

=== Ladder ===
**(P)**	Premiers
	Qualified for finals

#	Team	P	W	L	D	PF	PA	%	Pts
1	Geelong **(P)**	17	15	2	0	1564	1024	152.7	60
2	Essendon	17	13	4	0	1271	1065	119.3	52
3	Melbourne	17	12	4	1	1273	919	138.5	50
4	Collingwood	17	12	5	0	1377	1083	127.1	48
5	Fitzroy	17	12	5	0	1292	1028	125.7	48
6	St Kilda	17	8	9	0	1116	1120	99.6	32
7	Richmond	17	6	10	1	981	1131	86.7	26
8	South Melbourne	17	6	11	0	1089	1271	85.7	24
9	Carlton	17	5	12	0	1066	1349	79.0	20
10	North Melbourne	17	5	12	0	1030	1370	75.2	20
11	Footscray	17	4	13	0	1132	1368	82.7	16
12	Hawthorn	17	3	14	0	902	1365	66.1	12

Rules for classification: 1. premiership points; 2. percentage; 3. points for
Average score: 69.1
Source: AFL Tables
