= 1932 Hawthorn Football Club season =

8th season in the Victorian Football League

Hawthorn Football Club
1932 season
- President: Dr. Jacob Jona
- Coach: Jim Jackson
- Captain: Bert Mills
- Home ground: Glenferrie Oval
- VFL Season: 3–15 (12th)
- Finals Series: Did not qualify
- Best and Fairest: Stan Spinks
- Leading goalkicker: Jack Ryan (37)
- Highest home attendance: 14,500 (Round 1 vs. Collingwood)
- Lowest home attendance: 5,500 (Round 9 vs. Geelong)
- Average home attendance: 8,833

The 1932 season was the Hawthorn Football Club's 8th season in the Victorian Football League and the 31st overall.

== Fixture ==
=== Premiership Season ===
Rd	Date and local time	Opponent	Scores (Hawthorn's scores indicated in bold)			Venue	Attendance	Record
Rd	Date and local time	Opponent	Home	Away	Result	Venue	Attendance	Record
1	Saturday, 30 April (2:45 pm)	Collingwood	**7.9 (51)**	11.10 (76)	Lost by 25 points	Glenferrie Oval (H)	14,500	0–1
2	Saturday, 7 May (2:45 pm)	St Kilda	16.19 (115)	**11.16 (82)**	Lost by 33 points	Junction Oval (A)	13,000	0–2
3	Saturday, 14 May (2:45 pm)	Melbourne	**8.11 (59)**	6.14 (50)	Won by 9 points	Glenferrie Oval (H)	8,000	1–2
4	Saturday, 21 May (2:45 pm)	Carlton	16.16 (112)	**7.7 (49)**	Lost by 63 points	Princes Park (A)	16,000	1–3
5	Saturday, 28 May (2:45 pm)	Richmond	13.18 (96)	**6.9 (45)**	Lost by 51 points	Punt Road Oval (A)	10,000	1–4
6	Saturday, 4 June (2:45 pm)	South Melbourne	**11.14 (80)**	16.13 (109)	Lost by 29 points	Glenferrie Oval (H)	12,000	1–5
7	Saturday, 18 June (2:45 pm)	Essendon	**7.9 (51)**	8.17 (65)	Lost by 14 points	Glenferrie Oval (H)	7,000	1–6
8	Saturday, 25 June (2:45 pm)	Fitzroy	13.15 (93)	**9.9 (63)**	Lost by 30 points	Brunswick Street Oval (A)	7,500	1–7
9	Saturday, 2 July (2:45 pm)	Geelong	**7.12 (54)**	14.11 (95)	Lost by 41 points	Glenferrie Oval (H)	5,500	1–8
10	Saturday, 9 July (2:45 pm)	North Melbourne	14.22 (106)	**8.11 (59)**	Lost by 47 points	Arden Street Oval (A)	6,000	1–9
11	Saturday, 16 July (2:45 pm)	Footscray	**9.9 (63)**	6.6 (42)	Won by 21 points	Glenferrie Oval (H)	7,500	2–9
12	Saturday, 23 July (2:45 pm)	Collingwood	14.10 (94)	**10.10 (70)**	Lost by 24 points	Victoria Park (A)	9,000	2–10
13	Saturday, 30 July (2:45 pm)	St Kilda	**8.13 (61)**	7.8 (50)	Won by 11 points	Glenferrie Oval (H)	6,000	3–10
14	Saturday, 6 August (2:45 pm)	Melbourne	12.4 (76)	**10.12 (72)**	Lost by 4 points	Melbourne Cricket Ground (A)	6,486	3–11
15	Saturday, 13 August (2:45 pm)	Carlton	**8.14 (62)**	12.12 (84)	Lost by 22 points	Glenferrie Oval (H)	9,000	3–12
16	Saturday, 20 August (2:45 pm)	Richmond	**6.9 (45)**	16.16 (112)	Lost by 67 points	Glenferrie Oval (H)	10,000	3–13
17	Saturday, 27 August (2:45 pm)	South Melbourne	24.13 (157)	**4.10 (34)**	Lost by 123 points	Lake Oval (A)	10,000	3–14
18	Saturday, 3 September (2:45 pm)	Essendon	11.15 (81)	**4.10 (34)**	Lost by 47 points	Windy Hill (A)	7,000	3–15

== Ladder ==
(P)	Premiers
	Qualified for finals

#	Team	P	W	L	D	PF	PA	%	Pts
1	Carlton	18	15	3	0	1803	1308	137.8	60
2	Richmond (P)	18	14	3	1	1526	1096	139.2	58
3	Collingwood	18	14	4	0	1644	1473	111.6	56
4	South Melbourne	18	13	5	0	1531	1297	118.0	52
5	Geelong	18	11	6	1	1825	1306	139.7	46
6	Essendon	18	10	8	0	1488	1444	103.0	40
7	Footscray	18	9	9	0	1229	1188	103.5	36
8	North Melbourne	18	8	10	0	1535	1581	97.1	32
9	Melbourne	18	4	14	0	1281	1675	76.5	16
10	Fitzroy	18	3	15	0	1361	1786	76.2	12
11	St Kilda	18	3	15	0	1263	1753	72.0	12
12	Hawthorn	18	3	15	0	1034	1613	64.1	12

Rules for classification: 1. premiership points; 2. percentage; 3. points for
Average score: 81.1
Source: AFL Tables
