= 1929 Hawthorn Football Club season =

5th season in the Victorian Football League

Hawthorn Football Club
1929 season
- President: J.W. Kennon
- Coach: Albert Chadwick
- Captain: Albert Chadwick
- Home ground: Glenferrie Oval
- VFL Season: 4–13 (10th)
- Finals Series: Did not qualify
- Best and Fairest: Ern Utting
- Leading goalkicker: Bert Hyde (47)
- Highest home attendance: 12,500 (Round 16 vs. Richmond)
- Lowest home attendance: 4,000 (Round 17 vs. Footscray)
- Average home attendance: 9,611

The 1929 season was the Hawthorn Football Club's 5th season in the Victorian Football League and 28th overall.

== Fixture ==
=== Premiership Season ===
Rd	Date and local time	Opponent	Scores (Hawthorn's scores indicated in bold)			Venue	Attendance	Record
Rd	Date and local time	Opponent	Home	Away	Result	Venue	Attendance	Record
1	Saturday, 27 April (2:45 pm)	St Kilda	12.10 (82)	**8.10 (58)**	Lost by 24 points	Junction Oval (A)	13,000	0–1
2	Saturday, 4 May (2:45 )	Collingwood	**11.7 (73)**	18.18 (126)	Lost by 53 points	Glenferrie Oval (H)	12,000	0–2
3	Saturday, 11 May (2:45 pm)	Carlton	13.28 (106)	**9.14 (68)**	Lost by 38 points	Princes Park (A)	17,000	0–3
4	Saturday, 18 May (2:45 pm)	Essendon	**10.10 (70)**	10.15 (75)	Lost by 5 points	Glenferrie Oval (H)	12,000	0–4
5	Saturday, 25 May (2:45 pm)	Richmond	16.22 (118)	**12.5 (77)**	Lost by 41 points	Punt Road Oval (A)	14,000	0–5
6	Monday, 3 June (2:45 pm)	Footscray	16.24 (120)	**7.15 (57)**	Lost by 63 points	Western Oval (A)	14,000	0–6
7	Saturday, 15 June (2:45 pm)	South Melbourne	**15.8 (98)**	11.13 (79)	Won by 19 points	Glenferrie Oval (H)	10,000	1–6
8	Saturday, 22 June (2:45 pm)	Geelong	8.8 (56)	**2.13 (25)**	Lost by 31 points	Corio Oval (A)	4,000	1–7
9	Saturday, 29 June (2:45 pm)	Fitzroy	**13.15 (93)**	8.10 (58)	Won by 35 points	Glenferrie Oval (H)	10,000	2–7
10	Saturday, 6 July (2:45 pm)	North Melbourne	8.6 (54)	**8.18 (66)**	Won by 12 points	Arden Street Oval (A)	4,500	3–7
11	Saturday, 13 July (2:45 pm)	Melbourne	**5.13 (43)**	7.11 (53)	Lost by 10 points	Glenferrie Oval (H)	8,000	3–8
12	Saturday, 20 July (2:45 pm)	St Kilda	**7.9 (51)**	15.12 (102)	Lost by 51 points	Glenferrie Oval (H)	12,000	3–9
13	Saturday, 27 July (2:45 pm)	Collingwood	22.10 (142)	**7.14 (56)**	Lost by 86 points	Victoria Park (A)	7,000	3–10
14	Saturday, 3 August (2:45 pm)	Carlton	**5.7 (37)**	7.8 (50)	Lost by 13 points	Glenferrie Oval (H)	6,000	3–11
15	Saturday, 10 August (2:45 pm)	Essendon	15.10 (100)	**13.14 (92)**	Lost by 8 points	Windy Hill (A)	11,000	3–12
16	Saturday, 17 August (2:45 pm)	Richmond	**8.10 (58)**	11.14 (80)	Lost by 22 points	Glenferrie Oval (H)	12,500	3–13
17	Saturday, 24 August (2:45 pm)	Footscray	**10.17 (77)**	5.3 (33)	Won by 44 points	Glenferrie Oval (H)	4,000	4–13
18	Saturday, 31 August (2:45 pm)	South Melbourne	13.10 (88)	**11.5 (71)**	Lost by 17 points	Lake Oval (A)	8,000	4–14

== Ladder ==
(P)	Premiers
	Qualified for finals

#	Team	P	W	L	D	PF	PA	%	Pts
1	Collingwood (P)	18	18	0	0	1918	1117	171.7	72
2	Carlton	18	15	3	0	1589	1161	136.9	60
3	Richmond	18	12	5	1	1703	1399	121.7	50
4	St Kilda	18	12	6	0	1493	1146	130.3	48
5	Melbourne	18	11	6	1	1228	1164	105.5	46
6	Essendon	18	9	8	1	1349	1405	96.0	38
7	Geelong	18	8	10	0	1175	1082	108.6	32
8	South Melbourne	18	7	11	0	1338	1578	84.8	28
9	Footscray	18	6	11	1	1268	1464	86.6	26
10	Hawthorn	18	4	14	0	1170	1522	76.9	16
11	Fitzroy	18	3	15	0	1340	1827	73.3	12
12	North Melbourne	18	1	17	0	1070	1776	60.2	4

Rules for classification: 1. premiership points; 2. percentage; 3. points for
Average score: 77.0
Source: AFL Tables
