= 1930 Hawthorn Football Club season =

6th season in the Victorian Football League

Hawthorn Football Club
1930 season
- President: J.W. Kennon
- Coach: John Harris
- Captain: John Harris
- Home ground: Glenferrie Oval
- VFL Season: 6–12 (10th)
- Finals Series: Did not quality
- Best and Fairest: Jack Sharpley
- Leading goalkicker: Bert Hyde (52)
- Highest home attendance: 28,000 (Round 3 vs. Carlton)
- Lowest home attendance: 5,000 (Round 18 vs. Melbourne)
- Average home attendance: 12,222

The 1930 season was the Hawthorn Football Club's 6th season in the Victorian Football League and 29th overall.

== Fixture ==
=== Premiership Season ===
Rd	Date and local time	Opponent	Scores (Hawthorn's scores indicated in bold)			Venue	Attendance	Record
Rd	Date and local time	Opponent	Home	Away	Result	Venue	Attendance	Record
1	Saturday, 3 May (2:45 pm)	St Kilda	**16.7 (103)**	14.8 (92)	Won by 11 points	Glenferrie Oval (H)	18,000	1–0
2	Saturday, 10 May (2:45 pm)	Collingwood	11.12 (78)	**10.10 (70)**	Lost by 8 points	Victoria Park (A)	19,000	1–1
3	Saturday, 17 May (2:45 pm)	Carlton	**10.12 (72)**	13.9 (87)	Lost by 15 points	Glenferrie Oval (H)	28,000	1–2
4	Saturday, 24 May (2:45 pm)	Essendon	14.12 (96)	**8.13 (61)**	Lost by 35 points	Windy Hill (A)	15,000	1–3
5	Saturday, 31 May (2:45 pm)	Richmond	**8.11 (59)**	11.11 (77)	Lost by 18 points	Glenferrie Oval (H)	18,000	1–4
6	Saturday, 7 June (2:45 pm)	Footscray	8.9 (57)	**8.8 (56)**	Lost by 1 point	Western Oval (A)	9,000	1–5
7	Saturday, 14 June (2:45 pm)	South Melbourne	17.11 (113)	**9.10 (64)**	Lost by 49 points	Lake Oval (A)	11,000	1–6
8	Saturday, 21 June (2:45 pm)	Geelong	**9.18 (72)**	6.11 (47)	Won by 25 points	Glenferrie Oval (H)	8,000	2–6
9	Saturday, 28 June (2:45 pm)	Fitzroy	18.11 (119)	**13.17 (95)**	Lost by 24 points	Brunswick Street Oval (A)	11,000	2–7
10	Saturday, 5 July (2:45 pm)	North Melbourne	**11.15 (81)**	11.11 (77)	Won by 4 points	Glenferrie Oval (H)	7,000	3–7
11	Saturday, 12 July (2:45 pm)	Melbourne	12.10 (82)	**6.5 (41)**	Lost by 41 points	Melbourne Cricket Ground (A)	8,723	3–8
12	Saturday, 19 July (2:45 pm)	Richmond	15.19 (109)	**7.7 (49)**	Lost by 60 points	Punt Road Oval (A)	10,000	3–9
13	Saturday, 26 July (2:45 pm)	Footscray	**11.10 (76)**	11.7 (73)	Won by 3 points	Glenferrie Oval (H)	9,000	4–9
14	Saturday, 16 August (2:45 pm)	South Melbourne	**11.7 (73)**	14.10 (94)	Lost by 21 points	Glenferrie Oval (H)	10,000	4–10
15	Saturday, 23 August (2:45 pm)	Geelong	18.17 (125)	**6.7 (43)**	Lost by 82 points	Corio Oval (A)	9,000	4–11
16	Saturday, 30 August (2:45 pm)	Fitzroy	**3.16 (34)**	15.14 (104)	Lost by 70 points	Glenferrie Oval (H)	7,000	4–12
17	Saturday, 6 September (2:45 pm)	North Melbourne	7.9 (51)	**9.12 (66)**	Won by 15 points	Arden Street Oval (A)	4,000	5–12
18	Saturday, 13 September (2:45 pm)	Melbourne	**12.18 (90)**	10.17 (77)	Won by 13 points	Glenferrie Oval (H)	5,000	6–12

== Ladder ==
(P)	Premiers
	Qualified for finals

#	Team	P	W	L	D	PF	PA	%	Pts
1	Collingwood (P)	18	15	3	0	1931	1338	144.3	60
2	Carlton	18	15	3	0	1747	1234	141.6	60
3	Richmond	18	11	7	0	1450	1163	124.7	44
4	Geelong	18	11	7	0	1495	1259	118.7	44
5	Melbourne	18	11	7	0	1509	1441	104.7	44
6	Essendon	18	10	8	0	1495	1417	105.5	40
7	South Melbourne	18	9	9	0	1553	1553	100.0	36
8	St Kilda	18	8	10	0	1454	1435	101.3	32
9	Fitzroy	18	7	11	0	1411	1581	89.2	28
10	Hawthorn	18	6	12	0	1205	1558	77.3	24
11	Footscray	18	4	14	0	1164	1535	75.8	16
12	North Melbourne	18	1	17	0	969	1869	51.8	4

Rules for classification: 1. premiership points; 2. percentage; 3. points for
Average score: 80.5
Source: AFL Tables
