= 1959 Hawthorn Football Club season =

35th season in the Victorian Football League

Hawthorn Football Club
1959 season
- President: Dr. A.S. Ferguson
- Coach: Jack Hale
- Captain: John Kennedy Sr.
- Home ground: Glenferrie Oval
- Night series: Runner-up
- VFL season: 9–9 (7th)
- Finals series: Did not qualify
- Best and fairest: Allan Woodley
- Leading goalkicker: Garry Young (35)
- Highest home attendance: 28,000 (Round 6 vs. Carlton)
- Lowest home attendance: 10,000 (Round 14 vs. Footscray)
- Average home attendance: 16,833

The 1959 season was the Hawthorn Football Club's 35th season in the Victorian Football League and 58th overall.

== Fixture ==
=== Night Series ===
Rd	Date and local time	Opponent	Scores (Hawthorn's scores indicated in bold)			Venue	Attendance
Rd	Date and local time	Opponent	Home	Away	Result	Venue	Attendance
1	Monday, 7 September	St Kilda	**11.17 (83)**	4.7 (31)	Won by 52 points	Lake Oval	12,400
Semi-final	Thursday, 17 September	South Melbourne	**13.14 (92)**	13.10 (88)	Won by 4 points	Lake Oval	16,100
Final	Monday, 28 September	Fitzroy	10.10 (70)	**4.16 (40)**	Lost by 30 points	Lake Oval	9,200

=== Premiership Season ===
Rd	Date and local time	Opponent	Scores (Hawthorn's scores indicated in bold)			Venue	Attendance	Record
Rd	Date and local time	Opponent	Home	Away	Result	Venue	Attendance	Record
1	Saturday, 18 April (2:30 pm)	Fitzroy	19.17 (131)	**17.18 (120)**	Lost by 11 points	Brunswick Street Oval (A)	20,000	0–1
2	Saturday, 2 May (2:30 pm)	Geelong	**18.15 (123)**	12.12 (84)	Won by 39 points	Glenferrie Oval (H)	14,000	1–1
3	Saturday, 9 May (2:30 pm)	Footscray	8.10 (58)	**15.12 (102)**	Won by 44 points	Western Oval (A)	17,417	2–1
4	Saturday, 16 May (2:30 pm)	South Melbourne	**19.14 (128)**	13.19 (87)	Won by 31 points	Glenferrie Oval (H)	25,000	3–1
5	Saturday, 23 May (2:30 pm)	St Kilda	10.21 (81)	**11.11 (77)**	Lost by 4 points	Junction Oval (A)	21,500	3–2
6	Saturday, 30 May (2:30 pm)	Carlton	**11.9 (75)**	12.11 (83)	Lost by 8 points	Glenferrie Oval (H)	28,000	3–3
7	Saturday, 6 June (2:20 pm)	Richmond	**14.9 (93)**	8.15 (63)	Won by 30 points	Glenferrie Oval (H)	14,500	4–3
8	Saturday, 13 June (2:20 pm)	North Melbourne	12.12 (84)	**8.6 (54)**	Lost by 30 points	Arden Street Oval (A)	12,500	4–4
9	Saturday, 27 June (2:20 pm)	Melbourne	**6.16 (52)**	11.11 (77)	Lost by 25 points	Glenferrie Oval (H)	17,000	4–5
10	Saturday, 4 July (2:20 pm)	Essendon	**14.13 (97)**	12.20 (92)	Won by 5 points	Glenferrie Oval (H)	15,500	5–5
11	Saturday, 11 July (2:20 pm)	Collingwood	10.15 (75)	**10.14 (74)**	Lost by 1 point	Victoria Park (A)	24,502	5–6
12	Saturday, 18 July (2:20 pm)	Fitzroy	**8.13 (61)**	8.19 (67)	Lost by 6 points	Glenferrie Oval (H)	15,500	5–7
13	Saturday, 25 July (2:20 pm)	Geelong	14.16 (100)	**13.13 (91)**	Lost by 9 points	Kardinia Park (A)	10,072	5–8
14	Saturday, 1 August (2:20 pm)	Footscray	**14.15 (99)**	7.10 (52)	Won by 47 points	Glenferrie Oval (H)	10,000	6–8
15	Saturday, 8 August (2:20 pm)	South Melbourne	8.14 (62)	**10.3 (63)**	Won by 1 point	Lake Oval (A)	13,000	7–8
16	Saturday, 15 August (2:20 pm)	St Kilda	**10.11 (71)**	5.5 (35)	Won by 36 points	Glenferrie Oval (H)	12,000	8–8
17	Saturday, 22 August (2:20 pm)	Carlton	13.20 (98)	**14.12 (96)**	Lost by 2 points	Princes Park (A)	18,720	8–9
18	Saturday, 29 August (2:20 pm)	Richmond	10.13 (73)	**17.14 (116)**	Won by 43 points	Punt Road Oval (A)	12,000	9–9

== Ladder ==
(P)	Premiers
	Qualified for finals

#	Team	P	W	L	D	PF	PA	%	Pts
1	Melbourne (P)	18	13	4	1	1731	1213	142.7	54
2	Carlton	18	13	5	0	1534	1404	109.3	52
3	Collingwood	18	12	6	0	1477	1215	121.6	48
4	Essendon	18	11	7	0	1598	1422	112.4	44
5	Fitzroy	18	10	7	1	1533	1351	113.5	42
6	North Melbourne	18	10	8	0	1331	1490	89.3	40
7	Hawthorn	18	9	9	0	1592	1412	112.7	36
8	St Kilda	18	9	9	0	1428	1515	94.3	36
9	South Melbourne	18	8	10	0	1515	1465	103.4	32
10	Geelong	18	5	13	0	1320	1681	78.5	20
11	Richmond	18	4	14	0	1309	1771	73.9	16
12	Footscray	18	3	15	0	1178	1607	73.3	12

Rules for classification: 1. premiership points; 2. percentage; 3. points for
Average score: 81.2
Source: AFL Tables
