= 1957 Hawthorn Football Club season =

33rd season in the Victorian Football League

Hawthorn Football Club
1957 season
- President: Dr. A.S. Ferguson
- Coach: Jack Hale; John Kennedy Sr. (round 11)
- Captain: John Kennedy Sr.
- Home ground: Glenferrie Oval
- Night series: 1st round
- VFL season: 11–7 (3rd)
- Finals series: Preliminary final (lost to Melbourne 76–144)
- Best and fairest: Alf Hughes
- Leading goalkicker: Terry Ingersoll (33)
- Highest home attendance: 69,455 (Semi-final vs. Carlton)
- Lowest home attendance: 12,000 (Round 14 vs. North Melbourne
- Average home attendance: 27,046

The 1957 season was the Hawthorn Football Club's 33rd season in the Victorian Football League and 56th overall. This was the first time since 1923 Hawthorn qualified for finals, and the first time since joining the VFL in 1925.

== Fixture ==
=== Night Series ===
Due to the popularity of the night series cup every team competed in the 1957 night series.

Rd	Date and local time	Opponent	Scores (Hawthorn's scores indicated in bold)			Venue	Attendance
Rd	Date and local time	Opponent	Home	Away	Result	Venue	Attendance
1	Thursday, 12 September	Footscray	11.10 (76)	**7.15 (57)**	Lost by 19 points	Lake Oval	14,000

=== Premiership Season ===
Rd	Date and local time	Opponent	Scores (Hawthorn's scores indicated in bold)			Venue	Attendance	Record
Rd	Date and local time	Opponent	Home	Away	Result	Venue	Attendance	Record
1	Saturday, 20 April (2:15 pm)	Carlton	10.6 (66)	**15.12 (102)**	Won by 36 points	Princes Park Football Ground (A)	24,321	1–0
2	Saturday, 27 April (2:15 pm)	Richmond	**9.22 (76)**	8.9 (57)	Won by 19 points	Glenferrie Oval (H)	21,000	2–0
3	Saturday, 4 May (2:15 pm)	North Melbourne	13.9 (87)	**11.12 (78)**	Lost by 9 points	Arden Street Oval (A)	11,000	2–1
4	Saturday, 11 May (2:15 pm)	Melbourne	**6.15 (51)**	4.9 (33)	Won by 18 points	Glenferrie Oval (H)	20,000	3–1
5	Saturday, 18 May (2:15 pm)	Geelong	9.10 (64)	**3.19 (37)**	Lost by 27 points	Kardinia Park (A)	18,000	3–2
6	Saturday, 25 May (2:15 pm)	Essendon	9.12 (66)	**11.8 (74)**	Won by 8 points	Windy Hill (A)	22,000	4–2
7	Saturday, 1 June (2:15 pm)	Footscray	**11.11 (77)**	7.8 (50)	Won by 27 points	Glenferrie Oval (H)	26,000	5–2
8	Saturday, 8 June (2:15 pm)	South Melbourne	9.14 (68)	**13.11 (89)**	Won by 21 points	Lake Oval (A)	18,200	6–2
9	Monday, 17 June (2:15 pm)	Fitzroy	**15.14 (104)**	7.14 (56)	Won by 48 points	Glenferrie Oval (H)	25,500	7–2
10	Saturday, 22 June (2:15 pm)	St Kilda	10.15 (75)	**8.11 (59)**	Lost by 16 points	Junction Oval (A)	21,000	7–3
11	Saturday, 29 June (2:15 pm)	Collingwood	**10.14 (74)**	13.15 (93)	Lost by 19 points	Glenferrie Oval (H)	27,000	7–4
12	Saturday, 6 July (2:15 pm)	Carlton	**7.10 (52)**	8.13 (61)	Lost by 9 points	Glenferrie Oval (H)	26,000	7–5
13	Saturday, 13 July (2:15 pm)	Richmond	11.12 (78)	**10.15 (75)**	Lost by 3 points	Punt Road Oval (A)	22,000	7–6
14	Saturday, 27 July (2:15 pm)	North Melbourne	**7.13 (55)**	5.4 (34)	Won by 21 points	Glenferrie Oval (H)	12,000	8–6
15	Saturday, 3 August (2:15 pm)	Melbourne	8.18 (66)	**10.13 (73)**	Won by 7 points	Melbourne Cricket Ground (A)	32,163	9–6
16	Saturday, 10 August (2:15 pm)	Geelong	**14.19 (103)**	8.7 (55)	Won by 48 points	Glenferrie Oval (H)	12,500	10–6
17	Saturday, 17 August (2:15 pm)	Essendon	**13.7 (85)**	9.10 (64)	Won by 21 points	Glenferrie Oval (H)	31,000	11–6
18	Saturday, 24 August (2:15 pm)	Footscray	8.11 (59)	**7.15 (57)**	Lost by 2 points	Western Oval (A)	25,436	11–7

=== Finals Series ===
Rd	Date and local time	Opponent	Scores (Hawthorn's scores indicated in bold)			Venue	Attendance
Rd	Date and local time	Opponent	Home	Away	Result	Venue	Attendance
First Semi-final	Saturday, 31 August (2:30 pm)	Carlton	**10.11 (71)**	6.12 (48)	Won by 23 points	Melbourne Cricket Ground (H)	69,455
Preliminary final	Saturday, 14 September (2:30 pm)	Melbourne	22.12 (144)	**11.10 (76)**	Lost by 68 points	Melbourne Cricket Ground (A)	74,090

== Ladder ==
(P)	Premiers
	Qualified for finals

#	Team	P	W	L	D	PF	PA	%	Pts
1	Melbourne (P)	18	12	5	1	1567	1129	138.8	50
2	Essendon	18	11	7	0	1447	1223	118.3	44
3	Hawthorn	18	11	7	0	1321	1132	116.7	44
4	Carlton	18	11	7	0	1341	1348	99.5	44
5	Collingwood	18	9	8	1	1390	1366	101.8	38
6	Footscray	18	9	8	1	1263	1275	99.1	38
7	Richmond	18	9	9	0	1506	1604	93.9	36
8	North Melbourne	18	8	10	0	1404	1477	95.1	32
9	St Kilda	18	8	10	0	1318	1394	94.5	32
10	South Melbourne	18	7	11	0	1349	1519	88.8	28
11	Fitzroy	18	6	12	0	1355	1611	84.1	24
12	Geelong	18	5	12	1	1368	1551	88.2	22

Rules for classification: 1. premiership points; 2. percentage; 3. points for
Average score: 77.0
Source: AFL Tables
