= 1942 Hawthorn Football Club season =

18th season in the Victorian Football League

Hawthorn Football Club
1942 season
- President: Dr. Jacob Jona
- Coach: Roy Cazaly
- Captain: Jack Carmody
- Home ground: Glenferrie Oval
- VFL Season: 1–14 (11th)
- Finals Series: Did not qualify
- Best and Fairest: Jack Barker
- Leading goalkicker: Alec Albiston (32)
- Highest home attendance: 6,000 (Round 11 vs. Richmond
- Lowest home attendance: 2,500 (Round 15 vs. Melbourne
- Average home attendance: 4,143

The 1942 season was the Hawthorn Football Club's 18th season in the Victorian Football League and 41st overall.

== Fixture ==
=== Premiership Season ===
With World War II happening at the time, Geelong weren't able to compete in the 1942 season due to wartime travel restrictions, whilst Melbourne and Collingwood struggled to field a team. Hawthorn and Collingwood also withdrew their teams from the reserves competition.

Rd	Date and local time	Opponent	Scores (Hawthorn's scores indicated in bold)			Venue	Attendance	Record
Rd	Date and local time	Opponent	Home	Away	Result	Venue	Attendance	Record
1	Saturday, 9 May (2:45 pm)	North Melbourne	**13.15 (93)**	18.19 (117)	Lost by 34 points	Glenferrie Oval (H)	5,000	0–1
2	Saturday, 16 May (2:45 pm)	St Kilda	16.13 (109)	**9.17 (71)**	Lost by 38 points	Toorak Park (A)	5,500	0–2
3	Saturday, 23 May (2:45 pm)	Footscray	**5.11 (41)**	17.15 (117)	Lost by 76 points	Glenferrie Oval (H)	5,000	0–3
4	Saturday, 30 May (2:45 pm)	Melbourne	16.15 (111)	**8.17 (65)**	Lost by 46 points	Punt Road Oval (A)	3,500	0–4
5	Saturday, 6 June (2:45 pm)	Collingwood	**13.10 (88)**	10.20 (80)	Won by 8 points	Glenferrie Oval (H)	4,000	1–4
6	Bye							
7	Saturday, 20 June (2:45 pm)	Fitzroy	16.14 (110)	**14.10 (94)**	Lost by 16 points	Brunswick Street Oval (A)	5,000	1–5
8	Saturday, 27 June (2:45 pm)	Essendon	22.12 (144)	**5.8 (38)**	Lost by 106 points	Windy Hill (A)	6,000	1–6
9	Saturday, 4 July (2:45 pm)	Carlton	**8.10 (58)**	12.14 (86)	Lost by 28 points	Glenferrie Oval (H)	3,000	1–7
10	Saturday, 11 July (2:30 pm)	South Melbourne	12.19 (91)	**13.10 (88)**	Lost by 3 points	Punt Road Oval (A)	6,000	1–8
11	Saturday, 18 July (2:45 pm)	Richmond	**13.17 (95)**	19.13 (127)	Lost by 32 points	Glenferrie Oval (H)	6,000	1–9
12	Saturday, 25 July (2:30 pm)	North Melbourne	9.10 (64)	**6.16 (52)**	Lost by 12 points	Arden Street Oval (A)	3,000	1–10
13	Saturday, 1 August (2:45 pm)	St Kilda	**8.9 (57)**	10.15 (75)	Lost by 18 points	Glenferrie Oval (H)	3,500	1–11
14	Saturday, 8 August (2:45 pm)	Footscray	20.17 (137)	**9.4 (58)**	Lost by 79 points	Yarraville Oval (A)	2,500	1–12
15	Saturday, 15 August (2:45 pm)	Melbourne	**7.15 (57)**	16.22 (118)	Lost by 61 points	Glenferrie Oval (H)	2,500	1–13
16	Saturday, 22 August (2:45 pm)	Collingwood	16.21 (117)	**15.13 (103)**	Lost by 14 points	Victoria Park (A)	2,000	1–14

== Ladder ==
Teams were awarded four premiership points for each bye, with five teams receiving two byes as the result of an uneven fixture.

(P)	Premiers
	Qualified for finals

#	Team	P	W	L	D	B	PF	PA	%	Pts
1	Essendon (P)	15	12	3	0	1	1426	1122	127.1	52
2	Richmond	15	11	4	0	1	1778	1322	134.5	48
3	South Melbourne	15	11	4	0	1	1513	1173	129.0	48
4	Footscray	14	10	4	0	2	1460	1159	126.0	48
5	Carlton	14	10	4	0	2	1361	1132	120.2	48
6	Fitzroy	15	8	7	0	1	1405	1340	104.9	36
7	St Kilda	14	6	8	0	2	1076	1314	81.9	32
8	Melbourne	15	5	10	0	1	1384	1624	85.2	24
9	North Melbourne	14	4	10	0	2	1105	1413	78.2	24
10	Collingwood	14	2	12	0	2	1120	1474	76.0	16
11	Hawthorn	15	1	14	0	1	1058	1613	65.6	8

Rules for classification: 1. premiership points; 2. percentage; 3. points for
Average score: 91.8
Source: AFL Tables
