= 1955 Hawthorn Football Club season =

31st season in the Victorian Football League

Hawthorn Football Club
1955 season
- President: Dr. A.S. Ferguson
- Coach: Jack Hale
- Captain: John Kennedy Sr.
- Home ground: Glenferrie Oval
- VFL season: 8–10 (8th)
- Finals series: Did not qualify
- Best and fairest: Graham Arthur
- Leading goalkicker: Kevin Coghlan (28)
- Highest home attendance: 26,000 (Round 4 vs. Collingwood)
- Lowest home attendance: 10,500 (Round 10 vs. St Kilda, Round 12 vs. Fitzroy)
- Average home attendance: 17,022

The 1955 season was the Hawthorn Football Club's 31st season in the Victorian Football League and 54th overall.

== Fixture ==
=== Premiership Season ===
Rd	Date and local time	Opponent	Scores (Hawthorn's scores indicated in bold)			Venue	Attendance	Record
Rd	Date and local time	Opponent	Home	Away	Result	Venue	Attendance	Record
1	Saturday, 16 April (2:15 pm)	Fitzroy	13.15 (93)	**7.16 (58)**	Lost by 35 points	Brunswick Street Oval (A)	16,000	0–1
2	Saturday, 23 April (2:15 pm)	Carlton	**12.15 (87)**	9.6 (60)	Won by 27 points	Glenferrie Oval (H)	19,000	1–1
3	Saturday, 30 April (2:15 pm)	South Melbourne	7.14 (56)	**15.8 (98)**	Won by 42 points	Lake Oval (A)	18,000	2–1
4	Saturday, 7 May (2:15 pm)	Collingwood	**12.12 (84)**	12.3 (75)	Won by 9 points	Glenferrie Oval (H)	26,000	3–1
5	Saturday, 14 May (2:15 pm)	North Melbourne	**14.7 (91)**	13.15 (93)	Lost by 2 points	Glenferrie Oval (H)	15,000	3–2
6	Saturday, 21 May (2:15 pm)	Melbourne	11.5 (71)	**6.8 (44)**	Lost by 27 points	Melbourne Cricket Ground (A)	28,333	3–3
7	Saturday, 28 May (2:15 pm)	Essendon	9.11 (65)	**10.10 (70)**	Won by 5 points	Windy Hill (A)	20,000	4–3
8	Saturday, 4 June (2:15 pm)	Richmond	**9.8 (62)**	8.12 (60)	Won by 2 points	Glenferrie Oval (H)	19,600	5–3
9	Saturday, 11 June (2:15 pm)	Footscray	17.12 (114)	**8.11 (59)**	Lost by 55 points	Western Oval (A)	28,807	5–4
10	Saturday, 25 June (2:15 pm)	St Kilda	**12.9 (81)**	6.7 (43)	Won by 38 points	Glenferrie Oval (H)	10,500	6–4
11	Saturday, 2 July (2:15 pm)	Geelong	16.13 (109)	**7.8 (50)**	Lost by 59 points	Kardinia Park (A)	17,238	6–5
12	Saturday, 9 July (2:15 pm)	Fitzroy	**18.12 (120)**	9.5 (59)	Won by 61 points	Glenferrie Oval (H)	10,500	7–5
13	Saturday, 16 July (2:15 pm)	Carlton	10.19 (79)	**9.9 (63)**	Lost by 16 points	Princes Park (A)	15,763	7–6
14	Saturday, 23 July (2:15 pm)	South Melbourne	**10.11 (71)**	6.15 (51)	Won by 20 points	Glenferrie Oval (H)	12,100	8–6
15	Saturday, 30 July (2:15 pm)	Collingwood	10.11 (71)	**5.6 (36)**	Lost by 35 points	Victoria Park (A)	16,000	8–7
16	Saturday, 6 August (2:15 pm)	North Melbourne	8.12 (60)	**8.5 (53)**	Lost by 7 points	Arden Street Oval (A)	9,000	8–8
17	Saturday, 13 August (2:15 pm)	Melbourne	**12.13 (85)**	13.13 (91)	Lost by 6 points	Glenferrie Oval (H)	16,000	8–9
18	Saturday, 20 August (2:15 pm)	Essendon	**7.8 (50)**	13.14 (92)	Lost by 42 points	Glenferrie Oval (H)	24,500	8–10

== Ladder ==
(P)	Premiers
	Qualified for finals

#	Team	P	W	L	D	PF	PA	%	Pts
1	Melbourne (P)	18	15	3	0	1559	1036	150.5	60
2	Collingwood	18	14	4	0	1526	1197	127.5	56
3	Geelong	18	14	4	0	1524	1241	122.8	56
4	Essendon	18	12	6	0	1435	1099	130.6	48
5	Footscray	18	12	6	0	1323	1018	130.0	48
6	Richmond	18	9	9	0	1471	1387	106.1	36
7	Carlton	18	9	9	0	1384	1403	98.6	36
8	Hawthorn	18	8	10	0	1262	1342	94.0	32
9	Fitzroy	18	6	12	0	1258	1421	88.5	24
10	South Melbourne	18	5	13	0	1276	1454	87.8	20
11	North Melbourne	18	3	15	0	1233	1617	76.3	12
12	St Kilda	18	1	17	0	861	1897	45.4	4

Rules for classification: 1. premiership points; 2. percentage; 3. points for
Average score: 74.6
Source: AFL Tables
