= 1938 Hawthorn Football Club season =

14th season in the Victorian Football League

Hawthorn Football Club
1938 season
- President: Dr. Jacob Jona
- Coach: Ivan McAlpine
- Captain: Bert Mills
- Home ground: Glenferrie Oval
- VFL Season: 4–14 (11th)
- Finals Series: Did not qualify
- Best and Fairest: Stan Spinks
- Leading goalkicker: Alby Naismith (30)
- Highest home attendance: 18,000 (Round 1 vs. Carlton, Round 5 vs. Richmond)
- Lowest home attendance: 7,000 (Round 13 vs. Melbourne, Round 17 vs. South Melbourne)
- Average home attendance: 11,667

The 1938 season was the Hawthorn Football Club's 14th season in the Victorian Football League and 37th overall.

== Fixture ==
=== Premiership Season ===
Rd	Date and local time	Opponent	Scores (Hawthorn's scores indicated in bold)			Venue	Attendance	Record
Rd	Date and local time	Opponent	Home	Away	Result	Venue	Attendance	Record
1	Saturday, 23 April (2:45 pm)	Carlton	**10.10 (76)**	14.8 (92)	Lost by 16 points	Glenferrie Oval (H)	18,000	0–1
2	Saturday, 30 April (2:45 pm)	Melbourne	14.8 (92)	**16.15 (111)**	Won by 19 points	Melbourne Cricket Ground (A)	11,327	1–1
3	Saturday, 7 May (2:45 pm)	Footscray	**8.14 (62)**	9.16 (70)	Lost by 8 points	Glenferrie Oval (H)	14,500	1–2
4	Saturday, 14 May (2:45 pm)	Collingwood	21.15 (141)	**14.16 (100)**	Lost by 41 points	Victoria Park (A)	14,000	1–3
5	Saturday, 21 May (2:45 pm)	Richmond	**13.9 (87)**	12.12 (84)	Won by 3 points	Glenferrie Oval (H)	18,000	2–3
6	Saturday, 28 May (2:45 pm)	South Melbourne	13.16 (94)	**18.12 (120)**	Won by 26 points	Lake Oval (A)	11,000	3–3
7	Saturday, 4 June (2:45 pm)	Essendon	16.20 (116)	**16.7 (103)**	Lost by 13 points	Windy Hill (A)	12,000	3–4
8	Monday, 13 June (2:45 pm)	Fitzroy	**7.11 (53)**	12.22 (94)	Lost by 41 points	Glenferrie Oval (H)	16,000	3–5
9	Saturday, 18 June (2:45 pm)	Geelong	11.23 (89)	**6.13 (49)**	Lost by 40 points	Corio Oval (A)	7,000	3–6
10	Saturday, 25 June (2:45 pm)	St Kilda	**8.12 (60)**	9.10 (64)	Lost by 4 points	Glenferrie Oval (H)	10,000	3–7
11	Saturday, 2 July (2:45 pm)	North Melbourne	13.14 (92)	**12.6 (78)**	Lost by 14 points	Arden Street Oval (A)	4,000	3–8
12	Saturday, 9 July (2:45 pm)	Carlton	12.12 (84)	**8.15 (63)**	Lost by 21 points	Princes Park (A)	14,000	3–9
13	Saturday, 23 July (2:45 pm)	Melbourne	**10.9 (69)**	9.16 (70)	Lost by 1 point	Glenferrie Oval (H)	7,000	3–10
14	Saturday, 30 July (2:45 pm)	Footscray	17.14 (116)	**4.7 (31)**	Lost by 85 points	Western Oval (A)	11,000	3–11
15	Saturday, 6 August (2:45 pm)	Collingwood	**12.11 (83)**	18.15 (123)	Lost by 40 points	Glenferrie Oval (H)	8,000	3–12
16	Saturday, 13 August (2:45 pm)	Richmond	19.18 (132)	**12.11 (83)**	Lost by 49 points	Punt Road Oval (A)	9,000	3–13
17	Saturday, 20 August (2:45 pm)	South Melbourne	**17.15 (117)**	9.20 (74)	Won by 43 points	Glenferrie Oval (H)	7,000	4–13
18	Saturday, 27 August (2:45 pm)	Essendon	**9.15 (69)**	12.18 (90)	Lost by 21 points	Glenferrie Oval (H)	6,500	4–14

== Ladder ==
(P)	Premiers
	Qualified for finals

#	Team	P	W	L	D	PF	PA	%	Pts
1	Carlton (P)	18	14	4	0	1827	1574	116.1	56
2	Geelong	18	13	5	0	1897	1468	129.2	52
3	Footscray	18	13	5	0	1723	1386	124.3	52
4	Collingwood	18	12	6	0	1942	1652	117.6	48
5	Melbourne	18	11	7	0	1776	1676	106.0	44
6	Richmond	18	10	8	0	1747	1563	111.8	40
7	Essendon	18	9	9	0	1801	1760	102.3	36
8	St Kilda	18	9	9	0	1474	1606	91.8	36
9	North Melbourne	18	6	12	0	1384	1852	74.7	24
10	Fitzroy	18	5	13	0	1543	1742	88.6	20
11	Hawthorn	18	4	14	0	1414	1717	82.4	16
12	South Melbourne	18	2	16	0	1353	1885	71.8	8

Rules for classification: 1. premiership points; 2. percentage; 3. points for
Average score: 92.0
Source: AFL Tables
