= List of Hawthorn Football Club leading goalkickers =

The following is a list of Hawthorn Football Club leading goalkickers in each season of the Victorian Football Association and Australian Football League (formerly the Victorian Football League).

== Leading goalkickers by season ==
=== VFA era ===
| Season | Player(s) | Goals |
|---|---|---|
| 1914 | Arthur Fewster | [?] |
| 1915 | Arthur Fewster (2) | [?] |
| 1916 | League in recess | |
| 1917 | League in recess | |
| 1918 | Club in recess | |
| 1919 | Len Gibb | [?] |
| 1920 | Charlie Fehring | [?] |
| 1921 | Cyril Gambetta | [?] |
| 1922 | Arthur Pearson | [?] |
| 1923 | Fred Latham | [?] |
| 1924 | Hec Yeomans | [?] |

=== VFL/AFL era ===
| ^ | Denotes current player |
| + | Player won Coleman Medal/VFL leading goalkicker medal in same season |

| Season | Leading goalkicker | Goals |
|---|---|---|
| 1925 | Les Woodford | 20 |
| 1926 | Bert Hyde | 27 |
| 1927 | Bert Hyde (2) | 41 |
| 1928 | Bert Hyde (3) | 62 |
| 1929 | Bert Hyde (4) | 47 |
| 1930 | Bert Hyde (5) | 52 |
| 1931 | Jack Ryan | 39 |
| 1932 | Jack Ryan (2) | 37 |
| 1933 | Ted Pool | 27 |
| 1934 | Jack Green | 80 |
| 1935 | Jack Green (2) | 63 |
| 1936 | Norm Hillard | 26 |
| 1937 | Norm Hillard (2) | 31 |
| 1938 | Alby Naismith | 30 |
| 1939 | Alec Albiston | 37 |
| 1940 | Alby Naismith (2) | 25 |
| 1941 | Alec Albiston (2) | 57 |
| 1942 | Alec Albiston (3) | 32 |
| 1943 | Wally Culpitt | 43 |
| 1944 | Wally Culpitt (2) | 57 |
| 1945 | Alec Albiston (4) | 66 |
| 1946 | Albert Prior | 52 |
| 1947 | Albert Prior (2) | 67 |
| 1948 | Albert Prior (3) | 47 |
| 1949 | Albert Prior (4) | 48 |
| 1950 | Gordon Anderson | 21 |
| 1951 | Pat Cash | 26 |
| 1952 | Jack MacDonald | 25 |
| 1953 | Kevin Coghlan | 19 |
| 1954 | Kevin Coghlan (2) | 27 |
| 1955 | Kevin Coghlan (3) | 28 |
| 1956 | John Peck | 31 |
| 1957 | Terry Ingersoll | 33 |
| 1958 | John Peck (2) | 27 |
| 1959 | Garry Young | 35 |
| 1960 | Garry Young (2) | 36 |
| 1961 | John Peck (3) | 49 |
| 1962 | John Peck (4) | 38 |
| 1963 | John Peck+ (5) | 75 |
| 1964 | John Peck+ (6) | 68 |
| 1965 | John Peck+ (7) | 56 |
| 1966 | John Peck (8) | 32 |
| 1967 | Peter Hudson | 57 |
| 1968 | Peter Hudson+ (2) | 125 |
| 1969 | Peter Hudson (3) | 120 |
| 1970 | Peter Hudson+ (4) | 146 |
| 1971 | Peter Hudson+ (5) | 150 |
| 1972 | Peter Knights | 46 |
| 1973 | Leigh Matthews | 51 |
| 1974 | Michael Moncrieff | 67 |
| 1975 | Leigh Matthews+ (2) | 68 |
| 1976 | Michael Moncrieff (2) | 97 |
| 1977 | Peter Hudson+ (6) | 110 |
| 1978 | Michael Moncrieff (3) | 90 |
| 1979 | Michael Moncrieff (4) | 45 |
| 1980 | Michael Moncrieff (5) | 86 |
| 1981 | Leigh Matthews (3) | 48 |
| 1982 | Leigh Matthews (4) | 74 |
| 1983 | Leigh Matthews (5) | 79 |
| 1984 | Leigh Matthews (6) | 77 |
| 1985 | Dermott Brereton | 58 |
| 1986 | Jason Dunstall | 77 |
| 1987 | Jason Dunstall (2) | 94 |
| 1988 | Jason Dunstall+ (3) | 132 |
| 1989 | Jason Dunstall+ (4) | 138 |
| 1990 | Jason Dunstall (5) | 83 |
| 1991 | Jason Dunstall (6) | 82 |
| 1992 | Jason Dunstall+ (7) | 145 |
| 1993 | Jason Dunstall (8) | 123 |
| 1994 | Jason Dunstall (9) | 101 |
| 1995 | Jason Dunstall (10) | 66 |
| 1996 | Jason Dunstall (11) | 101 |
| 1997 | Nick Holland | 29 |
| 1998 | Jason Dunstall (12) | 54 |
| 1999 | Aaron Lord | 42 |
| 2000 | Nick Holland (2) | 51 |
| 2001 | John Barker | 47 |
| 2002 | Daniel Chick | 31 |
| 2003 | Nathan Thompson | 38 |
| 2004 | Nathan Thompson (2) | 36 |
| 2005 | Mark Williams | 63 |
| 2006 | Mark Williams (2) | 60 |
| 2007 | Lance Franklin | 73 |
| 2008 | Lance Franklin+ (2) | 113 |
| 2009 | Lance Franklin (3) | 67 |
| 2010 | Lance Franklin (4) | 64 |
| 2011 | Lance Franklin+ (5) | 82 |
| 2012 | Lance Franklin (6) | 69 |
| 2013 | Jarryd Roughead+ | 72 |
| 2014 | Jarryd Roughead (2) | 75 |
| 2015 | Jack Gunston^ | 57 |
| 2016 | Jack Gunston^ (2) | 51 |
| 2017 | Jarryd Roughead (3) | 38 |
| 2018 | Luke Breust | 54 |
| 2019 | Luke Breust (2) | 34 |
| 2020 | Jack Gunston^ (3) | 31 |
| 2021 | Luke Breust (3) | 33 |
| 2022 | Luke Breust (4) | 40 |
| 2023 | Luke Breust (5) | 47 |
| 2024 | Mabior Chol^ | 37 |
| 2025 | Jack Gunston^ (4) | 73 |
| 2026 | Jack Gunston^ (5) | 66 |

=== Multiple winners ===
| Player | Wins | Seasons |
|---|---|---|
| Jason Dunstall | 12 | 1986, 1987, 1988, 1989, 1990, 1991, 1992, 1993, 1994, 1995, 1996, 1998 |
| John Peck | 8 | 1956, 1958, 1961, 1962, 1963, 1964, 1965, 1966 |
| Lance Franklin | 6 | 2007, 2008, 2009, 2010, 2011, 2012 |
| Peter Hudson | 6 | 1967, 1968, 1969, 1970, 1971, 1977 |
| Leigh Matthews | 6 | 1973, 1975, 1981, 1982, 1983, 1984 |
| Luke Breust | 5 | 2018, 2019, 2021, 2022, 2023 |
| Jack Gunston^ | 5 | 2015, 2016, 2020, 2025, 2026 |
| Bert Hyde | 5 | 1926, 1927, 1928, 1929, 1930 |
| Michael Moncrieff | 5 | 1974, 1976, 1978, 1979, 1980 |
| Alec Albiston | 4 | 1939, 1941, 1942, 1945 |
| Albert Prior | 4 | 1946, 1947, 1948, 1949 |
| Kevin Coghlan | 3 | 1953, 1954, 1955 |
| Jarryd Roughead | 3 | 2013, 2014, 2017 |
| Wally Culpitt | 2 | 1943, 1944 |
| Jack Green | 2 | 1934, 1935 |
| Norm Hillard | 2 | 1936, 1937 |
| Nick Holland | 2 | 1997, 2000 |
| Alby Naismith | 2 | 1938, 1940 |
| Jack L. Ryan | 2 | 1931, 1932 |
| Nathan Thompson | 2 | 2003, 2004 |
| Mark Williams | 2 | 2005, 2006 |
| Garry Young | 2 | 1959, 1960 |

== AFL Women's leading goalkicker ==
| Season | Leading goalkicker | Goals |
|---|---|---|
| 2022 (S7) | Jess Duffin | 7 |
| 2023 | Áine McDonagh^ | 10 |
| 2024 | Âine McDonagh^ (2) | 16 |
| 2025 | Âine McDonagh^ (3) | 22 |

=== Multiple winners ===
| Player | Wins | Seasons |
|---|---|---|
| Áine McDonagh^ | 3 | 2023, 2024, 2025 |
