= 1944 Hawthorn Football Club season =

20th season in the Victorian Football League

Hawthorn Football Club
1944 season
- President: Dr. Jacob Jona
- Coach: Tommy Lahiff
- Captain: Jim Bohan
- Home ground: Glenferrie Oval
- VFL Season: 2–15–1 (11th)
- Finals Series: Did not qualify
- Best and Fairest: Jack Blackman
- Leading goalkicker: Wally Culpitt (57)
- Highest home attendance: 12,000 (Round 1 vs. Essendon, Round 8 vs. Fitzroy)
- Lowest home attendance: 5,000 (Round 17 vs. North Melbourne)
- Average home attendance: 9,556

The 1944 season was the Hawthorn Football Club's 20th season in the Victorian Football League and 43rd overall.

== Fixture ==
=== Premiership Season ===
The VFL went back to an 18-round season after Geelong rejoined the competition due to the wartime travel restriction being relaxed.

Rd	Date and local time	Opponent	Scores (Hawthorn's scores indicated in bold)			Venue	Attendance	Record
Rd	Date and local time	Opponent	Home	Away	Result	Venue	Attendance	Record
1	Saturday, 6 May (2:45 pm)	Essendon	**9.14 (68)**	15.16 (106)	Lost by 38 points	Glenferrie Oval (H)	12,000	0–1
2	Saturday, 13 May (2:45 pm)	Carlton	18.16 (124)	**9.14 (68)**	Lost by 56 points	Princes Park (A)	11,000	0–2
3	Saturday, 20 May (2:45 pm)	Geelong	**22.12 (144)**	13.13 (91)	Won by 53 points	Glenferrie Oval (H)	8,000	1–2
4	Saturday, 27 May (2:45 pm)	St Kilda	9.12 (66)	**11.7 (73)**	Won by 7 points	Junction Oval (A)	10,000	2–2
5	Saturday, 3 June (2:30 pm)	Collingwood	**8.9 (57)**	10.13 (73)	Lost by 16 points	Glenferrie Oval (H)	11,000	2–3
6	Saturday, 10 June (2:30 pm)	North Melbourne	21.16 (142)	**17.11 (113)**	Lost by 29 points	Arden Street Oval (A)	10,000	2–4
7	Saturday, 17 June (2:30 pm)	Fitzroy	14.13 (97)	**7.10 (52)**	Lost by 45 points	Brunswick Street Oval (A)	10,000	2–5
8	Saturday, 24 June (2:30 pm)	Footscray	**9.10 (64)**	14.18 (102)	Lost by 38 points	Glenferrie Oval (H)	12,000	2–6
9	Saturday, 1 July (2:30 pm)	South Melbourne	15.12 (102)	**11.11 (77)**	Lost by 25 points	Junction Oval (A)	12,000	2–7
10	Saturday, 8 July (2:30 pm)	Richmond	**11.9 (75)**	13.16 (94)	Lost by 19 points	Glenferrie Oval (H)	11,000	2–8
11	Saturday, 15 July (2:30 pm)	Melbourne	**7.10 (52)**	22.25 (157)	Lost by 105 points	Glenferrie Oval (H)	10,000	2–9
12	Saturday, 22 July (2:30 pm)	Essendon	19.18 (132)	**3.7 (25)**	Lost by 107 points	Windy Hill (A)	8,000	2–10
13	Saturday, 29 July (2:30 pm)	Carlton	**10.2 (62)**	13.28 (106)	Lost by 44 points	Glenferrie Oval (H)	11,000	2–11
14	Saturday, 5 August (2:45 pm)	Geelong	11.20 (86)	**9.7 (61)**	Lost by 25 points	Kardinia Park (A)	7,000	2–12
15	Saturday, 12 August (2:45 pm)	St Kilda	**12.16 (88)**	12.16 (88)	Draw	Glenferrie Oval (H)	6,000	2–12–1
16	Saturday, 19 August (2:45 pm)	Collingwood	18.20 (118)	**7.14 (56)**	Lost by 72 points	Victoria Park (A)	5,000	2–13–1
17	Saturday, 26 August (2:45 pm)	North Melbourne	**12.12 (84)**	15.19 (109)	Lost by 25 points	Glenferrie Oval (H)	5,000	2–14–1
18	Saturday, 2 September (2:45 pm)	Melbourne	14.27 (111)	**6.13 (49)**	Lost by 62 points	Punt Road Oval (A)	4,000	2–15–1

== Ladder ==
(P)	Premiers
	Qualified for finals

#	Team	P	W	L	D	PF	PA	%	Pts
1	Richmond	18	13	4	1	1886	1438	131.2	54
2	Fitzroy (P)	18	13	4	1	1678	1280	131.1	54
3	Essendon	18	12	4	2	1887	1408	134.0	52
4	Footscray	18	12	5	1	1529	1430	106.9	50
5	Carlton	18	12	6	0	1656	1259	131.5	48
6	North Melbourne	18	10	8	0	1619	1614	100.3	40
7	South Melbourne	18	9	9	0	1358	1402	96.9	36
8	Melbourne	18	7	11	0	1521	1481	102.7	28
9	St Kilda	18	6	10	2	1358	1502	90.4	28
10	Collingwood	18	7	11	0	1452	1629	89.1	28
11	Hawthorn	18	2	15	1	1268	1914	66.2	10
12	Geelong	18	1	17	0	1210	2065	58.6	4

Rules for classification: 1. premiership points; 2. percentage; 3. points for
Average score: 85.3
Source: AFL Tables
