= 1937 Hawthorn Football Club season =

13th season in the Victorian Football League

Hawthorn Football Club
1937 season
- President: Dr. Jacob Jona
- Coach: Ivan McAlpine
- Captain: Ivan McAlpine
- Home ground: Glenferrie Oval
- VFL Season: 7–11 (8th)
- Finals Series: Did not qualify
- Best and Fairest: Leo Murphy
- Leading goalkicker: Norm Hillard (31)
- Highest home attendance: 18,000 (Round 8 vs. Melbourne)
- Lowest home attendance: 5,000 (Round 12 vs. North Melbourne)
- Average home attendance: 9,556

The 1937 season was the Hawthorn Football Club's 13th season in the Victorian Football League and 36th overall.

== Fixture ==
=== Premiership Season ===
| Rd | Date and local time | Opponent | Scores (Hawthorn's scores indicated in bold) | | | Venue | Attendance | Record |
| Rd | Date and local time | Opponent | Home | Away | Result | Venue | Attendance | Record |
|---|---|---|---|---|---|---|---|---|
| 1 | Saturday, 24 April (2:45 pm) | North Melbourne | 9.22 (76) | **11.12 (78)** | Won by 2 points | Arden Street Oval (A) | 11,000 | 1–0 |
| 2 | Saturday, 1 May (2:45 pm) | St Kilda | **14.15 (99)** | 15.22 (112) | Lost by 13 points | Glenferrie Oval (H) | 16,000 | 1–1 |
| 3 | Saturday, 8 May (2:45 pm) | Fitzroy | 15.15 (105) | **9.15 (69)** | Lost by 36 points | Brunswick Street Oval (A) | 9,000 | 1–2 |
| 4 | Saturday, 15 May (2:45 pm) | Essendon | **11.15 (81)** | 16.13 (109) | Lost by 28 points | Glenferrie Oval (H) | 10,000 | 1–3 |
| 5 | Saturday, 22 May (2:45 pm) | Geelong | 21.23 (149) | **7.11 (53)** | Lost by 96 points | Corio Oval (A) | 7,300 | 1–4 |
| 6 | Saturday, 29 May (2:45 pm) | South Melbourne | 15.11 (101) | **13.20 (98)** | Lost by 3 points | Lake Oval (A) | 10,000 | 1–5 |
| 7 | Saturday, 5 June (2:30 pm) | Richmond | **9.6 (60)** | 8.10 (58) | Won by 2 points | Glenferrie Oval (H) | 10,000 | 2–5 |
| 8 | Saturday, 14 June (2:30 pm) | Melbourne | **12.10 (82)** | 15.15 (105) | Lost by 23 points | Glenferrie Oval (H) | 18,000 | 2–6 |
| 9 | Saturday, 19 June (2:30 pm) | Carlton | 15.24 (114) | **8.11 (59)** | Lost by 55 points | Princes Park (A) | 11,000 | 2–7 |
| 10 | Saturday, 26 June (2:30 pm) | Footscray | **15.16 (106)** | 14.15 (99) | Won by 7 points | Glenferrie Oval (H) | 7,500 | 3–7 |
| 11 | Saturday, 3 July (2:30 pm) | Collingwood | 13.23 (101) | **6.13 (49)** | Lost by 52 points | Victoria Park (A) | 5,800 | 3–8 |
| 12 | Saturday, 10 July (2:30 pm) | North Melbourne | **9.15 (69)** | 6.15 (51) | Won by 18 points | Glenferrie Oval (H) | 5,000 | 4–8 |
| 13 | Saturday, 17 July (2:30 pm) | St Kilda | 11.15 (81) | **9.8 (62)** | Lost by 19 points | Junction Oval (A) | 9,000 | 4–9 |
| 14 | Saturday, 24 July (2:30 pm) | Fitzroy | **10.11 (71)** | 6.13 (49) | Won by 22 points | Glenferrie Oval (H) | 7,500 | 5–9 |
| 15 | Saturday, 31 July (2:30 pm) | Essendon | 11.13 (79) | **13.14 (92)** | Won by 13 points | Windy Hill (A) | 6,000 | 6–9 |
| 16 | Saturday, 14 August (2:45 pm) | Geelong | **13.13 (91)** | 17.12 (114) | Lost by 23 points | Glenferrie Oval (H) | 6,000 | 6–10 |
| 17 | Saturday, 21 August (2:45 pm) | South Melbourne | **15.12 (102)** | 10.15 (75) | Won by 27 points | Glenferrie Oval (H) | 6,000 | 7–10 |
| 18 | Saturday, 28 August (2:45 pm) | Richmond | 14.13 (97) | **13.14 (92)** | Lost by 5 points | Punt Road Oval (A) | 18,000 | 7–11 |

== Ladder ==
| (P) | Premiers |
| | Qualified for finals |

| # | Team | P | W | L | D | PF | PA | % | Pts |
|---|---|---|---|---|---|---|---|---|---|
| 1 | Geelong (P) | 18 | 15 | 3 | 0 | 1824 | 1348 | 135.3 | 60 |
| 2 | Melbourne | 18 | 15 | 3 | 0 | 1945 | 1482 | 131.2 | 60 |
| 3 | Collingwood | 18 | 13 | 5 | 0 | 1908 | 1479 | 129.0 | 52 |
| 4 | Richmond | 18 | 11 | 6 | 1 | 1647 | 1525 | 108.0 | 46 |
| 5 | Carlton | 18 | 11 | 7 | 0 | 1624 | 1464 | 110.9 | 44 |
| 6 | St Kilda | 18 | 10 | 8 | 0 | 1600 | 1580 | 101.3 | 40 |
| 7 | Fitzroy | 18 | 7 | 11 | 0 | 1386 | 1488 | 93.1 | 28 |
| 8 | Hawthorn | 18 | 7 | 11 | 0 | 1413 | 1675 | 84.4 | 28 |
| 9 | South Melbourne | 18 | 6 | 11 | 1 | 1527 | 1698 | 89.9 | 26 |
| 10 | Essendon | 18 | 5 | 13 | 0 | 1530 | 1689 | 90.6 | 20 |
| 11 | Footscray | 18 | 4 | 14 | 0 | 1409 | 1722 | 81.8 | 16 |
| 12 | North Melbourne | 18 | 3 | 15 | 0 | 1188 | 1851 | 64.2 | 12 |

Rules for classification: 1. premiership points; 2. percentage; 3. points for
Average score: 88.0
Source: AFL Tables
