= Arthur Pearson =

Arthur Pearson may refer to:

- Arthur Pearson (British politician) (1897–1980), British Labour Party Member of Parliament for Pontypridd, 1938–1970
- Sir Arthur Pearson, 1st Baronet (1866–1921), British newspaper magnate and publisher
- Arthur Maurice Pearson (1890–1976), Canadian Senator from Saskatchewan
- Arthur Pearson (footballer) (1896–1963), Australian footballer
- Arthur Anselm Pearson (1874–1954), English mycologist
- Arthur MacDonald Pearson (born 1936), political figure in the Yukon, Canada

== See also ==
- Arthur Pierson
