= Jack Green (footballer, born 1905) =

Australian rules footballer (1905–1960)

Personal information
- Full name: John Joseph Patrick Green
- Born: 29 September 1905; Brunswick, Victoria
- Died: 28 May 1960 (aged 54); South Melbourne, Victoria
- Original team: University Blacks (VAFA)
- Height: 182 cm (6 ft 0 in)
- Weight: 77 kg (170 lb)

Playing career^{1}
Years	Club	Games (Goals)
1929–1933	Carlton	86 (109)
1934–1936	Hawthorn	40 (167)
Total		126 (276)
- ^{1} Playing statistics correct to the end of 1936.

Career highlights
- Hawthorn leading goalkicker: 1934 & 1935

John Joseph Patrick Green (29 September 1905 – 28 May 1960) was an Australian rules footballer who played for Carlton and Hawthorn in the Victorian Football League (VFL).

== Family ==
The son of John Joseph Green (1869-1920), and Mary Magdalene Green (c.1862-c.1961), née Hall, John Joseph Patrick Green was born in Brunswick, Victoria on 29 September 1905.

He was the older brother of the Carlton footballer, Bob Green, and both brothers played together (Jack on the half-forward flank, and Bob on the wing) for Victoria, against South Australia on 3 August 1935.

He married Norma Gwendolyn Gabell (1910-1970) on 26 September 1934. They had two children.

== Football ==
=== University Blacks ===
He played, as full-forward, for the University Blacks from 1926 to 1928, scoring 66 goals in the 1926 season, 106 goals in the 1927 season, and 118 goals in just thirteen matches in 1928.

=== Carlton ===
Green started his VFL career with Carlton and was used as a key position player. During this time he earned selection for the Victorian interstate side.

=== Hawthorn ===
He moved to Hawthorn for the 1934 season and played at full-forward.

In his first season at Hawthorn he kicked a club record 80 goals. It remained a record until 1968 when it was bettered by Peter Hudson. He again topped Hawthorn's goal-kicking the following season with 63 goals.

== Legal career ==
Graduating Bachelor of Laws (LL.B.) from the University of Melbourne on 13 April 1929, he was admitted to the Victorian Bar (as a barrister and solicitor) on 1 May 1930.

== Death ==
He died at South Melbourne, Victoria on 28 May 1960.
