= Mark Williams (Australian footballer, born 1983) =

Australian rules footballer

Personal information
- Full name: Mark Williams
- Born: 13 April 1983 (age 43)
- Original team: South Fremantle colts
- Draft: No. 43, 2000 national draft
- Debut: Round 1, 2002, Hawthorn vs. Melbourne, at Melbourne Cricket Ground
- Height: 180 cm (5 ft 11 in)
- Weight: 81 kg (179 lb)
- Position: Forward

Playing career^{1}
Years	Club	Games (Goals)
2001–2009	Hawthorn	111 (242)
2010–2011	Essendon	4 (5)
Total		115 (247)

Representative team honours^{2}
Years	Team	Games (Goals)
2003	Indigenous All-Stars	1 (0)
- ^{1} Playing statistics correct to the end of 2011.^{2} Representative statistics correct as of 2003.

Career highlights
- AFL premiership player: 2008; 2× Hawthorn leading goalkicker: 2005, 2006; VFL premiership player: 2001

Mark Williams (born 13 April 1983) is an Indigenous former Australian rules football player who played with the Hawthorn Football Club and Essendon Football Club in the Australian Football League. He was traded from the Hawks to the Bombers during the 2009 AFL trade week.

== Career ==
Making his debut in 2002 after being drafted by the Hawks at pick 43 in the 2000 AFL draft, Williams was originally a small forward, but coach Alastair Clarkson found that he was more useful as a full forward during the 2005 season, where he kicked 63 goals, making him the leading goal kicker of the club. Known for his flamboyance, pace and use of the "shotgun", a trademark celebration he used to use after kicking a goal, Williams was one of a number of young players at Hawthorn.

Williams finished 2006 with a total of 60 goals, again becoming was the leading goalkicker at the Hawks. A knee injury cut short his 2007 season after only four games leaving him stranded on 13 goals.

Williams attracted controversy in 2008 when he made a choking gesture targeted at then-Port Adelaide coach, Mark Williams. This was in reference to the then-Port Adelaide coach's famous choking gesture when the Power won the 2004 Premiership. Williams was warned that he would be "shown the door" if he performed such an action again.

In the 2008 Grand Final, Williams and Stuart Dew kicked four goals in three minutes to put Hawthorn in a winning position late in the third quarter. Williams' three goals was the most by any player during the Grand Final.

In 2009, Williams injured his knee and missed almost half of that season's games.

The 2009 post-season trade week saw Williams traded to Essendon in a complex trade involving four clubs. He had a disappointing debut game for Essendon, when the Bombers were beaten by Geelong at the MCG. It was not a great night for Williams as he gathered just eight disposals and was kept scoreless in the match.

In the twilight of his career, Williams was unable to gain senior selection and played with Essendon's Victorian Football League affiliate the Bendigo Bombers, until his retirement which was announced on 25 July 2011.

Williams agreed to play with Ballan in the Central Highlands Football League for 2012 and 2013.

Williams became the inaugural coach of Western Region Football League club Newport Power at the end of 2015. In his first season in charge, he steered the club to premiership success.

== Statistics ==
Legend
G	Goals	K	Kicks	D	Disposals	T	Tackles
B	Behinds	H	Handballs	M	Marks

Season	Team	No.	Games	Totals							Averages (per game)							Votes
Season	Team	No.	Games	G	B	K	H	D	M	T	G	B	K	H	D	M	T	Votes
2001	Hawthorn	6	0	—	—	—	—	—	—	—	—	—	—	—	—	—	—	0
2002	Hawthorn	6	3	1	1	5	1	6	1	3	0.3	0.3	1.7	0.3	2.0	0.3	1.0	0
2003	Hawthorn	6	9	10	9	43	17	60	30	23	1.1	1.0	4.8	1.9	6.7	3.3	2.6	0
2004	Hawthorn	6	21	33	12	86	36	122	46	26	1.6	0.6	4.1	1.7	5.8	2.2	1.2	0
2005	Hawthorn	6	19	63	35	141	20	161	87	25	3.3	1.8	7.4	1.1	8.5	4.6	1.3	3
2006	Hawthorn	6	20	60	26	143	34	177	93	22	3.0	1.3	7.2	1.7	8.9	4.7	1.1	5
2007	Hawthorn	6	4	13	5	25	12	37	11	5	3.3	1.3	6.3	3.0	9.3	2.8	1.3	0
2008^{#}	Hawthorn	6	22	46	32	206	72	278	126	37	2.1	1.5	9.4	3.3	12.6	5.7	1.7	3
2009	Hawthorn	6	13	16	7	106	48	154	64	24	1.2	0.5	8.2	3.7	11.8	4.9	1.8	0
2010	Essendon	33	4	5	0	25	6	31	8	6	1.3	0.0	6.3	1.5	7.8	2.0	1.5	0
2011	Essendon	33	0	—	—	—	—	—	—	—	—	—	—	—	—	—	—	0
Career:			115	247	127	780	246	1026	466	171	2.1	1.1	6.8	2.1	8.9	4.1	1.5	11

== Honours and achievements ==
Team

- AFL premiership player (Hawthorn): 2008
- VFL premiership player (Box Hill): 2001

Individual

- 2× Hawthorn leading goalkicker: 2005, 2006
- Indigenous All-Stars team: 2003
