= Ernie Loveless =

Australian rules footballer, born 1907

Personal information
- Full name: Ernest Joseph Field Loveless
- Born: 6 December 1907; St Kilda, Victoria
- Died: 21 December 1950 (aged 43); St Kilda, Victoria
- Original team: St Kilda District
- Height: 175 cm (5 ft 9 in)
- Weight: 76 kg (168 lb)

Playing career^{1}
Years	Club	Games (Goals)
1926–1929, 1931	St Kilda	42 (2)
1933–1936	Hawthorn	56 (1)
Total		98 (3)
- ^{1} Playing statistics correct to the end of 1936.

Career highlights
- Hawthorn best and fairest: 1934

Ernest Joseph Field Loveless (6 December 1907 – 21 Dec 1950) was an Australian rules footballer who played for St Kilda and Hawthorn in the VFL.

Loveless played in the back pocket and started his career with St Kilda.

Loveless was captain coach of the Wangaratta Football Club in the Ovens & Murray Football League in 1930. Loveless was captain-coach of the O&MFL team that lost to the Goulburn Valley Football League in 1930.

He crossed to Hawthorn in 1933 and was a best and fairest winner the following season. Loveless was vice captain of Hawthorn in 1935 and 1936, his last two years in the VFL.
