= Maurie Young =

Australian rules footballer (1937–2023)

Personal information
- Full name: Maurice Albert Young
- Born: 7 March 1937
- Died: 13 February 2023 (aged 85)
- Original team: Boronia
- Height: 188 cm (6 ft 2 in)
- Weight: 87 kg (192 lb)
- Position: Ruck

Playing career^{1}
Years	Club	Games (Goals)
1952–55	Camberwell (VFA)	38 (22)
1956–60	Hawthorn	71 (59)
1961–62	East Perth	42 (32)
1963	Oakleigh (VFA)	
- ^{1} Playing statistics correct to the end of 1960.

Maurice Albert Young (7 March 1937 – 13 February 2023) was an Australian rules footballer who played with Hawthorn. Young developed into a strong ruckman. He played 71 senior games for Hawthorn between 1956 and 1960. He also played the Hawks' VFL finals campaign in 1957.

In 1961, Maurice moved to Western Australia, and played with East Perth. He played in the losing East Perth's 1961 Grand Final side.

Two years later he returned to Melbourne to be closer to family. Not required at Hawthorn Young spent 1963 playing for Oakleigh in the VFA.

He later played in premiership teams at Moe in 1967 and Eaglehawk in 1968.

== Family ==
He was the elder brother of Garry Young.

== Sources ==
- Holmesby, Russell & Main, Jim (2007). The Encyclopedia of AFL Footballers. 7th ed. Melbourne: Bas Publishing.
