= Arthur Pierson =

Arthur Pierson may refer to:

- Arthur Tappan Pierson (1837–1911), American Presbyterian pastor
- Arthur N. Pierson (1867–1957), Speaker of the New Jersey General Assembly and President of the New Jersey Senate
- Arthur Pierson (director) (1901–1975), American director and producer of film and television

== See also ==
- Arthur Pearson
