= Mick Ennis =

Australian rules footballer

Personal information
- Full name: Michael John Ennis
- Born: 25 April 1901; Carlton, Victoria
- Died: 18 April 1948 (aged 46); Malvern East, Victoria
- Original teams: Numurkah, Port Melbourne
- Height: 183 cm (6 ft 0 in)
- Weight: 70 kg (154 lb)
- Position: Forward

Playing career^{1}
Years	Club	Games (Goals)
1923–1925	Port Melbourne (VFA)	27 (75)
1925–1927	Hawthorn	19 (42)
Total		46 (117)
- ^{1} Playing statistics correct to the end of 1927.

Michael John Ennis (25 April 1901 – 18 April 1948) was an Australian rules footballer who played with Hawthorn in the Victorian Football League (VFL).

== Family ==
The eldest son of Thomas John Ennis (who played for Carlton in 1896) and Mary Josephine Ennis, née Sullivan, Michael John Ennis was born at Carlton on 25 April 1901.

== Football ==
=== Carlton reserves ===
Stated as originally being from Numurkah Football Club, Ennis played with the Carlton reserves in 1922 and 1923.

=== Port Melbourne (VFA) ===
Ennis transferred to Port Melbourne in the Victorian Football Association shortly before the 1923 final series. Ennis made 27 appearances for Port Melbourne, including playing in their losing 1923 Grand Final side and kicking 62 goals in the 1924 season.

=== Hawthorn ===
Ennis joined Hawthorn early in the 1925 VFL season and made 19 appearances over his three seasons with Hawthorn, scoring 42 goals, but failed to cement a regular starting position. He retired at the end of the 1927 season.

== Later life ==
In 1930 Ennis married Verna Mary Murcutt (1902–1984) and they had four children before he died at the age of 46.

Mick Ennis is buried at Box Hill Cemetery.
