= Cyril Nott =

Australian rules footballer

- Nott in May 1925

Personal information
- Full name: Cyril Edwin Henry Nott
- Born: 4 December 1898; Hawthorn, Victoria
- Died: 10 October 1980 (aged 81); Glen Iris, Victoria
- Original team: Hawthorn (VFA)
- Debut: Round 3, 1921, Richmond vs. Fitzroy, at Brunswick Street Oval
- Height: 180 cm (5 ft 11 in)
- Weight: 70 kg (154 lb)
- Position: forward

Playing career^{1}
Years	Club	Games (Goals)
1919–1920	Hawthorn (VFA)	27 (23)
1921–1922	Richmond	5 (1)
1923–1924	Hawthorn (VFA)	35 (2)
1925–1926	Hawthorn	18 (1)
1927–1930	Oakleigh	24 (0)
- ^{1} Playing statistics correct to the end of 1930.

Cyril Edwin Henry Nott (4 December 1898 – 10 October 1980) was an Australian rules footballer who played with Richmond and Hawthorn in the Victorian Football League (VFL).

== Early life ==
The eldest son of Henry George Nott and Annie Monica Nott, nee Raftery, Cyril Edwin Henry Nott was born at Hawthorn, Victoria on 4 December 1898.

== Football ==
Cyril Nott was a forward and originally played for Hawthorn from 1919 to 1920 in the Victorian Football Association (VFA). He joined Richmond for the 1921–1922 seasons but only managed five games and returned to Hawthorn in 1923. After Hawthorn was admitted to the VFL in 1925, Nott played a further 18 VFL games.

In 1927 Nott accepted a position at Oakleigh Football Club as captain-coach. He stepped down as coach at the end of the season but continued to play for Oakleigh (who were admitted to the VFA in 1929) until 1930.

== Later life ==
Cyril Nott married Eileen Ruby Goodwin in 1929 and they lived in Bentleigh for over 30 years. He worked as a journalist for the Sporting Globe after retiring from football and served in World War II.

Cyril Nott died in 1980, at the age of 81, and is buried at Springvale Botanical Cemetery.
