= Alf Hughes =

Australian rules footballer (1930–2019)

Personal information
- Full name: Alfred Norman Hughes
- Born: 25 June 1930
- Died: 16 June 2019 (aged 88)
- Original team: East Brunswick
- Height: 178 cm (5 ft 10 in)
- Weight: 76 kg (168 lb)

Playing career^{1}
Years	Club	Games (Goals)
1953–1959	Hawthorn	107 (0)
- ^{1} Playing statistics correct to the end of 1959.

Career highlights
- Hawthorn best and fairest: 1957

Alfred Norman Hughes (25 June 1930 – 16 June 2019) was an Australian rules footballer who played for Hawthorn in the VFL during the 1950s.

Hughes was recruited from East Brunswick and played mainly in the back pockets for Hawthorn. In 1957 he won Hawthorn's best and fairest award and finished equal 7th in the Brownlow Medal count.

== Honours and achievements ==
Individual

- Hawthorn best and fairest: 1957
- Hawthorn life member
