= Fred Brown (Australian footballer) =

Australian rules footballer

Personal information
- Full name: Frederick Elphinstone Brown
- Born: 30 January 1896; Hobart, Tasmania
- Died: 18 December 1971 (aged 75); Caulfield, Victoria
- Original team: Caulfield
- Height: 185 cm (6 ft 1 in)
- Weight: 86 kg (190 lb)

Playing career^{1}
Years	Club	Games (Goals)
1922–1924	Hawthorn (VFA)	37 (7)
1925–1926	Hawthorn	4 (0)
Total		41 (7)
- ^{1} Playing statistics correct to the end of 1926.

Frederick Elphinstone Brown (30 January 1896 – 18 December 1971) was an Australian rules footballer who played with Hawthorn in the Victorian Football League (VFL).

== Family ==
The son of James Brown (1870–1899) and Janet Brown (1872–1959), nee West, Frederick Elphinstone Brown was born at Hobart on 30 January 1896.

Brown married Lillian Edna Daisy Shillinglaw on 2 September 1916 at St Matthew's Anglican Church in Prahran. Brown and Shillinglaw divorced in 1935 and Brown married Lila Grace Cain, nee Allday, (1905–1986) in 1936. They had one child together, Bruce David Allen Brown. Bruce married Sandra Hill and had three children. Charmaine, Langdon and Travis. Travis married Lauren Norton and had three children, Preston, Carter and Anika Brown

== World War I ==
Brown enlisted to serve in World War I in February 1917, seeing action in France before returning to Australia in 1919. Service number 4758, rank Private. 29 Infantry Battalion - 13 and 14 Reinforcements (June-December 1917) Date of Embarkation 1917-06-21 Place of embarkation Melbourne Ship Embarked On HMAT Suevic A29

== Football ==
After playing with Caulfield Football Club, Brown joined Hawthorn at the start of the 1922 VFA season. Fred Brown, was the 24th player to ever play at the Hawthorn Football Club. and he played four games in Hawthorn's first two seasons in the VFL.

== Death ==
Fred Brown died at Caulfield on 18 December 1971 and is burled at Brighton General Cemetery.
