= Alec Hall (Australian footballer) =

Australian rules footballer & coach (1869–1953)

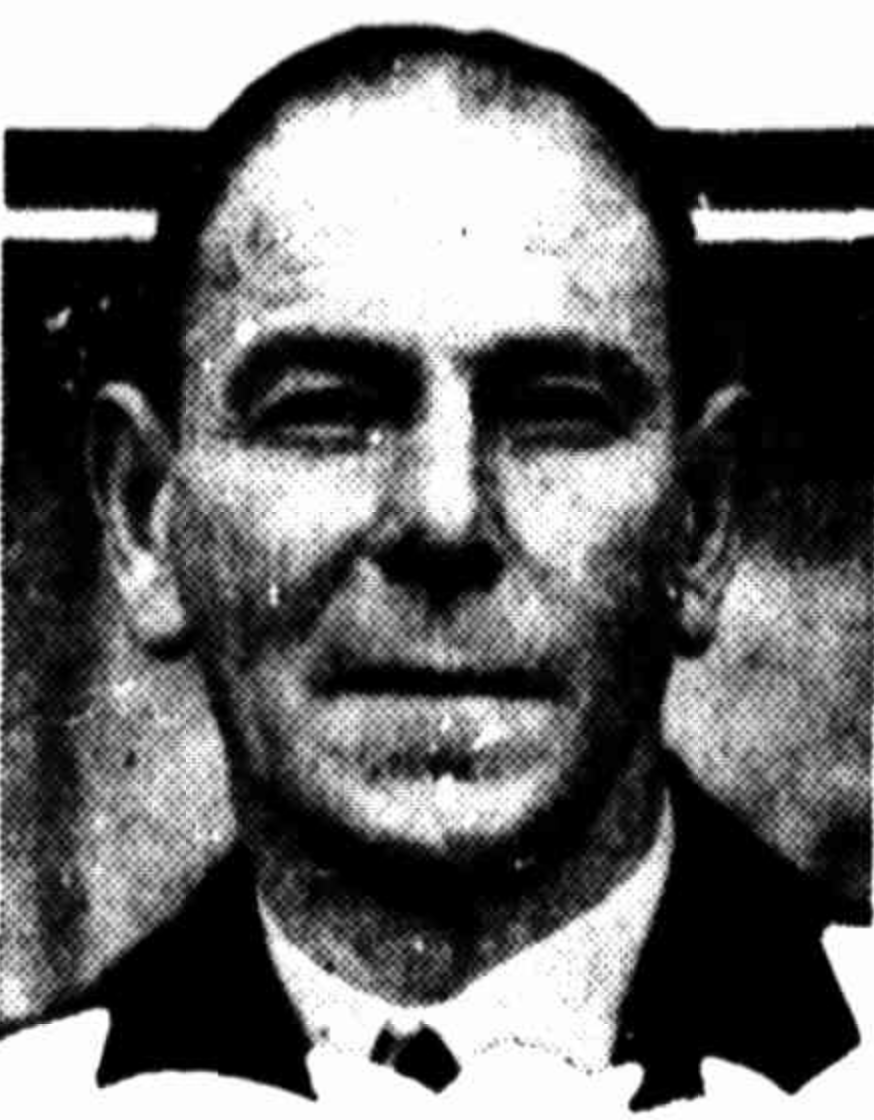
- Hall in 1935

Personal information
- Full name: Alexander James Hall
- Nickname: Joker
- Born: 4 January 1869; Geelong
- Died: 8 March 1953 (aged 84); Warrandyte, Victoria
- Original team: Preston / Essendon Association

Playing career^{1}
| Years | Club | Games (Goals) |
| 1898–1900 | Essendon | 19 (18) |
| 1906 | St Kilda | 1 (0) |
| Total | | 20 (18) |

Coaching career
| Years | Club | Games (W–L–D) |
| 1906 | St Kilda | 13 (4–9–0) |
| 1907–1909 | Melbourne | 53 (24–28–1) |
| 1910 | Richmond | 18 (7–10–1) |
| 1911–1913 | Melbourne | 36 (13–23–0) |
| 1925 | Hawthorn | 17 (3–14–0) |
| Total | | 137 (51–84–2) |
- ^{1} Playing statistics correct to the end of 1906.

Alexander James Hall (4 January 1869 – 8 March 1953) was an Australian rules footballer who played for the Essendon Football Club in the Victorian Football Association (VFA) in 1891 to 1896 then in the Victorian Football League (VFL) from 1898 to 1900. In 1906, his first year of coaching in the VFL, he played his only game for the St Kilda Football Club (under the assumed name of "Wyberg"). He went on to coach Melbourne (twice), Richmond and was Hawthorn's coach in their inaugural season in the VFL.
