= Martin Larkin =

Australian rules footballer

Personal information
- Full name: William Martin Larkin
- Born: 20 December 1903; Numurkah, Victoria
- Died: 1 July 1971 (aged 67); Ascot Vale, Victoria
- Original team: Leongatha
- Height: 182 cm (6 ft 0 in)
- Weight: 81 kg (179 lb)

Playing career^{1}
Years	Club	Games (Goals)
1925	Footscray	3 (0)
1925–1926	Hawthorn	4 (0)
Total		7 (0)
- ^{1} Playing statistics correct to the end of 1926.

William Martin Larkin (20 December 1903 – 1 July 1971) was an Australian rules footballer who played with Footscray and Hawthorn in the Victorian Football League (VFL).

== Family ==
The son of Michael Edward Larkin (1855–1929) and Catherine Ann Larkin, nee McGlone (1863–1939), William Martin Larkin was born at Numurkah on 20 December 1903.

== Football ==
After commencing his career with Leongatha, Larkin joined Footscray at the start of the 1925 VFL season and made three appearances before he transferred to Hawthorn in the middle of the season.

== Later life ==
In 1931 he married Margaret Ellen Waide, and they had two children together.

William Martin Larkin died in 1971 and is buried at Melbourne General Cemetery.
