= Wal Williams =

Australian rules footballer, born 1904

Personal information
- Full name: Walter George Williams
- Born: 21 January 1904; Scoresby, Victoria
- Died: 23 August 1982 (aged 78); Albury, New South Wales
- Original team: Box Hill
- Height: 180 cm (5 ft 11 in)
- Weight: 75 kg (165 lb)
- Position: Forward

Playing career^{1}
| Years | Club | Games (Goals) |
| 1925–1927 | Hawthorn | 17 (7) |
- ^{1} Playing statistics correct to the end of 1927.

Walter George "Wal" Williams (21 January 1904 – 23 August 1982) was an Australian rules footballer who played with Hawthorn in the Victorian Football League (VFL).

== Family ==
The son of George James Williams (1867–1956) and Marian Williams (1871–1961), nee Lording, Walter George Williams was born in Scoresby, Victoria in January 1904.

== Football ==
Williams commenced his football career at Box Hill. When Hawthorn joined the VFL for the 1925 VFL season, Williams was recruited to the club. He made his debut in round 2 and played four games before being suspended for the rest of the season for abusing an umpire. He played regularly in 1926 and the first game of 1927 before being dropped from the team.

== Later life ==
In December 1927, Walter Williams married Mary McPherson Crombie and they lived in Myrtleford before moving to Albury, where they lived until Williams' death in 1982.
