= Allan Woodley =

Australian rules footballer

Personal information
- Full name: Allan George Woodley
- Born: 22 August 1935 (age 91); Melbourne
- Original team: Xavier College
- Height: 193 cm (6 ft 4 in)
- Weight: 89 kg (196 lb)

Playing career^{1}
Years	Club	Games (Goals)
1954–59, 1963	Hawthorn	130 (56)
- ^{1} Playing statistics correct to the end of 1963.

Career highlights
- Hawthorn best and fairest: 1959

Allan George Woodley (born 22 August 1935) was an Australian rules footballer who played for Hawthorn in the VFL during the 1950s. A follower, he was also known by his nickname 'The Colonel'.

Woodley began his Hawthorn career in 1954 after being recruited from Xavier College. He was chosen to represent Victoria at the 1956 Perth Carnival and won Hawthorn's Best and Fairest in 1959. In 1960 he went to England to study but returned in 1963 for one last season.
