= Garry Young (footballer) =

Australian rules footballer

Personal information
- Born: 10 July 1939 (age 87)
- Original team: Boronia
- Height: 183 cm (6 ft 0 in)
- Weight: 84 kg (185 lb)

Playing career^{1}
Years	Club	Games (Goals)
1956–1965	Hawthorn	108 (164)
- ^{1} Playing statistics correct to the end of 1965.

Career highlights
- VFL premiership player : 1961; 2× Hawthorn leading goalkicker: 1959, 1960

Garry Young (born 10 July 1939) is a former Australian rules footballer who played for Hawthorn in the Victorian Football League (VFL).

A key position forward, Young topped Hawthorn's goalkicking in 1959 and 1960 and was a premiership player in 1961.

== Family ==
Garry's brother Maurie Young played 71 games for Hawthorn between 1956 and 1960. and his son garry young and 4 other siblings

== Honours and achievements ==
Hawthorn

- VFL premiership player: 1961
- 2× Minor premiership: 1961, 1963

Individual

- 2× Hawthorn leading goalkicker: 1959, 1960
- Hawthorn life member
