= Wally Culpitt =

Australian rules footballer

Personal information
- Full name: Walter Henry Culpitt
- Born: 14 January 1918; Mount Hawthorn, Western Australia
- Died: 15 October 1994 (aged 76)
- Original team: East Hawthorn
- Height: 178 cm (5 ft 10 in)
- Weight: 76 kg (168 lb)

Playing career^{1}
Years	Club	Games (Goals)
1940–1948	Hawthorn	125 (116)
- ^{1} Playing statistics correct to the end of 1948.

Career highlights
- Hawthorn best and fairest: 1947; 2× Hawthorn leading goalkicker: 1943, 1944

Walter Henry Culpitt (14 January 1918 – 15 October 1994) was an Australian rules footballer who played for Hawthorn in the VFL during the 1940s.

Culpitt was a key position player and started his career in defence. The 1943 season saw him pushed to full forward and he topped Hawthorn's goalkicking with 43 goals, and again the following season with 57 goals.

For the rest of his career he was used mostly at fullback and it was in that position that he was chosen to represent Victoria at the 1947 Hobart Carnival. It had been a good year for Culpitt, he won Hawthorn's best and fairest and finished equal third in the Brownlow Medal count.

When Culpitt left Hawthorn he accepted a position as captain-coach of Wimmera's team of Minyip. After two years in Minyip, Culpitt was on the move.

In 1951 he coached Kyneton and the following year he coached Castlemaine to the Bendigo Football League premiership.

In 1953, Culpitt fell 25 feet down from a telephone pole at Newstead and fractured his arm.
