= Pat Kennedy (footballer, born 1903) =

Australian rules footballer

Personal information
- Full name: Patrick Alphonsus Kennedy
- Born: 29 July 1903; Cobram, Victoria
- Died: 21 August 1981 (aged 78); Glen Huntly, Victoria
- Original teams: Sth Melbourne CYMS (CYMSFA)/ University Blacks
- Height: 168 cm (5 ft 6 in)
- Weight: 62 kg (137 lb)

Playing career^{1}
Years	Club	Games (Goals)
1923–25	Carlton	23 (15)
1925	Hawthorn	3 (1)
Total		26 (16)
- ^{1} Playing statistics correct to the end of 1925.

Patrick Alphonsus Kennedy (29 July 1903 – 21 August 1981) was an Australian rules footballer who played with Carlton and Hawthorn in the Victorian Football League (VFL).

== Family ==
The youngest son of Daniel Joseph Kennedy (1857–1934) and Bridget Teresa Kennedy, née Noonan (1860–1931), Patrick Alphonsus Kennedy was born at Cobram on 29 July 1903.

== Football ==
Kennedy played VFL football while studying engineering at the University of Melbourne. He was cleared to Carlton from Cobram on in July 1923 and he played 23 games for them over the next couple of years.

In June 1925 Kennedy was cleared to Hawthorn where he added three games to his VFL tally before he returned to Carlton, becoming a member of their 1927 Reserve premiership squad.

Kennedy was subsequently cleared to Sandringham in June 1929 where he played two games.

== Military service ==
Kennedy later served as a major in the Australian Survey Corps from his enlistment during World War II until July 1958.

== Death ==
Patrick Alphonsus Kennedy died in August 1981 and is buried at Springvale Botanical Cemetery.
