= Bert Officer =

Australian rules footballer

- Pickford in May 1925

Personal information
- Full name: Albert Edward Officer
- Born: 15 November 1899; St Kilda, Victoria
- Died: 21 December 1957 (aged 58); Fremantle, Western Australia
- Original team: Grosvenor
- Debut: Round 8, 1922, St Kilda vs. Geelong, at Corio Oval
- Height: 182 cm (6 ft 0 in)
- Weight: 80 kg (176 lb)
- Position: Forward

Playing career^{1}
Years	Club	Games (Goals)
1922–1924	St Kilda	6 (10)
1924	Hawthorn (VFA)	10 (21)
1925	Hawthorn	12 (6)
1929	Oakleigh (VFA)	9 (15)
- ^{1} Playing statistics correct to the end of 1929.

Albert Edward "Bert" Officer (15 November 1899 – 21 December 1957) was an Australian rules footballer who played with St Kilda and Hawthorn in the Victorian Football League (VFL).

== Early life ==
Officer was born Albert Edward Wood, the son of Minnie Wood, in St Kilda on 15 November 1899. He grew up in the St Kilda area.

== War service ==
Officer enlisted soon after turning 18 and served in Europe during the final months of World War I.

== Football ==
After returning to Australia, Officer played football with Grosvenor before transferring to St Kilda for the 1922 VFL season. He struggled to gain a place in the St Kilda side, playing only six games over his three seasons at the club.

Officer transferred to Hawthorn during the 1924 season and played 12 games in their first VFL season in 1925. He failed to play a senior game after that but was the leading goal-kicker for Hawthorn's reserve team in 1926. Officer transferred to Oakleigh in 1929 when they were admitted to Victorian Football Association.

== Later life ==
Bert Officer married Elizabeth Mary McCormick at St Patrick's Cathedral, Melbourne in November 1931. The wedding was delayed twice, as they could not afford the costs as he had to have two operations to have shrapnel removed from his legs received during World War I. They had three children together and Bert Officer worked for the Commonwealth Investigation Service in Melbourne, Hobart and Perth.

Albert Officer died suddenly from a heart attack in December 1957 and is buried at Brighton General Cemetery.
