= Fred Finch (footballer) =

Australian rules footballer

- Finch in May 1925

Personal information
- Full name: Frederick John Finch
- Nickname: Snowy
- Born: 6 October 1895; Brunswick, Victoria
- Died: 18 April 1952 (aged 56); Prahran, Victoria
- Original team: Burwood Football Club
- Debut: Round 1, 1925, Hawthorn vs. Richmond, at Glenferrie Oval
- Height: 183 cm (6 ft 0 in)
- Weight: 84 kg (185 lb)
- Position: centre

Playing career^{1}
Years	Club	Games (Goals)
1922–1924	Hawthorn (VFA)	49 (5)
1925–1927	Hawthorn	37 (10)
- ^{1} Playing statistics correct to the end of 1927.

Career highlights
- Hawthorn best all rounder: 1925

Frederick John Finch (6 October 1895 – 18 April 1952) was an Australian rules footballer who played with Hawthorn in the Victorian Football League (VFL).

== Early life ==
The son of George Fagan and Ellen Berry, Frederick John Finch was born at Brunswick on 6 October 1895.

Fred Finch enlisted to serve in World War I in late 1914 and served until the end of the war.

== Cricket ==
Finch was an accomplished cricketer and played for Northcote Cricket Club in the Victorian District cricket competition from 1920 to 1922. He was a fast bowler and took a hat-trick against Fitzroy in the 1920–21 season.

== Football ==
After a stint with Burwood Football Club, Finch joined Hawthorn at the start of the 1922 season when Hawthorn was in the Victorian Football Association. He earned the nickname "Snowy" from his very fair hair and had a reputation for never missing a night's training. He played mostly in the centre, and won Hawthorn Football Club's best all-round player in their first season of VFL football. From 1927 to 1929 he played predominantly in the Hawthorn reserves team before retiring to football administration roles within the club.

== Later life ==
In 1924 Finch married Dulcie May Jones (née Stokes) and they lived in Glen Iris, Victoria with her two children from her first marriage.

Fred Finch died in 1952 at the age of 56.

== Honours and achievements ==
Individual

- Hawthorn best all rounder: 1925
- Hawthorn life member
