= Jack Sharpley =

Australian rules footballer, born 1906

Personal information
- Full name: Thomas John Sharpley
- Born: 30 September 1968; Maffra, Victoria
- Died: 30 September 1968 (aged 62); Fitzroy, Victoria
- Original team: Kerang

Playing career^{1}
Years	Club	Games (Goals)
1926–1927	Footscray	8 (2)
1927–1932	Hawthorn	41 (1)
Total		49 (3)
- ^{1} Playing statistics correct to the end of 1932.

Career highlights
- Hawthorn best and fairest: 1930

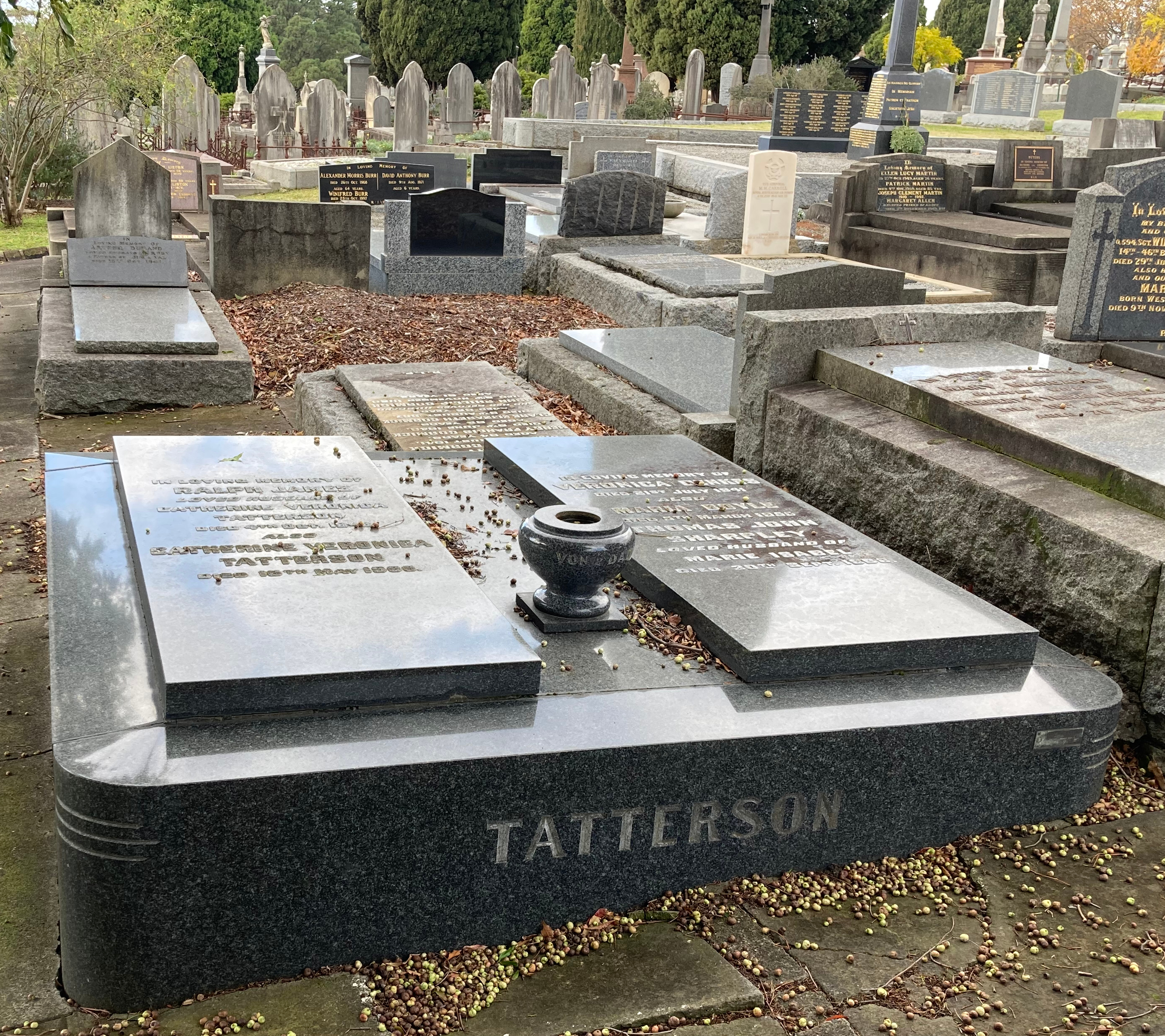
Sharpley's grave at Boroondara General Cemetery

Thomas John Sharpley (18 February 1906 – 30 September 1968) was an Australian rules footballer who played with Footscray and Hawthorn in the Victorian Football League (VFL).

A full back, Sharpley started his league career in 1926 with Footscray and played with them for a season and a half before moving to Hawthorn where he played with his brother Keith. In 1930, Sharpley won Hawthorn Football Club's Best and Fairest award, later known as the Peter Crimmins Medal, and finished equal fourth in the Brownlow Medal.
