= Jack Pickford (footballer) =

Australian rules footballer

- Pickford in May 1925

Personal information
- Full name: Wilfred Hilary Pickford
- Born: 18 April 1904; Mildura, Victoria
- Died: 6 July 1971 (aged 67); Launceston, Tasmania
- Original team: Hawthorn Juniors
- Height: 174 cm (5 ft 9 in)
- Weight: 81 kg (179 lb)

Playing career^{1}
Years	Club	Games (Goals)
1922–1924	Hawthorn (VFA)	11 (0)
1925–1928	Hawthorn	55 (3)
1929–1931	Brighton (VFA)	1 (0)
1932	Melbourne	2 (0)
- ^{1} Playing statistics correct to the end of 1932.

Wilfred Hilary "Jack" Pickford, ISO (18 April 1904 – 6 July 1971) was an Australian rules footballer who played with Hawthorn and Melbourne in the Victorian Football League (VFL).

== Early life ==
Pickford was born in Mildura to Alfred Pickford and Lillian Mabel Short, but his family moved to Melbourne after his father died in 1909. He attended Swinburne Technical College where he excelled in sports, including captaining the football team.

== Football ==
Pickford played eleven games with Hawthorn in Victorian Football Association (VFA) over the period 1922–1924. In the middle of the 1924 season he transferred to Hawthorn Juniors and played in the losing Grand Final team in the Junior Competition. It was during this period that Pickford started being referred to as "Jack" (presumably derived from the Hollywood star of the time, Jack Pickford).

Pickford rejoined Hawthorn as they entered in VFL competition in 1925. He played in their first ever VFL match and appeared consistently through their first four seasons in the League. He was selected as part of a League representative team in 1927.

In 1929 Pickford transferred to VFA club Brighton where he played for three seasons. In 1932 he joined Melbourne and appeared in two games for them towards the end of the season.

== Later life ==
Pickford graduated from Swinburne Senior Technical College (now Swinburne University of Technology) as a civil engineer in 1938 and later worked for the Civil Aviation Authority. In 1969 he was appointed as Companion of the Imperial Service Order for his work as First Assistant Director-General of Civil Aviation.

Wilfred Hilary Pickford died while visiting Launceston in Tasmania in July 1971 and was cremated at Springvale Botanical Cemetery.
