= Paddy Burke (Australian footballer) =

Australian rules footballer

- Burke in May 1925

Personal information
- Full name: Edward Michael Burke
- Born: 19 August 1898; Fitzroy, Victoria
- Died: 20 June 1953 (aged 54); Hawthorn, Victoria
- Original team: Croydon
- Height: 183 cm (6 ft 0 in)
- Weight: 82 kg (181 lb)

Playing career^{1}
Years	Club	Games (Goals)
1921–1924	Hawthorn (VFA)	51 (19)
1925–1926	Hawthorn	31 (13)
- ^{1} Playing statistics correct to the end of 1926.

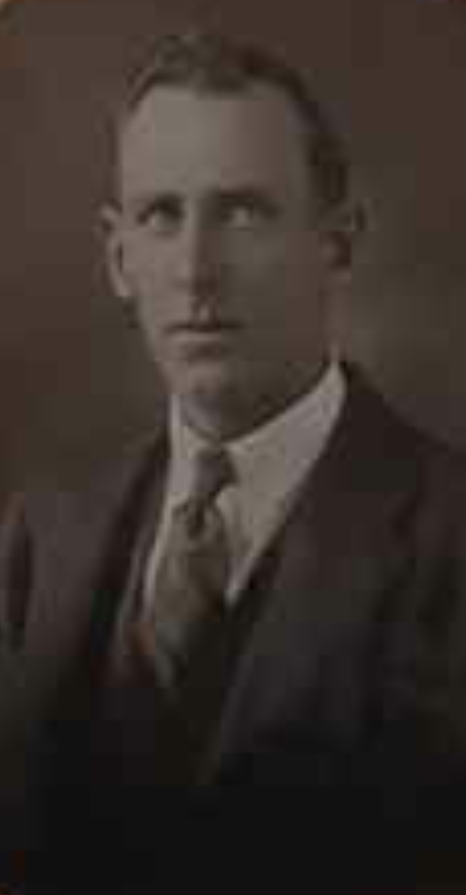
Edward Michael 'Paddy' Burke

Edward Michael 'Paddy' Burke (19 August 1898 – 20 June 1953) was an Australian rules footballer who played with Hawthorn in the Victorian Football League (VFL).

== Family and early life ==
The seventh of ten children born to Michael Joseph Burke (1861–1931) and Jane Burke, nee Robinson, (1860–1923) Edward Michael Burke was born at Fitzroy on 19 August 1898.

Prior to his senior football career Burke served in World War I, being injured several in times in fighting in France.

In 1922, he married Doris Irene Hepburn.

== Football ==
Burke, who had been recruited from Croydon in 1921, first played for Hawthorn when they were in the Victorian Football Association. He made 15 appearances for Hawthorn in the 1925 VFL season, their first in the Victorian Football League and was club captain for part of 1926.

== Later life ==
Burke died at Hawthorn in June 1953.
