= Jack Barker (Australian footballer) =

Australian rules footballer

Personal information
- Full name: Frederick John Brewer Barker
- Born: 23 December 1917; Woodend, Victoria
- Died: 29 October 1989 (aged 71)
- Original team: Woodend
- Height: 185 cm (6 ft 1 in)
- Weight: 98 kg (216 lb)

Playing career^{1}
Years	Club	Games (Goals)
1937–1945	Hawthorn	113 (21)
- ^{1} Playing statistics correct to the end of 1945.

Career highlights
- Hawthorn best and fairest: 1942

Frederick John Brewer Barker (23 December 1917 – 29 October 1989) was an Australian rules footballer who played for Hawthorn in the VFL. Barker was a centre half back and won Hawthorn's 'Best and Fairest' award in 1942.

Off the field he worked as a fireman and once played a game despite suffering smoke inhalation the previous night.
