= Pat Keary (Australian footballer) =

Australian rules footballer, born 1901

Personal information
- Full name: Patrick Joseph Keary
- Born: 10 October 1901; Richmond, Victoria
- Died: 20 February 1974 (aged 72); Fitzroy, Victoria
- Original team: Hawthorn Juniors
- Height: 180 cm (5 ft 11 in)
- Weight: 81 kg (179 lb)
- Position: Back pocket

Playing career^{1}
Years	Club	Games (Goals)
1925–1930	Hawthorn	61 (1)
- ^{1} Playing statistics correct to the end of 1930.

Patrick Joseph Keary (10 October 1901 – 20 February 1974) was an Australian rules footballer who played with Hawthorn in the Victorian Football League (VFL).

== Family ==
The son of Patrick Joseph Ambrose Keary (1886–1931), and Mary Ellen Bridget Keary (1885–1966), née Webb, Patrick Joseph Keary was born at Richmond on 10 October 1901.

== Football ==
Recruited from Hawthorn Juniors, Keary played in each of Hawthorn's first six seasons in the VFL. He scored one goal in his VFL career, registered in the final round of the 1927 season in a loss against Richmond.

After his VFL playing career, Keary managed the Hawthorn reserves for over 20 years and in recognition of his service the club named its reserves best and fairest award the Blue Keary trophy.

== Death ==
Keary died at Fitzroy in February 1974 and is buried at Boroondara General Cemetery.

== Honours and achievements ==
Individual

- Hawthorn life member
