= Leo Murphy (Australian footballer) =

Australian rules footballer, born 1909

Leo Francis Murphy

Personal information
- Born: 7 August 1909; Heidelberg, Victoria
- Died: 5 April 1999 (aged 89)
- Original team: Heidelberg (DVFL)
- Height: 185 cm (6 ft 1 in)
- Weight: 85 kg (187 lb)

Playing career^{1}
Years	Club	Games (Goals)
1930–1940	Hawthorn	132 (22)
- ^{1} Playing statistics correct to the end of 1940.

Career highlights
- 2× Hawthorn best and fairest: 1936, 1937

Leo Francis Murphy (7 August 1909 – 5 April 1999) was an Australian rules footballer who played for Hawthorn in the VFL during the 1930s. He was the father of Fitzroy great John Murphy, and grandfather of Carlton's Marc Murphy; the trio was the first father-son-grandson combination in VFL/AFL history to have each played 100 games.

Murphy was a defender and played originally on the half back flank and the back pocket before moving to fullback. He won Hawthorn's 'Best and Fairest' award in 1936 and 1937, the first player from the club to go back to back.

== Honours and achievements ==
Individual

- 2× Hawthorn best and fairest: 1936, 1937
- Hawthorn life member
