= Bob Sellers (footballer) =

Australian rules footballer (1905–1971)

- Sellers in May 1925

Personal information
- Full name: Miles Alfred Sellers
- Born: 23 February 1905; St Kilda, Victoria
- Died: 10 September 1971 (aged 66); Fitzroy, Victoria
- Original team: Box Hill
- Debut: Round 1, 1925, Hawthorn vs. Richmond, at Glenferrie Oval
- Height: 182 cm (6 ft 0 in)
- Weight: 83 kg (183 lb)
- Positions: Follower, forward

Playing career^{1}
Years	Club	Games (Goals)	
1925–1934	Hawthorn	98 (65)	

Umpiring career
Years	League	Role	Games
1944–1952	VFL	Goal umpire	131
- ^{1} Playing statistics correct to the end of 1934.

Career highlights
- Hawthorn best all rounder: 1928; Hawthorn Hall of Fame

Miles Alfred "Bob" Sellers (23 February 1905 – 10 September 1971) was an Australian rules footballer who played with Hawthorn in the Victorian Football League (VFL).

== Early life ==
The eldest child of Alfred Thomas Sellers (1875–1923) and Florence Sellers (1878–1962), nee Pearce, Miles Alfred Sellers was born at St Kilda on 23 February 1905.

== Football ==
After commencing his football career with Ferntree Gully he joined Box Hill for a season before playing with Hawthorn from their inaugural VFL season in 1925 until 1934, as a follower and forward. He made a total of 98 league appearances.

Sellers also played district cricket for the Hawthorn-East Melbourne club.

In 1944 Sellers returned to the VFL as a goal umpire and officiated in 131 games. Until Mark Fraser's umpiring debut in 2005, Sellers was the last former player to officiate in a league fixture.

Miles Sellers remained an active member of the Hawthorn Football Club throughout his life, receiving a Life Membership and remaining timekeeper for the club until his death.

== Honours and achievements ==
Individual

- Hawthorn best all rounder: 1928
- Hawthorn Hall of Fame

== Death ==
Miles Sellers died after an illness at St Vincent's Hospital in Fitzroy on 10 September 1971 and was cremated at Springvale Botanical Cemetery.
