= Les Carbarns =

Australian rules footballer (1891–1970)

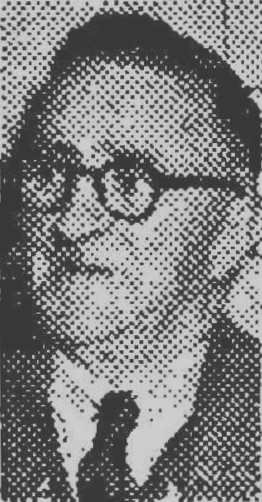

Personal information
- Full name: Leslie John Patience Carbarns
- Born: 1 April 1891; Tungamah, Victoria
- Died: 3 May 1970 (aged 79); Malvern, Victoria
- Original team: South Yarra
- Height: 180 cm (5 ft 11 in)
- Weight: 74 kg (163 lb)

Playing career^{1}
Years	Club	Games (Goals)
1920–1921	St Kilda	19 (1)
1922–1924	Hawthorn (VFA)	
1925	Hawthorn	12 (2)
Total		31 (3)
- ^{1} Playing statistics correct to the end of 1925.

Leslie John Patience Carbarns (1 April 1891 – 3 May 1970) was an Australian rules footballer who played with St Kilda and Hawthorn in the Victorian Football League (VFL).

== Early life ==
The son of Thomas Carbarns (1855–1909) and Fanny Carbarns (1855–1925), née Emery, Leslie John Patience Carbarns was born at Tungamah on 1 April 1891.

He was educated at Scotch College, Melbourne where he played football for the first XVIII and then played football with South Yarra in the Metropolitan League from 1912 to 1914.

In 1920, Carbarns married Elizabeth Mary Crawford (1887–1951).

== World War I ==
Carbarns enlisted to serve in World War I in 1915 and he served in Egypt, Gallipoli and Palestine with the 10th Reinforcements from 1915 to 1919.

== Football ==
=== St Kilda ===
Upon his return from war, Carbarns played for two seasons with St Kilda where he played a total of 19 games.

=== Hawthorn ===
In 1922 Carbarns transferred to Hawthorn (then in the Victorian Football Association). He played for Hawthorn for four years, including the 1925 VFL season, their first in the VFL competition.

== Later life ==
After his VFL career Carbarns worked as a sales agent and lived in the eastern suburbs of Melbourne. He also worked as a journalist for the Sporting Globe and served in numerous football and cricket administration roles.

Les Carbarns died at Malvern on 3 May 1970 and is buried in Springvale Botanical Cemetery.
