= Syd James =

Australian rules footballer

- Born: Sydney Victor Austin James; 26 October 1895; Glanville, South Australia
- Died: 3 August 1966 (aged 70); Canterbury, Victoria
Australian rules football career
Personal information
- Height: 183 cm (6 ft 0 in)
- Weight: 78 kg (172 lb)
Playing career^{1}
Years	Club	Games (Goals)
1921	Glenelg (SANFL)	9 (1)
1922	West Torrens (SANFL)	
1923	South Melbourne	8 (3)
1924	Cananore (TFL)	
1925	Hawthorn	2 (0)
Total		19 (4)
- ^{1} Playing statistics correct to the end of 1925.
- Cricket career

Cricket information
- Batting: Right-handed
- Bowling: Right-arm fast-medium
- Role: Bowler

Domestic team information
- Years: Team
- 1924/25: Tasmania
- Only FC: 30 January 1925 Tasmania v MCC

Career statistics
Competition	First-class
Matches	2
Runs scored	6
Batting average	3.00
100s/50s	0/0
Top score	4
Balls bowled	128
Wickets	0
Bowling average	–
5 wickets in innings	–
10 wickets in match	–
Best bowling	–
Catches/stumpings	1/–
- Source: CricketArchive, 7 August 2025

Sydney Victor Austin James (26 October 1895 – 3 August 1966) was an Australian rules footballer who played with South Melbourne and Hawthorn in the Victorian Football League (VFL).

== Family ==
The eldest son of Thomas William James and Rachel James, née Hall, Sydney Victor Austin James was born in Glanville, South Australia on 26 October 1895.

Sydney James married Emily Eugenia Hodgson on 26 Jan 1924 at Holder Memorial Methodist Church, Mile End.

== Football ==
James commenced his football career playing in Adelaide with the Glenelg Football Club before transferring to West Torrens.

In 1923 he moved to Victoria and made his debut for South Melbourne in Round 1 of the 1923 VFL season. After an injury affected season in which he made eight appearances, James accepted an offer to coach the Cananore Football Club in Tasmania in 1924.

In 1925 James returned to Victoria and played with Hawthorn in their first season of VFL football. He made only two appearances before transferring to VFA side Prahran in the middle of the season. He played in Rounds 9 and 10 but was then dropped and never played another senior game.

== Cricket ==
James played one first-class cricket match for Tasmania against the touring English side in 1924/25.
