= Ern Utting =

Australian rules footballer (1897–1948)

- Utting in May 1925

Personal information
- Full name: Ernest Benjamin Utting
- Born: 31 October 1897; Collingwood, Victoria, Australia
- Died: 21 November 1948 (aged 51); Hawthorn, Victoria, Australia
- Original team: Collingwood District
- Height: 166 cm (5 ft 5 in)
- Weight: 73 kg (161 lb)

Playing career^{1}
Years	Club	Games (Goals)
1919–1922	Collingwood	16 (29)
1923–1924	Hawthorn (VFA)	24 (16)
1925–1932	Hawthorn	101 (28)
Total		141 (73)
- ^{1} Playing statistics correct to the end of 1932.

Career highlights
- 2× Hawthorn best and fairest: 1927, 1929; Collingwood leading goalkicker: 1920; Hawthorn Hall of Fame

Ernest Benjamin 'Tich' Utting (31 October 1897 – 21 November 1948) was an Australian rules footballer who played for the Collingwood Football Club and Hawthorn Football Club in the Victorian Football League (VFL).

== Family ==
The tenth of thirteen children born to Thomas Edward Utting (1862–1942) and Emily Esther Utting (1863–1943), nee Bartley, Ernest Benjamin Utting was born at Collingwood on 31 October 1897.

== War service ==
In 1915, shortly before turning 18, Utting enlisted to serve in World War I. After completing training at Broadmeadows and then serving for five months overseas, Utting was returned to Australia from Egypt after he was diagnosed with a heart condition.

== Football ==
Ern Utting started his football career with the Collingwood District in the Victorian Junior Football League. Success as a forward in that team led to his selection by the Collingwood VFL (senior) team but he struggled to get consistent game time in what was a strong side, although he managed to top their goalkicking in 1920 with 23 goals. After four years with Collingwood he left the club and joined Hawthorn who were then in the Victorian Football Association (VFA).

Utting played for two seasons with Hawthorn in the VFA and was a member of Hawthorn's inaugural VFL side when they joined that competition in 1925. The Club Champion in 1927 and 1929, Utting was also the first Hawthorn footballer to play 100 VFL games. Playing mainly in the back pocket, he polled well in the Brownlow Medal during his career and finished in the top 10 on three occasions. He left the senior side at the end of 1932 but captained the seconds side in 1933, winning the Gardiner Medal for the reserve league's best and fairest player.

== Death ==
Utting died suddenly at his home in Hawthorn in 1948 and is buried at the Melbourne General Cemetery.

== Honours and achievements ==
Individual

- 2× Hawthorn best and fairest: 1927, 1929
- Collingwood leading goalkicker: 1920
- Hawthorn Hall of Fame
- Hawthorn life member
