= Kevin Coghlan (footballer) =

Australian rules footballer

Personal information
- Full name: Kevin Coghlan
- Born: 14 October 1929
- Died: 22 August 2002 (aged 72)
- Original team: CBC Parade / Clifton Hill CYMS (CYMSFA)
- Height: 163 cm (5 ft 4 in)
- Weight: 56 kg (123 lb)

Playing career^{1}
Years	Club	Games (Goals)
1949–1952	Collingwood	31 (25)
1953–1956	Hawthorn	59 (95)
Total		90 (120)
- ^{1} Playing statistics correct to the end of 1956.

Kevin "Skeeter" Coghlan (14 October 1929 – 22 August 2002) was an Australian rules footballer who played with Collingwood and Hawthorn in the Victorian Football League (VFL).

Coghlan, said to have been the smallest player of his era, earned his nickname of "Skeeter" when during a junior high jump competition he successfully made it over a target which was three inches above his height. Not surprisingly, Coghlan played his football as a rover. He won a Gardiner Medal in 1949 for his efforts in the league seconds.

He took a while he establish himself in the Collingwood senior side, with just four appearances from his first two seasons. Over the next two years however he played 27 games. Collingwood went on to win the premiership in 1953, but Coghlan was at Hawthorn, having applied for and been granted a clearance to the Hawks.

Coghlan was the leading goal-kicker for Hawthorn in three successive seasons from 1953 to 1955. His tally of 19 goals in 1953 remains the lowest ever total to top the Hawthorn goal-kicking.

After retiring, Coghlan worked as a football journalist. He was a teacher of senior school maths and physics at Melbourne Girls Grammar school and taught at Melbourne High School and at Northcote High School. He was also a television and radio football commentator.
