= Stan Spinks =

Australian rules footballer

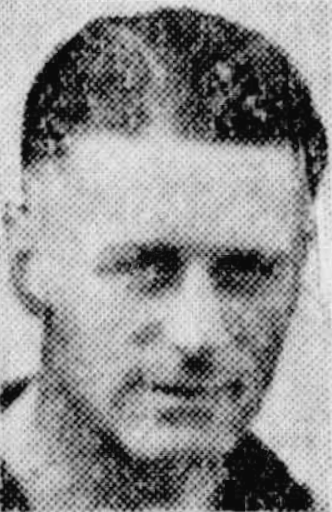

Personal information
- Full name: Stanley James Spinks
- Born: 16 October 1912; Hawthorn, Victoria
- Died: 23 October 2003 (aged 91); Broadbeach, Queensland
- Original team: Auburn
- Height: 171 cm (5 ft 7 in)
- Weight: 79 kg (174 lb)

Playing career^{1}
Years	Club	Games (Goals)
1931–1941	Hawthorn	143 (19)
- ^{1} Playing statistics correct to the end of 1941.

Career highlights
- 2× Hawthorn best and fairest: 1932, 1938; Hawthorn Hall of Fame

Stanley James Spinks (16 October 1912 – 23 October 2003) was an Australian rules footballer who played for the Hawthorn Football Club in the Victorian Football League (VFL) during the 1930s. He played as both a centreman and wingman in his career.

Stan's father, Charles Spinks was a founder of the Hawthorn Football club in 1902.

Spinks finished second in the 1938 Brownlow Medal count, missing out by one vote to Dick Reynolds. He did, however, win that season's Hawthorn best and fairest, having won the award previously in 1932. In 1941 he quit the club after being dropped to the reserves side. He finished his playing career with Camberwell in the Victorian Football Association, but later returned to Hawthorn as coach of their thirds team in 1946. He also became an active committeeman (1947-1951-55) and he served as a club selector for more than a decade.

In 2007, Stan Spinks was inducted into the Hawthorn Hall of Fame.

== Honours and achievements ==
Individual

- 2× Hawthorn best and fairest: 1932, 1938
- Hawthorn Hall of Fame
- Hawthorn life member
