= Jim Jackson (Australian rules footballer) =

Australian rules footballer & coach (1890–1976)

- Jackson in May 1925

Personal information
- Full name: James Jackson
- Born: 28 April 1890; Maidstone, Victoria
- Died: 29 August 1976 (aged 86); Hawthorn, Victoria
- Original team: St Kilda
- Debut: Round 2, 1909, St Kilda vs. Collingwood, at Junction Oval
- Height: 174 cm (5 ft 9 in)
- Weight: 73 kg (161 lb)
- Position: Wing

Playing career^{1}
Years	Club	Games (Goals)
1909	St Kilda (VFL)	1 (0)
1910–1915, 1920	Collingwood (VFL)	93 (22)
1921–1924	Hawthorn (VFA)	53 (3)
1925–1926	Hawthorn (VFL)	22 (1)

Coaching career
Years	Club	Games (W–L–D)
1932	Hawthorn	18 (3–15–0)
- ^{1} Playing statistics correct to the end of 1926.

James Jackson (28 April 1890 – 29 August 1976) was an Australian rules footballer who played with the St Kilda Football Club and the Collingwood Football Club in the Victorian Football League (VFL), and with the Hawthorn Football Club in both the Victorian Football Association (VFA) and the VFL.

== Family ==
The son of Thomas Charles Jackson (1856–1943), and Martha Anne Jackson (1861–1933), Jim Jackson was born at Maidstone in the north-west of Melbourne on 28 April 1890.

== Football ==
For most of his career spanning 14 seasons over 17 years, Jackson played on the wing; however, at the end of his career, at Hawthorn, he played at full-back.

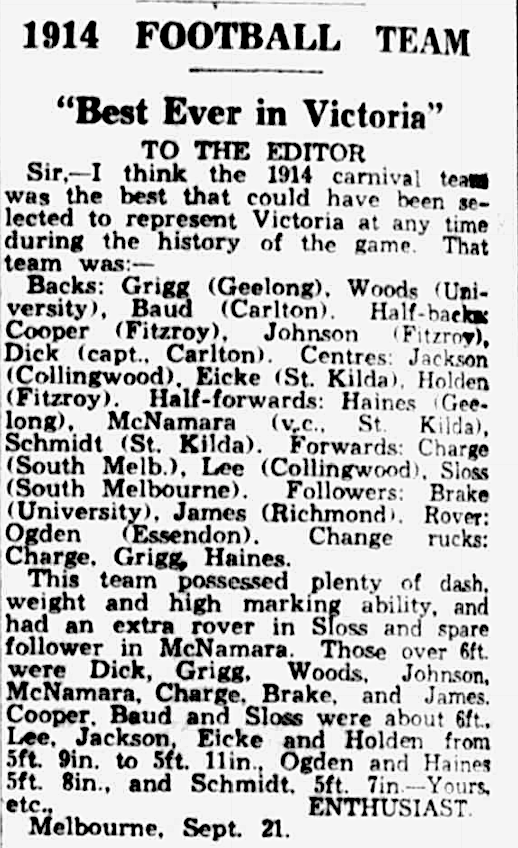
Enthusiast's Letter to the Editor The Herald, 21 September 1934.

=== St Kilda (VFL) ===
Promoted from the St Kilda "Juniors", he only played in one match for St Kilda: against Collingwood, at the Junction Oval, on 8 May 1909.

=== Collingwood (VFL) ===
He crossed to Collingwood in 1910, and went on to play in 93 games over 7 seasons (1910 to 1915, 1920). He was injured, and did not play in the 1915 VFL Grand Final against Carlton; and his war service prevented him from playing in Collingwood's 1917 Premiership and its 1919 Premiership.

==== Representative football ====
He represented the VFL in the match against South Australia in Adelaide on 12 July 1913; and at the 1914 ANFC Carnival in Sydney.

Whilst at the 1914 Carnival, and having beaten University's ruckman, Jack Brake, in a play-off, he represented Victoria in a goal-kicking competition held among the Australian rules footballers at the Carnival, to choose one player to compete against H.H. "Dally" Messenger the champion Eastern Suburbs Rugby League footballer. The competition, held on 8 August 1914, between Walter Abotomey (New South Wales), Jack Ashley (South Australia), F. Burton (Tasmania), Herb Limb (West Australia), and Jim Jackson (Victoria), was won by Herb Limb. On the following Saturday, 15 August 1914, Messenger defeated Limb.

=== Hawthorn (VFA) ===
On 4 May 1921, having initially retired from football, Jackson was cleared to Hawthorn (then in the VFA), and went on to play in 53 games (3 goals) over four seasons (1921 to 1924).

=== Hawthorn (VFL) ===
Hawthorn joined the VFL in 1925, and he was appointed its inaugural VFL captain.

==== Coach ====
In 1932 Jackson returned to Hawthorn as their non-playing coach. The team, with only three wins, took the wooden spoon for 1932.

== Military service ==
He enlisted in the First AIF on 16 July 1915. He served overseas, and returned to Australia on 22 May 1919.

== Death ==
He died at Hawthorn, Victoria on 29 August 1976.

== See also ==
- 1914 Sydney Carnival
