= Jack Ryan (footballer, born 1907) =

Australian rules footballer, born 1907

Personal information
- Full name: John Leo Ryan
- Born: 24 July 1907; Kerang, Victoria
- Died: 4 July 1959 (aged 51); Malvern East, Victoria
- Original team: Carnegie
- Height: 165 cm (5 ft 5 in)
- Weight: 67 kg (148 lb)
- Position: Rover

Playing career^{1}
Years	Club	Games (Goals)
1929–1933	Hawthorn	70 (142)
- ^{1} Playing statistics correct to the end of 1933.

John Leo Ryan (24 July 1907 – 4 July 1959) was an Australian rules footballer who played with Hawthorn in the Victorian Football League (VFL).

Originally from Carnegie, Ryan played his football at Hawthorn as a rover.

He was Hawthorn's leading goal-kicker in 1931 and 1932, with 39 and 37 goals respectively.

In 1936 he accepted the role of Captain Coach of the Bendigo CYMS team in the Bendigo Football Association. In 1937 he accepted the role of Captain Coach of the Warrnambool team in the Hampden Football League.
