= Arthur Pearson (footballer) =

Australian rules footballer

- Pearson in May 1925

Personal information
- Full name: Arthur Pearson
- Born: 11 February 1896; Hawthorn, Victoria
- Died: 11 February 1963 (aged 67); Jordanville, Victoria
- Original team: Hawthorn Juniors
- Debut: Round 1, 1925, Hawthorn vs. Richmond, at Glenferrie Oval
- Height: 184 cm (6 ft 0 in)
- Weight: 83 kg (183 lb)
- Position: Centre half-back

Playing career^{1}
Years	Club	Games (Goals)
1922–1924	Hawthorn (VFA)	46 (54)
1925	Hawthorn	6 (2)
- ^{1} Playing statistics correct to the end of 1925.

Arthur Pearson (11 February 1896 – 11 February 1963) was an Australian rules footballer who played with Hawthorn in the Victorian Football League (VFL).

== Early life ==
Born and raised in Hawthorn, Arthur Pearson was the youngest of the seven boys born to Nathaniel Knight Pearson (1860–1920) and Jane Pearson (1858–1934), née Malcolm.

== Football ==
Pearson commenced his career with Hawthorn Juniors and joined Hawthorn for the 1922 season, playing almost every game over the next three years. He stayed with the club when they entered the VFL in 1925 and played six matches, including being one of the better players in Hawthorn's first ever VFL match. He retired at the end of the 1925 VFL season.

== Later life ==
Arthur Pearson never married and worked as an engineer after his football career.

Pearson died on 11 February 1963 and is buried with his mother and brother at Burwood Cemetery.
