= Hec Yeomans =

Australian rules footballer (1895–1968)

- Yeomans in May 1925

Personal information
- Full name: Hector Richard Yeomans
- Born: 17 February 1895; Albert Park, Victoria
- Died: 11 September 1968 (aged 73); Parkville, Victoria
- Height: 173 cm (5 ft 8 in)
- Weight: 70 kg (154 lb)
- Position: Forward

Playing career^{1}
Years	Club	Games (Goals)
1920	St Kilda	5 (8)
1921–1924	Hawthorn (VFA)	72 (99)
1925	Hawthorn	15 (16)
Total		92 (123)
- ^{1} Playing statistics correct to the end of 1925.

Hector Richard "Hec" Yeomans, MM (17 February 1895 – 11 September 1968) was an Australian rules footballer who played with St Kilda and Hawthorn in the Victorian Football League (VFL).

== Early life ==
Yeomans was born in Albert Park, Melbourne, in 1895, the only child of Richard Eli Yeomans and Norah Teresa Cameron.

== War service ==
Yeomans enlisted to fight in World War I in January 1916 and fought in France, receiving the Military Medal for his actions in the Battle of Mont Saint-Quentin in September 1918.

== Football ==
Yeomans played two senior games for St Kilda in the 1920 VFL season before leaving to join Hawthorn, then in the Victorian Football Association.

He was an immediate success at Hawthorn, establishing himself as one of the leading rovers in the Victorian Football Association at that time. He continued to play for Hawthorn when they joined the VFL in 1925 and was their second highest goal-kicker for the year.

After two years as captain coach of the Tooronga junior side, Yeomans joined Brunswick for the 1928 VFA season, but played only a handful of games.

== Death ==
Hec Yeomans died in 1968 and is buried at Melbourne General Cemetery.
