= Bert Hyde =

Australian rules footballer (1907–1989)

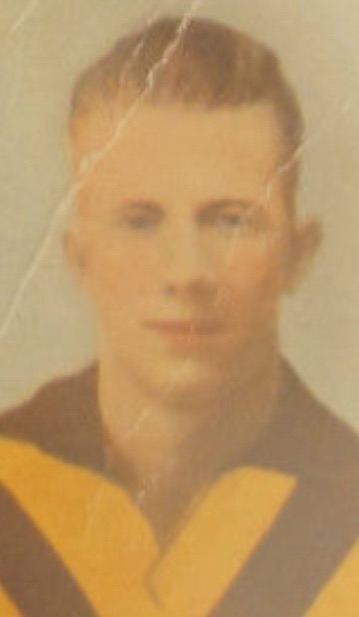
- Hyde's football card

Personal information
- Full name: Albert Victor Hyde
- Born: 3 June 1907; Brunswick East, Victoria, Australia
- Died: 23 October 1989 (aged 82); Rosebud, Victoria, AUstralia
- Original team: South Brunswick / Monbulk
- Height: 180 cm (5 ft 11 in)
- Weight: 81 kg (179 lb)

Playing career^{1}
| Years | Club | Games (Goals) |
| 1924 | Brunswick (VFA) | 10 (5) |
| 1925–1935 | Hawthorn | 129 (269) |
| 1936–1937 | Preston (VFA) | 27 (34) |
| Total | | 166 (308) |
- ^{1} Playing statistics correct to the end of 1937.

Career highlights
- 5× Hawthorn leading goalkicker: 1926–1930; Recorder Cup: 1936; Hawthorn Hall of Fame

Albert Victor Hyde (3 June 1907 – 23 October 1989) was an Australian rules footballer who played with Hawthorn Football Club in the VFL.

== Football ==
=== Brunswick (VFA) ===
Recruited from East Brunswick, he played in ten First XVII matches (scoring 5 goals) with Brunswick Football Club in 1924.

=== Hawthorn (VFL) ===
Hyde was a full-forward and was Hawthorn's major goal-kicker during their first decade in the VFL: he topped their goal-kicking from 1926–1930, with a best of 62 goals in 1928 to finish third in the VFL's goal-kicking — an especially impressive feat considering that Hawthorn finished last without a win. His last couple of seasons at Hawrthorn were spent at full-back.

=== Victoria (VFL) ===
He is the only player to have been selected to represent the VFL at both full-forward (1928) and at full-back (1933).

=== Preston (VFA) ===
Hyde became captain-coach of Preston Football Club on 21 December 1935; and, during his first season at Preston (1936), he was joint winner of the Recorder Cup. He retired at the end of 1937.

== Athlete ==
Running as the favourite, he came second (by a foot) to R. L. Barker in the 1932 Stawell Gift final.

== After football ==
After the war, Hyde served for many years on the committee at Hawthorn.

Later, Hyde was a businessman in Melbourne. In 1965, he was appointed President of the Metropolitan Football League.

== Death ==
He died on 23 October 1989.

== See also ==
• 1933 Sydney Carnival

== Honours and achievements ==
Individual

- 5× Hawthorn leading goalkicker: 1926, 1927, 1928, 1929, 1930
- Recorder Cup: 1936
- Hawthorn Hall of Fame
- Hawthorn life member
