= Peter Crimmins Medal =

Best and fairest award for Hawthorn Football Club

The Peter Crimmins Medal is an Australian rules football award given to the player(s) from the Hawthorn Football Club deemed best and fairest for the season. Peter Crimmins was a rover for Hawthorn, playing from 1966 to 1975. He died of cancer just days after the club's 1976 premiership win.

The voting system, as of the 2022 AFL season, consists of six coaches and assistants awarding votes after each match; players can receive a maximum of 12 votes per game.

== Recipients ==
^	Denotes current player
+	Player won Brownlow Medal in the same season

Season	Winner	Ref.
1925	Fred Finch	
1926	—N/a	
1927	Ern Utting	
1928	Miles Sellers	
1929	Ern Utting (2)	
1930	Jack Sharpley	
1931	—N/a	
1932	Stan Spinks	
1933	Bert Mills	
1934	Ernie Loveless	
1935	Bert Mills (2)	
1936	Leo Murphy	
1937	Leo Murphy (2)	
1938	Stan Spinks (2)	
1939	Bert Mills (3)	
1940	Andy Angwin	
1941	Alec Albiston	
1942	Jack Barker	
1943	Jim Bohan	
1944	Jack Blackman	
1945	Jim Bohan (2)	
1946	Alec Albiston (2)	
1947	Wally Culpitt	
1948	Kevin Curran	
1949	Col Austen+	
1950	John Kennedy Sr.	
1951	John Kennedy Sr. (2)	
1952	John Kennedy Sr. (3)	
1953	Ted Fletcher	
1954	John Kennedy Sr. (4)	
1955	Graham Arthur	
1956	Roy Simmonds	
1957	Alf Hughes	
1958	Graham Arthur (2)	
1959	Allan Woodley	
1960	Brendan Edwards	
1961	Ian Law	
1962	Graham Arthur (3)	
1963	Ian Law (2)	
1964	Ian Law (3)	
1965	David Parkin	
1966	Ray Wilson	
1967	Bob Keddie	
1968	Peter Hudson	
1969	Bob Keddie (2)	
1970	Peter Hudson (2)	
1971	Leigh Matthews	
1972	Leigh Matthews (2)	
1973	Don Scott	
1974	Leigh Matthews (3)	
1975	Peter Knights	
1976	Leigh Matthews (4)	
1977	Leigh Matthews (5)	
1978	Peter Knights (2)	
1978	Leigh Matthews (6)	
1979	Kelvin Moore	
1980	Leigh Matthews (7)	
1981	Terry Wallace	
1982	Leigh Matthews (8)	
1983	Terry Wallace (2)	
1984	Russell Greene	
1985	Dermott Brereton	
1986	Gary Ayres	
1987	John Platten+	
1988	Jason Dunstall	
1989	Jason Dunstall (2)	
1990	Andrew Collins	
1991	Ben Allan	
1992	Jason Dunstall (3)	
1993	Jason Dunstall (4)	
1994	John Platten (2)	
1995	Darren Jarman	
1996	Paul Salmon	
1997	Paul Salmon (2)	
1998	Shane Crawford	
1999	Shane Crawford+ (2)	
2000	Daniel Chick	
2000	Nick Holland	
2001	Joel Smith	
2002	Shane Crawford (3)	
2003	Shane Crawford (4)	
2004	Peter Everitt	
2005	Luke Hodge	
2006	Sam Mitchell	
2007	Brad Sewell	
2008	Lance Franklin	
2009	Sam Mitchell (2)	
2010	Luke Hodge (2)	
2011	Sam Mitchell (3)	
2012	Sam Mitchell+ (4)	
2013	Josh Gibson	
2014	Jordan Lewis	
2015	Josh Gibson (2)	
2016	Sam Mitchell (5)	
2017	Tom Mitchell	
2018	Tom Mitchell+ (2)	
2019	James Worpel	
2020	Jack Gunston^	
2021	Tom Mitchell (3)	
2022	James Sicily^	
2023	Will Day^	
2024	Jai Newcombe^	
2025	Jack Gunston^ (2)	
2026	Nick Watson^	

== Multiple winners ==
Player	Total wins	Seasons
Leigh Matthews	8	1971, 1972, 1974, 1976, 1977, 1978, 1980, 1982
Sam Mitchell	5	2006, 2009, 2011, 2012, 2016
Shane Crawford	4	1998, 1999, 2002, 2003
Jason Dunstall	4	1988, 1989, 1992, 1993
John Kennedy Sr.	4	1950, 1951, 1952, 1954
Graham Arthur	3	1955, 1958, 1962
Ian Law	3	1961, 1963, 1964
Bert Mills	3	1933, 1935, 1939
Tom Mitchell	3	2017, 2018, 2021
Alec Albiston	2	1941, 1946
Jim Bohan	2	1943, 1945
Josh Gibson	2	2013, 2015
Jack Gunston^	2	2020, 2025
Luke Hodge	2	2005, 2010
Peter Hudson	2	1968, 1970
Bob Keddie	2	1967, 1969
Peter Knights	2	1975, 1978
Leo Murphy	2	1936, 1937
John Platten	2	1987, 1994
Paul Salmon	2	1996, 1997
Stan Spinks	2	1932, 1938
Ern Utting	2	1927, 1929
Terry Wallace	2	1981, 1983
