= List of Carlton Football Club players =

This is a list of Carlton Football Club players who have made one or more appearance in the Australian Football League (AFL), known as the Victorian Football League (VFL) until 1990. Carlton was one of the foundation clubs for the inaugural VFL season in 1897.

== VFL/AFL players ==
Key
| Order | Players are listed in order of debut |
| Seasons | Includes Carlton only careers and spans from the season of the player's debut to the year in which they played their final game for Carlton |
| Debut | Debuts are for VFL/AFL regular season and finals series matches only |
| Games | Statistics are for VFL/AFL regular season and finals series matches only and are correct to the end of the 2026 season. |
| Goals | Statistics are for VFL/AFL regular season and finals series matches only and are correct to the end of the 2026 season. |
| ^{^} | Currently listed players |

=== 1890s ===
| Debut Year | Player | Games | Goals | Years at Club |
|---|---|---|---|---|
| 1897 | Bill Ahern | 1 | 0 | 1897 |
| 1897 | Jimmy Aitken | 15 | 3 | 1897–1898 |
| 1897 | Bob Armstrong | 12 | 0 | 1897–1898 |
| 1897 | Tom Blake | 4 | 0 | 1897 |
| 1897 | Otto Buck | 3 | 0 | 1897 |
| 1897 | Bob Cameron | 11 | 1 | 1897 |
| 1897 | Bill Casey | 61 | 2 | 1897–1900 |
| 1897 | Arthur Cummins | 7 | 1 | 1897 |
| 1897 | Henry Dunne | 24 | 6 | 1897–1898 |
| 1897 | Brook Hannah | 14 | 0 | 1897 |
| 1897 | Ted Heffernan | 2 | 0 | 1897 |
| 1897 | George Johnston | 1 | 0 | 1897 |
| 1897 | Henry McPetrie | 5 | 2 | 1897 |
| 1897 | Wally O'Cock | 41 | 25 | 1897–1899, 1901 |
| 1897 | Joe Paton | 5 | 0 | 1897 |
| 1897 | Jack Reekie | 27 | 0 | 1897–1898 |
| 1897 | Tom Sweetman | 30 | 3 | 1897–1899 |
| 1897 | Ernie Walton | 120 | 8 | 1897–1904 |
| 1897 | Bill Weir | 16 | 1 | 1897–1898 |
| 1897 | Bill Woodhouse | 10 | 1 | 1897 |
| 1897 | Sam Chapman | 25 | 17 | 1897–1898 |
| 1897 | Harry Gyles | 1 | 0 | 1897 |
| 1897 | Harry Howard | 2 | 0 | 1897 |
| 1897 | Alby Paterson | 1 | 0 | 1897 |
| 1897 | Peter Williams | 34 | 1 | 1897–1899, 1901 |
| 1897 | Chic Breese | 24 | 10 | 1897–1898 |
| 1897 | Jim Caffery | 7 | 4 | 1897 |
| 1897 | Jim Lyons | 11 | 0 | 1897–1898 |
| 1897 | Harry H. Morgan | 11 | 0 | 1897 |
| 1897 | Bobby Walsh | 78 | 21 | 1897–1902 |
| 1897 | Henry Crane | 8 | 0 | 1897 |
| 1897 | Jack Frost | 4 | 0 | 1897 |
| 1897 | Jack Roberts | 24 | 2 | 1897–1899 |
| 1897 | Oscar Manchester | 14 | 3 | 1897–1898 |
| 1897 | Bill Patterson | 5 | 0 | 1897–1898 |
| 1897 | Sam Reid | 3 | 0 | 1897 |
| 1897 | Herbie Lowenthal | 1 | 0 | 1897 |
| 1897 | Jim H. Goonan | 2 | 0 | 1897 |
| 1897 | Billy Arnott | 1 | 0 | 1897 |
| 1898 | Fred Barlow | 1 | 0 | 1898 |
| 1898 | Charlie Brown | 12 | 1 | 1898 |
| 1898 | Len Morrison | 56 | 7 | 1898–1902 |
| 1898 | Tommy O'Day | 13 | 8 | 1898 |
| 1898 | Jim Pender | 15 | 4 | 1898 |
| 1898 | Bill Sharkey | 47 | 0 | 1898–1901 |
| 1898 | George Warde | 17 | 2 | 1898 |
| 1898 | Charlie Curtis | 21 | 2 | 1898–1900 |
| 1898 | Mick Pender | 1 | 0 | 1898 |
| 1898 | Des Meadowcroft | 2 | 0 | 1898 |
| 1898 | Dan Pender | 4 | 0 | 1898 |
| 1898 | Tommy Kinman | 1 | 1 | 1898 |
| 1898 | Jim Coucher | 5 | 0 | 1898 |
| 1898 | Alf Moore | 2 | 0 | 1898 |
| 1898 | Herman Dohrmann | 12 | 2 | 1898–1899 |
| 1898 | Mick Donaghy | 10 | 0 | 1898 |
| 1898 | Bill Churchyard | 10 | 4 | 1898–1899 |
| 1898 | George Young | 15 | 1 | 1898–1899 |
| 1898 | Dick Stewart | 6 | 0 | 1898, 1900 |
| 1898 | Les Vernon | 3 | 1 | 1898 |
| 1898 | Jim Balharry | 1 | 0 | 1898 |
| 1898 | Pat Considine | 48 | 12 | 1898–1901 |
| 1898 | Jack Douglas | 1 | 0 | 1898 |
| 1899 | Henry Allender | 1 | 0 | 1899 |
| 1899 | Joe Archer | 4 | 0 | 1899 |
| 1899 | George Cowell | 7 | 4 | 1899 |
| 1899 | Alf Hearnden | 3 | 0 | 1899 |
| 1899 | Bobadil Hooper | 14 | 0 | 1899 |
| 1899 | Bill McNamara | 69 | 8 | 1899–1904 |
| 1899 | Henry McShane | 82 | 28 | 1899–1904 |
| 1899 | Billy Monagle | 17 | 0 | 1899 |
| 1899 | Will Stuckey | 28 | 1 | 1899–1900 |
| 1899 | Bob Bird | 20 | 3 | 1899–1900 |
| 1899 | Denis Lanigan | 14 | 2 | 1899 |
| 1899 | Arthur Thompson | 22 | 2 | 1899–1901 |
| 1899 | Dick Walker | 11 | 7 | 1899 |
| 1899 | Artie McSpeerin | 2 | 2 | 1899 |
| 1899 | Harry Lewis | 4 | 2 | 1899 |
| 1899 | Dick Gorsuch | 1 | 0 | 1899 |
| 1899 | Bill Collins | 10 | 2 | 1899–1900 |
| 1899 | Harry Thompson | 6 | 8 | 1899 |
| 1899 | Harry Evans | 8 | 2 | 1899, 1901 |
| 1899 | Jack Gilbert | 9 | 3 | 1899–1900 |
| 1899 | Victor Rapp | 1 | 0 | 1899 |

=== 1900s ===
| Debut Year | Player | Games | Goals | Years at Club |
|---|---|---|---|---|
| 1900 | Fred Elliott | 197 | 86 | 1900–1901, 1903–1911 |
| 1900 | Bill Lewis | 15 | 9 | 1900 |
| 1900 | Gerald O'Dwyer | 16 | 0 | 1900 |
| 1900 | Wally Powell | 28 | 0 | 1900, 1902 |
| 1900 | Harry Rigby | 29 | 2 | 1900–1902 |
| 1900 | Charlie Roland | 100 | 24 | 1900–1905, 1908 |
| 1900 | Joe Sullivan | 54 | 63 | 1900–1903 |
| 1900 | Peter Campbell | 3 | 1 | 1900 |
| 1900 | Joe Marr | 27 | 6 | 1900–1902 |
| 1900 | Bill Strickland | 1 | 0 | 1900 |
| 1900 | Charlie Ross | 41 | 8 | 1900–1904 |
| 1900 | Charlie Oliver | 1 | 1 | 1900 |
| 1900 | Ned Bennett | 6 | 0 | 1900 |
| 1900 | Jim Matthews | 3 | 0 | 1900 |
| 1900 | Charlie Maplestone | 16 | 1 | 1900–1902 |
| 1901 | Harry Daniel | 11 | 0 | 1901 |
| 1901 | Dick Hart | 11 | 4 | 1901–1902 |
| 1901 | Jim Loriot | 4 | 0 | 1901 |
| 1901 | Paddy Noonan | 19 | 5 | 1901–1902 |
| 1901 | Bill Pettit | 15 | 0 | 1901 |
| 1901 | Harry Pye | 16 | 1 | 1901–1902 |
| 1901 | Charles Raff | 3 | 0 | 1901 |
| 1901 | Jack Gardiner | 16 | 5 | 1901–1902 |
| 1901 | Jimmy Robinson | 1 | 0 | 1901 |
| 1901 | Charlie Stewart | 3 | 1 | 1901 |
| 1901 | George Cornelius | 1 | 0 | 1901 |
| 1901 | Rhoda McDonald | 4 | 1 | 1901 |
| 1901 | Harry Powell | 8 | 0 | 1901–1902 |
| 1901 | Frank Gomez | 1 | 0 | 1901 |
| 1901 | Charlie Schunke | 1 | 0 | 1901 |
| 1901 | George McGann | 4 | 0 | 1901 |
| 1901 | Simon Roberts | 3 | 0 | 1901 |
| 1901 | Alex Barlow | 14 | 0 | 1901–1903 |
| 1901 | Frank Field | 13 | 1 | 1901–1902 |
| 1901 | Bill Dodds | 1 | 0 | 1901 |
| 1901 | Billy Spears | 1 | 0 | 1901 |
| 1901 | Jack Todd | 4 | 0 | 1901–1902 |
| 1902 | Henry Crisfield | 5 | 3 | 1902 |
| 1902 | Joe McShane | 48 | 17 | 1902–1904 |
| 1902 | Tom Watson | 14 | 0 | 1902 |
| 1902 | Jim McFarlane | 1 | 0 | 1902 |
| 1902 | Archie Snell | 92 | 56 | 1902–1907 |
| 1902 | George Wickens | 3 | 2 | 1902 |
| 1902 | Rob Dashwood | 3 | 0 | 1902 |
| 1902 | Tom Fox | 10 | 7 | 1902 |
| 1902 | Paddy Leahy | 4 | 0 | 1902 |
| 1902 | Charlie Tough | 25 | 2 | 1902–1905 |
| 1902 | Chris Ryan | 2 | 3 | 1902–1903 |
| 1902 | Fred Scott | 17 | 11 | 1902–1904 |
| 1902 | Gordon Ross | 30 | 0 | 1902–1903 |
| 1902 | Jim Opie | 27 | 3 | 1902–1903, 1905 |
| 1902 | Barney Lazarus | 7 | 0 | 1902 |
| 1902 | Jim Martin | 6 | 2 | 1902 |
| 1902 | Fred Webber | 23 | 26 | 1902–1904 |
| 1902 | Herb Hainsworth | 1 | 2 | 1902 |
| 1902 | George Topping | 125 | 153 | 1902–1910, 1912, 1914, 1916 |
| 1902 | Andy Dougall | 2 | 0 | 1902 |
| 1902 | Charlie O'Connor | 20 | 0 | 1902–1904 |
| 1902 | Wal McKenzie | 1 | 0 | 1902 |
| 1902 | Pat McNulty | 1 | 0 | 1902 |
| 1902 | Sam Stivey | 2 | 0 | 1902–1903 |
| 1903 | Jim Flynn | 77 | 9 | 1903–1908, 1910 |
| 1903 | Arthur Ford | 64 | 10 | 1903, 1908–1912 |
| 1903 | Bob Jacobson | 8 | 0 | 1903 |
| 1903 | Billy Leeds | 27 | 14 | 1903–1905 |
| 1903 | Albert Trim | 36 | 0 | 1903–1904 |
| 1903 | Mick Grace | 86 | 133 | 1903–1907 |
| 1903 | Billy Orr | 1 | 0 | 1903 |
| 1903 | George Bruce | 181 | 30 | 1903–1913 |
| 1903 | Frank Hince | 36 | 1 | 1903–1906 |
| 1903 | Matt Crowe | 5 | 6 | 1903–1904 |
| 1903 | Alf Gough | 1 | 0 | 1903 |
| 1903 | Norm Hogg | 3 | 2 | 1903–1904 |
| 1903 | Bert Lithgow | 9 | 3 | 1903–1904 |
| 1903 | Alex Prentice | 1 | 0 | 1903 |
| 1903 | Jim Marchbank | 115 | 43 | 1903–1904, 1906–1913 |
| 1903 | John T. Stephenson | 1 | 0 | 1903 |
| 1904 | Jim Cullen | 1 | 0 | 1904 |
| 1904 | Ted Kennedy | 106 | 13 | 1904–1909 |
| 1904 | Arthur Ryan | 4 | 0 | 1904 |
| 1904 | Harry Newbound | 18 | 2 | 1904–1905 |
| 1904 | Percy Pitt | 8 | 11 | 1904 |
| 1904 | Henry Whight | 7 | 0 | 1904 |
| 1904 | Rupe Bradley | 4 | 4 | 1904–1905 |
| 1904 | Bob Boyle | 36 | 0 | 1904–1906 |
| 1904 | Jimmy Gaynor | 1 | 0 | 1904 |
| 1904 | Pat Pelly | 8 | 0 | 1904 |
| 1904 | Sam Marron | 1 | 0 | 1904 |
| 1904 | Albert Gourlay | 3 | 0 | 1904 |
| 1904 | Eddie Prescott | 11 | 9 | 1904 |
| 1904 | Ernie Ashton | 1 | 0 | 1904 |
| 1904 | Billy Payne | 127 | 0 | 1904–1912 |
| 1905 | Charlie Hammond | 154 | 40 | 1905–1909, 1914–1918 |
| 1905 | George Johnson | 90 | 29 | 1905–1909 |
| 1905 | Jim Kennedy | 23 | 20 | 1905–1907 |
| 1905 | Bert Parke | 21 | 0 | 1905, 1913 |
| 1905 | Edgar Yeomans | 3 | 1 | 1905 |
| 1905 | Rod McGregor | 236 | 26 | 1905–1912, 1914–1920 |
| 1905 | Bill McVeigh | 5 | 3 | 1905 |
| 1905 | Alf Sharp | 5 | 0 | 1905 |
| 1905 | Les Abbott | 1 | 0 | 1905 |
| 1905 | George McCart | 1 | 0 | 1905 |
| 1905 | Jim Slater | 4 | 0 | 1905 |
| 1905 | George Blake | 1 | 0 | 1905 |
| 1905 | Frank Caine | 80 | 147 | 1905–1909 |
| 1905 | Fred Hewitt | 2 | 1 | 1905 |
| 1905 | Norm Clark | 126 | 3 | 1905–1912 |
| 1905 | Archie McNeel | 10 | 0 | 1905 |
| 1905 | Alby Ingleman | 21 | 2 | 1905–1908 |
| 1906 | Martin Gotz | 106 | 42 | 1906–1911, 1913 |
| 1906 | Bill Grant | 2 | 0 | 1906 |
| 1906 | Alex Lang | 105 | 82 | 1906–1910, 1916–1917 |
| 1906 | Doug Gillespie | 90 | 0 | 1906–1910, 1912 |
| 1906 | Alex Johnston | 6 | 0 | 1906 |
| 1906 | Dick Harris | 58 | 14 | 1906–1907, 1909–1911 |
| 1906 | Jack Grant | 1 | 1 | 1906 |
| 1906 | Jack Hammond | 2 | 1 | 1906 |
| 1906 | Les Beck | 60 | 3 | 1906–1909 |
| 1906 | Fred Jinks | 60 | 28 | 1906–1909 |
| 1906 | Andy Kennedy | 2 | 0 | 1906 |
| 1906 | Albert Bickford | 2 | 0 | 1906–1907 |
| 1906 | Harvey Gibson | 1 | 0 | 1906 |
| 1906 | Ike Little | 8 | 5 | 1906 |
| 1906 | William Harry | 1 | 0 | 1906 |
| 1906 | Charlie Meadway | 1 | 0 | 1906 |
| 1907 | Bill Hickey | 1 | 0 | 1907 |
| 1907 | Frank Williams | 10 | 0 | 1907–1908 |
| 1907 | Vin Gardiner | 157 | 341 | 1907–1917 |
| 1907 | Dave Gillespie | 5 | 2 | 1907–1908 |
| 1907 | Harvey Kelly | 43 | 75 | 1907–1909 |
| 1907 | Horrie Pearce | 2 | 1 | 1907 |
| 1907 | Alf Wheeler | 1 | 0 | 1907 |
| 1908 | Ernie Kelly | 8 | 11 | 1908 |
| 1908 | Wally Koochew | 4 | 2 | 1908 |
| 1908 | Bill Laver | 1 | 0 | 1908 |
| 1908 | Bill Carmody | 1 | 0 | 1908 |
| 1908 | Bill Marchbank | 3 | 2 | 1908 |
| 1908 | Andy Pattison | 8 | 1 | 1908–1909 |
| 1909 | Alex Barningham | 56 | 24 | 1909–1913, 1915 |
| 1909 | George Renwick | 4 | 0 | 1909 |
| 1909 | George Stewart | 2 | 0 | 1909 |
| 1909 | Jack Baquie | 42 | 20 | 1909–1910, 1912–1913 |
| 1909 | Jim Neylan | 3 | 0 | 1909–1910 |
| 1909 | Ernie Jamieson | 125 | 4 | 1909–1916, 1921–1922 |
| 1909 | Ray Ritchie | 1 | 0 | 1909 |

=== 1910s ===
| Debut Year | Player | Games | Goals | Years at Club |
|---|---|---|---|---|
| 1910 | Tom Clancy | 74 | 10 | 1910–1914 |
| 1910 | Andy McDonald | 146 | 34 | 1910–1919 |
| 1910 | Andy O'Donnell | 13 | 0 | 1910, 1912–1913 |
| 1910 | Jack Wells | 66 | 51 | 1910–1914 |
| 1910 | Bill Goddard | 13 | 2 | 1910 |
| 1910 | Percy Sheehan | 16 | 0 | 1910 |
| 1910 | Les Batty | 1 | 0 | 1910 |
| 1910 | Jim Tumilty | 2 | 1 | 1910 |
| 1910 | Doug Fraser | 11 | 6 | 1910 |
| 1910 | Charlie Hay | 1 | 0 | 1910 |
| 1910 | Claude Cornish | 3 | 1 | 1910 |
| 1910 | Reuben Holland | 2 | 3 | 1910 |
| 1910 | Jack Bristow | 2 | 2 | 1910 |
| 1910 | Jack Massey | 2 | 1 | 1910 |
| 1910 | Tom McCluskey | 4 | 0 | 1910 |
| 1910 | Archie Wilson | 31 | 1 | 1910–1913 |
| 1911 | Ned Bowen | 28 | 14 | 1911–1912 |
| 1911 | Bruce Campbell | 3 | 0 | 1911 |
| 1911 | Tom Hanson | 1 | 0 | 1911 |
| 1911 | Roy Johnson | 15 | 21 | 1911–1912 |
| 1911 | Harry Matheson | 7 | 3 | 1911–1912 |
| 1911 | Charlie Taylor | 3 | 0 | 1911 |
| 1911 | Les Rowe | 2 | 0 | 1911 |
| 1911 | Viv Valentine | 116 | 91 | 1911–1918 |
| 1911 | Herbert Cock | 3 | 0 | 1911 |
| 1911 | Gordon Green | 92 | 85 | 1911–1915, 1919–1921 |
| 1911 | Billy Dick | 100 | 35 | 1911–1918 |
| 1911 | Henry Jane | 3 | 1 | 1911 |
| 1911 | Bert Cowley | 2 | 0 | 1911 |
| 1911 | Tommy Hughes | 6 | 1 | 1911 |
| 1911 | Fred Marriott | 2 | 0 | 1911 |
| 1911 | John Gunter | 1 | 0 | 1911 |
| 1911 | Fen McDonald | 10 | 4 | 1911–1912 |
| 1912 | George Challis | 70 | 16 | 1912–1915 |
| 1912 | Jim Stewart | 2 | 2 | 1912 |
| 1912 | Frank Triplett | 30 | 3 | 1912–1915 |
| 1912 | Harry Haughton | 113 | 49 | 1912–1919 |
| 1912 | Bill Johnson | 7 | 0 | 1912 |
| 1912 | Alf Williamson | 11 | 2 | 1912–1914 |
| 1912 | Herman Bartlett | 2 | 0 | 1912 |
| 1912 | Richard Moran | 27 | 34 | 1912–1913 |
| 1912 | Jack Loughnan | 1 | 0 | 1912 |
| 1912 | Charles Rauber | 1 | 1 | 1912 |
| 1912 | Eric Cochran | 9 | 1 | 1912 |
| 1912 | Paddy Mills | 20 | 0 | 1912–1913 |
| 1913 | Wally Gibbins | 11 | 10 | 1913 |
| 1913 | Paddy O'Brien | 167 | 7 | 1913–1925 |
| 1913 | Alf Baud | 53 | 16 | 1913–1915 |
| 1913 | Dave Earsman | 2 | 0 | 1913 |
| 1913 | Chris Cameron | 5 | 1 | 1913 |
| 1913 | Bill Rogers | 3 | 0 | 1913 |
| 1913 | Justin McCarthy | 3 | 2 | 1913–1914 |
| 1913 | Pat Ryan | 1 | 0 | 1913 |
| 1913 | Harry Curtis | 2 | 1 | 1913 |
| 1913 | Athol Sharp | 56 | 41 | 1913–1916, 1920 |
| 1913 | Harold Evans | 2 | 0 | 1913 |
| 1913 | Frank Hanna | 3 | 1 | 1913–1914 |
| 1913 | Wally Don | 1 | 0 | 1913 |
| 1913 | Les Starr | 1 | 0 | 1913 |
| 1914 | Ted Brown | 95 | 1 | 1914–1920 |
| 1914 | Percy Daykin | 134 | 136 | 1914–1921 |
| 1914 | Arthur Harrison | 1 | 1 | 1914 |
| 1914 | Dan Keily | 53 | 1 | 1914–1917, 1919–1921 |
| 1914 | Steve Leehane | 82 | 14 | 1914–1919 |
| 1914 | Jim Willis | 10 | 1 | 1914, 1918 |
| 1914 | George Calwell | 24 | 3 | 1914–1916 |
| 1914 | Charlie Fisher | 111 | 147 | 1914–1921 |
| 1914 | Herb Burleigh | 32 | 55 | 1914–1915, 1919 |
| 1914 | Jack Lowe | 13 | 9 | 1914 |
| 1914 | Joe Andrew | 2 | 0 | 1914 |
| 1914 | Bill Cook | 16 | 27 | 1914 |
| 1914 | Albert Scaddan | 3 | 1 | 1914 |
| 1914 | Stan McKenzie | 14 | 6 | 1914 |
| 1914 | Jimmy Morris | 26 | 14 | 1914–1917 |
| 1915 | Bill Hore | 15 | 0 | 1915, 1918–1919 |
| 1915 | Joe Shortill | 35 | 25 | 1915–1918 |
| 1915 | Billy Robinson | 30 | 1 | 1915–1916, 1918 |
| 1915 | Vic Gordon | 1 | 0 | 1915 |
| 1915 | George Muir | 3 | 1 | 1915, 1918 |
| 1916 | Mick Dunn | 35 | 4 | 1916–1919 |
| 1916 | Alf Huggett | 1 | 1 | 1916 |
| 1916 | George White | 11 | 0 | 1916–1919 |
| 1916 | Charlie Canet | 80 | 6 | 1916–1921 |
| 1916 | Ernest Carter | 20 | 4 | 1916–1917, 1920 |
| 1916 | Harry Greaves | 9 | 0 | 1916–1917 |
| 1916 | Robert White | 1 | 0 | 1916 |
| 1916 | Frank Rigaldi | 1 | 0 | 1916 |
| 1917 | Lyle Downs | 47 | 31 | 1917–1921 |
| 1917 | Willis Hardy | 3 | 1 | 1917 |
| 1917 | Darcy Lear | 12 | 1 | 1917 |
| 1917 | Frank Martin | 87 | 15 | 1917–1923 |
| 1917 | Jack Greenhill | 41 | 4 | 1917, 1920–1921, 1923 |
| 1917 | Dave Crone | 22 | 4 | 1917–1918, 1920 |
| 1917 | Phil McCumisky | 9 | 0 | 1917–1919 |
| 1917 | Horrie White | 4 | 3 | 1917–1918 |
| 1918 | Ern Cowley | 24 | 51 | 1918–1919 |
| 1918 | Fred Johnson | 77 | 0 | 1918–1922, 1924 |
| 1918 | Jack Keily | 4 | 0 | 1918 |
| 1918 | Leo Tasker | 15 | 13 | 1918–1919 |
| 1918 | Percy Jackson | 1 | 1 | 1918 |
| 1918 | Harry Furnell | 13 | 16 | 1918–1919 |
| 1918 | Jack Woolley | 12 | 7 | 1918–1919 |
| 1918 | Jim Howe | 8 | 2 | 1918–1919 |
| 1918 | Bill Clohesy | 1 | 0 | 1918 |
| 1918 | Frank Mercovich | 10 | 11 | 1918–1920 |
| 1918 | Ray Stewart | 8 | 1 | 1918–1919 |
| 1919 | Bert Boromeo | 69 | 24 | 1919–1923 |
| 1919 | Newton Chandler | 69 | 11 | 1919–1924 |
| 1919 | Morrie Ewans | 18 | 0 | 1919–1921 |
| 1919 | Bert Graf | 2 | 0 | 1919 |
| 1919 | Jack Scobie | 11 | 0 | 1919 |
| 1919 | Joe Prince | 10 | 1 | 1919 |
| 1919 | Les Kittle | 5 | 0 | 1919 |
| 1919 | Stewart McLatchie | 72 | 103 | 1919–1924 |

=== 1920s ===
| Debut Year | Player | Games | Goals | Years at Club |
|---|---|---|---|---|
| 1920 | Rupe Hiskins | 74 | 9 | 1920–1924 |
| 1920 | Vic Truman | 1 | 0 | 1920 |
| 1920 | Dick Wittmann | 12 | 13 | 1920–1921 |
| 1920 | Horrie Clover | 147 | 396 | 1920–1924, 1926–1931 |
| 1920 | Clarrie Clowe | 12 | 0 | 1920–1921 |
| 1920 | Clarrie Calwell | 2 | 0 | 1920 |
| 1920 | Wally Raleigh | 32 | 0 | 1920–1921 |
| 1920 | Billy Blackman | 54 | 9 | 1920–1924 |
| 1920 | Jack Morrissey | 56 | 0 | 1920, 1922–1923, 1925–1927 |
| 1920 | Alf Key | 1 | 0 | 1920 |
| 1920 | Jack Stephenson | 22 | 5 | 1920–1922 |
| 1920 | Edric Bickford | 21 | 22 | 1920–1922 |
| 1920 | Johnny Downs | 1 | 0 | 1920 |
| 1920 | Ted Baker | 1 | 0 | 1920 |
| 1920 | Vern Wright | 5 | 0 | 1920, 1922 |
| 1920 | Croft McKenzie | 21 | 0 | 1920–1923 |
| 1920 | Maurie Beasy | 76 | 11 | 1920–1928 |
| 1921 | Alex Duncan | 141 | 88 | 1921–1924, 1926–1930 |
| 1921 | Harry Bell | 55 | 5 | 1921–1927 |
| 1921 | Harry Morgan | 10 | 25 | 1921 |
| 1921 | Jim Watson | 91 | 0 | 1921, 1923–1929 |
| 1921 | Harry Toole | 59 | 21 | 1921–1925 |
| 1921 | Dan Whannell | 14 | 2 | 1921–1923 |
| 1921 | Frank Murphy | 1 | 0 | 1921 |
| 1922 | George Bolt | 18 | 1 | 1922–1923 |
| 1922 | Jim Fraser | 14 | 13 | 1922–1923 |
| 1922 | Ernie Dingwall | 8 | 1 | 1922 |
| 1922 | Charlie Greenhill | 3 | 0 | 1922 |
| 1922 | Eric Humphrey | 4 | 1 | 1922 |
| 1922 | Frank Pritchard | 20 | 11 | 1922–1923 |
| 1922 | Alec Farrow | 14 | 14 | 1922–1923 |
| 1922 | Jimmy Goonan | 22 | 1 | 1922–1924, 1927 |
| 1922 | Johnny Davies | 32 | 7 | 1922–1924 |
| 1922 | Joe Russell | 16 | 2 | 1922–1923, 1925 |
| 1922 | Graham Kemp | 1 | 0 | 1922 |
| 1922 | Leo Credlin | 16 | 18 | 1922–1925 |
| 1923 | Hedley Blackmore | 51 | 76 | 1923–1927 |
| 1923 | Rowley Faust | 13 | 0 | 1923 |
| 1923 | Ray Brew | 118 | 31 | 1923–1926, 1928–1931 |
| 1923 | Bob Wilson | 25 | 0 | 1923–1925 |
| 1923 | Fred Pringle | 22 | 7 | 1923–1924 |
| 1923 | Ernie Martin | 4 | 0 | 1923, 1925 |
| 1923 | Tom Hart | 9 | 13 | 1923 |
| 1923 | Garney Goodrick | 21 | 5 | 1923–1925 |
| 1923 | Les Husband | 14 | 2 | 1923–1924 |
| 1923 | Pat Kennedy | 23 | 15 | 1923–1925 |
| 1923 | Roy Dick | 1 | 0 | 1923 |
| 1923 | Clyde Hill | 1 | 0 | 1923 |
| 1924 | Charlie Anderson | 1 | 0 | 1924 |
| 1924 | Ray Harper | 2 | 0 | 1924 |
| 1924 | Stan Trebilco | 21 | 10 | 1924–1925 |
| 1924 | Harold Carter | 63 | 54 | 1924–1928 |
| 1924 | Clarrie Uren | 6 | 0 | 1924 |
| 1924 | Ernie McAlpine | 14 | 11 | 1924, 1926 |
| 1924 | Aub Charleston | 13 | 3 | 1924–1925 |
| 1924 | Jim Robertson | 8 | 7 | 1924, 1926 |
| 1924 | Norm Sexton | 3 | 0 | 1924 |
| 1924 | Harvey Dunn, Sr. | 71 | 139 | 1924–1929 |
| 1925 | Ted Brewis | 60 | 12 | 1925–1928 |
| 1925 | Victor Davis | 19 | 42 | 1925–1926 |
| 1925 | Ned Kick | 8 | 0 | 1925 |
| 1925 | Allan Leitch | 17 | 0 | 1925 |
| 1925 | Harold Rumney | 15 | 9 | 1925–1926 |
| 1925 | Billy Stone | 1 | 1 | 1925 |
| 1925 | Jack Vale | 2 | 0 | 1925 |
| 1925 | Jack Way | 4 | 1 | 1925, 1927 |
| 1925 | Ronnie Byrne | 14 | 3 | 1925–1926 |
| 1925 | Hope Evans | 7 | 0 | 1925 |
| 1925 | Bill Koop | 20 | 11 | 1925–1926, 1928 |
| 1925 | Frank Irwin | 45 | 0 | 1925–1927 |
| 1925 | Gerald O'Halloran | 1 | 0 | 1925 |
| 1925 | Carl Keller | 1 | 0 | 1925 |
| 1925 | Charlie McSwain | 68 | 13 | 1925–1930 |
| 1925 | Percy Outram | 24 | 43 | 1925–1927 |
| 1925 | Jack Cahill | 4 | 3 | 1925 |
| 1925 | Frank Donoghue | 51 | 3 | 1925–1928 |
| 1925 | Maurie Connell | 51 | 18 | 1925–1929 |
| 1925 | George Robbins | 4 | 0 | 1925, 1929 |
| 1925 | Harry McPherson | 8 | 2 | 1925–1926 |
| 1926 | Joe Kelly | 137 | 15 | 1926–1934 |
| 1926 | Fred Mutch | 7 | 3 | 1926 |
| 1926 | Harry Vallence | 204 | 722 | 1926–1938 |
| 1926 | Norm Collins | 57 | 14 | 1926–1927, 1929–1931 |
| 1926 | Tom Mullens | 7 | 10 | 1926 |
| 1926 | George Styles | 11 | 1 | 1926–1927 |
| 1926 | Bill Manger | 1 | 0 | 1926 |
| 1926 | Les Witto | 6 | 0 | 1926 |
| 1926 | Jack Williamson | 1 | 0 | 1926 |
| 1926 | Fred Gilby | 179 | 4 | 1926–1937 |
| 1927 | George Hawking | 4 | 3 | 1927 |
| 1927 | Les Johnson | 29 | 13 | 1927–1928 |
| 1927 | Tom Kennedy | 1 | 0 | 1927 |
| 1927 | Bill Donald | 2 | 0 | 1927 |
| 1927 | Frank Seymour | 6 | 8 | 1927–1928 |
| 1927 | Dinny Kelleher | 54 | 1 | 1927–1932 |
| 1927 | Jim Shanahan | 2 | 1 | 1927 |
| 1927 | Maurie Johnson | 109 | 70 | 1927–1936 |
| 1927 | Vin Arthur | 64 | 27 | 1927–1928, 1930–1933 |
| 1927 | Tommy Downs | 56 | 44 | 1927–1929, 1931, 1933 |
| 1927 | George Gough | 24 | 66 | 1927–1928 |
| 1927 | Bill Downie | 2 | 0 | 1927 |
| 1927 | Frank Mount | 4 | 0 | 1927–1928 |
| 1927 | Charlie Davey | 143 | 121 | 1927–1937 |
| 1927 | Allan Skehan | 13 | 6 | 1927–1929 |
| 1928 | Hector Ross | 9 | 10 | 1928 |
| 1928 | Billy Wood | 7 | 0 | 1928 |
| 1928 | Harry Davie | 9 | 26 | 1928 |
| 1928 | Colin Martyn | 85 | 2 | 1928–1932 |
| 1928 | Paul Cameron | 2 | 4 | 1928 |
| 1928 | Len Crone | 7 | 0 | 1928, 1930 |
| 1928 | Bert Everett | 4 | 0 | 1928–1929 |
| 1929 | Jim Crowe | 83 | 37 | 1929–1934 |
| 1929 | Alex Doyle | 53 | 32 | 1929–1931 |
| 1929 | Frank Gill | 205 | 14 | 1929–1942 |
| 1929 | Aubrey Martyn | 38 | 0 | 1929–1933 |
| 1929 | Charlie Parsons | 33 | 0 | 1929–1930 |
| 1929 | Jack Green | 86 | 109 | 1929–1933 |
| 1929 | Noel Peverill | 1 | 0 | 1929 |
| 1929 | Ernie Sheil | 7 | 3 | 1929–1930 |
| 1929 | Tom Byrne | 4 | 0 | 1929 |
| 1929 | Jack King | 5 | 0 | 1929 |
| 1929 | Ansell Clarke | 144 | 242 | 1929–1937 |
| 1929 | Fred Williams | 46 | 6 | 1929–1932 |
| 1929 | Bill Lever | 14 | 1 | 1929–1930 |

=== 1930s ===
| Debut Year | Player | Games | Goals | Years at Club |
|---|---|---|---|---|
| 1930 | Les Allen | 29 | 87 | 1930–1931 |
| 1930 | Eric Huxtable | 135 | 4 | 1930–1938 |
| 1930 | Bill Flynn | 1 | 3 | 1930 |
| 1930 | Henry Thomson | 1 | 0 | 1930 |
| 1930 | Ted Pollock | 43 | 20 | 1930, 1932–1937 |
| 1930 | Bruce Scharp | 7 | 1 | 1930–1931 |
| 1931 | Len Clarke | 1 | 0 | 1931 |
| 1931 | Mickey Crisp | 183 | 281 | 1931–1941 |
| 1931 | Rex Job | 1 | 0 | 1931 |
| 1931 | Ern O'Regan | 1 | 0 | 1931 |
| 1931 | Fred Brooks | 2 | 0 | 1931 |
| 1931 | Alf Egan | 36 | 20 | 1931–1933 |
| 1931 | Bernie O'Brien | 12 | 7 | 1931 |
| 1931 | Frank O'Rourke | 22 | 4 | 1931–1932 |
| 1931 | George Morrissey | 9 | 2 | 1931 |
| 1931 | Bill Jones | 6 | 3 | 1931–1932 |
| 1931 | Jack Kidd | 2 | 0 | 1931 |
| 1931 | Eric Little | 25 | 5 | 1931–1934 |
| 1932 | Gordon Mackie | 60 | 2 | 1932–1936 |
| 1932 | Leo Opray | 31 | 2 | 1932–1933 |
| 1932 | Jack Young | 14 | 0 | 1932–1933 |
| 1932 | Ralph Green | 5 | 2 | 1932 |
| 1932 | Frank Walshe | 1 | 0 | 1932 |
| 1932 | Jim Williamson | 1 | 0 | 1932 |
| 1932 | Charlie Street | 33 | 1 | 1932–1933 |
| 1932 | Jim Park | 128 | 5 | 1932–1940 |
| 1932 | Horrie Bullen | 59 | 38 | 1932–1934, 1936–1937 |
| 1932 | Ron Cooper | 157 | 170 | 1932–1942 |
| 1932 | Keith Shea | 91 | 101 | 1932–1937 |
| 1933 | Jack Hale | 123 | 78 | 1933–1941 |
| 1933 | Bob Green | 187 | 58 | 1933–1945 |
| 1933 | Les Hughson | 12 | 7 | 1933–1934 |
| 1933 | Jack M. Cooper | 15 | 31 | 1933–1935 |
| 1933 | Rod Leffanue | 9 | 20 | 1933 |
| 1933 | Steve Bloomer | 3 | 0 | 1933 |
| 1933 | Ray Quinn | 4 | 1 | 1933, 1935 |
| 1933 | Ray Harry | 1 | 0 | 1933 |
| 1934 | Harold Maskell | 11 | 2 | 1934–1935 |
| 1934 | Alby De Luca | 32 | 22 | 1934–1935 |
| 1934 | Bobby Mills | 1 | 0 | 1934 |
| 1934 | Jack Cashman | 17 | 23 | 1934–1935 |
| 1934 | Terry Ogden | 15 | 0 | 1934 |
| 1934 | George Dougherty | 17 | 15 | 1934–1936 |
| 1934 | Frank Finn | 4 | 0 | 1934 |
| 1934 | Keith Dunn | 38 | 33 | 1934–1937 |
| 1934 | Jim Francis | 162 | 52 | 1934–1943 |
| 1934 | Frank Anderson | 155 | 41 | 1934–1944 |
| 1934 | Wally Mutimer | 21 | 6 | 1934–1936 |
| 1934 | Dave Arrell | 4 | 1 | 1934 |
| 1934 | Bernie Treweek | 6 | 0 | 1934–1935 |
| 1935 | Norm Le Brun | 5 | 2 | 1935 |
| 1935 | Rod McLean | 128 | 33 | 1935–1942, 1944–1946 |
| 1935 | Clete Turner | 19 | 3 | 1935 |
| 1935 | Clen Denning | 18 | 23 | 1935–1937 |
| 1935 | Don McIntyre | 100 | 2 | 1935–1942 |
| 1935 | Bert Butler | 25 | 15 | 1935–1938, 1941, 1944 |
| 1935 | George Collard | 17 | 8 | 1935–1938 |
| 1936 | Jack Carney | 84 | 6 | 1936–1941 |
| 1936 | Clem Neeson | 10 | 2 | 1936–1937 |
| 1936 | Harry Hollingshead | 31 | 33 | 1936, 1938–1940 |
| 1936 | Mick Price | 102 | 163 | 1936–1946 |
| 1936 | Gordon Crisp | 8 | 3 | 1936, 1938 |
| 1936 | Bill Kuhlken | 9 | 5 | 1936–1937 |
| 1936 | Norm Cashin | 14 | 0 | 1936–1937 |
| 1936 | Jack Wrout | 130 | 267 | 1936–1944 |
| 1936 | Frank Williams | 3 | 0 | 1936–1937 |
| 1937 | Fred Ayers | 8 | 5 | 1937–1938 |
| 1937 | Paul Schmidt | 78 | 228 | 1937–1942, 1944 |
| 1937 | Arch Shields | 19 | 19 | 1937–1938 |
| 1937 | Bob Chitty | 147 | 32 | 1937–1946 |
| 1937 | Kevin Fox | 12 | 8 | 1937–1939 |
| 1937 | Pat Farrelly | 7 | 7 | 1937 |
| 1937 | Monty Brown | 1 | 0 | 1937 |
| 1938 | Brighton Diggins | 31 | 6 | 1938–1940 |
| 1938 | Charlie McInnes | 118 | 92 | 1938–1946 |
| 1938 | Ken Baxter | 153 | 365 | 1938–1941, 1945–1950 |
| 1938 | Jack McElroy | 17 | 12 | 1938–1939 |
| 1938 | Ron Savage | 111 | 95 | 1938–1945 |
| 1938 | Arthur Sanger | 117 | 1 | 1938–1947 |
| 1938 | Les Watkins | 1 | 1 | 1938 |
| 1939 | Jack Skinner | 38 | 9 | 1939–1941 |
| 1939 | Cyril Mann | 42 | 65 | 1939–1942, 1945 |
| 1939 | Jim Jones | 15 | 1 | 1939–1940, 1945–1946 |
| 1939 | Keith Rae | 15 | 2 | 1939, 1943 |

=== 1940s ===
| Debut Year | Player | Games | Goals | Years at Club |
|---|---|---|---|---|
| 1940 | Jim Mooring | 126 | 161 | 1940–1949 |
| 1940 | Jack Bennett | 119 | 46 | 1940–1947 |
| 1940 | Jack Bavin | 5 | 1 | 1940 |
| 1940 | Bernie Bignell | 6 | 0 | 1940, 1945 |
| 1940 | Gordon Cameron | 17 | 1 | 1940, 1946 |
| 1940 | Bert McTaggart | 9 | 6 | 1940–1941 |
| 1940 | Dick Chandler | 1 | 1 | 1940 |
| 1941 | Jim Baird | 130 | 85 | 1941–1943, 1945–1951 |
| 1941 | Lance Regnier | 7 | 2 | 1941 |
| 1941 | George Bailey | 58 | 12 | 1941–1942, 1947–1948 |
| 1941 | Vin Brown | 117 | 4 | 1941–1948 |
| 1941 | Harcourt Dowsley | 3 | 7 | 1941 |
| 1941 | Fred Davies | 125 | 137 | 1941, 1946–1952 |
| 1942 | Bob Atkinson | 44 | 0 | 1942–1944 |
| 1942 | Wilf Atkinson | 1 | 0 | 1942 |
| 1942 | George Gniel | 29 | 0 | 1942–1943 |
| 1942 | Jack Howell | 137 | 246 | 1942–1944, 1946–1950, 1952–1954 |
| 1942 | Jim Knight | 15 | 7 | 1942–1943 |
| 1942 | Arthur Sleith | 5 | 0 | 1942–1943 |
| 1942 | Lance Collins | 33 | 78 | 1942–1943, 1945 |
| 1942 | Fred Fitzgibbon | 96 | 9 | 1942–1948 |
| 1942 | Bob Standfield | 1 | 0 | 1942 |
| 1942 | Ollie Grieve | 137 | 4 | 1942, 1944, 1946–1952 |
| 1942 | Bert Deacon | 106 | 7 | 1942–1951 |
| 1942 | Bill Brown | 1 | 0 | 1942 |
| 1942 | Reg Morgan | 2 | 0 | 1942 |
| 1943 | Tom Dillon | 15 | 8 | 1943, 1946 |
| 1943 | Ken McLean | 10 | 5 | 1943–1944, 1946 |
| 1943 | Ted Tuohill | 15 | 6 | 1943–1944 |
| 1943 | Neil Tucker | 2 | 0 | 1943 |
| 1943 | Graham Tudor | 19 | 6 | 1943–1944 |
| 1943 | Jim Clark | 161 | 2 | 1943–1951 |
| 1943 | Alan Rayson | 2 | 2 | 1943 |
| 1943 | Max Wilson | 9 | 0 | 1943–1944 |
| 1943 | Ron Hines | 58 | 21 | 1943–1948 |
| 1943 | Ron Boys | 14 | 3 | 1943–1947 |
| 1944 | Harold McDonald | 1 | 0 | 1944 |
| 1944 | Ernie Spence | 4 | 0 | 1944 |
| 1944 | Herb Turner | 86 | 101 | 1944–1949 |
| 1944 | Alex Way | 32 | 27 | 1944–1948 |
| 1944 | Bert Lucas | 7 | 5 | 1944 |
| 1944 | Les McCann | 7 | 1 | 1944 |
| 1944 | Les Marden | 2 | 0 | 1944 |
| 1944 | Doug Williams | 120 | 7 | 1944–1951 |
| 1944 | Jack Conley | 135 | 104 | 1944, 1946–1952 |
| 1944 | Les Gregory | 2 | 0 | 1944–1945 |
| 1944 | Ern Henfry | 84 | 20 | 1944, 1947–1952 |
| 1945 | Wal Alexander | 13 | 0 | 1945–1947 |
| 1945 | Hal Hanton | 2 | 0 | 1945 |
| 1945 | Adrian Hearn | 3 | 5 | 1945 |
| 1945 | Ken Hopper | 17 | 8 | 1945–1946 |
| 1945 | Fred Rose | 2 | 3 | 1945 |
| 1945 | Arthur Hall | 3 | 1 | 1945 |
| 1945 | Clinton Wines | 39 | 10 | 1945–1946 |
| 1945 | Frank McGrath | 8 | 3 | 1945 |
| 1945 | Ken Hands | 211 | 188 | 1945–1957 |
| 1945 | Don Beauvais | 4 | 5 | 1945 |
| 1946 | Ray Garby | 85 | 123 | 1946–1950 |
| 1946 | Ritchie Green | 95 | 1 | 1946–1952 |
| 1946 | Len Harris | 1 | 0 | 1946 |
| 1946 | Jim Clapton | 4 | 3 | 1946 |
| 1946 | Tom Eldridge | 7 | 1 | 1946–1947 |
| 1946 | Alex Hanton | 1 | 1 | 1946 |
| 1947 | Allan Greenshields | 16 | 2 | 1947–1949 |
| 1947 | Bob Kelsey | 21 | 3 | 1947–1948 |
| 1947 | Alan Sorrell | 24 | 3 | 1947–1949 |
| 1947 | Fred Stafford | 102 | 68 | 1947–1952 |
| 1947 | Jack S. Cooper | 3 | 9 | 1947 |
| 1947 | Les Carr | 9 | 0 | 1947–1948 |
| 1947 | Bill Redmond | 7 | 0 | 1947–1948 |
| 1948 | Alan Streeter | 40 | 35 | 1948–1950 |
| 1948 | Frank Cahill | 22 | 2 | 1948–1949 |
| 1948 | Arthur Hodgson | 76 | 7 | 1948–1952 |
| 1948 | Tom Simmons | 27 | 23 | 1948–1949 |
| 1948 | Max Howell | 12 | 1 | 1948–1950 |
| 1948 | Basil Hunter | 5 | 2 | 1948 |
| 1948 | Tom Leehane | 1 | 0 | 1948 |
| 1948 | Ken Aitken | 14 | 0 | 1948–1951 |
| 1949 | Jack Hardy | 4 | 0 | 1949 |
| 1949 | Alan Thynne | 15 | 5 | 1949–1951 |
| 1949 | Geoff Brokenshire | 21 | 18 | 1949–1950 |
| 1949 | Bernie Baxter | 28 | 22 | 1949–1951 |
| 1949 | Jim Davies | 16 | 1 | 1949–1950 |
| 1949 | Frank Bateman | 16 | 13 | 1949–1950 |

=== 1950s ===
| Debut Year | Player | Games | Goals | Years at Club |
|---|---|---|---|---|
| 1950 | Harry Caspar | 58 | 5 | 1950–1953, 1955 |
| 1950 | Bruce Comben | 188 | 36 | 1950–1961 |
| 1950 | Vin English | 115 | 9 | 1950–1956 |
| 1950 | Kevin Hart | 5 | 3 | 1950 |
| 1950 | Jack Mills | 124 | 128 | 1950–1957 |
| 1950 | Harry Dern | 19 | 0 | 1950–1953 |
| 1950 | Doug Guy | 39 | 2 | 1950–1953 |
| 1950 | John Brown | 90 | 0 | 1950–1955 |
| 1950 | Don Calder | 22 | 1 | 1950–1953 |
| 1950 | Laurie Kerr | 149 | 48 | 1950–1959 |
| 1950 | Bill Huntington | 3 | 0 | 1950–1951 |
| 1950 | Harry Sullivan | 31 | 16 | 1950–1954 |
| 1951 | Doug Beasy | 129 | 124 | 1951–1959 |
| 1951 | Keith Warburton | 74 | 91 | 1951–1955 |
| 1951 | Adam Inglis | 2 | 5 | 1951 |
| 1951 | Harvey Dunn, Jr. | 9 | 4 | 1951–1954 |
| 1951 | Johnny Blake | 3 | 0 | 1951 |
| 1951 | Tom Jones | 7 | 4 | 1951–1952 |
| 1951 | Bill Milroy | 90 | 50 | 1951–1956 |
| 1951 | George Stafford | 25 | 0 | 1951–1954 |
| 1952 | John Chick | 119 | 29 | 1952–1960 |
| 1952 | Brian Molony | 27 | 6 | 1952–1955 |
| 1952 | Ron Robertson | 30 | 8 | 1952–1956 |
| 1952 | John Spencer | 44 | 67 | 1952–1954 |
| 1952 | Max Thomas | 24 | 0 | 1952–1954 |
| 1952 | George Ferry | 139 | 7 | 1952–1961 |
| 1952 | Graham Gilchrist | 114 | 26 | 1952–1961 |
| 1953 | Alex Boyle | 8 | 0 | 1953–1954 |
| 1953 | Jack Hosking | 1 | 0 | 1953 |
| 1953 | John James | 195 | 31 | 1953–1963 |
| 1953 | Tony Walsh | 12 | 20 | 1953–1954 |
| 1953 | Max Wenn | 26 | 38 | 1953–1954 |
| 1953 | Noel Evans | 1 | 0 | 1953 |
| 1953 | Dick Gill | 8 | 0 | 1953 |
| 1953 | Ray Martini | 7 | 0 | 1953 |
| 1953 | Gerald Burke | 87 | 113 | 1953–1955, 1957–1960 |
| 1953 | Ken McKaige | 10 | 0 | 1953–1954 |
| 1953 | Peter Webster | 97 | 6 | 1953–1959 |
| 1953 | Peter Bevilacqua | 1 | 0 | 1953 |
| 1954 | George Ilsley | 2 | 1 | 1954 |
| 1954 | Graham Kerr | 13 | 4 | 1954–1955 |
| 1954 | Noel O'Brien | 32 | 118 | 1954–1955 |
| 1954 | Denis Zeunert | 110 | 11 | 1954–1960 |
| 1954 | Frank Munro | 14 | 3 | 1954–1956 |
| 1954 | Bernie Moran | 21 | 5 | 1954–1955 |
| 1954 | Kevin O'Brien | 9 | 3 | 1954, 1956–1957 |
| 1954 | Kevin Hunt | 4 | 0 | 1954 |
| 1954 | Ron Rhodes | 1 | 0 | 1954 |
| 1954 | Bob Crowe | 128 | 62 | 1954–1964 |
| 1955 | Peter Aitken | 11 | 7 | 1955 |
| 1955 | John Cheffers | 4 | 4 | 1955 |
| 1955 | Bob Bosustow | 20 | 4 | 1955–1956 |
| 1955 | Dave Browning | 4 | 1 | 1955 |
| 1955 | Jack Sullivan | 66 | 21 | 1955–1960 |
| 1955 | Graham Donaldson | 106 | 85 | 1955–1962 |
| 1955 | Jack Ellis | 10 | 13 | 1955–1957 |
| 1955 | John Paice | 4 | 0 | 1955 |
| 1955 | Kevin Bergin | 12 | 12 | 1955–1956 |
| 1955 | Colin Holt | 20 | 0 | 1955–1957 |
| 1955 | Leon Berner | 18 | 4 | 1955–1957 |
| 1955 | Barry Archbold | 2 | 0 | 1955 |
| 1955 | Barry Beitzel | 2 | 0 | 1955 |
| 1956 | Kevin Clarke | 57 | 11 | 1956–1959 |
| 1956 | Vic Garra | 22 | 3 | 1956–1959 |
| 1956 | Keith Robinson | 2 | 0 | 1956 |
| 1956 | Max Ellis | 2 | 0 | 1956 |
| 1956 | Don Nicholls | 77 | 32 | 1956–1961 |
| 1956 | Ron O'Dwyer | 13 | 11 | 1956–1958 |
| 1956 | Kevan Hamilton | 11 | 22 | 1956 |
| 1956 | Ross Ousley | 23 | 15 | 1956–1958 |
| 1956 | Brian Buckley | 116 | 6 | 1956–1965 |
| 1956 | Maurie Pope | 7 | 2 | 1956–1958 |
| 1957 | Leo Brereton | 72 | 129 | 1957–1962 |
| 1957 | John Nicholls | 328 | 307 | 1957–1974 |
| 1957 | Denis Strauch | 29 | 16 | 1957–1960 |
| 1957 | Alan White | 23 | 23 | 1957–1959 |
| 1958 | Bill Arch | 38 | 12 | 1958–1962 |
| 1958 | Graham McColl | 10 | 4 | 1958 |
| 1958 | Chris Pavlou | 31 | 9 | 1958–1961 |
| 1958 | John Benetti | 88 | 15 | 1958–1965 |
| 1958 | Len Cottrell | 12 | 2 | 1958–1959 |
| 1958 | John Heathcote | 69 | 70 | 1958–1962 |
| 1958 | Kevin Ryan | 1 | 0 | 1958 |
| 1958 | Sergio Silvagni | 239 | 137 | 1958–1971 |
| 1958 | Don Hall | 10 | 4 | 1958–1960 |
| 1958 | Peter Barry | 77 | 24 | 1958–1963 |
| 1958 | Berkley Cox | 102 | 45 | 1958–1965 |
| 1958 | Bill Armstrong | 2 | 0 | 1958–1959 |
| 1958 | John F. Stephenson | 1 | 0 | 1958 |
| 1959 | Bruce Williams | 62 | 56 | 1959–1964 |
| 1959 | John Williams | 25 | 12 | 1959–1962 |
| 1959 | Don Rainsford | 3 | 1 | 1959 |
| 1959 | John O'Keefe | 10 | 3 | 1959–1960 |
| 1959 | Maurie Sankey | 100 | 61 | 1959–1965 |

=== 1960s ===
| Debut Year | Player | Games | Goals | Years at Club |
|---|---|---|---|---|
| 1960 | Des Lyons | 2 | 1 | 1960 |
| 1960 | Dave McCulloch | 17 | 6 | 1960–1961 |
| 1960 | Barry Bryant | 14 | 5 | 1960–1961 |
| 1960 | Barrie Smith | 6 | 7 | 1960 |
| 1960 | Wes Lofts | 167 | 65 | 1960–1970 |
| 1960 | Max Miers | 6 | 0 | 1960–1961 |
| 1960 | Vasil Varlamos | 44 | 0 | 1960–1964 |
| 1961 | Tom Carroll | 55 | 143 | 1961–1963 |
| 1961 | Ian Collins | 161 | 49 | 1961–1969, 1971 |
| 1961 | Martin Cross | 36 | 36 | 1961–1963 |
| 1961 | Gordon Collis | 95 | 40 | 1961–1965, 1967 |
| 1961 | Graeme Anderson | 79 | 0 | 1961–1968 |
| 1961 | Murray Kick | 55 | 9 | 1961–1965 |
| 1961 | Brian Holcombe | 1 | 0 | 1961 |
| 1961 | Jim Carroll | 2 | 2 | 1961–1962 |
| 1962 | Peter Falconer | 24 | 33 | 1962–1963 |
| 1962 | John Gill | 88 | 38 | 1962–1967 |
| 1962 | Ken Greenwood | 55 | 19 | 1962–1966 |
| 1962 | John Reilly | 39 | 1 | 1962–1965 |
| 1962 | Bruce McMaster-Smith | 26 | 6 | 1962–1964 |
| 1962 | Henry Ogilvie | 2 | 0 | 1962–1963 |
| 1962 | Cliff Stewart | 78 | 6 | 1962–1968 |
| 1963 | John Comben | 38 | 11 | 1963–1966 |
| 1963 | Greg Hardie | 24 | 18 | 1963–1965 |
| 1963 | Doug Ringholt | 4 | 0 | 1963–1964 |
| 1963 | John Goold | 108 | 3 | 1963–1970 |
| 1963 | Trevor Best | 21 | 10 | 1963–1964 |
| 1963 | Kevin Hall | 169 | 51 | 1963–1973 |
| 1963 | Dave Rogers | 7 | 1 | 1963–1964 |
| 1964 | Jim 'Frosty' Miller | 11 | 29 | 1964–1965 |
| 1964 | Barry Gill | 132 | 5 | 1964–1972 |
| 1964 | Ian Nankervis | 27 | 24 | 1964–1966 |
| 1964 | Tony Thiessen | 13 | 7 | 1964 |
| 1964 | Adrian Gallagher | 165 | 235 | 1964–1972 |
| 1964 | Jim Pleydell | 37 | 6 | 1964–1967 |
| 1964 | Brian Henderson | 2 | 0 | 1964 |
| 1964 | Bruce Bentley | 1 | 0 | 1964 |
| 1964 | Roger Hoggett | 12 | 0 | 1964–1965 |
| 1964 | Garry Crane | 148 | 16 | 1964–1976 |
| 1965 | Ron Barassi | 50 | 34 | 1965–1969 |
| 1965 | Terry Board | 41 | 42 | 1965–1968 |
| 1965 | John Kemp | 6 | 0 | 1965–1966 |
| 1965 | Bryan Quirk | 167 | 113 | 1965–1975 |
| 1965 | Jeff Trotman | 3 | 0 | 1965 |
| 1965 | John Lloyd | 29 | 0 | 1965–1967 |
| 1965 | Dennis O'Sullivan | 3 | 0 | 1965 |
| 1965 | Ron Stone | 60 | 13 | 1965–1969 |
| 1965 | Barry Schmidt | 4 | 0 | 1965 |
| 1965 | Stan Harrison | 1 | 0 | 1965 |
| 1966 | Maurie Fowler | 8 | 4 | 1966 |
| 1966 | Ian Robertson | 125 | 86 | 1966–1974 |
| 1966 | Max Thomas | 2 | 1 | 1966 |
| 1966 | Bill Bennett | 11 | 9 | 1966, 1968 |
| 1966 | Peter McLean | 48 | 5 | 1966–1968 |
| 1966 | Vin Waite | 153 | 33 | 1966–1975 |
| 1966 | Gil Lockhart | 2 | 0 | 1966 |
| 1966 | Ricky McLean | 19 | 35 | 1966–1967, 1969, 1971 |
| 1966 | Paul Constance | 3 | 0 | 1966 |
| 1966 | Bob Lane | 2 | 0 | 1966 |
| 1966 | Dick Vandenberg | 3 | 2 | 1966 |
| 1966 | Peter Gilbert | 3 | 0 | 1966 |
| 1966 | Peter Jones | 249 | 284 | 1966–1979 |
| 1966 | John Morrison | 5 | 2 | 1966–1967 |
| 1966 | Ron Auchettl | 17 | 8 | 1966–1969 |
| 1967 | Alex Jesaulenko | 256 | 424 | 1967–1979 |
| 1967 | Brian Kekovich | 34 | 95 | 1967–1968 |
| 1967 | Robert Walls | 218 | 367 | 1967–1978 |
| 1967 | John Leatham | 2 | 0 | 1967 |
| 1967 | Bob Edmond | 10 | 0 | 1967–1968 |
| 1967 | Peter Kerr | 39 | 1 | 1967–1970 |
| 1967 | Dennis Munari | 41 | 21 | 1967–1970 |
| 1967 | Ken Jungwirth | 1 | 0 | 1967 |
| 1967 | Ian Nicoll | 41 | 30 | 1967–1970 |
| 1968 | Brent Crosswell | 98 | 92 | 1968–1975 |
| 1968 | Peter Smith | 15 | 10 | 1968–1970 |
| 1968 | Noel Bishop | 2 | 0 | 1968 |
| 1968 | Ted Hopkins | 29 | 10 | 1968–1971 |
| 1968 | Neil Chandler | 76 | 22 | 1968–1974 |
| 1968 | Gordon Casey | 1 | 1 | 1968 |
| 1969 | Syd Jackson | 136 | 165 | 1969–1976 |
| 1969 | David McKay | 263 | 277 | 1969–1981 |
| 1969 | Bert Thornley | 24 | 3 | 1969–1970 |
| 1969 | Bruce Doull | 356 | 22 | 1969–1986 |
| 1969 | Noel Mewett | 5 | 3 | 1969 |
| 1969 | Phillip Pinnell | 173 | 5 | 1969–1979 |
| 1969 | Doug Baird | 6 | 8 | 1969–1970 |
| 1969 | Barry Armstrong | 204 | 142 | 1969–1981 |

=== 1970s ===
| Debut Year | Player | Games | Goals | Years at Club |
|---|---|---|---|---|
| 1970 | Paul Hurst | 53 | 0 | 1970–1974 |
| 1970 | Brian Walsh | 64 | 111 | 1970–1975 |
| 1970 | John O'Connell | 111 | 0 | 1970–1976 |
| 1970 | Trevor Keogh | 208 | 191 | 1970–1981 |
| 1970 | Andrew Lukas | 34 | 3 | 1970–1973 |
| 1970 | Mark Amos | 6 | 0 | 1970–1971 |
| 1970 | Peter Fyffe | 19 | 1 | 1970–1973 |
| 1970 | Gary Lawson-Smith | 7 | 0 | 1970–1971 |
| 1970 | Barry Mulcair | 20 | 0 | 1970–1971 |
| 1971 | Geoff Southby | 268 | 31 | 1971–1984 |
| 1971 | John Warden | 11 | 0 | 1971–1972 |
| 1971 | Bill Barrot | 12 | 10 | 1971 |
| 1971 | Daryl Gutterson | 1 | 0 | 1971 |
| 1971 | Peter Hall | 36 | 13 | 1971–1974 |
| 1971 | Chris Mitchell | 5 | 6 | 1971 |
| 1971 | Paul O'Brien | 2 | 0 | 1971–1972 |
| 1971 | Peter Warburton | 4 | 1 | 1971–1972 |
| 1972 | Greg Kennedy | 48 | 143 | 1972–1973, 1975 |
| 1972 | David Dickson | 66 | 23 | 1972–1974, 1976 |
| 1972 | Rod Austin | 220 | 20 | 1972–1985 |
| 1972 | Eric Pascoe | 32 | 7 | 1972–1976 |
| 1973 | Ray Byrne | 81 | 13 | 1973–1978 |
| 1973 | Rod Ashman | 236 | 370 | 1973–1986 |
| 1973 | Vin Catoggio | 71 | 97 | 1973, 1975–1976, 1978–1980 |
| 1973 | Craig Davis | 42 | 72 | 1973–1975 |
| 1973 | Lance Styles | 3 | 0 | 1973–1974 |
| 1974 | Graeme Whitnall | 66 | 20 | 1974–1978, 1980–1981 |
| 1974 | Alex Ruscuklic | 9 | 20 | 1974 |
| 1974 | Graeme Robertson | 9 | 2 | 1974–1975 |
| 1974 | Greg Towns | 66 | 23 | 1974–1979 |
| 1974 | Mark Maclure | 243 | 327 | 1974–1986 |
| 1974 | Alan Mangels | 88 | 25 | 1974–1980 |
| 1974 | Max O'Halloran | 5 | 0 | 1974 |
| 1974 | Tony Smith | 2 | 0 | 1974 |
| 1975 | Mike Fitzpatrick | 150 | 150 | 1975–1976, 1978–1983 |
| 1975 | Russell Ohlsen | 47 | 25 | 1975–1978 |
| 1975 | Wayne Deledio | 1 | 0 | 1975 |
| 1975 | Danny Halloran | 15 | 4 | 1975–1977 |
| 1975 | Garry Higgins | 7 | 0 | 1975–1976 |
| 1975 | Rod Galt | 46 | 100 | 1975–1979 |
| 1976 | Kevin Heath | 78 | 0 | 1976–1980 |
| 1976 | Tony Pickett | 60 | 32 | 1976–1979 |
| 1976 | Leigh McConnon | 26 | 4 | 1976–1977 |
| 1976 | Jim Buckley | 164 | 146 | 1976–1988, 1990 |
| 1976 | Peter Brown | 35 | 38 | 1976–1980 |
| 1976 | Trevor Fletcher | 4 | 0 | 1976–1977 |
| 1977 | Tony Southcombe | 13 | 11 | 1977 |
| 1977 | John Tresize | 14 | 1 | 1977–1978 |
| 1977 | Peter McKenna | 11 | 36 | 1977 |
| 1977 | Peter Bedford | 8 | 4 | 1977–1978 |
| 1977 | Jim Canfield | 9 | 2 | 1977 |
| 1977 | Ken Sheldon | 132 | 170 | 1977–1986 |
| 1977 | Michael Young | 37 | 12 | 1977–1980 |
| 1977 | Renato Serafini | 7 | 6 | 1977–1978 |
| 1977 | Wayne Harmes | 169 | 86 | 1977–1986, 1988 |
| 1978 | Warren Jones | 92 | 31 | 1978–1985 |
| 1978 | Peter McConville | 140 | 157 | 1978–1985 |
| 1978 | Denis Collins | 30 | 12 | 1978–1979 |
| 1978 | Peter Fitzpatrick | 9 | 4 | 1978, 1980 |
| 1978 | Peter Halsall | 2 | 2 | 1978 |
| 1979 | Peter Francis | 47 | 15 | 1979–1981 |
| 1979 | Wayne Johnston | 209 | 283 | 1979–1990 |
| 1979 | Robbert Klomp | 84 | 17 | 1979–1983 |
| 1979 | Alex Marcou | 134 | 148 | 1979–1986 |
| 1979 | Michael Jez | 2 | 0 | 1979–1980 |

=== 1980s ===
| Debut Year | Player | Games | Goals | Years at Club |
|---|---|---|---|---|
| 1980 | Phil Maylin | 89 | 48 | 1980–1984 |
| 1980 | Val Perovic | 97 | 1 | 1980–1985 |
| 1980 | Stephen Buckley | 6 | 3 | 1980 |
| 1980 | Des English | 104 | 6 | 1980–1986 |
| 1980 | Greg Wells | 43 | 24 | 1980–1982 |
| 1980 | Scott Howell | 39 | 12 | 1980–1985 |
| 1981 | Mario Bortolotto | 30 | 1 | 1981–1983 |
| 1981 | Peter Bosustow | 65 | 146 | 1981–1983 |
| 1981 | Ken Hunter | 147 | 160 | 1981–1989 |
| 1981 | Denis Lenaghan | 9 | 9 | 1981–1982 |
| 1981 | David Glascott | 173 | 81 | 1981–1991 |
| 1981 | Greg Sharp | 11 | 3 | 1981, 1983 |
| 1981 | Robert Dutton | 1 | 0 | 1981 |
| 1981 | Geoff Hocking | 6 | 0 | 1981 |
| 1981 | Brendan Hartney | 32 | 0 | 1981–1985 |
| 1981 | Rohan Burke | 18 | 9 | 1981, 1983, 1986 |
| 1981 | Spiro Kourkoumelis | 62 | 56 | 1981–1986 |
| 1981 | Rod Waddell | 5 | 2 | 1981–1982 |
| 1981 | Frank Marchesani | 36 | 26 | 1981–1983, 1985 |
| 1982 | Allan Montgomery | 33 | 6 | 1982–1985 |
| 1982 | David Clarke | 9 | 21 | 1982 |
| 1982 | Ross Ditchburn | 28 | 91 | 1982–1983 |
| 1982 | Stephen Easton | 1 | 0 | 1982 |
| 1982 | Paul Meldrum | 158 | 140 | 1982–1992 |
| 1982 | Mark Buckley | 27 | 35 | 1982–1985 |
| 1983 | Rohan Brown | 2 | 1 | 1983 |
| 1983 | Bruce Reid | 33 | 3 | 1983–1985 |
| 1983 | Daryl Gilmore | 1 | 3 | 1983 |
| 1983 | Justin Madden | 287 | 170 | 1983–1996 |
| 1983 | Shane Robertson | 80 | 23 | 1983–1991 |
| 1983 | Mark Williams | 19 | 10 | 1983–1988 |
| 1983 | Andrew Graham | 1 | 0 | 1983 |
| 1983 | Ricky Nixon | 4 | 1 | 1983–1985 |
| 1984 | Tom Alvin | 218 | 95 | 1984–1994 |
| 1984 | Wayne Blackwell | 110 | 80 | 1984–1990 |
| 1984 | David Honybun | 5 | 2 | 1984 |
| 1984 | Fraser Murphy | 107 | 158 | 1984–1991 |
| 1984 | Warren Ralph | 21 | 72 | 1984–1986 |
| 1984 | Peter Dean | 248 | 41 | 1984–1998 |
| 1984 | Ian Muller | 6 | 0 | 1984–1985 |
| 1984 | Michael Kennedy | 59 | 6 | 1984–1989 |
| 1985 | Rhett Baynes | 13 | 6 | 1985–1986 |
| 1985 | David Rhys-Jones | 106 | 73 | 1985–1992 |
| 1985 | Brad Shine | 23 | 2 | 1985–1988 |
| 1985 | Peter Rohde | 46 | 6 | 1985–1987 |
| 1985 | Darren Ogier | 13 | 15 | 1985–1987 |
| 1985 | Stephen Silvagni | 312 | 202 | 1985–2001 |
| 1985 | Neil Gaghan | 3 | 0 | 1985 |
| 1985 | Michael Aitken | 1 | 0 | 1985 |
| 1985 | Warren McKenzie | 67 | 43 | 1985–1990 |
| 1986 | Craig Bradley | 375 | 247 | 1986–2002 |
| 1986 | Jon Dorotich | 132 | 103 | 1986–1993 |
| 1986 | Bernie Evans | 37 | 45 | 1986–1988 |
| 1986 | Mil Hanna | 190 | 83 | 1986–1997 |
| 1986 | Peter Kenny | 11 | 20 | 1986 |
| 1986 | Stephen Kernahan | 251 | 738 | 1986–1997 |
| 1986 | Peter Motley | 19 | 4 | 1986–1987 |
| 1986 | Adrian Gleeson | 176 | 174 | 1986–1996 |
| 1986 | Dean Strauch | 5 | 0 | 1986–1987, 1989 |
| 1987 | Mark Naley | 65 | 74 | 1987–1990 |
| 1987 | Peter Sartori | 54 | 119 | 1987–1991 |
| 1987 | Ian Aitken | 61 | 10 | 1987–1992 |
| 1987 | Richard Dennis | 57 | 40 | 1987–1991 |
| 1987 | Jamie Dunlop | 21 | 3 | 1987–1990 |
| 1987 | Michael Gallagher | 16 | 17 | 1987, 1989 |
| 1987 | Mark Majerczak | 17 | 20 | 1987, 1989–1991 |
| 1987 | Ian Herman | 48 | 39 | 1987–1991 |
| 1988 | Steven Da Rui | 55 | 5 | 1988–1991 |
| 1988 | David Kernahan | 53 | 8 | 1988–1993 |
| 1988 | Gerard Butts | 3 | 0 | 1988–1989 |
| 1988 | Michael Garvey | 3 | 0 | 1988–1989 |
| 1988 | Phillip Poursanidis | 3 | 3 | 1988–1989 |
| 1988 | Luke O'Sullivan | 62 | 58 | 1988–1992, 1994–1997 |
| 1989 | Fraser Brown | 177 | 99 | 1989–2000 |
| 1989 | Glenn Hawker | 27 | 26 | 1989–1991 |
| 1989 | Andrew McKinnon | 15 | 7 | 1989–1990 |
| 1989 | Simon Verbeek | 38 | 33 | 1989–1991 |
| 1989 | Paul Payne | 5 | 0 | 1989 |
| 1989 | Andrew Phillips | 42 | 26 | 1989–1991 |
| 1989 | Dominic Fotia | 18 | 4 | 1989–1991 |
| 1989 | Peter White | 3 | 1 | 1989, 1991 |
| 1989 | Simon Minton-Connell | 19 | 50 | 1989–1991 |
| 1989 | Ashley Matthews | 9 | 3 | 1989–1991 |

=== 1990s ===
| Debut Year | Player | Games | Goals | Years at Club |
|---|---|---|---|---|
| 1990 | Adrian Bassett | 31 | 12 | 1990–1992 |
| 1990 | Stephen Edgar | 14 | 1 | 1990–1991 |
| 1990 | Chris Bond | 22 | 8 | 1990–1992 |
| 1990 | Michael Sexton | 200 | 23 | 1990–2000 |
| 1990 | Tim Rieniets | 24 | 6 | 1990–1991 |
| 1990 | Brett Ratten | 255 | 117 | 1990–2003 |
| 1991 | Andrew Cavedon | 23 | 14 | 1991–1994 |
| 1991 | Mark Arceri | 17 | 26 | 1991–1992 |
| 1991 | Michael James | 12 | 2 | 1991 |
| 1991 | Darren Tarczon | 11 | 5 | 1991–1992 |
| 1991 | Ang Christou | 151 | 20 | 1991–1997, 1999–2002 |
| 1992 | Mark Athorn | 30 | 6 | 1992–1993 |
| 1992 | Ron De Iulio | 104 | 71 | 1992–1999 |
| 1992 | Paul McCormack | 14 | 2 | 1992–1994 |
| 1992 | Steven Oliver | 13 | 8 | 1992–1994 |
| 1992 | Brett Sholl | 35 | 9 | 1992–1994 |
| 1992 | Earl Spalding | 102 | 106 | 1992–1997 |
| 1992 | Matthew Hogg | 114 | 38 | 1992–1999 |
| 1992 | Rohan Welsh | 42 | 59 | 1992–1993, 1996–1997 |
| 1992 | Greg Williams | 109 | 89 | 1992–1997 |
| 1992 | Brendan Parker | 5 | 3 | 1992–1993 |
| 1992 | Anthony Koutoufides | 278 | 226 | 1992–2007 |
| 1992 | Brent Heaver | 64 | 106 | 1992–1996 |
| 1992 | Ben Robertson | 3 | 2 | 1992 |
| 1993 | Andrew McKay | 244 | 28 | 1993–2003 |
| 1993 | Scott Spalding | 1 | 0 | 1993 |
| 1993 | Tim Powell | 11 | 10 | 1993–1994 |
| 1993 | Jeremy Smith | 1 | 1 | 1993 |
| 1994 | Troy Bond | 36 | 26 | 1994–1995 |
| 1994 | James Cook | 25 | 35 | 1994–1995 |
| 1994 | Barry Mitchell | 38 | 25 | 1994–1996 |
| 1994 | Tony Lynn | 27 | 14 | 1994–1996 |
| 1994 | Adrian Whitehead | 63 | 22 | 1994–1997, 1999 |
| 1994 | Dean Rice | 118 | 42 | 1994–2001 |
| 1994 | Peter Green | 1 | 0 | 1994 |
| 1994 | Brad Pearce | 77 | 151 | 1994–1999 |
| 1994 | Matthew Allan | 140 | 72 | 1994–2003 |
| 1995 | Scott Camporeale | 233 | 200 | 1995–2005 |
| 1995 | Matt Clape | 58 | 48 | 1995–1998 |
| 1995 | Simon Beaumont | 152 | 89 | 1995–2003 |
| 1995 | Glenn Manton | 157 | 30 | 1995–2003 |
| 1995 | Ben Harrison | 2 | 0 | 1995 |
| 1996 | Adrian Hickmott | 134 | 107 | 1996–1997, 1999–2003 |
| 1996 | Justin Murphy | 115 | 105 | 1996–2000, 2002–2003 |
| 1996 | Ben Sexton | 4 | 1 | 1996 |
| 1996 | Craig Devonport | 1 | 2 | 1996 |
| 1996 | Aaron Hamill | 92 | 114 | 1996–2000 |
| 1996 | Peter Turner | 2 | 0 | 1996 |
| 1997 | Mick McGuane | 3 | 1 | 1997 |
| 1997 | Lance Whitnall | 216 | 348 | 1997–2007 |
| 1997 | Adam White | 44 | 21 | 1997–2000 |
| 1997 | Andrew Balkwill | 1 | 0 | 1997 |
| 1997 | Ben Nelson | 40 | 6 | 1997–2001 |
| 1997 | Jacob Anstey | 16 | 5 | 1997–1998 |
| 1997 | Darren Hulme | 110 | 56 | 1997–2004 |
| 1997 | Mark Porter | 55 | 13 | 1997–1998, 2000–2001 |
| 1997 | Anthony Franchina | 105 | 26 | 1997–2003 |
| 1997 | Sam Smart | 1 | 0 | 1997 |
| 1998 | Sean Charles | 1 | 0 | 1998 |
| 1998 | Damien Lock | 18 | 0 | 1998–1999 |
| 1998 | Trent Hoppner | 1 | 0 | 1998 |
| 1998 | Damian Lang | 3 | 1 | 1998 |
| 1998 | Kris Massie | 43 | 12 | 1998–2001 |
| 1998 | Tony Bourke | 4 | 0 | 1998–1999 |
| 1998 | John Hynes | 4 | 2 | 1998 |
| 1999 | Brett Backwell | 18 | 12 | 1999–2001 |
| 1999 | Matthew Lappin | 196 | 221 | 1999–2007 |
| 1999 | Ben Thompson | 1 | 0 | 1999 |
| 1999 | Heath Culpitt | 15 | 5 | 1999–2001 |
| 1999 | Simon Fletcher | 84 | 30 | 1999–2003 |
| 1999 | Brendan Fevola | 187 | 575 | 1999–2009 |
| 1999 | Murray Vance | 5 | 1 | 1999, 2001 |

=== 2000s ===
| Debut Year | Player | Games | Goals | Years at Club |
|---|---|---|---|---|
| 2000 | Trent Hotton | 61 | 36 | 2000–2002 |
| 2000 | Michael Mansfield | 54 | 18 | 2000–2002 |
| 2000 | Stephen O'Reilly | 12 | 1 | 2000 |
| 2000 | Scott Freeborn | 48 | 17 | 2000–2002 |
| 2000 | Ryan Houlihan | 201 | 127 | 2000–2011 |
| 2000 | Andrew Merrington | 18 | 11 | 2000–2003 |
| 2000 | Adam Chatfield | 1 | 0 | 2000 |
| 2001 | Jordan Doering | 18 | 11 | 2001–2002 |
| 2001 | Jim Plunkett | 37 | 14 | 2001–2003 |
| 2001 | Simon Wiggins | 116 | 36 | 2001–2009 |
| 2001 | Ian Prendergast | 65 | 14 | 2001–2006 |
| 2001 | Adam Pickering | 7 | 1 | 2001–2002 |
| 2002 | Sam Cranage | 10 | 2 | 2002 |
| 2002 | David Gallagher | 7 | 1 | 2002 |
| 2002 | Corey McKernan | 41 | 60 | 2002–2003 |
| 2002 | Trent Sporn | 50 | 8 | 2002–2006 |
| 2002 | Luke Livingston | 46 | 2 | 2002–2006 |
| 2002 | Lindsay Smith | 3 | 0 | 2002 |
| 2002 | Andrew Eccles | 13 | 2 | 2002–2003 |
| 2002 | Justin Davies | 41 | 20 | 2002–2005 |
| 2002 | Blake Campbell | 11 | 3 | 2002–2003 |
| 2002 | Bret Thornton | 188 | 30 | 2002–2012 |
| 2002 | Callan Beasy | 13 | 6 | 2002–2004 |
| 2002 | Sean O'Keeffe | 6 | 1 | 2002–2003 |
| 2003 | Barnaby French | 71 | 20 | 2003–2006 |
| 2003 | Jonathon McCormick | 26 | 5 | 2003–2004 |
| 2003 | Jarrad Waite | 184 | 252 | 2003–2014 |
| 2003 | Brad Fisher | 99 | 127 | 2003–2010 |
| 2003 | Mick Martyn | 13 | 0 | 2003 |
| 2003 | Karl Norman | 27 | 5 | 2003–2005 |
| 2003 | Kade Simpson | 342 | 139 | 2003–2020 |
| 2003 | Laurence Angwin | 4 | 6 | 2003 |
| 2004 | Jordan Bannister | 53 | 17 | 2004–2009 |
| 2004 | David Clarke | 12 | 2 | 2004–2005 |
| 2004 | Adrian Deluca | 46 | 22 | 2004–2006 |
| 2004 | Daniel Harford | 9 | 2 | 2004 |
| 2004 | Brett Johnson | 32 | 9 | 2004–2005 |
| 2004 | Stephen Kenna | 5 | 3 | 2004 |
| 2004 | Digby Morrell | 32 | 12 | 2004–2005 |
| 2004 | Heath Scotland | 215 | 69 | 2004–2014 |
| 2004 | David Teague | 50 | 2 | 2004–2006 |
| 2004 | Nick Stevens | 104 | 61 | 2004–2009 |
| 2004 | Glen Bowyer | 20 | 0 | 2004–2005 |
| 2004 | Andrew Walker | 202 | 139 | 2004–2016 |
| 2004 | Ricky Mott | 2 | 0 | 2004 |
| 2004 | Cory McGrath | 50 | 4 | 2004–2006 |
| 2004 | Adam Bentick | 68 | 13 | 2004–2008 |
| 2004 | Andrew Carrazzo | 194 | 48 | 2004–2015 |
| 2005 | Eddie Betts | 218 | 330 | 2005–2013, 2020–2021 |
| 2005 | Callum Chambers | 12 | 3 | 2005–2006 |
| 2005 | Troy Longmuir | 11 | 10 | 2005–2006 |
| 2005 | Setanta Ó hAilpín | 80 | 67 | 2005–2011 |
| 2005 | Chris Bryan | 16 | 9 | 2005–2006 |
| 2005 | Jordan Russell | 116 | 18 | 2005–2012 |
| 2006 | Dylan McLaren | 13 | 4 | 2006 |
| 2006 | Marc Murphy | 285 | 189 | 2006–2021 |
| 2006 | Jason Saddington | 20 | 6 | 2006–2008 |
| 2006 | Josh Kennedy | 22 | 11 | 2006–2007 |
| 2006 | Luke Blackwell | 23 | 4 | 2006–2007 |
| 2006 | Jesse Smith | 2 | 0 | 2006 |
| 2006 | Paul Bower | 70 | 5 | 2006–2012 |
| 2006 | Ryan Jackson | 9 | 3 | 2006–2008 |
| 2007 | Cain Ackland | 21 | 4 | 2007–2008 |
| 2007 | Cameron Cloke | 36 | 25 | 2007–2009 |
| 2007 | Bryce Gibbs | 231 | 137 | 2007–2017 |
| 2007 | Joe Anderson | 17 | 0 | 2007–2010 |
| 2007 | Ross Young | 6 | 3 | 2007 |
| 2007 | Adam Hartlett | 11 | 2 | 2007–2009 |
| 2007 | Shaun Grigg | 43 | 10 | 2007–2010 |
| 2007 | Michael Jamison | 150 | 2 | 2007–2016 |
| 2007 | Shaun Hampson | 63 | 32 | 2007–2013 |
| 2007 | Mark Austin | 15 | 1 | 2007–2011 |
| 2008 | Jake Edwards | 5 | 4 | 2008 |
| 2008 | Richard Hadley | 25 | 6 | 2008–2010 |
| 2008 | Chris Judd | 145 | 90 | 2008–2015 |
| 2008 | Darren Pfeiffer | 7 | 4 | 2008 |
| 2008 | Matthew Kreuzer | 189 | 94 | 2008–2020 |
| 2008 | Steven Browne | 23 | 6 | 2008–2010 |
| 2008 | David Ellard | 63 | 37 | 2008–2015 |
| 2008 | Dennis Armfield | 145 | 75 | 2008–2017 |
| 2009 | Jeff Garlett | 107 | 183 | 2009–2014 |
| 2009 | Sam Jacobs | 17 | 3 | 2009–2010 |
| 2009 | Chris Johnson | 15 | 2 | 2009–2010 |
| 2009 | Aaron Joseph | 73 | 10 | 2009–2013 |
| 2009 | Mitch Robinson | 100 | 58 | 2009–2014 |
| 2009 | Greg Bentley | 5 | 2 | 2009 |
| 2009 | Chris Yarran | 119 | 90 | 2009–2015 |

=== 2010s ===
| Debut Year | Player | Games | Goals | Years at Club |
|---|---|---|---|---|
| 2010 | Lachie Henderson | 102 | 101 | 2010–2015 |
| 2010 | Brock McLean | 63 | 37 | 2010–2014 |
| 2010 | Robert Warnock | 67 | 13 | 2010–2015 |
| 2010 | Kane Lucas | 42 | 15 | 2010–2014 |
| 2010 | Simon White | 87 | 12 | 2010–2017 |
| 2010 | Marcus Davies | 17 | 1 | 2010–2013 |
| 2011 | Ed Curnow | 221 | 53 | 2011–2023 |
| 2011 | Nick Duigan | 43 | 10 | 2011–2013 |
| 2011 | Jeremy Laidler | 24 | 2 | 2011–2013 |
| 2011 | Andrew Collins | 11 | 6 | 2011–2012 |
| 2011 | Matthew Watson | 23 | 10 | 2011–2015 |
| 2011 | Zach Tuohy | 120 | 40 | 2011–2016 |
| 2011 | Rhys O'Keeffe | 3 | 0 | 2011–2012 |
| 2011 | Wayde Twomey | 2 | 1 | 2011 |
| 2012 | Josh Bootsma | 14 | 2 | 2012–2013 |
| 2012 | Andrew McInnes | 17 | 1 | 2012–2014 |
| 2012 | Tom Bell | 51 | 36 | 2012–2015 |
| 2012 | Levi Casboult | 146 | 152 | 2012–2021 |
| 2012 | Frazer Dale | 2 | 1 | 2012 |
| 2012 | Patrick McCarthy | 1 | 0 | 2012 |
| 2012 | Luke Mitchell | 1 | 1 | 2012 |
| 2013 | Sam Rowe | 99 | 17 | 2013–2018 |
| 2013 | Dylan Buckley | 39 | 16 | 2013–2017 |
| 2013 | Jaryd Cachia | 14 | 1 | 2013 |
| 2013 | Troy Menzel | 49 | 47 | 2013–2015 |
| 2013 | Nick Graham | 48 | 11 | 2013–2018 |
| 2014 | Andrejs Everitt | 52 | 61 | 2014–2016 |
| 2014 | Dale Thomas | 101 | 34 | 2014–2019 |
| 2014 | Patrick Cripps^ | 255 | 143 | 2014– |
| 2014 | Sam Docherty | 171 | 30 | 2014–2025 |
| 2014 | Blaine Johnson | 7 | 1 | 2014–2015 |
| 2014 | Cameron Wood | 24 | 7 | 2014–2016 |
| 2014 | Ciarán Sheehan | 6 | 0 | 2014–2017 |
| 2014 | Nick Holman | 9 | 0 | 2014–2015 |
| 2015 | Kristian Jaksch | 7 | 1 | 2015–2017 |
| 2015 | Liam Jones | 95 | 16 | 2015–2021 |
| 2015 | Clem Smith | 7 | 0 | 2015 |
| 2015 | Jason Tutt | 14 | 5 | 2015–2016 |
| 2015 | Ciarán Byrne | 22 | 0 | 2015–2018 |
| 2015 | Blaine Boekhorst | 25 | 15 | 2015–2017 |
| 2015 | Matthew Dick | 6 | 0 | 2015 |
| 2015 | Mark Whiley | 9 | 1 | 2015–2016 |
| 2015 | Tom Fields | 2 | 0 | 2015 |
| 2015 | Brad Walsh | 3 | 1 | 2015 |
| 2016 | Sam Kerridge | 42 | 12 | 2016–2018 |
| 2016 | Jed Lamb | 44 | 26 | 2016–2018 |
| 2016 | Andrew Phillips | 29 | 10 | 2016–2019 |
| 2016 | Jacob Weitering^ | 218 | 11 | 2016– |
| 2016 | Matthew Wright | 65 | 73 | 2016–2018 |
| 2016 | Charlie Curnow | 149 | 313 | 2016–2025 |
| 2016 | Lachie Plowman | 125 | 1 | 2016–2023 |
| 2016 | Liam Sumner | 20 | 10 | 2016–2017 |
| 2016 | Daniel Gorringe | 4 | 4 | 2016–2017 |
| 2016 | Jack Silvagni | 128 | 89 | 2016–2025 |
| 2016 | David Cuningham | 58 | 30 | 2016–2024 |
| 2017 | Sam Petrevski-Seton | 94 | 24 | 2017–2021 |
| 2017 | Jarrod Pickett | 17 | 8 | 2017–2019 |
| 2017 | Caleb Marchbank | 56 | 0 | 2017–2024 |
| 2017 | Harrison Macreadie | 9 | 0 | 2017–2019 |
| 2017 | Billie Smedts | 9 | 1 | 2017 |
| 2017 | Tom Williamson | 44 | 4 | 2017–2022 |
| 2017 | Rhys Palmer | 1 | 0 | 2017 |
| 2017 | Zac Fisher | 107 | 53 | 2017–2023 |
| 2017 | Cameron Polson | 19 | 4 | 2017–2020 |
| 2017 | Alex Silvagni | 7 | 0 | 2017–2018 |
| 2017 | Harry McKay^ | 163 | 309 | 2017– |
| 2018 | Paddy Dow | 73 | 21 | 2018–2023 |
| 2018 | Jarrod Garlett | 13 | 5 | 2018–2019 |
| 2018 | Matthew Kennedy | 99 | 50 | 2018–2024 |
| 2018 | Aaron Mullett | 13 | 2 | 2018 |
| 2018 | Cam O'Shea | 11 | 0 | 2018 |
| 2018 | Lochie O'Brien | 66 | 16 | 2018–2023 |
| 2018 | Darcy Lang | 20 | 12 | 2018–2020 |
| 2018 | Pat Kerr | 4 | 2 | 2018–2019 |
| 2018 | Matt Shaw | 2 | 0 | 2018 |
| 2018 | Matthew Lobbe | 8 | 1 | 2018–2019 |
| 2018 | Tom De Koning | 100 | 36 | 2018–2025 |
| 2019 | Alex Fasolo | 3 | 2 | 2019 |
| 2019 | Michael Gibbons | 47 | 25 | 2019–2021 |
| 2019 | Mitch McGovern^ | 122 | 87 | 2019– |
| 2019 | Nic Newman^ | 119 | 11 | 2019– |
| 2019 | Will Setterfield | 55 | 12 | 2019–2022 |
| 2019 | Sam Walsh^ | 158 | 55 | 2019– |
| 2019 | Liam Stocker | 28 | 2 | 2019–2022 |
| 2019 | Josh Deluca | 6 | 4 | 2019 |
| 2019 | Angus Schumacher | 1 | 0 | 2019 |
| 2019 | Hugh Goddard | 2 | 0 | 2019 |

=== 2020s ===
| Debut | Player | Games | Goals | Years at Club |
|---|---|---|---|---|
| 2020 | Jack Martin | 54 | 52 | 2020–2024 |
| 2020 | Jack Newnes | 52 | 21 | 2020–2022 |
| 2020 | Marc Pittonet^ | 95 | 22 | 2020– |
| 2020 | Sam Philp | 2 | 1 | 2020–2023 |
| 2020 | Callum Moore | 2 | 0 | 2020 |
| 2020 | Matt Cottrell^ | 88 | 42 | 2020– |
| 2020 | Josh Honey | 17 | 10 | 2020–2023 |
| 2020 | Matthew Owies | 72 | 89 | 2020–2024 |
| 2021 | Lachie Fogarty | 69 | 30 | 2021–2026 |
| 2021 | Adam Saad | 110 | 4 | 2021–2026 |
| 2021 | Zac Williams | 70 | 44 | 2021–2026 |
| 2021 | Corey Durdin | 64 | 48 | 2021–2025 |
| 2021 | Luke Parks | 8 | 0 | 2021–2022 |
| 2021 | Oscar McDonald | 5 | 2 | 2021–2022 |
| 2021 | Brodie Kemp^ | 74 | 53 | 2021– |
| 2022 | Adam Cerra^ | 94 | 27 | 2022– |
| 2022 | George Hewett^ | 103 | 34 | 2022– |
| 2022 | Jordan Boyd | 40 | 1 | 2022–2026 |
| 2022 | Lewis Young | 70 | 10 | 2022–2026 |
| 2022 | Jack Carroll | 21 | 5 | 2021–2024 |
| 2022 | Jesse Motlop^ | 63 | 59 | 2021– |
| 2022 | Sam Durdin | 2 | 0 | 2022–2024 |
| 2022 | Will Hayes | 2 | 0 | 2022 |
| 2023 | Blake Acres^ | 79 | 31 | 2023– |
| 2023 | Lachlan Cowan^ | 62 | 2 | 2023– |
| 2023 | Oliver Hollands^ | 79 | 15 | 2023– |
| 2023 | Alex Cincotta | 40 | 12 | 2023–2025 |
| 2024 | Orazio Fantasia | 21 | 16 | 2024–2025 |
| 2024 | Elijah Hollands | 33 | 23 | 2024–2026 |
| 2024 | Jaxon Binns | 8 | 3 | 2024–2025 |
| 2024 | Cooper Lord^ | 34 | 9 | 2024– |
| 2024 | Ashton Moir^ | 13 | 15 | 2024– |
| 2025 | Lucas Camporeale | 3 | 0 | 2025–2026 |
| 2025 | Francis Evans^ | 33 | 37 | 2025– |
| 2025 | Nick Haynes^ | 42 | 0 | 2025– |
| 2025 | Will White | 14 | 10 | 2025 |
| 2025 | Matt Carroll^ | 27 | 10 | 2025– |
| 2025 | Harry O'Farrell^ | 6 | 1 | 2025– |
| 2025 | Hudson O'Keeffe | 8 | 3 | 2025–2026 |
| 2025 | Billy Wilson^ | 21 | 0 | 2025– |
| 2025 | Flynn Young | 11 | 7 | 2025–2026 |
| 2026 | Ben Ainsworth^ | 25 | 30 | 2026– |
| 2026 | Campbell Chesser^ | 3 | 0 | 2026– |
| 2026 | Harry Dean | 22 | 1 | 2026– |
| 2026 | Oliver Florent^ | 25 | 2 | 2026– |
| 2026 | Will Hayward^ | 21 | 24 | 2026– |
| 2026 | Liam Reidy^ | 4 | 0 | 2026– |
| 2026 | Jagga Smith^ | 25 | 10 | 2026– |
| 2026 | Talor Byrne^ | 20 | 15 | 2026– |
| 2026 | Wade Derksen^ | 15 | 0 | 2026– |
| 2026 | Jack Ison^ | 8 | 3 | 2026– |
| 2026 | Flynn Riley | 1 | 1 | 2026 |

== AFL Women's players ==
Key
| Order | Players are listed in order of debut |
| Seasons | Includes Carlton only careers and spans from the season of the player's debut to the year in which they left Carlton |
| Debut | Debuts are for AFLW regular season and finals series matches only |
| Games | Statistics are for AFLW regular season and finals series matches only and are correct to round 10, 2025 |
| Goals | Statistics are for AFLW regular season and finals series matches only and are correct to round 10, 2025 |
| ^{^} | Currently listed players |

=== 2010s ===
| Debut | Player | Games | Goals | Years at Club |
|---|---|---|---|---|
| 2017 | Lauren Arnell | 11 | 4 | 2017–2018 |
| 2017 | Laura Attard | 8 | 0 | 2017–2018 |
| 2017 | Shae Audley | 16 | 2 | 2017–2019 |
| 2017 | Bella Ayre | 6 | 4 | 2017 |
| 2017 | Lauren Brazzale | 41 | 7 | 2017–2022 (S6) |
| 2017 | Alison Brown | 7 | 0 | 2017 |
| 2017 | Brianna Davey | 17 | 3 | 2017–2019 |
| 2017 | Nat Exon | 5 | 0 | 2017 |
| 2017 | Kate Gillespie-Jones | 13 | 0 | 2017–2018 |
| 2017 | Danielle Hardiman | 12 | 0 | 2017–2018 |
| 2017 | Sarah Hosking | 30 | 5 | 2017–2020 |
| 2017 | Bianca Jakobsson | 7 | 4 | 2017 |
| 2017 | Jess Kennedy | 4 | 0 | 2017–2018 |
| 2017 | Madeline Keryk | 8 | 0 | 2017–2018 |
| 2017 | Sarah Last | 5 | 0 | 2017–2018 |
| 2017 | Tilly Lucas-Rodd | 18 | 2 | 2017–2019 |
| 2017 | Breann Moody^ | 88 | 27 | 2017– |
| 2017 | Natalie Plane | 36 | 5 | 2017–2022 (S7) |
| 2017 | Gabriella Pound^ | 76 | 6 | 2017– |
| 2017 | Kate Shierlaw | 10 | 3 | 2017–2018 |
| 2017 | Darcy Vescio^ | 87 | 65 | 2017– |
| 2017 | Kate Darby | 2 | 0 | 2017 |
| 2017 | Rebecca Privitelli | 5 | 1 | 2017 |
| 2017 | Tahni Nestor | 3 | 0 | 2017 |
| 2017 | Jordan Ivey | 2 | 1 | 2017 |
| 2017 | Hayley Trevean | 1 | 0 | 2017 |
| 2018 | Maddison Gay | 7 | 1 | 2018 |
| 2018 | Georgia Gee | 40 | 19 | 2018–2022 (S6) |
| 2018 | Tayla Harris | 29 | 25 | 2018–2021 |
| 2018 | Jess Hosking | 30 | 1 | 2018–2021 |
| 2018 | Sophie Li | 7 | 0 | 2018 |
| 2018 | Kerryn Peterson^ | 64 | 4 | 2018– |
| 2018 | Nicola Stevens | 42 | 20 | 2018–2022 (S6) |
| 2018 | Rene Hicks | 4 | 0 | 2018–2019 |
| 2018 | Katie-Jayne Grieve | 2 | 0 | 2018 |
| 2018 | Bridie Kennedy | 4 | 0 | 2018–2019 |
| 2018 | Courtney Webb | 2 | 0 | 2018–2019 |
| 2018 | Tiahna Cochrane | 1 | 0 | 2018 |
| 2019 | Kirby Bentley | 3 | 0 | 2019 |
| 2019 | Chloe Dalton | 16 | 5 | 2019–2020 |
| 2019 | Jessica Edwards | 14 | 1 | 2019–2021 |
| 2019 | Amelia Mullane | 9 | 0 | 2019 |
| 2019 | Madison Prespakis | 34 | 15 | 2019–2022 (S6) |
| 2019 | Jayde Van Dyk | 10 | 0 | 2019–2020 |

=== 2020s ===
| Debut | Player | Games | Goals | Years at Club |
|---|---|---|---|---|
| 2019 | Rhiannon Watt | 2 | 0 | 2019 |
| 2019 | Brooke Walker | 26 | 14 | 2019–2022 (S7) |
| 2019 | Abbie McKay^ | 59 | 7 | 2019– |
| 2019 | Charlotte Wilson | 22 | 0 | 2019–2022 (S6) |
| 2019 | Emerson Woods | 1 | 0 | 2019–2020 |
| 2020 | Joanne Doonan | 2 | 0 | 2020 |
| 2020 | Grace Egan | 23 | 2 | 2020–2022 (S6) |
| 2020 | Mua Laloifi | 45 | 1 | 2020–2023 |
| 2020 | Lucy McEvoy | 3 | 6 | 2020–2022 (S7) |
| 2020 | Brooke Vernon | 3 | 0 | 2020–2022 (S6) |
| 2021 | Charlotte Hammans | 5 | 0 | 2021–2022 (S7) |
| 2021 | Maddy Guerin^ | 34 | 4 | 2021– |
| 2021 | Mimi Hill^ | 50 | 8 | 2021– |
| 2021 | Elise O'Dea | 28 | 7 | 2021–2022 (S7) |
| 2021 | Daisy Walker | 31 | 1 | 2021–2023 |
| 2021 | Serena Gibbs | 6 | 3 | 2021–2022 (S7) |
| 2022 (S6) | Jessica Dal Pos | 33 | 4 | 2022 (S6)–2024 |
| 2022 (S6) | Jessica Good^ | 50 | 8 | 2022 (S6)– |
| 2022 (S6) | Courtney Jones | 9 | 8 | 2022 (S6) |
| 2022 (S6) | Annie Lee | 14 | 1 | 2022 (S6)–2023 |
| 2022 (S6) | Paige Trudgeon | 21 | 0 | 2022 (S6)–2023 |
| 2022 (S6) | Brooke Vickers^ | 28 | 0 | 2022 (S6)– |
| 2022 (S6) | Keeley Sherar^ | 47 | 11 | 2022 (S6)– |
| 2022 (S6) | Poppy Schaap | 3 | 3 | 2022 (S6)–2022 (S7) |
| 2022 (S7) | Mia Austin^ | 27 | 19 | 2022 (S7)– |
| 2022 (S7) | Phoebe McWilliams | 10 | 4 | 2022 (S7)–2023 |
| 2022 (S7) | Amelia Velardo^ | 30 | 1 | 2022 (S7)– |
| 2022 (S7) | Keeley Skepper^ | 37 | 12 | 2022 (S7)– |
| 2022 (S7) | Lily Goss^ | 35 | 5 | 2022 (S7)– |
| 2022 (S7) | Imogen Milford | 8 | 2 | 2022 (S7)–2023 |
| 2022 (S7) | Christina Bernardi | 1 | 0 | 2022 (S7) |
| 2022 (S7) | Taylor Ortlepp | 13 | 1 | 2022 (S7)–2024 |
| 2023 | Marianna Anthony | 14 | 2 | 2023–2024 |
| 2023 | Harriet Cordner^ | 31 | 3 | 2023– |
| 2023 | Erone Fitzpatrick^ | 20 | 15 | 2023– |
| 2023 | Madeline Hendrie^ | 22 | 0 | 2023– |
| 2023 | Genevieve Lawson-Tavan | 18 | 0 | 2023–2024 |
| 2023 | Dayna Finn^ | 25 | 4 | 2023– |
| 2023 | Ciara Fitzgerald^ | 26 | 0 | 2023– |
| 2024 | Lulu Beatty | 4 | 0 | 2024 |
| 2024 | Lila Keck^ | 15 | 4 | 2024– |
| 2024 | Celine Moody | 9 | 2 | 2024 |
| 2024 | Yasmin Duursma^ | 9 | 0 | 2024– |
| 2024 | Tarni Brown^ | 10 | 2 | 2024– |
| 2024 | Meg Robertson^ | 10 | 1 | 2024– |
| 2024 | Jade Halfpenny | 2 | 1 | 2024 |
| 2025 | Tara Bohanna^ | 8 | 9 | 2025– |
| 2025 | Sophie McKay^ | 10 | 10 | 2025– |
| 2025 | Poppy Scholz^ | 10 | 6 | 2025– |
| 2025 | Siofra O'Connell^ | 4 | 0 | 2025– |
| 2025 | Madison Torpey^ | 3 | 0 | 2025– |
| 2025 | Aisling Reidy^ | 4 | 1 | 2025– |
| 2025 | Lou-Lou Field^ | 1 | 0 | 2025– |

== Listed players yet to make their debut for Carlton ==
| Player | Date of birth | Acquired | Recruited from | Listed | |
| Player | Date of birth | Acquired | Recruited from | Rookie | Senior |
|---|---|---|---|---|---|
| Rob Monahan | 29 September 2004 | 2023 category B rookie selection | Kerry GAA (Ireland) | 2024– | —N/a |
| Joel Amartey | 2 September 1999 | Unrestricted free agency | Sydney | —N/a | 2027– |
| Lachie Whitfield | 18 July 1994 | Trade with Greater Western Sydney | Greater Western Sydney | —N/a | 2027– |

== See also ==
- List of Carlton Football Club coaches
