= Max Thomas =

Max Thomas can refer to:

- Max Thomas (gymnast) (1874-1929), American Olympic gymnast
- Max Thomas (SS general) (1891-1945), German SS general
- Max Thomas (bishop) (1926-2008), Australian bishop
- Max Thomas (cricketer) (1921-2001), Australian cricketer
- Max Thomas (footballer, born 1930) (born 1930), former Australian rules footballer for Carlton from 1952 to 1954
- Max Thomas (footballer, born 1945) (born 1945), former Australian rules footballer for Carlton in 1966
- Max Thomas (sprinter) (born 2004), American sprinter
