= Max Ellis =

Max Ellis may refer to:

- Max Ellis (footballer) (born 1933), former Australian rules footballer
- Max Ellis (cricketer) (born 1991), cricketer from Guernsey
- Max Mapes Ellis (1887–1953). American ichthyologist
