= Gil Lockhart =

Australian rules footballer

Personal information
- Full name: Gilbert Lockhart
- Born: 7 April 1945 (age 81)
- Original team: Beaumaris
- Height: 180 cm (5 ft 11 in)
- Weight: 82 kg (181 lb)

Playing career^{1}
Years	Club	Games (Goals)
1966	Carlton	2 (0)
- ^{1} Playing statistics correct to the end of 1966.

Gil Lockhart (born 7 April 1945) is a former Australian rules footballer who played with Carlton and North Melbourne in the Victorian Football League (VFL).
