= Barrie Smith =

Australian rules footballer

Personal information
- Full name: Barrie Smith
- Born: 28 August 1939 (age 87)
- Original team: Tatura
- Height: 170 cm (5 ft 7 in)
- Weight: 68 kg (150 lb)

Playing career^{1}
Years	Club	Games (Goals)
1960	Carlton	6 (7)
- ^{1} Playing statistics correct to the end of 1960.

Barrie Smith (born 28 August 1939) is a former Australian rules footballer who played for the Carlton Football Club in the Victorian Football League (VFL).
