= Frank Mercovich =

Australian rules footballer

Personal information
- Full name: Frank Mercovich
- Born: 19 February 1898
- Died: 12 October 1967 (aged 69)
- Original team: Carlton District

Playing career^{1}
| Years | Club | Games (Goals) |
| 1918–20 | Carlton | 10 (11) |
- ^{1} Playing statistics correct to the end of 1920.

Frank Mercovich (19 February 1898 – 12 October 1967) was an Australian rules footballer who played with Carlton in the Victorian Football League (VFL).

Mercovich moved to Melbourne Football Club for the 1921 VFL season but did not play a senior game.

Following the end of his football career Mercovich turned to figure skating and was Australian national figure skating champion in 1934 and 1936. Mercovich's wife Joyce Macbeth was the three times world champion women's figure skater.
