= Stan Harrison (footballer, born 1944) =

Australian rules footballer

Personal information
- Full name: Stan Harrison
- Born: 28 March 1944 (age 82)
- Original team: West Preston YCW
- Height: 184 cm (6 ft 0 in)
- Weight: 77 kg (170 lb)

Playing career^{1}
Years	Club	Games (Goals)
1965	Carlton	1 (0)
- ^{1} Playing statistics correct to the end of 1965.

Stan Harrison (born 28 March 1944) is a former Australian rules footballer who played with Carlton in the Victorian Football League (VFL).
