= Basil Hunter =

Australian rules footballer

Personal information
- Full name: Basil Frederick Hunter
- Born: 29 November 1925; Carlton, Victoria
- Died: 18 September 1970 (aged 44); Mornington, Victoria
- Original team: Explosives Club
- Height: 183 cm (6 ft 0 in)
- Weight: 79 kg (174 lb)

Playing career^{1}
Years	Club	Games (Goals)
1948	Carlton	5 (2)
- ^{1} Playing statistics correct to the end of 1948.

Basil Frederick Hunter (29 November 1925 – 18 September 1970) was an Australian rules footballer who played for the Carlton Football Club in the Victorian Football League (VFL).
