= Des Meadowcroft =

Australian rules footballer

Personal information
- Full name: Desmond Meadowcroft
- Born: 31 March 1880; South Melbourne, Victoria
- Died: 22 September 1959 (aged 79); North Sydney, New South Wales
- Original team: Richmond Star

Playing career^{1}
Years	Club	Games (Goals)
1898	Carlton	2 (0)
- ^{1} Playing statistics correct to the end of 1898.

Des Meadowcroft (31 March 1880 – 22 September 1959) was an Australian rules footballer who played with Carlton in the Victorian Football League (VFL).
