= Jack Bavin (Australian footballer) =

Australian rules footballer

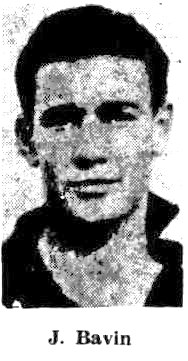
- Bavin in 1937

Personal information
- Full name: John Graham Bavin
- Born: 15 August 1917; Mount Gambier, South Australia
- Died: 14 May 1972 (aged 54); Adelaide, South Australia
- Original teams: Narracoorte & Mount Gambier
- Height: 183 cm (6 ft 0 in)
- Weight: 82 kg (181 lb)

Playing career^{1}
Years	Club	Games (Goals)
1940	Carlton	5 (1)
- ^{1} Playing statistics correct to the end of 1940.

John Graham Bavin (15 August 1917 – 14 May 1972) was an Australian rules footballer who played with Carlton in the Victorian Football League (VFL).
