= Henry Crane =

Australian rules footballer (1869–1921)

Personal information
- Full name: Henry Alfred John Crane
- Born: 12 September 1869; Ballarat, Victoria
- Died: 12 May 1921 (aged 51); Brighton, Victoria
- Original team: Ballarat

Playing career^{1}
Years	Club	Games (Goals)
1897	Carlton	8 (0)
- ^{1} Playing statistics correct to the end of 1897.

Henry Alfred John Crane (12 September 1869 – 12 May 1921) was an Australian rules footballer who played with Carlton in the Victorian Football League (VFL).
