= Bill Redmond (footballer) =

Australian rules footballer

Personal information
- Full name: William George Arthur Redmond
- Born: 29 May 1927 (age 99); North Melbourne, Victoria
- Original team: Williamstown
- Height: 182 cm (6 ft 0 in)
- Weight: 80 kg (176 lb)

Playing career^{1}
Years	Club	Games (Goals)
1947–48	Carlton	7 (0)
- ^{1} Playing statistics correct to the end of 1948.

William George Arthur Redmond (born 29 May 1927) is a former Australian rules footballer who played with Carlton in the Victorian Football League (VFL).
