= Jack Reekie =

Australian rules footballer

Personal information
- Full name: John Reekie
- Born: 12 March 1871; Melbourne, Victoria
- Died: 5 September 1963 (aged 92); Murrumbeena, Victoria
- Original team: Albion
- Position: Defense

Playing career^{1}
Years	Club	Games (Goals)
1897–98	Carlton	27 (0)
- ^{1} Playing statistics correct to the end of 1898.

Jack Reekie (12 March 1871 – 5 September 1963) was an Australian rules footballer who played with Carlton in the Victorian Football League (VFL).
