= Vin Arthur =

Australian rules footballer, born 1905

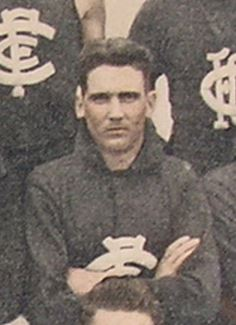
- Arthur in 1928

Personal information
- Full name: Vincent Lionel Arthur
- Born: 23 March 1905; Prahran, Victoria
- Died: 6 November 1970 (aged 65); Box Hill, Victoria
- Original team: Richmond District / Drouin
- Height: 179 cm (5 ft 10 in)
- Weight: 72 kg (159 lb)

Playing career^{1}
Years	Club	Games (Goals)
1926–27	St Kilda	16 (5)
1927–28, 1930–33	Carlton	64 (27)
Total		80 (32)
- ^{1} Playing statistics correct to the end of 1933.

Vincent Lionel Arthur (23 March 1905 – 6 November 1970) was an Australian rules footballer who played with Carlton and St Kilda in the Victorian Football League (VFL).
