= Garry Higgins =

Australian rules footballer

Personal information
- Full name: Garry Higgins
- Born: 15 June 1955 (age 71)
- Original team: Maryborough
- Height: 180 cm (5 ft 11 in)
- Weight: 76 kg (168 lb)

Playing career^{1}
Years	Club	Games (Goals)
1975–1976	Carlton	7 (0)
- ^{1} Playing statistics correct to the end of 1976.

Garry Higgins (born 15 June 1955) is a former Australian rules footballer who played with Carlton in the Victorian Football League (VFL).
