= Dick Vandenberg =

Australian rules footballer

Personal information
- Full name: Richard Vandenberg
- Born: 9 October 1947 (age 79)
- Original team: Robinvale
- Height: 183 cm (6 ft 0 in)
- Weight: 79 kg (174 lb)

Playing career^{1}
Years	Club	Games (Goals)
1966	Carlton	3 (2)
- ^{1} Playing statistics correct to the end of 1966.

Richard Vandenberg (born 9 October 1947) is a former Australian rules footballer who played with Carlton in the Victorian Football League (VFL).
