= Jim Pleydell =

Australian rules footballer

Personal information
- Full name: Jim Pleydell
- Born: 1 April 1944 (age 82)
- Original team: Maffra
- Height: 179 cm (5 ft 10 in)
- Weight: 74.5 kg (164 lb)

Playing career^{1}
Years	Club	Games (Goals)
1964–67	Carlton	37 (6)
- ^{1} Playing statistics correct to the end of 1967.

Jim Pleydell (born 1 April 1944) is a former Australian rules footballer who played with Carlton in the Victorian Football League (VFL).

He later played in Tasmania with Cooee in the NWFU competition, winning the club's Best and Fairest award in 1971.
