= Gerald O'Dwyer =

Australian rules footballer

Personal information
- Full name: George Augustus O'Dwyer
- Born: 24 September 1872; South Melbourne, Victoria
- Died: 18 September 1908 (aged 35); Middle Park, Victoria
- Original team: Melbourne (VFA) / Napier Imperials

Playing career^{1}
Years	Club	Games (Goals)
1900	Carlton	16 (0)
- ^{1} Playing statistics correct to the end of 1900.

George Augustus "Gerald" O'Dwyer (24 September 1872 – 18 September 1908) was an Australian rules footballer who played with Carlton in the Victorian Football League (VFL).
