= Jim McFarlane =

Australian rules footballer (1876–1960)

Personal information
- Full name: James Robert McFarlane
- Born: 15 September 1876; Balranald, New South Wales
- Died: 21 May 1960 (aged 83); Frankston, Victoria
- Original team: Bendigo

Playing career^{1}
Years	Club	Games (Goals)
1902	Carlton	1 (0)
- ^{1} Playing statistics correct to the end of 1902.

Jim McFarlane (15 September 1876 – 21 May 1960) was an Australian rules footballer who played with Carlton in the Victorian Football League (VFL).
