= Greg Hardie =

Australian rules footballer

Personal information
- Full name: Greg Hardie
- Born: 23 May 1945 (age 81)
- Original team: Leitchville
- Height: 170 cm (5 ft 7 in)
- Weight: 76 kg (168 lb)
- Position: Rover

Playing career^{1}
Years	Club	Games (Goals)
1963–65	Carlton	24 (18)
- ^{1} Playing statistics correct to the end of 1965.

Greg Hardie (born 23 May 1945) is a former Australian rules footballer who played with Carlton in the Victorian Football League (VFL).
