= Rob Dashwood =

Australian rules footballer

Personal information
- Full name: Robert Dashwood
- Born: 2 January 1882; Kent Town, South Australia
- Died: 3 December 1964 (aged 82); Sydney, New South Wales
- Original team: South Yarra

Playing career^{1}
Years	Club	Games (Goals)
1902	Carlton	3 (0)
- ^{1} Playing statistics correct to the end of 1902.

Rob Dashwood (2 January 1882 – 3 December 1964) was an Australian rules footballer who played with Carlton in the Victorian Football League (VFL).
