= Jack Hosking =

Australian rules footballer

Personal information
- Full name: Jack Hosking
- Born: 31 December 1931
- Died: 25 July 1998 (aged 66)
- Original team: South Bendigo
- Height: 175 cm (5 ft 9 in)
- Weight: 72.5 kg (160 lb)

Playing career^{1}
Years	Club	Games (Goals)
1953	Carlton	1 (0)
- ^{1} Playing statistics correct to the end of 1953.

Jack Hosking (31 December 1931 – 25 July 1998) was an Australian rules footballer who played with Carlton in the Victorian Football League (VFL).
