= Bill T. Downie =

Australian rules footballer

Bill Downie

Personal information
- Full name: Thomas William Downie
- Born: 3 April 1904; Carlton, Victoria
- Died: 26 November 1952 (aged 48); Parkville, Victoria
- Original team: Carlton District
- Height: 173 cm (5 ft 8 in)
- Weight: 76 kg (168 lb)

Playing career^{1}
Years	Club	Games (Goals)
1927	Carlton	2 (0)
- ^{1} Playing statistics correct to the end of 1927.

Bill Downie (3 April 1904 – 26 November 1952) was an Australian rules footballer who played with Carlton in the Victorian Football League (VFL).

Downie was born Thomas William McKenna, the son of Katherine McKenna (1890–1932) and took the name Downie when his mother married Albert Cornelius Downie in 1908.

Downie died in an accident when a trench he was working in collapsed.
