= Norm Hogg =

Australian rules footballer

Personal information
- Full name: Norman Howard Hogg
- Born: 1 June 1883; South Melbourne, Victoria
- Died: 9 October 1945 (aged 62); East Melbourne, Victoria
- Original team: Boroondara

Playing career^{1}
Years	Club	Games (Goals)
1902–04	Carlton	3 (2)
- ^{1} Playing statistics correct to the end of 1904.

Norman Howard Hogg (1 June 1883 – 9 October 1945) was an Australian rules footballer who played with Carlton in the Victorian Football League (VFL).
