= Vic Truman =

Australian rules footballer

Personal information
- Full name: Victor Clarence Truman
- Born: 21 December 1899; Carlton, Victoria
- Died: 7 November 1976 (aged 76); Williamstown, Victoria
- Original team: Carlton District
- Height: 173 cm (5 ft 8 in)
- Weight: 69 kg (152 lb)

Playing career^{1}
Years	Club	Games (Goals)
1920	Carlton	1 (0)
1926	Fitzroy	10 (0)
Total		11 (0)
- ^{1} Playing statistics correct to the end of 1926.

Victor Clarence Truman (21 December 1899 – 7 November 1976) was an Australian rules footballer who played with Carlton and Fitzroy in the Victorian Football League (VFL).
