= Tom Simmons (footballer) =

Australian rules footballer

Personal information
- Full name: Thomas Edwin Simmons
- Born: 13 April 1929
- Died: 1 October 2013 (aged 84)
- Original team: Northcote Districts
- Height: 183 cm (6 ft 0 in)
- Weight: 82.5 kg (182 lb)

Playing career^{1}
Years	Club	Games (Goals)
1948–49	Carlton	27 (23)
- ^{1} Playing statistics correct to the end of 1949.

Thomas Edwin Simmons (13 April 1929 – 1 October 2013) was an Australian rules footballer who played with Carlton in the Victorian Football League (VFL).
