= Archie McNeel =

Australian rules footballer

Personal information
- Full name: Archibald Langley McNeel
- Born: 20 January 1882; Castlemaine, Victoria
- Died: 22 February 1926 (aged 44); Lara, Victoria
- Original team: Castlemaine

Playing career^{1}
Years	Club	Games (Goals)
1905	Carlton	10 (0)
- ^{1} Playing statistics correct to the end of 1905.

Archibald Langley McNeel (20 January 1882 – 22 February 1926) was an Australian rules footballer who played for the Carlton Football Club in the Victorian Football League (VFL).
