= Les Starr =

Australian rules footballer

Personal information
- Full name: Leslie Victor Starr
- Born: 17 January 1893; Kew, Victoria
- Died: 29 December 1954 (aged 61); Warrnambool, Victoria
- Original team: Yarragon
- Height: 185 cm (6 ft 1 in)
- Weight: 83 kg (183 lb)
- Position: Defence

Playing career^{1}
Years	Club	Games (Goals)
1913	Carlton	1 (0)
- ^{1} Playing statistics correct to the end of 1913.

Leslie Victor Starr (17 January 1893 – 29 December 1954) was an Australian rules footballer who played with Carlton in the Victorian Football League (VFL).
