= Joe Paton =

Australian rules footballer

Personal information
- Full name: John Martin Paton
- Born: 5 September 1878; Williamstown, Victoria
- Died: 21 August 1952 (aged 73); Williamstown, Victoria
- Original team: Albion United
- Position: Follower

Playing career^{1}
| Years | Club | Games (Goals) |
| 1896 | Carlton (VFA) | 17 (3) |
| 1897 | Carlton | 5 (0) |
| 1898 | North Melbourne (VFA) | 10 (5) |
- ^{1} Playing statistics correct to the end of 1898.

John Martin "Joe" Paton (5 September 1878 – 21 August 1952) was an Australian rules footballer who played with Carlton in the Victorian Football League (VFL).

== Family ==
The son of Robert Paton (1849–1926), and Mary Ann Paton (1851–1888), née Martin, John Martin Paton was born at Williamstown, Victoria on 5 September 1878.

== Death ==
He died at Williamstown, Victoria on 21 August 1952.
