= Peter Gilbert (Australian footballer) =

Australian rules footballer

Personal information
- Full name: Peter Gilbert
- Born: 31 December 1948 (age 77)
- Original team: Broadmeadows
- Height: 177 cm (5 ft 10 in)
- Weight: 79 kg (174 lb)

Playing career^{1}
Years	Club	Games (Goals)
1966	Carlton	3 (0)
- ^{1} Playing statistics correct to the end of 1966.

Peter Gilbert (born 31 December 1948) is a former Australian rules footballer who played with Carlton in the Victorian Football League (VFL).
