= Artie McSpeerin =

Australian rules footballer

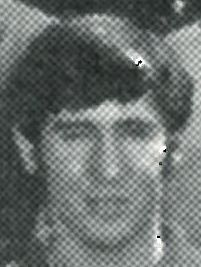

Personal information
- Full name: Arthur Leo McSpeerin
- Born: 26 February 1880; Carlton, Victoria
- Died: 1 May 1935 (aged 55); Wellington, New Zealand
- Original team: Phoenix / Essendon Town
- Height: 174 cm (5 ft 9 in)

Playing career^{1}
Years	Club	Games (Goals)
1899	Carlton	2 (2)
1903	Melbourne	1 (0)
Total		3 (2)
- ^{1} Playing statistics correct to the end of 1903.

Arthur Leo McSpeerin (26 February 1880 – 1 May 1935) was an Australian rules footballer who played for the Carlton Football Club and Melbourne Football Club in the Victorian Football League (VFL).

He also played District cricket for Collingwood and enlisted to serve in World War I but the war ended before he saw active duty.

He died in Wellington, New Zealand after an accident with a fire engine.
