= Jim Loriot =

Australian rules footballer

Personal information
- Full name: James Loriot
- Born: 16 January 1879; Fitzroy, Victoria
- Died: 18 August 1951 (aged 72); Ivanhoe, Victoria
- Original team: Collingwood Juniors

Playing career^{1}
Years	Club	Games (Goals)
1901	Carlton	4 (0)
- ^{1} Playing statistics correct to the end of 1901.

Jim Loriot (16 January 1879 – 18 August 1951) was an Australian rules footballer who played with Carlton in the Victorian Football League (VFL).
