= Jim Opie =

Australian rules footballer

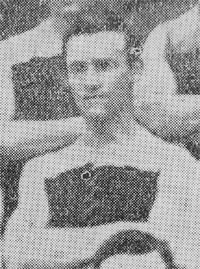
- Opie during his Carlton career

Personal information
- Full name: Archelaus James Opie
- Born: 1 March 1883; Quarry Hill, Victoria
- Died: 20 July 1981 (aged 98); Lismore, New South Wales
- Original team: Melbourne University

Playing career^{1}
Years	Club	Games (Goals)
1899	St Kilda	1 (0)
1902–03, 1905	Carlton	27 (3)
Total		28 (3)
- ^{1} Playing statistics correct to the end of 1905.

Archelaus James Opie (1 March 1883 – 20 July 1981) was an Australian rules footballer who played with St Kilda and Carlton in the Victorian Football League (VFL).
