= Pat McNulty (footballer) =

Australian rules footballer

Personal information
- Full name: Patrick McNulty
- Born: 25 February 1872; Clare, South Australia
- Died: 6 October 1904 (aged 32)
- Original team: Carlton Imperials

Playing career^{1}
Years	Club	Games (Goals)
1902	Carlton	1 (0)
- ^{1} Playing statistics correct to the end of 1902.

Pat McNulty (25 February 1872 – 6 October 1904) was an Australian rules footballer who played with Carlton in the Victorian Football League (VFL).
