= Dave Earsman =

Australian rules footballer

Personal information
- Full name: David Earsman
- Born: 6 January 1882; Swan Hill, Victoria
- Died: 19 January 1919 (aged 37); Carlton, Victoria
- Original team: Northcote

Playing career^{1}
Years	Club	Games (Goals)
1909	Fitzroy	3 (0)
1913	Carlton	2 (0)
Total		5 (0)
- ^{1} Playing statistics correct to the end of 1913.

David Earsman (6 January 1882 – 19 January 1919) was an Australian rules footballer who played with Fitzroy and Carlton in the Victorian Football League (VFL).
