= Harry Newbound =

Australian rules footballer

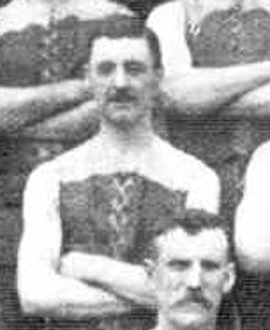
- Newbound during his Carlton career

Personal information
- Full name: Henry Joseph Newbound
- Born: 25 September 1881; Collingwood, Victoria
- Died: 2 October 1961 (aged 80); Parkville, Victoria
- Original team: Blenheim

Playing career^{1}
Years	Club	Games (Goals)
1902	Collingwood	1 (0)
1904–05	Carlton	18 (2)
Total		19 (2)
- ^{1} Playing statistics correct to the end of 1905.

Henry Joseph Newbound (25 September 1881 – 2 October 1961) was an Australian rules footballer who played with Collingwood and Carlton in the Victorian Football League (VFL).
