= Gerald O'Halloran =

Australian rules footballer, born 1902

Personal information
- Full name: Gerald O'Halloran
- Born: 13 May 1902; Benalla
- Died: 6 January 1950 (aged 47); Coburg, Victoria
- Original team: Sydney District

Playing career^{1}
Years	Club	Games (Goals)
1925	Carlton	1 (0)
- ^{1} Playing statistics correct to the end of 1925.

Gerald O'Halloran (13 May 1902 – 6 January 1950) was an Australian rules footballer who played with Carlton in the Victorian Football League (VFL).

He later worked for the Taxation Department and was also an accomplished saxophonist and flautist, playing in theatres in Melbourne and Sydney. He died at his home in Coburg on 6 January 1950.
