= Ron Robertson =

Australian rules footballer (born 1933)

Personal information
- Full name: Ron Robertson
- Born: 24 June 1933 (age 93)
- Original team: South Bendigo
- Height: 175 cm (5 ft 9 in)
- Weight: 71.5 kg (158 lb)

Playing career^{1}
Years	Club	Games (Goals)
1952–56	Carlton	30 (8)
- ^{1} Playing statistics correct to the end of 1956.

Ron Robertson (born 24 June 1933) is a former Australian rules footballer who played with Carlton in the Victorian Football League (VFL).
