= Bert Graf =

Australian rules footballer

Personal information
- Full name: Bert Graf
- Born: 2 August 1896
- Died: 1 September 1968 (aged 72)
- Original team: Williamstown Juniors / Melbourne District

Playing career^{1}
Years	Club	Games (Goals)
1919	Carlton	2 (0)
- ^{1} Playing statistics correct to the end of 1919.

Bert Graf (2 August 1896 – 1 September 1968) was an Australian rules footballer who played for the Carlton Football Club in the Victorian Football League (VFL).
