= Fred Marriott (footballer) =

Australian rules footballer

Personal information
- Full name: Frederick Marriott
- Born: 14 February 1886; Malvern, Victoria
- Died: 13 May 1954 (aged 68); Enoggera, Queensland
- Original team: Werribee
- Height: 173 cm (5 ft 8 in)
- Weight: 68 kg (150 lb)
- Position: Halfback

Playing career^{1}
Years	Club	Games (Goals)
1911	Carlton	2 (0)
- ^{1} Playing statistics correct to the end of 1911.

Fred Marriott (14 February 1886 – 13 May 1954) was an Australian rules footballer who played with Carlton in the Victorian Football League (VFL).
