= Bill McVeigh =

Australian rules footballer

Personal information
- Full name: William Herbert McVeigh
- Born: 17 December 1881; Koroit, Victoria
- Died: 22 November 1951 (aged 69); Springvale, Victoria
- Original team: West Melbourne (VFA)

Playing career^{1}
Years	Club	Games (Goals)
1905	Carlton	5 (3)
- ^{1} Playing statistics correct to the end of 1905.

William Herbert McVeigh (17 December 1881 – 22 November 1951) was an Australian rules footballer who played with Carlton in the Victorian Football League (VFL).
