= Matt Crowe (Australian footballer) =

Australian rules footballer

Personal information
- Full name: Matthew Crowe
- Born: 1 September 1883; Carlton, Victoria
- Died: 15 May 1967 (aged 83); Ivanhoe, Victoria
- Original team: Carlton Juniors

Playing career^{1}
Years	Club	Games (Goals)
1903–04	Carlton	5 (6)
- ^{1} Playing statistics correct to the end of 1904.

Matthew Crowe (1 September 1883 – 15 May 1967) was an Australian rules footballer who played with Carlton in the Victorian Football League (VFL).
