= Alf Key =

Australian rules footballer

Personal information
- Full name: Alfred George Key
- Born: 14 November 1897; Carlton North, Victoria
- Died: 29 November 1977 (aged 80); Preston, Victoria
- Original team: Carlton District

Playing career^{1}
Years	Club	Games (Goals)
1920	Carlton	1 (0)
1921	Fitzroy	2 (0)
Total		3 (0)
- ^{1} Playing statistics correct to the end of 1921.

Alfred George Key (14 November 1897 – 29 November 1977) was an Australian rules footballer who played for the Carlton Football Club and Fitzroy Football Club in the Victorian Football League (VFL).
