= Jeff Trotman =

Australian rules footballer

Personal information
- Full name: Jeff Trotman
- Born: 7 December 1943
- Died: 29 December 1967 (aged 24)
- Original team: Ormond
- Height: 183 cm (6 ft 0 in)
- Weight: 80 kg (176 lb)

Playing career^{1}
Years	Club	Games (Goals)
1965	Carlton	3 (0)
- ^{1} Playing statistics correct to the end of 1965.

Jeff Trotman (7 December 1943 – 29 December 1967) was an Australian rules footballer who played with Carlton in the Victorian Football League (VFL).

He was killed in a car accident in 1967.
