= Alan Streeter =

Australian rules footballer

Personal information
- Full name: Alan Streeter
- Born: 30 September 1928
- Died: 21 December 2001 (aged 73)
- Original team: North Fitzroy YCW
- Height: 170 cm (5 ft 7 in)
- Weight: 70 kg (154 lb)
- Position: Rover

Playing career^{1}
Years	Club	Games (Goals)
1948–1950	Carlton	40 (35)
- ^{1} Playing statistics correct to the end of 1950.

Alan Streeter (30 September 1928 – 21 December 2001) was an Australian rules footballer who played with the Carlton Football Club in the Victorian Football League (VFL).
