= Wally Don =

Australian rules footballer

Personal information
- Full name: Walter George Don
- Born: 25 September 1891; Shepparton
- Died: 1 June 1957 (aged 65); Burwood, Victoria
- Original team: Teachers Training College

Playing career^{1}
Years	Club	Games (Goals)
1913	Carlton	1 (0)
1914	University	15 (0)
Total		16 (0)
- ^{1} Playing statistics correct to the end of 1914.

Walter George Don (25 September 1891 – 1 June 1957) was an Australian rules footballer who played with Carlton and University.

He later served in World War I.
