= Ernie McAlpine =

Australian rules footballer

Personal information
- Full name: Ernest Walter Gorton McAlpine
- Born: 11 February 1902; Flemington, Victoria
- Died: 1 June 1984 (aged 82); Ballarat, Victoria
- Original teams: Hume Weir, (O&MFL)
- Height: 165 cm (5 ft 5 in)
- Weight: 64 kg (141 lb)

Playing career^{1}
Years	Club	Games (Goals)
1924–1925	Carlton	14 (11)
- ^{1} Playing statistics correct to the end of 1925.

Ernest Walter Gorton McAlpine (11 February 1902 – 1 June 1984) was an Australian rules footballer who played with Carlton in the Victorian Football League (VFL).
