= Arthur Sleith =

Australian rules footballer

Personal information
- Full name: Arthur Joseph Sleith
- Born: 22 December 1917; Murtoa, Victoria
- Died: 17 December 2008 (aged 90)
- Original team: Preston
- Height: 183 cm (6 ft 0 in)
- Weight: 79 kg (174 lb)

Playing career^{1}
Years	Club	Games (Goals)
1942–1943	Carlton	5 (0)
- ^{1} Playing statistics correct to the end of 1943.

Arthur Joseph Sleith (22 December 1917 – 17 December 2008) was an Australian rules footballer who played for the Carlton Football Club in the Victorian Football League (VFL).
