= Wally Gibbins =

Australian rules footballer

Personal information
- Full name: Walter Edward Gibbins
- Born: 14 April 1890; Carlton, Victoria
- Died: 17 March 1964 (aged 73); Heidelberg, Victoria
- Original team: Williamstown
- Height: 173 cm (5 ft 8 in)
- Weight: 72 kg (159 lb)
- Position: Rover

Playing career^{1}
Years	Club	Games (Goals)
1913	Carlton	11 (10)
- ^{1} Playing statistics correct to the end of 1913.

Walter Edward Gibbins (14 April 1890 – 17 March 1964) was an Australian rules footballer who played with Carlton in the Victorian Football League (VFL).
