= Frank Triplett =

Australian rules footballer

Personal information
- Full name: Frank Arthur Triplett
- Born: 10 May 1885; Carlton, Victoria
- Died: 25 February 1967 (aged 81); Brighton, Victoria
- Original team: Carlton District
- Height: 170 cm (5 ft 7 in)
- Weight: 66.5 kg (147 lb)
- Position: Centre / Wing

Playing career^{1}
Years	Club	Games (Goals)
1912–15	Carlton	30 (5)
- ^{1} Playing statistics correct to the end of 1915.

Frank Arthur Triplett (10 May 1885 – 25 February 1967) was an Australian rules footballer who played with Carlton in the Victorian Football League (VFL).
