= Wally Powell =

Australian rules footballer

Personal information
- Full name: Walter Edmund Powell
- Born: 31 March 1878; Carlton, Victoria
- Died: 7 July 1945 (aged 67); Malvern, Victoria

Playing career^{1}
Years	Club	Games (Goals)
1900–02	Carlton	25 (0)
- ^{1} Playing statistics correct to the end of 1902.

Walter Edmund Powell (31 March 1878 – 7 July 1945) was an Australian rules footballer who played with Carlton in the Victorian Football League (VFL).
