= Bill Pettit =

Australian rules footballer

Personal information
- Full name: William Henry Pettit
- Born: 11 January 1881; Kew, Victoria
- Died: 17 December 1966 (aged 85); Preston, Victoria
- Original team: West Richmond

Playing career^{1}
Years	Club	Games (Goals)
1901	Carlton	15 (0)
- ^{1} Playing statistics correct to the end of 1901.

William Henry Pettit (11 January 1881 – 17 December 1966) was an Australian rules footballer who played with Carlton in the Victorian Football League (VFL).
