= Frank Mount =

Australian rules footballer, born 1903

Personal information
- Full name: Francis Patrick Mount
- Born: 17 March 1903; Fitzroy North, Victoria
- Died: 30 September 1989 (aged 86)
- Height: 163 cm (5 ft 4 in)
- Weight: 63 kg (139 lb)

Playing career^{1}
| Years | Club | Games (Goals) |
| 1927–28 | Carlton | 4 (0) |
- ^{1} Playing statistics correct to the end of 1928.

Francis Patrick Mount (17 March 1903 – 30 September 1989) was an Australian rules footballer who played with Carlton in the Victorian Football League (VFL).
