= John Tresize =

Australian rules footballer

Personal information
- Full name: John Tresize
- Born: 26 February 1953 (age 73); Bendigo
- Original team: Kennington
- Height: 180 cm (5 ft 11 in)
- Weight: 78 kg (172 lb)

Playing career^{1}
Years	Club	Games (Goals)
1977–1978	Carlton	14 (1)
- ^{1} Playing statistics correct to the end of 1978.

John Tresize (born 26 February 1953) is a former Australian rules footballer who played with Carlton in the Victorian Football League (VFL).
