= Jim Canfield =

Australian rules footballer

Personal information
- Full name: James Canfield
- Born: 13 March 1958 (age 68)
- Original team: St Vincent's
- Height: 191 cm (6 ft 3 in)
- Weight: 80 kg (176 lb)

Playing career^{1}
Years	Club	Games (Goals)
1977	Carlton	9 (2)
- ^{1} Playing statistics correct to the end of 1977.

Jim Canfield (born 13 March 1958) is a former Australian rules footballer who played with Carlton in the Victorian Football League (VFL).
