= Len Crone =

Australian rules footballer, born 1903

Personal information
- Full name: Len Crone
- Born: 2 January 1903
- Died: 18 February 1958 (aged 55)
- Original team: St Arnaud
- Height: 179 cm (5 ft 10 in)
- Weight: 79 kg (174 lb)

Playing career^{1}
Years	Club	Games (Goals)
1928, 1930	Carlton	7 (0)
- ^{1} Playing statistics correct to the end of 1930.

Len Crone (2 January 1903 – 18 February 1958) was an Australian rules footballer who played with Carlton in the Victorian Football League (VFL).
