= Rohan Burke =

Australian rules footballer

Personal information
- Full name: Rohan Burke
- Born: 24 July 1961 (age 65)
- Original team: Reservoir-Lakeside
- Height: 183 cm (6 ft 0 in)
- Weight: 75 kg (165 lb)
- Position: Defender

Playing career^{1}
Years	Club	Games (Goals)
1981–1986	Carlton	18 (9)
- ^{1} Playing statistics correct to the end of 1986.

Rohan Burke (born 24 July 1961) is a former Australian rules footballer who played with Carlton in the Victorian Football League (VFL). He is the son of Gerald Burke who played for Carlton in the 1950s.
