= George Wickens (Australian footballer) =

Australian rules footballer

Personal information
- Full name: George Henry Wickens
- Born: 7 March 1878; North Melbourne, Victoria
- Died: 14 June 1950 (aged 72); Arcadia, Queensland
- Original team: Carlton Imperials

Playing career^{1}
Years	Club	Games (Goals)
1902	Carlton	3 (2)
- ^{1} Playing statistics correct to the end of 1902.

George Henry Wickens (7 March 1878 – 14 June 1950) was an Australian rules footballer who played with Carlton in the Victorian Football League (VFL).
