= Harry McPherson (footballer) =

Australian rules footballer, born 1902

Personal information
- Full name: Henry John McPherson
- Born: 18 October 1902; Longwood, Victoria
- Died: 2 June 1968 (aged 65); Malvern, Victoria
- Original team: Fire Brigade FC

Playing career^{1}
Years	Club	Games (Goals)
1925–26	Carlton	8 (2)
1928	St Kilda	1 (0)
1929	Prahran (VFA)	8 (3)
- ^{1} Playing statistics correct to the end of 1928.

Henry John McPherson (18 October 1902 – 2 June 1968) was an Australian rules footballer who played with Carlton and St Kilda in the Victorian Football League (VFL).
