= Ray Quinn (footballer) =

Australian rules footballer

Personal information
- Full name: Ray Quinn
- Born: 24 December 1913
- Died: 3 February 1973 (aged 59)
- Original team: Carlton District
- Height: 175 cm (5 ft 9 in)
- Weight: 79.5 kg (175 lb)

Playing career^{1}
Years	Club	Games (Goals)
1933–35	Carlton	4 (1)
- ^{1} Playing statistics correct to the end of 1935.

Ray Quinn (24 December 1913 – 3 February 1973) was an Australian rules footballer who played with Carlton in the Victorian Football League (VFL).
