= Alf Hearnden =

Australian rules footballer

Personal information
- Full name: Alfred Henry Hearnden
- Born: 19 January 1874; North Melbourne, Victoria
- Died: 23 October 1951 (aged 77); Fitzroy, Victoria
- Original team: Fitzroy Crescent

Playing career^{1}
Years	Club	Games (Goals)
1899	Carlton	3 (0)
- ^{1} Playing statistics correct to the end of 1899.

Alfred Henry Hearnden (19 January 1874 – 23 October 1951) was an Australian rules footballer who played for the Carlton Football Club in the Victorian Football League (VFL).
