= Jimmy Gaynor =

Australian rules footballer

Personal information
- Full name: James Bernard Gaynor
- Born: 22 May 1875; Daylesford, Victoria
- Died: 20 November 1918 (aged 43); Auckland, New Zealand
- Original team: Carlton District

Playing career^{1}
Years	Club	Games (Goals)
1904	Carlton	1 (0)
- ^{1} Playing statistics correct to the end of 1904.

James Bernard Gaynor (22 May 1875 – 20 November 1918) was an Australian rules footballer who played with Carlton in the Victorian Football League (VFL).
