= Herbie Lowenthal =

Australian rules footballer

Personal information
- Full name: Harry Lowenthal
- Born: 12 August 1876; Carlton, Victoria
- Died: 1 February 1960 (aged 83); Kensington, Victoria
- Original team: Austral

Playing career^{1}
Years	Club	Games (Goals)
1897	Carlton	1 (0)
- ^{1} Playing statistics correct to the end of 1897.

Harry "Herbie" Lowenthal (12 August 1876 – 1 February 1960) was an Australian rules footballer who played with Carlton in the Victorian Football League (VFL).
