= Eric Cochran =

Australian rules footballer (1890–1969)

Personal information
- Full name: Eric Bennie Cochran
- Born: 18 June 1890; Ballarat, Victoria
- Died: 12 April 1969 (aged 78); Richmond, Victoria
- Original team: Golden Point
- Height: 184 cm (6 ft 0 in)
- Weight: 81 kg (179 lb)

Playing career^{1}
Years	Club	Games (Goals)
1912	Carlton	9 (1)
- ^{1} Playing statistics correct to the end of 1912.

Eric Bennie Cochran (18 June 1890 – 12 April 1969) was an Australian rules footballer who played with Carlton in the Victorian Football League (VFL). Born in Ballarat and recruited from Golden Point, he played nine consecutive matches during the later part of the 1912 season, all of which Carlton won. His last game was a semi-final against Geelong; he did not play the following week, when Carlton lost to Essendon in the preliminary final. Cochran holds the record for the most VFL/AFL career games without playing in a losing team.
