= Edgar Yeomans =

Australian rules footballer

Personal information
- Full name: Edgar Valentine Yeomans
- Born: 14 February 1886; Northcote, Victoria
- Died: 29 January 1971 (aged 84); Sandringham, Victoria
- Original team: Northcote

Playing career^{1}
Years	Club	Games (Goals)
1905	Carlton	3 (1)
- ^{1} Playing statistics correct to the end of 1905.

Edgar Valentine Yeomans (14 February 1886 – 29 January 1971) was an Australian rules footballer who played with Carlton in the Victorian Football League (VFL).
