= Maurie Pope =

Australian rules footballer

Personal information
- Full name: Maurice John Pope
- Born: 4 September 1936 (age 90)
- Height: 199 cm (6 ft 6 in)
- Weight: 98.5 kg (217 lb)

Playing career^{1}
Years	Club	Games (Goals)
1956–58	Carlton	7 (2)
- ^{1} Playing statistics correct to the end of 1958.

Maurice John Pope (born 4 September 1936) is a former Australian rules footballer who played with Carlton in the Victorian Football League (VFL).
