= Charles Rauber =

Australian rules footballer

Personal information
- Full name: Charles Frederick Rauber
- Born: 20 September 1890; Brunswick, Victoria
- Died: 9 March 1966 (aged 75); Brunswick West, Victoria
- Original team: Healesville

Playing career^{1}
Years	Club	Games (Goals)
1912	Carlton	1 (1)
- ^{1} Playing statistics correct to the end of 1912.

Charles Frederick Rauber (20 September 1890 – 9 March 1966) was an Australian rules footballer who played with Carlton in the Victorian Football League (VFL).
