= Charlie Tough =

Australian rules footballer

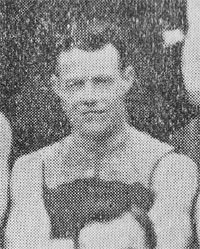
- Tough during his Carlton career

Personal information
- Full name: Charles James Guthrie Tough
- Born: 5 April 1880; Brunswick, Victoria
- Died: 28 June 1927 (aged 47); East Melbourne, Victoria
- Original team: Brunswick

Playing career^{1}
Years	Club	Games (Goals)
1902–05	Carlton	25 (2)
- ^{1} Playing statistics correct to the end of 1905.

Charlie Tough (5 April 1880 – 28 June 1927) was an Australian rules footballer who played with Carlton in the Victorian Football League (VFL).
