= George McGann =

Australian rules footballer

Personal information
- Full name: George Vivian McGann
- Born: 17 January 1881; Dennington, Victoria
- Died: 24 February 1947 (aged 66); Fitzroy, Victoria
- Original team: Coburg Juniors (VFA)

Playing career^{1}
Years	Club	Games (Goals)
1901	Carlton	4 (0)
- ^{1} Playing statistics correct to the end of 1901.

George Vivian McGann (17 January 1881 – 24 February 1947) was an Australian rules footballer who played with Carlton in the Victorian Football League (VFL).
