= Tom Dillon (Australian footballer) =

Australian rules footballer

Personal information
- Full name: Thomas Victor Dillon
- Born: 6 July 1920; Brisbane, Queensland
- Died: 17 August 2007 (aged 87)
- Original team: Bendigo
- Height: 175 cm (5 ft 9 in)
- Weight: 68 kg (150 lb)

Playing career^{1}
Years	Club	Games (Goals)
1943, 1946	Carlton	14 (8)
- ^{1} Playing statistics correct to the end of 1946.

Tom Dillon (6 July 1920 – 17 August 2007) was an Australian rules footballer who played with Carlton in the Victorian Football League (VFL).

Dillon served in the Australian Army during World War Two.
