= Noel Peverill =

Australian rules footballer, born 1907

Personal information
- Full name: Ralph Noel Peverill
- Born: 25 December 1907; Rushworth, Victoria
- Died: 21 October 1997 (aged 89); Perth, Western Australia
- Original team: Scotch College / University Blacks
- Height: 183 cm (6 ft 0 in)
- Weight: 81 kg (179 lb)

Playing career^{1}
| Years | Club | Games (Goals) |
| 1929 | Carlton | 1 (0) |
- ^{1} Playing statistics correct to the end of 1929.

Ralph Noel Peverill (25 December 1907 – 21 October 1997) was an Australian rules footballer who played with Carlton in the Victorian Football League (VFL).

Peverill played a single game for Carlton while studying dentistry at the University of Melbourne.

He later served in the Australian Army during World War II, rising to the rank of Lieutenant-Colonel.

Peverill later became the Director of the Perth Dental Hospital.
