= Bob Jacobson =

Australian rules footballer

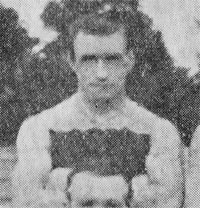
- Jacobson during his Carlton career

Personal information
- Full name: Robert James Isaac Jacobson
- Born: 15 November 1885; South Melbourne, Victoria
- Died: 20 June 1949 (aged 63); South Melbourne, Victoria
- Height: 170 cm (5 ft 7 in)
- Weight: 71 kg (157 lb)

Playing career^{1}
Years	Club	Games (Goals)
1903	Carlton	8 (0)
- ^{1} Playing statistics correct to the end of 1903.

Robert James Isaac Jacobson (15 November 1885 – 20 June 1949) was an Australian rules footballer who played with Carlton in the Victorian Football League (VFL).
