= Bill Dodds =

Australian rules footballer (1882–1934)

Personal information
- Full name: William Dodds
- Born: 23 April 1882; Collingwood, Victoria
- Died: 4 September 1934 (aged 52); Northcote, Victoria
- Original team: Albion United
- Height: 165 cm (5 ft 5 in)
- Weight: 55 kg (121 lb)

Playing career^{1}
Years	Club	Games (Goals)
1901	Carlton	1 (0)
- ^{1} Playing statistics correct to the end of 1901.

William Dodds (23 April 1882 – 4 September 1934) was an Australian rules footballer who played with Carlton in the Victorian Football League (VFL).
