= Paul Constance =

Australian rules footballer

Personal information
- Full name: Paul Constance
- Born: 11 May 1947 (age 79)
- Original team: Carlton Youth Foundation
- Height: 174 cm (5 ft 9 in)
- Weight: 67 kg (148 lb)
- Positions: Midfielder, Defender

Playing career^{1}
Years	Club	Games (Goals)
1966	Carlton	3 (0)
- ^{1} Playing statistics correct to the end of 1983.

Paul Constance (born 11 May 1947) is a former Australian rules footballer who played with Carlton in the Victorian Football League (VFL).
