= Arthur Ryan (footballer) =

Australian rules footballer

Personal information
- Full name: Arthur John Ryan
- Born: 1 October 1880; Carlton, Victoria
- Died: 4 August 1947 (aged 66); St Kilda, Victoria
- Original team: St Ignatius
- Height: 174 cm (5 ft 9 in)
- Weight: 72 kg (159 lb)

Playing career^{1}
Years	Club	Games (Goals)
1904	Carlton	4 (0)
- ^{1} Playing statistics correct to the end of 1904.

Arthur John Ryan (1 October 1880 – 4 August 1947) was an Australian rules footballer who played for the Carlton Football Club in the Victorian Football League (VFL).
