= Jim Tumilty =

Australian rules footballer

Personal information
- Full name: James Bertie Tumilty
- Born: 29 June 1886; Launceston, Tasmania
- Died: 28 August 1953 (aged 67); Launceston, Tasmania
- Original team: Mechanics
- Height: 165 cm (5 ft 5 in)
- Weight: 74 kg (163 lb)

Playing career^{1}
| Years | Club | Games (Goals) |
| 1910 | Carlton | 2 (1) |
- ^{1} Playing statistics correct to the end of 1910.

James Bertie Tumilty (29 June 1886 – 28 August 1953) was an Australian rules footballer who played with Carlton in the Victorian Football League (VFL).

He was born in Launceston, Tasmania on 29 June 1886. In 1915 he enlisted in the Australian Imperial Force and fought in the Gallipoli Campaign. He returned home after being injured by poison gas.
