= George Ferry =

Australian rules footballer

Personal information
- Full name: George Ferry
- Born: 8 August 1931
- Died: 6 February 2005 (aged 73)
- Original teams: St. Patrick's, East Melbourne
- Height: 179 cm (5 ft 10 in)
- Weight: 81 kg (179 lb)
- Position: Full Back

Playing career^{1}
Years	Club	Games (Goals)
1952–1961	Carlton	139 (7)
- ^{1} Playing statistics correct to the end of 1961.

Career highlights
- 1950 U/19 Best & Fairest

George Ferry (8 August 1931 – 6 February 2005) was an Australian rules footballer who played for the Carlton Football Club from 1952 to 1961.

Ferry was a "popular full-back during one of the bleakest periods in Carlton's history."
