= Wal McKenzie =

Australian rules footballer

Personal information
- Full name: Walter Alexander McKenzie
- Born: 18 February 1879; Lancefield, Victoria
- Died: 9 February 1931 (aged 51); Morwell, Victoria
- Original team: Carlton Imperials

Playing career^{1}
Years	Club	Games (Goals)
1902	Carlton	1 (0)
- ^{1} Playing statistics correct to the end of 1902.

Walter Alexander McKenzie (18 February 1879 – 9 February 1931) was an Australian rules footballer who played with Carlton in the Victorian Football League (VFL).
