= Richard Moran (Australian footballer) =

Australian rules footballer

Personal information
- Full name: Richard Herbert Moran
- Born: 2 May 1887; North Melbourne, Victoria
- Died: 11 October 1940 (aged 53); Melbourne, Victoria
- Original team: North Melbourne (VFA)
- Height: 171 cm (5 ft 7 in)
- Weight: 72.5 kg (160 lb)
- Position: Rover

Playing career^{1}
Years	Club	Games (Goals)
1912–13	Carlton	27 (34)
- ^{1} Playing statistics correct to the end of 1913.

Richard Herbert Moran (2 May 1887 – 11 October 1940) was an Australian rules footballer who played with Carlton in the Victorian Football League (VFL).
