= Max Ellis (footballer) =

Australian rules footballer

Personal information
- Full name: Max Ellis
- Born: 13 August 1933 (age 93)
- Original team: South Bendigo
- Height: 168 cm (5 ft 6 in)
- Weight: 67 kg (148 lb)

Playing career^{1}
| Years | Club | Games (Goals) |
| 1956 | Carlton | 2 (0) |
- ^{1} Playing statistics correct to the end of 1956.

Max Ellis (born 13 August 1933) was an Australian rules footballer who played with Carlton in the Victorian Football League (VFL).
