= Max Thomas (footballer, born 1930) =

Australian rules footballer

Personal information
- Full name: Max A. Thomas
- Born: 25 September 1930 (age 96)
- Original team: Brunswick YCW
- Height: 174 cm (5 ft 9 in)
- Weight: 72.5 kg (160 lb)

Playing career^{1}
Years	Club	Games (Goals)
1952–54	Carlton	24 (0)
- ^{1} Playing statistics correct to the end of 1954.

Max Thomas (born 25 September 1930) is a former Australian rules footballer who played for the Carlton Football Club in the Victorian Football League (VFL).
