= Max Thomas (footballer, born 1945) =

Australian rules footballer

Personal information
- Full name: John William Maxwell Thomas
- Born: 27 May 1947 (age 79); Traralgon
- Original team: Traralgon
- Height: 184 cm (6 ft 0 in)
- Weight: 78.5 kg (173 lb)

Playing career^{1}
Years	Club	Games (Goals)
1966	Carlton	2 (1)
- ^{1} Playing statistics correct to the end of 1966.

John William Maxwell "Max" Thomas (born 11 May 1945) is a former Australian rules footballer who played with for the Carlton Football Club in the Victorian Football League (VFL).
