= 1938 VFL grand final =

Grand final of the 1938 Victorian Football League season

1938 VFL Grand Final

Carlton	Collingwood
15.10 (100)	13.7 (85)
	1	2	3	4
CARL	3.2 (20)	7.6 (48)	11.9 (75)	15.10 (100)
COLL	3.1 (19)	4.4 (28)	8.5 (53)	13.7 (85)
- Date: 24 September 1938
- Stadium: Melbourne Cricket Ground
- Attendance: 96,486

The 1938 VFL grand final was an Australian rules football match contested between the Carlton Football Club and Collingwood Football Club, held at the Melbourne Cricket Ground on 24 September 1938. It was the 40th grand final of the Victorian Football League, staged to determine the premiers for the 1938 VFL season.

The match was won by Carlton by a margin of 15 points, the club's sixth VFL premiership victory. The match was attended by 96,486 spectators, setting a new record for the highest attendance at a football match in Australia which stood until 1956.

== Background ==
Carlton finished on top of the ladder for the 1938 season, having not relinquished first place since winning its first five matches. The club at one stage held an 11–1 record, before late season losses saw a final record of 14–4. Carlton qualified for the grand final by defeating Geelong in the second semi-final by 32 points. It was Carlton's first grand final appearance since 1932, and the club was attempting to win its first premiership since 1915. Carlton was in its first season under captain-coach Brighton Diggins, who had crossed from South Melbourne at the start of the year after having stood out of football in 1937 over a clearance dispute, and the club had flourished under Diggins' training and tactical regimen; the grand final was expected to be Diggins' last game, as he had announced his retirement prior to the semi-final, but he was later convinced to remain for another two years.

Collingwood had looked likely to miss the finals in August, but won its last four home-and-away matches to finish fourth with a 12–6 record, securing its finals berth with a nine-point victory over fifth-placed Melbourne in the final round. Collingwood had comfortable finals wins against Footscray in the first semi-final by 41 points and against Geelong in the preliminary final by 37 points to qualify for the grand final, and was entering on a six-game winning streak. It was the fourth of five consecutive grand final appearances for Collingwood between 1935 and 1939, the club having last won the 1935 and 1936 premierships.

The clubs had faced each other twice during the home-and-away season. In round 5, Carlton 19.16 (130) defeated Collingwood 17.12 (114) at Victoria Park after overcoming a 39-point half-time deficit, which at the time was the VFL record for a half-time deficit successfully overcome; in the aftermath, Collingwood captain Harry Collier was suspended for the rest of the season for striking Carlton's Jack Carney as they were leaving the field. In the return match in round 16, Collingwood 19.12 (126) defeated Carlton 14.17 (101) at Princes Park. Despite their respective ladder positions, Collingwood's better late-season form meant that Collingwood was widely considered favourite to win the grand final.

It was the third grand final between the clubs, the previous two coming in 1910 (won by Collingwood) and 1915 (won by Carlton).

== Attendance ==
The 1938 grand final was attended by 96,486 spectators (revised down from original reports of 96,834), setting a new record as the largest crowd to have witnessed a VFL match; the gate, also a new record, was £6778/9/3. At the time, the crowd was second only to the 1936 Melbourne Cup as the highest attended sports event in Australia's history. It was the second grand final played after the completion of the Melbourne Cricket Ground's original Southern Stand, and it remained the record for the ground under that configuration of grandstands; the record was broken at the 1956 VFL grand final, the first year after the opening of the Olympic Stand.

The ground was not large enough to accommodate the crowd comfortably – in fact, the health department had advised the maximum attendance at 84,950 after the 1937 record crowd of 88,540. The fence in front of the scoreboard collapsed under the weight of spectators before the game, gashing many spectators' hands, and as many as 5,000 spectators watched the game from inside the arena, mostly between the fence and boundary line but some spilling into the playing area. It was a warm day with a high of 69.6 °F (20.9 °C) and no clouds or rain, and 124 spectators were treated for heat-related illnesses.

It was a pro-Carlton crowd, sportswriters noting that the majority of the neutral spectators were cheering in Carlton's favour.

== Match summary ==
Carlton wore white knicks and used the Melbourne club rooms; Collingwood wore dark knicks and used the concrete stand club rooms. The seconds preliminary final was played as a curtain raiser, Footscray 13.14 (92) defeating Collingwood 12.15 (87) by five points. Carlton won the coin toss and kicked to the Jolimont end in the first quarter.

=== First quarter ===
The opening to the game was vigorous and hard and it was not until the 8th minute that the first score was registered: a behind to Carlton's Jack Hale. Collingwood controlled territory over the next ten minutes without score, eventually breaking through for its first goal from goalsneak Ron Todd after winning a free kick against Carlton full back Frank Gill. Carlton responded quickly, Mick Price gathering and kicking a goal from a dropped mark by Hale. After another behind to Collingwood, scores were level at 1.1 (7) apiece after 22 minutes.

Carlton's Mickey Crisp kicked the next goal from a long drop kick, before Todd kicked his second goal, again from a free kick against Gill. At this point, Diggins made a positional change for Carlton, swapping Jim Park onto Todd at full back and moving Gill to the back pocket. Each team kicked one further goal, Jack Wrout kicking from 60m on the run for Carlton, and Alby Pannam for Collingwood after another phase of play beginning from a free kick to Todd.

When the bell sounded, Carlton 3.2 (20) led Collingwood 3.1 (19), and the score was a fair reflection of the evenness of play. Collingwood centre half-back Marcus Boyall was the dominant player in the quarter, frequently repelling Carlton's attempts to advance the ball, and his strong play was part of why most of Carlton's scoring was forced from long range.

=== Second quarter ===
There was a delay to the start of the quarter as Carlton's Jack Carney replaced his boot. In a quarter played at slower pace, Des Fothergill kicked a behind from the opening bounce for Collingwood. Carlton then dominated territory over the next ten minutes, getting significant drive from Hale and Brighton Diggins in the ruck, and had many attempts at goal but only three behinds and many more missed opportunities; this included three marks and set shots missed by Ken Baxter, and several advances repelled by Collingwood defenders Don Balfour and Bervin Woods. Collingwood moved Phonse Kyne into the ruck to good effect, evening up the general play, and took the lead with a goal to Vin Doherty, who got onto the end of a passage of play from the wing.

Nearing half time, Diggins moved starting full back Frank Gill into the followers. Gill was dominant in this stint, and Carlton began to move the ball effectively by handball. This resulted in a quick run of goals to Carlton: first to Wrout, who kicked a goal on the run; then to Baxter from a mark in front of goal; then to Bob Green. Collingwood had two late opportunities, Fothergill missing from a free kick after a late hit which prompted umpire Bill Blackburn to issue a warning to the players; and Todd missing from a mark in the forward pocket. On the half time bell, Wrout kicked his third goal from a high mark over Balfour.

At half time, Carlton 7.6 (48) now led Collingwood 4.4 (28) by 20 points, having kicked four goals in the last five minutes of the quarter, after struggling to convert its opportunities early. Boyall was still Collingwood's best player at centre half-back, but his direct opponent Wrout had kicked three goals and was starting to get on top in the contest. Collingwood's smaller players were playing better than its bigger players, with Marcus Whelan the best in centre; but Hale was strong for Carlton had kept star 18-year-old rover Fothergill to only five disposals for the half.

=== Third quarter ===
The warm weather saw many players switch to sleeveless guernseys at half time. Collingwood made several positional changes, moving Woods into the ruck – which was something it often did very late in games to deliver a strong finish – moving Jack Knight to centre half forward, and moving Gordon Hocking to the back pocket

Carlton attacked from the opening bounce and Mick Price kicked a behind. Collingwood then kicked the opening goal of the quarter, Todd advancing the ball after winning a tight contest from Park and Knight finishing the goal. This was followed by several more Collingwood attacks, all defended by the Carlton half-backs. Carlton then rebounded and, after securing a free kick for out of bounds, Harry Vallence kicked a goal; the goal came on the third attempt, as two other successful attempts – a set shot and a play-on to Baxter – were brought back by the umpire. Carlton attacked again from the next centre bounce, and Price missed an easy shot, extending the margin to a game-high 23 points.

Doherty kicked the next goal for Collingwood, a 30-yard drop kick from an out of bounds free kick which saw him have to evade the spectators sitting on the arena. Over the next period, the two full forwards both generated several attempts: for Carlton, Baxter secured a couple of set shots from which he failed to score; for Collingwood, Todd won a couple of contests from Park, scoring a behind from one as Park hurried him and affected his kick, while with the other he squared the ball to Kyne who kicked a goal from the goal square, reducing the margin to eleven points.

Paul Schmidt kicked the next goal for Carlton, getting on the end of a clearance by Crisp, and Collingwood responded with Fothergill kicking a goal from a forward scramble. Collingwood's next three attacks were all repelled by strong marks to Diggins, before Carlton managed two late goals – one by Hale on the run, and one on the three-quarter time bell crumbed by Baxter in the goal square after an out of bounds free kick – to extend the margin back to 22 points.

At three-quarter time, Carlton 11.9 (75) led Collingwood 8.5 (53). Collingwood had the better of general play in the third quarter, with its small players now controlling the contests – especially Whelan, who was both winning in the centre and intercepting strongly as a loose man at half-back. However, Carlton had still won the quarter by two points, which was largely credited to strong defensive work by its half-backs, and particularly in limiting Todd's effectiveness by forcing him to play wide.

=== Final quarter ===
At three quarter time, Collingwood moved Todd to half-forward to bring him into the play. The quarter began with a sequence of three goals inside three minutes: to Fothergill, who received the ball from Todd in the middle, for Collingwood; to Schmidt from a scrimmage in the goal square for Carlton; and to Pannam with a goal from the wing for Collingwood. Two more Collingwood shots yielded only a behind, before Fothergill intercepted Gill's kick-off with a high mark over Hale and kicked a goal from 50yds. With seven minutes elapsed, the margin was now nine points. Wrout then kicked his fourth goal for Carlton after a high mark over Boyall to extend the margin back to 15 points. Collingwood made a substitution, Alan Williams going off the ground with cramp and replaced by Jack Carmody.

A ten-minute period of no scoring followed, both teams' defenders consistently keeping the scores out. For Carlton, Wrout took another high mark, but Vallence fumbled the pass. For Collingwood, Fothergill thought he had kicked a goal after a long run, but was called back for a free kick to Carlton for running too far. As the quarter progressed, Fothergill broke away from Hale to kick his fourth goal on the run from an angle. Then, in the 26th minute, Knight kicked to Todd, who took a spectacular mark and kicked a goal, to reduce the margin to only four points with four minutes remaining.

From the ensuing passage of play, Wrout won a free kick at half-forward, and kicked to the goal square where Hale took mark at the front of the pack in a severe crush, and kicked a goal to increase the margin to ten points. The next minute, Wrout again won the ball at half-forward, and kicked to Baxter who kicked the final goal of the game. A behind on the final bell to Fothergill narrowed the final margin to fifteen points, Carlton 15.10 (100) defeated Collingwood 13.7 (85).

Collingwood had nearly completed a come-from-behind victory, largely off the work of Fothergill who had dominated with ten kicks and three goals (with the potential fourth goal recalled for the running-too-far free kick) for the quarter. Wrout at half-forward and Carney in the middle were strong in the critical final minutes for Carlton.

=== Overall ===
Overall, the game was a fair standard but not a high standard, played tactically as a tight man-on-man encounter with few loose men or open plays. Carlton had used tactics and pace to cut off the short passing game for which Collingwood was known; and then leveraged its strength and superior marking – ultimately recording an 89–86 advantage in marks – to its advantage. It was a strenuous and gruelling match, although never unduly violent; Collingwood won the free kick count 59–47, including 14–8 for out of bounds in the last VFL game to feature last-touch out of bounds free kicks before the rule was removed in 1939.

Carlton ruck-rover Jack Hale was considered best on ground by sportswriters in the Age, the Sun News-Pictorial and the Australasian. Hale was still unwell from a cut he had suffered to his head in the semi-final – he had missed work over the previous fortnight and was reportedly still pale on the morning of the match – but he managed to give Carlton strong drive despite heavy attention in the packs, and kicked two goals including the steadying goal late in the final quarter. His contest with star Collingwood rover Des Fothergill was a critical match-up: Hale kept Fothergill to only ten kicks and minimal impact in the first three quarters, before Fothergill almost won the game with his brilliant final quarter – but overall, Hale was viewed to have won the match-up. Hale later described his relief that Fothergill had been moved forward for a rest in the second quarter, noting that he didn't believe he had the condition to cover him for four quarters as a follower.

Carlton half-forward Jack Wrout was the other outstanding player on the ground, named best in the Argus. Wrout's match-up with Collingwood half-back Marcus Boyall was another critical one: Boyall was Collingwood's best player early in the game at stopping Carlton's attacks and providing rebound; before Wrout gradually began to dominate the contest, finishing with four goals and setting up several more. The shift in control of the contest was such that Boyall recorded thirteen kicks in first half and only two in the second half.

For Carlton, other players considered among the best were: Jim Park, who kept league leading goalkicker Ron Todd to one goal in the 3½ quarters he played on him; Frank Gill, as a backman and follower; and Brighton Diggins in the ruck and backline, as well as for his tactical victory as coach. Defenders Don McIntyre, Frank Anderson, Jim Francis, Bob Chitty, Bob Green; and Mickey Crisp, Rod McLean and Jack Carney through the centre and wings were also singled out by sportswriters. First year full forward Ken Baxter was praised for his marking but derided for a particularly poor display of goal-kicking, which yielded 3.2 and many other shots missed out of bounds from close range; it was thought that Carlton would probably have won comfortably if not for Baxter's inaccuracy.

Collingwood's best were: centre and loose half-back Marcus Whelan, who was best among the small players and led all players on the ground with ten marks; Ron Dowling on the wing; the backline Don Balfour, Jack Regan and Bervin Woods, who defended strongly when Carlton controlled play; and defender Jack Ross, who thoroughly beat veteran Carlton forward Harry Vallence (one goal) in Vallence's final VFL match. Phonse Kyne, Jack Knight, Vin Doherty were also among the best.

== Teams ==
Both clubs named unchanged teams from their previous finals. There were three players doubtful with injury: Collingwood captain Albert Collier (standing in the role for suspended brother Harry) had a recurrence of his knee injury in the preliminary final; Collingwood centre half-back Marcus Boyall had missed work after injuring his back in the preliminary final; and Carlton rover Jack Hale had missed two weeks' work with the cut head he suffered in the second semi-final. All were declared fit, although Collier was lame and ineffective throughout the match and it was later considered an error to have played him.

The match was umpired by Bill Blackburn, the second of three grand finals he umpired in his career. Lancaster and O'Shea were boundary umpires, and Wetenhall and Treloar were goal umpires.

Carlton	Collingwood

Carlton
B:	3 Don McIntyre	21 Frank Gill	26 Jim Park
HB:	1 Frank Anderson	10 Jim Francis	6 Bob Chitty
C:	7 Jack Carney	12 Mickey Crisp	32 Bob Green
HF:	23 Paul Schmidt	28 Jack Wrout	22 Harry Vallence
F:	14 Rod McLean	4 Ken Baxter	30 Mick Price
Foll:	5 Brighton Diggins (c)	17 Harry Hollingshead	11 Jack Hale
Res:	31 Charlie McInnes		
Coach:	Brighton Diggins		

Collingwood
B:	30 Don Balfour	20 Jack Regan	29 Bervin Woods
HB:	22 Jack Ross	5 Marcus Boyall	10 Fred Froude
C:	8 Ron Dowling	28 Marcus Whelan	16 Leo Morgan
HF:	15 Phonse Kyne	32 Gordon Hocking	7 Vin Doherty
F:	14 Jack Knight	26 Ron Todd	18 Alby Pannam
Foll:	2 Albert Collier (c)	35 Alan Williams	9 Des Fothergill
Res:	5 Jack Carmody		
Coach:	Jock McHale		

== Scorecard ==
1938 VFL grand final
Saturday, 24 September	Carlton	def.	Collingwood	Melbourne Cricket Ground (crowd: 96,486)
3.2 (20); 7.6 (48); 11.9 (75); 15.10 (100)	Q1; Q2; Q3; Final	3.1 (19); 4.4 (28); 8.5 (53); 13.7 (85)	Umpires: Bill Blackburn
Wrout 4, Baxter 3, Hale 2, Schmidt 2, Crisp, Green, Price, Vallence	Goals	Fothergill 4, Todd 3, Doherty 2, Pannam 2, Knight, Kyne
Hale, Wrout, Park, Gill, Francis Anderson	Best	Whelan, Balfour, Woods, Regan, Ross, Dowling
Injuries	Williams (cramp), Collier (knee)

== See also ==
- 1938 VFL season
