= John Nicholls Medal =

Sports award

The John Nicholls Medal (formerly the Robert Reynolds Trophy from 1934 to 2003) is an Australian rules football award given to the player(s) adjudged best and fairest for the Carlton Football Club for the season. The voting system as of the 2017 AFL season, consists of four coaches giving each player a ranking from one to four after each match. Players can receive a maximum of 16 votes for a game.

John Nicholls was a champion ruckman who won the award five times from 1959 to 1967.

== Recipients ==
^	Denotes current player
+	Player won Brownlow Medal in same season

Season	Recipient(s)	Ref.
1929	Horrie Clover	
1930	—N/a	
1931	—N/a	
1932	—N/a	
1933	—N/a	
1934	Mickey Crisp	
1935	Jim Francis	
1936	Ansell Clarke	
1937	Don McIntyre	
1938	Mickey Crisp (2)	
1939	Frank Gill	
1940	Jim Francis (2)	
1941	Bob Chitty	
1942	Jim Mooring	
1943	George Gniel	
1944	Bob Chitty (2)	
1945	Ron Savage	
1946	Jack Howell	
1947	Bert Deacon+	
1947	Ern Henfry	
1948	Jack Howell (2)	
1949	Ern Henfry (2)	
1950	Arthur Hodgson	
1951	Jim Clark	
1952	Ollie Grieve	
1953	Ken Hands	
1954	Bill Milroy	
1955	John James	
1956	Doug Beasy	
1957	Bruce Comben	
1958	Bruce Comben (2)	
1959	John Nicholls	
1960	John James (2)	
1961	John James+ (3)	
1962	Sergio Silvagni	
1963	John Nicholls (2)	
1964	Gordon Collis+	
1965	John Nicholls (3)	
1966	John Nicholls (4)	
1967	John Nicholls (5)	
1968	Sergio Silvagni (2)	
1969	Garry Crane	
1970	Adrian Gallagher	
1971	Geoff Southby	
1972	Geoff Southby (2)	
1973	Peter Jones	
1974	Bruce Doull	
1975	Alex Jesaulenko	
1976	Trevor Keogh	
1977	Bruce Doull (2)	
1978	Trevor Keogh (2)	
1979	Mike Fitzpatrick	
1980	Bruce Doull (3)	
1981	Ken Hunter	
1982	James Buckley	
1983	Wayne Johnston	
1984	Bruce Doull (4)	
1985	Justin Madden	
1986	Craig Bradley	
1986	Wayne Johnston (2)	
1987	Stephen Kernahan	
1988	Craig Bradley (2)	
1989	Stephen Kernahan (2)	
1990	Stephen Silvagni	
1991	Justin Madden (2)	
1992	Stephen Kernahan (3)	
1993	Craig Bradley (3)	
1994	Greg Williams+	
1995	Brett Ratten	
1996	Stephen Silvagni (2)	
1997	Brett Ratten (2)	
1998	Fraser Brown	
1999	Matthew Allan	
2000	Scott Camporeale	
2000	Brett Ratten (3)	
2001	Anthony Koutoufides	
2002	Corey McKernan	
2003	Andrew McKay	
2004	David Teague	
2005	Anthony Koutoufides (2)	
2006	Lance Whitnall	
2007	Andrew Carrazzo	
2008	Chris Judd	
2009	Chris Judd (2)	
2010	Chris Judd+ (3)	
2011	Marc Murphy	
2012	Heath Scotland	
2013	Kade Simpson	
2014	Bryce Gibbs	
2015	Patrick Cripps^	
2016	Sam Docherty	
2017	Marc Murphy (2)	
2018	Patrick Cripps^ (2)	
2019	Patrick Cripps^ (3)	
2020	Jacob Weitering^	
2021	Sam Walsh^	
2022	Patrick Cripps+^ (4)	
2023	Jacob Weitering^ (2)	
2024	Patrick Cripps+^ (5)	
2025	George Hewett^	
2026	Sam Walsh^ (2)	

== Multiple winners ==
^	Denotes current player

Player	Medals	Seasons
John Nicholls	5	1959, 1963, 1965, 1966, 1967
Patrick Cripps^	5	2015, 2018, 2019, 2022, 2024
Bruce Doull	4	1974, 1977, 1980, 1984
Craig Bradley	3	1986, 1988, 1993
John James	3	1955, 1960, 1961
Chris Judd	3	2008, 2009, 2010
Stephen Kernahan	3	1987, 1989, 1992
Brett Ratten	3	1995, 1997, 2000
Bob Chitty	2	1941, 1944
Bruce Comben	2	1957, 1958
Mickey Crisp	2	1934, 1938
Jim Francis	2	1935, 1940
Ern Henfry	2	1947, 1949
Jack Howell	2	1946, 1948
Wayne Johnston	2	1983, 1986
Trevor Keogh	2	1976, 1978
Anthony Koutoufides	2	2001, 2005
Justin Madden	2	1985, 1991
Marc Murphy	2	2011, 2017
Sergio Silvagni	2	1962, 1968
Stephen Silvagni	2	1990, 1996
Geoff Southby	2	1971, 1972
Jacob Weitering^	2	2020, 2023
Sam Walsh^	2	2021, 2026

== See also ==
- Carlton best and fairest (list of Carlton Football Club best and fairest winners in the AFL Women's)
