= Frank Kelly (footballer, born 1910) =

Australian rules footballer (1910–1982)

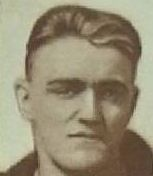

Personal information
- Full name: Francis James Kelly
- Born: 23 December 1910; Northcote, Victoria
- Died: 6 July 1982 (aged 71); Moe, Victoria
- Original team: Collingwood Juniors
- Height: 170 cm (5 ft 7 in)
- Weight: 71 kg (157 lb)

Playing career^{1}
Years	Club	Games (Goals)
1930–31, 1933	Collingwood	34 (8)
1934–36	Melbourne	31 (1)
1937–39	Essendon	30 (7)
1940–41	Port Melbourne (VFA)	24 (24)
1942–44	St Kilda	21 (28)
1945–46	Port Melbourne (VFA)	17 (10)
Total		157 (76)
- ^{1} Playing statistics correct to the end of 1946.

Francis James Kelly (23 December 1910 – 6 July 1982) was an Australian rules footballer who played for Collingwood, Melbourne, Essendon and St Kilda in the Victorian Football League (VFL).

== Family ==
The son of Michael Joseph Kelly (1892-1953), and Eleanor Mary Kelly (1892-1977), née Caroll, Francis James Kelly was born at Northcote, Victoria on 23 December 1910.

He married Thelma Veronica Mitchener (1909-2012) in 1934.

== Football ==
=== Collingwood (VFL) ===
Used on the wing or as a centreman, Kelly played his junior football with Collingwood and was promoted to their seniors in 1930. Despite playing the Preliminary Final, Kelly was omitted from the Collingwood team which won the 1930 VFL Grand Final.

=== Beechworth (O&KFL) ===
Cleared from Collingwood in May 1932, he spent the 1932 season at the Beechworth Football Club in the Ovens & King Football League as captain-coach.

=== Collingwood (VFL) ===
He returned to Collingwood in 1933.

=== Melbourne (VFL) ===
Kelly crossed to Melbourne in 1934, and played with them for three seasons.

=== Essendon (VFL) ===
Cleared from Melbourne to Essendon in 1937, he played with them for three seasons (1938-1939).

In 1938 he was reported on three occasions:

- 7 May 1938. In the match against Carlton, at Windy Hill on 7 May 1938 Carlton's ruckman Harry Hollingshead was reported for striking Kelly, and Kelly was reported for retaliating. The tribunal found both players guilty; and, making allowances for their previous clean records, Hollingshead was suspended for five weeks, and Kelly for three weeks
- 30 July 1938. In the match against Carlton, at Princes Park on 30 July 1938 Kelly was reported for kicking Carlton's Charlie McInnes. At the hearing on 2 August 1938, "because the evidence against Kelly was not conclusive, the tribunal decided to give him the benefit of the doubt, and dismissed the case".
- 6 August 1938. In the match against North Melbourne, at Windy Hill on 6 August 1938 North Melbourne's half-back flanker Roy Sitch was reported for striking Kelly, and Kelly was reported for retaliating. The tribunal found both players guilty, and they were each suspended for four matches.

=== Port Melbourne (VFA) ===
Cleared from Essendon in April 1940, he captain-coached Port Melbourne in the Victorian Football Association (VFA) for almost two years. Kelly was a strict disciplinarian as coach and opposed to the onfield violence that Port Melbourne was sometimes known for, and the Port Melbourne teams under his guidance became the best and most aggressive users of the throw pass, which the VFA had adopted. His time at Port Melbourne included the 1940 VFA premiership, and a minor premiership in 1941; but there was also off-field friction caused by Kelly's gambling addiction, and he was sacked and replaced as coach by Tommy Lahiff ahead of the 1941 finals. Port Melbourne won the 1941 premiership in Kelly's absence.

=== St Kilda (VFL) ===
In 1942 he returned to the VFL and joined his fourth club, St Kilda, for whom he kicked 21 goals that year and would captain in the 1944 season.

=== Port Melbourne (VFA) ===
In 1945 he returned to Port Melbourne, playing for two more seasons (1945-1946).

=== Yallourn North ===
Kelly later played at Yallourn North as captain-coach.

=== Moe ===
In 1954 he was coach of the Moe Football Club.

== Military service ==
He enlisted in the Second AIF in January 1942, served overseas in New Guinea, and was demobilized in October 1945.

== Death ==
He died at Moe, Victoria on 6 July 1982.
