= 1935 Brownlow Medal =

- Winner: Haydn Bunton (Fitzroy); 25 votes

The 1935 Brownlow Medal was the 12th year the award was presented to the player adjudged the fairest and best player during the Victorian Football League (VFL) home and away season. Haydn Bunton of the Fitzroy Football Club won the medal by polling twenty-five votes during the 1935 VFL season.

== Leading votegetters ==
	Player	Votes
1st	Haydn Bunton (Fitzroy)	25
2nd	Keith Forbes (Essendon)	17
3rd	Keith Shea (Carlton)	16
4th	Allan La Fontaine (Melbourne)	15
=5th	Jack Davis (St Kilda)	13
=5th	Jack Regan (Collingwood)	13
=5th	Dick Reynolds (Essendon)	13
8th	George Bennett (Footscray)	12
=9th	Vin Doherty (Collingwood)	11
=9th	Len Metherell (Geelong)	11
=9th	Jim Reid (South Melbourne)	11
=9th	Gordon Strang (Richmond)	11
