= 1936 VFL grand final =

Grand final of the 1936 Victorian Football League season

1936 VFL Grand Final

Collingwood	South Melbourne
11.23 (89)	10.18 (78)
	1	2	3	4
COLL	3.6 (24)	7.16 (58)	8.19 (67)	11.23 (89)
Sth. M	3.4 (22)	5.7 (37)	8.12 (60)	10.18 (78)
- Date: 3 October 1936
- Stadium: Melbourne Cricket Ground
- Attendance: 74,091

The 1936 VFL Grand Final was an Australian rules football game contested between the Collingwood Football Club and South Melbourne Football Club at the Melbourne Cricket Ground on 3 October 1936. It was the 38th annual Grand Final of the Victorian Football League, staged to determine the premiers for the 1936 VFL season. The match, attended by 74,091 spectators, was won by Collingwood by a margin of 11 points, marking that club's eleventh premiership victory.

== Background ==
This was the second successive year in which Collingwood and South Melbourne met in a premiership decider, with Collingwood having won the 1935 VFL Grand Final. South Melbourne had contested all of the previous four Grand Finals but had emerged victorious only once, winning the 1933 VFL Grand Final.

On the eve of the finals series star Collingwood full-forward Gordon Coventry was suspended for eight weeks for striking Richmond's Joe Murdoch. As it was the first time Coventry had been reported in seventeen seasons of VFL football, there was surprise at the severity of the suspension. Coventry announced his retirement, but returned, after much persuasion, for one more season.

== Teams ==
Collingwood	S. Melbourne

Collingwood
B:	Jim Crowe	Jack Regan	Bervyn Woods
HB:	Keith Fraser	Jack Ross	Fred Froude
C:	Leo Morgan	Marcus Whelan	Jack Carmody
HF:	Lou Riley	Phonse Kyne	Vin Doherty
F:	Alby Pannam	Ron Todd	Jack Knight
Foll:	Albert Collier	Percy Bowyer	Harry Collier (c)
Res:	Keith Stackpole		
Coach:	Jock McHale		

South Melbourne
B:	Jack Austin	Ron Hillis	Lin Richards
HB:	Jim Cleary	Jack Graham	Bill Faul
C:	Jim Reid	Len Thomas	Herbie Matthews
HF:	Syd Dineen	Laurie Nash	Owen Evans
F:	Maurie Johnson	Bob Pratt	Roy Moore
Foll:	Jack Bissett (c)	Dinny Kelleher	Austin Robertson
Res:	Charlie Pettiona		
Coach:	Jack Bissett		

== Match summary ==
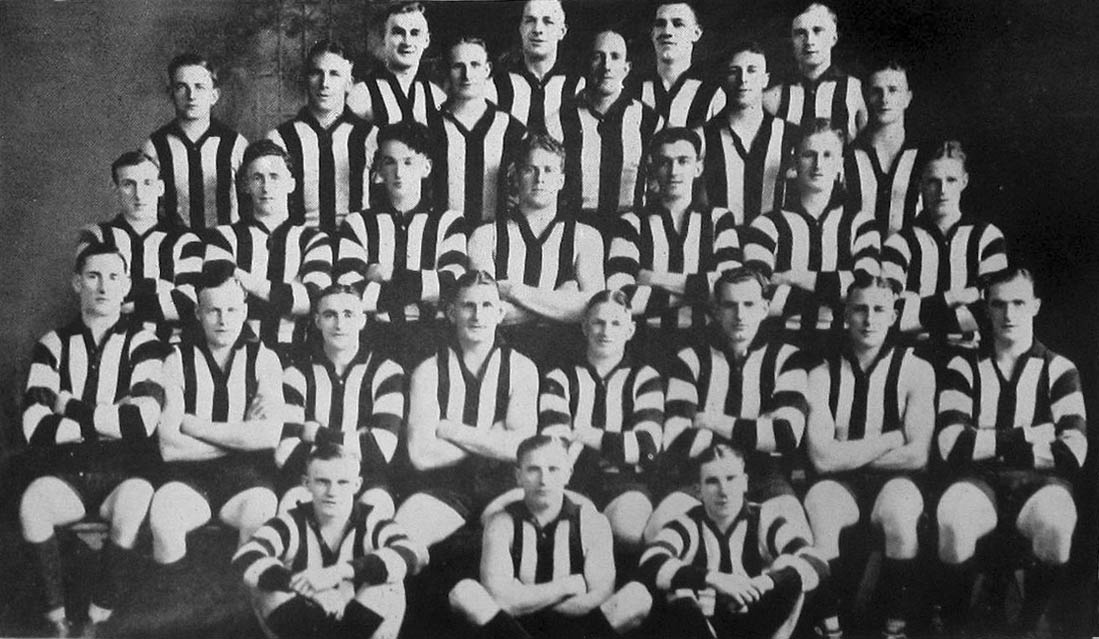
Collingwood FC, premiers

Collingwood opened brilliantly with a goal to Knight one minute after the opening bounce. Todd added another and a flurry of misses followed. At this stage, Collingwood was dominating the play, but then Nash finally scored South Melbourne's first goal before Robertson kicked their second.

== Epilogue ==
Collingwood would continue to feature prominently in the finals, but would lose the next two Grand Finals, to Geelong and Carlton respectively. They would not be premiers again until 1953. Having participated in the last four Grand Finals, South Melbourne would not participate in another season decider until the infamous 1945 bloodbath, and would have to wait until 2005, by which time the club had become known as the Sydney Swans, to taste premiership success.

== Score ==
Collingwood vs South Melbourne
2:30pm
Team	Q1	Q2	Q3	Final
Collingwood	3.6 (24)	7.16 (58)	8.19 (67)	11.23 (89)
South Melbourne	3.4 (22)	5.7 (37)	8.12 (60)	10.18 (78)
Venue:		Melbourne Cricket Ground		
Date and time:		3 October 1936		
Attendance:		74,091		
Umpires:		Blackburn		
Goal scorers:	Collingwood	5: Pannam; 4: Todd; 1: Knight, Kyne		
Goal scorers:	South Melbourne	3: Pratt; 2: Johnson, Moore; 1: Nash, Robertson, Evans		
Best:	Collingwood	Pannam, Whelan, Carmody, Kyne, Todd, Fraser, Doherty, Ross, Regan		
Best:	South Melbourne	Robertson, Cleary, Hillis, Richards, Nash, Evans, Moore		
Reports:		nil		
Injuries:		nil		

== See also ==
- 1936 VFL season

== Bibliography ==
- Atkinson, Graeme; Atkinson, Brant (2009). The Complete Book of AFL Finals. Australia: The Five Mile Press Pty Ltd. ISBN 978-1-74211-275-6.
