= Jim Park (footballer, born 1910) =

Australian rules footballer

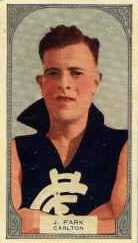

Personal information
- Full name: James William Park
- Born: 14 February 1910; Bendigo, Victoria
- Died: 9 February 1943 (aged 32); Wau, Territory of New Guinea
- Original teams: Dookie, Bass Valley
- Debut: 21 May 1932, Carlton vs. Hawthorn, at Princes Park
- Height: 183 cm (6 ft 0 in)
- Weight: 82 kg (181 lb)

Playing career^{1}
Years	Club	Games (Goals)
1932–1940	Carlton	128 (5)
- ^{1} Playing statistics correct to the end of 1940.

James William Park (14 February 1910 – 9 February 1943) was an Australian rules footballer who played with Carlton in the Victorian Football League (VFL) during the 1930s.

He died in action, in New Guinea, whilst serving with the Second AIF.

== Family ==
Born in Bendigo on 14 February 1910 to Dr. Alexander Park (1868–1929) and Ethel Marion Park (1881–1966), née Reilly, James William Park had three brothers, Alex, George, and Bob, and three sisters, Ethel, Hilda and Jean.

His father, a general practitioner, moved his practice from Bendigo (having originally practised in Tatura) to Moonee Ponds in 1919, in order to facilitate the education of his children: the boys attended Melbourne's Scotch College, which had not yet moved to Hawthorn and was still in East Melbourne, and the girls attended Melbourne's Presbyterian Ladies' College, also in East Melbourne.

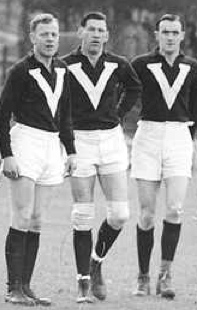
Jim Park, Jack Dyer of Richmond, and Phonse Kyne of Collingwood, at the Adelaide Oval, before the 1938 interstate match against South Australia

He married Marjorie Jean Steele (1913–?) on 26 October 1935, and they had one daughter, Joan Millicent Park (later Mrs Schinner).

== Education ==
He attended Scotch College from 1919 to 1926. He then went on to the Dookie Agricultural College, where he excelled in cricket, swimming, and football, as well as in his academic pursuits. In his second year, he was dux of his class, and in his final year he was second only to the dux. He graduated from Dookie with a Diploma of Agriculture at the end of 1930.

== Football ==
Recruited from Bass Valley Football Club, in Gippsland, he received his clearance to play with Carlton on 27 April 1932, and having played well for the Second XVIII on the preceding Saturday, he made his senior debut for Carlton at centre half-back, against Hawthorn, on 21 May 1932 (round four).

Park played in the back pocket and was a premiership player with Carlton in 1938. Noted for his performance in that grand final, he played 3½ quarters on prolific Collingwood full-forward Ron Todd, restricting Todd to only one further goal, after two he had kicked on starting full-back Frank Gill early in the match. In the same season, he was chosen to represent Victoria for the first time in his career.

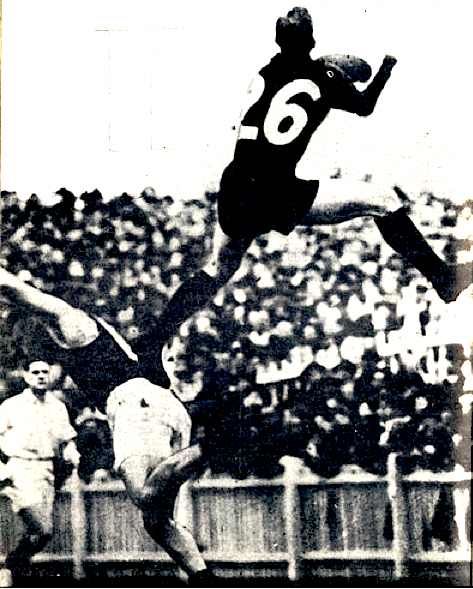
Jim Park soaring over "Tarzan" Glass, Princes Park, 12 May 1938

On Saturday, 28 May 1938, at Princes Park, in a match against Melbourne, which, although having more scoring shots, Carlton lost 14.18 (102) to 16.11 (107) – it was Carlton's first loss for the season – Park took one of the greatest marks of all time. Playing in the back pocket, in front of the Melbourne goal (having had only four yards of running space), he soared over the Melbourne forward Eric Glass, completing the mark. In the moment before the picture, Glass stands erect, Park's left heel is at the level of Glass's left shoulder, his left knee is well above Glass's right shoulder, his right leg extended for balance, and the ball is a short distance away.

== Military service ==
With his occupation listed as both "clerk" and "manager", Park enlisted in the Second AIF on 12 March 1941. On Tuesday, 18 March 1941, a senior team training night, Park attended Princes Park as a guest of the Carlton Football Club committee, and he "was presented with a cheque in recognition of his services to the club in the last nine years".

On 9 February 1943, he was killed in action while fighting Japanese forces with the 2/6th Infantry Battalion at the Battle of Wau in New Guinea.

Lieutenant Jim Park, shooting in the standing standing position a few yards from me, was shot through the heart and fell dead immediately ... He was a good soldier and a very popular officer, not least because he was such a good footballer, having been captain of a leading team in the big Melbourne league.

== See also ==
- List of Victorian Football League players who died on active service
