= Jack Hale (Australian footballer) =

Australian rules footballer and coach

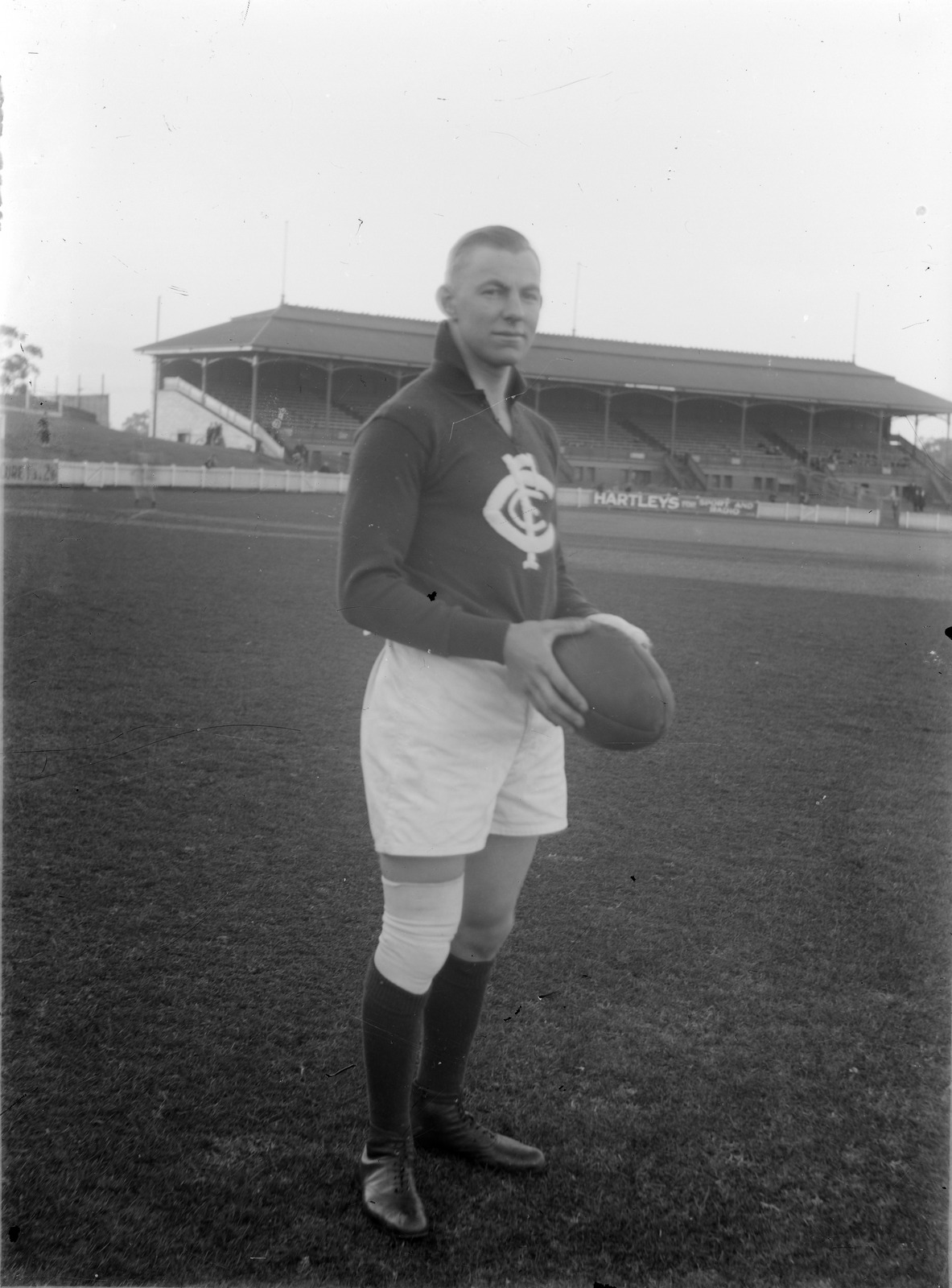

Personal information
- Full name: John Lachlan Hale
- Born: 2 January 1913; Carlton North, Victoria
- Died: 25 June 2001 (aged 88)
- Original team: Abbotsford Juniors
- Height: 175 cm (5 ft 9 in)
- Weight: 79 kg (174 lb)

Playing career^{1}
Years	Club	Games (Goals)
1933–1941	Carlton	123 (78)

Coaching career
Years	Club	Games (W–L–D)
1948–1949	South Melbourne	28 (9–19–0)
1952–1959	Hawthorn	146 (61–84–1)
Total		174 (70–103–1)
- ^{1} Playing statistics correct to the end of 1941.

John Lachlan Hale (2 January 1913 – 25 June 2001) was an Australian rules footballer who played with Carlton in the VFL during the 1930s before becoming a coach. He married Jean Margaret Reynolds in 1940 and they stayed married until his death.

== Playing career ==
Hale played in many positions during his career but was most notably a rover. He represented Victoria at the 1937 Perth Carnival as first rover, demoting the legendary Dick Reynolds to second rover. He turned down a £400 offer to transfer to Camberwell in 1938, and went on to star in Carlton's 15-point premiership win against Collingwood that year. Hale had suffered a serious cut to his head in the semi-final which had seen him miss work in the fortnight before the 1938 grand final, and by many accounts was still unwell on the day of the game and should have been deemed unfit to take the field; but he played nonetheless, and was considered by most sportswriters to be the best player on the ground, giving Carlton great drive from the ruck-rover position, significantly limiting the impact of star Collingwood rover Des Fothergill, and kicking two goals – including the steadying goal with less than four minutes remaining which put Carlton ten points ahead.

Unusually for his era, he sometimes took set shots with place kicks – albeit with limited success, his first place-kicked goal not coming until 1940. He famously earned the wrath of the Perth crowd during a windy 1939 interstate game, when he twice took place kicks from the back pocket during the final quarter, for the main purposes of wasting time as Western Australia tried to make best use of the gale; the umpire quickly put a stop to it by blowing time off, but one spectator threw dirt at him over the fence as he took the second of the kicks.

Hale broke his leg in a match against Richmond and the break caused him to retire in 1941, aged just 28. Hale was unable to walk for two years and spent seven months in Epsworth Hospital enduring operations and bone grafts.

== Coaching ==
Unable to play, Hale became the Reserve grade coach at Carlton for five seasons before moving to South Melbourne in 1948 to be an assistant coach under Bill Adams. Within months Adams was gone so Hale became non playing coach at South Melbourne, spending two seasons at the club.

In 1950 he was appointed an assistant coach to Bob McCaskill at Hawthorn. He was dismayed at the attitude at the club when he first arrived. "By being cruel, crude and brutal I bullied the players into getting self-esteem and respect for their colours" he once told a reporter.

When McCaskill's health started to fail he was appointed caretaker coach in 1952. In June 1952 McCaskill died and Hale was formally appointed for the next three years. Hale became the first man to coach Hawthorn to more than 100 matches, and had the distinction of leading them to their first ever finals appearance in 1957. He stepped down at the end of 1959 when he believed that his successor John Kennedy was ready to take over.

Kennedy often credited Hale as being the one who laid the foundations of the 1961 premiership side. "Jack Hale taught Hawthorn to hate defeat," said Kennedy. "When I went to Hawthorn," Hale said, "I took the Carlton spirit with me. I wanted to create a Hawthorn spirit by encouraging the local kids to become involved. I suppose it was the start of the ‘family club’ tradition."

Hale had a position on the VFL Umpires Appointment Board 15 years. He was a Life Member of the Carlton Football Club, the Hawthorn Football Club, and the AFL. He died on 25 June 2001 aged 88.
