= Jack Francis =

Australian rules footballer, born 1908

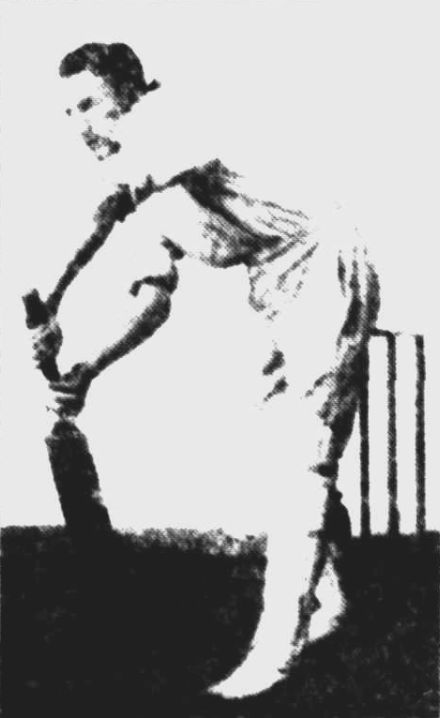
- Born: John Charles Francis; 22 June 1908; Hawthorn, Victoria
- Died: 6 July 2001 (aged 93); Camberwell, Victoria
- Height: 170 cm (5 ft 7 in)
Australian rules football career
Playing career^{1}
Years	Club	Games (Goals)
1923	Hawthorn (VFA)	1 (0)
1926	Hawthorn	6 (8)
1929	Brighton (VFA)	
Total		7 (8)
- ^{1} Playing statistics correct to the end of 1930.
- Cricket career

Cricket information
- Batting: Right-handed

Domestic team information
- Years: Team
- 1932/33: Victoria

Career statistics
Competition	First class
Matches	3
Runs scored	186
Batting average	46.50
100s/50s	1/0
Top score	135
Catches/stumpings	1/–
- Source: Cricinfo, 21 April 2023

John Charles Francis (22 June 1908 – 6 July 2001) was an Australian sportsman who played first-class cricket for Victoria and Australian rules football with Hawthorn in the Victorian Football League (VFL).

== Family ==
The son of Henry Walter Francis (1883–1964) and Sarah Victoria Francis, née Jackson (1884–1929), John Charles Francis was born in Hawthorn on 22 June 1908 and educated at Melbourne High School.

His younger brothers Jim and Syd also played VFL football.

In November 1933 Jack Francis married Jean Millicent Allison at St John's Church of England in Camberwell.

== Football ==
Francis began his sporting career in 1923 when he played for Hawthorn, then in the Victorian Football Association, while still a schoolboy. In 1926 he again played senior football with Hawthorn, who were now in the VFL. He played six games that year, kicking two goals in his debut, against Collingwood, for whom future club great Harry Collier was also debuting. One of his teammates that day was his uncle, Jim Jackson. He later briefly played for Brighton in the VFA after transferring there in 1929.

== Cricket ==
Francis did not continue as a footballer, instead concentrating on cricket, and in the 1932/33 season made his first appearance with Victoria. Opening the batting, Francis scored 135 to help the Victorians draw with Tasmania. He played two further first-class matches, both later in the season and as an opener, but did not make any major contributions for his team.

== Death ==
John Charles Francis died on 6 July 2001 and was cremated at Springvale Botanical Cemetery.
