= Jack Wrout =

Australian rules footballer, born 1911

Personal information
- Full name: John Everett Wrout
- Born: 8 October 1911; West Melbourne, Victoria
- Died: 16 June 1981 (aged 69); St Vincent's Hospital, Fitzroy, Victoria
- Original team: West Melbourne CYMS
- Height: 180 cm (5 ft 11 in)
- Weight: 85 kg (187 lb)

Playing career^{1}
Years	Club	Games (Goals)
1931–1936	North Melbourne	53 (52)
1936–1944	Carlton	130 (267)
Total		183 (319)
- ^{1} Playing statistics correct to the end of 1944.

John Everett Wrout (8 October 1911 – 16 June 1981) was an Australian rules footballer who played in the Victorian Football League (VFL).

== Family ==
The son of Herbert Wrout (1884-1950), and May Victoria Wrout (1888-1953), née Hay, John Everett Wrout was born at West Melbourne, Victoria on 8 October 1911.

He married Nancy Jean Ryan (1916-2008), the sister of Reg Ryan, in 1935. They had two children: John, and Nancy May (1937-), later Mrs. Vincent Patrick Heffernan.

== Education ==
He was educated at St Joseph's Christian Brothers' College, North Melbourne.

== Football ==
=== North Melbourne (VFL) ===
Wrout, "a defender of pace and determination" was recruited for the North Melbourne Football Club, in the VFL, "from the C.Y.M.S. competition" in 1931, and played his first match for the North Melbourne First XVIII against Melbourne, at the M.C.G., on 5 September 1931.

I [spoke] with the "local boy", who has "made good", Jack Wrout, who, playing his second [sic] season of senior football, has been chosen to journey with the Victorian Carnival team to Sydney. Jack is proving a star half-forward for the blue and whites, and has been one of the side's outstanding players this season.
Jack was educated at the Christian Brothers' College, North Melbourne, but, unfortunately, his services as a footballer were denied the school eighteen. He broke his leg while playing with the primary school, and was not able to play the game again until two years after he left the college, when he stripped for the C.Y.M.S. team at West Melbourne.
As a centre half-back with this side, he attracted the attention of the North Melbourne "scouts", who invited him to train with the Northerners at the commencement of last season [1932]. His form, however, though promising, did not warrant his being played consistently throughout the year . . . but this season [1933] he has definitely "come to stay". — F. Keith Manzie, Table Talk, 20 July 1933.

On 10 July 1933, along with team-mate Charlie Gaudion, Wrout was selected as one of the (obligatory) two men from the North Melbourne club in the VFL's representative team for the Eighth Australian National Football Carnival, to be held, in Sydney in the first two weeks of August; and it was speculated that he would be part of the First XVIII, and play on the half-forward flank. Ten minutes into North Melbourne's next home-and-away match, against Fitzroy, at the very muddy and heavy Brunswick Street Oval, on 15 July 1933, Wrout, who was playing at centre half-forward, went down in a crush of players and broke his left leg. His injury meant that he was unable to play for Victoria, and his (North Melbourne) place in the team was taken by Jim Adamson.

J. Wrout, the North Melbourne half-forward, who will miss a trip to Sydney with the Victorian Football League's carnival team because he broke his leg in the North Melbourne—Fitzroy match on Saturday, is still wondering how it happened.
"I can't get over it", he said today. "It was the simplest accident imaginable. I just went up for a mark, slipped and fell, and could hardly believe it when I found I couldn't rise, because my leg was broken. Nobody even touched me while I was in the air.
"I have had hundreds of falls like that playing football, and scores of really hard knocks, but not anything really serious before. It is almost laughable to think that I stood up to all those knocks, only to go down in this fashion.
"It hurts to miss a trip to Sydney. That's the worst of this accident."
. . .
Five years ago, when at school, Wrout broke his arm and leg when he fell three storeys from a building in course of construction to a cobble-stone pavement. That accident stopped his football for nearly three years. Now he may miss another year. — The Herald, 17 July 1933.

In 1934, he was the only North Melbourne player selected in the VFL representative team that played against South Australia on 16 June 1934; and, in 1935, he was selected as part of the VFL representative team that played against a combined Bendigo team on 3 August 1935.

=== Carlton (VFL) ===
In 1936, he was transferred to the Carlton Football Club, in exchange for Alan Crawford. He made his debut for Carlton in round 12, 1936, and went on to play in 130 senior games, and score 266 goals over nine seasons (1936 to 1944).

Wrout missed most of the 1938 season with a knee injury suffered in round 5, but returned in the final home-and-away round and played throughout the finals. Playing at centre half-forward, he was considered among the best on the ground in Carlton's 1938 VFL grand final victory against Collingwood, kicking four goals. It was the only premiership of Wrout's VFL career.

Wrout broke his leg, just above the ankle, in the third quarter of his 97th consecutive game with Carlton, the final game of the 1944 home-and-away season. The injury forced the almost 33 year-old Wrout into retirement.

== Carlton Football Club ==
Wrout later had a long administrative career at Carlton, serving as Vice-President and chairman of selectors (1958-1978). He was elected into the Carlton Hall of Fame in 2016.

== Death ==
He died at St Vincent's Hospital, in Fitzroy, Victoria, on 16 June 1981.
