= Three of the Players =

1953 painting by John Brack

- Artist: John Brack
- Year: 1953
- Medium: oil on canvas
- Dimensions: 38.5 cm × 84.0 cm (15.2 in × 33.1 in)
- Location: Private collection

Three of the Players is a 1953 painting by Australian artist John Brack. The painting depicts three Australian rules footballers from the Collingwood Football Club. The players are thought by some to be Lou Richards, Jack Regan and Phonse Kyne. However, Brack's widow, Helen, was of the opinion that they are not recognisable individuals but "stereotyped characters".

The painting has been described as "Brack's unique comment on canvas observing the deeper but universal emotions of Australian Rules Football the national game". The work has also been described as the "most significant sport painting by Brack and the most significant artwork to depict the Collingwood Football Club."

Seeking verities beyond the everyday suburban fringe, Brack wittily likens the three Collingwood football personalities in their black and white striped jumpers to three types of players as present in the ages of man. The bulk of youth looks observantly to the older player, eye-lined with experience, while dogged determination is captured in the maturity of the manly profile.

— Deutscher and Hackett,

First exhibited in the Peter Bray Gallery in 1953, for more than 40 years the painting hung in the South Yarra home of Australian architect Robin Boyd. In 2010, it sold for A$900,000 to a private collector.
