= William Milroy =

William Milroy may refer to:

- William Milroy (badminton), Canadian badminton player
- William A. Milroy, Canadian general
- Bill Milroy, Australian rules footballer
