= Gordon Hocking =

Australian rules footballer, born 1919

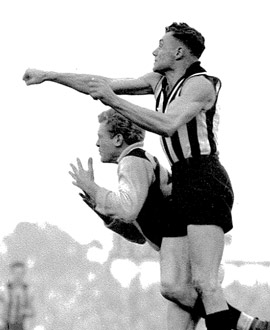
- Hocking (right) in the early 1940s

Personal information
- Full name: Gordon Charles Hocking
- Born: 12 August 1919; South Melbourne, Victoria
- Died: 24 March 1986 (aged 66); Balwyn, Victoria
- Original team: Chelsea
- Height: 178 cm (5 ft 10 in)
- Weight: 81 kg (179 lb)

Playing career^{1}
Years	Club	Games (Goals)
1938–1952	Collingwood	171 (80)
- ^{1} Playing statistics correct to the end of 1952.

Gordon Charles Hocking (12 August 1919 – 24 March 1986) was an Australian rules footballer who played for Collingwood in the Victorian Football League (VFL).

== Football ==
Hocking was primarily a knock ruckman but could also play most positions around the ground. He made his debut at Collingwood in the 1938 VFL season and was a losing Grand Finalist in his first two seasons. In 1950 he was appointed club captain and he remained in the role the following year, leading Collingwood to a Preliminary Final which they lost to Essendon by two points. Hocking was a regular interstate representative for Victoria and starred at the 1950 Brisbane Carnival. That year he was named as a half back flanker in the Sporting Life Team of the Year.

Hocking retired during the 1952 VFL season, the last remaining pre-World War II VFL player.

== Military service ==
He served overseas with the Second AIF.

== Sources ==
- Bolfo, Tony, "200 Club push for 'Mulga', Baxter and Bob", Carlton Football Club, 14 March 2017.
- Holmesby, R. and Main, J. (2007) The Encyclopedia of AFL Footballers, 7th ed, Melbourne: Bas Publishing.
- Piesse, K. (2011) Great Australian Football Stories, The File Mile Press: Scoresby, Victoria. ISBN 9781743467572.
- World War Two Nominal Roll: Corporal Gordon Charles Hocking (VX82888), Department of Veterans' Affairs.
- World War Two Service Record: Corporal Gordon Charles Hocking (VX82888), National Archives of Australia.
