= Syd Dineen =

Australian rules footballer, born 1914

Personal information
- Full name: Sydney Alfred Dineen
- Born: 7 November 1914; Greensborough, Victoria
- Died: 10 November 1989 (aged 75)
- Original team: Preston
- Height: 174 cm (5 ft 9 in)
- Weight: 74 kg (163 lb)

Playing career^{1}
Years	Club	Games (Goals)
1935–1937	South Melbourne	28 (26)
- ^{1} Playing statistics correct to the end of 1937.

Sydney Alfred Dineen (7 November 1914 – 10 November 1989) was an Australian rules footballer who played with South Melbourne in the Victorian Football League (VFL).

Dineen originally came from Preston and played three seasons for South Melbourne. He was on a half-forward flank in the 1936 VFL Grand Final, which South Melbourne lost to Collingwood.

His younger brother, Ken, also played for South Melbourne.
