= Don Balfour =

Australian rules footballer

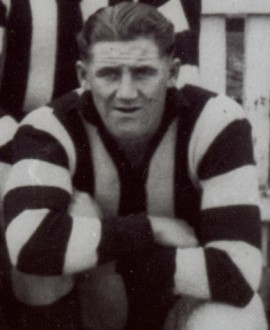
- Balfour in 1944

Personal information
- Full name: Donald William Balfour
- Born: 11 November 1918
- Died: 21 April 2008 (aged 89)
- Original team: Gold Street P.S
- Height: 175 cm (5 ft 9 in)
- Weight: 73 kg (161 lb)

Playing career^{1}
Years	Club	Games (Goals)
1938–1945	Collingwood	71 (29)
1945–1946	Richmond	8 (1)
Total		79 (30)
- ^{1} Playing statistics correct to the end of 1946.

Donald William Balfour (11 November 1918 – 21 April 2008) was an Australian rules footballer who played with Collingwood and Richmond in the Victorian Football League (VFL).

Balfour made grand final appearances in each of his first two seasons and finished on the losing team in both. A defender, he was in back pocket for the 1938 VFL Grand Final and on a half back flank in the 1939 Grand Final. His participation was limited during the war, he played just two games in 1941 and didn't play any senior football in 1942.

He spent the second half of the 1945 season at Richmond and remained with the club in 1946. The following year he was captain-coach of Launceston club City in the Northern Tasmanian Football Association and guided them to the grand final, but again suffered defeat.
