= Brighton Diggins =

Australian rules footballer (1906–1971)

Personal information
- Full name: Brighton John Diggins
- Born: 26 December 1906; Victoria Park, Western Australia
- Died: 14 July 1971 (aged 64); Mount Eliza, Victoria
- Height: 183 cm (6 ft 0 in)
- Weight: 92 kg (203 lb)
- Positions: Key position, ruckman

Playing career^{1}
Years	Club	Games (Goals)
1927–1931	Subiaco	87
1932–1937	South Melbourne	65 (21)
1938–1940	Carlton	31 (6)

Coaching career^{3}
Years	Club	Games (W–L–D)
1935	South Melbourne	2 (2–0–0)
1938–1940	Carlton	56 (38–18–0)
Total		58 (40–18–0)
- ^{1} Playing statistics correct to the end of 1940.^{3} Coaching statistics correct as of 1940.

Career highlights
- Subiaco Team of the Century: centre half back; South Melbourne premiership player 1933; Carlton premiership captain-coach 1938; Carlton captain 1938–1940

Brighton John Diggins (born Bryton John Diggins, 26 December 1906 – 14 July 1971) was an Australian rules footballer in the West Australian Football League (WAFL) and Victorian Football League (VFL).

== Family ==
The son of Arthur Oswald Diggins (1878–1933) and Lucy Dolphin "Dolly" Diggins (1886–1945), née Mountain, Diggins was born on 26 December 1906. He married Amanda Eileen Murphy in 1928. He died on 14 July 1971.

== Subiaco ==
Diggins began his senior football career at the Subiaco Football Club in the West Australian Football League in 1927. A key position player and ruckman, Diggins was a strong mark and a fast runner, and by 1930, he was considered to be the finest key position player in Australia. He played with Subiaco from 1927 to 1931, and played 88 matches for the Lions.

== South Melbourne ==
In 1932, during the Great Depression, Diggins moved to Victoria to play for the South Melbourne Football Club in the VFL.

Diggins was one of several Subiaco players who joined South Melbourne in the early 1930s, including Johnny Leonard (who was coaching), Bill Faul and John Bowe, with the promise of immediate, long-term, secure, paid employment outside of football within the (137 store) grocery empire of the South Melbourne president, South Melbourne Lord Mayor, and Member of the Victorian Legislative Council, Archie Crofts.

The influx of players from interstate became known as South Melbourne's "Foreign Legion", and helped South's on-field performance significantly. Diggins won one premiership with South Melbourne in 1933, and played there until 1936.

At the start of 1937, dissatisfied with his treatment at South Melbourne, Diggins sought and was refused a clearance to the Carlton Football Club. As the season began, Diggins stood out of football, declining to train or play for South Melbourne; he explored options to return to Western Australia and serve as coach – either playing-coach with a clearance, or non-playing coach without – for several WANFL sides, before returning to Victoria and again unsuccessfully seeking clearance to Carlton. Eventually, Diggins stood out of football for the entire season over the dispute.

== Carlton ==
At the start of 1938, Carlton and South Melbourne finally came to an agreement and Diggins was cleared to Carlton. He was immediately appointed captain-coach, and flourished, leading the team to the 1938 premiership. His leadership and coaching style, and in particular, new and innovative training programs he set up for the players, were seen as critical to the club's 1938 success; and he became a highly regarded tactician, with several of his timely positional moves seen as pivotal to Carlton's upset win in the 1938 grand final.

Diggins had announced his retirement prior to the 1938 grand final, but was later convinced to play on. He played two more seasons with Carlton, playing his last senior game in round 4, 1940 against Melbourne, when he suffered a serious injury to a knuckle. Due to that injury, and number of illnesses, he did not play for Carlton again that year, on medical advice; however he did continue as non-playing coach until the end of the 1940 season (round 18: 31 August 1940).

== Military service ==
Having earlier intimated an inclination to enlist in the R.A.A.F., once Carlton's 1940 VFL season had finished, Diggins enlisted in the Second AIF (in September 1940).

"Diggins retired [from football] in order to join the armed forces. However, after just three months he was discharged on medical grounds when it was felt that his ankle, which he had injured in a match in 1934, would be unable to withstand the rigours of infantry training."

He re-enlisted in 1942; and, as Staff Sergeant Diggins, he took an active part in the training of commandos at the Army Physical and Recreational Training School (P. & R.T.) in Frankston.

== Frankston ==
In 1947, he was appointed non-playing coach of Frankston Football Club. In September 1947, when an injured player was unable to return to the field after half-time, he "took the field [and] received a great ovation from the Frankston supporters. Diggins is the biggest man seen in Peninsular football for a long time. "Football News" put his weight down at 17 stone [viz., 108 kg]". and, in the following season (1948), aged 41, he made another comeback, in which "he played inspiring football and was largely responsible for his side's two-goal win". He coached Frankston for three seasons (1947–1949).

== The Argus ==
In 1950, he became a football reporter for The Argus.

== Subiaco Team of the Century ==
Diggins was named as the centre half-back in the Subiaco Team of the Century.
