= Owen Evans (Australian footballer) =

Australian rules footballer

Personal information
- Full name: Kenneth Owen Evans
- Born: 5 December 1916; St Kilda, Victoria
- Died: 19 November 1972 (aged 55)
- Original team: Wesley College
- Height: 183 cm (6 ft 0 in)
- Weight: 79 kg (174 lb)

Playing career^{1}
Years	Club	Games (Goals)
1935–1941	South Melbourne	64 (95)
- ^{1} Playing statistics correct to the end of 1941.

Kenneth Owen "KO" Evans (5 December 1916 – 19 November 1972) was an Australian rules footballer who played with South Melbourne in the Victorian Football League (VFL).

Evans, who excelled in athletics while at Wesley College, played 64 games for South Melbourne, in seven seasons. The Wesley College recruit was on a half forward flank for South Melbourne in the 1936 VFL Grand Final loss to Collingwood. His career best goal tally was eight goals, which he got against Hawthorn at Lake Oval in 1940. He also played for Victorian Football Association club Coburg, crossing without a clearance during the 1941 season during the throw-pass era, and he later played for the City club in Tasmania.
