= Mickey Crisp =

Australian rules footballer, born 1908

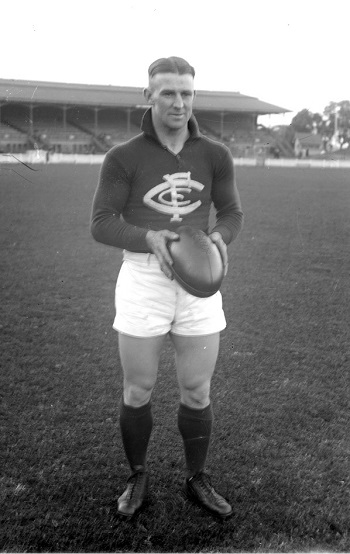
- Crisp during his Carlton career

Personal information
- Full name: Cresswell William Crisp
- Born: 12 May 1908
- Died: 15 April 2001 (aged 92)
- Original teams: Wedderburn, Sandhurst
- Debut: Round 1, 1931, Carlton vs. Richmond, at Princes Park
- Height: 173 cm (5 ft 8 in)
- Weight: 81 kg (179 lb)

Playing career^{1}
Years	Club	Games (Goals)
1931–1941	Carlton	183 (281)
- ^{1} Playing statistics correct to the end of 1941.

Career highlights
- 1930 - BFL Best & Fairest; 1930 - BFL - 100 goals; 1930 - BFL Premiership. Sandhurst; 1934 - Carlton - Best & Fairest; 1934 & 1938 - Leading Carlton goalkicker

Cresswell William 'Mickey' Crisp (12 May 1908 – 15 April 2001) was an Australian rules footballer who debuted with Carlton in the VFL in the 1931 season after winning the 1930 Bendigo Football League's inaugural best and fairest award, the Fred Wood Medal, with Sandhurst, a premiership with Sandhurst and kicking 100 goals in 1930.

He was a premiership player in 1938 and regular Victorian interstate representative.

Crisp played most of his career as a centreman but started in the forward line, kicking a career-high 53 goals in 1932. He won the inaugural Carlton best and fairest award in 1934, topping the club's goalkicking in the same season. He won the award again in 1938.
