= Eric Glass =

Australian rules footballer

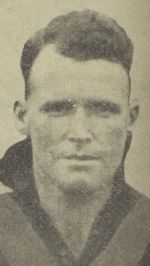

Personal information
- Full name: Eric George Glass
- Nickname: Tarzan
- Born: 22 February 1910; Northam, Western Australia
- Died: 29 July 1985 (aged 75); Ashwood, Victoria
- Original team: Goomalling
- Height: 178 cm (5 ft 10 in)
- Weight: 89 kg (196 lb)
- Positions: Forward pocket, ruck rover

Playing career^{1}
Years	Club	Games (Goals)
1927, 1930–32	East Fremantle (WAFL)	55 (115)
1933–38	Melbourne (VFL)	78 (135)
1939–41, 1945	Williamstown (VFA)	82 (54)
- ^{1} Playing statistics correct to the end of 1938.

Career highlights
- Williamstown Team of the Century; Melbourne leading goalkicker: 1936; WAFL premiership player: 1930, 1931; VFA premiership player: 1939, 1945

Eric George "Tarzan" Glass (22 February 1910 – 29 July 1985) was an Australian rules footballer who played for East Fremantle in the West Australian Football League (WAFL), Melbourne Football Club in the Victorian Football League (VFL) and Williamstown in the Victorian Football Association (VFA). He also served in the Royal Australian Air Force in World War II.

== Early life ==
Glass was born on 22 February 1910 in Northam, Western Australia, and raised in Goomalling, Western Australia.

== Football career ==
=== East Fremantle ===
Glass began his senior career with East Fremantle, playing in the WAFL. A "heavy, raw recruit", he debuted in 1927 and was considered to be "slow and cumbersome" at the beginning of his career. In his time with East Fremantle Glass played 55 games, becoming one of the team's "strongest and most useful players". Included in that were the 1930 and 1931 Grand Finals, both of which East Fremantle won. In the 1930 Grand Final, Glass kicked two goals, playing as a full forward, and in 1931 he again kicked two goals, this time playing on the half forward flank. He played for East Fremantle until the end of the 1932 season.

=== Melbourne ===
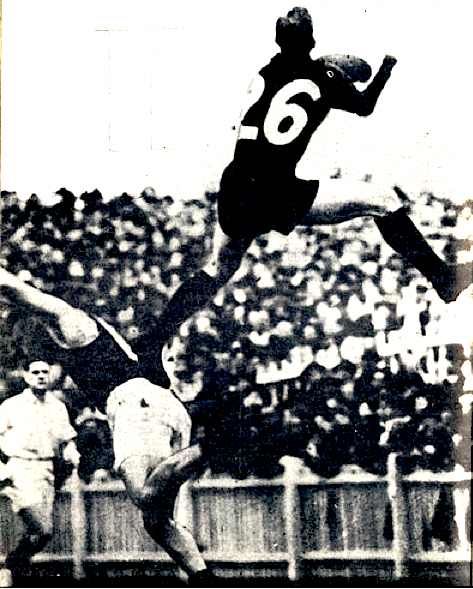
Carlton star Jim Park taking a "specky" over Glass, 12 May 1938

Prior to the 1933 season, Glass was recruited by Melbourne to play in the VFL. This required Glass to leave his home state of Western Australia and relocate to Victoria, but Melbourne offered Glass a job, as an employee of the Melbourne Cricket Ground, and Glass accepted the offer. It was during his time at Melbourne that Glass received the nickname "Tarzan", for his ferocious determination to win the ball. Glass began his career at Melbourne as a midfielder, kicking only eight goals in his first 13 games, but polling seven Brownlow Medal votes. In 1934 and 1935 his goalkicking increased, kicking 20 and 21 goals respectively. Glass's best season for the Demons came in 1936; he played mainly as a forward, where he formed a good combination with full forward, Norm Smith. Glass finished 1936 having kicked 56 goals and was Melbourne's leading goalkicker, in a season when the Demons finished third, their best result while Glass played for them. Glass played two more seasons for Melbourne, 1937 and 1938, but neither were as successful as his 1936 season and he could manage only 16 games throughout the two years. Glass left Melbourne at the end of 1938 having played 78 games and amassed 138 goals— the Demons went on to win the next three VFL premierships.

=== Williamstown ===
Having left Melbourne, Glass was recruited by Williamstown, who played in the VFA, the second tier Australian rules football competition in Victoria. In his first season with Williamstown, the Seagulls won their third VFA premiership, winning the Grand Final against Brunswick by a single point, with Glass playing as a ruck-rover. Glass played with Williamstown from 1939 until 1941, when he enlisted in the Royal Australian Air Force to serve in World War II.

Glass enlisted after the conclusion of the 1941 season, on 26 November. Due to his involvement in World War II, Glass ceased playing for Williamstown. After being officially discharged from the Air Force on 5 September 1946, with the rank of corporal, Glass played one more season for the Seagulls in 1945. He was named as the team's vice-captain at the beginning of the season, and played in their 1945 Grand Final victory over Port Melbourne. The 1945 season was Glass' last, and he retired having played 82 VFA games for a return of 54 goals.

Glass died on 29 July 1985 in Ashwood, Victoria and was buried at the Springvale Botanical Cemetery. In 2003 he was posthumously selected in the Williamstown Football Club's Team of the Century, in the position of ruck-rover.
