= George Bennett (Australian rules footballer) =

Australian rules footballer

Personal information
- Full name: George Henry Jordan Bennett
- Born: 22 September 1911; Hawthorn, Victoria
- Died: 10 October 1974 (aged 63); Narrandera, New South Wales
- Original team: Camberwell (VFA)
- Height: 184 cm (6 ft 0 in)
- Weight: 78 kg (172 lb)

Playing career^{1}
Years	Club	Games (Goals)
1929	Camberwell	? (3)
1930–1933	Hawthorn	59 (2)
1934–1940	Footscray	108 (14)
1941	Camberwell	? (?)
1942–1944	Hawthorn	33 (7)
1945–1946	Sandringham	22 (22)
Total		245 (48)
- ^{1} Playing statistics correct to the end of 1946.

Career highlights
- McCarthy trophy: 1935

George Henry Jordan Bennett (22 September 1911 – 10 October 1974) was an Australian rules footballer who played with Footscray and Hawthorn in the VFL.

Bennett commenced his VFA career in 1929 with Camberwell.

Bennett started his VFL career in 1930 with Hawthorn and remained with the club until the end of the 1933 season. The club was enforcing a rule in which a player who missed three consecutive senior games due to either injury or suspension had to return to the side through the reserves.

Bennett disagreed with this rule and moved to Footscray for the 1934 season. The following season he won their best and fairest award as well as finishing 8th in the 1935 Brownlow Medal.

Bennett played with Camberwell in 1941. He ended up playing 26 games for Camberwell.

He came back to the Hawks in 1942 and brought up his 200th league game in 1944.

Bennett was appointed as captain / coach of Sandringham in 1945 and played 22 games with Sandringham in 1945 and 1946.

He is remembered for being a defender, known for skyscraping marks and skill in the air.

Bennett played for Matong Football Club in the South West Football League (New South Wales) in 1950.
