= Ron Dowling =

Australian rules footballer, born 1913

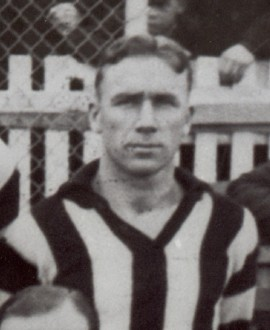
- Dowling in 1939

Personal information
- Full name: Ron Dowling
- Born: 27 June 1913; Heidelberg
- Died: 5 March 2005 (aged 91); Melbourne
- Original team: Ivanhoe Amateur
- Height: 175 cm (5 ft 9 in)
- Weight: 73 kg (161 lb)

Playing career^{1}
Years	Club	Games (Goals)
1936–1940	Collingwood	72 (9)
- ^{1} Playing statistics correct to the end of 1940.

Ron Dowling (27 June 1913 – 5 March 2005) was an Australian rules footballer who played with Collingwood in the Victorian Football League (VFL).

Dowling, an engineer by profession, played as an amateur during his league career. He was on the wing for Collingwood in both the 1937 and 1938 VFL Grand Finals, which they lost. A suspension cost an appearance in a third successive grand final in 1939, having been found guilty of striking Melbourne player Keith Truscott in the semi-final.

Before he died, at the age of 91 in 2005, he was the oldest living Collingwood player.
