= Alan Williams (Australian footballer) =

Australian rules footballer

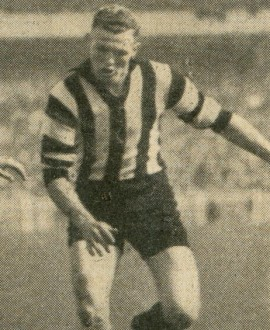
- Williams during his Collingwood career

Personal information
- Full name: Alan B. Williams
- Born: 17 December 1917
- Died: 6 November 1988 (aged 70)
- Original team: Chelsea / Parkside Amateurs
- Height: 188 cm (6 ft 2 in)
- Weight: 84 kg (185 lb)
- Position: Utility

Playing career^{1}
Years	Club	Games (Goals)
1938–1945	Collingwood	115 (91)
- ^{1} Playing statistics correct to the end of 1945.

Alan Williams (17 December 1917 – 6 November 1988) was an Australian rules footballer who played for Collingwood in the Victorian Football League (VFL).

Williams was tried in many roles at Collingwood, initially in the ruck where he played in their losing 1938 VFL Grand Final team. He participated in the 1939 VFL Grand Final, which Collingwood lost and he played at centre half back.

In 1940 he kicked a career high 23 goals and his VFL career ended in disappointment when Collingwood were knocked out of the 1945 finals series.

Despite leaving Collingwood, Williams continued playing football with Williamstown, which he captained-coached.

Williams was captain-coach of Healesville Football Club in the Yarra Valley Football League from 1948 to 1950. Healesville were runner up in 1948 and 1949.

Williams was captain-coach of the Yarra Valley Football League team that defeated the Croydon District Football League by one point in 1949.

== Links ==
- Alan Williams's playing statistics from AFL Tables
