= Frank Anderson (footballer, born 1913) =

Australian rules footballer (1913–1997)

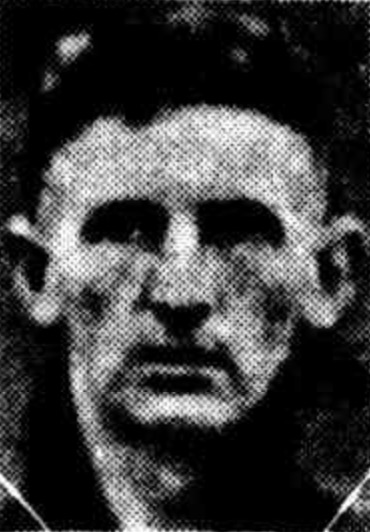
- Anderson in March 1946

Personal information
- Full name: Francis Walter Anderson
- Born: 23 October 1913; Glen Huntly, Victoria
- Died: 6 March 1997 (aged 83)
- Original team: Brunswick (VFA)
- Height: 183 cm (6 ft 0 in)
- Weight: 84 kg (185 lb)

Playing career^{1}
Years	Club	Games (Goals)
1934–1944	Carlton	155 (41)
- ^{1} Playing statistics correct to the end of 1944.

Career highlights
- VFL premiership player: 1938

Francis Walter Anderson (23 October 1913 – 6 March 1997) was an Australian rules footballer who played with Carlton in the VFL.

Anderson was born at Glenhuntly and attended school at West Brunswick. He started his career at Brunswick as a forward but later played most of his football in defence. He was a premiership player with Carlton in 1938 and a Victorian interstate representative in 1941. Anderson finished second in Carlton's best and fairest on three occasions.

After leaving Carlton he became captain-coach of Preston in the VFA. After a couple of years Anderson took up the coaching role at Cobram Football Club.
