= Jim Reid (Australian footballer) =

Australian rules footballer, born 1913

Personal information
- Full name: James Brown Willis Reid
- Born: 1 May 1913; Cue, Western Australia
- Died: 3 September 1983 (aged 70)
- Original team: Claremont
- Height: 179 cm (5 ft 10 in)
- Weight: 76 kg (168 lb)
- Position: Half forward/Wing

Playing career^{1}
Years	Club	Games (Goals)
1935–36	South Melbourne	36 (6)
1937–46	Claremont	107
- ^{1} Playing statistics correct to the end of 1946.

James Brown Willis Reid (1 May 1913 – 3 September 1983) was an Australian rules footballer who played with South Melbourne in the Victorian Football League (VFL) during the 1930s.

Reid played predominantly on the wings where he was noted for his speedy bursts and drop kicks but was also used at half forward. He made an impact at South Melbourne despite playing just two seasons, finishing equal ninth at the 1935 Brownlow Medal which made him the best placed South Melbourne player. Reid was a wingman in both the 1935 and 1936 VFL Grand Finals.

He started at Claremont in 1937 and was a member of their premiership team that year as well as the next. In 1939 he won Claremont's 'Best and Fairest' award but missed out on a spot in his third successive Grand Final through injury. Reid, who represented Western Australia at the 1937 Perth Carnival, also won a 'Best and Fairest' in 1940.
