= Wayne Johnston (footballer) =

Australian rules footballer, born 1957

Personal information
- Born: 19 December 1957 (age 68)
- Original team: Wandin North
- Debut: Round 3, 1979, Carlton vs. Essendon

Playing career^{1}
Years	Club	Games (Goals)
1975–1978	Prahran	49 (139)
1979–1990	Carlton	209 (283)
1991	Sturt	3 (2)
Total		261 (424)
- ^{1} Playing statistics correct to the end of 1991.

Career highlights
- Carlton Football Club Hall of Fame inductee, 1991; Carlton Best and Fairest: 1983, 1986; Carlton Captain: 1984–1985; Premierships: 1979, 1981, 1982, 1987; Carlton Team of the Century (half-forward flank); Australian Football Hall of Fame inductee, 2018

Wayne "The Dominator" Johnston (born 19 December 1957) is a former Australian rules footballer. Johnston played 209 games and kicked 283 goals for the Carlton Football Club (The Blues), in a career spanning 1979–1990. He was inducted into the Carlton Football Club Hall of Fame in 1991. In 2018, Johnston was inducted into the Australian Football Hall of Fame.

== Playing career ==
After playing junior football in Wandin, Johnston attracted the attention of Victorian Football Association recruiters; in 1975. After being rejected by Oakleigh because it already had a number of rovers on its playing list, he signed to play for Prahran. Johnston played for Prahran from 1975 until 1978, and was part of their 1978 premiership winning team.

Under VFL zone laws in those days, in 1979 Johnston asked to be cleared to play for the Melbourne Football Club, but he was part of Carlton's zone, and coach Alex Jesaulenko wanted to see him play before axing him. He debuted in the first game of the 1979 season against the Essendon Bombers. Johnston impressed, and became a vital member of the 1979 premiership side. He could play either across the half-forward line or in the centre. He was the recipient of the Carlton Best and Fairest award, the John Nicholls Medal (at that time called the Robert Reynolds Trophy), first in 1983 and then in 1986, when he tied with Craig Bradley.

Johnston was made captain of the Blues from 1984 to 1985, and his presence was critical in high-pressure games and especially finals. He played in the Carlton premiership sides of 1979, 1981, 1982 and 1987.

For 1991, Johnston was signed by struggling SANFL club Sturt and was regarded as a key recruit in the hope of improving the Double Blues from only two wins in 1990, but injuries meant he played just three games for the Double Blues before injury ended his playing career and he was sacked ten weeks before the SANFL minor round ended.

In 2003 he was selected in Prahran's Team of the Century.

== Personal life ==
With his first wife Debbie Johnston, has four surviving children. A fifth, Matt, died in 1999 from an asthma attack.

After retiring from football, he moved to Brisbane in 1993, where, among other jobs, he worked as a wharfie. He stayed connected with football, however, and for a time coached the Mt Gravatt Vultures in the AFL Queensland South-East Premier League.

Following the breakup of his marriage, Johnston and family moved back to Melbourne; there he found a new love, actress Kate Kendall, and they married on 28 November 2004. Johnston returned to the AFL environment and served as a runner for two seasons for Richmond. His sons are also keen footballers. One of his sons, Marc, currently plays for Sandringham in the VFL.
