= Don McIntyre =

Australian rules footballer, born 1915

Personal information
- Full name: Daniel Gordon McIntyre
- Born: 5 March 1915; Geelong, Victoria
- Died: 16 July 2013 (aged 98)
- Original team: Pakenham
- Height: 179 cm (5 ft 10 in)
- Weight: 77 kg (170 lb)

Playing career^{1}
Years	Club	Games (Goals)
1935–1942	Carlton	100 (2)
- ^{1} Playing statistics correct to the end of 1942.

Daniel Gordon "Don" McIntyre (5 March 1915 – 16 July 2013) was an Australian rules footballer who played with Carlton in the VFL. McIntyre played as a defender, usually in the back pocket. He won a Best and Fairest in 1937 and was the last surviving premiership player with Carlton in 1938.

A trained pilot, McIntyre flew operations in northern Australia and New Guinea during his service in the Royal Australian Air Force in World War II.
