= Jack Carmody =

Australian rules footballer, born 1911

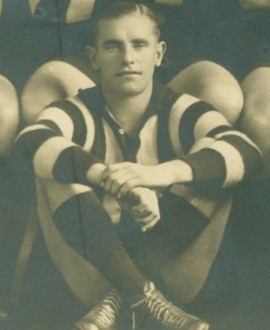
- Carmody in 1935

Personal information
- Full name: John Henry Carmody
- Born: 7 June 1911; Richmond, Victoria
- Died: 28 March 1982 (aged 70); South Melbourne, Victoria
- Original team: Fairfield
- Height: 173 cm (5 ft 8 in)
- Weight: 72 kg (159 lb)

Playing career^{1}
Years	Club	Games (Goals)
1933–1939	Collingwood	94 (12)
1940–1946	Hawthorn	64 (46)
Total		158 (58)
- ^{1} Playing statistics correct to the end of 1946.

Career highlights
- 2× VFL premiership player: 1935, 1936; Hawthorn captain: 1942

John Henry Carmody (7 June 1911 – 28 March 1982) was an Australian rules footballer who played with Collingwood and Hawthorn in the Victorian Football League (VFL).

Carmody was member of Collingwood's back-to-back premierships in 1935 and 1936. He was used mostly on the wing and during the late 1930s often found himself on the sidelines due to the strength of the Collingwood side. As a result, he crossed to Hawthorn in 1940 where he played some games up forward and captained the club in 1942.

== Honours and achievements ==
Collingwood

- 2× VFL premiership player: 1935, 1936

Individual

- Hawthorn captain: 1942
- Hawthorn life member
