= 1937 Perth Carnival =

Australian football tournament

Tournament information
- Sport: Australian football
- Location: Perth, Western Australia
- Dates: 7 August 1937–14 August 1937
- Format: Round Robin
- Teams: 3

Final champion
- Victoria

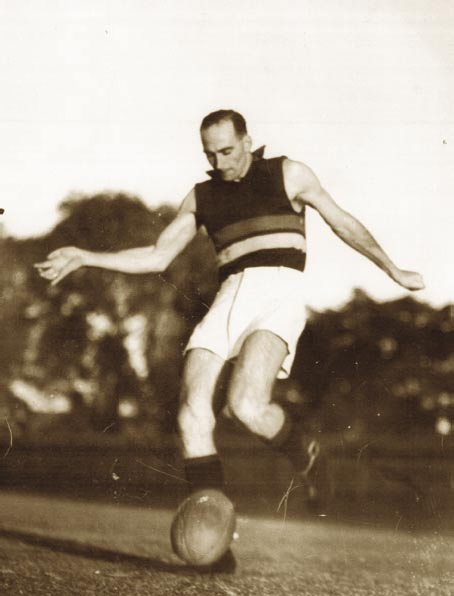
Tassie Medalist Mick Cronin

The 1937 Perth Carnival was the ninth edition of the Australian National Football Carnival, an Australian football interstate competition.

== Overview ==
Just like in the Perth Carnival of 1921 only South Australia and Victoria took a team to Western Australia.

Only one of the games was a blowout, with Western Australia handing South Australia their worst ever carnival loss, in a 116-point win. George Doig kicked seven goals for the home side.

In the second game, South Australia came close to upsetting Victoria and got within two points at the final siren. The last four scoring shots of the game were all behinds to South Australia inside the final two minutes of the game.

The final game of the carnival would decide the overall winner and after going into the game as underdogs Victoria hung on against Western Australia at Subiaco Oval to win by eight points. The win was thanks largely to Victorian full-back Jack Regan restricting Doig to just three goals. Other Victorian stars who took part in the carnival included Haydn Bunton, Jack Dyer, Les Hardiman, Dick Harris and Keith Shea.

An enormous crowd estimated to be 40,000 people (38,022 who paid admission, plus members and guests) witnessed the final match between Victoria and Western Australia. The crowd set a new record for the highest crowd in Western Australian sporting history, exceeding by a considerable margin the previous record of 27,273 set at an interstate match in 1929. Considerable damage was suffered by facilities at Subiaco Oval, including the partial collapse of the fence around the arena, due to its inability to accommodate such a large crowd. The crowd of 23,263 to Western Australia's first match was also one of the highest in the state's history, and was drawn in spite of heavy rain which forced the traditional parade of teams to be cancelled.

== Results ==
	1937 Perth Carnival
Saturday, 7 August (3:00pm)	Western Australia 25.15 (165)	def.	South Australia 6.13 (49)	Subiaco Oval (crowd: 23,263)
Wednesday, 11 August (3:00pm)	Victoria 15.25 (115)	def.	South Australia 16.17 (113)	Subiaco Oval (crowd: 18,240)
Saturday, 14 August (3:00pm)	Victoria 14.13 (97)	def.	Western Australia 13.11 (89)	Subiaco Oval (crowd: 40,000)

== Tassie Medal ==
The inaugural Tassie Medal was awarded to Mick Cronin (Western Australia), who polled 13 votes. Ned Hender (South Australia) was second with 9 votes, and J. Hooper (Western Australia) and Jack Regan (Victoria) were equal third with 7 votes each.
