= Jack Carney (footballer) =

Australian rules footballer (1909–1981)

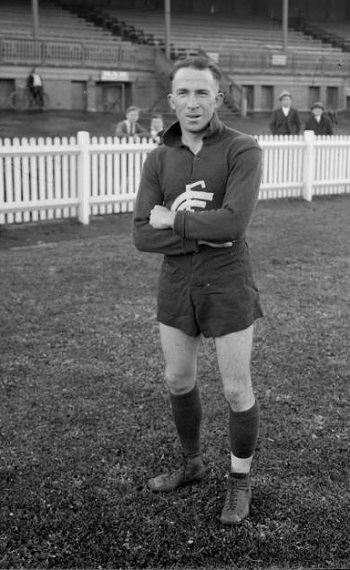
- Carney during his Carlton career

Personal information
- Full name: John Richard William Carney
- Born: 22 January 1909; Ondit, Victoria
- Died: 31 October 1981 (aged 72)
- Original team: Colac
- Height: 160 cm (5 ft 3 in)
- Weight: 62 kg (137 lb)

Playing career^{1}
Years	Club	Games (Goals)
1930–1934	Geelong	79 (4)
1936–1941	Carlton	84 (6)
Total		163 (10)
- ^{1} Playing statistics correct to the end of 1941.

John Richard William Carney (22 January 1909 – 31 October 1981) was an Australian rules footballer who played with Geelong and Carlton in the Victorian Football League (VFL) during the 1930s.

Carney was a dashing wingman and started his league career with Geelong in 1930. Standing at just 160 cm he is the smallest player ever to represent Geelong and is said to have worn size three shoes. He was a member of Geelong's 1931 premiership side and played 79 games with the club before crossing to Carlton in 1936. He was a premiership player with Carlton in 1938 and a regular Victorian interstate representative. After ending his playing career in 1941 he became coach of the Carlton reserves team and served various administrative positions throughout the rest of his life. Carney was inducted into the Carlton Football Club Hall of Fame in 2024.
