= Frank Gill (Australian footballer) =

Australian rules footballer, born 1908

Personal information
- Full name: Francis Gill
- Born: 10 December 1908; Casterton, Victoria
- Died: 23 June 1970 (aged 61); Parkville, Victoria
- Original team: Nhill
- Height: 183 cm (6 ft 0 in)
- Weight: 83 kg (183 lb)

Playing career^{1}
Years	Club	Games (Goals)
1929–1942	Carlton	205 (14)
- ^{1} Playing statistics correct to the end of 1942.

Frank Gill (10 December 1908 – 23 June 1970) was an Australian rules footballer who played with Carlton in the VFL. He is a member of the Carlton Hall of Fame.

Francis "Frank" Gill was a full back and was one of the longest kickers of the ball in his time. He represented Victoria in 1932 and captained Carlton the following season. He was a premiership player with Carlton in 1938; in a memorable grand final performance, he struggled early at full back against prolific Collingwood full forward Ron Todd, conceding two early goals from free kicks; but was lauded for later dominating a rotation through the rucks during which Carlton kicked four goals in five minutes before half time.

In 1939 he won Carlton's best and fairest..

Frank's brother George "Leather" Gill played 7 games with Geelong in 1915. George's son (Franks nephew) Pat Gill played 2 games with North Melbourne in 1946.

Two nephews John and Barry Gill also played for Carlton, their Father Wally Gill was Frank Gill's brother. Wally had trained with Carlton in 1926, but was injured during pre-season and headed back to Nhill.
