= Bob Green (footballer) =

Australian rules footballer

Personal information
- Born: 5 January 1911
- Died: 8 May 1949 (aged 38); Preston, Victoria
- Original team: Ascot Vale CYMS (CYMSFA)
- Height: 179 cm (5 ft 10 in)
- Weight: 75 kg (165 lb)

Playing career^{1}
Years	Club	Games (Goals)
1933–1945	Carlton	187 (58)
- ^{1} Playing statistics correct to the end of 1945.

Robert Green (5 January 1911 – 8 May 1949) was an Australian rules footballer who played with Carlton in the VFL for 13 seasons, from 1933 to 1945 (inclusive).

== Football ==
The younger brother of Carlton player Jack Green, Bob was a wingman in Carlton's 1938 premiership side.

== Death ==
Green died on 8 May 1949 in Preston, Victoria, when he was hit by a car at a tram stop. He was 38.
