= Vin Doherty =

Australian rules footballer, born 1911

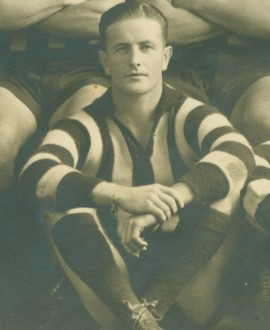
- Doherty in 1935

Personal information
- Full name: Vincent Joseph Anthony Doherty
- Born: 26 March 1911; Avenel, Victoria
- Died: 22 November 1982 (aged 71); Reservoir, Victoria
- Original team: Victoria Brewery
- Height: 169 cm (5 ft 7 in)
- Weight: 63 kg (139 lb)
- Position: Half forward flank

Playing career^{1}
Years	Club	Games (Goals)
1934–39	Collingwood	96 (122)
1940	Hawthorn	5 (13)
1942–43	Fitzroy	12 (21)
Total		113 (156)
- ^{1} Playing statistics correct to the end of 1943.

Vincent Joseph Anthony Doherty (26 March 1911 – 22 November 1982) was an Australian rules footballer who played for Collingwood, Hawthorn and Fitzroy in the Victorian Football League (VFL).

Doherty, a small half forward flanker, started his career at Collingwood in 1934 and shared his league debut with future club great Phonse Kyne. As part of a very strong Collingwood side, Doherty participated in five successive VFL Grand Finals from 1935 to 1939, winning the first two. He performed well in the premiership years, kicking 30 goals in 1935 and 33 goals in 1936. Vin was also Collingwood's second highest vote getter behind Jack Regan in the 1935 Brownlow Medal count, finishing equal ninth overall.

He crossed to Hawthorn in 1940 and kicked seven goals on debut which set a new club record for most goals by someone playing their first game with Hawthorn. It equaled his best tally in a game, having previously kicked seven for Collingwood against Footscray back in 1935. Doherty only spent a year at Hawthorn before moving to Fitzroy where he played for a further two seasons.
