= Roy Sitch =

Australian rules footballer, born 1915

Personal information
- Full name: Roy Joseph Sitch
- Born: 3 November 1915; North Melbourne, Victoria
- Died: 6 April 1956 (aged 40); Kalkallo, Victoria
- Original team: Coburg / Fawkner
- Height: 180 cm (5 ft 11 in)
- Weight: 83 kg (183 lb)
- Position: Half back flank

Playing career^{1}
Years	Club	Games (Goals)
1936–40	North Melbourne	63 (2)
- ^{1} Playing statistics correct to the end of 1940.

Roy Joseph Sitch (3 November 1915 – 6 April 1956) was an Australian rules footballer who played with North Melbourne in the Victorian Football League (VFL).

== Family ==
The son of Percival Sitch (1896-1965), and Euphemia Morgan Sitch (1891-1964), née Thomson, Roy Joseph Sitch was born at North Melbourne, Victoria on 3 November 1915.

He married Thelma Joan Schofield (1922-1998) in Kelso, New South Wales, in August 1946.

== Military service ==
In January 1934, he attempted to enlist in the Militia, but was rejected on medical grounds; he has a "large untreated hydrocele".

He enlisted in the Second AIF in December 1941, and served until his discharge in 1946.

== Death ==
He died at Kalkallo, Victoria on 6 April 1956. A football match to raise funds for Sitch's family was played at Coburg between teams from North Melbourne and Coburg on 12 August 1956.
