= Jim Francis =

Australian rules footballer, born 1910

Personal information
- Full name: James Arthur Francis
- Born: 12 December 1910; Hawthorn, Victoria, Australia
- Died: 16 November 2004 (aged 93); Mt Martha, Victoria, Australia
- Original team: Manningtree P.S.
- Height: 183 cm (6 ft 0 in)
- Weight: 80 kg (176 lb)

Playing career^{1}
Years	Club	Games (Goals)
1929–1933	Hawthorn	61 (26)
1934–1943	Carlton	162 (52)
Total		223 (78)

Coaching career
Years	Club	Games (W–L–D)
1956–1958	Carlton	55 (29–25–1)
1959–1960	St Kilda	36 (18–18–0)
Total		91 (47–43–1)
- ^{1} Playing statistics correct to the end of 1943.

James Arthur Francis (12 December 1910 – 16 November 2004) was an Australian rules footballer and coach in the Victorian Football League (VFL).

== Family ==
The son of Henry Walter Francis (1883–1964) and Sarah Victoria Francis, née Jackson (1884–1929), James Arthur Francis was born in Hawthorn on 12 December 1910.

His brothers John and Syd also played VFL football, both for Hawthorn.

In 1937, James Francis married Shirley Louise King at St. Stephens Church of England in Richmond.

== Football ==
=== Hawthorn ===
After playing 61 games for Hawthorn, Francis left the Hawks in controversial circumstances, due to a disagreement with the club and his family's sports store. Francis wanted the club to order their uniforms through his store, but when Hawthorn secretary Sam Ramsay refused, he asked for a clearance to Carlton.

=== Carlton ===
Francis made his debut for the Carlton Football Club in round 9 of the 1934 season. He retired as a player at the end of the 1943 season having played 162 games and was later appointed coach of the Blues from 1956 to 1958. Under his tenure the Blues struggled, despite having a good side on paper, and Francis was sacked in 1958. Francis was bitter about the firing and never spoke to his former close friend and Carlton coaching successor Ken Hands again.

=== St Kilda ===
Francis was appointed St Kilda Football Club senior coach for 1959–60, again achieving modest on-field results.

== Death ==
Jim Francis died on 16 November 2004 and is buried at Box Hill Cemetery.
