= 1950 VFL season =

54th season of the Victorian Football League (VFL)

1950 VFL premiership season
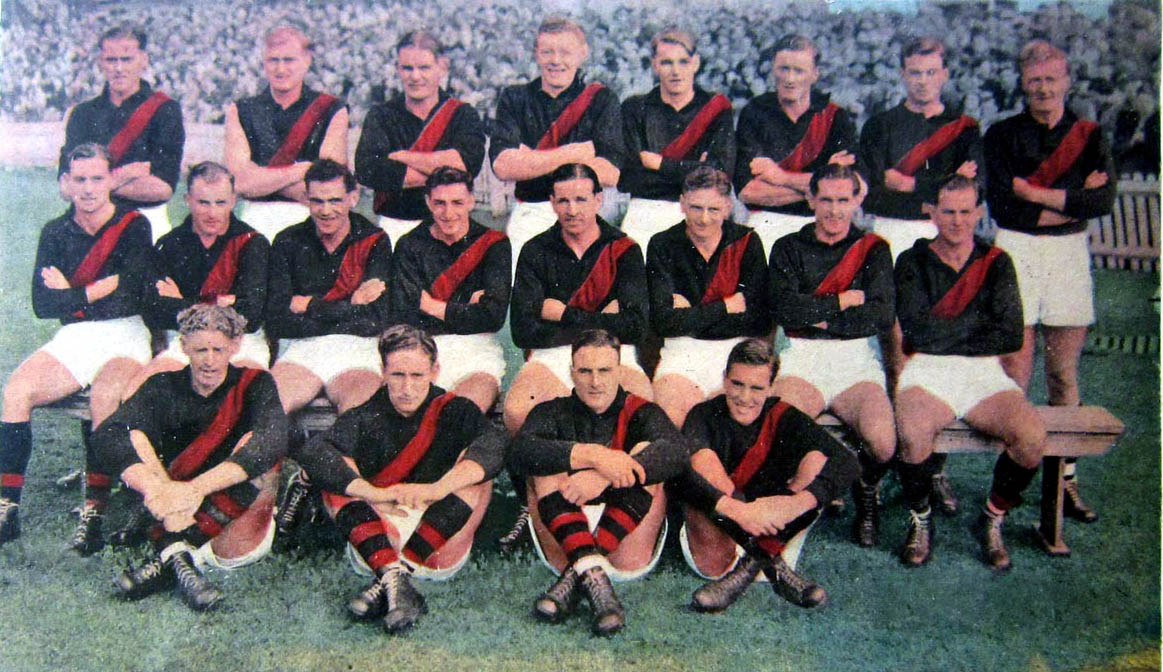
- Essendon Football Club team, premiers
- Teams: 12
- Premiers: Essendon; 10th premiership
- Minor premiers: Essendon; 10th minor premiership
- Brownlow Medallist: Allan Ruthven (Fitzroy)
- John Coleman (Essendon)
- Matches played: 112
- Highest: 85,869

The 1950 VFL season was the 54th season of the Victorian Football League (VFL), the highest level senior Australian rules football competition in Victoria. The season featured twelve clubs, ran from 22 April until 23 September, and comprised an 18-game home-and-away season followed by a finals series featuring the top four clubs.

The premiership was won by the Essendon Football Club for the tenth time and second time consecutively, after it defeated North Melbourne by 38 points in the 1950 VFL Grand Final.

== Background ==
In 1950, the VFL competition consisted of twelve teams of 18 on-the-field players each, plus two substitute players, known as the 19th man and the 20th man. A player could be substituted for any reason; however, once substituted, a player could not return to the field of play under any circumstances.

Teams played each other in a home-and-away season of 18 rounds; matches 12 to 18 were the "home-and-way reverse" of matches 1 to 7.

Once the 18 round home-and-away season had finished, the 1950 VFL Premiers were determined by the specific format and conventions of the Page–McIntyre system.

== Home-and-away season ==
=== Round 1 ===
Home team	Home team score	Away team	Away team score	Venue	Crowd	Date
North Melbourne	11.8 (74)	Richmond	9.10 (64)	Arden Street Oval	20,000	22 April 1950
Footscray	9.20 (74)	St Kilda	12.11 (83)	Western Oval	13,500	22 April 1950
Hawthorn	4.15 (39)	Geelong	18.11 (119)	Glenferrie Oval	10,000	22 April 1950
Fitzroy	9.10 (64)	Essendon	9.16 (70)	Brunswick Street Oval	20,000	22 April 1950
South Melbourne	14.12 (96)	Collingwood	11.10 (76)	Lake Oval	20,000	22 April 1950
Melbourne	13.13 (91)	Carlton	10.11 (71)	MCG	33,000	22 April 1950

=== Round 2 ===
Home team	Home team score	Away team	Away team score	Venue	Crowd	Date
Essendon	29.7 (181)	South Melbourne	10.16 (76)	Windy Hill	22,000	29 April 1950
Collingwood	16.11 (107)	Fitzroy	9.11 (65)	Victoria Park	22,300	29 April 1950
Carlton	18.18 (126)	North Melbourne	16.14 (110)	Princes Park	30,500	29 April 1950
Richmond	10.12 (72)	Melbourne	10.13 (73)	Punt Road Oval	25,000	29 April 1950
St Kilda	20.24 (144)	Hawthorn	5.5 (35)	Junction Oval	10,000	29 April 1950
Geelong	18.17 (125)	Footscray	13.14 (92)	Kardinia Park	20,200	29 April 1950

=== Round 3 ===
Home team	Home team score	Away team	Away team score	Venue	Crowd	Date
Footscray	13.24 (102)	Hawthorn	4.9 (33)	Western Oval	10,000	6 May 1950
South Melbourne	11.15 (81)	St Kilda	15.13 (103)	Lake Oval	20,000	6 May 1950
North Melbourne	12.11 (83)	Melbourne	7.17 (59)	Arden Street Oval	18,000	6 May 1950
Richmond	9.15 (69)	Fitzroy	8.11 (59)	Punt Road Oval	17,000	6 May 1950
Geelong	8.16 (64)	Essendon	18.11 (119)	Kardinia Park	23,000	6 May 1950
Collingwood	8.22 (70)	Carlton	12.9 (81)	Victoria Park	30,000	6 May 1950

=== Round 4 ===
Home team	Home team score	Away team	Away team score	Venue	Crowd	Date
Fitzroy	16.27 (123)	South Melbourne	8.9 (57)	Brunswick Street Oval	12,500	13 May 1950
Essendon	21.9 (135)	Footscray	9.10 (64)	Windy Hill	18,000	13 May 1950
Carlton	17.15 (117)	Richmond	16.10 (106)	Princes Park	29,000	13 May 1950
St Kilda	12.8 (80)	North Melbourne	10.18 (78)	Junction Oval	30,000	13 May 1950
Melbourne	10.7 (67)	Geelong	9.16 (70)	MCG	23,000	13 May 1950
Hawthorn	6.12 (48)	Collingwood	7.25 (67)	Glenferrie Oval	9,000	13 May 1950

=== Round 5 ===
Home team	Home team score	Away team	Away team score	Venue	Crowd	Date
North Melbourne	14.12 (96)	South Melbourne	14.9 (93)	Arden Street Oval	14,000	20 May 1950
Footscray	13.11 (89)	Melbourne	16.9 (105)	Western Oval	12,500	20 May 1950
Fitzroy	19.15 (129)	Hawthorn	4.24 (48)	Brunswick Street Oval	8,500	20 May 1950
Richmond	10.18 (78)	Essendon	17.8 (110)	Punt Road Oval	33,000	20 May 1950
Geelong	10.19 (79)	Collingwood	12.8 (80)	Kardinia Park	23,000	20 May 1950
St Kilda	10.14 (74)	Carlton	8.7 (55)	Junction Oval	47,000	20 May 1950

=== Round 6 ===
Home team	Home team score	Away team	Away team score	Venue	Crowd	Date
Geelong	20.15 (135)	St Kilda	5.11 (41)	Kardinia Park	24,000	27 May 1950
Collingwood	14.14 (98)	Richmond	16.11 (107)	Victoria Park	24,000	27 May 1950
Carlton	16.13 (109)	Footscray	16.10 (106)	Princes Park	16,500	27 May 1950
South Melbourne	20.14 (134)	Hawthorn	10.14 (74)	Lake Oval	9,500	27 May 1950
Melbourne	13.17 (95)	Fitzroy	6.8 (44)	MCG	21,000	27 May 1950
North Melbourne	13.8 (86)	Essendon	11.5 (71)	Arden Street Oval	25,000	27 May 1950

=== Round 7 ===
Home team	Home team score	Away team	Away team score	Venue	Crowd	Date
Hawthorn	6.12 (48)	Melbourne	14.12 (96)	Glenferrie Oval	8,000	3 June 1950
Fitzroy	7.7 (49)	North Melbourne	13.15 (93)	Brunswick Street Oval	14,000	3 June 1950
Essendon	19.13 (127)	St Kilda	9.9 (63)	Windy Hill	27,000	3 June 1950
Richmond	12.7 (79)	Geelong	9.20 (74)	Punt Road Oval	26,000	3 June 1950
Footscray	10.7 (67)	Collingwood	19.25 (139)	Western Oval	19,000	3 June 1950
South Melbourne	9.14 (68)	Carlton	11.8 (74)	Lake Oval	22,000	3 June 1950

=== Round 8 ===
Home team	Home team score	Away team	Away team score	Venue	Crowd	Date
Hawthorn	9.7 (61)	Richmond	14.9 (93)	Glenferrie Oval	14,000	10 June 1950
Footscray	19.11 (125)	South Melbourne	9.8 (62)	Western Oval	13,000	10 June 1950
Carlton	11.5 (71)	Essendon	10.16 (76)	Princes Park	46,500	10 June 1950
North Melbourne	10.17 (77)	Geelong	8.12 (60)	Arden Street Oval	30,000	12 June 1950
St Kilda	14.17 (101)	Fitzroy	14.12 (96)	Junction Oval	22,000	12 June 1950
Melbourne	16.9 (105)	Collingwood	8.11 (59)	MCG	55,000	12 June 1950

=== Round 9 ===
Home team	Home team score	Away team	Away team score	Venue	Crowd	Date
Richmond	14.13 (97)	St Kilda	10.11 (71)	Punt Road Oval	28,000	17 June 1950
Fitzroy	11.18 (84)	Footscray	6.15 (51)	Brunswick Street Oval	13,000	17 June 1950
Essendon	22.15 (147)	Hawthorn	9.7 (61)	Windy Hill	14,000	17 June 1950
Collingwood	9.12 (66)	North Melbourne	14.14 (98)	Victoria Park	24,500	17 June 1950
South Melbourne	8.12 (60)	Melbourne	13.16 (94)	Lake Oval	16,000	17 June 1950
Geelong	13.20 (98)	Carlton	15.9 (99)	Kardinia Park	23,500	17 June 1950

=== Round 10 ===
Home team	Home team score	Away team	Away team score	Venue	Crowd	Date
Footscray	13.12 (90)	North Melbourne	12.22 (94)	Western Oval	17,300	24 June 1950
Fitzroy	7.11 (53)	Geelong	9.19 (73)	Brunswick Street Oval	12,000	24 June 1950
Collingwood	15.12 (102)	St Kilda	9.14 (68)	Victoria Park	17,500	24 June 1950
South Melbourne	14.17 (101)	Richmond	13.8 (86)	Lake Oval	15,500	24 June 1950
Melbourne	8.15 (63)	Essendon	10.12 (72)	MCG	55,700	24 June 1950
Hawthorn	16.15 (111)	Carlton	16.20 (116)	Glenferrie Oval	10,000	24 June 1950

=== Round 11 ===
Home team	Home team score	Away team	Away team score	Venue	Crowd	Date
Geelong	19.21 (135)	South Melbourne	8.7 (55)	Kardinia Park	16,500	1 July 1950
Carlton	10.13 (73)	Fitzroy	15.8 (98)	Princes Park	19,000	1 July 1950
St Kilda	6.17 (53)	Melbourne	9.13 (67)	Junction Oval	23,000	1 July 1950
North Melbourne	14.16 (100)	Hawthorn	2.13 (25)	Arden Street Oval	10,000	1 July 1950
Richmond	15.18 (108)	Footscray	8.14 (62)	Punt Road Oval	17,000	1 July 1950
Essendon	12.18 (90)	Collingwood	6.12 (48)	Windy Hill	22,000	1 July 1950

=== Round 12 ===
Home team	Home team score	Away team	Away team score	Venue	Crowd	Date
Geelong	16.15 (111)	Hawthorn	4.12 (36)	Kardinia Park	13,000	8 July 1950
Essendon	12.17 (89)	Fitzroy	9.7 (61)	Windy Hill	19,000	8 July 1950
Collingwood	16.21 (117)	South Melbourne	9.20 (74)	Victoria Park	14,500	8 July 1950
Carlton	8.15 (63)	Melbourne	10.14 (74)	Princes Park	21,500	8 July 1950
Richmond	10.10 (70)	North Melbourne	8.9 (57)	Punt Road Oval	23,000	8 July 1950
St Kilda	8.11 (59)	Footscray	11.10 (76)	Junction Oval	14,000	8 July 1950

=== Round 13 ===
Home team	Home team score	Away team	Away team score	Venue	Crowd	Date
Melbourne	13.16 (94)	Richmond	9.10 (64)	MCG	38,000	15 July 1950
Hawthorn	10.11 (71)	St Kilda	12.12 (84)	Glenferrie Oval	9,000	15 July 1950
Footscray	11.10 (76)	Geelong	10.19 (79)	Western Oval	16,000	15 July 1950
South Melbourne	8.9 (57)	Essendon	22.17 (149)	Lake Oval	16,000	15 July 1950
Fitzroy	16.12 (108)	Collingwood	12.13 (85)	Brunswick Street Oval	17,000	15 July 1950
North Melbourne	12.18 (90)	Carlton	11.14 (80)	Arden Street Oval	25,000	15 July 1950

=== Round 14 ===
Home team	Home team score	Away team	Away team score	Venue	Crowd	Date
St Kilda	10.18 (78)	South Melbourne	13.10 (88)	Junction Oval	18,000	22 July 1950
Melbourne	4.8 (32)	North Melbourne	7.13 (55)	MCG	34,000	22 July 1950
Fitzroy	6.10 (46)	Richmond	5.6 (36)	Brunswick Street Oval	14,000	22 July 1950
Essendon	8.14 (62)	Geelong	6.9 (45)	Windy Hill	18,000	22 July 1950
Carlton	12.7 (79)	Collingwood	17.14 (116)	Princes Park	30,500	29 July 1950
Hawthorn	11.12 (78)	Footscray	11.14 (80)	Glenferrie Oval	9,000	29 July 1950

=== Round 15 ===
Home team	Home team score	Away team	Away team score	Venue	Crowd	Date
North Melbourne	15.14 (104)	St Kilda	7.5 (47)	Arden Street Oval	9,000	5 August 1950
Geelong	13.14 (92)	Melbourne	9.12 (66)	Kardinia Park	15,500	5 August 1950
Collingwood	16.21 (117)	Hawthorn	2.8 (20)	Victoria Park	9,000	5 August 1950
South Melbourne	11.8 (74)	Fitzroy	11.11 (77)	Lake Oval	9,000	5 August 1950
Footscray	10.9 (69)	Essendon	10.11 (71)	Western Oval	13,000	5 August 1950
Richmond	14.20 (104)	Carlton	9.16 (70)	Punt Road Oval	18,000	5 August 1950

=== Round 16 ===
Home team	Home team score	Away team	Away team score	Venue	Crowd	Date
Essendon	20.15 (135)	Richmond	11.12 (78)	Windy Hill	24,000	12 August 1950
Collingwood	10.15 (75)	Geelong	11.15 (81)	Victoria Park	26,000	12 August 1950
Carlton	12.11 (83)	St Kilda	11.17 (83)	Princes Park	10,500	12 August 1950
South Melbourne	13.11 (89)	North Melbourne	21.14 (140)	Lake Oval	11,000	12 August 1950
Melbourne	15.11 (101)	Footscray	14.14 (98)	MCG	17,500	12 August 1950
Hawthorn	11.14 (80)	Fitzroy	23.16 (154)	Glenferrie Oval	7,000	12 August 1950

=== Round 17 ===
Home team	Home team score	Away team	Away team score	Venue	Crowd	Date
Hawthorn	14.10 (94)	South Melbourne	16.7 (103)	Glenferrie Oval	6,500	19 August 1950
Fitzroy	7.10 (52)	Melbourne	6.11 (47)	Brunswick Street Oval	12,500	19 August 1950
Essendon	15.12 (102)	North Melbourne	13.16 (94)	Windy Hill	33,500	19 August 1950
St Kilda	8.6 (54)	Geelong	6.12 (48)	Junction Oval	12,000	19 August 1950
Richmond	15.19 (109)	Collingwood	15.10 (100)	Punt Road Oval	16,000	19 August 1950
Footscray	13.14 (92)	Carlton	12.7 (79)	Western Oval	10,000	19 August 1950

=== Round 18 ===
Home team	Home team score	Away team	Away team score	Venue	Crowd	Date
Geelong	10.14 (74)	Richmond	12.14 (86)	Kardinia Park	22,500	26 August 1950
Collingwood	9.10 (64)	Footscray	8.14 (62)	Victoria Park	12,000	26 August 1950
Carlton	13.4 (82)	South Melbourne	10.10 (70)	Princes Park	10,000	26 August 1950
Melbourne	23.18 (156)	Hawthorn	9.6 (60)	MCG	10,500	26 August 1950
North Melbourne	9.12 (66)	Fitzroy	13.12 (90)	Arden Street Oval	16,000	26 August 1950
St Kilda	8.7 (55)	Essendon	21.10 (136)	Junction Oval	27,000	26 August 1950

== Ladder ==
(P)	Premiers
	Qualified for finals

#	Team	P	W	L	D	PF	PA	%	Pts
1	Essendon (P)	18	17	1	0	1942	1197	162.2	68
2	North Melbourne	18	13	5	0	1595	1293	123.4	52
3	Melbourne	18	12	6	0	1485	1205	123.2	48
4	Geelong	18	10	8	0	1562	1256	124.4	40
5	Fitzroy	18	10	8	0	1452	1314	110.5	40
6	Richmond	18	10	8	0	1506	1476	102.0	40
7	Collingwood	18	9	9	0	1586	1437	110.4	36
8	Carlton	18	8	9	1	1528	1637	93.3	34
9	St Kilda	18	8	9	1	1341	1553	86.3	34
10	Footscray	18	5	13	0	1475	1608	91.7	20
11	South Melbourne	18	5	13	0	1438	1904	75.5	20
12	Hawthorn	18	0	18	0	1022	2052	49.8	0

Rules for classification: 1. premiership points; 2. percentage; 3. points for
Average score: 83.0
Source: AFL Tables

== Finals series ==
=== Semi-finals ===
Team	1 Qtr	2 Qtr	3 Qtr	Final
Melbourne	2.2	3.2	5.4	6.8 (44)
Geelong	1.1	4.5	8.6	13.10 (88)
Attendance: 54,817

Team	1 Qtr	2 Qtr	3 Qtr	Final
Essendon	5.5	6.8	9.11	11.14 (80)
North Melbourne	0.3	5.7	8.9	11.11 (77)
Attendance: 75,433

=== Preliminary final ===
Team	1 Qtr	2 Qtr	3 Qtr	Final
North Melbourne	1.0	4.8	10.11	14.16 (100)
Geelong	7.3	8.4	11.7	12.11 (83)
Attendance: 73,530

=== Grand final ===
Team	1 Qtr	2 Qtr	3 Qtr	Final
Essendon	7.3	7.6	10.11	13.14 (92)
North Melbourne	4.0	5.5	7.9	7.12 (54)
Attendance: 85,869

== Season notes ==
- In the early 1950 pre-season, veteran Collingwood coach Jock McHale announced his retirement after a then-record 714 senior games. Collingwood called for applications for a non-playing coach, and champion ruckman Phonse Kyne immediately announced his retirement and applied for the job. On 13 April, the Thursday before the last pre-season practice match, the Collingwood committee announced that it had appointed the (then) coach of the Collingwood Second Eighteen team, Bervyn Woods as coach, by the casting vote of the President Harry Curtis. The announcement was greeted with anger, because it meant that Kyne would have to go elsewhere to realise his coaching ambitions. At Collingwood's final practice match, the crowd continuously booed and jeered Woods, the members of the Collingwood committee that had voted for him were threatened and abused, and Kyne was carried around the ground on the shoulders of the crowd at the end of the match. The following day, Woods withdrew his application and reverted to coaching the Second Eighteen, and Kyne was appointed coach. All committee members then resigned their positions, and Curtis did not seek re-election. Former player Syd Coventry was elected the new president, unopposed.
- In Round 2, St Kilda recorded its first win by 100 points or more, defeating Hawthorn 20.24 (144) to 5.5 (35).
- North Melbourne reached the Grand Final for the first time since joining the VFL in 1925.
- In Round 9, North Melbourne won for the first time at Victoria Park, after having suffered 23 straight defeats at the ground.
- Essendon won the First Eighteen, Second Eighteen, and Third Eighteen premierships in 1950.

== Awards ==
- The 1950 VFL Premiership team was Essendon.
- The VFL's leading goalkicker was John Coleman of Essendon with 120 goals (including 8 goals in the final series).
- The winner of the 1950 Brownlow Medal was Allan Ruthven of Fitzroy with 21 votes.
- Hawthorn took the "wooden spoon" in 1950.

== Sources ==
- 1950 VFL season at AFL Tables
- 1950 VFL season at Australian Football
