= Syd Francis =

Australian rules footballer (1913–2009)

Personal information
- Full name: Syd Francis
- Born: 20 February 1913
- Died: 19 October 2009 (aged 96)
- Original team: Swinburne Tech
- Height: 178 cm (5 ft 10 in)
- Weight: 76 kg (168 lb)

Playing career^{1}
Years	Club	Games (Goals)
1932	Hawthorn	2 (0)
- ^{1} Playing statistics correct to the end of 1932.

Syd Francis (20 February 1913 – 19 October 2009) was an Australian rules footballer who played with Hawthorn in the Victorian Football League (VFL).
