= Jack Ross (footballer, born 1911) =

Australian rules footballer, born 1911

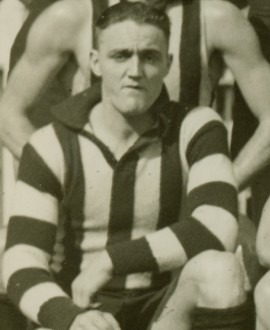
- Ross in 1931

Personal information
- Full name: Richard John Ross
- Born: 9 September 1911; Omeo, Victoria
- Died: 21 February 1996 (aged 84)
- Original team: Northcote (VFA)
- Height: 173 cm (5 ft 8 in)
- Weight: 70 kg (154 lb)
- Position: Half back

Playing career^{1}
Years	Club	Games (Goals)
1931–1940	Collingwood	142 (30)
- ^{1} Playing statistics correct to the end of 1940.

Richard John Ross (9 September 1911 – 21 February 1996) was an Australian rules footballer who played with Collingwood in the Victorian Football League (VFL).

Ross was a utility player who was used mostly at half back. He appeared in five successive Grand Finals from 1935 to 1939, the first two of them premierships. His brother Bob also played at Collingwood.

Ross later served in the Royal Australian Air Force for six months during World War II.
