= Bill Milroy =

Australian rules footballer (1929–1992)

Personal information
- Full name: William Wallace Milroy
- Born: 24 October 1929; Carlton, Victoria
- Died: 21 June 1992 (aged 62)
- Original team: Terang
- Height: 189 cm (6 ft 2 in)
- Weight: 90 kg (198 lb)

Playing career^{1}
Years	Club	Games (Goals)
1950–1951	North Melbourne	7 (0)
1951–1956	Carlton	90 (50)
Total		97 (50)
- ^{1} Playing statistics correct to the end of 1956.

William Wallace Milroy (24 October 1929 – 21 June 1992) was an Australian rules footballer in the Victorian Football League.

Milroy made his debut for the Carlton Football Club in the Round 16 of the 1951 season. He left the Blues at the end of the 1956 season.

At Carlton he was "Best and Fairest" Player 1954. For a time he was also Vice Captain. His tally of 50 goals during that time affords evidence that he was a useful player while resting in the forward lines. A combination of immense determination, doggedness, and energy helped compensate to a large extent for any skill deficiencies.

Milroy died 21 June 1992.
