= Harry Hollingshead =

Australian rules footballer, born 1915

Personal information
- Full name: John Henry Hollingshead
- Born: 22 September 1915; St Kilda, Victoria
- Died: 15 April 1998 (aged 82); Brisbane, Queensland
- Original team: Kilmore
- Height: 188 cm (6 ft 2 in)
- Weight: 91 kg (201 lb)

Playing career^{1}
| Years | Club | Games (Goals) |
| 1936–1940 | Carlton | 31 (33) |
- ^{1} Playing statistics correct to the end of 1940.

John Henry "Harry" Hollingshead (22 September 1915 – 15 April 1998) was an Australian rules footballer who played with Carlton in the VFL during the late 1930s.

A follower, Hollingshead was a premiership player with Carlton in 1938.
