= Jack Knight (footballer) =

Australian rules footballer, born 1912

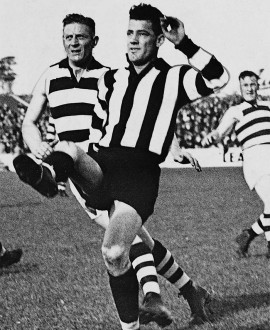
- Knight in 1938

Personal information
- Full name: Jack Knight
- Born: 21 November 1912
- Died: 17 July 1976 (aged 63)
- Original team: South Bendigo
- Height: 183 cm (6 ft 0 in)
- Weight: 80 kg (176 lb)
- Position: Ruckman

Playing career^{1}
Years	Club	Games (Goals)
1934–1940	Collingwood	104 (85)
1941–1942	St Kilda	24 (16)
Total		128 (101)

Coaching career
Years	Club	Games (W–L–D)
1941	St Kilda	18 (3–15–0)
- ^{1} Playing statistics correct to the end of 1942.

Jack 'Cracker' Knight (21 November 1912 – 17 July 1976) was an Australian rules footballer who played with Collingwood and both played for and coached St Kilda in the Victorian Football League (VFL).

A ruckman from South Bendigo, Knight wasn't selected in Collingwood's 1935 premiership team despite playing in the Preliminary Final. He made up for it by participating in the 1936 Grand Final, where he played in a forward pocket and kicked a goal in the win. Disappointment followed in 1937 when a six-week suspension for striking Ron Baggott of Melbourne in the Prelim cost him another Grand Final place but he would appear in the next two season's premiership deciders. Knight transferred to St Kilda in 1941 as captain-coach but the club struggled and although he stayed on for another season, it was as a player only.
