= Bervin Woods =

Australian rules footballer, born 1910

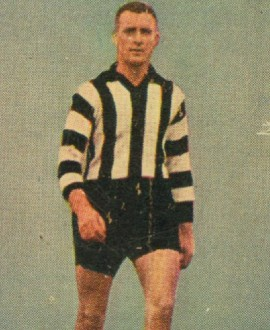
- Woods in 1935

Personal information
- Full name: Bervin Robert Woods
- Born: 9 January 1910; Koondrook, Victoria
- Died: 13 January 2002 (aged 92)
- Original team: Brunswick / Mortlake
- Height: 180 cm (5 ft 11 in)
- Weight: 86 kg (190 lb)
- Position: Defender

Playing career^{1}
Years	Club	Games (Goals)
1935–1940	Collingwood	110 (6)
- ^{1} Playing statistics correct to the end of 1940.

Bervin Robert Woods (9 January 1910 – 13 January 2002) was an Australian rules footballer who played for Collingwood in the Victorian Football League (VFL) during the late 1930s.

Despite spending only six seasons at Collingwood, Woods played in five Grand Finals, all in succession from 1935 to 1939. These included premierships in 1935 and 1936. He was mostly a defender and could also play effectively in the ruck.

Woods was involved in controversy in the 1950 VFL pre-season when he left his job as coach of Collingwood's reserves to replace the retired Jock McHale as senior coach.

As the club was seeking a non-playing coach, Phonse Kyne announced his retirement and applied for the job — the five applicants were Harry Chesswas, Harry Collier, Phonse Kyne, Harold Rumney, and Bervin Woods — but Kyne was passed up in favour of Woods. The majority of Collingwood supporters were not happy to see Woods get the job ahead of Kyne and jeered both him and the committee during a practice game in April.

Woods withdrew his application for the role within five days of his appointment and returned to the reserves.

The affair resulted in the sacking of long-standing committee men Harry Curtis and Bob Rush.

In 1951 Woods was appointed coach of Brunswick. After two seasons of coaching Woods became a publican.
