= Jack Regan =

Australian rules footballer

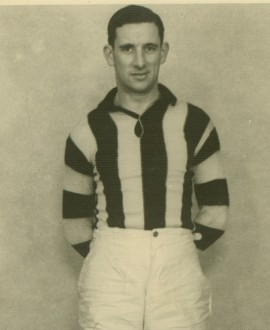
- Regan during his Collingwood career

Personal information
- Full name: John Vincent Regan
- Born: 12 September 1912; Northcote, Victoria
- Died: 11 August 1988 (aged 75); Heidelberg West, Victoria
- Original team: Northcote (VFA)
- Debut: Round 3, 1930, Collingwood vs. South Melbourne, at Lake Oval
- Height: 185 cm (6 ft 1 in)
- Weight: 83 kg (183 lb)
- Position: Full-back

Playing career^{1}
Years	Club	Games (Goals)
1930–41, 1943, 1946	Collingwood	196 (3)

Representative team honours
Years	Team	Games (Goals)
	Victoria	14
- ^{1} Playing statistics correct to the end of 1946.

Career highlights
- Collingwood premierships 1935, 1936; Copeland Trophy 1936; Collingwood captain 1940–41, 1943; Collingwood Team of the Century; Inducted into Australian Football Hall of Fame 1996

John Vincent Regan (12 September 1912 – 11 August 1988) was an Australian rules footballer who represented Collingwood in the Victorian Football League (VFL) during the 1930s and 1940s.

== Playing career ==
Recruited from Northcote, Regan struggled in his first few seasons and was tried in a variety of positions before he established himself at full-back.

Taking on and matching full-forwards like South Melbourne's Bob Pratt (whom Regan regarded as his most difficult opponent), Carlton's Harry Vallence, Richmond's Jack Titus and St Kilda's Bill Mohr, Regan earned his title as the "Prince of Full-backs".

Regan was among the best players in the Magpies' 1935 and 1936 premiership victories, both against South Melbourne.

In May 1938, during a match against Carlton, Regan fell heavily and suffered a double dislocation of an elbow. He spent a week at St Vincent's Hospital, and ended up missing nine matches. He recovered in time to play a part in Collingwood's finals campaign, but again for the second successive year was on the losing end as Carlton emerged victorious with the 1938 pennant.

In January 1942 Regan announced his retirement from football to join the Salesian community at Sunbury as a lay brother.

In February 1943, with Australia now involved heavily in the Second World War, Regan enlisted with the Royal Australian Air Force (RAAF) and served as a leading aircraftman. He returned in 1943 to captain Collingwood.

In April 1946, shortly after being discharged from military service, Regan returned to Collingwood and trained so well that he was selected for their Round 1 match of the 1946 season against Hawthorn.

In March 1947, it was announced that Regan had been appointed coach of Kalgoorlie City Football Club in Goldfields Football League.

Essendon champion Dick Reynolds considered Regan the best full-back he ever saw. In an article for Melbourne newspaper The Argus Reynolds recounted watching Regan play state football against the likes of Ken Farmer from South Australia and George Doig from Western Australia and said:

[H]e made them earn every goal they kicked against him. It was great to see the way in which he shadowed them or marked or punched the ball away, and then, with great dash and a beautiful kick, sent the ball in the right position for an attack. His quick thinking and unruffled style at critical moments made him a star full-back.

During his playing career, Regan had worked as a clerk for the Commonwealth Social Service in Melbourne. After returning to Melbourne from Kalgoorlie he continued to serve at Collingwood for many years, and was club secretary from 1969 to 1977.

== Posthumous honours ==
Regan was among the first players inducted into the Australian Football Hall of Fame in 1996. He was considered for the full-back position in the VFL/AFL Team of the Century, although that honour ultimately went to Carlton's Stephen Silvagni. In 1997, when the Collingwood Team of the Century was announced, Regan was named at full-back.

In 2004, at the launch of the Collingwood Hall of Fame, Regan was one of 18 inducted players.

The Collingwood player who finishes fifth in the club's best-and-fairest count is awarded the Jack Regan Trophy.
