= 1938 VFL season =

42nd season of the Victorian Football League (VFL)

1938 VFL premiership season
- Teams: 12
- Premiers: Carlton; 6th premiership
- Minor premiers: Carlton; 9th minor premiership
- Brownlow Medallist: Dick Reynolds (Essendon)
- Ron Todd (Collingwood)
- Matches played: 112
- Highest: 96,486

The 1938 VFL season was the 42nd season of the Victorian Football League (VFL), the highest level senior Australian rules football competition in Victoria. The season featured twelve clubs, ran from 23 April until 24 September, and comprised an 18-game home-and-away season followed by a finals series featuring the top four clubs.

The premiership was won by the Carlton Football Club for the sixth time, after it defeated Collingwood by 15 points in the 1938 VFL Grand Final.

== Background ==
In 1938, the VFL competition consisted of twelve teams of 18 on-the-field players each, plus one substitute player, known as the 19th man. A player could be substituted for any reason; however, once substituted, a player could not return to the field of play under any circumstances.

Teams played each other in a home-and-away season of 18 rounds; matches 12 to 18 were the "home-and-way reverse" of matches 1 to 7.

Once the 18 round home-and-away season had finished, the 1938 VFL Premiers were determined by the specific format and conventions of the Page–McIntyre system.

== Home-and-away season ==
=== Round 1 ===
Home team	Home team score	Away team	Away team score	Venue	Crowd	Date
Geelong	17.13 (115)	Melbourne	20.12 (132)	Corio Oval	16,000	23 April 1938
Essendon	17.17 (119)	St Kilda	12.13 (85)	Windy Hill	15,000	23 April 1938
Richmond	19.26 (140)	North Melbourne	9.9 (63)	Punt Road Oval	16,000	23 April 1938
South Melbourne	14.13 (97)	Footscray	9.14 (68)	Lake Oval	18,000	23 April 1938
Fitzroy	12.15 (87)	Collingwood	14.21 (105)	Brunswick Street Oval	22,000	23 April 1938
Hawthorn	11.10 (76)	Carlton	14.8 (92)	Glenferrie Oval	18,000	23 April 1938

=== Round 2 ===
Home team	Home team score	Away team	Away team score	Venue	Crowd	Date
North Melbourne	9.10 (64)	South Melbourne	6.8 (44)	Arden Street Oval	11,000	30 April 1938
Collingwood	18.19 (127)	Essendon	9.20 (74)	Victoria Park	15,000	30 April 1938
Carlton	12.23 (95)	Richmond	14.10 (94)	Princes Park	32,000	30 April 1938
Melbourne	14.8 (92)	Hawthorn	16.15 (111)	MCG	11,327	30 April 1938
St Kilda	13.16 (94)	Geelong	8.17 (65)	Junction Oval	17,000	30 April 1938
Footscray	13.17 (95)	Fitzroy	10.5 (65)	Western Oval	15,000	30 April 1938

=== Round 3 ===
Home team	Home team score	Away team	Away team score	Venue	Crowd	Date
Geelong	20.16 (136)	North Melbourne	6.11 (47)	Corio Oval	9,500	7 May 1938
Fitzroy	12.11 (83)	Melbourne	17.14 (116)	Brunswick Street Oval	14,000	7 May 1938
South Melbourne	8.12 (60)	St Kilda	11.17 (83)	Lake Oval	18,000	7 May 1938
Hawthorn	8.14 (62)	Footscray	9.16 (70)	Glenferrie Oval	14,500	7 May 1938
Richmond	15.12 (102)	Collingwood	11.26 (92)	Punt Road Oval	30,000	7 May 1938
Essendon	14.17 (101)	Carlton	15.12 (102)	Windy Hill	17,000	7 May 1938

=== Round 4 ===
Home team	Home team score	Away team	Away team score	Venue	Crowd	Date
Melbourne	23.15 (153)	South Melbourne	15.11 (101)	MCG	14,569	14 May 1938
Footscray	8.17 (65)	Geelong	10.12 (72)	Western Oval	16,000	14 May 1938
Collingwood	21.15 (141)	Hawthorn	14.16 (100)	Victoria Park	14,000	14 May 1938
Carlton	17.19 (121)	Fitzroy	10.10 (70)	Princes Park	16,000	14 May 1938
St Kilda	15.9 (99)	Richmond	13.11 (89)	Junction Oval	25,000	14 May 1938
North Melbourne	14.17 (101)	Essendon	19.11 (125)	Arden Street Oval	15,000	14 May 1938

=== Round 5 ===
Home team	Home team score	Away team	Away team score	Venue	Crowd	Date
Hawthorn	13.9 (87)	Richmond	12.12 (84)	Glenferrie Oval	18,000	21 May 1938
Essendon	15.15 (105)	South Melbourne	11.19 (85)	Windy Hill	14,000	21 May 1938
St Kilda	11.16 (82)	North Melbourne	10.12 (72)	Junction Oval	14,000	21 May 1938
Melbourne	10.12 (72)	Footscray	10.16 (76)	MCG	14,979	21 May 1938
Geelong	21.21 (147)	Fitzroy	11.9 (75)	Corio Oval	10,000	21 May 1938
Collingwood	17.12 (114)	Carlton	19.16 (130)	Victoria Park	38,000	21 May 1938

=== Round 6 ===
Home team	Home team score	Away team	Away team score	Venue	Crowd	Date
Footscray	17.19 (121)	St Kilda	7.13 (55)	Western Oval	21,000	28 May 1938
Carlton	14.18 (102)	Melbourne	16.11 (107)	Princes Park	20,000	28 May 1938
South Melbourne	13.16 (94)	Hawthorn	18.12 (120)	Lake Oval	11,000	28 May 1938
Richmond	18.9 (117)	Geelong	12.16 (88)	Punt Road Oval	22,000	28 May 1938
Fitzroy	14.9 (93)	Essendon	11.13 (79)	Brunswick Street Oval	13,000	28 May 1938
North Melbourne	10.7 (67)	Collingwood	23.11 (149)	Arden Street Oval	12,000	28 May 1938

=== Round 7 ===
Home team	Home team score	Away team	Away team score	Venue	Crowd	Date
Geelong	19.32 (146)	South Melbourne	10.10 (70)	Corio Oval	8,000	4 June 1938
Fitzroy	12.15 (87)	Richmond	14.10 (94)	Brunswick Street Oval	16,000	4 June 1938
Essendon	16.20 (116)	Hawthorn	16.7 (103)	Windy Hill	12,000	4 June 1938
North Melbourne	9.14 (68)	Footscray	9.16 (70)	Arden Street Oval	15,000	4 June 1938
Melbourne	17.13 (115)	Collingwood	15.11 (101)	MCG	30,877	4 June 1938
St Kilda	6.15 (51)	Carlton	12.18 (90)	Junction Oval	24,000	4 June 1938

=== Round 8 ===
Home team	Home team score	Away team	Away team score	Venue	Crowd	Date
Melbourne	18.14 (122)	North Melbourne	14.8 (92)	MCG	12,808	11 June 1938
Essendon	12.12 (84)	Geelong	14.23 (107)	Windy Hill	19,000	11 June 1938
Collingwood	16.23 (119)	St Kilda	14.9 (93)	Victoria Park	17,500	11 June 1938
Carlton	15.20 (110)	Footscray	12.11 (83)	Princes Park	43,000	13 June 1938
South Melbourne	8.14 (62)	Richmond	20.15 (135)	Lake Oval	19,000	13 June 1938
Hawthorn	7.11 (53)	Fitzroy	12.22 (94)	Glenferrie Oval	16,000	13 June 1938

=== Round 9 ===
Home team	Home team score	Away team	Away team score	Venue	Crowd	Date
Geelong	11.23 (89)	Hawthorn	6.13 (49)	Corio Oval	7,000	18 June 1938
Fitzroy	16.12 (108)	South Melbourne	8.8 (56)	Brunswick Street Oval	12,000	18 June 1938
St Kilda	14.12 (96)	Melbourne	16.16 (112)	Junction Oval	14,000	18 June 1938
Richmond	15.14 (104)	Essendon	15.9 (99)	Punt Road Oval	20,000	18 June 1938
Footscray	13.9 (87)	Collingwood	10.5 (65)	Western Oval	18,000	18 June 1938
North Melbourne	11.5 (71)	Carlton	16.25 (121)	Arden Street Oval	13,000	18 June 1938

=== Round 10 ===
Home team	Home team score	Away team	Away team score	Venue	Crowd	Date
Hawthorn	8.12 (60)	St Kilda	9.10 (64)	Glenferrie Oval	10,000	25 June 1938
Fitzroy	12.16 (88)	North Melbourne	6.10 (46)	Brunswick Street Oval	12,000	25 June 1938
Essendon	14.16 (100)	Footscray	17.9 (111)	Windy Hill	18,000	25 June 1938
Richmond	12.17 (89)	Melbourne	10.8 (68)	Punt Road Oval	23,000	25 June 1938
Geelong	13.12 (90)	Collingwood	13.17 (95)	Corio Oval	13,000	25 June 1938
South Melbourne	11.7 (73)	Carlton	16.13 (109)	Lake Oval	14,000	25 June 1938

=== Round 11 ===
Home team	Home team score	Away team	Away team score	Venue	Crowd	Date
Footscray	13.20 (98)	Richmond	7.4 (46)	Western Oval	20,000	2 July 1938
Collingwood	12.17 (89)	South Melbourne	12.5 (77)	Victoria Park	10,000	2 July 1938
Carlton	12.16 (88)	Geelong	12.10 (82)	Princes Park	19,500	2 July 1938
North Melbourne	13.14 (92)	Hawthorn	12.6 (78)	Arden Street Oval	4,000	2 July 1938
St Kilda	11.8 (74)	Fitzroy	10.11 (71)	Junction Oval	10,000	2 July 1938
Melbourne	11.13 (79)	Essendon	13.7 (85)	MCG	12,054	2 July 1938

=== Round 12 ===
Home team	Home team score	Away team	Away team score	Venue	Crowd	Date
St Kilda	15.13 (103)	Essendon	22.17 (149)	Junction Oval	17,000	13 June 1938
North Melbourne	14.3 (87)	Richmond	12.11 (83)	Arden Street Oval	11,000	9 July 1938
Footscray	19.19 (133)	South Melbourne	10.10 (70)	Western Oval	16,000	9 July 1938
Collingwood	10.19 (79)	Fitzroy	10.13 (73)	Victoria Park	15,000	9 July 1938
Carlton	12.12 (84)	Hawthorn	8.15 (63)	Princes Park	14,000	9 July 1938
Melbourne	11.8 (74)	Geelong	13.14 (92)	MCG	20,185	9 July 1938

=== Round 13 ===
Home team	Home team score	Away team	Away team score	Venue	Crowd	Date
Hawthorn	10.9 (69)	Melbourne	9.16 (70)	Glenferrie Oval	7,000	23 July 1938
Geelong	14.20 (104)	St Kilda	15.13 (103)	Corio Oval	7,000	23 July 1938
Fitzroy	13.8 (86)	Footscray	18.21 (129)	Brunswick Street Oval	16,000	23 July 1938
South Melbourne	14.11 (95)	North Melbourne	13.18 (96)	Lake Oval	8,000	23 July 1938
Essendon	17.17 (119)	Collingwood	17.16 (118)	Windy Hill	13,000	23 July 1938
Richmond	20.12 (132)	Carlton	12.19 (91)	Punt Road Oval	28,000	23 July 1938

=== Round 14 ===
Home team	Home team score	Away team	Away team score	Venue	Crowd	Date
St Kilda	10.12 (72)	South Melbourne	7.12 (54)	Junction Oval	10,000	30 July 1938
Footscray	17.14 (116)	Hawthorn	4.7 (31)	Western Oval	11,000	30 July 1938
Collingwood	9.9 (63)	Richmond	11.10 (76)	Victoria Park	22,000	30 July 1938
Carlton	11.16 (82)	Essendon	10.16 (76)	Princes Park	18,000	30 July 1938
North Melbourne	7.9 (51)	Geelong	15.16 (106)	Arden Street Oval	8,000	30 July 1938
Melbourne	14.12 (96)	Fitzroy	14.9 (93)	MCG	9,060	30 July 1938

=== Round 15 ===
Home team	Home team score	Away team	Away team score	Venue	Crowd	Date
Richmond	7.11 (53)	St Kilda	7.14 (56)	Punt Road Oval	15,000	6 August 1938
Essendon	13.9 (87)	North Melbourne	16.8 (104)	Windy Hill	10,000	6 August 1938
South Melbourne	9.16 (70)	Melbourne	14.15 (99)	Lake Oval	8,000	6 August 1938
Geelong	13.15 (93)	Footscray	10.10 (70)	Corio Oval	18,500	6 August 1938
Hawthorn	12.11 (83)	Collingwood	18.15 (123)	Glenferrie Oval	8,000	6 August 1938
Fitzroy	11.10 (76)	Carlton	19.12 (126)	Brunswick Street Oval	17,000	6 August 1938

=== Round 16 ===
Home team	Home team score	Away team	Away team score	Venue	Crowd	Date
North Melbourne	12.11 (83)	St Kilda	7.15 (57)	Arden Street Oval	9,000	13 August 1938
Footscray	19.17 (131)	Melbourne	13.13 (91)	Western Oval	19,000	13 August 1938
Fitzroy	13.12 (90)	Geelong	19.12 (126)	Brunswick Street Oval	8,000	13 August 1938
Carlton	14.17 (101)	Collingwood	19.7 (121)	Princes Park	37,000	13 August 1938
Richmond	19.18 (132)	Hawthorn	12.11 (83)	Punt Road Oval	9,000	13 August 1938
South Melbourne	13.13 (91)	Essendon	12.14 (86)	Lake Oval	8,000	13 August 1938

=== Round 17 ===
Home team	Home team score	Away team	Away team score	Venue	Crowd	Date
Hawthorn	17.15 (117)	South Melbourne	9.20 (74)	Glenferrie Oval	7,000	20 August 1938
Geelong	20.17 (137)	Richmond	12.12 (84)	Corio Oval	19,500	20 August 1938
Essendon	15.17 (107)	Fitzroy	15.6 (96)	Windy Hill	9,000	20 August 1938
Collingwood	22.18 (150)	North Melbourne	14.12 (96)	Victoria Park	14,000	20 August 1938
St Kilda	17.17 (119)	Footscray	12.9 (81)	Junction Oval	17,000	20 August 1938
Melbourne	14.12 (96)	Carlton	11.13 (79)	MCG	25,241	20 August 1938

=== Round 18 ===
Home team	Home team score	Away team	Away team score	Venue	Crowd	Date
Footscray	18.11 (119)	North Melbourne	11.18 (84)	Western Oval	13,000	27 August 1938
Collingwood	12.19 (91)	Melbourne	11.16 (82)	Victoria Park	30,000	27 August 1938
Carlton	15.14 (104)	St Kilda	13.10 (88)	Princes Park	16,000	27 August 1938
South Melbourne	12.8 (80)	Geelong	15.12 (102)	Lake Oval	6,000	27 August 1938
Richmond	13.15 (93)	Fitzroy	15.18 (108)	Punt Road Oval	7,000	27 August 1938
Hawthorn	9.15 (69)	Essendon	12.18 (90)	Glenferrie Oval	6,500	27 August 1938

== Ladder ==
(P)	Premiers
	Qualified for finals

#	Team	P	W	L	D	PF	PA	%	Pts
1	Carlton (P)	18	14	4	0	1827	1574	116.1	56
2	Geelong	18	13	5	0	1897	1468	129.2	52
3	Footscray	18	13	5	0	1723	1386	124.3	52
4	Collingwood	18	12	6	0	1942	1652	117.6	48
5	Melbourne	18	11	7	0	1776	1676	106.0	44
6	Richmond	18	10	8	0	1747	1563	111.8	40
7	Essendon	18	9	9	0	1801	1760	102.3	36
8	St Kilda	18	9	9	0	1474	1606	91.8	36
9	North Melbourne	18	6	12	0	1384	1852	74.7	24
10	Fitzroy	18	5	13	0	1543	1742	88.6	20
11	Hawthorn	18	4	14	0	1414	1717	82.4	16
12	South Melbourne	18	2	16	0	1353	1885	71.8	8

Rules for classification: 1. premiership points; 2. percentage; 3. points for
Average score: 92.0
Source: AFL Tables

== Finals series ==
=== Semi-finals ===
Home team	Score	Away team	Score	Venue	Crowd	Date
Footscray	10.16 (76)	Collingwood	18.9 (117)	MCG	68,556	3 September
Carlton	16.17 (113)	Geelong	10.21 (81)	MCG	65,332	10 September

=== Preliminary final ===
Home team	Score	Away team	Score	Venue	Crowd	Date
Geelong	14.14 (98)	Collingwood	21.9 (135)	MCG	60,956	17 September

=== Grand final ===
Home team	Score	Away team	Score	Venue	Crowd	Date
Carlton	15.10 (100)	Collingwood	13.7 (85)	MCG	96,486	24 September

== Season notes ==
- Geelong half-back flanker Jack Grant won the 1938 130-yard Stawell Gift in eleven and eleven-sixteenths seconds, off a handicap of 11½ yards.
- The VFL investigated an allegation from the Carlton Football Club that Collingwood rover Harry Collier had king-hit Carlton wingman Jack Carney (one of the smallest ever VFL players at 160 cm) as the teams left the field after the final bell of the Round 5 match at Victoria Park. Collier was suspended for the rest of the 1938 season.
- Jack Titus revealed that he had been offered £50 by a betting syndicate to play "dead" in Richmond's Round 8 match against South Melbourne. Richmond thrashed South Melbourne 20.15 (135) to 8.14 (62).
- Footscray becomes the first of the three teams who joined the league in 1925 to make the finals. North Melbourne would not make its first final appearance until 1945 and Hawthorn's first appearance came in 1957.
- With their win over Collingwood in Round 5, Carlton held an overall winning record against every other club in the competition. However, this would only last until Round 16 when the clubs next met, with Collingwood evening the record. With their Grand Final victory over the Magpies, Carlton once again had a winning record over every other club in combined regular season and finals matches. This would last until Round 8 of the following season, with Collingwood defeating Carlton to even their record.
- Four of the six games in Round 13 were decided by a one-point margin.

== Awards ==
- The 1938 VFL Premiership team was Carlton.
- The VFL's leading goalkicker was Ron Todd of Collingwood with 102 goals (120 after finals).
- The Argus newspaper's "Player of the Year", was shared between Norman Ware of Footscray and Marcus Boyall of Collingwood.
- The winner of the 1938 Brownlow Medal was Dick Reynolds of Essendon with 18 votes.
- South Melbourne took the "wooden spoon" in 1938.
- The seconds premiership was won by Geelong for the second consecutive season. Geelong 12.19 (91) defeated Footscray 12.8 (80) in the Grand Final, played as a stand-alone game on Thursday 29 September (Show Day holiday) at the Melbourne Cricket Ground, before a crowd of 5,500.

== Sources ==
- 1938 VFL season at AFL Tables
- 1938 VFL season at Australian Football
