= Phonse Kyne =

Australian rules footballer (1915–1985)

Personal information
- Full name: Alphonsus Edward Kyne
- Born: 29 October 1915; Trafalgar, Victoria
- Died: 8 April 1985 (aged 69); Kew, Victoria
- Original team: St Kevin's
- Height: 188 cm (6 ft 2 in)
- Weight: 86 kg (190 lb)

Playing career^{1}
Years	Club	Games (Goals)
1934–1950	Collingwood	245 (237)

Coaching career^{3}
Years	Club	Games (W–L–D)
1950–1963	Collingwood	272 (161–109–2)
- ^{1} Playing statistics correct to the end of 1950.^{3} Coaching statistics correct as of 1963.

Career highlights
- Collingwood premiership player 1935, 1936; Collingwood premiership coach 1953, 1958; Collingwood Team of the Century; Collingwood captain 1942, 1946–1949; Copeland Trophy 1946–1948

Alphonsus Edward "Phonse" Kyne (29 October 1915 – 8 April 1985) was an Australian rules footballer who played for and coached Collingwood in the Victorian Football League. He is an inductee of the Australian Football Hall of Fame and a member of the official Collingwood Team of the Century. Along with Allan La Fontaine, he is widely regarded as one of the two best footballers to graduate from St Kevin's College, Toorak.

== Playing career ==
A centre half-forward and ruckman during his playing career, Kyne was a member of Collingwood premiership sides in 1935 and 1936.

He won his first best and fairest in 1946, winning the award again the following two seasons to become the first player to win the Copeland Trophy three years in succession. Kyne had his first stint as captain in 1942 before being appointed to the role permanently from 1946 to 1949. He had served in the Australian Army (22nd Battalion) between 1942 and 1945.

A regular Victorian interstate representative, Kyne played a total of 11 games for the state and captaining them at the 1947 Hobart Carnival.

== Coaching career ==
In 1950, Kyne was appointed coach of Collingwood and took the field seven times that season before becoming a non-playing coach from 1951 onwards. His 272 games as coach is the second most by a Collingwood player, and he was a premiership-winning coach in 1953 and 1958.

== In popular culture ==
Collingwood historian Michael Roberts speculated that Kyne is one of three Collingwood footballers depicted in John Brack's 1953 painting Three of the Players.
