= 1945 Carlton Football Club season =

Carlton Football Club
1945 season
- President: Kenneth Luke
- Coach: Percy Bentley
- Captain: Bob Chitty
- Home ground: Carlton Oval
- VFL season: 4th (13–7–0)
- Finals series: Premiers
- Best and Fairest: Ron Savage
- Leading goalkicker: Lance Collins (49)
- Club membership: 5,335

The 1945 Carlton Football Club season was the Carlton Football Club's 82nd season of competition, and 49th as a member of the Victorian Football League. Carlton fielded teams in the senior and reserves grades of the 1945 VFL season.

Under coach Percy Bentley, Carlton recovered from a middling 3–6 start to win thirteen of its last fourteen games, winning the premiership by defeating South Melbourne in the grand final. It was the 7th senior VFL premiership in the club's history.

== Club summary ==
The 1945 VFL season was the 49th season of the VFL competition since its inception in 1897; and, having competed in every season, it was also the 49th season contested by the Carlton Football Club. As it had been since 1897, the club's home ground was Carlton Oval in Princes Park, North Carlton. In addition to its senior team, Carlton fielded a team in the VFL seconds. Its thirds (under-19s) team contested the Northern District Football Association, and development teams East Brunswick, Brunswick City and Prince's Hill contested the Victorian Junior Football League. The club reported 4,623 full 10/6 memberships and 712 5/- memberships (total 5,335), up from 3,936 and 489 (total 4,425) in 1944, but still short of its pre-war record membership of 7,700; but the club saw a profit of only £213, down from £503, owing to the new arrangements for pooling gate receipts across the league.

=== Senior personnel ===
Kenneth Luke continued as club president through 1945, a position he had held since the 1938 season. Harry Bell continued as the secretary, a role he had held since 1940.

Percy Bentley continued as coach, a role he had held since crossing from Richmond in 1941. Bob Chitty, in his ninth season with the club, was appointed the new captain of the club; he replaced 1944 acting-captain Bob Atkinson, who returned to captain his former VFA side Coburg. Bob Green was appointed vice-captain at the start of the year, then Rod McLean took over after Green was transferred on service.

== Squad and player statistics for 1945 ==
The following is the full list of players who were on the Carlton senior and supplementary lists through the 1945 season. Numbers in parentheses represent games played and goals kicked for Carlton during the season.

Carlton Football Club
Senior list		Supplementaries	Coaching staff
1 Ken Hands (18,24); 2 Ken Hopper (15,7); 3 Jack Bennett (23,3); 4 Alec Way (11,8); 5 Lance Collins (17,49); 6 Bob Chitty (21,1) (c); 7 Herb Turner (16,18); 8 Fred Fitzgibbon (18,0); 9 Wal Alexander (8,0); 10 Clinton Wines (20,7); 11 Ron Hines (20,12); 12 Doug Williams (21,0); 14 Rod McLean (18,10) (vc); 15 Vin Brown (23,0); 16 Jim Mooring (9,18); 17 Don Beauvais (4,5); 18 Arthur Sanger (23,0); 19 Adrian Hearn (3,5)	19 Frank McGrath (8,3); 21 Fred Rose (2,3); 21 Ken Baxter (13,27); 22 Jim Jones (2,0); 23 Bert Deacon (10,0); 24 Ron Savage (22,31); 25 Arthur Hall (3,1); 25 Jim Baird (17,8); 26 Jim Clark (22,1); 27 Cyril Mann (3,3); 29 Les Gregory (1,0); 30 Mick Price (21,32); 31 Charlie McInnes (13,8); 32 Bob Green (5,1) (vc); 33 Ernie Spence (0,0); 34 Bernie Bignell (3,0); 35 Jim Clapton (0,0)	5 Hal Hanton (2,0); 22 Bert Lucas (0,0); 28 Ron Boys (2,0); 35 Len Harris (0,0); A. Bridson (0,0); Jim Davies (0,0); Allan Greenshields (0,0); Alf Green (0,0); Ritchie Green (0,0); Jim Lanigan (0,0); R. Ritchie (0,0); G. Smith (0,0); L. Wade (0,0); Mac Wilson (0,0)	Head coach: Percy Bentley; Legend: (c) Captain(s); (vc) Vice-captain(s); Updated: {{{date}}} Source(s):

== Playing list changes ==
The following summarises key player transfers to and from the club between the conclusion of the 1944 season and the conclusion of the 1945 season.

World War II was still ongoing during the season, so the availability of players who were in the military would depend on where they were posted; players who were temporarily gained or lost by the club due to military service are included here. Additionally, the Victorian Football Association returned to competition after three years' recess, and VFA players who had played for Carlton during the war on wartime permits automatically became VFA players; these players needed to be re-cleared to the VFL before resuming with Carlton.

In

- Bernie Bignell (returned from service)
- Jim Clapton (from Coburg)
- Hal Hanton (from service and Frankston)
- Adrian Hearn (from Fitzroy)
- Ron Hines (returned from service)
- Jim Jones (returned from service)
- Cyril Mann (returned from service)
- Fred Rose (from services and Sea Lake)
- Arthur Hall (from Fitzroy, after Round 1)
- Ken Hands (from North Geelong, and cleared from Geelong's zone after Round 3)
- Frank McGrath (from Melbourne, after Round 3)
- Lance Collins (returned from service to Coburg, then cleared back to Carlton after Round 5)
- Ken Baxter, (returned from service after Round 11)
- Bert Deacon (returned from service to Preston, then cleared back to Carlton after Round 13)

Out

- Bob Atkinson (to Coburg)
- Frank Anderson (to Preston)
- Bert Butler (to Bacchus Marsh)
- Jack Conley (away on service)
- Ollie Grieve (away on service)
- Ern Henfry (away on service, then returned to Perth)
- Jack Howell (away on service)
- Les McCann (away on service)
- Ken McLean (away on service)
- Les Marden (to Coburg)
- Paul Schmidt (to Devonport)
- Ted Tuohill (retired)
- Jack Wrout (retired)
- Kevin Brown (to Geelong, after Round 3)
- Cyril Mann (to Brunswick, after Round 5)
- Bob Green (transferred on service after Round 7)
- Les Gregory (to Preston, after Round 9)
- Adrian Hearn (to Brunswick, after Round 10)

Other players who were already playing with the Carlton seconds, but who were elevated and made their senior debuts in 1945 were Wal Alexander, Clinton Wines and Don Beauvais. Carlton also notably signed up Jim Davies from Swan Districts, who had won the 1944 Sandover Medal in the under-age WANFL competition; but he was transferred away from Melbourne on service before playing a game and returned to Swan Districts in 1946. He later returned to Carlton in 1949.

== Season summary ==
=== Home and away season ===
The club entered the home-and-away season with an overall inexperienced team, noted as speedy but lacking in big, experienced key position players. The highly regarded half-backline combination of 1943 had suffered with the loss of Jim Francis to retirement and Frank Anderson to Preston, and Bob Atkinson had also been lost from the back pocket, leaving Bob Chitty as the only established key defender. A total of 18 players from the 1944 list were unavailable. Carlton also had a limited preseason, due in part to the Carlton Cricket Club occupying the ground later than usual as it won its first district cricket pennant (albeit in the unofficial wartime competition); simultaneous intra-club matches were played at 2:45 Saturday 7 April at Princes Park and Ransford Oval, then again at 2:45 Saturday 14 April at Princes Park and McAllister Oval. As a result, sportswriters did not have high expectations of Carlton for the season.

As such, few were surprised when Carlton's season opened poorly, with three comfortable losses, including a club record 100-point defeat at the hands of Essendon, to sit last on the ladder. The club was described as "surely the weakest Carlton team sent out in years", and it was again noted that the small players were reasonable but the lack of key position players was a major problem. After the early losses, Carlton started rebuilding, adopting something of a youth policy; no fewer than eight older but underperforming players – Bernie Bignell, Les Gregory, Arthur Hall, Adrian Hearn, Jim Jones, Cyril Mann, Fred Rose, and vice captain Bob Green – were omitted by the end of Round 6; among them, only Jones ever played for Carlton again.

Carlton improved over the following six weeks, with three wins and three losses, to move to 9th place with a 3–6 record overall. The three wins were all good wins against Fitzroy, St Kilda, and Geelong (who were all in the bottom six after Round 9), and the losses came against Richmond, Collingwood and Footscray (who were all in the top five after Round 9). The Round 7 game against Richmond was almost won: holding a one-point lead, Frank McGrath had taken a saving mark in defence, before played on and being caught dropping the ball, Richmond's Bob Bawden kicked the winning goal from the free kick, which was the last kick of the game.

Recruits of star key position players as the season progressed strengthened the Carlton team down the spine. The Blues recruited 18-year-old Geelong junior Ken Hands after Round 3, who made an immediate impression at centre half forward, and was touted as a future champion by the press within a month. Coburg key position player Lance Collins, who had played for Carlton on a wartime permit, was cleared back to Carlton after Round 5; and, after making little impact at pivot, was moved to full forward and led the club in goalkicking for the season. Star forward Ken Baxter returned from three years of active service after Round 11. Finally, Bert Deacon, another VFA player who had played with the club on a wartime permit, was cleared to the club after Round 13, immediately became one of the league's best players, holding down the centre half-back position and giving the Blues the best half-back line in the league. This, coupled with Vin Brown serviceably adapting to his new position at full back, gradually turned Carlton into one of the league's strongest teams through the second half of the season, with strength in both key positions and small players. The line-up became very settled, with very selection changes made in the last two months of the season.

This translated into a remarkable improvement in results starting with wins against fourth-placed North Melbourne and first-placed South Melbourne in Rounds 10 and 11. After four straight wins which had seen the club rise to 7th place, Carlton suffered an upset loss against an out-of-form Essendon, which itself had lost six straight games, in a dramatic ending in which Essendon kicked three goals in the final two minutes of the game to snatch a three-point with only 13 seconds left. Sportswriters noted that this loss would likely end the Blues' faint hopes of playing finals, as they were two wins and percentage behind fourth place with six games left.

However, Carlton's performances continued to strengthen. Over the next five weeks, it recorded narrow wins against finals rivals Fitzroy, Collingwood and Richmond and big wins against the bottom two St Kilda and Geelong, to rise to fifth place. This set up, for the second consecutive year, a final round clash against third placed Footscray, the winner of which would qualify for the finals.^{Note} Footscray had won the equivalent match in 1944 by one point, kicked after the siren by Harry Hickey; but this year, in front of a then-record crowd of 30,000 at the Western Oval, Carlton dominated with a seven-goals-to-two first quarter before winning by 53 points. This saw Carlton enter the top four for the first time in the season, in fourth place with a 13–7 record, after winning ten of its last eleven home-and-away matches.

**Round**	**Date and local time**	**Opponent**	**Scores** (Carlton's scores indicated in **bold**)			**Venue**	**Attendance**	**Ladder** **position**
**Round**	**Date and local time**	**Opponent**	Home	Away	Result	**Venue**	**Attendance**	**Ladder** **position**
1	Saturday, 21 April (2:45 pm)	Melbourne	**13.9 (87)**	15.18 (108)	Lost by 21 points	Carlton Oval	13,000	8th
2	Saturday, 28 April (2:45 pm)	Hawthorn	16.10 (106)	**9.18 (72)**	Lost by 34 points	Glenferrie Oval	10,000	10th
3	Saturday, 5 May (2:45 pm)	Essendon	22.18 (150)	**7.8 (50)**	Lost by 100 points	Essendon Recreation Reserve	15,000	12th
4	Saturday, 12 May (2:45 pm)	Fitzroy	**12.12 (84)**	11.11 (77)	Won by 7 points	Carlton Oval	10,000	11th
5	Saturday, 19 May (2:45 pm)	St Kilda	**12.18 (90)**	11.13 (79)	Won by 11 points	Carlton Oval	9,400	8th
6	Saturday, 26 May (2:45 pm)	Collingwood	15.18 (108)	**12.11 (83)**	Lost by 25 points	Victoria Park	17,700	9th
7	Saturday, 2 June (2:45 pm)	Richmond	13.16 (94)	**12.17 (89)**	Lost by 5 points	Carlton Oval	21,000	9th
8	Saturday, 9 June (2:45 pm)	Geelong	10.9 (69)	**14.21 (105)**	Won by 36 points	Kardinia Park	11,200	9th
9	Saturday, 16 June (2:45 pm)	Footscray	**11.11 (77)**	11.20 (86)	Lost by 9 points	Carlton Oval	20,000	9th
10	Saturday, 23 June (2:45 pm)	North Melbourne	7.17 (59)	**12.12 (84)**	Won by 35 points	Arden Street Oval	15,000	9th
11	Saturday, 30 June (2:45 pm)	South Melbourne	**8.8 (56)**	7.8 (50)	Won by 6 points	Carlton Oval	25,250	9th
12	Saturday, 7 July (2:45 pm)	Melbourne	12.8 (80)	**12.9 (81)**	Won by 1 point	Punt Road Oval	12,000	7th
13	Saturday, 14 July (2:45 pm)	Hawthorn	**13.12 (90)**	8.11 (59)	Won by 31 points	Carlton Oval	10,250	7th
14	Saturday, 21 July (2:45 pm)	Essendon	**11.9 (75)**	10.18 (78)	Lost by 3 points	Carlton Oval	13,875	7th
15	Saturday,28 July (2:45 pm)	Fitzroy	7.12 (54)	**9.4 (58)**	Won by 4 points	Brunswick Street Oval	20,000	7th
16	Saturday, 4 August (2:45 pm)	St Kilda	7.15 (57)	**11.13 (79)**	Won by 22 points	St Kilda Cricket Ground	10,000	6th
17	Saturday, 11 August (2:45 pm)	Collingwood	**13.11 (89)**	13.5 (83)	Won by 6 points	Carlton Oval	25,000	6th
18	Saturday, 18 August (2:45 pm)	Richmond	12.9 (81)	**13.15 (93)**	Won by 12 points	Punt Road Oval	38,000	5th
19	Saturday, 25 August (2:45 pm)	Geelong	**23.23 (161)**	9.13 (67)	Won by 94 points	Carlton Oval	9,000	5th
20	Saturday, 1 September (2:45 pm)	Footscray	8.14 (62)	**16.19 (115)**	Won by 53 points	Western Oval	30,000	4th

=== Ladder ===
**(P)**	Premiers
	Qualified for finals

#	Team	P	W	L	D	PF	PA	%	Pts
1	South Melbourne	20	16	4	0	1840	1396	131.8	64
2	Collingwood	20	15	5	0	1902	1477	128.8	60
3	North Melbourne	20	13	7	0	1696	1526	111.1	52
4	Carlton **(P)**	20	13	7	0	1718	1607	106.9	52
5	Footscray	20	12	8	0	1717	1576	108.9	48
6	Fitzroy	20	11	8	1	1730	1452	119.1	46
7	Richmond	20	11	9	0	1802	1742	103.4	44
8	Essendon	20	10	9	1	1837	1614	113.8	42
9	Melbourne	20	8	12	0	1683	1699	99.1	32
10	Hawthorn	20	6	14	0	1665	1944	85.6	24
11	Geelong	20	2	18	0	1415	2180	64.9	8
12	St Kilda	20	2	18	0	1305	2097	62.2	8

Rules for classification: 1. premiership points; 2. percentage; 3. points for
Average score: 84.6
Source: AFL Tables

=== Finals series ===
The finals series was staged at Carlton Oval, as a result of the Melbourne Cricket Ground once again being unavailable due to its role in the war effort. Carlton had staged the 1942 and 1943 finals, and the St Kilda Cricket Ground had staged the 1944 finals; but lower capacity and attendance at St Kilda encouraged the league to return the finals to Carlton for 1945. Additional terraces were installed at the ground in August, to increase the official capacity to 62,800.

Despite being in fourth place, Carlton's strong form in the second half of the season meant they were considered a genuine premiership threat by sportswriters. Through the latter stages of the season and into the finals, coach Percy Bentley conducted very limited Thursday training sessions, to reduce the pressure to the team which had played in so many consecutive matches which, had they been defeated, would have ended their chances at reaching the top four.

Carlton faced third-placed North Melbourne in the first semi-final, which was in its first ever VFL finals series, and whose late season form had been a little bit patchy. Carlton dominated the game and won easily. Although the final margin was only 26 points, Carlton had led 13.7 (85) to 2.13 (25) at three-quarter time, before North Melbourne added respectability to the scoreboard with a six-goals-to-one final quarter. Lance Collins scored a VFL career-high eight goals in the match.

The preliminary final against Collingwood, was a vicious, and famous affair. Collingwood was by far the better team throughout the game, with Carlton not playing as well as it had been; Hands and Deacon both had rare off games. Collingwood held a 28-point lead at quarter time, a 9-point lead at half-time, and opened up a game-high 34-point lead after kicking the first goal of the final quarter. At the same time, the Blues engaged in rough play to try to put their smaller Collingwood opponents off their game, and melee involving twelve players broke out early in the final quarter. After the melee, Carlton mounted a massive comeback, and kicked the next five goals in a fifteen-minute purple patch, to reduce the margin to two points. Then Lance Collins, who had kicked the first goal of the rally, was again the hero, kicking the last two goals of the game late to steal a ten-point win. The roughness of the game drew condemnation, but only one player – Fred Fitzgibbon – was reported and suspended.

Carlton faced minor premiers South Melbourne in the grand final. Played in blustery, then rainy conditions, it was a low quality and rough game better remembered for its violence than its gameplay, and eventually gaining its nickname "the Bloodbath" from the several melees which broke out. The game was closely fought through the first half, Carlton holding a two-point lead at half time. Carlton pulled away with a five-goals-to-two the third quarter to lead by 23 points at three-quarter time, and managed to keep at least a two-goal buffer through the rough final quarter before winning by a game-high 28 points. Three Carlton players were suspended: captain Bob Chitty and Don Grossman for eight weeks, and Fred Fitzgibbon – who was already suspended after the preliminary final and who ran onto the ground from the outer to join a melee – for four weeks. Four South Melbourne players were also suspended. Bob Chitty's strikes behind play of two of South Melbourne's young stars were the main instigators of the game's violence, and – by the later admission of South Melbourne star Laurie Nash – successfully did much to distract South Melbourne from its game in the second half. Vin Brown was the best player on the ground, and the win gave Carlton its seventh premiership.

**Week**	**Date and local time**	**Opponent**	**Scores** (Carlton's scores indicated in **bold**)			**Venue**	**Attendance**
**Week**	**Date and local time**	**Opponent**	Home	Away	Result	**Venue**	**Attendance**
First semi-final	Saturday, 8 September (2:45 pm)	North Melbourne	8.20 (68)	**14.10 (94)**	Won by 26 points	Carlton Oval	54,846
Preliminary Final	Saturday, 22 September (2:45 pm)	Collingwood	12.8 (80)	**13.12 (90)**	Won by 10 points	Carlton Oval	41,305
Grand Final	Saturday, 29 September (2:45 pm)	South Melbourne	10.15 (75)	**15.13 (103)**	Won by 28 points	Carlton Oval	62,986

== Premiership team ==
The Carlton premiership nineteen was as below. Among them, five players – Bob Chitty, Rod McLean, Ken Baxter, Mick Price and Charlie McInnes – had previously played in the club's 1938 premiership win. McInnes was the reserve in both games.

Carlton
B:	Arthur Sanger	Vin Brown	Jim Baird
HB:	Bob Chitty (c)	Bert Deacon	Jim Clark
C:	Doug Williams	Clinton Wines	Herb Turner
HF:	Alec Way	Ken Hands	Lance Collins
F:	Rod McLean	Ken Baxter	Jim Mooring
Foll:	Ron Savage	Jack Bennett	Mick Price
Res:	Charlie McInnes		
Coach:	Percy Bentley		

Fred Fitzgibbon was missing from the premiership team, after having been suspended for four matches for striking Collingwood's Len Hustler in the preliminary final; McInnes came into the team as 19th man to replace him. Three players had been injured in the preliminary final and were doubtful for the grand final: Jim Baird (concussion), Ron Hines (thigh) and Ron Savage (rib). Of them, only Hines failed to recover and he was omitted on the morning of the match, replaced by Alec Way as the emergency.

The premiership players each received a silver teaset valued at ten guineas from the club as a reward.

== Leading goalkickers ==
Despite coming to the club only after Round 5, and initially being recruited to play centre, Lance Collins ultimately moved to the forward-line and was Carlton's leading goalkicker for the season. It was the only time Collins won the award, in what was the only of Collins' three seasons with Carlton in which he played more than ten games.

Player	Goals
Lance Collins	49
Mick Price	32
Ron Savage	31
Ken Baxter	27
Ken Hands	24

== Team awards and records ==
Game records

- Round 3 – Carlton's 100-point loss against Essendon set a new club record for the heaviest defeat in its history, breaking the previous record of 94 points set in 1904.
- Round 3 – As of 2023, Carlton's 100-point loss holds the record for the heaviest loss in a match by a season's eventual premiers.

Season records

- Carlton became the first club to win the VFL premiership from fourth place on the ladder under the Page–McIntyre system, and the first under any system since Fitzroy's 1916 premiership from fourth place under the Argus finals system.

== Individual awards and records ==
Robert Reynolds Trophy

The Robert Reynolds Trophy for Carlton's senior best and fairest was awarded to ruckman Ron Savage. It was Savage's first and only best-and-fairest for the club, won in his eighth and final year with the club. Ken Baxter, despite playing only thirteen games after his return from service, finished second.

Other awards presented by the club were:

- Arthur Sanger – most consistent
- Vin Brown – most improved
- Bert Deacon – most serviceable
- Clinton Wines – best first year player
- Ken Hands – most promising
- Rod McLean and Mick Price – best team men
- Lance Collins – inspiring play
- Jim Baird – consistent play
- Doug Williams – improved play
- Jack Bennett – special efforts

Representative honours

- One Carlton player – Ron Savage – was selected for Victoria for the interstate match against South Australia on 7 July. Selection policies dictated that two players would be selected from each of the top eight clubs, and one from each of the bottom four – which was where Carlton was positioned at the time of selection.
- Two Carlton players – Ron Hines and Jim Clark – represented the North-of-the-Yarra team in the charity match against South-of-the-Yarra on Monday 18 June. Two others – Ken Hands, Ron Savage – were selected in the team but withdrew due to injury.

Other

- Percy Beames of the Age named Bert Deacon as the most outstanding player in league football for the year, despite having played only ten games for the year, ahead of Des Fothergill (Collingwood). Described him as "great versatility and sustained brilliance through each game", and "perhaps the best key player since the early days of L. Nash".

== Seconds ==
The Carlton seconds team finished sixth out of twelve teams with a win–loss record of 12–8, two games and percentage outside the final four.

== Footnotes ==
1. Footscray could still have played finals with a loss against Carlton if North Melbourne had also lost in Round 20. North Melbourne ultimately defeated Essendon by six points, kicking the winning goal inside the final minute, resulting in Footscray's elimination.
