= Carlton Football Club premierships =

The Carlton Football Club has been involved in 29 VFL/AFL Grand Finals from 1897-2006, winning 16 premiership titles.

== Notable Grand Finals ==
=== 1945: The Bloodbath ===
An infamous battle between Carlton and South Melbourne (now Sydney Swans), in which the game became footbrawl rather than football. It is the most bloodiest and toughest grand final of all time with the reporting and suspension of ten footballers from both teams. Fights went on all day with several players being knocked out, involving umpires, police, trainers, and spectators, all fighting on the field. Princes Park in Melbourne had 63,000 spectators screaming for blood. Carlton won by 28 points with the following ten players being reported:

- Ted Whitfield (South), found guilty and suspended for the entire 1946 season.
- Jack "Basher" Williams (South), found guilty and suspended for twelve weeks.
- Captain Herbie Matthews (South), found guilty and severely reprimanded.
- Keith Smith (South), found not guilty.
- Don Grossman (South), found guilty and suspended for eight weeks.
- Jim Cleary (South), found guilty and suspended for eight weeks.
- Ken Hands (Carlton), found not guilty.
- Captain Bob Chitty (Carlton), found guilty and suspended for eight weeks.
- Ron Savage (Carlton), found guilty and suspended for eight weeks.
- Fred Fitzgibbon (Carlton), an already suspended player, found guilty and suspended for a further four weeks for running onto the field and joining in numerous brawls.

=== 1970: The Great Comeback ===
The most famous Grand Final of all time took place in 1970 before a record crowd of 121,000 people at the Melbourne Cricket Ground (MCG) who watched Carlton take on Collingwood. At half-time, the Blues were 44 points behind (nearly 8 goals) and the game seemed all but over, with a victory seeming a certainty for mighty Collingwood. At the half-time break, legendary Carlton coach Ron Barassi blasted his players with a frightening tirade of verbal abuse, pushing and motivating his team to concentrate on handpassing and short kicks - a strategy that worked wonders. In the second half of the game...the tide had turned...and the Blues came storming home. At the time-on stage in the last quarter with the final siren about to go off at any second, the Blues were still two points behind, then suddenly two quick goals - one from Crosswell and another from Alex Jesaulenko - saw Carlton in front by ten points. The clock was ticking...suddenly...the siren sounded...the game was over...Carlton...had snatched victory from the jaws of defeat. There was nothing...absolutely nothing...but euphoria for the Carltonians...the MCG was shaking...the whole world and the skies were painted Navy Blue.

During the game, the football world was inspired by one of the most famous marks in VFL/AFL history. Towards the end of the second quarter David McKay kicked it to the wing and Jesaulenko soared high into the sky on the shoulders of Collingwood's ruckman Graeme "Jerker" Jenkins, a giant of a man at 6'6", and took the heaven-high-grab with his hands out in front of his face. The commentator, Mike Williamson, spoke the infamous words "McKay, to the wing position on the member's stand side, OH JESAULENKO! YOU BEAUTY!" The mark symbolises Carlton famous victory over Collingwood in this Grand Final.

For 37 years this Grand Final victory stood as the greatest comeback in Carlton's history, until the 2007 season when the record was broken by an impressive win from 48 points down in the Round 3 clash against Essendon. It is fitting that Carlton's two greatest comeback wins are against its two fiercest rivals.

== Premiership teams ==
Source: Graeme Atkinson, "The COURAGE book of VFL Finals 1897 - 1973", Wren Publishing Pty Ltd & Courage Breweries Ltd, 1973. ISBN 0-85885-152-0.

(C) = Captain, (NSM) = Norm Smith Medallist.

1906 The First of Many: The first Carlton Premiership Team - Defeated Fitzroy Football Club
B:	Clark	Gillespie	Beck
HB:	Payne	Johnson	Hammond
C:	Bruce	McGregor	Kennedy
HF:	Caine	Marchbank	Grace
F:	Lang	Topping	Little
Foll:	Flynn (C)	Jinks	Elliot
Coach:	Jack Worrall		

1907 Premiership Team: The first double - Defeated South Melbourne Football Club now Sydney Swans Football Club
B:	Clark	Gillespie	Beck
HB:	Gotz	Flynn (C)	Payne
C:	Bruce	Ingleman	Kennedy
HF:	Jinks	Kelly	Caine
F:	Grace	Topping	Harris
Foll:	Johnson	Hammond	Lang
Coach:	Jack Worrall		

1908 Premiership Team: The First three-in-a-row in the VFL/AFL - Defeated Essendon Football Club
B:	Clark	Beck	Ford
HB:	Flynn	Payne	Jinks
C:	Bruce	McGregor	Kennedy
HF:	Lang	Marchbank	Gotz
F:	Kelly	Gardiner	Topping
Foll:	Johnson	Hammond	Elliot (C)
Coach:	Jack Worrall. Note: This was the first premiership team not containing a single first year player.		

1914 Premiership Team Defeated South Melbourne Football Club now Sydney Swans Football Club
B:	O'Brien	Jamieson	McDonald
HB:	Leehane	Dick (C)	Haughton
C:	Baud	McGregor	Brown
HF:	Lowe	Cook	Daykin
F:	Fisher	Green	Burleigh
Foll:	Calwell	Hammond	Morris
Coach:	N Clark		

1915 Premiership Team: Another Double - Defeated Collingwood Football Club
B:	O'Brien	Jamieson	McDonald
HB:	Baud (C)	Robinson	Brown
C:	Morris	McGregor	Challis*
HF:	Burleigh	Daykin	Fisher
F:	Green	Gardiner	Sharp
Foll:	Hammond	Haugton	Valentine
Coach:	N Clark. *Note Challis was killed in WWI		

1938 Premiership Team Defeated Collingwood Football Club
B:	McIntyre	Gill	Park*
HB:	Chitty	Francis	Anderson
C:	Green	Crisp	Carney
HF:	Vallence	Wrout	Schmidt
F:	McLean	Baxter	Price
Foll:	Diggins (C)	Hollingshead	Hale
Int:	McInnes		
Coach:	Brighton Diggins. *Note Jim Park was killed in WWII		

1945 Premiership Team: The Bloodbath - Defeated South Melbourne Football Club now Sydney Swans Football Club
B:	Sanger	Brown	Baird
HB:	Chitty (C)	Deacon	Clark
C:	Turner	Wines	Williams
HF:	Collins	Hands	Way
F:	McLean	Baxter	Mooring
Foll:	Savage	Bennett	Price
Int:	McInnes		
Coach:	Perce Bentley		

1947 Premiership Team Defeated Essendon Football Club
B:	Green	Grieve	Bailey
HB:	Brown	Deacon	Clark
C:	Williams	Henfry (C)	Fitzgibbon
HF:	Stafford	Hands	Garby
F:	Davies	Baird	Turner
Foll:	Howell	Bennett	Conley
Int:	Baxter	Greensheilds	
Coach:	Perce Bentley		

1968 Premiership Team Defeated Essendon Football Club
B:	Collins	Lofts	Walls
HB:	Gill	Goold	Hall
C:	Crane	Crosswell	Robertson
HF:	Jesaulenko	Bennett	Quirk
F:	Munari	Kekovich	Jones
Foll:	Nicholls (C)	Silvagni	Gallagher
Int:	Chandler	McLean	
Coach:	Ron Barassi		

1970 Premiership Team: The Great Comeback - Defeated Collingwood Football Club
B:	Gill	Hall	Waite
HB:	Goold	McKay	Mulcair
C:	Crane	Robertson	Pinnell
HF:	Crosswell	Walls	Jackson
F:	Jones	Jesaulenko	Thornley
Foll:	Nicholls (C)	Silvagni	Gallagher
Int:	Hopkins	Chandler	
Coach:	Ron Barassi		

1972 Premiership Team Defeated Richmond Football Club
B:	O'Connell	Southby	McKay
HB:	Waite	Doull	Hurst
C:	Robertson	Armstrong	Dickson
HF:	Chandler	Walls	Jackson
F:	Nicholls (C)	Jesaulenko	Keogh
Foll:	Jones	Hall	Gallagher
Int:	Lukas	Crane	
Coach:	John Nicholls		

1979 Premiership Team Defeated Collingwood Football Club
B:	Harmes (NSM)	Southby	McKay
HB:	Klomp	Doull	McConville
C:	Francis	Jesaulenko (C)	Young
HF:	Keogh	Maclure	Johnston
F:	Fitzpatrick	Brown	Sheldon
Foll:	Jones	Armstrong	Buckley
Int:	Austin	Marcou	
Coach:	Alex Jesaulenko		

1981 Premiership Team Defeated Collingwood Football Club
B:	English	Howell	Perovic
HB:	Harmes	Doull (NSM)	Hunter
C:	Maylin	Wells	Glascott
HF:	Bosustow	Maclure	Johnston
F:	Buckley	McKay	McConville
Foll:	Fitzpatrick (C)	Sheldon	Ashman
Int:	Bortolotto	Marcou	
Coach:	David Parkin		

1982 Premiership Team Defeated Richmond Football Club
B:	English	Bortolotto	Perovic
HB:	Klomp	Doull	Hunter
C:	Harmes	Buckley	Glascott
HF:	Bosustow	Maclure	Johnston
F:	Marcou	Ditchburn	McConville
Foll:	Fitzpatrick (C)	Maylin	Ashman
Int:	Jones	Sheldon	
Coach:	David Parkin		

1987 Premiership Team Defeated Hawthorn Football Club
B:	Aitken	Silvagni	Glascott
HB:	Alvin	Rhys-Jones (NSM)	Dean
C:	Robertson	Bradley	Kennedy
HF:	Hunter	Kernahan (C)	Dennis
F:	Meldrum	Dorotich	Naley
Foll:	Madden	Johnston	Murphy
Int:	Gleeson	McKenzie	
Coach:	Robert Walls		

1995 Premiership Team Defeated Geelong Football Club
B:	Hogg	Silvagni	Sexton
HB:	Christou	Dean	McKay
C:	Koutoufides	Ratten	Hanna
HF:	Rice	Spalding	Clape
F:	Pearce	Kernahan (C)	Williams (NSM)
Foll:	Madden	Bradley	Brown
Int:	Camporeale	Manton	Whitehead
Coach:	David Parkin		
