= 1945 VFL grand final =

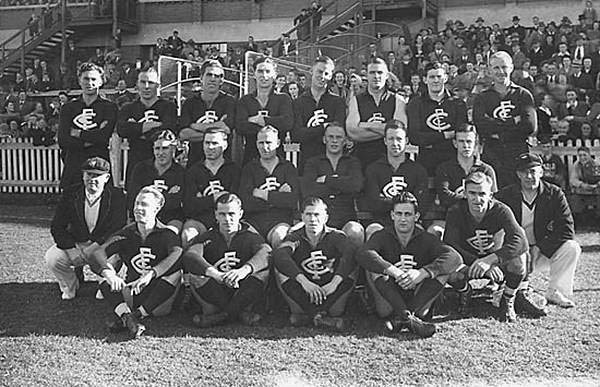

Carlton	South Melbourne
15.13 (103)	10.15 (75)
	1	2	3	4
CAR	2.4 (16)	7.5 (47)	12.9 (81)	15.13 (103)
SM	0.5 (5)	6.9 (45)	8.10 (58)	10.15 (75)
- Date: 29 September 1945
- Stadium: Princes Park
- Attendance: 62,986

The 1945 VFL grand final was an Australian rules football game contested between the South Melbourne Football Club and Carlton Football Club, held at Princes Park in Melbourne on 29 September 1945. It was the 47th annual grand final of the Victorian Football League, staged to determine the premiers for the 1945 VFL season. The match, attended by 62,986 spectators, was won by Carlton by a margin of 28 points, marking that club's seventh premiership victory.

The game was noted and remembered for its rough play and a number of violent incidents, out of which seven players were suspended. It has continued to be remembered as one of the roughest games in the league's history, giving rise to its nickname, the Bloodbath.

== Background ==
Played only shortly after the conclusion of the second World War, the 1945 grand final was the first played in peace time since 1938. The league's normal finals venue, the Melbourne Cricket Ground, remained unavailable as it was still set up for military use, as it had been for the previous four years. As in 1942 and 1943, the league opted to play the finals series, including the grand final, at Carlton's home venue, Princes Park, preferring it to the lower capacity St Kilda Cricket Ground which had hosted in 1944. Additional terraces were installed at the ground during August, to increase the official capacity to 62,800. The gates were closed at the opening bounce with an official attendance of 62,986, which is an enduring record attendance for the venue.

South Melbourne finished the home-and-away season as minor premiers with a 16–4 record, having sat atop the ladder continuously since Round 3. The club qualified for the grand final with an 11-point win against Collingwood in the second semi-final. It was the club's first grand final appearance since it had contested four in a row from 1933 to 1936.

In contrast, Carlton's season had commenced with three straight losses, and the club sat 9th with a 3–6 record after nine rounds. But, it won nine of its last ten home-and-away matches to qualify for the finals in fourth place with a 13–7 record. The club had a dominant win against North Melbourne in the first semi final, leading by as much as 60 points before winning by 26. Then, in a rough and violent preliminary final against Collingwood, Carlton staged a huge comeback, trailing by 34 points early in the final quarter before kicking the last seven goals to win by ten points. It was Carlton's first grand final appearance since its victory in 1938.

== Game summary ==
=== First quarter ===
Bob Chitty won the toss for Carlton and kicked with the breeze to the Lygon St end of the ground. Weather conditions to start the game were dry but blustery, and the quality of play was poor, with many players fumbling and few marks taken. Carlton had the most attacking chances through the first part of the quarter, and Ken Baxter scored Carlton's first goal from a turnover. After fifteen minutes of play, Carlton scored again, Price converting a free kick from 60 metres. South Melbourne had several attacking chances over the rest of the quarter, but managed only behinds; and, at quarter time, Carlton held an 11-point advantage, 2.4 (16) to 0.5 (5).

Overall, South Melbourne had the better of the first quarter, holding Carlton's advantage with the wind and limiting the Blues' attacking opportunities, but Carlton's backline was strong to keep South Melbourne goalless. Carlton half-forward flanker Lance Collins injured his ankle during the quarter, and he moved to the forward-line where he had little impact.

=== Second quarter ===
Ken Hands kicked the first goal of the second quarter to extend Carlton's advantage, before repeated South Melbourne attacks with the wind and smart play saw South kick the game's next four goals – to Keith Smith after capitalising on a fumble by Carlton defender Arthur Sanger, then Laurie Nash who collected a long kick which flew over the marking pack, then Reg Richards, and finally Vic Castles who roved a boundary throw-in. Baxter kicked a goal for Carlton from a scrimmage, then Castles kicked his second goal in open play to restore South Melbourne's 7-point advantage, 5.6 (36) to 4.5 (29).

At this point, two incidents broke out. South Melbourne's youngest player, 17-year-old Ron Clegg, was knocked down by Bob Chitty, unsighted by the umpire; Carlton's Rod McLean and South Melbourne's Jack Williams shaped up as if to fight, before umpire Spokes broke them up and reported Williams. Then, Chitty knocked down South Melbourne's next youngest player, 19-year-old Bill Williams, and was this time reported. South Melbourne attacked first after the stoppage, but managed only two behinds, before Carlton kicked three consecutive goals from general play – by Jim Mooring, Jack Bennett and Mick Price – to take an eight-point lead shortly before half time.

After the goal, another incident broke out after Carlton's youngest player, 18-year-old Ken Hands, was knocked down behind play. Carlton players remonstrated with Jack Williams, and Spokes once again held up play as police entered the arena to assist with breaking up the fight. No players were reported in the fracas, and South Melbourne's Brian Kelly limped from the ground with a cartilage injury, replaced by Ron Hartridge. With players still out of position following the restart of play, South Melbourne cleared and Vic Castles scored his third goal of the quarter straight off the centre bounce, right before the half time bell. Carlton led by two points, 7.5 (47) to 6.9 (45).

Clearly divergent tactics had emerged, with Carlton utilising its strong spine by playing long and direct down the congested centre of the ground, and South Melbourne utilising the less congested wings and flanks to attack with a shorter passing game.

=== Third quarter ===
Heavy rain began falling at half time, and fell throughout most of the remainder of the game. At half time, Carlton substituted the injured Collins for Charlie McInnes. Hands, who was concussed after the incident near half time and had to be helped from the ground, returned to the game, but was unable to remember much of the game after it was finished.

South Melbourne scored the first goal of the quarter, Nash kicking a set shot from a short pass, to give South Melbourne a four-point lead. Carlton then took control, scoring the next 27 points in the game. Hands kicked his second goal, then Ron Savage kicked one from a tight scrimmage at the goal face, then Hands scored again from a spilled pack mark. When Price kicked his third goal, Carlton had extended the advantage to 23 points. Alan Linden scored a goal for South Melbourne from a holding the ball free kick, but this was soon after answered by Carlton's Jim Mooring. Kicking five goals to two in the quarter, Carlton went to three quarter time ahead by 23 points, 12.9 (81) to 8.10 (58).

Carlton took firm control of the play in the quarter, playing more surely and with less fumbling than in the first half despite the conditions. On the other hand, South Melbourne's shorter passing game was less effective in the rain. The play remained rough, but there were no serious incidents during the quarter.

=== Final quarter ===
Rain continued to fall. As the quarter began, Chitty was put down in an incident with Nash; Spokes again held up play and police entered the field to break up any potential disturbance. Carlton kicked an early behind, before South Melbourne rebounded from the kick-in ending in Alan Linden's second goal. South attacked strongly, but after ten minutes, Carlton's Clinton Wines kicked a goal after catching Don Grossman holding the ball, and the margin was extended back to 23 points.

Soon after, the game's biggest melee erupted: Mooring was put down by Grossman, and Clegg was put down by Hands before multiple players, trainers and spectators joined the fray; among the spectators was Carlton's Fred Fitzgibbon, who was in the outer having been suspended for striking in the preliminary final. Police attempted to break up the melee, and also removed Fitzgibbon from the arena, while the umpires made reports. Within the fight, South Melbourne live wire Ted Whitfield was reported for attempting to strike goal umpire Les Whyte; and, as the umpires reported him, he lifted his guernsey and ran away to attempt to conceal his number. Spokes once again held up play until the melee finished.

South Melbourne attacked strongly to mount an attempted comeback in the aftermath of the melee, but managed only 1.3 from four easy shots, the only goal scored by Smith from a scrimmage at the boundary line. The margin was down to 16 points, before a Carlton attack was marked by Hands, who was put down again after the mark, this time by Jim Cleary. Players and police converged again, and Cleary was reported. Carlton still led by only 16 points with seven minutes remaining, before late goals to Chitty and Baxter put the game beyond South Melbourne's reach. When the final bell rung, Carlton won by a game-high margin of 28 points, 15.13 (103) to 10.15 (75).

Overall, the game was considered a poor exhibition of football, with inclement weather, weak skills, rough play and melees. Sportswriters praised the play of both teams' defences, and Carlton full-back Vin Brown was considered the best player on the ground for his consistent work in repelling the South Melbourne attacks. Ted Whitfield was South's best player.

== The Bloodbath ==
The roughness of play, and the high number of reports, suspensions and melees, drew heavy comment from sportswriters and public at the time. In more recent years, the game has come to be nicknamed the Bloodbath due to its violent reputation. In all, nine players were reported on fourteen charges during the game. Bottles were also thrown onto the ground by spectators.

The VFL tribunal heard the charges on Tuesday 2 October, and made the following findings:

- Ted Whitfield (South Melbourne) received the most severe penalty. He was suspended until 31 December 1946 for his incident with goal umpire Les Whyte in the final quarter, in which he used abusive language, then attempted to strike Whyte, then ran down the field and lifted his guernsey to try to avoid being reported. Whitfield was the only reported player not to appear at the tribunal to defend himself; and a couple of weeks later he was sacked by South Melbourne. Whitfield was also suspended for two weeks for time-wasting by kicking the ball away after a free kick.
- Jack Williams (South Melbourne) was suspended for twelve weeks: eight weeks for fighting with Rod McLean, and four weeks for using abusive language towards the umpires.
- Don Grossman (South Melbourne) was suspended for eight weeks for striking Jim Mooring.
- Jim Cleary (South Melbourne) was suspended for eight weeks for striking Ken Hands; but was cleared of a further charge of attempting to strike Bob Chitty.
- Bob Chitty (Carlton) was suspended for eight weeks for elbowing Bill Williams.
- Ron Savage (Carlton) was suspended for eight weeks for striking Don Grossman.
- Herbie Matthews (South Melbourne) was severely reprimanded for time-wasting by throwing the ball away after a free kick.

Only Ken Hands (Carlton) and Keith Smith (South Melbourne) were found not guilty of their charges.

A subsequent investigation also saw Carlton's Fred Fitzgibbon brought before the VFL committee. Fitzgibbon had been suspended for four matches for striking Collingwood's Len Hustler in the preliminary final, so was watching the Grand Final from the outer; during the final quarter melee, he jumped the fence, ran to the melee and attempted to strike a South Melbourne player before being escorted from the ground by police. He was suspended for a further four matches.

The game drew condemnation in the media, and headlines around the country for its roughness. The Mirror in Perth noted "widespread disgust has been expressed throughout Australia at the exhibition of alleged football staged by Carlton and South Melbourne in the VFL Grand Final last Saturday". Melbourne tabloid newspaper The Truth called it "the most repugnant spectacle League football has ever known". Perth's the Call newspaper led with the headline "Carlton are Vic. 'footbrawl' premiers". The Recorder in Port Pirie published a local's summary of the game under the byline "they kicked everything except the ball." The match continued to be viewed as a benchmark against which onfield violence was compared for many years.

Many newspapers took a broader view of the game as symptomatic of increasing roughness of the game in Victoria in general during the early 1940s. The Record, the local newspaper circulating in South Melbourne, reported that "to say the match was a 'shameful spectacle' and 'a blot on the game' is sheer hypocrisy, as anyone who has followed League football during the last few years knows that roughness is the rule rather than the exception." The Argus also commented on this and both newspapers placed blame for increased rough play over the previous years on increased frustration and congestion caused by the two major rule changes in 1939: no-drop holding the ball and the reinstatement of the boundary throw-in. Speaking years later, Don Grossman also recalled that bumping had become rougher during the war, owing to a rule allowing bumping only within five yards of the ball. The VFL met in November to discuss its position on a variety of potential national rule changes to reduce congestion – such as re-abolishing the boundary throw-in in favour of a free kick, re-introducing the flick pass, and reducing the number of players on the field – as well as direct measures against violent play – including introducing order-off provisions, and appointing stewards to report players instead of umpires – but ultimately supported none of them.

Despite the game's reputation for violence, all sportswriters praised match umpire Frank Spokes for the control he maintained on the game, and for preventing further escalation of incidents. Spokes spoke to players many times when incidents flared, and waited for players to return to position before restarting play, which was not common practice for umpires at the time. However, the high volume of reports made during this game is also speculated to have been a deliberate directive by the league to the umpiring team, in response to the previous week's preliminary final between Carlton and Collingwood – a match well known to have been at least as rough as the grand final, including a wild final quarter melee with many kicks and punches thrown, but from which only one player was reported. Supporting this, The Record made specific note that Matthews and Whitfield were both reported for time-wasting by throwing or kicking the ball away after a free kick; this had been a technically reportable offence for many years, but was almost never enforced in practice. Matthews himself said he had been doing it for his entire 14-year career without a problem, and was surprised to have been reported.

In the immediate aftermath, both clubs blamed the other for the violence in the game. Reflecting on the game in the Sporting Globe ten years later, South Melbourne full forward Laurie Nash placed the blame on Carlton for starting the violence in the first half with targeted rough play, but blamed South Melbourne for carrying on the violence in search of retribution in the second half, while Carlton went back to playing the ball – probably costing South Melbourne the game. He also happily recalled getting away with punching out Bob Chitty in the final quarter, in retaliation for Chitty's two second-quarter strikes against South Melbourne's youngsters Ron Clegg and Bill Williams, which started the game's melees; and, said that Jim Cleary, who was nicknamed "Gentleman Jim" for his reputation as a fair player, was very unlucky to be suspended for eight weeks for what he thought was an honest attempted spoil on Hands.

== Teams ==
Carlton	South Melbourne

Carlton
B:	Arthur Sanger	Vin Brown	Jim Baird
HB:	Bob Chitty (c)	Bert Deacon	Jim Clark
C:	Doug Williams	Clinton Wines	Herb Turner
HF:	Alec Way	Ken Hands	Lance Collins
F:	Rod McLean	Ken Baxter	Jim Mooring
Foll:	Ron Savage	Jack Bennett	Mick Price
Res:	Charlie McInnes		
Coach:	Percy Bentley		

South Melbourne
B:	Brian Kelly	Jim Cleary	Don Grossman
HB:	Bob Matlock	Jack Williams	Jack Danckert
C:	Ted Whitfield	Herbie Matthews (c)	Billy King
HF:	Vic Castles	Ron Clegg	Keith Smith
F:	Alan Linden	Laurie Nash	Bill Williams
Foll:	Jack Graham	Jack Dempsey	Reg Richards
Res:	Ron Hartridge		
Coach:	Bill Adams		

Both teams made two changes from the sides which secured qualification. South Melbourne brought in Reg Richards (who had missed the semi-final with illness) and Alan Linden, omitting Roy Porter and Max Blumfield. Carlton brought in Charlie McInnes to replace Fred Fitzgibbon, who had been suspended in the preliminary final; and, on the day of the game, brought in Alec Way to replace Ron Hines, who was unable to recover from a thigh injury suffered in the preliminary final. Full forward Ken Baxter, who had played the second half of the season while on leave from the army, was originally rostered back on service, but was able to play when his captain – a Carlton supporter – granted further leave.

== Scoreboard ==
Grand Final
Saturday, 29 September (2:45 pm)	South Melbourne	def. by	Carlton	Princes Park (crowd: 62,986)
0.5 (5); 6.9 (45); 8.10 (58); 10.15 (75)	Q1; Q2; Q3; Final	2.2 (14); 7.5 (47); 12.9 (81); 15.13 (103)	Umpires: Frank Spokes; National anthem: Footscray City Band
Castles 3, Linden 2, Nash 2, Smith 2, Richards	Goals	Hands 3, Price 3, Baxter 2, Mooring 2, Bennett, Chitty, McLean, Savage, Wines
Whitfield, Castles, Smith, Grossman, Richards, Jack Graham, Jack Dempsey, Herbie Matthews	Best	Brown, Sanger, Wines, Baxter, Mick Price, Deacon, Savage, Doug Williams
Kelly (cartilage), Richards (cartilage), Grossman (thigh); Smith (thigh)	Injuries	Collins (ankle), Hands (cut lip and concussion), Chitty (cut above eye)
J. Williams, for using abusive language in the second quarter J. Williams, for misconduct in having adopted a fighting attitude to McLean in the second quarter Whitfield, for misconduct (time-wasting) by kicking away the ball after a free kick in the second quarter Matthews for misconduct (time-wasting) by throwing away the ball after a mark in the second quarter Smith, for striking Mooring in the final quarter Grossman, for striking Mooring in the final quarter Whitfield, for attempting to strike goal umpire Whyte in the final quarter Whitfield, for using abusive language in the final quarter Whitfield, misconduct by running away and concealing his guernsey while being reported in the final quarter Cleary for striking Hands in the final quarter Cleary, for attempting to strike Chitty in the final quarter	Reports	Chitty, for elbowing W. Williams in the second quarter Savage, for striking Grossman in the final quarter Hands, for misconduct by jumping into the back of Clegg in the final quarter

== Notes ==
- Carlton's premiership was the first time that a team who finished the home-and-away season in fourth place won the premiership under the Page–McIntyre system. No team had won from fourth since Fitzroy under the Argus finals system in 1916.
- The 1945 grand final was South Melbourne's last ever grand final while based in Melbourne. It was not until 1996 AFL Grand Final, by which time the club had moved to Sydney and become the Sydney Swans, that it qualified again.

== See also ==
- 1945 VFL season
- 1945 Carlton Football Club season
