= Hanton (surname) =

Hanton is a surname. Notable people with the surname include:

- Alastair Hanton (1926–2021), British banker
- Alex Hanton (1922–2011), Australian rules footballer, twin brother of Hal
- Colin Hanton (born 1938), British musician
- Hal Hanton (1922–2011), Australian rules footballer, twin brother of Alex, both died in the same month
- Karen Hanton (birth date omitted), Scottish entrepreneur

== See also ==
- Hanton City, Rhode Island, apparently named after the local Hanton family
