= Walter Alexander =

Walter Alexander may refer to:

- Walter Alexander Coachbuilders, Scottish bus coachbuilder
- Walter Alexander (Belfast), a subsidiary of the above
- W. Alexander & Sons, Scottish former bus operator
- Walter G. Alexander I (1880–1953), African American physician and politician from New Jersey
- Walt Alexander, American Major League Baseball player
- Walter Alexander, participant in the O. J. Simpson robbery case

== See also ==
- Wal Alexander, Australian rules footballer
