= Tuohill =

Tuohill is a name. Notable people with the name include:

- John Tuohill Murphy (1854–1926), Irish Roman Catholic priest
- Jack Tuohill (1919–1968), Australian rules footballer
- Ted Tuohill (1916–2005), Australian rules footballer
