= Keith Smith (Australian footballer) =

Australian rules footballer

Personal information
- Born: 31 May 1914; South Melbourne, Victoria
- Died: 12 June 1997 (aged 83)
- Original team: Port Melbourne
- Debut: 25 July 1936, South Melbourne vs. Melbourne, at Melbourne Cricket Ground

Playing career^{1}
Years	Club	Games (Goals)
1936–1945	South Melbourne	93 (45)
- ^{1} Playing statistics correct to the end of 1945.

Keith Smith (31 May 1914 – 12 June 1997) was a leading Australian rules footballer of the 1930s and 40s, playing for South Melbourne in the Victorian Football League (VFL).

Born in South Melbourne, Victoria, the 178 cm tall Smith was recruited by South Melbourne from Victorian Football Association (VFA) side Port Melbourne. Described as a pacy and skillful player, Smith made his debut in Round 12 1936, against Melbourne. It was to be his only match that year but returned in 1937 to become a regular member of the South Melbourne side for the rest of the 1930s.

Prior to the 1945 VFL season, Smith had sought to return to Port Melbourne to finish his career but his application for a transfer was refused by South Melbourne. Smith decided to play one more season at South but there were suggestions that Smith was not pleased with the South Melbourne hierarchy. This was brought into the open on 13 July 1945 when the South Melbourne committee suspended Smith and South Melbourne captain Herbie Matthews for disciplinary reasons after they refused to play in the Round 12 match against St Kilda because of the positions they had been selected in. Matthews, who normally played in the centre, had been named on the half forward flank and stated that he would play only if he was named in the centre. When South Melbourne coach Bull Adams dropped Matthews from the side, he asked Smith, who had been named as an emergency, to replace Matthews. Smith refused, stating that he wished to play in the reserves to regain his form. Smith and Matthews were suspended indefinitely but after a meeting with officials, returned to the side after missing only one match.

Smith was selected on a half forward flank for the 1945 VFL Grand Final against Carlton. He kicked South Melbourne's first goal of the game, kicking two for the match in a losing cause, seriously injuring both thighs, and was considered one of South's best. Reported for striking Jim Mooring during the violent last quarter, Smith was found not guilty after Mooring concurred that Smith did not strike him.

Following the end of the 1945 season, Smith was appointed as captain-coach of Dimboola and lead them to the 1946 Wimmera Football League premiership.
