= Jack Dempsey (Australian footballer) =

Australian rules footballer

Personal information
- Full name: John James Francis Dempsey
- Born: 25 September 1919; Richmond, Victoria
- Died: 9 September 2006 (aged 86)
- Height: 183 cm (6 ft 0 in)
- Weight: 88 kg (194 lb)

Playing career^{1}
Years	Club	Games (Goals)
1941, 1944–1947	South Melbourne	45 (12)
- ^{1} Playing statistics correct to the end of 1947.

John James Francis Dempsey (25 September 1919 – 9 September 2006) was an Australian rules footballer who played with South Melbourne in the Victorian Football League (VFL) during the 1940s.

Dempsey made four appearances in the 1941 VFL season but didn't play a single game over the next two years, as he was on active service with the Australian Army. He returned to South Melbourne in 1944 and kicked three goals on his first game back, against St Kilda at Junction Oval. A regular member of the team in 1945, Dempsey missed just one game all year and was South Melbourne's ruck-rover in the 1945 VFL Grand Final.
