= Hartridge =

Hartridge is a surname. Notable people with the surname include:

- Alex Hartridge (born 1999), English footballer
- Algernon Hartridge (1831–1876), American cotton merchant and Confederate veteran
- Emily Hartridge (1984–2019), English YouTuber and television presenter
- Hamilton Hartridge (1886–1976), British eye physiologist and medical writer
- Julian Hartridge (1829–1879), American politician
- Ron Hartridge (1919–1973), Australian rules footballer
- Walter Charlton Hartridge Jr. (1914–1974), American preservationist
