= Guy Moore =

Australian rules footballer

Personal information
- Full name: Guy Frederick Moore
- Born: 30 June 1928; Northcote, Victoria
- Died: 13 September 1973 (aged 45); Heidelberg, Victoria
- Original team: Coburg Juniors
- Height: 180 cm (5 ft 11 in)
- Weight: 76 kg (168 lb)

Playing career^{1}
Years	Club	Games (Goals)
1945–49	Collingwood	36 (42)
1952	Preston (VFA)	1 (1)
- ^{1} Playing statistics correct to the end of 1952.

Guy Frederick Moore (30 June 1928 – 13 September 1973) was an Australian rules footballer who played with Collingwood in the Victorian Football League (VFL).

== Family ==
The son of Charles Frederick Moore (1900–1985), and Lexie Moore (1902–1994), née Mounsey, Guy Frederick Moore was born at Northcote, Victoria 30 June 1928.

He married Lorna Joyce Kavanagh (1924–2016) in 1948.

== Football ==
=== Collingwood (VFL) ===
He played in his first match, at the age of 16, at full-forward (he kicked two goals) for the Collingwood First XVIII, against Richmond, at Victoria Park, on 16 June 1945.

=== Preston (VFA) ===
He was granted a clearance from Collingwood to Preston on 16 April 1952.

== Death ==
He died on 13 September 1973.
