= Jack "Basher" Williams =

Australian rules footballer

Jack Williams

Personal information
- Full name: Jack E. Williams
- Nickname: "Basher"
- Born: 17 June 1917
- Died: 16 May 2000 (aged 82); Coburg, Victoria
- Original team: Maryborough
- Height: 178 cm (5 ft 10 in)
- Weight: 82 kg (181 lb)

Playing career^{1}
Years	Club	Games (Goals)
1939–1946	South Melbourne	61 (3)
- ^{1} Playing statistics correct to the end of 1946.

Jack E. "Basher" Williams (17 June 1917 – 16 May 2000) was an Australian rules footballer who played with South Melbourne in the Victorian Football League (VFL).

When Williams arrived in Melbourne from Maryborough, he had intended to join Footscray, but had to sign with South Melbourne due to residential boundaries.

During his early years at South Melbourne he was rarely available for selection, as he favoured playing with South Melbourne Districts, who could offer him better money. As a result, he played just two VFL games in 1940, one in 1941 and didn't feature at all in the 1941 VFL season.

By 1944 he was a regular fixture in the South Melbourne team, appearing in 15 rounds that year. The previous season he had to sit out eight games through suspension.

Williams then played 21 games in 1945, most notably the "Bloodbath" Grand Final, where the centre half-back was reported three times. He was cited for "adopting a fighting attitude" and on two charges of using obscene language towards the umpires. His suspension totaled 12 weeks but, despite felling Ken Hands and being at the centre of many of the brawls, he was not suspended for any striking charges.

With his suspension ended, Williams played out the 1946 season for South Melbourne, before joining Penshurst as captain-coach in 1947. He fronted the Western District League tribunal in June that year charged with striking a Coleraine player and was suspended for the remainder of the season.
