= Brian Kelly (Australian footballer) =

Australian rules footballer, born 1917

Personal information
- Full name: Brian Joseph Kelly
- Born: 28 July 1917; Elsternwick, Victoria
- Died: 13 May 1985 (aged 67); Cheltenham, Victoria
- Height: 178 cm (5 ft 10 in)
- Weight: 81 kg (179 lb)
- Position: Defender

Playing career^{1}
Years	Club	Games (Goals)
1939–45	South Melbourne	92 (14)
- ^{1} Playing statistics correct to the end of 1945.

Brian Joseph Kelly (28 July 1917 – 13 May 1985) was an Australian rules footballer who played with South Melbourne in the Victorian Football League (VFL).

Kelly, who played at South Melbourne during the Second World War, made his league debut in 1939. He appeared in all of South Melbourne's 18 games in 1941, one of only two players from the club to do so. As a back pocket, Kelly participated in the famous 1945 'Bloodbath' Grand Final.

In 1946, Kelly coached New Town to the TANFL Grand Final, where they lost to Sandy Bay. The following season, he was chosen to coach the South against North in an intrastate match.
