= Vic Castles =

Australian rules footballer

Personal information
- Full name: Victor Tasman Castles
- Born: 4 January 1918; Ulverstone
- Died: 25 May 1993 (aged 75)
- Original team: Wynyard/Port Melbourne
- Height: 173 cm (5 ft 8 in)
- Weight: 70 kg (154 lb)

Playing career^{1}
Years	Club	Games (Goals)
1942–1947	South Melbourne	100 (139)
- ^{1} Playing statistics correct to the end of 1947.

Victor Tasman Castles (4 January 1918 – 25 May 1993) was an Australian rules footballer who played with South Melbourne in the Victorian Football League (VFL) during the 1940s.

Castles, a Tasmanian, spent two seasons with Port Melbourne after arriving on the mainland. In both those years, 1940 and 1941, Port Melbourne were Victorian Football Association (VFA) premiers but Castles was only a member of the 1940 grand final winning team. Although he still turned out in the VFA, Castles was enlisted in the Australian Army in 1941, as a sapper. He was discharged at the end of the year and transferred to VFL club South Melbourne.

Mostly used at half forward and as a rover, Castles was a consistent source of goals for South Melbourne, finishing runner up in their goal-kicking on four occasions. His best effort in a season came in 1945 when he kicked 38 goals and was particularly strong in the finals series. He kicked four goals in South Melbourne's 11 point semi final win over Collingwood, which qualified them for the 1945 VFL Grand Final. In the premiership decider, where no less than six of Castles teammates were reported, he lined up on a half forward flank and kicked a club high three goals, in a losing side.

After appearing in all 17 games in 1946, Castles applied for a clearance to Burnie, but South Melbourne refused. Another season at South Melbourne meant he was able to bring up his 100th league game, in the final round of the year. He was granted a clearance at the end of the season and returned to Tasmania, taking up the position of playing coach for Burnie in the North West Football Union.

He was in charge of Burnie from 1948 to 1950 and his on field performances were rewarded with selection in the Tasmanian team which competed at the 1950 Brisbane Carnival. In 1951 he switched to Wynyard, the club he had played for prior to joining Port Melbourne. His first season at Wynyard was spent as their coach and then in 1952, when he was a member of their premiership team, he contributed just as a player.

Back in Victoria, Castles was appointed coach of Wimmera Football League club Murtoa in 1953. He left them after just one year and joined Jung for the 1954 Horsham & District Football League season.
