= Jim Baird (Australian footballer) =

Australian rules footballer and cricketer

Personal information
- Full name: James George Baird
- Nicknames: Bones, Gentleman Jim
- Born: 9 November 1920; Parkville, Victoria
- Died: 4 November 2003 (aged 82); Sandringham, Victoria
- Original team: Princes Hill
- Debut: Round 1,1941, Carlton vs. Melbourne, at Princes Park, Carlton
- Height: 179 cm (5 ft 10 in)
- Weight: 75 kg (165 lb)

Playing career^{1}
Years	Club	Games (Goals)
1941–1951	Carlton	130 (85)
1956	Sorrento	12 (21)
- ^{1} Playing statistics correct to the end of 1951.

Career highlights
- Carlton football premierships: 1945, 1947; Carlton cricket premierships: 1945/46, 1947/48; Carlton Football Club Hall of Fame; Mentone and St Bedes OCAFC Hall of Fame

James George Baird (9 November 1920 – 4 November 2003) was an Australian rules footballer, cricketer and sprinter from Melbourne, Victoria.

== Football ==
Baird came up playing football with Carlton-based junior team Princes Hill, before being invited to join the Carlton Football Club in the Victorian Football League in 1937. He made his senior debut in Round 1, 1941. At 5'10" height and one of the fastest sprinters in the league, Baird was suited to many positions. He started the 1943 season in strong form at full-forward, and kicked a career high ten goals against eventual premier Richmond in Round 1 of the season.

Three weeks into the 1943 season, he injured his knee; he played two late season games in 1943 with a leather guard on his leg, and much of the 1943/44 cricket season, but the injury continued to trouble him and he missed full 1944 and 1944/45 seasons of both sports before eventually having surgery to remove cartilage from his knee. Despite this, he lost none of his dashing pace, and remained active and successful on the local professional sprinting circuit, which most notably included a third placing in the Stawell Gift in 1946.

Following his return to football from injury in Round 7, 1945, Baird did not return as a full-time forward, instead using his pace and an improvement in groundwork to become an able defender and follower. He was a key part of the team which rebounded from a poor 3–6 start to win the 1945 premiership, and was back pocket in the grand final. He made a return to full forward in the latter part of the 1947 season, kicking a career-high 26 goals for the season, and he kicked three early goals from full forward in the club's one point 1947 grand final victory against Essendon.

Baird became a utility who played on every line of the field: forward-line, half-forward, centre wing, half-back, back-line, and even ruck and follower. He was described as a versatile player and was considered as an all-round athletes in the league.

After leaving Carlton, Baird went to Mentone in the Federal Football League, where he served as senior coach from 1952 until 1955, then as reserves coach from 1956 to 1959. Although he did not win any premierships as coach with the club, the foundation he laid as senior coach was viewed as crucial to the club's 1956 flag and 1958 and 1959 grand final appearances.

Baird was inducted into the Carlton Football Club Hall of Fame in 2006, and into the Hall of Fame of Mentone's successor, the Mentone and St Bedes Old Collegians Amateur Football Club, in 2004.

== Cricket ==
Baird was an accomplished cricketer, playing as a specialist fast-medium bowler with a fast inswinger and effective bouncer. He made his district cricket debut with Carlton in the 1939/40 season, playing alongside older brother Jack for the first six seasons of his career.

He became a dominant force in the 1948/49 season, and was called up for his first class debut in Victoria's second XI's two-match tour of Tasmania. After posting progress season figures of 41 wickets at an average of 9.83 for Carlton, he made his Sheffield Shield debut for Victoria in its last match of the 1948/49 season. He went on to play the entire 1949/50 Shield season for Victoria. He did not gain first-class selection again, and finished his career with ten first-class matches, taking 42 wickets at 24.83 with best figures of 7/108.

Baird continued to play district cricket for Carlton until 1956/57. Over seventeen seasons, he won two premierships with the club and took 374 wickets at an average of 18.06.

== Outside sports ==
Baird earned a living as a master builder. He was married and had two children.

== See also ==
- List of Victoria first-class cricketers
