= Bob Matlock =

Australian rules footballer

Personal information
- Full name: Robert Aubrey Matlock
- Born: 3 August 1918; Port Melbourne, Victoria
- Died: 22 July 2006 (aged 87)
- Original team: West Melbourne
- Height: 175 cm (5 ft 9 in)
- Weight: 76 kg (168 lb)

Playing career^{1}
Years	Club	Games (Goals)
1944–1946	South Melbourne	35 (0)
- ^{1} Playing statistics correct to the end of 1946.

Robert Aubrey Matlock (3 August 1918 – 22 July 2006) was an Australian rules footballer who played with South Melbourne in the Victorian Football League (VFL).

Already 25 years of ago when he made his league debut, Matlock made 11 appearances in 1944. He was a regular member of the team in 1945 and one of just five players who participated in every game. This included the 1945 VFL Grand Final loss to Carlton, which he played as a half back flanker. The following year he twisted his knee in South Melbourne's second round encounter with Essendon and was ruled out for the rest of the season.
