= Max Blumfield =

Australian rules footballer and umpire

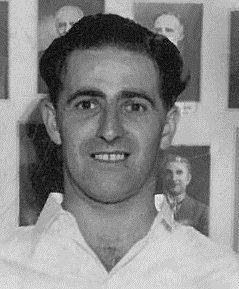

Personal information
- Full name: Maxwell Herbert Blumfield
- Born: 14 August 1922; Pyramid Hill, Victoria
- Died: 20 September 2011 (aged 89); Heidelberg, Victoria
- Original team: Elsternwick Amateurs
- Height: 174 cm (5 ft 9 in)
- Weight: 61 kg (134 lb)
- Position: Rover

Playing career^{1}
Years	Club	Games (Goals)	
1943–46	South Melbourne	21 (11)	

Umpiring career
Years	League	Role	Games
1951–1954	VFL	Field umpire	37
- ^{1} Playing statistics correct to the end of 1946.

Maxwell Herbert Blumfield (14 August 1922 – 20 September 2011) was an Australian rules footballer and umpire who played for South Melbourne in the Victorian Football League (VFL) during the 1940s.

== Playing career ==
Blumfield was recruited from Amateur premiers Elsternwick and he began playing with the South Melbourne reserves in 1941. A rover, he made his VFL debut in round 9, 1943 against Carlton and played all of South's remaining games that season. Blumfield played intermittently over the next three years spending most of the time in the reserves. His only senior final came in the 1945 Second-semi when he was selected to replace regular rover Reg Richards who was suffering from influenza. Despite playing well and kicking one goal, he was named emergency for the following week's 'Bloodbath' grand final when Richards recovered health. Blumfield made three VFL appearances in early 1946 before leaving for Prahran (VFA) where he played in the Reserve Grade premiership team that season.

He was the uncle of former Essendon player Justin Blumfield.

== Umpiring career ==
Blumfield joined the VFL Reserve Grade umpires in 1947 and the following season was one of 29 promoted to the VFL senior list. In 1949 he umpired four Victorian Country Football League (VCFL) finals including the Euroa District League Grand Final. His first VFL Reserve Grade match was in July 1951 and in August he made his debut in the VFL in round 15 at Glenferrie Oval. He finished the season with three VFL matches and the Ovens and Murray Football League Preliminary and Grand Finals.

From 1952 to 1954 Blumfield umpired 31 out of a possible 38 VFL home and away rounds. This included the 1952 Footscray versus St. Kilda match at Yallourn as part of National Day.

On 2 August 1952 Blumfield reported Essendon full-forward John Coleman for abusive language and disputing his decision. In his testimony Blumfield stated, "Coleman said to me 'Go and get a book of rules and read them'. Later Coleman made an insulting remark". Following the guilty verdict and subsequent severe reprimand Blumfield was mobbed and hooted as he left the hearing.

Blumfield's final VFL senior match was in round 10 1954. Later in the season he finished his career with VCFL finals in the Wimmera, Ovens and Murray, Latrobe Valley, Bendigo and Ballarat leagues. In all his career encompassed 37 VFL, 11 VFL Reserve Grade, 90 VCFL and 8 Tasmanian matches in 8 seasons.

Blumfield served the VFL Umpires' Association on the Social Committee from 1951 to 1953 and was a member of the Executive Committee in 1954.

In 1961 he was appointed to the VFL Umpires' Appointment Board, the independent body that appointed and administered umpires for the VFL. Blumfield served as a member of the board from 1961 to 1976. He was chairman in 1965–66 and 1972.

== Death ==
Blumfield died at the Austin Hospital, Melbourne, on 20 September 2011 at 89 years of age.
