= Fred Fitzgibbon =

Australian rules footballer

Personal information
- Full name: Fred Fitzgibbon
- Born: 22 October 1917
- Died: 24 January 1999 (aged 81)
- Original team: Brunswick
- Height: 169 cm (5 ft 7 in)
- Weight: 64 kg (141 lb)
- Position: Wing

Playing career^{1}
Years	Club	Games (Goals)
1942–1948	Carlton	96 (9)
- ^{1} Playing statistics correct to the end of 1948.

Fred Fitzgibbon (22 October 1917 – 24 January 1999) was an Australian rules footballer who played for Carlton in the Victorian Football League (VFL) during the 1940s.

== Career ==
Fitzgibbon spent his early career at Victorian Football Association (VFA) club Brunswick but when the VFA suspended the competition in 1942 due to the war, he decided to switch leagues and joined Carlton.

Used mainly as a wingman, Fitzgibbon became one of Carlton's most physically aggressive players which at times saw him front the tribunal. The most notable suspensions came in the 1945 finals series and began with a four-match suspension for king-hitting Collingwood forward Len Hustler in the Preliminary Final, which meant he had to watch that year's premiership from the stands.

The Grand Final was marred by many instances of violence, and when teammate Jim Mooring was flattened, Fitzgibbon jumped the fence in his street clothes to take part in a bench-clearing brawl, and exchanged punches with South's Ted Whitfield before police ejected him from the ground. Fitzgibbon was suspended for an additional four matches.

He played every game in the 1947 season, including Carlton's one point win over Essendon in the 1947 Grand Final, to ensure the 1945 suspension wouldn't cost him the chance of playing in a premiership.
