= Ricky McLean =

Australian rules footballer

Personal information
- Full name: Roderick McLean
- Born: 8 November 1947 (age 78)
- Original team: Moonee Imperials
- Height: 185 cm (6 ft 1 in)
- Weight: 92 kg (203 lb)

Playing career^{1}
Years	Club	Games (Goals)
1966–1971	Carlton	19 (35)
1972–1976	Richmond	39 (103)
Total		58 (138)
- ^{1} Playing statistics correct to the end of 1976.

Career highlights
- Carlton Reserves Captain 1971; Richmond Equal Leading Goalkicker 1972

Roderick "Ricky" McLean (born 8 November 1947) is a former Australian rules football player who played in the VFL between 1966 and 1971 for the Carlton Football Club and between 1972 and 1974 and again in 1976 for the Richmond Football Club. McLean coached Sunshine in the 1980 VFA season.

== Family ==
He is the son of Carlton footballer Rod McLean.

== Football ==
=== Richmond (VFL) ===
On 14 August 1976, playing for Richmond reserves against South Melbourne on the MCG, McLean was reported on six different charges; he was found guilty of all charges and was suspended for 16 weeks. He did not play VFL football again.
