= Alan Linden =

Australian rules footballer

Personal information
- Full name: Alan Jeffrey Linden
- Born: 27 April 1917
- Died: 5 October 1956 (aged 39); Bendigo, Victoria
- Original team: Sandringham
- Height: 191 cm (6 ft 3 in)
- Weight: 96 kg (212 lb)

Playing career^{1}
Years	Club	Games (Goals)
1941–1947	South Melbourne	80 (56)
- ^{1} Playing statistics correct to the end of 1947.

Alan Jeffrey Linden (27 April 1917 – 5 October 1956) was an Australian rules footballer who played with South Melbourne in the Victorian Football League (VFL).

== Career ==
Linden played as both a forward and follower during his career, which began at Sandringham in 1939. Although he spent seven seasons at South Melbourne, Linden played 58 of his 80 games between 1944 and 1946. He was omitted from the South Melbourne team for the 1945 semi final against Collingwood but returned to the side for the grand final, replacing former Footscray player Roy Porter. A forward pocket in the 1945 VFL Grand Final, Linden contributed two goals but finished on the losing team. After missing very few games in the previous three seasons, he had an injury-plagued year in 1947, which included a twisted ankle, sustained when he tripped over a gutter.

== Death ==
He died in Bendigo on 5 October 1956, from injuries he received in a car accident.
