= Reg Richards =

Australian rules footballer

Personal information
- Full name: Reginald Morris Richards
- Born: 14 December 1917; Blackwood, Victoria
- Died: 7 September 1991 (aged 73)
- Original team: Clifton Hill CYMS (CYMSFA)
- Height: 173 cm (5 ft 8 in)
- Weight: 79 kg (174 lb)

Playing career^{1}
Years	Club	Games (Goals)
1936–1947	South Melbourne	117 (57)
- ^{1} Playing statistics correct to the end of 1947.

Reginald Morris Richards (14 December 1917 – 7 September 1991) was an Australian rules footballer who played with South Melbourne in the Victorian Football League (VFL).

Richards was recruited from CYMS Football Association club Clifton Hill CYMS but came from the country town of Blackwood. He started his career at South Melbourne as an 18-year-old in 1936 but wasn't a regular fixture in the team until 1940.

He was a rover for South Melbourne in the 1945 VFL Grand Final "bloodbath", which they lost to Carlton. After playing all 20 home and away games, he had missed the semi-final with influenza but recovered in time to be selected for the grand final, taking the place of Max Blumfield.

In 1947, his final season, he missed eight games through suspension, following a fight with Fitzroy's Noel Price during their round six encounter. Price, who was also suspended for eight weeks, left Richards with a broken nose. Once his VFL career ended he moved to the country and became playing coach of the Ballarat Football Club as playing coach.

Reynolds also briefly served in the Australian Army during World War II.
