= Frank McGrath (footballer) =

Australian rules footballer, born 1917

Personal information
- Full name: Francis Gerard McGrath
- Born: 22 August 1917; Lake Marmal, Victoria
- Died: 27 May 2008 (aged 90)
- Original team: Boort
- Height: 185 cm (6 ft 1 in)
- Weight: 87 kg (192 lb)

Playing career^{1}
Years	Club	Games (Goals)
1944	Melbourne	2 (1)
1945	Carlton	8 (3)
Total		10 (4)
- ^{1} Playing statistics correct to the end of 1945.

Francis Gerard McGrath (22 August 1917 – 27 May 2008) was an Australian rules footballer who played with Carlton and Melbourne in the Victorian Football League (VFL).

McGrath, who managed eight games for the Blues in their 1945 premiership season, after a two-game stint with Melbourne, was the older brother of JP "Shane" McGrath, the former Melbourne captain and dual premiership full-back.

McGrath also served in both the Australian Army and Royal Australian Air Force during World War II.
