= Hanton City, Rhode Island =

Ghost town in Rhode Island, United States

The remains of a building foundation at Hanton City

Hanton City (known locally as Lost City) is a colonial-era ghost town in Smithfield, Rhode Island near Hanton City Trail. The remains of Hanton City consist of several stone foundations, a burial site, a defunct dam apparently used for irrigation, and a dilapidated scattering of stone walls, typifying it as a standard small New England farming community. The entire site is completely overgrown, making it nearly impossible to locate when any vegetation is present.

== Theories of its existence ==
The remains of a stone wall at Hanton City, with surveyor's tape

At the time of its habitation, the small settlement was extremely isolated from the main town of Smithfield, and several theories have been posited in regards to its existence. One theory is that those who founded Hanton City were Loyalists, colonists who remained loyal to the king of England during the American Revolution. The theory leaves it unclear whether they were forced to live in exile by the Rhode Island Patriots or whether they chose to form an enclave of like-minded people. Several Tories from Newport were exiled to Smithfield and Glocester in 1776, including Thomas Vernon whose diary was published. The most likely theory according to local historian Jim Ignasher is "that Hanton City was first settled by three English families — the Paines, Hantons and Shippees — who possibly were given the land as payment for service in King Philip’s War, which lasted from 1675 to 1676," and the last of the Hanton family members to reside there died around 1900.

The small Alfred Smith Cemetery is located in the area.
