= Doug Williams (Australian footballer) =

Australian rules footballer

Personal information
- Born: 3 February 1923
- Died: 18 August 2014 (aged 91); Inverloch
- Original team: Yallourn
- Height: 175 cm (5 ft 9 in)
- Weight: 71 kg (157 lb)
- Position: Wing

Playing career^{1}
| Years | Club | Games (Goals) |
| 1944–1951 | Carlton | 120 (7) |
- ^{1} Playing statistics correct to the end of 1951.

Career highlights
- 1945 premiership team; 1947 premiership team

Doug Williams (3 February 1923 – 18 August 2014) was an Australian rules footballer who played for Carlton in the Victorian Football League (VFL).

A wingman from Yallourn, Williams played in Carlton's 1945 and 1947 premierships winning teams.

He captain-coached North Launceston in 1952.
