= Kevin Brown (Australian footballer) =

Australian rules footballer

Personal information
- Full name: Kevin Brown
- Born: 3 September 1920
- Died: 10 April 2009 (aged 88)
- Height: 180 cm (5 ft 11 in)
- Weight: 76 kg (168 lb)

Playing career^{1}
Years	Club	Games (Goals)
1945–47	Geelong	25 (0)
- ^{1} Playing statistics correct to the end of 1947.

Kevin Brown (3 September 1920 – 10 April 2009) was an Australian rules footballer who played with Geelong in the Victorian Football League (VFL).
