= Harry Bell (Australian footballer) =

Australian rules footballer

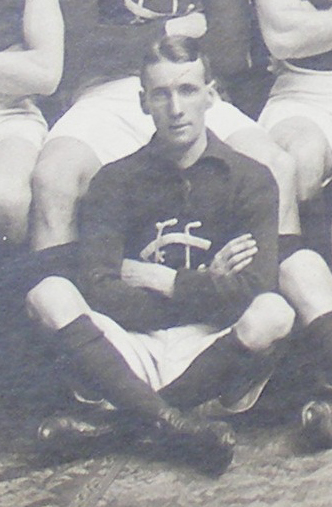
- Bell in 1921

Personal information
- Full name: Harry Oswald Bell
- Born: 25 January 1897; Carlton North, Victoria
- Died: 9 August 1980 (aged 83); Melbourne, Victoria
- Original team: Carlton District
- Height: 170 cm (5 ft 7 in)
- Weight: 60 kg (132 lb)

Playing career^{1}
Years	Club	Games (Goals)
1921–27	Carlton	55 (5)
- ^{1} Playing statistics correct to the end of 1927.

Harry Oswald Bell (25 January 1897 – 9 August 1980) was an Australian rules footballer who played with Carlton in the Victorian Football League (VFL).

Bell's football career began at Preston in the Victorian Junior Football Association and during this time he was also a flyweight division boxer. Bell moved to Carlton in 1920, where he played in the senior side from 1921 until 1927. He also served as secretary from 1940 to 1951.

He named a Life Member of Carlton, and in 1958 co-authored The Carlton Story with the prominent Argus journalist Hugh Buggy.
