= Jim Clapton =

Australian rules footballer

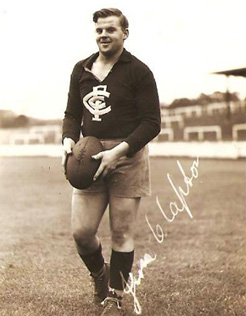
- Clapton in 1945

Personal information
- Full name: Jim Clapton
- Born: 27 February 1927
- Died: 13 May 2011 (aged 84)
- Original team: Northern District Association
- Height: 169 cm (5 ft 7 in)
- Weight: 76 kg (168 lb)

Playing career^{1}
Years	Club	Games (Goals)
1946	Carlton	4 (3)
- ^{1} Playing statistics correct to the end of 1946.

Jim Clapton (27 February 1927 – 13 May 2011) was an Australian rules footballer who played with Carlton in the Victorian Football League (VFL).
