= Ron Boys =

Australian rules footballer

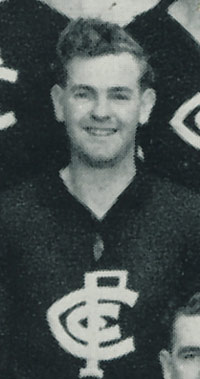
- Andrew in 1934

Personal information
- Full name: Ronald Harold Boys
- Born: 10 September 1924
- Died: 20 October 1990 (aged 66)
- Original team: Northcote
- Height: 188 cm (6 ft 2 in)
- Weight: 82.5 kg (182 lb)

Playing career^{1}
Years	Club	Games (Goals)
1943–47	Carlton	14 (3)
1948–49	Hawthorn	26 (2)
Total		40 (5)
- ^{1} Playing statistics correct to the end of 1949.

Ronald Harold Boys (10 September 1924 – 20 October 1990) was an Australian rules footballer who played with Carlton and Hawthorn in the Victorian Football League (VFL).
