= Dan Beauvais =

Australian rules footballer

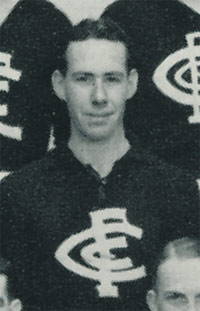
- Beauvais in 1945

Personal information
- Full name: Daniel Leonard Beauvais
- Born: 20 October 1920; Brunswick, Victoria
- Died: 11 June 1998 (aged 77); Malbina, Tasmania
- Original team: Jeparit
- Height: 180 cm (5 ft 11 in)
- Weight: 76 kg (168 lb)

Playing career^{1}
Years	Club	Games (Goals)
1945	Carlton	4 (5)
1946	Hawthorn	7 (1)
Total		11 (6)
- ^{1} Playing statistics correct to the end of 1946.

Daniel Leonard Beauvais (20 October 1920 – 11 June 1998) was an Australian rules footballer who played with Carlton and Hawthorn in the Victorian Football League (VFL).
