= Ron Hines (footballer) =

Australian rules footballer (1923–2019)

Personal information
- Full name: Ronald Victor Hines
- Nickname: Ripper
- Born: 11 July 1923; Ballarat, Victoria
- Died: 6 January 2019 (aged 95)
- Original team: Coburg District
- Height: 165 cm (5 ft 5 in)
- Weight: 65.5 kg (144 lb)
- Position: Wingman

Playing career^{1}
Years	Club	Games (Goals)
1943–48	Carlton	58 (21)
- ^{1} Playing statistics correct to the end of 1948.

Ronald Victor Hines (11 July 1923 – 6 January 2019) was an Australian rules footballer who played with Carlton in the Victorian Football League (VFL).
