= Ernie Spence =

Australian rules footballer

Personal information
- Full name: Jacob Ernest Spence
- Born: 21 September 1918; Footscray, Victoria
- Died: 29 March 2007 (aged 88)
- Original team: Yarraville
- Height: 166 cm (5 ft 5 in)
- Weight: 72 kg (159 lb)

Playing career^{1}
Years	Club	Games (Goals)
1944	Carlton	4 (0)
- ^{1} Playing statistics correct to the end of 1944.

Jacob Ernest "Spanner" Spence (21 September 1918 – 29 March 2007) was an Australian rules footballer who played with Carlton in the Victorian Football League (VFL).
