= Fred Rose (footballer) =

Australian rules footballer, born 1919

Personal information
- Full name: Frederick William Rose
- Born: 26 December 1919; Ultima, Victoria
- Died: 27 March 1988 (aged 68); Mathoura, New South Wales
- Original team: Sea Lake

Playing career^{1}
Years	Club	Games (Goals)
1945	Carlton	2 (3)
- ^{1} Playing statistics correct to the end of 1945.

Frederick William Rose (26 December 1919 – 27 March 1988) was an Australian rules footballer who played with Carlton in the Victorian Football League (VFL).

== Career ==
After initially serving in the Army Reserve, Fred Rose enlisted in the Australian Army in April 1943 and served until late 1945, including a for four-month stint in the Solomon Islands.

While serving in the Army, Rose played for Carlton in the first two rounds of the 1945 VFL season, remaining with the club through 1946 but never again playing for the senior team.

== Personal life ==
In October 1946, Frederick Rose married Nancye Marie McGeachin (1924–1998) and they subsequently lived on farms near Sea Lake, Wangaratta and Moama.
