= Adrian Hearn =

Australian rules footballer

Personal information
- Full name: Adrian Hearn
- Born: 16 March 1920
- Died: 18 October 1993 (aged 73)
- Original team: North Melbourne CBC
- Height: 185 cm (6 ft 1 in)
- Weight: 78 kg (172 lb)

Playing career^{1}
Years	Club	Games (Goals)
1943	Fitzroy	3 (1)
1945	Carlton	3 (5)
Total		6 (6)
- ^{1} Playing statistics correct to the end of 1945.

Adrian Hearn (16 March 1920 – 18 October 1993) is a former Australian rules footballer who played for the Carlton Football Club and Fitzroy Football Club in the Victorian Football League (VFL).
