= Len Harris (footballer) =

Australian rules footballer (1924–1995)

Personal information
- Full name: Len Harris
- Born: 25 August 1924
- Died: 19 March 1995 (aged 70)
- Original team: Carlton District
- Height: 177 cm (5 ft 10 in)
- Weight: 70 kg (154 lb)

Playing career^{1}
Years	Club	Games (Goals)
1946	Carlton	1 (0)
- ^{1} Playing statistics correct to the end of 1946.

Len Harris (25 August 1924 – 19 March 1995) was an Australian rules footballer who played with Carlton in the Victorian Football League (VFL).
