= Les McCann (footballer) =

Australian rules footballer

Personal information
- Full name: Leslie John McCann
- Born: 29 August 1920; Moama, New South Wales
- Died: 13 February 1994 (aged 73); Echuca, Victoria
- Original team: RAAF
- Height: 173 cm (5 ft 8 in)
- Weight: 73 kg (161 lb)

Playing career^{1}
Years	Club	Games (Goals)
1944	Carlton	7 (1)
- ^{1} Playing statistics correct to the end of 1944.

Leslie John McCann (29 August 1920 – 13 February 1994) was an Australian rules footballer who played with Carlton in the Victorian Football League (VFL).
