= Alex Hanton =

Australian rules footballer

Personal information
- Full name: Alexander George Hanton
- Born: 25 May 1922; Frankston, Victoria
- Died: 5 September 2011 (aged 89)
- Original team: Frankston
- Height: 183 cm (6 ft 0 in)
- Weight: 79 kg (174 lb)

Playing career^{1}
Years	Club	Games (Goals)
1946	Carlton	1 (1)
- ^{1} Playing statistics correct to the end of 1946.

Alexander George Hanton (25 May 1922 – 5 September 2011) was an Australian rules footballer who played for the Carlton Football Club in the Victorian Football League (VFL).

== Family ==
The son of William Mark Hanton (1878-1956), and Ellen Clement Hanton (1883-1962), née Annand, Alexander George Hanton was born at Frankston, Victoria on 25 May 1922.

Alex's twin brother, Harold Roy "Hal" Hanton (1922-2011), who also played for Carlton in the VFL, died just 9 days after Alex's death.

He married Valma Lillian Rinder (1936-1983).
