= Jim Cleary (Australian footballer) =

Australian rules footballer

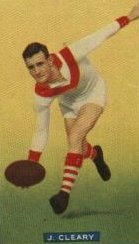

Personal information
- Full name: James Leslie William Cleary
- Nickname: Gentleman Jim
- Born: 13 July 1914; Carlton, Victoria
- Died: 2 May 1993 (aged 78)
- Original team: Thornbury CYMS (CYMSFA)
- Height: 183 cm (6 ft 0 in)
- Weight: 89 kg (196 lb)

Playing career^{1}
Years	Club	Games (Goals)
1934–1948	South Melbourne	222 (6)
- ^{1} Playing statistics correct to the end of 1948.

Jim Cleary (13 July 1914 – 2 May 1993) was an Australian rules footballer who played for South Melbourne in the Victorian Football League (VFL).

Cleary played as a fullback and won two best and fairest awards for South Melbourne, in 1942 and 1944. He was a highly regarded player, and attracted lucrative offers – an undisclosed amount from Brighton in 1940, and £400 from Camberwell in 1945 – to cross to the Victorian Football Association during the throw-pass era, but chose to remain with South Melbourne.

Cleary's reputation as a fair player earned him the nickname "Gentleman Jim"; this did not stop him from being suspended for eight matches for a striking offence in the notoriously violent 1945 VFL Grand Final – in an incident team-mate Laurie Nash later described as "one of the few honest accidents in the game".

He left the club in 1949 and went on to become captain and coach of Victorian Football Association club Port Melbourne; he coached there from 1949 until 1952, leading the club to consecutive minor premierships and Grand Final losses in 1951 and 1952; he then coached at fellow VFA clubs Brunswick (from 1953 until 1958) and Dandenong (from 1959 until 1961), coaching a total of 267 VFA games. He remained involved in the game even after retiring as a coach, becoming a regular panelist on World of Sport.
