= Les Gregory (footballer, born 1915) =

Australian rules footballer, born 1915

Personal information
- Full name: Leslie George Gregory
- Born: 13 June 1915; Howlong, New South Wales
- Died: 29 May 1999 (aged 83)
- Original teams: Howlong, Albury
- Height: 180 cm (5 ft 11 in)
- Weight: 79.5 kg (175 lb)

Playing career^{1}
| Years | Club | Games (Goals) |
| 1944–45 | Carlton | 2 (0) |
- ^{1} Playing statistics correct to the end of 1945.

Leslie George Gregory (13 June 1915 – 29 May 1999) was an Australian rules footballer who played with Carlton in the Victorian Football League (VFL).

Prior to World War Two in 1937, Gregory was approached a Melbourne based VFL club.

He was a member of the Air Force, and played for many different clubs as he was posted to different areas before playing with Carlton in the VFL. Reaching the rank of Warrant Officer, he was discharged in October 1945.
