= Arthur Hall (footballer) =

Australian rules footballer

Personal information
- Full name: Thomas Arthur Hall
- Born: 20 April 1918; Mansfield, Victoria
- Died: 31 January 2002 (aged 83)
- Original teams: Benalla, Benalla All Blacks
- Height: 180 cm (5 ft 11 in)
- Weight: 81 kg (179 lb)
- Position: Defense

Playing career^{1}
Years	Club	Games (Goals)
1936–1941	Fitzroy	68 (4)
1945	Carlton	3 (1)
Total		71 (5)
- ^{1} Playing statistics correct to the end of 1945.

Thomas Arthur Hall (20 April 1918 – 31 January 2002) was an Australian rules footballer who played for the Carlton Football Club and Fitzroy Football Club in the Victorian Football League (VFL).

Hall was runner up in the 1934 Tatong Thoona Football Association best and fairest award.
