= Mick Price (footballer) =

Australian rules footballer

Personal information
- Full name: Albert Leslie Price
- Born: 30 April 1914; Carlton, Victoria
- Died: 19 November 1973 (aged 59); Moorabbin, Victoria
- Original team: Carlton Juniors
- Height: 174 cm (5 ft 9 in)
- Weight: 70 kg (154 lb)

Playing career^{1}
Years	Club	Games (Goals)
1936–1946	Carlton	102 (163)
- ^{1} Playing statistics correct to the end of 1946.

Albert Leslie "Mick" Price (30 April 1914 – 19 November 1973) was an Australian rules footballer who played with Carlton in the Victorian Football League (VFL).

Price playing as both a forward and rover during his career and won the 1940 Gardiner Medal for best player in the reserves. He was a premiership player in 1938 and 1945, the latter the infamous Bloodbath Grand Final where Price contributed three goals.
