= Ted Whitfield =

Australian rules footballer

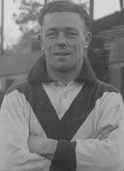

Personal information
- Full name: Edward Carlyle Whitfield
- Born: 13 June 1916
- Died: 7 September 1993 (aged 77)
- Original team: Coburg (VFA)
- Debut: Round 12, 1939, South Melbourne vs. Carlton, at Lake Oval

Playing career^{1}
Years	Club	Games (Goals)
1939–1945	South Melbourne	54 (11)
- ^{1} Playing statistics correct to the end of 1945.

Edward Carlyle Whitfield (13 June 1916 – 7 September 1993) was an Australian rules footballer, playing with South Melbourne Football Club in the Victorian Football League (VFL).

Born in North Melbourne, Whitfield was recruited by South Melbourne from Victorian Football Association (VFA) side Coburg Football Club and made his VFL debut in Round 12, 1939 against Carlton at Lake Oval, South Melbourne's home ground.

A wingman, Whitfield was considered a live wire, both on the ground and off, who appeared "to march to a different drum." Part of his match preparation was to drink six beers every Saturday morning before a game, followed by another at half-time, a habit he had been following since he was sixteen and as it had served him well thus far, Whitfield was in no mood to change it.

Whitfield was also in the habit of wearing his football gear under his street clothes to the ground to save time getting changed before the game, although one time when he was particularly late he explained to the coach he had been entertaining a lady friend and had let time slip away. He was forced to change in the back of a taxi on the way to the ground but claimed that the lady friend was able to greatly assist him as she had plenty of experience removing his clothes in the back seat of a car.

Whitfield enlisted in the Australian Army on 28 August 1941, gaining the rank of Gunner and serving with 115 Australian General Hospital until his discharge from the services on 19 June 1942. This led to his absence from VFL football for the best part of three seasons, until his return to South Melbourne in 1944.

Never one to shy away from a fight, Whitfield was reported a number of times throughout his career, including in three separate matches in 1945. However, Whitfield was one of South Melbourne's leading players in 1945 and was a key reason for South Melbourne's dominance of the competition throughout the season.

In the 1945 VFL Grand Final, a spiteful match known as The Bloodbath, Whitfield was reported for attempting to strike field umpire Frank Spokes, using abusive language and for kicking the ball away after a free kick was given against him. When the umpire attempted to report Whitfield, he pulled his jumper over his head and ran down the other end of the field to stop the umpire taking his number, later claiming he thought he had heard the final siren and was running off to swap guernseys with his opponent.

Whitfield, who declined to attend the tribunal hearing because he had already bought a ticket to a Cabaret Ball held the same night, was suspended for twelve months plus two games and then informed by South Melbourne that not only was he no longer required as a player, but he was barred from the Lake Oval as a spectator; Whitfield was eventually welcomed back to South Melbourne, becoming a member of the Past Players' Association in the 1960s.

With his VFL career finished after 54 games and 11 goals, Whitfield played and coached in country Victoria, including a stint with Wimmera Football League club Ararat from 1949 to 1951, playing 54 games, winning the club Best and Fairest in 1949 and being the competition Leading Goalkicker in 1951. He was later named in Ararat's "Team of the Century". Whitfield then captain-coached Yarram in the Alberton Football League, leading Yarram to a premiership in 1954. Whitfield's playing days were ended in 1958 when he ruptured a spleen.
