= Roy Porter (footballer) =

Australian rules footballer

Personal information
- Full name: Leslie Roy Porter
- Born: 24 August 1917; Footscray, Victoria
- Died: 6 February 1998 (aged 80)
- Original team: West Footscray
- Height: 185 cm (6 ft 1 in)
- Weight: 86 kg (190 lb)

Playing career^{1}
Years	Club	Games (Goals)
1937–1940	Footscray	28 (23)
1941, 1945	South Melbourne	5 (1)
Total		33 (24)
- ^{1} Playing statistics correct to the end of 1945.

Leslie Roy Porter (24 August 1917 – 6 February 1998) was an Australian rules footballer who played with Footscray and South Melbourne in the Victorian Football League (VFL).

== Family ==
The son of Robert Clyde Porter (1891–1963) and May Elizabeth Porter, nee Johnson (1892–1976), Leslie Roy Porter was born at Footscray in August 1917.

Porter married Nancy Nerrida Mallows in 1941.

== War service ==
Porter served in both the Australian Army and the Royal Australian Air Force during World War II.
