= Les Marden =

Australian rules footballer

Personal information
- Full name: Leslie Keith Marden
- Born: 23 September 1919; Brighton, Victoria
- Died: 20 January 2002 (aged 82)
- Original teams: Navy and Ormond
- Height: 170 cm (5 ft 7 in)
- Weight: 64 kg (141 lb)

Playing career^{1}
Years	Club	Games (Goals)
1944	Carlton	2 (0)
1945–47	Coburg (VFA)	36 (23)
- ^{1} Playing statistics correct to the end of 1944.

Leslie Keith Marden (23 September 1919 – 20 January 2002) was an Australian rules footballer who played with Carlton in the Victorian Football League (VFL).
