= Ron Savage =

Australian rules footballer (born 1917)

Personal information
- Full name: Ronald Ellis Savage
- Born: 22 April 1917; Carlton, Victoria
- Died: 15 January 1974 (aged 56); Mooroopna, Victoria
- Original team: Vermont
- Debut: Round 14, 1938, Carlton vs. Essendon, at Princes Park
- Height: 187 cm (6 ft 2 in)
- Weight: 89 kg (196 lb)

Playing career^{1}
Years	Club	Games (Goals)
1938–1945	Carlton	111 (95)
- ^{1} Playing statistics correct to the end of 1945.

Ronald Ellis Savage (22 April 1917 – 15 January 1974) was an Australian rules footballer who played for Carlton in the Victorian Football League (VFL).

== Football ==
A flexible utility player, Savage played all over the ground throughout his career, most frequently in the ruck, back line and forward line. He was tall and instantly recognisable from his blond hair, from which he derived his nickname "the Blond Bomber". From Melbourne's eastern suburbs, Savage began his junior career at Tunstall in the Mitcham district league. He first played seconds football for the Carlton Football Club as a 17-year-old in 1934, and made his senior debut in 1938. By 1939, Savage was Carlton's best follower and among the top players in the league. Savage had his best season in 1945, winning the best and fairest award in the club's premiership season and earning Victorian interstate selection; in the notoriously violent 1945 VFL grand final against South Melbourne, known as "the Bloodbath", he was suspended for eight matches for striking Don Grossman.

Savage left Carlton for Tasmania at the end of 1945. Savage signed as playing coach of the Hobart Football Club in the Tasmanian Australian National Football League for 1946 and 1947, but Carlton refused his clearance on residential grounds, forcing him to sit out the 1946 season as Hobart's non-playing coach. He was not cleared to play for Hobart until 1947, after appealing his transfer to the Australian National Football Council. In the acrimony, Savage requested his life membership at Carlton be rescinded; made public claims that he had been offered an illegal payment connected to Carlton in an attempt to retain him; and later attempted to claim £100 from Carlton's provident fund, which Carlton had withheld on the grounds that it was the council and not the club which had cleared him.

Savage sought to move to City in the Northern Tasmanian Football Association in 1948, but his clearance was rejected by Hobart and he instead spent the season with Franklin in the Huon Football Association in 1948. He joined City as playing coach in 1949, remaining as player only in 1950. He was then captain-coach of the NTFA's Longford in 1951 and 1952.

Savage then returned to Victoria to captain-coach the Red Cliffs Football Club in the Sunraysia Football League, where they won the 1953 premiership.

== War service ==
In the middle of his time at Carlton, Savage enlisted to serve in the Australian Army during World War II.

== Family ==
The son of unmarried mother Violet Irene Ellis (1891–1919), Ronald Ellis was born at Carlton on 22 April 1917. Shortly after his birth he was adopted by Joseph William Savage (1874–1952) and Annie Savage, nee Harrison, and took the name Ronald Ellis Savage.

== Death ==
Ronald Ellis Savage died at Mooroopna on 15 January 1974 and was cremated at Fawkner Memorial Park.
