= Allan Greenshields =

Australian rules footballer

- Greenshields during his Carlton career

Personal information
- Full name: Allan John Greenshields
- Born: 22 January 1926; Rainbow, Victoria
- Died: 28 June 2016 (aged 90)
- Original team: Pascoe Vale
- Height: 178 cm (5 ft 10 in)
- Weight: 74 kg (163 lb)

Playing career^{1}
Years	Club	Games (Goals)
1947–49	Carlton	16 (2)
1949–54	St Kilda	57 (3)
Total		73 (5)
- ^{1} Playing statistics correct to the end of 1954.

Allan John Greenshields (22 January 1926 – 28 June 2016) was an Australian rules footballer who played for Carlton and St Kilda in the VFL.

Although recruited from Pascoe Vale, Greenshields had also played football in Coburg prior to arriving at Carlton. He was a reserve in Carlton's 1947 premiership team but did not take the field during the game, and was a reserve in all but three of his games while with Carlton. Greenshields played more when he crossed to St Kilda, being used mainly as a half back flanker.
