= Bernie Bignell =

Australian rules footballer, born 1917

Personal information
- Full name: Charles Bernard Alfred Bignell
- Born: 12 May 1917; Birmingham, Warwickshire, England
- Died: 19 June 1967 (aged 50); Kew, Victoria, Australia
- Original teams: Mantons & Northcote High School
- Height: 174 cm (5 ft 9 in)
- Weight: 79 kg (174 lb)

Playing career^{1}
Years	Club	Games (Goals)
1940, 1945	Carlton	6 (0)
- ^{1} Playing statistics correct to the end of 1945.

Charles Bernard Alfred Bignell (12 May 1917 – 19 June 1967) was an Australian rules footballer who played for the Carlton Football Club in the Victorian Football League (VFL).

== Family ==
He married Gwendoline Phyllis Allan in 1942.

== Military service ==
He enlisted in the Second AIF in August 1940.

== Death ==
He died at his home in Kew, Victoria on 19 June 1967.
