= Arthur Sanger =

Australian rules footballer, born 1918

Personal information
- Full name: Arthur Mervyn Sanger
- Born: 26 March 1918; Daylesford, Victoria
- Died: 3 December 1999 (aged 81)
- Original teams: Daylesford, Castlemaine
- Height: 177 cm (5 ft 10 in)
- Weight: 81 kg (179 lb)
- Position: Back pocket

Playing career^{1}
Years	Club	Games (Goals)
1938–47	Carlton	117 (1)
- ^{1} Playing statistics correct to the end of 1947.

Arthur Mervyn Sanger (26 March 1918 – 3 December 1999) was an Australian rules footballer who played with Carlton in the Victorian Football League (VFL).

From Daylesford, Sanger was a back pocket specialist, who kicked the only goal of his league career when he came on as 19th man for a match against Footscray in his second season. Carlton were VFL premiers in Sanger's first and last seasons, but he wasn't selected for either side. He was however a member of their 1945 premiership team, playing from the back pocket in the famed 'Bloodbath' Grand Final. His career ended when he suffered a badly broken arm in 1947.

Sanger was appointed coach of the Carlton Under 19 team in 1951 and guided them to a Premiership in his first year.
