= Ron Hartridge =

Australian rules footballer

Personal information
- Full name: Ronald Osmond Hartridge
- Born: 8 November 1919
- Died: 28 May 1973 (aged 53)
- Original team: South Melbourne Tech Col
- Height: 179 cm (5 ft 10 in)
- Weight: 80 kg (176 lb)

Playing career^{1}
Years	Club	Games (Goals)
1938–1940	St Kilda	15 (11)
1943–1946	South Melbourne	50 (71)
Total		65 (82)
- ^{1} Playing statistics correct to the end of 1946.

Ronald Osmond Hartridge (8 November 1919 – 28 May 1973) was an Australian rules footballer who played with St Kilda and South Melbourne in the Victorian Football League (VFL).

Hartridge had a slow start to his career, after arriving at St Kilda from South Melbourne Technical College. A key position player, he could only put together 11 appearances in his first three seasons and then didn't play any VFL football in 1941 and 1942.

He had his first seasons with South Melbourne in 1943 and the following year was finally able to make regular appearances, playing 17 games. In 1944 he also kicked 31 goals to top South Melbourne's goal-kicking. He didn't miss a single game in 1945 and was again successful up forward with 32 goals, but would only play as a reserve in the 1945 VFL Grand Final. In 1947 he made two appearances early in the season but would finish the year at Coburg in the Victorian Football Association.
