= Bill Adams (Australian footballer) =

Australian footballer (1900–1973)

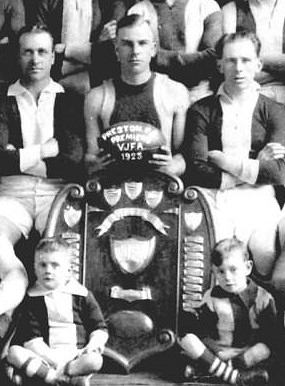

Personal information
- Full name: William John Adams
- Born: 11 December 1900; Fremantle, Western Australia
- Died: 11 August 1973 (aged 72); Heidelberg, Victoria
- Original team: South Fremantle / Preston
- Height: 180 cm (5 ft 11 in)
- Weight: 86 kg (190 lb)

Playing career^{1}
Years	Club	Games (Goals)
1921–1922	South Fremantle	32
1924–1926	Fitzroy	51 (17)
1931–1932	Melbourne	16 (12)
Total		67 (29)

Coaching career
Years	Club	Games (W–L–D)
1945–1948	South Melbourne	70 (39–30–1)
- ^{1} Playing statistics correct to the end of 1948.

William John Adams (11 December 1900 – 11 August 1973) was an Australian rules footballer who played for Fitzroy and Melbourne in the Victorian Football League (VFL) before becoming coach of South Melbourne. He also went by his nickname of "Bull" during his career.

== Football ==
Adams was originally from South Fremantle where he played 32 games from his debut in 1921. In his first season, he was included in the Western Australian squad for the Perth Carnival, but did not manage a game.

Adams came to Melbourne in 1923 to play with Fitzroy, but was refused a clearance by South Fremantle and instead became captain-coach of Preston in the Victorian Junior Football Association (pictured right with John Wren Shield as premiers).

Adams was cleared the following year and played in the Fitzroy side which contested the finals that season. He was club captain for their 1926 campaign and as well as finishing equal fifth in the Brownlow Medal count he represented Victoria at interstate football that year. A tough and physical player, Adams spent most of his time in defence but was also used on the ball.

In 1927 he left Fitzroy and joined Northcote in the Victorian Football Association (VFA) where he faced a unique challenge. That year, Doug Nicholls became one of the first Aboriginal people to play senior football in Melbourne and according to Mavis Thorp Clark in her 1965 book on Nicholls, Pastor Doug, Adams warned the players before taking the ground that although "they had colour in the side, they were to kick to the guernsey and disregard the colour".

Adams trained with Richmond in 1928 but failed to come to terms with the club and he returned to Preston for two seasons. He had his best year with them in 1929 when he won both their best and fairest award and kicked 69 goals to top their goal kicking.

Adams then moved to Tasmania for the 1930 season, being playing coach of North Launceston in the Northern Tasmanian Football Association (NTFA) competition.

After spending the first half of the 1931 football season as playing coach of Prahran, Adams returned to the VFL and signed up with Melbourne where he would play until his retirement as a player at the end of the 1932 season. He continued his coaching career with Melbourne, coaching their reserves to five premierships between 1933 and 1939.

His coaching career peaked in 1945 when he was appointed coach of South Melbourne and steered them to the 1945 VFL Grand Final. South Melbourne lost the game and despite remaining with them for another three years he was unable to qualify the club for another finals series. He coaching at South Melbourne was terminated halfway through the 1948 season after he openly criticized the team in a radio interview. Adams had said " The players lack fierceness and some of the players were being like bottled fed babies". He was replaced by Jack Hale.

From various reports during his years at Preston, Adams was just as colourful character off the football field as on, having played senior cricket in Perth and won state swimming championships. Off the field, he was no mean pianist, entertaining at many club socials, and was described as a "dab hand" at chess. He also had a fondness for poetry, and more than once quoted lines from the classics in his addresses to players. According to the Northcote Leader in 1927 when he was coaching the local club, Adam's favourite lines were from the English poet, Sir Henry Newbolt's Vitaï Lampada:

"and the captain's hand on his shoulder smote,
play up, play up and play the game."
