= Clinton Wines =

Australian rules footballer

Personal information
- Full name: Clinton Bligh Wines
- Born: 2 May 1922
- Died: 23 October 2006 (aged 84)
- Original team: South Warrnambool (HFL)
- Height: 179 cm (5 ft 10 in)
- Weight: 80 kg (176 lb)
- Position: Centreman/Forward

Playing career^{1}
Years	Club	Games (Goals)
1945–1946	Carlton	39 (10)
- ^{1} Playing statistics correct to the end of 1946.

Clinton Wines (2 May 1922 – 23 October 2006) was an Australian rules footballer who played with Carlton in the Victorian Football League (VFL) during the mid-1940s.

While at Carlton, Wines played as a centreman and it was in that position that he starred against Herbie Matthews in the 1945 VFL Grand Final win over South Melbourne. Wines, who was originally from Hampden Football League club South Warrnambool, had served with the 2/23rd Battalion in North Africa before joining Carlton.

The next stage of his career was spent in Sydney, where he had gone because his wife was home sick. He was signed up by Eastern Suburbs where he would play often as a forward, topping their goal-kicking twice, including an 81-goal season in 1949. On one occasion, in 1950, he kicked 19 goals in a match against Illawarra. Wines also captain-coached Eastern Suburbs for a time and captained New South Wales at interstate football.

Wines moved to Ganmain as a school teacher and coach them in 1952, 1953 and 1955, leading them to the 1953 South West Football League premiership and kicking over 100 goals in 1953 too.

He then coached fellow South West Football League club Grong Grong Matong from 1956 to 1958, playing over 100 games with them.
