= Ken McLean =

Australian rules footballer (1922–1992)

Personal information
- Full name: Kenneth Henry McLean
- Born: 21 December 1922; Coburg, Victoria
- Died: 14 November 1992 (aged 69)
- Original team: Coburg Sons of Soldiers
- Height: 177 cm (5 ft 10 in)
- Weight: 79 kg (174 lb)

Playing career^{1}
Years	Club	Games (Goals)
1943–44, 1946	Carlton	10 (5)
- ^{1} Playing statistics correct to the end of 1946.

Kenneth Henry McLean (21 December 1922 – 14 November 1992) was an Australian rules footballer who played with Carlton in the Victorian Football League (VFL).

McLean served in the Australian Army during World War II, his overseas service in New Guinea in 1945 preventing him from playing that season.
