= Ken Hopper =

Australian rules footballer

Personal information
- Full name: Kenneth Leslie Hopper
- Born: 8 June 1924; Northcote, Victoria
- Died: 29 June 2017 (aged 93)
- Original team: Pascoe Vale
- Height: 183 cm (6 ft 0 in)
- Weight: 76 kg (168 lb)
- Position: Utility

Playing career^{1}
Years	Club	Games (Goals)
1945–1946	Carlton	17 (8)
1947–1951	Hawthorn	66 (9)
Total		83 (17)
- ^{1} Playing statistics correct to the end of 1951.

Kenneth Leslie Hopper (8 June 1924 – 29 June 2017) was an Australian rules footballer who played with Carlton and Hawthorn in the Victorian Football League (VFL).

== Honours and achievements ==
- Hawthorn life member
