= Jim Jones (footballer) =

Australian rules footballer

Personal information
- Full name: James Henry Charles Jones
- Born: 16 April 1918; Bendigo, Victoria
- Died: 20 April 2002 (aged 84); Swan Hill, Victoria
- Original team: Ouyen
- Height: 178 cm (5 ft 10 in)
- Weight: 80 kg (176 lb)

Playing career^{1}
Years	Club	Games (Goals)
1939–40, 1945–46	Carlton	15 (1)
- ^{1} Playing statistics correct to the end of 1946.

James Henry Charles Jones (16 April 1918 – 20 April 2002) was an Australian rules footballer who played with Carlton in the Victorian Football League (VFL).
