= Jack Way =

Australian rules footballer, born 1902

Personal information
- Full name: John Francis Way
- Born: 17 August 1902; Werribee, Victoria
- Died: 19 June 1970 (aged 67); Essendon, Victoria
- Original teams: Brunswick Juniors & Carlton District
- Height: 178 cm (5 ft 10 in)
- Weight: 76 kg (168 lb)

Playing career^{1}
Years	Club	Games (Goals)
1925, 1927	Carlton	4 (1)
1928	Essendon	5 (2)
Total		9 (3)
- ^{1} Playing statistics correct to the end of 1928.

John Francis Way (17 August 1902 – 19 June 1970) was an Australian rules footballer who played with Carlton and Essendon in the Victorian Football League (VFL).
