= Cyril Mann (footballer) =

Australian rules footballer

Personal information
- Full name: Cyril Stanley Mann
- Born: 31 August 1918; Carlton, Victoria
- Died: 3 March 1964 (aged 45); Preston, Victoria
- Original team: Sylvan
- Height: 175 cm (5 ft 9 in)
- Weight: 83 kg (183 lb)

Playing career^{1}
Years	Club	Games (Goals)
1939–1942, 1945	Carlton	42 (65)
- ^{1} Playing statistics correct to the end of 1945.

Cyril Stanley Mann (31 August 1918 – 3 March 1964) was an Australian rules footballer who played with Carlton in the Victorian Football League (VFL). He was a full forward and noted for his high marking.
