= Ken Hands =

Australian rules footballer and coach

Personal information
- Born: 26 October 1926
- Died: 22 December 2017 (aged 91)
- Original team: North Geelong
- Debut: Round 5, 1945, Carlton vs. St Kilda, at Princes Park
- Height: 185 cm (6 ft 1 in)
- Weight: 85 kg (187 lb)

Playing career^{1}
Years	Club	Games (Goals)
1945–1957	Carlton	211 (188)

Coaching career
Years	Club	Games (W–L–D)
1959–1964	Carlton	114 (60–51–3)
- ^{1} Playing statistics correct to the end of 1957.

Career highlights
- Carlton Premiers 1945, 1947; Carlton Best & Fairest 1953; Victorian Representative: 12 times. 1953, 54, 57.; Captain/Coach Victoria 1954 & 1957; Carlton Captain 1952–1957; Carlton Coach 1959–1964 (Runners up 1962); Carlton Team of the Century 2001 (Deputy Vice Captain); AFL Life Member 2001; Official Carlton Legend (10th)2006; AFL Hall of Fame 2009; AFL Life Member; Named Carlton's 11th Greatest Player in the 150th Year Celebrations 2014.

Ken Hands (26 October 1926 – 22 December 2017) was an Australian rules footballer in the Victorian Football League (VFL). He played for Carlton from 1945 to 1957, playing in premiership-winning teams in 1945 and 1947, and coached Carlton from 1959 to 1964, taking them to the grand final in 1962.

After the death of teammate Alex Way on 7 November 2014, Hands was the last surviving member of Carlton's 1945 Premiership team, and he was also the last surviving member of their 1947 Premiership team. On 22 December 2017, Hands died at the age of 91.
