= Charlie McInnes =

Australian rules footballer

Personal information
- Full name: Charles Vivian John McInnes
- Born: 21 August 1916; Nyah, Victoria
- Died: 3 December 1992 (aged 76)
- Original team: Tyntynder
- Debut: Round 1, 1938, Carlton vs. Hawthorn, at Glenferrie Oval
- Height: 174 cm (5 ft 9 in)
- Weight: 88 kg (194 lb)

Playing career^{1}
Years	Club	Games (Goals)
1938–1946	Carlton	118 (92)
- ^{1} Playing statistics correct to the end of 1946.

Charles Vivian John McInnes (21 August 1916 – 3 December 1992) was an Australian rules footballer who played with Carlton in the VFL.

A follower and half forward flanker, McInnes played many of his 118 games at Carlton as their 19th man. It was in that role that he played in Carlton's 1938 and 1945 premierships.

During his football career McInnes enlisted in the Australian Army to serve in World War II, serving for 16 months within Victoria.

In Round 15 of the 1943 VFL season, McInnes kicked a career-high six goals against North Melbourne.

Despite his relatively small stature, McInnes was known as a tough and physical player. In his 1963 autobiography, Boots and All, Lou Richards recalled lining up against McInnes. Richards claimed that shortly after the game began, McInnes delivered a fierce punch, leaving Richards with cuts to his nose and mouth.
