= Ted Tuohill =

Australian rules footballer

Personal information
- Full name: Edward James Tuohill
- Born: 19 January 1916; Coburg, Victoria
- Died: 29 March 2005 (aged 89)
- Original team: Geelong CYMS
- Height: 184 cm (6 ft 0 in)
- Weight: 83 kg (183 lb)

Playing career^{1}
Years	Club	Games (Goals)
1938–1940	Geelong	11 (10)
1943–1944	Carlton	15 (6)
Total		26 (16)
- ^{1} Playing statistics correct to the end of 1944.

Edward James Tuohill (19 January 1916 – 29 March 2005) was an Australian rules footballer who played with Carlton and Geelong in the Victorian Football League (VFL).
