= Len Hustler =

Australian rules footballer

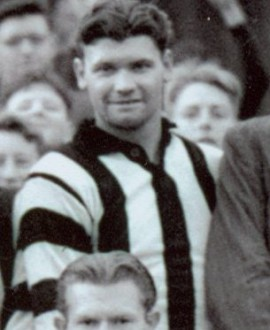
- Hustler during his Collingwood career

Personal information
- Full name: Len Hustler
- Born: 30 September 1920
- Died: 14 September 1981 (aged 60)
- Original team: Abbotsford
- Height: 185 cm (6 ft 1 in)
- Weight: 87 kg (192 lb)
- Position: Ruck

Playing career^{1}
| Years | Club | Games (Goals) |
| 1942–43, 1945 | Collingwood | 8 (7) |
- ^{1} Playing statistics correct to the end of 1945.

Len Hustler (30 September 1920 – 14 September 1981) was an Australian rules footballer who played with Collingwood in the Victorian Football League (VFL).
