= Don Grossman =

Australian rules footballer

Personal information
- Full name: Donald Clarence Grossman
- Born: 27 December 1920; Brunswick, Victoria
- Died: 5 August 2004 (aged 83); Warrnambool
- Original team: Port Melbourne (VFA)
- Height: 182 cm (6 ft 0 in)
- Weight: 80 kg (176 lb)
- Position: Ruckman

Playing career^{1}
Years	Club	Games (Goals)
1940–1947	South Melbourne	93 (32)
- ^{1} Playing statistics correct to the end of 1947.

Donald Clarence Grossman (27 December 1920 – 5 August 2004) was an Australian rules footballer who played with South Melbourne in the Victorian Football League (VFL).

A Port Melbourne recruit from the Victorian Football Association (VFA), Grossman started his VFL career in 1940. He didn't play at all in 1943 due to his Royal Australian Air Force commitments. He appeared in all 22 games for South Melbourne in 1945 and featured prominently in the "Bloodbath Grand Final", where Carlton defeated South Melbourne in a spiteful encounter. Starting in the back pocket, Grossman, who would later be an amateur boxer, played as a ruckman and was reported for striking Carlton's Jim Mooring. He was found guilty and missed the opening eight rounds of the 1946 VFL season through suspension.

Grossman left South Melbourne in 1948 to take up an offer to captain-coach Warrnambool. He remained in that position for six years before switching to South Warrnambool in 1954 and coaching them to a premiership in his first year. In 1951, while at Warrnambool, he won the Hampden Football League's best and fairest award.

Grossman remained in Warrnambool for the rest of his life. He was a contributor to the local newspaper on football related matters and was editing the history of the Warrnambool Football club when he died.

== Books ==
- Bond, F.R. & Grossman, D. (1979) Evergreen Hampden, PAP Book Co.: Warrnambool. ISBN 9780868251080.
- Cole, R.J. & Grossman, D. (2008) Birth of the Blues, Warrnambool Football Netball Club: Allansford, Vic. ISBN 9780959271539.
