= Alex Way =

Australian rules footballer

Personal information
- Full name: Alexander John Francis Way
- Born: 13 August 1925
- Died: 7 November 2014 (aged 89); Malvern, Victoria
- Original team: Coburg Rangers
- Height: 180 cm (5 ft 11 in)
- Weight: 78 kg (172 lb)
- Position: Half forward

Playing career^{1}
Years	Club	Games (Goals)
1944–48	Carlton	32 (27)
- ^{1} Playing statistics correct to the end of 1948.

Alexander John Francis Way (13 August 1925 – 7 November 2014) was an Australian rules footballer who played with Carlton in the Victorian Football League (VFL) during the 1940s.

Way played six games in his debut season, for 12 goals, five of them in a match against Geelong. He was recruited from the Coburg Rangers and was a member of Carlton's 1945 premiership team.

Way, the nephew of former Carlton player Jack Way, later moved to Tasmania where he played for City and later Longford in the Northern Tasmanian Football Association. He then returned to Melbourne in 1963, where he lived in the south-east suburbs until his death in November 2014.
