= Rod McLean =

Australian rules footballer, born 1915

Personal information
- Full name: Roderick Findlay McLean
- Born: 22 October 1915; Campbellfield, Victoria
- Died: 14 September 1979 (aged 63); Parkville, Victoria
- Original team: Fawkner
- Height: 182 cm (6 ft 0 in)
- Weight: 88 kg (194 lb)

Playing career^{1}
Years	Club	Games (Goals)
1935–1946	Carlton	128 (33)
- ^{1} Playing statistics correct to the end of 1946.

Roderick Findlay McLean (22 October 1915 – 14 September 1979) was an Australian rules footballer who played with Carlton in the VFL. He is the father of Richmond and Carlton footballer Ricky McLean.

A ruckman, McLean was a premiership player with Carlton in 1938 and 1945. Late in the 1942 season he was found guilty of disputing the decisions of a field umpire, abusive language and unseemly conduct during a game which resulted in a 16 games suspension.

McLean served in the Australian Army for three years during World War II.
