= Wal Alexander =

Australian rules footballer

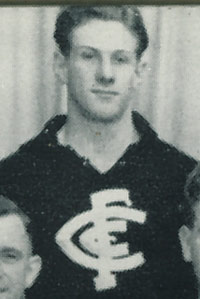
- Alexander in 1945

Personal information
- Born: 22 October 1923
- Died: 17 October 1995 (aged 71)
- Original team: Wodonga
- Height: 178 cm (5 ft 10 in)
- Weight: 76 kg (168 lb)

Playing career^{1}
Years	Club	Games (Goals)
1945–47	Carlton	13 (0)
1948	Fitzroy	7 (0)
Total		20 (0)
- ^{1} Playing statistics correct to the end of 1948.

Wal Alexander (22 October 1923 – 17 October 1995) was an Australian rules footballer who played with Carlton and Fitzroy in the Victorian Football League (VFL).
