= Hal Hanton =

Australian rules footballer

Personal information
- Full name: Harold Roy Hanton
- Born: 25 May 1922; Frankston, Victoria
- Died: 14 September 2011 (aged 89)
- Original teams: Army & Frankston
- Height: 183 cm (6 ft 0 in)
- Weight: 76 kg (168 lb)

Playing career^{1}
Years	Club	Games (Goals)
1945	Carlton	1 (1)
- ^{1} Playing statistics correct to the end of 1945.

Harold Roy "Hal" Hanton (25 May 1922 – 14 September 2011) was an Australian rules footballer who played with Carlton in the Victorian Football League (VFL).

== Family ==
The son of William Mark Hanton (1878-1956), and Ellen Clement Hanton (1883-1962), née Annand, Harold Roy Hanton was born at Frankston, Victoria on 25 May 1922.

His twin brother, Alexander George "Alex" Hanton (1922-2011), also played for Carlton in the VFL.

Harold married Jean Cecile Ogle on 26 May 1951.

== Death ==
He died on 14 September 2011, just 9 days after Alex's death.
