= 1945 VFL season =

49th season of the Victorian Football League (VFL)

1945 VFL premiership season
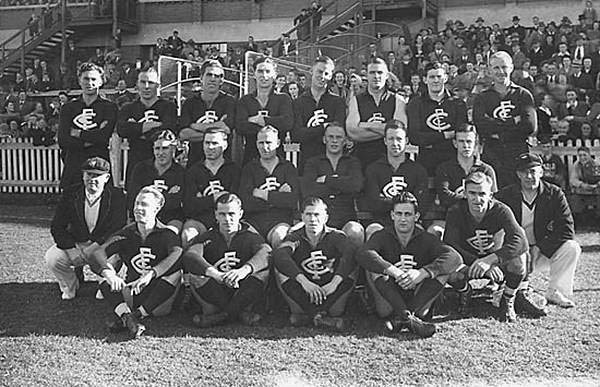
- Carlton Football Club, premiers
- Teams: 12
- Premiers: Carlton; 7th premiership
- Minor premiers: South Melbourne; 6th minor premiership
- Brownlow Medallist: Not awarded
- Leading goalkicker medallist: Fred Fanning (Melbourne)
- Matches played: 124
- Highest: 62,986

The 1945 VFL season was the 49th season of the Victorian Football League (VFL), the highest level senior Australian rules football competition in Victoria. The season featured twelve clubs, ran from 21 April until 29 September, and comprised a 20-game home-and-away season followed by a finals series featuring the top four clubs.

The premiership was won by the Carlton Football Club for the seventh time, after it defeated South Melbourne by 28 points in the 1945 VFL Grand Final.

== Background ==
In 1945, the VFL competition consisted of twelve teams of 18 on-the-field players each, plus one substitute player, known as the 19th man. A player could be substituted for any reason; however, once substituted, a player could not return to the field of play under any circumstances.

Teams played each other in a home-and-away season of 20 rounds; matches 12 to 20 were the "home-and-way reverse" of matches 1 to 9.

The determination of the 1945 season's fixtures were greatly complicated by the fact that both the Melbourne Cricket Ground and the Lake Oval were appropriated for military use and, because of this, Melbourne shared the Punt Road Oval with Richmond as their home ground, and South Melbourne shared the Junction Oval with St Kilda as their home ground.

Once the 20 round home-and-away season had finished, the 1945 VFL Premiers were determined by the specific format and conventions of the Page–McIntyre system.

== Home-and-away season ==
=== Round 1 ===
Home team	Home team score	Away team	Away team score	Venue	Crowd	Date
St Kilda	10.17 (77)	South Melbourne	17.16 (118)	Junction Oval	17,000	21 April 1945
Essendon	22.18 (150)	Hawthorn	12.7 (79)	Windy Hill	11,000	21 April 1945
Collingwood	13.13 (91)	North Melbourne	10.10 (70)	Victoria Park	13,000	21 April 1945
Carlton	13.9 (87)	Melbourne	15.18 (108)	Princes Park	16,000	21 April 1945
Richmond	14.11 (95)	Footscray	16.9 (105)	Punt Road Oval	24,000	21 April 1945
Geelong	10.8 (68)	Fitzroy	15.16 (106)	Kardinia Park	10,000	21 April 1945

=== Round 2 ===
Home team	Home team score	Away team	Away team score	Venue	Crowd	Date
North Melbourne	7.18 (60)	Richmond	8.17 (65)	Arden Street Oval	11,500	28 April 1945
Melbourne	17.16 (118)	St Kilda	7.7 (49)	Punt Road Oval	8,000	28 April 1945
Footscray	18.9 (117)	Geelong	12.9 (81)	Western Oval	11,500	28 April 1945
Fitzroy	8.16 (64)	Essendon	9.10 (64)	Brunswick Street Oval	19,000	28 April 1945
South Melbourne	12.14 (86)	Collingwood	11.10 (76)	Junction Oval	19,000	28 April 1945
Hawthorn	16.10 (106)	Carlton	9.18 (72)	Glenferrie Oval	11,000	28 April 1945

=== Round 3 ===
Home team	Home team score	Away team	Away team score	Venue	Crowd	Date
Richmond	13.11 (89)	South Melbourne	15.19 (109)	Punt Road Oval	27,000	5 May 1945
Fitzroy	12.9 (81)	Footscray	14.14 (98)	Brunswick Street Oval	20,000	5 May 1945
Collingwood	10.21 (81)	Melbourne	11.12 (78)	Victoria Park	12,000	5 May 1945
St Kilda	15.10 (100)	Hawthorn	11.13 (79)	Junction Oval	10,000	5 May 1945
North Melbourne	14.15 (99)	Geelong	10.15 (75)	Arden Street Oval	6,000	5 May 1945
Essendon	22.18 (150)	Carlton	7.8 (50)	Windy Hill	16,000	5 May 1945

=== Round 4 ===
Home team	Home team score	Away team	Away team score	Venue	Crowd	Date
Melbourne	9.11 (65)	Richmond	13.7 (85)	Punt Road Oval	23,000	12 May 1945
Geelong	9.13 (67)	South Melbourne	10.23 (83)	Kardinia Park	10,500	12 May 1945
Footscray	11.13 (79)	North Melbourne	14.8 (92)	Western Oval	15,000	12 May 1945
Collingwood	13.23 (101)	Hawthorn	9.9 (63)	Victoria Park	11,000	12 May 1945
Carlton	12.12 (84)	Fitzroy	11.11 (77)	Princes Park	12,000	12 May 1945
St Kilda	14.17 (101)	Essendon	23.18 (156)	Junction Oval	12,000	12 May 1945

=== Round 5 ===
Home team	Home team score	Away team	Away team score	Venue	Crowd	Date
Hawthorn	15.7 (97)	Richmond	20.11 (131)	Glenferrie Oval	13,000	19 May 1945
Fitzroy	11.10 (76)	North Melbourne	13.14 (92)	Brunswick Street Oval	14,000	19 May 1945
Carlton	12.18 (90)	St Kilda	11.13 (79)	Princes Park	11,000	19 May 1945
Melbourne	18.12 (120)	Geelong	15.10 (100)	Punt Road Oval	7,000	19 May 1945
South Melbourne	15.9 (99)	Footscray	12.11 (83)	Junction Oval	30,000	19 May 1945
Essendon	12.16 (88)	Collingwood	11.21 (87)	Windy Hill	17,000	19 May 1945

=== Round 6 ===
Home team	Home team score	Away team	Away team score	Venue	Crowd	Date
North Melbourne	9.12 (66)	South Melbourne	8.10 (58)	Arden Street Oval	25,000	26 May 1945
Geelong	10.16 (76)	Hawthorn	10.8 (68)	Kardinia Park	10,000	26 May 1945
Footscray	11.16 (82)	Melbourne	7.13 (55)	Western Oval	13,000	26 May 1945
St Kilda	8.20 (68)	Fitzroy	12.21 (93)	Junction Oval	10,000	26 May 1945
Richmond	12.11 (83)	Essendon	9.17 (71)	Punt Road Oval	28,000	26 May 1945
Collingwood	15.18 (108)	Carlton	12.11 (83)	Victoria Park	18,000	26 May 1945

=== Round 7 ===
Home team	Home team score	Away team	Away team score	Venue	Crowd	Date
Melbourne	10.12 (72)	North Melbourne	18.11 (119)	Punt Road Oval	14,000	2 June 1945
Fitzroy	7.23 (65)	South Melbourne	10.15 (75)	Brunswick Street Oval	19,000	2 June 1945
Essendon	14.28 (112)	Geelong	9.10 (64)	Windy Hill	8,000	2 June 1945
Carlton	12.17 (89)	Richmond	13.16 (94)	Princes Park	21,000	2 June 1945
Hawthorn	11.15 (81)	Footscray	17.14 (116)	Glenferrie Oval	10,000	2 June 1945
St Kilda	7.12 (54)	Collingwood	19.16 (130)	Junction Oval	12,000	2 June 1945

=== Round 8 ===
Home team	Home team score	Away team	Away team score	Venue	Crowd	Date
Richmond	16.15 (111)	St Kilda	13.6 (84)	Punt Road Oval	15,000	9 June 1945
South Melbourne	12.16 (88)	Melbourne	9.4 (58)	Junction Oval	18,000	9 June 1945
North Melbourne	16.10 (106)	Hawthorn	10.8 (68)	Arden Street Oval	7,000	9 June 1945
Footscray	12.15 (87)	Essendon	7.14 (56)	Western Oval	23,000	9 June 1945
Fitzroy	23.15 (153)	Collingwood	8.10 (58)	Brunswick Street Oval	20,000	9 June 1945
Geelong	10.9 (69)	Carlton	14.21 (105)	Kardinia Park	11,000	9 June 1945

=== Round 9 ===
Home team	Home team score	Away team	Away team score	Venue	Crowd	Date
Hawthorn	12.10 (82)	South Melbourne	20.10 (130)	Glenferrie Oval	13,000	16 June 1945
Essendon	12.20 (92)	North Melbourne	18.14 (122)	Windy Hill	20,000	16 June 1945
Collingwood	13.12 (90)	Richmond	8.13 (61)	Victoria Park	20,000	16 June 1945
Carlton	11.11 (77)	Footscray	11.20 (86)	Princes Park	20,000	16 June 1945
St Kilda	14.17 (101)	Geelong	14.12 (96)	Junction Oval	7,000	16 June 1945
Melbourne	11.15 (81)	Fitzroy	14.17 (101)	Punt Road Oval	13,000	16 June 1945

=== Round 10 ===
Home team	Home team score	Away team	Away team score	Venue	Crowd	Date
Footscray	16.15 (111)	St Kilda	7.6 (48)	Western Oval	9,000	23 June 1945
Fitzroy	12.14 (86)	Richmond	13.11 (89)	Brunswick Street Oval	18,000	23 June 1945
Melbourne	15.14 (104)	Hawthorn	12.14 (86)	Punt Road Oval	6,000	23 June 1945
South Melbourne	12.15 (87)	Essendon	5.11 (41)	Junction Oval	22,000	23 June 1945
Geelong	7.5 (47)	Collingwood	21.18 (144)	Kardinia Park	9,000	23 June 1945
North Melbourne	7.17 (59)	Carlton	12.12 (84)	Arden Street Oval	15,000	23 June 1945

=== Round 11 ===
Home team	Home team score	Away team	Away team score	Venue	Crowd	Date
Essendon	7.12 (54)	Melbourne	9.14 (68)	Windy Hill	8,000	30 June 1945
Collingwood	9.10 (64)	Footscray	10.9 (69)	Victoria Park	19,000	30 June 1945
Carlton	8.8 (56)	South Melbourne	7.8 (50)	Princes Park	25,500	30 June 1945
St Kilda	6.15 (51)	North Melbourne	6.21 (57)	Junction Oval	7,500	30 June 1945
Richmond	14.28 (112)	Geelong	8.8 (56)	Punt Road Oval	11,000	30 June 1945
Hawthorn	7.8 (50)	Fitzroy	10.15 (75)	Glenferrie Oval	7,500	30 June 1945

=== Round 12 ===
Home team	Home team score	Away team	Away team score	Venue	Crowd	Date
Footscray	15.12 (102)	Richmond	11.8 (74)	Western Oval	17,000	7 July 1945
Fitzroy	17.27 (129)	Geelong	4.9 (33)	Brunswick Street Oval	7,000	7 July 1945
South Melbourne	14.22 (106)	St Kilda	6.14 (50)	Junction Oval	9,000	7 July 1945
Hawthorn	15.17 (107)	Essendon	7.12 (54)	Glenferrie Oval	5,500	7 July 1945
North Melbourne	11.11 (77)	Collingwood	13.5 (83)	Arden Street Oval	14,000	7 July 1945
Melbourne	12.8 (80)	Carlton	12.9 (81)	Punt Road Oval	16,000	7 July 1945

=== Round 13 ===
Home team	Home team score	Away team	Away team score	Venue	Crowd	Date
Essendon	7.14 (56)	Fitzroy	11.14 (80)	Windy Hill	10,000	14 July 1945
Collingwood	11.14 (80)	South Melbourne	7.12 (54)	Victoria Park	24,000	14 July 1945
Carlton	13.12 (90)	Hawthorn	8.11 (59)	Princes Park	10,000	14 July 1945
Richmond	18.10 (118)	North Melbourne	15.9 (99)	Punt Road Oval	21,000	14 July 1945
St Kilda	9.10 (64)	Melbourne	10.23 (83)	Junction Oval	6,000	14 July 1945
Geelong	11.14 (80)	Footscray	13.19 (97)	Kardinia Park	6,000	14 July 1945

=== Round 14 ===
Home team	Home team score	Away team	Away team score	Venue	Crowd	Date
Hawthorn	15.15 (105)	St Kilda	13.3 (81)	Glenferrie Oval	5,000	21 July 1945
Geelong	9.9 (63)	North Melbourne	13.19 (97)	Kardinia Park	7,500	21 July 1945
Carlton	11.9 (75)	Essendon	10.18 (78)	Princes Park	14,000	21 July 1945
South Melbourne	14.11 (95)	Richmond	10.17 (77)	Junction Oval	32,000	21 July 1945
Footscray	9.7 (61)	Fitzroy	8.15 (63)	Western Oval	19,000	21 July 1945
Melbourne	10.17 (77)	Collingwood	16.16 (112)	Punt Road Oval	15,000	21 July 1945

=== Round 15 ===
Home team	Home team score	Away team	Away team score	Venue	Crowd	Date
Essendon	18.15 (123)	St Kilda	3.6 (24)	Windy Hill	5,000	28 July 1945
Richmond	13.14 (92)	Melbourne	11.13 (79)	Punt Road Oval	13,000	28 July 1945
South Melbourne	18.27 (135)	Geelong	10.7 (67)	Junction Oval	8,000	28 July 1945
North Melbourne	11.7 (73)	Footscray	8.6 (54)	Arden Street Oval	12,000	28 July 1945
Hawthorn	9.13 (67)	Collingwood	15.9 (99)	Glenferrie Oval	8,000	28 July 1945
Fitzroy	7.12 (54)	Carlton	9.4 (58)	Brunswick Street Oval	16,000	28 July 1945

=== Round 16 ===
Home team	Home team score	Away team	Away team score	Venue	Crowd	Date
Geelong	7.14 (56)	Melbourne	17.13 (115)	Kardinia Park	7,000	4 August 1945
Footscray	7.13 (55)	South Melbourne	8.8 (56)	Western Oval	27,000	4 August 1945
Collingwood	16.8 (104)	Essendon	10.15 (75)	Victoria Park	19,000	4 August 1945
Richmond	15.15 (105)	Hawthorn	19.7 (121)	Punt Road Oval	13,000	4 August 1945
North Melbourne	12.6 (78)	Fitzroy	4.9 (33)	Arden Street Oval	14,000	4 August 1945
St Kilda	7.15 (57)	Carlton	11.13 (79)	Junction Oval	10,000	4 August 1945

=== Round 17 ===
Home team	Home team score	Away team	Away team score	Venue	Crowd	Date
Fitzroy	17.27 (129)	St Kilda	8.14 (62)	Brunswick Street Oval	5,000	11 August 1945
Essendon	14.22 (106)	Richmond	10.13 (73)	Windy Hill	12,000	11 August 1945
Carlton	13.11 (89)	Collingwood	13.5 (83)	Princes Park	25,000	11 August 1945
South Melbourne	21.8 (134)	North Melbourne	10.16 (76)	Junction Oval	26,000	11 August 1945
Hawthorn	14.21 (105)	Geelong	9.13 (67)	Glenferrie Oval	5,500	11 August 1945
Melbourne	12.18 (90)	Footscray	12.9 (81)	Punt Road Oval	12,000	11 August 1945

=== Round 18 ===
Home team	Home team score	Away team	Away team score	Venue	Crowd	Date
Footscray	15.15 (105)	Hawthorn	13.11 (89)	Western Oval	12,000	18 August 1945
Collingwood	17.19 (121)	St Kilda	5.12 (42)	Victoria Park	8,000	18 August 1945
North Melbourne	11.17 (83)	Melbourne	8.10 (58)	Arden Street Oval	8,000	18 August 1945
South Melbourne	10.13 (73)	Fitzroy	11.16 (82)	Junction Oval	20,000	18 August 1945
Geelong	14.7 (91)	Essendon	16.13 (109)	Kardinia Park	8,500	18 August 1945
Richmond	12.9 (81)	Carlton	13.15 (93)	Punt Road Oval	38,000	18 August 1945

=== Round 19 ===
Home team	Home team score	Away team	Away team score	Venue	Crowd	Date
Melbourne	10.13 (73)	South Melbourne	12.20 (92)	Punt Road Oval	17,000	25 August 1945
Hawthorn	11.11 (77)	North Melbourne	10.10 (70)	Glenferrie Oval	12,000	25 August 1945
Essendon	15.17 (107)	Footscray	9.13 (67)	Windy Hill	20,000	25 August 1945
Collingwood	16.7 (103)	Fitzroy	10.17 (77)	Victoria Park	24,000	25 August 1945
Carlton	23.23 (161)	Geelong	9.13 (67)	Princes Park	9,000	25 August 1945
St Kilda	7.6 (48)	Richmond	13.22 (100)	Junction Oval	8,000	25 August 1945

=== Round 20 ===
Home team	Home team score	Away team	Away team score	Venue	Crowd	Date
Geelong	13.14 (92)	St Kilda	9.11 (65)	Kardinia Park	7,500	1 September 1945
Fitzroy	14.22 (106)	Melbourne	15.11 (101)	Brunswick Street Oval	5,000	1 September 1945
South Melbourne	16.16 (112)	Hawthorn	11.10 (76)	Junction Oval	12,000	1 September 1945
North Melbourne	14.17 (101)	Essendon	13.17 (95)	Arden Street Oval	12,000	1 September 1945
Richmond	8.19 (67)	Collingwood	12.15 (87)	Punt Road Oval	23,000	1 September 1945
Footscray	8.14 (62)	Carlton	16.19 (115)	Western Oval	30,000	1 September 1945

== Ladder ==
(P)	Premiers
	Qualified for finals

#	Team	P	W	L	D	PF	PA	%	Pts
1	South Melbourne	20	16	4	0	1840	1396	131.8	64
2	Collingwood	20	15	5	0	1902	1477	128.8	60
3	North Melbourne	20	13	7	0	1696	1526	111.1	52
4	Carlton (P)	20	13	7	0	1718	1607	106.9	52
5	Footscray	20	12	8	0	1717	1576	108.9	48
6	Fitzroy	20	11	8	1	1730	1452	119.1	46
7	Richmond	20	11	9	0	1802	1742	103.4	44
8	Essendon	20	10	9	1	1837	1614	113.8	42
9	Melbourne	20	8	12	0	1683	1699	99.1	32
10	Hawthorn	20	6	14	0	1665	1944	85.6	24
11	Geelong	20	2	18	0	1415	2180	64.9	8
12	St Kilda	20	2	18	0	1305	2097	62.2	8

Rules for classification: 1. premiership points; 2. percentage; 3. points for
Average score: 84.6
Source: AFL Tables

== Finals series ==
=== Semi-finals ===
Home team	Score	Away team	Score	Venue	Crowd	Date
North Melbourne	8.20 (68)	Carlton	14.10 (94)	Princes Park	54,846	8 September
South Melbourne	13.10 (88)	Collingwood	11.11 (77)	Princes Park	46,224	15 September

=== Preliminary final ===
Home team	Score	Away team	Score	Venue	Crowd	Date
Collingwood	12.8 (80)	Carlton	13.12 (90)	Princes Park	41,305	22 September

== Season notes ==
- The home-and-away season was expanded to 20 rounds.
- The VFL adopted the "downfield free kick" rule, such that if a player is fouled after disposing of the ball, the free kick is taken at the spot where the ball lands by the nearest team-mate, not at the spot of the foul.
- St Kilda changed its nickname from Seagulls to Panthers in the 1945 season, after a supporter had presented the club with an oil painting of a panther to be hung in the club rooms. The change never truly caught on, and fell out of common use relatively quickly.
- Essendon kick an identical score of 22.18 (150) in Rounds 1 & 3, recording big wins in the process. They fade after this, and finish 8th with a 10-9-1 record.
- South Melbourne's captain and Brownlow Medal winner Herbie Matthews and South Melbourne forward Keith Smith were dropped from the Round 13 match by their club for refusing to play in the positions they were directed to play in.
- After its Round 14 loss to Essendon, Carlton won its next nine consecutive matches (including the Grand Final).
- North Melbourne made the finals for the first time since entering the VFL in 1925. Of the three clubs to enter the league in 1925, only Hawthorn had not yet made the finals, and would not do so until 1957.
- The 1945 second semi-final was South Melbourne's last finals win as "South Melbourne". The club did not play finals again until 1970, and did not win another final until 1996, after it had moved to Sydney – a fifty-one-year gap.
- Carlton's 1945 premiership win was the first time since the Page–McIntyre system had been adopted in 1931 that a team from fourth place on the home-and-away ladder won the Grand Final.
- The Grand Final was held at Princes Park for the last time. It has been held at the MCG every year since, except 1991 (due to redevelopment works at the ground), 2020 and 2021 (both due to the COVID-19 pandemic preventing the match being played at the ground).
- The Grand Final, played in extremely wet, muddy conditions, is remembered as "the Bloodbath" for its overall continuous violence (on the field and amongst the fans), and its plethora of crude king hits and brawls (many of which were broken up with the assistance of team officials and the police). The Melbourne tabloid newspaper, The Truth, called it "the most repugnant spectacle League football has ever known", with ten players reported for a total of sixteen offences.

== Awards ==
- The 1945 VFL Premiership team was Carlton.
- The VFL's leading goalkicker was Fred Fanning of Melbourne with 67 goals.
- No Brownlow Medal was awarded in 1945.
- St Kilda took the "wooden spoon" in 1945.
- The seconds premiership was won by Footscray. Footscray 9.16 (70) defeated Fitzroy 9.3 (57) in the Grand Final, played as a stand-alone match on Saturday 22 September at Victoria Park before a crowd of 6,000.

== Sources ==
- 1945 VFL season at AFL Tables
- 1945 VFL season at Australian Football
