= Jim Mooring =

Australian rules footballer, born 1917

Personal information
- Full name: James Teague Mooring
- Born: 14 October 1917; Piangil, Victoria
- Died: 20 October 2007 (aged 90); Bendigo, Victoria
- Original teams: Piangil, Creswick, Maryborough
- Debut: Round 1, 1940, Carlton vs. Geelong, at Corio Oval
- Height: 170 cm (5 ft 7 in)
- Weight: 74 kg (163 lb)
- Position: Rover

Playing career^{1}
Years	Club	Games (Goals)
1940–1949	Carlton	126 (161)
- ^{1} Playing statistics correct to the end of 1949.

Career highlights
- Premiership Player: 1945; Club leading goalkicker 1944; Club Best & Fairest 1942; Named one of Carlton's 150 Greatest Players

James Teague Mooring (14 October 1917 – 20 October 2007) was an Australian rules footballer in the Victorian Football League (VFL).

== Early life ==
Mooring, the son of James Wilfred Mooring and Ellen Adelaide Mooring, née Teague, was originally from Piangil (near Swan Hill).

Mooring was a natural sportsman. His sporting talents extended also to tennis, cricket, billiards and golf.

Mooring was originally invited to train with St Kilda, but the club failed to find him a job so he returned to Piangil. Searching for work Mooring moved to Creswick and initially played with Creswick, under Jack Wunhym, then played with Maryborough in the Bendigo Football League in 1939.

== VFL career ==
A chance encounter with then Carlton coach Brighton Diggins in Creswick, signed him to the Blues. He was judged Carlton's Best First Year Player in 1940, Most Consistent Player at the club in 1941, Best and Fairest in 1942 and 2nd Best and Fairest in 1944 as well as Best Clubman in 1943.

Mooring was Vice-captain in 1942 and 1943, and club leading goalkicker in 1944.

Mooring was a member of Carlton's 1945 VFL premiership side in a game that was referred to simply as "The Bloodbath". Mooring kicked 2 goals. He missed out on playing in the 1947 premiership because of injury. Mooring latter career was riddled with injuries to his knee, shoulder and hand.

Mooring was Life Member of the Blues, died in Bendigo on 20 October 2007.

In April 2014, Mooring was posthumously named as one of Carlton's 150 Greatest Players.
