= 1947 VFL season =

51st season of the Victorian Football League (VFL)

1947 VFL premiership season
- Teams: 12
- Premiers: Carlton; 8th premiership
- Minor premiers: Carlton; 11th minor premiership
- Brownlow Medallist: Bert Deacon (Carlton)
- Leading goalkicker medallist: Fred Fanning (Melbourne)
- Matches played: 118
- Highest: 85,793

The 1947 VFL season was the 51st season of the Victorian Football League (VFL), the highest level senior Australian rules football competition in Victoria. The season featured twelve clubs, ran from 19 April until 27 September, and comprised a 19-game home-and-away season followed by a finals series featuring the top four clubs.

The premiership was won by the Carlton Football Club for the eighth time, after it defeated Essendon by one point in the 1947 VFL Grand Final.

== Background ==
In 1947, the VFL competition consisted of twelve teams of 18 on-the-field players each, plus two substitute players, known as the 19th man and the 20th man. A player could be substituted for any reason; however, once substituted, a player could not return to the field of play under any circumstances.

Teams played each other in a home-and-away season of 19 rounds; matches 12 to 19 were the "home-and-way reverse" of matches 1 to 8.

Once the 19 round home-and-away season had finished, the 1947 VFL Premiers were determined by the specific format and conventions of the Page–McIntyre system.

== Home-and-away season ==
=== Round 1 ===
Home team	Home team score	Away team	Away team score	Venue	Crowd	Date
Geelong	19.15 (129)	Hawthorn	12.12 (84)	Kardinia Park	13,000	19 April 1947
Essendon	16.23 (119)	South Melbourne	10.8 (68)	Windy Hill	19,000	19 April 1947
Collingwood	20.18 (138)	Fitzroy	14.8 (92)	Victoria Park	24,000	19 April 1947
Carlton	17.20 (122)	Melbourne	16.13 (109)	Princes Park	24,000	19 April 1947
Richmond	18.27 (135)	North Melbourne	15.14 (104)	Punt Road Oval	20,000	19 April 1947
St Kilda	12.16 (88)	Footscray	22.17 (149)	Junction Oval	14,000	19 April 1947

=== Round 2 ===
Home team	Home team score	Away team	Away team score	Venue	Crowd	Date
North Melbourne	8.11 (59)	St Kilda	8.13 (61)	Arden Street Oval	8,000	26 April 1947
Fitzroy	13.22 (100)	Richmond	11.11 (77)	Brunswick Street Oval	22,000	26 April 1947
Melbourne	14.25 (109)	Geelong	11.7 (73)	MCG	12,000	26 April 1947
Footscray	15.13 (103)	Essendon	13.11 (89)	Western Oval	22,000	26 April 1947
Hawthorn	13.9 (87)	Collingwood	19.20 (134)	Glenferrie Oval	15,000	26 April 1947
South Melbourne	12.12 (84)	Carlton	9.16 (70)	Lake Oval	30,000	26 April 1947

=== Round 3 ===
Home team	Home team score	Away team	Away team score	Venue	Crowd	Date
Fitzroy	12.20 (92)	Melbourne	12.11 (83)	Brunswick Street Oval	18,000	3 May 1947
Essendon	21.10 (136)	St Kilda	19.11 (125)	Windy Hill	13,000	3 May 1947
South Melbourne	10.18 (78)	North Melbourne	12.10 (82)	Lake Oval	18,000	3 May 1947
Hawthorn	12.10 (82)	Footscray	20.14 (134)	Glenferrie Oval	11,000	3 May 1947
Geelong	12.17 (89)	Collingwood	14.24 (108)	Kardinia Park	14,600	3 May 1947
Richmond	5.18 (48)	Carlton	17.19 (121)	Punt Road Oval	32,000	3 May 1947

=== Round 4 ===
Home team	Home team score	Away team	Away team score	Venue	Crowd	Date
Collingwood	19.24 (138)	South Melbourne	12.14 (86)	Victoria Park	25,000	10 May 1947
Carlton	16.16 (112)	Footscray	7.16 (58)	Princes Park	37,000	10 May 1947
Richmond	10.12 (72)	Melbourne	18.12 (120)	Punt Road Oval	16,000	10 May 1947
St Kilda	10.17 (77)	Hawthorn	12.12 (84)	Junction Oval	10,500	10 May 1947
North Melbourne	4.15 (39)	Fitzroy	19.26 (140)	Arden Street Oval	12,000	10 May 1947
Geelong	11.17 (83)	Essendon	16.19 (115)	Kardinia Park	14,500	10 May 1947

=== Round 5 ===
Home team	Home team score	Away team	Away team score	Venue	Crowd	Date
Hawthorn	16.11 (107)	Richmond	10.9 (69)	Glenferrie Oval	13,000	17 May 1947
Footscray	17.18 (120)	North Melbourne	11.13 (79)	Western Oval	13,000	17 May 1947
Fitzroy	19.18 (132)	St Kilda	7.14 (56)	Brunswick Street Oval	10,000	17 May 1947
South Melbourne	13.9 (87)	Geelong	15.16 (106)	Lake Oval	12,000	17 May 1947
Melbourne	15.5 (95)	Collingwood	9.16 (70)	MCG	33,500	17 May 1947
Essendon	8.16 (64)	Carlton	14.7 (91)	Windy Hill	32,000	17 May 1947

=== Round 6 ===
Home team	Home team score	Away team	Away team score	Venue	Crowd	Date
Hawthorn	9.12 (66)	Melbourne	12.9 (81)	Glenferrie Oval	16,000	24 May 1947
Fitzroy	8.15 (63)	South Melbourne	15.11 (101)	Brunswick Street Oval	16,000	24 May 1947
Richmond	18.18 (126)	Geelong	11.11 (77)	Punt Road Oval	14,500	24 May 1947
North Melbourne	15.12 (102)	Essendon	14.10 (94)	Arden Street Oval	12,000	24 May 1947
Footscray	13.12 (90)	Collingwood	10.16 (76)	Western Oval	26,000	24 May 1947
St Kilda	7.11 (53)	Carlton	23.17 (155)	Junction Oval	18,000	24 May 1947

=== Round 7 ===
Home team	Home team score	Away team	Away team score	Venue	Crowd	Date
Geelong	7.12 (54)	St Kilda	6.13 (49)	Kardinia Park	13,500	31 May 1947
Essendon	11.17 (83)	Fitzroy	10.14 (74)	Windy Hill	17,500	31 May 1947
Collingwood	10.13 (73)	Richmond	10.14 (74)	Victoria Park	27,500	31 May 1947
Carlton	13.21 (99)	North Melbourne	11.14 (80)	Princes Park	25,000	31 May 1947
South Melbourne	15.14 (104)	Hawthorn	12.20 (92)	Lake Oval	15,000	31 May 1947
Melbourne	17.3 (105)	Footscray	15.8 (98)	MCG	34,500	31 May 1947

=== Round 8 ===
Home team	Home team score	Away team	Away team score	Venue	Crowd	Date
Melbourne	15.15 (105)	St Kilda	5.13 (43)	MCG	11,000	7 June 1947
Hawthorn	10.15 (75)	North Melbourne	10.11 (71)	Glenferrie Oval	12,000	7 June 1947
Carlton	16.21 (117)	Geelong	7.10 (52)	Princes Park	16,000	7 June 1947
South Melbourne	15.9 (99)	Richmond	15.13 (103)	Lake Oval	24,000	7 June 1947
Footscray	12.11 (83)	Fitzroy	7.7 (49)	Western Oval	20,000	7 June 1947
Essendon	9.14 (68)	Collingwood	11.16 (82)	Windy Hill	22,000	7 June 1947

=== Round 9 ===
Home team	Home team score	Away team	Away team score	Venue	Crowd	Date
Fitzroy	16.15 (111)	Hawthorn	8.14 (62)	Brunswick Street Oval	13,000	14 June 1947
North Melbourne	9.6 (60)	Melbourne	11.15 (81)	Arden Street Oval	14,000	14 June 1947
Geelong	16.7 (103)	Footscray	11.20 (86)	Kardinia Park	14,500	14 June 1947
Richmond	7.14 (56)	Essendon	18.17 (125)	Punt Road Oval	34,000	14 June 1947
St Kilda	11.9 (75)	South Melbourne	18.13 (121)	Junction Oval	12,000	16 June 1947
Collingwood	16.16 (112)	Carlton	13.8 (86)	Victoria Park	43,500	16 June 1947

=== Round 10 ===
Home team	Home team score	Away team	Away team score	Venue	Crowd	Date
Melbourne	8.11 (59)	South Melbourne	9.15 (69)	MCG	28,000	21 June 1947
Footscray	4.17 (41)	Richmond	10.12 (72)	Western Oval	20,000	21 June 1947
North Melbourne	13.8 (86)	Geelong	18.11 (119)	Arden Street Oval	8,000	21 June 1947
Hawthorn	6.9 (45)	Essendon	18.20 (128)	Glenferrie Oval	14,000	21 June 1947
St Kilda	9.13 (67)	Collingwood	15.20 (110)	Junction Oval	11,000	21 June 1947
Fitzroy	8.7 (55)	Carlton	10.8 (68)	Brunswick Street Oval	29,000	21 June 1947

=== Round 11 ===
Home team	Home team score	Away team	Away team score	Venue	Crowd	Date
Richmond	23.15 (153)	St Kilda	7.10 (52)	Punt Road Oval	13,000	28 June 1947
Essendon	12.13 (85)	Melbourne	10.15 (75)	Windy Hill	21,000	28 June 1947
Collingwood	14.19 (103)	North Melbourne	9.15 (69)	Victoria Park	15,000	28 June 1947
Carlton	18.17 (125)	Hawthorn	8.14 (62)	Princes Park	14,000	28 June 1947
South Melbourne	15.9 (99)	Footscray	12.10 (82)	Lake Oval	25,000	28 June 1947
Geelong	10.10 (70)	Fitzroy	11.15 (81)	Kardinia Park	16,000	28 June 1947

=== Round 12 ===
Home team	Home team score	Away team	Away team score	Venue	Crowd	Date
North Melbourne	4.10 (34)	Richmond	12.11 (83)	Arden Street Oval	7,500	5 July 1947
Footscray	5.14 (44)	St Kilda	6.8 (44)	Western Oval	10,000	5 July 1947
Hawthorn	12.11 (83)	Geelong	16.21 (117)	Glenferrie Oval	5,500	5 July 1947
South Melbourne	8.14 (62)	Essendon	11.17 (83)	Lake Oval	18,000	5 July 1947
Fitzroy	9.11 (65)	Collingwood	7.6 (48)	Brunswick Street Oval	18,000	5 July 1947
Melbourne	9.10 (64)	Carlton	10.9 (69)	MCG	38,000	5 July 1947

=== Round 13 ===
Home team	Home team score	Away team	Away team score	Venue	Crowd	Date
Geelong	16.11 (107)	Melbourne	5.16 (46)	Kardinia Park	15,000	12 July 1947
Essendon	10.18 (78)	Footscray	8.11 (59)	Windy Hill	20,000	12 July 1947
Collingwood	8.17 (65)	Hawthorn	6.9 (45)	Victoria Park	12,000	12 July 1947
Carlton	10.14 (74)	South Melbourne	9.16 (70)	Princes Park	28,000	12 July 1947
St Kilda	8.15 (63)	North Melbourne	13.25 (103)	Junction Oval	6,000	12 July 1947
Richmond	12.12 (84)	Fitzroy	11.12 (78)	Punt Road Oval	28,000	12 July 1947

=== Round 14 ===
Home team	Home team score	Away team	Away team score	Venue	Crowd	Date
North Melbourne	8.14 (62)	South Melbourne	8.18 (66)	Arden Street Oval	8,000	19 July 1947
Footscray	13.18 (96)	Hawthorn	10.7 (67)	Western Oval	10,000	19 July 1947
Collingwood	12.11 (83)	Geelong	11.11 (77)	Victoria Park	15,000	19 July 1947
Carlton	10.10 (70)	Richmond	9.9 (63)	Princes Park	26,000	19 July 1947
Melbourne	7.10 (52)	Fitzroy	11.8 (74)	MCG	23,000	19 July 1947
St Kilda	7.13 (55)	Essendon	14.18 (102)	Junction Oval	7,000	19 July 1947

=== Round 15 ===
Home team	Home team score	Away team	Away team score	Venue	Crowd	Date
Melbourne	10.12 (72)	Richmond	11.15 (81)	MCG	32,000	26 July 1947
Hawthorn	16.18 (114)	St Kilda	10.9 (69)	Glenferrie Oval	5,000	26 July 1947
Fitzroy	16.7 (103)	North Melbourne	7.14 (56)	Brunswick Street Oval	11,000	26 July 1947
Essendon	16.21 (117)	Geelong	12.5 (77)	Windy Hill	16,000	26 July 1947
South Melbourne	9.15 (69)	Collingwood	9.15 (69)	Lake Oval	25,000	26 July 1947
Footscray	13.11 (89)	Carlton	14.9 (93)	Western Oval	25,000	26 July 1947

=== Round 16 ===
Home team	Home team score	Away team	Away team score	Venue	Crowd	Date
Carlton	7.12 (54)	Essendon	13.16 (94)	Princes Park	38,000	2 August 1947
Richmond	13.18 (96)	Hawthorn	8.7 (55)	Punt Road Oval	12,000	2 August 1947
St Kilda	9.9 (63)	Fitzroy	10.17 (77)	Junction Oval	8,000	2 August 1947
Geelong	13.19 (97)	South Melbourne	7.19 (61)	Kardinia Park	15,500	9 August 1947
Collingwood	7.14 (56)	Melbourne	7.19 (61)	Victoria Park	25,000	9 August 1947
North Melbourne	10.12 (72)	Footscray	11.10 (76)	Arden Street Oval	12,000	9 August 1947

=== Round 17 ===
Home team	Home team score	Away team	Away team score	Venue	Crowd	Date
Geelong	16.19 (115)	Richmond	13.9 (87)	Kardinia Park	18,500	16 August 1947
Essendon	19.12 (126)	North Melbourne	12.14 (86)	Windy Hill	13,000	16 August 1947
Collingwood	17.10 (112)	Footscray	12.12 (84)	Victoria Park	25,000	16 August 1947
Carlton	14.19 (103)	St Kilda	3.12 (30)	Princes Park	11,000	16 August 1947
Melbourne	13.21 (99)	Hawthorn	14.9 (93)	MCG	11,500	16 August 1947
South Melbourne	10.11 (71)	Fitzroy	12.10 (82)	Lake Oval	20,000	16 August 1947

=== Round 18 ===
Home team	Home team score	Away team	Away team score	Venue	Crowd	Date
Hawthorn	12.11 (83)	South Melbourne	19.14 (128)	Glenferrie Oval	8,000	23 August 1947
Footscray	11.14 (80)	Melbourne	24.11 (155)	Western Oval	11,000	23 August 1947
St Kilda	10.13 (73)	Geelong	15.17 (107)	Junction Oval	7,000	23 August 1947
Fitzroy	18.22 (130)	Essendon	8.14 (62)	Brunswick Street Oval	18,000	23 August 1947
Richmond	20.14 (134)	Collingwood	8.12 (60)	Punt Road Oval	31,000	23 August 1947
North Melbourne	10.12 (72)	Carlton	14.13 (97)	Arden Street Oval	12,000	23 August 1947

=== Round 19 ===
Home team	Home team score	Away team	Away team score	Venue	Crowd	Date
Richmond	16.17 (113)	South Melbourne	11.13 (79)	Punt Road Oval	22,000	30 August 1947
Fitzroy	20.18 (138)	Footscray	10.14 (74)	Brunswick Street Oval	13,000	30 August 1947
Collingwood	14.17 (101)	Essendon	16.12 (108)	Victoria Park	33,000	30 August 1947
St Kilda	10.18 (78)	Melbourne	27.9 (171)	Junction Oval	6,000	30 August 1947
North Melbourne	10.14 (74)	Hawthorn	10.10 (70)	Arden Street Oval	4,000	30 August 1947
Geelong	17.7 (109)	Carlton	16.11 (107)	Kardinia Park	21,500	30 August 1947

Round 19 is notable for Fred Fanning's 18-goal performance, which, to date, is the most goals ever scored by an individual player in VFL/AFL history for a single game. It was also his final game.

== Ladder ==
(P)	Premiers
	Qualified for finals

#	Team	P	W	L	D	PF	PA	%	Pts
1	Carlton (P)	19	15	4	0	1833	1368	134.0	60
2	Essendon	19	14	5	0	1876	1528	122.8	56
3	Fitzroy	19	13	6	0	1736	1370	126.7	52
4	Richmond	19	12	7	0	1726	1582	109.1	48
5	Collingwood	19	11	7	1	1738	1546	112.4	46
6	Melbourne	19	11	8	0	1742	1488	117.1	44
7	Geelong	19	11	8	0	1761	1705	103.3	44
8	South Melbourne	19	8	10	1	1602	1652	97.0	34
9	Footscray	19	8	10	1	1646	1713	96.1	34
10	North Melbourne	19	4	15	0	1390	1789	77.7	16
11	Hawthorn	19	4	15	0	1456	1907	76.4	16
12	St Kilda	19	1	17	1	1221	2079	58.7	6

Rules for classification: 1. premiership points; 2. percentage; 3. points for
Average score: 86.5
Source: AFL Tables

== Finals series ==
=== Semi-finals ===
Home team	Score	Away team	Score	Venue	Crowd	Date
Fitzroy	16.7 (103)	Richmond	11.9 (75)	MCG	82,570	6 September
Carlton	14.15 (99)	Essendon	11.17 (83)	MCG	75,475	13 September

=== Preliminary final ===
Home team	Score	Away team	Score	Venue	Crowd	Date
Essendon	16.13 (109)	Fitzroy	14.12 (96)	MCG	55,648	20 September

=== Grand final ===
Grand Final
Saturday, 27 September (2:15 pm)	Carlton	def.	Essendon	Melbourne Cricket Ground (crowd: 85,793)
4.0 (24); 8.0 (48); 10.4 (64); 13.8 (86)	Q1; Q2; Q3; Final	3.7 (25); 8.11 (59); 10.15 (75); 11.19 (85)	Umpires: Alfred Sawyer
Davies 4, Baird 3, Turner 2, Garby, Henfry, Howell, Stafford	Goals	Hutchison 4, Brittingham 2, Reynolds 2, Cassin, Goodingham, Rawle
Clark, Green, Turner, Henfry, Davies, Grieve, Jack Bennett, Conley	Best	Buttsworth, Jones, McClure, Hutchison, Reynolds, Lambert, Cassin, Harper, Allanson
Deacon (cramp), Bailey (knee)	Injuries
Reports	Cassin, for elbowing Hands in the third quarter

== Season notes ==
- In Round 2, South Melbourne returned to the Lake Oval for the first time since 1941 after it was vacated by the military and had its grandstand rebuilt; this was the final home ground change related to World War II.
- At the first bounce, at the very start of the round 5 match between Hawthorn and Richmond, Richmond ruckman Laurie Taylor punched the ball an amazing 40 yards and dislocated his shoulder.
- Richmond champion Jack Titus, having retired early in the 1946 VFA season, having scored 1159 goals in his senior career of 294 games with Richmond (1926–1943), 23 games with Coburg (1945–1946), and 14 games for Victoria (1929–1934, 1936), played one match for the Richmond Second Eighteen when it was short of players at the age of 39 and scored 12 goals against North Melbourne.
- In round 6, with North Melbourne trailing Essendon by 44 points at three quarter time, North Melbourne captain Les Foote moved into the ruck and almost single-handedly led a comeback which ended with an eight-point victory to North Melbourne: North Melbourne 15.12 (102) to Essendon 14.10 (94).
- A behind post at Kardinia Park falls over several times during the Geelong v Melbourne match in Round 13. A spectator holds the post up for the rest of the match.
- Western Australia defeated Victoria 16.10 (106) to 14.17 (101) at the Tenth ANFC Carnival in Tasmania. Also, in a challenge match, a combined South Australian and Western Australian team defeated the Victorian team 21.14 (140) to 19.15 (129).
- In the final round and his last league match before accepting a coaching job in the Western District, Melbourne's Fred Fanning kicked 18 goals 1 behind. This broke Gordon Coventry's Round 12, 1930 record for the most goals by one player in a VFL match, and still stands today.
- Carlton won the Grand Final by a point after Fred Stafford kicked a goal just before the final bell.

== Awards ==
- The 1947 VFL Premiership team was Carlton.
- The VFL's leading goalkicker was Fred Fanning of Melbourne with 97 goals.
- The winner of the 1947 Brownlow Medal was Bert Deacon of Carlton with 20 votes.
- St Kilda took the "wooden spoon" in 1947.
- The seconds premiership was won by North Melbourne. North Melbourne 16.13 (109) defeated Richmond 14.10 (94) in the Grand Final, played as a curtain-raiser to the senior Grand Final on Saturday 27 September at the Melbourne Cricket Ground.
- The thirds premiership was won by Melbourne (main: 1947 VFL thirds season)

== Sources ==
- 1947 VFL season at AFL Tables
- 1947 VFL season at Australian Football
