= 1947 VFL grand final =

Grand final of the 1947 Victorian Football League season

1947 VFL Grand Final

Essendon	Carlton
11.19 (85)	13.8 (86)
	1	2	3	4
ESS	3.7 (25)	8.11 (59)	10.15 (75)	11.19 (85)
CAR	4.0 (24)	8.0 (48)	10.4 (64)	13.8 (86)
- Date: 27 September 1947
- Stadium: Melbourne Cricket Ground
- Attendance: 85,793

The 1947 VFL grand final was an Australian rules football match contested between the Carlton Football Club and Essendon Football Club, held at the Melbourne Cricket Ground on 27 September 1947. It was the 49th annual grand final of the Victorian Football League, staged to determine the premiers for the 1947 VFL season. The match, attended by 85,793 spectators, was won by Carlton by one point, marking that club's eighth VFL premiership. The winning goal was kicked by Fred Stafford in the dying seconds of the match to give Carlton the win.

== Grand final ==
=== Lead-up ===
Carlton, who were winners of the 1945 premiership but finished sixth in 1946, had been the best performing club in 1947; the club finished as minor premiers with a record of 15–4, and had led the ladder continuously since Round 5. Essendon, who had won the 1946 premiership, had begun the season with a middling 4–4 record to sit sixth after eight rounds, before winning ten of its last eleven games, including a nine-game run, to finish second with a record of 14–5. The two clubs faced each other twice during the home-and-away season, each winning once: Carlton 14.7 (91) d. Essendon 8.16 (64) in round 5 at Essendon, and Essendon 13.16 (94) d. Carlton 7.12 (54) in round 16 at Carlton.

The teams met in the second semi-final, and after Essendon took a 25-point quarter time lead, Carlton fought back and ultimately won the game 14.15 (99) d. 11.17 (83) to qualify for the grand final. Essendon then faced Fitzroy in the preliminary final, and won 16.13 (109) d. 14.12 (96) to qualify.

Carlton made one change to its second semi-final team: Jim Mooring was out with a broken finger, Ken Hands was elevated from reserve to the starting eighteen, and Ken Baxter – the club's leading goalkicker for the season – returned as reserve for his first game since injury in round 14; defenders Bert Deacon – winner of the 1947 Brownlow Medal – and Ollie Grieve were both under injury clouds and did not train, having suffered leg injuries in the second semi-final, but both were ultimately cleared to play. Essendon made one change to its run-on team from the preliminary final: Gordon Lane was out with broken ribs, and was replaced by veteran Jack Cassin; Cassin had been serving as captain-coach of the seconds during the year and had not played a senior game since 1946, and the 1947 grand final was ultimately the last VFL game of his career. Essendon also made one change to its reserves: Wally May was omitted and replaced with Ken Newton.

The match was played in hot but breezy conditions, with a cross-wind slightly favouring the Punt Road end of the ground. The seconds grand final was played as a curtain raiser, in which North Melbourne 16.13 (109) defeated Richmond 14.10 (94).

=== First quarter ===
Essendon won the toss and kicked with the breeze in the first quarter. Essendon attacked first, but Carlton was the first to score, Herb Turner kicking the opening goal from a crumbing effort in front of goal. Essendon attacked next, but missed on consecutive shots by Bill Brittingham and Dick Reynolds twice, before Carlton kicked the next two goals – a long drop-kicked set shot by Jack Howell and a shorter set shot by Jim Baird – to take 15 point lead. Essendon finally kicked its first goal when Reynolds crumbed off the back of a marking contest. Brittingham soon had two more chances from set shots, but missed both again, before Bill Hutchison narrowed the margin to one point with a wide-angled shot on the run. Baird scored his second goal from a snap shot for Carlton soon after to restore a seven point buffer. Two more behinds followed for Essendon, including a missed set shot from 12 yards directly in front by Brittingham, before Essendon took its first lead when Jack Cassin goaled from a free kick. Essendon continued to attack, but were repelled by the Carlton defense. When the quarter ended, Essendon held a one point lead, 3.7 (25) led 4.0 (24).

Although Essendon had scored ten times to Carlton's four with the aid of the breeze, they had been wasteful in front of goal – especially Brittingham, who had scored 0.4. Neither side had marked the ball cleanly. Carlton had the better of the ruck contests early in the quarter, Howell and Jack Bennett getting the better of Perc Bushby and Cassin, and Essendon moved Jack Jones into the ruck midway through the quarter to seek an advantage. Essendon captain-coach Reynolds later lamented his side's overuse of short passing in the forward line during the quarter while it held the advantage.

=== Second quarter ===
Essendon scored the first goal of the second quarter, Hutchison kicking his second goal on the run, before Carlton began to attack with the wind. Several attacks were repelled, but Carlton kicked the next two goals of the game to take a five point lead: Jim Baird kicking his third, and Herb Turner his second. Essendon then began to control the play, and over the next period of the game kicked 2.3 (15) to Carlton's no score, missing several shots but with goals to Reynolds and Brittingham, to take a ten point lead.

The teams then traded goals for the remainder of the quarter. Carlton kicked the next goal, Fred Davies converting a free kick right in front; and squandered another soon after when Jack Conley kicked into the man on the mark from another free kick. Essendon responded, getting the ball over the Carlton defenders to allow Brittingham to kick his second from the goal square. Davies kicked his second from a broken contest in the Carlton goal square, and Essendon closed the quarter's scoring with a goal to Ivan Goodingham. At half time, Essendon held an 11-point advantage, 8.11 (59) led 8.0 (48).

Although Carlton was not being outplayed by numbers, the quality of its play was poor: in particular, Carlton's players had been bunching up rather than keeping their positions; and, overuse of short passing had halted many Carlton attacks, with Essendon centre half-back Wally Buttsworth particularly strong at intercepting. During the quarter, Carlton moved Baird move to centre half forward and Ken Hands to full forward, looking to use Baird's speed to tire Buttsworth out. Ultimately, it was the difference in goalkicking accuracy, as well as strong play by the Carlton defenders in repelling the Essendon attacks, which had kept the game close.

=== Third quarter ===
The third quarter opened in an arm wrestle, the game mostly played between the two half-back lines; Buttsworth proved impenetrable for Essendon and the Carlton defenders similarly effective at the other end. Essendon began to make the play, but were still unable to manage a goal, and after much of the quarter had elapsed, seven behinds had been scored – three by Carlton and four by Essendon. It was not until Davies kicked his third goal for Carlton from a brilliant pack mark that the first goal was scored for the quarter, narrowing the margin to 6 points. The teams again traded goals for the rest of the quarter: Hutchison kicked his third goal for Essendon from a handball receive; Ern Henfry kicked a goal for Carlton from a 40yd set shot; and Hutchison kicked his fourth goal after his opponent Bert Deacon fumbled. There was no more scoring, but the quarter ended with a nasty incident in which Howell dropped behind play, and Carlton's Vin Brown was accidentally knocked unconscious by a team-mate in the ensuing melee. Both teams kicked 2.4 for the quarter, and Essendon led 10.15 (75) to 10.4 (64) at three-quarter time.

Essendon had continued to dominated through wings and Buttsworth at half back, while Carlton's own defenders had saved the Blues' position. Deacon, hobbled by persistent cramping, had increasingly become a liability against Hutchison, and he was replaced at centre half-back by reserve Ken Baxter at three-quarter time.

=== Final quarter ===
Carlton made the first attacks in the final quarter without scoring, before Essendon scored the first two behinds of the quarter, by George Hassell and Brittingham. Carlton then kicked the first goal, Ray Garby converting after receiving a pass from Baird to narrow the margin to seven points. After one more behind each, Essendon extended its lead when Keith Rawle capitalised on a Carlton error in defence, and after 14 minutes of play, the Bombers led by 13 points.

Carlton then took control of the game, and dominated the final ten minutes of the game, such that the ball barely left Carlton's half of the ground. Conley and Hands each missed set shots for Carlton, before Davies kicked his fourth goal after a pass from Henfry to reduce the margin to six points. Soon after, Carlton thought it had equalised: from a mark near the boundary on the half-forward flank, Hands played on, fumbling as he ran around the boundary, and passed to Garby who ran into an open goal; but the play was called all the way back to the half-forward flank when the boundary umpire ruled that Hands had carried the ball out of bounds. Further attacks, including five separate forays to the goal face from shots which fell short, were repelled, before Davies marked and missed a 20yd set shot, reducing the margin to five points. Then, less than 40 seconds before the final bell from a boundary throw-in alongside the Carlton behind post, Baxter rucked the ball to first year player Fred Stafford, who snapped a goal on his non-preferred foot to put Carlton one point ahead. Essendon went forward from the ensuing centre bounce, but the bell sounded before they had a scoring chance and Carlton won by one point, 13.8 (86) d. 11.19 (85).

=== Review ===
General consensus was that Essendon's Wally Buttsworth was the best player on the ground, with sportswriters Percy Beames of the Age, Alf Brown of the Herald, and Essendon captain-coach Dick Reynolds in his column for the Argus all reporting as such. Buttsworth was a dominant force at centre half-back in repelling Carlton's attacks and intercepting its short-passing game; such was his dominance that he took 25 marks for the game out of Essendon's total of 68. Other players singled out for praise for their efforts throughout the game were: Essendon rover Bill Hutchison, whom Hec de Lacy of the Sporting Globe considered the best on ground, for his excellent work around the ground and who never tired towards the end; Carlton defender Jim Clark, who was the strongest of the Carlton defenders and consistently rebounded with great dash.

Essendon's inaccurate goalkicking proved to be one of the key elements of its downfall, losing despite recording nine more scoring shots than Carlton. Bill Brittingham, the 1946 league leading goalkicker, was particularly guilty, returning 2.6 (18) from his shots for the game. It was the first of two consecutive seasons in which the Bombers were left to lament their poor kicking in the Grand Final, drawing the 1948 Grand Final against Melbourne 7.27 (69) drew 10.9 (69), before losing in a replay.

Post-game analysis also focussed heavily on Carlton's dominance in latter part of the final quarter; Essendon's last score of the game came almost twenty minutes before the final bell, and it was noted that had the Blues taken full advantage of its many chances during that period that the final margin would have been much greater. Carlton coach Percy Bentley commented that it had been a deliberate tactic to play a fast running game, with short passing and play-on tactics, to attempt to fatigue the Essendon players who were not coming off a bye week, and in particular the Blues were able to capitalise on Buttsworth's fatigue in those final minutes. Several Carlton players were singled out for their brilliance during those final minutes, including Ern Henfry through the midfield, ruckman Jack Bennett who frequently intercepted and returned the Essendon rebounds, and several flashy efforts from forward Ken Hands. Hec de Lacy also considered that Dick Reynolds made a tactical error by taking himself to the backline to support his teammates during those final ten minutes, as it allowed his fresher direct opponent Ken Baxter – on the ground only since three-quarter time – to follow him and tip the scales further in Carlton's advantage; Baxter took many ruck contests during this period, and was ultimately the one who tapped the ball to Stafford for the winning goal.

The match was the second VFL Grand Final to be decided by one point, the previous being the 1899 final. Carlton captain Ern Henfry, who was in his first full season with the club after playing two games in 1944 on a wartime permit, became the only player to captain a premiership in his first full season of VFL football.

=== Scorecard ===
Grand Final
Saturday, 27 September (2:15 pm)	Carlton	def.	Essendon	Melbourne Cricket Ground (crowd: 85,793)
4.0 (24); 8.0 (48); 10.4 (64); 13.8 (86)	Q1; Q2; Q3; Final	3.7 (25); 8.11 (59); 10.15 (75); 11.19 (85)	Umpires: Alfred Sawyer
Davies 4, Baird 3, Turner 2, Garby, Henfry, Howell, Stafford	Goals	Hutchison 4, Brittingham 2, Reynolds 2, Cassin, Goodingham, Rawle
Clark, Green, Turner, Henfry, Davies, Grieve, Jack Bennett, Conley	Best	Buttsworth, Jones, McClure, Hutchison, Reynolds, Lambert, Cassin, Harper, Allanson
Deacon (cramp), Bailey (knee)	Injuries
Reports	Cassin, for elbowing Hands in the third quarter

== Teams ==
Carlton	Essendon

Carlton
B:	Ritchie Green	Ollie Grieve	George Bailey
HB:	Vin Brown	Bert Deacon	Jim Clark
C:	Fred Fitzgibbon	Ern Henfry (c)	Doug Williams
HF:	Fred Stafford	Ken Hands	Ray Garby
F:	Fred Davies	Jim Baird	Herb Turner
Foll:	Jack Howell	Jack Bennett	Jack Conley
Res:	Ken Baxter	Allan Greenshields	
Coach:	Percy Bentley		

Essendon
B:	Les Gardiner	Cec Ruddell	Bob McClure
HB:	Noel Allanson	Wally Buttsworth	Norm McDonald
C:	Bob Bradley	Harold Lambert	George Hassell
HF:	Dick Reynolds (c)	Jack Jones	Albert Harper
F:	Ivan Goodingham	Bill Brittingham	Keith Rawle
Foll:	Perc Bushby	Jack Cassin	Bill Hutchison
Res:	Ken Newton	Greg Tate	
Coach:	Dick Reynolds		

== See also ==
- 1947 VFL season
