= List of Carlton Football Club leading goalkickers =

The following is a list of Carlton Football Club leading goalkickers in each season of the Australian Football League (formerly the Victorian Football League) and AFL Women's.

== VFL/AFL ==
The following players finished as the leading goalkicker in the respective VFL/AFL season:

^	Denotes current player
+	Player won Coleman Medal in same season

Season	Player(s)	Goals
1897	Wally O'Cock	15
1898	Tommy O'Day	8
1899	Harry Thompson	8
1900	Joe Sullivan	18
1901	Joe Sullivan (2)	14
1902	Fred Webber	11
1903	Joe Sullivan (3)	27
1904	Mick Grace	26
1905	Frank Caine	25
1906	Mick Grace (2)	50
1907	Frank Caine (2)	32
1908	Vin Gardiner	34
1909	George Topping	36
1910	Vin Gardiner (2)	42
1911	Vin Gardiner (3)	47
1912	Vin Gardiner (4)	47
1913	Vin Gardiner (5)	27
1914	Bill Cook	27
1915	Herb Burleigh	46
1916	Vin Gardiner (6)	44
1917	Billy Dick	22
1918	Ern Cowley	35
1919	Charlie Fisher	36
1920	Horrie Clover	48
1921	Horrie Clover (2)	58
1922	Horrie Clover (3)	56
1923	Horrie Clover (4)	28
1924	Alex Duncan	27
1925	Harvey Dunn, Sr.	35
1926	Horrie Clover (5)	38
1927	Harold Carter	33
1928	Horrie Clover (6)	41
1929	Harry Vallence	64
1930	Les Allen	56
1931	Harry Vallence (2)	86
1932	Harry Vallence (3)	97
1933	Harry Vallence (4)	84
1934	Mickey Crisp	44
1935	Harry Vallence (5)	66
1936	Harry Vallence (6)	86
1937	Harry Vallence (7)	39
1938	Harry Vallence (8)	81
1939	Ken Baxter	65
1940	Paul Schmidt	55
1941	Paul Schmidt (2)	77
1942	Paul Schmidt (3)	47
1943	Jack Wrout	33
1944	Jim Mooring	42
1945	Lance Collins	49
1946	Ken Baxter (2)	46
1947	Ken Baxter (3)	42
1948	Ken Baxter (4)	39
1948	Ray Garby	39
1949	Ken Baxter (5)	46
1950	Ken Baxter (6)	43
1951	Keith Warburton	48
1952	Jack Howell	42
1953	John Spencer	32
1954	Noel O'Brien	45
1955	Noel O'Brien (2)	73
1956	Kevan Hamilton	22
1957	Gerald Burke	34
1958	John Heathcote	19
1959	Sergio Silvagni	40
1960	Leo Brereton	44
1961	Tom Carroll	54
1962	Tom Carroll (2)	62
1963	Tom Carroll (3)	27
1964	Ian Nankervis	18
1965	Bryan Quirk	29
1966	Adrian Gallagher	24
1967	Brian Kekovich	38
1968	Brian Kekovich (2)	59
1969	Alex Jesaulenko	66
1970	Alex Jesaulenko (2)	115
1971	Alex Jesaulenko (3)	56
1972	Greg Kennedy	76
1973	Brian Walsh	60
1974	Craig Davis	45
1975	Robert Walls	59
1976	Robert Walls (2)	55
1977	Mark Maclure	39
1978	Rod Galt	49
1979	Ken Sheldon	53
1980	Wayne Johnston	51
1981	Peter Bosustow	59
1982	Ross Ditchburn	61
1983	Ken Hunter	43
1984	Warren Ralph	55
1985	Mark Maclure (2)	48
1986	Stephen Kernahan	62
1987	Stephen Kernahan (2)	73
1988	Stephen Kernahan (3)	54
1989	Stephen Kernahan (4)	59
1990	Stephen Kernahan (5)	69
1991	Stephen Kernahan (6)	46
1992	Stephen Kernahan (7)	83
1993	Stephen Kernahan (8)	68
1994	Stephen Kernahan (9)	82
1995	Stephen Kernahan (10)	63
1996	Stephen Kernahan (11)	56
1997	Anthony Koutoufides	28
1998	Lance Whitnall	46
1999	Lance Whitnall (2)	55
2000	Lance Whitnall (3)	70
2001	Matthew Lappin	49
2002	Corey McKernan	40
2003	Brendan Fevola	63
2004	Brendan Fevola (2)	66
2005	Brendan Fevola (3)	49
2006	Brendan Fevola (4)	84
2007	Brendan Fevola (5)	59
2008	Brendan Fevola (6)	99
2009	Brendan Fevola (7)	89
2010	Eddie Betts	42
2011	Andrew Walker	56
2012	Eddie Betts (2)	48
2013	Jeff Garlett	43
2014	Jarrad Waite	29
2015	Andrejs Everitt	31
2016	Matthew Wright	22
2017	Levi Casboult	34
2018	Charlie Curnow	34
2019	Harry McKay	26
2020	Harry McKay (2)	21
2021	Harry McKay (3)	58
2022	Charlie Curnow (2)	64
2023	Charlie Curnow (3)	81
2024	Charlie Curnow (4)	57
2025	Charlie Curnow (5)	32
2026	Brodie Kemp	39

=== Multiple leading goalkickers (minimum five wins) ===
Player	Wins	Seasons
Stephen Kernahan	11	1986, 1987, 1988, 1989, 1990, 1991, 1992, 1993, 1994, 1995, 1996
Harry Vallence	8	1929, 1931, 1932, 1933, 1935, 1936, 1937, 1938
Brendan Fevola	7	2003, 2004, 2005, 2006, 2007, 2008, 2009
Ken Baxter	6	1939, 1946, 1947, 1948, 1949, 1950
Horrie Clover	6	1920, 1921, 1922, 1923, 1926, 1928
Vin Gardiner	6	1908, 1910, 1911, 1912, 1913, 1916
Charlie Curnow	5	2018, 2022, 2023, 2024, 2025

=== Leading career goalkickers ===
Player	Goals	Average
Stephen Kernahan	738	2.94
Harry Vallence	722	3.54
Brendan Fevola	575	3.07
Alex Jesaulenko	424	1.66
Horrie Clover	396	2.96
Rod Ashman	370	1.57
Robert Walls	367	1.68
Ken Baxter	365	2.39
Lance Whitnall	348	1.61
Vin Gardiner	341	2.17

=== Most goals in a game ===
Goals	Player	Opponent	Round	Year	Venue
13.0	Horrie Clover	St Kilda	12	1921	Junction Oval
12.3	Greg Kennedy	Hawthorn	21	1972	Princes Park
12.2	Ross Ditchburn	St Kilda	16	1982	Waverley Park
11.0	Paul Schmidt	St Kilda	16	1941	Princes Park
11.0	Harry Vallence	Fitzroy	15	1938	Brunswick Street Oval
11.0	Harry Vallence	Collingwood	Preliminary Final	1932	MCG
11.0	Harry Vallence	Collingwood	Semi Final	1931	MCG
11.0	Harry Vallence	South Melbourne	15	1929	Princes Park
10.7	Stephen Kernahan	Footscray	3	1995	MCG
10.6	Stephen Silvagni	Fitzroy	16	1993	Princes Park

== AFL Women's ==
The following players finished as the leading goalkicker in the respective AFL Women's season:

^	Denotes current player
+	Player won AFL Women's leading goalkicker award in same season

Season	Leading goalkicker	Goals	Ref.
2017	Darcy Vescio	14	
2018	Tayla Harris	5	
2018	Darcy Vescio (2)	5	
2019	Tayla Harris (2)	8	
2020	Tayla Harris (3)	8	
2020	Georgia Gee	8	
2021	Darcy Vescio (3)	16	
2022 (S6)	Courtney Jones	8	
2022 (S7)	Breann Harrington	6	
2023	Mia Austin	11	
2024	Mia Austin (2)	5	
2024	Breann Harrington (2)	5	
2024	Keeley Skepper	5	
2025	Sophie McKay	18	
