= Jack Cassin =

Australian rules footballer (1915–1994)

Personal information
- Full name: John William Cassin
- Born: 1 July 1915; Richmond, Victoria
- Died: 3 September 1994 (aged 79); Colac, Victoria
- Original team: Seville
- Height: 183 cm (6 ft 0 in)
- Weight: 82 kg (181 lb)

Playing career^{1}
| Years | Club | Games (Goals) |
| 1935 | Seville (YVFA) | |
| 1936–1944 | Essendon (VFL) | 129 (116) |
| 1946–1947 | Essendon (VFL) | 21 (29) |
| 1948 | Euroa (WNEFL) | |
| 1949–1951 | Colac (HFL) | |

Representative team honours
| Years | Team | Games (Goals) |
| 1941 | Victoria | 1 |

Coaching career
| Years | Club | Games (W–L–D) |
| 1948 | Euroa (WNEFL) | |
| 1949–1951 | Colac (HFL) | |
- ^{1} Playing statistics correct to the end of 1951.

Career highlights
- VFL premiership 1942, 1946; HFL premiership 1950; Essendon Semi-Final Team: 1940, 1941, 1943, 1944; Essendon Preliminary Final Team: 1940, 1941, 1942, 1944, 1946 (drawn), 1946; Essendon Grand Final Team: 1941, 1942, 1943, 1946, 1947; VFL Inter-State Representative Team: 1941.; Life member Essendon Football Club: 1946.; Euroa Grand Final Team: 1948; Colac Grand Final Team: 1949, 1950

John William Cassin (1 July 1915 – 3 September 1994) was an Australian rules footballer who played for Essendon in the Victorian Football League (VFL) over eleven seasons in twelve years, and served as the captain coach of the Euroa Football Club in 1948, and of the Colac Football Club from 1949 to 1951. He served with the RAAF in World War II.

== Family ==
The son of William John Cassin (1885–1928), and Margaret Evelyn Cassin (1887–1929), née Priestly, John William Cassin was born at Richmond, Victoria on 1 July 1915.

He married Edna May Falcke (1915–1971) in 1941. One of their seven children, John, played for Essendon (1971–1974), North Melbourne (1977–1981), and Fitzroy (1981–1982) in the VFL, and West Torrens (1975–1976) in the SANFL.

== Football ==
External videos
- The Cassins of Colac, BomberTV, 16 May 2018.
- Overview of the History of Colac FNC, colactigers.com.au.

"A rugged and tenacious utility who played the game hard and not always fair, Jack Cassin was a noteworthy identity for many years at Essendon … A controversial figure at times, Cassin was a renowned "stirrer" of opposition players, and might be said to have played his football according to the adage "hit first and ask questions later". Not surprisingly, this approach sometimes attracted the ire of opposition supporters — on one occasion he was actually attacked on the field by an angry fan — and he was no stranger to the Tribunal either, making a total of eight visits there during his career, and being found guilty three times." — John Devaney, Australian Football.
"Cassin … [a] big, fast man … is a remarkable player. As well as doing a great job in the ruck, he gives team mates plenty of leads and pops up all over the place as a loose man." — Dick Reynolds, Essendon coach, 16 July 1946.

=== Seville (YVFA) ===
Cassin was recruited to Essendon from the Seville Football Club in the Yarra Valley Football Association, where he had won the team's trophy for "the most improved player" in the 1935 season.

=== Essendon (VFL) ===
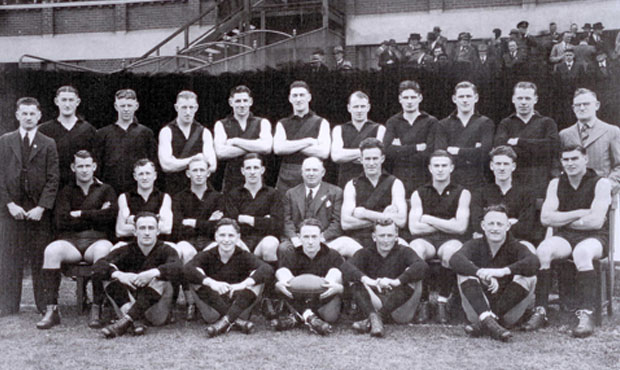
Essendon's 1942 Grand Final team (Cassin is fourth player from the right in back row).

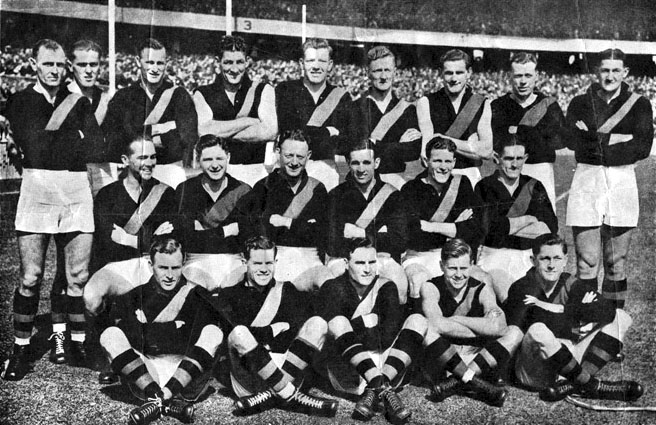
Essendon's 1946 Grand Final team (Cassin is at the extreme left of back row).

Although he was residentially tied to Richmond, Richmond had expressed no interest in him. Also, some Fitzroy officials had gone to see him play the week before he was signed by Essendon (by former Essendon player and Committeeman Harry Gregory), and had left the match without even speaking to him.

One of Essendon Second XVIII's best players in the opening round of the 1936 season (scoring 4 goals), in its match against North Melbourne, he made his senior debut, at centre half-forward (opposed to Carlton's centre half-back Gordon Mackie), against Carlton at Princes Park on the following Saturday, 9 May 1936, when Carlton thrashed Essendon 21.19 (145) to 5.13 (43), with Harry "Soapy" Vallence kicking 9 goals in what remains (as of April 2022) as Carlton's greatest ever winning margin against Essendon.

Over his eleven seasons at Essendon, Cassin was mainly used in the first ruck, resting either in the forward-pocket or on the half-forward flank, combining well with Hugh Torney over Torney's last eight seasons (1936–1943) with Essendon, and his hard and tenacious style of play meant that he was a controversial figure during his career, often having to visit the tribunal and, even once, was attacked on the field by an angry opposition supporter.

=== 6 July 1946 ===
On 6 July 1946, Essendon defeated Carlton, 12.12 (84) to 9.9 (63), at Windy Hill.

WANTED TO FIGHT BUT SHOOK HANDS
In the second quarter of the Essendon-Carlton match a man in a brown suit ran from the grandstand reserve to the centre, and attempted to hit [Essendon's first-ruck Jack] Cassin, who was standing (Carlton's centreman Ray) Garby's mark.
Cassin grabbed the intruder by his waistcoat. The man slipped, got up, shook hands with (Carlton's half-back flanker Vin) Brown, and ran off again.
Police constables moved towards the man, but made no attempt to arrest him. — The Sporting Globe, 6 July 1946.

=== Essendon Reserves ===
He retired from senior football at the end of the 1946 season; and, having withdrawn his application to coach the Hawthorn First XVIII, spent the entire 1947 season as captain-coach of the Essendon Reserves.

=== 1947 VFL Grand Final ===
In September 1947, due to the extensive injuries of those on Essendon's senior list, Cassin was recalled to the senior team to play in the 1947 VFL Grand Final although he had not played a senior match in 1947; he was in good form, however, having been one of the best players in the Second's losing Preliminary Final team on the preceding Saturday. He replaced Gordon Lane, who had suffered leg and rib injuries in the preceding week's Preliminary Final.

Playing in the first-ruck with Perc Bushby, Cassin, who scored a goal, was one of Essendon's best players in a team that, despite having 30 scoring shots to Carlton's 21, lost by a single point 11.19 (85) to 13.8 (86), with Carlton's half-forward flanker, Fred Stafford, scoring a left-foot goal in the last few moments of the match.

=== Euroa (WNEFL) ===
In 1948, he was appointed captain-coach of the Euroa Football Club in the Waranga-North-Eastern Football League.

Euroa lost the 1948 WNEFL Grand-Final match against Seymour, at Avenel on 4 September 1948, by two points: 9.6 (60) to 7.20 (62).

=== Colac (HFL) ===
In 1949 he was appointed as the captain-coach of the Colac Football Club team, which had been founded in late 1948 specifically to compete in the Hampden Football League in the 1949 season. He coached the team for its first three seasons: 1949, 1950, and 1951.

- In 1949, although Colac were the competition's minor premiers, it lost the Grand Final to Cobden, coached by ex-Collingwood player Jack Murphy, 7.11 to 11.13.
- In 1950, having finished third in the home-and-away season, a more accurate (i.e., seven fewer scoring shots) Colac defeated Warrnambool, coached by ex-South Melbourne player Don Grossman, in the Grand Final by three points: 12.8 (80), to 10.17 (77).
- In 1951, Colac was unexpectedly relegated (on percentage) to fifth on the competition's ladder, due to a large (seven goal) win by Warrnambool over Cobden in the last home-and-way match of the 1951 season. Cassin confirmed his retirement after Colac's final match for the 1951 season, against Terang on 11 August 1951.

=== After football ===
Having retired at the end of the 1951 season, he was succeeded as captain-coach by the ex-Footscray player George "Binga" McLaren. Cassin remained in Colac for the rest of his life.

== VFL Tribunal ==
- 1938: Two Essendon players were reported after the 30 July 1938 match, against Carlton, at Princes Park: Essendon's wingman, Frank Kelly, was reported for kicking Carlton's half-back flanker Charlie McInnes in the third quarter, and Essendon's back-pocket, Bob Standfield, was reported for kicking Carlton's full-back Frank Gill, also in the third quarter of the match.
  - In relation to the charge against Kelly, at the Tribunal hearing on 2 August 1938, "because the evidence against Kelly was not conclusive, the tribunal decided to give [Kelly] the benefit of the doubt, and dismissed the case".
  - In relation to the charge against Standfield, evidence supporting Standfield's complete innocence — on the grounds that, given the evidence of the Essendon coach, Jack Baggott, that, having been selected as a resting back-pocket ruckman, Standfield had not moved from the back-pocket until the last quarter the game; and, therefore, could not have been in the forward line in the third quarter — was presented at the Tribunal hearing on 2 August 1938.
    In response to specific and direct questioning from the Tribunal — having declared that it was more than satisfied that Gill had, indeed, been kicked — and in relation to the alleged "mistaken identity" of Standfield (who wore number 6), the Essendon delegate, Bill Brew, stated that, although he had not been able to conclusively identify who the Essendon player was involved, he "believed" that the player could have been either Cassin (who wore number 19) or Tom Reynolds (who wore number 29).
    Having stated (in support of his claim of "mistaken identity") that Stanfield had "played in the back-pocket for the first three quarters", and in response to the Tribunal's subsequent question, "Are you sure of the placings of the players?", Brew replied that, "Cassin and Tom Reynolds were the change ruckmen [and] Stanfield was [being] kept as a fresh follower for the last quarter."
    The Tribunal then suspended its hearing, and noting that "the charge was particularly serious, and musty be investigated thoroughly", adjourned its consideration to the following week in order to "enable Standfield to bring more positive evidence".
    On 9 August 1938, although fully satisfied that Gill had been kicked, and given that it had unreservedly accepted that Standfield had not moved from the back-pocket, and given the failure of Essendon to produce the culprit responsible, it had no alternative but to dismiss the charge against Standfield. No official or unofficial action was ever taken against either Cassin or Reynolds; and Cassin, at the time, emphatically denied the implication that he had anything to do with the Gill incident.
- 1940: Two Essendon players were reported after the 18 May 1940 match, against Fitzroy, at the Brunswick Street Oval: Essendon's half-forward flanker, Bob Standfield, was reported for attempting to strike Fitzroy's half-back flanker Arthur Hall in the second quarter, and Essendon's first-ruck, Jack Cassin, was reported for attempting to strike Fitzroy's half-back flanker Alan Fields in the third quarter of the match.
  - At its hearing on 21 May 1940, the Tribunal declared that, in both cases, "the evidence [was] not strong enough to sustain the charge[s]".
- 1940: Essendon's first-ruck Cassin was reported after the 13 July 1940 match, against Melbourne, at the MCG for "unseemly conduct" and for "allegedly punching the ball away after (Melbourne's first-ruck Jack) Meuller had marked in the third quarter".
  - At its hearing on 16 July 1940, the Tribunal found that the charge against Cassin was "sustained"; but it "felt that a reprimand would meet the case, taking into consideration Cassin's clean record".
- 1940: Two Essendon players were reported after the 21 September 1940 Preliminary Final, against Melbourne, at the MCG.
  During a fiery and violent second quarter, triggered by an incident wherein Essendon's resting back-pocket ruckman, Fred Green, crashed to the ground, in which, it seemed (at least to the Essendon players), that he had been kicked by one of the Melbourne players: "The crowd in the vicinity was immediately in an uproar, and Essendon players seemed incensed. From then until toward the end of the quarter much wild play was seen. There were heavy charges, more than one blow was struck, and two players were seen struggling on the ground."
  Essendon's centre half-back Buttsworth was reported for striking the Melbourne rover, Percy Beames, who had replaced Ron Barassi senior in the selected side, in the second quarter, and Essendon's first-ruck, Jack Cassin reported for striking the Melbourne centre half-back, Gordon Jones, also in the second quarter of the match.
  - At its hearing on 1 October 1940, the Tribunal determined that the charges against both of the Essendon players "were not sustained".
- 1941: Essendon's half-forward flanker, Jack Cassin, was reported after the 10 May 1941 match, against St Kilda, at the Junction Oval for striking the St Kilda wingman, Jack Kelly, in the third quarter of the match.
  - At its hearing on 16 May 1941, the Tribunal determined that the charges against Cassin were sustained, and he was suspended for four matches.
- 1942: South Melbourne's captain and centreman, Herbie Matthews, was reported after the 12 September 1942 Preliminary Final match, against Essendon, at Princes Park for "misconduct" in attempting to strike Essendon's first-ruck, Jack Cassin, in the last quarter of the match.
  - At its hearing on 4 November 1942, the Tribunal determined that the charges against Matthews were not sustained.
- 1942: Richmond's full-back, George Smeaton, was reported after the 19 September 1942 Grand Final match, against Essendon, at Princes Park for charging Essendon's first-ruck, Jack Cassin, in the third quarter of the match.
  - At its much-delayed hearing on 20 December 1942, the Tribunal determined that the charges against Smeaton were sustained, and he was suspended for four matches.
- 1944: Two Carlton players and two Essendon players were reported after the 27 May 1944 match, against Carlton, at Princes Park: Carlton's back-pocket, Rod McLean, was charged with having "hacked" Essendon's rover, Murray Dimble, and Dimble was charged with striking McLean; and Carlton's centre half-back, Frank Anderson, and Essendon's first-ruck, Jack Cassin, were charged with striking each other.
  - At its hearing on 30 May 1944, the Tribunal dismissed the charges against Anderson and Cassin; and, at its (adjourned from 30 May 1944) hearing on 2 June 1944, the Tribunal dismissed the charges against McLean and Dimble.
- 1946: Two Essendon players were reported after the 13 July 1946 match, against Footscray, at Windy Hill: Essendon's centre half-back Buttsworth was reported for striking the Footscray wingman, Dick Wearmouth, and Essendon's first-ruck, Jack Cassin reported for striking Footscray's first-ruck, Arthur Olliver, during "what was one of the roughest games of the season".
  - At its hearing on 16 July 1946, the Tribunal dismissed the charges against both players.
- 1947: Essendon's first-ruck Cassin was reported after the 27 September 1947 Grand Final match, against Carlton, at the MCG for "excessively contacting" Carlton's centre half-forward, Ken Hands, "with bent elbow and shoulder when the ball had passed" in the third quarter of the match.
  - At its hearing on 14 October 1947, the Tribunal found that the charge against Cassin was "sustained"; however, on the grounds that "it was not [thought to be] a serious offence, the tribunal considered [that] a severe reprimand was sufficient punishment".

== Career ==
His football record is impressive:

- 1935: Seville Football Club.
- 1936: Essendon Football Club, 8 senior games.
- 1937: Essendon Football Club, 14 senior games.
- 1938: Essendon Football Club, 12 senior games.
- 1939: Essendon Football Club, 17 senior games, plus 1 game as reserve (not called on to play).
  - Awarded a trophy as the club's "most serviceable player".
- 1940: Essendon Football Club, 16 senior games, plus 2 finals matches.
- 1941: Essendon Football Club, 12 senior games, plus 3 finals matches, including losing Grand Final team (Melbourne 19.13 (127) to Essendon's 13.20 (98)).
  - Represented Victoria against South Australia.
- 1942: Essendon Football Club, 10 senior games, plus 2 finals matches, including winning Grand Final team (Essendon 19.18 (132) to 11.13 (79),19.13 (127) to Richmond's 13.20 (98)).
- 1943: Essendon Football Club, 12 senior games, plus 2 finals matches, including losing Grand Final team (Richmond 12.14 (86) to Essendon's 11.15 (81)).
  - Runner-up to Dick Reynolds in Essendon's Best and Fairest.
- 1944: Essendon Football Club, 17 senior games, plus 2 finals matches, including losing Grand Final team (Richmond 16.12 (108) to Essendon's 12.15 (87)).
- 1945: Did not play, war service.
- 1946: Essendon Football Club, 17 senior games, plus 3 finals matches, including a drawn Second Semi Final (Essendon 14.16 (100) to Collingwood 13.22 (100), and the winning Grand Final team (Essendon 22.18 (150) to Melbourne's 13.9 (87)).
  - Made a life Member of the Essendon Football Club.
- 1947: Essendon Football Club, no senior games, 1 finals match, in a Grand Final team that lost by just one point: Carlton 13.8 (86) to Essendon's 11.19 (85).
- 1948: Euroa Football Club, captain-coach.
- 1949: Colac Football Club, captain-coach.
- 1950: Colac Football Club, captain-coach.
- 1951: Colac Football Club, captain-coach.

== Military service ==
He served with the RAAF in World War II.

== Death ==
He died at Colac, Victoria on 3 September 1994.
