= Buttsworth =

Buttsworth may refer to:

- Coral Buttsworth (1900–1985), Australian tennis player
- Fred Buttsworth (1927–2021), Australian rules footballer
- Fred Buttsworth (cricketer, born 1880) (1880–1974), Australian cricketer
- Wally Buttsworth (1917–2002), Australian rules footballer
