= Ken Baxter (footballer) =

Australian rules footballer, born 1917

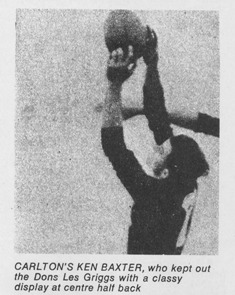
- Baxter marking the ball during a match in 1941

Personal information
- Full name: Kenneth Matthew Patrick Baxter
- Born: 20 August 1917; Werribee, Victoria
- Died: 27 April 1959 (aged 41); Parkville, Victoria
- Original team: Werribee I.N.F.
- Debut: Round 3, 1938, Carlton vs. Essendon, at Windy Hill
- Height: 183 cm (6 ft 0 in)
- Weight: 81 kg (179 lb)

Playing career^{1}
Years	Club	Games (Goals)
1938–41, 1945–50	Carlton	153 (365)
- ^{1} Playing statistics correct to the end of 1950.

Career highlights
- Carlton premiership player: 1938, 1945, 1947; Carlton leading goalkicker: 1939, 1946, 1947, 1948, 1949 & 1950

Ken Baxter (20 August 1917 – 27 April 1959) was an Australian rules footballer in the Victorian Football League (VFL). Playing for Carlton over a thirteen-year span, Baxter was a three-time premiership player and six-time club leading goalkicker.

== Career ==
A versatile key position player, Baxter played in many positions throughout his career. Especially early in his career, he was a ruckman adept at stoppage tactics and clearing the ball to advantage, while he also played at centre half-forward and often at centre half back – which some observers felt was his best position. However, he was best known as an acrobatic full forward who led Carlton's goalkicking in six of his ten seasons at the club. He was widely lauded for his sure hands and strong overhead marking throughout his career.

Baxter played his first senior football for Irish National Foresters in the Werribee District league, beginning his senior career in 1934 at age 17, where he was competition's best and fairest player in 1935 and 1937. He joined the Werribee team in the Geelong & District Football League, and in 1936 was club best and fairest and runner-up in the competition's best and fairest.

In mid-1935, Baxter signed with VFL club Richmond, and played practice matches there in 1936 but otherwise never played for the club. He subsequently signed with Carlton prior to the 1938 season and made his senior debut early in the season. He played many key positions throughout the year, and notably kicked eight goals from full forward in the second semi-final. He was full forward in Carlton's 1938 premiership team; in the grand final he was a dominant presence with his marking, although due to poor set shot kicking – which dogged much the early part of Baxter's career – he finished the game with only 3.2 and many more shots which failed to score. He won the club's best first year player award in 1938.

In 1939, as a full forward and occasional centre half back, Baxter won Carlton's leading goalkicker award for the first time with a career-high 65 goals. His next two seasons were spent mostly at centre half-back. He left Carlton to serve in the army during World War II, playing army matches during that time.

Baxter returned to the club while on leave in the second half of the 1945 season. Assuming the full forward position again, Baxter was one of several star key position players – including Bert Deacon and Lance Collins – who returned to the Carlton team from active service in the middle of the 1945 season, and helped the struggling team recover from a 3–6 start to a 13–7 record, a finals berth, and the premiership. Baxter almost missed the 1945 grand final, an extension to his leave having been denied, before his captain – a Carlton supporter – granted him leave to travel to Melbourne for the match; he kicked two goals in the match. Despite his short season, he was second in the club's best and fairest for the season, his best result for the award in his career. At this time, he was considered near the peak of his career, and among the best footballers in the league.

With Bert Deacon assuming Carlton's centre half-back position in the late 1940s, Baxter played mostly at full forward for the rest of his career. He was the club's leading goalkicker each year from 1946 to 1950 (tied with Ray Garby in 1948), becoming the first player to lead the Carlton goalkicking five years in a row.

Baxter played a small but key role in his third premiership for the club in 1947. He had come into the grand final team against Essendon as a reserve, having missed the previous two months with a knee injury, and took the field only in the final quarter at centre half-back to relieve Deacon, who was injured. Late in the final quarter, he followed his opponent Dick Reynolds to Carlton's forward line, and with fresh legs had a decisive impact in ruck contests. In the final minute, it was Baxter's tap-out which set up Fred Stafford to kick the winning goal in Carlton's one-point victory.

After considering retirement at the end of 1949, Baxter played one more season. He retired, aged 33, at the end of the 1950 season. Retiring with 365 goals from 153 games, he was, at the time, Carlton's third-highest career goalkicker behind Harry Vallence (722) and Horrie Clover (396); as of 2025 he is the club's eighth-highest goalkicker. Baxter was the only player to play in all three of Carlton's 1938, 1945 and 1947 premiership teams, and he was inducted into the Carlton Football Club Hall of Fame in 1997.

== Personal life ==
The son of William John Baxter, and Margaret Baxter, née Nihill, Kenneth Matthew Patrick Baxter was born on 20 August 1917. He was the eldest of eight children, who included younger brothers Bill, who played three seasons for Melbourne; and Bernie, who played three seasons with Carlton from 1949 to 1951 and played eleven matches with Ken.

In 1944, Baxter married Maisie Diggins, the cousin of Brighton Diggins, who was Carlton's captain-coach when Baxter joined the club in 1938. They were already courting when Baxter joined the club, and Maisie's familial connection was part of why Baxter ultimately joined Carlton after previously training with Richmond. They had one daughter.

Outside football, Baxter worked as a traffic officer. He served as a private in ordinance during World War II, his service interrupting his playing career between 1942 and mid-1945.

Baxter died suddenly of a brain aneurysm on 27 April 1959, aged 41.
