= 1947 Brownlow Medal =

- Winner: Bert Deacon (Carlton); 23 votes

The 1947 Brownlow Medal was the 20th year the award was presented to the player adjudged the fairest and best player during the Victorian Football League (VFL) home and away season. Bert Deacon of the Carlton Football Club won the medal by polling twenty-three votes during the 1947 VFL season.

== Leading votegetters ==
	Player	Votes
1st	Bert Deacon (Carlton)	23
2nd	Harold Bray (St Kilda)	21
=3rd	Wally Culpitt (Hawthorn)	18
=3rd	Ron Bywater (South Melbourne)	18
5th	Fred Flanagan (Geelong)	17
=6th	Fred Hughson (Fitzroy)	16
=6th	Don Cordner (Melbourne)	16
8th	Bill Morris (Richmond)	14
9th	Bill Hutchison (Essendon)	13
=10th	Noel Jarvis (Fitzroy)	12
=10th	Kevin Dynon (North Melbourne)	12
=10th	Bill Williams (South Melbourne)	12
