= Bernie Baxter =

Australian rules footballer

Personal information
- Full name: Bernard Patrick Baxter
- Born: 15 June 1929
- Died: 27 December 2012 (aged 83)
- Original team: Werribee
- Height: 180 cm (5 ft 11 in)
- Weight: 80 kg (176 lb)

Playing career^{1}
Years	Club	Games (Goals)
1949–1951	Carlton	28 (22)
- ^{1} Playing statistics correct to the end of 1951.

Bernie Baxter (15 June 1929 – 27 December 2012) was an Australian rules footballer in the Victorian Football League (VFL).

Growing up in Werribee, Baxter was the youngest of eight siblings which included Ken Baxter, who was a champion player at Carlton; and Bill, who played three seasons for Melbourne.

A full forward with a strong mark, Baxter first trained with Carlton in 1947, and made his senior debut for the club in 1949. At the end of the year, he was a reserve in the losing 1949 VFL grand final team.

After the departures of Carlton's main forwards – Ken Baxter and Ray Garby – at the end of 1950, Bernie had a chance at the club's full forward position, but lost it to Keith Warburton. He subsequently sought a clearance to several VFL opponents during 1951 but was refused permission by Carlton. He played in the club's seconds premiership at the end of the year, before departing Carlton with 28 senior matches and 22 goals.

After leaving Carlton, Baxter played twelve seasons for the Port Fairy Football Club in the Hampden Football League, becoming a legend of the club and a well-known figure in the local community. He kicked 692 goals for the club, won the league goalkicking three times, was a member of the club's premiership in 1958 which, as of 2025, remains its only premiership in the Hampden Football League. The local ground's scoreboard is named in his honour.

Baxter died in Port Fairy on 27 December 2012 after a short illness.
