= John Brown (Australian footballer, born 1923) =

Australian rules footballer

Personal information
- Full name: John Valentine Brown
- Born: 14 October 1923
- Died: 22 May 2007 (aged 83)
- Original team: Abbotsford Tech
- Height: 183 cm (6 ft 0 in)
- Weight: 80.5 kg (177 lb)
- Position: Defender

Playing career^{1}
Years	Club	Games (Goals)
1950–55	Carlton	90 (0)
- ^{1} Playing statistics correct to the end of 1955.

John Valentine Brown (14 October 1923 – 22 May 2007) was an Australian rules footballer who played with Carlton in the Victorian Football League (VFL).

== Family ==
The son of Edward Valentine Brown (1891–1957), and Lucy Catherine Brown (1891–1980), née Miller, and the brother of Edward Vincent Brown (1922–1989), John Valentine Brown was born on 14 October 1923.

His father, known as "Ted" Brown, played VFL football with St Kilda in 1911, and with Carlton from 1914 to 1920. His older brother, known as "Vin" Brown, played for Carlton from 1941 to 1948.

== Football ==
=== Carlton (VFL) ===
Formerly a competitive rugby player in New South Wales, Brown made his debut for Carlton, against Essendon, at Princes Park, on 10 June 1950 at the age of 26.

==== 30 July 1955 ====
In the round 15 match against St Kilda, Brown was reported by boundary umpire John Hicks for striking St Kilda's Ray Houston during the second quarter; the VFL Tribunal dismissed the charge on 2 August 1955.

=== East Ballarat (BFL) ===
In 1956, Brown was appointed as captain-coach of the East Ballarat Football Club in the Ballarat Football League.
