= 1942 WANFL season =

Australian rules football season

- Teams: 7
- Premiers: West Perth; 9th premiership
- Minor premiers: West Perth; 5th minor premiership
- Sandover Medallist: Laurie Bowen (West Perth)
- Leading goalkicker: Ted Brunton (West Perth)
- Matches played: 61

The 1942 WANFL season was the 58th season of the Western Australian National Football League. Whilst the previous two seasons had been increasingly affected by the drift of players to the services, the 1941/1942 off-season saw the Imperial Japanese Navy and air force move into the north of Western Australia, bombing many northwestern settlements.

Consequently, virtually all senior WANFL players had been enlisted to war work or the military. By the new year the WANFL was aware that normal senior league football would be impossible, and the league decided after debate late in February to conduct a competition for those too young for military service, with players required to be under the age of eighteen on 1 October 1942. Teams were largely drawn from the Young Sports' Temperance League, which had fifty-three clubs in 1941. Associated with the under-age competition was the temporary abolition of district football with the expectation that when peace returned players would return to the club for which they would ordinarily be zoned.

Bassendean Oval was taken over by the military before the season started, as were early in the season Fremantle Oval and the WACA – though both were vacated a third of the way through. The WANFL also had to ensure that all grounds totalled less than 200 yards (182.9 m) to prevent landing by airborne troops.

When the season was planned, it was proposed to exclude Perth and Swan Districts, who had been the bottom two clubs in 1941 and lacked adequate junior players. Perth eventually fought for inclusion, resulting in a seven-team competition with a bye until the clubs had played each other twice, after which it was announced the bottom team would drop out and, as in the WAFL between 1911 and 1913 and the 1943 VFL season, a bye-less draw was made for the last five rounds. Perth were the team to drop out, after winning two early matches, whilst 1941 premiers West Perth proved the strongest team all through the season and possessed not only the premiership but also the Sandover Medallist (a future Swan Districts player), the leading goalkicker and a future postwar star in Fred Buttsworth.

A notable tragedy occurred in August when high-flying key forward John Hetherington of Subiaco, whose superb marking won rave reviews and gave him fifty-four goals in twelve matches, was struck down by polio and became a paraplegic despite the problem being initially seen as back trouble.

== Home-and-away season ==
=== Round 1 ===
| | Round 1 |
| Saturday, 9 May (2:45 pm) | West Perth 13.13 (91) | def. | Claremont 10.15 (75) | Leederville Oval |
| Saturday, 9 May (2:45 pm) | East Perth 15.18 (108) | def. | East Fremantle 13.11 (89) | Subiaco Oval |
| Saturday, 9 May (2:45 pm) | Subiaco 10.8 (68) | def. by | South Fremantle 10.19 (79) | Claremont Oval |
| | Bye; Perth |
Potter of South Fremantle kicks eight goals and John Hetherington of Subiaco seven as critics are impressed by the standard of the first round of under-age league football.

=== Round 2 ===
| | Round 2 |
| Saturday, 16 May (2:45 pm) | East Perth 7.9 (51) | def. by | West Perth 12.15 (87) | Perth Oval |
| Saturday, 16 May (2:45 pm) | Subiaco 9.23 (77) | def. by | Perth 14.13 (97) | Subiaco Oval |
| Saturday, 16 May (2:45 pm) | Claremont 15.16 (106) | def. | East Fremantle 9.9 (63) | Claremont Oval |
| | Bye; South Fremantle |

=== Round 3 ===
| | Round 3 |
| Saturday, 23 May (2:45 pm) | South Fremantle 8.7 (55) | def. by | East Perth 9.7 (61) | Claremont Oval |
| Saturday, 23 May (2:45 pm) | Perth 17.19 (121) | def. | Claremont 15.9 (99) | WACA |
| Saturday, 23 May (2:45 pm) | Subiaco 10.9 (69) | def. by | East Fremantle 12.13 (85) | Subiaco Oval |
| | Bye; West Perth |

=== Round 4 ===
| | Round 4 |
| Saturday, 30 May (2:45 pm) | East Perth 18.12 (120) | def. | Perth 14.9 (93) | Perth Oval |
| Saturday, 30 May (2:45 pm) | South Fremantle 12.10 (82) | def. by | Claremont 16.15 (111) | Subiaco Oval |
| Saturday, 30 May (2:45 pm) | West Perth 20.17 (137) | def. | Subiaco 4.9 (33) | Leederville Oval |
| | Bye; East Fremantle |
A depleted Cardinal team, minus key forward McMahon and a number of others, trounce Subiaco with future star Fred Buttsworth kicking six.; Robin Farmer, expected to be a successor to George Moloney, kicked ten goals as Claremont rebound after a slow start.

=== Round 5 ===
| | Round 5 |
| Saturday, 6 June (2:45 pm) | East Perth 15.12 (102) | def. | Subiaco 3.10 (28) | Perth Oval |
| Saturday, 6 June (2:45 pm) | East Fremantle 11.6 (72) | drew with | South Fremantle 10.12 (72) | Fremantle Oval |
| Saturday, 6 June (2:45 pm) | Perth 10.13 (73) | def. | West Perth 6.14 (50) | Subiaco Oval |
| | Bye; Claremont |
Owing to government bans on public holiday sport, none of the traditional Foundation Day games were played until 1946.; East Perth demolish the winless Subiaco, who look at this stage likely to drop out after twelve matches.; Despite a notable comeback, Perth unexpectedly inflict West Perth's first defeat of the season.

=== Round 6 ===
| | Round 6 |
| Saturday, 13 June (2:45 pm) | South Fremantle 10.17 (77) | def. by | West Perth 19.12 (126) | Fremantle Oval |
| Saturday, 13 June (2:45 pm) | Subiaco 10.14 (74) | def. | Claremont 8.11 (59) | Subiaco Oval |
| Saturday, 13 June (2:45 pm) | Perth 9.12 (66) | def. by | East Fremantle 16.17 (113) | WACA |
| | Bye; East Perth |
Subiaco rally to win their first match for the season after being behind for all but the last seven minutes.

=== Round 7 ===
| | Round 7 |
| Saturday, 20 June (2:45 pm) | South Fremantle 17.16 (118) | def. | Perth 8.7 (55) | Fremantle Oval |
| Saturday, 20 June (2:45 pm) | Claremont 14.11 (95) | def. | East Perth 10.9 (69) | Claremont Oval |
| Saturday, 20 June (2:45 pm) | West Perth 10.8 (68) | def. | East Fremantle 10.5 (65) | Subiaco Oval |
| | Bye; Subiaco |

=== Round 8 ===
| | Round 8 |
| Saturday, 27 June (2:45 pm) | Claremont 14.12 (96) | def. | West Perth 16.12 (108) | Claremont Oval |
| Saturday, 27 June (2:45 pm) | East Fremantle 9.8 (62) | def. by | East Perth 9.15 (69) | Fremantle Oval |
| Saturday, 27 June (2:45 pm) | Subiaco 12.9 (81) | def. | South Fremantle 10.10 (70) | Subiaco Oval |
| | Bye; Perth |
Ray Perry, as a ruckman a star of East Perth's 1944 perfect season, kicks seven of nine goals to win a thriller for the Royals, without "Todge" Campbell due to the flu.

=== Round 9 ===
| | Round 9 |
| Saturday, 4 July (2:45 pm) | East Fremantle 12.8 (80) | def. | Claremont 6.4 (40) | Fremantle Oval |
| Saturday, 4 July (2:45 pm) | West Perth 16.11 (107) | def. | East Perth 7.10 (52) | Leederville Oval |
| Saturday, 4 July (2:45 pm) | Perth 9.10 (64) | def. by | Subiaco 14.6 (90) | WACA |
| | Bye; South Fremantle |
Brunton kicks nine goals to continue the slump of the Royals, who regained Campbell but lost another 1944 star-to-be in Alan Watts.

=== Round 10 ===
| | Round 10 |
| Saturday, 11 July (2:45 pm) | Claremont 9.11 (65) | def. | Perth 3.12 (30) | Claremont Oval |
| Saturday, 11 July (2:45 pm) | Subiaco 8.6 (54) | def. by | East Fremantle 15.20 (110) | Subiaco Oval |
| Saturday, 11 July (2:45 pm) | East Perth 10.12 (72) | def. by | South Fremantle 13.5 (83) | Perth Oval |
| | Bye; West Perth |
Perth kick the lowest score conceded by Claremont to that point, beating out 5.7 (37) by South Fremantle in 1936.

=== Round 11 ===
| | Round 11 |
| Saturday, 18 July (2:45 pm) | Perth 8.5 (53) | def. by | East Perth 22.10 (142) | Subiaco Oval |
| Saturday, 18 July (2:45 pm) | South Fremantle 8.11 (59) | def. by | Claremont 20.6 (126) | Fremantle Oval |
| Saturday, 18 July (2:45 pm) | West Perth 13.20 (98) | def. | Subiaco 11.13 (79) | Leederville Oval |
| | Bye; East Fremantle |

=== Round 12 ===
| | Round 12 |
| Saturday, 25 July (2:45 pm) | Perth 6.3 (39) | def. by | West Perth 29.20 (194) | WACA |
| Saturday, 25 July (2:45 pm) | Subiaco 16.13 (109) | def. | East Perth 6.10 (46) | Subiaco Oval |
| Saturday, 25 July (2:45 pm) | South Fremantle 4.3 (27) | def. by | East Fremantle 12.9 (81) | Fremantle Oval |
| | Bye; Claremont |
With Brunton kicking ten goals, West Perth record to that point their biggest win and the second-highest score in WANFL competition.; As a result of Subiaco's win, Perth's Round 14 match with South Fremantle determines who will drop out.

=== Round 13 ===
| | Round 13 |
| Saturday, 1 August (2:45 pm) | Perth 8.7 (55) | def. by | East Fremantle 12.18 (90) | Subiaco Oval |
| Saturday, 1 August (2:45 pm) | Claremont 9.10 (64) | def. by | Subiaco 11.9 (75) | Claremont Oval |
| Saturday, 1 August (2:45 pm) | West Perth 17.12 (114) | def. | South Fremantle 8.8 (56) | Leederville Oval |
| | Bye; East Perth |
Subiaco's John Hetherington, in his last match before contracting poliomyelitis and becoming a paraplegic, kicks six goals to ensure Subiaco would play the full season.

=== Round 14 ===
| | Round 14 |
| Saturday, 8 August (2:45 pm) | East Fremantle 11.11 (77) | def. | West Perth 8.8 (56) | Fremantle Oval |
| Saturday, 8 August (2:45 pm) | East Perth 12.10 (82) | def. | Claremont 4.2 (26) | Perth Oval |
| Saturday, 8 August (2:45 pm) | Perth 5.11 (41) | def. by | South Fremantle 8.10 (58) | Subiaco Oval |
| | Bye; Subiaco |
On an exceptionally windy afternoon, South Fremantle overcome Perth in a dour game and consign the Redlegs to dropping out of the competition.; Claremont become the first WANFL team to fail to score in the second and third quarters since Subiaco against Perth in the opening round of 1921. (Note: There have been two instances since, in 1967 and 1998.)

=== Round 15 ===
| | Round 15 |
| Saturday, 15 August (2:45 pm) | Claremont 6.5 (41) | def. by | East Fremantle 8.7 (55) | Claremont Oval |
| Saturday, 15 August (2:45 pm) | West Perth 14.7 (91) | def. by | East Perth 13.21 (99) | Subiaco Oval |
| Saturday, 15 August (2:45 pm) | South Fremantle 10.21 (81) | drew with | Subiaco 11.15 (81) | Fremantle Oval |
Two amazing recoveries see South Fremantle come back to draw with Subiaco, and East Perth, against the pacesetters, achieve their biggest comeback from a three-quarter-time deficit since 1922.; Following this match, Subiaco would become the first club to play 400 games for no draws, not drawing again until Round 11 of 1962.

=== Round 16 ===
| | Round 16 |
| Saturday, 22 August (2:45 pm) | Subiaco 13.9 (87) | def. | Claremont 8.14 (62) | Subiaco Oval |
| Saturday, 22 August (2:45 pm) | East Fremantle 10.5 (65) | def. | East Perth 4.11 (35) | Fremantle Oval |
| Saturday, 22 August (2:45 pm) | West Perth 16.18 (114) | def. | South Fremantle 11.8 (74) | Leederville Oval |

=== Round 17 ===
| | Round 17 |
| Saturday, 29 August (2:45 pm) | East Perth 7.8 (50) | def. | Subiaco 5.7 (37) | Perth Oval |
| Saturday, 29 August (2:45 pm) | East Fremantle 7.8 (50) | def. by | West Perth 10.9 (69) | Subiaco Oval |
| Saturday, 29 August (2:45 pm) | South Fremantle 11.15 (81) | def. by | Claremont 15.13 (103) | Fremantle Oval |
East Perth's win over the Maroons in a dour game owing to a powerful wind despite the absence of rain threatens Subiaco's hold on the last top four berth.

=== Round 18 ===
| | Round 18 |
| Saturday, 5 September (2:45 pm) | Claremont 17.7 (109) | def. | East Perth 16.5 (101) | Claremont Oval |
| Saturday, 5 September (2:45 pm) | South Fremantle 4.5 (29) | def. by | East Fremantle 7.19 (61) | Fremantle Oval |
| Saturday, 5 September (2:45 pm) | Subiaco 7.11 (53) | def. by | West Perth 9.13 (67) | Subiaco Oval |
A brilliant display in the centre by former full forward Robin Farmer, and nine goals from the fast-leading Bourke, allows Claremont a critical win that regains them a place in the four and sets the stage for a thrilling last round.

=== Round 19 ===
| | Round 19 |
| Saturday, 12 September (2:45 pm) | East Fremantle 10.4 (64) | def. by | Subiaco 9.13 (67) | Fremantle Oval |
| Saturday, 12 September (2:45 pm) | West Perth 4.7 (31) | def. by | Claremont 9.15 (69) | Subiaco Oval |
| Saturday, 12 September (2:45 pm) | East Perth 7.13 (55) | def. | South Fremantle 2.12 (24) | Perth Oval |
Subiaco win a sensational finish after being 35 points down at three-quarter time on a damp and windy day, but a brilliant display by Claremont against the premiers ensures they remain in the top four.

== Ladder ==
1942 WANFL ladder
| Pos | Team | Pld | W | L | D | PF | PA | PP | Pts |
|---|---|---|---|---|---|---|---|---|---|
| 1 | West Perth (P) | 17 | 13 | 4 | 0 | 1608 | 1118 | 143.8 | 52 |
| 2 | East Fremantle | 17 | 10 | 6 | 1 | 1282 | 1031 | 124.3 | 42 |
| 3 | East Perth | 17 | 10 | 7 | 0 | 1314 | 1213 | 108.3 | 40 |
| 4 | Claremont | 17 | 8 | 9 | 0 | 1346 | 1289 | 104.4 | 32 |
| 5 | Subiaco | 17 | 7 | 9 | 1 | 1162 | 1335 | 87.0 | 30 |
| 6 | South Fremantle | 17 | 4 | 11 | 2 | 1125 | 1422 | 79.1 | 20 |
| 7 | Perth | 12 | 3 | 9 | 0 | 787 | 1216 | 64.7 | 12 |

Rules for classification: 1) points; 2) percentage; 3) number of points for.
(P) Premiers

== Finals ==
=== First semi-final ===
| | First semi-final |
| Saturday, 19 September (2:45 pm) | Claremont 7.20 (62) | def. | East Perth 7.7 (49) | Subiaco Oval (crowd: 1,226) |
Robin Sandover's power in the ruck leads Claremont to victory in a fast match with numerous bruising but fair bumps.

=== Second semi-final ===
| | Second semi-final |
| Saturday, 26 September (2:45 pm) | West Perth 9.24 (78) | def. | East Fremantle 10.10 (70) | Subiaco Oval (crowd: 2,335) |
As in the previous match, a dominant ruckman – in this case West Perth's Berg – ensures a comeback victory in a tough match.

=== Preliminary final ===
| | Preliminary final |
| Saturday, 3 October (2:45 pm) | Claremont 11.6 (72) | def. | East Fremantle 9.11 (65) | Subiaco Oval |
Claremont continue their run of excellent form with a fine team effort to qualify for the Grand Final against the Cardinals.

=== Grand Final ===
1942 WANFL Grand Final
Saturday, 10 October (2:45 pm) | West Perth | def. | Claremont | Subiaco Oval (crowd: 5,308)
4.2 (26); 9.10 (64); 13.14 (92); 19.16 (130) | Q1; Q2; Q3; Final | 3.4 (22); 3.5 (23); 8.10 (58); 11.13 (79) | Umpires: F Ryan
Brunton 6, Buttsworth 4, Latham 3, Berg 2, Spiers, Anning, Bidstrip, Travers | Goals | Burke 4, Archbold 2, Oliver 2, Thomas, Dempster, Thompson
Harman, Latham, Larcombe, Buttsworth, Price, Lynch, Berg, Bowen | Best | Oliver, Thompson, Archbold, W. Sandover, Burke, H. White, Chalkley, Farmer, Thomas
Claremont, handicapped by the absence of Robin Sandover for the first ten minutes, are always behind the Cardinals, who secure the flag with 5.8 (38) to 0.1 (1) in the second quarter.
