= George Stafford (footballer) =

Australian rules footballer

Personal information
- Full name: George Henry Esmond Stafford
- Born: 21 October 1930
- Died: 30 July 2010 (aged 79); Doncaster, Victoria
- Original team: Northcote
- Height: 178 cm (5 ft 10 in)
- Weight: 76 kg (168 lb)

Playing career^{1}
Years	Club	Games (Goals)
1951–1954	Carlton	23 (0)
1955	Brighton (VFA)	
- ^{1} Playing statistics correct to the end of 1954.

George Henry Esmond Stafford (21 October 1930 – 30 July 2010), was an Australian rules footballer who played with Carlton in the Victorian Football League (VFL), and with Brighton in the Victorian Football Association (VFA).

== Family ==
George Henry Esmond Stafford was born on 21 October 1930. He was the younger brother of Carlton footballer Fred Stafford.

He married Betty Harper in 1952.

He died on 30 July 2010 at Doncaster, Victoria.

== Carlton (VFL) ==
Playing either on the half-back flank or back pocket, Stafford was recruited from Northcote in 1949. He was a member of the Carlton Under 19s 1949 premiership team, the 1951 Reserves premiership team (winning the team's "most consistent player award" in 1951), and the 1953 Reserves premiership team.

He played his first senior match for Carlton in the round 16 match against Fitzroy, on 18 August 1951, and played the last of his 25 senior matches when he was selected in place of an injured Bruce Comben in the round 16 match against Essendon on 14 August 1954. Stafford was injured during that match, and was unable to be selected in the next week's team.

His last game for the Carlton Football Club was in the round 18 Reserves match against Geelong on 29 August 1954, in which he kicked 5 goals (he was not selected in the Carlton Reserves Second Semi-Final team that thrashed Geelong, 19.22 (136) to 9.8 (62) on 11 September 1954).

== 4 September 1954 ==
On Tuesday, 21 September 1954, Carlton First XVIII half-back flanker Stafford, a spectator at the match, was convicted at Carlton Court of jumping the fence and assaulting both of the boundary umpires (John Joseph McNiff, and Desmond Nicholas Fitzgerald) who had officiated at the VFL Third XVIII Grand Final between Carlton and Footscray at Princes Park, on 4 September 1954.

He was found guilty on both charges and was fined £5 on each charge, with £4/15/- costs (in default 10 days jail).

== Suspension ==
On Wednesday, 10 November 1954, a VFL Investigation Committee, after considering the evidence, found Stafford guilty of striking both boundary umpires, and suspended him for the first four games of the 1955 season.

Although his name appears in Carlton's Final 1955 Training List as "to be considered when available", Stafford did not play for Carlton ever again.

== Brighton (VFA) ==
Once his VFL suspension had been served, he started playing for the VFA club, Brighton, where he had been training whilst suspended.

His clearance from Carlton was approved on 18 May 1955, and he played his first match for Brighton in round 6 of the 1955 season, on Saturday, 20 May 1955.
