= Ted Brown (Australian footballer) =

Australian rules footballer

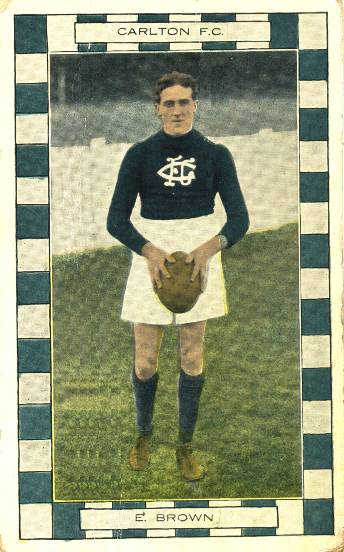
- Cigarette card of Brown during his Carlton career

Personal information
- Full name: Edward Valentine Brown
- Born: 18 October 1891; Bendigo
- Died: 8 December 1957 (aged 66); Parkville, Victoria
- Original team: South Ballarat/Caulfield Jnrs
- Height: 173 cm (5 ft 8 in)
- Weight: 68 kg (150 lb)
- Position: Half back/Wing

Playing career^{1}
Years	Club	Games (Goals)
1911	St Kilda	4 (1)
1914–20	Carlton	95 (1)
Total		99 (2)
- ^{1} Playing statistics correct to the end of 1920.

Edward Valentine Brown (18 October 1891 – 8 December 1957) was an Australian rules footballer who played for St Kilda and Carlton in the Victorian Football League (VFL).

== Family ==
The son of Mungo Brown (1861-1911), and Margaret Ann Brown (1863-1933), née Peel, Edward Valentine Brown was born in Bendigo on 18 October 1891.

He married Lucy Catherine Miller (1891-1980) in 1921. Their sons, Vincent (1922-1989), and John (1923-2007), also played for Carlton (117 games and 90 games, respectively).

== Football ==
=== St Kilda ===
Ted Brown played with Ararat Football Club in 1911–13, 18 games, including premierships in the 1911 and 1912 Wimmera & District Football Association. He played with Ararat on Wednesdays and in Ballarat on Saturdays.

Brown, who was brought up in Ballarat, was recruited to St Kilda from Caulfield. He couldn't establish a place in the St Kilda team and left at the year's end.

=== Carlton ===
He returned to the VFL in 1914, joining Carlton, and was a wingman in their 1914 premiership team, and a half-back flanker in their 1915 premiership team (his son, Vin Brown, was also a dual premiership player for Carlton).

=== Yarragon ===
He was captain-coach of the Yarragon Football Club, in the Central Gippsland Football Association, in 1921, 1922, and 1923; the team won the premiership in 1921.

=== Maffra ===
He was appointed captain-coach of Maffra Football Club in 1924.

=== Traralgon ===
He was cleared from Maffra to Traralgon in 1925, and played in Traralgon's 1925 premiership team. He played for Traralgon for four years – 1925 to 1928 – and was the team's captain-coach of the team in 1928.

=== Yea ===
He was cleared from Traralgon to Yea in 1930.

== Military service ==
He joined the First AIF in January 1916, and was discharged on medical grounds in March 1917. He did not serve overseas.

== Death ==
He died in Parkville, Victoria on 8 December 1957.
