= Vin Brown =

Australian rules footballer

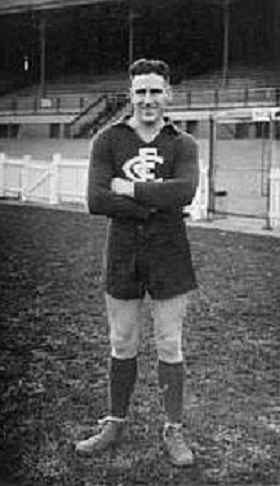
- Brown in 1945

Personal information
- Full name: Edward Vincent Brown
- Born: 5 February 1922; Warragul, Victoria
- Died: 11 May 1989 (aged 67)
- Original team: Thornbury CYMS (CYMSFA)
- Debut: Round 4, 1941, Carlton vs. North Melbourne, at Arden Street
- Height: 178 cm (5 ft 10 in)
- Weight: 73 kg (161 lb)

Playing career^{1}
| Years | Club | Games (Goals) |
| 1941–1948 | Carlton | 117 (4) |
- ^{1} Playing statistics correct to the end of 1948.

Edward Vincent Brown (5 February 1922 – 11 May 1989) was an Australian rules footballer who played for Carlton in the Victorian Football League (VFL) during the 1940s.

Brown possessed exceptional pace, he was a Stawell Gift finalist in 1946, and was used on the wing when he started out at Carlton during the 1941 VFL season. In his second season Brown began playing as a key defender to fill the gap left by players who were serving in the war. He went onto be full-back in Carlton's 1945 premiership side, and was considered best on ground in the grand final when he stood South Melbourne's star forward Laurie Nash.

Brown was a half back flanker in Carlton's next premiership, playing most of the Grand Final on Essendon's leading player Dick Reynolds. A twisted ankle sustained in the 1948 VFL season prompted Brown to retire.

His father Ted Brown was also a dual premiership player at Carlton, only Sergio and Stephen Silvagni have repeated this feat for the club.

His younger brother, John, also played for Carlton.

== Death ==
He died on 11 May 1989.

== See also ==
- The 1945 "Bloodbath" VFL Grand Final
