= Joe Sullivan (footballer) =

Australian rules footballer

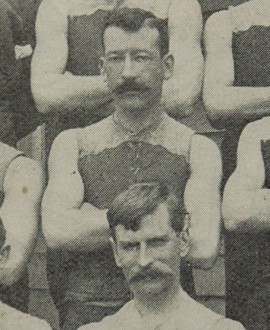
- Sullivan during his Carlton career

Personal information
- Full name: Joseph Sullivan
- Born: 1 February 1877; Collingwood, Victoria
- Died: 10 July 1935 (aged 58); Heidelberg, Victoria
- Original team: Rutherglen
- Position: Forward

Playing career^{1}
Years	Club	Games (Goals)
1900–1903	Carlton	54 (63)
- ^{1} Playing statistics correct to the end of 1903.

Career highlights
- 3x Carlton leading goalkicker 1900, 1901, 1903

Joseph Sullivan (1 February 1877 – 10 July 1935) was an Australian rules footballer who played with Carlton in the Victorian Football League (VFL).

Sullivan had played for both Rutherglen and Port Melbourne by the time he arrived at Carlton. He was Carlton's leading goal-kicker in three of his four seasons, with 18 goals in 1900, 14 goals in 1901 and 27 goals in 1903. The only year he didn't top the goal-kicking was in 1902 season, when he was club captain before getting injured. He represented Victoria in 1903.
