= Rod Galt =

Australian rules footballer (1951–2019)

Personal information
- Full name: Rodney Maxwell Galt
- Born: 9 October 1951
- Died: 9 April 2019 (aged 67); Southport, Queensland, Australia
- Original team: Beaumaris (SESFL)
- Height: 194 cm (6 ft 4 in)
- Weight: 92 kg (203 lb)

Playing career^{1}
Years	Club	Games (Goals)
1971–1974	St Kilda	77 (79)
1975–1979	Carlton	46 (100)
1980-1982	West Torrens	43 (58)
1985	Prahran	13 (48)
Total		179 (285)
- ^{1} Playing statistics correct to the end of 1979.

Career highlights
- Carlton leading goalkicker: 1978

Rodney Maxwell Galt (9 October 1951 – 9 April 2019) was an Australian rules footballer in the Victorian Football League (VFL) and South Australian National Football League (SANFL).

A ruckman and forward, Galt made his debut for St Kilda in 1971 and played there for four seasons, before moving to Carlton in 1975. He played only eleven games for Carlton in his first three seasons with the club, and was loaned to New South Wales Australian Football League club Western Suburbs in 1977, where he won a premiership. He was a regular in the Carlton forward line in 1978, winning the club's goalkicking with 49 goals. He played another 14 games in 1979, but was dropped from the team prior to the finals and was cleared at the end of the season. Galt then played for SANFL club West Torrens from 1980 until 1982, and then for Prahran in the Victorian Football Association (VFA) in 1985.

He later was the head of surfwear company Byrning Spears and purchased a beachfront house on the Gold Coast for $17 million. He later sold it for only $9.5 million after falling in debt.
