= Bob Standfield =

Australian rules footballer

Personal information
- Full name: Robert B Standfeild
- Born: 30 September 1915
- Died: 1 October 1993 (aged 78)
- Original team: Leongatha / Fish Creek
- Height: 183 cm (6 ft 0 in)
- Weight: 82 kg (181 lb)

Playing career^{1}
Years	Club	Games (Goals)
1938–1940	Essendon	26 (1)
1942	Carlton	1 (0)
Total		27 (1)
- ^{1} Playing statistics correct to the end of 1942.

Bob Standfield (30 September 1915 – 1 October 1993) is a former Australian rules footballer who played with Carlton and Essendon in the Victorian Football League (VFL). In between his stints at Essendon and Carlton, Standfield played for Brunswick. His brother, Paul Standfield, also played in the VFL.
