= Ken Newton =

Australian rules footballer

Personal information
- Full name: Kenneth William Newton
- Born: 17 April 1924; Melbourne, Victoria
- Died: 3 November 2006 (aged 82)
- Original team: Wesley College
- Height: 183 cm (6 ft 0 in)
- Weight: 87 kg (192 lb)

Playing career^{1}
Years	Club	Games (Goals)
1947–50	Essendon	24 (19)
1950–51	Hawthorn	9 (11)
Total		33 (30)
- ^{1} Playing statistics correct to the end of 1951.

Kenneth William Newton MC (17 April 1924 – 3 November 2006) was an Australian rules footballer who played for Essendon and Hawthorn in the Victorian Football League (VFL).

== War Service ==
Newton enlisted to serve in the Australian Army at Duntroon in Canberra in December 1944. In July 1945 he was awarded the Military Cross for "outstanding personal courage at Ulupu, New Guinea" displayed in combat with Japanese troops. Newton remained in the Army until May 1951.

== Football ==
Newton was recruited locally to Essendon and played as a reserve in their 1947 Grand Final loss to Carlton. He kicked five goals in a game at Princes Park against the same opponents the following season. Newton often struggled to make the seniors in what was a strong Essendon side so during the 1950 season crossed to Hawthorn.
