= Ian Davies (basketball) =

Australian basketball player

Personal information
- Born: 29 January 1956 Longford, Tasmania
- Died: 7 November 2013 (aged 57) Hobart, Tasmania
- Listed height: 6 ft 6 in (1.98 m)
- Listed weight: 194 lb (88 kg)

Career information
- College: Graceland (1974–1978)
- NBA draft: 1978: undrafted
- Playing career: 1978–1990
- Position: Forward

Career history
- 1978–1979: Maine Lumberjacks
- 1980–1981: Launceston Casino City
- 1982–1985: Newcastle Falcons
- 1986–1987: Geelong Supercats
- 1988–1990: Sydney Kings

Career highlights
- All-NBL Team (1980); NBL champion (1981); NBL Hall of Fame inductee

Ian Davies (1 January 1956 – 7 November 2013) was an Australian basketball player who played 252 games in Australia's National Basketball League (NBL) for the Launceston Casino City (1980-1981), Newcastle Falcons (1982-1985), Geelong Supercats (1986-1987), Sydney Kings (1988-1990). Davies also played on the Australian national basketball team in the 1980 Summer Olympics and 1984 Summer Olympics.

== NBL career ==
Davies started his NBL career in 1980 with the new franchise Launceston Casino City. In 1981 he was a member of the Casino City's NBL Championship winning team. In that year he finished sixth in the league in scoring.

For the 1982 season Davies moved to the Newcastle Falcons, where he played 105 games over four years, before spending two seasons with the Geelong Supercats.

In 1988 Davies again moved to a new franchise, this time the Sydney Kings. In game 1 of the Kings' 1989 quarter-finals appearance against the Melbourne Tigers, Davies scored 30 points in 18 minutes of game time, after averaging just 8.1 points per game during the regular season.

His NBL Career spanned 252 games and 2684 points at 17.8 ppg.

== International career ==
Davies played for the Australian team at the 1980 Summer Olympics in Moscow, where Australia finished eighth, and at the 1984 Summer Olympics in Los Angeles, where Australia finished seventh.

Davies was the top scorer in the 1980 Olympics, scoring 209 points in 7 games, at an average of 29.3 per game.

Davies also represented Australia in the 1982 World Championships in Colombia and 1986 World Championships in Spain. He scored the second most total points in the 1982 tournament (187), at an average of 23.4 per game.

== Later biography ==
After retiring from the NBL Davies had a brief playing stint with Manly Warringah's State League team.

After retiring as an active player, Davies was the Director of the Darling Harbour Sports Centre in Sydney.

In 2005 Davies was an assistant coach with the Adelaide 36ers.

Davies died in Hobart of unspecified causes on 7 November 2013 at the age of 57.

== Awards ==
In 2001 Davies was inducted as a member of the NBL Hall of Fame.

In 2003 Davies received 8 votes in the NBL 25th Anniversary All-Time team.

== Personal life ==
Davies was the son of Carlton and Longford footballer Fred Davies.
