= Ern Henfry =

Australian rules footballer and coach

Personal information
- Full name: Ernest Edgar Henfry
- Born: 24 July 1921; Perth, Western Australia
- Died: 14 January 2007 (aged 85); Inglewood, Western Australia
- Height: 183 cm (6 ft 0 in)
- Weight: 83 kg (183 lb)
- Position: Centre

Playing career
Years	Club	Games (Goals)
1937–1941	Perth	51 (70)
1944	RAAF (NSW)	[?]
1944	Carlton	2 (0)
1945	Perth	1 (2)
1947–1952	Carlton	82 (20)
1953–1954	Perth	22 (17)

Representative team honours
Years	Team	Games (Goals)
1939	Western Australia	2 (2)
1949	Victoria	2 ([?])

Coaching career
Years	Club	Games (W–L–D)
1953–1964	Perth	242 (139–103–0)
1956–1957	Western Australia	6 (3–3–0)

Career highlights
- Runner-up Sandover Medal 1941; Perth best and fairest 1941; Carlton captain 1947–1952; Carlton premiership captain 1947; Carlton best and fairest 1947, 1949; Victoria captain 1949; Perth captain-coach 1953–1954; Perth premiership coach 1955; West Australian Football Hall of Fame (inducted 2004); Australian Football Hall of Fame (inducted 2014)

Ernest Edgar Henfry (24 July 1921 – 14 January 2007) was an Australian rules footballer who played for Perth in the Western Australian National Football League (WANFL) and Carlton in the Victorian Football League (VFL). He later served as coach of Perth, and also coached Western Australia, having previously played at state level for both Western Australia and Victoria. He was inducted into the Australian Football Hall of Fame in 2014.

== Playing career ==
Henfry made his senior debut for Perth during the 1937 season, aged 16 years and 49 days, with only seven other players known to have debuted at a younger age. He played twice at state level during the 1939 season, at the age of 17, and then finished second to Haydn Bunton in the 1941 Sandover Medal.

During the Second World War, Henfry served in the Australian Defence Force, initially as a private in the Australian Army, and then as a flight lieutenant in the Royal Australian Air Force (RAAF). While training in Sydney, he played for a RAAF team in the New South Wales Australian National Football League, which included several VFL and SANFL players, including Footscray captain Alby Morrison.

In 1944, while based in Victoria, Henfry played two games for Carlton. He continued to fly back to Sydney weekly to turn out for the RAAF side as part of sanctioned training. When the war ended, he remained in Victoria, and Carlton requested a clearance from Perth to enable him to play for them. He was forced to sit out the 1946 season as Perth did not agree to a clearance, but was then able to captain Carlton for the 1947 season. It was a successful year, with Carlton defeating Essendon in a one-point thriller in the grand final. The season was capped off when Henfry shared Carlton's best and fairest award with his close friend Bert Deacon, who also won the Brownlow Medal that year, Carlton's first. Henfry placed fourth in the Brownlow count.

In 1949, after some controversy, Henfry captained Victoria against Western Australia, being only the second man to represent Victoria after first representing Western Australia.

== Coaching career ==
Returning to Western Australia before the 1953 season, Henfry captain-coached Perth for two seasons before retiring from playing. He remained as non-playing coach, and in 1955 coached Perth to its first premiership since 1907, with the club winning the grand final by two points over East Fremantle. Henfry remained Perth's coach until the 1959 season, and then again from the 1962 season through to the 1964 season, overall coaching the club in 242 games with a win rate of 57.4%.

He also coached the state team in six matches during the 1956 and 1957 seasons, including at the 1956 Australian National Football Carnival, held in Perth, with Western Australia placing second. During the 1961 season, in the gap between his years coaching Perth, Henfry coached the University of Western Australia's side in the Western Australian Amateur Football League to an A-grade premiership.

== Death ==
Henfry died in Inglewood, a suburb of Perth, in January 2007, aged 85. He had been an inaugural inductee into the West Australian Football Hall of Fame in 2004, and was posthumously inducted into the Australian Football Hall of Fame in 2014.
