= Bill Baxter (Australian footballer) =

Australian rules footballer, born 1919

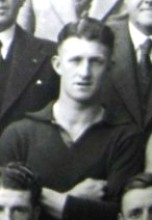

Personal information
- Full name: William John Baxter
- Born: 29 May 1919; Werribee, Victoria
- Died: 23 March 1983 (aged 63); Werribee, Victoria
- Original team: Werribee
- Height: 183 cm (6 ft 0 in)
- Weight: 79 kg (174 lb)

Playing career^{1}
Years	Club	Games (Goals)
1939–41	Melbourne	20 (0)
- ^{1} Playing statistics correct to the end of 1941.

William John Baxter (29 May 1919 – 23 March 1983) was an Australian rules footballer who played with Melbourne in the Victorian Football League (VFL).

== Family ==
The son of William John Thomas Baxter (1892-1963), and Margaret Josephine Baxter (1888-1972), née Nihill, William John Baxter was born in Werribee, Victoria on 29 May 1919.

His brothers, Kenneth Matthew Patrick Baxter (1917-1959), and Bernard Patrick Baxter (1929-2012), both played with Carlton in the VFL.

He married Olive Lillian Sneezewell (1919-1983) on 23 November 1940.

== Military service ==
He served in the Australian Army with the 32nd Battalion.

== Death ==
He died at Werribee, Victoria on 23 March 1983.
