= Fred Buttsworth (cricketer, born 1880) =

Australian cricketer

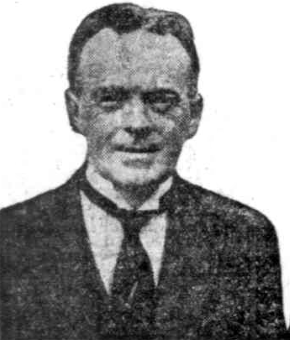

Personal information
- Full name: Frederick Richard Buttsworth
- Born: 28 April 1880; Wilberforce, New South Wales, Australia
- Died: 26 February 1974 (aged 93); Perth, Australia
- Source: Cricinfo, 14 July 2017

Fred Buttsworth (28 April 1880 – 26 February 1974) was an Australian cricketer. He played seven first-class matches for Western Australia between 1920/21 and 1925/26.

His sons, Wally and Fred, were also both talented Australian rules footballers and cricketers.

== See also ==
- List of Western Australia first-class cricketers
