= Ray Houston =

Australian rules footballer

Personal information
- Full name: Ray Houston
- Born: 1 June 1933; Sydney
- Died: 18 September 2018 (aged 85); Belmont, New South Wales
- Original team: Eastern Suburbs
- Height: 188 cm (6 ft 2 in)
- Weight: 85 kg (187 lb)
- Position: Ruck / Defence

Playing career^{1}
Years	Club	Games (Goals)
1952–55	St Kilda	34 (4)
- ^{1} Playing statistics correct to the end of 1955.

Ray Houston (1 June 1933 – 18 September 2018) was an Australian rules footballer who played with St Kilda in the Victorian Football League (VFL).
