= Ivan Goodingham =

Australian rules footballer

Personal information
- Full name: Ivan Goodingham
- Born: 8 January 1926
- Died: 24 April 2016 (aged 90)
- Original team: Mordialloc Juniors
- Height: 191 cm (6 ft 3 in)
- Weight: 91 kg (201 lb)
- Position: Follower

Playing career^{1}
| Years | Club | Games (Goals) |
| 1946–49 | Essendon | 36 (37) |
- ^{1} Playing statistics correct to the end of 1949.

Ivan Goodingham (8 January 1926 – 24 April 2016) was an Australian rules footballer who played for Essendon in the Victorian Football League (VFL) during the late 1940s.

From Mordialloc Juniors, Goodingham started out at Essendon in 1946. A left footed follower, he played as a forward pocket in the 1947 Grand Final which they lost to Carlton. He had a solid season that year, kicking 21 goals.

== Balance ==
- Ivan Goodingham's playing statistics from AFL Tables
- Holmesby, Russell and Main, Jim (2007). The Encyclopedia of AFL Footballers. 7th ed. Melbourne: Bas Publishing.
- Ivan Goodingham's obituary
