= Fred Davies (footballer, born 1921) =

Australian rules footballer

Personal information
- Full name: Frederick James Davies
- Nickname: Mulga
- Born: 14 August 1921; Seaford, Victoria
- Died: 13 August 1961 (aged 39)
- Original team: Seaford (MPFL)
- Height: 187 cm (6 ft 2 in)
- Weight: 88 kg (194 lb)

Playing career^{1}
Years	Club	Games (Goals)
1941, 1946–52	Carlton	125 (137)
- ^{1} Playing statistics correct to the end of 1952.

Career highlights
- Carlton premiers, 1947

Frederick James "Mulga" Davies (14 August 1921 – 13 August 1961) was an Australian rules footballer who played in the Victorian Football League (VFL).

== Family ==
The son of William Phillip Davies (1884–1983), and Marian Davies (1885–1963), née Thompson, Frederick James Davies was born at Seaford, Victoria on 14 August 1921.

He married Joan Mason in 1948, and was the father of the famous Tasmanian dual Olympic basketballer Ian Davies (1956–2013).

== Football ==
Davies played as both a follower and key position forward.

=== Carlton ===
Cleared to Carlton from Seaford Football Club in April 1941, he made his senior debut for Carlton on 2 August 1941, in the Round 14 match against Hawthorn; and, having enlisted in the Second AIF, he did not play again until he returned from overseas service in 1946. He kicked four goals in the 1947 VFL Grand Final, in which Carlton defeated Essendon by a point.

In 1949 Davies played for Victoria against New South Wales.

=== Longford ===
Fred Davies was appointed captain-coach of Longford Football Club in the Northern Tasmanian Football Association (NTFA) in 1953.

He played in 105 games as Lonford's playin-coach from 1953 to 1960. Longford won the competition's premiership in 1955, 1957, and 1958 and, also, won the Tasmanian State Premiership in 1957.

"[Davies'] importance in the history of the Longford Football Club was emphasised when he was selected as captain-coach and first ruckman in the club's official 'Team of the Century'."

=== Tasmanian Football Hall of Fame ===
In 2010 he was inducted into the Tasmanian Football Hall of Fame.

== Military service ==
He enlisted in the Second AIF on 11 October 1941, served overseas, and was formally discharged on 18 July 1946.

== Death ==
He died at his Seaford home on 13 August 1961, the eve of his fortieth birthday.

== See also ==
- Tasmanian Football Hall of Fame
