= Jim Clark (Australian footballer) =

Australian rules footballer

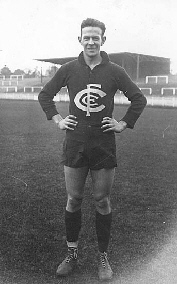
- Clark in 1944

Personal information
- Full name: James Clark
- Born: 24 March 1925; Kyneton Victoria
- Died: 17 August 2013 (aged 88); Echuca, Victoria
- Original team: Elmore, Victoria
- Height: 178 cm (5 ft 10 in)
- Weight: 76 kg (168 lb)

Playing career^{1}
Years	Club	Games (Goals)
1943–1951	Carlton	161 (2)
- ^{1} Playing statistics correct to the end of 1951.

Career highlights
- Carlton best and fairest: 1951; Carlton premiership played: 1945 and 1947

James Clark (24 March 1925 – 17 August 2013) was an Australian rules footballer for Carlton in the Victorian Football League (VFL).

Clark made his VFL debut in round 7, 1943 against Melbourne Football Club at Carlton's home ground Princes Park, and played in two premiership teams; the infamous 1945 "Bloodbath" Grand Final against South Melbourne, and the one-point victory against Essendon in 1947 in which he was generally considered Carlton's best player on the ground for his strong defensive and dashing rebound play in the backline. Clark won Carlton's best and fairest award in 1951 and promptly retired from VFL football to accept the captain-coach role with Bendigo Football League's Echuca Football Club.

Clark represented Victoria five times.
