= Noel Allanson =

Australian rules footballer and cricketer (1925–2022)

- Born: Noel Laurence Allanson; 25 December 1925; North Carlton, Victoria
- Died: 7 February 2022 (aged 96); East Malvern, Victoria
Australian rules football career
Personal information
- Original team: North Essendon
- Height: 179 cm (5 ft 10 in)
- Weight: 76 kg (168 lb)
Playing career^{1}
Years	Club	Games (Goals)
1947–1951	Essendon (VFL)	57 (1)
1951–1952	Williamstone (VFA)	28 (1)
Total		82 (2)
- ^{1} Playing statistics correct to the end of 1951.
Career highlights
- • Essendon First XVIII 1947 Grand Final Team • VFL premiership player: 1950
- Cricket career

Cricket information
- Batting: Right-handed

Domestic team information
- Years: Team
- 1956/57: Victoria
- Only FC: 22 January 1957 Victoria v Tasmania

Career statistics
Competition	First-class
Matches	1
Runs scored	24
Batting average	24.00
100s/50s	0/0
Top score	24
Catches/stumpings	1/–
- Source: CricketArchive, 7 August 2025

Noel Laurence Allanson (25 December 1925 – 7 February 2022) was an Australian rules footballer who played with Essendon in the Victorian Football League (VFL).

== Family ==
The son of Laurence Alexander Allanson (1898–1987) and Eva Charlotte Allanson (1900–1975), née Syer, Noel Laurence Allanson was born at North Carlton, Victoria, on Christmas Day (25 December) 1925.

He married Betty Grace Walton on 13 March 1951 at Essendon North, Victoria.

== Military service ==
Prior to his sporting career, Allanson served as an able seaman in the Royal Australian Navy during the later stages of World War II; he was present in Tokyo Bay in 1945 when the Japanese surrender was signed aboard the United States Navy battleship USS Missouri.

== Football ==
=== Essendon (VFL) ===
Allanson was an Essendon local, and at the end of his debut season he played in the 1947 VFL Grand Final. Essendon lost the game, but he got another chance to play in a premiership in 1950, this time finishing on the winning team.

He was a defender and kicked the only goal of his career at Glenferrie Oval against Hawthorn.

=== Williamstown (VFA) ===
During 1951, Allanson transferred to Williamstown in the VFA and played 26 games over two seasons, kicking one goal and winning the club's most effective player award in 1952, as well as the Williamstown Chronicle best player award.

== Cricket ==
In 1957, Allanson played a first-class cricket match for Victoria against Tasmania, making 24 in his only innings.

== Club official ==
Allanson was vice-president of Essendon Football Club in 1976 and 1977 and treasurer from 1978 to early 1991. He was inducted into the club's Hall of Fame in 2015.

== Death ==
Noel Allanson died at East Malvern, Victoria, on 7 February 2022, at the age of 96, and was the last surviving member of the 1950 Essendon premiership team.
