= Vin Gardiner =

Australian rules footballer

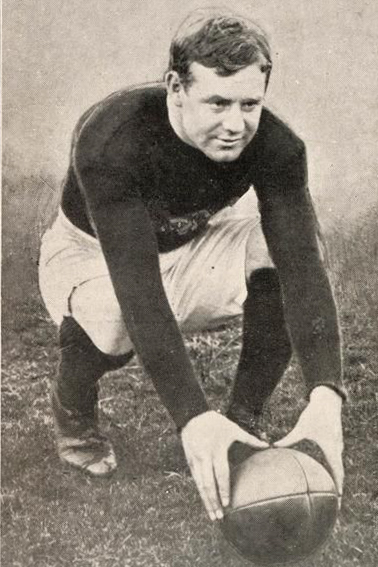
- Gardiner in 1910

Personal information
- Full name: Vincent Sidley Gardiner
- Born: 23 October 1885; Carlton, Victoria
- Died: 3 October 1972 (aged 86); Carlton North, Victoria
- Height: 167 cm (5 ft 6 in)
- Weight: 67.5 kg (149 lb)

Playing career^{1}
Years	Club	Games (Goals)
1905	Melbourne	2 (0)
1907–1917	Carlton	157 (341)
Total		159 (341)
- ^{1} Playing statistics correct to the end of 1917.

Vincent Sidley Gardiner (23 October 1885 – 3 October 1972) was an Australian rules footballer who played for Melbourne and Carlton in the Victorian Football League (VFL).

Gardiner came from a footballing family, his father John had played for Carlton, and his brother Jack also played for Melbourne and Carlton.

Gardiner began his career with Melbourne, but only played two games for the Redlegs in 1905. Gardiner then made his debut for the Carlton Football Club in round 3 of the 1907 season. In his second season, 1908, Gardiner was part of Carlton's premiership winning team. He was also the club's leading goalkicker that season. Gardiner went on to win Carlton's leading goalkicker award six more times and win another premiership, in 1915. He left the Blues at the end of the 1917 season.

Early in 1918 Gardiner joined the hundreds of thousands of other Australians who had enlisted to serve in World War I. While training at Broadmeadows Army camp, his instructors described him as "steady and reliable," "capable and attentive" and "keen and hard-working", but the war ended before Gardiner was called up for active duty.

Gardiner was made a life member of Carlton in 1949. He also played cricket for Carlton, appearing in 109 first XI matches between 1905/06 and 1923/24.
