= Murray Dimble =

Australian rules footballer

Personal information
- Full name: Murray Dimble
- Born: 8 December 1922
- Died: 24 August 2003 (aged 80)
- Original team: Moonee Imperials
- Height: 180 cm (5 ft 11 in)
- Weight: 83 kg (183 lb)

Playing career^{1}
| Years | Club | Games (Goals) |
| 1942, 1944–45 | Essendon | 20 (17) |
| 1946–47 | St Kilda | 17 (13) |
| Total | | 37 (30) |
- ^{1} Playing statistics correct to the end of 1947.

Murray Dimble (8 December 1922 – 24 August 2003) was an Australian rules footballer who played with Essendon and St Kilda in the Victorian Football League (VFL).
