= Paul Schmidt (footballer) =

Australian rules footballer (1917–1961)

Personal information
- Full name: Paul Bernard Schmidt
- Born: 23 April 1917; Korumburra, Victoria
- Died: 17 June 1961 (aged 44); South Melbourne, Victoria
- Original team: Princes Hill
- Height: 178 cm (5 ft 10 in)
- Weight: 79 kg (174 lb)

Playing career^{1}
Years	Club	Games (Goals)
1937–1944	Carlton	78 (228)
- ^{1} Playing statistics correct to the end of 1944.

Paul Bernard Schmidt (23 April 1917 – 17 June 1961) was an Australian rules footballer who played with Carlton in the VFL.

Schmidt was a half forward, he topped Carlton goalkicking every season from 1940 to 1942. His best season tally came in 1941 when he managed 77 goals, including 11 in Carlton's Round 16 game against St Kilda. He was a premiership player in 1938 and missed the 1943 season due to military commitments.

Schmidt moved to Tasmania to captain-coach the Devonport Football Club in the North West Football Union in 1945.

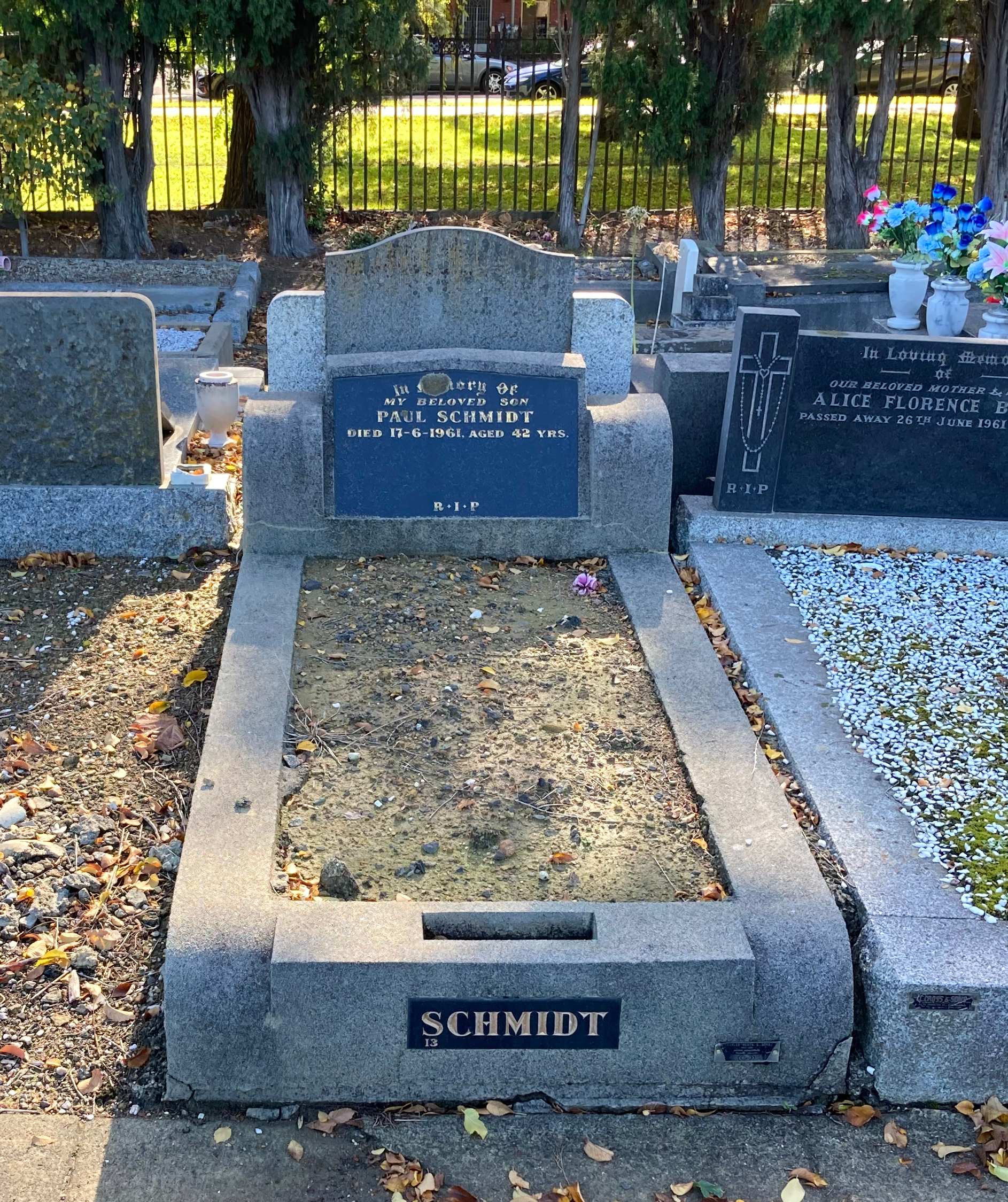
Schmidt's grave at Melbourne General Cemetery

He died on 17 June 1961, and was buried at Melbourne General Cemetery.
