= George Bailey (footballer) =

Australian rules footballer, born 1919

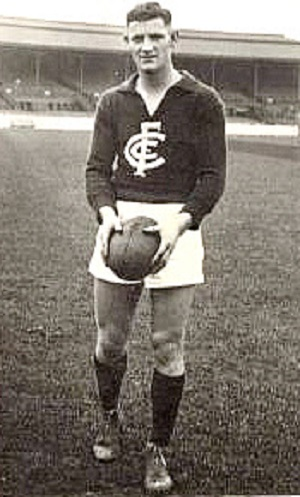
- Bailey in 1941

Personal information
- Full name: George Allan Bailey
- Born: 5 July 1919; Perth, Western Australia
- Died: 30 June 1998 (aged 78)
- Original team: Perth
- Height: 180 cm (5 ft 11 in)
- Weight: 81 kg (179 lb)
- Position: Defender

Playing career^{1}
Years	Club	Games (Goals)
1941–42, 1947–48	Carlton	58 (12)
- ^{1} Playing statistics correct to the end of 1948.

Career highlights
- VFL premiership player: 1947

George Allan Bailey (5 July 1919 – 30 June 1998) was an Australian rules footballer who played for Carlton in the Victorian Football League (VFL) during the 1940s. He also played with Perth in the West Australian National Football League (WANFL).

Bailey was a defender and had two stints with Carlton, the first started in 1941 when he came over from Perth on a war permit. He did not play in 1943 and 1944 due to wartime commitments and he returned to Perth in 1945 and won a Sandover Medal that season. The following year he did not play any football as he was awaiting a clearance back to Carlton and when he got it he joined Carlton in time for the 1947 season. He played in the back pocket in the 1947 VFL Grand Final and ended up in the premiership team with his side downing Essendon by one point.

He spent the final years of his career at Perth, including a stint as coach, to finish with a total of 110 games for the club and is a member of their official 'Team of the Century'.
