= Jack Bennett (footballer, born 1920) =

Australian rules footballer

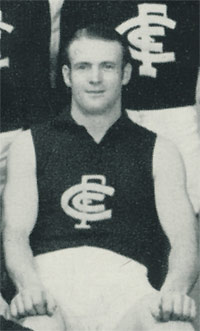
- Bennett in 1940

Personal information
- Born: 21 June 1920; Northcote, Victoria
- Died: 26 May 1997 (aged 76)
- Original team: Camberwell (VFA)
- Debut: Round 4, 1940, Carlton vs. Melbourne, at Princes Park
- Height: 184 cm (6 ft 0 in)
- Weight: 96 kg (212 lb)

Playing career^{1}
Years	Club	Games (Goals)
1940–1947	Carlton	119 (46)
- ^{1} Playing statistics correct to the end of 1947.

Jack Bennett (21 June 1920 – 26 May 1997) was an Australian rules footballer who played for Carlton in the Victorian Football League (VFL) during the 1940s.

From the eastern suburbs, Bennett played in the Eastern Suburban Football Association until 1937, then joined Camberwell in the Victorian Football Association in 1938. He played for Camberwell for two years, and attracted the attention of five VFL clubs, before signing with Carlton for the 1940 season.

Bennett played eight seasons with Carlton as a member of the ruck and with his solid build liked to crash his way through packs. He played in Carlton's 1945 premiership team and was one of the best afield in their 1947 premiership in which he helped out in defence. The 1947 VFL Grand Final was the final VFL game of his career. He became a life member of the club after giving eight years of service.

After leaving Carlton, Bennett moved to Tasmania. He was captain-coach of Cooee in the North Western Football Union in 1948, and captain and assistant coach of North Launceston in the Northern Tasmanian Football Association in 1949, leading the team to the State Premiership that year. He then played for Clarence in the Tasmanian Australian National Football League from 1950 until 1952, also coaching the side in 1950 and coaching the seconds in 1952.
