= Paul Standfield =

Australian rules footballer, born 1916

Personal information
- Full name: Paul Standfield
- Born: 20 October 1916
- Died: 5 October 2003 (aged 86)
- Original team: Fish Creek
- Height: 183 cm (6 ft 0 in)
- Weight: 76 kg (168 lb)

Playing career^{1}
| Years | Club | Games (Goals) |
| 1936–40 | Footscray | 42 (14) |
- ^{1} Playing statistics correct to the end of 1940.

Paul Standfield (20 October 1916 – 5 October 2003) was an Australian rules footballer who played with Footscray in the Victorian Football League (VFL).
