= Noel O'Brien (Australian footballer) =

Australian rules footballer

Personal information
- Full name: Noel Charles O'Brien
- Born: 9 January 1933
- Died: 15 May 1989 (aged 56)
- Original team: Echuca
- Debut: Round 1, 1954, Carlton vs. South Melbourne, at Lake Oval
- Height: 182 cm (6 ft 0 in)
- Weight: 81 kg (179 lb)

Playing career^{1}
Years	Club	Games (Goals)
1954–1955	Carlton	32 (118)
- ^{1} Playing statistics correct to the end of 1955.

Noel Charles O'Brien (9 January 1933 – 15 May 1989) was an Australian rules footballer in the Victorian Football League.

O'Brien made his debut for the Carlton Football Club in the Round 1 of the 1954 season. He sustained a season-ending injury and retired from the game in 1955.
