= Fred Buttsworth =

Australian rules footballer and cricketer (1927–2021)

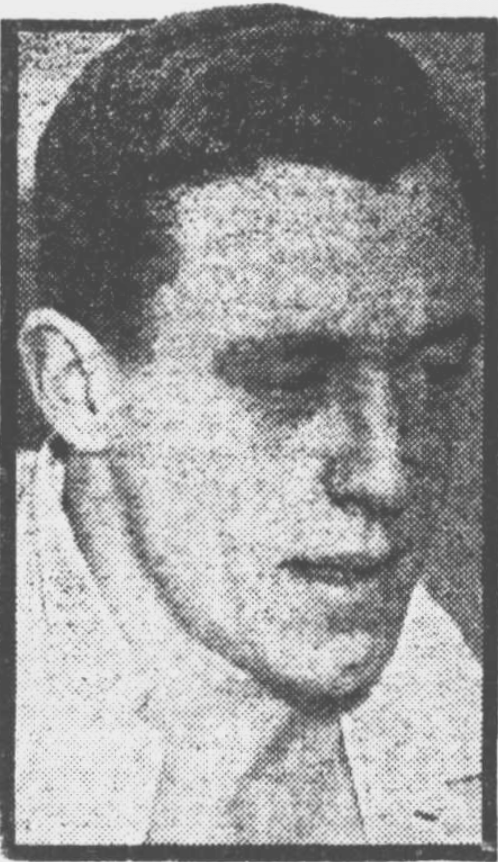

Personal information
- Full name: Frederick James Buttsworth
- Born: 29 May 1927; North Perth, Western Australia
- Died: 11 May 2021 (aged 93)
- Height: 180 cm (5 ft 11 in)
- Weight: 79 kg (174 lb)

Playing career^{1}
Years	Club	Games (Goals)
1942–1953	West Perth	182 (264)
1945	Essendon	8 (9)
- ^{1} Playing statistics correct to the end of 1953.

Career highlights
- West Perth premiership player (1942, 1949, 1951); West Perth best and fairest (1944, 1951); Sandover Medal (1951); Simpson Medal (1951); West Australian Football Hall of Fame (2004)

Frederick James Buttsworth (29 May 1927 – 11 May 2021) was an Australian rules footballer who played for West Perth in the Western Australian National Football League (WANFL) and briefly for Essendon in the Victorian Football League (VFL). He was the younger brother of footballer Wally Buttsworth. Their father Fred Buttsworth (1880 –1974) played first-class cricket for Western Australia in the 1920s.

Buttsworth started his career with West Perth during the Second World War and was their best and fairest winner in 1944. He joined the navy in 1945 and was posted in Melbourne which gave him a chance to play in the VFL with Essendon, playing eight games and kicking nine goals.

In 1946 he returned to West Perth and established himself as one of the best centre half backs in the competition. He was a member of premiership sides in 1949 and again in 1951 when he won another best and fairest as well as a Sandover Medal.

Buttsworth regularly represented Western Australia at interstate football, winning a Simpson Medal for his performance in the 1951 Carnival. He also represented his state at cricket, appearing in eight first class matches from 1947–48 to 1949–50.

He was just 25 years of age when he retired, finishing with a tally of 182 WANFL games. Buttsworth died at the age of 93 on 11 May 2021.
