= Jack Conley (Australian rules footballer) =

Australian rules footballer (1920–2008)

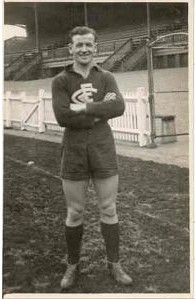
- Conley in 1945

Personal information
- Born: 18 October 1920
- Died: 7 July 2008 (aged 87)
- Original team: Coburg (VFA)
- Debut: Round 12, 1944, Carlton
- Height: 173 cm (5 ft 8 in)
- Weight: 79 kg (174 lb)

Playing career^{1}
Years	Club	Games (Goals)
1944–1952	Carlton	135 (104)
- ^{1} Playing statistics correct to the end of 1952.

Jack Conley (18 October 1920 – 7 July 2008) was an Australian rules footballer in the Victorian Football League (VFL).
