= Herb Turner (Australian footballer) =

Australian rules footballer

Personal information
- Full name: William Herbert Turner
- Born: 6 July 1921; Woodvale, Victoria
- Died: 24 February 2002 (aged 80); Bendigo
- Original team: West Melbourne
- Debut: Round 1, 1944, Carlton vs. South Melbourne
- Height: 170 cm (5 ft 7 in)
- Weight: 73 kg (161 lb)

Playing career^{1}
Years	Club	Games (Goals)
1944–1949	Carlton	86 (101)
1950	Hawthorn	10 (10)
Total		96 (111)
- ^{1} Playing statistics correct to the end of 1950.

Career highlights
- Carlton Premiers 1945, 1947

William Herbert Turner (6 July 1921 – 24 February 2002) was an Australian rules footballer in the Victorian Football League (VFL).

Nicknamed "Stumpy", Turner was a dual premiership player at Carlton. He could play in the midfield or up forward.

Turner also played first-class cricket with Victoria for whom he was a left-handed batsman and made 96 on debut against Western Australia at the MCG in 1948. In all he made 632 runs in his first-class career at an average of 33.26.

== See also ==
- List of Victoria first-class cricketers
