= Wally Buttsworth =

Australian rules footballer and cricketer

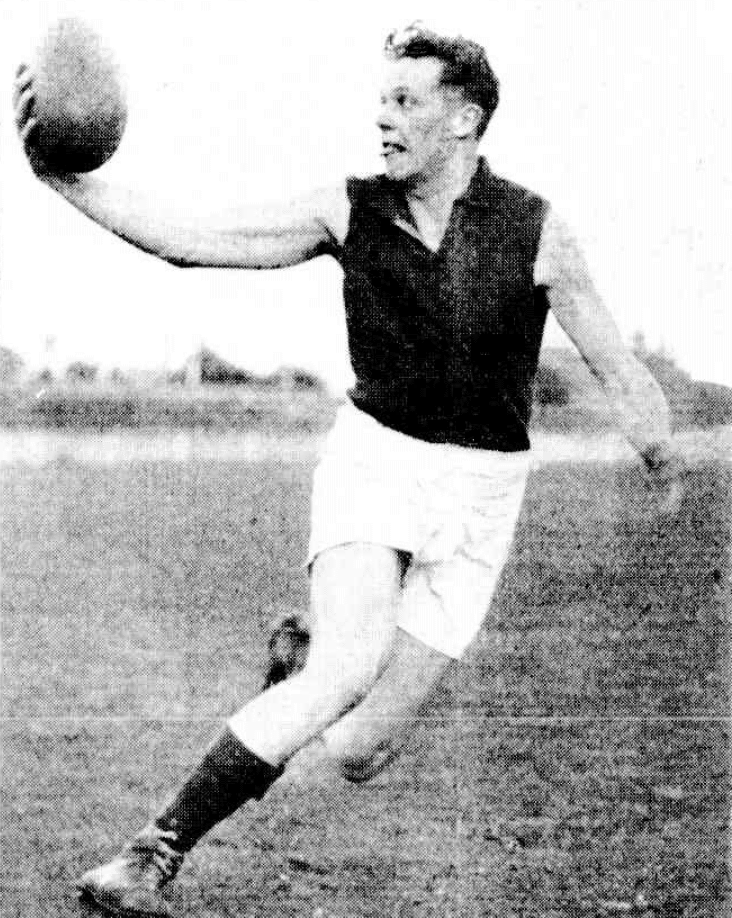

Personal information
- Full name: Wallace Francis Buttsworth
- Born: 21 January 1917; North Perth, Western Australia
- Died: 22 May 2002 (aged 85); Milton, New South Wales
- Height: 185 cm (6 ft 1 in)
- Weight: 91 kg (201 lb)

Playing career^{1}
Years	Club	Games (Goals)
1935–1937	West Perth	51 (10)
1939–1949	Essendon	188 (2)
Total		239 (12)
- ^{1} Playing statistics correct to the end of 1949.

Career highlights
- West Perth premiership player 1935; West Perth best and fairest 1937; Essendon best and fairest 1941, 1945 & 1947; Essendon premiership player 1942 & 1946; Essendon Team of the Century (Centre half-back)

Wallace Francis Buttsworth (21 January 1917 – 22 May 2002) was an Australian rules footballer who played for Essendon in the Victorian Football League (VFL).

== Family ==
Wally had two younger brothers Fred and Brian Buttsworth. Fred Buttsworth was also a cricketer and footballer and winner of the 1951 Sandover Medal. Brian Buttsworth played for West Perth Football Club. Their father, Frederick Richard Buttsworth, was himself a first-class cricketer, playing for Western Australia in the 1920s.

== Football ==
Before he joined Essendon, Buttsworth played for the West Perth Football Club.

A defender, Buttsworth was a best and fairest winner for Essendon on three occasions and played in two VFL premiership teams inn 1942 and 1946. He is the centre half-back in Essendon's 'Team of the Century'. He was broadly considered best on ground in the club's one point 1947 grand final loss against Carlton, taking 25 marks at centre half-back for the game.

== Cricket ==
He represented Western Australia in two first-class cricket matches.

== Champions of Essendon ==
In 2002 an Essendon panel ranked him at 12 in their Champions of Essendon list of the 25 greatest players ever to have played for Essendon.
