= Ritchie Green =

Australian rules footballer

Personal information
- Born: 17 September 1925
- Died: 19 March 1999 (aged 73)
- Original team: East Brunswick
- Height: 170 cm (5 ft 7 in)
- Weight: 73 kg (161 lb)

Playing career^{1}
Years	Club	Games (Goals)
1946–52	Carlton	95 (1)
1953	South Melbourne	2 (0)
Total		97 (1)
- ^{1} Playing statistics correct to the end of 1953.

Career highlights
- Carlton Premiers 1947

Ritchie Green (17 September 1925 – 19 March 1999) was an Australian rules footballer who played for Carlton and South Melbourne in the Victorian Football League (VFL). He went to Camperdown as coach in 1953.
