= Ollie Grieve =

Australian rules footballer

Personal information
- Full name: Oliver Kelvin Grieve
- Born: 30 October 1920
- Died: 2 February 1978 (aged 57)
- Original team: Bacchus Marsh
- Debut: Round 6, 1942, Carlton vs. North Melbourne, at Princes Park
- Height: 183 cm (6 ft 0 in)
- Weight: 82.5 kg (182 lb)

Playing career^{1}
Years	Club	Games (Goals)
1942–1952	Carlton	137 (4)
- ^{1} Playing statistics correct to the end of 1952.

Career highlights
- Carlton best and fairest: 1952; Carlton premiership player: 1947; Eaglehawk Team of the Century: 2005

Oliver Kelvin Grieve (30 October 1920 – 2 February 1978) was an Australian rules footballer in the Victorian Football League (VFL).

Grieve was captain-coach of Eaglehawk in the Bendigo Football League from 1953 to 1955, including the 1953 Bendigo Football League premiership.

Grieve then took up the same role with Irymple in the Sunraysia Football League from 1956 to 195?, which included runners up in 1956.
