= Fred Stafford =

Australian rules footballer

Personal information
- Full name: Frederick Raymond Stafford
- Born: 3 August 1926
- Died: 10 July 2009 (aged 82); Thornbury, Victoria
- Original team: Northcote (VFA)
- Debut: Round 1, 1947, Carlton vs. Melbourne
- Height: 173 cm (5 ft 8 in)
- Weight: 74 kg (163 lb)

Playing career^{1}
Years	Club	Games (Goals)
1947–1952	Carlton	102 (68)
1953–1954	Sorrento	32 (0)
Total		134 (68)
- ^{1} Playing statistics correct to the end of 1952.

Career highlights
- Carlton Premiers 1947 and Sorrento 1953

Frederick Raymond Stafford (3 August 1926 – 10 July 2009), the older brother of George Stafford is a former Australian rules footballer; a talented schoolboy footballer, who played for Northcote in the Victorian Football Association (VFA) in 1945 and 1946, for Carlton in the Victorian Football League (VFL) from 1947 to 1952, and for Sorrento Football Club in the Mornington Peninsula Football League for two seasons including another premiership in 1953.

In his first season with Carlton, in the last few seconds of the 1947 VFL Grand Final against Essendon, the ever-alert and well-trained Stafford, normally a right foot kick, received the ball from a boundary throw-in, and under the most severe time pressure, kicked a goal with his left foot (as the image at right displays), giving Carlton a one-point victory. He soon became one of Carlton's top players, and led the club's best and fairest count in mid-1948 before missing the end of the season with a wrist injury.

On leaving Carlton at the end of 1952, he played for MPFL club Sorrento for two seasons in the 1953, and 1954 seasons, in 32 senior games, including the 1953 premiership. The only surviving photograph for the 1953 season was taken at Sorrento oval during the last home and away match. The framed photograph is entitled "Finals Squad" as it includes several players who did not play in the grand final such as Ken Provan. Sam Wilson and Fred Stafford are dressed in suits. Both were either injured or resting. Another version of the photograph includes the trainers. Fred was a member of the combined Mornington District team that took part in the first-ever Victorian Country Football League championship, held at Ballarat, in July 1954.

Stafford also played basketball, and was a regular in the Victorian state team until the Victorian Basketball Association forbade professional players to ensure it remained eligible for the Olympic games. Stafford later played in a Victorian Footballers team which lost a 1954 exhibition match against the Harlem Globetrotters at Kooyong Stadium. Outside sports, Stafford worked as an electrician.
