= Bert Deacon =

Australian rules footballer and coach

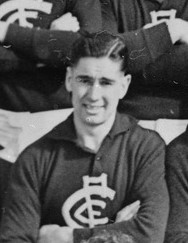

Personal information
- Full name: Bertrand John Deacon
- Born: 8 November 1921; Preston, Victoria
- Died: 3 January 1974 (aged 52); Balnarring, Victoria
- Original team: Preston
- Height: 180 cm (5 ft 11 in)
- Weight: 79 kg (174 lb)
- Position: Defender

Playing career^{1}
Years	Club	Games (Goals)
1940-1941, 1945, 1952-1953	Preston	72 (44)
1942–1951	Carlton	106 (7)
Total		178 (51)
- ^{1} Playing statistics correct to the end of 1951.

Career highlights
- 1947 Brownlow medalist

Bertrand John Deacon (8 November 1921 – 3 January 1974) was an Australian rules footballer who played for Carlton in the Victorian Football League (VFL). He is remembered for being Carlton's first ever Brownlow Medal winner.

Initially a centreman, Deacon began his senior career at Preston in the Victorian Football Association. Carlton signed Deacon in March 1941, one day before his residential address in Preston, which had previously been unallotted, became part of Fitzroy's zone. He joined the army during World War II, and from 1942 until 1945 played most of his football for services teams, including acting as captain-coach of an Army stores team that won all ten games in a 1945 services competition in Darwin. However, he also made his league debut with Carlton and played eight games between 1942 and 1944 whenever he was stationed in Melbourne.

Deacon returned permanently to Melbourne in mid-1945. He played a few games for Preston, then was cleared to and Carlton and played there permanently for the next seven years. Adept at all key positions, he quickly established himself at centre half back with Carlton. He was a premiership player for Carlton in 1945 and 1947, and in the latter in a year which he won the Brownlow Medal and shared Carlton's best and fairest medal with his captain Ern Henfry. He was the first Carlton player to win the award.

Deacon was held in extremely high regard throughout the league for his quality key position play in the years immediately following the war. In 1945, despite having played only half of the season, the Age sportswriter Percy Beames lauded Deacon's "great versatility and sustained brilliance through each game", and said he was perhaps the best key player since the early days of Laurie Nash. Deacon was also noted as a very fair player, and one of the few remembered for gentlemanly behaviour in the notoriously violent 1945 VFL Grand Final – when he helped his 17-year-old opponent Ron Clegg, who had been concussed in a behind-the-play incident, first to face the right direction to take a free kick, then to protect him from joining the outbreaking violence.

Deacon struggled with injuries in his last couple of years with Carlton. He left Carlton after the 1951 season, Deacon returned to Preston as captain-coach. He retired as a player after 1953, and continued as non-playing coach until the end of 1956. He later served as Carlton vice-president and club secretary.

He is the centre half back in Carlton's official 'Team of the Century', and was one of the inaugural players elevated to Legend status in the Carlton Football Club Hall of Fame in 1997.

Off the field, Deacon worked for many years for long-serving VFL and Carlton president Sir Kenneth Luke.

Deacon died of a heart attack at age 52 on 3 January 1974 while on holiday at Balnarring despite the desperate efforts of his Preston team-mate, Pat Foley, to revive him.
