= Ray Garby =

Australian rules footballer

Personal information
- Full name: Raymond Joseph Garby
- Born: 16 January 1923
- Died: 15 March 2009 (aged 86); Rosebud, Victoria
- Original team: Cohuna/Assumption College
- Debut: Round 1, 1946, Carlton vs. South Melbourne, at Junction Oval
- Height: 179 cm (5 ft 10 in)
- Weight: 83.5 kg (184 lb)

Playing career^{1}
Years	Club	Games (Goals)
1946–1950	Carlton	85 (123)
- ^{1} Playing statistics correct to the end of 1950.

Career highlights
- Premiership Player : 1947; Club Leading Goalkicker 1948 equal 39 goals

Raymond Joseph Garby (16 January 1923 – 15 March 2009) was an Australian rules footballer who played with Carlton in the Victorian Football League (VFL).

== Family ==
The son of Samuel George Garby (1887-1959), and Mary Elizabeth Garby (1912-2007), née Bailey, Raymond Joseph Garby was born on 16 January 1923.

He married Jean Foley (1924-2012) in 1947.

== Death ==
He died on 15 March 2009.
