= Whannell =

Whannell is a surname. Notable people with the surname include:

- Dan Whannell (1899–1929), former Australian rules footballer
- Leigh Whannell (born 1977), Australian screenwriter, actor, film producer and film director
