= Dan Whannell =

Australian rules footballer

Personal information
- Full name: Dan Whannell
- Born: 10 April 1899
- Died: 22 July 1929 (aged 30)
- Original team: Carlton District
- Height: 173 cm (5 ft 8 in)
- Weight: 73 kg (161 lb)

Playing career^{1}
Years	Club	Games (Goals)
1921–23	Carlton	14 (2)
- ^{1} Playing statistics correct to the end of 1923.

Dan Whannell (10 April 1899 – 22 July 1929) was an Australian rules footballer who played with Carlton in the Victorian Football League (VFL).
