= List of Hawthorn Football Club players =

This is a list of Hawthorn Football Club players who have made one or more appearance in the Australian Football League (AFL), known as the Victorian Football League (VFL) until 1990. Hawthorn entered the VFL in 1925.

== Men's players ==
Key
| Order | Players are listed in order of debut |
| Seasons | Includes Hawthorn only careers and seasons span from when they played their first and last games. |
| Games | Statistics are for VFL/AFL regular season and finals series matches played at Hawthorn. |
| Goals | Statistics are for VFL/AFL regular season and finals series matches played at Hawthorn. |
| ^{^} | Currently listed players. |
| † | Inducted into the Australian Football Hall of Fame. |

As of the end of 2026

=== 1920s ===
| Order | Player | Season(s) | Games | Goals |
|---|---|---|---|---|
| 1 | Paddy Burke | 1925–1926 | 31 | 13 |
| 2 | Dave Elliman | 1925 | 3 | 5 |
| 3 | Fred Finch | 1925–1927 | 37 | 10 |
| 4 | Jack Gill | 1925–1928 | 40 | 9 |
| 5 | Gil Hendrie | 1925–1927 | 17 | 9 |
| 6 | Jim Jackson | 1925–1926 | 22 | 1 |
| 7 | Jim McCashney | 1925–1927 | 46 | 7 |
| 8 | Stan McKenzie | 1925 | 17 | 0 |
| 9 | Cyril Nott | 1925–1926 | 18 | 1 |
| 10 | Bert Officer | 1925 | 12 | 6 |
| 11 | Arthur Pearson | 1925 | 6 | 2 |
| 12 | Jack Pickford | 1925–1928 | 55 | 3 |
| 13 | Bob Sellers | 1925–1934 | 98 | 65 |
| 14 | Clem Splatt | 1925–1927 | 20 | 1 |
| 15 | Ern Utting | 1925–1932 | 101 | 28 |
| 16 | Reg Whitehead | 1925 | 1 | 0 |
| 17 | Les Woodford | 1925 | 13 | 20 |
| 18 | Hec Yeomans | 1925 | 15 | 16 |
| 19 | Les Carbarns | 1925 | 12 | 2 |
| 20 | Wal Williams | 1925–1927 | 17 | 7 |
| 21 | Bert Calwell | 1925–1927 | 29 | 3 |
| 22 | Pat Keary | 1925–1930 | 61 | 1 |
| 23 | Clarrie Lethlean | 1925–1927 | 43 | 18 |
| 24 | Fred Brown | 1925–1926 | 4 | 0 |
| 25 | Syd James | 1925 | 2 | 0 |
| 26 | Mick Ennis | 1925–1927 | 19 | 42 |
| 27 | Jack Price | 1925 | 10 | 2 |
| 28 | Roy Donovan | 1925–1926 | 9 | 1 |
| 29 | George Bolt | 1925 | 8 | 0 |
| 30 | Lew Gough | 1925; 1932 | 12 | 17 |
| 31 | Bert McComb | 1925; 1928–1929 | 18 | 2 |
| 32 | Bert Hyde | 1925–1935 | 129 | 269 |
| 33 | Pat Kennedy | 1925 | 3 | 1 |
| 34 | Martin Larkin | 1925–1926 | 4 | 0 |
| 35 | Jack Jobson | 1926 | 1 | 0 |
| 36 | Frank Maple | 1926 | 2 | 1 |
| 37 | Dan Minogue† | 1926 | 1 | 2 |
| 38 | Frank Murphy | 1926–1928 | 28 | 20 |
| 39 | Ted Pool | 1926–1938 | 200 | 230 |
| 40 | Stuart Stewart | 1926–1935 | 130 | 34 |
| 41 | Lindsay Beck | 1926 | 2 | 0 |
| 42 | Tom Everuss | 1926 | 17 | 0 |
| 43 | Jack Francis | 1926 | 6 | 8 |
| 44 | Dick Logan | 1926–1930 | 58 | 35 |
| 45 | Charlie Whitely | 1926 | 1 | 1 |
| 46 | Jack Drake | 1926 | 3 | 1 |
| 47 | Frank Donnellan | 1926 | 3 | 2 |
| 48 | Bill Henry | 1926–1927 | 8 | 5 |
| 49 | Phil Sullivan | 1926 | 7 | 1 |
| 50 | Bill Brown | 1926; 1928 | 12 | 0 |
| 51 | Horrie Bullen | 1926 | 2 | 0 |
| 52 | Ivan Corry | 1926; 1932 | 6 | 2 |
| 53 | Bernie Trafford | 1926–1927 | 4 | 2 |
| 54 | Leo McCulloch | 1926 | 1 | 0 |
| 55 | Alec Crozier | 1926–1927 | 4 | 0 |
| 56 | Alby Millard | 1926 | 1 | 0 |
| 57 | George Arnott | 1927 | 10 | 0 |
| 58 | Fred Barker | 1927–1929 | 29 | 3 |
| 59 | Jim Sinclair | 1927 | 6 | 5 |
| 60 | Harry Townley | 1927 | 2 | 0 |
| 61 | Charlie Sherer | 1927–1929 | 32 | 1 |
| 62 | Norm Wells | 1927 | 2 | 0 |
| 63 | Jack Boothman | 1927 | 2 | 0 |
| 64 | Bob Hammond | 1927–1928; 1931–1933 | 34 | 14 |
| 65 | Clarrie Lonsdale | 1927–1937 | 109 | 22 |
| 66 | Reg Naylor | 1927 | 5 | 3 |
| 67 | Addis Priestley | 1927 | 2 | 0 |
| 68 | Frank Thomas | 1927 | 10 | 4 |
| 69 | Ron Black | 1927; 1929 | 17 | 0 |
| 70 | George Graham | 1927 | 1 | 1 |
| 71 | Pat Murphy | 1927–1928 | 7 | 1 |
| 72 | Jack Sharpley | 1927–1932 | 41 | 1 |
| 73 | Len Maxwell | 1927 | 3 | 0 |
| 74 | Phil Manning | 1927 | 2 | 1 |
| 75 | Godfrey McRae | 1927 | 1 | 0 |
| 76 | Clarrie Answerth | 1928–1929 | 18 | 3 |
| 77 | Tom Barwick | 1928 | 2 | 2 |
| 78 | Bill Browne | 1928 | 5 | 0 |
| 79 | Ralph Goullet | 1928 | 14 | 6 |
| 80 | Frank Magrath | 1928 | 1 | 0 |
| 81 | Bert Sutton | 1928 | 15 | 3 |
| 82 | Roly Tasker | 1928–1929 | 21 | 10 |
| 83 | Fred Lester | 1928 | 1 | 0 |
| 84 | Willie Woolf | 1928; 1931 | 10 | 0 |
| 85 | Rob Brady | 1928 | 4 | 1 |
| 86 | Merv Yelland | 1928 | 2 | 1 |
| 87 | Rolland Fairley | 1928 | 12 | 1 |
| 88 | Syd Hayhow | 1928 | 6 | 0 |
| 89 | Les Hughson | 1928 | 4 | 3 |
| 90 | Archie Leitch | 1928 | 4 | 0 |
| 91 | Harry Mort | 1928–1929 | 7 | 2 |
| 92 | Stan Petrie | 1928 | 3 | 3 |
| 93 | Allan Chandler | 1928–1929; 1931–1932 | 55 | 9 |
| 94 | Wally Lathlain | 1928–1930 | 17 | 0 |
| 95 | Dermot O'Brien | 1928 | 5 | 0 |
| 96 | Fred West | 1928–1929 | 12 | 3 |
| 97 | Dave Withers | 1928–1930 | 11 | 18 |
| 98 | Bert Ashby | 1928–1929; 1931–1935 | 25 | 6 |
| 99 | Gilbert Chandler | 1928 | 1 | 0 |
| 100 | Arthur Bryse | 1929 | 14 | 0 |
| 101 | Bill Carey | 1929–1932 | 59 | 6 |
| 102 | Albert Chadwick† | 1929 | 17 | 8 |
| 103 | Bill Hudd | 1929–1930 | 26 | 5 |
| 104 | Maurie Mahony | 1929 | 10 | 3 |
| 105 | Matt Wilkins | 1929 | 2 | 0 |
| 106 | Len Yemm | 1929–1930 | 26 | 7 |
| 107 | Frank Horne | 1929–1930 | 10 | 1 |
| 108 | John O'Halloran | 1929 | 1 | 0 |
| 109 | Les Jones | 1929 | 5 | 0 |
| 110 | Donald Mills | 1929; 1931 | 15 | 0 |
| 111 | Jack Ryan | 1929–1933 | 70 | 142 |
| 112 | Lyall Williams | 1929–1930 | 24 | 0 |
| 113 | George Cathie | 1929–1930 | 20 | 1 |
| 114 | Les Meade | 1929–1931 | 24 | 0 |
| 115 | Frank Whitty | 1929–1930 | 11 | 11 |
| 116 | Jim Francis | 1929–1933 | 61 | 26 |
| 117 | Richard Williams | 1929 | 1 | 0 |
| 118 | Arthur Watson | 1929 | 2 | 0 |

=== 1930s ===
| Order | Player | Season(s) | Games | Goals |
|---|---|---|---|---|
| 119 | George Bennett | 1930–1933; 1942–1944 | 92 | 9 |
| 120 | John Harris | 1930–1931 | 34 | 10 |
| 121 | Bennie Lunn | 1930 | 10 | 0 |
| 122 | Bert Mills | 1930–1942 | 196 | 60 |
| 123 | Len Mills | 1930 | 8 | 17 |
| 124 | Ernie Sheil | 1930 | 5 | 0 |
| 125 | Arthur Mills | 1930 | 10 | 1 |
| 126 | Jim Veitch | 1930 | 4 | 0 |
| 127 | Mark Daffey | 1930–1933 | 37 | 26 |
| 128 | Reg Mulavin | 1930 | 11 | 0 |
| 129 | Wally Ware | 1930–1934 | 63 | 27 |
| 130 | Jack Flanigan | 1930 | 5 | 1 |
| 131 | Fred Hansen | 1930 | 1 | 0 |
| 132 | Reg Davies | 1930–1931 | 3 | 0 |
| 133 | Artie Frecker | 1930 | 1 | 0 |
| 134 | Leo Murphy | 1930–1940 | 132 | 22 |
| 135 | Keith Sharpley | 1930–1933 | 54 | 40 |
| 136 | Phil Brooks | 1931 | 2 | 2 |
| 137 | Ted Garside | 1931 | 6 | 0 |
| 138 | Jack O'Brien | 1931 | 1 | 0 |
| 139 | Stan Fisher | 1931–1932 | 20 | 1 |
| 140 | Frank Stewart | 1931 | 4 | 0 |
| 141 | Norm Collins | 1931–1933 | 31 | 0 |
| 142 | Alex Stewart | 1931 | 9 | 1 |
| 143 | Irvan Williams | 1931 | 1 | 0 |
| 144 | Rupe Dodd | 1931 | 3 | 4 |
| 145 | Ern Aitchison | 1931 | 2 | 0 |
| 146 | Bert Chandler | 1931; 1933–1935 | 48 | 24 |
| 147 | Dick Chandler | 1931 | 2 | 5 |
| 148 | Cliff Colling | 1931 | 1 | 1 |
| 149 | Stan Spinks | 1931–1941 | 143 | 19 |
| 150 | Harvey Johnson | 1932 | 14 | 2 |
| 151 | Frank Luckins | 1932 | 1 | 0 |
| 152 | Alec Morgan | 1932 | 1 | 0 |
| 153 | Bob Murdoch | 1932–1933 | 20 | 6 |
| 154 | Alan Story | 1932; 1935; 1942–1944 | 15 | 5 |
| 155 | Hilton Buckney | 1932 | 11 | 3 |
| 156 | Keith Fleming | 1932 | 1 | 0 |
| 157 | Joe Meehan | 1932 | 5 | 0 |
| 158 | Dan Moloney | 1932–1934 | 23 | 0 |
| 159 | Lachlan Cameron | 1932–1934 | 28 | 9 |
| 160 | Allan Quartermain | 1932 | 2 | 0 |
| 161 | Stuart Russell | 1932 | 7 | 2 |
| 162 | Syd Francis | 1932 | 2 | 0 |
| 163 | Bob Williams | 1932; 1934–1944 | 136 | 110 |
| 164 | Frank Aked Sr. | 1933 | 8 | 2 |
| 165 | Bert Carey | 1933; 1937 | 10 | 16 |
| 166 | Geoff Farrelly | 1933 | 2 | 1 |
| 167 | Alex Lee | 1933–1935 | 31 | 1 |
| 168 | Ernie Loveless | 1933–1936 | 56 | 1 |
| 169 | Roy Rodda | 1933–1935 | 34 | 31 |
| 170 | Jack Zander | 1933–1934; 1937 | 14 | 13 |
| 171 | Bruce Scharp | 1933 | 1 | 0 |
| 172 | Bill Twomey Sr. | 1933–1934 | 10 | 0 |
| 173 | Tom Mercer | 1933 | 2 | 0 |
| 174 | Steve Bravo | 1933–1936 | 31 | 12 |
| 175 | Laurence Cordner | 1933 | 1 | 1 |
| 176 | Leo Clements | 1933–1934 | 7 | 0 |
| 177 | Charlie McGillivray | 1933 | 3 | 0 |
| 178 | Fred Sayer | 1933–1934 | 7 | 4 |
| 179 | George Dower | 1933–1940 | 100 | 17 |
| 180 | Norm Hillard | 1933; 1936–1937 | 32 | 57 |
| 181 | Jack White | 1933 | 1 | 0 |
| 182 | Neil Allison | 1934; 1936–1939 | 34 | 2 |
| 183 | Mal Drury | 1934 | 15 | 12 |
| 184 | Bill Ford | 1934–1937 | 56 | 38 |
| 185 | Jack Green | 1934–1936 | 40 | 167 |
| 186 | Wal Romari | 1934 | 2 | 0 |
| 187 | Wally Williamson | 1934 | 12 | 1 |
| 188 | Fred De Abel | 1934 | 1 | 0 |
| 189 | Ivan McAlpine | 1934–1937 | 67 | 27 |
| 190 | Alan Fuller | 1934–1935 | 23 | 2 |
| 191 | Brian Geary | 1934 | 3 | 1 |
| 192 | Frank Nolan | 1934 | 2 | 2 |
| 193 | Harold Turner | 1934 | 1 | 0 |
| 194 | Jerry McAuliffe | 1934 | 10 | 1 |
| 195 | Stan Ogden | 1934 | 5 | 1 |
| 196 | Viv Randall | 1934–1938 | 73 | 4 |
| 197 | Dick Abikhair | 1934–1938 | 60 | 10 |
| 198 | Ken Onley | 1934 | 3 | 1 |
| 199 | Merv Wickham | 1934 | 1 | 0 |
| 200 | Gerry Hickey | 1934–1935 | 7 | 4 |
| 201 | Max Smethurst | 1935 | 3 | 0 |
| 202 | Alf Hurley | 1935–1938 | 36 | 60 |
| 203 | Carl Rohde | 1935 | 4 | 0 |
| 204 | Ralph Duff | 1935 | 1 | 1 |
| 205 | Alf Giblett | 1935 | 9 | 0 |
| 206 | Vin Smith | 1935 | 11 | 11 |
| 207 | Tom Byrne | 1935–1939 | 61 | 70 |
| 208 | Ted Williams | 1935 | 4 | 0 |
| 209 | Harold Maskell | 1935–1936 | 8 | 2 |
| 210 | Jack Aitchison | 1935 | 1 | 0 |
| 211 | Tom Green | 1935 | 3 | 2 |
| 212 | Alby De Luca | 1936 | 10 | 9 |
| 213 | Bill Ripper | 1936 | 10 | 15 |
| 214 | Jack Mitchell | 1936 | 7 | 0 |
| 215 | Frank Asling | 1936 | 2 | 1 |
| 216 | Jack Stenhouse | 1936 | 1 | 0 |
| 217 | Eddie Shea | 1936–1937 | 12 | 0 |
| 218 | Jack Clements | 1936–1937 | 7 | 6 |
| 219 | Alf Neeson | 1936–1938 | 34 | 41 |
| 220 | Alec Albiston | 1936–1942; 1945–1949 | 170 | 383 |
| 221 | Harold Albiston | 1936–1940 | 62 | 0 |
| 222 | Jim Oakes | 1936 | 4 | 1 |
| 223 | Bill Seedsman | 1936 | 1 | 0 |
| 224 | Max McQueen | 1937 | 1 | 0 |
| 225 | Len Walsh | 1937, 1940, 1942 | 15 | 14 |
| 226 | Jack Barker | 1937–1945 | 113 | 21 |
| 227 | Alf Clay | 1937 | 3 | 2 |
| 228 | Bill Pavey | 1937–1945 | 100 | 7 |
| 229 | Bill Deague | 1937–1939 | 43 | 35 |
| 230 | Frank Samblebe | 1937–1940; 1943 | 53 | 1 |
| 231 | Max Wheeler | 1937 | 1 | 0 |
| 232 | Gordon Waters | 1937–1941 | 32 | 0 |
| 233 | Ralph Taylor | 1937 | 2 | 0 |
| 234 | Charlie Pierce | 1937–1939 | 17 | 13 |
| 235 | Ken Feltscheer | 1937–1940; 1943 | 43 | 15 |
| 236 | Gilbert Cartwright | 1938 | 7 | 12 |
| 237 | Alby Naismith | 1938–1943 | 68 | 85 |
| 238 | Will Taylor | 1938 | 1 | 0 |
| 239 | George Carter | 1938–1940 | 33 | 25 |
| 240 | Andy Angwin | 1938–1944 | 75 | 10 |
| 241 | Bill Moore | 1938–1941 | 31 | 11 |
| 242 | Morton Wright | 1938 | 1 | 0 |
| 243 | Bill Robinson | 1938–1939 | 6 | 3 |
| 244 | Allan Hird Sr. | 1938–1939 | 14 | 12 |
| 245 | Jim Bohan | 1938–1946 | 131 | 145 |
| 246 | Ron Paternoster | 1938 | 1 | 0 |
| 247 | Johnny Hall | 1938 | 2 | 7 |
| 248 | Joe Lyons | 1938 | 1 | 0 |
| 249 | George Barker | 1939 | 1 | 0 |
| 250 | Jack Burke | 1939–1945 | 74 | 83 |
| 251 | Arthur Davidson | 1939 | 7 | 19 |
| 252 | Len Thomas | 1939 | 16 | 15 |
| 253 | Jack Blackman | 1939–1940; 1944–1946 | 87 | 14 |
| 254 | Howard Day | 1939 | 3 | 6 |
| 255 | Les Pabst | 1939–1941, 1944–1948 | 94 | 12 |
| 256 | Tom Sutherland | 1939–1941 | 19 | 17 |
| 257 | Frank Booth | 1939 | 3 | 2 |
| 258 | Charlie Van Der Bist | 1939–1940 | 7 | 7 |
| 259 | Tom Wellington | 1939–1940 | 14 | 3 |
| 260 | Gus Young | 1939–1940 | 10 | 5 |
| 261 | Harry Jacobs | 1939 | 2 | 1 |
| 262 | Tom Davey | 1939 | 2 | 0 |
| 263 | Russ Elliott | 1939, 1941–1942 | 9 | 4 |

=== 1940s ===
| Order | Player | Season(s) | Games | Goals |
|---|---|---|---|---|
| 264 | Reg Bell | 1940–1941 | 23 | 0 |
| 265 | Dudley Bragg | 1940–1941; 1944–1945 | 44 | 1 |
| 266 | Jack Carmody | 1940–1944; 1946 | 64 | 46 |
| 267 | Vin Doherty | 1940 | 5 | 13 |
| 268 | Bruce Hone | 1940 | 5 | 3 |
| 269 | Wally Culpitt | 1940–1944; 1946–1948 | 125 | 116 |
| 270 | Max Carmichael | 1940 | 2 | 3 |
| 271 | Kevin Curran | 1940; 1946–1951 | 85 | 9 |
| 272 | Ern Elder | 1940–1941 | 12 | 0 |
| 273 | Roy Long | 1940 | 2 | 0 |
| 274 | Col Austen | 1940–1941; 1943; 1946–1949 | 85 | 0 |
| 275 | Brendan Brady | 1940–1941 | 8 | 7 |
| 276 | Reg Farrant | 1940 | 5 | 1 |
| 277 | Alan Barelli | 1940–1942 | 18 | 16 |
| 278 | Wally Bristowe | 1940–1942 | 11 | 4 |
| 279 | Laurie Peters | 1940–1944 | 24 | 0 |
| 280 | Bert Graham | 1940–1942 | 23 | 9 |
| 281 | Kevin Landrigan | 1940 | 1 | 0 |
| 282 | Dick Pirrie | 1940–1941 | 3 | 0 |
| 283 | Jack King | 1941–1945 | 69 | 37 |
| 284 | Phil Ryan | 1941–1946 | 52 | 26 |
| 285 | Kevin Pirrie | 1941; 1946 | 10 | 0 |
| 286 | Jack Brain | 1941–1942; 1946–1948 | 58 | 25 |
| 287 | Frank Cutter | 1941 | 3 | 1 |
| 288 | Ken Dyer | 1941 | 4 | 0 |
| 289 | Bob Herbert | 1941–1942 | 5 | 2 |
| 290 | Alby Hodges | 1941 | 9 | 2 |
| 291 | Fred Jones | 1941–1942 | 13 | 26 |
| 292 | Frank Parker | 1941 | 1 | 0 |
| 293 | Albert Prior | 1941; 1944–1950 | 103 | 258 |
| 294 | Norm Alvin | 1942; 1944 | 6 | 4 |
| 295 | Cecil Austen | 1942 | 5 | 6 |
| 296 | Ron Harris | 1942–1943; 1946 | 22 | 7 |
| 297 | Laurie Taylor | 1942–1944 | 40 | 1 |
| 298 | Jim White | 1942 | 2 | 0 |
| 299 | Barney Jorgensen | 1942 | 4 | 3 |
| 300 | Bob Austen | 1942 | 6 | 1 |
| 301 | Terry Boyle | 1942 | 2 | 0 |
| 302 | Reg Horkings | 1942–1944 | 34 | 2 |
| 303 | Jim Logan | 1942 | 1 | 0 |
| 304 | Leo Connors | 1942 | 2 | 0 |
| 305 | Tom Rowe | 1942 | 4 | 0 |
| 306 | Norm Goss Sr. | 1942–1943 | 8 | 0 |
| 307 | Harold Daly | 1942 | 5 | 0 |
| 308 | Harold Zucker | 1942 | 3 | 3 |
| 309 | Tommy Lahiff | 1942–1944 | 19 | 23 |
| 310 | Jack Mathisen | 1942 | 2 | 0 |
| 311 | Peter O'Donohue | 1942–1943; 1946–1952 | 109 | 24 |
| 312 | Frank Curran | 1942 | 1 | 0 |
| 313 | Alex Nash | 1942 | 1 | 0 |
| 314 | Norm Fletcher | 1943 | 2 | 1 |
| 315 | Jack O'Keefe | 1943–1945 | 33 | 23 |
| 316 | Don Wilks | 1943–1945 | 51 | 3 |
| 317 | George Withers | 1943 | 2 | 0 |
| 318 | Arthur Clements | 1943 | 3 | 2 |
| 319 | Alan Saker | 1943 | 2 | 0 |
| 320 | Stuart Hamilton | 1943–1947 | 58 | 12 |
| 321 | Bert Rogers | 1943–1946 | 30 | 17 |
| 322 | Gordon Goldsmith | 1943 | 5 | 3 |
| 323 | Ken Slater | 1943–1945 | 27 | 20 |
| 324 | Lou Salvas | 1943 | 5 | 7 |
| 325 | Tom Campbell | 1943–1945 | 27 | 12 |
| 326 | Allan Jensen | 1943–1944 | 12 | 3 |
| 327 | Ron Alsop | 1944 | 2 | 0 |
| 328 | Malcolm Worrall | 1944–1950 | 80 | 9 |
| 329 | Andy Brannan | 1944–1946 | 31 | 39 |
| 330 | Harry Dwan | 1944 | 4 | 0 |
| 331 | Reg Barnes | 1944–1945 | 6 | 0 |
| 332 | Ted Fletcher | 1944; 1946–1954 | 129 | 51 |
| 333 | Vic Atkinson | 1944 | 1 | 0 |
| 334 | Bob Harland | 1944 | 1 | 0 |
| 335 | Ken Bodger | 1944–1945 | 12 | 9 |
| 336 | Jim Maguire | 1944–1945 | 6 | 4 |
| 337 | Alvan Whittle | 1944 | 1 | 0 |
| 338 | Bert Amey | 1944 | 3 | 0 |
| 339 | Ken Lippiatt | 1944–1946 | 30 | 0 |
| 340 | Roy Baldwin | 1944–1945; 1948–1950 | 41 | 6 |
| 341 | Tom Spear | 1944–1947 | 30 | 0 |
| 342 | Jack McLeod | 1945–1947; 1950–1951 | 64 | 14 |
| 343 | Neil Pearson | 1945–1954 | 133 | 44 |
| 344 | Keith Shea | 1945 | 8 | 8 |
| 345 | Geoff Barwick | 1945 | 19 | 14 |
| 346 | Bob Furler | 1945 | 6 | 0 |
| 347 | Russell Whelan | 1945 | 1 | 0 |
| 348 | Don McVilly | 1945–1947 | 42 | 20 |
| 349 | Jack Cleary | 1945–1946 | 10 | 4 |
| 350 | Jack Taylor | 1945 | 2 | 0 |
| 351 | Jack Shea | 1945–1947 | 27 | 1 |
| 352 | Noel Hickey | 1945–1947 | 6 | 1 |
| 353 | Phil O'Donohue | 1945–1946 | 6 | 0 |
| 354 | Ted Collis | 1946 | 9 | 12 |
| 355 | Bill Dalkin | 1946–1949 | 38 | 10 |
| 356 | Tom Ferguson | 1946–1948 | 38 | 17 |
| 357 | Ken Munro | 1946–1947 | 6 | 0 |
| 358 | Wally Spencer | 1946 | 13 | 0 |
| 359 | Don Beauvais | 1946 | 7 | 1 |
| 360 | Bob Neate | 1946 | 1 | 0 |
| 361 | Keith Molloy | 1946–1947; 1949 | 12 | 0 |
| 362 | Len Andrews | 1946–1948 | 31 | 5 |
| 363 | Ken Mace | 1946–1947 | 8 | 0 |
| 364 | Geoff Cartledge | 1946–1947 | 7 | 0 |
| 365 | Lionel Johnston | 1946–1950 | 41 | 0 |
| 366 | Tom Calwell | 1946–1947 | 4 | 0 |
| 367 | Kevin Hevey | 1946–1947 | 5 | 0 |
| 368 | Jim Robison | 1947–1953 | 89 | 17 |
| 369 | Len Woolf | 1947–1948 | 16 | 4 |
| 370 | Jack Hester | 1947–1948 | 15 | 15 |
| 371 | Ken Hopper | 1947–1951 | 66 | 9 |
| 372 | Cash Fitzgerald | 1947 | 3 | 0 |
| 373 | Fred Barnes | 1947 | 6 | 0 |
| 374 | Clarrie Swenson | 1947–1949 | 33 | 37 |
| 375 | Jack Fisher | 1947 | 2 | 0 |
| 376 | Gordon Anderson | 1947–1951 | 59 | 70 |
| 377 | Jim Morgan | 1947 | 8 | 1 |
| 378 | Allan Le Nepveu | 1947–1952 | 55 | 11 |
| 379 | Ralph Shalless | 1948–1949 | 17 | 3 |
| 380 | Mel Williams | 1948–1950 | 44 | 18 |
| 381 | George Edwards | 1948–1953 | 36 | 13 |
| 382 | Bob Milgate | 1948 | 10 | 15 |
| 383 | Clive Philp | 1948–1955 | 112 | 23 |
| 384 | Ron Boys | 1948–1949 | 26 | 2 |
| 385 | Jack Marr | 1948–1949; 1951–1953 | 33 | 15 |
| 386 | Bob Fisher | 1948–1950 | 28 | 6 |
| 387 | Leo Bohan | 1949–1951 | 18 | 2 |
| 388 | Lew Evans | 1949 | 2 | 2 |
| 389 | Vic McKinnon | 1949–1952 | 48 | 8 |
| 390 | Fred Wain | 1949–1950; 1952 | 34 | 8 |
| 391 | Allan Baldwin | 1949 | 5 | 0 |
| 392 | Norm Black | 1949–1953 | 55 | 0 |
| 393 | Frank Prowse | 1949–1950 | 20 | 6 |
| 394 | Brian Lambert | 1949 | 5 | 5 |
| 395 | Joe Churchman | 1949 | 3 | 0 |
| 396 | Tom Allsop | 1949–1954 | 58 | 42 |
| 397 | Lance Wilkinson | 1949–1956 | 116 | 18 |
| 398 | Jim Rattray | 1949–1952 | 18 | 4 |

=== 1950s ===
| Order | Player | Season(s) | Games | Goals |
|---|---|---|---|---|
| 399 | Michael Fitchett | 1950–1952 | 30 | 14 |
| 400 | Barry Griffiths | 1950–1952 | 25 | 9 |
| 401 | John Kennedy Sr. | 1950–1959 | 164 | 29 |
| 402 | Peter Scott | 1950 | 2 | 0 |
| 403 | Gordon Bowman | 1950–1951 | 29 | 2 |
| 404 | Peter Hancock | 1950–1952 | 26 | 16 |
| 405 | Herb Turner | 1950 | 10 | 10 |
| 406 | Ron Evans | 1950 | 13 | 11 |
| 407 | Ray Gibb | 1950–1952 | 22 | 3 |
| 408 | Jim Don | 1950 | 5 | 0 |
| 409 | Bill Norman | 1950 | 5 | 0 |
| 410 | Brian Leary | 1950 | 2 | 0 |
| 411 | Ken Newton | 1950–1951 | 9 | 11 |
| 412 | Roy Simmonds | 1950–1961 | 192 | 78 |
| 413 | Jack Hartigan | 1951–1952 | 15 | 8 |
| 414 | Pat Cash Sr. | 1951–1955 | 58 | 75 |
| 415 | Jack MacDonald | 1951–1953 | 33 | 45 |
| 416 | Len Crane | 1951–1955; 1957 | 102 | 1 |
| 417 | John O'Mahony | 1951–1960 | 112 | 28 |
| 418 | Peter Charleston | 1951; 1953 | 6 | 0 |
| 419 | Ian Mathers | 1951; 1953–1954 | 4 | 0 |
| 420 | Dave Morgan | 1951 | 1 | 0 |
| 421 | Phil O'Brien | 1951–1958 | 86 | 71 |
| 422 | Lindsay Turnbull | 1951 | 3 | 0 |
| 423 | Jack Douglas | 1952–1953 | 14 | 0 |
| 424 | Bernard Considine | 1952–1953 | 16 | 7 |
| 425 | Peter Kanis | 1952–1956 | 41 | 11 |
| 426 | Mack Atkins | 1952–1954 | 18 | 9 |
| 427 | Bill Collins | 1952–1953; 1955 | 31 | 22 |
| 428 | John McGreevy | 1952 | 3 | 0 |
| 429 | Noel Webster | 1952 | 8 | 3 |
| 430 | Maurie Considine | 1952–1956 | 37 | 1 |
| 431 | Kevin Bond | 1952 | 1 | 0 |
| 432 | Alf Chown | 1953 | 12 | 3 |
| 433 | Kevin Coghlan | 1953–1956 | 59 | 95 |
| 434 | Graham Peck | 1953–1955 | 29 | 12 |
| 435 | Ian Egerton | 1953–1957 | 56 | 7 |
| 436 | Alf Hughes | 1953–1959 | 107 | 0 |
| 437 | Ian McCann | 1953–1955 | 12 | 3 |
| 438 | John McCashney | 1953–1954 | 4 | 0 |
| 439 | Wally Nash | 1953–1954 | 17 | 18 |
| 440 | Keith White | 1953–1955 | 16 | 7 |
| 441 | Peter Hughes | 1953–1954 | 16 | 1 |
| 442 | Max Jose | 1953–1957 | 25 | 3 |
| 443 | Norm Maginness | 1953–1958 | 64 | 0 |
| 444 | Warren Holyoak | 1954 | 7 | 0 |
| 445 | John Peck | 1954–1966 | 213 | 475 |
| 446 | Noel Voigt | 1954–1960 | 84 | 45 |
| 447 | Allan Woodley | 1954–1959; 1963 | 130 | 56 |
| 448 | Clayton Thompson | 1954–1956 | 50 | 54 |
| 449 | Geoff Howells | 1954–1960 | 59 | 27 |
| 450 | Frank Considine | 1954–1957 | 21 | 1 |
| 451 | Alan Fanning | 1954–1955 | 12 | 6 |
| 452 | Brian Kann | 1954–1959 | 57 | 0 |
| 453 | Graham Arthur† | 1955–1968 | 232 | 201 |
| 454 | Ian Hinks | 1955–1958 | 16 | 3 |
| 455 | Ray Yeoman | 1955–1960 | 74 | 47 |
| 456 | Rod Horrocks | 1955–1956 | 4 | 0 |
| 457 | Brian Boland | 1955 | 6 | 0 |
| 458 | Jeff Harris | 1955 | 1 | 0 |
| 459 | Don Gent | 1955–1959 | 70 | 0 |
| 460 | Alan Jewell | 1955 | 2 | 0 |
| 461 | Ron Hoy | 1955 | 1 | 0 |
| 462 | Barry Takle | 1955 | 4 | 1 |
| 463 | Bill Elsworth | 1955–1956 | 10 | 4 |
| 464 | Leon Toohey | 1955 | 2 | 0 |
| 465 | John Cooper | 1956–1957 | 20 | 17 |
| 466 | Brendan Edwards | 1956–1961; 1963 | 109 | 29 |
| 467 | Les Kaine | 1956–1962 | 103 | 80 |
| 468 | Ian Pearson | 1956 | 5 | 2 |
| 469 | Maurie Young | 1956–1960 | 71 | 59 |
| 470 | George Barton | 1956 | 9 | 0 |
| 471 | Don Douglas | 1956 | 1 | 0 |
| 472 | George Hancock | 1956 | 5 | 5 |
| 473 | Garry Young | 1956–1965 | 108 | 164 |
| 474 | Brian Falconer | 1956–1960 | 57 | 7 |
| 475 | Kevin Northcote | 1956–1957; 1959 | 14 | 6 |
| 476 | Bryan Waters | 1956–1957 | 5 | 1 |
| 477 | Len Carter | 1957 | 1 | 0 |
| 478 | Cyril Collard | 1957–1958 | 13 | 3 |
| 479 | Terry Ingersoll | 1957–1958 | 17 | 36 |
| 480 | Barry Metcalfe | 1957 | 1 | 0 |
| 481 | Geoff Dupuy | 1957 | 1 | 0 |
| 482 | Dave Ritchie | 1957–1959 | 11 | 2 |
| 483 | Bill Shelton | 1957–1959 | 12 | 5 |
| 484 | Ron Cabble | 1957–1962 | 35 | 14 |
| 485 | John Fisher | 1957–1965 | 94 | 9 |
| 486 | Colin Youren | 1958–1965 | 135 | 34 |
| 487 | Garry Rasmussen | 1958–1959 | 7 | 3 |
| 488 | John Dineen | 1958–1960 | 17 | 9 |
| 489 | Ray McVilly | 1958–1960 | 16 | 0 |
| 490 | John Elward | 1958–1960 | 16 | 7 |
| 491 | Bill Hay | 1958 | 4 | 0 |
| 492 | John McArthur | 1958; 1960–1963 | 61 | 10 |
| 493 | Geoff Wilson | 1958–1960 | 31 | 30 |
| 494 | Bob Nisbet | 1958–1959 | 16 | 15 |
| 495 | Ron Nalder | 1959–1966 | 121 | 44 |
| 496 | Brian Coleman | 1959 | 6 | 5 |
| 497 | Sted Hay | 1959–1964 | 78 | 3 |
| 498 | Graham Cooper | 1959–1965 | 90 | 6 |
| 499 | John Robertson | 1959–1960 | 10 | 3 |
| 500 | Barry Toy | 1959–1960 | 9 | 1 |
| 501 | Cam McPherson | 1959–1966 | 104 | 0 |
| 502 | Paul Sullivan | 1959 | 1 | 0 |

=== 1960s ===
| Order | Player | Season(s) | Games | Goals |
|---|---|---|---|---|
| 503 | Malcolm Hill | 1960–1962 | 22 | 6 |
| 504 | John Winneke | 1960–1962 | 50 | 3 |
| 505 | Phil Hay | 1960–1966 | 107 | 20 |
| 506 | Kevin Connell | 1960–1964 | 55 | 64 |
| 507 | Trevor Randall | 1960 | 2 | 0 |
| 508 | Morton Browne | 1960–1962; 1964–1967 | 80 | 107 |
| 509 | Ian Mort | 1960–1964 | 73 | 56 |
| 510 | Bill Cocks | 1960 | 1 | 0 |
| 511 | Ian Law | 1960–1968 | 106 | 115 |
| 512 | Ron Critchley | 1960 | 3 | 0 |
| 513 | Graeme Haslem | 1961–1963 | 8 | 0 |
| 514 | Bill Joiner | 1961–1962 | 13 | 4 |
| 515 | Max McMahon | 1961–1962 | 5 | 1 |
| 516 | Charles Abbott | 1961–1963 | 17 | 1 |
| 517 | Reg Poole | 1961; 1963–1968 | 62 | 0 |
| 518 | Jack Cunningham | 1961–1963 | 17 | 14 |
| 519 | Wayne Athorne | 1961 | 1 | 0 |
| 520 | Alan Joyce | 1961–1965 | 49 | 13 |
| 521 | David Parkin | 1961–1974 | 211 | 21 |
| 522 | Rodney Olsson | 1962–1969 | 116 | 64 |
| 523 | Des Dickson | 1962–1966 | 73 | 31 |
| 524 | Robert Porter | 1962 | 6 | 1 |
| 525 | Norm Watson | 1962–1964 | 10 | 0 |
| 526 | Ken Beck | 1962–1972 | 143 | 23 |
| 527 | David Albiston | 1962–1966 | 61 | 30 |
| 528 | Kevin Woodward | 1962–1964 | 10 | 0 |
| 529 | Duncan Harris | 1962 | 1 | 0 |
| 530 | Peter Lyon | 1963–1964 | 16 | 0 |
| 531 | Kevin Coverdale | 1963–1965 | 50 | 33 |
| 532 | Danny Hegarty | 1963 | 1 | 0 |
| 533 | Ross Growcott | 1963–1970 | 53 | 2 |
| 534 | Graeme McArthur | 1963–1964 | 2 | 0 |
| 535 | Phil Garwood | 1964–1965 | 13 | 0 |
| 536 | Bob Vagg | 1964 | 3 | 0 |
| 537 | Mike Butcher | 1964–1965 | 21 | 5 |
| 538 | Neil Ferguson | 1964–1970 | 82 | 50 |
| 539 | John Dunshea | 1964–1967 | 33 | 17 |
| 540 | Don Roach | 1964–1965 | 29 | 7 |
| 541 | Percy Cummings | 1964–1965 | 5 | 1 |
| 542 | Bob Carroll | 1965 | 4 | 0 |
| 543 | John Tickell | 1965–1966 | 18 | 2 |
| 544 | Bryan Horskins | 1965 | 8 | 4 |
| 545 | Wes Smith | 1965–1967 | 28 | 21 |
| 546 | Bob Keddie | 1965–1972 | 132 | 195 |
| 547 | Peter O'Shea | 1965 | 9 | 10 |
| 548 | John Price | 1965 | 4 | 0 |
| 549 | Mike Demaine | 1965–1966 | 11 | 0 |
| 550 | Norm Gordes | 1965–1967 | 20 | 3 |
| 551 | Daryl Mares | 1965; 1967 | 5 | 4 |
| 552 | Noel Taylor | 1965 | 1 | 0 |
| 553 | Bob Willis | 1965 | 4 | 0 |
| 554 | Greg Burgess | 1965–1966 | 4 | 0 |
| 555 | Phil Wynd | 1965–1967 | 11 | 0 |
| 556 | Peter Crimmins | 1966–1975 | 176 | 231 |
| 557 | John Gardner | 1966–1968 | 42 | 7 |
| 558 | Kevin McLean | 1966–1967 | 17 | 1 |
| 559 | Des Meagher | 1966–1976 | 198 | 96 |
| 560 | Michael Porter | 1966–1967; 1969–1972 | 78 | 59 |
| 561 | Ray Wilson | 1966–1972 | 105 | 32 |
| 562 | Terry Gay | 1966–1970 | 65 | 39 |
| 563 | Phil Lade | 1966–1967 | 15 | 0 |
| 564 | Geoff Stafford | 1966 | 7 | 2 |
| 565 | Richard Browne | 1966–1967; 1969 | 16 | 8 |
| 566 | Bruce Reid | 1966–1967 | 3 | 0 |
| 567 | Rodney Robson | 1966–1967 | 5 | 0 |
| 568 | Ted Johnson | 1966–1969 | 42 | 1 |
| 569 | Vin Crowe | 1967–1968 | 14 | 3 |
| 570 | Ian Bremner | 1967–1976 | 158 | 6 |
| 571 | Peter Hudson† | 1967–1974; 1977 | 129 | 727 |
| 572 | Ray Horkings | 1967–1968 | 11 | 5 |
| 573 | Peter Chilton | 1967–1971 | 37 | 9 |
| 574 | Don Scott† | 1967–1981 | 302 | 133 |
| 575 | Garry Lester | 1967 | 10 | 5 |
| 576 | Norm Smith | 1967 | 5 | 1 |
| 577 | Peter Ryan | 1967 | 1 | 0 |
| 578 | Dennis Jenkins | 1967–1968 | 12 | 0 |
| 579 | Geoff Angus | 1967–1973 | 73 | 35 |
| 580 | Michael Blood | 1967–1970 | 37 | 2 |
| 581 | Dave Leng | 1967 | 1 | 0 |
| 582 | Norm Bussell | 1968–1973 | 113 | 2 |
| 583 | John Fisher | 1968–1970 | 26 | 5 |
| 584 | Jim Smith | 1968 | 4 | 0 |
| 585 | Paul Tolson | 1968–1969 | 9 | 4 |
| 586 | Rochford Devenish-Meares | 1968 | 8 | 1 |
| 587 | Lance Morton | 1968–1970 | 36 | 26 |
| 588 | Glenn Murphy | 1968–1970 | 32 | 6 |
| 589 | Bryan Pleitner | 1968 | 1 | 0 |
| 590 | Kevin Heath | 1968–1975 | 140 | 43 |
| 591 | Michael Francis | 1968–1970 | 7 | 2 |
| 592 | Gene Chiron | 1969–1973 | 37 | 1 |
| 593 | Geoff Smith | 1969–1972 | 38 | 24 |
| 594 | Ron Stubbs | 1969–1972 | 17 | 5 |
| 595 | Bruce Stevenson | 1969–1974 | 72 | 26 |
| 596 | Peter Knights† | 1969–1985 | 264 | 201 |
| 597 | Brian Douge | 1969–1976 | 91 | 8 |
| 598 | Leigh Matthews† | 1969–1985 | 332 | 915 |
| 599 | Lindsay Tipping | 1969–1971 | 12 | 0 |

=== 1970s ===
| Order | Player | Season(s) | Games | Goals |
|---|---|---|---|---|
| 600 | Des Kennedy | 1970 | 4 | 2 |
| 601 | Alan Martello | 1970–1980 | 223 | 164 |
| 602 | Charlie Grummisch | 1970–1974 | 50 | 63 |
| 603 | Les Hawken | 1970–1972; 1974 | 65 | 3 |
| 604 | Stephen Jolley | 1970 | 2 | 0 |
| 605 | Leon Rice | 1970–1979 | 133 | 26 |
| 606 | Brian Shinners | 1970–1972 | 16 | 2 |
| 607 | John Lewis | 1970 | 3 | 0 |
| 608 | Kelvin Moore† | 1970–1984 | 300 | 21 |
| 609 | Robert Day | 1971–1972 | 38 | 12 |
| 610 | Michael Moncrieff | 1971–1983 | 224 | 629 |
| 611 | Ross Johnson | 1971–1972 | 7 | 0 |
| 612 | John Hendrie | 1972–1982 | 197 | 254 |
| 613 | Kelvin Matthews | 1972–1978 | 97 | 99 |
| 614 | Michael Tuck† | 1972–1991 | 426 | 320 |
| 615 | Andrew Scott | 1972–1973 | 6 | 4 |
| 616 | Terry Fitzgerald | 1972 | 1 | 0 |
| 617 | Alan Goad | 1972–1977; 1979–1982 | 138 | 129 |
| 618 | Gerald McCarthy | 1972–1977 | 75 | 18 |
| 619 | Michael Zemski | 1973–1974 | 8 | 1 |
| 620 | Wayne Bevan | 1973–1975 | 20 | 37 |
| 621 | Peter Welsh | 1973–1978 | 79 | 9 |
| 622 | Bohdan Jaworskyj | 1973–1975 | 67 | 3 |
| 623 | Len Petch | 1973; 1975–1977 | 23 | 0 |
| 624 | Geoff Ablett | 1973–1982 | 202 | 135 |
| 625 | Bernie Jones | 1973–1977; 1979–1980 | 73 | 32 |
| 626 | Colin Judd | 1973 | 2 | 0 |
| 627 | Russell Donaldson | 1974 | 2 | 0 |
| 628 | Ian Scrimshaw | 1974–1975 | 19 | 20 |
| 629 | Lou Milner | 1974 | 1 | 0 |
| 630 | Kelvin Steel | 1974–1977 | 19 | 3 |
| 631 | Robert Wilkinson | 1974; 1979–1980 | 17 | 9 |
| 632 | Paul Reinmuth | 1974 | 1 | 0 |
| 633 | Ron Beattie | 1974 | 9 | 0 |
| 634 | Gerry Lynn | 1974–1975 | 3 | 0 |
| 635 | Alle De Wolde | 1975–1982 | 97 | 14 |
| 636 | Glenn Harrison | 1975–1976 | 10 | 1 |
| 637 | Barry Rowlings | 1975–1978 | 82 | 78 |
| 638 | Stuart Trott | 1975–1977 | 41 | 17 |
| 639 | David Polkinghorne | 1975–1984 | 164 | 10 |
| 640 | Robert DiPierdomenico† | 1975; 1978–1991 | 240 | 130 |
| 641 | Shane Murphy | 1975–1978 | 14 | 15 |
| 642 | Michael Cooke | 1975 | 2 | 4 |
| 643 | Peter Murnane | 1976–1981 | 80 | 56 |
| 644 | David O'Halloran | 1976–1979; 1981–1985 | 160 | 19 |
| 645 | Ian Paton | 1976–1985 | 155 | 47 |
| 646 | Graeme Spark | 1976 | 2 | 3 |
| 647 | Peter Bennett | 1976–1977 | 13 | 5 |
| 648 | Don Fletcher | 1976–1977 | 7 | 2 |
| 649 | Rodney Eade | 1976–1987 | 229 | 46 |
| 650 | Richard Walter | 1977–1980 | 20 | 18 |
| 651 | Kevin Ablett | 1977; 1979–1980 | 31 | 22 |
| 652 | Norm Goss Jr. | 1978–1982 | 81 | 123 |
| 653 | Jeff Murray | 1978 | 10 | 3 |
| 654 | Terry Wallace† | 1978–1986 | 174 | 96 |
| 655 | Michael McCarthy | 1978–1981; 1983–1986 | 99 | 65 |
| 656 | Warren Lee | 1978 | 6 | 2 |
| 657 | Tony King | 1978–1980 | 12 | 7 |
| 658 | Nick Wilton | 1978–1981 | 13 | 7 |
| 659 | Peter Russo | 1978–1988 | 162 | 102 |
| 660 | Mark Scott | 1978; 1980 | 3 | 8 |
| 661 | Gary Ayres† | 1978–1993 | 269 | 70 |
| 662 | Steve Emery | 1978–1979 | 6 | 0 |
| 663 | Brendan McFaull | 1979 | 2 | 1 |
| 664 | Terry Moore | 1979–1980 | 21 | 10 |
| 665 | John Kennedy Jr. | 1979–1991 | 241 | 210 |
| 666 | Robert Polkinghorne | 1979–1980 | 5 | 0 |
| 667 | Mark Turner | 1979–1983 | 35 | 6 |

=== 1980s ===
| Order | Player | Season(s) | Games | Goals |
|---|---|---|---|---|
| 668 | Andy Bennett | 1980; 1982–1983 | 21 | 18 |
| 669 | Colin Robertson | 1980–1986 | 116 | 62 |
| 670 | Russell Greene | 1980–1988 | 184 | 82 |
| 671 | Chris Mew | 1980–1992 | 230 | 21 |
| 672 | Dale Foster | 1980 | 3 | 0 |
| 673 | Robert Mace | 1980–1981 | 7 | 7 |
| 674 | Peter Schwab | 1980–1991 | 171 | 38 |
| 675 | Rick Davies† | 1981 | 20 | 37 |
| 676 | Paul Considine | 1981, 1983, 1985 | 7 | 5 |
| 677 | Craig Hoyer | 1981–1982 | 2 | 0 |
| 678 | Glenn Howard | 1981–1983; 1986 | 23 | 3 |
| 679 | Kim Kershaw | 1981–1982 | 4 | 0 |
| 680 | Scott Wade | 1981–1983 | 12 | 4 |
| 681 | Gary Buckenara | 1982–1990 | 154 | 293 |
| 682 | Richard Loveridge | 1982–1989 | 136 | 119 |
| 683 | Gary Ablett Sr.† | 1982 | 6 | 10 |
| 684 | Michael Byrne | 1982–1986 | 90 | 97 |
| 685 | Robert Dutton | 1982 | 1 | 0 |
| 686 | Dermott Brereton† | 1982–1992 | 189 | 427 |
| 687 | Ken Judge | 1983–1986 | 72 | 158 |
| 688 | Peter Curran | 1983–1990 | 109 | 196 |
| 689 | Russell Shields | 1983–1984 | 17 | 15 |
| 690 | Chris Langford† | 1983–1997 | 303 | 33 |
| 691 | David Flintoff | 1983 | 1 | 0 |
| 692 | Grant Fowler | 1983–1984 | 2 | 0 |
| 693 | Stephen Allender | 1984 | 2 | 1 |
| 694 | Russell Morris | 1984–1988; 1990 | 93 | 52 |
| 695 | Rod Lester-Smith | 1984–1987 | 70 | 23 |
| 696 | Paul Abbott | 1984–1989; 1991 | 85 | 30 |
| 697 | James Bennett | 1984–1985 | 7 | 4 |
| 698 | James Morrissey | 1984; 1987–1993 | 106 | 100 |
| 699 | Shane McGrath | 1984 | 1 | 1 |
| 700 | Steve Malaxos | 1985 | 9 | 15 |
| 701 | Jason Dunstall† | 1985–1998 | 269 | 1254 |
| 702 | Robert Handley | 1985–1987 | 23 | 18 |
| 703 | Greg Dear | 1985–1990; 1992–1993 | 137 | 18 |
| 704 | John Platten† | 1986–1997 | 258 | 228 |
| 705 | David Sullivan | 1986 | 1 | 0 |
| 706 | Chris Wittman | 1986–1992 | 89 | 61 |
| 707 | Roger Ellingworth | 1986 | 1 | 0 |
| 708 | Ray Jencke | 1986–1997 | 194 | 27 |
| 709 | Tony Symonds | 1987 | 3 | 1 |
| 710 | Andrew Collins | 1987–1996 | 212 | 37 |
| 711 | Paul Harding | 1987–1988 | 11 | 2 |
| 712 | Darrin Pritchard | 1987–1997 | 211 | 94 |
| 713 | Anthony Condon | 1987–1997 | 145 | 49 |
| 714 | Paul Dear | 1987; 1989–1996 | 123 | 80 |
| 715 | Robbie Dickson | 1988–1990 | 17 | 12 |
| 716 | Tony Hall | 1988–1993 | 97 | 144 |
| 717 | Scott Maginness | 1988–1996 | 131 | 8 |
| 718 | Steven Lawrence | 1988–1998 | 146 | 30 |
| 719 | Andy Demetriou | 1988 | 3 | 1 |
| 720 | Andrew Gowers | 1988–1994 | 89 | 54 |
| 721 | Dean Anderson | 1988–1992 | 83 | 74 |
| 722 | Sean Ralphsmith | 1988; 1990 | 4 | 3 |
| 723 | Lawrence Bingham | 1989–1990 | 3 | 0 |
| 724 | Matthew Bourke | 1989 | 1 | 0 |
| 725 | Greg Madigan | 1989–1994 | 40 | 4 |

=== 1990s ===
| Order | Player | Season(s) | Games | Goals |
|---|---|---|---|---|
| 726 | Paul Hudson | 1990–1996 | 134 | 264 |
| 727 | Paul Cooper | 1990–1996 | 81 | 9 |
| 728 | Stephen Rennie | 1990–1994 | 98 | 72 |
| 729 | Alex McDonald | 1990–1995 | 46 | 24 |
| 730 | Glenn Nugent | 1990–1994 | 24 | 11 |
| 731 | Darren Jarman† | 1991–1995 | 109 | 122 |
| 732 | Matthew Robran | 1991 | 7 | 5 |
| 733 | Greg Whittlesea | 1991 | 4 | 0 |
| 734 | Michael Johnston | 1991–1993 | 8 | 4 |
| 735 | Jason Taylor | 1992–1996 | 80 | 30 |
| 736 | Austin McCrabb | 1992 | 9 | 1 |
| 737 | Ricky Nixon | 1992–1993 | 8 | 6 |
| 738 | Domenic Berry | 1992 | 1 | 0 |
| 739 | Phillip Murton | 1992; 1994 | 7 | 2 |
| 740 | Richard Taylor | 1992–1993; 1995–2000 | 112 | 46 |
| 741 | Darren Baxter | 1993–1994 | 27 | 2 |
| 742 | Shane Crawford† | 1993–2008 | 305 | 224 |
| 743 | Mark Graham | 1993–2004 | 223 | 61 |
| 744 | Tim Allen | 1993–1994 | 11 | 4 |
| 745 | Mark Bunn | 1993–1995 | 23 | 1 |
| 746 | Scott Crow | 1993–1995 | 13 | 2 |
| 747 | Simon Crawshay | 1994–1996 | 19 | 2 |
| 748 | Paul Barnard | 1994–1995 | 11 | 4 |
| 749 | Nick Holland | 1994–2005 | 179 | 239 |
| 750 | Rayden Tallis | 1994–2004 | 163 | 27 |
| 751 | Tim Hargreaves | 1994–1996 | 42 | 57 |
| 752 | Matthew Young | 1994–1995 | 21 | 6 |
| 753 | Shayne Stevenson | 1994–1997 | 34 | 30 |
| 754 | Luke McCabe | 1995–2004 | 138 | 12 |
| 755 | Simon Minton-Connell | 1995–1996 | 22 | 33 |
| 756 | Jonathon Robran | 1995–1999 | 75 | 6 |
| 757 | Tony Woods | 1995–2002 | 142 | 26 |
| 758 | Shannon Gibson | 1995–1997 | 25 | 18 |
| 759 | Randall Bone | 1995–1998 | 16 | 4 |
| 760 | Daniel Harford | 1995–2003 | 153 | 67 |
| 761 | Daniel Chick | 1996–2002 | 149 | 159 |
| 762 | Darren Kappler | 1996–1998 | 41 | 27 |
| 763 | Craig Treleven | 1996–2000 | 78 | 22 |
| 764 | Leon Higgins | 1996 | 1 | 0 |
| 765 | Kane Fraser | 1996–1998 | 5 | 0 |
| 766 | Brendan Krummel | 1996–2000 | 64 | 47 |
| 767 | Paul Salmon† | 1996–2000 | 100 | 41 |
| 768 | Jade Rawlings | 1996–2003 | 116 | 62 |
| 769 | Angelo Lekkas | 1996–2005 | 180 | 120 |
| 770 | Justin Crawford | 1997–1998 | 29 | 21 |
| 771 | Jon Hassall | 1997–1999 | 44 | 5 |
| 772 | Aaron Lord | 1997–2001 | 93 | 136 |
| 773 | Brad Scott | 1997 | 22 | 6 |
| 774 | Ben Dixon | 1997–2007 | 203 | 282 |
| 775 | Todd Ridley | 1997 | 2 | 0 |
| 776 | Jonathan Hay | 1997–2005 | 149 | 12 |
| 777 | John Barker | 1998–2006 | 113 | 114 |
| 778 | Nathan Chapman | 1998; 2000 | 16 | 4 |
| 779 | Trent Croad | 1998–2001; 2004–2008 | 184 | 129 |
| 780 | Brad Lloyd | 1998–1999 | 11 | 3 |
| 781 | Nathan Thompson | 1998–2004 | 119 | 192 |
| 782 | Haydon Kilmartin | 1998 | 10 | 1 |
| 783 | Nathan Turvey | 1998–1999 | 10 | 0 |
| 784 | Matthew Dennis | 1998–1999 | 5 | 0 |
| 785 | Chris Obst | 1998–2001 | 17 | 0 |
| 786 | Richie Vandenberg | 1998–2007 | 145 | 64 |
| 787 | Kris Barlow | 1999–2004 | 102 | 74 |
| 788 | Michael Collica | 1999–2000 | 30 | 4 |
| 789 | Adrian Cox | 1999, 2001–2004 | 54 | 27 |
| 790 | Brett O'Farrell | 1999; 2001 | 13 | 6 |
| 791 | Joel Smith | 1999–2007 | 163 | 39 |
| 792 | Anthony Rock | 1999–2001 | 44 | 17 |
| 793 | Glen Bowyer | 1999–2001 | 35 | 14 |

=== 2000s ===
| Order | Player | Season(s) | Games | Goals |
|---|---|---|---|---|
| 794 | Barry Young | 2000 | 13 | 0 |
| 795 | Chance Bateman | 2000–2012 | 177 | 67 |
| 796 | Luke McPharlin | 2000–2001 | 12 | 3 |
| 797 | Steven Rode | 2000 | 1 | 0 |
| 798 | Lance Picioane | 2000–2004 | 58 | 24 |
| 799 | Brett Johnson | 2000–2003 | 38 | 10 |
| 800 | Tim Clarke | 2001–2008 | 96 | 39 |
| 801 | Shaun Rehn | 2001–2002 | 33 | 7 |
| 802 | Steven Greene | 2001–2005 | 42 | 11 |
| 803 | Matthew Dent | 2001 | 8 | 0 |
| 804 | Nathan Lonie | 2001–2005 | 64 | 35 |
| 805 | Bill Nicholls | 2001 | 6 | 5 |
| 806 | Tim Hazell | 2001 | 5 | 3 |
| 807 | Michael Osborne | 2001–2013 | 163 | 107 |
| 808 | Mark Williams | 2002–2009 | 111 | 242 |
| 809 | Simon Cox | 2002–2003 | 35 | 17 |
| 810 | Nick Stone | 2002–2003 | 17 | 0 |
| 811 | Nick Ries | 2002–2006 | 81 | 18 |
| 812 | Robert Campbell | 2002–2009 | 116 | 25 |
| 813 | Luke Hodge† | 2002–2017 | 305 | 193 |
| 814 | Sam Mitchell† | 2002–2016 | 307 | 67 |
| 815 | Campbell Brown | 2002–2010 | 159 | 64 |
| 816 | David Loats | 2002–2003 | 11 | 3 |
| 817 | Peter Everitt | 2003–2006 | 72 | 67 |
| 818 | Ben Kane | 2003–2006 | 23 | 1 |
| 819 | Rick Ladson | 2003–2011 | 115 | 43 |
| 820 | Kingsley Hunter | 2003 | 2 | 1 |
| 821 | Simon Beaumont | 2004–2005 | 27 | 12 |
| 822 | Danny Jacobs | 2004–2007 | 45 | 6 |
| 823 | Brad Sewell | 2004–2014 | 200 | 32 |
| 824 | Matthew Ball | 2004–2006 | 17 | 2 |
| 825 | Luke Brennan | 2004–2006 | 19 | 11 |
| 826 | Lance Franklin | 2005–2013 | 182 | 580 |
| 827 | Harry Miller | 2005–2006 | 18 | 13 |
| 828 | Josh Thurgood | 2005–2007 | 13 | 1 |
| 829 | Jordan Lewis | 2005–2016 | 264 | 145 |
| 830 | Jarryd Roughead | 2005–2019 | 283 | 578 |
| 831 | Simon Taylor | 2005–2010 | 85 | 16 |
| 832 | Tim Boyle | 2005–2008 | 31 | 39 |
| 833 | Bo Nixon | 2005 | 1 | 0 |
| 834 | Clinton Young | 2005–2012 | 116 | 60 |
| 835 | Zac Dawson | 2005–2006 | 14 | 0 |
| 836 | Tom Murphy | 2005–2012 | 95 | 5 |
| 837 | Grant Birchall | 2006–2019 | 248 | 34 |
| 838 | Brent Guerra | 2006–2013 | 159 | 25 |
| 839 | Ben McGlynn | 2006–2009 | 44 | 28 |
| 840 | Max Bailey | 2006–2013 | 43 | 10 |
| 841 | Beau Dowler | 2006–2009 | 16 | 11 |
| 842 | Stephen Gilham | 2006–2012 | 98 | 4 |
| 843 | Xavier Ellis | 2007–2013 | 86 | 28 |
| 844 | Garry Moss | 2007–2010 | 14 | 12 |
| 845 | Mitch Thorp | 2007–2009 | 2 | 1 |
| 846 | Matt Little | 2007 | 1 | 0 |
| 847 | Travis Tuck | 2007–2009 | 20 | 1 |
| 848 | Stuart Dew | 2008–2009 | 26 | 20 |
| 849 | Cyril Rioli | 2008–2018 | 189 | 275 |
| 850 | Cameron Stokes | 2008–2010 | 20 | 8 |
| 851 | Josh Kennedy | 2008–2009 | 13 | 4 |
| 852 | Jarryd Morton | 2008–2010 | 22 | 12 |
| 853 | Brent Renouf | 2008–2011 | 45 | 5 |
| 854 | Ryan Schoenmakers | 2009–2018 | 121 | 51 |
| 855 | Matt Suckling | 2009–2015 | 102 | 51 |
| 856 | Brendan Whitecross | 2009–2018 | 111 | 45 |
| 857 | Beau Muston | 2009–2010 | 13 | 8 |
| 858 | Liam Shiels | 2009–2022 | 255 | 90 |
| 859 | Shane Savage | 2009–2013 | 56 | 37 |
| 860 | Riley Milne | 2009–2011 | 2 | 0 |

=== 2010s ===
| Order | Player | Season(s) | Games | Goals |
|---|---|---|---|---|
| 861 | Josh Gibson | 2010–2017 | 160 | 3 |
| 862 | Rhan Hooper | 2010 | 6 | 7 |
| 863 | Jarrod Kayler-Thomson | 2010 | 3 | 1 |
| 864 | Carl Peterson | 2010 | 17 | 13 |
| 865 | Ben Stratton | 2010–2020 | 202 | 2 |
| 866 | Shaun Burgoyne | 2010–2021 | 250 | 131 |
| 867 | Wayde Skipper | 2010 | 15 | 1 |
| 868 | Cameron Bruce | 2011–2012 | 10 | 1 |
| 869 | David Hale | 2011–2015 | 108 | 98 |
| 870 | Paul Puopolo | 2011–2020 | 196 | 185 |
| 871 | Isaac Smith | 2011–2020 | 210 | 165 |
| 872 | Luke Breust | 2011–2025 | 308 | 553 |
| 873 | Kyle Cheney | 2011–2014 | 27 | 2 |
| 874 | Jordan Lisle | 2011 | 5 | 1 |
| 875 | Paul Johnson | 2011 | 1 | 1 |
| 876 | Jarrad Boumann | 2012 | 2 | 0 |
| 877 | Jack Gunston^ | 2012–2022; 2024– | 271 | 578 |
| 878 | Broc McCauley | 2012 | 3 | 1 |
| 879 | Bradley Hill | 2012–2016 | 95 | 58 |
| 880 | Jed Anderson | 2013–2015 | 10 | 4 |
| 881 | Taylor Duryea | 2013–2018 | 118 | 21 |
| 882 | Brian Lake | 2013–2015 | 54 | 2 |
| 883 | Jonathan Simpkin | 2013–2015 | 33 | 15 |
| 884 | Matt Spangher | 2013–2016 | 24 | 2 |
| 885 | Sam Grimley | 2013 | 3 | 3 |
| 886 | Jonathon Ceglar | 2013–2021 | 101 | 43 |
| 887 | Will Langford | 2013–2018 | 72 | 24 |
| 888 | Ben McEvoy | 2014–2022 | 161 | 79 |
| 889 | Tim O'Brien | 2014–2021 | 97 | 73 |
| 890 | Derick Wanganeen | 2014 | 1 | 0 |
| 891 | Angus Litherland | 2014–2016 | 25 | 1 |
| 892 | Mitch Hallahan | 2014 | 6 | 2 |
| 893 | Billy Hartung | 2014–2017 | 63 | 27 |
| 894 | Luke Lowden | 2014 | 1 | 3 |
| 895 | Ben Ross | 2014 | 4 | 1 |
| 896 | Alex Woodward | 2014 | 2 | 0 |
| 897 | James Frawley | 2015–2020 | 100 | 6 |
| 898 | Jonathan O'Rourke | 2015–2018 | 12 | 4 |
| 899 | James Sicily^ | 2015– | 203 | 78 |
| 900 | Daniel Howe | 2015–2022 | 96 | 22 |
| 901 | Marc Pittonet | 2016–2019 | 7 | 0 |
| 902 | Kieran Lovell | 2016 | 2 | 0 |
| 903 | Kaiden Brand | 2016–2019 | 43 | 0 |
| 904 | Kade Stewart | 2016–2017 | 7 | 5 |
| 905 | Blake Hardwick^ | 2016– | 223 | 41 |
| 906 | Kurt Heatherley | 2016–2017 | 5 | 0 |
| 907 | Ryan Burton | 2016–2018 | 47 | 5 |
| 908 | Jack Fitzpatrick | 2016–2017 | 4 | 3 |
| 909 | Ricky Henderson | 2017–2020 | 69 | 36 |
| 910 | Tom Mitchell | 2017–2022 | 106 | 38 |
| 911 | Jaeger O'Meara | 2017–2022 | 99 | 43 |
| 912 | Ty Vickery | 2017 | 6 | 2 |
| 913 | Teia Miles | 2017–2018 | 12 | 5 |
| 914 | James Cousins | 2017–2021 | 35 | 12 |
| 915 | Dallas Willsmore | 2017 | 2 | 0 |
| 916 | Conor Glass | 2017–2020 | 21 | 2 |
| 917 | Harry Morrison^ | 2017– | 138 | 35 |
| 918 | Jarman Impey^ | 2018– | 169 | 39 |
| 919 | David Mirra | 2018–2019 | 11 | 0 |
| 920 | James Worpel | 2018–2025 | 148 | 49 |
| 921 | Mitch Lewis^ | 2018– | 102 | 172 |
| 922 | Conor Nash^ | 2018– | 130 | 24 |
| 923 | Jack Scrimshaw^ | 2019– | 125 | 11 |
| 924 | Tom Scully | 2019–2020 | 35 | 16 |
| 925 | Dylan Moore^ | 2019– | 150 | 157 |
| 926 | Chad Wingard | 2019–2023 | 71 | 68 |
| 927 | Oliver Hanrahan | 2019–2021 | 29 | 18 |
| 928 | Changkuoth Jiath | 2019–2025 | 76 | 5 |

=== 2020s ===
| Order | Player | Season(s) | Games | Goals |
|---|---|---|---|---|
| 929 | Sam Frost | 2020–2025 | 94 | 1 |
| 930 | Jonathon Patton | 2020 | 6 | 3 |
| 931 | Harry Jones | 2020 | 1 | 0 |
| 932 | Will Day^ | 2020– | 89 | 28 |
| 933 | Josh Morris | 2020–2022 | 15 | 1 |
| 934 | Darren Minchington | 2020 | 4 | 2 |
| 935 | Keegan Brooksby | 2020 | 1 | 0 |
| 936 | Michael Hartley | 2020–2021 | 5 | 1 |
| 937 | Damon Greaves | 2020–2021 | 10 | 1 |
| 938 | Finn Maginness | 2020–2026 | 64 | 16 |
| 939 | Tyler Brockman | 2021–2023 | 26 | 23 |
| 940 | Connor Downie | 2021 | 2 | 0 |
| 941 | Kyle Hartigan | 2021–2022 | 22 | 0 |
| 942 | Jacob Koschitzke | 2021–2023 | 48 | 54 |
| 943 | Tom Phillips | 2021–2022 | 26 | 13 |
| 944 | Emerson Jeka | 2021–2022 | 7 | 2 |
| 945 | Ned Reeves^ | 2021– | 58 | 16 |
| 946 | Jai Newcombe^ | 2021– | 127 | 51 |
| 947 | Lachlan Bramble | 2021–2023 | 30 | 2 |
| 948 | Denver Grainger-Barras | 2021–2023 | 28 | 4 |
| 949 | Max Lynch | 2022–2023 | 8 | 4 |
| 950 | Connor MacDonald^ | 2022– | 115 | 87 |
| 951 | Josh Ward^ | 2022– | 92 | 14 |
| 952 | Jackson Callow | 2022 | 3 | 0 |
| 953 | Sam Butler | 2022–2026 | 33 | 19 |
| 954 | James Blanck | 2022–2023 | 24 | 0 |
| 955 | Jai Serong | 2022–2024 | 10 | 1 |
| 956 | Ned Long | 2022–2023 | 5 | 1 |
| 957 | Jack Saunders | 2022 | 1 | 1 |
| 958 | Karl Amon^ | 2023– | 91 | 17 |
| 959 | Fergus Greene | 2023 | 11 | 15 |
| 960 | Cameron Mackenzie^ | 2023– | 69 | 16 |
| 961 | Lloyd Meek^ | 2023– | 87 | 25 |
| 962 | Seamus Mitchell | 2023–2025 | 28 | 0 |
| 963 | Max Ramsden^ | 2023– | 11 | 6 |
| 964 | Josh Weddle^ | 2023– | 82 | 30 |
| 965 | Bailey Macdonald^ | 2023– | 22 | 1 |
| 966 | Brandon Ryan | 2023 | 3 | 4 |
| 967 | Henry Hustwaite | 2023–2026 | 11 | 2 |
| 968 | Mabior Chol^ | 2024– | 67 | 110 |
| 969 | Massimo D'Ambrosio^ | 2024– | 75 | 17 |
| 970 | Jack Ginnivan^ | 2024– | 72 | 77 |
| 971 | Nick Watson^ | 2024– | 66 | 124 |
| 972 | Calsher Dear^ | 2024– | 31 | 39 |
| 973 | Ethan Phillips | 2024 | 1 | 0 |
| 974 | Tom Barrass^ | 2025– | 46 | 1 |
| 975 | Josh Battle^ | 2025– | 49 | 2 |
| 976 | Jack Dalton^ | 2026– | 5 | 3 |
| 977 | Flynn Perez^ | 2026– | 7 | 0 |
| 978 | Will McCabe^ | 2026– | 4 | 2 |
| 979 | Bodie Ryan | 2026 | 5 | 0 |
| 980 | Cam Nairn^ | 2026– | 4 | 0 |
| 981 | Matt Hill^ | 2026– | 2 | 2 |
| 982 | Noah Mraz^ | 2026– | 4 | 1 |
| 983 | Ollie Greeves^ | 2026– | 4 | 0 |
| 984 | Aidan Schubert | 2026 | 1 | 0 |
| 985 | Max Beattie^ | 2026– | 4 | 3 |

== Hawthorn Football Club players (Women's) ==
This is a list of Hawthorn Football Club women's players who have made one or more appearance in the AFL Women's (AFLW).

Key
| Order | Players are listed in order of debut |
| Seasons | Includes Hawthorn only careers and spans from their first season at the club until their last. |
| Games | Statistics are for AFLW regular season and finals series matches played at Hawthorn. |
| Goals | Statistics are for AFLW regular season and finals series matches played at Hawthorn. |
| ^{^} | Currently listed players |

As of the end of the 2025 season

=== 2020s ===
| Order | Player | Year(s) | Games | Goals |
|---|---|---|---|---|
| 1 | Kaitlyn Ashmore^ | 2022– | 42 | 9 |
| 2 | Zoe Barbakos | 2022–2023 | 7 | 2 |
| 3 | Charlotte Baskaran | 2022–2024 | 25 | 6 |
| 4 | Catherine Brown | 2022–2023 | 16 | 1 |
| 5 | Dominique Carbone | 2022 | 6 | 0 |
| 6 | Tegan Cunningham | 2022–2023 | 8 | 0 |
| 7 | Bridget Deed | 2022–2024 | 7 | 0 |
| 8 | Jess Duffin | 2022 | 10 | 7 |
| 9 | Mackenzie Eardley^ | 2022– | 38 | 5 |
| 10 | Tahlia Fellows | 2022–2024 | 18 | 10 |
| 11 | Jasmine Fleming^ | 2022– | 43 | 7 |
| 12 | Aileen Gilroy | 2022–2025 | 42 | 23 |
| 13 | Sophie Locke | 2022–2024 | 20 | 5 |
| 14 | Tilly Lucas-Rodd | 2022–2025 | 47 | 4 |
| 15 | Tamara Luke | 2022–2023 | 9 | 0 |
| 16 | Akec Makur Chuot | 2022–2023 | 17 | 1 |
| 17 | Sarah Perkins | 2022–2023 | 5 | 1 |
| 18 | Eliza Shannon | 2022 | 6 | 0 |
| 19 | Tamara Smith^ | 2022– | 45 | 1 |
| 20 | Louise Stephenson | 2022–2024 | 17 | 5 |
| 21 | Lucy Wales^ | 2022– | 41 | 0 |
| 22 | Kate McCarthy | 2022 | 3 | 0 |
| 23 | Laura Elliott^ | 2022– | 39 | 0 |
| 24 | Bridie Hipwell^ | 2022– | 33 | 15 |
| 25 | Ainslie Kemp^ | 2022– | 25 | 0 |
| 26 | Isabelle Porter | 2022 | 8 | 0 |
| 27 | Áine McDonagh^ | 2022– | 44 | 52 |
| 28 | Emily Everist^ | 2022– | 36 | 0 |
| 29 | Jenna Richardson^ | 2022– | 40 | 0 |
| 30 | Janet Baird | 2022–2023 | 1 | 0 |
| 31 | Emily Bates^ | 2023– | 30 | 7 |
| 32 | Greta Bodey^ | 2023– | 35 | 32 |
| 33 | Mattea Breed | 2023–2024 | 19 | 3 |
| 34 | Kristy Stratton | 2023–2025 | 17 | 7 |
| 35 | Casey Sherriff^ | 2024– | 20 | 5 |
| 36 | Laura Stone^ | 2024– | 21 | 7 |
| 37 | Jess Vukic^ | 2024– | 20 | 3 |
| 38 | Eliza West^ | 2024– | 27 | 5 |
| 39 | Mikayla Williamson^ | 2024– | 26 | 5 |
| 40 | Hayley McLaughlin^ | 2024– | 17 | 2 |
| 41 | Sophie Butterworth | 2024–2025 | 6 | 0 |
| 42 | Najwa Allen^ | 2025– | 7 | 0 |
| 43 | Lavinia Cox^ | 2025– | 3 | 0 |
| 44 | Keely Coyne^ | 2025– | 14 | 2 |
| 45 | Grace Baba^ | 2025– | 9 | 0 |
| 46 | Elli Symonds^ | 2025– | 8 | 2 |
| 47 | Daisy Flockart^ | 2025– | 7 | 1 |
| 48 | Nat Exon | 2025 | 3 | 0 |

== See also ==
- List of Hawthorn Football Club coaches
