= Peter Hancock =

Peter Hancock may refer to:

- Peter Hancock (bishop) (born 1955), British Anglican bishop
- Peter Hancock (businessman), former president and chief executive officer of AIG
- Peter Hancock (footballer) (1931–2020), Australian rules footballer
- Peter Hancock (professor) (born 1953), British-American scientist of human factors and ergonomics
