= Bill Moore (Australian footballer) =

Australian rules footballer

Personal information
- Full name: William Milne Moore
- Born: 5 March 1917; Fitzroy North, Victoria
- Died: 4 February 2009 (aged 91)
- Height: 180 cm (5 ft 11 in)
- Weight: 80 kg (176 lb)

Playing career^{1}
Years	Club	Games (Goals)
1938–1941	Hawthorn	31 (11)
- ^{1} Playing statistics correct to the end of 1941.

William Milne Moore (5 March 1917 – 4 February 2009) was an Australian rules footballer who played with Hawthorn in the Victorian Football League (VFL).

Milne also served in the Australian Army during World War II.
