= Alf Chown =

Australian rules footballer

Personal information
- Full name: Alfred James Chown
- Born: 28 April 1932 (age 94)
- Original team: Sale
- Height: 178 cm (5 ft 10 in)
- Weight: 76 kg (168 lb)

Playing career^{1}
Years	Club	Games (Goals)
1953	Hawthorn	12 (3)
- ^{1} Playing statistics correct to the end of 1953.

Alfred James Chown (born 28 April 1932) is a former Australian rules footballer who played for the Hawthorn Football Club in the Victorian Football League (VFL).
