= Ted Johnson (footballer, born 1948) =

Australian rules footballer

Personal information
- Full name: Ted Johnson
- Born: 25 January 1948 (age 78)
- Original team: Marcellin College
- Height: 178 cm (5 ft 10 in)
- Weight: 75 kg (165 lb)

Playing career^{1}
Years	Club	Games (Goals)
1966–69	Hawthorn	42 (1)
- ^{1} Playing statistics correct to the end of 1969.

Ted Johnson (born 25 January 1948) is a former Australian rules footballer who played with Hawthorn in the Victorian Football League (VFL).
