= John O'Halloran (footballer) =

Australian rules footballer, born 1901

Personal information
- Full name: John Alphonsus O'Halloran
- Born: 27 July 1901; St James, Victoria
- Died: 20 February 1979 (aged 77); Malvern East, Victoria

Playing career^{1}
Years	Club	Games (Goals)
1929	Hawthorn	1 (0)
- ^{1} Playing statistics correct to the end of 1929.

John Alphonsus O'Halloran (27 July 1901 – 20 February 1979) was an Australian rules footballer who played with Hawthorn in the Victorian Football League (VFL).
