= Merv Yelland =

Australian rules footballer, born 1906

Personal information
- Full name: Mervyn Douglas Yelland
- Born: 13 June 1906; Essendon, Victoria
- Died: 19 August 1931 (aged 25); Cheltenham, Victoria
- Original team: Camberwell Methodists
- Height: 171 cm (5 ft 7 in)
- Weight: 68 kg (150 lb)

Playing career^{1}
Years	Club	Games (Goals)
1928	Hawthorn	2 (1)
- ^{1} Playing statistics correct to the end of 1928.

Mervyn Douglas Yelland (13 June 1906 – 19 August 1931) was an Australian rules footballer who played with Hawthorn in the Victorian Football League (VFL).
