= Ross Johnson (Australian footballer) =

Australian rules footballer

Personal information
- Full name: Ross Johnson
- Born: 22 July 1951 (age 75)
- Original team: Peninsula
- Height: 189 cm (6 ft 2 in)
- Weight: 91 kg (201 lb)

Playing career^{1}
Years	Club	Games (Goals)
1971–1972	Hawthorn	7 (0)
- ^{1} Playing statistics correct to the end of 1972.

Ross Johnson (born 22 July 1951) is a former Australian rules footballer who played with Hawthorn in the Victorian Football League (VFL).
