= Len Woolf =

Australian rules footballer

Personal information
- Full name: Leonard Roy Woolf
- Born: 12 November 1921; Camberwell, Victoria
- Died: 8 November 2014 (aged 92); Brisbane
- Original team: Auburn
- Height: 180 cm (5 ft 11 in)
- Weight: 76 kg (168 lb)

Playing career^{1}
Years	Club	Games (Goals)
1947–48	Hawthorn	16 (4)
- ^{1} Playing statistics correct to the end of 1948.

Leonard Roy Woolf (12 November 1921 – 8 November 2014) was an Australian rules footballer who played with Hawthorn in the Victorian Football League (VFL).
