= Jim Rattray =

Australian rules footballer

Personal information
- Full name: George James Rattray
- Born: 22 August 1929
- Died: 15 September 2014 (aged 85)
- Height: 175 cm (5 ft 9 in)
- Weight: 72 kg (159 lb)

Playing career^{1}
Years	Club	Games (Goals)
1949–52	Hawthorn	18 (4)
- ^{1} Playing statistics correct to the end of 1952.

George James Rattray (22 August 1929 – 15 September 2014) was an Australian rules footballer who played with Hawthorn in the Victorian Football League (VFL).

Rattray died in September 2014.
