= Len Petch =

Australian rules footballer

Personal information
- Full name: Leonard Roy Petch
- Born: 24 November 1954 (age 71); Traralgon, Victoria
- Original team: Yarragon
- Height: 191 cm (6 ft 3 in)
- Weight: 91 kg (201 lb)

Playing career^{1}
Years	Club	Games (Goals)
1973–1977	Hawthorn	23 (0)
- ^{1} Playing statistics correct to the end of 1977.

Leonard Roy Petch (born 24 November 1954) is a former Australian rules footballer who played with Hawthorn in the Victorian Football League (VFL).
