= Willie Woolf =

Australian rules footballer, born 1907

Personal information
- Full name: Vincent William Woolf
- Born: 21 April 1907; Carlton North, Victoria
- Died: 10 May 1959 (aged 52); Fitzroy, Victoria
- Original team: Auburn
- Height: 180 cm (5 ft 11 in)
- Weight: 76 kg (168 lb)

Playing career^{1}
Years	Club	Games (Goals)
1928, 1931	Hawthorn	10 (0)
- ^{1} Playing statistics correct to the end of 1931.

Vincent William Woolf (21 April 1907 – 10 May 1959) was an Australian rules footballer who played with Hawthorn in the Victorian Football League (VFL).
