= Peter Ryan (footballer, born 1948) =

Australian rules footballer

Personal information
- Full name: Peter Ryan
- Born: 29 January 1948 (age 78)
- Original team: South Bendigo
- Height: 178 cm (5 ft 10 in)
- Weight: 76 kg (168 lb)

Playing career^{1}
Years	Club	Games (Goals)
1967	Hawthorn	1 (0)
- ^{1} Playing statistics correct to the end of 1967.

Peter Ryan (born 29 January 1948) is a former Australian rules footballer who played with Hawthorn in the Victorian Football League (VFL).
