= Vic McKinnon =

Australian rules footballer

Personal information
- Full name: Albert Victor McKinnon
- Born: 19 January 1926; Williamstown, Victoria
- Died: 4 June 2001 (aged 75); Tathra, New South Wales
- Height: 183 cm (6 ft 0 in)
- Weight: 87 kg (192 lb)

Playing career^{1}
Years	Club	Games (Goals)
1949–52	Hawthorn	48 (8)
- ^{1} Playing statistics correct to the end of 1952.

Albert Victor McKinnon (19 January 1926 – 4 June 2001) was an Australian rules footballer who played with Hawthorn in the Victorian Football League (VFL).

== Early life ==
The son of John McKinnon (1886–1973) and Lynda McKinnon (1899–1988), née Hyde, Albert Victor McKinnon was born at Williamstown on 19 January 1926. McKinnon enlisted to serve in the Royal Australian Air Force in February 1944, shortly after turning 18. He served in Melbourne and was a Leading Aircraftman at the time of his discharge in July 1945.

== Football ==
McKinnon first trained with Hawthorn in 1946, being noted as a centre half-forward from Surrey Hills. He played briefly in the reserves but returned to Surrey Hills for three years before returning to Hawthorn in 1949 where he played the majority of games over the next four seasons. He later played with Trafalgar in the Gippsland Football League.
