= Bert Amey =

Australian rules footballer

Personal information
- Full name: Herbert Charles Amey
- Born: 25 November 1924; Auburn, Victoria
- Died: 6 January 2003 (aged 78); Hawthorn, Victoria
- Original team: Auburn
- Height: 166 cm (5 ft 5 in)
- Weight: 60 kg (132 lb)

Playing career^{1}
Years	Club	Games (Goals)
1944	Hawthorn	3 (0)
- ^{1} Playing statistics correct to the end of 1944.

Herbert Charles Amey (25 November 1924 – 6 January 2003) was an Australian rules footballer who played for the Hawthorn Football Club in the Victorian Football League (VFL).
