= Neil Allison (Australian footballer) =

Australian rules footballer

Personal information
- Full name: Neil James Allison
- Born: 11 October 1912; Carlton, Victoria
- Died: 21 October 1962 (aged 50); Brooklyn, Victoria
- Height: 171 cm (5 ft 7 in)
- Weight: 74 kg (163 lb)

Playing career^{1}
| Years | Club | Games (Goals) |
| 1934, 1936–39 | Hawthorn | 34 (2) |
- ^{1} Playing statistics correct to the end of 1939.

Neil James Allison (11 October 1912 – 21 October 1962) was an Australian rules footballer who played with Hawthorn in the Victorian Football League (VFL).

== Family ==
The son of James Neil Allison (1890–1913), and Elsie Grace Allison, née Coleman, Neil James Allison was born in Carlton, Victoria on 11 October 1912. He married Olive "Bub" Burnett in 1940. They had one son, Patrick.

== Football ==
He played with Hawthorn in the Victorian Football League (VFL). In 1939 he applied for a clearance to Coburg Football Club in the VFA.

== Military service ==
He enlisted in the Second AIF in June 1940.

== Death ==
He died as a result of the injuries sustained in an accident on 21 October 1962, when a car in which he was a passenger struck a tree on the Geelong Road, in West Footscray.
