= Peter O'Shea =

Australian rules footballer

Personal information
- Full name: Peter O'Shea
- Born: 5 October 1945 (age 81)
- Original team: Carisbrook
- Height: 170 cm (5 ft 7 in)
- Weight: 64 kg (141 lb)

Playing career^{1}
Years	Club	Games (Goals)
1965	Hawthorn	9 (10)
- ^{1} Playing statistics correct to the end of 1965.

Peter O'Shea (born 5 October 1945) is a former Australian rules footballer who played with Hawthorn in the Victorian Football League (VFL).
