= Ron Harris (Australian footballer) =

Australian rules footballer

Personal information
- Full name: Ronald William Harris
- Born: 16 January 1924; Hawthorn, Victoria
- Died: 9 December 2006 (aged 82)
- Height: 185 cm (6 ft 1 in)
- Weight: 85 kg (187 lb)

Playing career^{1}
Years	Club	Games (Goals)
1942–43, 1946	Hawthorn	22 (7)
- ^{1} Playing statistics correct to the end of 1946.

Ronald William Harris (16 January 1924 – 9 December 2006) was an Australian rules footballer who played with Hawthorn in the Victorian Football League (VFL).
