= Syd Hayhow =

Australian rules footballer, born 1906

Personal information
- Full name: Sydney Russell Hayhow
- Born: 29 June 1906; Northcote, Victoria
- Died: 28 June 1978 (aged 71); Bentleigh East, Victoria
- Height: 182 cm (6 ft 0 in)
- Weight: 87 kg (192 lb)

Playing career^{1}
Years	Club	Games (Goals)
1927	St Kilda	9 (0)
1928	Hawthorn	6 (0)
Total		15 (0)
- ^{1} Playing statistics correct to the end of 1928.

Sydney Russell Hayhow (29 June 1906 – 28 June 1978) was an Australian rules footballer who played with St Kilda and Hawthorn in the Victorian Football League (VFL).
