= Alf Neeson =

Australian rules footballer (born 1914)

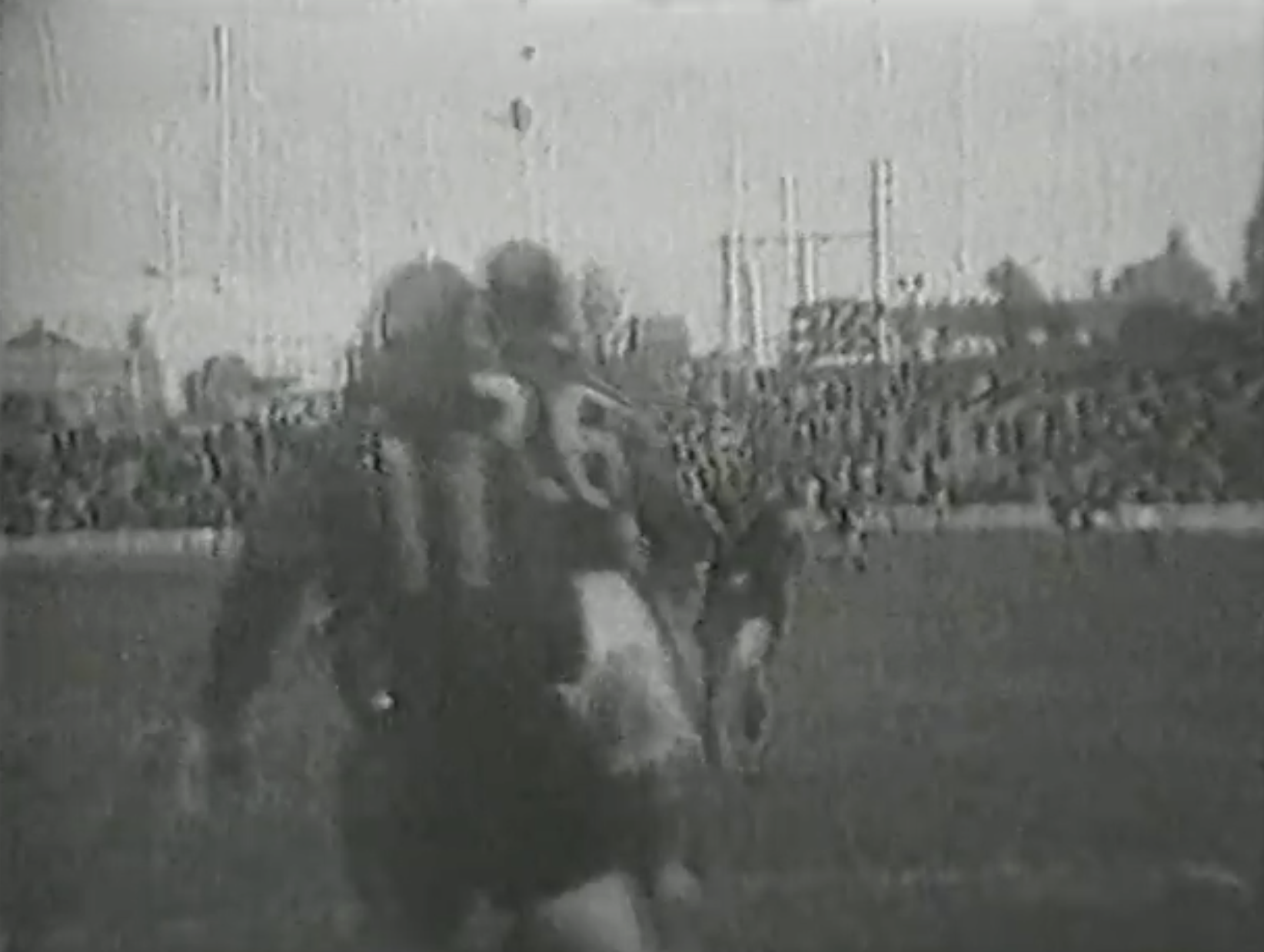
- Neeson (number 11) in 1937

Personal information
- Full name: Alfred Carl Frank Neeson
- Born: 15 June 1914; Collingwood, Victoria
- Died: Unknown
- Original team: Frankston
- Height: 182 cm (6 ft 0 in)
- Weight: 77 kg (170 lb)

Playing career^{1}
Years	Club	Games (Goals)
1935–1936	Fitzroy	7 (0)
1936–1938	Hawthorn	34 (41)
Total		41 (41)
- ^{1} Playing statistics correct to the end of 1938.

Alfred Carl Frank Neeson (born 15 June 1914, date of death unknown) was an Australian rules footballer who played for the Fitzroy Football Club and Hawthorn Football Club in the Victorian Football League (VFL).

== Career ==
Neeson was originally from Frankston, but played in Sydney with St George then Goulburn in the Canberra league, before joining Fitzroy. He made seven appearances for Fitzroy, over the 1935 and 1936 seasons, followed by three years with Hawthorn, for which he played 34 games.

In 1939, while in Western Australia playing for East Perth, Neeson was sentenced to four-months imprisonment for stealing a motor car.
