= Jack Fisher (footballer) =

Australian rules footballer

Personal information
- Full name: Jack Fisher
- Born: 22 January 1922
- Died: 10 July 2015 (aged 93)
- Original team: Footscray Juniors
- Height: 182 cm (6 ft 0 in)
- Weight: 80 kg (176 lb)

Playing career^{1}
Years	Club	Games (Goals)
1947	Hawthorn	2 (0)
- ^{1} Playing statistics correct to the end of 1947.

Jack Fisher (22 January 1922 – 10 July 2015) was an Australian rules footballer who played with Hawthorn in the Victorian Football League (VFL).
