= Garry Lester =

Australian rules footballer

Personal information
- Full name: Garry Lester
- Born: 3 March 1947 (age 79)
- Height: 189 cm (6 ft 2 in)
- Weight: 85 kg (187 lb)

Playing career^{1}
Years	Club	Games (Goals)
1967	Hawthorn	10 (5)
- ^{1} Playing statistics correct to the end of 1967.

Garry Lester (born 3 March 1947) is a former Australian rules footballer who played with Hawthorn in the Victorian Football League (VFL).
