= Terry Fitzgerald (footballer) =

Australian rules footballer

Personal information
- Full name: Terry Fitzgerald
- Born: 28 June 1952 (age 74)
- Original teams: St Leo's College, Box Hill
- Height: 188 cm (6 ft 2 in)
- Weight: 87 kg (192 lb)

Playing career^{1}
Years	Club	Games (Goals)
1972	Hawthorn	1 (0)
- ^{1} Playing statistics correct to the end of 1972.

Terry Fitzgerald (born 28 June 1952) is a former Australian rules footballer who played with Hawthorn in the Victorian Football League (VFL).
