= Paul Tolson =

Australian rules footballer

Personal information
- Full name: Paul Tolson
- Born: 2 February 1948 (age 78)
- Original team: Crib Point
- Height: 179 cm (5 ft 10 in)
- Weight: 80 kg (176 lb)

Playing career^{1}
Years	Club	Games (Goals)
1968–69	Hawthorn	9 (4)
- ^{1} Playing statistics correct to the end of 1969.

Paul Tolson (born 2 February 1948) is a former Australian rules footballer who played with Hawthorn in the Victorian Football League (VFL).
