= Russell Donaldson =

Australian rules footballer

Personal information
- Full name: Russell Donaldson
- Born: 10 August 1951 (age 75)
- Original team: Drouin
- Height: 183 cm (6 ft 0 in)
- Weight: 82 kg (181 lb)

Playing career^{1}
Years	Club	Games (Goals)
1974	Hawthorn	2 (0)
- ^{1} Playing statistics correct to the end of 1974.

Russell Donaldson (born 10 August 1951) is a former Australian rules footballer who played with Hawthorn in the Victorian Football League (VFL).
