= Morton Wright =

Australian rules footballer, born 1914

Personal information
- Full name: George Morton Wright
- Born: 23 August 1914; Mount Gambier, South Australia
- Died: 26 October 1940 (aged 26); Collingwood, Victoria
- Original team: Mount Gambier
- Height: 180 cm (5 ft 11 in)
- Weight: 83 kg (183 lb)

Playing career^{1}
Years	Club	Games (Goals)
1938	Hawthorn	1 (0)
- ^{1} Playing statistics correct to the end of 1938.

George Morton Wright (23 August 1914 – 26 October 1940) was an Australian rules footballer who played with Hawthorn in the Victorian Football League (VFL).

== Family ==
The son of George Edgar Wright (1883-1954), and Annie May Wright (1888-1936), née Morton, George Morton Wright was born at Mount Gambier, South Australia, on 23 August 1914.

He married Lorna Helen Payne (1912-1988), later Mrs. William Beeston Ross, in 1940.

== Swimming ==
Wright had a successful swimming career before playing football.

== Football ==
Initially linked with Geelong's Second XVIII, he was cleared to Hawthorn on 25 May 1938, where he played a single senior game against Fitzroy, on 13 June 1938, at the Glenferrie Oval.

== Death ==
A fireman, Wright, died when the two upper floors and roof of a waste-paper factory collapsed on him while he was fighting a fire -- that had been lit by two boys -- in Collingwood on the night of 26 October 1940.

At the time of his death, he had passed all of the tests required to train as an RAAF pilot, but when the Fire Brigade declared that it would not release him to the RAAF, Wright made an appeal direct to the Victorian Premier, Albert Dunstan, and was waiting to hear the results of the Premier's efforts on his behalf.
