= Bob Willis (footballer) =

Australian rules footballer

Personal information
- Full name: Bob Willis
- Born: 24 October 1942 (age 84)
- Original team: Springvale
- Height: 178 cm (5 ft 10 in)
- Weight: 76 kg (168 lb)

Playing career^{1}
Years	Club	Games (Goals)
1965	Hawthorn	4 (0)
- ^{1} Playing statistics correct to the end of 1965.

Bob Willis (born 24 October 1942) is a former Australian rules footballer who played with Hawthorn in the Victorian Football League (VFL).
