= Peter Chilton =

Australian rules footballer

Personal information
- Full name: Peter Chilton
- Born: 18 June 1948 (age 78)
- Original team: Jeparit
- Height: 178 cm (5 ft 10 in)
- Weight: 76 kg (168 lb)
- Position: Utility

Playing career^{1}
Years	Club	Games (Goals)
1967–71	Hawthorn	37 (9)
- ^{1} Playing statistics correct to the end of 1971.

Peter Chilton (born 18 June 1948) is a former Australian rules footballer who played with Hawthorn in the Victorian Football League (VFL).
