= Alby Hodges =

Australian rules footballer, born 1918

Personal information
- Full name: Albert Mosley Hodges
- Born: 19 April 1918; Richmond, Victoria
- Died: 4 February 1965 (aged 46); Parkville, Victoria
- Original team: Richmond Amateurs
- Height: 178 cm (5 ft 10 in)
- Weight: 82 kg (181 lb)

Playing career^{1}
Years	Club	Games (Goals)
1940	Richmond	1 (0)
1941	Hawthorn	9 (2)
Total		10 (2)
- ^{1} Playing statistics correct to the end of 1941.

Albert Mosley Hodges (19 April 1918 – 4 February 1965) was an Australian rules footballer who played for the Richmond Football Club and Hawthorn Football Club in the Victorian Football League (VFL).
