= Norm Gordes =

Australian rules footballer

Personal information
- Full name: Norm Gordes
- Born: 8 January 1946 (age 80)
- Original team: East Sandringham
- Height: 196 cm (6 ft 5 in)
- Weight: 84 kg (185 lb)

Playing career^{1}
| Years | Club | Games (Goals) |
| 1965–67 | Hawthorn | 20 (3) |
- ^{1} Playing statistics correct to the end of 1967.

Norm Gordes (born 8 January 1946) is a former Australian rules footballer who played with Hawthorn in the Victorian Football League (VFL).
