= Fred Sayer =

Australian rules footballer, born 1913

Personal information
- Full name: Fred Sayer
- Born: 6 June 1913
- Died: 7 April 1972 (aged 58)
- Original team: Scotch College

Playing career^{1}
Years	Club	Games (Goals)
1933–34	Hawthorn	7 (4)
- ^{1} Playing statistics correct to the end of 1934.

Fred Sayer (6 June 1913 – 7 April 1972) was an Australian rules footballer who played with Hawthorn in the Victorian Football League (VFL).
