= Reg Farrant =

Australian rules footballer

Personal information
- Full name: Reg Farrant
- Born: 9 September 1920
- Died: 6 April 2005 (aged 84)
- Original team: Cohuna
- Height: 180 cm (5 ft 11 in)
- Weight: 75 kg (165 lb)

Playing career^{1}
Years	Club	Games (Goals)
1940	Hawthorn	5 (1)
- ^{1} Playing statistics correct to the end of 1940.

Reg Farrant (9 September 1920 – 6 April 2005) was an Australian rules footballer who played with Hawthorn in the Victorian Football League (VFL).

Farrant enlisted in the Royal Australian Air Force and made the rank of Flying Officer. During the Borneo campaign on August 7 1945 the Beaufighter he was a crew member of was shot down over Borneo. He suffered a leg injury. Aided by his Flight Lt. Vernon Sims the pair received help by local villagers to evade the Japanese soldiers and managed to reach the Australian base at Miri.
