= Jack Clements (footballer) =

Australian rules footballer

Personal information
- Full name: Jack Clements
- Born: 29 October 1915
- Died: 23 December 2010 (aged 95)
- Height: 180 cm (5 ft 11 in)
- Weight: 74 kg (163 lb)

Playing career^{1}
| Years | Club | Games (Goals) |
| 1936–1937 | Hawthorn | 7 (6) |
- ^{1} Playing statistics correct to the end of 1937.

Jack Clements (29 October 1915 – 23 December 2010) was an Australian rules footballer who played with Hawthorn in the Victorian Football League (VFL).
