= Rod Horrocks =

Australian rules footballer

Personal information
- Full name: Rodney Alfred Horrocks
- Born: 5 March 1934
- Died: 8 July 2023 (aged 89)
- Original team: Myers
- Height: 175 cm (5 ft 9 in)
- Weight: 73 kg (161 lb)

Playing career^{1}
Years	Club	Games (Goals)
1955–56	Hawthorn	4 (0)
- ^{1} Playing statistics correct to the end of 1956.

Rodney Alfred Horrocks (5 March 1934 – 8 July 2023) was a former Australian rules footballer who played with Hawthorn in the Victorian Football League (VFL).

Horrocks took part in national service for the Royal Australian Air Force. He died in July 2023.
