= Vin Crowe =

Australian rules footballer

Personal information
- Full name: Vincent Robert Crowe
- Born: 13 January 1946 (age 80)
- Original team: North Melbourne
- Height: 182 cm (6 ft 0 in)
- Weight: 80 kg (176 lb)

Playing career^{1}
Years	Club	Games (Goals)
1964	Richmond	1 (1)
1967–68	Hawthorn	14 (3)
Total		15 (4)
- ^{1} Playing statistics correct to the end of 1968.

Vincent Robert Crowe (born 13 January 1946) is a former Australian rules footballer who played with Richmond and Hawthorn in the Victorian Football League (VFL).

In 2003 he was selected in Prahran's Team of the Century.
