= Norm Watson =

Australian rules footballer

Personal information
- Full name: Norm Watson
- Born: 24 October 1940 (age 86)
- Original team: Ashburton
- Height: 188 cm (6 ft 2 in)
- Weight: 80 kg (176 lb)

Playing career^{1}
Years	Club	Games (Goals)
1962–64	Hawthorn	10 (0)
- ^{1} Playing statistics correct to the end of 1964.

Norm Watson (born 24 October 1940) is a former Australian rules footballer who played with Hawthorn in the Victorian Football League (VFL).
