= Charlie Sherer =

Australian rules footballer

Personal information
- Full name: Charles Stephen Sherer
- Born: 28 July 1903
- Died: 13 July 1967 (aged 63)
- Original team: Fairfield
- Height: 177 cm (5 ft 10 in)
- Weight: 74 kg (163 lb)
- Position: Centre

Playing career^{1}
Years	Club	Games (Goals)
1927–1929	Hawthorn	32 (1)
- ^{1} Playing statistics correct to the end of 1929.

Charlie Sherer (28 July 1903 – 13 July 1967) was an Australian rules footballer who played with Hawthorn in the Victorian Football League (VFL).
