= John McGreevy (footballer) =

Australian rules footballer

Personal information
- Full name: John McGreevy
- Born: 11 May 1930
- Died: 24 July 2011 (aged 81)
- Original team: Duntroon Military College
- Height: 184 cm (6 ft 0 in)
- Weight: 82 kg (181 lb)

Playing career^{1}
Years	Club	Games (Goals)
1952	Hawthorn	3 (0)
- ^{1} Playing statistics correct to the end of 1952.

John McGreevy (11 May 1930 – 24 July 2011) was an Australian rules footballer who played with Hawthorn in the Victorian Football League (VFL).
