= Shane McGrath (footballer, born 1964) =

Australian rules footballer

Personal information
- Born: 4 March 1964 (age 62)
- Original team: Trafalgar (MGFL)
- Height: 191 cm (6 ft 3 in)
- Weight: 89 kg (196 lb)

Playing career^{1}
Years	Club	Games (Goals)
1984	Hawthorn	1 (1)
- ^{1} Playing statistics correct to the end of 1984.

Shane McGrath (born 4 March 1964) is a former Australian rules footballer who played one game for Hawthorn in the Victorian Football League in 1984. He was recruited from Trafalgar, Victoria.
