= Michael Blood =

Australian rules footballer

Personal information
- Full name: Michael Blood
- Born: 5 July 1945 (age 81)
- Original team: St Kevin's Old Boys
- Height: 193 cm (6 ft 4 in)
- Weight: 89 kg (196 lb)

Playing career^{1}
Years	Club	Games (Goals)
1967–70	Hawthorn	37 (2)
- ^{1} Playing statistics correct to the end of 1970.

Michael Blood (born 5 July 1945) is a former Australian rules footballer who played with Hawthorn in the Victorian Football League (VFL).
