= Russell Whelan =

Australian rules footballer

Personal information
- Full name: Russell Whelan
- Born: 2 December 1914; Balwyn, Victoria
- Died: 21 August 1981 (aged 66); Newcastle, New South Wales
- Height: 185 cm (6 ft 1 in)
- Weight: 86 kg (190 lb)

Playing career^{1}
Years	Club	Games (Goals)
1945	Hawthorn	1 (0)
- ^{1} Playing statistics correct to the end of 1945.

Russell Whelan (2 December 1914 – 21 August 1981) was an Australian rules footballer who played with Hawthorn in the Victorian Football League (VFL).
