= Reg Naylor =

Australian rules footballer

Personal information
- Full name: Reginald Randolph Naylor
- Born: 11 November 1897; Neerim South, Victoria
- Died: 23 November 1945 (aged 48); Melbourne
- Original team: Prahran

Playing career^{1}
| Years | Club | Games (Goals) |
| 1920–1926 | Prahran (VFA) | (-) |
| 1927 | Hawthorn | 5 (3) |
- ^{1} Playing statistics correct to the end of 1927.

Reginald Randolph Naylor (11 November 1897 – 23 November 1945) was an Australian rules footballer who played with Hawthorn in the Victorian Football League (VFL).

Naylor played for Prahran for six years before joining Hawthorn in 1927, after initially being refused a permit in 1925.
