= Warren Lee (footballer) =

Australian rules footballer and businessman

Personal information
- Full name: Warren Lee
- Born: 21 May 1958 (age 68); Glen Iris, Victoria
- Original team: Collegians
- Height: 183 cm (6 ft 0 in)
- Weight: 78 kg (172 lb)

Playing career^{1}
Years	Club	Games (Goals)
1978	Hawthorn	6 (2)
- ^{1} Playing statistics correct to the end of 1978.

Warren Lee (born 21 May 1958) is an Australian businessman and former Australian rules footballer who played with Hawthorn in the Victorian Football League (VFL).

== Football career ==
Recruited from Collegians, Lee broke into the strong Hawthorn side early in the 1978 VFL season. After six senior games a knee injury put an end to his VFL career.

== Business career ==
After completing a Commerce degree at the University of Melbourne Lee embarked on a career in the Financial Services sector.

He has held the following senior roles:

- Chief Executive Officer - Victorian Funds Management Corporation (from October 2012)
- Chief Executive Officer - AXA Australia and New Zealand
- Chief Financial Officer - AXA Australia and New Zealand
- Chief Financial Officer - AXA China Region Insurance Company Limited
- Chief Operating Officer - AXA Hong Kong
- Independent Director - Tower Limited (NZ)
