= Carl Rohde =

Australian rules footballer, born 1910

Personal information
- Full name: Carl August Rohde
- Born: 29 September 1910; Avoca, Victoria
- Died: 14 May 1959 (aged 48); Bendigo, Victoria
- Height: 184 cm (6 ft 0 in)
- Weight: 86 kg (190 lb)

Playing career^{1}
Years	Club	Games (Goals)
1935	Hawthorn	4 (0)
- ^{1} Playing statistics correct to the end of 1935.

Carl August Rohde (29 September 1910 – 14 May 1959) was an Australian rules footballer who played with Hawthorn in the Victorian Football League (VFL).

== Family ==
Carl was the son of August Ashley Rohde and Jane Rohde (née Gouge). He was born in Avoca, Victoria, on 29 September 1910.

He married Elsie Jean Statham (1917–1969) in 1940.

== Death ==
Carl passed away in Bendigo, Victoria, on 14 May 1959.
