= Roy Rodda =

Australian rules footballer, born 1910

Personal information
- Full name: Roy Albert Rodda
- Born: 9 May 1910; Brunswick North, Victoria
- Died: 10 February 1978 (aged 67); Heidelberg, Victoria
- Original team: Shepparton
- Height: 163 cm (5 ft 4 in)
- Weight: 65 kg (143 lb)

Playing career^{1}
Years	Club	Games (Goals)
1933–35	Hawthorn	34 (31)
- ^{1} Playing statistics correct to the end of 1935.

Roy Albert Rodda (9 May 1910 – 10 February 1978) was an Australian rules footballer who played with Hawthorn in the Victorian Football League (VFL).

Rodda was recruited to Hawthorn from Shepparton where his father was a well known painter and decorator.

Rodda later served in the Australian Army during World War II.
