= Alan Saker =

Australian rules footballer

Personal information
- Full name: Alan Saker
- Born: 15 February 1921
- Died: 26 December 2001 (aged 80)
- Original team: Williamstown
- Height: 170 cm (5 ft 7 in)
- Weight: 71 kg (157 lb)

Playing career^{1}
Years	Club	Games (Goals)
1943	Hawthorn	2 (0)
- ^{1} Playing statistics correct to the end of 1943.

Alan Saker (15 February 1921 – 26 December 2001) was an Australian rules footballer who played for the Hawthorn Football Club in the Victorian Football League (VFL).

He played with Melbourne FC Seconds in 1940 before transferring to VFA club Williamstown in 1941, where he played just one game in the Seniors but did play in the Seconds premiership team of 1941. He returned to Williamstown in 1944 when the VFA Seconds competition resumed after the World War II recess. He never played another game in the Senior team at Williamstown.
