= Jim Don =

Australian rules footballer

Personal information
- Full name: James Alfred Don
- Born: 11 September 1930; Koo Wee Rup, Victoria
- Died: 26 March 2003 (aged 72); Port Macquarie, New South Wales
- Original team: St Columb's Church of England
- Height: 179 cm (5 ft 10 in)
- Weight: 79 kg (174 lb)

Playing career^{1}
Years	Club	Games (Goals)
1950	Hawthorn	5 (0)
- ^{1} Playing statistics correct to the end of 1950.

James Alfred Don (11 September 1930 – 26 March 2003) was an Australian rules footballer who played with Hawthorn in the Victorian Football League (VFL).

Don came to Hawthorn from the St Columb's Church of England club. He started 1950 in the Hawthorn thirds, but by round six of the 1950 VFL season had broken into the senior team and made five appearances.
