= Ken Mace =

Australian rules footballer

Personal information
- Full name: Kenneth Andrew Mace
- Born: 3 March 1921; Camberwell, Victoria
- Died: 1 April 1999 (aged 78); South Australia
- Original team: Burwood Methodists
- Height: 184 cm (6 ft 0 in)
- Weight: 86 kg (190 lb)

Playing career^{1}
Years	Club	Games (Goals)
1946–47	Hawthorn	8 (0)
1947	St Kilda	12 (0)
1948	Camberwell (VFA)	7 (1)
- ^{1} Playing statistics correct to the end of 1947.

Kenneth Andrew Mace (3 March 1921 – 1 April 1999) was an Australian rules footballer who played with Hawthorn and St Kilda in the Victorian Football League (VFL).
