= Bernie Trafford =

Australian rules footballer, born 1902

Personal information
- Full name: Bernard Leslie Trafford
- Born: 3 September 1902; Brunswick, Victoria
- Died: 17 July 1964 (aged 61); Parkville, Victoria
- Original team: East Brunswick
- Height: 179 cm (5 ft 10 in)

Playing career^{1}
Years	Club	Games (Goals)
1926–1927	Hawthorn	4 (2)
- ^{1} Playing statistics correct to the end of 1927.

Bernard Leslie Trafford (3 September 1902 – 17 July 1964) was an Australian rules footballer who played with Hawthorn in the Victorian Football League (VFL).

== Early life ==
The son of quarryman Albert Edward Trafford (1875–1955) and Margaret Ann Trafford, nee Joyce (1876–1942), Bernard Leslie Trafford was born at Brunswick on 3 September 1902.

== Football ==
Trafford joined Hawthorn from East Brunswick at the start of the 1926 VFL season and after playing for the reserves for most of the season he made his debut against Richmond in Round 15 and scored a goal on debut. Trafford played another senior game two weeks later and two more games in 1927 but never secured a regular spot in the side.

In 1928 he transferred to Preston but failed to gain a position in the senior side.

== Later life ==
Bernie Trafford married Nancy Adelaide James in 1928 and they lived in Melbourne until their separation in the late 1940s. Trafford subsequently lived with his daughter until his death in July 1964. He is buried at Fawkner Memorial Cemetery.
