= Steve Emery (Australian footballer) =

Australian rules footballer

Personal information
- Full name: Steve Emery
- Born: 15 January 1958 (age 68)
- Original team: Yallourn
- Height: 183 cm (6 ft 0 in)
- Weight: 83 kg (183 lb)

Playing career^{1}
Years	Club	Games (Goals)
1978–1979	Hawthorn	6 (0)
- ^{1} Playing statistics correct to the end of 1979.

Steve Emery (born 15 January 1958) is a former Australian rules footballer who played with Hawthorn in the Victorian Football League (VFL).
