= Rodney Robson =

Australian rules footballer (born 1946)

Personal information
- Full name: Rodney Robson
- Born: 9 April 1946
- Died: 13 April 2026 (aged 80)
- Original team: Geelong College
- Height: 183 cm (6 ft 0 in)
- Weight: 89 kg (196 lb)
- Position: Defence

Playing career^{1}
Years	Club	Games (Goals)
1966–67	Hawthorn	5 (0)
- ^{1} Playing statistics correct to the end of 1967.

Rodney Robson (9 April 1946 – 13 April 2026) was an Australian rules footballer who played with Hawthorn in the Victorian Football League (VFL).
