= Dave Leng =

Australian rules footballer

Personal information
- Full name: Dave Leng
- Born: 2 April 1946 (age 80)
- Original team: University Blacks
- Height: 188 cm (6 ft 2 in)
- Weight: 83 kg (183 lb)

Playing career^{1}
Years	Club	Games (Goals)
1967	Hawthorn	1 (0)
- ^{1} Playing statistics correct to the end of 1967.

Dave Leng (born 2 April 1946) is a former Australian rules footballer who played with Hawthorn in the Victorian Football League (VFL).
