= Ted Garside =

Australian rules footballer, born 1904

Personal information
- Full name: Edward Garside
- Born: 22 November 1904; Johannesburg, South Africa
- Died: 8 August 1983 (aged 78); Macleod, Victoria
- Original team: Black Rock

Playing career^{1}
Years	Club	Games (Goals)
1931	Hawthorn	6 (0)
- ^{1} Playing statistics correct to the end of 1931.

Edward Garside (22 November 1904 – 8 August 1983) was an Australian rules footballer who played with Hawthorn in the Victorian Football League (VFL).
