= Frank Magrath =

Australian rules footballer (1901–1974)

Personal information
- Full name: Frank Magrath
- Born: 18 May 1901; Swansea, Tasmania
- Died: 21 March 1974 (aged 72); Balwyn North, Victoria
- Height: 183 cm (6 ft 0 in)
- Weight: 77 kg (170 lb)

Playing career^{1}
Years	Club	Games (Goals)
1928	Hawthorn	1 (0)
- ^{1} Playing statistics correct to the end of 1928.

Frank Magrath (18 May 1901 – 21 March 1974) was an Australian rules footballer who played with Hawthorn in the Victorian Football League (VFL).
