= Charlie McGillivray (Australian footballer) =

Australian rules footballer

Personal information
- Full name: Charles Malcolm McGillivray
- Born: 10 July 1910; Taradale, Victoria
- Died: 28 February 1983 (aged 72); Neerim South, Victoria
- Height: 185 cm (6 ft 1 in)
- Weight: 91 kg (201 lb)

Playing career^{1}
Years	Club	Games (Goals)
1933	Hawthorn	3 (0)
- ^{1} Playing statistics correct to the end of 1933.

Charles Malcolm McGillivray (10 July 1910 – 28 February 1983) was an Australian rules footballer who played with Hawthorn in the Victorian Football League (VFL).

McGillivray later served in the Australian Army for three years during World War II.
