= Phil Wynd =

Australian rules footballer

Personal information
- Full name: Phillip Wynd
- Born: 23 January 1946 (age 80)
- Original team: St Kevin's College
- Height: 183 cm (6 ft 0 in)
- Weight: 83 kg (183 lb)

Playing career^{1}
Years	Club	Games (Goals)
1965–67	Hawthorn	11 (0)
- ^{1} Playing statistics correct to the end of 1967.

Phil Wynd (born 23 January 1946) is a former Australian rules footballer who played with Hawthorn in the Victorian Football League (VFL). Wynd's career spanned from 1965 to 1967 and played 11 games of football. His jumper number was 36.
