= Richard Browne (footballer) =

Australian rules footballer

Personal information
- Full name: Richard Browne
- Born: 27 July 1946 (age 80)
- Original team: University Blacks
- Height: 191 cm (6 ft 3 in)
- Weight: 86 kg (190 lb)

Playing career^{1}
Years	Club	Games (Goals)
1966–67, 1969	Hawthorn	16 (8)
- ^{1} Playing statistics correct to the end of 1969.

Richard Browne (born 27 July 1946) is a former Australian rules footballer who played with Hawthorn in the Victorian Football League (VFL).
