= Tom Barwick =

Australian rules footballer

Personal information
- Full name: Thomas Edward Barwick
- Born: 30 November 1907; Swan Hill, Victoria
- Died: 26 December 1939 (aged 32); Sea Lake, Victoria
- Original team: South Ballarat
- Height: 179 cm (5 ft 10 in)
- Weight: 75 kg (165 lb)

Playing career^{1}
Years	Club	Games (Goals)
1928	Hawthorn	2 (2)
- ^{1} Playing statistics correct to the end of 1928.

Thomas Edward Barwick (30 November 1907 – 26 December 1939) was an Australian rules footballer who played with Hawthorn in the Victorian Football League (VFL). He was killed in a road accident near Sea Lake at the age of 32.
