= Frank Maple =

Australian rules footballer, born 1904

Personal information
- Full name: Frank Harvey Maple
- Born: 26 October 1904; Blean, Kent, England
- Died: 29 January 1984 (aged 79); Frankston, Victoria
- Original team: Kew
- Height: 183 cm (6 ft 0 in)
- Weight: 78 kg (172 lb)
- Position: Forward

Playing career^{1}
Years	Club	Games (Goals)
1926	Hawthorn	2 (1)
- ^{1} Playing statistics correct to the end of 1926.

Frank Harvey Maple (26 October 1904 – 29 January 1984) was an Australian rules footballer who played with Hawthorn in the Victorian Football League (VFL).

== Family ==
Born Frank Harvey Marriott in Kent, England in 1904, he emigrated to Australia with his mother and brother in early 1907. Shortly afterwards his mother married Horace William Maple and Frank took the Maple name.

== Football ==
Frank Maple played football for Kew before being recruited by Hawthorn at the start of the 1926 VFL season. After two games he was dropped from the side and he did not make another senior appearance. He subsequently returned to playing for Kew in the League Sub-District competition.

== Death ==
Frank Harvey Maple died on 29 January 1984 and was cremated at Springvale Botanical Cemetery.
