= Graeme McArthur =

Australian rules footballer

Personal information
- Full name: Graeme McArthur
- Born: 21 November 1944 (age 81)
- Original team: Croydon
- Height: 177 cm (5 ft 10 in)
- Weight: 76 kg (168 lb)

Playing career^{1}
Years	Club	Games (Goals)
1963–64	Hawthorn	2 (0)
- ^{1} Playing statistics correct to the end of 1964.

Graeme McArthur (born 21 November 1944) is a former Australian rules footballer who played with Hawthorn in the Victorian Football League (VFL).
