= Ralph Duff =

Australian rules footballer, born 1908

Personal information
- Full name: Ralph Duff
- Born: 20 May 1908
- Died: 23 March 1951 (aged 42)
- Original team: Ballarat
- Height: 175 cm (5 ft 9 in)
- Weight: 74 kg (163 lb)

Playing career^{1}
Years	Club	Games (Goals)
1935	Hawthorn	1 (1)
- ^{1} Playing statistics correct to the end of 1935.

Ralph Duff (20 May 1908 – 23 March 1951) was an Australian rules footballer who played with Hawthorn in the Victorian Football League (VFL).
