= Godfrey McRae =

Australian rules footballer

Personal information
- Full name: Godfrey Kilgour McRae
- Born: 17 July 1906; Broadford, Victoria
- Died: 21 March 1979 (aged 72); Mount Waverley, Victoria
- Height: 182 cm (6 ft 0 in)

Playing career^{1}
Years	Club	Games (Goals)
1927	Hawthorn	1 (0)
- ^{1} Playing statistics correct to the end of 1927.

Godfrey Kilgour McRae (17 July 1906 – 21 March 1979) was an Australian rules footballer who played with Hawthorn in the Victorian Football League (VFL).
