= Norm Alvin =

Australian rules footballer

Personal information
- Full name: Norman Hedley Alvin
- Born: 31 May 1916; Richmond, Victoria
- Died: 11 November 2001 (aged 85)
- Original team: Brighton
- Height: 178 cm (5 ft 10 in)
- Weight: 80 kg (176 lb)

Playing career^{1}
Years	Club	Games (Goals)
1942, 1944	Hawthorn	6 (4)
- ^{1} Playing statistics correct to the end of 1944.

Norman Hedley Alvin (31 May 1916 – 11 November 2001) was an Australian rules footballer who played with Hawthorn in the Victorian Football League (VFL).
