= Tom Rowe (footballer) =

Australian rules footballer

Personal information
- Full name: Thomas Desmond Rowe
- Born: 7 January 1920; Carlton, Victoria
- Died: 3 July 2003 (aged 83)
- Original team: Noble Park / Dandenong
- Height: 185 cm (6 ft 1 in)
- Weight: 84 kg (185 lb)

Playing career^{1}
Years	Club	Games (Goals)
1942	Hawthorn	4 (0)
- ^{1} Playing statistics correct to the end of 1942.

Thomas Desmond Rowe (7 January 1920 – 3 July 2003) was an Australian rules footballer who played with Hawthorn in the Victorian Football League (VFL).

After playing four games with Hawthorn in 1942, Rowe enlisted in the Australian Army and served for the remainder of World War II.
