= Wal Romari =

Australian rules footballer, born 1907

Personal information
- Full name: Walter James Romari
- Born: 7 October 1907; Murchison, Victoria
- Died: 1 September 1962 (aged 54); Preston, Victoria
- Original team: Kilsyth

Playing career^{1}
Years	Club	Games (Goals)
1934	Hawthorn	2 (0)
- ^{1} Playing statistics correct to the end of 1934.

Walter James Romari (7 October 1907 – 1 September 1962) was an Australian rules footballer who played with Hawthorn in the Victorian Football League (VFL).
