= Garry Rasmussen =

Australian rules footballer

Personal information
- Full name: Garry Rasmussen
- Born: 28 November 1937 (age 88)
- Original team: Hawthorn City
- Height: 187 cm (6 ft 2 in)
- Weight: 80 kg (176 lb)

Playing career^{1}
Years	Club	Games (Goals)
1958–59	Hawthorn	7 (3)
- ^{1} Playing statistics correct to the end of 1959.

Garry Rasmussen (born 28 November 1937) is a former Australian rules footballer who played with Hawthorn in the Victorian Football League (VFL).
