= Bill Cocks =

Australian rules footballer

Personal information
- Full name: William Roy Cocks
- Born: 15 December 1936
- Died: 17 August 2011 (aged 74)
- Original team: Swan Districts
- Height: 170 cm (5 ft 7 in)
- Weight: 78 kg (172 lb)

Playing career^{1}
Years	Club	Games (Goals)
1954-57	Swan Districts	25 (3)
1960	Hawthorn	1 (0)
- ^{1} Playing statistics correct to the end of 1960.

William Roy Cocks (15 December 1936 – 17 August 2011) was an Australian rules footballer who played with Swan Districts in the West Australian Football League (WAFL) and Hawthorn in the Victorian Football League (VFL).
