= Frank Luckins =

Australian rules footballer, born 1912

Personal information
- Full name: Frank Seymour Luckins
- Born: 24 April 1912; Boisdale, Victoria
- Died: 1 July 1998 (aged 86); Montrose, Victoria
- Original team: Bairnsdale

Playing career^{1}
Years	Club	Games (Goals)
1932	Hawthorn	1 (0)
- ^{1} Playing statistics correct to the end of 1932.

Frank Seymour Luckins (24 April 1912 – 1 July 1998) was an Australian rules footballer who played with Hawthorn in the Victorian Football League (VFL).
