= Howard Day =

Australian rules footballer, born 1917

Personal information
- Full name: Howard Maxwell Day
- Born: 10 August 1917; Yackandandah, Victoria
- Died: 9 March 1998 (aged 80)
- Original team: Collegians
- Height: 177 cm (5 ft 10 in)
- Weight: 73 kg (161 lb)

Playing career^{1}
Years	Club	Games (Goals)
1939	Hawthorn	3 (6)
- ^{1} Playing statistics correct to the end of 1939.

Howard Maxwell Day (10 August 1917 – 9 March 1998) was an Australian rules footballer who played with Hawthorn in the Victorian Football League (VFL).

Day later served in the Australian Army during World War II.
