= Bob Neate =

Australian rules footballer

Personal information
- Full name: Robert James Neate
- Born: 31 January 1925; Hawthorn, Victoria
- Died: 20 February 2010 (aged 85)
- Height: 170 cm (5 ft 7 in)
- Weight: 64 kg (141 lb)

Playing career^{1}
Years	Club	Games (Goals)
1946	Hawthorn	1 (0)
- ^{1} Playing statistics correct to the end of 1946.

Robert James Neate (31 January 1925 – 20 February 2010) was an Australian rules footballer who played with Hawthorn in the Victorian Football League (VFL).

Neate served in the Australian Army during World War II.
