= Ross Growcott =

Australian rules footballer

Personal information
- Full name: Ross Growcott
- Born: 24 May 1945
- Original team: Box Hill High School
- Height: 187 cm (6 ft 2 in)
- Weight: 89 kg (196 lb)
- Position: Halfback

Playing career^{1}
Years	Club	Games (Goals)
1963–70	Hawthorn	53 (2)
- ^{1} Playing statistics correct to the end of 1970.

Ross Growcott (born 24 May 1945) is a former Australian rules footballer who played with Hawthorn in the Victorian Football League (VFL).
