= Stan Petrie =

Australian rules footballer, born 1906

Personal information
- Full name: Stanley Alexander Petrie
- Born: 15 September 1906; South Melbourne, Victoria
- Died: 22 February 1979 (aged 72); Glen Huntly, Victoria
- Height: 183 cm (6 ft 0 in)
- Weight: 77 kg (170 lb)

Playing career^{1}
Years	Club	Games (Goals)
1928	Hawthorn	3 (3)
- ^{1} Playing statistics correct to the end of 1928.

Stanley Alexander Petrie (15 September 1906 – 22 February 1979) was an Australian rules footballer who played with Hawthorn in the Victorian Football League (VFL).

== Football ==
Recruited from Carnegie in the Sub Districts FL where he kicked 50 goals in 1927 he played three games for the Mayblooms.

He played for Camberwell from 1930 to 1932, Traralgon in 1933 and was back at Camberwell for 1934. After a Port Melbourne match he quit siting dismay at the club and was cleared to Prahran.

In 1936 he was appointed captain-coach of the Darling Football Club in the Federal FL.
