= Rob Brady =

Australian rules footballer

Personal information
- Full name: Robert Emmett Brady
- Born: 17 May 1901; Richmond, Victoria
- Died: 3 July 1976 (aged 75); Fitzroy, Victoria
- Original team: Richmond CYMS (CYMSFA)

Playing career^{1}
Years	Club	Games (Goals)
1922–1923	Richmond	2 (0)
1928	Hawthorn	4 (1)
Total		6 (1)
- ^{1} Playing statistics correct to the end of 1928.

Robert Emmett Brady (17 May 1901 – 3 July 1976) was an Australian rules footballer who played with Richmond and Hawthorn in the Victorian Football League (VFL).
