= Bob Herbert (footballer) =

Australian rules footballer

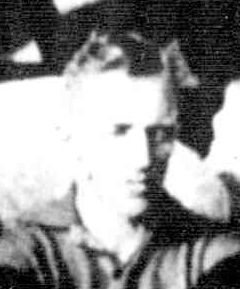

Personal information
- Full name: Bob Herbert
- Born: 11 March 1919
- Died: 16 January 2004 (aged 84)
- Original team: Kew

Playing career^{1}
Years	Club	Games (Goals)
1941–42	Hawthorn	5 (2)
1943–44	Melbourne	27 (38)
Total		32 (40)
- ^{1} Playing statistics correct to the end of 1944.

Bob Herbert (11 March 1919 – 16 January 2004) was a former Australian rules footballer who played with Hawthorn and Melbourne in the Victorian Football League (VFL).
