= Max Jose =

Australian rules footballer

Personal information
- Full name: Max Jose
- Born: 16 August 1935 (age 91)
- Original team: Glenhuntly
- Height: 187 cm (6 ft 2 in)
- Weight: 89 kg (196 lb)

Playing career^{1}
Years	Club	Games (Goals)
1953–57	Hawthorn	25 (3)
- ^{1} Playing statistics correct to the end of 1957.

Max Jose (born 16 August 1935) is a former Australian rules footballer who played with Hawthorn in the Victorian Football League (VFL).
