= Kevin Woodward =

Australian rules footballer

Personal information
- Full name: Kevin Woodward
- Born: 24 October 1942 (age 84)
- Original team: Nunawading High School
- Height: 177 cm (5 ft 10 in)
- Weight: 75 kg (165 lb)

Playing career^{1}
Years	Club	Games (Goals)
1962–64	Hawthorn	10 (0)
- ^{1} Playing statistics correct to the end of 1964.

Kevin Woodward (born 24 October 1942) is a former Australian rules footballer who played with Hawthorn in the Victorian Football League (VFL).
