= Gilbert Cartwright =

Australian rules footballer

Personal information
- Full name: Gilbert Edwin Cartwright
- Born: 18 April 1916; Sandringham, Victoria
- Died: 10 May 2002 (aged 86)
- Original team: Sandringham
- Height: 165 cm (5 ft 5 in)
- Weight: 66 kg (146 lb)

Playing career^{1}
Years	Club	Games (Goals)
1938	Hawthorn	7 (12)
- ^{1} Playing statistics correct to the end of 1938.

Gilbert Edwin Cartwright (18 April 1916 – 10 May 2002) was an Australian rules footballer who played with Hawthorn in the Victorian Football League (VFL).
