= Leon Toohey =

Australian rules footballer

Personal information
- Full name: Leon Toohey
- Born: 2 November 1934
- Died: 4 July 2000 (aged 65)
- Original team: Hawthorn City
- Height: 168 cm (5 ft 6 in)
- Weight: 68 kg (150 lb)

Playing career^{1}
Years	Club	Games (Goals)
1955	Hawthorn	2 (0)
- ^{1} Playing statistics correct to the end of 1955.

Leon Toohey (2 November 1934 – 4 July 2000) was an Australian rules footballer who played with Hawthorn in the Victorian Football League (VFL).
