= Greg Burgess (footballer) =

Australian rules footballer

Personal information
- Full name: Greg Burgess
- Born: 8 August 1945 (age 81)
- Original team: Box Hill
- Height: 188 cm (6 ft 2 in)
- Weight: 83 kg (183 lb)

Playing career^{1}
Years	Club	Games (Goals)
1965–66	Hawthorn	4 (0)
- ^{1} Playing statistics correct to the end of 1966.

Greg Burgess (born 8 August 1945) is a former Australian rules footballer who played with Hawthorn in the Victorian Football League (VFL).
