= Frank Prowse =

Australian rules footballer

Personal information
- Full name: Francis Joseph Prowse
- Born: 4 August 1923; South Melbourne, Victoria
- Died: 13 May 1999 (aged 75)
- Height: 192 cm (6 ft 4 in)
- Weight: 94 kg (207 lb)

Playing career^{1}
Years	Club	Games (Goals)
1947	South Melbourne	1 (0)
1949–50	Hawthorn	20 (6)
Total		21 (6)
- ^{1} Playing statistics correct to the end of 1950.

Francis Joseph Prowse (4 August 1923 – 13 May 1999) was an Australian rules footballer who played with South Melbourne and Hawthorn in the Victorian Football League (VFL).

Prowse served as a sapper in the Australian Army during World War II prior to his football career.
