= Stephen Jolley =

Australian rules footballer

Personal information
- Full name: Stephen Jolley
- Born: 12 February 1950 (age 76)
- Original team: Dromana
- Height: 188 cm (6 ft 2 in)
- Weight: 82 kg (181 lb)

Playing career^{1}
Years	Club	Games (Goals)
1970	Hawthorn	2 (0)
- ^{1} Playing statistics correct to the end of 1970.

Stephen Jolley (born 12 February 1950) is a former Australian rules footballer who played with Hawthorn in the Victorian Football League (VFL).
