= Keith Molloy =

Australian rules footballer

Personal information
- Full name: Keith Molloy
- Born: 7 August 1924
- Died: 31 January 2005 (aged 80)
- Original team: Melbourne High School
- Height: 183 cm (6 ft 0 in)
- Weight: 82.5 kg (182 lb)
- Position: Centre half back

Playing career^{1}
| Years | Club | Games (Goals) |
| 1943, 1945 | Melbourne | 12 (0) |
| 1946–49 | Hawthorn | 12 (0) |
| Total | | 24 (0) |
- ^{1} Playing statistics correct to the end of 1949.

Keith Molloy (7 August 1924 – 31 January 2005) was an Australian rules footballer who played with Melbourne and Hawthorn in the Victorian Football League (VFL).
