= Graeme Spark (footballer) =

Australian rules footballer

Personal information
- Full name: Graeme Spark
- Born: 8 October 1957 (age 69)
- Original team: Chadstone
- Height: 182 cm (6 ft 0 in)
- Weight: 75 kg (165 lb)

Playing career^{1}
Years	Club	Games (Goals)
1976	Hawthorn	2 (3)
- ^{1} Playing statistics correct to the end of 1976.

Graeme Spark (born 8 October 1957) is a former Australian rules footballer who played with Hawthorn in the Victorian Football League (VFL).
