= Wes Smith (Australian footballer) =

Australian footballer

Personal information
- Full name: Wes Smith
- Born: 17 August 1945 (age 81)
- Original team: Nathalia
- Height: 177 cm (5 ft 10 in)
- Weight: 70 kg (154 lb)

Playing career^{1}
Years	Club	Games (Goals)
1965–67	Hawthorn	28 (21)
- ^{1} Playing statistics correct to the end of 1967.

Wes Smith (born 17 August 1945) is a former Australian rules footballer who played with Hawthorn in the Victorian Football League (VFL).
