= Ernie Sheil =

Australian rules footballer, born 1906

Personal information
- Full name: Ernest Richard Glenister Sheil
- Born: 2 May 1906; Carlton, Victoria
- Died: 26 December 1970 (aged 64); Ballarat, Victoria
- Original team: University Blues
- Height: 179 cm (5 ft 10 in)
- Weight: 76 kg (168 lb)

Playing career^{1}
Years	Club	Games (Goals)
1929–30	Carlton	7 (3)
1930	Hawthorn	5 (0)
Total		12 (3)
- ^{1} Playing statistics correct to the end of 1930.

Ernest Richard Glenister Sheil (2 May 1906 – 26 December 1970) was an Australian rules footballer who played with Carlton and Hawthorn in the Victorian Football League (VFL).
