= Alvan Whittle =

Australian rules footballer, born 1919

Personal information
- Full name: Alvan Ernest Whittle
- Born: 20 September 1919; Cottesloe, Western Australia
- Died: 28 September 2008 (aged 89)
- Original team: East Perth
- Height: 182 cm (6 ft 0 in)
- Weight: 85 kg (187 lb)

Playing career^{1}
Years	Club	Games (Goals)
1944	Hawthorn	1 (0)
- ^{1} Playing statistics correct to the end of 1944.

Alvan Ernest Whittle (20 September 1919 – 28 September 2008) was an Australian rules footballer who played for the Hawthorn Football Club in the Victorian Football League (VFL).
