= Laurie Peters =

Australian rules footballer, born 1916

Personal information
- Full name: Laurence Peters
- Born: 13 June 1916; Kew, Victoria
- Died: 29 July 2011 (aged 95)
- Height: 183 cm (6 ft 0 in)
- Weight: 80 kg (176 lb)

Playing career^{1}
Years	Club	Games (Goals)
1940–44	Hawthorn	24 (0)
- ^{1} Playing statistics correct to the end of 1944.

Laurence Peters (13 June 1916 – 29 July 2011) was an Australian rules footballer who played with Hawthorn in the Victorian Football League (VFL).
