= Keith Sharpley =

Australian rules footballer

Personal information
- Full name: Keith Gordon Sharpley
- Born: 16 March 1909; Maffra, Victoria
- Died: 12 September 1970 (aged 61); Heidelberg, Victoria
- Original team: Kerang
- Height: 183 cm (6 ft 0 in)
- Weight: 84 kg (185 lb)
- Position: Half Forward

Playing career^{1}
Years	Club	Games (Goals)
1930–1933	Hawthorn	54 (40)
- ^{1} Playing statistics correct to the end of 1933.

Keith Gordon Sharpley (16 March 1909 – 12 September 1970) was an Australian rules footballer who played with Hawthorn in the Victorian Football League (VFL).
