= Tom Ferguson (footballer) =

Australian rules footballer

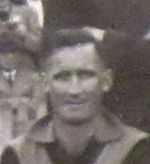

Personal information
- Full name: Thomas Ferguson
- Born: 21 November 1920
- Died: 29 May 2008 (aged 87)
- Original team: Burnley Juniors
- Height: 180 cm (5 ft 11 in)
- Weight: 82.5 kg (182 lb)
- Position: Ruck / Forward

Playing career^{1}
Years	Club	Games (Goals)
1942–43	Melbourne	14 (8)
1946–48	Hawthorn	38 (17)
Total		52 (25)
- ^{1} Playing statistics correct to the end of 1948.

Thomas Ferguson (21 November 1920 – 29 May 2008) was an Australian rules footballer who played with Melbourne and Hawthorn in the Victorian Football League (VFL).
