= Harry Dwan =

Australian rules footballer

Personal information
- Full name: Harry Peter Dwan
- Born: 8 December 1918; Daylesford, Victoria
- Died: 5 August 2010 (aged 91)
- Height: 168 cm (5 ft 6 in)
- Weight: 70 kg (154 lb)

Playing career^{1}
Years	Club	Games (Goals)
1942	Richmond	1 (0)
1944	Hawthorn	4 (0)
Total		5 (0)
- ^{1} Playing statistics correct to the end of 1944.

Harry Peter Dwan (8 December 1918 – 5 August 2010) was an Australian rules footballer who played with Richmond and Hawthorn in the Victorian Football League (VFL).
