= Brendan McFaull =

Australian rules footballer

Personal information
- Full name: Brendan McFaull
- Born: 8 May 1957 (age 69)
- Original team: Prahran (VFA)
- Height: 194 cm (6 ft 4 in)
- Weight: 96 kg (212 lb)

Playing career^{1}
Years	Club	Games (Goals)
1979	Hawthorn	2 (1)
- ^{1} Playing statistics correct to the end of 1979.

Brendan McFaull (born 8 May 1957) is a former Australian rules footballer who played with Hawthorn in the Victorian Football League (VFL).

Recruited by Prahran from St Kevin's College in 1975, McFaull played 69 games with the Two Blues either side of a short period with Hawthorn. At the end of 1981, he moved to Western Australia and joined East Fremantle.
