= Tom Calwell =

Australian rules footballer

Personal information
- Full name: Tom Calwell
- Born: 2 February 1925
- Died: 4 July 2004 (aged 79)
- Height: 179 cm (5 ft 10 in)
- Weight: 76 kg (168 lb)

Playing career^{1}
Years	Club	Games (Goals)
1946–47	Hawthorn	4 (0)
- ^{1} Playing statistics correct to the end of 1947.

Tom Calwell (2 February 1925 – 4 July 2004) was an Australian rules footballer who played with Hawthorn in the Victorian Football League (VFL).
