= Bruce Hone =

Australian rules footballer, born 1913

Personal information
- Full name: Lyle Bruce Mcpherson Hone
- Born: 26 July 1913; Brighton, Victoria
- Died: 13 June 1946 (aged 32); Prahran, Victoria
- Height: 183 cm (6 ft 0 in)
- Weight: 84 kg (185 lb)

Playing career^{1}
Years	Club	Games (Goals)
1936–39	Brighton (VFA)	40 (32)
1940	Hawthorn	5 (3)
- ^{1} Playing statistics correct to the end of 1940.

Lyle Bruce Mcpherson Hone (26 July 1913 – 13 June 1946) was an Australian rules footballer who played with Hawthorn in the Victorian Football League (VFL).

== Family ==
The son of Thomas Colin Hone (1883–1951), and Margaret Pearl Hone (1888–1965), née Johnson, Lyle Bruce McPherson Hone was born at Brighton, Victoria on 26 July 1913.

He married Olive Maude Duell (1910–1985), later Mrs. Albert Eddy McGill, in 1937.

== Military service ==
He enlisted in the Second AIF on 12 July 1941.

== Death ==
He died at the Alfred Hospital, Prahran, Victoria, on 13 June 1946.
