= Max Carmichael =

Australian rules footballer (1920–1987)

Personal information
- Full name: Malcolm Duncan Carmichael
- Born: 20 April 1920; Hastings, Victoria
- Died: 11 December 1987 (aged 67); Melbourne, Victoria
- Original team: Hastings-Tyabb (PFL)
- Height: 177 cm (5 ft 10 in)
- Weight: 67 kg (148 lb)

Playing career^{1}
Years	Club	Games (Goals)
1940	Hawthorn	2 (3)
- ^{1} Playing statistics correct to the end of 1940.

Malcolm Duncan "Max" Carmichael (20 April 1920 – 11 December 1987) was an Australian rules footballer who played with Hawthorn in the Victorian Football League (VFL).

Recruited from Hastings-Tyabb in the Peninsula Football League, where he scored 92 goals in the 1938 season, Carmichael scored three goals on his debut but did not score again.
