= Geoff Barwick =

Australian rules footballer, born 1919

Personal information
- Full name: Geoffrey Herbert Barwick
- Born: 29 September 1919; Hobart, Tasmania
- Died: 7 September 2004 (aged 84)
- Original team: New Norfolk
- Height: 187 cm (6 ft 2 in)
- Weight: 89 kg (196 lb)

Playing career^{1}
Years	Club	Games (Goals)
1945	Hawthorn	19 (14)
- ^{1} Playing statistics correct to the end of 1945.

Geoffrey Herbert Barwick (29 September 1919 – 7 September 2004) was an Australian rules footballer who played with Hawthorn in the Victorian Football League (VFL).

Prior to playing with Hawthorn, Barwick served for 18 months in the Australian Army during World War II.
