= Frank Cutter =

Australian rules footballer

Personal information
- Full name: Frank Cutter
- Born: 25 February 1921
- Died: 2 February 2009 (aged 87)
- Original team: Balwyn Church of Christ
- Height: 183 cm (6 ft 0 in)
- Weight: 79 kg (174 lb)

Playing career^{1}
| Years | Club | Games (Goals) |
| 1941 | Hawthorn | 3 (1) |
- ^{1} Playing statistics correct to the end of 1941.

Frank Cutter (25 February 1921 – 2 February 2009) was an Australian rules footballer who played with Hawthorn in the Victorian Football League (VFL).
