= Lance Morton =

Australian rules footballer

Personal information
- Full name: Lance Morton
- Born: 14 April 1948 (age 78)
- Original team: Canterbury Methodists
- Height: 192 cm (6 ft 4 in)
- Weight: 96 kg (212 lb)

Playing career^{1}
Years	Club	Games (Goals)
1968–70	Hawthorn	36 (26)
1972	South Melbourne	12 (23)
1973-74	North Adelaide	13 (15)
Total		61 (64)
- ^{1} Playing statistics correct to the end of 1972.

Lance Morton (born 14 April 1948) is a former Australian rules footballer who played with Hawthorn and South Melbourne in the Victorian Football League (VFL) and North Adelaide Football Club in the South Australian National Football League (SANFL).
