= Michael Francis (footballer) =

Australian rules footballer (1947–2019)

Personal information
- Full name: Michael George Francis
- Born: 1 May 1947
- Died: 7 March 2019 (aged 71); Tolga, Queensland
- Original team: Bonbeach
- Height: 199 cm (6 ft 6 in)
- Weight: 99 kg (218 lb)

Playing career^{1}
Years	Club	Games (Goals)
1968–70	Hawthorn	7 (2)
- ^{1} Playing statistics correct to the end of 1970.

Michael Francis (1 May 1947 – 7 March 2019) was an Australian rules footballer who played with Hawthorn in the Victorian Football League (VFL).
