= Len Yemm =

Australian rules footballer, born 1904

Personal information
- Full name: Leonard Middleton Yemm
- Born: 23 March 1904; Maldon, Victoria
- Died: 30 October 1973 (aged 69)
- Original team: Carnegie
- Height: 185 cm (6 ft 1 in)
- Weight: 81 kg (179 lb)

Playing career^{1}
Years	Club	Games (Goals)
1929–30	Hawthorn	26 (7)
- ^{1} Playing statistics correct to the end of 1930.

Leonard Middleton Yemm (23 March 1904 – 30 October 1973) was an Australian rules footballer who played with Hawthorn in the Victorian Football League (VFL).
