= Geoff Stafford =

Australian rules footballer

Personal information
- Full name: Geoff Stafford
- Born: 17 March 1945 (age 81)
- Original team: Box Hill
- Height: 178 cm (5 ft 10 in)
- Weight: 81 kg (179 lb)

Playing career^{1}
Years	Club	Games (Goals)
1966	Hawthorn	7 (2)
- ^{1} Playing statistics correct to the end of 1966.

Geoff Stafford (born 17 March 1945) is a former Australian rules footballer who played with Hawthorn in the Victorian Football League (VFL).
