= Tom Wellington (footballer, born 1921) =

Australian rules footballer (1921–1998)

Personal information
- Full name: Tom Wellington
- Born: 22 August 1921
- Died: 16 March 1998 (aged 76)
- Original team: Riddell

Playing career^{1}
Years	Club	Games (Goals)
1939–40	Hawthorn	14 (3)
- ^{1} Playing statistics correct to the end of 1940.

Tom Wellington (22 August 1921 – 16 March 1998) was an Australian rules footballer who played with Hawthorn in the Victorian Football League (VFL).

He was selected to play in the final round of the 1938 season, but withdrew due to illness and didn't make his senior debut until the following year.
