= Jack Marr =

Australian rules footballer (1928–2002)

Personal information
- Full name: Jack Marr
- Born: 15 January 1928
- Died: 14 April 2002 (aged 74)
- Height: 185 cm (6 ft 1 in)
- Weight: 85 kg (187 lb)

Playing career^{1}
Years	Club	Games (Goals)
1948–49, 1951–53	Hawthorn	33 (15)
- ^{1} Playing statistics correct to the end of 1953.

Jack Marr (15 January 1928 – 14 April 2002) was an Australian rules footballer who played with Hawthorn in the Victorian Football League (VFL).
