= Jack Mathisen =

Australian rules footballer (1921–1983)

Personal information
- Full name: John Howard Mathisen
- Born: 22 September 1921; Sorrento, Victoria
- Died: 17 December 1983 (aged 62); Camberwell, Victoria
- Height: 178 cm (5 ft 10 in)
- Weight: 76 kg (168 lb)

Playing career^{1}
Years	Club	Games (Goals)
1942	Hawthorn	2 (0)
- ^{1} Playing statistics correct to the end of 1942.

John Howard Mathisen (22 September 1921 – 17 December 1983) was an Australian rules footballer who played with Hawthorn in the Victorian Football League (VFL).
