= Norm Wells (Australian footballer) =

Australian rules footballer, born 1905

Personal information
- Full name: Frederick Norman Wells
- Born: 23 March 1905; Numurkah
- Died: 18 November 1963 (aged 58); Canterbury, Victoria
- Original team: Cohuna

Playing career^{1}
Years	Club	Games (Goals)
1927	Hawthorn	2 (0)
- ^{1} Playing statistics correct to the end of 1927.

Frederick Norman Wells (23 March 1905 – 18 November 1963) was an Australian rules footballer who played with Hawthorn in the Victorian Football League (VFL).
