= Ralph Taylor (footballer) =

Australian rules footballer

Personal information
- Full name: Ralph John Taylor
- Born: 3 June 1915; Malvern, Victoria
- Died: 21 June 2012 (aged 97); Donvale, Victoria
- Original team: Kew United Churches
- Height: 178 cm (5 ft 10 in)
- Weight: 83 kg (183 lb)

Playing career^{1}
Years	Club	Games (Goals)
1937	Hawthorn	2 (0)
- ^{1} Playing statistics correct to the end of 1937.

Ralph John Taylor (3 June 1915 – 21 June 2012) was an Australian rules footballer who played with Hawthorn in the Victorian Football League (VFL).
