= Malcolm Worrall =

Australian rules footballer (1925–2011)

Personal information
- Full name: Malcolm Murray Worrall
- Born: 10 December 1925
- Died: 19 January 2011 (aged 85)
- Original team: Parkside
- Height: 173 cm (5 ft 8 in)
- Weight: 68 kg (150 lb)
- Position: Wing

Playing career^{1}
Years	Club	Games (Goals)
1944–50	Hawthorn	80 (9)
- ^{1} Playing statistics correct to the end of 1950.

Malcolm Murray Worrall (10 December 1925 – 19 January 2011) was an Australian rules footballer who played with Hawthorn in the Victorian Football League (VFL). He died on 19 January 2011, at the age of 85.
