= Ron Paternoster =

Australian rules footballer, born 1916

Personal information
- Full name: Ronald Paternoster
- Born: 20 August 1916; Benalla, Victoria
- Died: 21 August 2002 (aged 86); Frankston, Victoria
- Original team: Seddon
- Height: 184 cm (6 ft 0 in)
- Weight: 84 kg (185 lb)

Playing career^{1}
Years	Club	Games (Goals)
1937	Footscray	1 (0)
1938	Hawthorn	1 (0)
Total		2 (0)
- ^{1} Playing statistics correct to the end of 1938.

Ronald Paternoster (20 August 1916 – 21 August 2002) was an Australian rules footballer who played with Footscray and Hawthorn in the Victorian Football League (VFL).

Paternoster later served in the Australian Army during World War II.
