= Roly Tasker =

Australian rules footballer, born 1907

Personal information
- Full name: Roland Frederick Tasker
- Born: 28 August 1907; Hopetoun, Victoria
- Died: 29 August 1972 (aged 65); Moorabbin, Victoria
- Original team: Echuca
- Height: 169 cm (5 ft 7 in)
- Weight: 67 kg (148 lb)

Playing career^{1}
Years	Club	Games (Goals)
1928–29	Hawthorn	21 (10)
- ^{1} Playing statistics correct to the end of 1929.

Roland Frederick Tasker (28 August 1907 – 29 August 1972) was an Australian rules footballer who played with Hawthorn in the Victorian Football League (VFL).

Tasker later served in the Australian Army during World War II.
