= Ted Williams (Australian footballer) =

Australian rules footballer

Personal information
- Full name: Ted Williams
- Born: 23 May 1912
- Died: 25 July 1964 (aged 52)
- Original team: Maryborough
- Height: 178 cm (5 ft 10 in)
- Weight: 71 kg (157 lb)

Playing career^{1}
Years	Club	Games (Goals)
1935	Hawthorn	4 (0)
- ^{1} Playing statistics correct to the end of 1935.

Ted Williams (23 May 1912 – 25 July 1964) was an Australian rules footballer who played with Hawthorn in the Victorian Football League (VFL).
