= Ken Dyer (Australian footballer) =

Australian rules footballer, born 1915

Personal information
- Full name: Ken Dyer
- Born: 22 October 1915
- Died: 15 May 2006 (aged 90)
- Height: 183 cm (6 ft 0 in)
- Weight: 78 kg (172 lb)

Playing career^{1}
| Years | Club | Games (Goals) |
| 1941 | Hawthorn | 4 (0) |
- ^{1} Playing statistics correct to the end of 1941.

Ken Dyer (22 October 1915 – 15 May 2006) was an Australian rules footballer who played with Hawthorn in the Victorian Football League (VFL).

Dyer played with Bacchus Marsh in 1949.
