= Ron Alsop =

Australian rules footballer

Personal information
- Full name: Ronald Alsop
- Born: 25 April 1916; Malvern, Victoria
- Died: 28 August 1970 (aged 54); Burwood, Victoria
- Original team: Port Melbourne
- Height: 168 cm (5 ft 6 in)
- Weight: 65 kg (143 lb)

Playing career^{1}
Years	Club	Games (Goals)
1944	Hawthorn	2 (0)
- ^{1} Playing statistics correct to the end of 1944.

Ronald Alsop (25 April 1916 – 28 August 1970) was an Australian rules footballer who played with Hawthorn in the Victorian Football League (VFL).
