= Peter Hancock (footballer) =

Australian rules footballer (1931–2020)

Personal information
- Full name: Peter David Hancock
- Born: 11 November 1931
- Died: 17 May 2020 (aged 88)
- Original team: Hartwell Presbyterians
- Height: 183 cm (6 ft 0 in)
- Weight: 80 kg (176 lb)

Playing career^{1}
Years	Club	Games (Goals)
1950–52	Hawthorn	26 (16)
- ^{1} Playing statistics correct to the end of 1952.

Peter David Hancock (11 November 1931 – 17 May 2020) was an Australian rules footballer who played with Hawthorn in the Victorian Football League (VFL).
