= Camberwell Football Club =

Former Australian rules football club

Names
- Full name: Camberwell Amateur Football Club
- Nickname(s): Tricolours, Cobras, Wells

Club details
- Founded: Mid-1880s
- Dissolved: 1995; 31 years ago
- Colours: Blue White Red
- Premierships: RDFA (4): 1907; 1908; 1909; 1911; MDFL (3): 1921; 1922; 1923; VFA (D2) (2): 1979; 1981
- Ground: Camberwell Sports Ground

Uniforms
Home

The Camberwell Football Club, nicknamed the Cobras, was an Australian rules football club based in the Melbourne suburb of Camberwell. The club competed in the Victorian Football Association (VFA) from 1926 until 1990, which was followed by three seasons in the Victorian Amateur Football Association (VAFA) before going into recess in 1995.

== History ==
=== Early years ===
Camberwell was formed in 1886 and joined the Victorian Junior Football Association (VJFA), with its earliest-recorded match on 1 May 1886 against Hawthorn Juniors.

The club finished sixth on the ladder in 1889, eighth in 1890, and eighth in 1891. At the 1895 VJFA AGM, the competition was reduced from 20 teams to 12 teams and Camberwell was one of the clubs that was not admitted and it appears that Camberwell FC went into recess for a number of years, before joining the Eastern Suburbs Football Association (ESFA) in 1899 and the Reporter District Football Association (RDFA) in 1905.

In 1912, Camberwell went into recess again, with their players being distributed to the Burwood and Kew football clubs. In 1913, the club was readmitted into the VJFA, rated by many as the third highest grade of football in Victoria at that time.

Camberwell won a three-peat in the Melbourne District Football Association (MDFA) from 1921 until 1923, with the latter grand final held as a curtain-raiser at the Melbourne Cricket Ground before Essendon played South Melbourne in the second Victorian Football League (VFL) semi-final.

In its earliest years, the club was playing at Camberwell Junction (the corner of Burke and Riversdale Roads); the space that became the home of the Camberwell Football Club for 80 years (eventually known as "Camberwell Sports Ground") was originally a vegetable garden ("Brooks Paddock") and part of Camberwell Racecourse. The preparation of a new sports ground (originally dubbed "Bowen Park") on this site was finished in 1909 and Camberwell Football Club first played at the new ground the following year (1910). A grandstand for visitors' rooms (the "Tramways Grandstand") was built in 1920. A much larger spectators' grandstand and pavilion was built in 1935 – and ready for the 1936 football season.

=== VFA ===
After establishing itself as a successful junior and sub-district club, Camberwell was seen by the 1920s as a likely strong fit for expansions into the eastern suburbs of either the Victorian Football League (VFL) or the Victorian Football Association (VFA). It lodged applications to join both at different times during the early 1920s, and was admitted to the VFA for the 1926 season. It reached its first Grand Final in 1935, losing by nine points to Yarraville.

With the introduction of throw-pass football to the VFA in 1938, the club made one of the VFA's most significant ever recruiting coups when it recruited champion VFL player Laurie Nash for a huge salary of £8/wk. Following World War II, Camberwell won its first and only top division minor premiership in 1946, but lost in the Grand Final against Sandringham by seven points.

Following the end of the throw-pass era in 1950, Camberwell became one of several weaker VFA clubs who struggled throughout the 1950s. The club was operating as amateur in 1953 due to lack of funds, and it faced pressure to hold its lease at the Camberwell Sports Ground from local soccer clubs who could offer the council more money. It was generally near the bottom of the ladder, and found itself in Division 2 when the Association was partitioned in 1961. The club remained weak throughout the 1960s.

The club improved through the early 1970s, and became a regular Division 2 finalist from 1973. The club played in losing Grand Finals in 1975 against Brunswick and in 1978 against Frankston, before winning its first premiership in 1979, defeating Oakleigh by 38 points. Promoted to Division 1 for the first time, the club was relegated after one season, but won the Division 2 premiership again in 1981, defeating Waverley by 32 points in the Grand Final. In the next few years, Camberwell was considered one of the boom clubs of the VFA, and in 1984 it reached the Division 1 finals for the first time since the 1940s.

Camberwell's position deteriorated abruptly in 1985. Struggling financially, as many VFA clubs were, it asked its players to take a pay cut at the start of the season; but, still unable to make its player payments, senior players began to walk out on the club at midseason. Within a year, there had been an exodus of more than forty players, plus the club was left with a large damage bill after a grandstand fire. The inexperienced team which remained was winless with a percentage of only 30.1 in 1986, including suffering a VFA-record loss against Williamstown by 315 points, and was relegated. The club was more competitive in Division 2, but endured two consecutive winless seasons after the competition was recombined into a single division in 1989. (Note: Camberwell defeated Sunshine by 51 points in round 3 of the 1989 VFA season, but the result was expunged after Sunshine withdrew from the season following round 9.) After pre-season form indicated the club would be even less competitive in 1991, the club dropped out of the VFA a couple of weeks prior to the start of the season.

=== VAFA ===
Camberwell hoped to regroup and rejoin the VFA in 1992, but this did not eventuate. Instead, the club joined the Victorian Amateur Football Association (VAFA) as Camberwell Amateurs for the 1992 VAFA season, competing in the G North section. Although the club finished fifth at the end of the season and did not make the finals series, they were promoted to F2 Section in 1993, in which they finished second-last with only three wins. The club played at Rathmines Road Reserve in Hawthorn East during the 1993 season.

Camberwell's final season was in 1994 in the Club XVIII North section (formerly known as G Section North), with the club winning its final game against North Old Boys. In the summer of 1995, Camberwell went into recess and folded later that year.

== Honours ==
=== Club records ===
Highest Score	43.22 (280) v Yarraville, Round 4, 1981, Camberwell Sportsground
Lowest Score	1.8 (14) v Oakleigh, Round 9, 1959, Camberwell Sportsground
Greatest Winning Margin	193 points v Yarraville, Round 4, 1981, Camberwell Sportsground
Greatest Losing Margin	315 points v Williamstown, Round 16, 1986, Camberwell Sportsground
Lowest Winning Score	6.10 (46) v Brunswick 6.9 (45), Round 3, 1928, Brunswick Park
Highest Losing Score	20.24 (144) v Preston 21.19 (145), Round 20, 1940, Camberwell Sportsground

- Most goals in a season: 141 - Laurie Nash in 1941
- Most Consecutive games in a row: Harry Jones - 133

=== VFA best and fairest winners ===
- J. J. Liston Trophy winners
  - 1950 – Frank Stubbs
  - 1957 – Ken Ross
- J. Field Medal winner
  - 1971 – Rodney Evans

=== Team of the Century ===
- Backline: Colin Judd, Jim Bohan, Ken Ross
- Half back: Geoff Mason, Harry Jones, Marcus Boyall
- Centre: Reg Horkings, Lloyd Holyoak, Charlie Clamp
- Half forward: Ian Whitten, Laurie Nash, Roy Williams.
- Forward: Bill Luff, Garry Hammond, Geoff Simpson
- Followers: Frank Stubbs, Godon Duff, R.J. 'Nipper' Bradford
- Interchange: Brendan Budge, Mark Davidson, Peter Oliver, Peter Stevenson, George Stone, Ross Wright
- Coach: A 'Horrie' Mason
- Captain Jim Bohan
- Vice Captain Colin Judd

=== 100-game players ===
The following footballers played at least 100 senior games for Camberwell in the VFA:

- Greg Spithill: 163
- Gary Hammond: 162
- Ken Freiberg: 151
- Oscar Skalberg: 150
- Harry Jones: 143*
- Jim Bohan: 140
- Phil Neilson: 139
- Colin Judd: 134
- Roy Williams: 133
- Bill Hazlett: 128
- Geoff Mason: 127
- Geoff Simpson: 123
- Kevin Johnson: 116
- Gordon Duff: 114
- Jack Seelenmeyer: 113
- Charlie Clamp: 113
- Reg Fletcher: 113
- Ken Douglas: 112
- Dennis Boyd: 112
- Mark Davidson: 110
- John Hook: 110
- Reg Horkings: 108
- Peter Fox: 106
- Bob Gibson: 106
- Keith McGuinness: 105
- John Smith: 105
- Ern Dyball: 104
- Geoff Brayne: 103
- Ken Benbow: 101

- Harry Jones: Played his first 133 games in a row for Camberwell.

== Seasons ==
Premiers	Grand Finalist	Minor premiers	Finals appearance	Wooden spoon	VFA/VFL leading goalkicker	VFA/VFL best and fairest

=== Seniors ===
Year	League	Division	Finish	W	L	D	Coach	Captain	President	Best and fairest	Leading goalkicker	Goals	Ref
1888	VJFA												
1889	VJFA		6th	13	4	4							
1890	VJFA		8th	14	6	1							
1891	VJFA		8th	9	3	2							
1892	VJFA												
1893	VJFA												
1894	VJFA												
1895	N/A	(In recess)											
1896	N/A	(No formal competition)											
1897	N/A	(No formal competition)											
1898	N/A	(No formal competition)											
1899	ESFA												
1900	ESFA												
1901	ESFA												
1902	ESFA												
1903	ESFA												
1904	ESFA												
1905	RDFA												
1906	RDFA												
1907	RDFA												
1908	RDFA												
1909	RDFA												
1910	RDFA												
1911	RDFA	A Section											
1912	N/A	(In recess)											
1913	VJFA												
1914	VJFA												
1915	N/A	(No formal competition)											
1916	VJFA		8th	3	13	0							
1917	VJFA												
1918	VJFA												
1919	VJFA												
1920	MDFA												
1921	MDFA												
1922	MDFA												
1923	MDFA												
1924	MDFA												
1925	VFLSD		1st										
1926	VFA						George Rawle	George Rawle	H. Rooks	Les Woodford	Les Woodford	49	
1927	VFA						Tom Elliott	Tom Elliott		Reg Page	Les Woodford	40	
1928	VFA						Wally Gunnyon	Wally Gunnyon		Rev. E. Lyall Williams	Les Woodford	36	
1929	VFA						Jim Shanahan; Bert Calwell	Jim Lawn		Jim Lawn	Jim Lawn	44	
1930	VFA						Percy Wilson	Jim Lawn	Frank Hartnett	Bob O’Neill			
1931	VFA						Percy Wilson	Stan Petrie	Frank Hartnett	Harry Jones	Bill Luff	52	
1932	VFA						Horrie Mason	Horrie Mason	Frank Hartnett	Jim Lawn	Bill Luff	81	
1933	VFA						Horrie Mason	Horrie Mason	Frank Hartnett	Ern Dyball	Bill Luff	106	
1934	VFA						Maurie Hunter; Horrie Mason	Maurie Hunter; Horrie Mason	J.H. Gray	Roy Williams			
1935	VFA						Horrie Mason	Horrie Mason		Harry Jones	Bill Luff	75	
1936	VFA						Horrie Mason	Horrie Mason		Reg Henderson	Harry Jones		
1937	VFA						Roy Laing	Roy Williams	G. McCutchan	Joe Meehan			
1938	VFA						Roy Laing	Laurie Nash	Frank Hartnett	Arthur Davidson	Laurie Nash	81	
1939	VFA						Laurie Nash	Laurie Nash	Frank Hartnett	Laurie Nash	Laurie Nash	100	
1940	VFA						Laurie Nash	Laurie Nash	Frank Hartnett	Reg Horkings	Laurie Nash	96	
1941	VFA						Roy Cazaly	Reg Henderson		Harry Whitehead	Laurie Nash	141	
1942	VFA	(No season)						Harry Whitehead					
1943	VFA	(No season)											
1944	VFA	(No season)											
1945	VFA						Albert Collier	Albert Collier		E. Jim Bradford			
1946	VFA						Albert Collier	Albert Collier		E. Jim Bradford	Kollen Bryce	61	
1947	VFA						Marcus Boyall; Harry Collier	Marcus Boyall; Harry Collier		Marcus Boyall	John McDonald	47	
1948	VFA						Roy Williams	Ivor McIvor		Frank Stubbs	Jim Bohan	66	
1949	VFA						Roy Williams	Frank Stubbs		Frank Stubbs	R. Milgate	63	
1950	VFA						Cec Ruddell	Cec Ruddell		Frank Stubbs	R. Milgate	35	
1951	VFA						Frank Stubbs; Jim Bohan	Jim Bohan	C.S. Greenwood	Jim Bohan	R Milgate	69	
1952	VFA						Jim Bohan		C.H. Henderson	Jim Bohan	Ken McFee	41	
1953	VFA						Jim Bohan	Jim Bohan		Jim Bohan	Ken McFee	35	
1954	VFA						Ted Jarrad	Ted Jarrad		Geoff Mason	Ken McFee	33	
1955	VFA						Roy Laing	Kevin Clarke		Lloyd Holyoak	Jack Hedley	27	
1956	VFA						Ken Ross	Ken Ross		Ken Ross	Keith McGuinness	38	
1957	VFA						Ken Ross	Ken Ross		Ken Ross	E Higson	45	
1958	VFA						Ken Ross	Ken Ross		Peter Box	E Higson	33	
1959	VFA						Ken Chambers			Kevin Johnson	Ken Freiberg	38	
1960	VFA						Colin Campbell	Ivan 'Oscar' Skalberg		Ian Whitten	Ron O'Neill	39	
1961	VFA	Division 2					Colin Campbell	Ivan 'Oscar' Skalberg		Ted Bailey	Ron O'Neill	95	
1962	VFA	Division 2					Colin Campbell	Ivan 'Oscar' Skalberg		Ian Whitten	Ron O'Neill	52	
1963	VFA	Division 2					Bert Gaudion	Bert Gaudion		Ken Douglas	G Ellis	22	
1964	VFA	Division 2					Bert Gaudion	Bert Gaudion		Ken Pemberton	Ron O'Neill	77	
1965	VFA	Division 2					Bert Gaudion	Bert Gaudion		Don Mackie	Keith Smith	34	
1966	VFA	Division 2					Des Healy	Ron O'Neill		John Smith	Ron O'Neill	88	
1967	VFA	Division 2					Mike Delanty	Mike Delanty		John Smith	J Wicks	58	
1968	VFA	Division 2					Mike Delanty	Mike Delanty		John Smith	Mike Delanty	35	
1969	VFA	Division 2					Mike Delanty	Mike Delanty		Mick Conyers	G Brayne	35	
1970	VFA	Division 2					Peter Brenchley	Mick Conyers		Dennis Boyd	John Taylor	26	
1971	VFA	Division 2					Peter Brenchley; Mick Conyers	Mick Conyers		Rod Evans	Peter Edwards	29	
1972	VFA	Division 2					Graeme Clarke	Peter De Bonde		George Stone	Gary Hammond	66	
1973	VFA	Division 2					Graeme Clarke	John Hook		Gary Hammond	Gary Hammond	48	
1974	VFA	Division 2					Graeme Clarke	John Hook		Geoff Simpson	Mike Moore	51	
1975	VFA	Division 2					Mike Bowden	Mike Bowden		Geoff Simpson	Gary Hammond	112	
1976	VFA	Division 2					Mike Bowden	Mike Bowden		Roy Kennedy	Gary Hammond	120	
1977	VFA	Division 2					Ray Smith	Ray Smith		John Hook	Gary Hammond	128	
1978	VFA	Division 2					Ray Smith	Ray Smith		Ray Smith	Bruce Smith	74	
1979	VFA	Division 2					Graeme Phillips	Peter Oliver		Colin Judd	Scott Cowley	65	
1980	VFA	Division 1					Graeme Phillips	Colin Judd		Phil Neilson	Ross Wright	23	
1981	VFA	Division 2					Leon Rice	Colin Judd			Peter Stevenson	119	
1982	VFA	Division 1					Leon Rice	Colin Judd		Rob McFee	Peter Stevenson	87	
1983	VFA	Division 1					Phil Fryer	Mark Davidson		Rob Wilkinson	Peter Stevenson	69	
1984	VFA	Division 1					Phil Fryer	Mark Davidson		Drew Pevitt	Peter Stevenson	86	
1985	VFA	Division 1					Colin Judd			Terry De Koning	Brett Weatherald	67	
1986	VFA	Division 1					Greg Spithill	Con Constantinou		Danny Frew	Craig Aylen	39	
1987	VFA	Division 2					Sam Kekovich	Con Constantinou		George Steiner	John Frazer	91	
1988	VFA	Division 2					Sam Kekovich	Rene Kink		Michael Guertz	Damian Condon	46	
1989	VFA	–	14th	0	18	0	Sam Kekovich	Ralph Jones		Brendan Budge	John Modica	26	
1990	VFA	–					Gary Brice			Dean Greig	Darren Wilkinson	26	
1991	VFA	(In recess)											
1992	VAFA	G North	5th	9	6	0	Steven Sherry	W. Glazebrook					
1993	VAFA	F2 Section	10th	3	15	0	Steven Sherry	W. Glazebrook					
1994	VAFA	XVIII North											
1995	VAFA	XVIII North	(In recess)										

=== Grand finals ===
Premiers	Runners-up	Drawn

Year	League	Division	Grade	Opponent	Score	Venue	Crowd	Date	Report
1899	ESFA		Seniors	Albion	2.6 (18) d. 1.2 (8)	Camberwell		16 September 1899	
1907	RDFA		Seniors	Mitcham	2.6 (18) d. 1.2 (8)	Blackburn		31 August 1907	
1908	RDFA		Seniors						
1909	RDFA		Seniors						
1911	RDFA	A Section	Seniors	Burwood	14.14 (99) d. 2.1 (19)				
1921	MDFA		Seniors	Brunswick Juniors	10 point margin				
1922	MDFA		Seniors	Moreland	8.9 (57) d. 7.9 (51)	Dandenong		7 October 1922	
1923	MDFA		Seniors	Fairfield	9.12 (66) d. 8.8 (56)	Melbourne Cricket Ground	"Large"	29 September 1923	
1935	VFA		Seniors	Yarraville	10.10 (70) d. 8.13 (61)	Toorak Park	14,600	7 September 1935	
1946	VFA		Seniors	Sandringham	14.15 (99) d. 13.14 (92)	St Kilda Cricket Ground	30,000	5 October 1946	
1963	VFA	Division 2	Reserves	Sunshine	7.11 (53) d. 5.9 (39)	Box Hill City Oval		7 September 1963	
1975	VFA	Division 2	Seniors	Brunswick	18.22 (130) d. 12.11 (83)	Toorak Park	9,000	7 September 1975	
1978	VFA	Division 2	Seniors	Frankston	15.13 (103) d. 13.11 (89)	Toorak Park	8,000	10 September 1978	
1979	VFA	Division 2	Seniors	Oakleigh	18.13 (121) d. 12.11 (83)	Toorak Park	12,023	9 September 1979	
1981	VFA	Division 2	Seniors	Waverley	15.16 (106) d. 11.8 (74)	Toorak Park	8,250	6 September 1981	
1981	VFA	Division 2	Reserves	Oakleigh	18.12 (120) d. 17.14 (116)	Toorak Park		29 September 1923	

== VFL players ==
The following footballers played with Camberwell prior to making their VFL (now AFL) debut:

- 1911 – Ben Main: South Melbourne
- 1915 – Bill Amery: Richmond
- 1919 – Harry Weatherill: Richmond
- 1922 – Doug Hayes: Richmond
- 1925 – Gil Hendrie: Hawthorn
- 1925 – Reg Whitehead: Hawthorn
- 1925 – Les Woodford: Hawthorn
- 1926 – Alby Millard: Hawthorn
- 1928 – Wally Lathlain: Hawthorn
- 1928 – Keith Parris: Essendon
- 1929 - Richard Greenwood: Footscray
- 1930 - Leon Bazin: Footscray
- 1930 – George Bennett: Hawthorn
- 1930 – Roy Williams: Footscray
- 1932 – Les Harvey: Collingwood
- 1934 – Alec Fyfe: Collingwood
- 1934 – Bill Luff: Essendon
- 1934 – Len Wallace: Essendon
- 1935 – Clarrie Shields: Footscray
- 1935 – Vin Smith: Hawthorn
- 1935 – Ray Wartman: Melbourne
- 1937 – Tommy Laskey: Fitzroy
- 1939 – Arthur Davidson: Hawthorn
- 1940 – Jack Bennett: Carlton
- 1940 – Jack Kenny: North Melbourne
- 1941 – George Lenne: Melbourne
- 1941 – Albert Prior: Hawthorn
- 1942 – Frank Anderson: North Melbourne
- 1942 – Bob Austen: Hawthorn
- 1942 – Barney Jorgensen: Hawthorn
- 1943 – Don Wilks: Hawthorn
- 1944 – Tom Spear: Hawthorn
- 1946 – Ken Munro: Hawthorn
- 1946 - Alan McDonald: Richmond
- 1946 – Billy Winward: St. Kilda
- 1951 – Jack MacDonald: Hawthorn
- 1959 – Brian Coleman: Hawthorn
- 1959 – Peter Rice: South Melbourne
- 1978 – Terry Wallace: Hawthorn
- 1990 – Dean Greig: St. Kilda
- 1991 – Darron Wilkinson: Fitzroy

=== VFL players who joined Camberwell ===
The following footballers came to play and/or coach with Camberwell after senior experience at a VFL (now AFL) club:

- 1909 – Reuben Holland: South Melbourne
- 1919 – Jim Cowell: St. Kilda
- 1921 – Clarrie Calwell: Carlton
- 1921 – Reg Hede: Richmond
- 1922 – Reg Whitehead: Richmond
- 1923? – George Robbins: St. Kilda
- 1926 – Dave Elliman: Melbourne
- 1926 – Lew Gough: Hawthorn
- 1926 - Harry Harrison: Essendon
- 1926 – George Rawle: Essendon
- 1926 – W. H. Billy Stone Carlton
- 1926 – Jack Vale: Carlton
- 1927 – Jack Boothman: Hawthorn
- 1927 – Carl Watson: Richmond
- 1927 – Bert Calwell: Hawthorn
- 1928 – Harry Brown: St. Kilda
- 1928 – Wally Gunnyon: St. Kilda
- 1928 – Harry Lakin: St. Kilda
- 1929 – Ted Brewis: Carlton
- 1929 – Jim Shanahan: Collingwood
- 1930 - George Bayliss: Richmond
- 1930 – Ron Black: Hawthorn
- 1930 – Frank Whitty: Hawthorn
- 1930? - Eric Poole: South Melbourne
- 1930 - Percy Wilson: Collingwood
- 1932?- Alex Clarke: North Melbourne
- 1932 – Horrie Mason: St. Kilda
- 1934 – Maurie Hunter: Richmond
- 1934 - Clive McCorkell: Essendon
- 1934 - Joe Meehan: South Melbourne
- 1934 – Dick O'Shea: North Melbourne
- 1934 - Charlie Stanbridge - South Melbourne
- 1934 - Johnny Walker: Essendon
- 1934 - Carl Watson: Richmond
- 1934 – Albert "Jack" Williamson: Carlton
- 1936 – Jack Kidd: Essendon
- 1936 - Roy Selleck: South Melbourne
- 1936 – Clete Turner: Geelong
- 1937 – Roy Laing: Essendon
- 1938 – Terry Brain: South Melbourne
- 1938 – Frank Finn: Carlton
- 1938 – Laurie Nash: South Melbourne
- 1939 – Dick Abikhair: Hawthorn
- 1939 – Monty Brown: Carlton
- 1939 – Pat Farrelly: Carlton
- 1939 – Alan Fitcher: Fitzroy
- 1939 – Viv Randall: Hawthorn
- 1939 – Ted Pool: Hawthorn
- 1939 – Joe Rogers: North Melbourne
- 1939 – Jim Toohey Junior: Fitzroy
- 1940 – Bernie O'Brien: Footscray
- 1941 – Roy Cazaly: St. Kilda
- 1941 – Stan Spinks: Hawthorn
- 1941 – Laurie Taylor: South Melbourne
- 1945 – Jim Bradford: Collingwood
- 1945 – Albert Collier: Collingwood
- 1945 - Ken Dineen: South Melbourne
- 1945 – Allan Jensen: Hawthorn
- 1945 - Alan McDonald - Richmond
- 1946 - Alf Benison: South Melbourne
- 1946 - Dal Kennedy: Footscray
- 1946 – Ivor McIvor: Essendon
- 1947 - Frank Stubbs: North Melbourne
- 1947 – Marcus Boyall: Collingwood
- 1947 – Jim Bohan: Hawthorn
- 1948 – Ken Ross – Fitzroy
- 1949 - Bob Milgate - Hawthorn
- 1950 – Cec Ruddell: Essendon
- 1951 – Jack Headley: North Melbourne
- 1952 - Bob Bradley: Essendon
- 1952 – Alan Thynne: Carlton
- 1953 – Dick Harris: Richmond
- 1953 - Keith McGuinness: South Melbourne
- 1953 – Oscar Skalberg: North Melbourne
- 1954 – Ted Jarrard: North Melbourne
- 1955 – Ken McKaige: Melbourne
- 1955 – Vin Sabbatucci: St. Kilda
- 1958 – Peter Box: Footscray
- 1959 – Terry Mountain: Geelong
- 1967 – Mike Delanty: Collingwood
- 1967 – Bill Serong: Collingwood
- 1970 – Peter Brenchley: Melbourne
- 1974 – Colin Judd: Hawthorn
- 1977 – Neil Chamberlain: Melbourne
- 1977 – Ray Smith: Essendon
- 1978 – Ross Wright: Essendon
- 1979 – Kerry Haywood: North Melbourne
- 1980 – Rino Pretto: Fitzroy
- 1980 – Leon Rice: Hawthorn
- 1982 – Mordy Bromberg: St. Kilda
- 1982 – Robert Wilkinson: Hawthorn
- 1984 – Graeme Schultz: Essendon
- 1984 – Mark Turner: Hawthorn
- 1987 – John Frazer: North Melbourne
- 1987 – Sam Kekovich: North Melbourne
- 1988 – Rene Kink: Collingwood
- 1989 – David Sullivan: Essendon
- 1990 – Gary Brice: South Melbourne
