= 1935 VFA season =

57th season of the Victorian Football Association

1935 VFA premiership season
- Teams: 12
- Premiers: Yarraville; 1st premiership
- Minor premiers: Northcote; 5th minor premiership

The 1935 VFA season was the 57th season of the Victorian Football Association (VFA), an Australian rules football competition played in the state of Victoria. The premiership was won by the Yarraville Football Club, after it defeated Camberwell by nine points in the Grand Final on 7 September. It was the club's first VFA premiership, won in its eighth season of competition.

== Finals venue ==
After having played finals at the central Olympic Park for the previous two seasons, the Association returned to the practice of playing finals at suburban Association grounds. Toorak Park, which had never previously hosted a final, was used for both a semi-final and the Grand Final.

== Premiership ==
The home-and-home season was played over eighteen matches, before the top four clubs contested a finals series under the Page–McIntyre system to determine the premiers for the season.

=== Ladder ===
1935 VFA ladder
Pos	Team	Pld	W	L	D	PF	PA	PP	Pts
1	Northcote	18	16	2	0	1854	1274	145.5	64
2	Yarraville (P)	18	12	6	0	1817	1302	139.6	48
3	Camberwell	18	12	6	0	1720	1271	135.3	48
4	Coburg	18	11	6	1	1634	1457	112.1	46
5	Prahran	18	11	7	0	1567	1139	137.6	44
6	Preston	18	10	7	1	1457	1457	100.0	42
7	Oakleigh	18	9	8	1	1606	1710	93.9	38
8	Brunswick	18	9	9	0	1366	1293	105.6	36
9	Port Melbourne	18	7	10	1	1383	1564	88.4	30
10	Brighton	18	3	15	0	1454	1869	77.8	12
11	Sandringham	18	3	15	0	1268	1947	65.1	12
12	Williamstown	18	3	15	0	1184	2023	58.5	12

Rules for classification: 1) points; 2) percentage; 3) number of points for.
(P) Premiers

=== Finals ===
	Semifinals
Saturday, 17 August	Camberwell 20.13 (133)	def.	Coburg 11.10 (76)	Toorak Park (crowd: 8,000)
Saturday, 24 August	Northcote 13.9 (87)	def. by	Yarraville 15.14 (104)	Coburg Cricket Ground (crowd: 5,000)

	Preliminary Final
Saturday, 31 August	Northcote 10.10 (70)	def. by	Camberwell 9.18 (72)	Brunswick Cricket Ground (crowd: 6,500)

1935 VFA Grand Final
Saturday, 7 September	Yarraville	def.	Camberwell	Toorak Park (crowd: 14,600)
0.0 (0); 4.4 (28); 6.6 (42); 10.10 (70)	Q1; Q2; Q3; Final	2.5 (17); 2.8 (20); 7.12 (54); 8.13 (61)
Buckley 3, McGrath 3, Cashman 2, Cave, Kenny	Goals	Luff 2, Mason 2, Williams 2, Meehan, Tatham
Injuries	Clamp (concussion)
R. Smith, for elbowing Mason	Reports	Tatham, for striking Storey; Meehan, for charging Kenny

== Awards ==
- Bill Luff (Camberwell) was the leading goalkicker for the season; he kicked 64 goals in the home-and-home season and 75 goals overall.
- In the two parallel Association best-and-fairest awards:
  - Les White (Prahran) won the Recorder Cup, polling six votes from only thirteen games, having missed five games due to injury. Allan Hopkins (Yarraville), L. Wedgwood (Yarraville), Len Pye (Northcote) and M. McFarlane (Coburg) finished equal-second with four votes apiece.
  - Jim Dowling (Brunswick) and F. Brooks (Williamstown) were joint winners of the Association Medal, each polling 32 votes; it was Dowling's second consecutive Association Medal. Len Pye (Northcote) was third with 31 votes.
- Coburg won the seconds premiership. Coburg 6.11 (47) defeated Port Melbourne 3.9 (27) in the Grand Final on Saturday 7 September at the Brunswick Cricket Ground.

== Notable events ==
- Northcote, which lost both of its finals, was the first minor premier to fail to win the major premiership since Footscray in 1922.
- A Grand Final rematch was played as a night exhibition match at Olympic Park on Thursday 26 September (Show Day holiday). Yarraville 8.18 (66) defeated Camberwell 5.17 (47). The attendance of 3,000 was considered a disappointment. The floodlights were considered too dim to be entirely effective for the players or spectators.

== See also ==
- List of VFA/VFL Premiers
