= Benison =

Benison is a surname. Notable people with the surname include:

- Alf Benison (1918–1979), Australian rules footballer
- Arthur Benison Hubback (1871–1948), English architect and soldier
- John Benison (born 1946), Australian rules footballer

== See also ==
- Benson (surname)
