= 1946 VFA season =

1946 VFA premiership season
- Teams: 12
- Premiers: Sandringham; 1st premiership
- Minor premiers: Camberwell; 1st minor premiership

The 1946 Victorian Football Association season was the 65th season of the Australian rules football competition. The premiership was won by the Sandringham Football Club, which defeated Camberwell by seven points in the Grand Final on 5 October. It was the first premiership in the club's history.

== Premiership ==
The home-and-home season was played over twenty matches, before the top four clubs contested a finals series under the Page–McIntyre system to determine the premiers for the season.

=== Ladder ===
1946 VFA ladder
| Pos | Team | Pld | W | L | D | PF | PA | PP | Pts |
|---|---|---|---|---|---|---|---|---|---|
| 1 | Camberwell | 20 | 15 | 4 | 1 | 2239 | 1790 | 125.1 | 62 |
| 2 | Williamstown | 20 | 14 | 5 | 1 | 2205 | 1866 | 118.2 | 58 |
| 3 | Sandringham (P) | 20 | 14 | 6 | 0 | 2088 | 1959 | 106.6 | 56 |
| 4 | Port Melbourne | 20 | 14 | 6 | 0 | 2120 | 2020 | 105.0 | 56 |
| 5 | Coburg | 20 | 13 | 7 | 0 | 1912 | 1679 | 113.9 | 52 |
| 6 | Brighton | 20 | 11 | 8 | 1 | 2163 | 2010 | 107.6 | 46 |
| 7 | Brunswick | 20 | 8 | 12 | 0 | 1835 | 1858 | 98.8 | 32 |
| 8 | Yarraville | 20 | 8 | 12 | 0 | 2201 | 2367 | 93.0 | 32 |
| 9 | Oakleigh | 20 | 6 | 14 | 0 | 1895 | 2233 | 84.9 | 24 |
| 10 | Northcote | 20 | 5 | 14 | 1 | 1742 | 2048 | 85.1 | 22 |
| 11 | Preston | 20 | 5 | 15 | 0 | 1777 | 2032 | 87.5 | 20 |
| 12 | Prahran | 20 | 5 | 15 | 0 | 1960 | 2295 | 85.4 | 20 |

Rules for classification: 1) points; 2) percentage; 3) number of points for.
(P) Premiers

=== Finals ===
| | Semifinals |
| Saturday, 14 September | Sandringham 18.14 (122) | def. | Port Melbourne 14.9 (93) | St Kilda Cricket Ground (crowd: 18,000) |
| Saturday, 21 September | Camberwell 12.19 (91) | def. | Williamstown 11.14 (80) | St Kilda Cricket Ground (crowd: 16,000) |

| | Preliminary Final |
| Saturday, 28 September | Williamstown 16.18 (114) | def. by | Sandringham 16.19 (115) | St Kilda Cricket Ground (crowd: 16,000) |

1946 VFA Grand Final
Saturday, 5 October | Camberwell | def. by | Sandringham | St Kilda Cricket Ground (crowd: 30,000)
6.7 (43); 6.9 (45); 11.12 (78); 13.14 (92) | Q1; Q2; Q3; Final | 2.2 (14); 9.7 (61); 11.10 (76); 14.15 (99)
Bond 3, Herbert 2, Oliver 2, Shields 2, Boyall, Bradford, Bristowe, Collier | Goals | Brokenshire 4, Lowry 4, Bencraft 2, Parker 2, Holmes, Pole

== Awards ==
- The J. J. Liston Trophy was won by Bill Findlay (Port Melbourne), who polled 47 votes. Herbie Matthews (Camberwell) was second with 33 votes, and S. Snell (Preston) was third with 31 votes.
- Prahran won the seconds premiership, after defeating Yarraville in the Grand Final.

== Notable events ==
=== Disputed match between Northcote and Sandringham ===
On 25 May, Sandringham 15.13 (103) defeated Northcote 13.10 (88). Northcote protested the result, on the basis that the third quarter was played 10 minutes short of the full duration. The Association resolved that the game should be replayed, but only if it had any bearing on the final four.

After the home-and-home season, Sandringham finished third, four points ahead of fifth-placed Coburg but with a poorer percentage; this meant that the replay was required, and that Coburg would make the finals if it were lost by Sandringham. However, on the Monday after the home-and-home matches were complete, the Association Board of Management decided to rescind its previous decision and allow Sandringham's original win to stand. Coburg was unhappy, and believed it was in a strong legal position to compel the Association to uphold its original decision to replay the match; but, it nevertheless decided not to proceed with any action and allowed the result to stand. As a result, Sandringham qualified for the finals for the first time, and went on to win the premiership.

=== Other notable events ===
- A lightning premiership was held at the St Kilda Cricket Ground on 29 June amongst all twelve teams. Williamstown won the competition, defeating Prahran in the final by the score of 4.3 (27) d. 1.2 (8).
- On 2 September, the VFA was registered as an incorporated company.
- In the preliminary final, Sandringham 9.12 (66) trailed Williamstown 15.16 (106) at three-quarter time, before kicking seven goals to one in the final quarter to win by one point, 16.19 (115) d. 16.18 (114).
- Coburg and Prahran visited Broken Hill on the weekend of 19 October and played two exhibition matches. On Saturday 19 October, Prahran 14.13 (97) defeated Coburg 7.13 (55) under Association rules; on Sunday 20 October, a combined Prahran-Coburg team 8.11 (59) lost to the Zinc Corporation XVIII 11.6 (72) under League rules.
- On Saturday 19 October, Williamstown and Camberwell played an exhibition match under Association rules at the NTCA Ground in Launceston, Tasmania, where the League rules were prevalent. Williamstown 16.11 (107) defeated Camberwell 13.16 (94) in front of a large crowd of 3,600.

== See also ==
- List of VFA/VFL Premiers
