= Alby Millard =

Australian rules footballer (1906–1983)

Personal information
- Full name: Albert Ernest James Millard
- Born: 14 June 1906; Hawthorn, Victoria
- Died: 5 January 1983 (aged 76); Ferntree Gully, Victoria
- Original team: Camberwell
- Height: 170 cm (5 ft 7 in)

Playing career^{1}
Years	Club	Games (Goals)
1926	Hawthorn	1 (0)
- ^{1} Playing statistics correct to the end of 1926.

Albert Ernest James Millard (14 June 1906 – 5 January 1983) was an Australian rules footballer who played with Hawthorn in the Victorian Football League (VFL).

== Early life ==
The son of Vivian Harry Millard (1883–1962) and Evelyn Millard, née Reynolds (1881–1948), Alby Millard was born in Hawthorn on 14 June 1906.

== Football ==
Millard joined Hawthorn at the start of the 1926 VFL season having commenced his career with Camberwell in the Melbourne Districts League. He had the misfortune to injure a knee ligament in the final pre-season practice match but returned via the reserves and played on the wing in the final game of the season against Melbourne. Although frequently named in the better players in the reserves in 1927, he never played another senior game.

== Later life ==
Alby Millard worked as a clicker both during and after his football career. He married Lily Isabel Revitt in 1942 and they lived in the outer eastern suburbs of Melbourne until his death in January 1983. He was cremated at Springvale Botanical Cemetery.
