= Jim Cowell =

Jim Cowell may refer to:

- Jim Cowell (ice hockey) (born 1953), Canadian ice hockey player
- Jim Cowell (Australian footballer) (1885–1956), Australian rules footballer
- Jim Cowell (Scottish footballer) (born 1961), Scottish footballer
