= Pat Farrelly =

Pat Farrelly may refer to:

- Pat Farrelly (Australian footballer) (1913–2007), Australian rules footballer
- Pat Farrelly (racewalker) (1935–2018), Canadian Olympic racewalker
