= 1952 VFA season =

1952 VFA premiership season
- Teams: 14
- Premiers: Oakleigh; 4th premiership
- Minor premiers: Port Melbourne; 4th minor premiership

The 1952 Victorian Football Association season was the 71st season of the Australian rules football competition. The premiership was won by the Oakleigh Football Club, after it defeated Port Melbourne by 21 points in the Grand Final on 4 October. It was Oakleigh's fourth VFA premiership.

== Premiership ==
The home-and-home season was played over twenty matches, before the top four clubs contested a finals series under the Page–McIntyre system to determine the premiers for the season.

=== Ladder ===
1952 VFA ladder
| Pos | Team | Pld | W | L | D | PF | PA | PP | Pts |
|---|---|---|---|---|---|---|---|---|---|
| 1 | Port Melbourne | 20 | 18 | 2 | 0 | 1911 | 1245 | 153.5 | 72 |
| 2 | Coburg | 20 | 15 | 5 | 0 | 1709 | 1272 | 134.4 | 60 |
| 3 | Oakleigh (P) | 20 | 13 | 7 | 0 | 1494 | 1226 | 121.9 | 52 |
| 4 | Yarraville | 20 | 13 | 7 | 0 | 1537 | 1434 | 107.2 | 52 |
| 5 | Brunswick | 20 | 12 | 8 | 0 | 1366 | 1278 | 106.9 | 48 |
| 6 | Camberwell | 20 | 11 | 8 | 1 | 1411 | 1363 | 103.5 | 46 |
| 7 | Prahran | 20 | 11 | 9 | 0 | 1511 | 1501 | 100.7 | 44 |
| 8 | Moorabbin | 20 | 10 | 10 | 0 | 1301 | 1326 | 98.1 | 40 |
| 9 | Northcote | 20 | 10 | 10 | 0 | 1270 | 1321 | 96.1 | 40 |
| 10 | Williamstown | 20 | 8 | 12 | 0 | 1767 | 1571 | 112.5 | 32 |
| 11 | Preston | 20 | 7 | 12 | 1 | 1495 | 1576 | 94.9 | 30 |
| 12 | Sandringham | 20 | 7 | 13 | 0 | 1393 | 1743 | 79.9 | 28 |
| 13 | Box Hill | 20 | 2 | 18 | 0 | 1228 | 1856 | 66.2 | 8 |
| 14 | Brighton | 20 | 2 | 18 | 0 | 1036 | 1717 | 60.3 | 8 |

Rules for classification: 1) points; 2) percentage; 3) number of points for.
(P) Premiers

=== Finals ===
| | Semifinals |
| Saturday, 13 September | Oakleigh 14.19 (103) | def. | Yarraville 13.15 (93) | St Kilda Cricket Ground (crowd: 16,000) |
| Saturday, 20 September | Port Melbourne 11.8 (74) | def. | Coburg 5.11 (41) | St Kilda Cricket Ground (crowd: 16,000) |

| | Preliminary Final |
| Saturday, 27 September | Coburg 8.10 (58) | def. by | Oakleigh 11.13 (79) | St Kilda Cricket Ground (crowd: 17,000) |

1952 VFA Grand Final
Saturday, 4 October | Port Melbourne | def. by | Oakleigh | St Kilda Cricket Ground (crowd: 39,500)
1.4 (10); 2.7 (19); 5.12 (42); 8.15 (63) | Q1; Q2; Q3; Final | 2.5 (17); 5.9 (39); 9.12 (66); 11.18 (84) | Umpires: Merrington
Bonnett 3, Caris 2, Bower, Houlihan, Murray | Goals | Scott 5, Wenn 3, Lambert, Newton, Watson
Murray (ribs), Tucker (knee) | Injuries | Cunningham ( knee), Savory (cramp)
Johnson, for kicking Lambert in the second quarter Murray, for unseemly conduct (interfering with the umpire) in the second quarter | Reports

== Awards ==
- The leading goalkicker for the season was Johnny Walker (Williamstown), who kicked 103 goals in the home-and-home season and did not participate in finals.
- The J. J. Liston Trophy was won by Frank Johnson (Port Melbourne), who polled 47 votes. Jim Bohan (Camberwell) was second with 45 votes, and Bill Morris (Box Hill) was third with 23 votes.
- Yarraville won the seconds premiership. Yarraville 14.13 (97) defeated Moorabbin 12.15 (87) in the Grand Final, played as a curtain raiser to the firsts Grand Final on 4 October.

== Notable events ==
- The Association's Thirds competition, contested by players under the age of 19, was established in 1952. Most clubs already operated Thirds teams, but they were fielded in local leagues rather than a dedicated Association-operated competition.
- In its first match of the season on 19 April, Oakleigh 14.10 (94) comfortably defeated Brunswick 4.9 (33). However, two of Oakleigh's new recruits – Eric Guy and Bill Botten, both from the Carrum Football Club – were played before their clearances from the Mornington Peninsula Football League were formally lodged with the Association; as a result, on 5 May the Association awarded the match and the four premiership points to Brunswick, and Oakleigh was fined £10. Oakleigh argued that the paperwork error was made by the Permit Committee, not the club; but the Association found that the onus was on Oakleigh to ensure the paperwork was lodged correctly. In August, the club took the Association to the Supreme Court of Victoria, seeking to overturn the penalties and injunct the Association from staging the finals if the penalty affected Oakleigh's finishing position, but dropped the case prior to the final round of home-and-home matches after the injunction was refused and an unfavourable reserved judgement was delivered. Ultimately, the club's third placing on the ladder was unaffected by the penalty, and it went on to win the premiership. The legal action cost the club an estimated £453.
- On 3 May, Box Hill won its first senior match in the Association, defeating Brighton 12.14 (86) d. 12.12 (84), to end a 22-game winless streak which included one draw.

== See also ==
- List of VFA/VFL Premiers
