= Richard Greenwood =

Richard Greenwood may refer to:

- Dick Greenwood (born 1940), former England rugby union international
- Richard A. Greenwood, Utah politician
- Richard Greenwood (Australian footballer) (1905–1987), Australian rules footballer
