= 1956 VFA season =

1956 VFA premiership season
- Teams: 14
- Premiers: Williamstown; 8th premiership
- Minor premiers: Williamstown; 5th minor premiership

The 1956 Victorian Football Association season was the 75th season of the Australian rules football competition. The premiership was won by the Williamstown Football Club, after it defeated Port Melbourne in the Grand Final on 29 September by twenty-four points. It was Williamstown's eighth premiership, its third in a row (all won against Port Melbourne), and the third of five premierships won in six seasons from 1954 until 1959.

== Premiership ==
The home-and-home season was played over twenty matches, before the top four clubs contested a finals series under the Page–McIntyre system to determine the premiers for the season.

=== Ladder ===
1956 VFA ladder
Pos	Team	Pld	W	L	D	PF	PA	PP	Pts
1	Williamstown (P)	20	17	3	0	1725	1070	161.2	68
2	Port Melbourne	20	16	4	0	1849	1187	155.8	64
3	Brunswick	20	14	6	0	1637	1260	129.9	56
4	Box Hill	20	14	6	0	1359	1075	126.4	56
5	Preston	20	14	6	0	1542	1247	123.7	56
6	Moorabbin	20	12	8	0	1553	1242	125.0	48
7	Sandringham	20	9	11	0	1283	1434	89.5	36
8	Yarraville	20	9	11	0	1280	1470	87.1	36
9	Coburg	20	7	12	1	1655	1647	100.5	30
10	Oakleigh	20	7	12	1	1091	1529	71.4	30
11	Brighton	20	6	13	1	1343	1743	77.1	26
12	Camberwell	20	5	15	0	1199	1687	71.1	20
13	Prahran	20	4	15	1	1164	1783	65.3	18
14	Northcote	20	4	16	0	1065	1371	77.7	16

Rules for classification: 1) points; 2) percentage; 3) number of points for.
(P) Premiers

=== Finals ===
	Semifinals
Saturday, 8 September	Brunswick 12.18 (90)	def. by	Box Hill 15.15 (105)	St Kilda Cricket Ground (crowd: 10,900)
Saturday, 15 September	Williamstown 10.13 (73)	def. by	Port Melbourne 12.15 (87)	St Kilda Cricket Ground (crowd: 20,000)

	Preliminary Final
Saturday, 22 September	Williamstown 12.14 (86)	def.	Box Hill 8.16 (64)	St Kilda Cricket Ground (crowd: 16,000)

1956 VFA Grand Final
Saturday, 29 September	Port Melbourne	def. by	Williamstown	St Kilda Cricket Ground (crowd: 28,000)
5.6 (36); 8.11 (59); 9.14 (68); 10.18 (78)	Q1; Q2; Q3; Final	3.1 (19); 8.5 (53); 8.10 (58); 14.18 (102)	Umpires: Jack Irving
Bonnett 4, Collins, Harvey, Johnson, McDonald, Miller, Sykes	Goals	McPherson 6, Gear 2, Callahan, Fisher, Linton, Reed, Smith, Wookey
Atkinson (ankle), Laffey (leg)	Injuries	Curran (hand)
Port Melbourne and Williamstown were tied on 10.16 (76) with ten minutes remaining, before Williamstown kicked four late goals.

== Awards ==
- The leading goalkicker for the home-and-home season was Bob Bonnett (Port Melbourne), who kicked 88 goals.
- The J. J. Liston Trophy was won by Jack Martin (Williamstown), who polled 41 votes. Ken Ross (Camberwell) was second with 28 votes, and Frank Johnson (Port Melbourne) was third with 25 votes.
- Williamstown won the seconds premiership. Williamstown 14.16 (100) defeated Box Hill 4.7 (31) in the Grand Final, played as a curtain raiser to the firsts Grand Final on 29 September.

== Notable events ==
=== Perth Carnival ===
The Association competed in the 1956 Perth Carnival, and finished in last place with a record of 0–4. Port Melbourne's Frank Johnson captained the Association team, and Northcote's Bill Faul served as coach. Johnson was named as captain of the All-Australian team; no other Association players were named in the team.

	1956 Perth Carnival
Thursday, 14 June	South Australia 16.14 (110)	def.	Victoria (VFA) 11.10 (76)	Subiaco Oval
Saturday, 16 June	Victoria (VFL) 21.17 (143)	def.	Victoria (VFA) 3.5 (23)	Subiaco Oval
Tuesday, 19 June	Tasmania 27.22 (184)	def.	Victoria (VFA) 12.12 (84)	Subiaco Oval
Thursday, 21 June	Western Australia 22.20 (152)	def.	Victoria (VFA) 9.15 (69)	Subiaco Oval

=== Other notable events ===
- The Preston City Oval was unavailable during 1956 after being upgraded and resurfaced by the council in October 1955. Preston played its home matches at Coburg for the season.
- Northcote players were paid for their services during 1956, after having played as amateurs since mid-1953 due to the club's financial difficulties. During the season, Yarraville suffered financial difficulties, and players' match payments were reduced from four pounds to ten shillings.
- In its Round 1 match, Coburg 6.5 (41) trailed Preston 13.8 (86) by 45 points at three-quarter time, before kicking 8.10 to no score in the final quarter to win 14.15 (99) d. 13.8 (86).
- In its Round 7 match, Yarraville defeated Williamstown by one point after Jack Whallis kicked a goal after the final siren from 35 yards.

== See also ==
- List of VFA/VFL premiers
