= 1950 VFA season =

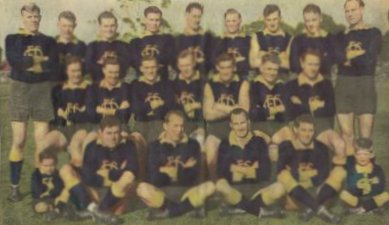

Overview
- Date: 22 April – 30 September 1950
- Teams: 12
- Premiers: Oakleigh; 3rd premiership
- Runners-up: Port Melbourne; 7th runners-up result
- Minor premiers: Oakleigh; 3rd minor premiership
- J. J. Liston Trophy: Frank Stubbs (Camberwell – 38 votes)
- Leading goalkicker: Johnny Walker (Williamstown – 71 goals)

Attendance
- Matches played: 118
- Total attendance: 456,850
- Highest (finals): 38,000 (Grand Final, Oakleigh vs Port Melbourne)

The 1950 VFA season was the 69th season of the Victorian Football Association (VFA).

Oakleigh won the premiership for the third time, defeating Port Melbourne in the 1950 VFA Grand Final.

== Australian National Football Council affiliation ==
During the 1949 season, the Association had made the decision to re-affiliate with the Australian National Football Council. This meant that from 1950, the Association played under the national standard code of rules. Most notably, this meant that throwing the ball in general play was no longer legal. Other rules, including the free kick for 'kicking in danger' which had been introduced under Association rules in 1947, also had to be dropped.

== Home-and-away season ==
The home-and-home season was played over nineteen matches, before the top four clubs contested a finals series under the Page–McIntyre system to determine the premiers for the season.

== Ladder ==
Pos	Team	Pld	W	L	D	PF	PA	PP	Pts
1	Oakleigh (P)	19	15	4	0	1601	1304	122.8	60
2	Port Melbourne	19	14	5	0	1600	1285	124.5	56
3	Williamstown	19	13	6	0	1486	1411	105.3	52
4	Brighton	19	12	6	1	1853	1330	139.3	50
5	Coburg	19	12	7	0	1709	1461	117.0	48
6	Prahran	19	10	9	0	1621	1446	112.1	40
7	Sandringham	19	10	9	0	1644	1570	104.7	40
8	Brunswick	18	9	8	1	1353	1366	99.0	38
9	Camberwell	18	8	10	0	1326	1368	96.9	32
10	Northcote	19	4	15	0	1233	1865	66.1	16
11	Preston	19	3	16	0	1242	1723	72.1	12
12	Yarraville	19	2	17	0	1446	1985	72.8	8

Rules for classification: 1) points; 2) percentage; 3) number of points for.
(P) Premiers

== Finals ==
=== Semi-finals ===
	Semi-finals
Saturday, 9 September	Williamstown 9.10 (64)	def. by	Brighton 15.12 (102)	St Kilda Cricket Ground (crowd: 18,000)
Saturday, 16 September	Oakleigh 12.15 (87)	def.	Port Melbourne 11.10 (76)	St Kilda Cricket Ground (crowd: 23,000)

=== Preliminary final ===
	Preliminary final
Saturday, 23 September	Port Melbourne 11.6 (72)	def.	Brighton 8.12 (60)	St Kilda Cricket Ground (crowd: 19,000)

=== Grand Final ===
1950 VFA Grand Final
Saturday, 30 September	Oakleigh	def.	Port Melbourne	St Kilda Cricket Ground (crowd: 38,000)
5.5 (35); 6.8 (44); 13.9 (87); 13.9 (87)	Q1; Q2; Q3; Final	2.0 (12); 6.8 (44); 7.11 (53); 9.14 (68)	Umpires: Jack Cleary
Edwards 3, Hill 3, Lambert 2, Cunningham, Deayton, Howell, C. Watson, J. Watson	Goals	Lewis 4, Woodbridge 2, Atkinson, Culph, Walsh

== Awards ==
- The leading goalkicker for the home-and-home season was Bruce Harper (Sandringham), who kicked 70 goals; the leading goalkicker overall was Johnny Walker (Williamstown), who kicked 66 goals in the home-and-home season and 71 goals overall.
- The J. J. Liston Trophy was won by Frank Stubbs (Camberwell), who polled 38 votes. Jack Spencer (Brunswick) was second with 28 votes, and Roy Harper (Sandringham) was third with 26½ votes.
- Coburg won the seconds premiership. Coburg 8.11 (59) defeated Williamstown 7.11 (53) in the Grand Final, played as a curtain raiser to the firsts Grand Final on 30 September.

== Notable events ==
=== Brisbane Carnival ===
As a consequence of joining the ANFC, the Association was permitted to send a representative team to the 1950 Brisbane Carnival. The team was coached by Bill Faul (Prahran) and captained by Jack Whelan (Brunswick). The Association competed in the top division, and finished in last place with a record of 1–3; this meant that the Association was required to play off against the winner of the lower division, the Australian Amateurs, during 1951 to determine which team qualified for the top division at the next carnival.

	1950 Brisbane Carnival
Wednesday, 19 July	Tasmania 14.7 (91)	def.	Victoria (VFA) 9.15 (69)	Brisbane Exhibition Ground (crowd: 5,200)
Monday, 24 July	Victoria (VFA) 6.6 (42)	def.	South Australia 4.10 (34)	Brisbane Exhibition Ground
Wednesday, 26 July	Victoria (VFL) 18.13 (121)	def.	Victoria (VFA) 6.5 (41)	Brisbane Exhibition Ground
Saturday, 29 July	Western Australia 15.20 (110)	def.	Victoria (VFA) 6.6 (42)	Brisbane Exhibition Ground

=== Other notable events ===
- The match between Brunswick and Camberwell on 19 August ended in controversy. The final bell was rung with Camberwell leading by a point, and Camberwell fans ran onto the ground to celebrate; but, umpire Irvine had not heard the bell and allowed play to continue; fifteen seconds later, Brunswick's Ivor McIvor scored a goal, and Brunswick 10.14 (74) defeated Camberwell 9.15 (69). Camberwell protested the result, and the Association declared the match 'no result'. No replay was held, as it was late in the season and the match could not affect the final four; as such, both teams are credited with eighteen games instead of nineteen for the year.
