= Ivor McIvor =

Australian rules footballer (1917–1997)

Personal information
- Full name: Ivor Thomas McIvor
- Born: 16 September 1917; Fitzroy North, Victoria
- Died: 3 April 1997 (aged 79)
- Original team: Don Rovers
- Height: 187 cm (6 ft 2 in)
- Weight: 94 kg (207 lb)
- Position: Key position player

Playing career^{1}
Years	Club	Games (Goals)
1940, 1944–46	Essendon	12 (9)
1946–48	Camberwell	52
1949–50	Brunswick	

Coaching career
Years	Club	Games (W–L–D)
1949–50	Brunswick	40 (21–16–3) (Note: One of those draws was actually a "no result".)
- ^{1} Playing statistics correct to the end of 1946.

Career highlights
- Camberwell captain 1948; Brunswick best and fairest 1949

Ivor Thomas McIvor (16 September 1917 – 3 April 1997) was an Australian rules footballer who played with Essendon in the Victorian Football League (VFL).

== Career ==
McIvor, a key position player, came to Essendon from local side Don Rovers. He played two games late in the 1940 VFL season, then did not reappear in league football until 1944 due to the war. During the conflict, McIvor served in the Middle East and New Guinea. He returned to the VFL in round 17 of the 1944 season and kept his spot in the side for round 18 and both of Essendon's finals, including a preliminary final. McIvor's six other appearances for Essendon all came in 1946, a year he would finish in the Victorian Football Association (VFA), after moving to Camberwell mid-season, without a clearance.

Despite limited appearances, McIvor was second in Camberwell's 1946 best and fairest award and was also runner-up in the VFL seconds best and fairest, from just four games with Essendon earlier in the year. McIvor played in Camberwell's seven-point loss to Sandringham in the 1946 VFA Grand Final. He remained with Camberwell in 1947 and was appointed club captain in the 1948 VFA season. His performances in 1948 were good enough for him to finish fifth in the J. J. Liston Trophy.

In 1949 and 1950, McIvor was captain-coach of VFA club Brunswick. He won Brunswick's best and fairest award in the 1949 VFA season. Late in the 1950 season, McIvor played a part in a controversial finish against his former club Camberwell. Brunswick trailed by a point when the bell rung, but the umpire did not hear it ring and 15 seconds later McIvor kicked a goal, which gave his side a five-point win. A protest by Camberwell was successful and the VFA declared the game as having "no result".

He captain-coached the Euroa Football Club in 1951 and took them to the grand final, which they lost to Mansfield.
