= Winward =

Winward is a surname. Notable people with the surname include:

- Billy Winward (1920–2015), Australian rules footballer
- Sammy Winward (born 1985), English actress, singer, and model
