= Roy Williams (Australian footballer, born 1907) =

Australian rules footballer, born 1907

Personal information
- Full name: Roy Williams
- Born: 25 October 1907
- Died: 16 August 1979 (aged 71)
- Original team: Gardiner

Playing career^{1}
Years	Club	Games (Goals)
1930	Footscray	9 (10)
- ^{1} Playing statistics correct to the end of 1930.

Roy Williams (25 October 1907 – 16 August 1979) was a former Australian rules footballer who played with Footscray in the Victorian Football League (VFL) and Camberwell Football Club in the Victorian Football Association (VFA).

Williams played with Camberwell in 1928 and 1929, then played nine games with Footscray in 1930, before returning to Camberwell in 1931. Williams was appointed Camberwell captain in 1934, winning the club's best and fairest in the same year. He was third in the 1934 VFA Medal, with 22 votes. Runner-up best and fairest 1935. Fifth in the VFA Medal in 1937 with 21 votes. Williams represented the VFA 1936. On huis retiurement in 1937, Williams 133 games 1928–37.

Williams then coached Camberwell Seconds in 1944 and was non-playing coach of Camberwell Firsts in 1948 and 1949.

He was made a member of the Camberwell FC - Team of Century on the half forward flank in 2003.

Williams was the brother of former Hawthorn footballer, Lyall Williams.
