= 1957 VFA season =

1957 VFA premiership season
- Teams: 14
- Premiers: Moorabbin; 1st premiership
- Minor premiers: Williamstown; 6th minor premiership

The 1957 Victorian Football Association season was the 76th season of the Australian rules football competition. The premiership was won by the Moorabbin Football Club, after it defeated Port Melbourne in the Grand Final on 5 October by forty points. It was Moorabbin's first VFA premiership, won in its seventh season of competition. For Port Melbourne, it was the last of eight consecutive Grand Final appearances between 1950 and 1957, of which only the 1953 premiership was won. Minor premiers Williamstown went through the home-and-home season undefeated, but lost both finals to finish third; it was the only premiership which the club did not win between 1954 and 1959.

== Premiership ==
The home-and-home season was played over twenty matches, before the top four clubs contested a finals series under the Page–McIntyre system to determine the premiers for the season.

=== Ladder ===
1957 VFA ladder
Pos	Team	Pld	W	L	D	PF	PA	PP	Pts
1	Williamstown	20	20	0	0	1784	969	184.1	80
2	Moorabbin (P)	20	15	5	0	1876	1314	142.8	60
3	Port Melbourne	20	14	6	0	1918	1372	139.8	56
4	Preston	20	13	7	0	1784	1460	122.2	52
5	Brunswick	20	13	7	0	1468	1292	113.6	52
6	Coburg	20	12	8	0	1699	1408	120.7	48
7	Box Hill	20	11	9	0	1654	1516	109.1	44
8	Sandringham	20	8	11	1	1362	1528	89.1	34
9	Camberwell	20	8	12	0	1529	1790	85.4	32
10	Yarraville	20	7	12	1	1504	1521	98.9	30
11	Prahran	20	6	13	1	1438	1998	72.0	26
12	Oakleigh	20	5	15	0	1291	1738	74.3	20
13	Northcote	20	4	16	0	1157	1926	60.1	16
14	Brighton	20	2	17	1	1414	2046	69.1	10

Rules for classification: 1) points; 2) percentage; 3) number of points for.
(P) Premiers

=== Finals ===
	Semifinals
Saturday, 14 September	Port Melbourne 19.13 (127)	def.	Preston 7.9 (51)	St Kilda Cricket Ground (crowd: 18,500)
Saturday, 21 September	Williamstown 10.8 (68)	def. by	Moorabbin 9.16 (70)	St Kilda Cricket Ground (crowd: 8,000)

	Preliminary Final
Saturday, 28 September	Williamstown 6.12 (48)	def. by	Port Melbourne 18.12 (120)	St Kilda Cricket Ground (crowd: 22,000)

1957 VFA Grand Final
Saturday, 5 October	Moorabbin	def.	Port Melbourne	St Kilda Cricket Ground (crowd: 26,000)
4.4 (28); 7.6 (48); 10.10 (70); 15.12 (102)	Q1; Q2; Q3; Final	1.7 (13); 4.14 (38); 5.17 (47); 7.20 (62)	Umpires: Jack Irving
Bull 3, Renwick 3, Green 2, Maine 2, Murphy 2, Bulmer, McGaw, Murray	Goals	Evans 2, Bonnett, Monks, Oldfield, Sykes, Withers
Peck (shin)	Injuries	Bonnett (concussion)

== Awards ==
- The leading goalkicker for the home-and-home season for the second consecutive season was Bob Bonnett (Port Melbourne), who kicked 88 goals.
- The J. J. Liston Trophy was won by Ken Ross (Camberwell), who polled 32 votes. Keith White (Box Hill) was second with 27 votes, and Gerry Collins (Coburg) was third with 26 votes.
- Preston won the seconds premiership. Preston 11.12 (78) defeated Moorabbin 5.12 (42) in the Grand Final, played as a curtain raiser to the firsts Grand Final on 5 October.

== Notable events ==
=== Night football ===
The Association experimented with playing premiership matches at night during the 1957 season. Electric floodlighting had recently been installed at the South Melbourne Cricket Ground, and the Victorian Football League had run a successful post-season night premiership in 1956, so the Association secured the venue for its night premiership matches. Under the arrangement, the premier match of each round, as determined by the Association a couple of weeks in advance, was played at South Melbourne at 8pm on the Wednesday night prior to the main round. Thirteen of the fourteen clubs agreed to the arrangement, with only Preston dissenting. The first such match was held on 17 April, with Williamstown 12.10 (82) defeating Moorabbin 9.12 (66), and a large crowd of 14,000 saw Williamstown defeat Port Melbourne the following week.

Inclement weather was the primary concern with the night matches, and there was a contingency to shift the match back to the Saturday if made necessary by conditions, which first occurred on 22 May; recognising that the weather would likely deteriorate further during winter, the Association opted to cancel night matches for June and July, and eventually for the rest of the season – with the exception of an already scheduled interstate match against South Australia in July. In addition to the weather, the disruption of training schedules and the uncertainty surrounding scheduling social events (which represented a large financial penalty when matches were postponed) were problems that some clubs raised after seeing the system in practice.

Wednesday night premiership football returned in 1958, but was again limited to the autumn months before the weather interfered; it did not return in 1959.

=== Interstate matches ===
The Association played three interstate matches during 1957: two against South Australia, and one against a combined team representing the two greater northern Tasmanian leagues (the Northern Tasmanian Football Association and the North West Football Union). Wally Carter (Williamstown) was the coach of the Association team.

	VFA interstate matches in 1957
Saturday, 13 July	N.T.F.A.–N.W.F.U. 12.11 (83)	def. by	V.F.A. 18.8 (116)	York Park, Launceston (crowd: 8,000)
Tuesday, 23 July (night)	V.F.A. 6.8 (44)	def. by	South Australia 11.12 (78)	South Melbourne Cricket Ground (crowd: 3,500)
Tuesday, 20 August (night)	South Australia 20.17 (137)	def.	V.F.A. 8.8 (56)	Norwood Oval, Adelaide (crowd: 9,000)

=== Other notable events ===
- On 4 May, Yarraville defeated Port Melbourne for the first time in 19 years.
- On 25 May, the second half of the match between Oakleigh and Preston was broadcast live on Channel 2, becoming the first Australian rules football game to be broadcast live on television.
- After reading the umpires' reports sheet following a rough match between Preston and Brighton on 22 June, 66-year-old Preston club delegate Mr Les Whitting struck goal umpire Colin Webster on the jaw; Whitting was banned from serving as a club delegate for life, and from holding office at any Association-affiliated club for five years.
- Williamstown was the first team to go undefeated through the home-and-home season since Coburg in 1945; like that Coburg team, Williamstown lost both of its finals to finish third.

== See also ==
- List of VFA/VFL premiers
