= Maurie Hunter =

Australian rules footballer, born 1904

Personal information
- Full name: Maurice Harold Hunter
- Born: 5 March 1904
- Died: 31 October 1987 (aged 83); Fitzroy, Victoria
- Original team: St Patrick's - OMFL
- Height: 180 cm (5 ft 11 in)
- Weight: 72.5 kg (160 lb)

Playing career^{1}
Years	Club	Games (Goals)
1929–1933	Richmond	81 (159)
- ^{1} Playing statistics correct to the end of 1933.

Career highlights
- Richmond captain, 1931; Richmond premiership player, 1932; Interstate games: 4

Maurice Harold Hunter (5 March 1904 – 31 October 1987) was an Australian rules football player who played in the Victorian Football League (VFL) between 1929 and 1933 for the Richmond Football Club.

== Football ==
Prior to joining Richmond he played in four premiership teams with St Patrick's of Albury (NSW) between 1923 and 1928. In 1928 he kicked 19 goals in a semi-final against Wangaratta in the Ovens & Murray Football League.

He left St Patricks in 1929 for Richmond, two years later they made him captain. He was a premiership player in 1932 and the clubs best and fairest in 1933.

In 1934 he was captain / coach of Camberwell in the VFA for the first part of the season, until Horrie Mason took over from Hunter after seven games. Hunter then left Camberwell in July, 1934 to play with Richmond Districts FC in the Melbourne Sub Districts Football Association.

He later coached the Richmond YCW Under 16 team to six premierships between 1940 and 1950.

== Death ==
he died at Fitzroy, Victoria on 31 October 1987.
