= Jack MacDonald (footballer) =

Australian rules footballer (born 1927)

Personal information
- Full name: Jack MacDonald
- Born: 16 May 1927
- Original team: Carey Grammar/Camberwell
- Height: 179 cm (5 ft 10 in)
- Weight: 73 kg (161 lb)

Playing career^{1}
Years	Club	Games (Goals)
1951–1953	Hawthorn	33 (45)
- ^{1} Playing statistics correct to the end of 1953.

Jack MacDonald (born 16 May 1927) was an Australian rules footballer who played with Hawthorn in the Victorian Football League (VFL).

McDonald, from Carey Grammar originally, came to Hawthorn from Camberwell. He had initially trained with Melbourne, but Hawthorn made a claim for him as he was in their residential zone.

After finishing second to Pat Cash in the Hawthorn goal-kicking in his first season, he topped the list in 1952, with 25 goals.
