= Joe Rogers (Australian footballer) =

Australian rules footballer, born 1907

Personal information
- Born: 3 July 1907; Campbells Creek, Victoria, Australia
- Died: 20 August 1966 (aged 59); Geelong, Victoria, Australia
- Height: 175 cm (5 ft 9 in)
- Weight: 79 kg (174 lb)

Playing career^{1}
Years	Club	Games (Goals)
1927–33	Coburg (VFA)	103 (29)
1934–35	Northcote (VFA)	17 (14)
1936–37	North Melbourne	17 (1)
1938–40	Camberwell (VFA)	38 (3)
- ^{1} Playing statistics correct to the end of 1940.

Joseph William Rogers (3 July 1907 – 20 August 1966) was an Australian rules footballer who played with North Melbourne in the Victorian Football League (VFL).

== Family ==
The eldest of the nine children of John Rogers and Harriett Rogers, née Fox, Joseph William Rogers was born at Campbells Creek, Victoria on 3 July 1907.

He married Esther Altie Ross in 1931.

== Football ==
Rogers commenced his senior football career in the Victorian Football Association, initially playing with Coburg, and then with Northcote.

He then spent two years playing with North Melbourne in the Victorian Football League and subsequently played with Camberwell in the Victorian Football Association again.

== Military service ==
Rogers later served in the Australian Army during World War II.

== Death ==
He died at Geelong, Victoria on 20 August 1966.
