= Ross Wright =

Australian rules footballer (born 1952)

Personal information
- Full name: Ross D. Wright
- Born: 28 September 1952 (age 74)
- Original team: East Ringwood
- Height: 187 cm (6 ft 2 in)
- Weight: 85 kg (187 lb)
- Position: Defender

Playing career^{1}
Years	Club	Games (Goals)
1973–74	Essendon	11 (0)
- ^{1} Playing statistics correct to the end of 1974.

Ross Wright (born 28 September 1952) is a former Australian rules footballer who played with Essendon in the Victorian Football League (VFL). He won Essendon's under-19s best and fairest in 1971. Wright later played for Hobart in the Tasmanian Football League from 1975 to 1977, coming runner-up in the league best and fairest in 1976. He then spent five season with Camberwell in the Victorian Football Association (VFA), winning premierships in 1979 and 1981. At a representative level, Wright played for Tasmania in 1976 and the VFA from 1979 to 1981. He finished his career playing for his old side East Ringwood.
