= George Lenne =

Australian rules footballer, born 1916

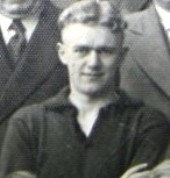

Personal information
- Full name: George Albert Lenne
- Born: 20 February 1916; Surrey Hills, Victoria
- Died: 15 February 2014 (aged 97)
- Original team: Camberwell
- Height: 178 cm (5 ft 10 in)
- Weight: 73 kg (161 lb)

Playing career^{1}
Years	Club	Games (Goals)
1938–39	Camberwell (VFA)	24 (2)
1941–42, 1945	Melbourne	21 (3)
- ^{1} Playing statistics correct to the end of 1945.

George Albert Lenne (20 February 1916 – 15 February 2014) was an Australian rules footballer who played with Melbourne in the Victorian Football League (VFL).
