= Leon Bazin (footballer) =

Australian rules footballer, born 1907

Personal information
- Full name: Leon Louis Francoise Bazin
- Born: 28 June 1907; Carlton, Victoria
- Died: 7 December 1964 (aged 57); West Footscray, Victoria
- Original team: Camberwell (VFA)

Playing career^{1}
Years	Club	Games (Goals)
1930–31	Footscray	13 (2)
- ^{1} Playing statistics correct to the end of 1931.

Leon Louis Francoise Bazin (28 June 1907 – 7 December 1964) was an Australian rules footballer who played with Footscray in the Victorian Football League (VFL).

Bazin played seven senior matches with Victorian Football Association (VFA) club Camberwell in 1927 and 1928 and later played for fellow VFA club Sandringham.
