= Percy Wilson (footballer) =

Australian rules footballer and coach

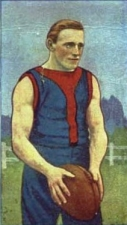

Personal information
- Full name: Percival Edward Wilson
- Born: 31 March 1889; Carlton North, Victoria
- Died: 28 March 1941 (aged 51); Prahran, Victoria
- Original team: Collingwood Trades
- Height: 168 cm (5 ft 6 in)
- Weight: 70 kg (154 lb)
- Positions: Rover, forward

Playing career^{1}
Years	Club	Games (Goals)
1909–1920	Collingwood	183 (71)
1921–1924	Melbourne	51 (20)
Total		234 (91)

Representative team honours
Years	Team	Games (Goals)
	Victoria	2 (?)

Coaching career^{3}
Years	Club	Games (W–L–D)
1921–1923	Melbourne	48 (16–30–2)
1930–1931	Camberwell	?
- ^{1} Playing statistics correct to the end of 1924.^{3} Coaching statistics correct as of 1923.

Career highlights
- 2× VFL premierships: 1910, 1917; Collingwood captain: 1917–1918; Melbourne captain: 1921–1923

Percival Edward Wilson (31 March 1889 – 28 March 1941) was an Australian rules footballer who played with Collingwood and Melbourne in the Victorian Football League (VFL) during the early 1900s.

A rover, Wilson won two premierships with Collingwood. The latter, in 1917, was a captain. In 1921 he moved to the Demons where he became captain and coach of the club.

Wilson coached Camberwell in 1930–31.

== Death ==
Having been ill for several months, he died on 28 March 1941.
