= Keith McGuinness =

Australian rules footballer (1933–2020)

Personal information
- Full name: Keith McGuinness
- Born: 24 March 1933
- Died: 25 September 2020 (aged 87)
- Height: 175 cm (5 ft 9 in)
- Weight: 75 kg (165 lb)

Playing career^{1}
Years	Club	Games (Goals)
1951	South Melbourne	2 (0)
- ^{1} Playing statistics correct to the end of 1951.

Keith McGuinness (24 March 1933 – 25 September 2020) was an Australian rules footballer who played with South Melbourne in the Victorian Football League (VFL).

McGuinness played for the Camberwell Football Club in 1953 and 1954.
