= Les Woodford =

Australian rules footballer

- Woodford in May 1925

Personal information
- Full name: Leslie Victor Woodford
- Born: 11 May 1897; Hawthorn, Victoria
- Died: 23 May 1965 (aged 68); Camberwell, Victoria
- Original team: Camberwell
- Height: 173 cm (5 ft 8 in)
- Weight: 74 kg (163 lb)
- Position: Forward

Playing career^{1}
Years	Club	Games (Goals)
1925	Hawthorn	13 (20)
- ^{1} Playing statistics correct to the end of 1925.

Career highlights
- Hawthorn leading goalkicker: 1925

Leslie Victor Woodford (11 May 1897 – 23 May 1965) was an Australian rules footballer who played with Hawthorn in the Victorian Football League (VFL).

== Family ==
The fourth of five children born to Thomas Edward Woodford (1864–1943) and Eveline Woodford (1867–1919), nee Holditch, Leslie Victor Woodford was born at Hawthorn on 11 May 1897.

In 1919 Les Woodford married Olive Susan Mould (1897–1928) and they had several children together. Following her death in 1928, Woodford married Martha McCullough (1907–1983) in 1930.

== Football ==
Originally from Camberwell, Woodford played for Hawthorn in their inaugural VFL season in 1925. He was the first Hawthorn player to kick five goals in a game, doing so in their round three loss to Collingwood. By the end of the year he had kicked 20 goals, which was enough to top their goal-kicking.

The next season, he returned to Camberwell.

== Honours and achievements ==
Individual

- Hawthorn leading goalkicker: 1925

== Death ==
Les Woodford died at Camberwell in May 1965 and is buried at Burwood Cemetery.
