= Clarrie Shields =

Australian rules footballer (1914–1998)

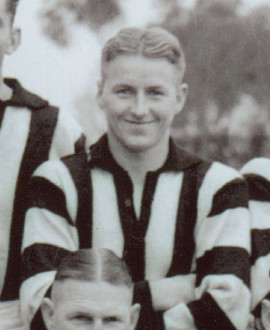
- Shields in 1939

Personal information
- Full name: Clarence Victor Shields
- Born: 21 April 1914; Footscray, Victoria
- Died: 21 June 1998 (aged 84)
- Original team: Camberwell
- Height: 178 cm (5 ft 10 in)
- Weight: 77 kg (170 lb)
- Position: Defence

Playing career^{1}
Years	Club	Games (Goals)
1935–37	Footscray	13 (8)
1938–39	Collingwood	7 (0)
1941–43	St Kilda	26 (5)
Total		46 (13)
- ^{1} Playing statistics correct to the end of 1943.

Clarence Victor Shields (21 April 1914 – 21 June 1998) was an Australian rules footballer who played with Footscray, Collingwood and St Kilda in the Victorian Football League (VFL).
