= Robert Wilkinson (footballer) =

Australian rules footballer

Rob Wilkinson

Personal information
- Full name: Robert Wilkinson
- Born: 25 December 1956 (age 69)
- Original team: Inverloch-Kongwak
- Height: 193 cm (6 ft 4 in)
- Weight: 89 kg (196 lb)
- Position: Ruckman

Playing career^{1}
Years	Club	Games (Goals)
1974, 1979–1980	Hawthorn	17 (9)
- ^{1} Playing statistics correct to the end of 1980.

Robert Wilkinson (born 25 December 1956) is a former Australian rules footballer who played with Hawthorn in the Victorian Football League (VFL).

== Career ==
Wilkinson, a ruckman from Inverloch-Kongwak, started his VFL career for Hawthorn as a 17-year old in the 1974 season. He debuted in Hawthorn's round six loss to Fitzroy at Junction Oval and was picked again the following week against Carlton.

At some point after this he returned to the bush, but in 1979 returned to the Hawthorn lineup for a second stint of league football. He made five appearances for Hawthorn in the 1979 VFL season, which ended in round 20 after he was suspended. The tribunal gave him two-weeks for spitting back at Essendon rover Ken Mansfield. He didn't return to the side in 1980 until round eight and put together nine games for the season. In 1981 he remained at Hawthorn but didn't play senior football.

He continued his career in the Victorian Football Association with Camberwell.
