= Laurie Taylor (footballer, born 1916) =

Australian rules footballer (1916–1991)

Personal information
- Full name: Thomas William Laurence Taylor
- Born: 27 November 1916; Windsor, Victoria
- Died: 4 October 1991 (aged 74); Mount Martha, Victoria
- Original team: Prahran Churches
- Height: 188 cm (6 ft 2 in)
- Weight: 82 kg (181 lb)

Playing career^{1}
Years	Club	Games (Goals)
1937–1938	South Melbourne	4 (0)
1940	St Kilda	1 (0)
1942–1944	Hawthorn	40 (1)
1941; 1945–1947	Camberwell (VFA)	67 (5)
Total		112 (6)
- ^{1} Playing statistics correct to the end of 1947.

Thomas William Laurence Taylor (27 November 1916 – 4 October 1991) was an Australian rules footballer who played with South Melbourne, St Kilda and Hawthorn in the Victorian Football League (VFL).

Taylor played for Camberwell Football Club in 1941 and from 1945 to 1947.
