= Peter Rice (footballer) =

Australian rules footballer (1938–2025)

- Rice in 1959

Personal information
- Full name: James Peter Rice
- Born: 28 February 1938
- Died: 5 June 2025 (aged 87)
- Original team: Camberwell
- Height: 180 cm (5 ft 11 in)
- Weight: 83 kg (183 lb)

Playing career
Years	Club	Games (Goals)
1959–62	South Melbourne	39 (6)

Career highlights
- Richmond fourths best and fairest: 1954

James Peter Rice (28 February 1938 – 5 June 2025) was an Australian rules footballer who played for South Melbourne in the Victorian Football League (VFL) between 1959 and 1962.

Prior to his senior AFL debut, Rice played for Richmond in the VFL reserves competition between 1955 and 1958.

Rice continued to support the Swans in his later years, with a soft spot for fellow number 42 guernsey-wearer Robbie Fox. He died on 5 June 2025, at the age of 87.
