= Mike Delanty =

Australian rules footballer (1936–2021)

Personal information
- Full name: Michael Kenneth Delanty
- Born: 15 October 1936
- Died: 6 July 2021 (aged 84)
- Original team: City
- Debut: Round 3, 1957, Collingwood vs. Geelong, at Kardinia Park
- Height: 185 cm (6 ft 1 in)
- Weight: 83 kg (183 lb)

Playing career^{1}
Years	Club	Games (Goals)
1957–1962	Collingwood	87 (19)
1963–1966	North Melbourne	54 (12)
1967–1969	Camberwell	33 (58)
Total		174 (89)
- ^{1} Playing statistics correct to the end of 1966.

Michael Kenneth Delanty (15 October 1936 – 6 July 2021) was an Australian rules footballer who played for Collingwood and North Melbourne in the Victorian Football League (VFL).

A strong marking half back, Delanty came to Collingwood from Tasmania. He was the centre half-back in his club's 1958 premiership team and also played in the side which lost the 1960 Grand Final.

In 1963 he crossed to North Melbourne and the following season brought up his 100th career game, eventually finishing with 141.

Delanty was captain / coach of VFA – Division Two club, Camberwell Football Club from 1967 to 1969.

He was the older brother of St Kilda player John Delanty and Collingwood player Bob Delanty.

Delanty was inducted into the Tasmanian Football Hall of Fame.
