= Ken Dineen =

Australian rules footballer

Personal information
- Full name: Ken Dineen
- Born: 3 September 1917
- Died: 1 November 2002 (aged 85)
- Original team: Preston
- Height: 182 cm (6 ft 0 in)
- Weight: 86 kg (190 lb)
- Position: Half back / Forward

Playing career^{1}
Years	Club	Games (Goals)
1939–1941, 1944–1945	South Melbourne	47 (50)
- ^{1} Playing statistics correct to the end of 1945.

Ken Dineen (3 September 1917 – 1 November 2002) was an Australian rules footballer who played with South Melbourne in the Victorian Football League (VFL).

Dinnen was a pilot during World War II and his plane was put down by Japanese fighters. He was rescued by the Fuzzy Wuzzy Angels of Papua New Guinea.

Dineen was cleared to Camberwell Football Club midway through 1945.
