= Jim Lawn =

Australian rules footballer, born 1902

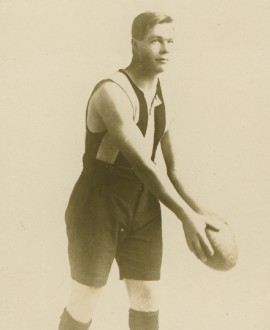
- Lawn during his Collingwood career

Personal information
- Full name: James E. Lawn
- Born: 5 May 1902
- Died: 10 August 1972 (aged 70)
- Original team: Camberwell
- Height: 180 cm (5 ft 11 in)
- Weight: 83 kg (183 lb)

Playing career^{1}
Years	Club	Games (Goals)
1923–1925	Collingwood	35 (37)
- ^{1} Playing statistics correct to the end of 1925.

James E. Lawn (5 May 1902 – 10 August 1972) was an Australian rules footballer who played with Collingwood in the Victorian Football League (VFL).

Lawn was at Collingwood for three seasons and was recruited from Camberwell. His final game for Collingwood was the 1925 VFL Grand Final, which he played from a half forward flank. Collingwood lost to Geelong by 10 points.

Lawn was appointed as captain-coach of Yallourn in 1926, but was initially refused a clearance from Collingwood. Lawn was then captain-coach of Yallourn's 1926 Central Gippsland Football Association's premiership.

Lawn returned to Camberwell and played 108 games and kicked 258 goals between 1927 and 1933. Lawn was captain-coach in 1929 and also won the club best and fairest award.

Lawn played for Yarraville in 1931, then returned to Camberwell in 1932.
