= Wal Gunnyon =

Australian rules footballer (1895-1972)

Personal information
- Full name: Walter Gunnyon
- Born: 16 May 1895; Stawell, Victoria
- Died: 27 December 1972 (aged 77); McKinnon, Victoria
- Height: 183 cm (6 ft 0 in)
- Weight: 83 kg (183 lb)
- Position: Half forward

Playing career
Years	Club	Games (Goals)
1915, 1919–21	South Fremantle	54 (?)
1922–27	St Kilda	63 (21)
1928	Camberwell	?
1929–30	Oakleigh	?

Representative team honours
Years	Team	Games (Goals)
1921	Western Australia	2 (2)

Walter Gunnyon (16 May 1895 – 27 December 1972) was an Australian rules footballer who played with South Fremantle in the West Australian Football League and St Kilda in the VFL in the 1920s.

== Playing career ==
Gunnyon played four seasons with South Fremantle in the West Australian Football League, playing 54 games. He represented Western Australia in the 1921 Perth Carnival.

In 1922 Gunnyon transferred to St Kilda in the VFL going on to play 63 games for the club, the latter games in an unfamiliar defensive role.

Gunnyon was appointed as captain / coach of the Camberwell Football Club in 1928.

He moved across to newly admitted VFA club, Oakleigh in 1929 and played in their 1930 premiership team.

== War service ==
Gunnyon enlisted with the Australian Imperial Force in November 1915, serving in France.
