= Oscar Skalberg =

Australian rules footballer

Personal information
- Full name: Ivan John Skalberg
- Born: 24 September 1929
- Died: 13 November 2006 (aged 77)
- Height: 177 cm (5 ft 10 in)
- Weight: 78 kg (172 lb)

Playing career^{1}
Years	Club	Games (Goals)
1951–52	North Melbourne	9 (1)
- ^{1} Playing statistics correct to the end of 1952.

Ivan John "Oscar" Skalberg (24 September 1929 – 13 November 2006) was an Australian rules footballer who played with North Melbourne in the Victorian Football League (VFL) and Brunswick and Camberwell in the Victorian Football Association (VFA).
