= Harry Brown (Australian footballer) =

Australian rules footballer (1903–1975)

Personal information
- Full name: Harry Brown
- Born: 16 October 1903
- Died: 1975 (aged 71–72)
- Original team: Caulfield / Hawksburn

Playing career^{1}
Years	Club	Games (Goals)
1927	St Kilda	3 (0)
- ^{1} Playing statistics correct to the end of 1927.

Harry Brown (16 October 1903 – 1975) was an Australian rules footballer who played with St Kilda in the Victorian Football League (VFL).

Brown played for Camberwell Football Club in 1928.
