= Jack Kenny (footballer) =

Australian rules footballer, born 1915

Personal information
- Full name: John Patrick Kenny
- Born: 27 May 1915; Camberwell, Victoria
- Died: 26 June 1989 (aged 74)

Playing career^{1}
Years	Club	Games (Goals)
1940	North Melbourne	1 (0)
- ^{1} Playing statistics correct to the end of 1940.

John Patrick Kenny (27 May 1915 – 26 June 1989) was an Australian rules footballer who played with North Melbourne in the Victorian Football League (VFL).

After playing in the North Melbourne reserves in early 1938, Kenny transferred to Victorian Football Association (VFA) club Camberwell and debuted for them on 18 June 1938, against Port Melbourne.

Kenny returned to North Melbourne and made his senior VFL debut in the final round of the 1940 VFL season. It was to be Kenny's only VFL match.
