= Harry Lakin =

Australian rules footballer

Personal information
- Full name: Harry Melville Lakin
- Born: 30 January 1897; Launceston, Tasmania
- Died: 22 September 1978 (aged 81); Parkville, Victoria
- Original team: Launceston

Playing career^{1}
Years	Club	Games (Goals)
1917, 1920	South Melbourne	3 (1)
1926–27	St Kilda	6 (3)
Total		9 (4)
- ^{1} Playing statistics correct to the end of 1927.

Harry Melville Lakin (30 January 1897 – 22 September 1978) was an Australian rules footballer who played with South Melbourne and St Kilda in the Victorian Football League (VFL).

Lakin then played with Camberwell Football Club in 1928.
