= George Rawle =

Australian rules footballer (1889–1978)

Personal information
- Born: 2 December 1889; North Melbourne, Victoria
- Died: 12 June 1978 (aged 88); Essendon, Victoria
- Original team: North Melbourne (VFA)
- Height: 175 cm (5 ft 9 in)
- Weight: 80 kg (176 lb)

Playing career^{1}
Years	Club	Games (Goals)
1923–1925	Essendon	19 (4)
- ^{1} Playing statistics correct to the end of 1925.

George Rawle (2 December 1889 – 12 June 1978) was an Australian rules footballer who played for Essendon in the VFL during the 1920s. Rawle suffered a severe ankle injury as a boy, and the bone calloused, leading to a deformed foot. He tightly bandaged the injured foot, which enabled him to play.

== Family ==
The son of Hubert Trevillian Rawle (1854–1921) and Annie Maria Rawle (née Basedahl; ?–1971), George Rawle was born at North Melbourne, Victoria, on 2 December 1889.

He married Lillian Charlott Allan (1894–1962) in 1917. Their son, Keith, later became an Essendon premiership player.

== Football ==
Rawle was 33 years old when he made his league debut with Essendon in 1923, making him the second-oldest player to debut in history, behind his teammate Charlie Hardy. He was a late inclusion in the 1923 VFL Grand Final, becoming one of just four footballers in history to play in a premiership on debut after Essendon beat Fitzroy by 17 points. The following season, he was a part of the 1924 finals squad that earned another premiership without the need to play a grand final.

The reason many Essendon players started their VFL careers late was because the likes of Rawle, Hardy and Syd Barker had been with North Melbourne in the VFA and joined Essendon when North briefly disbanded in 1921. Rawle's case was slightly different, as he crossed to the VFA club Essendon (A), also sometimes called Essendon Town, (and no relation to the VFL Essendon), and returned to North Melbourne in 1922 as captain-coach before becoming coach of Essendon's seconds in 1923.

His career at North Melbourne had begun in 1911 and he played in their 1914, 1915 and 1918 premierships. After he left Essendon, he returned to the VFA as captain-coach of Camberwell for their inaugural season.
