= Alan Fitcher =

Australian rules footballer

Personal information
- Full name: Alan Angove Fitcher
- Born: 25 February 1908; Carlton North, Victoria
- Died: 26 January 1995 (aged 86); Frankston, Victoria
- Height: 183 cm (6 ft 0 in)
- Weight: 85 kg (187 lb)

Playing career^{1}
Years	Club	Games (Goals)
1929–1936	Fitzroy	98 (21)
- ^{1} Playing statistics correct to the end of 1936.

Alan Angove Fitcher (25 February 1908 – 26 January 1995) was an Australian rules footballer who played with Fitzroy in the Victorian Football League (VFL).

Fitcher, a ruckman, was born in North Carlton and played at Fitzroy for eight seasons. In 1937, Fitcher was cleared to Brighton, a club he would captain-coach in 1938. He led Brighton to the 1938 VFA Grand Final, which they lost to Brunswick. He crossed to Camberwell in 1939. After the war he became a well known journalist with The Sporting Globe newspaper.
