= Del Kennedy =

Australian rules footballer

Personal information
- Full name: Delafield Herbert Kennedy
- Born: 31 July 1923
- Died: 26 November 2015 (aged 92)
- Original team: Braybrook
- Height: 175 cm (5 ft 9 in)
- Weight: 74 kg (163 lb)

Playing career^{1}
Years	Club	Games (Goals)
1943–45	Footscray	17 (1)
- ^{1} Playing statistics correct to the end of 1945.

Delafield Herbert "Del" Kennedy (31 July 1923 – 26 November 2015) was a former Australian rules footballer who played with Footscray in the Victorian Football League (VFL).

Kennedy played 72 games with Camberwell in the VFA from 1946 to 1950.
