= Jack Boothman (footballer) =

Australian rules footballer, born 1906

Personal information
- Full name: John Broadhurst Boothman
- Born: 16 July 1906; Broadford, Victoria
- Died: 14 July 1989 (aged 82); Burwood, Victoria
- Original team: Richmond Central School
- Height: 170 cm (5 ft 7 in)
- Weight: 66 kg (146 lb)

Playing career^{1}
Years	Club	Games (Goals)
1927	Hawthorn	2 (0)
1927–1934	Camberwell (VFA)	95 (38)
- ^{1} Playing statistics correct to the end of 1934.

John Broadhurst Boothman (16 July 1906 – 14 July 1989) was an Australian rules footballer who played for Hawthorn in the Victorian Football League (VFL).

Boothman received many offers from other clubs but played for the Hawthorn Football Club in 1927, two years after they entered the VFL competition. He was the 62nd player to represent the club and wore the #6 guernsey. He was absent from the 1927 team photo due to a knee injury he sustained during that season. Boothman's photo was requested by Hawthorn in 2009 and was displayed in a gallery of the club's past players at their Museum at Waverley Park.

Boothman left Hawthorn halfway through the 1927 season and played out his career as a wing for Camberwell Football Club. His playing career with Camberwell lasted 8 years and resulted in best and fairest awards.
