= Kerry Haywood =

Australian rules footballer

Personal information
- Full name: Kerry Haywood
- Born: 6 May 1950
- Died: 9 August 2010 (aged 60)
- Original team: Brunswick City
- Height: 193 cm (6 ft 4 in)
- Weight: 85 kg (187 lb)
- Position: Ruck

Playing career^{1}
Years	Club	Games (Goals)
1968–72	North Melbourne	55 (5)
- ^{1} Playing statistics correct to the end of 1972.

Kerry Haywood (6 May 1950 – 9 August 2010) was a former Australian rules footballer who played with North Melbourne in the Victorian Football League (VFL).

Haywood played 31 games with Camberwell Football Club in 1979 and 1980. Haywood was a member of Camberwell's 1979 premiership team.
