= Roy Selleck (footballer, born 1909) =

Australian rules footballer

Personal information
- Full name: Roy David Selleck
- Born: 15 August 1909; South Melbourne, Victoria
- Died: 19 October 1972 (aged 63); Mordialloc, Victoria
- Original team: Springvale
- Height: 177 cm (5 ft 10 in)
- Weight: 79 kg (174 lb)

Playing career^{1}
Years	Club	Games (Goals)
1932	South Melbourne	3 (2)
1935–37	Camberwell (VFA)	
- ^{1} Playing statistics correct to the end of 1932.

Roy David Selleck (15 August 1909 – 19 October 1972) was an Australian rules footballer who played for the South Melbourne Football Club in the Victorian Football League (VFL)

Selleck played with Camberwell Football Club in the Victorian Football Association from 1935 to 1937.
