= Reg Whitehead =

Australian rules footballer (1899–1963)

- Whitehead in May 1925

Personal information
- Full name: Joseph Reginald Whitehead
- Born: 25 April 1899; Richmond, Victoria
- Died: 25 December 1963 (aged 64); Heidelberg, Victoria
- Height: 185 cm (6 ft 1 in)
- Weight: 78 kg (172 lb)
- Position: Forward

Playing career^{1}
Years	Club	Games (Goals)
1921	Richmond	2 (2)
1925	Hawthorn	1 (0)
Total		3 (2)
- ^{1} Playing statistics correct to the end of 1925.

Joseph Reginald Whitehead (25 April 1899 – 25 December 1963) was an Australian rules footballer who played with Richmond and Hawthorn in the Victorian Football League (VFL).

== Family ==
The eldest child of Joseph Whitehead (1868-1928), and Margaret Amanda Whitehead (1867-1936), née Smith, Joseph Reginald Whitehead was born in Richmond on 25 April 1899.

He married Beryl Mary Maunsell (1911-1980) on 28 December 1940.

== Cricket ==
A fast bowler, he played with the Richmond Cricket Club's First XI, in the District Cricket competition, over two seasons: 1920/1021 and 1921/1922.

== Football ==
=== Richmond (VFL) ===
Having played with South Melbourne Districts in 1919, Whitehead moved to Richmond where he topped the reserves goal-kicking tally in both 1920 and 1921. He played two senior games for Richmond in the 1921 VFL season.

=== Camberwell (MDL) ===
He left to join Camberwell, then in the Melbourne Districts League. A good year in 1924, where he kicked 68 goals.

=== Hawthorn (VFL) ===
He transferred to Hawthorn when they joined the VFL in 1925. He played at full forward in their first ever VFL match but was dropped after one week and did not play another senior VFL football match.

=== Camberwell (VFA) ===
In 1927 Whitehead was granted a permit to return to Camberwell.

=== Tooronga (MAFA) ===
He played for the Tooronga Football Club in the Metropolitan Amateur Football Association (MAFA) for two seasons: 1928 and 1929.

== Later life ==
Reg Whitehead worked as a trimmer for most of his life.

== Military service ==
He served with the RAAF in World War II.

== Death ==
Whitehead died in the Heidelberg Repatriation Hospital in 1963 and is buried at Springvale Botanical Cemetery.
