= Bob Milgate =

Australian rules footballer

Personal information
- Full name: Robert Bennett Milgate
- Born: 3 January 1925; Auburn, Victoria
- Died: 11 January 1998 (aged 73)
- Original team: Auburn
- Height: 178 cm (5 ft 10 in)
- Weight: 68 kg (150 lb)

Playing career^{1}
Years	Club	Games (Goals)
1948	Hawthorn	10 (15)
1949-1952	Camberwell	61 (171)
- ^{1} Playing statistics correct to the end of 1948.

Career highlights
- Camberwell's leading goalkicker: 1949, 1950 & 1951.

Robert Bennett Milgate (3 January 1925 – 11 January 1998) was an Australian rules footballer who played with Hawthorn in the Victorian Football League (VFL).

Milgate played with Camberwell from 1949 to 1952, winning the club goalkicking award in 1949 (63 goals), 1950 (35) and 1951 (69) and just 4 goals in 1952.

Prior to his football career, Milgate served in the Australian Army during World War II.
