= Allan Jensen (footballer) =

Australian rules footballer

Personal information
- Full name: Allan Jensen
- Born: 31 August 1922
- Died: 24 February 2003 (aged 80)
- Original team: Hawthorn Colts
- Height: 165 cm (5 ft 5 in)
- Weight: 64 kg (141 lb)

Playing career^{1}
Years	Club	Games (Goals)
1943–1944	Hawthorn	12 (3)
- ^{1} Playing statistics correct to the end of 1944.

Allan Jensen (31 August 1922 – 24 February 2003) was an Australian rules footballer who played with Hawthorn in the Victorian Football League (VFL).

Jensen, a Hawthorn Colts player, made one VFL appearance in 1943 and a further 11 in the 1944 season. In 1945 he joined Camberwell.
