= Clive McCorkell =

Australian rules footballer, born 1910

Personal information
- Full name: Joseph Clive McCorkell
- Born: 20 May 1910; Colac, Victoria
- Died: 6 May 1962 (aged 51); Malvern, Victoria
- Original team: Colac

Playing career^{1}
Years	Club	Games (Goals)
1933	Essendon	7 (1)
1934	Camberwell (VFA)	2 (0)
- ^{1} Playing statistics correct to the end of 1934.

Joseph Clive McCorkell (20 May 1910 – 6 May 1962) was an Australian rules footballer who played with Essendon in the Victorian Football League (VFL).

McCorkell played with Camberwell in 1934 and broke his leg in round three against Sandringham.
