= Lew Gough =

Australian rules footballer

Personal information
- Full name: Lewis James Gough
- Born: 1 September 1903; Yarck, Victoria
- Died: 26 December 1934 (aged 31); Boronia, Victoria
- Original team: Box Hill City
- Height: 187 cm (6 ft 2 in)
- Weight: 87 kg (192 lb)

Playing career^{1}
Years	Club	Games (Goals)
1925, 1932	Hawthorn	12 (17)
1926–1929	Camberwell (VFA)	19 (28)
1930–1931	Melbourne	5 (0)
1932–1933	Prahran (VFA)	14 (12)
Total		50 (57)
- ^{1} Playing statistics correct to the end of 1932.

Lewis James Gough (1 September 1903 – 26 December 1934) was an Australian Rules footballer who played with Hawthorn and Melbourne in the Victorian Football League (VFL).

== Family ==
The son of Lewis William Gough (1864–1928) and Margaret Gough (1866–1956), nee Clinton, Lewis James Gough was born at Yarck on 1 September 1903.

In 1928 Gough married Ailsa Elizabeth Shand Murray (1908–1980) and they had a daughter (Helen) and son (John) together.

== Football ==
Cleared from a Box Hill junior team to Hawthorn in June 1925, Gough played the last eight games of the VFL season.

Gough then spent the next four years in the VFA with Camberwell before joining Melbourne in 1930. He played a solitary match in his first season with Melbourne and then played four more games in 1931 when regular full back Bill Tymms took leave to go on his honeymoon.

He was injured in his first match back at Hawthorn in 1932 but made three more appearances before he was cleared to VFA club Prahran midway through the season.

Gough coached Prahran in the VFA 1933 but became ill later in the season and was unable to continue as coach.

== Death ==
Gough did not recover from his illness and he died at the age of 31 late the next year. He is buried at Box Hill Cemetery.
