= Ted Jarrard =

Australian rules footballer (1922–2010)

Personal information
- Born: 15 April 1922
- Died: 25 November 2010 (aged 88)
- Original team: West Melbourne
- Height: 180 cm (5 ft 11 in)
- Weight: 77 kg (170 lb)

Playing career^{1}
Years	Club	Games (Goals)
1944–1953	North Melbourne	130 (11)
1954	Camberwell	12 (?)
Total		142 (11)
- ^{1} Playing statistics correct to the end of 1953.

Career highlights
- North Melbourne: Team of the Century

Ted Jarrard (15 April 1922 – 25 November 2010) was an Australian rules footballer in the Victorian Football League (VFL).

Jarrard joined North Melbourne in 1944. He was a member of the 1950 North Melbourne Grand Final side. He retired in 1953. In 2001 Jarrad was named on the half back flank in the North Melbourne Team of the Century.

He was captain / coach of Camberwell Football Club in 1954. Jarrard later had stints at Fitzroy Rovers and Jeparit.

Jarrard died on 25 November 2010, at the age of 88.
