= Dick Abikhair =

Australian rules footballer, born 1914

Personal information
- Full name: Richard Abikhair
- Born: 7 July 1914; Rushworth, Victoria
- Died: 20 August 1962 (aged 48); Arden St Oval, North Melbourne
- Original team: Rushworth
- Height: 180 cm (5 ft 11 in)
- Weight: 79 kg (174 lb)

Playing career^{1}
Years	Club	Games (Goals)
1934–1938	Hawthorn	60 (10)
1939-1940	Camberwell	
1941–1945	North Melbourne	60 (2)
Total		120 (12)
- ^{1} Playing statistics correct to the end of 1945.

Richard Abikhair (7 July 1914 – 20 August 1962) was an Australian rules footballer who played with Hawthorn and North Melbourne. Of Lebanese descent, Abikhair usually played as a rover or in the back pocket. His career was partially shortened by the declaration of World War II.

Abikhair was captain-coach of Casterton Football Club when they defeated Hamilton to win the 1939 Western District Football League grand final. In 1946 he played some games with Prahran

Abikhair was appointed the Captain-Coach of Edenhope in the Kowree Naracootre FL from 1950 to 1952, they were premiers in 1950. He retired from playing after the 1952 season.

Following his playing career, Abikhair began coaching at the amateur level in 1953. While coaching the Carlton Rovers in the Sunday Amateur Football League he received a bomb threat to his Clifton Hill home. League secretary W. H. Linnington also received similar threats to his Brunswick home. Police patrolled the area and nothing materialised of the threats.

== Sources ==
- Holmesby, Russell & Main, Jim (2007). The Encyclopedia of AFL Footballers. 7th ed. Melbourne: Bas Publishing.
