= Colin Judd =

Australian rules footballer

Personal information
- Full name: Colin Judd
- Born: 3 June 1956 (age 70)
- Original team: Surrey Hills
- Height: 178 cm (5 ft 10 in)
- Weight: 67 kg (148 lb)

Playing career^{1}
Years	Club	Games (Goals)
1973	Hawthorn	2 (0)
- ^{1} Playing statistics correct to the end of 1973.

Colin Judd (born 3 June 1956) is a former Australian rules footballer who played with Hawthorn in the Victorian Football League (VFL). He later played 134 games for Camberwell in the VFA.
