= David Sullivan (footballer) =

Australian rules footballer

Personal information
- Born: 15 May 1966 (age 60)
- Original team: St Kevin's
- Height: 184 cm (6 ft 0 in)
- Weight: 86 kg (190 lb)
- Position: Forward

Playing career^{1}
| Years | Club | Games (Goals) |
| 1986 | Hawthorn | 1 (0) |
| 1987–1988 | Essendon | 10 (14) |
| Total | | 11 (14) |
- ^{1} Playing statistics correct to the end of 1988.

David Sullivan (born 15 May 1966) is a former Australian rules footballer who played with Hawthorn and Essendon in the Victorian Football League (VFL).

Sullivan, a forward, captained Hawthorn at Under 19s level. He made his only senior appearance for Hawthorn in 1986, a premiership year. The St Kevins recruit played in Hawthorn's three point win over North Melbourne at the MCG in round two. He played five games for Essendon the following year, all in the second half of the season, then appeared in the first five rounds in 1988. In March 1989, just before the beginning of the season, Sullivan lost his place on the Essendon list, and he signed for VFA club Camberwell.

He kicked 26 goals in a game for NSW club Blighty, against the Deniliquin Rovers, in the 1999 Picola & District Football League season.
