= John Frazer (Australian footballer) =

Australian rules footballer

Personal information
- Full name: John Frazer
- Born: 12 January 1956 (age 70)
- Original team: North Melbourne Colts
- Height: 191 cm (6 ft 3 in)
- Weight: 91 kg (201 lb)

Playing career^{1}
Years	Club	Games (Goals)
1976–1977	North Melbourne	10 (27)
1978–1979	Fitzroy	6 (10)
Total		16 (37)
- ^{1} Playing statistics correct to the end of 1979.

John Frazer is a former Australian rules footballer who played with North Melbourne and Fitzroy in the Victorian Football League (VFL).

Frazer played 14 games with VFA club, Camberwell Football Club in 1987, kicking 91 goals!
