= Alan Thynne =

Australian rules footballer

Personal information
- Full name: Alan Thynne
- Born: 16 October 1928
- Died: 9 June 1971 (aged 42)
- Original team: Carlton District
- Height: 178 cm (5 ft 10 in)
- Weight: 72 kg (159 lb)

Playing career^{1}
Years	Club	Games (Goals)
1949–1951	Carlton	15 (5)
- ^{1} Playing statistics correct to the end of 1951.

Alan Thynne (16 October 1928 – 9 June 1971) was an Australian rules footballer who played for the Carlton Football Club in the Victorian Football League (VFL).

Following the end of his career with Carlton, Thynne spent three years with Victorian Football Association (VFA) club Camberwell, playing 42 games.
