= Dick O'Shea =

Australian rules footballer, born 1909

Personal information
- Full name: Richard Laurence O'Shea
- Born: 31 January 1909; Seymour, Victoria
- Died: 10 October 1998 (aged 89)
- Original team: North Melbourne District
- Height: 185 cm (6 ft 1 in)
- Weight: 92 kg (203 lb)

Playing career^{1}
Years	Club	Games (Goals)
1930–31	North Melbourne	14 (8)
1932	Essendon	7 (0)
Total		21 (8)
- ^{1} Playing statistics correct to the end of 1932.

Richard Laurence O'Shea (31 January 1909 – 10 October 1998) was an Australian rules footballer who played with North Melbourne and Essendon in the Victorian Football League (VFL).

O'Shea played with Victorian Football Association (VFA) clubs Camberwell in 1934 and Northcote from 1935 to 1937 and then Fairfield from 1938 to 1940.

O'Shea also later served in the Australian Army during World War II.
