= Roy Laing =

Australian rules footballer

Personal information
- Full name: William Roy Laing
- Born: 4 April 1893; Murtoa, Victoria
- Died: 11 April 1972 (aged 79); Glen Iris, Victoria
- Original team: Beverley Juniors
- Height: 170 cm (5 ft 7 in)
- Weight: 80 kg (176 lb)

Playing career^{1}
Years	Club	Games (Goals)
1913–15, 1918–25	Essendon	131 (3)
- ^{1} Playing statistics correct to the end of 1925.

William Roy Laing (4 April 1893 – 11 April 1972) was an Australian rules footballer who played for Essendon in the Victorian Football League (VFL) before and after the First World War.

Laing, originally from Western Australia, was recruited to Essendon from the Beverley Juniors in Richmond. A half back flanker, he was a member of Essendon's back to back premiership teams in 1923 and 1924. He represented the Victorian interstate side five times, one of them as captain against South Australia in 1921. Laing was considered to be likely to move to the Hawthorn Football Club when they entered the league in 1925, but this did not occur. In 1937 and 1938, Laing was non playing coach of Camberwell.
