= Reuben Holland =

Australian rules footballer

Personal information
- Full name: Reuben Thomas Henry Holland
- Born: 27 June 1890; Richmond, Victoria
- Died: 22 September 1944 (aged 54); Camberwell, Victoria

Playing career^{1}
Years	Club	Games (Goals)
1908	South Melbourne	1 (1)
1909	Camberwell	
1910	Carlton	2 (3)
Total		3 (4)
- ^{1} Playing statistics correct to the end of 1910.

Reuben Thomas Henry Holland (27 June 1890 – 22 September 1944) was an Australian rules footballer who played with South Melbourne and Carlton in the Victorian Football League (VFL).
