= Bill Luff =

Australian rules footballer

Personal information
- Full name: William Norman Charles Luff
- Born: 25 December 1909; Richmond, Victoria
- Died: 9 October 1981 (aged 71); Heidelberg, Victoria
- Original team: Camberwell
- Height: 179 cm (5 ft 10 in)
- Weight: 79 kg (174 lb)
- Position: Forward

Playing career^{1}
| Years | Club | Games (Goals) |
| 1931-1933, 1935 | Camberwell | 77 (314) |
| 1934, 1936-1940 | Essendon | 82 (37) |
- ^{1} Playing statistics correct to the end of 1940.

Career highlights
- VFA Goalkicking Award: 1933 (106) & 1935 (75); VFA Rep Side: 1932; Camberwell FC: Team of the Century

William Luff (25 December 1909 – 9 October 1981) was an Australian rules footballer who played for Essendon in the Victorian Football League (VFL).

== Football ==
The son of Richmond's Bill Luff Sr., Luff was a good forward at Camberwell before he came to Essendon and topped the VFA's goal-kicking in 1933 with 106 goals. He continued this form when he arrived at Essendon the following season and kicked four goals on debut and five goals in just his third match.

He then returned to Camberwell in 1935 and again was the league's top goal-kicker, bagging 75 goals. The next five seasons were spent back with Essendon, who were suffering from a rare finals drought.

== Camberwell "Team of the Century" ==
In 2003, Luff was announced as a forward pocket in the official Camberwell "Team of the Century".
