= Ben Main =

Australian rules footballer (1887–1958)

Personal information
- Full name: Benjamin Ash Main
- Born: 20 May 1887; Richmond, Victoria
- Died: 4 July 1958 (aged 71); Glen Iris, Victoria
- Original team: Camberwell

Playing career^{1}
Years	Club	Games (Goals)
1911	South Melbourne	1 (0)
- ^{1} Playing statistics correct to the end of 1911.

Benjamin Ash Main (20 May 1887 – 4 July 1958) was an Australian rules footballer who played for the South Melbourne Football Club in the Victorian Football League (VFL).

== Family ==
The son of Lawrence Drew Main, and Frances Main, née Hall, Benjamin Ash Main was born in Richmond, Victoria on 20 May 1887.

He married Ida May Holyoak (1891–1950) in 1921.

== Football ==
He played one senior game with South Melbourne, against St Kilda, on 13 May 1911, replacing the injured Bill Thomas.

A number of the contemporary newspaper reports identify him as "Maine"; for example, the local newspaper The (Emerald Hill) Record, (Saturday, 20 May 1911), p.5: "Maine, from the country, who certainly did not impress me; but who, with experience, might develop into a footballer of the [Harry] Lampe type".

== Death ==
He died at a private hospital on 4 July 1958.
