= Ken Munro =

Australian rules footballer

Personal information
- Full name: Kenneth William Munro
- Born: 14 March 1922; Elsternwick, Victoria
- Died: 2 October 2017 (aged 95)
- Original team: Camberwell
- Height: 175 cm (5 ft 9 in)
- Weight: 67 kg (148 lb)

Playing career^{1}
Years	Club	Games (Goals)
1946–47	Hawthorn	6 (0)
- ^{1} Playing statistics correct to the end of 1947.

Kenneth William Munro (14 March 1922 – 2 October 2017) was an Australian rules footballer who played with Hawthorn in the Victorian Football League (VFL).

Prior to playing for Hawthorn, Munro served in both the Australian Army and the Royal Australian Air Force during World War II.
