= Tommy Laskey =

Australian rules footballer, born 1913

Personal information
- Full name: Thomas James Alexander Laskey
- Born: 29 March 1913; Carlton North, Victoria
- Died: 14 January 1997 (aged 83)
- Original team: Brunswick / Camberwell
- Height: 163 cm (5 ft 4 in)
- Weight: 66 kg (146 lb)

Playing career^{1}
Years	Club	Games (Goals)
1937	Fitzroy	4 (2)
- ^{1} Playing statistics correct to the end of 1937.

Thomas James Alexander Laskey (29 March 1913 – 14 January 1997) was an Australian rules footballer who played with Fitzroy in the Victorian Football League (VFL).
