= Marcus Boyall =

Australian rules footballer (1917–1985)

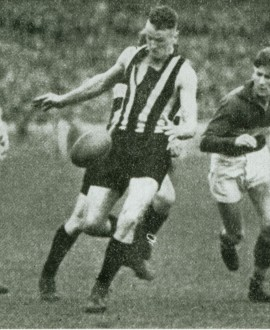
- Boyall during his Collingwood career

Personal information
- Full name: Marcus Mario William Boyall
- Born: 8 October 1917; Carlton, Victoria
- Died: 30 September 1985 (aged 67); Heidelberg, Victoria
- Original team: Collingwood Tech
- Height: 188 cm (6 ft 2 in)
- Weight: 78 kg (172 lb)

Playing career^{1}
Years	Club	Games (Goals)
1935–38, 1944–45	Collingwood (VFL)	50 (29)
1940–48	Glenelg (SANFL)	49 (79)
Total		99 (128)
- ^{1} Playing statistics correct to the end of 1948.

Career highlights
- Glenelg Best and Fairest 1941; Magarey Medallist 1941

Marcus Boyall (8 October 1917 – 30 September 1985) was an Australian rules footballer best known for his playing career with Victorian Football League (VFL) club Collingwood and South Australian National Football League (SANFL) club Glenelg in the 1930s and 1940s.

== VFL career ==
Boyall debuted for Collingwood as a 16-year-old in the 1935 VFL season. He was not an automatic selection immediately – indeed in 1936 Boyall won the Gardiner Medal for best and fairest in the VFL reserves competition. By the end of 1936 he had played only four Senior games.

In 1937 Boyall continued to improve in the key position of Centre half-back and his future with Collingwood seemed bright. In 1938 he came equal third in the Brownlow Medal, the League's award for best and fairest.

== SANFL career ==
In 1939 Boyall sought to move from Collingwood to Glenelg in the SANFL but Collingwood refused to clear him. After standing out of football for a year (thus negating Collingwood's claim to his services) Boyall was then able to join Glenelg for the 1940 season. Initially Boyall was both captain and coach, but struggled with the dual role and resigned these appointments midway through 1940. His form improved almost immediately.

That Glenelg had recruited "an established Victorian" was borne out when he won SANFL's highest individual award, the Magarey Medal in 1941.

Boyall briefly returned to play for Collingwood during the war years of 1944–1945, but finished his playing career with Victorian Football Association (VFA) club Camberwell, which he coached in 1947.

In 1960 Boyall returned to Glenelg as coach for that season, but without success.
