= Jim Bradford (footballer) =

Australian rules footballer

Personal information
- Born: 2 March 1926
- Died: 8 March 2005 (aged 79)
- Original team: Abbotsford

Playing career^{1}
Years	Club	Games (Goals)
1943	Collingwood	7 (16)
1949	North Melbourne	9 (8)
1950-1954	West Torrens	76 (197)
Total		92 (221)
- ^{1} Playing statistics correct to the end of 1954.

Career highlights
- 1953 West Torrens Premiership player

Jim "Nipper" Bradford (2 March 1926 – 8 March 2005) was an Australian rules football player. He played seven games with Collingwood in 1943, and nine with North Melbourne in 1949.

He was the shortest player ever to play Australian rules football at the highest level. He stood five feet tall (152 centimetres).

Bradford played 76 games for Camberwell and kicked 169 goals (1945–48). He won Camberwell's best and fairest in 1945, 1946.

He was named as the rover in Camberwell Football Club's Team of the Century.
