= Frank Stubbs (Australian footballer) =

Australian rules footballer

Personal information
- Full name: Frank William Stubbs
- Born: 27 September 1919
- Died: 16 May 1997 (aged 77)
- Original team: Fawkner
- Height: 192 cm (6 ft 4 in)
- Weight: 95 kg (209 lb)
- Position: Ruckman

Playing career^{1}
Years	Club	Games (Goals)
1937–1941, 1945–1946	North Melbourne	66 (17)
1947–1951	Camberwell	70 (-)
- ^{1} Playing statistics correct to the end of 1946.

Frank William Stubbs (27 September 1919 – 16 May 1997) was an Australian rules footballer who played for North Melbourne in the Victorian Football League (VFL).

Used in the ruck, Stubbs had two stints at North Melbourne, separated by World War II. He was North Melbourne's best placed player at the 1940 Brownlow Medal, with nine votes. Stubbs returned in 1945 and participated in their first ever finals match.

Stubbs finished his career at Camberwell, where he won each of their 'Best and Fairest' awards from 1948 to 1950. He also won the J. J. Liston Trophy in 1950, the club's first ever winner.

In 2003 he was named as the first ruckman in the club's Team of the Century.
