= Tom Elliott (Australian footballer) =

Australian rules footballer, born 1901

Personal information
- Full name: Thomas Bernard Elliott
- Born: 29 March 1901; Rutherglen, Victoria
- Died: 11 June 1974 (aged 73); Brighton, Victoria
- Original team: Junee Junction

Playing career^{1}
Years	Club	Games (Goals)
1923–24	Melbourne	11 (2)
- ^{1} Playing statistics correct to the end of 1924.

Thomas Bernard Elliott (29 March 1901 – 11 June 1974) was an Australian rules footballer who played with Melbourne in the Victorian Football League (VFL).

== Death ==
He died at a private hospital on 11 June 1974.
