= Tom Spear =

Australian rules footballer

Personal information
- Full name: Thomas Robert Spear
- Born: 15 November 1919; Hawthorn, Victoria
- Died: 17 November 1968 (aged 49); Malbina, Tasmania
- Original team: Camberwell
- Height: 178 cm (5 ft 10 in)
- Weight: 85 kg (187 lb)

Playing career^{1}
Years	Club	Games (Goals)
1944–47	Hawthorn	30 (0)
- ^{1} Playing statistics correct to the end of 1947.

Thomas Robert Spear (15 November 1919 – 17 November 1968) was an Australian rules footballer who played with Hawthorn in the Victorian Football League (VFL).

Spear was captain-coach of Matong Football Club in 1950, who finished 5th on the ladder.
