= Pat Farrelly (Australian footballer) =

Australian rules footballer (1913–2007)

Personal information
- Full name: Pat Farrelly
- Born: 28 May 1913
- Died: 6 August 2007 (aged 94)
- Original team: City (Launceston)
- Height: 190 cm (6 ft 3 in)
- Weight: 87.5 kg (193 lb)

Playing career^{1}
Years	Club	Games (Goals)
1937	Carlton	7 (7)
1938	South Melbourne	6 (1)
1939-1941	Camberwell	
Total		13 (8)
- ^{1} Playing statistics correct to the end of 1938.

Pat Farrelly (28 May 1913 – 6 August 2007) was an Australian rules footballer who played with Carlton and South Melbourne in the Victorian Football League (VFL).

In 1939 he moved on to VFA club Camberwell for greater reward, and played there until he enlisted in the Australian Army in 1941.
