= John Benison =

Australian rules footballer

Personal information
- Full name: John Benison
- Born: 9 August 1946 (age 80)
- Original team: Reservoir Old Boys
- Height: 183 cm (6 ft 0 in)
- Weight: 85 kg (187 lb)

Playing career^{1}
Years	Club	Games (Goals)
1966–70	Fitzroy	52 (2)
- ^{1} Playing statistics correct to the end of 1970.

John Benison (born 9 August 1946) is a former Australian rules footballer who played with Fitzroy in the Victorian Football League (VFL).
