= Eric Poole (footballer) =

Australian rules footballer

Personal information
- Full name: Eric Poole
- Born: 29 August 1903; Sassafras, Tasmania
- Died: 23 February 1968 (aged 64); Preston, Victoria
- Original team: Burnie (Tas)

Playing career^{1}
| Years | Club | Games (Goals) |
| 1926 | Camberwell (VFA) | 5 (0) |
| 1928–29 | Yarraville (VFA) | 21 (2) |
| 1929 | South Melbourne | 4 (0) |
- ^{1} Playing statistics correct to the end of 1929.

Eric Poole (29 August 1903 – 23 February 1968) was an Australian rules footballer who played with South Melbourne in the Victorian Football League (VFL).

Poole originally played with Burnie in Tasmania before moving to Victoria to play with Collingwood. He did not manage to break in to the senior team and in the middle of the season was granted a permit to move to Camberwell in the Victorian Football Association.

In 1928 he moved to Yarraville Football Club and after a successful 1928 season was recruited by South Melbourne. He played four VFL games before dropping out of the South Melbourne team and he subsequently returned to Yarraville before the end of the season.
