= Alf Benison =

Australian rules footballer

Personal information
- Full name: Alf Benison
- Born: 21 June 1918
- Died: 12 May 1979 (aged 60)
- Original team: Richmond Seconds / Burnley
- Height: 185 cm (6 ft 1 in)
- Weight: 91 kg (201 lb)

Playing career^{1}
Years	Club	Games (Goals)
1939–1944	South Melbourne	42 (32)
1944	Footscray	9 (6)
Total		51 (38)
- ^{1} Playing statistics correct to the end of 1944.

Alf Benison (21 June 1918 – 12 May 1979) was an Australian rules footballer who played for the South Melbourne Football Club and Footscray Football Club in the Victorian Football League (VFL).

Benison played with Camberwell Football Club in 1946.
