= Richard Greenwood (Australian footballer) =

Australian rules footballer, born 1905

Personal information
- Full name: Richard Greenwood
- Born: 20 July 1905
- Died: 18 September 1987 (aged 82)
- Original team: Camberwell (VFA)
- Height: 177 cm (5 ft 10 in)
- Weight: 80 kg (176 lb)

Playing career^{1}
Years	Club	Games (Goals)
1927–28	Camberwell	? (?)
1929–30	Footscray	11 (0)
1930–32	Camberwell	? (?)
- ^{1} Playing statistics correct to the end of 1930.

Career highlights
- 1932: VFA v VFL. Played on the half back flank for VFA team

Richard Greenwood (20 July 1905 – 18 September 1987) was a former Australian rules footballer who played with Footscray in the Victorian Football League (VFL).
