= Jim Cowell (Australian footballer) =

Australian rules footballer

Personal information
- Full name: James Richard Cowell
- Born: 28 May 1885; Heidelberg, Victoria
- Died: 6 December 1956 (aged 71); Burwood, Victoria
- Original team: Mentone College
- Position: Follower

Playing career^{1}
Years	Club	Games (Goals)
1902–08	St Kilda	92 (27)
1909	Melbourne	7 (1)
Total		99 (28)
- ^{1} Playing statistics correct to the end of 1909.

James Richard Cowell (28 May 1885 – 6 December 1956) was an Australian rules footballer who played with St Kilda and Melbourne in the Victorian Football League (VFL). In 1919, he was cleared to coach Camberwell in the Victorian Football Association (VFA).
