= Billy Winward =

Australian rules footballer

Personal information
- Full name: William Michael Winward
- Born: November 9, 1920
- Died: June 4, 2015 (aged 94)
- Height: 185 cm (6 ft 1 in)
- Weight: 77 kg (170 lb)

Playing career^{1}
Years	Club	Games (Goals)
1946	St Kilda	1 (0)
- ^{1} Playing statistics correct to the end of 1946.

Billy Winward (9 November 1920 - 4 June 2015) was an Australian rules footballer who played with St Kilda in the Victorian Football League (VFL).

Winward played with Camberwell Football Club in 1945.
