= Reg Horkings =

Australian rules footballer, born 1919

Personal information
- Full name: Reginald Horkings
- Born: 20 June 1919; Carlton, Victoria
- Died: 18 May 2007 (aged 87)
- Height: 170 cm (5 ft 7 in)
- Weight: 66 kg (146 lb)

Playing career^{1}
Years	Club	Games (Goals)
1937–41	Camberwell (VFA)	77 (7)
1942–44	Hawthorn	34 (2)
1945–51	Camberwell (VFA)	33 (6)
- ^{1} Playing statistics correct to the end of 1951.

Reginald Horkings (20 June 1919 – 18 May 2007) was an Australian rules footballer who played with Hawthorn in the Victorian Football League (VFL).
