= Boot and shoe clicker =

Person who cuts leather for making footwear

A boot and shoe clicker is the person who cuts the uppers for boots or shoes from a skin of leather or piece of man-made material (usually from a bulk roll). This includes all components of the upper, including linings, facings, stiffeners, reinforcements for eyelets and zip-protectors.

The job was historically named prior to mechanisation, due to the sound of the operator's hand-knife blade rattling against the brass edge-binding (including the joints in the binding) used to protect the board patterns which were overlaid on to the skin.

In larger factories there would be many hand-clickers in close proximity to one another, hence there would be many clicks per second, so the informal description became known as clicking by clickers.

It is a skilled trade because it is the clicker's responsibility to maximise the number of uppers which can be cut from skins of leather, avoiding any thin and damaged areas, and incorporating the (unseen) 'lines' of stretch and resistance which naturally occur in leather according to the style and construction of the particular shoe. Another major criterion is the need to colour-shade the respective parts of the shoe uppers which are cut as a pair, not only matching the colour variations but also considering the surface finish and grain texture.

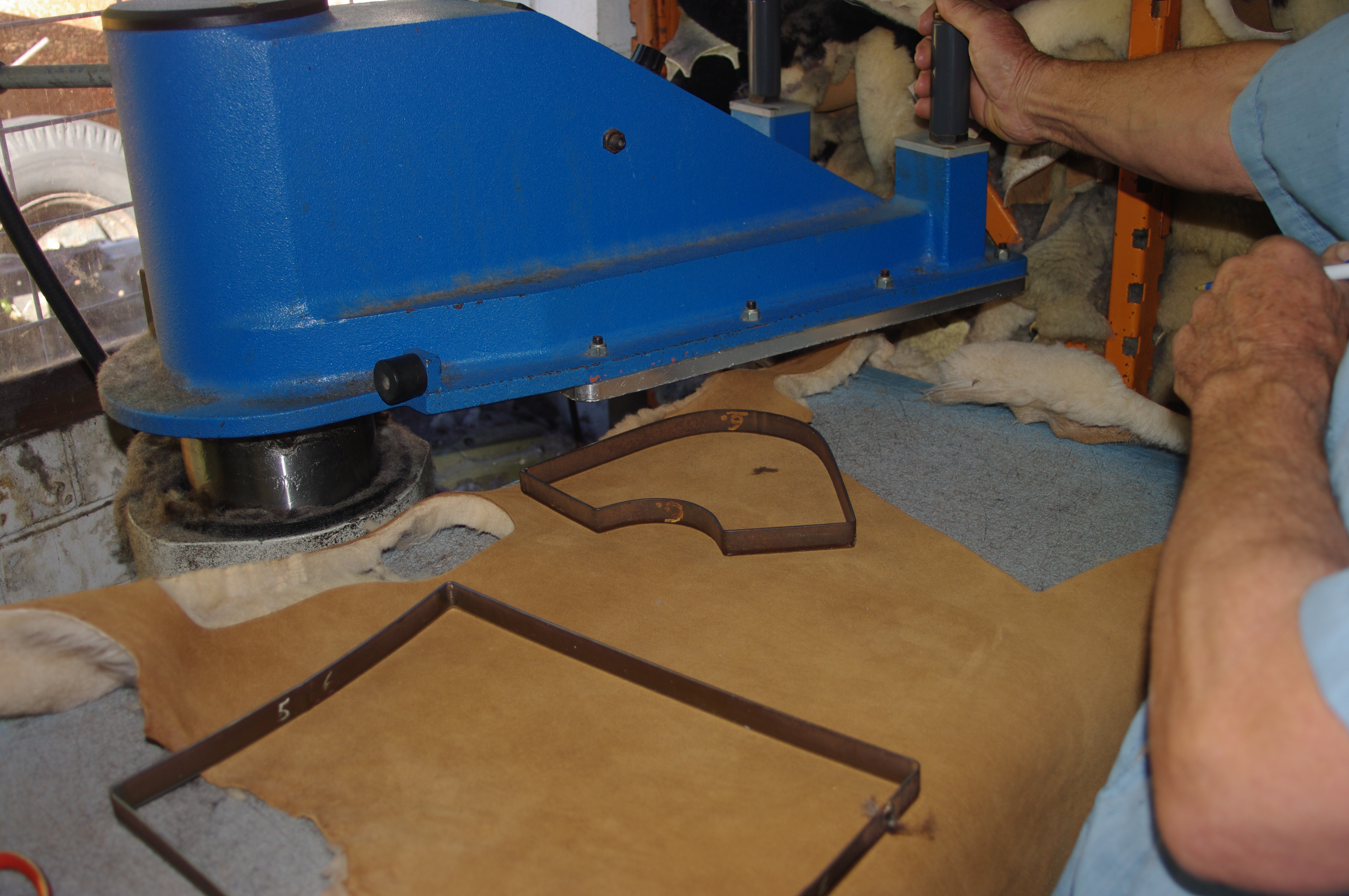
Placing sharpened-edge steel patterns on to sheepskin, the hydraulic machine has a swivelling cutting head with two vertical handles, each having an embedded button for thumb operation, a safety device to prevent accidental actuation of the vertical cutting-stroke

During the late 1960s synthetic leathers called pormerics were first introduced, and together with fabrics these also had lines of stretch and tension, being based on a traditional woven base having threads of warp and weft.

Following the introduction of electrical/mechanised presses, the sounds changed entirely to a heavy thump and/or crack, with the board pattern with hand-knife being replaced by a 'knife' similar to a pastry cutter, although the operator still needed to learn hand-clicking as part of the training.

Hand-clicking skills are still needed in low-volume production of bespoke, hand-made shoes or as sales-samples for factory production, although these would not warrant the expense of brass-binding used to protect the edges of the pattern from being pared away.

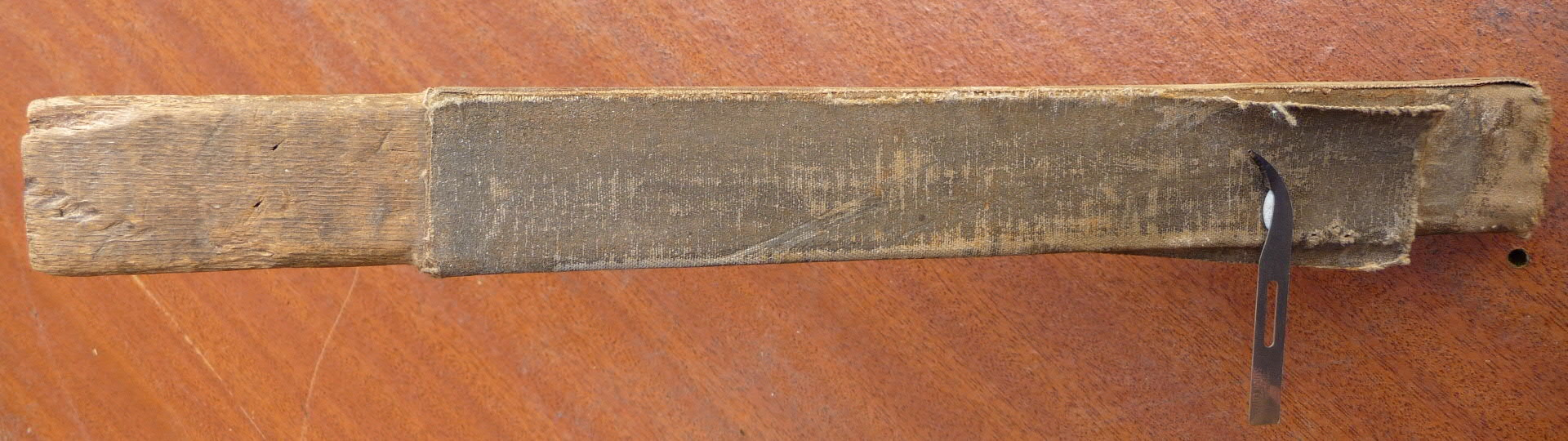
A vintage Rap Stick from 1940s used for sharpening a clicker's knife

The clicker's knife regularly needed sharpening, which was done with an implement called a rap stick. To use a rap stick, a right-handed operator would hold it in the left hand, resting the stick on the workbench for support, stroking the blade rapidly but gently back and forth on the abrasive surface to maintain a sharp edge whilst hand-cutting, in a similar fashion to a butcher's knife and sharpening steel. The knife blade shown is a lighter medical item but approximates the shape of a clicker's knife blade, fitting into a comfortable wooden handle with screw-activated jaws. The main surface is emery cloth wrapped over the edge to form a round section where the curved blade can nestle and be sharpened; the top edge is sharper and square in cross-section, with a fine-grain aluminium oxide abrasive strip used for tip-sharpening. On the reverse side is a heavy-leather smooth strop, to address any metal burrs left by the abrasive process.

== Bottom stock materials ==
Similar processes are used in preparing materials for the sole and heel of shoes, known as bottom stock, although the materials, whether natural leathers, rubbers or synthetics, are heavier for durability. The clicker would also cut these materials in a small manufacturing facility, whereas larger-scale production would have dedicated operators.

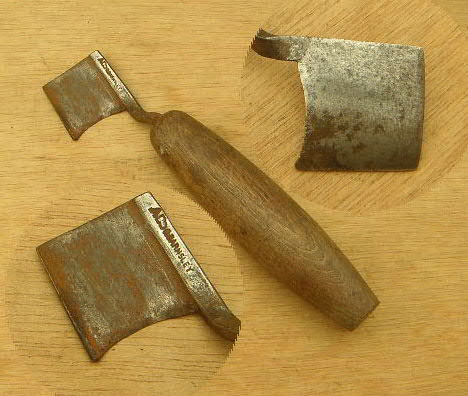
Leather cutter's drag knife, for heavy leathers

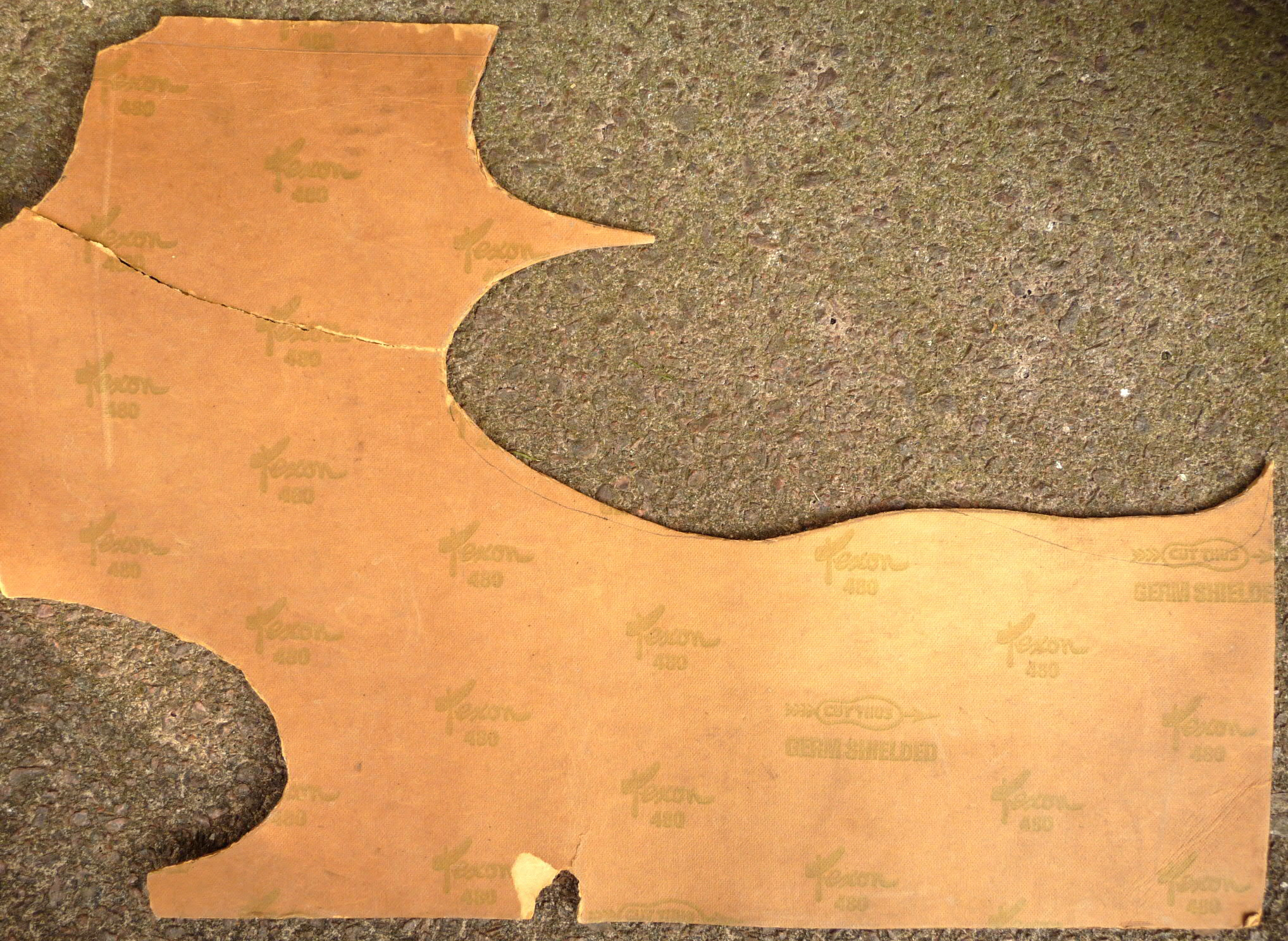
Vintage Texon 480 insole board offcut showing direction of cut-outs where shoe insole patterns have been placed

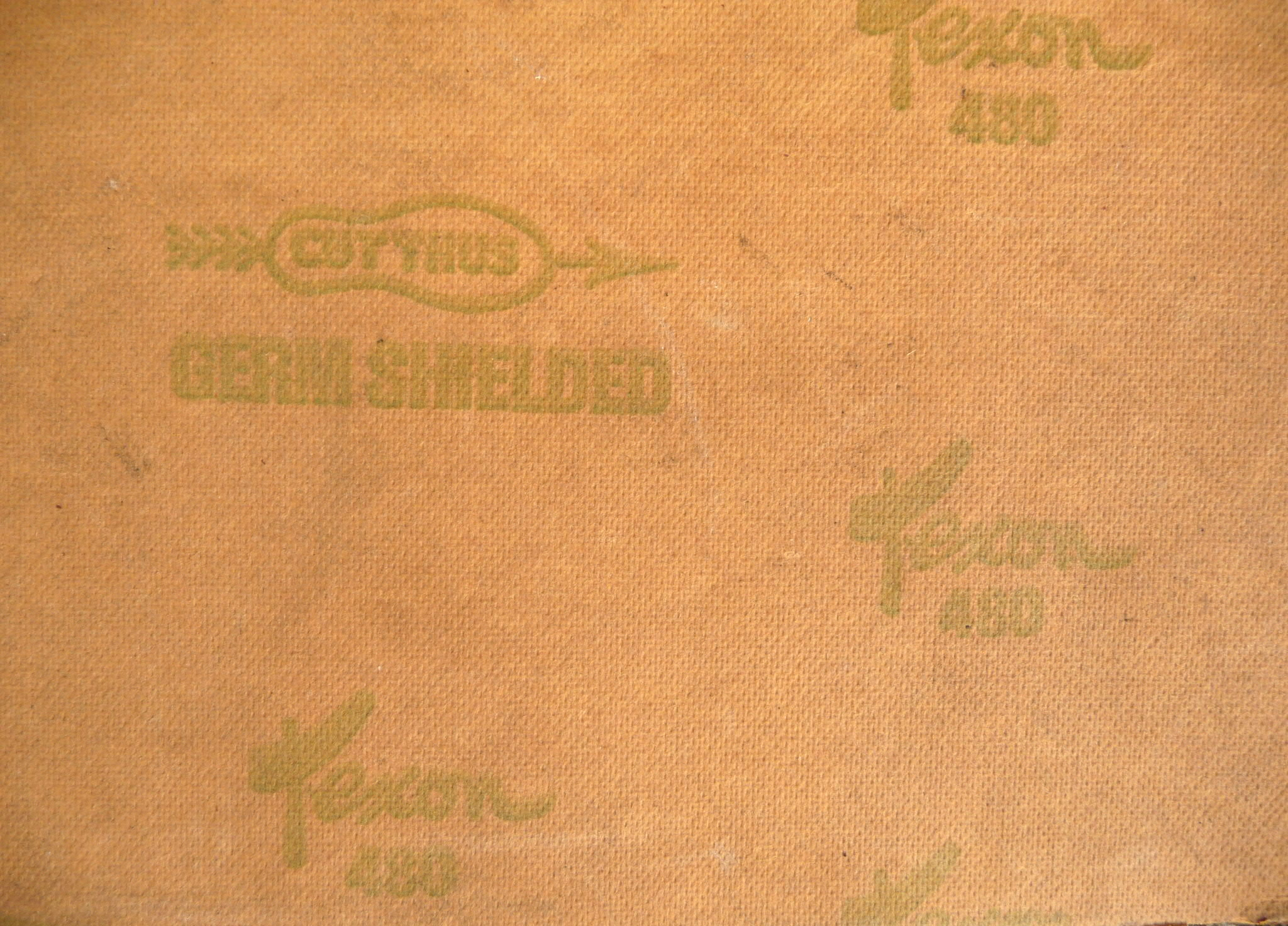
Close-up of Texon 480 insole board with direction of cut marked as Cut Thus by manufacturer showing direction where shoe insole patterns should be placed. The board is formulated to have different properties along its length compared to across, to allow for shoe-flex and manufacturing processes
