= Wally Lathlain =

Australian rules footballer, born 1905

Personal information
- Full name: Walter Frederick Lathlain
- Born: 2 December 1905; Werribee, Victoria
- Died: 13 December 1971 (aged 66); Surrey Hills, Victoria
- Original team: Camberwell
- Height: 169 cm (5 ft 7 in)
- Weight: 71 kg (157 lb)

Playing career^{1}
Years	Club	Games (Goals)
1928–30	Hawthorn	17 (0)
- ^{1} Playing statistics correct to the end of 1930.

Walter Frederick Lathlain (2 December 1905 – 13 December 1971) was an Australian rules footballer who played with Hawthorn in the Victorian Football League (VFL).
