= Geoff Brokenshire =

Australian rules footballer

Personal information
- Full name: Geoffrey Richard Brokenshire
- Born: 15 July 1922; Brighton, Victoria
- Died: 28 April 1986 (aged 63)
- Original team: Sandringham (VFA)
- Height: 183 cm (6 ft 0 in)
- Weight: 86 kg (190 lb)

Playing career^{1}
Years	Club	Games (Goals)
1948	Collingwood	13 (19)
1949–1950	Carlton	21 (18)
Total		34 (37)
- ^{1} Playing statistics correct to the end of 1950.

Geoffrey Richard Brokenshire (15 July 1922 – 28 April 1986) was an Australian rules footballer in the Victorian Football League (VFL). The Brokenshire family is of Cornish descent.

== Personal life ==
Brokenshire served as a flight lieutenant in the Royal Australian Air Force during the Second World War.
