= Jim Bohan =

Australian rules footballer, born 1919

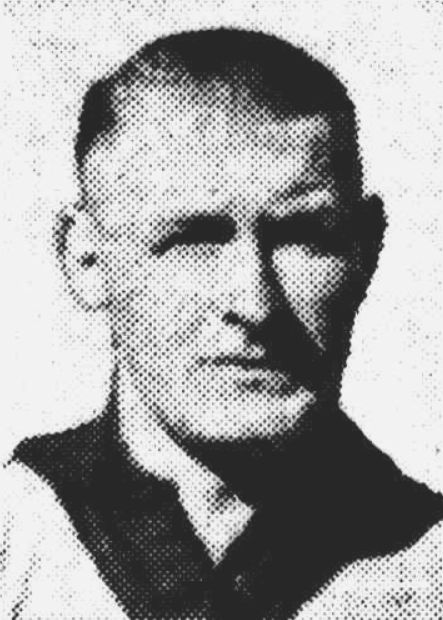

Personal information
- Full name: James Joseph Vincent Bohan
- Born: 21 July 1919; Hawthorn, Victoria
- Died: 13 October 1967 (aged 48); Fitzroy, Victoria
- Original team: Hawthorn CYMS (CYMSFA)
- Height: 179 cm (5 ft 10 in)
- Weight: 78 kg (172 lb)

Playing career^{1}
Years	Club	Games (Goals)
1938–1946	Hawthorn	131 (145)
1947-1953	Camberwell	136 (220)
Total		267 (365)
- ^{1} Playing statistics correct to the end of 1946.

Career highlights
- Hawthorn captain: 1944, 1946; 2× Hawthorn best and fairest: 1943, 1945; 3× Camberwell Best & Fairest: 1951, 52 & 53

James Joseph Vincent Bohan (21 July 1919 – 13 October 1967) was a former Australian rules footballer who played with Hawthorn in the VFL. He played in the centre or at centre half forward.

Bohan captained Hawthorn in 1944 and 1946 and despite playing with the club for almost a decade, he never once appeared in a finals match. He won Hawthorn's 'Best and Fairest' award in 1943 and 1945.

In a match against the Albury and Border Football Association representative side "Vehicle Park" in Albury in September 1945, Bohun kicked 20 goals.

He then left the club without a clearance in 1947 to join VFA side Camberwell, which was then playing under throw-pass rules, where he went on to play 140 games and won their best and fairest award in 1951, 1952 and 1953.

In 2003 he was named as centreman in Hawthorn's official Team of the Century, and as full back in Camberwell's Team of the Century.
