= Jack Vale (Australian footballer) =

Australian rules footballer, born 1905

Personal information
- Full name: John James Vale
- Born: 27 April 1905
- Died: 12 April 1970 (aged 64)
- Original team: Carlton Juniors
- Positions: Half-forward flank, ruck

Playing career^{1}
Years	Club	Games (Goals)
1925	Carlton	2 (0)
1928–1929	Fitzroy	29 (1)
Total		31 (1)
- ^{1} Playing statistics correct to the end of 1929.

Jack Vale (27 April 1905 – 12 April 1970) was an Australian rules footballer who played with Carlton and Fitzroy in the Victorian Football League (VFL).
