= Barney Jorgensen =

Australian rules footballer

Personal information
- Full name: Rex Arthur Jorgensen
- Born: 12 July 1922
- Died: 28 October 2001 (aged 79)
- Original team: Mildura
- Height: 177 cm (5 ft 10 in)
- Weight: 82 kg (181 lb)

Playing career^{1}
Years	Club	Games (Goals)
1941	Camberwell (VFA)	10 (21)
1942	Hawthorn	4 (3)
1943	St Kilda	4 (1)
1945	Camberwell (VFA)	21 (13)
- ^{1} Playing statistics correct to the end of 1945.

Rex Arthur "Barney" Jorgensen (12 July 1922 – 28 October 2001) was an Australian rules footballer who played for the Hawthorn Football Club and St Kilda Football Club in the Victorian Football League (VFL).
