= Lyall Williams =

Australian rules footballer, born 1906

Personal information
- Full name: Edwin Lyall Williams
- Born: 18 June 1906; Kaniva, Victoria
- Died: 2 October 1994 (aged 88); Murrumbeena, Victoria
- Original team: Camberwell (VFA)/ Ballarat
- Height: 174 cm (5 ft 9 in)
- Weight: 81 kg (179 lb)

Playing career^{1}
Years	Club	Games (Goals)
1929–30	Hawthorn	24 (0)
- ^{1} Playing statistics correct to the end of 1930.

Edwin Lyall Williams (18 June 1906 – 2 October 1994) was a prominent Churches of Christ minister in Victoria and an Australian rules footballer who played with Hawthorn in the Victorian Football League (VFL).

== Early life ==
The son of Arthur James Williams (1864–1935) and Annie Maria Williams, nee Petchell (1864–1928), Edwin Lyall Williams was born in Kaniva on 18 June 1906.

After attending Sandsmere State School and then Nhill Higher Elementary School, Williams moved with his family to Ballarat in the early 1920s.

== Football ==
Williams commenced his football career in Ballarat in 1923 before joining Victorian Football Association (VFA) club Camberwell in 1928. In 1929 he joined Hawthorn for two seasons before returning to Camberwell, playing until the end of the 1934 season.

== Church ==
Ordained as a minister with the Church of Christ in 1928, Williams moved from a parish in Boronia to the Glenferrie Church of Christ in 1929. A popular minister, he had the education and gift of expression to speak with depth and subtlety about big issues. In 1936 Williams accepted a call to the ministry of the Church of Christ at Ponsonby Road in Auckland, New Zealand. He returned to Australia to serve as Principal of the Church of Christ national college from 1945 to 1973.

== Family ==
Edwin Lyall Williams married Bertha Lila Brown (1910–1996) on 25 January 1930 and they had two sons and a daughter together.

Williams died at Murrumbeena on 2 October 1994.
