= Terry Mountain =

Australian rules footballer

Personal information
- Full name: Terry Mountain
- Born: July 7, 1935 (age 91)
- Original team: Lincoln Stars
- Height: 191 cm (6 ft 3 in)
- Weight: 85 kg (187 lb)

Playing career^{1}
Years	Club	Games (Goals)
1957	Melbourne	3 (1)
1958	Geelong	2 (0)
1965	Edithvale Aspendale	unknown
Total		5 (1)
- ^{1} Playing statistics correct to the end of 1958.

Terry Mountain (born 7 July 1935) is a former Australian rules footballer who played with Melbourne and Geelong in the Victorian Football League (VFL). Terry was a member of Edithvale Aspendale Football Club senior premiership team in 1965 and was President of Sorrento Football Club for one season in 1998.
