= Harry Weatherill =

Australian rules footballer

Personal information
- Full name: Henry Francis Weatherill
- Born: 7 October 1893; Hawthorn, Victoria
- Died: 6 July 1960 (aged 66); Parkville, Victoria
- Original team: Camberwell
- Height: 185 cm (6 ft 1 in)
- Weight: 86 kg (190 lb)

Playing career^{1}
Years	Club	Games (Goals)
1919	Richmond	6 (0)
- ^{1} Playing statistics correct to the end of 1919.

Henry Francis Weatherill (7 October 1893 – 6 July 1960) was an Australian rules footballer who played with Richmond in the Victorian Football League (VFL).
