= Len Wallace =

Australian rules footballer, born 1909

Personal information
- Full name: Len Wallace
- Born: 9 January 1909
- Died: 22 June 1973 (aged 64)
- Original team: Camberwell
- Height: 180 cm (5 ft 11 in)
- Weight: 64 kg (141 lb)
- Position: Utility

Playing career^{1}
Years	Club	Games (Goals)
1934–38	Essendon	61 (7)
- ^{1} Playing statistics correct to the end of 1938.

Len Wallace (9 January 1909 – 22 June 1973) was a former Australian rules footballer who played with Essendon in the Victorian Football League (VFL).
