= Ken Ross (footballer) =

Australian rules footballer

Personal information
- Full name: Kenneth Douglas Ross
- Born: 27 August 1927
- Died: 19 September 2004 (aged 77); Melbourne
- Original team: Northcote
- Height: 188 cm (6 ft 2 in)
- Weight: 87 kg (192 lb)
- Position: Utility

Playing career^{1}
Years	Club	Games (Goals)
1948–55, 1959–60	Fitzroy	129 (36)
- ^{1} Playing statistics correct to the end of 1960.

Kenneth Douglas Ross (27 August 1927 – 19 September 2004) was an Australian rules footballer who played for Fitzroy in the Victorian Football League (VFL).

Ross was a versatile footballer, used often as a ruck-rover, whom Fitzroy recruited from VFA club Northcote. He spent eight seasons at Fitzroy, before returning to the VFA in 1956 where he was signed by Camberwell as playing coach. In 1957 he won the J. J. Liston Trophy and two years later made a comeback with Fitzroy. He appeared in all 18 games that the club played in the 1959 VFL season but retired after two games early the following year.
