= Horrie Mason =

Australian rules footballer (1903–1975)

Personal information
- Full name: Angus Thomas Mason
- Born: 30 April 1903; Hobart, Tasmania
- Died: 23 August 1975 (aged 72); South Melbourne, Victoria
- Original team: North Hobart (TFL)
- Height: 177 cm (5 ft 10 in)
- Weight: 80 kg (176 lb)

Playing career^{1}
Years	Club	Games (Goals)
1922–1931	St Kilda	137 (76)
- ^{1} Playing statistics correct to the end of 1931.

Angus Thomas 'Horrie' Mason (30 April 1903 – 23 August 1975) was an Australian rules footballer who played with St Kilda in the Victorian Football League (VFL) during the 1920s.

Originally from Tasmania where he had been a premiership player with North Hobart Football Club, Mason debuted for St Kilda in the 1922 VFL season. He was a wingman but towards the end of his career was used as a ruckman. In 1926 Mason tied with Harold Matthews for St Kilda's Best Player award and represented Victoria at interstate football for the first of six times.

After leaving St Kilda Mason played with Camberwell Football Club in the Victorian Football Association (VFA), which had just finished in last place in the VFA, as captain-coach. His arrival sparked the emergence of the Tricolours as a VFA force for the first time, but a runner-up spot to Yarraville in 1935 was the closest they could get to a flag. Mason was playing coach of Camberwell 1932 and 1933.

Mason was appointed as coach of the Kyneton Football Club in 1934, but resigned after eight games.

Mason then returned to Camberwell and took over as captain–coach of Camberwell for the remainder of 1934 and also stayed on as coach in 1935–36.

Camberwell's longest-serving coach. He was later named coach of the Camberwell Team of the Century.

Mason later served in the Royal Australian Navy during World War II.
