= 1950 Hawthorn Football Club season =

26th season in the Victorian Football League

Hawthorn Football Club
1950 season
- President: Dave Prentice
- Coach: Bob McCaskill
- Captains: Peter O'Donohue; Keivin Curran
- Home ground: Glenferrie Oval
- VFL Season: 0–18 (12th)
- Finals Series: Did not qualify
- Best and Fairest: John Kennedy Sr.
- Leading goalkicker: Gordon Anderson (21)
- Highest home attendance: 14,000 (Round 8 vs. Richmond)
- Lowest home attendance: 6,500 (Round 17 vs. South Melbourne)
- Average home attendance: 9,167

The 1950 season was the Hawthorn Football Club's 26th season in the Victorian Football League and 49th overall.

== Fixture ==
=== Premiership Season ===
Rd	Date and local time	Opponent	Scores (Hawthorn's scores indicated in bold)			Venue	Attendance	Record
Rd	Date and local time	Opponent	Home	Away	Result	Venue	Attendance	Record
1	Saturday, 22 April (2:15 pm)	Geelong	**4.15 (39)**	18.11 (119)	Lost by 80 points	Glenferrie Oval (H)	10,000	0–1
2	Saturday, 29 April (2:15 pm)	St Kilda	20.24 (144)	**5.5 (35)**	Lost by 109 points	Junction Oval (A)	10,000	0–2
3	Saturday, 6 May (2:15 pm)	Footscray	13.24 (102)	**4.9 (33)**	Lost by 69 points	Western Oval (A)	10,000	0–3
4	Saturday, 13 May (2:15 pm)	Collingwood	**6.12 (48)**	7.25 (67)	Lost by 19 points	Glenferrie Oval (H)	9,000	0–4
5	Saturday, 20 May (2:15 pm)	Fitzroy	19.15 (119)	**4.24 (48)**	Lost by 81 points	Brunswick Street Oval (A)	8,500	0–5
6	Saturday, 27 May (2:15 pm)	South Melbourne	20.14 (134)	**10.14 (74)**	Lost by 60 points	Lake Oval (A)	9,500	0–6
7	Saturday, 3 June (2:15 pm)	Melbourne	**6.12 (48)**	14.12 (96)	Lost by 48 points	Glenferrie Oval (H)	8,000	0–7
8	Saturday, 10 June (2:15 pm)	Richmond	**9.7 (61)**	14.9 (93)	Lost by 32 points	Glenferrie Oval (H)	14,000	0–8
9	Saturday, 17 June (2:15 pm)	Essendon	22.15 (147)	**9.7 (61)**	Lost by 86 points	Glenferrie Oval (H)	10,000	0–9
10	Saturday, 24 June (2:15 pm)	Carlton	**16.15 (111)**	16.20 (116)	Lost by 5 points	Glenferrie Oval (H)	10,000	0–10
11	Saturday, 1 July (2:15 pm)	North Melbourne	14.16 (100)	**2.13 (25)**	Lost by 75 points	Arden Street Oval (A)	10,000	0–11
12	Saturday, 8 July (2:15 pm)	Geelong	16.15 (111)	**4.12 (36)**	Lost by 75 points	Kardinia Park (A)	13,000	0–12
13	Saturday, 15 July (2:15 pm)	St Kilda	**10.11 (71)**	12.12 (84)	Lost by 13 points	Glenferrie Oval (H)	9,000	0–13
14	Saturday, 29 July (2:15 pm)	Footscray	**11.12 (78)**	11.14 (80)	Lost by 2 points	Glenferrie Oval (H)	9,000	0–14
15	Saturday, 5 August (2:15 pm)	Collingwood	16.21 (117)	**2.8 (20)**	Lost by 97 points	Victoria Park (A)	9,000	0–15
16	Saturday 12 August (2:15 pm)	Fitzroy	**11.14 (80)**	23.16 (154)	Lost by 74 points	Glenferrie Oval (H)	7,000	0–16
17	Saturday, 19 August (2:15 pm)	South Melbourne	**14.10 (94)**	16.7 (103)	Lost by 9 points	Glenferrie Oval (H)	6,500	0–17
18	Saturday, 26 August (2:15 pm)	Melbourne	23.18 (156)	**9.6 (60)**	Lost by 96 points	Melbourne Cricket Ground (A)	10,255	0–18

== Ladder ==
(P)	Premiers
	Qualified for finals

#	Team	P	W	L	D	PF	PA	%	Pts
1	Essendon (P)	18	17	1	0	1942	1197	162.2	68
2	North Melbourne	18	13	5	0	1595	1293	123.4	52
3	Melbourne	18	12	6	0	1485	1205	123.2	48
4	Geelong	18	10	8	0	1562	1256	124.4	40
5	Fitzroy	18	10	8	0	1452	1314	110.5	40
6	Richmond	18	10	8	0	1506	1476	102.0	40
7	Collingwood	18	9	9	0	1586	1437	110.4	36
8	Carlton	18	8	9	1	1528	1637	93.3	34
9	St Kilda	18	8	9	1	1341	1553	86.3	34
10	Footscray	18	5	13	0	1475	1608	91.7	20
11	South Melbourne	18	5	13	0	1438	1904	75.5	20
12	Hawthorn	18	0	18	0	1022	2052	49.8	0

Rules for classification: 1. premiership points; 2. percentage; 3. points for
Average score: 83.0
Source: AFL Tables
