= Albiston =

Albiston is a surname. Notable people with the surname include:

- Alec Albiston (1917–1998), Australian rules footballer
- Arthur Albiston (born 1957), Scottish footballer
- David Albiston (born 1944), Australian rules footballer
- Harold Albiston (1916–1990), Australian rules footballer
- Jordie Albiston (1961–2022), Australian poet and academic
- Ken Albiston (1926–2018), Australian rules footballer
- Mark Albiston (born 1972), New Zealand film and television director
- Wendy Albiston (born 1969), Welsh actress
