= 1949 Hawthorn Football Club season =

25th season in the Victorian Football League

Hawthorn Football Club
1949 season
- President: Dr. Jacob Jona
- Coach: Alec Albiston
- Captain: Alec Albiston
- Home ground: Glenferrie Oval
- VFL Season: 3–16 (12th)
- Finals Series: Did not qualify
- Best and Fairest: Col Austen
- Leading goalkicker: Albert Prior (48)
- Highest home attendance: 13,000 (Round 2 vs. Richmond)
- Lowest home attendance: 7,000 (Round 12 vs. Essendon)
- Average home attendance: 9,556

The 1949 season was the Hawthorn Football Club's 25th season in the Victorian Football League and 48th overall.

== Fixture ==
=== Premiership Season ===
Rd	Date and local time	Opponent	Scores (Hawthorn's scores indicated in bold)			Venue	Attendance	Record
Rd	Date and local time	Opponent	Home	Away	Result	Venue	Attendance	Record
1	Saturday, 16 April (2:15 pm)	Essendon	18.12 (120)	**9.3 (57)**	Lost by 63 points	Windy Hill (A)	13,500	0–1
2	Saturday, 23 April (2:15 pm)	Richmond	**5.13 (43)**	20.12 (132)	Lost by 89 points	Glenferrie Oval (H)	13,000	0–2
3	Saturday, 30 April (2:15 pm)	Carlton	21.27 (153)	**7.6 (48)**	Lost by 105 points	Princes Park (A)	9,250	0–3
4	Saturday, 7 May (2:15 pm)	Collingwood	**5.10 (40)**	9.11 (65)	Lost by 25 points	Glenferrie Oval (H)	11,500	0–4
5	Saturday, 14 May (2:15 pm)	Fitzroy	**9.13 (67)**	14.21 (105)	Lost by 38 points	Glenferrie Oval (H)	7,500	0–5
6	Saturday, 21 May (2:15 pm)	North Melbourne	13.23 (101)	**12.7 (79)**	Lost by 22 points	Arden Street Oval (A)	9,000	0–6
7	Saturday, 28 May (2:15 pm)	South Melbourne	**6.12 (48)**	12.15 (87)	Lost by 39 points	Glenferrie Oval (H)	10,000	0–7
8	Saturday, 4 June (2:15 pm)	Melbourne	10.17 (77)	**10.6 (66)**	Lost by 11 points	Melbourne Cricket Ground (A)	10,779	0–8
9	Saturday, 11 June (2:15 pm)	Footscray	**10.13 (73)**	8.15 (63)	Won by 10 points	Glenferrie Oval (H)	10,000	1–8
10	Saturday, 18 June (2:15 pm)	Geelong	20.12 (132)	**6.10 (46)**	Lost by 86 points	Kardinia Park (A)	12,000	1–9
11	Saturday, 2 July (2:15 pm)	St Kilda	13.11 (89)	**14.13 (97)**	Won by 8 points	Junction Oval (A)	7,000	2–9
12	Saturday, 9 July (2:15 pm)	Essendon	**7.0 (42)**	16.16 (112)	Lost by 70 points	Glenferrie Oval (H)	7,000	2–10
13	Saturday, 16 July (2:15 pm)	Richmond	16.21 (117)	**9.13 (67)**	Lost by 50 points	Punt Road Oval (A)	7,000	2–11
14	Saturday, 23 July (2:15 pm)	Carlton	**8.5 (53)**	9.17 (71)	Lost by 18 points	Glenferrie Oval (H)	9,000	2–12
15	Saturday, 30 July (2:15 pm)	Collingwood	16.23 (119)	**5.6 (36)**	Lost by 83 points	Victoria Park (A)	9,500	2–13
16	Saturday, 6 August (2:15 pm)	Fitzroy	10.19 (79)	**8.17 (65)**	Lost by 14 points	Brunswick Street Oval (A)	4,000	2–14
17	Saturday, 13 August (2:15 pm)	North Melbourne	**13.10 (88)**	9.16 (70)	Won by 18 points	Glenferrie Oval (H)	9,000	3–14
18	Saturday, 20 August (2:15 pm)	South Melbourne	14.8 (92)	**8.14 (62)**	Lost by 30 points	Lake Oval (A)	4,000	3–15
19	Saturday, 27 August (2:15 pm)	Melbourne	**10.16 (76)**	15.12 (102)	Lost by 26 points	Glenferrie Oval (H)	9,000	3–16

== Ladder ==
(P)	Premiers
	Qualified for finals

#	Team	P	W	L	D	PF	PA	%	Pts
1	North Melbourne	19	14	5	0	1471	1235	119.1	56
2	Carlton	19	13	6	0	1679	1328	126.4	52
3	Collingwood	19	13	6	0	1616	1308	123.5	52
4	Essendon (P)	19	13	6	0	1649	1366	120.7	52
5	Melbourne	19	12	7	0	1516	1341	113.0	48
6	Richmond	19	10	9	0	1733	1485	116.7	40
7	Fitzroy	19	10	9	0	1488	1521	97.8	40
8	Geelong	19	9	10	0	1722	1540	111.8	36
9	Footscray	19	7	12	0	1211	1444	83.9	28
10	South Melbourne	19	6	13	0	1343	1669	80.5	24
11	St Kilda	19	4	15	0	1272	1730	73.5	16
12	Hawthorn	19	3	16	0	1153	1886	61.1	12

Rules for classification: 1. premiership points; 2. percentage; 3. points for
Average score: 78.3
Source: AFL Tables
