= 1948 Hawthorn Football Club season =

24th season in the Victorian Football League

Hawthorn Football Club
1948 season
- President: Dr. Jacob Jona
- Coach: Alec Albiston
- Captain: Alec Albiston
- Home ground: Glenferrie Oval
- VFL Season: 5–14 (11th)
- Finals Series: Did not qualify
- Best and Fairest: Kevin Curran
- Leading goalkicker: Albert Prior (47)
- Highest home attendance: 18,000 (Round 9 vs. Collingwood)
- Lowest home attendance: 5,000 (Round 19 vs. St Kilda)
- Average home attendance: 11,110

The 1948 season was the Hawthorn Football Club's 24th season in the Victorian Football League and 47th overall.

== Fixture ==
=== Premiership Season ===
Rd	Date and local time	Opponent	Scores (Hawthorn's scores indicated in bold)			Venue	Attendance	Record
Rd	Date and local time	Opponent	Home	Away	Result	Venue	Attendance	Record
1	Saturday, 17 April (2:15 pm)	Carlton	**11.10 (76)**	17.15 (117)	Lost by 41 points	Glenferrie Oval (H)	16,000	0–1
2	Saturday, 26 April (2:15 pm)	Essendon	11.16 (82)	**8.11 (59)**	Lost by 23 points	Windy Hill (A)	16,000	0–2
3	Saturday, 1 May (2:15 pm)	Footscray	12.12 (84)	**6.9 (45)**	Lost by 39 points	Western Oval (A)	13,000	0–3
4	Saturday, 8 May (2:15 pm)	North Melbourne	**14.21 (105)**	11.15 (81)	Won by 24 points	Glenferrie Oval (H)	9,000	1–3
5	Saturday, 15 May (2:15 pm)	Fitzroy	15.19 (109)	**6.11 (47)**	Lost by 62 points	Brunswick Street Oval (A)	8,500	1–4
6	Saturday, 22 May (2:15 pm)	Geelong	**17.10 (112)**	12.3 (75)	Won by 37 points	Glenferrie Oval (H)	9,500	2–4
7	Saturday, 29 May (2:15 pm)	Richmond	**9.11 (65)**	12.14 (86)	Lost by 21 points	Glenferrie Oval (H)	17,000	2–5
8	Saturday, 5 June (2:15 pm)	St Kilda	7.12 (54)	**10.12 (72)**	Won by 18 points	Junction Oval (A)	7,000	3–5
9	Saturday, 12 June (2:15 pm)	Collingwood	**8.8 (56)**	12.17 (99)	Lost by 43 points	Glenferrie Oval (H)	18,000	3–6
10	Saturday, 19 June (2:15 pm)	Melbourne	18.12 (120)	**11.13 (79)**	Lost by 41 points	Melbourne Cricket Ground (A)	12,157	3–7
11	Saturday, 3 July (2:15 pm)	South Melbourne	**9.7 (61)**	12.15 (87)	Lost by 26 points	Glenferrie Oval (H)	8,000	3–8
12	Saturday, 10 July (2:15 pm)	Carlton	17.10 (112)	**10.9 (69)**	Lost by 43 points	Princes Park (A)	9,000	3–9
13	Saturday, 17 July (2:15 pm)	Essendon	**9.12 (66)**	18.14 (122)	Lost by 56 points	Glenferrie Oval (H)	12,000	3–10
14	Saturday, 24 July (2:15 pm)	Footscray	**11.7 (73)**	11.12 (78)	Lost by 5 points	Glenferrie Oval (H)	8,000	3–11
15	Saturday, 31 July (2:15 pm)	North Melbourne	11.18 (84)	**8.9 (57)**	Lost by 27 points	Arden Street Oval (A)	9,000	3–12
16	Saturday, 14 August (2:15 pm)	Fitzroy	**6.7 (43)**	4.16 (40)	Won by 3 points	Glenferrie Oval (H)	8,500	4–12
17	Saturday, 21 August (2:15 pm)	Geelong	11.14 (80)	**11.15 (81)**	Won by 1 point	Kardinia Park (A)	10,000	5–12
18	Saturday, 28 August (2:15 pm)	Richmond	17.11 (113)	**9.6 (60)**	Lost by 53 points	Punt Road Oval (A)	16,000	5–13
19	Saturday, 4 September (2:15 pm)	St Kilda	**7.12 (54)**	9.13 (67)	Lost by 13 points	Glenferrie Oval (H)	5,000	5–14

== Ladder ==
(P)	Premiers
	Qualified for finals

#	Team	P	W	L	D	PF	PA	%	Pts
1	Essendon	19	16	2	1	1838	1340	137.2	66
2	Melbourne (P)	19	13	6	0	1682	1347	124.9	52
3	Collingwood	19	13	6	0	1775	1500	118.3	52
4	Footscray	19	12	7	0	1499	1453	103.2	48
5	Richmond	19	11	7	1	1895	1509	125.6	46
6	Carlton	19	10	9	0	1768	1564	113.0	40
7	Fitzroy	19	9	10	0	1529	1355	112.8	36
8	North Melbourne	19	8	11	0	1328	1589	83.6	32
9	Geelong	19	7	12	0	1558	1737	89.7	28
10	South Melbourne	19	7	12	0	1512	1826	82.8	28
11	Hawthorn	19	5	14	0	1280	1690	75.7	20
12	St Kilda	19	2	17	0	1124	1878	59.9	8

Rules for classification: 1. premiership points; 2. percentage; 3. points for
Average score: 82.4
Source: AFL Tables
