= Condon (surname) =

Condon (Irish Condún) is a surname that originated in Ireland, and now most common in counties Cork, Limerick and Tipperary.

== History ==
The name appears early records as "de Caunteton" or "Caunton," derivative of Canton in Glamorgan where a Jordan de Caunteton was tenant of the Fitzgeralds. A Nicholas de Caunteton married Mabilia, sister of Raymond "Le Gros" FitzGerald. When Le Gros died without male issue, his Caunteton nephews inherited his lands in Glascarrig (Co. Wexford) and Glanworth and Kilworth (Co. Cork).

Robert de Caunton took part in the rebellion against the Crown of Maurice FitzGerald, 1st Earl of Desmond and was outlawed in 1344. Patrick Condon of Cloghleigh took part in both Desmond Rebellions, sacking Youghal in January 1583 where he flew the Papal flag. In 1586, his lands were seized and granted to Arthur Hyde.

Dispossessed by the Cromwellian plantations, the family produced notable poets including Dáibhidh Cúndún (author of "Aiste Dáibhí Cúndún") and Pádraig Phiarais Cúndún (author of "Tórramh an Bharaille").

== List of people surnamed Condon ==
- Alex Condon (born 2004), Australian men's basketball player
- Ann Gorman Condon (1936–2001), American-born Canadian historian
- Anne Condon (fl. 1982), Irish-Canadian computer scientist
- Chris Condon (1923–2010), American 3D cinematographer
- Colm Condon (1921–2008), Irish barrister and former Attorney General of Ireland
- Davy Condon (born 1984/85), Irish National Hunt jockey
- Eddie Condon (1905–1973), American jazz musician
- Edward Condon (1902–1974), American nuclear physicist
- Francis Condon (1891–1965), American judge and politician
- Herbert Thomas Condon (1912–1978), Australian ornithologist and museum curator
- John Condon (disambiguation), several people
- Joseph Lawrence Condon (1933–1991), Canadian Member of Parliament
- Kerry Condon (born 1983), Irish actress
- Mike Condon (born 1990), American former professional ice hockey goaltender
- Paul Condon, Baron Condon (born 1947), British former Commissioner of Police of the Metropolis
- Richard Condon (disambiguation), several people
- Thomas Condon (1822–1907), Irish-American minister, geologist, and paleontologist
- Thomas Condon (politician) (1883–1963), Irish politician
- Tom Condon (born 1952), American sports agent and former American football player
- Tom Condon (hurler) (born 1987), Irish hurler
- William Condon (disambiguation), several people
- Zach Condon (born 1986), American musician and head of Beirut (band)
