= 1974 Hawthorn Football Club season =

50th season in the Victorian Football League

Hawthorn Football Club
1974 season
- President: Phil J. Ryan
- Coach: John Kennedy, Sr.
- Captain: Peter Crimmins
- Home ground: Princes Park
- VFL season: 15–7 (3rd)
- Finals series: Preliminary Final (lost to North Melbourne 51–56)
- Best and Fairest: Leigh Matthews
- Leading goalkicker: Michael Moncrieff (67)
- Highest home attendance: 84,846 (Semi-final vs. Collingwood)
- Lowest home attendance: 6,418 (Round 17 vs. Fitzroy)
- Average home attendance: 22,641

The 1974 season was the Hawthorn Football Club's 50th season in the Victorian Football League and 73rd overall. Hawthorn qualified for finals for the first time since 1971, where they were defeated by North Melbourne in the Preliminary final 51–56.

== Fixture ==
=== Premiership season ===
Rd	Date and local time	Opponent	Scores (Hawthorn's scores indicated in bold)			Venue	Attendance	Record
Rd	Date and local time	Opponent	Home	Away	Result	Venue	Attendance	Record
1	Saturday, 6 April (2:10 pm)	Richmond	12.16 (88)	**15.14 (104)**	Won by 16 points	Melbourne Cricket Ground (A)	38,734	1–0
2	Saturday, 13 April (2:10 pm)	Collingwood	**6.12 (48)**	10.11 (71)	Lost by 23 points	Princes Park (H)	30,216	1–1
3	Saturday, 20 April (2:10 pm)	South Melbourne	8.18 (66)	**20.15 (135)**	Won by 69 points	Lake Oval (A)	11,828	2–1
4	Saturday, 27 April (2:10 pm)	Essendon	**9.15 (69)**	5.13 (43)	Won by 26 points	Princes Park (H)	17,598	3–1
5	Saturday, 4 May (2:10 pm)	Footscray	**8.14 (62)**	11.19 (85)	Lost by 23 points	VFL Park (H)	20,275	3–2
6	Saturday, 11 May (2:10 pm)	Fitzroy	18.16 (124)	**13.16 (94)**	Lost by 30 points	Junction Oval (A)	10,588	3–3
7	Saturday, 18 May (2:10 pm)	Carlton	**13.22 (100)**	8.12 (60)	Won by 40 points	Princes Park (H)	21,266	4–3
8	Saturday, 25 May (2:10 pm)	Melbourne	6.15 (51)	**13.21 (99)**	Won by 48 points	Melbourne Cricket Ground (A)	18,030	5–3
9	Saturday, 1 June (2:10 pm)	St Kilda	**18.15 (123)**	10.16 (76)	Won by 47 points	Princes Park Football Ground (H)	12,631	6–3
10	Saturday, 8 June (2:10 pm)	Geelong	**14.13 (97)**	10.6 (66)	Won by 31 points	VFL Park (H)	18,562	7–3
11	Monday, 17 June (2:10 pm)	North Melbourne	14.11 (95)	**9.21 (75)**	Lost by 20 points	Arden Street Oval (A)	17,368	7–4
12	Saturday, 22 June (2:10 pm)	Richmond	**19.17 (131)**	15.18 (108)	Won by 23 points	Princes Park (H)	15,648	8–4
13	Saturday, 29 June (2:10 pm)	Collingwood	13.18 (96)	**13.12 (90)**	Lost by 6 points	Victoria Park (A)	26,028	8–5
14	Saturday, 6 July (2:10 pm)	Essendon	11.9 (75)	**23.17 (155)**	Won by 80 points	Windy Hill (A)	16,493	9–5
15	Saturday, 13 July (2:10 pm)	South Melbourne	**16.14 (110)**	4.7 (31)	Won by 79 points	Princes Park (H)	7,367	10–5
16	Saturday, 20 July (2:10 pm)	Footscray	8.12 (60)	**12.9 (81)**	Won by 21 points	Western Oval (A)	15,299	11–5
17	Saturday, 27 July (2:10 pm)	Fitzroy	**13.28 (106)**	8.10 (58)	Won by 48 points	Princes Park (H)	6,418	12–5
18	Saturday, 3 August (2:10 pm)	Carlton	14.12 (96)	**18.12 (120)**	Won by 24 points	Princes Park (A)	23,365	13–5
19	Saturday, 10 August (2:10 pm)	Melbourne	**17.20 (122)**	14.13 (97)	Won by 25 points	Princes Park (H)	8,754	14–5
20	Saturday, 17 August (2:10 pm)	St Kilda	11.9 (75)	**16.12 (108)**	Won by 33 points	VFL Park (A)	21,555	15–5
21	Saturday, 24 August (2:10 pm)	Geelong	15.12 (102)	**9.8 (62)**	Lost by 40 points	Kardinia Park (A)	17,834	15–6
22	Saturday, 31 August (2:10 pm)	North Melbourne	**10.17 (77)**	16.10 (106)	Lost by 29 points	Princes Park (H)	28,110	15–7

=== Finals Series ===
Rd	Date and local time	Opponent	Scores (Hawthorn's scores indicated in bold)			Venue	Attendance
Rd	Date and local time	Opponent	Home	Away	Result	Venue	Attendance
Qualifying final	Saturday, 7 September (2:30 pm)	North Melbourne	15.13 (103)	**8.17 (65)**	Lost by 38 points	Melbourne Cricket Ground (A)	77,519
First semi-final	Saturday, 14 September (2:30 pm)	Collingwood	**21.12 (138)**	13.10 (88)	Won by 50 points	Melbourne Cricket Ground (H)	84,846
Preliminary final	Saturday, 21 September (2:30 pm)	North Melbourne	8.8 (56)	**7.9 (51)**	Lost by 5 points	Melbourne Cricket Ground (A)	88,262

== Ladder ==
(P)	Premiers
	Qualified for finals

#	Team	P	W	L	D	PF	PA	%	Pts
1	Richmond (P)	22	17	5	0	2558	1979	129.3	68
2	North Melbourne	22	16	6	0	2398	1728	138.8	64
3	Hawthorn	22	15	7	0	2168	1729	125.4	60
4	Collingwood	22	15	7	0	2131	2037	104.6	60
5	Footscray	22	13	8	1	1899	1746	108.8	54
6	Geelong	22	11	11	0	1858	1989	93.4	44
7	Carlton	22	10	11	1	2053	1941	105.8	42
8	Essendon	22	10	12	0	2110	2162	97.6	40
9	South Melbourne	22	9	12	1	1947	2327	83.7	38
10	St Kilda	22	7	15	0	1790	2018	88.7	28
11	Fitzroy	22	4	17	1	1770	2481	71.3	18
12	Melbourne	22	3	19	0	1840	2385	77.1	12

Rules for classification: 1. premiership points; 2. percentage; 3. points for
Average score: 92.9
Source: AFL Tables
