= 1946 Hawthorn Football Club season =

22nd season in the Victorian Football League

Hawthorn Football Club
1946 season
- President: Dr. Jacob Jona
- Coach: Keith Shea
- Captain: Jim Bohan
- Home ground: Glenferrie Oval
- VFL Season: 3–16 (12th)
- Finals Series: Did not qualify
- Best and Fairest: Alec Albiston
- Leading goalkicker: Albert Prior (52)
- Highest home attendance: 19,000 (Round 1 vs. Collingwood)
- Lowest home attendance: 5,000 (Round 13 vs. Geelong)
- Average home attendance: 11,500

The 1946 season was the Hawthorn Football Club's 22nd season in the Victorian Football League and 45th overall.

== Fixture ==
=== Premiership Season ===
Rd	Date and local time	Opponent	Scores (Hawthorn's scores indicated in bold)			Venue	Attendance	Record
Rd	Date and local time	Opponent	Home	Away	Result	Venue	Attendance	Record
1	Monday, 22 April (2:45 pm)	Collingwood	**7.19 (61)**	18.16 (124)	Lost by 63 points	Glenferrie Oval (H)	19,000	0–1
2	Saturday, 27 April (2:45 pm)	Geelong	15.14 (104)	**9.19 (73)**	Lost by 31 points	Kardinia Park (A)	7,500	0–2
3	Saturday, 4 May (2:45 pm)	Carlton	**15.11 (101)**	19.17 (131)	Lost by 30 points	Glenferrie Oval (H)	16,000	0–3
4	Saturday, 11 May (2:45 pm)	Essendon	**8.6 (54)**	24.13 (157)	Lost by 103 points	Glenferrie Oval (H)	10,000	0–4
5	Saturday, 18 May (2:45 pm)	South Melbourne	11.21 (87)	**6.17 (53)**	Lost by 34 points	Junction Oval (A)	10,000	0–5
6	Saturday, 25 May (2:45 pm)	Melbourne	**16.10 (106)**	13.13 (91)	Won by 15 points	Glenferrie Oval (H)	8,000	1–5
7	Saturday, 1 June (2:30 pm)	Footscray	**13.12 (90)**	14.15 (99)	Lost by 9 points	Glenferrie Oval (H)	13,000	1–6
8	Saturday, 8 June (2:30 pm)	Fitzroy	14.14 (98)	**9.10 (64)**	Lost by 34 points	Brunswick Street Oval (A)	12,000	1–7
9	Monday, 17 June (2:30 pm)	North Melbourne	**17.20 (122)**	14.13 (97)	Won by 25 points	Glenferrie Oval (H)	14,000	2–7
10	Saturday, 22 June (2:30 pm)	St Kilda	10.24 (84)	**9.12 (66)**	Lost by 18 points	Junction Oval (A)	8,000	2–8
11	Saturday, 6 July (2:30 pm)	Richmond	**9.6 (60)**	14.14 (98)	Lost by 38 points	Glenferrie Oval (H)	11,000	2–9
12	Saturday, 13 July (2:30 pm)	Collingwood	15.23 (113)	**11.14 (80)**	Lost by 33 points	Victoria Park (A)	11,000	2–10
13	Saturday, 20 July (2:30 pm)	Geelong	**15.22 (112)**	11.15 (81)	Won by 31 points	Glenferrie Oval (H)	5,000	3–10
14	Saturday, 27 July (2:30 pm)	Carlton	15.18 (108)	**10.11 (71)**	Lost by 37 points	Princes Park (A)	17,000	3–11
15	Saturday, 3 August (2:45 pm)	Essendon	21.18 (144)	**12.7 (79)**	Lost by 65 points	Windy Hill (A)	12,000	3–12
16	Saturday, 10 August (2:45 pm)	South Melbourne	**12.15 (87)**	16.14 (110)	Lost by 23 points	Glenferrie Oval (H)	13,000	3–13
17	Saturday, 17 August (2:45 pm)	Melbourne	18.15 (123)	**13.8 (86)**	Lost by 37 points	Melbourne Cricket Ground (A)	15,601	3–14
18	Saturday, 24 August (2:45 pm)	Footscray	23.27 (165)	**8.5 (53)**	Lost by 112 points	Western Oval (A)	12,000	3–15
19	Saturday, 31 August (2:45 pm)	Fitzroy	**9.15 (69)**	12.22 (94)	Lost by 25 points	Glenferrie Oval (H)	6,000	3–16

== Ladder ==
(P)	Premiers
	Qualified for finals

#	Team	P	W	L	D	PF	PA	%	Pts
1	Essendon (P)	19	15	4	0	1980	1407	140.7	60
2	Collingwood	19	13	6	0	1849	1477	125.2	52
3	Footscray	19	13	6	0	1917	1628	117.8	52
4	Melbourne	19	13	6	0	1700	1622	104.8	52
5	Richmond	19	11	8	0	1921	1659	115.8	44
6	Carlton	19	11	8	0	1724	1688	102.1	44
7	South Melbourne	19	10	9	0	1627	1528	106.5	40
8	Fitzroy	19	9	10	0	1589	1339	118.7	36
9	North Melbourne	19	8	11	0	1536	1685	91.2	32
10	Geelong	19	4	15	0	1505	2124	70.9	16
11	St Kilda	19	4	15	0	1332	1902	70.0	16
12	Hawthorn	19	3	16	0	1487	2108	70.5	12

Rules for classification: 1. premiership points; 2. percentage; 3. points for
Average score: 88.5
Source: AFL Tables
