= 1947 Hawthorn Football Club season =

23rd season in the Victorian Football League

Hawthorn Football Club
1947 season
- President: Dr. Jacob Jona
- Coach: Alec Albiston
- Captain: Alec Albiston
- Home ground: Glenferrie Oval
- VFL Season: 4–15 (11th)
- Finals Series: Did not qualify
- Best and Fairest: Wally Culpitt
- Leading goalkicker: Albert Prior (67)
- Highest home attendance: 16,000 (Round 6 vs. Melbourne
- Lowest home attendance: 5,000 (Round 15 vs. St Kilda
- Average home attendance: 11,056

The 1947 season was the Hawthorn Football Club's 23rd season in the Victorian Football League and 46th overall.

== Fixture ==
=== Premiership Season ===
Rd	Date and local time	Opponent	Scores (Hawthorn's scores indicated in bold)			Venue	Attendance	Record
Rd	Date and local time	Opponent	Home	Away	Result	Venue	Attendance	Record
1	Saturday, 19 April (2:45 pm)	Geelong	19.15 (129)	**12.12 (84)**	Lost by 45 points	Kardinia Park (A)	13,000	0–1
2	Saturday, 26 April (2:45 pm)	Collingwood	**13.9 (87)**	19.20 (134)	Lost by 47 points	Glenferrie Oval (H)	15,000	0–2
3	Saturday, 3 May (2:45 pm)	Footscray	**12.10 (82)**	20.14 (134)	Lost by 52 points	Glenferrie Oval (H)	11,000	0–3
4	Saturday, 10 May (2:45 pm)	St Kilda	10.17 (77)	**12.12 (84)**	Won by 7 points	Junction Oval (A)	10,500	1–3
5	Saturday, 17 May (2:45 pm)	Richmond	**16.11 (107)**	10.9 (69)	Won by 38 points	Glenferrie Oval (H)	13,000	2–3
6	Saturday, 24 May (2:45 pm)	Melbourne	**9.12 (66)**	12.9 (81)	Lost by 15 points	Glenferrie Oval (H)	16,000	2–4
7	Saturday, 31 May (2:45 pm)	South Melbourne	15.14 (104)	**12.20 (92)**	Lost by 12 points	Lake Oval (A)	15,000	2–5
8	Saturday, 7 June (2:30 pm)	North Melbourne	**10.15 (75)**	10.11 (71)	Won by 4 points	Glenferrie Oval (H)	12,000	3–5
9	Saturday, 14 June (2:30 pm)	Fitzroy	16.15 (111)	**8.14 (62)**	Lost by 49 points	Brunswick Street Oval (A)	13,000	3–6
10	Saturday, 21 June (2:30 pm)	Essendon	**6.9 (45)**	18.20 (128)	Lost by 83 points	Glenferrie Oval (H)	14,000	3–7
11	Saturday, 28 June (2:30 pm)	Carlton	18.17 (125)	**8.14 (62)**	Lost by 63 points	Princes Park (A)	14,000	3–8
12	Saturday, 5 July (2:30 pm)	Geelong	**12.11 (83)**	16.21 (117)	Lost by 34 points	Glenferrie Oval (H)	5,500	3–9
13	Saturday, 12 July (2:30 pm)	Collingwood	8.17 (65)	**6.9 (45)**	Lost by 20 points	Victoria Park (A)	12,000	3–10
14	Saturday, 19 July (2:30 pm)	Footscray	13.18 (96)	**10.7 (67)**	Lost by 29 points	Western Oval (A)	10,000	3–11
15	Saturday, 26 July (2:30 pm)	St Kilda	**16.18 (114)**	10.9 (69)	Won by 45 points	Glenferrie Oval (H)	5,000	4–11
16	Saturday, 2 August (2:45 pm)	Richmond	13.18 (96)	**8.7 (55)**	Lost by 41 points	Punt Road Oval (A)	12,000	4–12
17	Saturday, 16 August (2:45 pm)	Melbourne	13.21 (99)	**14.9 (93)**	Lost by 6 points	Melbourne Cricket Ground (A)	11,134	4–13
18	Saturday, 23 August (2:45 pm)	South Melbourne	**12.11 (83)**	19.14 (128)	Lost by 45 points	Glenferrie Oval (H)	8,000	4–14
19	Saturday,30 August (2:45 pm)	North Melbourne	10.14 (74)	**10.10 (70)**	Lost by 4 points	Arden Street Oval (A)	4,000	4–15

== Ladder ==
(P)	Premiers
	Qualified for finals

#	Team	P	W	L	D	PF	PA	%	Pts
1	Carlton (P)	19	15	4	0	1833	1368	134.0	60
2	Essendon	19	14	5	0	1876	1528	122.8	56
3	Fitzroy	19	13	6	0	1736	1370	126.7	52
4	Richmond	19	12	7	0	1726	1582	109.1	48
5	Collingwood	19	11	7	1	1738	1546	112.4	46
6	Melbourne	19	11	8	0	1742	1488	117.1	44
7	Geelong	19	11	8	0	1761	1705	103.3	44
8	South Melbourne	19	8	10	1	1602	1652	97.0	34
9	Footscray	19	8	10	1	1646	1713	96.1	34
10	North Melbourne	19	4	15	0	1390	1789	77.7	16
11	Hawthorn	19	4	15	0	1456	1907	76.4	16
12	St Kilda	19	1	17	1	1221	2079	58.7	6

Rules for classification: 1. premiership points; 2. percentage; 3. points for
Average score: 86.5
Source: AFL Tables
