= 1979 Hawthorn Football Club season =

55th season in the Victorian Football League

Hawthorn Football Club
1979 season
- President: Phil J. Ryan
- Coach: David Parkin
- Captain: Don Scott
- Home ground: Princes Park
- VFL season: 10–12 (7th)
- Finals series: Did not qualify
- Best and Fairest: Kelvin Moore
- Leading goalkicker: Michael Moncrieff (45)
- Highest home attendance: 37,276 (Round 4 vs. South Melbourne)
- Lowest home attendance: 10,977 (Round 8 vs. Melbourne)
- Average home attendance: 20,016

The 1979 season was the Hawthorn Football Club's 55th season in the Victorian Football League and 78th overall. Hawthorn entered the season as the defending VFL Premiers. This was the first time since 1973 Hawthorn didn't qualify for finals.

== Fixture ==
=== Premiership season ===
Rd	Date and local time	Opponent	Scores (Hawthorn's scores indicated in bold)			Venue	Attendance	Record
Rd	Date and local time	Opponent	Home	Away	Result	Venue	Attendance	Record
1	Saturday, 7 April (2:10 pm)	St Kilda	19.14 (128)	**14.19 (103)**	Lost by 25 points	Moorabbin Oval (A)	22,060	0–1
2	Saturday, 14 April (2:10 pm)	Collingwood	**13.24 (102)**	19.18 (132)	Lost by 30 points	Princes Park (H)	29,391	0–2
3	Saturday, 21 April (2:10 pm)	Geelong	**18.15 (123)**	11.17 (83)	Won by 40 points	Princes Park (H)	14,876	1–2
4	Wednesday, 25 April (2:10 pm)	South Melbourne	**29.15 (189)**	15.5 (95)	Won by 94 points	VFL Park (H)	37,276	2–2
5	Saturday, 5 May (2:10 pm)	Richmond	11.16 (82)	**24.17 (161)**	Won by 79 points	Melbourne Cricket Ground (A)	31,479	3–2
6	Saturday, 12 May (2:10 pm)	Carlton	**16.12 (108)**	25.18 (168)	Lost by 60 points	Princes Park (H)	29,935	3–3
7	Saturday, 19 May (2:10 pm)	Fitzroy	14.18 (102)	**11.24 (90)**	Lost by 12 points	Junction Oval (A)	15,872	3–4
8	Saturday, 26 May (2:10 pm)	Melbourne	**17.18 (120)**	10.17 (77)	Won by 43 points	Princes Park (H)	10,977	4–4
9	Saturday, 2 June (2:10 pm)	Essendon	**16.12 (108)**	17.14 (116)	Lost by 8 points	Princes Park (H)	24,875	4–5
10	Sunday, 10 June (2:10 pm)	North Melbourne	16.9 (105)	**23.18 (156)**	Won by 51 points	Sydney Cricket Ground (A)	31,395	5–5
11	Saturday, 16 June (2:10 pm)	Footscray	**15.10 (100)**	15.11 (101)	Lost by 1 point	Princes Park (H)	12,516	5–6
12	Saturday, 23 June (2:10 pm)	St Kilda	**19.18 (132)**	13.15 (93)	Won by 39 points	Princes Park (H)	13,176	5–7
13	Saturday, 30 June (2:10 pm)	Collingwood	25.19 (169)	**8.16 (64)**	Lost by 105 points	Victoria Park (A)	22,903	5–8
14	Saturday, 7 July (2:10 pm)	South Melbourne	13.11 (89)	**10.14 (74)**	Lost by 15 points	Lake Oval (A)	10,626	5–9
15	Saturday, 14 July (2:10 pm)	Geelong	11.12 (78)	**11.13 (79)**	Won by 1 point	VFL Park (A)	20,777	6–9
16	Saturday, 21 July (2:10 pm)	Richmond	**14.20 (104)**	18.11 (119)	Lost by 15 points	Princes Park (H)	13,557	6–10
17	Saturday, 28 July (2:10 pm)	Carlton	15.21 (111)	**12.11 (83)**	Lost by 28 points	Princes Park (A)	22,159	6–11
18	Saturday, 4 August (2:10 pm)	Fitzroy	**15.14 (104)**	15.25 (115)	Lost by 11 points	Princes Park (H)	15,104	6–12
19	Saturday, 11 August (2:10 pm)	Melbourne	8.25 (73)	**14.11 (95)**	Won by 22 points	VFL Park (A)	12,827	7–12
20	Saturday, 18 August (2:10 pm)	Essendon	9.16 (70)	**10.14 (74)**	Won by 4 points	Windy Hill (A)	18,671	8–12
21	Saturday, 25 August (2:10 pm)	North Melbourne	**7.18 (60)**	24.21 (165)	Lost by 105 points	Princes Park (H)	18,492	8–13
22	Saturday, 1 September (2:10 pm)	Footscray	9.11 (65)	**14.19 (103)**	Won by 38 points	Western Oval (A)	12,839	9–13

== Ladder ==
(P)	Premiers
	Qualified for finals

#	Team	P	W	L	D	PF	PA	%	Pts
1	Carlton (P)	22	19	3	0	2772	1986	139.6	76
2	North Melbourne	22	17	5	0	2574	2083	123.6	68
3	Collingwood	22	15	7	0	2501	1974	126.7	60
4	Fitzroy	22	15	7	0	2699	2198	122.8	60
5	Essendon	22	12	9	1	2236	2127	105.1	50
6	Geelong	22	12	10	0	2149	2140	100.4	48
7	Hawthorn	22	10	12	0	2332	2336	99.8	40
8	Richmond	22	9	13	0	2451	2512	97.6	36
9	Footscray	22	7	14	1	2015	2463	81.8	30
10	South Melbourne	22	6	16	0	2424	2666	90.9	24
11	Melbourne	22	6	16	0	2093	2759	75.9	24
12	St Kilda	22	3	19	0	1857	2859	65.0	12

Rules for classification: 1. premiership points; 2. percentage; 3. points for
Average score: 106.5
Source: AFL Tables
