= 1975 Hawthorn Football Club season =

51st season in the Victorian Football League

Hawthorn Football Club
1975 season
- President: Phil J. Ryan
- Coach: John Kennedy, Sr.
- Captain: Peter Crimmins
- Home ground: Princes Park
- VFL season: 17–5 (1st)
- Finals Series: Grand Final (lost to North Melbourne 67–122)
- Best and Fairest: Peter Knights
- Leading goalkicker: Leigh Matthews (68)
- Highest home attendance: 110,551 (Grand Final vs. North Melbourne)
- Lowest home attendance: 8,417 (Round 19 vs. Geelong)
- Average home attendance: 26,011

The 1975 season was the Hawthorn Football Club's 51st season in the Victorian Football League and 74th overall. Hawthorn finished as minor premiers for the fourth time and the first time since 1971, This was the first time Hawthorn qualified for finals in consecutive seasons. Hawthorn qualified for their fourth Grand Final and their first since 1971. Hawthorn were defeated by North Melbourne in the Grand Final 67–122. This was their first Grand Final defeat since 1963.

== Fixture ==
=== Premiership season ===
Rd	Date and local time	Opponent	Scores (Hawthorn's scores indicated in bold)			Venue	Attendance	Record
Rd	Date and local time	Opponent	Home	Away	Result	Venue	Attendance	Record
1	Saturday, 5 April (2:10 pm)	North Melbourne	**15.15 (105)**	11.10 (76)	Won by 29 points	Princes Park (H)	14,978	1–0
2	Saturday, 12 April (2:10 pm)	St Kilda	11.15 (81)	**17.19 (121)**	Won by 40 points	Moorabbin Oval (A)	18,465	2–0
3	Saturday, 19 April (2:10 pm)	Richmond	12.15 (87)	**17.14 (116)**	Won by 29 points	VFL Park (A)	39,496	3–0
4	Saturday, 26 April (2:10 pm)	South Melbourne	9.15 (69)	**13.21 (99)**	Won by 30 points	Lake Oval (A)	12,708	4–0
5	Saturday, 3 May (2:10 pm)	Melbourne	**19.22 (136)**	11.15 (81)	Won by 55 points	Princes Park (H)	11,198	5–0
6	Saturday, 10 May (2:10 pm)	Carlton	16.15 (111)	**12.13 (85)**	Lost by 26 points	Princes Park (A)	28,532	5–1
7	Saturday, 17 May (2:10 pm)	Fitzroy	**19.16 (130)**	13.12 (90)	Won by 40 points	Princes Park (H)	10,940	6–1
8	Saturday, 24 May (2:10 pm)	Geelong	5.10 (40)	**17.11 (113)**	Won by 73 points	VFL Park (A)	23,466	7–1
9	Saturday, 31 May (2:10 pm)	Footscray	8.10 (58)	**20.14 (134)**	Won by 76 points	Western Oval (A)	15,933	8–1
10	Saturday, 7 June (2:10 pm)	Collingwood	**19.24 (138)**	13.11 (89)	Won by 49 points	Princes Park (H)	24,061	9–1
11	Monday, 16 June (2:10 pm)	Essendon	13.12 (90)	**21.20 (146)**	Won by 56 points	Windy Hill (A)	23,244	10–1
12	Saturday, 21 June (2:10 pm)	North Melbourne	13.17 (95)	**18.12 (120)**	Won by 25 points	Arden Street Oval (A)	15,478	11–1
13	Saturday, 28 June (2:10 pm)	St Kilda	**11.19 (85)**	7.19 (61)	Won by 24 points	Princes Park (H)	15,533	12–1
14	Saturday, 5 July (2:10 pm)	South Melbourne	**9.10 (64)**	5.9 (39)	Won by 25 points	VFL Park (H)	14,008	13–1
15	Saturday, 12 July (2:10 pm)	Richmond	**14.10 (94)**	2.20 (32)	Won by 62 points	Princes Park (H)	17,276	14–1
16	Saturday, 19 July (2:10 pm)	Melbourne	15.17 (107)	**17.17 (119)**	Won by 12 points	Melbourne Cricket Ground (A)	18,829	15–1
17	Saturday, 26 July (2:10 pm)	Carlton	**15.15 (105)**	15.11 (101)	Won by 4 points	Princes Park (H)	31,253	16–1
18	Saturday, 2 August (2:10 pm)	Fitzroy	15.23 (113)	**10.19 (79)**	Lost by 34 points	Junction Oval (A)	9,139	16–2
19	Saturday, 9 August (2:10 pm)	Geelong	**25.23 (173)**	8.7 (55)	Won by 118 points	Princes Park (H)	8,417	17–2
20	Saturday, 16 August (2:10 pm)	Footscray	**13.13 (91)**	14.9 (93)	Lost by 2 points	VFL Park (H)	15,601	17–3
21	Saturday, 23 August (2:10 pm)	Collingwood	7.15 (57)	**3.9 (27)**	Lost by 30 points	Victoria Park (A)	26,303	17–4
22	Saturday, 30 August (2:10 pm)	Essendon	**14.19 (103)**	17.8 (110)	Lost by 7 points	Princes Park (H)	12,236	17–5

=== Finals Series ===
Rd	Date and local time	Opponent	Scores (Hawthorn's scores indicated in bold)			Venue	Attendance
Rd	Date and local time	Opponent	Home	Away	Result	Venue	Attendance
First semi-final	Saturday, 13 September (2:30 pm)	North Melbourne	**12.10 (82)**	10.11 (71)	Won by 11 points	VFL Park (H)	52,076
Grand Final	Saturday, 27 September (2:50 pm)	North Melbourne	**9.13 (67)**	19.8 (122)	Lost by 55 points	Melbourne Cricket Ground (H)	110,551

== Ladder ==
(P)	Premiers
	Qualified for finals

#	Team	P	W	L	D	PF	PA	%	Pts
1	Hawthorn	22	17	5	0	2383	1735	137.3	68
2	Carlton	22	16	6	0	2360	1827	129.2	64
3	North Melbourne (P)	22	14	8	0	2096	1821	115.1	56
4	Richmond	22	13	9	0	2269	1999	113.5	52
5	Collingwood	22	13	9	0	1983	2112	93.9	52
6	St Kilda	22	11	11	0	1982	1954	101.4	44
7	Footscray	22	11	11	0	1968	2076	94.8	44
8	Essendon	22	10	12	0	2222	2451	90.7	40
9	Fitzroy	22	9	13	0	2079	2142	97.1	36
10	Melbourne	22	9	13	0	2092	2234	93.6	36
11	Geelong	22	7	15	0	1735	2218	78.2	28
12	South Melbourne	22	2	20	0	1798	2398	75.0	8

Rules for classification: 1. premiership points; 2. percentage; 3. points for
Average score: 94.6
Source: AFL Tables
