= 1970 Hawthorn Football Club season =

46th season in the Victorian Football League

Hawthorn Football Club
1970 season
- President: Phil J. Ryan
- Coach: John Kennedy, Sr.
- Captain: David Parkin
- Home ground: Glenferrie Oval
- VFL season: 10–12 (8th)
- Finals series: Did not qualify
- Best and Fairest: Peter Hudson
- Leading goalkicker: Peter Hudson (146)
- Highest home attendance: 26,068 (Round 6 vs. Richmond)
- Lowest home attendance: 8,061 (Round 21 vs. North Melbourne)
- Average home attendance: 17,248

The 1970 season was the Hawthorn Football Club's 46th season in the Victorian Football League and 69th overall.

== Fixture ==
=== Premiership season ===
Rd	Date and local time	Opponent	Scores (Hawthorn's scores indicated in bold)			Venue	Attendance	Record
Rd	Date and local time	Opponent	Home	Away	Result	Venue	Attendance	Record
1	Saturday, 4 April (2:10 pm)	Geelong	**19.12 (126)**	21.9 (135)	Lost by 9 points	Glenferrie Oval (H)	20,509	0–1
2	Saturday, 11 April (2:10 pm)	Melbourne	14.12 (96)	**11.19 (85)**	Lost by 11 points	Melbourne Cricket Ground (A)	25,575	0–2
3	Saturday, 18 April (2:10 pm)	Collingwood	14.24 (108)	**15.11 (101)**	Lost by 7 points	Victoria Park (A)	24,352	0–3
4	Saturday, 25 April (2:10 pm)	Essendon	**10.10 (70)**	16.14 (110)	Lost by 40 points	Glenferrie Oval (H)	19,017	0–4
5	Saturday, 2 May (2:05 pm)	Footscray	11.13 (79)	**10.10 (76)**	Lost by 3 points	Western Oval (A)	19,610	0–5
6	Saturday, 9 May (2:10 pm)	Richmond	**20.10 (130)**	21.11 (137)	Lost by 7 points	VFL Park (H)	26,068	0–6
7	Saturday, 16 May (2:10 pm)	St Kilda	10.21 (81)	**8.8 (56)**	Lost by 25 points	Moorabbin Oval (A)	17,618	0–7
8	Saturday, 23 May (2:10 pm)	South Melbourne	**21.20 (146)**	12.12 (84)	Won by 62 points	Glenferrie Oval (H)	17,070	1–7
9	Saturday, 30 May (2:10 pm)	Carlton	10.14 (74)	**15.16 (106)**	Won by 32 points	Princes Park (A)	21,216	2–7
10	Saturday, 6 June (2:10 pm)	North Melbourne	9.8 (62)	**11.9 (75)**	Won by 13 points	VFL Park (A)	13,662	3–7
11	Monday, 15 June (2:10 pm)	Fitzroy	**18.12 (120)**	12.8 (80)	Won by 40 points	Glenferrie Oval (H)	14,495	4–7
12	Saturday, 20 June (2:10 pm)	Geelong	14.15 (99)	**10.11 (71)**	Lost by 28 points	Kardinia Park (A)	19,698	4–8
13	Saturday, 27 June (2:10 pm)	Melbourne	**16.17 (113)**	11.8 (74)	Won by 39 points	Glenferrie Oval (H)	13,196	5–8
14	Saturday, 4 July (2:10 pm)	Collingwood	**18.7 (115)**	13.13 (91)	Won by 24 points	Glenferrie Oval (H)	19,600	6–8
15	Saturday, 11 July (2:10 pm)	Essendon	9.8 (62)	**21.4 (130)**	Won by 68 points	Windy Hill (A)	13,054	7–8
16	Saturday, 18 July (2:10 pm)	Footscray	**23.9 (147)**	6.12 (48)	Won by 99 points	VFL Park (H)	14,169	8–8
17	Saturday, 25 July (2:10 pm)	Richmond	15.15 (105)	**11.17 (83)**	Lost by 22 points	Melbourne Cricket Ground (A)	55,740	8–9
18	Saturday, 1 August (2:10 pm)	St Kilda	**11.11 (77)**	14.18 (102)	Lost by 25 points	Glenferrie Oval (H)	16,698	8–10
19	Saturday, 8 August (2:10 pm)	South Melbourne	16.7 (103)	**13.8 (86)**	Lost by 17 points	Lake Oval (A)	17,439	8–11
20	Saturday, 15 August (2:10 pm)	Carlton	**13.9 (87)**	18.9 (117)	Lost by 30 points	Glenferrie Oval (H)	20,845	8–12
21	Saturday, 22 August (2:10 pm)	North Melbourne	**21.14 (140)**	9.20 (74)	Won by 66 points	Glenferrie Oval (H)	8,061	9–12
22	Saturday, 29 August (2:10 pm)	Fitzroy	9.11 (65)	**18.16 (124)**	Won by 59 points	Junction Oval (A)	11,626	10–12

== Ladder ==
(P)	Premiers
	Qualified for finals

#	Team	P	W	L	D	PF	PA	%	Pts
1	Collingwood	22	18	4	0	2333	1709	136.5	72
2	Carlton (P)	22	16	6	0	2146	1911	112.3	64
3	St Kilda	22	14	8	0	1926	1532	125.7	56
4	South Melbourne	22	14	8	0	1914	1828	104.7	56
5	Geelong	22	12	10	0	1949	1903	102.4	48
6	Richmond	22	12	10	0	2029	1998	101.6	48
7	Footscray	22	11	11	0	1728	1894	91.2	44
8	Hawthorn	22	10	12	0	2264	1986	114.0	40
9	Fitzroy	22	9	13	0	1774	2155	82.3	36
10	Melbourne	22	6	16	0	1705	2043	83.5	24
11	Essendon	22	6	16	0	1734	2128	81.5	24
12	North Melbourne	22	4	18	0	1574	1989	79.1	16

Rules for classification: 1. premiership points; 2. percentage; 3. points for
Average score: 87.4
Source: AFL Tables
