= 1971 Hawthorn Football Club season =

47th season in the Victorian Football League

Hawthorn Football Club
1971 season
- President: Phil J. Ryan
- Coach: John Kennedy, Sr.
- Captain: David Parkin
- Home ground: Glenferrie Oval
- VFL season: 19–3 (1st)
- Finals series: Premiers (Defeated St Kilda 82–75)
- Best and Fairest: Leigh Matthews
- Leading goalkicker: Peter Hudson (150)
- Highest home attendance: 118,192 (Grand Final vs. St Kilda)
- Lowest home attendance: 9,112 (Round 19 vs. North Melbourne)
- Average home attendance: 32,198

The 1971 season was the Hawthorn Football Club 47th season in the Victorian Football League and 70th overall. Hawthorn finished as the minor premiers for the first time since 1963. Hawthorn qualified for the finals for the first time since 1963. Hawthorn qualified for their third Grand Final and first since 1963. Hawthorn defeated St Kilda in the Grand Final 82–75 to win their second VFL premiership and first since 1961. Peter Hudson kicked 150 goals equalling the record set by Bob Pratt in 1934.

== Fixture ==
=== Premiership season ===
Rd	Date and local time	Opponent	Scores (Hawthorn's scores indicated in bold)			Venue	Attendance	Record
Rd	Date and local time	Opponent	Home	Away	Result	Venue	Attendance	Record
1	Saturday, 3 April (2:10 pm)	Essendon	10.12 (72)	**13.18 (96)**	Won by 24 points	Windy Hill (A)	19,214	1–0
2	Saturday, 10 April (2:10 pm)	Fitzroy	**14.13 (97)**	7.11 (53)	Won by 44 points	Glenferrie Oval (H)	15,310	2–0
3	Saturday, 17 April (2:10 pm)	Geelong	**16.19 (115)**	16.11 (107)	Won by 8 points	Glenferrie Oval (H)	14,094	3–0
4	Saturday, 24 April (2:10 pm)	St Kilda	10.9 (69)	**18.19 (127)**	Won by 58 points	Moorabbin Oval (A)	25,153	4–0
5	Saturday, 1 May (2:10 pm)	South Melbourne	**12.21 (93)**	6.9 (45)	Won by 48 points	VFL Park (H)	16,205	5–0
6	Saturday, 8 May (2:10 pm)	Footscray	18.5 (113)	**16.11 (107)**	Lost by 6 points	Western Oval (A)	19,205	5–1
7	Saturday, 15 May (2:10 pm)	Richmond	**21.19 (145)**	12.6 (78)	Won by 67 points	Glenferrie Oval (H)	22,976	6–1
8	Saturday, 22 May (2:10 pm)	North Melbourne	7.10 (52)	**22.15 (147)**	Won by 95 points	VFL Park (A)	14,843	7–1
9	Saturday, 29 May (2:10 pm)	Carlton	4.12 (36)	**14.12 (96)**	Won by 60 points	Princes Park (A)	30,151	8–1
10	Saturday, 5 June (2:10 pm)	Collingwood	**15.17 (107)**	7.13 (55)	Won by 52 points	Glenferrie Oval (H)	28,451	9–1
11	Monday, 14 June (2:10 pm)	Melbourne	10.14 (74)	**14.10 (94)**	Won by 20 points	Melbourne Cricket Ground (A)	52,256	10–1
12	Saturday, 19 June (2:10 pm)	Essendon	**14.20 (104)**	11.5 (71)	Won by 33 points	Glenferrie Oval (H)	12,219	11–1
13	Saturday, 26 June (2:10 pm)	Fitzroy	7.16 (58)	**14.9 (93)**	Won by 35 points	VFL Park (A)	18,378	12–1
14	Saturday, 3 July (2:10 pm)	Geelong	13.6 (84)	**15.13 (103)**	Won by 19 points	Kardinia Park (A)	14,733	13–1
15	Saturday, 10 July (2:10 pm)	St Kilda	**20.5 (125)**	15.12 (102)	Won by 23 points	Glenferrie Oval (H)	22,542	14–1
16	Saturday, 17 July (2:10 pm)	South Melbourne	3.15 (33)	**11.16 (82)**	Won by 49 points	Lake Oval (A)	10,471	15–1
17	Saturday, 24 July (2:10 pm)	Footscray	**23.16 (154)**	4.15 (39)	Won by 115 points	Glenferrie Oval (H)	21,979	16–1
18	Saturday, 31 July (2:10 pm)	Richmond	16.12 (108)	**11.10 (76)**	Lost by 32 points	Melbourne Cricket Ground (A)	47,931	16–2
19	Saturday, 7 August (2:10 pm)	North Melbourne	**23.16 (154)**	9.8 (62)	Won by 92 points	Glenferrie Oval (H)	9,122	17–2
20	Saturday, 14 August (2:10 pm)	Carlton	**11.15 (81)**	19.6 (120)	Lost by 39 points	Glenferrie Oval (H)	22,781	17–3
21	Saturday, 21 August (2:10 pm)	Collingwood	15.15 (105)	**20.20 (140)**	Won by 35 points	Victoria Park (A)	41,312	18–3
22	Saturday, 28 August (2:10 pm)	Melbourne	**18.16 (124)**	8.17 (65)	Won by 59 points	Glenferrie Oval (H)	14,876	19–3

=== Finals series ===
Rd	Date and local time	Opponent	Scores (Hawthorn's scores indicated in bold)			Venue	Attendance
Rd	Date and local time	Opponent	Home	Away	Result	Venue	Attendance
Second Semi-Final	Saturday, 11 September (2:30 pm)	St Kilda	**12.18 (90)**	12.16 (88)	Won by 2 points	Melbourne Cricket Ground (H)	99,822
Grand Final	Saturday, 25 September (2:50 pm)	St Kilda	**12.10 (82)**	11.9 (75)	Won by 7 points	Melbourne Cricket Ground (H)	118,192

== Ladder ==
(P)	Premiers
	Qualified for finals

#	Team	P	W	L	D	PF	PA	%	Pts
1	Hawthorn (P)	22	19	3	0	2460	1601	153.7	76
2	St Kilda	22	16	6	0	2176	1554	140.0	64
3	Richmond	22	16	6	0	2318	1890	122.6	64
4	Collingwood	22	14	7	1	2331	1840	126.7	58
5	Carlton	22	14	8	0	2103	2014	104.4	56
6	Fitzroy	22	12	10	0	2047	1915	106.9	48
7	Melbourne	22	11	10	1	1962	1791	109.5	46
8	Footscray	22	11	11	0	1966	2217	88.7	44
9	North Melbourne	22	5	16	1	1705	2551	66.8	22
10	Geelong	22	5	17	0	2072	2523	82.1	20
11	Essendon	22	4	17	1	1705	2252	75.7	18
12	South Melbourne	22	3	19	0	1618	2315	69.9	12

Rules for classification: 1. premiership points; 2. percentage; 3. points for
Average score: 92.7
Source: AFL Tables
