= St Mary's Football Club =

St Mary's Football Club may refer to

- St Mary's Football Club (NTFL), an Australian rules football club in the Northern Territory Football League
- St Mary's Sporting Club, an Australian rules football club in the Geelong Football League
- St Mary's Football Club (NFL), an Australian rules football club, based in Greensborough, Victoria, playing in the Northern Football League
