= John Condon =

John or Jack Condon may refer to:

- John Condon (boxer) (1889–1919), British bantamweight professional boxer
- John Condon (British Army soldier) (1897–1915), previously thought to be the youngest British soldier killed in the First World War
- John F. Condon (Lindbergh kidnapping), hired by Charles Lindbergh in 1932
- John F. Condon (1860–1945), American college football coach and school principal
- John F.X. Condon (1914–1989), American public address announcer
- John Condon (hurler) (1872–1944), Irish hurler
- John P. Condon (1911–1996), aviator in the United States Marine Corps
- John Peter Condon (1920–2011), diplomat and US Ambassador to Fiji, Tonga, and Tuvalu
- Jack Condon (1909–1967), South African tennis player
- Jack Condon (footballer) (1922–2015), Australian rules footballer
