= 1973 Hawthorn Football Club season =

49th season in the Victorian Football League

Hawthorn Football Club
1973 season
- President: Phil J. Ryan
- Coach: John Kennedy, Sr. Roy Simmonds (acting)
- Captain: David Parkin
- Home ground: Glenferrie Oval
- VFL season: 11–11 (7th)
- Finals series: Did not qualify
- Best and Fairest: Don Scott
- Leading goalkicker: Leigh Matthews (51)
- Highest home attendance: 32,101 (Round 3 vs. Essendon)
- Lowest home attendance: 9,932 (Round 22 vs. South Melbourne)
- Average home attendance: 16,308

The 1973 season was the Hawthorn Football Club's 49th season in the Victorian Football League and 72nd overall.

== Fixture ==
=== Premiership season ===
Rd	Date and local time	Opponent	Scores (Hawthorn's scores indicated in bold)			Venue	Attendance	Record
Rd	Date and local time	Opponent	Home	Away	Result	Venue	Attendance	Record
1	Saturday, 7 April (2:10 pm)	North Melbourne	14.14 (98)	**9.16 (70)**	Lost by 28 points	Arden Street Oval (A)	15,934	0–1
2	Saturday, 14 April (2:10 pm)	Melbourne	**14.14 (98)**	13.22 (100)	Lost by 2 points	Glenferrie Oval (H)	13,336	0–2
3	Monday, 23 April (2:10 pm)	Essendon	**27.8 (170)**	15.12 (102)	Won by 68 points	VFL Park (H)	32,101	1–2
4	Saturday, 28 April (2:10 pm)	Carlton	14.11 (95)	**12.11 (83)**	Lost by 12 points	Princes Park Football Ground (A)	28,872	1–3
5	Saturday, 5 May (2:10 pm)	Footscray	**18.16 (124)**	16.12 (108)	Won by 16 points	Glenferrie Oval (H)	11,492	2–3
6	Saturday, 12 May (2:10 pm)	Fitzroy	15.17 (107)	**12.13 (85)**	Lost by 22 points	Junction Oval (A)	10,706	2–4
7	Saturday, 19 May (2:10 pm)	Geelong	**19.15 (129)**	9.14 (68)	Won by 61 points	Glenferrie Oval (H)	11,701	3–4
8	Saturday, 26 May (2:10 pm)	Richmond	10.22 (82)	**16.23 (119)**	Won by 37 points	Melbourne Cricket Ground (A)	32,613	4–4
9	Monday, 4 June (2:10 pm)	St Kilda	11.12 (78)	**8.16 (64)**	Lost by 14 points	Moorabbin Oval (A)	22,521	4–5
10	Saturday, 9 June (2:10 pm)	Collingwood	**14.11 (95)**	15.18 (108)	Lost by 13 points	Glenferrie Oval (H)	20,053	4–6
11	Saturday, 16 June (2:10 pm)	South Melbourne	11.10 (76)	**17.17 (119)**	Won by 43 points	VFL Park (A)	9,413	5–6
12	Saturday, 23 June (2:10 pm)	North Melbourne	**12.13 (85)**	10.10 (70)	Won by 15 points	Glenferrie Oval (H)	12,470	6–6
13	Saturday, 30 June (2:10 pm)	Melbourne	15.15 (105)	**15.22 (112)**	Won by 7 points	Melbourne Cricket Ground (A)	25,787	7–6
14	Saturday, 7 July (2:10 pm)	Carlton	**14.24 (108)**	12.14 (86)	Won by 22 points	Glenferrie Oval (H)	18,406	8–6
15	Saturday, 14 July (2:10 pm)	Essendon	23.13 (151)	**18.8 (116)**	Lost by 35 points	Windy Hill (A)	22,437	8–7
16	Saturday, 21 July (2:10 pm)	Footscray	6.9 (45)	**9.11 (65)**	Won by 20 points	Western Oval (A)	10,987	9–7
17	Saturday, 28 July (2:10 pm)	Fitzroy	**15.10 (100)**	9.9 (63)	Won by 37 points	Glenferrie Oval (H)	12,477	10–7
18	Saturday, 4 August (2:10 pm)	Geelong	14.11 (95)	**14.10 (94)**	Lost by 1 point	Kardinia Park (A)	13,546	10–8
19	Saturday, 11 August (2:10 pm)	Richmond	**11.11 (77)**	12.10 (82)	Lost by 5 points	Glenferrie Oval (H)	20,376	10–9
20	Saturday, 18 August (2:10 pm)	St Kilda	**11.11 (77)**	15.8 (98)	Lost by 21 points	Glenferrie Oval (H)	17,042	10–10
21	Saturday, 25 August (2:10 pm)	Collingwood	16.10 (106)	**13.10 (88)**	Lost by 18 points	VFL Park (A)	48,312	10–11
22	Saturday, 1 September (2:10 pm)	South Melbourne	**16.20 (116)**	11.13 (79)	Won by 37 points	Glenferrie Oval (H)	9,932	11–11

== Ladder ==
(P)	Premiers
	Qualified for finals

#	Team	P	W	L	D	PF	PA	%	Pts
1	Collingwood	22	19	3	0	2356	1878	125.5	76
2	Richmond (P)	22	17	5	0	2301	1957	117.6	68
3	Carlton	22	15	7	0	2342	1850	126.6	60
4	Essendon	22	13	9	0	2443	2341	104.4	52
5	St Kilda	22	12	10	0	2024	1922	105.3	48
6	North Melbourne	22	11	10	1	1938	1986	97.6	46
7	Hawthorn	22	11	11	0	2194	2002	109.6	44
8	Fitzroy	22	9	13	0	1990	2194	90.7	36
9	Footscray	22	7	14	1	1860	2109	88.2	30
10	Melbourne	22	7	15	0	1938	2111	91.8	28
11	Geelong	22	6	16	0	1903	2426	78.4	24
12	South Melbourne	22	4	18	0	1932	2445	79.0	16

Rules for classification: 1. premiership points; 2. percentage; 3. points for
Average score: 95.5
Source: AFL Tables
