= 1972 Hawthorn Football Club season =

48th season in the Victorian Football League

Hawthorn Football Club
1972 season
- President: Phil J. Ryan
- Coach: John Kennedy, Sr.
- Captain: David Parkin
- Home ground: Glenferrie Oval
- VFL season: 13–9 (6th)
- Finals series: Did not qualify
- Best and Fairest: Leigh Matthews
- Leading goalkicker: Peter Knights (46)
- Highest home attendance: 38,861 (Round 20 vs. Essendon)
- Lowest home attendance: 8,206 (Round 13 vs. North Melbourne)
- Average home attendance: 19,797

The 1972 season was the Hawthorn Football Club's 48th season in the Victorian Football League and 71st overall. Hawthorn entered the season as the defending VFL Premiers.

== Fixture ==
=== Premiership season ===
Rd	Date and local time	Opponent	Scores (Hawthorn's scores indicated in bold)			Venue	Attendance	Record
Rd	Date and local time	Opponent	Home	Away	Result	Venue	Attendance	Record
1	Saturday, 1 April (2:10 pm)	Melbourne	**15.14 (104)**	10.15 (75)	Won by 29 points	Glenferrie Oval (H)	21,513	1–0
2	Saturday, 8 April (2:10 pm)	North Melbourne	11.10 (76)	**19.24 (138)**	Won by 62 points	Arden Street Oval (A)	10,200	2–0
3	Saturday, 15 April (2:10 pm)	Geelong	9.11 (65)	**15.17 (107)**	Won by 42 points	VFL Park (A)	16,431	3–0
4	Saturday, 22 April (2:10 pm)	Fitzroy	11.17 (83)	**9.10 (64)**	Lost by 19 points	Junction Oval (A)	16,397	3–1
5	Saturday, 29 April (2:10 pm)	Footscray	**14.20 (104)**	11.10 (76)	Won by 28 points	Glenferrie Oval (H)	15,440	4–1
6	Saturday, 6 May (2:10 pm)	Collingwood	14.12 (96)	**15.11 (101)**	Won by 5 points	Victoria Park (A)	29,885	5–1
7	Saturday, 13 May (2:10 pm)	South Melbourne	**13.14 (92)**	9.20 (74)	Won by 18 points	Glenferrie Oval (H)	13,727	6–1
8	Saturday, 20 May (2:10 pm)	Richmond	11.25 (91)	**13.6 (84)**	Lost by 7 points	VFL Park (A)	25,661	6–2
9	Saturday, 27 May (2:10 pm)	Essendon	15.17 (107)	**14.21 (105)**	Lost by 2 points	Windy Hill (A)	28,187	6–3
10	Saturday, 3 June (2:10 pm)	Carlton	**11.22 (88)**	13.7 (85)	Won by 3 points	Glenferrie Oval (H)	26,585	7–3
11	Saturday, 10 June (2:10 pm)	St Kilda	17.8 (110)	**7.14 (56)**	Lost by 54 points	Moorabbin Oval (A)	27,313	7–4
12	Saturday, 17 June (2:10 pm)	Melbourne	11.10 (76)	**11.9 (75)**	Lost by 1 point	Melbourne Cricket Ground (A)	31,314	7–5
13	Saturday, 1 July (2:10 pm)	North Melbourne	**21.14 (140)**	10.16 (76)	Won by 64 points	Glenferrie Oval (H)	8,206	8–5
14	Saturday, 8 July (2:10 pm)	Fitzroy	**19.19 (133)**	12.8 (80)	Won by 53 points	Glenferrie Oval (H)	12,375	9–5
15	Saturday, 15 July (2:10 pm)	Geelong	**19.14 (128)**	15.8 (98)	Won by 30 points	Glenferrie Oval (H)	16,844	10–5
16	Saturday, 22 July (2:10 pm)	Footscray	13.11 (89)	**19.16 (130)**	Won by 41 points	Western Oval (A)	18,400	11–5
17	Saturday, 29 July (2:10 pm)	Collingwood	**11.16 (82)**	19.13 (127)	Lost by 45 points	Glenferrie Oval (H)	24,132	11–6
18	Saturday, 5 August (2:10 pm)	South Melbourne	13.11 (89)	**23.10 (148)**	Won by 59 points	Lake Oval (A)	9,207	12–6
19	Saturday, 12 August (2:10 pm)	Richmond	**15.12 (102)**	17.11 (113)	Lost by 11 points	Glenferrie Oval (H)	18,834	12–7
20	Saturday, 19 August (2:10 pm)	Essendon	**15.16 (106)**	12.15 (87)	Won by 19 points	VFL Park (H)	36,861	13–7
21	Saturday, 26 August (2:10 pm)	Carlton	24.12 (156)	**11.22 (88)**	Lost by 68 points	Princes Park (A)	32,048	13–8
22	Saturday, 2 September (2:10 pm)	St Kilda	**15.12 (102)**	18.13 (121)	Lost by 19 points	Glenferrie Oval (H)	22,923	13–9

== Ladder ==
(P)	Premiers
	Qualified for finals

#	Team	P	W	L	D	PF	PA	%	Pts
1	Carlton (P)	22	18	3	1	2237	1666	134.3	74
2	Richmond	22	18	4	0	2469	2098	117.7	72
3	Collingwood	22	14	7	1	2338	1747	133.8	58
4	St Kilda	22	14	8	0	1989	1721	115.6	56
5	Essendon	22	14	8	0	2317	2140	108.3	56
6	Hawthorn	22	13	9	0	2277	2050	111.1	52
7	Footscray	22	11	11	0	1930	2038	94.7	44
8	Melbourne	22	10	12	0	2043	1929	105.9	40
9	Fitzroy	22	9	13	0	1997	2062	96.8	36
10	Geelong	22	7	15	0	1994	2369	84.2	28
11	South Melbourne	22	2	20	0	1513	2323	65.1	8
12	North Melbourne	22	1	21	0	1628	2589	62.9	4

Rules for classification: 1. premiership points; 2. percentage; 3. points for
Average score: 93.7
Source: AFL Tables
