= Jai Serong =

Australian rules footballer (born 2003)

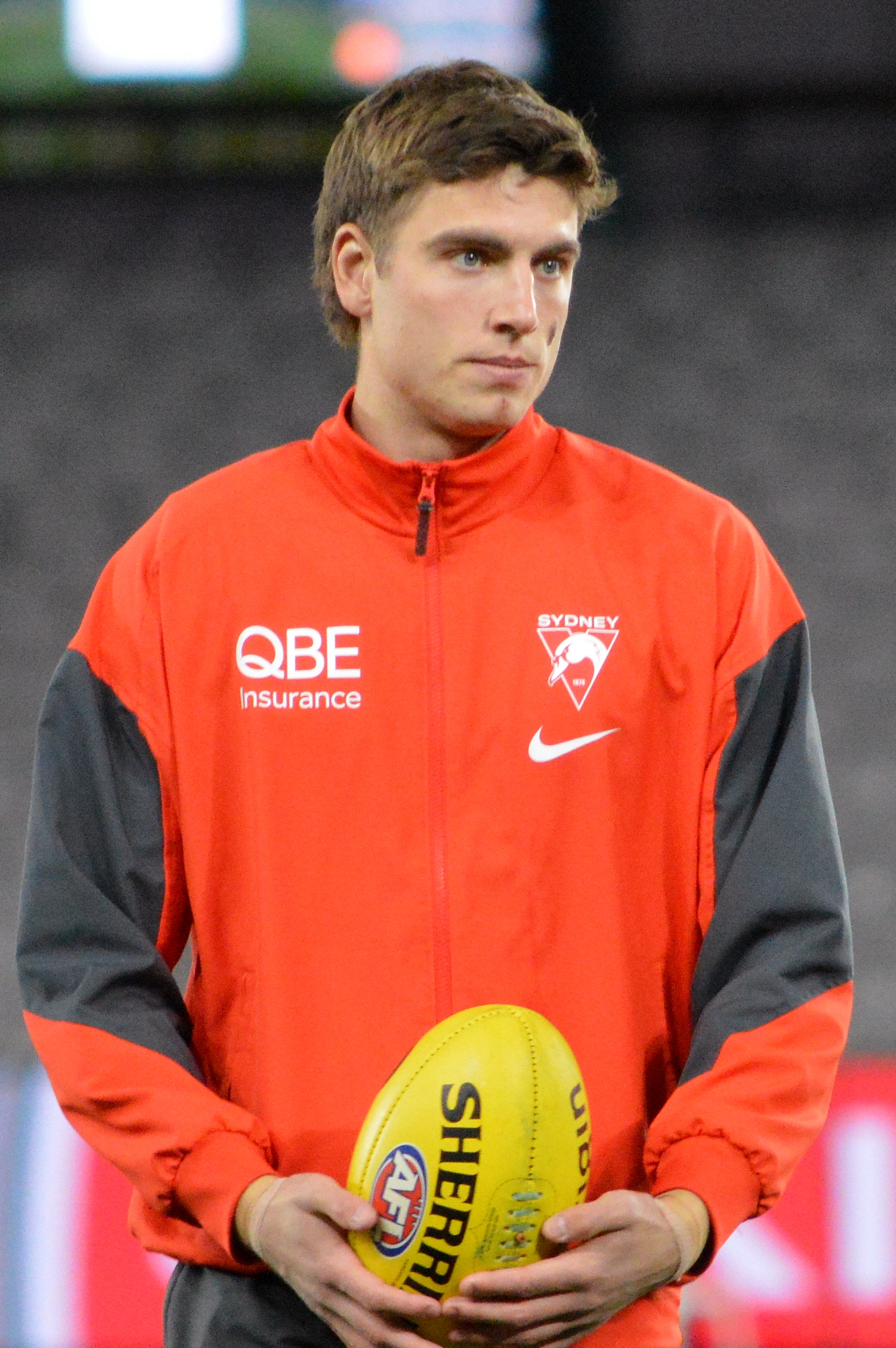
- Serong with Sydney in August 2026

Personal information
- Full name: Jai Serong
- Born: 16 February 2003 (age 23)
- Original team: Gippsland Power
- Draft: No. 53, 2021 national draft
- Debut: Round 21, 2022, Hawthorn vs. Gold Coast, at York Park, Launceston
- Height: 192 cm (6 ft 4 in)
- Weight: 80 kg (176 lb)
- Positions: Key Defender, Midfielder

Club information
- Current club: Sydney
- Number: 13

Playing career^{1}
Years	Club	Games (Goals)
2022–2025	Hawthorn	10 (1)
2026–	Sydney	24 (7)
Total		34 (8)
- ^{1} Playing statistics correct to the end of 2026.

Career highlights
- VFL Team of the Year: 2025; 2× Col Austen trophy: 2024, 2025

Jai Serong (born 16 February 2003) is a professional Australian rules footballer who currently plays for the Sydney Swans in the Australian Football League (AFL). He is the younger brother of Caleb Serong, who plays for Fremantle.

== Early life ==
Serong grew up on a dairy farm near the Victorian country town of Inverloch before his family moved to Warragul.

He was drafted with the 53rd selection in the 2021 AFL draft from Gippsland Power in the NAB League.

== AFL career ==
=== Hawthorn (2022–2025) ===
Serong made his debut in round 21 of the 2022 season when Hawthorn played Gold Coast in Launceston. He played in the final three rounds of the season.

His 2023 season was delayed because of injury. He suffered pericarditis.

Serong never saw consistent game time at Hawthorn, playing five AFL games in 2024 and none in 2025. Unable to play regular AFL football, he was a valued player for Hawthorn's VFL-affiliated side, the Box Hill Hawks. Playing 62 games at VFL level over four years, Serong won Box Hill's Best and Fairest, the Col Austen Trophy, in both 2024 and 2025. However, in hopes of playing consistent AFL football, Serong opted to leave Hawthorn at the end of the 2025 season, nominating Sydney as his preferred club.

=== Sydney Swans (2026–) ===
On the final day of the 2025 trade period, Jai Serong was traded to the Sydney Swans along with a fourth round pick in exchange for a third round draft selection.

Serong made his Sydney debut in round one of the 2026 AFL season at the SCG against Carlton, racking up nineteen disposals in a win. From there, Serong managed to find the consistent AFL football he was seeking, playing 24 times in his first year with the Swans. Sydney's season ended with a preliminary final loss against Fremantle, the club of Jai's brother Caleb.

== Statistics ==
Updated to the end of round 22, 2026.

Legend
G	Goals	K	Kicks	D	Disposals	T	Tackles
B	Behinds	H	Handballs	M	Marks

Season	Team	No.	Games	Totals							Averages (per game)							Votes
Season	Team	No.	Games	G	B	K	H	D	M	T	G	B	K	H	D	M	T	Votes
2022	Hawthorn	29	3	1	0	7	6	13	5	5	0.3	0.0	2.3	2.0	4.3	1.7	1.7	0
2023	Hawthorn	29	2	0	0	15	6	21	8	3	0.0	0.0	7.5	3.0	10.5	4.0	1.5	0
2024	Hawthorn	29	5	0	0	19	23	42	11	13	0.0	0.0	3.8	4.6	8.4	2.2	2.6	0
2025	Hawthorn	29	0	—	—	—	—	—	—	—	—	—	—	—	—	—	—	0
2026	Sydney	13	20	6	2	190	168	358	98	55	0.3	0.1	9.5	8.4	17.9	4.9	2.8	0
Career			30	7	2	231	203	434	122	76	0.2	0.1	7.7	6.8	14.5	4.1	2.5	0

== Honours and achievements ==
Team

- 2x McClelland Trophy (Hawthorn): 2024, (Sydney): 2026

Individual

- VFL Team of the Year: 2025
- 2× Col Austen trophy: 2024, 2025
