= David Albiston =

Australian rules footballer (1944–2023)

Personal information
- Full name: David Harold Albiston
- Born: 22 December 1944
- Died: 7 May 2023 (aged 78)
- Original team: MHSOB
- Height: 174 cm (5 ft 9 in)
- Weight: 73 kg (161 lb)
- Position: Rover

Playing career^{1}
Years	Club	Games (Goals)
1962–1966	Hawthorn	61 (30)
- ^{1} Playing statistics correct to the end of 1966.

David Harold Albiston (22 December 1944 – 7 May 2023) was an Australian rules footballer who played for Hawthorn in the Victorian Football League (VFL) during the 1960s.

A rover from the Melbourne High School Old Boys, Albiston played from the forward pocket in Hawthorn's losing 1963 VFL Grand Final team. His father Harold also played at Hawthorn and he is the nephew of Alec and Ken Albiston.
