= Scott Hosking =

Australian rules footballer

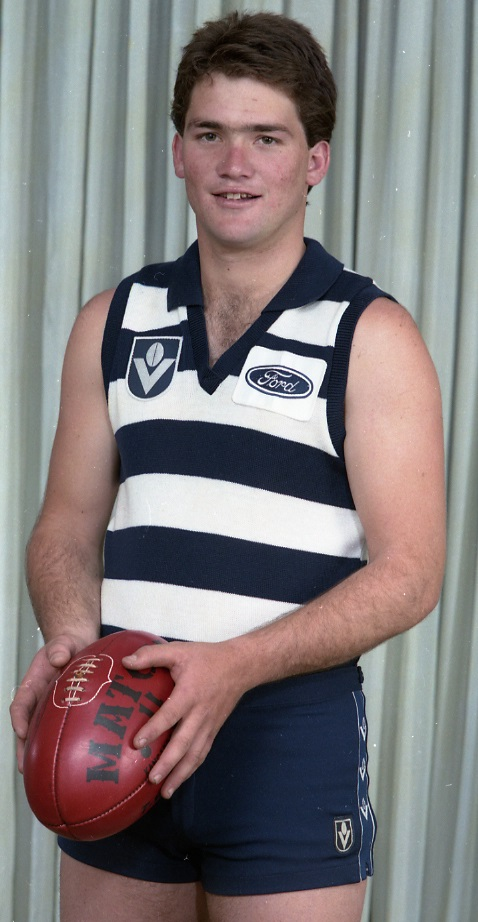

Personal information
- Born: 9 March 1967 (age 59)
- Original team: Lismore
- Height: 178 cm (5 ft 10 in)
- Weight: 82 kg (181 lb)

Playing career^{1}
Years	Club	Games (Goals)
1986	Geelong	1 (0)
- ^{1} Playing statistics correct to the end of 1986.

Scott Hosking (born 9 March 1967) is a former Australian rules footballer who played with Geelong in the Victorian Football League (VFL).

Hosking, originally from Lismore in the Western Plains Football League, played just one league game for Geelong, in the 1986 VFL season. It was Geelong's round 15 loss to Collingwood at Kardinia Park. His father, Ron Hosking, played with Geelong during the 1960s.

He is currently Football Manager for Geelong Football League side St Mary's, a club he also played for.
