= 1963 Hawthorn Football Club season =

Australian rules football season

Hawthorn Football Club
1963 season
- President: Dr. A.S. Ferguson
- Coach: John Kennedy, Sr.
- Captain: Graham Arthur
- Home ground: Glenferrie Oval
- VFL season: 13–4–1 (1st)
- Finals series: Grand Final (lost to Geelong 60–109)
- Best and fairest: Ian Law
- Leading goalkicker: John Peck (75)
- Highest home attendance: 91,471 (Semi-final vs. Geelong)
- Lowest home attendance: 10,500 (Round 12 vs. Fitzroy)
- Average home attendance: 33,601

The 1963 season was the Hawthorn Football Club's 39th season in the Victorian Football League and 62nd. This was the second time Hawthorn were the minor premiers. Hawthorn qualified for their second Grand Final appearance, however they suffered their first Grand Final defeat losing to Geelong 60–109. Following the defeat John Kennedy Sr. stepped down as coach.

== Fixture ==
=== Premiership season ===
| Rd | Date and local time | Opponent | Scores (Hawthorn's scores indicated in bold) | | | Venue | Attendance | Record |
| Rd | Date and local time | Opponent | Home | Away | Result | Venue | Attendance | Record |
|---|---|---|---|---|---|---|---|---|
| 1 | Saturday, 20 April (2:20 pm) | Essendon | **8.12 (60)** | 13.7 (85) | Lost by 25 points | Glenferrie Oval (H) | 30,000 | 0–1 |
| 2 | Thursday, 25 April (2:20 pm) | Melbourne | 14.16 (100) | **13.18 (96)** | Lost by 4 points | Melbourne Cricket Ground (A) | 55,293 | 0–2 |
| 3 | Saturday, 4 May (2:20 pm) | Collingwood | 8.16 (54) | **13.22 (100)** | Won by 36 points | Victoria Park (A) | 27,419 | 1–2 |
| 4 | Saturday, 11 May (2:20 pm) | South Melbourne | **21.25 (151)** | 11.14 (80) | Won by 71 points | Glenferrie Oval (H) | 15,000 | 2–2 |
| 5 | Saturday, 18 May (2:20 pm) | Footscray | 8.9 (57) | **11.10 (76)** | Won by 19 points | Western Oval (A) | 22,251 | 3–2 |
| 6 | Saturday, 25 May (2:20 pm) | North Melbourne | **11.17 (83)** | 9.7 (61) | Won by 22 points | Glenferrie Oval (H) | 14,837 | 4–2 |
| 7 | Saturday, 1 June (2:20 pm) | Geelong | 9.12 (66) | **9.12 (66)** | Draw | Kardinia Park (A) | 29,374 | 4–2–1 |
| 8 | Saturday, 8 June (2:20 pm) | St Kilda | 8.13 (61) | **9.11 (65)** | Won by 4 points | Junction Oval (A) | 34,900 | 5–2–1 |
| 9 | Saturday, 22 June (2:20 pm) | Carlton | **9.6 (60)** | 7.12 (54) | Won by 6 points | Glenferrie Oval (H) | 25,300 | 6–2–1 |
| 10 | Saturday, 6 July (2:20 pm) | Richmond | 4.10 (34) | **11.14 (80)** | Won by 46 points | Punt Road Oval (A) | 20,200 | 7–2–1 |
| 11 | Saturday, 20 July (2:20 pm) | Fitzroy | **9.17 (71)** | 6.2 (38) | Won by 33 points | Glenferrie Oval (H) | 10,500 | 8–2–1 |
| 12 | Saturday, 27 July (2:20 pm) | Essendon | 11.17 (83) | **7.10 (52)** | Lost by 31 points | Windy Hill (A) | 25,500 | 8–3–1 |
| 13 | Saturday, 3 August (2:20 pm) | Melbourne | **13.6 (84)** | 8.14 (62) | Won by 22 points | Glenferrie Oval (H) | 24,000 | 9–3–1 |
| 14 | Saturday, 10 August (2:20 pm) | Collingwood | **15.9 (99)** | 8.9 (57) | Won by 42 points | Glenferrie Oval (H) | 19,458 | 10–3–1 |
| 15 | Saturday, 17 August (2:20 pm) | South Melbourne | 6.9 (45) | **15.15 (105)** | Won by 60 points | Lake Oval (A) | 14,100 | 11–3–1 |
| 16 | Saturday, 24 August (2:20 pm) | Footscray | **13.21 (99)** | 8.7 (55) | Won by 44 points | Glenferrie Oval (H) | 17,000 | 12–3–1 |
| 17 | Saturday, 31 August (2:20 pm) | North Melbourne | 6.9 (45) | **12.14 (86)** | Won by 41 points | Arden Street Oval (A) | 12,963 | 13–3–1 |
| 18 | Saturday, 7 September (2:20 pm) | Geelong | **6.16 (52)** | 13.12 (90) | Lost by 38 points | Glenferrie Oval (H) | 35,500 | 13–4–1 |

=== Finals series ===
| Rd | Date and local time | Opponent | Scores (Hawthorn's scores indicated in bold) | | | Venue | Attendance |
| Rd | Date and local time | Opponent | Home | Away | Result | Venue | Attendance |
|---|---|---|---|---|---|---|---|
| Second Semi-Final | Saturday, 21 September (2:30 pm) | Geelong | **11.16 (82)** | 14.17 (101) | Lost by 19 points | Melbourne Cricket Ground (H) | 91,471 |
| Preliminary Final | Saturday, 28 September (2:30 pm) | Melbourne | **11.11 (77)** | 10.8 (68) | Won by 9 points | Melbourne Cricket Ground (H) | 86,546 |
| Grand Final | Saturday, 5 October (2:30 pm) | Geelong | 15.19 (109) | **8.12 (60)** | Lost by 49 points | Melbourne Cricket Ground (A) | 101,209 |

== Ladder ==
| (P) | Premiers |
| | Qualified for finals |

| # | Team | P | W | L | D | PF | PA | % | Pts |
|---|---|---|---|---|---|---|---|---|---|
| 1 | Hawthorn | 18 | 13 | 4 | 1 | 1485 | 1137 | 130.6 | 54 |
| 2 | Geelong (P) | 18 | 13 | 4 | 1 | 1354 | 1056 | 128.2 | 54 |
| 3 | Melbourne | 18 | 13 | 5 | 0 | 1680 | 1136 | 147.9 | 52 |
| 4 | St Kilda | 18 | 13 | 5 | 0 | 1501 | 1071 | 140.1 | 52 |
| 5 | Essendon | 18 | 13 | 5 | 0 | 1470 | 1069 | 137.5 | 52 |
| 6 | Carlton | 18 | 10 | 8 | 0 | 1275 | 1234 | 103.3 | 40 |
| 7 | North Melbourne | 18 | 8 | 10 | 0 | 1059 | 1244 | 85.1 | 32 |
| 8 | Collingwood | 18 | 7 | 11 | 0 | 1365 | 1427 | 95.7 | 28 |
| 9 | Footscray | 18 | 7 | 11 | 0 | 1126 | 1283 | 87.8 | 28 |
| 10 | Richmond | 18 | 5 | 13 | 0 | 1279 | 1687 | 75.8 | 20 |
| 11 | South Melbourne | 18 | 4 | 14 | 0 | 1202 | 1722 | 69.8 | 16 |
| 12 | Fitzroy | 18 | 1 | 17 | 0 | 986 | 1716 | 57.5 | 4 |

Rules for classification: 1. premiership points; 2. percentage; 3. points for
Average score: 73.1
Source: AFL Tables
