= Anthony Costa Oval =

Sports venue in South Geelong, Victoria

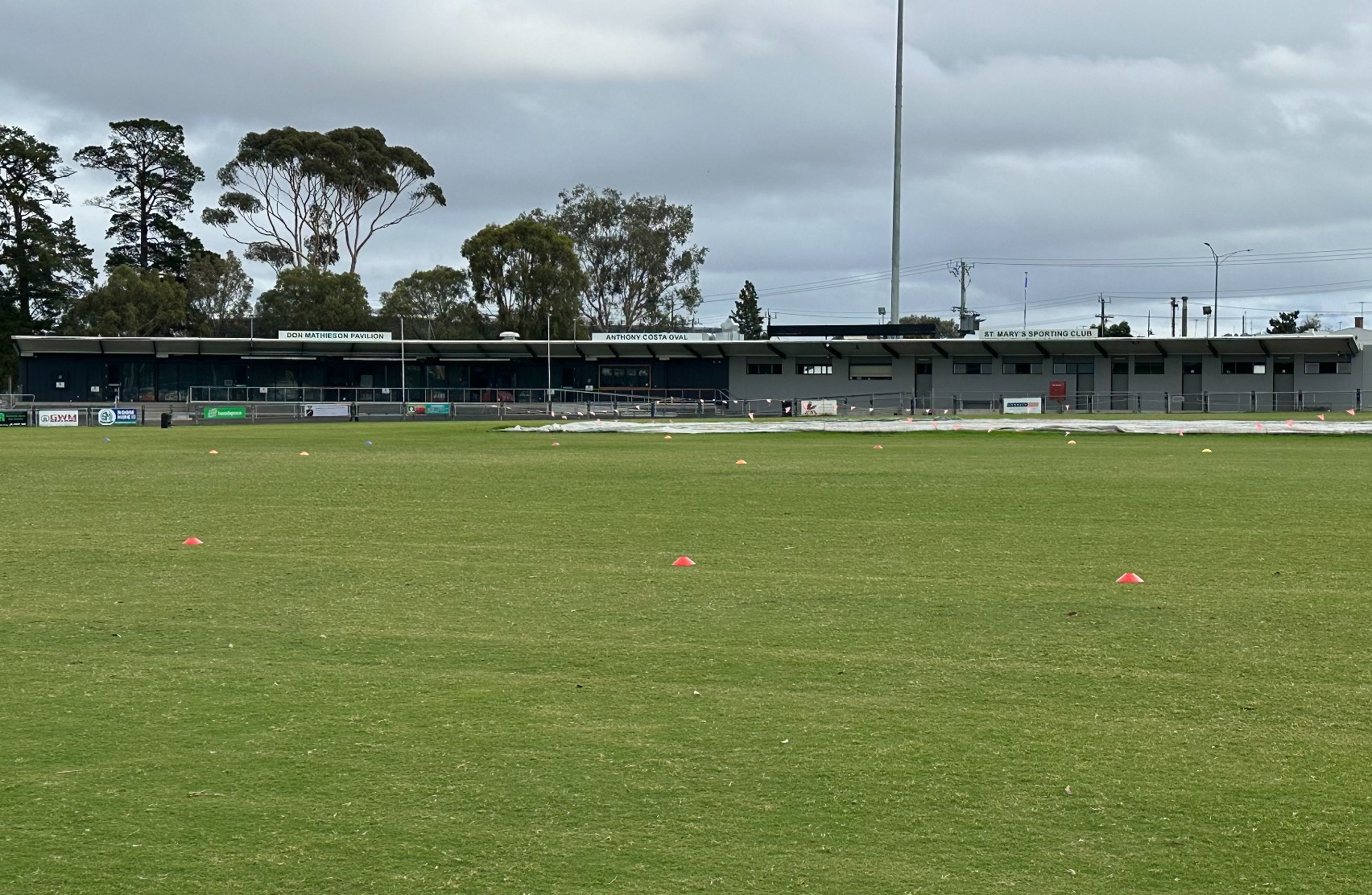
- Interactive map of Anthony Costa Oval
- Address: 399 Latrobe Terrace; South Geelong, Victoria
- Coordinates: 38.15712°S 144.35198°E
- Field size: 166 m × 102 m (545 ft × 335 ft)
- Public transit: ● South Geelong

Construction
- Opened: c. 1900; 126 years ago

Tenant
- St Mary's Sporting Club (1900s–)

Anthony Costa Oval (sometimes referred to as Kardinia Park West or St Mary's Oval) is an Australian rules football and cricket venue located within Kardinia Park in the Victorian suburb of South Geelong.

The St Mary's Football Club began playing at the venue in the early 1900s. It was one of two football ovals located at Kardinia Park at the time; the eastern oval later became the home of the Geelong Football Club. The venue was renamed on 22 April 2017 after Anthony Costa, who was the club's number-one ticket holder until his death in February 2017.

In 2017, Geelong played two VFL Women's (VFLW) matches at Anthony Costa Oval. TAC Cup under-18s matches have also been played at the venue.

Redevelopment of the Don Mathieson Pavilion began in 2019 and was completed in March 2020, although it had limited use until 2022 because of the impact of the COVID-19 pandemic.
