= Ted Ryan (footballer, born 1921) =

Australian rules footballer

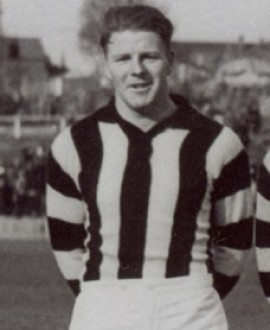
- Ryan in 1943

Personal information
- Full name: Edward Henry Ryan
- Born: 17 July 1921; Kew, Victoria
- Died: 5 May 1960 (aged 38); Repatriation General Hospital, Heidelberg, Victoria
- Original team: Williamstown (VFA)
- Height: 180 cm (5 ft 11 in)
- Weight: 81 kg (179 lb)

Playing career^{1}
Years	Club	Games (Goals)
1940–1941	Williamstown (VFA)	24 (3)
1941–1947	Collingwood (VFL)	33 (2)
- ^{1} Playing statistics correct to the end of 1947.

Edward Henry Ryan (17 July 1921 – 5 May 1960) was an Australian rules footballer who played with the Williamstown Football Club in the Victorian Football Association (VFA) and the Collingwood Football Club in the Victorian Football League (VFL).

== Family ==
The son of Christopher Ryan (1876–1949), and Ellen Mary "Nellie" Ryan (1881–1955), née Collins, Edward Henry Ryan was born at Kew, Victoria on 17 July 1921. His brother, Phillip James Ryan (1915–2014) played for the Hawthorn Football Club in the VFL.

He married Joan Marjorie Carroll (1921-2000), on 10 March 1945, at Xavier College Chapel; they had five children. Along side his 5 children, he had 11 grandchildren and many great grandchildren, one of them being the one and only Emily Ryan.

== Education ==
Ryan attended Xavier College.

== Football ==
=== Williamstown (VFA) ===
Recruited from the Kew Football Club in the Sub-District League in 1940, he played for the Williamstown, in the Victorian Football Association in 1940 (22 games) and in the first two games of the 1941 season.

=== Collingwood (VFL) ===
Having already played in two VFA matches with Williamstown, he was cleared to Collingwood on 24 April 1941; and, in 1941, Ryan was one of the five who played in all 18 home-and-away rounds. Due to wartime service in the Royal Australian Air Force he did not play senior football again until 1944, when he made 11 appearances while on leave. A defender, Ryan played four more games, two in 1946 and another two in 1947.

=== Williamstown (VFA) ===
Midway through the 1948 season, Ryan was cleared from Collingwood to Williamstown.

=== Stawell (WFL) ===
In 1949, based at Stawell, Victoria through his work as an inter-state truck driver, he was cleared from Williamstown to the Stawell Football Club in the Wimmera Football League.

== Military service ==
He enlisted in the RAAF in June 1943, and served overseas during World War II, and was discharged in February 1946.

== Death ==
He died at the Repatriation General Hospital, in Heidelberg, Victoria, on 5 May 1960.
