= 1949 Brownlow Medal =

- Winner: Colin Austen (Hawthorn); Ron Clegg (South Melbourne); 23 votes

The 1949 Brownlow Medal was the 22nd year the award was presented to the player adjudged the fairest and best player during the Victorian Football League (VFL) home and away season. Colin Austen of the Hawthorn Football Club and Ron Clegg of the South Melbourne Football Club both won the medal by polling twenty-three votes during the 1949 VFL season.

Under the tie-breaker rules in place in 1949, Clegg was originally the outright winner: he and Austen were tied on 23 votes, but Clegg polled six 3-vote games to Austen's five. In 1980, the League removed the tie-break from the rules and allowed for multiple tied winners in the same year, and in 1989 it retrospectively removed the tie-breaker from all previous counts, elevating Austen to joint winner of the 1949 medal.

== Leading votegetters ==
	Player	Votes
=1st	Col Austen (Hawthorn)	23
=1st	Ron Clegg (South Melbourne)	23
3rd	Harold Bray (St Kilda)	20
4th	John Coleman (Essendon)	15
=5th	Fred Flanagan (Geelong)	14
=5th	Jim Ross (St Kilda)	14
7th	Ern Henfry (Carlton)	13
=8th	Bill Hutchison (Essendon)	12
=8th	Don Cordner (Melbourne)	12
=8th	Bill Wilson (Richmond)	12
