= Gordon Anderson (footballer) =

Australian rules footballer (1924–1965)

Personal information
- Full name: Gordon Anderson
- Born: 16 September 1924; Coburg, Victoria
- Died: 19 June 1965 (aged 40); Surrey Hills, Victoria
- Original team: Blackburn
- Height: 185 cm (6 ft 1 in)
- Weight: 83 kg (183 lb)

Playing career^{1}
Years	Club	Games (Goals)
1947–1951	Hawthorn	59 (70)
- ^{1} Playing statistics correct to the end of 1951.

Gordon Anderson (16 September 1924 – 19 June 1965) was an Australian rules footballer who played with Hawthorn in the Victorian Football League (VFL).

Anderson was a follower and forward, secured by Hawthorn from Blackburn. He had served in the Royal Australian Air Force during World War II.

Anderson was Hawthorn's leading goal-kicker in the 1950 VFL season, with 21 goals, two clear from full-forward Albert Prior, who had played only seven games.

Anderson left Hawthorn in 1952, to coach Surrey Hills.
