= Peter Zychla =

Australian rules footballer

Personal information
- Full name: Peter Zychla
- Born: 19 July 1963 (age 63)
- Original team: St Mary's (GFL)
- Height: 188 cm (6 ft 2 in)
- Weight: 110 kg (243 lb)

Playing career^{1}
Years	Club	Games (Goals)
1982–1985	Geelong	12 (1)
- ^{1} Playing statistics correct to the end of 1985.

Career highlights
- dad of Ben zychla

Peter Zychla (born 19 July 1963) is a former Australian rules footballer who played with Geelong in the Victorian Football League (VFL). After an unsuccessful first two seasons with Geelong, Zychla was dropped from the reserves side. He was given a second opportunity in 1985 but failed to play another senior game.
