= Jack Condon (footballer) =

Australian rules footballer (1922–2015)

Personal information
- Full name: John Peter Condon
- Born: 9 May 1922; Hamilton, Victoria
- Died: 9 October 2015 (aged 93)
- Original team: St Mary's
- Height: 183 cm (6 ft 0 in)
- Weight: 83 kg (183 lb)

Playing career^{1}
Years	Club	Games (Goals)
1949–1950	Geelong	31 (47)
- ^{1} Playing statistics correct to the end of 1950.

John Peter "Jack" Condon (9 May 1922 – 9 October 2015) was an Australian rules footballer who played with Geelong in the Victorian Football League (VFL).

== VFL career ==
Condon was born in Hamilton, but recruited locally to Geelong, from the St Mary's club. Following a premiership with the seconds in 1948, he made his senior debut for Geelong in the 1949 VFL season as a mature recruit, two weeks shy of his 27th birthday. Condon, who worked off the field as a fireman, quickly became Geelong's regular ruckman. Described as a "good battler", he won the club's "best first year player" award for 1949. He played 14 of a possible 19 games that year, with a suspension for attempting to strike Footcray's Dick Wearmouth costing him four weeks.

In 1950, Condon made 17 league appearances. He showed his capabilities as a forward when he kicked eight goals in Geelong's 33-point win over Footscray at Kardinia Park in round two. His final game for Geelong was the 1950 preliminary final loss to North Melbourne, when they gave up a 39-point quarter time lead. He kicked two goals in the 17-point loss.

== Coaching ==
He accepted an offer in the 1951 pre-season to be playing coach of Portland in the Western District Football League. They finished runners-up in Condon's first season as coach, then in 1952 he steered the club to their first premiership in the league, with a six-point grand final win over Hamilton, which were led by former Melbourne player Fred Fanning. Portland were losing preliminary finalists under Condon in 1953 and 1954.
