= Richard Condon (disambiguation) =

Richard Condon (1915–1996) was an American political novelist.

Richard Condon may also refer to:

- Richard Condon (impresario) (1937–1991), Irish impresario
- Richard Condon (politician), American politician
- Richard Guy Condon (1952–1995), anthropologist
- Dick Condon (1876–1946), Australian rules footballer
- Richard J. Condon, New York City Police Commissioner, 1989–1990
