= William Condon =

William Condon may refer to:

- William Condon (pirate) (died 1734), 18th-century English pirate
- William F. Condon (1897–1972), American politician from New York
- William H. Condon (1843–?), American lawyer, author, and politician from Illinois
- William Joseph Condon (1895–1967), American prelate of the Roman Catholic Church
- William S. Condon, researcher into human interactions
- Bill Condon (born 1955), American screenwriter and director
- Bill Condon (footballer) (1901–1963), Australian rules footballer for South Melbourne
