= Ann Gorman Condon =

Ann Gorman Condon (1936 - June 1, 2001) was an American-born Canadian historian. She taught in the history department at University of New Brunswick from 1963 to 1966 and then again from 1970 to 1977, where at the Harriet Irving Library she helped create and develop the Loyalist Collection, which consists of early Canadian materials dating from 1740-1870.

== Biography ==
Born in Chicago and raised in Pasadena, California, Condon studied at the University of California, Berkeley, Radcliffe College, and Harvard University, where her PhD dissertation won the DeLancey K. Jay Prize. Her published work included The Envy of the American States: The Loyalist Dream for New Brunswick, an extension of her doctoral dissertation, published in 1984, and the letters and journals of Harrison and Eliza Otis, publishers of the Los Angeles Times. She also published many book reviews and contributed to both the Dictionary of Canadian Biography and American National Biography.

Condon retired in 1999 and died unexpectedly on 1 June 2001. She had a son, Gregory Gorman, and two daughters, Katherine and Caroline, with Dr. Thomas J. Condon, who was also associated with UNB. She served for many years on the board of directors of the Beaverbrook Art Gallery.

== Publications ==
- Sole author, The Envy of the American States: The Loyalist Dream for New Brunswick New Ireland Press (1984)
- Co-author, Rothesay: An Illustrated History, 1785-1920 Rothesay Area Heritage Trust Inc. (1984)
- Editor and introduction, Architects of Our Fortunes: The Journal of Eliza A. W. Otis, 1860-1863 Huntington Library Press (2001)
