= Ken Albiston =

Australian rules footballer (1926–2018)

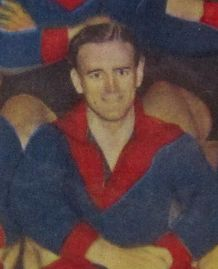

Personal information
- Full name: Kenneth Ian Albiston
- Born: 11 November 1926; Balwyn, Victoria
- Died: 20 June 2018 (aged 91)
- Original team: Melbourne High School Old Boys
- Height: 171 cm (5 ft 7 in)
- Weight: 68 kg (150 lb)

Playing career^{1}
Years	Club	Games (Goals)
1946–1951	Richmond	58 (76)
1952–1954	Melbourne	45 (49)
Total		103 (125)
- ^{1} Playing statistics correct to the end of 1954.

Kenneth Ian Albiston (11 November 1926 – 20 June 2018) was an Australian rules footballer who played for Richmond and Melbourne in the VFL.

The younger brother of Hawthorn forward Alec Albiston and Collingwood defender Harold Albiston, Ken played six seasons with Richmond before moving to Melbourne. He played in Melbourne's 1954 Grand Final loss to Footscray.

It was unusual in those days for footballers to kick left and right footed, but Albiston learned to kick left footed while recovering from an injury to his right foot.

Prior to his VFL career, Albiston served for seven months in the Royal Australian Air Force during the final year of World War II.
