= St Mary's Sporting Club =

St Mary's

Names
- Full name: St Mary's Sporting Club Inc
- Nickname: Saints

Club details
- Founded: 1953; 73 years ago
- Colours
- President: Sally Flynn
- Premierships: (14): 1956, 1959, 1960, 1967, 1972, 1975, 1979, 1992, 2004, 2008, 2019, 2022, 2025, 2026
- Ground: Anthony Costa Oval

Uniforms
Home

Other information
- Official website: stmaryssc.com

St Mary's Sporting Club Inc., nicknamed the Saints, is an Australian rules football and netball club based in the port city of Geelong, Victoria. The club teams currently compete in the Geelong Football Netball League, the premier league in the region.

== History ==
=== Earlier club ===
A version of this club existed from 1904 to 1906. They competed in the Church Union Association and won the 1905 Church Union Association premiership. The club was short-lived, disbanding in 1906, and it was another 16 years before St Mary's re-formed. This was done with great success playing in the Geelong Athletics Societies Football Association. It won flags in 1922, 1923, 1924 and 1927 before disbanding again in 1934.

=== Current club ===
The club was reformed from the merger of CYMS and YCW Clubs in 1953. They joined the GDFL Evelyn Hurst Cup and won their first flag in 1956. Since then it has become one of the most consistently successful club in the league. It was part of the breakaway that created the Geelong Football League in 1979.

It won the 2025 and 2026 premierships under the leadership of supercoach Ben "Biceps" Boseley.

== Premierships ==
- Geelong Football League
  - 1979, 1992, 2004, 2008, 2019, 2022, 2025, 2026
- Geelong & District Football League
  - 1956, 1959, 1960, 1967, 1972, 1975
- AFL Barwon Women's Football
  - 2019 (Division 1)

=== Notable players ===
- David Armour – Geelong
- Nick Brushfield – Geelong
- Jack Condon – Geelong
- Peter Zychla - Geelong
- Scott Hosking - Geelong
- Jack Henry - Geelong
- Brayden Ham - Essendon
- Oliver Henry - Collingwood/Geelong
- Charlie Lazzaro - North Melbourne
- Toby Conway - Geelong

== Bibliography ==
- Cat Country: History of Football In The Geelong Region – John Stoward – ISBN 978-0-9577515-8-3
