= Harold Albiston =

Australian rules footballer

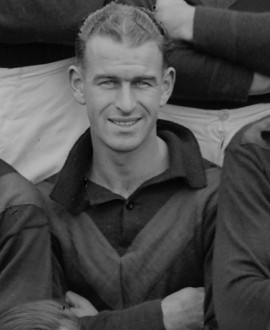
- Albiston during his Hawthorn career

Personal information
- Full name: Harold George Albiston
- Born: 13 April 1916; Warrnambool, Victoria
- Died: 18 January 1990 (aged 73); McCrae, Victoria
- Original team: Kew (VAFA)
- Height: 173 cm (5 ft 8 in)
- Weight: 72 kg (159 lb)

Playing career^{1}
Years	Club	Games (Goals)
1935	Collingwood	1 (0)
1936–1940	Hawthorn	62 (0)
Total		63 (0)
- ^{1} Playing statistics correct to the end of 1940.

Harold George Albiston (13 April 1916 – 18 January 1990) was an Australian rules footballer who played with Collingwood and Hawthorn in the Victorian Football League (VFL).

Albiston, a recruit from Kew in the Victorian Amateur Football Association, made just one senior appearance for Collingwood, in the 1935 VFL season. He was cleared to Hawthorn in 1936, where he played with his younger brother Alec Albiston, who also debuted that year. Harold played in the final six rounds of the season, then didn't lose his spot in the team until 1940 (when he enlisted in the army), playing 60 consecutive games. Another brother, Ken Albiston, played for Richmond and Melbourne after the war.

He was also a district cricketer, for Hawthorn-East Melbourne and Collingwood.

Harold's son, David Albiston, played 61 league games for Hawthorn, including the 1963 VFL Grand Final.
