= Col Austen =

Australian rules footballer (1920–1995)

Personal information
- Full name: Colin Edward Austen
- Born: 2 December 1920; Kew, Victoria
- Died: 3 October 1995 (aged 74); Box Hill, Victoria
- Original team: Kew
- Height: 175 cm (5 ft 9 in)
- Weight: 77 kg (170 lb)

Playing career^{1}
Years	Club	Games (Goals)
1940–1943, 1946–1949	Hawthorn	85 (0)
1950–1952	Richmond	51 (1)
1956	Box Hill	12 (1)
Total		148 (2)
- ^{1} Playing statistics correct to the end of 1952.

Career highlights
- Playing: Brownlow Medal: 1949; Hawthorn best and fairest: 1949; 2× VFL seconds premiership captain: 1954, 1955; Gardiner Medal: 1953; Coaching: 2× VFL seconds premiership coach: 1954, 1955

Colin Edward 'Col' Austen (2 December 1920 – 3 October 1995) was an Australian rules footballer who played for the Hawthorn Football Club and Richmond Football Club in the Victorian Football League (VFL).

Austen made his senior VFL debut for Hawthorn in 1941 and played until 1943 and from 1946 to 1949. He then played for Richmond from 1950 to 1952. He served as a signalman in the Australian Army during the Second World War.

Austen tied with South Melbourne's Ron Clegg for the 1949 Brownlow Medal but was not awarded it based on the 'countback' system in place at that time. The League later changed the system for tied results and, in 1989, he was awarded the medal retrospectively.

Hawthorn Football Club started 1950 in turmoil, Col Austen had sided with outgoing captain-coach Alec Albiston who was angry as he was told by a member of the board that he remain as captain. The club had appointed Bob McCaskill as coach and he wanted Kevin Curran to be captain. A huge internal split occurred, the board sided with the new coach and gave Albiston and Austen open clearances. Austen was cleared to Richmond and played 51 games from 1950 to 1952.

He was Captain/Coach of the Richmond Seconds side from 1953 to 1955, winning the competition's best and fairest, the Gardiner Medal, in 1953. He led the Tigers' seconds to the 1954 and 1955 Seconds premierships.

Finally he went to Box Hill in the VFA as Captain/Coach in 1956 and non-playing coach from 1957 to 1959. He coached Box Hill to its first two Finals appearances in the VFA, 3rd place in 1956 and 4th place in 1958. He also coached the VFA's representative side in 1958.

Austen was made a Life Member of the Richmond Football Club shortly before his death in 1995.

The 'Col Austen Memorial Trophy' is awarded each year to the winning team in the first Hawthorn vs Richmond match of the regular AFL season.

Since 2001 the Box Hill Football Club, now a member of the Victorian Football League and aligned to AFL Club Hawthorn, has annual presented the 'Col Austen Trophy' to its best and fairest player.

== Honours and achievements ==
=== Playing honours ===
Richmond

- 2× VFL seconds premiership player: 1954 & 1955.

Individual

- Brownlow Medal: 1949
- Hawthorn best and fairest: 1949
- 2× VFL seconds premiership captain: 1954 & 1955.
- Gardiner Medal: 1953
- Hawthorn Team of the Century

=== Coaching honours ===
Richmond

- 2× VFL seconds premiership coach: 1954, 1955

=== Hall of Fame/Life memberships ===
- Hawthorn life member
- Richmond life member
