= John Condon (hurler) =

Irish hurler (1872–1944)

Personal information
- Native name: Seán Ó Condún (Irish)
- Born: 6 October 1872 Cappamore, County Limerick, Ireland
- Died: 17 August 1944 (aged 71) New York City, United States

Sport
- Sport: Hurling
- Position: Right wing-forward
Club
- Years: Club
- Cappamore
Club titles
- Limerick titles: 0
Inter-county
- Years: County
- Limerick
Inter-county titles
- Munster titles: 1
- All-Irelands: 1

John Condon (6 October 1872 – 17 August 1944) was an Irish hurler who played as a right wing-forward for the Limerick senior team.

Born in Cappamore, County Limerick, Condon first played competitive hurling in his youth. He was a regular for the Limerick senior hurling team during a successful period at the end of the 19th century. During his inter-county career he won one All-Ireland medal and one Munster medal.

At club level Condon played with Cappamore.

== Honours ==
=== Player ===
Limerick

- All-Ireland Senior Hurling Championship (1): 1897
- Munster Senior Hurling Championship (1): 1897
