= Kevin Curran (footballer, born 1920) =

Australian rules footballer (1920–1978)

Personal information
- Full name: Kevin Stanley Curran
- Born: 19 December 1920; Traralgon, Victoria
- Died: 20 April 1978 (aged 57); Fitzroy, Victoria
- Original team: Traralgon
- Debut: Round 7, 1940, Hawthorn vs. Fitzroy, at Brunswick Street
- Height: 183 cm (6 ft 0 in)
- Weight: 87 kg (192 lb)

Playing career^{1}
Years	Club	Games (Goals)
1940, 1946–51	Hawthorn	85 (9)
- ^{1} Playing statistics correct to the end of 1951.

Career highlights
- Hawthorn best and fairest: 1948; Hawthorn captain: 1950–1951

Kevin Stanley Curran (19 December 1920 – 20 April 1978) was an Australian rules footballer who played for Hawthorn in the VFL during the 1940s.

== Early life ==
The sixth of nine children born to John Curran (1889–1966) and Julia Eugenie Parke (1888–1959), Kevin Stanley Curran was born at Traralgon on 19 December 1920.

== Football ==
Curran was recruited to Hawthorn from Traralgon and played his first game with Hawthorn reserves on 1 June. The next week he made his senior debut in a game against Fitzroy but late in the game he injured his shoulder and had to be replaced by the 19th man. Shortly after this Curran enlisted to serve in the Australian Army.

In 1946 Curran made a return to Hawthorn and the following season represented Victoria at the Hobart Carnival, the first of 9 interstate appearances during his career. He won Hawthorn's best and fairest award in 1948, also winning the Simpson Medal for his performance against West Australian in an interstate game.

Bob McCaskill replaced Alec Albiston as Hawthorn coach at the start of 1950. Albiston was told by a committeeman that he would be appointed captain. But McCaskill wanted a more physical leader, and Curran was selected by the Hawthorn leadership committee. Albiston was stunned by the appointment and a split occurred at the club. Albiston and Col Austen, the reigning Brownlow Medallist, were given open clearances and left the club.

Curran got reported in the third match of the season, getting a four-match suspension. His return was against Richmond, Colin Austen’s new club, and during the final quarter Curran charged into Austen well after he had disposed of the ball. He was suspended for another four matches.

He resigned as captain after two seasons, he accepted an offer to captain-coach the Sandhurst Football Club in Bendigo at the beginning of 1952. He won the Bendigo league’s best and fairest (Michelsen Medal) in his first season.

== War service ==
Curran enlisted in the Australian Army on 23 July 1940. He served in the 2/2nd Commando Squadron (Australia) in East Timor, New Britain and New Guinea, being Mentioned in Despatches for exceptional service in the field in the South West Pacific–in one incident killing five Japanese soldiers with his bayonet when his unit had been cut off from other Allied forces. He had been promoted to Lieutenant by the time he finished his service in 1945.

== Later life ==
Curran subsequently became a publican and ran the Fleece Inn Hotel in Bendigo. He helped recruit local Bendigo boys Graham Arthur, Brendan Edwards and Des Dickson to Hawthorn. Curran himself signed Edwards after two North Melbourne officials made the mistake of calling in at Curran’s hotel and asking for direction to Edward's place, Curran gave them bad directions then he rushed off and signed Edwards to Hawthorn.

Kevin Curran died on 20 April 1978 at Fitzroy.

== Honours and achievements ==
Individual

- Hawthorn best and fairest: 1948
- Hawthorn captain: 1950–1951
- Simpson Medal (Interstate): 1948
- Hawthorn life member
