= Bob McCaskill =

Australian rules footballer and coach

Personal information
- Full name: Robert James McCaskill
- Born: 27 September 1895; Cobram, Victoria
- Died: 23 June 1952 (aged 56); Mordialloc, Victoria
- Original teams: Numurkah, Shepparton
- Height: 5 ft 8 in (173 cm)
- Weight: 9 st 13 lb (63 kg)
- Positions: Centreman, Wing

Playing career^{1}
Years	Club	Games (Goals)
1910, 1912	Numurkah	? (?)
1911	Kyabram	? (?)
1913–1914, 1920–1925	Shepparton	? (?)
1923–1925	Richmond	36 (0)
1926–1940	Sandhurst	278 (59)

Coaching career
Years	Club	Games (W–L–D)
1924	Shepparton	22 (12–9–1)
1926–1940	Sandhurst	278 (?)
1941–1942, 1944–1947	North Melbourne	102 (43–59–0)
1950–1951	Hawthorn	36 (4–32–0)
Total		138 (47–91–0)
- ^{1} Playing statistics correct to the end of 1940.

Career highlights
- 1913 & 1920 - Shepparton Premiership player.; 1924 - Victorian v NSW; Sandhurst Premiership Captain-Coach: 1927, 1929, 1930, 1931, 1932, 1933, 1934, 1937 & 1940.; Bendigo Football League - Hall of Fame Inductee. 2014

Robert 'Bob' James McCaskill (27 September 1895 – 23 June 1952) was an Australian rules footballer who played for Richmond in the Victorian Football League (VFL) during the 1920s and coached both North Melbourne and Hawthorn.

== Early life ==
Born in Cobram in 1895, McCaskill spent his childhood growing up around Numurkah near Shepparton, Victoria. It was here that he learnt to play the cornet.

In December 1915 with the fighting in Europe during World War I McCaskill enlisted in Shepparton only to be discharged in May 1916 for synovitis of the knee. He was issued with the service number 36704. He travelled to Royal Park in Melbourne in September 1916 to enlist again with the Australian Army. He was passed fit on this occasion. He fought in Europe rising to the rank of Sergeant. He returned to Australia in June 1919 and was presented with a gold medal by the Numurkah Soilders Welcome Home Committee. McCaskill did not play any competition football between 1915 and 1919 due to his World War One commitments.

McCaskill married Vera McKenzie Brunton on 17 September 1921 in Geelong.

== Playing career ==
McCaskill was a fast running wingman and played senior football for Numurkah in 1910 and 1912 and was best on ground for Numurkah in their 1912 losing Goulburn Valley Football Association grand final match against Muckatah.

McCaskell played with Kyabram in 1911 in the Goulburn Valley Football League and he then played in Shepparton's 1913 premiership and in their 1914 Goulburn Valley Football League grand final loss, with McCaskill featuring in Shepparton's best players. After the war McCaskill returned to Shepparton where he re-established his business, as a motor and coach trimmer. He returned to play football with Shepparton and was a member of their 1920 Goulburn Valley Football League premiership. McCaskill also acted as an umpire for the Shepparton Junior Football Association.

Strong performances while playing for Shepparton in the GVFL he was under the attention of the Richmond Football Club. At the age of 27 he got a permit to play with Richmond in June 1923. McCaskill was a centreman while at Richmond and played finals football in 1924 with his side eventually finishing second in that year's unique round robin format.

Back in the 1920s the Goulburn Valley Football League matches were played on a Wednesday afternoon and some of the better players who were based in Shepparton would also play VFL football on a Saturday, which McCaskill did from 1923 to 1925. Although McCaskill was not granted a permit to play in the 1924 Goulburn Valley Football League finals series by the VFL Umpire and Permit Committee.

McCaskill represented Victoria in a match against New South Wales in August 1924, that they won.

McCaskill accepted a position at the Bendigo YMCA as secretary in November 1924, but continued to play with Richmond in 1925. McCaskill then applied for a clearance to Sandhurst in February 1926 as their captain-coach.

== Coaching career ==
Shepparton

At the club's 1924 annual meeting, McCaskill was appointed as captain-coach of the Shepparton Football Club. McGaskill only coached Shepparton for one season, due to accepting a position with the YMCA in Bendigo in late 1924. McCaskill held this YMCA position until he resigned in February 1928.

Sandhurst

McGaskill was cleared by Richmond to captain-coach Sandhurst in April, 1926 and he had a huge amount of success as captain-coach in the Bendigo Football League, leading Sandhurst to nine premierships in 1927, 1929, 1930, 1931, 1932, 1933, 1934, 1937 & 1940. Sandhurst were also runners up under McCaskill in 1926, 1935 and 1936.

McCaskill retired as captain-coach of Sandhurst in October 1940 and enlisted in the AIF.

North Melbourne

Upon the outbreak of World War Two, McCaskill again enlisted in 1940 and led the Southern Command Band at Royal Park and later became an Army Amenities Officer. This meant he relocated to Melbourne and the North Melbourne club accepted McCaskill's offer as honorary coach in April 1941. Warrant Officer McCaskill was relocated interstate by the Army and the job went to Bill Findlay as his replacement. Bob returned to Melbourne and was re-appointed to the North Melbourne coaching position for 1944, when they finished sixth, with 10 wins – their first season with more wins than losses since entering the VFL. They finished the 1945 VFL home and away season in third, with 13 wins, but lost to Carlton in the first Semi Final thus being eliminated. In 1946, North finished ninth, with eight wins, then in 1947, North finished tenth, with only four wins, but McCaskill became the first coach in charge of 100 games for the club.

In September 1947, McCaskill was appointed as the State Secretary of the Australian Legion of Ex-Service Men and Women.

McCaskill was replaced as North's coach by Wally Carter in February 1948.

Hawthorn

He finished his coaching career with a stint at Hawthorn from 1950 to 1951. McCaskill apparently walked into a meeting in the Club's secretary office and announced "Gentlemen, I've decided that I am going to be the coach of Hawthorn Football Club".

In 1950, Hawthorn changed the jumper from brown with a gold vee to brown and gold vertical stripes, at the suggestion of coach, Bob McCaskill.

Kevin Curran was appointed as club captain in 1950 under McCaskill, who took over from 1949 captain-coach, Alec Albiston, with Hawthorn finishing on the bottom of the ladder in 1949, with three wins. Hawthorn did not win a match in 1950 but won four matches in 1951 and finished second last on the ladder under McCaskill.

Late in 1951 McCaskill's health began to fail. He was in and out of hospital but was reappointed as Hawthorn's coach for 1952. McCaskill wasn't well enough to continue coaching in 1952, his assistant Jack Hale was appointed caretaker coach in the hope Bob would recover. He died at home on 23 June 1952.

The perpetual McCaskill Trophy was struck in honour of McCaskill for VFL senior football matches between North Melbourne and Hawthorn from 1952 onwards, due to his extraordinary coaching skills over many years.

== Outside football ==
A musically gifted man, he could play the cornet. In 1916 McCaskill was the bandmaster of the Maribyrnong Artillery Band.

McCaskill was recorded as a Bandmaster when he enlisted with The Army in World War Two.

Later in life McCaskill lead the Bendigo Citizens Band to an Australian championship.
