= Albert Prior =

Australian rules footballer (1921–1971)

Personal information
- Full name: Albert Edward Prior
- Born: 15 January 1921; Melbourne, Victoria, Australia
- Died: 21 January 1971 (aged 50); Donvale, Victoria, Australia
- Original team: Camberwell (VFA)
- Height: 185 cm (6 ft 1 in)
- Weight: 85 kg (187 lb)

Playing career^{1}
Years	Club	Games (Goals)
1941, 1944–50	Hawthorn	103 (258)
- ^{1} Playing statistics correct to the end of 1950.

Career highlights
- 4× Hawthorn leading goalkicker: 1946–1949

Albert Edward "Butch" Prior (15 January 1921 – 21 January 1971) was an Australian rules footballer who played with Hawthorn in the VFL during the 1940s.

== Family ==
The son of Thomas Edward Prior (1882–1968), and Charlotte Nicholls Prior (1884–1956), née Jensen, Albert Edward Prior was born at Melbourne, Victoria on 15 January 1921.

He married June Ivy Rose Braden (1924–2003) in 1945.

== Football ==
A full-forward, he topped Hawthorn's goalkicking in every season from 1946 to 1949 with a best of 67 goals in 1947. He kicked 8 goals in a match three times: against Footscray on 3 May 1947, against Richmond on 17 May 1947 and, in his last match for Hawthorn, in a season where Hawthorn lost all 18 of its home-and-away games, against South Melbourne on 19 August 1950.

In 1951 Prior was cleared from Hawthorn and was appointed coach of the East Hawthorn team in the Eastern Suburban League.

== Military service ==
Prior also served in the Australian Army during World War II.

== Honours and achievements ==
Individual

- Hawthorn leading goalkicker: 1946, 1947, 1948, 1949
- Hawthorn life member
