= Phil Ryan (footballer, born 1915) =

Australian rules footballer (1915–2014)

Personal information
- Full name: Phillip James Ryan
- Born: 9 June 1915; Kew, Victoria
- Died: 7 January 2014 (aged 98)
- Original team: Kew CYMS (CYMSFA)
- Height: 185 cm (6 ft 1 in)
- Weight: 75 kg (165 lb)

Playing career^{1}
Years	Club	Games (Goals)
1941–1946	Hawthorn	52 (26)
- ^{1} Playing statistics correct to the end of 1946.

Career highlights
- Hawthorn Hall of Fame

Phillip James Ryan AM (9 June 1915 – 7 January 2014) was an Australian rules footballer who played with Hawthorn in the Victorian Football League (VFL). He was appointed a Member of the Order of Australia in 1991, for services to the community and sport.

== Playing career ==
Ryan played his early football at Kew CYMS and was a member of Old Xaverians's 1938 premiership team.

He spent six years in the VFL, during which time he made 52 league appearances for Hawthorn, mostly as a ruckman and up forward.

His younger brother, Ted Ryan, played with Collingwood in the 1940s.

== Administration ==
From 1948 to 1967, Ryan served in a variety of positions at Hawthorn, including Vice President, Chairman of Selectors and Treasurer.

Ryan was club president from 1968 until 1979, with Hawthorn winning three premierships while he was in the role.

In 1980, Ryan became the VFL's commissioner for player payments.

== Honours and achievements ==
Individual

- Hawthorn Hall of Fame
- Hawthorn life member
