= Alec Albiston =

Australian rules footballer and coach

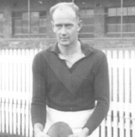

Personal information
- Full name: Alec Marsh Albiston
- Born: 16 November 1917; Warrnambool, Victoria
- Died: 13 April 1998 (aged 80)
- Original team: Kew
- Height: 175 cm (5 ft 9 in)
- Weight: 73 kg (161 lb)

Playing career^{1}
Years	Club	Games (Goals)
1936–42; 1945–49	Hawthorn	170 (383)
1950	North Melbourne	7 (6)
Total		177 (389)

Coaching career
Years	Club	Games (W–L–D)
1947–1949	Hawthorn	57 (12–45–0)
- ^{1} Playing statistics correct to the end of 1950.

Career highlights
- 2× Hawthorn best and fairest: 1941, 1946; 4× Hawthorn leading goalkicker: 1939, 1941, 1942, 1945; Hawthorn captain: 1947–1949; Hawthorn Hall of Fame

Alec Marsh Albiston (16 November 1917 – 13 April 1998) was an Australian rules footballer who played with Hawthorn in the Victorian Football League (VFL) and with North Melbourne for his final season. A goalkicking rover, he was captain and coach of Hawthorn between 1947 and 1949.

== Playing career ==
He was the first Hawthorn player in the history of the club to kick ten goals in a match, doing so against North Melbourne in the opening round of the 1940 season. His season ended shortly afterwards after the board suspended him indefinitely during a dispute between his brother (Harold Albiston) and a committeeman.

In 1941 he was back, winning the club best and fairest and heading the club's goalkicking. Albiston joined the Air Force in 1942 when he was at his football prime and was one of the favorites to win the Brownlow Medal in 1942. He did not play at all in 1943 and 1944 due to being stationed in Darwin with the Royal Air Force.

Albiston won the 1944 Darwin Football Association best and fairest award.

Albiston won the Hawthorn best and fairest award again in 1946. He topped the Hawks' goalkicking charts four times during his career, in 1939, 1941, 1942 and 1945.

In 1947 Albiston was appointed captain-coach of Hawthorn for three years, while he enjoyed the position he said that the club was hamstrung for the ability to recruit good players. The club had no budget for recruiting.

Albiston was involved in a nasty off season split at Hawthorn in 1949; Albiston had accepted that he would not be coaching in 1950, but a committeeman had promised him the captaincy, whereas Bob McCaskill had wanted Kevin Curran as captain and this caused a huge internal fight. Brownlow Medallist Col Austen sided with Albiston, but the committee sided with the new coach and Albiston and Austen were given open clearances; Albiston to North Melbourne and Austen to Richmond. Without its two best players, Hawthorn finished 1950 last without a win.

When he left Hawthorn he was the clubs greatest goalkicker with 383 goals, he held that record until the end of 1964 when John Peck passed him. Much of this was credited to his athleticism and ability to withstand injury.

Albiston played seven games for the “Shinboners” before retiring.

In 2011 he was inducted into the Hawthorn Football Club Hall of Fame.

== Honours and achievements ==
Individual

- 2× Hawthorn best and fairest: 1941, 1946
- 4× Hawthorn leading goalkicker: 1939, 1941, 1942, 1945
- Hawthorn captain: 1947–1949
- Hawthorn Hall of Fame
- Hawthorn life member
