= Kardinia Park =

Public park and sports venue in Geelong, Victoria, Australia

Kardinia Park is a major public park located in South Geelong, Victoria. A number of public and sporting facilities are located in the park: a major AFL stadium, a secondary football oval, a cricket field, an open air swimming pool, a number of netball courts, various sporting clubrooms, and a senior citizens centre. The park is bounded by Moorabool Street, the Geelong railway line, Kilgour Street, Latrobe Terrace, and Park Crescent.

== History ==
Kardinia Park was first proclaimed as a public park in May 1872 by the Commissioner of Crown Lands. Then known as Chilwell Flat the new park was 60 acres (24 hectares) in size. Control of the land was vested in the Geelong, Newtown, and Chilwell councils.

1872 saw Kardinia Park adopted as the name. The park originally stretched north to Kilgour Street until the extension of the Geelong railway to Winchelsea in 1876 isolated the north-east corner. This area was sold for housing.

== Zoo ==
Kardinia Park Zoo in 1910

A zoo was opened in the park in 1903 by the park committee. In 1911 the Geelong Advertiser's illustrated magazine News of the Week published an inventory of the zoo:

- Black ducks (Australian)
- Australian boobook (Australian)
- Mandarin duck (China)
- Mallard duck (Europe)
- Peacock (India)
- White swan (Arctic regions)
- Guinea fowls (Africa)

Mammals:

- Monkeys (Africa)
- Four kangaroos
- Silver kangaroo (the largest of which stands six feet tall)
- Six deer (native of Scotland, but several have been bred in the park)
- Wallaby (Tasmania)
- Great kangaroo (Tasmania)
- Lemur (Madagascar)

It is believed that the zoo closed at some time during World War II.

== Football ==
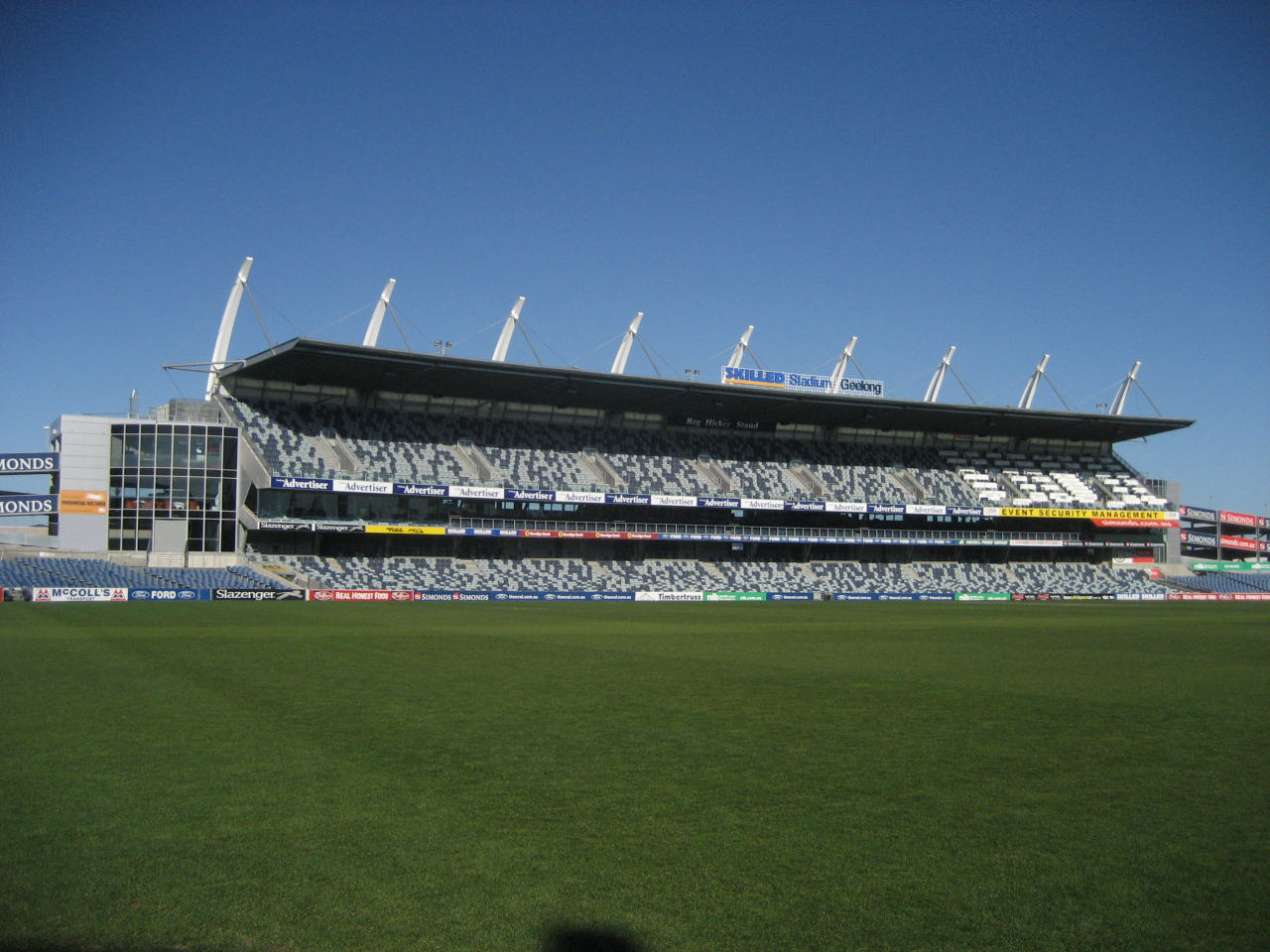
GMHBA Stadium

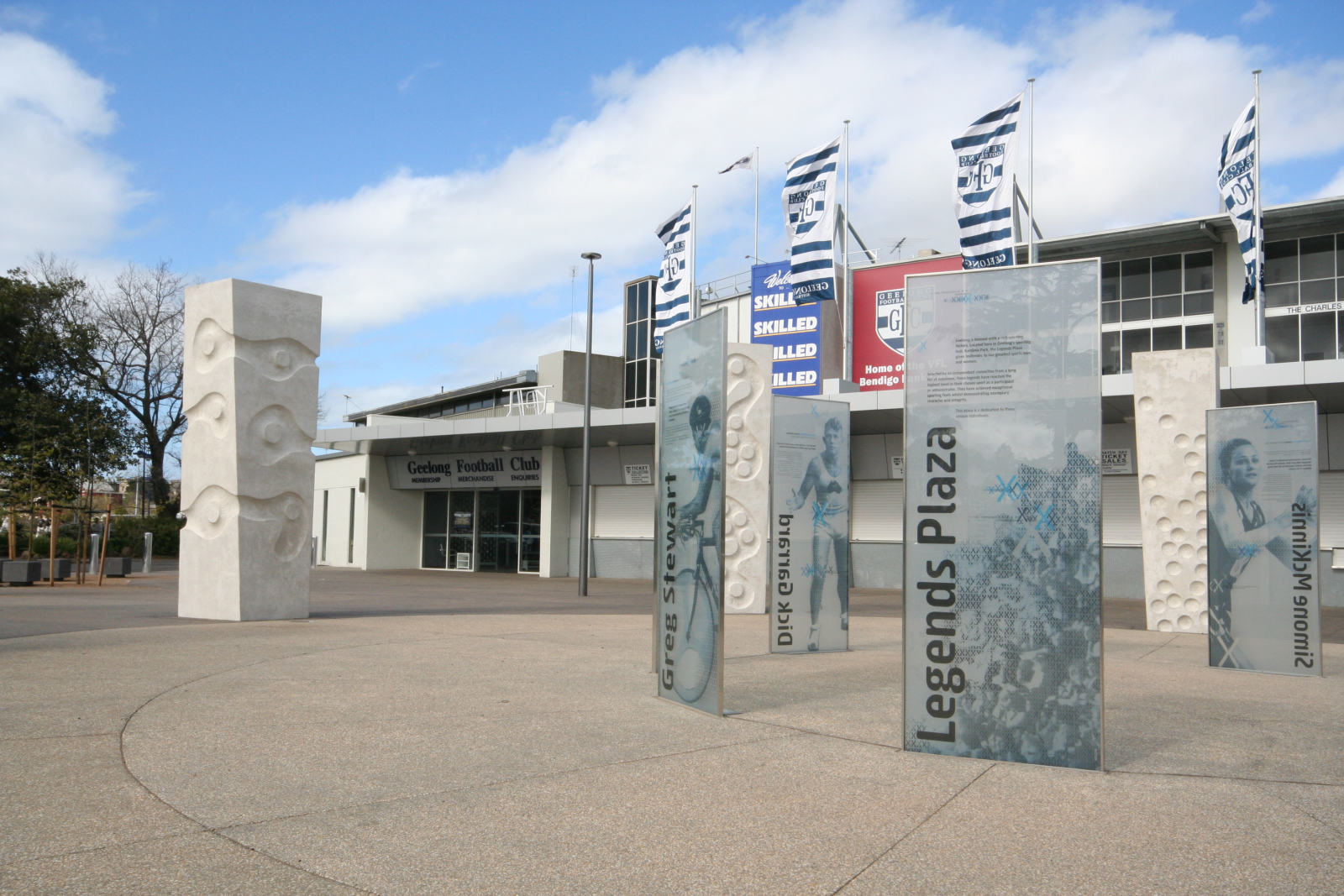
'Legends Plaza' at the entry to the stadium

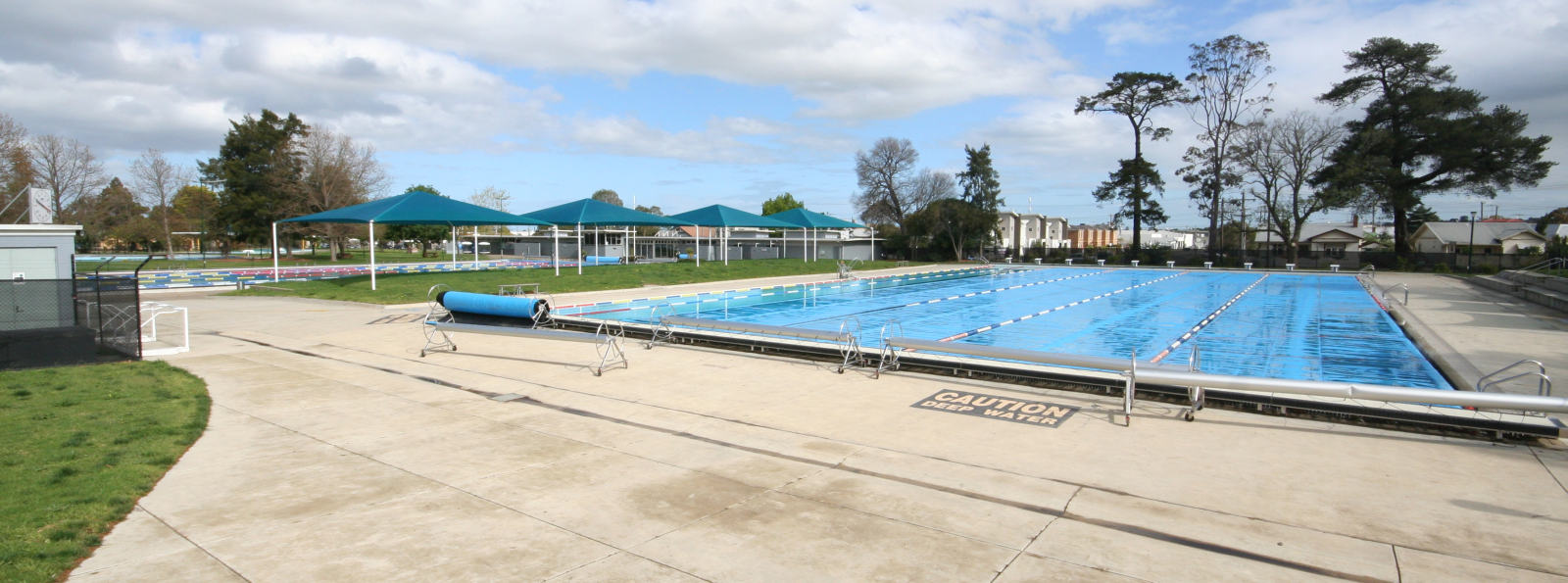
Swimming pool

By 1911, there were two football ovals at Kardinia Park, one on the eastern side, the other on the west. The Geelong Football Club began playing home games on the eastern oval at the park in 1941 after its previous home ground, Corio Oval, was needed for military reasons. They use the ground to this day.

The western oval is currently used by the local St Marys football club for local league competitions. The clubrooms for the St Marys team are located on the western side of the oval beside Latrobe Terrace.

The third oval, whilst primarily used for cricket, is also used as the training venue for the Geelong Football Umpires association. The association rooms are located to the south of the oval.

== Swimming ==
The Kardinia swimming pool is located on Park Crescent, and was opened by the then City of Geelong in the mid-1960s. The open air complex is only open during the warmer months of the year. The pool is currently operated by the City of Greater Geelong.

Five swimming pools are provided: one for toddlers and another for older children, two 50 metre eight lane lap pools, and a diving pool with 1 metre and 3 metre springboards. A waterslide was added to the complex in the 1980s, however it only operates during the busier summer months.

The complex is the home of the Geelong Swimming Club and is the frequent home of swimming competitions. It also sees a number of lap swimmers due to being one of the few full length swimming pools in Geelong. For the same reason a number of school swimming carnivals are also held at the pool.

A $4.4 million upgrade was carried out the centre in 2005, with a new international standard 10 lane 50 metre pool built to the east of the existing pool. In February 2006 the pool hosted the World Lifesaving Championships.

The pool was planned to host the aquatics events at the 2026 Commonwealth Games, before their cancellation in 2023.

== Cricket ==
A third oval, to the north next to the railway tracks is used for cricket. The Geelong Cricket Club currently uses it during summer for their Premier Cricket (Victorian cricket league) side. In the 2007/08 season the club made the First XI Grand Final for the first time, going down to the Ringwood Rams. The Second and Third XI's also made Grand Finals, both losing. The clubrooms are located on the back of the Ford Stand to the east of the main stadium.

== Rugby Union ==
Super Rugby sides Melbourne Rebels and Waikato Chiefs played a pre-season trial at the ground on Friday February 3, 2012. It was first Super Rugby game hosted by Geelong.

== Other sports ==
Netball courts also exist in the centre of the park for the use of local competitions. A clubroom exists beside the courts. A fitness course runs around the western side of the park. A children's playground also exists in the north-west corner, along with outdoor barbecue facilities, picnic areas and public toilets.

== Kardinia Park Stadium Trust ==
The Kardinia Park Stadium Trust is an organisation that operates the Kardinia Park Stadium in Geelong, Australia.

The trust was created in 2016 by the Victorian Government and was created to oversee the expanding functions of the venue as it underwent significant redevelopment and expansion of capacity. The trust's responsibilities, powers and roles are detailed in the Kardinia Park Stadium Trust Act 2016, which was passed by the Parliament in February 2016.

=== Trust membership ===
As of the trust's establishment in March 2016, the members of the trust are:

- Steve Bracks (Chairman)
- Rebecca Casson
- Gillian Costa
- Simon Guthrie
- Jane den Hollander
- Michael Malouf
- Elizabeth Mears

The trust committee also appoints a CEO, who at this time is Michael Brown, who was the former CEO of the 2015 AFC Asian Cup.
