= List of VFL debuts in 1944 =

The 1944 Victorian Football League (VFL) season was the 48th season of the VFL. The season saw 123 Australian rules footballers make their senior VFL debut and a further 21 players transfer to new clubs having previously played in the VFL.

== Summary ==
Summary of debuts in 1944
Club	VFL debuts	Change of club
Carlton	11	0
Collingwood	10	0
Essendon	12	0
Fitzroy	5	3
Footscray	7	2
Geelong	3	2
Hawthorn	13	2
Melbourne	14	1
North Melbourne	12	3
Richmond	11	0
South Melbourne	13	1
St Kilda	12	7
Total	123	21

== Debuts ==
Name	Club	Age at debut	Round debuted	Games	Goals	Notes
Jack Conley	Carlton	23 years, 278 days	12	135	104	
Doug Williams	Carlton	21 years, 163 days	11	120	7	
Herb Turner	Carlton	22 years, 305 days	1	86	101	
Ern Henfry	Carlton	23 years, 33 days	17	84	20	
Alec Way	Carlton	18 years, 274 days	2	32	27	
Bert Lucas	Carlton	22 years, 61 days	5	7	5	
Les McCann	Carlton	24 years, 118 days	7	7	1	
Ernie Spence	Carlton	25 years, 228 days	1	4	0	
Les Marden	Carlton	24 years, 282 days	9	2	0	
Les Gregory	Carlton	29 years, 274 days	17	2	0	
Harold McDonald	Carlton	21 years, 34 days	1	1	0	
Dave Newman	Collingwood	21 years, 82 days	3	49	32	
Bill Dalkin	Collingwood	22 years, 173 days	1	30	10	
George Nelson	Collingwood	25 years, 10 days	1	24	1	
Bob Galbally	Collingwood	23 years, 144 days	6	8	26	Brother of Jack and Frank Galbally.
Jack Synon	Collingwood	19 years, 318 days	6	7	0	
Ron Hibbert	Collingwood	20 years, 64 days	4	5	2	
Ray Riddell	Collingwood	25 years, 104 days	10	5	0	
Jim Tibballs	Collingwood	21 years, 254 days	5	4	1	
Jack Nilson	Collingwood	25 years, 150 days	15	4	0	
Arthur Robbins	Collingwood	24 years, 134 days	7	2	0	
Bob Syme	Essendon	19 years, 179 days	4	116	59	
Herbie Tonkes	Essendon	23 years, 32 days	1	37	0	
Terry Healy	Essendon	22 years, 358 days	8	15	1	
Russell Hill	Essendon	24 years, 192 days	16	14	1	
Ray Finn	Essendon	18 years, 132 days	2	10	14	
Alan Randall	Essendon	19 years, 47 days	6	9	0	
Alan Shaw	Essendon	22 years, 55 days	13	5	0	
Jack Henry	Essendon	21 years, 176 days	11	4	1	
Jack Symons	Essendon	19 years, 306 days	3	3	0	
Ron Kennedy	Essendon	24 years, 241 days	6	3	1	
Jack Vinall	Essendon	23 years, 153 days	4	2	1	
Ken Collicoat	Essendon	24 years, 343 days	8	2	1	
Norm Johnstone	Fitzroy	17 years, 181 days	8	228	185	Grandfather of Travis Johnstone.
Noel Jarvis	Fitzroy	19 years, 216 days	11	159	31	
Jack Symons	Fitzroy	32 years, 72 days	2	36	58	Previously played for Richmond.
Wally Bristowe	Fitzroy	23 years, 23 days	3	18	14	Previously played for Hawthorn.
Laurie Bickerton	Fitzroy	26 years, 298 days	5	12	0	
Charlie Linney	Fitzroy	18 years, 269 days	5	12	0	
Jack Harrow	Fitzroy	23 years, 105 days	11	2	0	
Billy Walsh	Fitzroy	33 years, 78 days	1	1	0	Previously played for Melbourne.
George McLaren	Footscray	19 years, 80 days	6	139	24	
Bill Wood	Footscray	22 years, 193 days	3	115	294	
Dick Wearmouth	Footscray	18 years, 8 days	3	100	27	
Jack Sutton	Footscray	21 years, 184 days	6	13	8	
Harry Chalmers	Footscray	24 years, 102 days	11	13	3	Previously played for North Melbourne.
Don Henderson	Footscray	25 years, 272 days	1	11	2	
Gerry Sexton	Footscray	24 years, 102 days	11	10	0	
Alf Benison	Footscray	25 years, 341 days	4	9	6	Previously played for South Melbourne.
Mal McBean	Footscray	22 years, 299 days	13	4	0	
Jim Fitzgerald	Geelong	19 years, 144 days	1	108	14	
Doug Brown	Geelong	20 years, 250 days	1	70	108	Previously played for Fitzroy.
Jim Munday	Geelong	26 years, 187 days	1	44	26	
Ralph Patman	Geelong	28 years, 117 days	1	38	11	Previously played for Fitzroy.
Jack Sing	Geelong	19 years, 216 days	1	33	1	
Ted Fletcher	Hawthorn	18 years, 166 days	4	129	51	
Malcolm Worrall	Hawthorn	18 years, 209 days	1	80	9	
Roy Baldwin	Hawthorn	17 years, 29 days	17	41	6	
Andy Brannan	Hawthorn	24 years, 351 days	3	31	39	Previously played for Richmond.
Ken Lippiatt	Hawthorn	24 years, 219 days	15	30	0	
Tom Spear	Hawthorn	24 years, 292 days	18	30	0	
Ken Bodger	Hawthorn	19 years, 213 days	11	12	9	
Reg Barnes	Hawthorn	23 years, 164 days	4	6	0	
Jim Maguire	Hawthorn	25 years, 263 days	12	6	4	
Harry Dwan	Hawthorn	25 years, 164 days	4	3	0	Previously played for Richmond.
Bert Amey	Hawthorn	19 years, 261 days	15	3	0	
Ron Alsop	Hawthorn	28 years, 11 days	1	2	0	
Vic Atkinson	Hawthorn	23 years, 71 days	6	1	0	
Bob Harland	Hawthorn	28 years, 108 days	7	1	0	
Alvan Whittle	Hawthorn	24 years, 306 days	12	1	0	
Frank Kennedy	Melbourne	23 years, 280 days	1	36	11	
Ivan Porter	Melbourne	25 years, 304 days	10	25	31	
Es Downey	Melbourne	20 years, 283 days	3	22	7	
Ron Hall	Melbourne	24 years, 103 days	13	17	2	
Jack Stock	Melbourne	20 years, 216 days	6	14	0	
Clem Conroy	Melbourne	17 years, 165 days	1	12	1	
Percy Taylor	Melbourne	25 years, 26 days	1	9	20	Previously played for Geelong and South Melbourne.
Lloyd Bennett	Melbourne	28 years, 56 days	5	9	4	
Col Galbraith	Melbourne	24 years, 33 days	1	4	0	
Jack Compton	Melbourne	26 years, 124 days	7	3	2	
Frank McGrath	Melbourne	26 years, 258 days	1	2	1	
Tony Bizzaca	Melbourne	23 years, 53 days	10	2	1	
Neil Bencraft	Melbourne	19 years, 241 days	14	2	3	
Harry New	Melbourne	24 years, 48 days	18	2	0	
Jim Ryan	Melbourne	25 years, 356 days	16	1	0	
Don Condon	North Melbourne	21 years, 55 days	1	131	218	
Keith McKenzie	North Melbourne	22 years, 10 days	1	130	12	
Ted Jarrard	North Melbourne	22 years, 140 days	18	130	11	
Fred Fairweather	North Melbourne	30 years, 352 days	3	54	14	
Alf Clay	North Melbourne	30 years, 161 days	7	31	16	Previously played for Hawthorn, Fitzroy and Footscray.
Cam Bogie	North Melbourne	29 years, 128 days	15	19	2	
Ted Turner	North Melbourne	22 years, 222 days	13	16	1	
Ted Thomas	North Melbourne	22 years, 133 days	9	11	0	
Herbie Wood	North Melbourne	23 years, 272 days	1	10	1	
Jack Hunter	North Melbourne	29 years, 214 days	1	7	13	Previously played for Essendon.
Ken Watkins	North Melbourne	24 years, 277 days	3	5	0	
Eric Haggis	North Melbourne	29 years, 14 days	2	4	0	
Harold Daly	North Melbourne	28 years, 292 days	14	2	0	Previously played for Hawthorn.
Clive Smith	North Melbourne	20 years, 330 days	17	2	0	
Allan Wilson	North Melbourne	28 years, 9 days	1	1	0	
Bill Wilson	Richmond	19 years, 229 days	5	185	225	
Fred Cook	Richmond	21 years, 154 days	1	81	11	Twin brother of Keith Cook.
Bob Wiggins	Richmond	18 years, 185 days	16	68	2	
Les Jones	Richmond	21 years, 337 days	18	59	23	
Keith Cook	Richmond	21 years, 154 days	18	26	1	Twin brother of Fred Cook.
Laurie Taylor	Richmond	27 years, 167 days	1	20	48	Brother of Don Taylor.
Ray Bower	Richmond	21 years, 129 days	2	13	8	
Percy Bice	Richmond	28 years, 298 days	10	6	0	
Kevin Deagan	Richmond	20 years, 182 days	8	5	3	
Frank Hughes, Jr.	Richmond	23 years, 129 days	7	3	0	
Allen Lewis	Richmond	27 years, 231 days	7	3	0	
Pat Bourke	South Melbourne	20 years, 287 days	16	36	0	
Bob Matlock	South Melbourne	25 years, 298 days	4	35	0	
Norm Duncan	South Melbourne	21 years, 177 days	6	19	15	
Jack Danckert	South Melbourne	21 years, 357 days	9	13	0	
Lyal Keighran	South Melbourne	20 years, 237 days	1	10	6	
Jimmy McKnight	South Melbourne	21 years, 3 days	15	8	0	
Lou Frost	South Melbourne	27 years, 103 days	1	6	0	
Jack Sheedy	South Melbourne	17 years, 242 days	4	6	7	
Jack Oatey	South Melbourne	23 years, 279 days	5	5	4	
Joe De Medici	South Melbourne	24 years, 55 days	12	5	3	Previously played for Footscray.
Max Rippon	South Melbourne	23 years, 250 days	7	4	0	
Pat Grace	South Melbourne	20 years, 76 days	15	4	0	
Len O'Shea	South Melbourne	24 years, 188 days	13	2	1	
Colin Churchett	South Melbourne	18 years, 181 days	13	1	0	
Des Nisbet	St Kilda	22 years, 260 days	11	110	6	
Peter Bennett	St Kilda	17 years, 321 days	4	103	258	Represented Australia in water polo at the 1956 Summer Olympics in Melbourne.
Wal Armour	St Kilda	23 years, 15 days	2	33	36	
Bob Bibby	St Kilda	19 years, 46 days	5	32	3	
Jack Howe	St Kilda	22 years, 113 days	11	23	30	
Bill Wells	St Kilda	29 years, 240 days	12	22	2	Previously played for North Melbourne.
Gordon Geddes	St Kilda	21 years, 338 days	6	20	0	
Ted Rippon	St Kilda	30 years, 63 days	9	17	19	Previously played for Essendon.
Ray Gracie	St Kilda	26 years, 248 days	1	14	8	
Arch Knott	St Kilda	28 years, 185 days	14	12	1	Previously played for Fitzroy.
Brendon Bermingham	St Kilda	30 years, 36 days	9	8	1	
Chris Lamborn	St Kilda	28 years, 61 days	5	4	1	Previously played for North Melbourne and South Melbourne.
Peter Morcom	St Kilda	20 years, 284 days	16	3	4	
George Grainger	St Kilda	22 years, 316 days	2	2	0	
George Wilson	St Kilda	23 years, 315 days	2	2	0	Previously played for Collingwood.
Ray Pearce	St Kilda	27 years, 269 days	8	2	0	
Bernie Fyffe	St Kilda	22 years, 241 days	16	2	3	Previously played for Fitzroy.
Les Hazelwood	St Kilda	23 years, 331 days	14	1	1	Previously played for South Melbourne.
Jack Indian	St Kilda	18 years, 86 days	18	1	0	
