= 1949 VFA Grand Final =

Australian rules football match

Williamstown	Oakleigh
10.5 (65)	8.14 (62)
	1	2	3	4
WIL	1.2 (8)	2.2 (14)	7.3 (45)	10.5 (65)
OAK	2.3 (15)	5.9 (39)	6.12 (48)	8.14 (62)
- Date: 1 October 1949
- Ground: St Kilda Cricket Ground
- Attendance: 40,000
- Favourite: Oakleigh
- Umpires: Wright

Broadcast in Australia
- Radio: ABC

The 1949 VFA Grand Final was an Australian rules football match contested between the Williamstown Football Club and the Oakleigh Football Club at the St Kilda Cricket Ground on 1 October 1949. It was the 41st grand final of the Victorian Football Association (VFA), held to determine the premiers of the 1949 VFA season.

In a close-fought match, Oakleigh led the match at the first three breaks, before Williamstown were able to take the lead in a see-sawing final quarter. Oakleigh led by three points with only seconds remaining, but Johnny Walker was able to kick a running goal from the boundary line to give Williamstown a three-point lead moments before the final bell rang. It was Williamstown's fifth VFA premiership and Oakleigh's first grand final loss, although they won the premiership the following year.

For many years, it was thought that Williamstown's Ron Todd – who was playing his final VFA match – had missed his chance to kick his 1000th goal in senior football (including his career at Collingwood in the Victorian Football League and Williamstown combined) after he passed the ball to Allan Strang, who then passed it to Walker to kick the winning goal in the final seconds of the match. However, official records were amended in 2017 to credit Todd with 1,001 career goals instead of 999, meaning he had in fact kicked his 1000th goal during the grand final.

The crowd of 40,000 people at the St Kilda Cricket Ground was the second-highest attendance for a VFA/VFL grand final (equal with 1908 and 1953; only behind the 1939 grand final), which brought in a record £3,388 in ticket sales.

== Match summary ==
Williamstown's Norman Bernard does a one-hand stand as he falls in front of Oakleigh's Alex Boyle

In a pre-match ceremony at the ground, Preston captain-coach Jack Blackman was presented with the J. J. Liston Trophy as the competition's best-and-fairest player by VFA president Frank Hartnett, with immigration minister Arthur Calwell in attendance.

=== First quarter ===
Williamstown had the wind advantage in the first quarter, but Oakleigh's Alan Scott kicked the first goal of the match, before Williamstown equalled through a goal from John Molyneux. Oakleigh's second goal was kicked by captain-coach George Smeaton after a pass from Max Wenn. Although Oakleigh had the ball in their forward line for much of the first quarter, they struggled to convert against Williamstown defender Jack Danckert. Much of the crowd was focused on Ron Todd, who was thought to be sitting at 994 senior goals going into the match (in reality, he was at 996 goals); he kicked two behinds during the first quarter.

=== Second quarter ===
Todd kicked the first goal of the second quarter after he was awarded a free kick in Williamstown's forward line. Oakleigh had their first chance of the term to kick after a free was awarded to Wenn, but his kick fell short. Another chance for Todd was prevented after Alex Boyle knocked the ball out of play, with Clive Watson evading defenders to kick Oakleigh's first goal of the second quarter. While the defensive efforts of Danckert were still strong, Oakleigh managed another two goals – one from Jim Edwards and another from Watson – to lead by 25 points at half-time, having had the ball in their forward line for the vast majority of the quarter.

=== Third quarter ===
Oakleigh opened the third quarter with a goal from Ray Finn, giving them a match-high 31-point lead. Williamstown's Lou Salvas marked the ball in the centre of the ground and kicked it to Todd for a mark; Todd's shot for goal went wide. However, he had another opportunity when he marked over the pack and kicked his second goal of the day from an awkward angle. Williamstown half-back Bill Wells slung Smeaton to the ground but the incident was missed by the umpire, giving Williamstown another chance for a goal through a kick to Allan Strang, although he missed and the ball quickly returned to the centre; Norman Bernard snapped a goal over his shoulder shortly after to reduce the margin to 21 points. Todd kicked his third goal of the match after marking in front, then kicked a fourth after a pass from Johnny Walker from 50 metres out; this was, in reality, his 1000th senior goal, but it was believed at the time to have been his 998th. Walker also kicked his first goal late in the quarter to reduce the margin to just three points at the final break.

=== Final quarter ===
Williamstown's Ron Todd (number 1) and Oakleigh's Alex Boyle (number 27) attempt to mark the ball during the grand final

Wenn opened the scoring for Oakleigh early in the final quarter, while Williamstown were kicking into the wind. Todd missed another goal but was soon awarded a free on the half-forward line and kicked his fifth goal of the day; this was incorrectly thought to have been his 999th senior goal. After several attacking plays from both teams, Keith Abberton broke through the pack to kick his first goal of the match and give Williamstown the advantage and its first lead of the match. Much of the play became concentrated in Oakleigh's forward half; Bernie Perkins took a mark in the pocket to kick the ball to Smeaton, who marked and kicked truly to give Oakleigh a two-point lead.

Williamstown had another chance when Todd marked the ball and passed it to Lou Barker, but his kick was smothered and the ball quickly returned to Oakleigh's half. With around one minute remaining in the match, Oakleigh led by three points (8.14 to 9.5) and the ball entered their forward line, but Williamstown was able to clear it and attack. At this point in the match, players from both teams were visibly tired and were misjudging marking attempts, but Williamstown were able to get control of the football. Todd (who had an opportunity to kick his sixth goal of the match) passed the ball to Strang, who kicked to Walker in the forward pocket; Walker played on and kicked a goal to give Williamstown the lead. The final bell sounded moments after play resumed, with Williamstown winning the grand final by three points.

=== Scorecard ===
1949 VFA Grand Final
Saturday, 1 October	Williamstown	def.	Oakleigh	St Kilda Cricket Ground (crowd: 40,000)
1.2 (8); 2.2 (14); 7.3 (45); 10.5 (65)	Q1; Q2; Q3; Final	2.3 (15); 5.9 (39); 6.12 (48); 8.14 (62)	Umpires: Wright
Todd 5, Walker 3, Abberton, Bernard, Molyneux	Goals	Smeaton 2, Watson 2, Edward, Finn, Scott, Wenn
Wilcox, Wells, Danckert, Cameron, Salvas, Todd, Greenland, Molyneux	Best	Ryan, Boyle, Watson, Edwards, Donnelly, Finn, Wenn, Smeaton, Williams
Walker (cramp), McRae (leg), Sampson (ankle)	Injuries	Jory (knee), Baxter (ankle), Rawlings (thigh)

== Teams ==
Teams for the grand final were announced on 30 September 1949.

Williamstown
B:	7. Jack Danckert	6. Alf Sampson	9. Theo Greenland
HB:	4. Bill Wells	21. Gordon Cameron	12. Colin Wilcox
C:	15. Lou Barker	8. Reg Featherby	16. Bill Sheahan
HF:	14. Gordon Williams	22. Allan Strang	25. Johnny Walker
F:	11. Keith Abberton	1. Ron Todd (c)	28. John Molyneux
Foll:	2. Lou Salvas	5. Murray McRae	23. Mal Macpherson
Int:	19. Norman Bernard	13. Fred Matthews	
Coach:	Gordon Ogden		

Oakleigh
B:	14. Charlie Temme	27. Alex Boyle	7. Frank Deayton
HB:	10. Jim Donnelly	5. Ted Ryan	24. Billy Power
C:	30. Clive Watson	15. Archie Baxter	17. Ray Finn
HF:	19. Vic Hill	13. Max Wenn	1. George Smeaton
F:	4. Ron Jory	23. Alan Scott	26. Tom Rawlings
Foll:	20. Bill Williams	3. Bernie Perkins	28. Jim Edwards
Int:	12. Geoff Tivendale	11. Pat Leane	
Coach:	George Smeaton (captain-coach)		
Emg:	16. Les Gray		
