= 1949 VFA season =

68th season of the Victorian Football Association

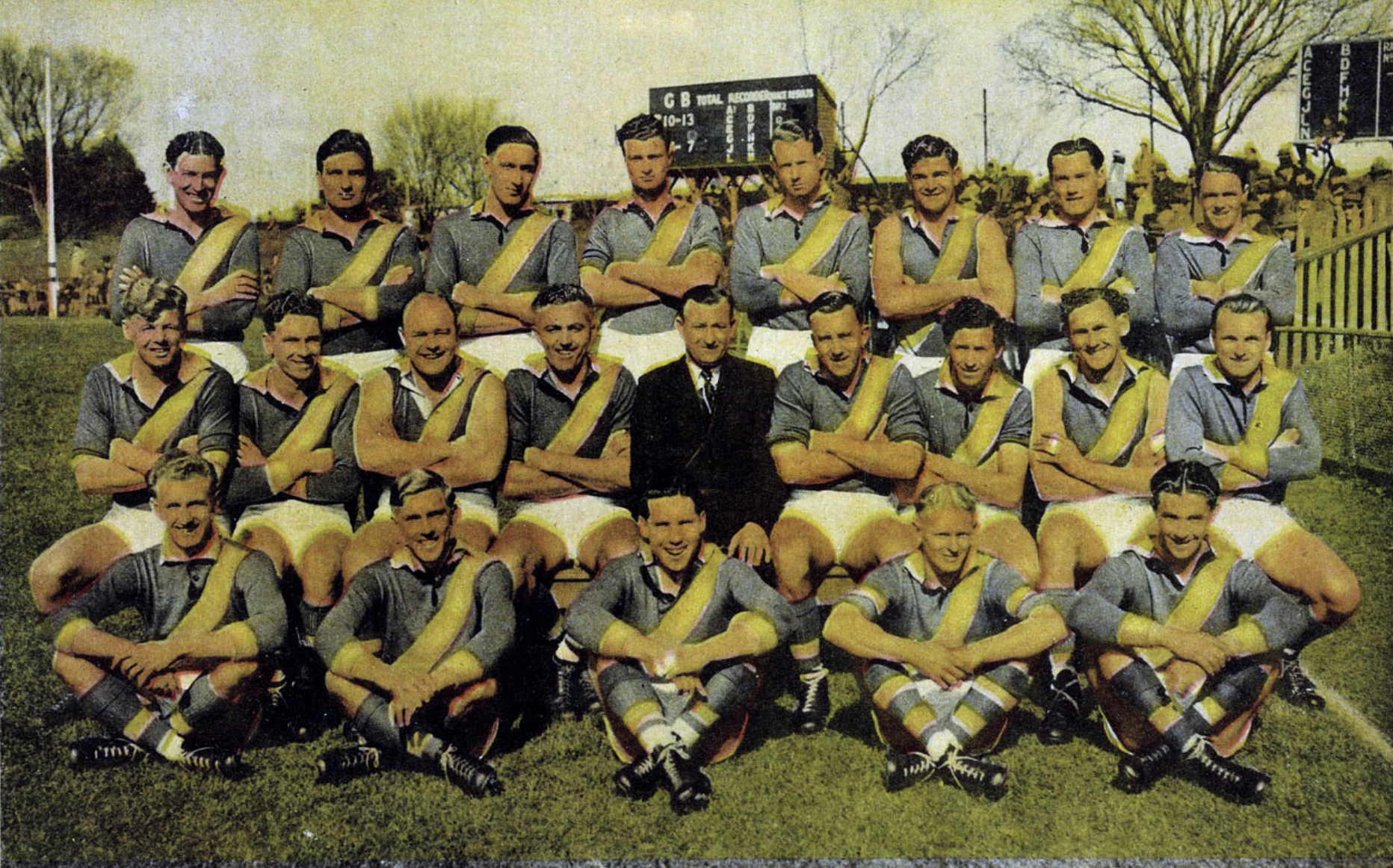
- Williamstown – 1949 VFA premiers

Overview
- Date: 16 April – 1 October 1949
- Teams: 12
- Premiers: Williamstown; 5th premiership
- Runners-up: Oakleigh; 1st runners-up result
- Minor premiers: Williamstown; 4th minor premiership

Attendance
- Matches played: 130
- Total attendance: 524,650 (4,036 per match)
- Highest (finals): 40,000 (Grand Final, Williamstown vs Oakleigh)

The 1949 VFA season was the 68th season of the Victorian Football Association (VFA), an Australian rules football competition played in the state of Victoria.

Williamstown won the premiership for the fifth time, after defeating Oakleigh by three points in the 1949 VFA Grand Final.

During the season, the VFA agreed to join the Australian National Football Council (effective from the 1950 season), ending a decade of division in Victorian football. Consequently, it was the final season in which the throw-pass was legal in the VFA.

== Background ==
During the 1940s, unity of football control within Victoria had been a topic of regular discussion. The two football bodies in Victoria had been divided since 1938, when the VFA broke away from Australian National Football Council (ANFC). In the following decade, the Association had introduced a number of rule changes, most notably legalising throwing of the football in general play, while the ANFC-affiliated Victorian Football League was bound by the national rules; and, there was no player transfer agreement between the two bodies, allowing players to switch codes without a clearance.

By standing alone, the Association's throw-pass innovation and aggressive recruiting of League stars substantially boosted its attendances during the 1940s. However, the schism was problematic for Australian rules football as a whole: the poaching of players from one body by the other was undermining public opinion, giving other sports the opportunity to attract disenchanted fans; and, the lack of a consistent code of rules made it more difficult to spread the game to other parts of the country. The VFL, VFA and ANFC all believed that the sport would benefit from unified control in Victoria, and there were regular discussions between the VFA and VFL during the early 1940s seeking amalgamation; none were successful. In the late 1940s, the VFA began looking at obtaining a seat on the ANFC as a means of unifying football control while maintaining its independence.

=== Player transfer reciprocity agreement ===
No arrangement for affiliation to the ANFC was reached for the 1949 season, but in March the VFA and VFL reached a separate bilateral agreement to recognise the validity of each other's clearances, effective from the start of the 1949 season. The new agreement meant that League players were not legally permitted to play in the Association without a clearance from their League clubs, or vice versa; prior to the agreement, players who switched competitions without a clearance received a suspension which was binding only in his former competition.

By the end of the season, both the League and the Association had agreed to lift any active suspensions which players had received for switching codes without a clearance.

=== ANFC affiliation ===
The Association formally agreed to affiliate with the ANFC in August 1949. Under the terms of the affiliation:

- The Association was to play under the ANFC's standard code of rules. This meant that it was forced to abandon the throw-pass and other rule changes it had introduced since 1938.
- The Association received a seat on the council, which had full rights except that it could not vote on council matters. According to the ANFC constitution, there could be only one voting delegate on the council from each state; Victoria's voting delegate was from the VFL, precluding the VFA from receiving a vote. However, the Association delegate had full rights to raise motions and put forward its views relating to other motions – a privilege not enjoyed by any other affiliated non-voting member of the ANFC. The lack of a vote had been the Association's major sticking point against affiliation in the past, and was the reason why an offer to affiliate in 1948 was rejected.
- The Association could send a representative team to play interstate matches or national carnivals.
- The Association could share the benefits of programs such as advertising, development programs, etc.
- The Association was not required to pay a levy to the ANFC.

The motion to affiliate was passed on 8 August 1949 by a majority of 18–7. Delegates representing Oakleigh, Williamstown and Yarraville voted against the motion. The Association remained affiliated with the ANFC until it was expelled in March 1970 for playing League players without an endorsed clearance.

== Home-and-away season ==
The home-and-away season was played over 21 matches, before the top four clubs contested a finals series under the Page–McIntyre system to determine the premiers for the season.

== Ladder ==
Pos	Team	Pld	W	L	D	PF	PA	PP	Pts
1	Williamstown (P)	21	16	5	0	2037	1664	122.4	64
2	Oakleigh	21	15	6	0	2320	1703	136.2	60
3	Brighton	21	15	6	0	2116	1920	110.2	60
4	Coburg	21	13	7	1	2003	1894	105.8	54
5	Brunswick	21	12	8	1	1972	1708	115.5	50
6	Camberwell	21	12	9	0	1871	1892	98.9	48
7	Port Melbourne	21	11	10	0	1866	1780	104.8	44
8	Prahran	21	8	13	0	2111	2076	101.7	32
9	Preston	21	8	13	0	1904	2128	89.5	32
10	Northcote	21	6	14	1	1683	1948	86.4	26
11	Sandringham	21	6	14	1	1747	2225	78.5	26
12	Yarraville	21	2	19	0	1840	2532	72.7	8

Rules for classification: 1) points; 2) percentage; 3) number of points for.
(P) Premiers

== Finals ==
=== Semi-finals ===
	Semi-finals
Saturday, 10 September	Brighton 14.15 (99)	def.	Coburg 11.8 (74)	St Kilda Cricket Ground (crowd: 14,000)
Saturday, 17 September	Williamstown 14.13 (97)	def.	Oakleigh 13.14 (92)	St Kilda Cricket Ground (crowd: 23,000)

=== Preliminary final ===
	Preliminary final
Saturday, 24 September	Oakleigh 14.16 (100)	def.	Brighton 12.13 (85)	St Kilda Cricket Ground (crowd: 22,000)

=== Grand Final ===
1949 VFA Grand Final
Saturday, 1 October	Williamstown	def.	Oakleigh	St Kilda Cricket Ground (crowd: 40,000)
1.2 (8); 2.2 (14); 7.3 (45); 10.5 (65)	Q1; Q2; Q3; Final	2.3 (15); 5.9 (39); 6.12 (48); 8.14 (62)	Umpires: Wright
Todd 5, Walker 3, Abberton, Bernard, Molyneux	Goals	Smeaton 2, Watson 2, Edward, Finn, Scott, Wenn
Wilcox, Wells, Danckert, Cameron, Salvas, Todd, Greenland, Molyneux	Best	Ryan, Boyle, Watson, Edwards, Donnelly, Finn, Wenn, Smeaton, Williams
Walker (cramp), McRae (leg), Sampson (ankle)	Injuries	Jory (knee), Baxter (ankle), Rawlings (thigh)

== Awards ==
- The leading goalkicker for the season was Keith Warburton (Brighton), who kicked 90 goals in the home-and-home season and 101 goals overall.
- The J. J. Liston Trophy was won by Jack Blackman (Preston), who polled 58 votes. He narrowly beat Roy Harper (Sandringham), who was second with 56 votes.
- Port Melbourne won the seconds premiership, after defeating Williamstown in the Grand Final Replay. In the Grand Final, played as a curtain raiser to the firsts Grand Final, Williamstown 9.15 (69) had led Port Melbourne 4.8 (32) at three-quarter time, before Port Melbourne came back to draw the game at 9.17 (71) apiece. Port Melbourne 12.25 (97) defeated Williamstown 11.8 (74) in the Replay on 8 October at Olympic Park.

== Notable events ==
- Squire Reid, who had been president of the Association since 1947, died from illness on 29 July. Former Camberwell player and president Dr Frank Hartnett was elected president of the Association in his place in August; Hartnett served as president until February 1951.
- In the final round of home-and-away matches, Sandringham 8.11 (59) trailed Camberwell 16.14 (110) by 51 points at three-quarter time, before kicking nine goals to zero to win the game by seven points, 17.17 (119) d. 16.16 (112).
