= 1944 VFL grand final =

Grand final of the 1944 Victorian Football League season

1944 VFL Grand Final

Fitzroy	Richmond
9.12 (66)	7.9 (51)
	1	2	3	4
FIT	1.2 (8)	4.8 (32)	6.10 (46)	9.12 (66)
RIC	2.2 (14)	3.2 (20)	5.5 (35)	7.9 (51)
- Date: 30 September 1944
- Stadium: Junction Oval
- Attendance: 43,000

The 1944 VFL Grand Final was an Australian rules football game contested between the Fitzroy Football Club and Richmond Football Club, held at the Junction Oval in Melbourne on 30 September 1944. It was the 46th annual grand final of the Victorian Football League, staged to determine the premiers for the 1944 VFL season.

The match was won by Fitzroy by a margin of 15 points, marking that club's first premiership since 1922, and its eighth (and final) premiership and final grand final appearance. The match attracted 41,000 spectators, down on expectations owing in part to a one-day tram strike.

This was Fitzroy's last VFL premiership before they merged with the Brisbane Bears in 1997 to become the Brisbane Lions. Fitzroy did not win another senior premiership or contest another grand final throughout its time in the VFL/AFL.

== Teams ==
Fitzroy	Richmond

Fitzroy
B:	Clen Denning	Fred Hughson (c)	Alan Fields
HB:	Laurie Bickerton	Norm Hillard	Arthur O'Bryan
C:	Bruce Calverley	George Hoskins	Noel Jarvis
HF:	Stan Dawson	Stan Wright	Noel Price
F:	Maurie Hearn	Ken Sier	Keith Stackpole
Foll:	Bert Clay	Jack Symons	Allan Ruthven
Res:	Dan Murray		
Coach:	Fred Hughson		

Richmond
B:	Max Oppy	George Smeaton	Charlie Priestley
HB:	Bernie Waldron	Leo Maguire	Bill Perkins
C:	Leo Merrett	Fred Cook	Bert Edwards
HF:	Arthur Mooney	Brian Randall	Les Jones
F:	Bob Bawden	Jack Scott	Fred Burge
Foll:	Jack Dyer (c)	Bill Morris	Bill Wilson
Res:	Keith Cook		
Coach:	Jack Dyer		

- Umpire – Eric Hawkins

== Statistics ==
=== Goalkickers ===
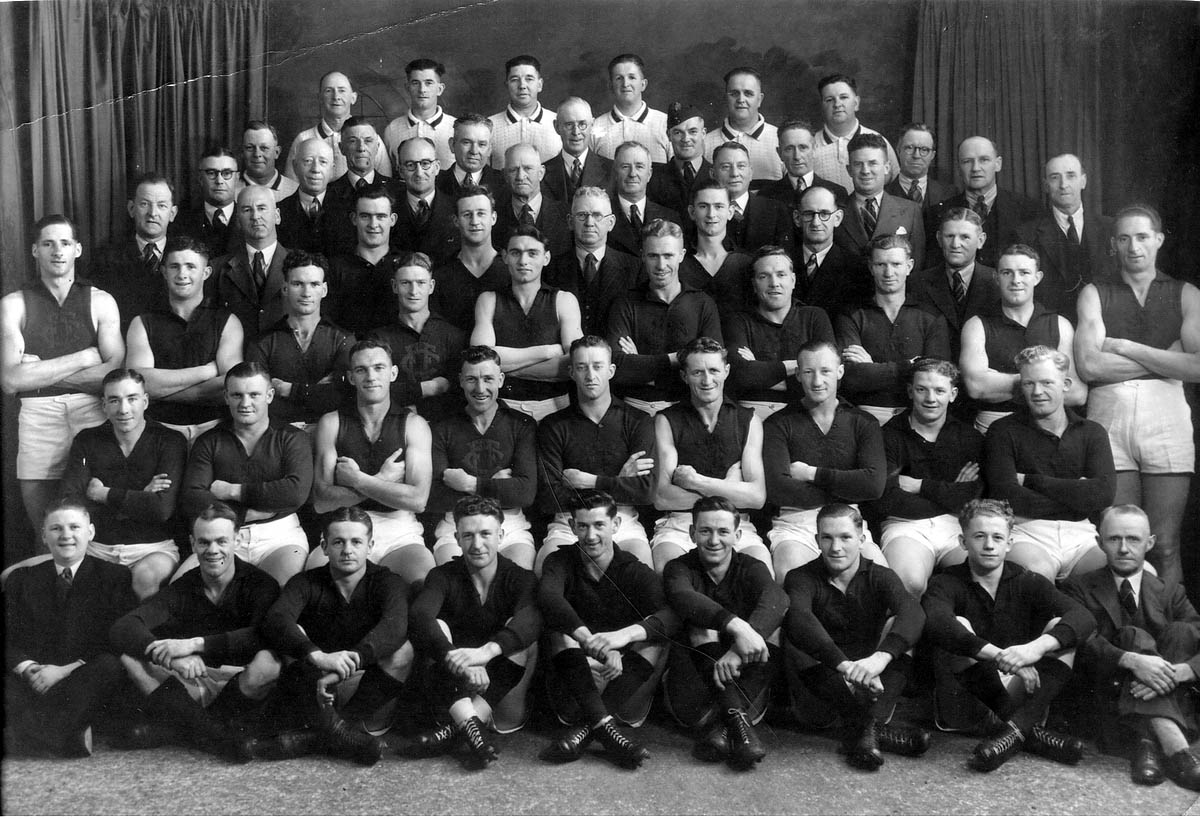
Fitzroy FC team, premiers

Fitzroy:

- K Sier 3
- K Stackpole 2
- B Calverley 1
- A Ruthven 1
- J Symons 1
- S Wright 1

Richmond:

- B Wilson 3
- B Randall 2
- F Burge 1
- J Dyer 1

== See also ==
- 1944 VFL season
