= Sier =

Sier is a surname. Notable people with the surname include:

- Brayden Sier (born 1997), Australian rules footballer
- Chris Sier, professor at Newcastle University Business School
- Gerry Sier (1928–2006), Australian rules footballer
- Ken Sier (1922–2001), Australian rules footballer
