= Don Henderson (disambiguation) =

Don Henderson (1931–1997) was an English actor of stage, television and screen.

Don Henderson may also refer to:

- Don Henderson (film producer), a pseudonym used by American actor, Tom Laughlin
- Don Henderson (linesman) (born 1968), Canadian National Hockey League linesman
- Don Henderson (folk singer) (1937–1991), Australian folk singer
- Don Henderson (footballer, born 1918) (1918–2010), Australian rules footballer for Footscray in 1944
- Don Henderson (footballer, born 1930) (1930–1999), Australian rules footballer for Footscray in the 1950s
- Donald Henderson (1928–2016), known as D.A. Henderson, American physician and epidemiologist
- Donald Henderson (writer) (1905–1947), English writer.
- Donald Henderson (character) a superhero, better known as Marksman, in the Champions role-playing game; later turned into Donald "Huntsman" Hunter in the spin-off League of Champions comic books

== See also ==
- Donald Henderson Clarke (1887-1958), American writer and journalist
