= Billy Power =

Billy Power may refer to:

- Billy Power (footballer) (1917–2002), Australian rules footballer
- Billy Power (hurler) (born 1999), Irish hurler

== See also ==
- William Power (disambiguation)
