= Percy Taylor =

Percy Taylor may refer to:

- Percy Taylor (Australian footballer)
- Percy Taylor (musician)
