= Alan Randall =

Alan Randall may refer to:

- Alan Randall (footballer)
- Alan Randall (entertainer)
