= Frank Deayton =

Australian rules footballer

Personal information
- Full name: Francis Gerald Deayton
- Born: 2 June 1921
- Died: 17 October 2004 (aged 83)
- Original team: Oakleigh

Playing career^{1}
Years	Club	Games (Goals)
1942–43	Melbourne	17 (2)
1948–50	Oakleigh (VFA)	22 (6)
- ^{1} Playing statistics correct to the end of 1950.

Francis Gerald Deayton (2 June 1921 – 17 October 2004) was an Australian rules footballer who played with Melbourne in the Victorian Football League (VFL).
