= Ken Collicoat =

Australian rules footballer and cricket umpire

Personal information
- Full name: Wilfred Kenneth Collicoat
- Born: 17 July 1919; Maldon, Victoria
- Died: 19 April 2007 (aged 87)
- Original team: Carlton reserves
- Height: 179 cm (5 ft 10 in)
- Weight: 86 kg (190 lb)

Playing career^{1}
Years	Club	Games (Goals)
1944	Essendon	2 (0)
- ^{1} Playing statistics correct to the end of 1944.

Wilfred Kenneth Collicoat (17 July 1919 – 19 April 2007) was an Australian rules footballer who played with Essendon in the Victorian Football League (VFL). He later umpired first-class cricket matches in the Sheffield Shield.

Collicoat, who was born in Maldon, played at Carlton Methodists before moving into the reserves team of the Carlton Football Club. He was unable to break into the seniors and switched clubs to Essendon, with whom he spent the 1944 VFL season under captain-coach Dick Reynolds. His two appearances came in an 84-point win over North Melbourne at Windy Hill and a 106-point victory against St Kilda at the same venue.

Brunswick secured his services in 1945 and he spent two seasons with the Victorian Football Association club. In 1948 he was appointed captain-coach of East Launceston. From 1950 to 1954, Collicoat captain-coached Bushfield, a town near Warrnambool.

He officiated in the first of his 21 first-class cricket matches in the 1961/1962 Sheffield Shield season. Until 1972 he regularly umpired Victoria's matches at the Melbourne Cricket Ground. These included matches against the touring national teams of the West Indies, New Zealand, India and South Africa.
