= John Sampson (footballer) =

Australian rules footballer, born 1908

Personal information
- Full name: John Alexander Sampson
- Born: 23 January 1908; Rupanyup, Victoria
- Died: 15 January 2001 (aged 92)
- Original team: Rupanyup

Playing career^{1}
Years	Club	Games (Goals)
1929–31	Footscray	13 (1)
- ^{1} Playing statistics correct to the end of 1931.

John Alexander Sampson (23 January 1908 – 15 January 2001) was an Australian rules footballer who played with Footscray in the Victorian Football League (VFL).

== Family ==
The son of John Sampson (1884–1942) and Grace Ivy Sampson, née Birch (1884–1954), John Alexander Sampson was born at Rupanyup on 23 January 1908. He was the older brother of fellow Footscray player Alf Sampson.

== War service ==
Sampson later served in the Royal Australian Air Force during World War II.

== Death ==
Sampson died on 15 January 2001 and was cremated at Fawkner Memorial Park.
