= Percy Jory =

Australian rules footballer and umpire

Personal information
- Full name: Percival James Hector Jory
- Born: 21 December 1888; Creswick, Victoria
- Died: 19 September 1964 (aged 75); Elwood, Victoria
- Original team: North Hobart
- Height: 180 cm (5 ft 11 in)
- Weight: 87 kg (192 lb)
- Position: Forward/Ruckman

Playing career^{1}
Years	Club	Games (Goals)
1912–15, 1920	St Kilda	60 (15)
- ^{1} Playing statistics correct to the end of 1920.

Career highlights
- AIF Pioneer Exhibition Game, London, 28 October 1916

Percival James Hector Jory (21 December 1888 – 19 September 1964) was an Australian rules footballer who played with St Kilda in the Victorian Football League (VFL).

== Family ==
The son of John Jory (1855–1897), and Alice Jory (1856–1922), née Pearce, Percival James Hector Jory was born at Creswick, Victoria on 21 December 1888.

His nephew, Edward Ronald "Ron" Jory (1925–2013) played for Essendon in the VFL, and for Oakleigh in the VFA.

== Football ==
Recruited from the North Hobart Football Club in the Tasmanian Football League.

His permit to play for St Kilda was granted on 24 April 1912, and he soon established himself as a forward who could also play in the ruck. He was a half-forward flanker in the 1913 VFL Grand Final loss to Fitzroy and two seasons later got suspended for 12 matches after being found guilty of elbowing an opponent.

When he returned home from his service with the First AIF he rejoined St Kilda briefly and then began umpiring matches in the country. He umpired three VFL games as a field umpire in 1925.

Jory umpired the 1927 Ovens and Murray Football League grand final.

From 1934 to 1942 he made 123 appearances as a goal umpire.

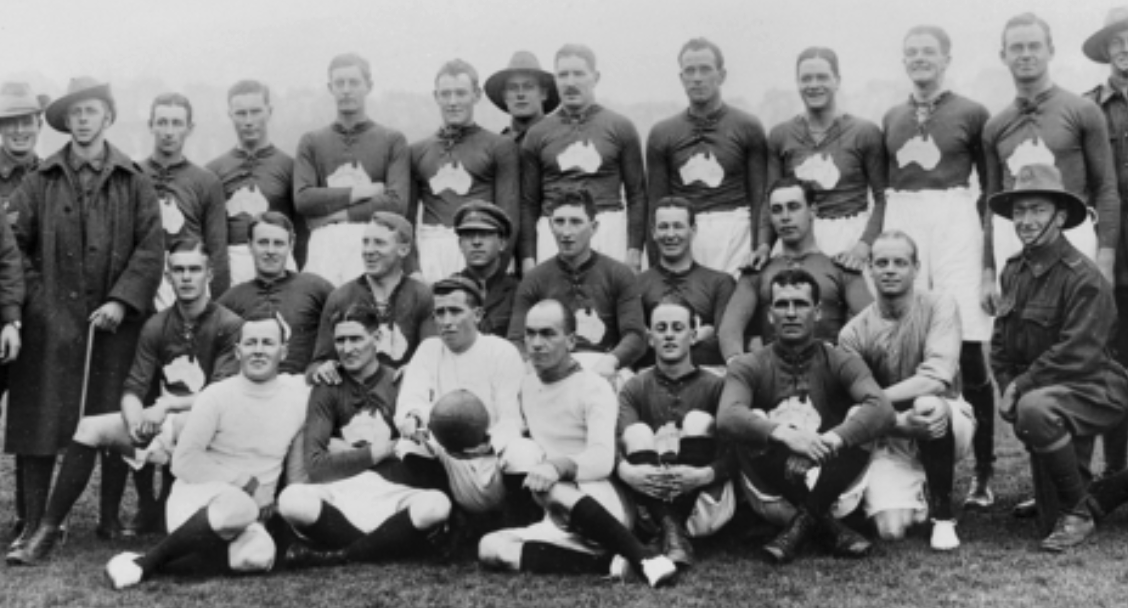
The Third Australian Divisional Team: 28 October 1916. Percy Jory is in the middle row, at the extreme right of the seated players.

== Military service ==
He enlisted in the First AIF on 12 January 1916, served overseas with the 31st Field Artillery Battery of the 8th Field Artillery Brigade, leaving Australia on the HMAT Medic on 20 May 1916, and returned to Australia on the H.T. Windhuk, arriving at Melbourne on 18 August 1919.

=== 28 October 1916 ===
While overseas, he played for the Third Australian Divisional Team, captained by South Melbourne's Bruce Sloss, in the famous "Pioneer Exhibition Game" of Australian Rules football, held in London, in October 1916, against the Australian Training Units Team, captained by Norwood's Charlie Perry. A news film was taken at the match.

== See also ==
- 1916 Pioneer Exhibition Game
