= Ted Ryan (footballer, born 1926) =

Australian rules football player

Personal information
- Full name: Edward Alan Ryan
- Born: 14 June 1926
- Died: 22 November 2003 (aged 77)
- Original team: Oakleigh (VFA)
- Height: 178 cm (5 ft 10 in)
- Weight: 86 kg (190 lb)

Playing career^{1}
Years	Club	Games (Goals)
1945	Footscray	6 (7)
- ^{1} Playing statistics correct to the end of 1945.

Edward Alan "Ted" Ryan (14 June 1926 – 22 November 2003) was an Australian rules footballer who played with Footscray in the Victorian Football League (VFL). Ryan started out at Oakleigh in the Victorian Football Association, from where he was recruited by Footscray. He appeared in six league games for Footscray, from rounds three to eight, in the 1945 VFL season. Oakleigh regained Ryan's services in 1946, without him being granted a clearance. He was full-back in Oakleigh's 1950 premiership team, a position he was only playing because of an injury to backman Alex Boyle. Also that year he was a member of the VFA representative team that played in Canberra in 1950. In 1951 he left for Hampden Football League club Mortlake, which he coached for three seasons. He returned to Oakleigh in 1954.
