= Es Downey =

Australian rules footballer

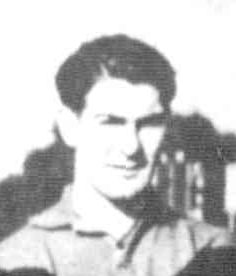

Personal information
- Full name: Esmond Joseph Downey
- Born: 11 August 1923; Melbourne, Victoria
- Died: 3 March 2011 (aged 87)
- Original team: Xavier College
- Height: 183 cm (6 ft 0 in)
- Weight: 85 kg (187 lb)
- Position: Centre half-back

Playing career^{1}
Years	Club	Games (Goals)
1944–45	Melbourne	22 (9)
- ^{1} Playing statistics correct to the end of 1945.

Esmond Joseph Downey AM (11 August 1923 – 3 March 2011) was an Australian rules footballer who played with Melbourne in the Victorian Football League (VFL).

== Career ==
Downey, who went to Xavier College, was a centre half-back for Melbourne University, before joining Melbourne in 1944. He played 16 league games for Melbourne in the 1944 VFL season and at the end of the year was named "Best First Year Player" at the club awards. He later played for Old Xaverians, coaching them in 1950 and 1951.

== Later life ==
Downey was made a Member of the Order of Australia in 2008, for "service to the community through a range of church, educational and aged care organisations."
