= Bert Lucas =

Australian rules footballer and coach

Personal information
- Full name: Albert William Leslie Lucas
- Born: 3 April 1922; Collingwood, Victoria
- Died: 21 February 1988 (aged 65); Shepparton, victoria
- Original team: Sandringham
- Height: 185 cm (6 ft 1 in)
- Weight: 91 kg (201 lb)
- Position: Ruckman

Playing career^{1}
Years	Club	Games (Goals)
1944	Carlton	7 (5)
1946–1950	South Melbourne	69 (31)
Total		76 (36)
- ^{1} Playing statistics correct to the end of 1950.

Albert William Leslie "Bert" Lucas (3 April 1922 – 21 February 1988) was an Australian rules footballer who played with Carlton and South Melbourne in the Victorian Football League (VFL).

Lucas had his early career interrupted by the war but managed seven appearances for Carlton in the 1944 VFL season. A ruckman, he played five seasons at South Melbourne and was joined at the club by his brother George in 1947. He took over from Jack Graham as South Melbourne captain in 1949 but held the position for just one year.

He left South Melbourne in 1951 to become captain-coach of Tasmanian club Sandy Bay. In 1954 he returned to Victoria, as playing coach of Nathalia.
