= Fred Cook (Australian footballer, born 1922) =

Australian rules footballer

Personal information
- Full name: Frederick George Cook
- Born: 4 December 1922; Croydon, Victoria
- Died: 17 December 1984 (aged 62)
- Original team: Croydon
- Height: 180 cm (5 ft 11 in)
- Weight: 77 kg (170 lb)

Playing career^{1}
Years	Club	Games (Goals)
1944–1949	Richmond	81 (11)
- ^{1} Playing statistics correct to the end of 1949.

Frederick George Cook (4 December 1922 – 17 December 1984) was an Australian rules football player for Richmond Football Club in the Victorian Football League and also served in the RAAF. Cook was originally from Croydon and played 81 games between 1944 and 1949, including the 1944 VFL Grand Final, which Richmond lost to Fitzroy. His identical twin brother Keith Cook also played league football for Richmond.
