= Neil Bencraft =

Australian rules footballer and coach

Personal information
- Full name: Charles Neilson Bencraft
- Born: 8 December 1924
- Died: 10 October 2010 (aged 85)
- Original team: Sandringham Colts
- Height: 165 cm (5 ft 5 in)
- Weight: 64 kg (141 lb)
- Position: Rover

Playing career^{1}
Years	Club	Games (Goals)
1944	Melbourne	2 (3)
1945–52	Sandringham	140 (227)
- ^{1} Playing statistics correct to the end of 1952.

Charles Neilson Bencraft (8 December 1924 – 10 October 2010) was an Australian rules football player and coach with the Sandringham Football Club in the Victorian Football Association.

Bencraft, a rover originally from Sandringham, played briefly for the Melbourne Football Club in the Victorian Football League during the 1944 season, playing a total of two senior games. When the VFA resumed competition in 1945, Bencraft played for Sandringham, where he played from 1945 until 1952, and again in 1956. He was a notable member of the club's inaugural premiership in 1946, kicking the winning goal in the club's one-point preliminary final against Williamstown (in which it had come back from a 40-point three-quarter time deficit), then kicking the last goal in its seven-point Grand Final win against Camberwell. He was also a member of the 1947 Grand Final team.

Bencraft was appointed senior coach of Sandringham in 1958, and coached there for five years. He led the club to two Grand Finals, including the 1962 premiership – in which the club came from behind to win the Grand Final by one point, after trailing Moorabbin by 44 points at three quarter time. It was his last year in a five-season stint as coach, although he was called on again in 1974 for one more year. Bencraft also had great success as Sandringham's Thirds coach, leading the team to five premierships in twelve seasons; he retired at the end of 1983, frustrated by the fact that the Thirds had been altered from an Under-19s competition to an Under-18s competition that season.

Both the main grandstand at Trevor Barker Beach Oval and the Sandringham Best and Fairest award are named after Bencraft, and he is a member of the club's Hall of Fame. He earned his primary living working as a butcher.
