= Arthur Mooney =

Australian rules footballer

Personal information
- Full name: Arthur Mooney
- Born: 14 December 1924
- Died: 30 July 1988 (aged 63)
- Original team: Richmond Recruits
- Height: 180 cm (5 ft 11 in)
- Weight: 79 kg (174 lb)

Playing career^{1}
Years	Club	Games (Goals)
1943–1948	Richmond	66 (94)
- ^{1} Playing statistics correct to the end of 1948.

Arthur Mooney (14 December 1924 – 30 July 1988) was an Australian rules footballer who played with Richmond in the Victorian Football League (VFL).

Mooney, who arrived at the club from the Richmond Recruits, was a half forward flanker.

He was a member of the Richmond team which lost the 1944 VFL Grand Final.

His 49 goals in the 1946 VFL season were enough to top Richmond's goal-kicking.
