= Keith Warburton =

Australian rules footballer

Personal information
- Full name: Keith John Warburton
- Born: 7 June 1929
- Died: 28 June 2018 (aged 89)
- Original team: Brighton (VFA)
- Debut: Round 1, 1951, Carlton vs. Hawthorn, at Princes Park
- Height: 178 cm (5 ft 10 in)
- Weight: 79 kg (174 lb)

Playing career^{1}
Years	Club	Games (Goals)
1946–1950	Brighton (VFA)	90 (317)
1951–1955	Carlton	74 (91)
- ^{1} Playing statistics correct to the end of 1955.

Keith John Warburton (7 June 1929 – 28 June 2018) was an Australian rules footballer in the Victorian Football League.

Warburton first played senior football for the Brighton Football Club in the Victorian Football Association. He was a member of Brighton's sole premiership team in 1948, and kicked three goals in the Grand Final; and, he was the Association's leading goalkicker in 1949, kicking 101 goals. Altogether, Warburton played 90 games for Brighton, and kicked 317 goals.

Warburton moved to the Carlton Football Club in the Victorian Football League, and made his debut in Round 1 of the 1951 season. He received a heavy knock during a game in 1952 and was rushed to hospital after collapsing at a dance after the game. He was eventually forced to retire in 1955 due to ongoing problems as a result of that knock.
