= Percy Taylor (Australian footballer) =

Australian rules footballer

Personal information
- Full name: Percy Allen Taylor
- Born: 10 April 1919; Allansford, Victoria
- Died: 28 December 1979 (aged 60); Geelong, Victoria
- Original team: Geelong West
- Height: 168 cm (5 ft 6 in)
- Weight: 70 kg (154 lb)
- Position: Rover

Playing career^{1}
Years	Club	Games (Goals)
1939–1941	Geelong	25 (21)
1943	South Melbourne	7 (16)
1944–1945	Melbourne	9 (20)
1945–1946	Port Melbourne (VFA)	
Total		41 (57)
- ^{1} Playing statistics correct to the end of 1945.

Percy Allen Taylor (10 April 1919 – 28 December 1979) was an Australian rules footballer who played with Geelong, South Melbourne and Melbourne in the Victorian Football League (VFL).

Taylor was the joint second leading goalkicker for Melbourne in the 1944 VFL season, with 17 goals from only seven games.
