= Max Wenn =

Australian rules footballer (1926–2008)

Personal information
- Full name: Max Wenn
- Born: 13 September 1926
- Died: 22 September 2008 (aged 82)
- Original team: Berwick / Oakleigh
- Height: 180 cm (5 ft 11 in)
- Weight: 84 kg (185 lb)
- Position: Half-forward

Playing career^{1}
Years	Club	Games (Goals)
1953–54	Carlton	26 (38)
- ^{1} Playing statistics correct to the end of 1954.

Max Wenn (13 September 1926 – 22 September 2008) was an Australian rules footballer who played with Carlton in the Victorian Football League (VFL).
