= Laurie Bickerton =

Australian rules footballer, born 1917

Personal information
- Full name: Lawrence Henry Bickerton
- Born: 10 August 1917; Williamstown, Victoria
- Died: 10 August 2009 (aged 92); Maroochydore, Queensland
- Original team: Oakleigh (VFA)
- Height: 179 cm (5 ft 10 in)
- Weight: 80 kg (176 lb)

Playing career^{1}
| Years | Club | Games (Goals) |
| 1944 | Fitzroy | 12 (0) |
- ^{1} Playing statistics correct to the end of 1944.

Lawrence Henry "Laurie" Bickerton (10 August 1917 – 10 August 2009) was an Australian rules footballer who played with Fitzroy in the Victorian Football League (VFL) during their final premiership season in 1944. He played on the half back flank in the Grand Final.
