= Bill Wells (footballer) =

Australian rules footballer (1920–2013)

Bill "Bomber" Wells

Personal information
- Full name: William George Wells
- Nickname: Bomber
- Born: 8 November 1920; Brunswick, Victoria
- Died: 16 March 2013 (aged 92)
- Original team: East Coburg
- Height: 175 cm (5 ft 9 in)
- Weight: 76 kg (168 lb)
- Position: Forward

Playing career^{1}
Years	Club	Games (Goals)
1939–1944	North Melbourne	14 (4)
1944–1945	St Kilda	22 (2)
Total		36 (6)
- ^{1} Playing statistics correct to the end of 1953.

Career highlights
- Williamstown premiership player: 1949; Ballarat Football League leading goalkicker: 1950, 1952, 1953

William George Wells (also known as Bomber Wells, 8 November 1920 – 16 March 2013) was an Australian rules footballer who played with North Melbourne and St Kilda in the Victorian Football League (VFL). He was injured during the war and told he was expected to spend the remainder of his life in a wheelchair, but made a successful comeback. After leaving the VFL he played for various clubs, including three stints with Williamstown in the Victorian Football Association (VFA). He also coached in the Wimmera Football League and Ballarat Football League.

== North Melbourne ==
Wells, who was born in Brunswick, came to North Melbourne from East Coburg. He started the 1939 season strongly in the league seconds and was called up to make his senior debut in round five after kicking 11 goals from two games. That year he played six senior games, all in succession.

In 1940 he made another six appearances and during the year enlisted in the AIF. His availability was limited during the war and he missed the entire 1941 and 1942 seasons.

== World War I ==
While serving in the Middle East, Wells received wounds which left him paralysed. He was repatriated to Heidelberg Military Hospital, then later Ballarat. Doctors told him that he would never walk again and that he would have to remain in bed for the next five years. Determined for this not to be the case, there is an account of his time in hospital when he broke out of his plaster cast in order to go over and restart a radio, for which he was fined for going against orders. His recovery went better than expected and he was gradually given more freedom.

After 15 months in a plaster cast, Wells was discharged from the AIF in 1943.

== Return to football ==
He resumed his football career in 1944 as coach of East Brunswick. North Melbourne had granted him a clearance, but it was on the condition he would return to the club if required. In round eight he returned for a game against Essendon, a club he then tried to join. The clearance was this time refused by North Melbourne and he then requested to join St Kilda, which was accommodated.

=== St Kilda ===
Wells debuted for St Kilda in round 12 and did not miss a game for the rest of the 1944 season.

His 1945 season was the most productive of his VFL career, with 15 games for St Kilda, as a utility player. It was also his final VFL season; in March 1946 he was cleared to Williamstown in the VFA.

== Post-VFL career ==
Unlike with his time at North Melbourne and St Kilda, Wells was part of a strong side at Williamstown. He played finals football in 1946 and won the club's award for "Most Determined" player. The season ended in disappointment when he was a member of the Williamstown team which lost to Sandringham by a single point in the preliminary final.

In 1947 he was appointed captain-coach of Murtoa in the Wimmera Football League, on £8 a week, in addition to free lodging. He led the club to fifth position, which was the highest they had finished during their time in the competition.

Although his intent had been to return to Williamstown after one year, in 1948 he joined East Ballarat as captain-coach. He was on the sidelines early in the season after fracturing three ribs in a game against Stawell. Under the coaching of Wells, East Ballarat lost only one game in the home and away season, but faltered in the finals, with two losses meaning early elimination. All of East Ballarat's three losses for the year were by under a goal.

Wells moved back to Melbourne in 1949 and became proprietor of a milk bar in Port Melbourne. After appearing in the first 10 rounds of the 1949 VFA season with Port Melbourne, Wells returned to Williamstown in June. He played an important role in another finals campaign for Williamstown in 1949 and got to play in a premiership, as a half-back flanker in the club's grand final winning team.

He looked set to join VFA club Yarraville as coach in 1950, but was unable to get a clearance. Instead he joined Maryborough in the Ballarat Football League as captain-coach. He played for Maryborough as a forward and was the league's leading goal-kicker in the 1950 season with 73 goals. The club made the preliminary final, which they lost to East Ballarat.

In 1951 he was again back at Williamstown for another season in the VFA. During the year he sold his milk bar and announced his retirement from VFA football in August, citing a desire to move to the country and purchase a hotel.

He ended up returning to Ballarat and for the 1952 season signed with Redan. Back to the form he had shown with Maryborough, Wells was again dominant up forward and topped the league's goal-kicking for a second time. Ending his sequence of one season stints since leaving VFL football, Wells remained at Redan in 1953 and had a record breaking season. With his 114th goal for the season, kicked in the semi-final against Ballarat, he went past the league record set by Dave Duff in 1927. He was only able to add two goals in the grand final, which Redan lost to Golden Point, to finish with 116 goals for the year. He retired at the end of the season due to a recurrence of his injuries from the war.
