= Les Gray (footballer) =

Australian rules footballer

Personal information
- Full name: Les Gray
- Born: 4 October 1921
- Died: 1 June 2008 (aged 86)
- Original team: Glenhuntly
- Height: 169 cm (5 ft 7 in)
- Weight: 67 kg (148 lb)
- Position: Wing

Playing career^{1}
Years	Club	Games (Goals)
1941–46	St Kilda	36 (5)
- ^{1} Playing statistics correct to the end of 1946.

Les Gray (4 October 1921 – 1 June 2008) was an Australian rules footballer who played with St Kilda in the Victorian Football League (VFL).
