= Col Galbraith =

Australian rules footballer

Personal information
- Full name: Colin Alfred Galbraith
- Born: 3 April 1920; Essendon, Victoria
- Died: 8 August 1986 (aged 66); Malvern, Victoria
- Original team: University Blacks
- Height: 182 cm (6 ft 0 in)
- Weight: 79 kg (174 lb)

Playing career^{1}
Years	Club	Games (Goals)
1944	Melbourne	4 (0)
- ^{1} Playing statistics correct to the end of 1944.

Colin Alfred Galbraith (3 April 1920 – 8 August 1986) was an Australian rules footballer who played with Melbourne in the Victorian Football League (VFL).
