= Ray Pearce =

Australian rules footballer, born 1916

Personal information
- Full name: Raymond Pearce
- Born: 29 September 1916; Glenorchy, Tasmania
- Died: 29 August 1975 (aged 58); Hobart, Tasmania
- Original team: North Hobart
- Height: 170 cm (5 ft 7 in)
- Weight: 73 kg (161 lb)

Playing career^{1}
Years	Club	Games (Goals)
1944	St Kilda	2 (0)
- ^{1} Playing statistics correct to the end of 1944.

Raymond Pearce (29 September 1916 – 29 August 1975) was an Australian rules footballer who played with St Kilda in the Victorian Football League (VFL).

Pearce enlisted in the Australian Army in February 1944, playing two games for St Kilda while serving in the Australian Supply Depot Platoon.
