= Jack Nilson =

Australian rules footballer, born 1919

Personal information
- Full name: John Ivar Nilson
- Born: 12 March 1919; Carlton, Victoria
- Died: 31 October 1970 (aged 51); Parkville, Victoria
- Original team: Brunswick
- Height: 175 cm (5 ft 9 in)
- Weight: 71.5 kg (158 lb)

Playing career^{1}
Years	Club	Games (Goals)
1944	Collingwood	3 (0)
- ^{1} Playing statistics correct to the end of 1944.

John Ivar Nilson (12 March 1919 – 31 October 1970) was an Australian rules footballer who played with Collingwood in the Victorian Football League (VFL).

== Family ==
Nilson was of Finnish heritage. His mother, Suleima Elizabeth Siuro (c1893-1919), a domestic servant, died in Melbourne on 15 March 1919 from the 1919 influenza epidemic three days after his birth. He was then adopted by Swedish immigrants, Bror Edvard Nilsson (a.k.a. Nilson) (−1956), and Ida Ingeborg Nilson (1882–1937), née Gröndahl (a.k.a. Greendale), who lived in West Brunswick.

He married Gwendoline Claire Johnson (1922–1985) on 11 April 1942. They had three children.

== War service ==
Nilson served in the 58th Battalion of the Second AIF during World War II.

== Death ==
He died at Parkville, Victoria on 31 October 1970.
