= Arthur Robbins =

Australian rules footballer (1920–2010)

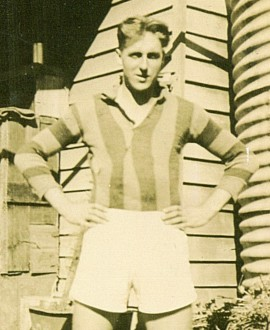
- Robbins in 1944

Personal information
- Full name: William Arthur Robbins
- Born: 4 February 1920; Morwell, Victoria
- Died: 8 November 2010 (aged 90); Moe, Victoria
- Original team: Navy / Boolarra
- Height: 188 cm (6 ft 2 in)
- Weight: 84 kg (185 lb)

Playing career^{1}
Years	Club	Games (Goals)
1944	Collingwood	2 (0)
- ^{1} Playing statistics correct to the end of 1944.

William Arthur Robbins (4 February 1920 – 8 November 2010) was an Australian rules footballer who played for the Collingwood Football Club in the Victorian Football League (VFL).

Robbins enlisted in the Australian Army in July 1940 and served for the remainder of World War II. Part of his service was in the 1st Naval Bombardment Group on HMAS Shropshire and while serving he played two games for Collingwood in the 1944 VFL season.
