= Jack Harrow (Australian footballer) =

Australian rules footballer

Personal information
- Full name: John Harold Harrow
- Born: 1 April 1921; Carlton North, Victoria
- Died: 18 October 1961 (aged 40); Heidelberg, Victoria
- Original team: RAAF / Preston
- Height: 183 cm (6 ft 0 in)
- Weight: 80 kg (176 lb)

Playing career^{1}
Years	Club	Games (Goals)
1944	Fitzroy	2 (0)
- ^{1} Playing statistics correct to the end of 1944.

John Harold Harrow (1 April 1921 – 18 October 1961) was an Australian rules footballer who played with Fitzroy in the Victorian Football League (VFL).

== Family ==
Te son of Samuel Robert Kenyon Harrow (1890–1974), and Elsie Marietta Harrow (1892–1988), née Orsino, John Harold Harrow was born at Carlton North, Victoria on 1 April 1921.

He married Valerie Kathleen Barton (1921–1996), at Marysville, Victoria on 15 April 1944.

== Death ==
He died at the Heidelberg Repatriation Hospital on 18 October 1961.
