= Peter Morcom =

Australian rules footballer

Personal information
- Full name: Peter Morcom
- Born: 9 November 1923
- Died: 12 December 2007 (aged 84)
- Original team: Caulfield Grammar
- Height: 188 cm (6 ft 2 in)
- Weight: 81 kg (179 lb)

Playing career^{1}
Years	Club	Games (Goals)
1944	St Kilda	3 (4)
- ^{1} Playing statistics correct to the end of 1944.

Peter Morcom (9 November 1923 – 12 December 2007) was an Australian rules footballer who played with St Kilda in the Victorian Football League (VFL).
