= Stan Dawson =

Australian rules footballer, born 1917

Personal information
- Born: 12 August 1917
- Died: 25 December 1973 (aged 56)
- Original team: Collingwood Junior League
- Height: 179 cm (5 ft 10 in)
- Weight: 71 kg (157 lb)

Playing career^{1}
Years	Club	Games (Goals)
1938–1941	Collingwood	21 (20)
1943–1946	Fitzroy	57 (40)
Total		78 (60)
- ^{1} Playing statistics correct to the end of 1946.

Stan Dawson (12 August 1917 – 25 December 1973) was an Australian rules footballer who played with Collingwood and Fitzroy in the Victorian Football League (VFL). In 1941 he transferred from Collingwood to Victorian Football Association club, Preston. He usually played on the half forward line.
