= Archie Baxter =

Australian rules footballer

Personal information
- Full name: Archibald Murray Baxter
- Born: 4 August 1921; Brunswick, Victoria
- Died: 1 August 2012 (aged 90)
- Height: 180 cm (5 ft 11 in)
- Weight: 78 kg (172 lb)

Playing career^{1}
Years	Club	Games (Goals)
1941–1946	South Melbourne	23 (25)
1947–1952	Oakleigh (VFA)	71 (28)
- ^{1} Playing statistics correct to the end of 1952.

Archibald Murray Baxter (4 August 1921 – 1 August 2012) was an Australian rules footballer who played for South Melbourne in the Victorian Football League (VFL) during the 1940s.

While training with VFL side Hawthorn in 1940, Baxter kicked 123 goals for Edithvale as an 18yo.

Baxter had an intermittent career at South Melbourne, which began in the 1941 VFL season when he was their third most prolific forward with 16 goals. He didn't appear again until 1944 and missed the entire 1945 season before returning to action the following year. Baxter then captained Oakleigh to two VFA premierships, in 1950 and 1952.

Archie's mother was of Irish descendency and his father was born in Scotland. He had one brother and two sisters.

During World War II, Archie was posted with the 2/4 Independent Company Commando Unit in the Australian Army. He served during the ages of 17–21 years old in the Pacific and the Middle East. Following a shrapnel wound to the shoulder he was discharged from the army in 1942.

Archie Baxter was also employed as Chief Aircraft Production Engineer for 40 years with the Commonwealth Aircraft Corporation (CAC).
