= Jack Stock =

Australian rules footballer

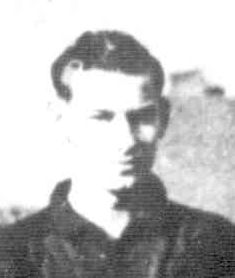

Personal information
- Full name: Jack Stock
- Born: 7 November 1923
- Died: 16 July 2013 (aged 89)

Playing career^{1}
Years	Club	Games (Goals)
1944–45	Melbourne	14 (0)
- ^{1} Playing statistics correct to the end of 1945.

Jack Stock (7 November 1923 – 16 July 2013) was an Australian rules footballer who played with Melbourne in the Victorian Football League (VFL).
