= Ron Todd (footballer) =

Australian rules footballer (1916–1991)

- Todd with Williamstown in 1941

Personal information
- Full name: Ronald Walford Todd
- Born: 23 October 1916
- Died: 8 February 1991 (aged 74)
- Original team: Victorian Railways
- Height: 6 ft 2 in (187 cm)
- Weight: 12 st 13 lb (82 kg)
- Position: Forward

Playing career^{1}
Years	Club	Games (Goals)
1935–1939	Collingwood	76 (327)
1940–41, 1945–49	Williamstown (VFA)	141 (674)

Representative team honours
Years	Team	Games (Goals)
	Victoria	5 (28)
- ^{1} Playing statistics correct to the end of 1949.

Career highlights
- VFL Premiership player: 1936; 2x VFA premiership player: 1945, 1949; 2x VFL Leading Goalkicker Medalist 1938, 1939; 2x VFA Leading Goalkicker: 945, 1946; Australian Football Hall of Fame inductee, 2017

Ronald Walford Todd (23 October 1916 – 8 February 1991) was an Australian rules footballer who played for Collingwood in the Victorian Football League (VFL) and Williamstown in the Victorian Football Association (VFA). Renowned for his high marking and goalkicking ability, Todd was considered as the logical successor to the legendary Gordon Coventry, but his controversial move to Williamstown, along with teammate and friend Des Fothergill, caused much bitterness at Collingwood for many years afterward. He holds the record for the most goals kicked in a VFA season (188), and his 23 goals in the 1939 VFL finals series stood as a record until it was broken by Gary Ablett Sr. in 1989.

== VFL career ==
Todd debuted for Collingwood in 1935 and joined Gordon Coventry in the forward line. For his first three seasons Todd played at centre half-forward but moved to full-forward when Coventry retired at the end of 1937. He had an immediate impact, kicking 102 goals in the 1938 home and away season before adding 18 more in the finals. In a game during that season against Carlton Todd kicked 11.5 yet ended up on the losing team. In another game, against Richmond, Todd kicked 7 goals and 12 points, as well as kicking out of bounds on the full five times. His season tally was the highest in the league and Todd again topped the league in 1939 VFL season, this time finishing with 121 goals.

His 1939 finals total of 23 goals was not bettered until Gary Ablett kicked 27 in the 1989 series. In the last home-and-away round against Richmond Todd brought up his 300th career goal. His 73 games equalled Bob Pratt's record for fewest games required to reach that milestone.

== VFA career ==
Todd's VFL career ended when he signed up to play under throw-pass rules with VFA club Williamstown just before the 1940 season kicked off. Todd actually signed not with the club but with Williamstown Vice President, William John (Bill) Dooley; he was the highest-paid footballer in Australia, earning a reported £500 flat (equivalent to A$47,627 in 2022) plus £5 per week (equivalent to A$476 in 2022) for a three-year deal, more than ten times his wage at Collingwood. Todd's departure was met with fury at Collingwood, and they refused to clear him – although, due to the VFA having broken its permit reciprocity agreement with the VFL, this was no obstacle to his transfer. Todd briefly equivocated on his decision, playing a practice match with Collingwood in April 1940 and offering to return the upfront payment he had received; but after potential legal action from Dooley and Williamstown, as they had sold memberships and made ground improvements on the basis of the attraction of having Todd and Harry Vallence in the same side, Todd ultimately made the move to Williamstown in round 1 of the VFA season.

Todd played at centre half-forward in his first season with Williamstown and kicked 99 goals, and when the Victorian Football Association (VFA) went into recess in 1942, Todd joined the air force. Despite an interest in returning to Collingwood, whose fortunes had declined abruptly since Todd left, when he spent some time in Melbourne on leave, a three-year VFL ban due to his crossing without a clearance made any return to the Magpies during the war impossible.

When the VFA resumed competition in 1945, Todd re-applied for a permit to play with Collingwood. The Collingwood committee held a meeting, from which Todd was excluded from which but could overhear from outside the committee room, and over two hours there was debate during which several committee members still bitter from his 1940 departure loudly voiced their displeasure; eventually, Todd did not wait for the committee's decision, calling Bill Dooley to collect him and agreeing to return to Williamstown, further damaging his relationship with Collingwood. Back at Williamstown, Todd moved to full-forward for 1945 and kicked a record 188 goals for the season which still stands today, including 20 goals in a game against Oakleigh; he also kicked 57 goals for an RAAF team in Sunday competition during the season, and after the VFA season finished, kicked nine goals for the RAAF in a match against a North Tasmania team and 16 goals for a combined Williamstown/Coburg team on a two-match tour of Broken Hill, bringing his overall total for the year to 270 goals from 41 games.

At Williamstown, Todd played 141 games for 674 goals, in the process playing in premiership sides in 1945 and 1949. He was the star player of the VFA throughout the 1940s, with his presence often drawing large crowds. In all, he played 217 premiership games at Collingwood and Williamstown combined, and kicked 1,001 goals. Todd was initially credited with 672 goals at Williamstown, but this was amended to 674 in official records in 2017; the original tally meant Todd was thought to have ended his senior career with 999 goals. If Todd's interstate football matches for Victoria, his 1942–1945 RAAF games, and three tour games (the third was in Tasmania in 1946) are considered, then he played 274 matches and kicked 1,242 goals in his overall career.

== Hotelier ==
After his retirement, Todd moved into business in 1951 by purchasing the Hotel Pacific in Lorne.

He later moved to the Gold Coast in Queensland, and died in 1991.

== Cricket ==
During his career, Todd was also a proficient district cricketer for Northcote during the summer, playing 117 first XI games over twelve seasons, taking 204 wickets with his leg breaks and averaging 33.6 with the bat.

== Posthumous recognition ==
In 1997, Todd was initially selected in the Collingwood Team of the Century, but he was removed when one of the selectors, John McHale, son of legendary Collingwood coach Jock, objected to his inclusion in the ceremonial team. According to The Age,

This sentiment towards Todd was a family hangover from 1940 when Jock McHale was one of many Collingwood officials angered by Todd's decision to leave for a much more lucrative package at VFA club Williamstown.

In 2017, he was inducted into the Australian Football Hall of Fame.

In 2007, Todd was back in the news when Carlton centre-half back Bert Deacon's 1947 Brownlow Medal was found in his old shop.

In 2011, Todd was posthumously inducted into the Collingwood Hall of Fame.
