= Chris Sier =

British professor

Chris Sier was a professor at Newcastle University Business School. He had been appointed by the Financial Conduct Authority (FCA) to chair its working group on disclosure of costs and charges for institutional investors.
