= Ken Sier =

Australian rules footballer

Personal information
- Full name: Kenneth Vincent Sier
- Born: 27 January 1922; North Melbourne, Victoria
- Died: 26 February 2001 (aged 79); Heidelberg, Victoria
- Original team: Fitzroy CYMS (CYMSFA)
- Height: 185 cm (6 ft 1 in)
- Weight: 79 kg (174 lb)

Playing career^{1}
Years	Club	Games (Goals)
1940–1947	Fitzroy	59 (61)
1948–1950	Richmond	38 (13)
Total		97 (74)
- ^{1} Playing statistics correct to the end of 1950.

Kenneth Vincent Sier (27 January 1922 – 26 February 2001) was an Australian rules footballer who played with Richmond and Fitzroy in the Victorian Football League (VFL) during the 1940s.

His best year came in 1944 where he kicked 41 goals as a full forward, 3 of them in the 1944 VFL Grand Final victory over his future club Richmond.

In December 1946, Sier was appointed as captain / coach of the Border United Football Club in New South Wales but in January 1947 it was announced that Fitzroy refused Sier a clearance to coach them at £10 per week.

After completing the 1947 season with Fitzroy, Sier transferred to Richmond where he played for the next three seasons. He subsequently coached various country teams, being Captain/Coach of St Arnaud in 1951, Captain/Coach of Wedderburn in 1952 and Captain/Coach of Yarragon in 1953.
