= Lou Barker (footballer, born 1925) =

Australian rules footballer

Personal information
- Full name: Louis Herbert Barker
- Born: 3 July 1925; Footscray, Victoria
- Died: 3 March 2001 (aged 75); Altona North, Victoria
- Original team: Braybrook
- Height: 178 cm (5 ft 10 in)
- Weight: 78 kg (172 lb)

Playing career^{1}
Years	Club	Games (Goals)
1947–49	Footscray	23 (5)
- ^{1} Playing statistics correct to the end of 1949.

Louis Herbert Barker (3 July 1925 – 3 March 2001) was an Australian rules footballer who played with Footscray in the Victorian Football League (VFL).
