= George Nelson (footballer) =

Australian rules footballer, born 1919

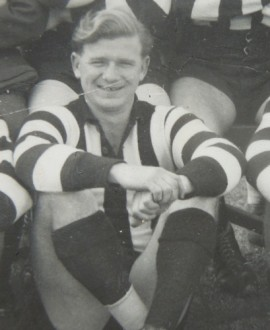
- Nelson during his Collingwood career

Personal information
- Full name: George Anthony Nelson
- Born: 26 April 1919; Collingwood, Victoria
- Died: 9 March 1981 (aged 61); Heidelberg, Victoria
- Original team: Magpies (Sunday League)
- Height: 170 cm (5 ft 7 in)
- Weight: 73 kg (161 lb)

Playing career^{1}
Years	Club	Games (Goals)
1944–45	Collingwood	24 (1)
1946	Richmond	2 (0)
1947	Williamstown (VFA)	12 (0)
- ^{1} Playing statistics correct to the end of 1946.

George Anthony Nelson (26 April 1919 – 9 March 1981) was an Australian rules footballer who played with Collingwood and Richmond in the Victorian Football League (VFL).

Prior to his football career, Nelson served in the Australian Army during World War II.
