= Arthur O'Bryan =

Australian rules footballer

Arthur John O'Bryan

Personal information
- Born: 20 May 1923; Nyarrin, Victoria
- Died: 9 December 1990 (aged 67); Finley, New South Wales
- Original team: Chinkapook
- Height: 183 cm (6 ft 0 in)
- Weight: 83 kg (183 lb)

Playing career^{1}
Years	Club	Games (Goals)
1942–1946	Fitzroy	46 (29)
- ^{1} Playing statistics correct to the end of 1946.

Arthur John O'Bryan (20 May 1923 – 9 December 1990) was an Australian rules footballer who played with Fitzroy in the Victorian Football League (VFL) during the 1940s. He played on the half back flank in his club's 1944 Grand Final triumph.

O'Bryan also served in the Australian Army during World War II.
