= Vic Hill =

Australian rules footballer

Personal information
- Full name: Victor Thomas Hill
- Born: 17 October 1926; Carlton, Victoria
- Died: 3 November 2010 (aged 84)
- Original team: Burnley
- Height: 175 cm (5 ft 9 in)
- Weight: 68 kg (150 lb)

Playing career^{1}
Years	Club	Games (Goals)
1947	Richmond	3 (1)
1948–49	South Melbourne	20 (8)
1949–55	Oakleigh (VFA)	89 (83)
- ^{1} Playing statistics correct to the end of 1955.

Victor Thomas Hill (17 October 1926 – 3 November 2010) was an Australian rules footballer who played with Richmond and South Melbourne in the Victorian Football League (VFL).
