= Jimmy McKnight =

Australian rules footballer

Personal information
- Full name: Jimmy McKnight
- Born: 9 August 1923
- Died: 1 January 1999 (aged 75)
- Height: 170 cm (5 ft 7 in)
- Weight: 66 kg (146 lb)

Playing career^{1}
Years	Club	Games (Goals)
1944–46	South Melbourne	8 (0)
- ^{1} Playing statistics correct to the end of 1946.

Jimmy McKnight (9 August 1923 – 1 January 1999) was an Australian rules footballer who played with South Melbourne in the Victorian Football League (VFL).
