= Keith Cook =

Australian rules footballer

Personal information
- Full name: Keith Eric Cook
- Born: 4 December 1922; Croydon, Victoria
- Died: 16 May 1971 (aged 48)
- Original team: Croydon Football Club
- Height: 180 cm (5 ft 11 in)
- Weight: 77 kg (170 lb)

Playing career^{1}
Years	Club	Games (Goals)
1944–1946	Richmond	26 (1)
- ^{1} Playing statistics correct to the end of 1946.

Keith Eric Cook (4 December 1922 – 16 May 1971) was an Australian rules footballer who played with Richmond in the Victorian Football League (VFL).

Cook was Richmond's reserve in the 1944 VFL Grand Final and replaced injured player Les Jones at half-time. Also in the team that day was Fred Cook, his identical twin brother.

In 1947, Cook was cleared to Camberwell.

He served with the Royal Australian Air Force in World War II.
