= Don Henderson (footballer, born 1930) =

Australian rules footballer (1930–1999)

Personal information
- Full name: Donald Charles Henderson
- Born: 13 July 1930
- Died: 2 January 1999 (aged 68)
- Height: 179 cm (5 ft 10 in)
- Weight: 75 kg (165 lb)

Playing career^{1}
Years	Club	Games (Goals)
1950–51, 1953	Footscray	27 (17)
- ^{1} Playing statistics correct to the end of 1953.

Don Henderson (13 July 1930 – 2 January 1999) was a former Australian rules footballer who played with Footscray in the Victorian Football League (VFL).
