= Billy Power (footballer) =

Australian rules footballer, born 1917

Personal information
- Full name: William Anthony Ward Power
- Born: 21 July 1917; Armadale, Victoria
- Died: 27 November 2002 (aged 85)
- Original team: ICI (Deer Park)
- Height: 180 cm (5 ft 11 in)
- Weight: 75 kg (165 lb)

Playing career^{1}
| Years | Club | Games (Goals) |
| 1940–42, 1946 | Footscray | 12 (0) |
| 1947–52 | Oakleigh | 39 (12) |
- ^{1} Playing statistics correct to the end of 1946.

William Anthony Ward Power (21 July 1917 – 27 November 2002) was an Australian rules footballer who played with Footscray in the Victorian Football League (VFL).

Power's football career was interrupted by his service in the Royal Australian Air Force during World War II.

Following the war, Power played for Victorian Football Association (VFA) club Oakleigh.
