= Jack Sutton =

Australian rules footballer

Personal information
- Full name: Jack Sutton
- Born: 9 December 1921
- Died: 6 July 1998 (aged 76)
- Original team: Essendon Reserves / La Mascotte
- Height: 180 cm (5 ft 11 in)
- Weight: 81 kg (179 lb)

Playing career^{1}
| Years | Club | Games (Goals) |
| 1944–45 | Footscray | 13 (8) |
- ^{1} Playing statistics correct to the end of 1945.

Jack Sutton (9 December 1921 – 6 July 1998) was a former Australian rules footballer who played with Footscray in the Victorian Football League (VFL).
