= Lyal Keighran =

Australian rules footballer

Personal information
- Full name: Lyal Vernon Keighran
- Born: 12 September 1923; Lake Boga, Victoria
- Died: 4 November 2012 (aged 89)
- Original team: Lake Boga
- Height: 188 cm (6 ft 2 in)
- Weight: 89 kg (196 lb)

Playing career^{1}
Years	Club	Games (Goals)
1944, 1947	South Melbourne	10 (6)
- ^{1} Playing statistics correct to the end of 1947.

Lyal Vernon Keighran (12 September 1923 – 4 November 2012) was an Australian rules footballer who played with South Melbourne in the Victorian Football League (VFL). He served in the Australian Army during World War II.
