= Ron Jory =

Australian rules footballer

Personal information
- Full name: Edward Ronald Jory
- Born: 12 May 1925; Castlemaine, Victoria
- Died: 16 March 2013 (aged 87); Beechworth, Victoria
- Original team: Oakleigh (VFA)
- Height: 183 cm (6 ft 0 in)
- Weight: 85 kg (187 lb)
- Positions: Follower, half-forward

Playing career^{1}
Years	Club	Games (Goals)
1945–1946	Essendon	25 (17)
1947–1949	Oakleigh	
- ^{1} Playing statistics correct to the end of 1946.

Career highlights
- Oakleigh captain: 1947; Ararat premiership captain-coach: 1951

Edward Ronald Jory (12 May 1925 – 16 March 2013) was an Australian rules footballer who played with Essendon in the Victorian Football League (VFL).

== Family ==
The son of Edward Ernest Jory (1898–1950), and Catherine Jane Jory (1895–1972), née Thompson, Edward Ronald Jory was born on 12 May 1925. His uncle, Percy Jory, played for St Kilda.

He married Lorna Aileen Holt in 1949.

== Football ==
Jory, who played as a follower and half-forward, joined Essendon from the Oakleigh Seconds in 1945. He played 18 of a possible 20 games for Essendon that year. In the 1946 pre-season, Jory requested a clearance back to Oakleigh, which was refused by the committee. Deciding to stay at Essendon, Jory made seven appearances in 1946, a season in which he was troubled by a leg injury and found it difficult to break into a side which would end the year as premiers.

From 1947 to 1949, Jory played back at Oakleigh, which he captained in the first of those years. He was a member of the Oakleigh side that lost to Williamstown in the 1949 VFA Grand Final, by just three points.

Jory played briefly for Yarrawonga in 1950, then was appointed coach of Wimmera Football League club Ararat for 1951.

He was amongst Ararat's best players in their 12-point win over Minyip in the 1951 Grand Final, with five goals. After two more seasons leading Ararat, Jory joined St Arnaud in the North Central Football League, as coach, but was, at his request, released by the club before the beginning of the 1954 season.
