= Lou Salvas =

Australian rules footballer

Personal information
- Full name: Louis George Anthony Salvas
- Born: 17 August 1921; Williamstown, Victoria
- Died: 2 February 2005 (aged 83); Box Hill, Victoria
- Original team: Auburn
- Height: 188 cm (6 ft 2 in)
- Weight: 86 kg (190 lb)

Playing career^{1}
Years	Club	Games (Goals)
1941	Williamstown (VFA)	11 (14)
1943	Hawthorn	5 (7)
1946–51	Williamstown (VFA)	91 (107)
- ^{1} Playing statistics correct to the end of 1951.

Louis George Anthony Salvas (17 August 1921 – 2 February 2005) was an Australian rules footballer who played with Hawthorn in the Victorian Football League (VFL).
