= Gordon Cameron (footballer) =

Australian rules footballer

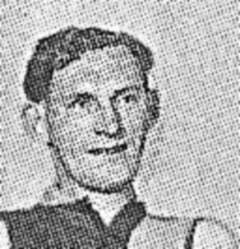
- Cameron in 1940

Personal information
- Full name: Gordon Alexander Cameron
- Born: 25 February 1922
- Died: 29 December 1995 (aged 73)
- Original team: Laverton
- Height: 178 cm (5 ft 10 in)
- Weight: 81 kg (179 lb)
- Position: Midfielder

Playing career^{1}
Years	Club	Games (Goals)
1940, 1946	Carlton	17 (1)
- ^{1} Playing statistics correct to the end of 1946.

Gordon Alexander Cameron (25 February 1922 – 29 December 1995) was an Australian rules footballer who played with Carlton in the Victorian Football League (VFL).
