= Don Henderson (footballer, born 1918) =

Australian rules footballer (1918–2010)

Personal information
- Full name: Donald Stewart Henderson
- Born: 8 August 1918; Prahran, Victoria
- Died: 13 September 2010 (aged 92)
- Original team: Parkside
- Height: 183 cm (6 ft 0 in)
- Weight: 83 kg (183 lb)

Playing career^{1}
Years	Club	Games (Goals)
1944	Footscray	11 (2)
- ^{1} Playing statistics correct to the end of 1944.

Donald Stewart Henderson (8 August 1918 – 13 September 2010) was an Australian rules footballer who played with Footscray in the Victorian Football League (VFL).
