= Alan Randall (footballer) =

Australian rules footballer

Personal information
- Full name: Alan Thomas Randall
- Born: 24 April 1925
- Died: 24 May 2000 (aged 75)
- Height: 175 cm (5 ft 9 in)
- Weight: 67 kg (148 lb)

Playing career^{1}
Years	Club	Games (Goals)
1944–1945	Essendon	9 (0)
- ^{1} Playing statistics correct to the end of 1945.

Alan Thomas Randall (24 April 1925 – 24 May 2000) was an Australian rules footballer who played for the Essendon Football Club in the Victorian Football League (VFL).
