= Alex Boyle =

Australian rules footballer (1929–2018)

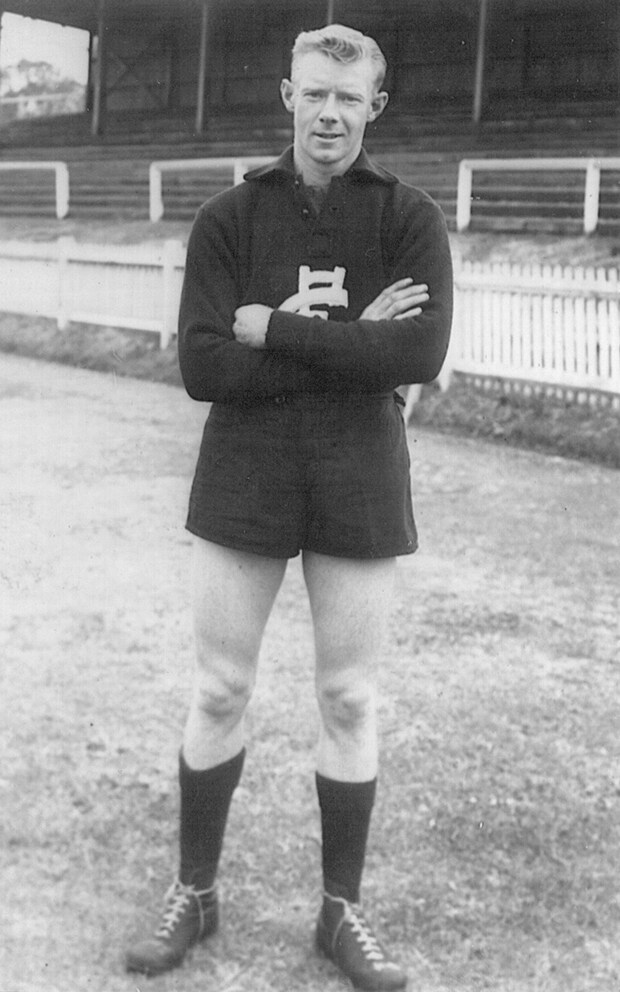

Personal information
- Full name: Alexander William Boyle
- Born: 14 December 1929
- Died: 29 July 2018 (aged 88); Frankston, Victoria
- Original team: Oakleigh
- Height: 183 cm (6 ft 0 in)
- Weight: 82 kg (181 lb)

Playing career^{1}
Years	Club	Games (Goals)
1953–1954	Carlton	8 (0)
- ^{1} Playing statistics correct to the end of 1954.

Alexander William Boyle (14 December 1929 – 29 July 2018) was an Australian rules footballer who played for the Carlton Football Club in the Victorian Football League (VFL).
