= Alf Sampson =

Australian rules footballer, born 1912

Personal information
- Full name: Alfred Birch Sampson
- Born: 27 May 1912; Rupanyup, Victoria
- Died: 17 January 2001 (aged 88)
- Original team: Paisley / Rupanyup
- Height: 185 cm (6 ft 1 in)
- Weight: 83 kg (183 lb)
- Position: Fullback

Playing career^{1}
Years	Club	Games (Goals)
1935–36, 38–42, 46	Footscray	60 (4)
1947–51	Williamstown (VFA)	99 (0)
- ^{1} Playing statistics correct to the end of 1951.

Alfred Birch Sampson (27 May 1912 – 17 January 2001) was an Australian rules footballer who played for the Footscray Football Club in the Victorian Football League (VFL).

== Family ==
The son of John Sampson (1884–1942) and Grace Ivy Sampson, née Birch (1884–1954), Alfred Birch was born at Rupanyup on 27 May 1912. He was the younger brother of fellow Footscray player John Sampson.

== War service ==
Sampson later served in the Royal Australian Air Force during World War II.
