= George Smeaton (footballer) =

Australian rules footballer, born 1917

Personal information
- Full name: George Frederick Smeaton
- Nickname: Brown Bomber
- Born: 27 May 1917; Carlton, Victoria
- Died: 9 June 1978 (aged 61); Heidelberg, Victoria
- Original team: Brighton Street School
- Height: 183 cm (6 ft 0 in)
- Weight: 85.5 kg (188 lb)

Playing career^{1}
Years	Club	Games (Goals)
1935–1946	Richmond	149 (36)
1948–1950	Oakleigh (VFA)	

Representative team honours
Years	Team	Games (Goals)
	Victoria	1

Coaching career
Years	Club	Games (W–L–D)
1947	Latrobe (NWFU)	
1948–1954	Oakleigh (VFA)	
- ^{1} Playing statistics correct to the end of 1950.

Career highlights
- Richmond life membership 1944

George Frederick Smeaton (27 May 1917 – 9 June 1978) was an Australian rules footballer who played for the Richmond Football Club in the Victorian Football League (VFL) between 1935 and 1942 and then again from 1944 to 1946.

Smeaton was nicknamed the "Brown Bomber", a nickname borrowed from Joe Louis, and was described by Jack Dyer as the toughest player he played with.

He left Richmond in 1947 to take up a coaching position with Latrobe in Northern Tasmania.

He later returned to Victoria and had a successful coaching career in the Victorian Football Association (VFA) where he led Oakleigh to three Grand Finals, winning premierships in 1950 and 1952 and losing the 1949 Grand Final due to a late goal by Williamstown.

He was also an established cricketer, captaining the Victorian school boys cricket team.
