= Jack Danckert =

Australian rules footballer

Personal information
- Full name: Jack Danckert
- Born: 10 July 1922
- Died: 26 January 2000 (aged 77)
- Original team: Middle Park (CBL)
- Height: 178 cm (5 ft 10 in)
- Weight: 80 kg (176 lb)

Playing career^{1}
| Years | Club | Games (Goals) |
| 1944–1947 | South Melbourne | 13 (0) |
- ^{1} Playing statistics correct to the end of 1947.

Jack Danckert (10 July 1922 – 26 January 2000) was an Australian rules footballer who played with South Melbourne in the Victorian Football League (VFL) during the 1940s.

Danckert was a defender who was unable to put together regular appearances while at South Melbourne, never playing more than five games in a single season. He played as a half back flanker in the 1945 VFL Grand Final against Carlton, in what was just his ninth league appearance. The grand final, which South Melbourne lost, is referred to as being a "Bloodbath" and Danckert was one of the victims when he was felled by Carlton ruckman Rod McLean.

He didn't feature at all in the 1946 VFL season and played just four games in 1947. The following year he signed with Victorian Football Association (VFA) club Williamstown and was part of a swap for Reg Harley. Danckert made 64 appearances for the Seagulls in three seasons without kicking a goal. He was a back pocket defender in Williamstown's 1949 premiership team and won their "Best and Fairest" award in 1950. He was a VFA representative at the 1950 Brisbane Carnival. Danckert also played in Williamstown's losing 1948 grand final team but won a trophy for equal most effective player in 1948 and the most consistent player in 1949. He retired in 1951 due to his employment and then transferred to Tooronga in 1952

Danckert later joined the administration of the Mordialloc Football Club, and became one of its two delegates to the VFA Board of Management. Famously as delegate, Danckert was unable to attend the VFA meeting on 2 December 1960 to lodge Mordialloc's second vote against partitioning of the Association into two divisions, because his wife was expecting their child that night; the change was ultimately passed by exactly the three-quarters majority it required, and Danckert's vote (or that of a proxy, which the club failed to arrange) could have defeated the motion.
