= Ray Finn (footballer) =

Australian rules footballer

Personal information
- Full name: Ray Finn
- Born: 2 January 1926
- Died: 23 June 2000 (aged 74)
- Original team: Oakleigh Juniors
- Height: 168 cm (5 ft 6 in)
- Weight: 72 kg (159 lb)

Playing career^{1}
Years	Club	Games (Goals)
1944–45	Essendon	10 (14)
- ^{1} Playing statistics correct to the end of 1945.

Ray Finn (2 January 1926 – 23 June 2000) was an Australian rules footballer who played with Essendon in the Victorian Football League (VFL).
