= Clive Watson =

Australian rules footballer

Personal information
- Full name: Clive Thomas Edward Watson
- Born: 12 April 1924; Carlton, Victoria
- Died: 5 January 1979 (aged 54); Sorrento, Victoria
- Original team: Richmond United
- Height: 173 cm (5 ft 8 in)
- Weight: 66 kg (146 lb)

Playing career^{1}
| Years | Club | Games (Goals) |
| 1948 | Richmond | 4 (1) |
- ^{1} Playing statistics correct to the end of 1948.

Clive Thomas Edward Watson (12 April 1924 – 5 January 1979) was an Australian rules footballer who played with Richmond in the Victorian Football League (VFL).
