= 1944 VFL season =

48th season of the Victorian Football League (VFL)

1944 VFL premiership season
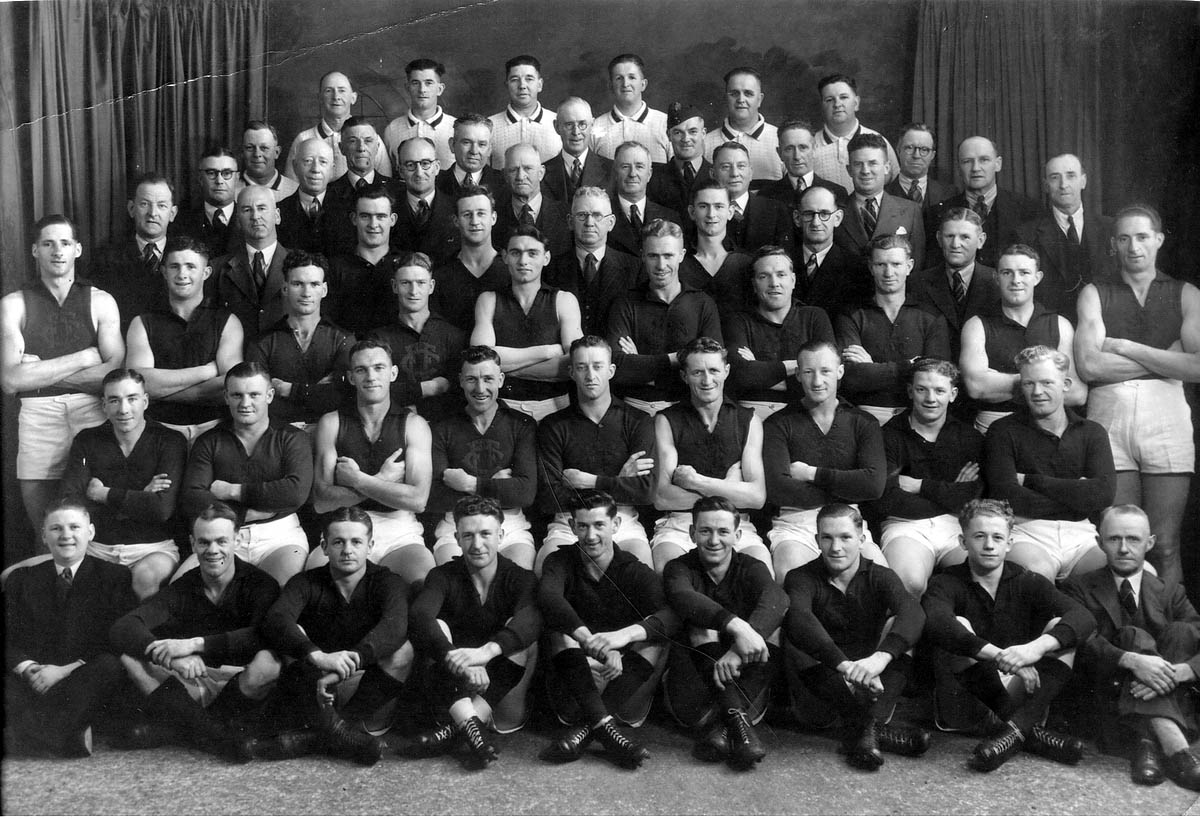
- Fitzroy Football Club, premier team
- Teams: 12
- Premiers: Fitzroy; 8th premiership
- Minor premiers: Richmond; 5th minor premiership
- Brownlow Medallist: Not awarded
- Leading goalkicker medallist: Fred Fanning (Melbourne)
- Matches played: 112
- Highest: 43,000

The 1944 VFL season was the 48th season of the Victorian Football League (VFL), the highest level senior Australian rules football competition in Victoria.

All twelve of the league's clubs competed, with Geelong returning after two years in recess due to wartime travel restrictions. The season ran from 6 May until 30 September, and comprised an 18-game home-and-away season followed by a finals series featuring the top four clubs.

The premiership was won by the Fitzroy Football Club for the eighth and final time in its history, after it defeated Richmond by 15 points in the VFL Grand Final.

== Background ==
The wartime travel restrictions that had forced Geelong into recess the previous two years were relaxed, and Geelong rejoined the competition. As a result, the VFL competition once again consisted of twelve teams of 18 on-the-field players each, plus one substitute player, known as the 19th man. A player could be substituted for any reason; however, once substituted, a player could not return to the field of play under any circumstances.

Teams played each other in a home-and-away season of 18 rounds; and, as had been the case in 1926 and 1927, matches 12 to 18 were "irregular", with 12 to 17 being the "home-and-way reverse" of matches 1 to 6, and match 18 the "home-and-way reverse" of match 11.

The determination of the 1944 season's fixtures were greatly complicated by the fact that, although the Western Oval and the Junction Oval were now available to the VFL, the Melbourne Cricket Ground and the Lake Oval were still appropriated for military use and, because of this, Melbourne was sharing the Punt Road Oval with Richmond as its home ground, and South Melbourne was sharing the Junction Oval with St Kilda as its home ground.

Once the 18 round home-and-away season had finished, the 1944 VFL Premiers were determined by the specific format and conventions of the Page–McIntyre system.

== Home-and-away season ==
=== Round 1 ===
Home team	Home team score	Away team	Away team score	Venue	Crowd	Date
Melbourne	14.8 (92)	Richmond	19.18 (132)	Punt Road Oval	15,000	6 May 1944
Footscray	15.23 (113)	Geelong	8.7 (55)	Western Oval	9,000	6 May 1944
Fitzroy	11.16 (82)	St Kilda	10.13 (73)	Brunswick Street Oval	9,000	6 May 1944
Hawthorn	9.14 (68)	Essendon	15.16 (106)	Glenferrie Oval	12,000	6 May 1944
North Melbourne	9.11 (65)	Collingwood	14.17 (101)	Arden Street Oval	6,000	6 May 1944
South Melbourne	13.10 (88)	Carlton	9.7 (61)	Junction Oval	20,000	6 May 1944

=== Round 2 ===
Home team	Home team score	Away team	Away team score	Venue	Crowd	Date
Geelong	9.11 (65)	South Melbourne	11.18 (84)	Kardinia Park	8,000	13 May 1944
Essendon	17.18 (120)	Melbourne	16.4 (100)	Windy Hill	12,000	13 May 1944
Collingwood	11.17 (83)	Fitzroy	19.17 (131)	Victoria Park	15,500	13 May 1944
Carlton	18.16 (124)	Hawthorn	9.14 (68)	Princes Park	11,000	13 May 1944
Richmond	18.11 (119)	North Melbourne	15.9 (99)	Punt Road Oval	15,000	13 May 1944
St Kilda	12.17 (89)	Footscray	10.14 (74)	Junction Oval	15,000	13 May 1944

=== Round 3 ===
Home team	Home team score	Away team	Away team score	Venue	Crowd	Date
Fitzroy	16.11 (107)	North Melbourne	11.16 (82)	Brunswick Street Oval	12,000	20 May 1944
Essendon	16.14 (110)	Richmond	22.19 (151)	Windy Hill	21,000	20 May 1944
South Melbourne	9.10 (64)	St Kilda	7.10 (52)	Junction Oval	20,000	20 May 1944
Hawthorn	22.12 (144)	Geelong	13.13 (91)	Glenferrie Oval	8,000	20 May 1944
Footscray	16.9 (105)	Collingwood	13.19 (97)	Western Oval	11,000	20 May 1944
Melbourne	12.5 (77)	Carlton	14.8 (92)	Punt Road Oval	15,000	20 May 1944

=== Round 4 ===
Home team	Home team score	Away team	Away team score	Venue	Crowd	Date
Geelong	10.9 (69)	Melbourne	22.10 (142)	Kardinia Park	8,000	27 May 1944
Collingwood	11.18 (84)	South Melbourne	12.18 (90)	Victoria Park	13,000	27 May 1944
Carlton	13.17 (95)	Essendon	14.9 (93)	Princes Park	18,000	27 May 1944
St Kilda	9.12 (66)	Hawthorn	11.7 (73)	Junction Oval	10,000	27 May 1944
North Melbourne	15.14 (104)	Footscray	9.16 (70)	Arden Street Oval	10,000	27 May 1944
Richmond	14.13 (97)	Fitzroy	7.9 (51)	Punt Road Oval	29,000	27 May 1944

=== Round 5 ===
Home team	Home team score	Away team	Away team score	Venue	Crowd	Date
Melbourne	10.13 (73)	St Kilda	13.8 (86)	Punt Road Oval	8,000	3 June 1944
Essendon	17.14 (116)	Geelong	11.14 (80)	Windy Hill	7,000	3 June 1944
Carlton	16.12 (108)	Richmond	14.8 (92)	Princes Park	28,000	3 June 1944
South Melbourne	10.12 (72)	North Melbourne	10.13 (73)	Junction Oval	15,000	3 June 1944
Footscray	8.15 (63)	Fitzroy	8.10 (58)	Western Oval	9,000	3 June 1944
Hawthorn	8.9 (57)	Collingwood	10.13 (73)	Glenferrie Oval	11,000	3 June 1944

=== Round 6 ===
Home team	Home team score	Away team	Away team score	Venue	Crowd	Date
Fitzroy	14.7 (91)	South Melbourne	10.17 (77)	Brunswick Street Oval	20,000	10 June 1944
Collingwood	10.9 (69)	Melbourne	15.9 (99)	Victoria Park	10,000	10 June 1944
North Melbourne	21.16 (142)	Hawthorn	17.11 (113)	Arden Street Oval	10,000	10 June 1944
Richmond	19.11 (125)	Footscray	18.17 (125)	Punt Road Oval	22,000	10 June 1944
St Kilda	9.17 (71)	Essendon	9.17 (71)	Junction Oval	19,000	10 June 1944
Geelong	5.10 (40)	Carlton	13.25 (103)	Kardinia Park	8,000	10 June 1944

=== Round 7 ===
Home team	Home team score	Away team	Away team score	Venue	Crowd	Date
Footscray	9.13 (67)	South Melbourne	8.10 (58)	Western Oval	15,000	17 June 1944
Fitzroy	14.13 (97)	Hawthorn	7.10 (52)	Brunswick Street Oval	10,000	17 June 1944
Collingwood	12.21 (93)	Essendon	9.10 (64)	Victoria Park	10,000	17 June 1944
North Melbourne	15.20 (110)	Melbourne	12.10 (82)	Arden Street Oval	12,000	17 June 1944
Richmond	25.23 (173)	Geelong	9.2 (56)	Punt Road Oval	10,000	17 June 1944
St Kilda	6.12 (48)	Carlton	15.13 (103)	Junction Oval	23,000	17 June 1944

=== Round 8 ===
Home team	Home team score	Away team	Away team score	Venue	Crowd	Date
Geelong	9.13 (67)	St Kilda	13.14 (92)	Kardinia Park	7,000	24 June 1944
Essendon	21.18 (144)	North Melbourne	8.12 (60)	Windy Hill	16,000	24 June 1944
Carlton	17.12 (114)	Collingwood	12.11 (83)	Princes Park	21,000	24 June 1944
South Melbourne	11.11 (77)	Richmond	17.10 (112)	Junction Oval	25,000	24 June 1944
Hawthorn	9.10 (64)	Footscray	14.18 (102)	Glenferrie Oval	12,000	24 June 1944
Melbourne	7.10 (52)	Fitzroy	10.17 (77)	Punt Road Oval	13,000	24 June 1944

=== Round 9 ===
Home team	Home team score	Away team	Away team score	Venue	Crowd	Date
Richmond	11.18 (84)	St Kilda	7.11 (53)	Punt Road Oval	16,000	1 July 1944
Footscray	8.15 (63)	Melbourne	8.13 (61)	Western Oval	13,000	1 July 1944
Collingwood	15.12 (102)	Geelong	9.13 (67)	Victoria Park	6,000	1 July 1944
South Melbourne	15.12 (102)	Hawthorn	11.11 (77)	Junction Oval	12,000	1 July 1944
Fitzroy	12.11 (83)	Essendon	11.17 (83)	Brunswick Street Oval	17,000	1 July 1944
North Melbourne	11.15 (81)	Carlton	7.10 (52)	Arden Street Oval	16,000	1 July 1944

=== Round 10 ===
Home team	Home team score	Away team	Away team score	Venue	Crowd	Date
Melbourne	10.10 (70)	South Melbourne	9.13 (67)	Punt Road Oval	10,000	8 July 1944
Hawthorn	11.9 (75)	Richmond	13.16 (94)	Glenferrie Oval	11,000	8 July 1944
Geelong	13.9 (87)	North Melbourne	21.14 (140)	Kardinia Park	6,500	8 July 1944
Essendon	14.16 (100)	Footscray	8.13 (61)	Windy Hill	13,000	8 July 1944
Carlton	11.15 (81)	Fitzroy	6.15 (51)	Princes Park	17,000	8 July 1944
St Kilda	17.11 (113)	Collingwood	6.9 (45)	Junction Oval	10,000	8 July 1944

=== Round 11 ===
Home team	Home team score	Away team	Away team score	Venue	Crowd	Date
North Melbourne	11.20 (86)	St Kilda	7.11 (53)	Arden Street Oval	10,000	15 July 1944
Hawthorn	7.10 (52)	Melbourne	22.25 (157)	Glenferrie Oval	10,000	15 July 1944
Fitzroy	25.29 (179)	Geelong	8.8 (56)	Brunswick Street Oval	7,000	15 July 1944
South Melbourne	7.15 (57)	Essendon	15.16 (106)	Junction Oval	18,000	15 July 1944
Richmond	16.17 (113)	Collingwood	9.13 (67)	Punt Road Oval	15,000	15 July 1944
Footscray	13.8 (86)	Carlton	12.11 (83)	Western Oval	17,000	15 July 1944

=== Round 12 ===
Home team	Home team score	Away team	Away team score	Venue	Crowd	Date
Essendon	19.18 (132)	Hawthorn	3.7 (25)	Windy Hill	8,000	22 July 1944
Collingwood	13.11 (89)	North Melbourne	10.10 (70)	Victoria Park	11,000	22 July 1944
Carlton	10.14 (74)	South Melbourne	8.12 (60)	Princes Park	15,000	22 July 1944
Richmond	17.8 (110)	Melbourne	9.15 (69)	Punt Road Oval	19,000	22 July 1944
Geelong	11.11 (77)	Footscray	14.17 (101)	Kardinia Park	7,000	22 July 1944
St Kilda	12.16 (88)	Fitzroy	8.14 (62)	Junction Oval	14,000	22 July 1944

=== Round 13 ===
Home team	Home team score	Away team	Away team score	Venue	Crowd	Date
North Melbourne	11.21 (87)	Richmond	14.2 (86)	Arden Street Oval	22,000	29 July 1944
Footscray	14.15 (99)	St Kilda	11.10 (76)	Western Oval	13,000	29 July 1944
South Melbourne	8.30 (78)	Geelong	8.8 (56)	Junction Oval	7,000	29 July 1944
Melbourne	11.12 (78)	Essendon	14.14 (98)	Punt Road Oval	11,000	29 July 1944
Fitzroy	12.17 (89)	Collingwood	4.14 (38)	Brunswick Street Oval	13,000	29 July 1944
Hawthorn	10.2 (62)	Carlton	13.28 (106)	Glenferrie Oval	11,000	29 July 1944

=== Round 14 ===
Home team	Home team score	Away team	Away team score	Venue	Crowd	Date
St Kilda	7.12 (54)	South Melbourne	10.19 (79)	Junction Oval	8,000	5 August 1944
Geelong	11.20 (86)	Hawthorn	9.7 (61)	Kardinia Park	7,000	5 August 1944
Collingwood	8.12 (60)	Footscray	15.9 (99)	Victoria Park	9,000	5 August 1944
Carlton	4.14 (38)	Melbourne	8.6 (54)	Princes Park	10,000	5 August 1944
North Melbourne	11.12 (78)	Fitzroy	15.11 (101)	Arden Street Oval	14,000	5 August 1944
Richmond	11.17 (83)	Essendon	12.15 (87)	Punt Road Oval	26,000	5 August 1944

=== Round 15 ===
Home team	Home team score	Away team	Away team score	Venue	Crowd	Date
Hawthorn	12.16 (88)	St Kilda	12.16 (88)	Glenferrie Oval	6,000	12 August 1944
Footscray	12.6 (78)	North Melbourne	11.8 (74)	Western Oval	16,000	12 August 1944
Fitzroy	16.10 (106)	Richmond	7.14 (56)	Brunswick Street Oval	22,000	12 August 1944
Melbourne	8.21 (69)	Geelong	8.8 (56)	Punt Road Oval	4,500	12 August 1944
South Melbourne	16.10 (106)	Collingwood	8.22 (70)	Junction Oval	7,500	12 August 1944
Essendon	6.9 (45)	Carlton	14.20 (104)	Windy Hill	20,000	12 August 1944

=== Round 16 ===
Home team	Home team score	Away team	Away team score	Venue	Crowd	Date
North Melbourne	6.12 (48)	South Melbourne	13.16 (94)	Arden Street Oval	7,000	19 August 1944
Fitzroy	13.14 (92)	Footscray	12.18 (90)	Brunswick Street Oval	20,000	19 August 1944
Collingwood	18.20 (128)	Hawthorn	7.14 (56)	Victoria Park	5,000	19 August 1944
St Kilda	13.13 (91)	Melbourne	7.10 (52)	Junction Oval	8,000	19 August 1944
Geelong	10.12 (72)	Essendon	13.19 (97)	Kardinia Park	8,250	19 August 1944
Richmond	11.16 (82)	Carlton	8.16 (64)	Punt Road Oval	38,000	19 August 1944

=== Round 17 ===
Home team	Home team score	Away team	Away team score	Venue	Crowd	Date
Hawthorn	12.12 (84)	North Melbourne	15.19 (109)	Glenferrie Oval	5,000	26 August 1944
Footscray	5.14 (44)	Richmond	9.15 (69)	Western Oval	26,500	26 August 1944
Essendon	28.21 (189)	St Kilda	12.11 (83)	Windy Hill	8,000	26 August 1944
Carlton	23.28 (166)	Geelong	8.12 (60)	Princes Park	7,000	26 August 1944
South Melbourne	8.13 (61)	Fitzroy	17.14 (116)	Junction Oval	16,000	26 August 1944
Melbourne	11.17 (83)	Collingwood	15.12 (102)	Punt Road Oval	8,000	26 August 1944

=== Round 18 ===
Home team	Home team score	Away team	Away team score	Venue	Crowd	Date
Essendon	17.24 (126)	South Melbourne	6.8 (44)	Windy Hill	11,000	2 September 1944
Collingwood	10.8 (68)	Richmond	15.18 (108)	Victoria Park	14,000	2 September 1944
Carlton	13.10 (88)	Footscray	12.17 (89)	Princes Park	34,000	2 September 1944
St Kilda	12.10 (82)	North Melbourne	16.15 (111)	Junction Oval	7,000	2 September 1944
Melbourne	14.27 (111)	Hawthorn	6.13 (49)	Punt Road Oval	4,000	2 September 1944
Geelong	10.10 (70)	Fitzroy	15.15 (105)	Kardinia Park	8,000	2 September 1944

== Ladder ==
(P)	Premiers
	Qualified for finals

#	Team	P	W	L	D	PF	PA	%	Pts
1	Richmond	18	13	4	1	1886	1438	131.2	54
2	Fitzroy (P)	18	13	4	1	1678	1280	131.1	54
3	Essendon	18	12	4	2	1887	1408	134.0	52
4	Footscray	18	12	5	1	1529	1430	106.9	50
5	Carlton	18	12	6	0	1656	1259	131.5	48
6	North Melbourne	18	10	8	0	1619	1614	100.3	40
7	South Melbourne	18	9	9	0	1358	1402	96.9	36
8	Melbourne	18	7	11	0	1521	1481	102.7	28
9	St Kilda	18	6	10	2	1358	1502	90.4	28
10	Collingwood	18	7	11	0	1452	1629	89.1	28
11	Hawthorn	18	2	15	1	1268	1914	66.2	10
12	Geelong	18	1	17	0	1210	2065	58.6	4

Rules for classification: 1. premiership points; 2. percentage; 3. points for
Average score: 85.3
Source: AFL Tables

== Finals series ==
=== Semi-finals ===
Home team	Score	Away team	Score	Venue	Crowd	Date
Essendon	14.17 (101)	Footscray	8.4 (52)	Junction Oval	24,542	9 September
Richmond	10.10 (70)	Fitzroy	11.15 (81)	Junction Oval	32,000	16 September

=== Preliminary finals ===
Home team	Score	Away team	Score	Venue	Crowd	Date
Richmond	16.12 (108)	Essendon	12.15 (87)	Junction Oval	38,000	23 September

=== Grand final ===
Home team	Score	Away team	Score	Venue	Crowd	Date
Fitzroy	9.12 (66)	Richmond	7.9 (51)	Junction Oval	43,000	30 September

== Season notes ==
- Geelong resumed its place in the VFL competition. Although the lifting of wartime rail and road transport restrictions removed one impediment to Geelong's immediate return to the VFL competition, as the club's committee had paid the £100 annual affiliation fees to the VFL in 1942 and 1943 out of their own pockets in order to keep Geelong "in the game", the VFL claimed that Geelong Football Club owed the VFL £1,000 and that it would not consider its application for readmission until the debt was repaid, which was raised amongst the committeemen and supporters. After an extended and heated meeting, with matters such as the extra costs to each of the other eleven teams associated with their travel to Geelong and Geelong's perceived lack of competitiveness due to its depleted playing list (the reality of this concern is attested by the fact that Geelong only won 7 of its 57 games in seasons 1944, 1945, and 1946) influencing the VFL delegates, a majority (but not a unanimous majority) of the delegates voted in favour of Geelong's readmission.
- The VFL returned to having twelve teams. The next time this would change would be forty-three years later in 1987 when West Coast and Brisbane were admitted as part of national expansion.
- The late arrival of the train from Melbourne delayed the start of Geelong's first 1944 home match for more than an hour, with the game eventually starting at 3.32pm.
- During the Round 10 game between St Kilda and Essendon, thousands of spectators stormed the lightly patronised Members Reserve Grandstand after heavy rain started to fall. Officials made no attempt to stop them.
- The VFA and the VFL actively discussed the prospects of merging the two competitions. There was groundswell support for a common set of rules and common control over the game, after the upheaval which had followed the Association legalising throwing the ball and ceasing to recognise the validity of VFL transfer clearances in 1938. However, the issues of representation at board level, Australian National Football Council representation, and a promotion and relegation structure between the VFA and VFL meant that the talks eventually failed.
- The Round 13 match between North Melbourne and Richmond is the only match in which a team has scored three goals fewer than its opponent, but scored enough behinds to win the match. In the same round, South Melbourne defeated Geelong by 22 behinds, the largest winning margin between teams which kicked the same number of goals.
- Richmond won the minor premiership by the narrowest margin ever, after finishing level on premiership points with Fitzroy, but ahead on percentage by only 0.06%pts – in absolute terms, a single extra point at any time during the season could have changed the outcome.
- Fourth place on the ladder was decided directly by the Round 18 match between Carlton and Footscray, who were placed fourth and fifth on the ladder at the start of the round. Scores were level when the final bell went – a draw was enough for Carlton to make the finals – but Footscray's Harry Hickey had a kick after the siren from 50m which only just travelled the distance, and went through off hands for the winning behind, which saw Footscray reach the finals.
- Richmond's centreman Jack Broadstock was reported for having "kicked or intended to kick" Fitzroy's half-forward flanker Noel Price in the Second Semi-Final, and he was suspended for eight weeks. The Richmond First Eighteen were so incensed at Broadstock's suspension that they decided to forfeit the Preliminary Final against Essendon. It was only after Richmond President Harry Dyke told them that he would field the Second Eighteen rather than forfeit the match that the senior players agreed to play.
- Fitzroy won its eighth (and last) premiership at the Junction Oval on a hot, blustery day in which many spectators walked long distances to and from the venue on account of a tram strike.

== Awards ==
- The 1944 VFL Premiership team was Fitzroy's last premiership, and its last Grand Final appearance. The club would fail to achieve either feat again before merging at the end of 1996.
- The VFL's leading goalkicker was Fred Fanning of Melbourne with 87 goals.
- No Brownlow Medal was awarded in 1944.
- Geelong took the "wooden spoon" in 1944.
- The seconds premiership was won by Fitzroy. Fitzroy 11.12 (78) defeated Collingwood 9.9 (63) in the Grand Final, played as a stand-alone match on Saturday 23 September at Victoria Park before a crowd of 7,500.

== See also ==
- List of VFL debuts in 1944

== Sources ==
- 1944 VFL season at AFL Tables
- 1944 VFL season at Australian Football
