= Oakleigh Football Club =

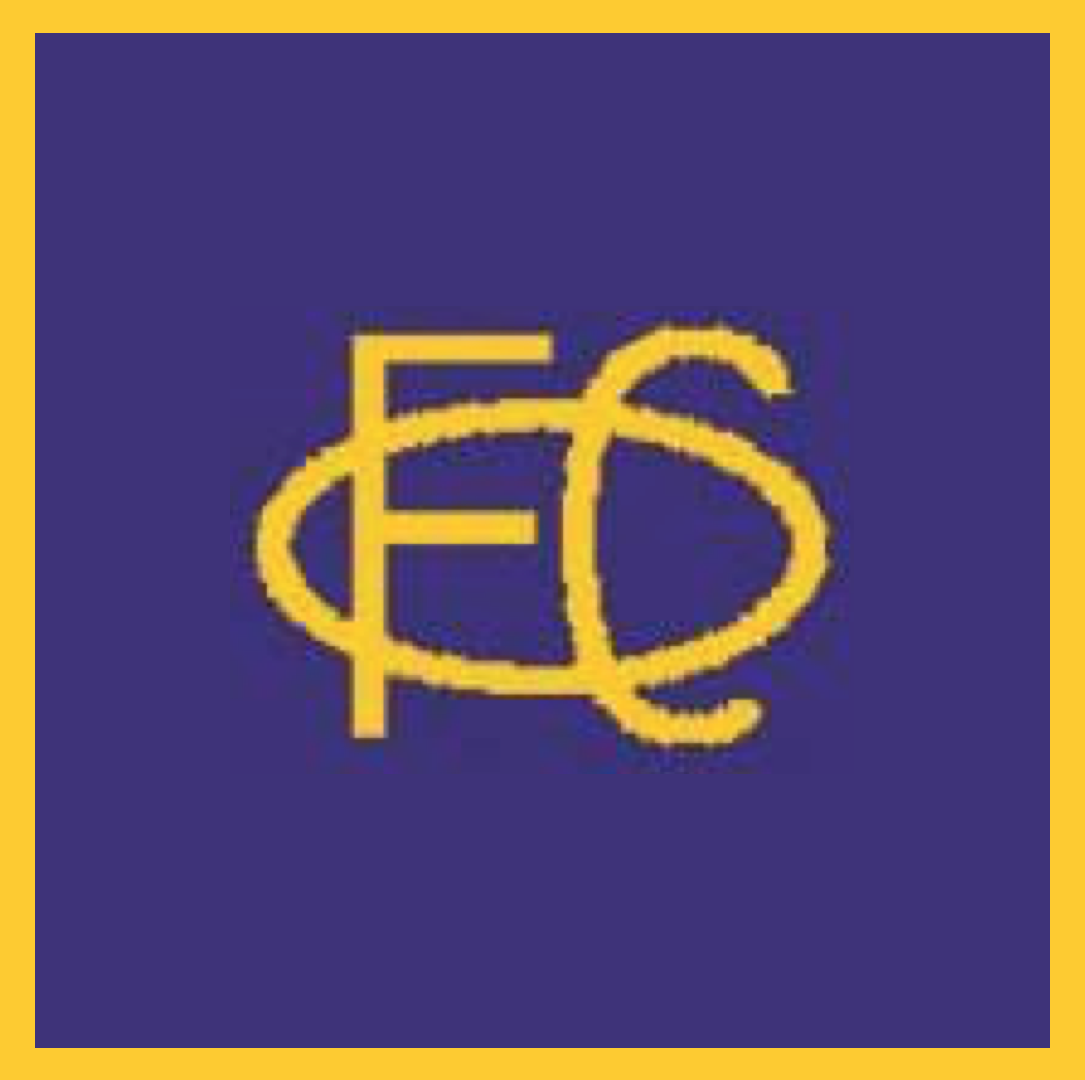

Names
- Full name: Oakleigh Football Club
- Nickname(s): Devils, Oaks, Purple and Golds

Club details
- Founded: 1891; 135 years ago
- Dissolved: Late 1994; 32 years ago
- Colours: Purple Gold
- Competition: Melbourne District Association (1891–1928); Victorian Football Association (1929–1994)
- Premierships: VFA Div 1 (6): 1930; 1931; 1950; 1952; 1960; 1972; VFA Div 2 (2): 1967; 1988; MDA (3): 1907; 1924; 1928
- Ground: Warrawee Park

Uniforms
Home

The Oakleigh Football Club, nicknamed the Devils, was an Australian rules football club based in the Melbourne suburb of Oakleigh that competed in the Victorian Football Association (VFA) from 1929 until 1994.

Oakleigh wore purple guernseys with a gold monogram, thus giving them their original nickname, the Purple and Golds.

== History ==
The club was formed in 1891 and after having success in the Melbourne Districts Association (premierships in 1907, 1924, & 1928), they were one of two teams admitted into the VFA in 1929, the other being Sandringham.

With former Essendon star player and coach, and future Fitzroy and Carlton coach Frank Maher in charge they won a premiership in just their second season with a 9-point win over Northcote in a very spiteful game, 9.6 (60) to 7.9 (51). The game had erupted into full scale violence during the last term when a Northcote defender elbowed an Oakleigh forward in the face and an all in brawl, involving a number of spectators as well as most players, ensued. Under the rules of the time, Oakleigh would have been able to challenge Northcote the following week if they had lost this game as they had finished as minor premiers after the home and away matches preceding the finals series. The two sides met once more in the Grand Final the following year and Oakleigh again got the better of Northcote, winning by 3 points despite kicking inaccurately, 10.14 (74) to 11.5 (71).

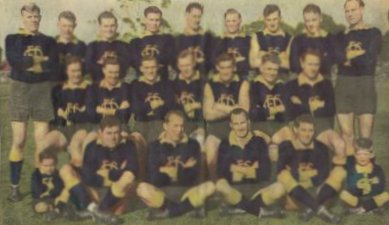
The 1950 premiership side

It would be the last time the club saw finals football until 1949 when they made it all the way to the Grand Final before losing when a Williamstown player kicked a goal with only seconds to play to put his team in front. They earned the minor premiership the following season and outplayed Port Melbourne to win their third premiership. In 1952 the teams met again in the Grand Final and Oakleigh won comfortably.

Another drought ensued and Oakleigh didn't make the finals again until 1959. They won their 5th premiership in 1960 despite not being able to play at their home ground which was having resurfacing work.

In 1966 Oakleigh was demoted to the second division by finishing bottom of the first division but won the second division premiership by defeating Geelong West in the Grand Final in 1967 and returned to the top flight for 1968. In the following decade they made consecutive Grand Final appearances in 1972, 1973 and 1974; The 1972 grand final saw them defeat Dandenong in a high scoring match, 25.17 (167) to 18.15 (123). The success from this saw the club secure a lucrative three-year $80k sponsorship deal from Transtours in 1975, making it financially the most well-backed club in the Association; but in spite of this its on-field performances quickly deteriorated and the club finished last in 1976 to be relegated again.

Oakleigh remained in the second division for the rest of that division's existence, losing a number of grand finals along the way, until 1988 when they finally won the premiership. At the end of this season, the two division format was scrapped and all of the existing VFA clubs were merged into one competition for the following season. Oakleigh struggled to make an impact in the recombined competition and never managed to move far off the bottom of the ladder again.

At the end of 1994, when administration of the VFA was turned over to the Victorian State Football League, Oakleigh left the Association as part of the VSFL's efforts to reduce the size of the VFA and align it with the TAC Cup (Under 18s competition); Oakleigh's identity was carried on within the TAC Cup from 1995, when the new Oakleigh Chargers club was established to represent the south-east. The Chargers were one of two additional metropolitan clubs introduced to the TAC Cup in 1995 as part of a plan by the AFL to replace the traditional club zones with independent junior clubs. They are based at Warrawee Park in Oakleigh, representing the southeastern suburban area of Melbourne.

== Premierships ==
Melbourne District Association

- 1907, 1924, 1928

Victorian Football Association

- 1930, 1931, 1950, 1952, 1960, 1967 (2nd division), 1972, 1988 (2nd division)

== VFA Club Records ==
Highest Score	40.22 (262) v Sunshine, Round 6, 1982, Warrawee Park; 40.22 (262) v Sunshine, Round 6, 1984, Warrawee Park
Lowest Score	2.4 (16) v Dandenong, Round 9, 1991, Shepley Oval
Greatest Winning Margin	218 points v Yarraville, Round 14, 1983, Warrawee Park
Greatest Losing Margin	190 points v Sandringham, Round 14, 1992, Beach Road Oval
Lowest Winning Score	4.8 (32) v Sandringham 3.11 (29), Round 1, 1965, Warrawee Park
Highest Losing Score	23.9 (147) v Northcote 25.20 (170), 2nd Semi Final, 1982, Toorak Park

== Notable players ==
- Carlton – Jack Howell, Bryan Quirk, Ian Robertson and Simon Verbeek.
- Collingwood – Bill Jones, Heath Shephard and Alby Pannam.
- Essendon – Frank Maher.
- Fitzroy – Clen Denning (also Carlton)
- Footscray/Western Bulldogs Alan Thorpe
- Geelong – Eric Fleming
- Hawthorn — Frank Nolan
- Melbourne – Neil Crompton, Bob Johnson and Kevin Dyson
- Richmond – George Rudolph, Tony Jewell, Bill Barrot, George Smeaton, Graham Gaunt, Terry Smith and Clive Watson
- South Melbourne – Herbie Matthews.
- St Kilda – Wally Gunnyon and Eric Guy.
- Richard Di Natale - Former leader of the Australian Greens
- Keith Schleiger - (T.V personality The Block).
- Shane Rogers - National Recruiting Manager Carlton Football Club
- Cory Young - Liston Trophy
- Joe Garbiou - Liston Trophy
- Derek King – Liston Trophy and Field Medal.
- Brian Matthey - J Field Medal
- Rino Pretto – 874 career goals for Oakleigh, and one of only two men to have kicked 1000 VFA/VFL goals.
- 1945 Liston Trophy Eric Beard
