= 1958 VFL grand final =

Grand final of the 1958 Victorian Football League season

1958 VFL Grand Final

Melbourne	Collingwood
9.10 (64)	12.10 (82)
	1	2	3	4
MEL	5.1 (31)	7.4 (46)	7.6 (48)	9.10 (64)
COL	2.2 (14)	7.6 (48)	12.9 (81)	12.10 (82)
- Date: 20 September 1958
- Stadium: Melbourne Cricket Ground
- Attendance: 97,956
- Favourite: Melbourne

The 1958 VFL grand final was an Australian rules football game contested between the Melbourne Football Club and Collingwood Football Club, held at the Melbourne Cricket Ground on 20 September 1958. It was the 61st annual grand final of the Victorian Football League, staged to determine the premiers for the 1958 VFL season. The match, attended by 97,956 spectators, was won by Collingwood by 18 points, marking that club's 13th premiership victory.

One of the most famous grand finals of its era, Melbourne was favourite to win its fourth consecutive premiership to equal Collingwood's record set between 1927 and 1930. But, in wet conditions, Collingwood overcame Melbourne with hard, physical play and won by 18 points. The game is known among Collingwood supporters as the Miracle of '58.

== Teams ==
Melbourne	Collingwood

Collingwood
B:	Ron Reeves	Harry Sullivan	Ray Gabelich
HB:	Kevin Rose	Mike Delanty	Peter Lucas
C:	Brian Gray	John Henderson	Ken Turner
HF:	Brian Beers	Murray Weideman (c)	Bill Serong
F:	Mick Twomey	Ian Brewer	Ken Bennett
Foll:	Graeme Fellowes	Barry Harrison	Thorold Merrett
Res:	Ken Smale	Robert Greve	
Coach:	Phonse Kyne		

Melbourne
B:	John Beckwith (c)	Peter Marquis	Colin Wilson
HB:	Keith Carroll	Don Williams	Ian Thorogood
C:	Ian McLean	Laurie Mithen	Brian Dixon
HF:	Geoff Tunbridge	Trevor Johnson	Peter Brenchley
F:	Bob Johnson	Athol Webb	Frank 'Bluey' Adams
Foll:	Dick Fenton-Smith	Ron Barassi	Ian Ridley
Res:	Terry Gleeson	Neil Crompton	
Coach:	Norm Smith		

- Umpire: Allan Nash

== Statistics ==
=== Goalkickers ===
Collingwood:

- Beers 2
- Bennett 2
- Brewer 2
- Merrett 2
- Weideman 2
- Fellowes 1
- M.Twomey 1

Melbourne:

- Adams 2
- Barassi 2
- Brenchley 1
- Crompton 1
- B.Johnson 1
- McLean 1
- Ridley 1

=== Attendance ===
- MCG crowd – 97,956

== A "Great Comeback": implications and tactics ==
The Collingwood Magpies’ unexpected victory did not end the Melbourne Demons’ long domination of the VFL finals (Melbourne won the next two premierships in 1959 and 1960), but it did preserve the Magpies' record of four consecutive premierships. It has been remembered, and studied, as a notable case of an underdog team overcoming multiple disadvantages, while ignoring much of the tactical advice it was offered by sports journalists and others.

The Age described the Magpies’ victory as a "great comeback" which "must go down not only as one of the most important in the illustrious history of their great club, but also as one of the best on record." The Collingwood Football Club's website claims that, "while Melbourne was regarded as the near-perfect football team, Collingwood was regarded merely as a modest team of hard-workers".

A history of the Collingwood football club notes:

Regarded by most as an ordinary team fuelled more by old-fashioned 'G and D' [guts and determination] than by any innate football talent, embarrassingly thrashed by Melbourne in the 2nd semi final, missing both their skipper Frank Tuck and arguably their most talented player in Bill Twomey, the Magpies entered the 1958 grand final as the longest odds outsiders for years.

Melbourne and Collingwood had been the two most successful teams for most of that year, and when they clashed in a close contest in June, had set a crowd-size record for a home-and-away game, one that still stands, but by the end of the season Collingwood's form had slumped. A last-round home-and-away loss to North Melbourne very nearly cost them second position on the ladder. Melbourne also had an established history of dominance: their last ten encounters had resulted in nine Melbourne wins and a draw – including five wins in finals.

The odds against Collingwood lengthened after Melbourne won the Second Semi-Final by 45 points. The Magpies were subsequently much criticised, and ridiculed, for being uncompetitive. Collingwood's pacey first rover Thorold Merrett had relished the big ground, but the team as a whole had not. The Melbourne Herald’s chief football writer Alf Brown joked that by half-time Collingwood's only hope was “to phone up the old Merrett homestead and ask for seventeen more, just like little Thorold”.

In his review of the semi-final in The Age, Percy Beames said that Collingwood "thoroughly deserved to lose", and described how "a strong united Melbourne defence simply smothered a pathetically weak Collingwood attack", which "lacked pace on the big ground". It said the Magpies were short on "skill and ability", and that, while Collingwood's defenders were not disgraced, the "lumbering top-heavy Collingwood attack took a thrashing". Summing up the game's lessons, Beames said: "It was obvious that pace and cleverness, at the expense of marking power, must be introduced if Collingwood is going to play better. . . . Rover Ken Bennett is slow."

Collingwood was reputed to be a short team, and the witticism "Collingwood six-footer" had come into use in the 1950s for an allegedly tall player who was in fact less than 6 feet or 183 centimetres tall. Now, Beames implied, the selectors had gone too far in choosing taller but slower players.

In the following week, a re-organised Magpies team, playing to what seemed a different game-plan, swept aside North Melbourne. However, football writers still gave the Magpies almost no chance of winning the grand final against Melbourne.

The Magpies were handicapped by the losses through injuries of Frank Tuck, centre-half-back Ron Kingston, half-forward Brian Dorman, and centre-man Bill Twomey. Hence they were forced to take several unseasoned players, including four teenagers, into the grand final. The newcomers included the 19-year-old future Collingwood hall-of-fame member Kevin Rose, and the 20-year-old future interstate centre-man, John Henderson, playing their fifth and seventh games respectively. However, more effective on the day were the somewhat more experienced Brian Beers, Graeme Fellowes, Ken Bennett, and also Ron Reeves, whose pace and anticipation in the back pocket made it difficult for Melbourne to chase down Collingwood's lead in the last quarter.

One of Collingwood's main assets had been the half-back line of Lucas, Kingston and Tuck. (Note: For remarks on "the fabled half-back line of Lucas-Kingston-Tuck", see the Collingwood Football Club's 2019 obituary notes for Lucas.) Both Kingston and Tuck missed the grand final. Against that, Melbourne's coach Norm Smith was adept at devising ways to counter opposing champions. Collingwood's reliance on younger players, whose talents (and wet-weather skills) were less well known to him, may have made Smith's match-plans less precise than usual.

== Magpies' coaching strategy and defiance of media analysis ==
Much of the media criticism centred on the Magpies' supposed lack of leg speed, and particularly on their diminutive 18-year-old second rover Ken Bennett. In a preview article in The Age on the morning of the grand final, Percy Beames anticipated that "The slow roving of Ken Bennett could show up badly against the speed of [Melbourne's] Frank Adams".

Grand final day, with a maximum of 52.3 °F or 11.3 °C, was the coolest in league history until 2009, and the ground was wet and partly muddy. The Magpies' coach and selectors did not follow Beames' advice, sticking with Bennett, a skilled wet-weather player, throughout the finals; and he proved a match-winner. They also brought in, for the preliminary final and the grand final, a slow-moving but extremely tall ruckman, Graeme Fellowes, who helped neutralise the height advantage of Melbourne's very tall ruckman Bob Johnson, and put great pressure on Melbourne's unusual tactic of playing only two tall ruckmen plus two ruck rovers. (Note: See the list of players earlier in this article, with hyperlinks to players' details. Melbourne's ruck rovers were Barassi and Wilson.) This in turn put pressure on Melbourne's forward line. Their full-forward Athol Webb was fast but only 5 feet 11 inches (180 cm) tall. To compete for high marks near goal, Melbourne relied heavily on their hard-worked 6 feet 6 inches (198 cm) ruckman Bob Johnson, who rested from the ruck in the forward pocket. In the grand final, Johnson, while resting, was opposed by another famous ruckman, Collingwood's Ray Gabelich, and the former scored only one goal.

Despite their lack of experienced players, Collingwood made a bold decision to omit their champion back pocket player Lerrel Sharp, whose skills had been rewarded with interstate selection three times. Sharp seemed an ideal opponent for Melbourne's rovers Ian Ridley and Frank 'Bluey' Adams, both of whom were proven goal-kickers when they were “resting” in Melbourne's forward pocket. However, Sharp had been injured earlier that season and was replaced by Ron Reeves, a younger player whose form was so good that Sharp did not regain his place. In the grand ginal Melbourne tested Reeves. Aware that their full-forward Athol Webb might be out-marked, they sometimes directed their kicks instead to a marking contest between Reeves and the resting rover. They knew from the second semi-final that Reeves was, for his size, an excellent high-mark in dry weather. Yet the spinning torpedo punt kick, which was used in wet weather in those days, was both difficult to mark and unpredictable in flight. If the inexperienced defender lost his nerve and allowed many of those kicks to spill to ground, the Melbourne rovers were likely to score heavily.

There was debate about the tactics the Magpies used to curb the creativity and strength of Melbourne's great play-maker and ball-distributor Ron Barassi. Barassi was a ruck-rover, meaning that he was significantly taller and heavier than, and almost as agile as, the small rovers whose task was to collect the ball from the ground after the ruckmen knocked it down. Barassi, according to his entry in the Sport Australia Hall of Fame, was "revered as one of the most feared enforcers in the VFL"; and the Collingwood rovers Bennett and Thorold Merrett, both very lightly built, seemed vulnerable against him.

The Magpies' coach Phonse Kyne had Barassi closely followed (and confronted) by Barry Harrison, a player who was significantly taller than Barassi.. (Note: 6 feet 2 inches or 188 centimetres tall, versus Barassi's 5 feet 10 inches or 179 centimetres) Percy Beames, in the same preview of the grand final, remarked that this tactic had proved quite effective in the second semi-final but warned it would not succeed a second time: "Barassi can do a lot better than in the last game, more so, now that he has had the experience and knows what to expect from the ‘shadowing’ tactics of Harrison." In fact, the Magpies stuck with that tactic, which proved equally effective in the grand final.

Collingwood came closer to following Beames's advice in their choice of wingmen, who were important on the broad Melbourne Cricket Ground. They were usually small, agile players who excelled in foot-speed, not in high marking. But Melbourne had a champion wingman Brian Dixon who was quite tall. Hence Melbourne sometimes found an avenue to goal by kicking the ball high towards Dixon, who would out-mark a smaller opponent. Collingwood, however, also had a tall champion wingman in Ken Turner who, like Dixon, had represented Victoria several times at interstate level. In the second semi-final, Collingwood had sought a height advantage by playing the tall defender Mike Delanty (185 cm) on one wing but, in the grand final, they played Delanty at centre-half-back, improving team balance. Turner played on the same wing as Dixon, and prevailed, collecting 21 kicks and 10 marks, despite the wet ball.

Contrary to several warnings that Collingwood would be exposed for lack of pace on the big ground, by the third quarter of the grand final the commentator noted that their players, "were gaining the upper hand. They were faster, and playing in front of their men."

At half time, Collingwood were two points ahead, but after a third quarter in which their acting captain Murray Weideman temporarily got the better of Melbourne's champion centre half-back Don Williams, Collingwood led by 33 points. Two of the most dangerous forwards, Melbourne's wily Geoff Tunbridge and Collingwood's Bill Serong were being kept goal-less, having been matched with top defenders. At the three-quarter-time break Collingwood's Coach Phonse Kyne was heard shouting to his players that Melbourne would come back hard at them, and imploring, "Hang on... We gotta hang on...Hang on Boys!" Collingwood's best remaining half-back Peter Lucas and Melbourne's brilliant first-rover Ian Ridley were both injured, and replaced. In the final quarter, Melbourne attacked repeatedly, while keeping Collingwood goal-less; but theycould make up only two and a half goals of the deficit, losing by an even three goals.

== Criticism of Magpies' tactics ==
Football writers Percy Beames in The Age and Alf Brown in The Herald agreed that the Magpies’ "vigor", although expected, disconcerted some of the Melbourne players, either by intimidating them or by sucking them into retaliating rather than concentrating on football. Both Harrison and Barassi were reported by the umpire on one count each of rough conduct, though neither was subsequently penalised by the VFL tribunal.

Many Melbourne supporters were galled by the unexpected defeat, and blamed either the umpire or unfair tactics by the Magpies. However, the Melbourne coach, Norm Smith, though privately distraught, was magnanimous in defeat. He entered the Collingwood rooms after the match and congratulated them, his speech beginning: "I hate you bastards! But, by God, I admire you". According to The Age, Smith told the Magpies: "We have no regrets. On the day you were by far the better side", and he also told Melbourne supporters not to blame the umpire, who "had nothing to do with it".

== Media analysis, post-match ==
 Percy Beames, in a post-match article headlined "Magpies End Long Melbourne Reign", wrote that the Magpies prevailed in "a tough, torrid, and typical grand final clash" which they won "by playing football almost perfectly suited to the conditions".

The deciding factor . . . was something that Melbourne simply could not match on the day—the fierce desire of Collingwood's players to win Saturday's honor for their club. . . Regardless of danger, they hurled themselves recklessly into packs; fiercely blocked or met any Melbourne player attempting to break away, shepherded, backed up, lifted each other with encouragement . . . The lesson from the match is that it is what a team gives all over the field that counts—not just brilliance in a few positions. Collingwood had evenness, and received near maximum value from almost all players.

Beames praised Ken Bennett for restoring Collingwood's self-belief, after Melbourne had raced to a three-goal lead by quarter time. "Two clever goals in as many minutes by Bennett, who battled his way courageously through the Melbourne defence, were the spark that set the Magpies aflame."

Beames also suggested that Collingwood's heavy defeat in the second semi-final had been a blessing in disguise:

Victory would have lifted them straight into the grand final, and would have deluded selectors into believing in, and sticking to, that badly arranged semi-final side . . . Match-winning moves that followed that semi-final defeat would not have been made. . . . Out of that semi-final loss Collingwood gained the strength, both in team composition and in tactical application, to rise from a very ordinary side to a premiership combination.

The Age listed the best players as: for COLLINGWOOD — Merrett, Fellowes, K. Turner, Delanty, Reeves, Bennett, and for MELBOURNE — Mithen, Williams, Thorogood, R. Johnson, Marquis, Brenchley.

A goal-kicking analysis shows that each team scored six goals through its rucks and rovers, but only one of Melbourne's four permanent forwards, Peter Brenchley, scored a goal. By contrast, three out of Collingwood's four permanent forwards scored two goals each. On the day, Collingwood's "lumbering, top-heavy" forward line had proved more potent than Melbourne's.

Film of highlights of the 1958 grand final survives in two ten-minute compilations, one by Channel 7 in black and white, being parts of the final quarter with commentary by Tony Charlton, and another in color.

== See also ==
- 1958 VFL season
