= 1956 VFL grand final =

Grand final of the 1956 Victorian Football League season

1956 VFL Grand Final

Melbourne	Collingwood
17.19 (121)	6.12 (48)
	1	2	3	4
MEL	2.4 (16)	6.11 (47)	10.16 (76)	17.19 (121)
COL	3.3 (21)	4.3 (27)	5.6 (36)	6.12 (48)
- Date: 15 September 1956
- Stadium: Melbourne Cricket Ground
- Attendance: 115,902

The 1956 VFL Grand Final was an Australian rules football game contested between the Melbourne Football Club and Collingwood Football Club, held at the Melbourne Cricket Ground on 15 September 1956. It was the 59th annual Grand Final of the Victorian Football League, staged to determine the premiers for the 1956 VFL season. The match was won by Melbourne by 73 points, marking that club's eighth premiership victory.

It was the second successive year in which the two teams met in a premiership decider, with Melbourne having won the 1955 VFL Grand Final.

The Grand Final was attended by 115,902 spectators, easily setting a new record as the largest crowd to have witnessed a premiership decider in VFL Grand Final history, breaking the record of 96,486 spectators who witnessed the 1938 VFL Grand Final. The capacity of the ground had recently been expanded with a new grandstand for the upcoming 1956 Summer Olympics, but the ground was still not large enough to comfortably or safely accommodate such a large crowd; stairwells and aisles were full of people, meaning that many people were unable to leave their positions to use restrooms during the game; and many people had restricted views of the game due to the crowding, resulting in some spectators climbing onto the roofs or back walls of the grandstand and other structures for a better view. The gates were shut for safety reasons when the venue reached capacity, resulting in riots outside the ground in which an estimated 2,500 further spectators broke into the ground. More than 20,000 spectators were turned away at the gate. Pre-sale ticketing for finals was introduced from the following season to prevent a repeat of these events, and the crowd record stood until the 1968 VFL Grand Final – after the opening of the Western Stand.

A scene from the game is captured in Jamie Cooper's painting The Game That Made Australia, commissioned by the AFL in 2008 to celebrate the 150th anniversary of the sport: Collingwood's Neil Mann and Melbourne's Ian Ridley fighting amongst the spectators who were sitting on the arena (but behind the boundary line).

== Teams ==
Melbourne	Collingwood

Melbourne
B:	John Beckwith	Peter Marquis	Trevor Johnson
HB:	Don Williams	Noel McMahen (c)	Keith Carroll
C:	Frank 'Bluey' Adams	Ken Melville	Brian Dixon
HF:	Jim Sandral	Clyde Laidlaw	Laurie Mithen
F:	Bob Johnson	Athol Webb	Ian Ridley
Foll:	Denis Cordner	Ron Barassi	Stuart Spencer
Res:	Terry Gleeson	Ralph Lane	
Coach:	Norm Smith		

Collingwood
B:	Lerrel Sharp	Harry Sullivan	Neville Waller
HB:	Peter Lucas	Frank Tuck	Ron Kingston
C:	Ken Hedt	Bill Twomey, Jr.	Thorold Merrett
HF:	Ken Turner	Murray Weideman	Bill Serong
F:	Neil Mann (c)	Ken Smale	Bob Greve
Foll:	Ray Gabelich	Laurie Rymer	Bill Jones
Res:	Jack Hamilton	Bob Kupsch	
Coach:	Phonse Kyne		

- Umpire: Allan Nash

== Statistics ==
=== Goalkickers ===
Melbourne:

- S. Spencer 5
- A. Webb 5
- R. Barassi 3
- B. Johnson 3
- I. Ridley 1

Collingwood:

- B. Greve 1
- W. Jones 1
- B. Serong 1
- K. Smale 1
- K. Turner 1
- B. Twomey 1

== Bibliography ==
- The Official statistical history of the AFL 2004
- Ross, J. (ed), 100 Years of Australian Football 1897–1996: The Complete Story of the AFL, All the Big Stories, All the Great Pictures, All the Champions, Every AFL Season Reported, Viking, (Ringwood), 1996. ISBN 0-670-86814-0
