= 1955 VFL grand final =

Grand final of the 1955 Victorian Football League season

1955 VFL Grand Final

Melbourne	Collingwood
8.16 (64)	5.6 (36)
	1	2	3	4
MEL	2.3 (15)	3.10 (28)	4.13 (37)	8.16 (64)
COL	2.2 (14)	2.5 (17)	4.6 (30)	5.6 (36)
- Date: 17 September 1955
- Stadium: Melbourne Cricket Ground
- Attendance: 88,053
- Umpires: Harry Beitzel

Accolades
- Jock McHale Medallist: Norm Smith

The 1955 VFL Grand Final was an Australian rules football game contested between the Melbourne Football Club and Collingwood Football Club, held at the Melbourne Cricket Ground on 17 September 1955. It was the 58th annual Grand Final of the Victorian Football League, staged to determine the premiers for the 1955 VFL season. The match, attended by 88,053 spectators, was won by Melbourne by 28 points, marking that club's seventh premiership victory.

A scene from the game is captured in Jamie Cooper's painting The Game That Made Australia, commissioned by the AFL in 2008 to celebrate the 150th anniversary of the sport.

== Background ==
Melbourne's qualification for its second consecutive VFL Grand final appearance capped one of the most remarkable turnarounds in VFL/AFL history; only two seasons prior, the club had finished second-last on the ladder. After their heavy defeat in the previous year's decider against Footscray, the Demons started the 1955 VFL season with strong wins against St Kilda and Geelong, after which they went to the top of the ladder and stayed there for the rest of the season, earning their third minor premiership with 15 wins and three losses. In very wet and muddy conditions, Melbourne advanced straight to the Grand final in a torrid 11-point Second Semi-final victory against Collingwood.

After being on top of the ladder going into Round 15 of the 1954 season, Collingwood suffered a dramatic form slump, losing all its remaining home-and-away games to end in seventh position. Despite some early season setbacks in 1955, the Magpies were in the top four by Round 6 and stayed there for the remainder of the season, vying with Geelong for second and third position. Both teams finished the home-and-away season with 14 wins and four losses, but Collingwood's superior percentage helped it claim second place. After their loss to Melbourne in the above-mentioned Semi-final, the Magpies rallied to beat Geelong in an entertaining Preliminary final by 12 points and gain a second crack at Melbourne.

The two teams met only once in the home-and-away season, in Round 11 at Victoria Park, when Collingwood prevailed by 3 points.

== Teams ==
Melbourne	Collingwood

Melbourne
B:	30 John Beckwith	3 Peter Marquis	14 Trevor Johnson
HB:	25 Don Williams	17 Geoff McGivern	35 Noel McMahen (c)
C:	5 Ian McLean	38 Ken Melville	7 Geoff Case
HF:	11 Laurie Mithen	16 Clyde Laidlaw	2 Bob McKenzie
F:	18 Bob Johnson	8 Noel Clarke	24 Ian Ridley
Foll:	1 Denis Cordner	31 Ron Barassi	12 Stuart Spencer
Res:	28 Terry Gleeson	6 Frank Adams	
Coach:	Norm Smith		

Collingwood
B:	29 Lerrel Sharp	8 Jack Hamilton	31 Neville Waller
HB:	3 Peter Lucas	24 Frank Tuck	9 Ron Kingston
C:	12 Des Healey	18 Jack Parker	17 Thorold Merrett
HF:	23 Bill Jones	5 Ken Smale	27 Murray Weideman
F:	25 Mick Twomey	4 Keith Batchelor	22 Bob Rose
Foll:	2 Neil Mann (c)	14 Arthur Gooch	20 Ron Richards
Res:	Jack Hickey	Bob Kupsch	
Coach:	Phonse Kyne		

Umpires

The umpiring panel for the match, comprising one field umpire, two boundary umpires and two goal umpires is given below.

1955 VFL Grand Final umpires
Position			Emergency
Field:	Harry Beitzel (1)		
Boundary:	John Geggie (1)	William Treloar (2)	
Goal:	Henry Clayton (1)	Darrell Cranch (1)	

Numbers in brackets represent the number of grand finals umpired, including 1955.

== Match summary ==
The MCG surface was still drying out on Grand final day, but the whole game was played in glorious sunshine. Melbourne's intent to physically dominate was made clear early in the game when captain Noel McMahen fiercely bumped Collingwood champion Bob Rose with a legitimate hip-and-shoulder charge a split second after Rose had kicked the ball into attack. From the resulting downfield free kick, Murray Weideman scored the first goal of the game. After a slow start, Melbourne's physical vigour eventually wore down a determined Collingwood team.

=== The Healey–Adams incident ===
In the annals of VFL/AFL history, the 1955 Grand Final is mostly remembered for one of the most sickening on-field incidents during a match. In the final stages of the game, the Demons had pulled away to a 13-point lead when Collingwood wingman Des Healey won the ball and dashed down the wing. Norm Smith had just replaced Geoff Case, who was suffering from cramps, with 20th man Frank "Bluey" Adams, who sprinted onto the ground and into the path of Healey. Adams had barely been on the ground ten seconds.

Concerned Collingwood officials were further angered when a miscommunication resulted in a two-hour wait for an ambulance. Healey was eventually transported to St Vincent's Hospital with concussion, shock, a nose badly broken in five places and a fractured skull – this last injury was not identified until years later when Healey was forced to have X-rays following a car accident.

As Collingwood supporters jeered and threw bottles, rubbish and fruit at Adams as he was carried from the field, Smith feared a riot. He later told the now defunct newspaper Truth:

If Bluey had not been unconscious, anything could have happened. I doubt if there has ever been an uglier crowd. Hundreds decided Bluey had deliberately charged Des Healey to put him out of the game ... How ridiculous. Would a man race at another head-on, knock himself out, to put a man out of a game already won? ... Bluey is not that sort of footballer.

Adams remained unconscious for 40 minutes, during which time Melbourne had won the game. When he eventually came to, he gibbered, "Don't take me off, Norm, my leg's all right!" before being taken by ambulance to the Alfred Hospital, where he was diagnosed with concussion.

== Scorecard ==
1955 VFL Grand final
Saturday, 18 September (2:30 pm)	Melbourne	def.	Collingwood	Melbourne Cricket Ground (crowd: 88,053)	Report
2.3 (15); 3.10 (28); 4.13 (37); 8.16 (64)	Q1; Q2; Q3; Final	2.2 (14); 2.5 (17); 4.6 (30); 5.6 (36)	Umpires: Harry Beitzel
Clarke, Ridley 3 McKenzie, Laidlaw 1	Goals	2 Weideman; 1 Bob Rose, Smale, Jones
Denis Cordner, Barassi, Melville, McLean, McMahen, Marquis	Best	Hamilton, Lucas, Mann, Bob Rose, Sharp, Tuck
Adams (concussion)	Injuries	Tuck (ankle), Healey (concussion)
Nil	Reports	Nil

== Aftermath and evaluation ==
Essendon legend Dick Reynolds acknowledged Melbourne as deserving premiers but also noted the poor attacking play exhibited by both teams in the game, which he believed to stem from a growing emphasis on rushing the ball into attack:

[...] Melbourne proved beyond doubt that it is the best-balanced team in the League, and every fair-minded football fan will applaud the Demons' seventh premiership. This young side... has pace, weight, height, reach, and courage. It has passed with honors every test to which a League side is subjected. [...] Certainly, the Demons, on their record this year, deserve the pennant. Had they missed it the cause would have been their inaccuracy forward. What is the reason for this unreliability in attack which afflicted Melbourne, Collingwood, and six other league clubs this season? [...] Neither Melbourne nor Collingwood delivered the ball to its full forward properly on Saturday. He was either ignored by players racing goalwards, or the ball was lofted to him with high punts. With the game played at its present feverish tempo, unless half-forwards and rovers deliver the ball with rocketing stab passes the centre forward is not in the race. [...] This obsession with pace and play-on means that players are not steadying for their kicks, and that is why passes go astray. And plenty went astray in the grand final. We saw really good football only in flashes.

Melbourne's victory marked the first of six VFL premierships for Norm Smith as coach; he had been full-forward in Melbourne's previous premiership triumph in 1948. The Demons would become the dominant team of the decade, participating in six further VFL Grand finals and winning five during that period.

The decade also marked a golden era in the club's rivalry with Collingwood; 1955 would be the first of five times the two teams faced each other in VFL Grand finals, with Melbourne winning four of those encounters. Even as of 2023, eight of the top ten match attendance figures between Melbourne and Collingwood were from between 1955 and 1964, including the record VFL/AFL crowd figure for a home-and-away fixture – 99,256 in 1958.

== Bibliography ==
- Atkinson, Graeme; Atkinson, Brant (2009). The Complete Book of AFL Finals (5th ed.). Scoresby, Victoria: The Five Mile Press. ISBN 978-1-74211-275-6.
- Lovett, Michael, ed. (2013). AFL Record Season Guide 2013. AFL Media. ISSN 1839-8383.
- Ross, John, ed. (1996). 100 Years of Australian Football 1897–1996: The Complete Story of the AFL, All the Big Stories, All the Great Pictures, All the Champions, Every AFL Season Reported. Ringwood, Victoria: Viking. ISBN 0-670-86814-0.
