= Stuart Spencer (footballer) =

Australian rules footballer and coach (1932–2011)

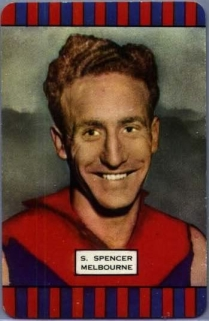

Personal information
- Born: 3 February 1932; Digby, Victoria
- Died: 27 September 2011 (aged 79); Melbourne, Victoria
- Original team: Portland
- Height: 178 cm (5 ft 10 in)
- Weight: 76 kg (168 lb)
- Position: Rover

Playing career^{1}
Years	Club	Games (Goals)
1950–1956	Melbourne	122 (146)
- ^{1} Playing statistics correct to the end of 1956.

Career highlights
- 2× VFL premiership: 1955, 1956; 2× Keith 'Bluey' Truscott Medal: 1955, 1956; Melbourne leading goal kicker: 1955; Melbourne Team of the Century; Australian Football Hall of Fame; Melbourne Hall of Fame; 2× All-Australian: 1956, 1958; 2× William Leitch Medal: 1960, 1967 (tied)

Stuart Spencer (3 February 1932 – 27 September 2011) was an Australian rules footballer in the Victorian Football League (VFL) and Tasmanian Football League (TFL) in the 1950s and 1960s.

== VFL ==
Born in the small country town of Digby, Victoria, Spencer started his football career with the Portland Football Netball Cricket Club, playing 45 games. He then came to the attention of Geelong in the VFL, where he started pre-season trialling in 1949. The Geelong coach, Reg Hickey, moved Spencer on after only two weeks, and he settled at Melbourne.

Spencer made his League debut in 1950, but his career really took off with the arrival of Norm Smith as coach of Melbourne for the 1952 season. Spencer is quoted as saying that Smith told him: "'Stuey, there is time for you to go back to back pocket when you're 35', so he launched me into my role as rover."

Spencer became an integral part of what was to become the most highly successful part of the history of the Melbourne club. His contemporaries included prominent players of that era – Ron Barassi, Brian Dixon, (Frank) 'Bluey' Truscott, Johnny Beckwith.

He was recognised as an outstanding player, winning back-to-back best and fairest awards for Melbourne in the premiership years of 1955 and 1956, as well as being the club leading goalkicker in 1955. In the 1956 Grand Final he kicked five goals in a best on ground performance.

== TFL ==
It was thus highly surprising that, at the peak of his VFL career, Spencer moved to Tasmania and became captain-coach of Clarence in the Tasmanian Football League in 1957. Although several sources say that he moved due to business reasons, Spencer has stated that the primary reasons for his move was that his wife Fay was eight months pregnant with their first child and wanted to move to her native Tasmania for family support.

Spencer brought a tough and disciplined style of football to Tasmania. He won two TFL best and fairest awards (William Leitch Medal) and also twice won the Lefroy medal for best and fairest Tasmanian player in interstate matches. He is credited with bringing Clarence up to a standard where they would eventually go on to be one of the most successful of Tasmanian clubs.

His Tasmanian playing career reached its peak when he captained the Tasmanian state side to its first ever victory over arch-rival Victoria, in 1960 at Launceston. He was adjudged best-on-ground and kicked the game-sealing score.

== Other ==
Spencer's coaching did not stop with Clarence, he also coached St. Virgil's College to three successive state independent schools' premierships.

Spencer was president of the Clarence Football Club for two terms and was a member of the board of management in 1979.

Spencer was president of the Melbourne Football Club from 1986 to 1991, overseeing their first Grand Final appearance for 24 years in 1988.

At age 74 Spencer still worked as the managing director of the Greens Group, a Hobart removals and storage company.

Spencer died in Melbourne aged 79.

The Stuart Spencer Stand at Bellerive Oval was named after him.
