= 1959 VFL grand final =

Grand final of the 1959 Victorian Football League season

1959 VFL Grand Final

Melbourne	Essendon
17.13 (115)	11.12 (78)
	1	2	3	4
MEL	1.4 (10)	8.5 (53)	11.10 (76)	17.13 (115)
ESS	3.5 (23)	7.8 (50)	10.10 (70)	11.12 (78)
- Date: 26 September 1959
- Stadium: Melbourne Cricket Ground
- Attendance: 103,506

The 1959 VFL grand final was an Australian rules football game contested between the Melbourne Football Club and Essendon Football Club, held at the Melbourne Cricket Ground on 20 September 1959. It was the 62nd annual grand final of the Victorian Football League, staged to determine the premiers for the 1959 VFL season. The match, attended by 103,506 spectators, was won by Melbourne by 37 points, marking that club's tenth premiership victory.

This was Melbourne's sixth of seven successive grand final appearance. It was the second time in three years in which the two teams met in the grand final, with Melbourne also having won the previous one in 1957. The 1959 grand final was the first to conclude with the presentation of a VFL premiership cup, which was inaugurated this year.

== Teams ==
Melbourne	Essendon

Melbourne
B:	John Beckwith (c)	Tassie Johnson	John Lord
HB:	Geoff Case	Dennis Jones	Ian Thorogood
C:	Ian McLean	Laurie Mithen	Brian Dixon
HF:	Geoff Tunbridge	Clyde Laidlaw	Hassa Mann
F:	Ron Barassi	Alan Rowarth	Ian Ridley
Foll:	Bob Johnson	Dick Fenton-Smith	Frank 'Bluey' Adams
Res:	Don Williams	Peter Brenchley	
Coach:	Norm Smith		

Essendon
B:	Bob Shearman	John Towner	Brian Sampson
HB:	Alec Epis	Ian Shelton	Col Hebbard
C:	Alby Murdoch	Reg Burgess	Barry Capuano
HF:	Ken Peucker	Ken Fraser	Greg Sewell
F:	David Shaw	Ron Evans	John Birt
Foll:	Geoff Leek	Hugh Mitchell	Jack Clarke (c)
Res:	Barry Mackie	Graham Leydin	
Coach:	Dick Reynolds		

- Umpire: Bill Barbour

== Statistics ==
=== Goalkickers ===
Melbourne:

- R Barassi 4
- A Rowarth 4
- F Adams 3
- B Johnson 3
- H Mann 1
- I Ridley 1
- G Tunbridge 1

Essendon:

- G Sewell 4
- J Clarke 2
- R Evans 2
- D Shaw 2
- K Fraser 1

== See also ==
- 1959 VFL season
