= Bluey Adams =

Australian rules footballer (1935–2019)

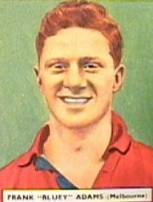

Personal information
- Born: 12 June 1935
- Died: 11 August 2019 (aged 84)
- Debut: 1953, Melbourne vs. North Melbourne, at Melbourne Cricket Ground
- Height: 168 cm (5 ft 6 in)
- Weight: 76 kg (168 lb)

Playing career^{1}
Years	Club	Games (Goals)
1953–1964	Melbourne	164 (180)
- ^{1} Playing statistics correct to the end of 1964.

Career highlights
- 6× VFL premierships: 1955, 1956, 1957, 1959, 1960, 1964; Melbourne Team of the Century–interchange; Melbourne Hall of Fame

Frank Adams (12 June 1935 – 11 August 2019), known as Bluey Adams, was an Australian rules football player, who played in the Victorian Football League (VFL) for the Melbourne Football Club.

== Football ==
His prime positions were in the forward pocket, where he was a regular goal-kicker, and as a rover and a wing-man, where he was able to use his pace to advantage in the open spaces of the MCG. He was one of the few Melbourne players to be part of all six premierships the club gained during its ten 'golden years' from 1955 to 1964.

== Statistics ==
Legend
G	Goals	K	Kicks	D	Disposals	T	Tackles
B	Behinds	H	Handballs	M	Marks
#	Played in that season's premiership team

Season	Team	No.	Games	Totals							Averages (per game)							Votes
Season	Team	No.	Games	G	B	K	H	D	M	T	G	B	K	H	D	M	T	Votes
1953	Melbourne	41	4	5	—N/a	—N/a	—N/a	—N/a	—N/a	—N/a	1.3	—N/a	—N/a	—N/a	—N/a	—N/a	—N/a	0
1954	Melbourne	6	18	20	—N/a	—N/a	—N/a	—N/a	—N/a	—N/a	1.1	—N/a	—N/a	—N/a	—N/a	—N/a	—N/a	1
1955^{#}	Melbourne	6	16	9	—N/a	—N/a	—N/a	—N/a	—N/a	—N/a	0.6	—N/a	—N/a	—N/a	—N/a	—N/a	—N/a	1
1956^{#}	Melbourne	6	7	3	—N/a	—N/a	—N/a	—N/a	—N/a	—N/a	0.4	—N/a	—N/a	—N/a	—N/a	—N/a	—N/a	0
1957^{#}	Melbourne	6	14	17	—N/a	—N/a	—N/a	—N/a	—N/a	—N/a	1.2	—N/a	—N/a	—N/a	—N/a	—N/a	—N/a	6
1958	Melbourne	6,17	13	13	—N/a	—N/a	—N/a	—N/a	—N/a	—N/a	1.0	—N/a	—N/a	—N/a	—N/a	—N/a	—N/a	0
1959^{#}	Melbourne	6	17	25	—N/a	—N/a	—N/a	—N/a	—N/a	—N/a	1.5	—N/a	—N/a	—N/a	—N/a	—N/a	—N/a	0
1960^{#}	Melbourne	6	13	16	—N/a	—N/a	—N/a	—N/a	—N/a	—N/a	1.2	—N/a	—N/a	—N/a	—N/a	—N/a	—N/a	3
1961	Melbourne	6	13	23	—N/a	—N/a	—N/a	—N/a	—N/a	—N/a	1.8	—N/a	—N/a	—N/a	—N/a	—N/a	—N/a	4
1962	Melbourne	6	16	30	—N/a	—N/a	—N/a	—N/a	—N/a	—N/a	1.9	—N/a	—N/a	—N/a	—N/a	—N/a	—N/a	3
1963	Melbourne	6	18	18	—N/a	—N/a	—N/a	—N/a	—N/a	—N/a	1.0	—N/a	—N/a	—N/a	—N/a	—N/a	—N/a	2
1964^{#}	Melbourne	6	15	1	—N/a	—N/a	—N/a	—N/a	—N/a	—N/a	0.1	—N/a	—N/a	—N/a	—N/a	—N/a	—N/a	3
Career			164	180	—N/a	—N/a	—N/a	—N/a	—N/a	—N/a	1.1	—N/a	—N/a	—N/a	—N/a	—N/a	—N/a	23

== Athletics ==
Adams was a national champion professional sprinter. Adams won the 1957, 75 yards/130 yards Gift double at Cobram then a week later won the Lilydale Gift (130 yds) before running second in the 1957 Bendigo Thousand (130 yds).

After running second in the Maryborough Gift, Adams won the 1958 Ararat Gift off a handicap of 3 yards in 12.3 seconds. He rounded off the year winning the South Melbourne and 1958 Canberra Gifts.

In November 1958, Adams ran a superb time of 43.8 seconds for 400 yards on a wet grass track at South Melbourne,

Adams won the 1959 Australian sprint title before losing the title in 1960 to Terry Clarke, before retiring from athletics at the age of 25.

== Death ==
Adams died age 84 on 11 August 2019 from cancer.
