= 1957 VFL grand final =

Grand final of the 1957 Victorian Football League season

1957 VFL Grand Final

Melbourne	Essendon
17.14 (116)	7.13 (55)
	1	2	3	4
MEL	6.2 (38)	9.9 (63)	12.11 (83)	17.14 (116)
ESS	2.3 (15)	4.4 (28)	7.8 (50)	7.13 (55)
- Date: 21 September 1957
- Stadium: Melbourne Cricket Ground
- Attendance: 100,324

The 1957 VFL Grand Final was an Australian rules football game contested between the Melbourne Football Club and Essendon Football Club, held at the Melbourne Cricket Ground on 21 September 1957. It was the 60th annual Grand Final of the Victorian Football League, staged to determine the premiers for the 1957 VFL season. The match, attended by 100,324 spectators, was won by Melbourne by 61 points, marking that club's ninth premiership victory.

This was Melbourne's fourth successive Grand Final appearance and third successive premiership. Ron Barassi starred for the Demons with five goals, four of them in the first half to put the game out of Essendon's reach. Melbourne's coach Norm Smith had previously participated in successive premierships as a player, from 1939 to 1941.

== Teams ==
Melbourne	Essendon

Melbourne
B:	John Beckwith (c)	Peter Marquis	Dick Fenton-Smith
HB:	Don Williams	John Lord	Keith Carroll
C:	Ian McLean	Laurie Mithen	Brian Dixon
HF:	Geoff Tunbridge	Trevor Johnson	Geoff Case
F:	Ron Barassi	Athol Webb	Ian Ridley
Foll:	Bob Johnson	Colin Wilson	Frank Adams
Res:	Ian Thorogood	Peter Brenchley	
Coach:	Norm Smith		

Essendon
B:	Bob Suter	Jack Knowles	Mal Pascoe
HB:	Bob Shearman	Jeff Gamble	John Towner
C:	Reg Burgess	Jack Clarke	Greg Sewell
HF:	Col Hebbard	Robert Fox	Stan Booth
F:	Geoff Leek	Fred Gallagher	John Birt
Foll:	John Gill	Hugh Mitchell	Bill Hutchison (c)
Res:	Leo Maloney	Jim Heenan	
Coach:	Dick Reynolds		

- Umpire – Allan Nash

== Statistics ==
=== Goalkickers ===
Melbourne:

- Barassi 5
- Ridley 4
- Webb 3
- B.Johnson 2
- Tunbridge 2
- Case 1

Essendon:

- Gallagher 3
- Birt 1
- Clarke 1
- Gill 1
- Hebbard 1

=== Attendance ===
- MCG crowd – 100,324

== See also ==
- 1957 VFL season
- 1948 VFL Grand Final
- 2000 AFL Grand Final
