= Murray Weideman =

Australian rules footballer and coach (1936–2021)

Personal information
- Born: 16 February 1936; Victoria, Australia
- Died: 17 February 2021 (aged 85)
- Original team: Preston Districts
- Height: 187 cm (6 ft 2 in)
- Weight: 96 kg (212 lb)

Playing career^{1}
Years	Club	Games (Goals)
1953–1963	Collingwood	180 (262)

Representative team honours
Years	Team	Games (Goals)
1956–1960	Victoria	

Coaching career^{3}
Years	Club	Games (W–L–D)
1975–1976	Collingwood	45 (19–26–0)
- ^{1} Playing statistics correct to the end of 1963.^{3} Coaching statistics correct as of 1976.

Career highlights
- Collingwood premiership player 1953; Collingwood premiership captain 1958; Collingwood Team of the Century; Collingwood Life Member; Copeland Trophy 1957, 1961, 1962; Collingwood vice-captain 1958–1959; Collingwood leading goalkicker 1959, 1960, 1962; Collingwood captain 1960–1963; O&MFL Premiership Coach Albury FC 1966; Australian Football Hall of Fame, inducted 2007

Murray Weideman (16 February 1936 – 17 February 2021) was an Australian rules footballer in the Victorian Football League (VFL). He died one day after his 85th birthday.

== Personal life ==
The son of George Oliver and Hazel Howard Weideman (née Start), and the younger brother of pharmacist/parliamentarian George "Graeme" Weideman, he was born on 16 February 1936. He died on 18 February 2021. Weideman's son Mark Weideman also played for West Adelaide (SANFL) and Collingwood; and his grandson, Sam Weideman, previously played for Melbourne and Essendon.

== Playing career ==
Weideman is probably best remembered today as Collingwood's 'enforcer' of the late 1950s and early 1960s, loved by the club's supporters, and loathed by those of the opposition.

He made his senior VFL debut in 1953, and was on the bench for that year's Grand Final, in which Collingwood defeated Geelong.

When regular Collingwood skipper Frank Tuck was injured and unavailable for the 1958 VFL Grand Final against Melbourne, Weideman became Collingwood's acting skipper, and kicked two goals. (Collingwood won by three goals.) The wet weather that day made the ball slippery and produced congested packs of players, which suited Weideman with his physical strength more than it did players who relied on speed and nimbleness. Despite this, Weideman's opponent, the Melbourne centre-halfback Don Williams, was (as often) among Melbourne's best players —"though outmatched by Weideman in the last [i.e. the third] quarter", according to Tony Charlton's commentary in the Channel 7 highlights of the final quarter.

=== Awards ===
Weideman was much more than just the football equivalent of a hit man. He won the Copeland Trophy for Collingwood's best and fairest player in 1957, 1961 and 1962, and was usually among the Magpies' best players in important games. He moved to the Albury Football Club in 1964 as captain-coach and was selected as centre half forward in Collingwood's official 'Team of the Twentieth Century'.

== Coaching career ==
Weideman accepted the captain-coach position of Albury in the Ovens & Murray Football League in 1964 and lead them to the 1966 premiership, where he coached until 1967. Murray Wiedeman then coached West Adelaide in the South Australian National Football League (SANFL) from 1968 to 1971, taking West Adelaide to the Preliminary Final in 1969.

Weideman made a brief return to his old club Collingwood in 1975 as coach. After a solid debut season which spawned an 11–9 record and fifth place on the ladder, things quickly went bad in 1976 as the club plummeted to its first wooden spoon. Weideman was quickly replaced by former multiple time Richmond premiership coach Tom Hafey for the 1977 VFL season.

== Wrestling ==
Weideman's reputation as a football 'hard man' was utilised by the Australian professional wrestling promotion of the day, International Wrestling. While recovering from a shoulder injury sustained during 1962 season, Weideman was induced to enter the wrestling ring in a bid to draw publicity to the ailing promotion. He was paired with Italian-American veteran Salvatore Savoldi as his tag team partner, and generally put over by his opponents. While briefly serving its purpose in attracting publicity, it ultimately resulted in little benefit to either Weideman or International Wrestling.
