= Don Williams (footballer, born 1935) =

Australian rules footballer

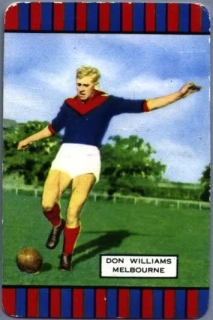

Personal information
- Full name: Donald Edward Williams
- Born: 3 November 1935
- Died: 19 October 1995 (aged 59)
- Original team: Elsternwick Amateurs
- Height: 182 cm (6 ft 0 in)
- Weight: 80 kg (176 lb)

Playing career^{1}
Years	Club	Games (Goals)
1953–59, 1964–68	Melbourne	205 (5)
1960–62	West Perth	45 (21)
Total		250 (26)
- ^{1} Playing statistics correct to the end of 1968.

Career highlights
- 5× VFL Premierships: 1955, 1956, 1957, 1959, 1964; Melbourne Team of the Century–half-back; Melbourne Hall of Fame

Donald Edward Williams (3 November 1935 – 19 October 1995) was an Australian rules footballer who played for Melbourne during the 1950s and 1960s.

Williams was a half-back flanker and five time premiership player with Melbourne, including their successive triumphs in 1955, 1956 and 1957. After being dropped to the bench in the 1959 grand final he decided to leave the club and spent the 1960 season with West Perth, who won the WAFL Grand Final in that year. He represented Western Australia in the Brisbane Carnival where Western Australia defeated Victoria for the first time.

He returned to the Melbourne Football Club in 1964 and played in that year's four-point Grand Final win over Collingwood.

In 2000, he was named on the half-back flank in Melbourne's official Team of the Century.

== Statistics ==
Legend
G	Goals	K	Kicks	D	Disposals	T	Tackles
B	Behinds	H	Handballs	M	Marks

Season	Team	No.	Games	Totals							Averages (per game)							Votes
Season	Team	No.	Games	G	B	K	H	D	M	T	G	B	K	H	D	M	T	Votes
1953	Melbourne	25	16	0	—N/a	—N/a	—N/a	—N/a	—N/a	—N/a	0.0	—N/a	—N/a	—N/a	—N/a	—N/a	—N/a	8
1954	Melbourne	25	21	0	—N/a	—N/a	—N/a	—N/a	—N/a	—N/a	0.0	—N/a	—N/a	—N/a	—N/a	—N/a	—N/a	0
1955	Melbourne	25	20	0	—N/a	—N/a	—N/a	—N/a	—N/a	—N/a	0.0	—N/a	—N/a	—N/a	—N/a	—N/a	—N/a	3
1956	Melbourne	25	18	0	—N/a	—N/a	—N/a	—N/a	—N/a	—N/a	0.0	—N/a	—N/a	—N/a	—N/a	—N/a	—N/a	4
1957	Melbourne	25	21	1	—N/a	—N/a	—N/a	—N/a	—N/a	—N/a	0.0	—N/a	—N/a	—N/a	—N/a	—N/a	—N/a	6
1958	Melbourne	25,12	20	0	—N/a	—N/a	—N/a	—N/a	—N/a	—N/a	0.0	—N/a	—N/a	—N/a	—N/a	—N/a	—N/a	6
1959	Melbourne	25	17	2	—N/a	—N/a	—N/a	—N/a	—N/a	—N/a	0.1	—N/a	—N/a	—N/a	—N/a	—N/a	—N/a	0
1964	Melbourne	35	17	2	—N/a	—N/a	—N/a	—N/a	—N/a	—N/a	0.1	—N/a	—N/a	—N/a	—N/a	—N/a	—N/a	2
1965	Melbourne	35	17	1	2	205	21	226	56	—N/a	0.1	0.1	12.1	1.2	13.3	3.3	—N/a	9
1966	Melbourne	35	18	0	0	239	27	266	66	—N/a	0.0	0.0	13.3	1.5	14.8	3.7	—N/a	4
1967	Melbourne	35	17	0	0	237	32	269	63	—N/a	0.0	0.0	13.9	1.9	15.8	3.7	—N/a	3
1968	Melbourne	35	3	0	0	34	6	40	10	—N/a	0.0	0.0	11.3	2.0	13.3	3.3	—N/a	0
Career			205	5	2	715	86	801	195	—N/a	0.0	0.0	13.0	1.6	14.6	3.5	—N/a	45
