= Ken Melville =

Australian rules footballer (1931–2024)

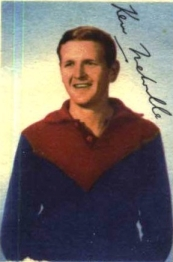
- Melville in 1954

Personal information
- Full name: Peter Kennedy Melville
- Born: 11 February 1931
- Died: 18 September 2024 (aged 93)
- Original team: University Blacks (VAFA)
- Height: 179 cm (5 ft 10 in)
- Weight: 76 kg (168 lb)

Playing career
| Years | Club | Games (Goals) |
| 1953–1956 | Melbourne | 71 (1) |

Career highlights
- 2× VFL premiership player: 1955, 1956; Keith 'Bluey' Truscott Medal: 1953

Peter Kennedy Melville (11 February 1931 – 18 September 2024) was an Australian rules footballer who played for Melbourne Football Club in the Victorian Football League (VFL).

Recruited from Victorian Amateur Football Association (VAFA) club University Blacks, Melville debuted for Melbourne in 1953 during the early period of Melbourne's golden era. He was a member of the 1955 and 1956 premiership teams before retiring at the end of the 1956 VFL season.

Melville became a Presbyterian minister, serving in Stepney, London in the 1950s and then at Benalla from 1961 to 1964.
