= Brian Dixon (Australian footballer) =

Australian rules footballer and politician (1936–2025)

The Honourable Brian Dixon

Member of the Victorian Legislative Assembly for St Kilda
- In office 1964–1982
- Preceded by: Baron Snider
- Succeeded by: Andrew McCutcheon

Personal details
- Born: 20 May 1936 Melbourne, Victoria, Australia
- Died: 9 July 2025 (aged 89)
- Party: Liberal
Australian rules football career
Personal information
- Original team: Melbourne High School
- Height: 175 cm (5 ft 9 in)
- Weight: 70 kg (154 lb)
- Position: Wing
Playing career
Years	Club	Games (Goals)
1954–1968	Melbourne	252 (41)
Coaching career
Years	Club	Games (W–L–D)
1971–1972	North Melbourne	44 (6–37–1)
Career highlights
- Club: 5× VFL premierships: 1956, 1957, 1959, 1960, 1964; Keith 'Bluey' Truscott Medallist: 1960; Melbourne Team of the Century–Wing; Melbourne Hall of Fame; Overall: Australian Football Hall of Fame; All-Australian: 1961; Tassie Medallist: 1961

Brian James Dixon (20 May 1936 – 9 July 2025) was an Australian rules footballer and politician. He was born in Melbourne.

== Football career ==
Dixon played 252 games for Melbourne in the Victorian Football League (VFL) between 1954 and 1968, playing mostly on the wing. He played in five premierships, winning Melbourne's best and fairest in 1960, while in 1961 he was selected in the All-Australian team and he also won the Tassie Medal for his performances at the 1961 Brisbane Carnival. In 2000 he was named in Melbourne's Team of the Century.

He coached North Melbourne for two seasons, 1971 and 1972.

== Political career ==
While still playing football for Melbourne, Dixon entered parliament in 1964 as the member for the now abolished seat of St Kilda, representing the Liberal Party. Being from the moderate wing of the party, he clashed with then Premier Henry Bolte, especially over the hanging of Ronald Ryan which Dixon strongly opposed.

After Rupert Hamer took over as Liberal Party leader and Premier, Dixon was promoted to the ministry. He variously served in several portfolios, including Youth, Sport and Recreation and Housing. His best-remembered achievement was introducing the iconic Life. Be in it. program.

In 1979, Dixon won St Kilda by an extremely narrow margin, which crucially gave the Hamer Liberal government a majority of one seat in the Legislative Assembly, and meant that the Liberal Party did not need to form a Coalition with the National Party, with which relations were traditionally poor in Victoria. However, in 1982, Dixon lost his seat and the Liberal Party was defeated after 27 years in power.

After his defeat, Dixon worked predominantly in sports administration and he ran public speaking seminars.

He travelled the world representing the Trim and Fitness International Sport for All Association (TAFISA) and the Asiania Sport For All Association (ASFAA). He was also president of AFL South Africa, taking a keen interest in other countries playing Australian rules football.

== Death ==
Dixon died on 9 July 2025, at the age of 89.

== Statistics ==
=== Playing statistics ===
Legend
G	Goals	K	Kicks	D	Disposals	T	Tackles
B	Behinds	H	Handballs	M	Marks

Season	Team	No.	Games	Totals							Averages (per game)						
Season	Team	No.	Games	G	B	K	H	D	M	T	G	B	K	H	D	M	T
1954	Melbourne	9	8	2	—N/a	—N/a	—N/a	—N/a	—N/a	—N/a	0.3	—N/a	—N/a	—N/a	—N/a	—N/a	—N/a
1955	Melbourne	9	16	7	—N/a	—N/a	—N/a	—N/a	—N/a	—N/a	0.4	—N/a	—N/a	—N/a	—N/a	—N/a	—N/a
1956^{#}	Melbourne	9	17	5	—N/a	—N/a	—N/a	—N/a	—N/a	—N/a	0.3	—N/a	—N/a	—N/a	—N/a	—N/a	—N/a
1957^{#}	Melbourne	9	21	2	—N/a	—N/a	—N/a	—N/a	—N/a	—N/a	0.1	—N/a	—N/a	—N/a	—N/a	—N/a	—N/a
1958	Melbourne	9,16	20	2	—N/a	—N/a	—N/a	—N/a	—N/a	—N/a	0.1	—N/a	—N/a	—N/a	—N/a	—N/a	—N/a
1959^{#}	Melbourne	9	20	2	—N/a	—N/a	—N/a	—N/a	—N/a	—N/a	0.1	—N/a	—N/a	—N/a	—N/a	—N/a	—N/a
1960^{#}	Melbourne	9	20	4	—N/a	—N/a	—N/a	—N/a	—N/a	—N/a	0.2	—N/a	—N/a	—N/a	—N/a	—N/a	—N/a
1961	Melbourne	9	16	2	—N/a	—N/a	—N/a	—N/a	—N/a	—N/a	0.1	—N/a	—N/a	—N/a	—N/a	—N/a	—N/a
1962	Melbourne	9	18	2	—N/a	—N/a	—N/a	—N/a	—N/a	—N/a	0.1	—N/a	—N/a	—N/a	—N/a	—N/a	—N/a
1963	Melbourne	9	18	3	—N/a	—N/a	—N/a	—N/a	—N/a	—N/a	0.2	—N/a	—N/a	—N/a	—N/a	—N/a	—N/a
1964^{#}	Melbourne	9	17	1	—N/a	—N/a	—N/a	—N/a	—N/a	—N/a	0.1	—N/a	—N/a	—N/a	—N/a	—N/a	—N/a
1965	Melbourne	9	13	1	2	260	23	283	78	—N/a	0.1	0.2	20.0	1.8	21.8	6.0	—N/a
1966	Melbourne	9	11	0	3	222	20	242	48	—N/a	0.0	0.3	20.2	1.8	22.0	4.4	—N/a
1967	Melbourne	9	18	6	6	357	56	413	77	—N/a	0.3	0.3	19.8	3.1	22.9	4.3	—N/a
1968	Melbourne	9	19	2	1	395	51	446	123	—N/a	0.1	0.1	20.8	2.7	23.5	6.5	—N/a
Career			252	41	12	1234	150	1384	326	—N/a	0.2	0.2	20.2	2.5	22.7	5.3	—N/a

=== Coaching statistics ===
Legend
W	Wins	L	Losses	D	Draws	W%	Winning percentage	LP	Ladder position	LT	League teams

Season	Team	Games	W	L	D	W %	LP	LT
1971	North Melbourne	22	5	16	1	25.0%	9	12
1972	North Melbourne	22	1	21	0	4.5%	12	12
Career totals		44	6	37	1	14.8%		

Victorian Legislative Assembly
Preceded by Baron Snider	Member for St Kilda; 1964–1982	Succeeded by Andrew McCutcheon
