= Keith Carroll =

Australian rules footballer (1930–2022)

Personal information
- Born: 25 March 1930; Romsey, Victoria
- Died: 23 September 2022 (aged 92); Melbourne
- Original team: Romsey
- Height: 183 cm (6 ft 0 in)
- Weight: 80 kg (176 lb)
- Position: Half back Flank/full back

Playing career^{1}
Years	Club	Games (Goals)
1952–1958	Melbourne	58 (0)
- ^{1} Playing statistics correct to the end of 1958.

Career highlights
- Named as one of the MFC ‘150 HEROES’; Premiership Player 1956 & 1957

Keith Carroll (25 March 1930 – 23 September 2022) was an Australian rules footballer who played for Melbourne in the Victorian Football League (VFL) during the 1950s.

Debuting in 1952 from the Romsey Football Club, Carroll was a half back flanker and occasional full back who never cemented his spot in the Melbourne side until the 1956 season. He played 20 games that year, including Melbourne's win over Collingwood in the Grand Final and was a premiership player again the following season, playing on the half back flank. Injuries forced his retirement in 1958, at the age of 27, marking the end of a seven-year career. Keith was named as one of the club's 150 'Heroes' in 2008 and was able to see the team win the 2021 Grand Final. Shortly before his death the Premiership Cup made a trip to Keith's house with his family in attendance.
