= Laurie Rymer =

Australian rules footballer

Personal information
- Full name: Lorance George Rymer
- Born: 5 July 1934
- Died: 5 December 2017 (aged 83)
- Original team: Somerville
- Height: 187 cm (6 ft 2 in)
- Weight: 92 kg (203 lb)

Playing career^{1}
Years	Club	Games (Goals)
1955–1957	Collingwood	25 (10)
1958–1959	Preston (VFA)	
- ^{1} Playing statistics correct to the end of 1957.

Lorance George Rymer (5 July 1934 – 5 December 2017) was an Australian rules footballer who played for the Collingwood Football Club in the Victorian Football League, (VFL).

Laurie Rymer was a ruck rover for Collingwood in the losing 1956 Grand Final against Melbourne.

== See also ==
- 1956 VFL season
