= Clyde Laidlaw =

Australian rules footballer (1933–2024)

Personal information
- Full name: Clyde Robert Laidlaw
- Born: 27 November 1933
- Died: 1 July 2024 (aged 90)
- Original team: Portland (WDFL)
- Height: 183 cm (6 ft 0 in)
- Weight: 84 kg (185 lb)

Playing career^{1}
Years	Club	Games (Goals)
1954–1962	Melbourne	124 (58)
- ^{1} Playing statistics correct to the end of 2007.

Career highlights
- 4× VFL premierships: 1955, 1956, 1959, 1960; Melbourne Hall of Fame

Clyde Robert Laidlaw (27 November 1933 – 1 July 2024) was an Australian rules footballer who played for Melbourne in the Victorian Football League (VFL). He died 1 July 2024, at the age of 90.

== Football ==
Laidlaw was a midfielder in his four winning Grand Finals in 1955, 1956, 1959 and 1960. Business commitments restricted him to just six games in 1957, with a thigh injury sidelining him from the finals series.
