= Bob Johnson (Australian footballer, born 1935) =

Australian rules footballer

Bob Johnson junior

Personal information
- Full name: Robert Bruce Johnson
- Born: 3 June 1935
- Died: 21 May 2001 (aged 65); Ohio
- Height: 198 cm (6 ft 6 in)
- Weight: 96 kg (212 lb)

Playing career^{1}
| Years | Club | Games (Goals) |
| 1954–1961 | Melbourne | 140 (267) |
| 1962–1966 | East Fremantle | 106 (359) |
| 1967 | Subiaco | 19 (34) |
| Total | | 265 (660) |

Coaching career
| Years | Club | Games (W–L–D) |
| 1962–1966 | East Fremantle | 116 (71–43–2) |
- ^{1} Playing statistics correct to the end of 1967.

Career highlights
- 5× VFL premierships: 1955, 1956, 1957, 1959, 1960; 2× Melbourne leading goalkicker: 1956, 1961; Harold Ball Memorial Trophy: 1954; Melbourne Team of the Century–emergency; Melbourne Hall of Fame; WANFL premiership: 1965; East Fremantle best and fairest: 1962; WANFL leading goalkicker: 1966

Robert Bruce Johnson (3 June 1935 – 21 May 2001) was an Australian rules footballer who played with Melbourne in the Victorian Football League (VFL) during the 1950s. His father of the same name also played for the club.

Johnson was a 198 cm ruckman and as one of the tallest footballers to have played the game earned the nickname "Big Bob". He was also regularly rested up forward where he would use his body size to gain front position and take the regular mark for a set shot at goal. He averaged almost two goals a game during his VFL career.

Johnson debuted for Melbourne at the age of 19 in 1954 and became part of the most successful era of the club's history. He went on to play in seven VFL Grand Finals for Melbourne, five of which they won. He also topped their goalkicking list in 1956 with 43 goals and 1961 with 36, the former in a premiership year.

After finishing with Melbourne, Johnson moved to Western Australia and joined East Fremantle where he served as captain-coach in their premiership side of 1965. He topped the league's goalkicking list in Western Australia with 92 goals in 1966; short though, of his effort for the previous season when he managed 105 goals. He was a Western Australian representative at the 1966 Hobart Carnival.

After a short stint with Subiaco, he returned to Victoria in 1970 where he joined Victorian Football Association club Oakleigh. He had watched Oakleigh as a boy and the club had approached him as a 15-year-old to join them but Johnson decided to join his father's old club. He broke a leg in his first game for the club which put him out for the remainder of that season. He became captain-coach of Oakleigh in 1971, and was the association's leading goalkicker for the home-and-away season that year (he was passed by Jim 'Frosty' Miller during the finals); he then led the Devils to the premiership in 1972 at the age of 37, and subsequently to Grand Final losses in 1973 and 1974 before retiring as coach. He came back to coach the club for one more season in 1976 when they finished at the bottom of the First Division ladder.

In 2012 he was inducted into the Australian Football Hall of Fame.
