= Barry Mackie =

Australian rules footballer

Personal information
- Full name: Barry A. Mackie
- Born: 28 March 1938
- Original team: Golden Point
- Height: 188 cm (6 ft 2 in)
- Weight: 82 kg (181 lb)

Playing career^{1}
Years	Club	Games (Goals)
1958–1960	Essendon	27 (8)
- ^{1} Playing statistics correct to the end of 1960.

Barry Mackie (born 28 March 1938) is a former Australian rules footballer who played with Essendon in the Victorian Football League (VFL).

Mackie, a follower from Ballarat, suffered an injury on his league debut in 1958 and didn't play another game that season. He made 16 appearances in 1959 and was one of Essendon's two reserves, who played in the grand final loss to Melbourne that year.

He returned to his original club, Golden Point, in 1961 and played with them for the season. In 1962 he joined Lemnos in the Goulburn Valley Football League and remained there for five years, the first three of which were served as captain-coach.
