= Jack Parker (footballer, born 1931) =

Australian rules footballer

Personal information
- Full name: John James Parker
- Born: 3 May 1931
- Died: 1 September 2003 (aged 72)
- Original team: North Alphington
- Height: 178 cm (5 ft 10 in)
- Weight: 85 kg (187 lb)

Playing career^{1}
Years	Club	Games (Goals)
1951–1955	Collingwood	59 (11)
- ^{1} Playing statistics correct to the end of 2007.

John James Parker (3 May 1931 – 1 September 2003) was an Australian rules footballer who played in the Victorian Football League (VFL).

He was a half back in the Collingwood's 1953 premiership side and a centreman when the Magpies was defeated by Melbourne in the 1955 Grand Final.
