= Geoff Case =

Australian rules footballer (1935–2018)

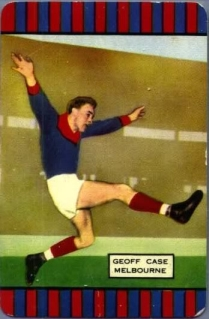

Personal information
- Full name: Geoffrey Alan Case
- Born: 15 September 1935
- Died: 22 June 2018 (aged 82)
- Original team: Melbourne Grammar School
- Height: 183 cm (6 ft 0 in)
- Weight: 81 kg (179 lb)
- Positions: Half-back flank, utility

Playing career^{1}
| Years | Club | Games (Goals) |
| 1953–1962 | Melbourne | 123 (34) |
- ^{1} Playing statistics correct to the end of 1962.

Career highlights
- 4× VFL premierships: 1955, 1957, 1959, 1960; Melbourne Hall of Fame

Geoffrey Alan Case (15 September 1935 – 22 June 2018) was an Australian rules footballer who played in the Victorian Football League (VFL).

Case was a tough midfielder and played his 122 VFL games for Melbourne, which included the 1955, 1957, 1959 and 1960 winning grand finals. He also represented the VFL, but retired at the relatively young age of just twenty-six in 1962.
