= Leo Maloney (footballer) =

Australian rules footballer

Personal information
- Full name: Leo Maloney
- Born: 28 April 1937
- Original team: Lincoln Stars
- Height: 185 cm (6 ft 1 in)
- Weight: 85 kg (187 lb)

Playing career^{1}
Years	Club	Games (Goals)
1957	Essendon	7 (2)
- ^{1} Playing statistics correct to the end of 1957.

Leo Maloney (born 28 April 1937) is a former Australian rules footballer who played with Essendon in the Victorian Football League (VFL).

Maloney came originally from the Lincoln Stars, in the Essendon District Football League.

He was Essendon's 19th man in the 1957 VFL Grand Final, which they lost to Melbourne. It was only his seventh league game and also his last, with injury keeping him out of action in 1958. Maloney then went to Williamstown in 1959 and played in their premiership team that year as well as being runner-up in the best and fairest award. He continued playing for Williamstown until 1964, when he was vice-captain. He played 107 games for the Seagulls and kicked 115 goals, featuring in the losing 1961 and 1964 VFA grand finals against Yarraville and Port Melbourne, respectively. He won the best and fairest award in 1963 and was selected in the back pocket in the Williamstown 1960's Team of the Decade.
