= Noel McMahen =

Australian rules footballer and coach (1926–2022)

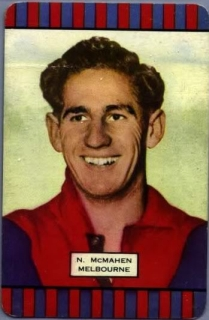

Personal information
- Full name: Noel John McMahen
- Born: 30 October 1926
- Died: 10 July 2022 (aged 95)
- Original team: Mordialloc (VFA)
- Height: 184 cm (6 ft 0 in)
- Weight: 86 kg (190 lb)

Playing career^{1}
Years	Club	Games (Goals)
1946–1956	Melbourne	175 (28)

Representative team honours
Years	Team	Games (Goals)
	Victoria	4

Coaching career
Years	Club	Games (W–L–D)
1962–1964	South Melbourne	54 (9–45–0)
- ^{1} Playing statistics correct to the end of 1956.

Career highlights
- 3× VFL premierships: 1948, 1955, 1956; Keith 'Bluey' Truscott Medallist: 1951; Melbourne captain: 1955–1956; Melbourne Team of the Century–half-back; Melbourne Hall of Fame; Sporting Life team of the year: 1954

Noel John McMahen (30 October 1926 – 10 July 2022) was an Australian rules football player and a coach in the Victorian Football League (VFL).

He played in the Melbourne premiership teams in 1948, 1955 and 1956. He captained Melbourne in his last two years before taking on the captain-coach position of Rochester Football Club in the Bendigo Football League between 1957 and 1961, leading them to premierships in 1958 and 1959 and runners up in 1960 and 1961.

When he was appointed to coach South Melbourne in 1962 he became the first full-time VFL coach. He coached South Melbourne for three years.

In 2000, Noel McMahen was selected in Melbourne's official 'Team of the Century'.
