= Barry Harrison =

Australian rules footballer

Personal information
- Born: 21 December 1935
- Died: 20 September 2004 (aged 68)
- Original team: Mentone
- Height: 188 cm (6 ft 2 in)
- Weight: 80 kg (176 lb)

Playing career^{1}
Years	Club	Games (Goals)
1958–1961	Collingwood	56 (24)
1964	North Melbourne	1 (0)
Total		57 (24)
- ^{1} Playing statistics correct to the end of 1964.

Barry 'Hooker' Harrison (21 December 1935 – 20 September 2004) was an Australian rules footballer who played for Collingwood and North Melbourne in the Victorian Football League (VFL).

Harrison, a ruckman, was known for his aggressive style of play. He spent the 1954 and 1955 seasons with the reserves and then joined the Navy as part of his national service which delayed his senior debut until 1958. His tagging job on Ron Barassi helped Collingwood win the 1958 Grand Final, as he not only kept the ball away from the Melbourne midfielder but also roughed him up, as demonstrated by his report for charging.

He was delisted at the end of the 1961 season and after an unsuccessful return to the league with North Melbourne, Harrison became captain-coach of Sandringham. From 1965 to 1969 he was coach of the VFA club, the final three years in a non playing capacity.
