= Colin Wilson (Australian footballer) =

Australian rules footballer

Personal information
- Full name: Colin Robert Wilson
- Born: 23 July 1933
- Died: 29 January 2018 (aged 84)
- Original team: Ormond (VAFA)
- Height: 191 cm (6 ft 3 in)
- Weight: 84 kg (185 lb)
- Positions: Defender, ruck-rover

Playing career^{1}
Years	Club	Games (Goals)
1954–1959	Melbourne	63 (1)
- ^{1} Playing statistics correct to the end of 1959.

Career highlights
- Melbourne premiership player 1957

Colin Robert Wilson (23 July 1933 – 29 January 2018) was an Australian rules footballer who played in the Victorian Football League (VFL).

He was a ruck rover in the Melbourne team that defeated Essendon in the 1957 VFL Grand Final.

Wilson was captain-coach of Horsham when they won the 1960 and 1962 Wimmera Football League premierships.
