= Ian Ridley =

Australian rules footballer (1934–2008)

Personal information
- Full name: Ian Jeffrey Ridley
- Born: 15 February 1934; Jeparit, Victoria
- Died: 13 November 2008 (aged 74)
- Original teams: Jeparit, Hamilton Imperials
- Height: 166 cm (5 ft 5 in)
- Weight: 68 kg (150 lb)

Playing career^{1}
| Years | Club | Games (Goals) |
| 1954–1961 | Melbourne | 130 (228) |

Coaching career
| Years | Club | Games (W–L–D) |
| 1971–1973 | Melbourne | 66 (28–37–1) |
- ^{1} Playing statistics correct to the end of 1973.

Career highlights
- 5× VFL premierships: 1955, 1956, 1957, 1959, 1960; Melbourne leading goalkicker: 1960; Melbourne Team of the Century–emergency; Melbourne Hall of Fame–Legend status

Ian Jeffrey Ridley (15 February 1934 – 13 November 2008) was an Australian rules footballer who played for Melbourne in the VFL.

== Playing career ==
Ridley was a rover who was handy around goals and a 5-time premiership player with Melbourne. He topped Melbourne's goalkicking in 1960 with 38 goals and went on to coach the club during the 1970s.

== Sports administration career ==
From 1991 until 1996, he served as the President of Melbourne Football Club. Although a well loved player, he lost his popularity with his huge push for the Demons to merge with Hawthorn. After the merger was defeated, he was replaced with Joseph Gutnick. He was named as an emergency in their official 'Team of the Century'.

== See also ==
- Melbourne Football Club/Hawthorn Football Club planned merger

== Book ==
Ridley, Ian (2002). Urge to Merge. Crown Content. ISBN 1-74095-002-X.
