= Ken Smale =

Australian rules footballer (1933–2026)

Personal information
- Born: 5 November 1933
- Died: 28 March 2026 (aged 92)
- Original team: Warracknabeal (Wimmera FL)
- Height: 185 cm (6 ft 1 in)
- Weight: 85 kg (187 lb)

Playing career
Years	Club	Games (Goals)
1955–1958	Collingwood	60 (98)

Career highlights
- Collingwood premiership player: 1958

Kenneth MacKenzie Smale (5 November 1933 – 28 March 2026) was an Australian rules footballer, who played in the Victorian Football League (VFL) for Collingwood.

== Biography ==
Born in Warracknabeal, Smale played as a forward for the town team and he won the Wimmera Football League goalkicking award in 1952 and 1953. Footscray were very interested in Smale in 1953, but he was keen to have a go in the VFL, he wrote to Collingwood asking for a try out. He spent the Easter Saturday in Melbourne with a six-game permit in case he was wanted. Collingwood was impressed and he finally got a clearance from Warracknabeal Football Club.

Smale was a forward player in the losing Grand Finals against Melbourne in 1955 and 1956 but he was on the bench when Collingwood won the 1958 VFL Grand Final.

He left Collingwood after the premiership win to return to his hometown of Warracknabeal, finishing with 324 games for the club, and winning two premierships in 1953 and 1966.

In 2008 Collingwood granted him a life membership. Smale died on 28 March 2026, at the age of 92.
