= John Beckwith (footballer) =

Australian rules footballer and coach (1932–2024)

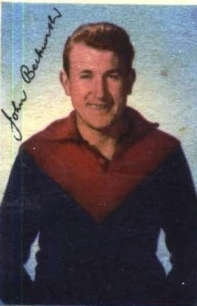

Personal information
- Full name: John Beckwith
- Born: 16 September 1932
- Died: 29 May 2024 (aged 91)
- Original team: Black Rock
- Height: 180 cm (5 ft 11 in)
- Weight: 76 kg (168 lb)

Playing career^{1}
Years	Club	Games (Goals)
1951–1960	Melbourne	176 (19)

Coaching career^{3}
Years	Club	Games (W–L–D)
1968–1970	Melbourne	62 (17–45–0)
- ^{1} Playing statistics correct to the end of 1960.^{3} Coaching statistics correct as of 1970.

Career highlights
- 5× VFL premierships: 1955, 1956, 1957, 1959, 1960; Keith 'Bluey' Truscott Medallist: 1957; Melbourne captain: 1957–59; Melbourne Team of the Century–back pocket; Melbourne Hall of Fame

John Beckwith (16 September 1932 – 29 May 2024) was an Australian rules football player and coach, for the Melbourne Football Club in the Victorian Football League (VFL).

Beckwith's father, Wally Beckwith, was a VFL player for Fitzroy and was also a VFL umpire.

Beckwith won the 1949 Federal Football League's Under 18 best and fairest award with Black Rock.

Beckwith made his debut in round one against Essendon at Windy Hill. Essendon had been premiers the previous year and as such it was the unfurling of the 1950 premiership flag. The players had to line up, and General Sir Dallas Brooks, the Governor of Victoria, came past. Beckwith was only 19 years of age, and meeting the governor as well as playing his first game of VFL football was a nerve-wracking experience, although he did end up kicking a goal.

Beckwith was a member of Melbourne premiership sides in 1955–1957 and 1959–1960. He won a club best and fairest award in 1957, and captained the club from 1957 to 1959 including two premierships. As the captain of the club's 1959 premiership team, Beckwith was notably the first player ever to hoist the VFL premiership trophy, which had been inaugurated that year.

Beckwith spent five years as captain-coach of Colac Football Club in the Hampden Football League from 1961 to 1965. Under his guidance Colac won two premierships and were runners up twice.

Beckwith was an assistant coach at Melbourne in 1966. He coached Melbourne from 1967 to 1970 for 19 wins and 46 losses.

He was named in the back pocket in Melbourne 'Team of the Century'.

== See also ==
- List of Australian rules football families
