= Harry Sullivan (footballer) =

Australian rules footballer

- Sullivan during his Collingwood career

Personal information
- Born: 8 April 1932
- Died: 5 February 2017 (aged 84)
- Original team: Brighton Technical School
- Height: 183 cm (6 ft 0 in)
- Weight: 81 kg (179 lb)

Playing career^{1}
| Years | Club | Games (Goals) |
| 1950–1954 | Carlton | 31 (16) |
| 1955–1960 | Collingwood | 78 (5) |
| Total | | 109 (21) |
- ^{1} Playing statistics correct to the end of 1960.

Career highlights
- Victorian representative in the 1958 Carnivals; Collingwood premiership side 1958

Harry Sullivan (8 April 1932 – 5 February 2017) was an Australian rules footballer, who played in the Victorian Football League, (VFL).

Harry Sullivan commenced his VFL career at Carlton in 1950 after playing in their Thirds (juniors) premiership team the previous year. In 1955 he transferred to Collingwood. He was at full back in the losing 1956 Grand Final, and in 1958 he helped Collingwood to an upset win over Melbourne in the VFL Grand Final.

Sullivan died on 5 February 2017, at the age of 84.
