= Bob Kupsch =

Australian rules footballer

Personal information
- Born: 27 November 1933
- Died: 3 March 1998 (aged 64)
- Original team: Aspendale
- Height: 175 cm (5 ft 9 in)
- Weight: 79 kg (174 lb)

Playing career^{1}
Years	Club	Games (Goals)
1954–1957	Collingwood	18 (4)
1957–1958	St Kilda	22 (0)
Total		40 (4)
- ^{1} Playing statistics correct to the end of 1958.

Robert "Bob" Kupsch (27 November 1933 – 3 March 1998) was an Australian rules footballer who played in the Victorian Football League (VFL).

Robert Kupsch, who was recruited from Edithvale-Aspendale, played in both the losing 1955 and 1956 Grand Finals for Collingwood against Melbourne. In early 1957 he transferred to St. Kilda where he played until the end of the 1958 VFL season. He coached Sandhurst in 1959 and 1960 and then Tyntynder in 1961 and 1962.
