= Frank Tuck =

Australian rules footballer and coach

- Tuck during his Collingwood career

Personal information
- Full name: Francis Henry Tuck
- Born: 24 July 1931
- Died: 1 July 2016 (aged 84); Corowa, New South Wales
- Original team: Strathmerton
- Debut: 1950, Collingwood vs. Carlton, at Victoria Park, Melbourne
- Height: 183 cm (6 ft 0 in)
- Weight: 78 kg (172 lb)

Playing career^{1}
Years	Club	Games (Goals)
1950–1959	Collingwood	131 (34)
- ^{1} Playing statistics correct to the end of 1959.

Career highlights
- Collingwood 3rd best and fairest 1957; Collingwood Captain 1958–59; Collingwood Life Member

Francis Henry Tuck (24 July 1931 – 1 July 2016) was an Australian rules footballer, who played in the Victorian Football League (VFL). He was a member of the famous Collingwood half-back line of Lucas, Kingston, and Tuck.

After VFL football, he was captain-coach of Corowa Football Club in the Ovens and Murray Football League from 1960 to 1964, and then he bought a butcher business in Birchip, Victoria.

Tuck died on 1 July 2016 aged 84.
