= Bob Greve =

Australian rules footballer

Personal information
- Born: 30 November 1934 (age 91)
- Original team: Ivanhoe Amateurs (VAFA)
- Height: 179 cm (5 ft 10 in)
- Weight: 76 kg (168 lb)

Playing career^{1}
Years	Club	Games (Goals)
1955–1959	Collingwood	67 (20)
- ^{1} Playing statistics correct to the end of 1959.

Robert Greve (born 30 November 1934) is a former Australian rules footballer, who played in the Victorian Football League (VFL).

Greve played as a second rover in most games. He was a member of the losing Collingwood team against Melbourne in the 1956 Grand Final, and saw action as a reserve in Collingwood's successful grand final team in 1958.
