= Bill Jones (Australian footballer, born 1935) =

Australian rules footballer

Personal information
- Full name: William J. Jones
- Born: 27 March 1935
- Died: 17 July 1996 (aged 61)
- Original team: Darley
- Height: 178 cm (5 ft 10 in)
- Weight: 78 kg (172 lb)
- Position: Rover

Playing career^{1}
Years	Club	Games (Goals)
1954–1958	Collingwood	60 (58)
1959–1964	Oakleigh	110 (?)
- ^{1} Playing statistics correct to the end of 1964.

William J. Jones (27 March 1935 – 17 July 1996) was an Australian rules footballer who played for Collingwood in the Victorian Football League (VFL) during the 1950s.

A rover who was also used as a half forward flanker, Jones was recruited from Darley. He appeared in the 1955 and 1956 VFL Grand Final losses for Collingwood, kicking a goal in each, the latter his 24th of the season.

Jones transferred the Victorian Football Association's Oakleigh in 1959 and was a member of their 1960 premiership team. He won the J. J. Liston Trophy in 1964 and also took home two Oakleigh 'Best and Fairest' awards, in 1963 and 1964. Appointed club captain in 1963, Jones then took on additional duties the following season by becoming captain-coach before continuing in 1965 as non-playing coach.
