= Terry Gleeson =

Australian rules footballer

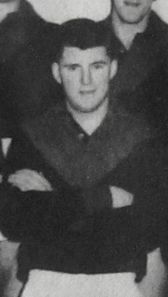

Personal information
- Full name: Gerald James Gleeson
- Born: 16 October 1933; Hamilton, Victoria
- Died: 18 February 2011 (aged 77); Sydney, Australia
- Original team: Berrigan/St Pat's Ballarat
- Height: 193 cm (6 ft 4 in)
- Weight: 92 kg (203 lb)

Playing career^{1}
Years	Club	Games (Goals)
1953–1962	Melbourne	100 (27)
- ^{1} Playing statistics correct to the end of 1962.

Career highlights
- Melbourne premiership player 1955, 1956

Gerald James "Terry" Gleeson (16 October 1933 – 18 February 2011) was an Australian rules football player in the Victorian Football League (VFL).

He was a reserve player in all his three Grand Finals in 1955, 1956 and 1958.
