= 1958 VFL season =

62nd season of the Victorian Football League (VFL)

1958 VFL premiership season
- Teams: 12
- Premiers: Collingwood; 13th premiership
- Minor premiers: Melbourne; 6th minor premiership
- Consolation series: St Kilda; 1st Consolation series win
- Brownlow Medallist: Neil Roberts (St Kilda)
- Coleman Medallist: Ian Brewer (Collingwood)
- Matches played: 112
- Highest: 99,256

The 1958 VFL season was the 62nd season of the Victorian Football League (VFL), the highest level senior Australian rules football competition in Victoria. The season, contested by twelve clubs, ran from 12 April until 20 September, and comprised an 18-game home-and-away season, followed by a finals series involving the top four clubs.

The premiership was won for the 13th time by the Collingwood Football Club, after it defeated Melbourne by 18 points in the 1958 VFL Grand Final.

== Background ==
In 1958, the VFL competition consisted of twelve teams of 18 on-the-field players each, plus two substitute players, known as the "19th man" and the "20th man". A player could be substituted for any reason but, once substituted, that player could not return to the field of play under any circumstances.

Teams played each other in a home-and-away season of 18 rounds, with matches 12 to 18 being the "home-and-way reverse" of matches 1 to 7.

Once the 18 round home-and-away season had finished, the 1958 VFL Premiership team was determined by the format and conventions of the Page–McIntyre finals system.

== Home-and-away season ==
=== Round 1 ===
Home team	Home team score	Away team	Away team score	Venue	Crowd	Date
Hawthorn	11.14 (80)	St Kilda	11.13 (79)	Glenferrie Oval	21,000	12 April 1958
Essendon	13.17 (95)	Geelong	8.10 (58)	Windy Hill	21,500	12 April 1958
South Melbourne	12.23 (95)	Richmond	17.18 (120)	Lake Oval	22,815	12 April 1958
North Melbourne	5.9 (39)	Fitzroy	23.21 (159)	Arden Street Oval	14,500	12 April 1958
Footscray	4.5 (29)	Collingwood	12.11 (83)	Western Oval	33,824	12 April 1958
Melbourne	11.13 (79)	Carlton	9.11 (65)	MCG	38,006	12 April 1958

=== Round 2 ===
Home team	Home team score	Away team	Away team score	Venue	Crowd	Date
Geelong	6.6 (42)	Melbourne	17.8 (110)	Kardinia Park	15,371	19 April 1958
Fitzroy	11.18 (84)	South Melbourne	10.15 (75)	Brunswick Street Oval	16,000	19 April 1958
Collingwood	11.9 (75)	Hawthorn	10.8 (68)	Victoria Park	28,769	19 April 1958
Carlton	9.13 (67)	North Melbourne	11.7 (73)	Princes Park	18,263	19 April 1958
Richmond	21.12 (138)	Footscray	14.12 (96)	Punt Road Oval	26,000	19 April 1958
St Kilda	17.18 (120)	Essendon	11.16 (82)	Junction Oval	30,500	19 April 1958

=== Round 3 ===
Home team	Home team score	Away team	Away team score	Venue	Crowd	Date
Richmond	11.17 (83)	St Kilda	9.14 (68)	Punt Road Oval	33,000	26 April 1958
Collingwood	7.15 (57)	Fitzroy	7.10 (52)	Victoria Park	34,656	26 April 1958
Carlton	18.7 (115)	Geelong	9.11 (65)	Princes Park	17,681	26 April 1958
North Melbourne	7.9 (51)	Melbourne	12.18 (90)	Arden Street Oval	13,500	26 April 1958
South Melbourne	13.18 (96)	Footscray	24.13 (157)	Lake Oval	21,809	26 April 1958
Hawthorn	10.14 (74)	Essendon	7.6 (48)	Glenferrie Oval	21,000	26 April 1958

=== Round 4 ===
Home team	Home team score	Away team	Away team score	Venue	Crowd	Date
Geelong	8.11 (59)	South Melbourne	8.12 (60)	Kardinia Park	14,045	3 May 1958
Footscray	7.12 (54)	North Melbourne	6.4 (40)	Western Oval	24,164	3 May 1958
Fitzroy	16.17 (113)	Richmond	8.8 (56)	Brunswick Street Oval	21,200	3 May 1958
Melbourne	11.10 (76)	Hawthorn	9.14 (68)	MCG	38,966	3 May 1958
Essendon	13.9 (87)	Collingwood	9.15 (69)	Windy Hill	28,000	3 May 1958
St Kilda	12.21 (93)	Carlton	8.7 (55)	Junction Oval	27,700	3 May 1958

=== Round 5 ===
Home team	Home team score	Away team	Away team score	Venue	Crowd	Date
Hawthorn	17.18 (120)	North Melbourne	9.4 (58)	Glenferrie Oval	13,500	10 May 1958
Geelong	11.15 (81)	Richmond	14.13 (97)	Kardinia Park	16,391	10 May 1958
Fitzroy	16.14 (110)	Footscray	7.12 (54)	Brunswick Street Oval	21,500	10 May 1958
South Melbourne	14.8 (92)	St Kilda	13.15 (93)	Lake Oval	21,000	10 May 1958
Melbourne	15.12 (102)	Essendon	12.15 (87)	MCG	41,787	10 May 1958
Collingwood	16.10 (106)	Carlton	3.15 (33)	Victoria Park	27,658	10 May 1958

=== Round 6 ===
Home team	Home team score	Away team	Away team score	Venue	Crowd	Date
Hawthorn	11.15 (81)	South Melbourne	8.16 (64)	Glenferrie Oval	18,500	17 May 1958
Footscray	6.22 (58)	Geelong	10.15 (75)	Western Oval	21,479	17 May 1958
Carlton	4.16 (40)	Fitzroy	8.11 (59)	Princes Park	18,900	17 May 1958
St Kilda	12.7 (79)	Melbourne	11.12 (78)	Junction Oval	32,000	17 May 1958
North Melbourne	9.10 (64)	Essendon	7.13 (55)	Arden Street Oval	15,000	17 May 1958
Richmond	8.8 (56)	Collingwood	13.17 (95)	Punt Road Oval	37,000	17 May 1958

=== Round 7 ===
Home team	Home team score	Away team	Away team score	Venue	Crowd	Date
Geelong	9.16 (70)	St Kilda	6.8 (44)	Kardinia Park	16,440	24 May 1958
Fitzroy	12.15 (87)	Hawthorn	8.15 (63)	Brunswick Street Oval	21,000	24 May 1958
Essendon	11.16 (82)	Richmond	9.14 (68)	Windy Hill	19,500	24 May 1958
Melbourne	11.19 (85)	Footscray	9.8 (62)	MCG	28,550	24 May 1958
North Melbourne	9.8 (62)	Collingwood	7.17 (59)	Arden Street Oval	16,000	24 May 1958
South Melbourne	10.19 (79)	Carlton	7.15 (57)	Lake Oval	17,100	24 May 1958

=== Round 8 ===
Home team	Home team score	Away team	Away team score	Venue	Crowd	Date
Melbourne	12.18 (90)	Richmond	12.11 (83)	MCG	35,352	31 May 1958
Geelong	4.11 (35)	North Melbourne	14.18 (102)	Kardinia Park	19,710	31 May 1958
Collingwood	20.20 (140)	South Melbourne	9.12 (66)	Victoria Park	26,250	31 May 1958
Carlton	9.14 (68)	Hawthorn	9.6 (60)	Princes Park	16,500	31 May 1958
St Kilda	12.17 (89)	Fitzroy	6.14 (50)	Junction Oval	29,000	31 May 1958
Footscray	16.11 (107)	Essendon	13.14 (92)	Western Oval	29,118	31 May 1958

=== Round 9 ===
Home team	Home team score	Away team	Away team score	Venue	Crowd	Date
Fitzroy	8.18 (66)	Geelong	6.15 (51)	Brunswick Street Oval	15,000	7 June 1958
Collingwood	12.23 (95)	St Kilda	5.9 (39)	Victoria Park	36,500	7 June 1958
Richmond	12.11 (83)	North Melbourne	14.10 (94)	Punt Road Oval	18,500	7 June 1958
South Melbourne	11.10 (76)	Melbourne	16.12 (108)	Lake Oval	18,860	7 June 1958
Hawthorn	11.14 (80)	Footscray	8.10 (58)	Glenferrie Oval	19,000	7 June 1958
Essendon	5.19 (49)	Carlton	7.8 (50)	Windy Hill	26,500	7 June 1958

=== Round 10 ===
Home team	Home team score	Away team	Away team score	Venue	Crowd	Date
Essendon	16.11 (107)	Fitzroy	8.8 (56)	Windy Hill	15,500	14 June 1958
Carlton	6.15 (51)	Richmond	2.9 (21)	Princes Park	16,000	14 June 1958
St Kilda	8.15 (63)	Footscray	11.16 (82)	Junction Oval	20,000	14 June 1958
North Melbourne	12.15 (87)	South Melbourne	8.9 (57)	Arden Street Oval	15,000	16 June 1958
Hawthorn	14.19 (103)	Geelong	8.6 (54)	Glenferrie Oval	16,000	16 June 1958
Melbourne	12.12 (84)	Collingwood	10.13 (73)	MCG	99,256	16 June 1958

=== Round 11 ===
Home team	Home team score	Away team	Away team score	Venue	Crowd	Date
North Melbourne	8.12 (60)	St Kilda	5.5 (35)	Arden Street Oval	14,000	21 June 1958
Fitzroy	12.16 (88)	Melbourne	6.11 (47)	Brunswick Street Oval	22,000	21 June 1958
Richmond	15.11 (101)	Hawthorn	13.9 (87)	Punt Road Oval	16,000	21 June 1958
South Melbourne	8.13 (61)	Essendon	15.13 (103)	Lake Oval	18,500	21 June 1958
Geelong	9.12 (66)	Collingwood	14.15 (99)	Kardinia Park	18,313	21 June 1958
Footscray	11.8 (74)	Carlton	10.24 (84)	Western Oval	26,080	21 June 1958

=== Round 12 ===
Home team	Home team score	Away team	Away team score	Venue	Crowd	Date
Richmond	12.13 (85)	South Melbourne	11.8 (74)	Punt Road Oval	16,000	28 June 1958
Fitzroy	12.17 (89)	North Melbourne	7.16 (58)	Brunswick Street Oval	24,000	28 June 1958
Collingwood	12.13 (85)	Footscray	10.14 (74)	Victoria Park	21,514	28 June 1958
Carlton	9.14 (68)	Melbourne	12.12 (84)	Princes Park	23,883	28 June 1958
St Kilda	11.14 (80)	Hawthorn	14.14 (98)	Junction Oval	20,400	28 June 1958
Geelong	15.9 (99)	Essendon	12.12 (84)	Kardinia Park	15,988	28 June 1958

=== Round 13 ===
Home team	Home team score	Away team	Away team score	Venue	Crowd	Date
Footscray	14.12 (96)	Richmond	2.11 (23)	Western Oval	17,305	19 July 1958
Essendon	17.30 (132)	St Kilda	8.9 (57)	Windy Hill	14,300	19 July 1958
Melbourne	16.22 (118)	Geelong	12.12 (84)	MCG	21,395	19 July 1958
South Melbourne	19.6 (120)	Fitzroy	11.22 (88)	Lake Oval	12,000	19 July 1958
Hawthorn	12.14 (86)	Collingwood	14.9 (93)	Glenferrie Oval	22,500	19 July 1958
North Melbourne	8.9 (57)	Carlton	6.9 (45)	Arden Street Oval	18,000	19 July 1958

=== Round 14 ===
Home team	Home team score	Away team	Away team score	Venue	Crowd	Date
Melbourne	10.12 (72)	North Melbourne	8.15 (63)	MCG	30,489	26 July 1958
Footscray	8.15 (63)	South Melbourne	14.12 (96)	Western Oval	19,508	26 July 1958
Essendon	11.15 (81)	Hawthorn	7.7 (49)	Windy Hill	17,500	26 July 1958
St Kilda	10.12 (72)	Richmond	9.10 (64)	Junction Oval	14,160	26 July 1958
Fitzroy	15.15 (105)	Collingwood	8.9 (57)	Brunswick Street Oval	31,000	26 July 1958
Geelong	7.11 (53)	Carlton	8.21 (69)	Kardinia Park	14,482	26 July 1958

=== Round 15 ===
Home team	Home team score	Away team	Away team score	Venue	Crowd	Date
Hawthorn	12.15 (87)	Melbourne	14.11 (95)	Glenferrie Oval	17,500	2 August 1958
Collingwood	11.9 (75)	Essendon	12.14 (86)	Victoria Park	34,490	2 August 1958
Carlton	8.11 (59)	St Kilda	7.12 (54)	Princes Park	12,984	2 August 1958
South Melbourne	16.13 (109)	Geelong	14.17 (101)	Lake Oval	13,000	2 August 1958
North Melbourne	11.13 (79)	Footscray	9.8 (62)	Arden Street Oval	17,000	2 August 1958
Richmond	10.8 (68)	Fitzroy	19.18 (132)	Punt Road Oval	17,000	2 August 1958

=== Round 16 ===
Home team	Home team score	Away team	Away team score	Venue	Crowd	Date
St Kilda	9.23 (77)	South Melbourne	15.9 (99)	Junction Oval	16,500	9 August 1958
Essendon	11.12 (78)	Melbourne	10.15 (75)	Windy Hill	25,000	9 August 1958
Carlton	7.11 (53)	Collingwood	10.12 (72)	Princes Park	24,000	9 August 1958
North Melbourne	7.18 (60)	Hawthorn	13.14 (92)	Arden Street Oval	11,500	9 August 1958
Richmond	12.18 (90)	Geelong	9.15 (69)	Punt Road Oval	8,500	9 August 1958
Footscray	20.11 (131)	Fitzroy	5.11 (41)	Western Oval	18,982	9 August 1958

=== Round 17 ===
Home team	Home team score	Away team	Away team score	Venue	Crowd	Date
Melbourne	21.11 (137)	St Kilda	13.9 (87)	MCG	27,500	16 August 1958
Essendon	8.14 (62)	North Melbourne	11.14 (80)	Windy Hill	27,500	16 August 1958
Collingwood	16.11 (107)	Richmond	13.10 (88)	Victoria Park	21,027	16 August 1958
South Melbourne	6.14 (50)	Hawthorn	6.12 (48)	Lake Oval	17,500	16 August 1958
Geelong	13.14 (92)	Footscray	12.13 (85)	Kardinia Park	12,147	16 August 1958
Fitzroy	15.11 (101)	Carlton	13.18 (96)	Brunswick Street Oval	20,000	16 August 1958

=== Round 18 ===
Home team	Home team score	Away team	Away team score	Venue	Crowd	Date
Footscray	8.11 (59)	Melbourne	10.18 (78)	Western Oval	21,132	23 August 1958
Collingwood	12.16 (88)	North Melbourne	14.17 (101)	Victoria Park	36,098	23 August 1958
Carlton	12.11 (83)	South Melbourne	10.21 (81)	Princes Park	17,897	23 August 1958
St Kilda	16.15 (111)	Geelong	5.8 (38)	Junction Oval	13,200	23 August 1958
Hawthorn	11.9 (75)	Fitzroy	10.11 (71)	Glenferrie Oval	15,650	23 August 1958
Richmond	15.11 (101)	Essendon	16.13 (109)	Punt Road Oval	20,000	23 August 1958

== Ladder ==
(P)	Premiers
	Qualified for finals

#	Team	P	W	L	D	PF	PA	%	Pts
1	Melbourne	18	15	3	0	1608	1300	123.7	60
2	Collingwood (P)	18	12	6	0	1528	1235	123.7	48
3	Fitzroy	18	12	6	0	1551	1283	120.9	48
4	North Melbourne	18	11	7	0	1228	1324	92.7	44
5	Essendon	18	10	8	0	1519	1365	111.3	40
6	Hawthorn	18	9	9	0	1419	1298	109.3	36
7	Carlton	18	8	10	0	1158	1260	91.9	32
8	St Kilda	18	7	11	0	1340	1454	92.2	28
9	South Melbourne	18	7	11	0	1450	1634	88.7	28
10	Richmond	18	7	11	0	1425	1611	88.5	28
11	Footscray	18	6	12	0	1401	1440	97.3	24
12	Geelong	18	4	14	0	1192	1615	73.8	16

Rules for classification: 1. premiership points; 2. percentage; 3. points for
Average score: 77.9
Source: AFL Tables

== Finals series ==
=== Semi-finals ===
Team	1 Qtr	2 Qtr	3 Qtr	Final
Fitzroy	3.3	4.7	5.8	9.12 (66)
North Melbourne	2.2	4.6	8.8	10.10 (70)
Attendance: 68,213

Team	1 Qtr	2 Qtr	3 Qtr	Final
Melbourne	5.0	6.4	8.5	11.12 (78)
Collingwood	1.0	2.4	3.8	4.9 (33)
Attendance: 77,350

=== Preliminary final ===
Team	1 Qtr	2 Qtr	3 Qtr	Final
Collingwood	5.5	6.5	11.8	14.12 (96)
North Melbourne	1.1	2.10	4.11	10.16 (76)
Attendance: 77,656

=== Grand final ===
Team	1 Qtr	2 Qtr	3 Qtr	Final
Melbourne	5.1	7.4	7.6	9.10 (64)
Collingwood	2.2	7.6	12.9	12.10 (82)
Attendance: 97,956

== Consolation Night Series Competition ==
The night series were held under the floodlights at Lake Oval, South Melbourne, for the teams (5th to 12th on ladder) out of the finals at the end of the season.

Final: St Kilda 16.13 (109) defeated Carlton 15.11 (101)

== Season notes ==
- On Monday 2 June 1958, following his superb performance in Footscray's unexpected round 8 fifteen-point victory over Essendon, Sun News Pictorial journalist Rex Pullen christens Ted Whitten "Mr. Football".
- The game between Melbourne and Collingwood on the Queen's Birthday public holiday drew a crowd of 99,256, which remains as the highest attendance for a home-and-away game in VFL/AFL history as of 2025.
- The sixteen match 1958 Australian National Football (ANFC) Carnival is held in Melbourne during a two-week break in the VFL competition, between rounds 12 and 13. ANFC President, Pat Rodriguez, remarked that the total attendance of 90,261 spectators at the sixteen matches was an insult to the rest of Australia by the Victorian football community.
- In the last moments of the third quarter of the round 16 match between South Melbourne and St Kilda, South Melbourne winger Ian Tampion received a free kick. The siren went and Tampion, thinking that he was too far away from the goal to score, gave the ball the field umpire, Bill Barbour, and went to join the three-quarter-time South Melbourne team huddle. South Melbourne captain-coach, Ron Clegg, insisted that he "have a go" and not waste the chance. Tampion retrieved the ball from the umpire and kicked an 80-yard (73 m) drop-kick that scored a goal, travelling over the heads of the St Kilda defenders, who had moved up the field towards him, not expecting him to be able to kick such a distance.
- Immediately after the round 18 matches were finished on Saturday 23 August, the evening newspaper The Sporting Globe announced that Neil Roberts, of St Kilda, was the winner of its Haydn Bunton Memorial Medal. The medal came with a cash prize of £100 and, by accepting the prize, Roberts, who up to that time had played as an amateur, turned professional.
  - Therefore, although playing the entire 1958 season as an "amateur", as did Don Cordner in 1946 and John Schultz in 1960, unlike both Cordner and Schultz, he was a professional when the winner of the Brownlow Medal was announced on Tuesday, 26 August.
- Collingwood caused a Grand Final upset by unexpectedly thwarting Melbourne's attempt to equal Collingwood's record of four premierships in a row, from 1927 to 1930.
- In order to increase the sales of the VFL's Football Record which, in addition to the selected player lists, also listed the number that each player would carry on the back of their club guernsey, the Grand Final teams (Collingwood and Melbourne) were ordered to change the "regular" (i.e. registered with the VFL) playing numbers for each player for that specific match, and only for that match. Unless one is aware that the numbers on the back of players' guernseys on that day did not correspond to the numbers they wore in every other match, one can be confused when viewing photographs or films of the game, or when looking at other references relating to that match, such as the Football Record.
  - By VFL convention, and unlike most other football codes that display playing-position-indicating-numbers on a team's kit/strip/uniform – e.g. Rugby union, Rugby league, Gridiron football, etc. – the number on the back of an Australian rules footballer's guernsey:
    - (a) had no connection with the position on the field that the individual occupied in any particular match,
    - (b) was issued by the player's football club prior to their first match with that club, and was then registered against that player's name, by the VFL,
    - (c) usually remained unchanged throughout a player's career with that club, and
    - (d) was often, as was the case of Ron Barassi's number 31, retained by a player when he transferred from one team to another.
    - (a) to (d) remain the convention with the AFL.
- The reason for the last-minute move by the VFL to alter players normal numbers for the Grand Final was to nullify an attempt by university students to reduce VFL's income stream by issuing free team sheets – containing the Grand Final players' names, their (regular) guernsey numbers, and their official selected team positions (as announced on the Thursday evening prior to the match) – outside the Melbourne Cricket Ground on the day of the match.

== Awards ==
- The 1958 VFL Premiership team was Collingwood.
- The VFL's leading goalkicker was Ian Brewer of Collingwood who kicked 97 goals (including 6 goals in the finals).
- The winner of the 1958 Brownlow Medal was to Neil Roberts of St Kilda with 20 votes.
- Geelong won the "wooden spoon" in 1958. As of 2024, it is Geelong's most recent wooden spoon, meaning that the club has the longest "spoon drought" in the VFL/AFL.

== Sources ==
- 1958 VFL season at AFL Tables
- 1958 VFL season at Australian Football
