= Lerrel Sharp =

Australian rules footballer (1933–2020)

Personal information
- Full name: Lerrel Keith Sharp
- Born: 6 June 1933
- Died: 15 December 2020 (aged 87)
- Original team: Scottsdale (NTFA)
- Height: 178 cm (5 ft 10 in)
- Weight: 76 kg (168 lb)

Playing career^{1}
Years	Club	Games (Goals)
1953–1959	Collingwood	87 (1)
- ^{1} Playing statistics correct to the end of 1959.

Career highlights
- Collingwood premiership side 1953; Collingwood Victorian representative 3 times

Lerrel Keith Sharp (6 June 1933 – 15 December 2020) was an Australian rules footballer, who played for Scottsdale and North Launceston in the Northern Tasmanian Football Association (NTFL) and Collingwood in the Victorian Football League (VFL).

He began his senior career with Scottsdale in the Northern Tasmanian Football Association. After a number of years at Collingwood Sharp returned to Tasmania and played with North Launceston in the NTFA. He is an inductee in the AFL Tasmania Hall of Fame.
