= Peter Marquis =

Australian rules footballer

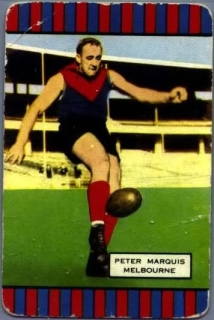

Personal information
- Full name: Peter Alan John Marquis
- Born: 13 March 1932; Derby, Tasmania
- Died: 4 March 2005 (aged 72); Hobart, Tasmania
- Original team: Devonport (NWFU)
- Height: 183 cm (72 in)
- Weight: 89 kg (196 lb)

Playing career^{1}
| Years | Club | Games (Goals) |
| 1953–1958 | Melbourne | 99 (7) |
- ^{1} Playing statistics correct to the end of 1958.

Career highlights
- Melbourne premiership player 1955, 1956, 1957

Peter Alan John Marquis (13 March 1932 – 4 March 2005) was an Australian rules footballer who played in Tasmania and Victoria during the 1950s and 1960s. He was inducted into the Tasmanian Football Hall of Fame in 2005.

Marquis began his senior career in 1950 with Devonport in the North West Football Union (NWFU). The next season, he won the club's Best and Fairest award, as well as playing for both the NWFU and Tasmania in representative matches.

In 1953, Peter Marquis began his six-year auspicious career with Melbourne in the Victorian Football League (VFL), and played as a full back when the Demons overcame Collingwood in the close 1955 and 1956 Grand Final matches. He also collected premiership honours when his team beat Essendon in 1957.

Later he returned to Tasmania and played with North Hobart in the Tasmanian Football League (TFL).

Marquis is the grandfather of North Melbourne Football Club player, Hugh Greenwood.
