= Ian McLean (footballer) =

Australian rules footballer

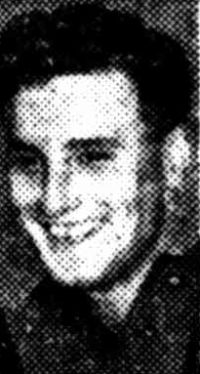

Personal information
- Born: 27 August 1929; Bendigo, Victoria
- Died: 23 March 1965 (aged 35); Chadstone, Victoria
- Original team: South Bendigo (BFL)
- Height: 175 cm (5 ft 9 in)
- Weight: 71 kg (157 lb)

Playing career^{1}
Years	Club	Games (Goals)
1951–1960	Melbourne	146 (29)
- ^{1} Playing statistics correct to the end of 1960.

Career highlights
- Melbourne premiership player 1955, 1957, 1959

Ian McLean (27 August 1929 – 23 March 1965) was an Australian rules football player in the Victorian Football League, (VFL).

== Family ==
The son of Alexander Leonard McLean (1887–1956), and Elsie May McLean (1888–1961), née Robertson, Ian McLean was born at Bendigo, Victoria on 27 August 1929.

He married Rita Joan Driver in 1955.

== Football ==
Ian McLean played in Melbourne premiership teams in 1955, 1957 and 1959, and well as the runner-up side of 1954. Courageous, quick both over the ground and in terms of reflexes, and a smooth ball handler, McLean, who hailed from Bendigo, played a total of 146 VFL games and booted 29 goals for the Demons between 1951 and 1960.

== Death ==
He died at his residence in Chadstone, Victoria on 23 March 1965.
