= Peter Lucas (footballer) =

Australian rules footballer (1929–2019)

Personal information
- Full name: Peter Hedley Lucas
- Born: 23 November 1929
- Died: 16 September 2019 (aged 89); Nudgee, Queensland
- Original team: Hampton Rovers (VAFA)

Playing career^{1}
Years	Club	Games (Goals)
1949–1959	Collingwood	177 (1)
- ^{1} Playing statistics correct to the end of 1959.

Career highlights
- Collingwood premiership side 1958

Peter Lucas (23 November 1929 – 16 September 2019) was an Australian rules footballer, who played for Collingwood in the Victorian Football League (VFL).

Peter Lucas was a regular half back flanker in the Collingwood team. His 177 VFL games between 1949 and 1959 included the winning 1958 Grand Final against Melbourne. He was a member of what the historian (and passionate Carlton supporter) Manning Clark called, 31 years after it had last played together, "that great half-back line of Lucas, Kingston and Tuck". Later Lucas was an administrator and general manager at Collingwood after retiring from playing football in 1959.
