= 1957 VFL season =

61st season of the Victorian Football League (VFL)

1957 VFL premiership season
- Teams: 12
- Premiers: Melbourne; 9th premiership
- Minor premiers: Melbourne; 5th minor premiership
- Consolation series: South Melbourne; 2nd Consolation series win
- Brownlow Medallist: Brian Gleeson (St Kilda)
- Coleman Medallist: Jack Collins (Footscray)
- Matches played: 112
- Highest: 100,324

The 1957 VFL season was the 61st season of the Victorian Football League (VFL), the highest level senior Australian rules football competition in Victoria. The season featured twelve clubs, ran from 20 April until 21 September, and comprised an 18-game home-and-away season followed by a finals series featuring the top four clubs.

The premiership was won by the Melbourne Football Club for the ninth time and third time consecutively, after it defeated Essendon by 61 points in the 1957 VFL Grand Final.

== Background ==
In 1957, the VFL competition consisted of twelve teams of 18 on-the-field players each, plus two substitute players, known as the 19th man and the 20th man. A player could be substituted for any reason; however, once substituted, a player could not return to the field of play under any circumstances.

Teams played each other in a home-and-away season of 18 rounds; matches 12 to 18 were the "home-and-way reverse" of matches 1 to 7.

Once the 18 round home-and-away season had finished, the 1957 VFL Premiers were determined by the specific format and conventions of the Page–McIntyre system.

== Home-and-away season ==
=== Round 1 ===
Home team	Home team score	Away team	Away team score	Venue	Crowd	Date
St Kilda	12.16 (88)	South Melbourne	7.17 (59)	Junction Oval	37,000	20 April 1957
Collingwood	8.10 (58)	Essendon	13.15 (93)	Victoria Park	30,000	20 April 1957
Carlton	10.6 (66)	Hawthorn	15.12 (102)	Princes Park	24,321	20 April 1957
Fitzroy	7.11 (53)	Melbourne	6.14 (50)	Brunswick Street Oval	24,000	22 April 1957
Richmond	19.14 (128)	North Melbourne	15.15 (105)	Punt Road Oval	23,000	22 April 1957
Geelong	11.11 (77)	Footscray	10.17 (77)	Kardinia Park	34,844	22 April 1957

=== Round 2 ===
Home team	Home team score	Away team	Away team score	Venue	Crowd	Date
Hawthorn	9.22 (76)	Richmond	8.9 (57)	Glenferrie Oval	21,000	27 April 1957
Footscray	12.13 (85)	St Kilda	7.11 (53)	Western Oval	29,497	27 April 1957
Essendon	11.8 (74)	Fitzroy	8.15 (63)	Windy Hill	21,500	27 April 1957
North Melbourne	9.13 (67)	Geelong	10.13 (73)	Arden Street Oval	12,000	27 April 1957
Melbourne	10.20 (80)	Collingwood	10.12 (72)	MCG	45,571	27 April 1957
South Melbourne	6.16 (52)	Carlton	10.16 (76)	Lake Oval	22,385	27 April 1957

=== Round 3 ===
Home team	Home team score	Away team	Away team score	Venue	Crowd	Date
Fitzroy	12.16 (88)	St Kilda	9.11 (65)	Brunswick Street Oval	17,000	4 May 1957
South Melbourne	19.16 (130)	Richmond	13.9 (87)	Lake Oval	19,275	4 May 1957
North Melbourne	13.9 (87)	Hawthorn	11.12 (78)	Arden Street Oval	11,000	4 May 1957
Melbourne	11.20 (86)	Essendon	5.11 (41)	MCG	42,920	4 May 1957
Geelong	12.5 (77)	Collingwood	12.15 (87)	Kardinia Park	24,292	4 May 1957
Footscray	9.10 (64)	Carlton	7.9 (51)	Western Oval	34,878	4 May 1957

=== Round 4 ===
Home team	Home team score	Away team	Away team score	Venue	Crowd	Date
Hawthorn	6.15 (51)	Melbourne	4.9 (33)	Glenferrie Oval	20,000	11 May 1957
Essendon	11.14 (80)	Footscray	4.14 (38)	Windy Hill	30,000	11 May 1957
Collingwood	14.9 (93)	South Melbourne	11.17 (83)	Victoria Park	32,500	11 May 1957
Carlton	15.12 (102)	Geelong	13.11 (89)	Princes Park	28,888	11 May 1957
St Kilda	16.5 (101)	North Melbourne	12.12 (84)	Junction Oval	20,000	11 May 1957
Richmond	16.10 (106)	Fitzroy	10.31 (91)	Punt Road Oval	16,500	11 May 1957

=== Round 5 ===
Home team	Home team score	Away team	Away team score	Venue	Crowd	Date
Melbourne	17.17 (119)	St Kilda	13.12 (90)	MCG	35,682	18 May 1957
Geelong	9.10 (64)	Hawthorn	3.19 (37)	Kardinia Park	18,000	18 May 1957
Collingwood	12.12 (84)	Fitzroy	13.4 (82)	Victoria Park	29,783	18 May 1957
Carlton	16.22 (118)	Richmond	13.16 (94)	Princes Park	28,936	18 May 1957
North Melbourne	9.16 (70)	Footscray	9.14 (68)	Arden Street Oval	19,000	18 May 1957
South Melbourne	7.16 (58)	Essendon	14.16 (100)	Lake Oval	27,500	18 May 1957

=== Round 6 ===
Home team	Home team score	Away team	Away team score	Venue	Crowd	Date
Melbourne	17.12 (114)	South Melbourne	6.15 (51)	MCG	28,250	25 May 1957
Footscray	14.14 (98)	Richmond	10.19 (79)	Western Oval	24,902	25 May 1957
Essendon	9.12 (66)	Hawthorn	11.8 (74)	Windy Hill	22,000	25 May 1957
St Kilda	10.13 (73)	Geelong	13.5 (83)	Junction Oval	24,000	25 May 1957
North Melbourne	13.13 (91)	Collingwood	10.16 (76)	Arden Street Oval	20,000	25 May 1957
Fitzroy	12.10 (82)	Carlton	14.12 (96)	Brunswick Street Oval	24,500	25 May 1957

=== Round 7 ===
Home team	Home team score	Away team	Away team score	Venue	Crowd	Date
Collingwood	12.16 (88)	St Kilda	8.9 (57)	Victoria Park	23,458	1 June 1957
Carlton	13.9 (87)	Essendon	7.20 (62)	Princes Park	34,740	1 June 1957
South Melbourne	11.9 (75)	North Melbourne	11.13 (79)	Lake Oval	15,000	1 June 1957
Richmond	7.10 (52)	Melbourne	6.14 (50)	Punt Road Oval	16,000	1 June 1957
Hawthorn	11.11 (77)	Footscray	7.8 (50)	Glenferrie Oval	26,000	1 June 1957
Geelong	14.15 (99)	Fitzroy	17.11 (113)	Kardinia Park	17,240	1 June 1957

=== Round 8 ===
Home team	Home team score	Away team	Away team score	Venue	Crowd	Date
Richmond	11.15 (81)	St Kilda	10.19 (79)	Punt Road Oval	21,000	8 June 1957
Fitzroy	10.11 (71)	North Melbourne	10.17 (77)	Brunswick Street Oval	15,000	8 June 1957
Essendon	21.12 (138)	Geelong	15.12 (102)	Windy Hill	22,000	8 June 1957
Carlton	10.11 (71)	Melbourne	14.15 (99)	Princes Park	31,096	8 June 1957
South Melbourne	9.14 (68)	Hawthorn	13.11 (89)	Lake Oval	18,200	8 June 1957
Footscray	12.17 (89)	Collingwood	6.4 (40)	Western Oval	34,742	8 June 1957

=== Round 9 ===
Home team	Home team score	Away team	Away team score	Venue	Crowd	Date
Collingwood	12.13 (85)	Richmond	13.14 (92)	Victoria Park	32,280	15 June 1957
St Kilda	3.12 (30)	Essendon	9.21 (75)	Junction Oval	33,500	15 June 1957
North Melbourne	7.14 (56)	Carlton	8.15 (63)	Arden Street Oval	28,000	15 June 1957
Footscray	12.15 (87)	South Melbourne	8.12 (60)	Western Oval	28,450	17 June 1957
Melbourne	23.16 (154)	Geelong	14.10 (94)	MCG	48,001	17 June 1957
Hawthorn	15.14 (104)	Fitzroy	7.14 (56)	Glenferrie Oval	23,000	17 June 1957

=== Round 10 ===
Home team	Home team score	Away team	Away team score	Venue	Crowd	Date
Geelong	10.8 (68)	South Melbourne	10.10 (70)	Kardinia Park	12,456	22 June 1957
Fitzroy	9.14 (68)	Footscray	14.14 (98)	Brunswick Street Oval	17,500	22 June 1957
North Melbourne	11.12 (78)	Melbourne	16.13 (109)	Arden Street Oval	14,000	22 June 1957
St Kilda	10.15 (75)	Hawthorn	8.11 (59)	Junction Oval	21,000	22 June 1957
Richmond	13.10 (88)	Essendon	7.19 (61)	Punt Road Oval	25,000	22 June 1957
Collingwood	14.16 (100)	Carlton	9.9 (63)	Victoria Park	33,345	22 June 1957

=== Round 11 ===
Home team	Home team score	Away team	Away team score	Venue	Crowd	Date
Geelong	10.9 (69)	Richmond	14.8 (92)	Kardinia Park	18,177	29 June 1957
Essendon	11.14 (80)	North Melbourne	13.11 (89)	Windy Hill	18,500	29 June 1957
Carlton	13.14 (92)	St Kilda	7.13 (55)	Princes Park	21,454	29 June 1957
Melbourne	12.15 (87)	Footscray	7.9 (51)	MCG	49,512	29 June 1957
South Melbourne	15.19 (109)	Fitzroy	14.12 (96)	Lake Oval	16,200	29 June 1957
Hawthorn	10.14 (74)	Collingwood	13.15 (93)	Glenferrie Oval	27,000	29 June 1957

=== Round 12 ===
Home team	Home team score	Away team	Away team score	Venue	Crowd	Date
North Melbourne	17.15 (117)	Richmond	10.13 (73)	Arden Street Oval	21,000	6 July 1957
Footscray	9.11 (65)	Geelong	9.10 (64)	Western Oval	23,578	6 July 1957
South Melbourne	11.15 (81)	St Kilda	9.17 (71)	Lake Oval	18,000	6 July 1957
Melbourne	24.14 (158)	Fitzroy	10.14 (74)	MCG	21,370	6 July 1957
Essendon	12.16 (88)	Collingwood	10.13 (73)	Windy Hill	26,500	6 July 1957
Hawthorn	7.10 (52)	Carlton	8.13 (61)	Glenferrie Oval	26,000	6 July 1957

=== Round 13 ===
Home team	Home team score	Away team	Away team score	Venue	Crowd	Date
Geelong	12.15 (87)	North Melbourne	8.13 (61)	Kardinia Park	14,806	13 July 1957
Collingwood	7.7 (49)	Melbourne	6.13 (49)	Victoria Park	24,216	13 July 1957
Carlton	11.15 (81)	South Melbourne	10.5 (65)	Princes Park	20,572	13 July 1957
Richmond	11.12 (78)	Hawthorn	10.15 (75)	Punt Road Oval	22,000	13 July 1957
St Kilda	14.16 (100)	Footscray	14.8 (92)	Junction Oval	24,400	13 July 1957
Fitzroy	7.10 (52)	Essendon	9.18 (72)	Brunswick Street Oval	12,500	13 July 1957

=== Round 14 ===
Home team	Home team score	Away team	Away team score	Venue	Crowd	Date
Richmond	10.13 (73)	South Melbourne	11.12 (78)	Punt Road Oval	21,000	27 July 1957
Hawthorn	7.13 (55)	North Melbourne	5.4 (34)	Glenferrie Oval	10,000	27 July 1957
Essendon	9.18 (72)	Melbourne	11.7 (73)	Windy Hill	22,500	27 July 1957
Collingwood	13.14 (92)	Geelong	6.8 (44)	Victoria Park	21,316	27 July 1957
Carlton	11.13 (79)	Footscray	7.10 (52)	Princes Park	31,810	27 July 1957
St Kilda	15.18 (108)	Fitzroy	8.8 (56)	Junction Oval	14,500	27 July 1957

=== Round 15 ===
Home team	Home team score	Away team	Away team score	Venue	Crowd	Date
North Melbourne	13.11 (89)	St Kilda	14.9 (93)	Arden Street Oval	10,000	3 August 1957
Fitzroy	15.13 (103)	Richmond	13.13 (91)	Brunswick Street Oval	12,000	3 August 1957
Melbourne	8.18 (66)	Hawthorn	10.13 (73)	MCG	32,163	3 August 1957
Footscray	7.8 (50)	Essendon	12.11 (83)	Western Oval	24,942	3 August 1957
South Melbourne	9.13 (67)	Collingwood	12.19 (91)	Lake Oval	25,300	3 August 1957
Geelong	11.19 (85)	Carlton	6.7 (43)	Kardinia Park	16,808	3 August 1957

=== Round 16 ===
Home team	Home team score	Away team	Away team score	Venue	Crowd	Date
Footscray	6.6 (42)	North Melbourne	8.13 (61)	Western Oval	13,325	10 August 1957
Essendon	10.15 (75)	South Melbourne	7.13 (55)	Windy Hill	16,000	10 August 1957
St Kilda	1.5 (11)	Melbourne	6.13 (49)	Junction Oval	17,100	10 August 1957
Hawthorn	14.19 (103)	Geelong	8.7 (55)	Glenferrie Oval	12,000	10 August 1957
Fitzroy	8.14 (62)	Collingwood	8.13 (61)	Brunswick Street Oval	22,000	10 August 1957
Richmond	11.9 (75)	Carlton	7.9 (51)	Punt Road Oval	22,000	10 August 1957

=== Round 17 ===
Home team	Home team score	Away team	Away team score	Venue	Crowd	Date
Geelong	8.10 (58)	St Kilda	10.13 (73)	Kardinia Park	12,759	17 August 1957
Collingwood	13.14 (92)	North Melbourne	11.13 (79)	Victoria Park	20,310	17 August 1957
Carlton	11.13 (79)	Fitzroy	5.11 (41)	Princes Park	25,945	17 August 1957
South Melbourne	11.9 (75)	Melbourne	9.17 (71)	Lake Oval	18,100	17 August 1957
Richmond	13.11 (89)	Footscray	14.14 (98)	Punt Road Oval	19,000	17 August 1957
Hawthorn	13.7 (85)	Essendon	9.10 (64)	Glenferrie Oval	31,000	17 August 1957

=== Round 18 ===
Home team	Home team score	Away team	Away team score	Venue	Crowd	Date
North Melbourne	10.20 (80)	South Melbourne	17.11 (113)	Arden Street Oval	10,000	24 August 1957
Melbourne	18.12 (120)	Richmond	10.11 (71)	MCG	35,751	24 August 1957
Footscray	8.11 (59)	Hawthorn	7.15 (57)	Western Oval	25,436	24 August 1957
Fitzroy	15.14 (104)	Geelong	10.20 (80)	Brunswick Street Oval	10,000	24 August 1957
St Kilda	14.12 (96)	Collingwood	7.14 (56)	Junction Oval	29,300	24 August 1957
Essendon	17.21 (123)	Carlton	9.8 (62)	Windy Hill	35,000	24 August 1957

== Ladder ==
(P)	Premiers
	Qualified for finals

#	Team	P	W	L	D	PF	PA	%	Pts
1	Melbourne (P)	18	12	5	1	1567	1129	138.8	50
2	Essendon	18	11	7	0	1447	1223	118.3	44
3	Hawthorn	18	11	7	0	1321	1132	116.7	44
4	Carlton	18	11	7	0	1341	1348	99.5	44
5	Collingwood	18	9	8	1	1390	1366	101.8	38
6	Footscray	18	9	8	1	1263	1275	99.1	38
7	Richmond	18	9	9	0	1506	1604	93.9	36
8	North Melbourne	18	8	10	0	1404	1477	95.1	32
9	St Kilda	18	8	10	0	1318	1394	94.5	32
10	South Melbourne	18	7	11	0	1349	1519	88.8	28
11	Fitzroy	18	6	12	0	1355	1611	84.1	24
12	Geelong	18	5	12	1	1368	1551	88.2	22

Rules for classification: 1. premiership points; 2. percentage; 3. points for
Average score: 77.0
Source: AFL Tables

== Finals series ==
=== Semi-finals ===
Team	1 Qtr	2 Qtr	3 Qtr	Final
Hawthorn	5.3	7.6	9.7	10.11 (71)
Carlton	0.2	1.4	2.7	6.12 (48)
Attendance: 69,455

Team	1 Qtr	2 Qtr	3 Qtr	Final
Melbourne	2.4	2.6	6.15	8.19 (67)
Essendon	1.3	10.6	11.9	12.11 (83)
Attendance: 70,232

=== Preliminary final ===
Team	1 Qtr	2 Qtr	3 Qtr	Final
Melbourne	4.4	11.4	16.9	22.12 (144)
Hawthorn	1.4	4.8	9.9	11.10 (76)
Attendance: 74,090

=== Grand final ===
Team	1 Qtr	2 Qtr	3 Qtr	Final
Essendon	2.3	4.4	7.8	7.13 (55)
Melbourne	6.2	9.9	12.11	17.14 (116)
Attendance: 100,324

== Night Series Competition ==
The night series were held under the floodlights at Lake Oval, South Melbourne.

In all other years of the night competition (i.e., 1956–1971), only teams that had finished 5th to 12th on ladder at the end of the home-and-away season competed; i.e., teams which were not playing in any of the end of season finals matches.

In 1957, due to the perceived popularity of the competition's initial year (1956), all twelve VFL clubs played in the 1957 Night Series. The series was marred by bad weather, with two matches having to be abandoned. Only an average of 16,000 spectators attending each of the 11 matches that were played. In 1958, the competition reverted to the 1956 structure, where only teams finishing 5th to 12th on the ladder competed.

Final: South Melbourne 15.13 (103) defeated Geelong 8.4 (52)

== Season notes ==
- Following the successful introduction of televised sport in 1956, the VFL decides to allow the live broadcast of the last quarter of three VFL matches each Saturday afternoon. Experiments conducted in 1956 involving three "closed circuit" telecasts of three of the finals matches, and the live broadcast of the Olympic Games' demonstration match had shown that it was possible to from "wide-shots" to "close-ups" quickly enough to provide effective viewing. Each station's telecast had a principal commentator: Tony Charlton (HSV-7), Ken Dakin (ABV-2), and Ian Johnson (GTV-9).
- In Round 4, Richmond defeated Fitzroy by 15 points despite having fifteen fewer scoring shots. This remains the greatest deficit in scoring shots by a winning side, though equalled by Geelong against Collingwood in 1977.
- In August, learning from the success of the Olympic Games, and in an attempt to counter the problems of overnight queues outside the Melbourne Cricket Ground prior to each final, the VFL sold reserved tickets through the mail for the finals series. It was also anticipated that this would greatly assist country people, who could now book seats and accommodation well in advance.
- Hawthorn made the final four for the first time since their VFL debut in 1925, ending the longest finals drought in VFL/AFL history (thirty-two years and 595 matches).
- Allan Nash becomes the last umpire to officiate in all games of a finals series.

== Awards ==
- The 1957 VFL Premiership team was Melbourne.
- The VFL's leading goalkicker was Jack Collins of Footscray who kicked 74 goals.
- The winner of the 1957 Brownlow Medal was Brian Gleeson of St Kilda with 24 votes.
- The McClelland Trophy was won by Essendon, with 173 points. Minor premiers Melbourne finished second with 164.
- Geelong took the "wooden spoon" in 1957.
- The seconds premiership was won by North Melbourne. North Melbourne 14.13 (97) defeated Fitzroy 13.15 (93) in the Grand Final, held as a curtain raiser to the firsts Grand Final on 21 September.

== Sources ==
- 1957 VFL season at AFL Tables
- 1957 VFL season at Australian Football
