= 1956 VFL season =

60th season of the Victorian Football League (VFL)

1956 VFL premiership season
- Teams: 12
- Premiers: Melbourne; 8th premiership
- Minor premiers: Melbourne; 4th minor premiership
- Consolation series: South Melbourne; 1st Consolation series win
- Brownlow Medallist: Peter Box (Footscray)
- Coleman Medallist: Bill Young (St Kilda)
- Matches played: 112
- Highest: 115,902

The 1956 VFL season was the 60th season of the Victorian Football League (VFL), the highest level senior Australian rules football competition in Victoria. The season featured twelve clubs, ran from 14 April until 15 September, and comprised an 18-game home-and-away season followed by a finals series featuring the top four clubs.

The premiership was won by the Melbourne Football Club for the eighth time and second time consecutively, after it defeated Collingwood by 73 points in the 1956 VFL Grand Final.

== Background ==
From 22 November to 8 December, the 1956 Summer Olympics were to be held in Melbourne, with a re-configured Melbourne Cricket Ground as its Main Stadium.

The need to accommodate this fact brought certain changes to the 1956 VFL season:

- The 1956 Grand Final was brought forward to 15 September in order to allow sufficient time to prepare the M.C.G. for the Olympics.
- The season commenced early to accommodate a full eighteen rounds of home-and-away matches.
- Due to works to demolish the old Grandstand and the construct the new Northern (Olympic) Stand, Melbourne Cricket Ground would not be available to Melbourne for its home matches until Round 5.

It was not desirable for Melbourne to play four consecutive away matches to start the season. This was partly because Melbourne would then have four consecutive home matches between Rounds 12 and 15. Additionally, because of the proximity of the Melbourne Cricket Ground to Punt Road Oval, matches were never scheduled at the venues on the same day; so it would have forced Richmond to open the season with four home matches, then play four away matches from Rounds 12 to 15. To overcome this, Melbourne played only its first three matches away, then played its Round 4 home match against Fitzroy at Punt Road Oval.

In 1956, the VFL competition consisted of twelve teams of 18 on-the-field players each, plus two substitute players, known as the 19th man and the 20th man. A player could be substituted for any reason; however, once substituted, a player could not return to the field of play under any circumstances.

Teams played each other in a home-and-away season of 18 rounds; matches 12 to 18 were the "home-and-way reverse" of matches 1 to 7.

Once the 18 round home-and-away season had finished, the 1956 VFL Premiers were determined by the specific format and conventions of the Page–McIntyre system.

== Home-and-away season ==
=== Round 1 ===
| Home team | Home team score | Away team | Away team score | Venue | Crowd | Date |
|---|---|---|---|---|---|---|
| North Melbourne | 15.8 (98) | St Kilda | 5.11 (41) | Arden Street Oval | 11,000 | 14 April 1956 |
| Richmond | 8.7 (55) | Melbourne | 12.16 (88) | Punt Road Oval | 25,000 | 14 April 1956 |
| South Melbourne | 7.8 (50) | Geelong | 11.11 (77) | Lake Oval | 25,000 | 14 April 1956 |
| Footscray | 14.14 (98) | Fitzroy | 10.9 (69) | Western Oval | 26,617 | 14 April 1956 |
| Hawthorn | 8.17 (65) | Collingwood | 14.13 (97) | Glenferrie Oval | 24,000 | 14 April 1956 |
| Essendon | 9.13 (67) | Carlton | 5.9 (39) | Windy Hill | 30,000 | 14 April 1956 |

=== Round 2 ===
| Home team | Home team score | Away team | Away team score | Venue | Crowd | Date |
|---|---|---|---|---|---|---|
| Geelong | 16.14 (110) | North Melbourne | 2.10 (22) | Kardinia Park | 17,294 | 21 April 1956 |
| Collingwood | 12.18 (90) | South Melbourne | 7.11 (53) | Victoria Park | 24,800 | 21 April 1956 |
| Carlton | 6.11 (47) | Melbourne | 12.18 (90) | Princes Park | 18,656 | 21 April 1956 |
| Richmond | 12.13 (85) | Hawthorn | 16.10 (106) | Punt Road Oval | 16,000 | 21 April 1956 |
| St Kilda | 7.4 (46) | Footscray | 10.14 (74) | Junction Oval | 21,382 | 21 April 1956 |
| Fitzroy | 10.19 (79) | Essendon | 7.15 (57) | Brunswick Street Oval | 18,000 | 21 April 1956 |

=== Round 3 ===
| Home team | Home team score | Away team | Away team score | Venue | Crowd | Date |
|---|---|---|---|---|---|---|
| Footscray | 5.11 (41) | Melbourne | 9.13 (67) | Western Oval | 33,265 | 28 April 1956 |
| Fitzroy | 13.16 (94) | South Melbourne | 10.13 (73) | Brunswick Street Oval | 18,000 | 28 April 1956 |
| Hawthorn | 15.10 (100) | Geelong | 16.16 (112) | Glenferrie Oval | 20,000 | 28 April 1956 |
| North Melbourne | 9.11 (65) | Essendon | 15.17 (107) | Arden Street Oval | 15,000 | 28 April 1956 |
| Richmond | 17.12 (114) | Collingwood | 11.12 (78) | Punt Road Oval | 30,000 | 28 April 1956 |
| St Kilda | 9.11 (65) | Carlton | 13.9 (87) | Junction Oval | 26,400 | 28 April 1956 |

=== Round 4 ===
| Home team | Home team score | Away team | Away team score | Venue | Crowd | Date |
|---|---|---|---|---|---|---|
| Geelong | 15.13 (103) | Richmond | 10.11 (71) | Kardinia Park | 21,840 | 5 May 1956 |
| Essendon | 18.9 (117) | St Kilda | 9.23 (77) | Windy Hill | 16,000 | 5 May 1956 |
| Collingwood | 12.15 (87) | Footscray | 11.7 (73) | Victoria Park | 29,818 | 5 May 1956 |
| Carlton | 15.12 (102) | North Melbourne | 13.16 (94) | Princes Park | 17,447 | 5 May 1956 |
| South Melbourne | 6.17 (53) | Hawthorn | 8.11 (59) | Lake Oval | 18,500 | 5 May 1956 |
| Melbourne | 10.19 (79) | Fitzroy | 9.6 (60) | Punt Road Oval | 23,000 | 5 May 1956 |

=== Round 5 ===
| Home team | Home team score | Away team | Away team score | Venue | Crowd | Date |
|---|---|---|---|---|---|---|
| Footscray | 9.13 (67) | South Melbourne | 8.9 (57) | Western Oval | 18,134 | 12 May 1956 |
| Fitzroy | 8.15 (63) | North Melbourne | 7.6 (48) | Brunswick Street Oval | 9,000 | 12 May 1956 |
| Essendon | 6.22 (58) | Richmond | 7.10 (52) | Windy Hill | 17,000 | 12 May 1956 |
| Carlton | 8.16 (64) | Collingwood | 3.4 (22) | Princes Park | 24,000 | 12 May 1956 |
| St Kilda | 3.9 (27) | Hawthorn | 6.12 (48) | Junction Oval | 12,250 | 12 May 1956 |
| Melbourne | 6.20 (56) | Geelong | 6.12 (48) | MCG | 47,130 | 12 May 1956 |

=== Round 6 ===
| Home team | Home team score | Away team | Away team score | Venue | Crowd | Date |
|---|---|---|---|---|---|---|
| Fitzroy | 11.11 (77) | St Kilda | 7.11 (53) | Brunswick Street Oval | 11,500 | 19 May 1956 |
| Collingwood | 10.7 (67) | Geelong | 2.14 (26) | Victoria Park | 28,000 | 19 May 1956 |
| North Melbourne | 6.6 (42) | Melbourne | 11.18 (84) | Arden Street Oval | 11,000 | 19 May 1956 |
| Hawthorn | 10.14 (74) | Footscray | 10.11 (71) | Glenferrie Oval | 22,000 | 19 May 1956 |
| South Melbourne | 15.8 (98) | Essendon | 11.20 (86) | Lake Oval | 26,000 | 19 May 1956 |
| Richmond | 9.14 (68) | Carlton | 15.17 (107) | Punt Road Oval | 28,000 | 19 May 1956 |

=== Round 7 ===
| Home team | Home team score | Away team | Away team score | Venue | Crowd | Date |
|---|---|---|---|---|---|---|
| North Melbourne | 15.7 (97) | South Melbourne | 7.16 (58) | Arden Street Oval | 13,000 | 26 May 1956 |
| St Kilda | 9.10 (64) | Richmond | 6.8 (44) | Junction Oval | 15,800 | 26 May 1956 |
| Hawthorn | 8.10 (58) | Fitzroy | 9.13 (67) | Glenferrie Oval | 18,000 | 26 May 1956 |
| Geelong | 15.17 (107) | Essendon | 8.9 (57) | Kardinia Park | 21,758 | 26 May 1956 |
| Melbourne | 11.13 (79) | Collingwood | 9.7 (61) | MCG | 46,868 | 26 May 1956 |
| Footscray | 7.13 (55) | Carlton | 8.8 (56) | Western Oval | 33,089 | 26 May 1956 |

=== Round 8 ===
| Home team | Home team score | Away team | Away team score | Venue | Crowd | Date |
|---|---|---|---|---|---|---|
| Collingwood | 9.10 (64) | North Melbourne | 3.4 (22) | Victoria Park | 22,650 | 2 June 1956 |
| Carlton | 10.13 (73) | Hawthorn | 5.9 (39) | Princes Park | 33,557 | 2 June 1956 |
| St Kilda | 6.11 (47) | Melbourne | 9.7 (61) | Junction Oval | 26,300 | 2 June 1956 |
| Richmond | 10.15 (75) | South Melbourne | 12.6 (78) | Punt Road Oval | 23,000 | 4 June 1956 |
| Essendon | 12.11 (83) | Footscray | 14.23 (107) | Windy Hill | 31,500 | 4 June 1956 |
| Geelong | 11.12 (78) | Fitzroy | 8.8 (56) | Kardinia Park | 21,985 | 4 June 1956 |

=== Round 9 ===
| Home team | Home team score | Away team | Away team score | Venue | Crowd | Date |
|---|---|---|---|---|---|---|
| Hawthorn | 7.13 (55) | North Melbourne | 3.12 (30) | Glenferrie Oval | 11,000 | 9 June 1956 |
| Footscray | 12.14 (86) | Richmond | 6.8 (44) | Western Oval | 24,443 | 9 June 1956 |
| Carlton | 11.13 (79) | Geelong | 12.8 (80) | Princes Park | 33,254 | 9 June 1956 |
| South Melbourne | 14.5 (89) | St Kilda | 11.8 (74) | Lake Oval | 21,000 | 9 June 1956 |
| Melbourne | 15.17 (107) | Essendon | 4.15 (39) | MCG | 32,543 | 9 June 1956 |
| Fitzroy | 5.7 (37) | Collingwood | 12.10 (82) | Brunswick Street Oval | 24,000 | 9 June 1956 |

=== Round 10 ===
| Home team | Home team score | Away team | Away team score | Venue | Crowd | Date |
|---|---|---|---|---|---|---|
| North Melbourne | 10.13 (73) | Richmond | 12.11 (83) | Arden Street Oval | 11,000 | 16 June 1956 |
| Footscray | 13.12 (90) | Geelong | 10.8 (68) | Western Oval | 35,909 | 16 June 1956 |
| St Kilda | 9.9 (63) | Collingwood | 8.21 (69) | Junction Oval | 26,800 | 16 June 1956 |
| Melbourne | 12.10 (82) | South Melbourne | 8.11 (59) | MCG | 36,361 | 23 June 1956 |
| Essendon | 12.20 (92) | Hawthorn | 10.11 (71) | Windy Hill | 17,000 | 23 June 1956 |
| Fitzroy | 7.11 (53) | Carlton | 13.11 (89) | Brunswick Street Oval | 27,000 | 23 June 1956 |

=== Round 11 ===
| Home team | Home team score | Away team | Away team score | Venue | Crowd | Date |
|---|---|---|---|---|---|---|
| Hawthorn | 5.12 (42) | Melbourne | 11.14 (80) | Glenferrie Oval | 15,500 | 30 June 1956 |
| Geelong | 9.8 (62) | St Kilda | 8.9 (57) | Kardinia Park | 11,052 | 30 June 1956 |
| Collingwood | 15.18 (108) | Essendon | 7.12 (54) | Victoria Park | 23,814 | 30 June 1956 |
| North Melbourne | 5.9 (39) | Footscray | 6.13 (49) | Arden Street Oval | 14,000 | 30 June 1956 |
| Richmond | 15.12 (102) | Fitzroy | 12.14 (86) | Punt Road Oval | 12,000 | 30 June 1956 |
| South Melbourne | 9.19 (73) | Carlton | 7.12 (54) | Lake Oval | 27,000 | 30 June 1956 |

=== Round 12 ===
| Home team | Home team score | Away team | Away team score | Venue | Crowd | Date |
|---|---|---|---|---|---|---|
| Melbourne | 11.13 (79) | Richmond | 7.3 (45) | MCG | 26,772 | 7 July 1956 |
| Geelong | 10.7 (67) | South Melbourne | 3.8 (26) | Kardinia Park | 16,439 | 7 July 1956 |
| Fitzroy | 7.9 (51) | Footscray | 9.7 (61) | Brunswick Street Oval | 17,500 | 7 July 1956 |
| Collingwood | 11.18 (84) | Hawthorn | 8.10 (58) | Victoria Park | 17,150 | 7 July 1956 |
| Carlton | 12.13 (85) | Essendon | 5.15 (45) | Princes Park | 23,154 | 7 July 1956 |
| St Kilda | 20.9 (129) | North Melbourne | 7.9 (51) | Junction Oval | 14,600 | 7 July 1956 |

=== Round 13 ===
| Home team | Home team score | Away team | Away team score | Venue | Crowd | Date |
|---|---|---|---|---|---|---|
| Hawthorn | 3.13 (31) | Richmond | 8.6 (54) | Glenferrie Oval | 13,000 | 14 July 1956 |
| Footscray | 11.13 (79) | St Kilda | 13.2 (80) | Western Oval | 25,414 | 14 July 1956 |
| Essendon | 9.13 (67) | Fitzroy | 8.10 (58) | Windy Hill | 14,000 | 14 July 1956 |
| North Melbourne | 7.5 (47) | Geelong | 19.15 (129) | Arden Street Oval | 9,000 | 14 July 1956 |
| South Melbourne | 10.9 (69) | Collingwood | 11.9 (75) | Lake Oval | 25,000 | 14 July 1956 |
| Melbourne | 14.10 (94) | Carlton | 12.7 (79) | MCG | 46,022 | 14 July 1956 |

=== Round 14 ===
| Home team | Home team score | Away team | Away team score | Venue | Crowd | Date |
|---|---|---|---|---|---|---|
| Geelong | 12.13 (85) | Hawthorn | 10.14 (74) | Kardinia Park | 13,373 | 21 July 1956 |
| Essendon | 10.18 (78) | North Melbourne | 6.11 (47) | Windy Hill | 12,800 | 21 July 1956 |
| Collingwood | 14.16 (100) | Richmond | 8.5 (53) | Victoria Park | 21,422 | 21 July 1956 |
| Carlton | 8.18 (66) | St Kilda | 9.12 (66) | Princes Park | 30,100 | 21 July 1956 |
| Melbourne | 7.17 (59) | Footscray | 10.12 (72) | MCG | 47,956 | 21 July 1956 |
| South Melbourne | 11.15 (81) | Fitzroy | 15.15 (105) | Lake Oval | 15,000 | 21 July 1956 |

=== Round 15 ===
| Home team | Home team score | Away team | Away team score | Venue | Crowd | Date |
|---|---|---|---|---|---|---|
| Hawthorn | 10.18 (78) | South Melbourne | 12.6 (78) | Glenferrie Oval | 12,500 | 28 July 1956 |
| Fitzroy | 7.11 (53) | Melbourne | 11.15 (81) | Brunswick Street Oval | 13,000 | 28 July 1956 |
| Richmond | 9.11 (65) | Geelong | 11.13 (79) | Punt Road Oval | 15,000 | 28 July 1956 |
| St Kilda | 6.11 (47) | Essendon | 7.7 (49) | Junction Oval | 28,100 | 28 July 1956 |
| Footscray | 11.6 (72) | Collingwood | 14.20 (104) | Western Oval | 41,639 | 28 July 1956 |
| North Melbourne | 4.8 (32) | Carlton | 11.16 (82) | Arden Street Oval | 13,000 | 28 July 1956 |

=== Round 16 ===
| Home team | Home team score | Away team | Away team score | Venue | Crowd | Date |
|---|---|---|---|---|---|---|
| Hawthorn | 15.8 (98) | St Kilda | 12.9 (81) | Glenferrie Oval | 15,000 | 4 August 1956 |
| Geelong | 8.10 (58) | Melbourne | 8.8 (56) | Kardinia Park | 29,687 | 4 August 1956 |
| South Melbourne | 10.10 (70) | Footscray | 8.15 (63) | Lake Oval | 26,000 | 4 August 1956 |
| North Melbourne | 14.21 (105) | Fitzroy | 8.8 (56) | Arden Street Oval | 8,500 | 4 August 1956 |
| Richmond | 13.13 (91) | Essendon | 11.13 (79) | Punt Road Oval | 18,500 | 4 August 1956 |
| Collingwood | 9.17 (71) | Carlton | 12.12 (84) | Victoria Park | 38,679 | 4 August 1956 |

=== Round 17 ===
| Home team | Home team score | Away team | Away team score | Venue | Crowd | Date |
|---|---|---|---|---|---|---|
| Melbourne | 16.18 (114) | North Melbourne | 11.5 (71) | MCG | 16,186 | 11 August 1956 |
| Footscray | 15.13 (103) | Hawthorn | 9.6 (60) | Western Oval | 16,492 | 11 August 1956 |
| Essendon | 11.10 (76) | South Melbourne | 7.16 (58) | Windy Hill | 13,000 | 11 August 1956 |
| Carlton | 7.24 (66) | Richmond | 10.11 (71) | Princes Park | 22,500 | 11 August 1956 |
| St Kilda | 6.7 (43) | Fitzroy | 8.8 (56) | Junction Oval | 14,200 | 11 August 1956 |
| Geelong | 10.9 (69) | Collingwood | 15.11 (101) | Kardinia Park | 32,155 | 11 August 1956 |

=== Round 18 ===
| Home team | Home team score | Away team | Away team score | Venue | Crowd | Date |
|---|---|---|---|---|---|---|
| Richmond | 16.9 (105) | St Kilda | 16.14 (110) | Punt Road Oval | 15,000 | 18 August 1956 |
| Fitzroy | 9.16 (70) | Hawthorn | 10.17 (77) | Brunswick Street Oval | 7,500 | 18 August 1956 |
| Essendon | 14.13 (97) | Geelong | 9.15 (69) | Windy Hill | 16,500 | 18 August 1956 |
| Collingwood | 9.6 (60) | Melbourne | 10.13 (73) | Victoria Park | 31,089 | 18 August 1956 |
| Carlton | 6.9 (45) | Footscray | 8.14 (62) | Princes Park | 44,878 | 18 August 1956 |
| South Melbourne | 13.9 (87) | North Melbourne | 7.13 (55) | Lake Oval | 10,000 | 18 August 1956 |

== Ladder ==
| (P) | Premiers |
| | Qualified for finals |

| # | Team | P | W | L | D | PF | PA | % | Pts |
|---|---|---|---|---|---|---|---|---|---|
| 1 | Melbourne (P) | 18 | 16 | 2 | 0 | 1429 | 979 | 146.0 | 64 |
| 2 | Collingwood | 18 | 13 | 5 | 0 | 1420 | 1128 | 125.9 | 52 |
| 3 | Geelong | 18 | 13 | 5 | 0 | 1427 | 1171 | 121.9 | 52 |
| 4 | Footscray | 18 | 11 | 7 | 0 | 1323 | 1159 | 114.2 | 44 |
| 5 | Carlton | 18 | 10 | 7 | 1 | 1304 | 1147 | 113.7 | 42 |
| 6 | Essendon | 18 | 10 | 8 | 0 | 1308 | 1365 | 95.8 | 40 |
| 7 | Hawthorn | 18 | 7 | 10 | 1 | 1193 | 1342 | 88.9 | 30 |
| 8 | Fitzroy | 18 | 7 | 11 | 0 | 1190 | 1332 | 89.3 | 28 |
| 9 | South Melbourne | 18 | 6 | 11 | 1 | 1210 | 1374 | 88.1 | 26 |
| 10 | Richmond | 18 | 6 | 12 | 0 | 1277 | 1471 | 86.8 | 24 |
| 11 | St Kilda | 18 | 4 | 13 | 1 | 1170 | 1330 | 88.0 | 18 |
| 12 | North Melbourne | 18 | 3 | 15 | 0 | 1038 | 1491 | 69.6 | 12 |

Rules for classification: 1. premiership points; 2. percentage; 3. points for
Average score: 70.8
Source: AFL Tables

== Finals series ==
=== Semi-finals ===
| Team | 1 Qtr | 2 Qtr | 3 Qtr | Final |
|---|---|---|---|---|
| Geelong | 4.2 | 6.2 | 6.4 | 6.5 (41) |
| Footscray | 1.3 | 4.6 | 5.8 | 5.13 (43) |
Attendance: 79,402

| Team | 1 Qtr | 2 Qtr | 3 Qtr | Final |
|---|---|---|---|---|
| Melbourne | 1.4 | 3.6 | 8.9 | 11.14 (80) |
| Collingwood | 1.4 | 3.7 | 8.10 | 8.16 (64) |
Attendance: 91,480

=== Preliminary final ===
| Team | 1 Qtr | 2 Qtr | 3 Qtr | Final |
|---|---|---|---|---|
| Collingwood | 6.1 | 6.1 | 11.5 | 15.6 (96) |
| Footscray | 3.0 | 5.8 | 6.9 | 7.15 (57) |
Attendance: 94,104

=== Grand final ===
| Team | 1 Qtr | 2 Qtr | 3 Qtr | Final |
|---|---|---|---|---|
| Melbourne | 2.4 | 6.11 | 10.16 | 17.19 (121) |
| Collingwood | 3.3 | 4.3 | 5.6 | 6.12 (48) |
Attendance: 115,902

== Consolation Night Series Competition ==
The first VFL night series was held under floodlights at Lake Oval, South Melbourne amongst those teams who had missed the regular final series. The eight teams that had finished in places 5 to 12 on the end-of-season ladder played in a set of seven elimination matches at the end of the home-and-away season.

The Final was played on the evening of Monday 17 September 1956 (two days after the VFL Grand Final) in front of 33,120 spectators. South Melbourne 13.16 (94) defeated Carlton 13.10 (78).

== Season notes ==
- The VFL introduced a "Night Premiership", played between teams that finished outside the final four. The seven elimination matches were played under lights at the Lake Oval. The matches were renowned for their violence both on and off the field. In 1956, licensed venues in Melbourne closed at six o' clock, so the matches provided patrons a location to have a drink after six o'clock; this made these matches very attractive, and the seven matches were attended by an average of 20,000+ patrons. The lighting was dim by modern standards, and it meant that most of the spectators could not always clearly see what was happening on the other side of the ground. On occasion the fights amongst the spectators were so fierce that the players stopped to watch. There was also much violence on the field, with players soon learning that keeping to the well-lit parts of the ground offered considerable protection.
- In winning the Grand Final, Melbourne created a record by having defeated the same opponent (Collingwood) four times in a single senior VFL season.
- The official Grand Final attendance of 115,802 (based on gate entrance sales) broke VFL records. The record crowd was largely due to the opening of the Melbourne Cricket Ground's new grandstand, but public interest was also high as a close, hard-fought game was expected. The ground was so packed that spectators sat between the fence and the boundary line. The gates were closed for safety. During the third quarter the crowd milling outside the MCG broke a perimeter fence and more people poured into the MCG. From the following year (in 1957), ticket sales were first used for the final series to prevent overcrowding.
- The VFL inaugurated a public Brownlow Medal presentation ceremony to be held at the First Semi-Final.
- Essendon Third Eighteen footballer and junior champion athlete Ron Clarke, son of 1931 Essendon Best and Fairest Tom Clarke, and brother of Essendon champion Jack Clarke, lit the Olympic Flame in the 1956 Olympics' opening ceremony.
- Australian rules football was a demonstration sport at the 1956 Olympics: on Friday 7 December 1956, as a curtain raiser to the soccer match to decide third and fourth places between Bulgaria and India at the Melbourne Cricket Ground, a combined team of amateur players from the VFA and VFL played a demonstration match of Australian rules football against a team of Victorian Amateur Football Association players in front of an audience of 21,236.

== Awards ==
- The 1956 VFL Seniors Premiership team was Melbourne.
- The 1956 VFL Reserves Premiership team was Melbourne.
- The 1956 VFL Under 19s Premiership team was South Melbourne.
- The VFL's leading goalkicker was Bill Young of St Kilda who kicked 56 goals (in 16 games).
- The winner of the 1956 Brownlow Medal was Peter Box of Footscray with 22 votes.
- North Melbourne took the "wooden spoon" in 1956.

== See also ==
- Australian football at the 1956 Summer Olympics

== Sources ==
- 1956 VFL season at AFL Tables
- 1956 VFL season at Australian Football
