= 1960 VFL grand final =

Grand final of the 1960 Victorian Football League season

1960 VFL Grand Final

Melbourne	Collingwood
8.14 (62)	2.2 (14)
	1	2	3	4
MEL	4.3 (27)	5.5 (35)	7.12 (54)	8.14 (62)
COL	0.0 (0)	1.0 (6)	2.0 (12)	2.2 (14)
- Date: 24 September 1960
- Stadium: Melbourne Cricket Ground
- Attendance: 97,457

The 1960 VFL Grand Final was an Australian rules football game contested between the Melbourne Football Club and Collingwood Football Club, held at the Melbourne Cricket Ground in Melbourne on 24 September 1960 in extremely wet conditions due to persistent rain during the previous week. It was the 63rd annual Grand Final of the Victorian Football League, staged to determine the premiers for the 1960 VFL season. The match, attended despite the conditions by 97,457 spectators, was won by Melbourne by a margin of 48 points, marking that club's 11th premiership victory.

Collingwood's score stands as the lowest it has kicked since round 6, 1900, and its sixth-lowest ever. Their four scoring shots is the second-lowest by any team since round 12, 1908 (the lowest being Fitzroy in round 5, 1953). Even the two goals the Magpies did score were regarded as very lucky. One was from a long kick that just made the distance, and the other was after an easy mark by Melbourne full back Tassie Johnson was dropped in the goal square.

This was Melbourne's seventh premiership appearance in successive seasons, having won all these contests except the 1954 VFL Grand Final and 1958 VFL Grand Final.

== Teams ==
Melbourne	Collingwood

Melbourne
B:	30 John Beckwith	8 Tassie Johnson	14 Trevor Johnson
HB:	7 Geoff Case	4 John Lord	26 Ian Thorogood
C:	9 Brian Dixon	11 Laurie Mithen	22 Bryan Kenneally
HF:	23 Geoff Tunbridge	35 Clyde Laidlaw	29 Hassa Mann
F:	16 Bob Johnson	2 Alan Rowarth	6 Frank 'Bluey' Adams
Foll:	34 Len Mann	31 Ron Barassi (c)	24 Ian Ridley
Res:	21 Brian Leahy	38 Ray Nilsson	
Coach:	Norm Smith		

Collingwood
B:	16 Ron Reeves	27 Peter Rosenbrock	25 Mick Twomey
HB:	29 Kevin Rose	21 Bill Thripp	5 Mike Delanty
C:	4 Brian Gray	10 John Henderson	12 Errol Hutchesson
HF:	11 Ken Turner	1 Murray Weideman (c)	20 Brian Beers
F:	28 Graeme Fellowes	8 Ray Willett	19 Keith Burns
Foll:	13 Ray Gabelich	32 Barry Harrison	30 Ron O'Dwyer
Res:	6 Ian Brewer	37 Bert Chapman	
Coach:	Phonse Kyne		

- Umpire: Jack Irving

== Scoreboard ==
Team	1	2	3	Final
Melbourne	4.3	5.5	7.12	8.14 (62)
Collingwood	0.0	1.0	2.0	2.2 (14)

== Statistics ==
=== Goalkickers ===
Melbourne:

- F Adams 2
- B Johnson 2
- H Mann 2
- A Rowarth 1
- G Tunbridge 1

Collingwood:

- R Gabelich 1
- J Henderson 1

== See also ==
- 1960 VFL season
