= Ray Gabelich =

Australian rules footballer

Personal information
- Born: 3 July 1933; Perth, Western Australia
- Died: 18 July 2000 (aged 67); Melbourne, Victoria, Australia
- Original teams: Mt Hawthorn, Metropolitan Junior Football Association (Perth)
- Height: 193 cm (6 ft 4 in)
- Weight: 111 kg (245 lb)
- Position: centre half-forward/ruck

Playing career^{1}
Years	Club	Games (Goals)
1955–1960	Collingwood	87 (16)
1961	West Perth	18 (?)
1962–1966	Collingwood	73 (27)
Total		178 (43)
- ^{1} Playing statistics correct to the end of 1966.

Career highlights
- Collingwood Premiership side 1958; VFL/VFA Team (Melbourne Olympic Games demonstration match): 1956; Copeland Trophy Winner: 1960; 3rd Brownlow medal: 1959; West Australian State team (ANFC Carnival): 1961; All-Australian team: 1961; Simpson Medalist: 1961; Life Membership: Collingwood Football Club 1966

Raymond Thomas Gabelich (3 July 1933 – 18 July 2000) was an Australian rules footballer who played with Collingwood in the Victorian Football League (VFL).

== Family ==
The son of John (1902–1988) and Elizabeth Nina "Bessie" Gabelich, née Rerecich (1910–2006), Raymond Thomas Gabelich was born in Perth on 3 July 1933.

He married Glenda Beverley Huxtable on 5 September 1960; they had three children: Lisa, Raymond and Matthew.

== Amateur football ==
Prevented by East Perth from playing for West Perth on supposed residential grounds, Gabelich was unable to play first-grade football in Perth.

=== Mount Hawthorn (MJFA) ===
Frustrated, he continued to play top-level, under-20s, amateur football for the Mt Hawthorn Amateur Football Club in Perth's Metropolitan Junior Football Association competition. He was the team's captain in 1953, and he was selected in a West Australian representative team to play in Melbourne. He lodged numerous unsuccessful appeals against his prohibition from playing for West Perth.

=== Parkside (VAFA) ===
Gabelich, then aged 18, first came to Collingwood’s attention when he was one of the best players afield for the Mt. Hawthorn team that beat South Fremantle Ex-Scholars team (each were premiers in their respective amateur competitions that year) on 20 October 1951, in the curtain raiser for the match in which the visiting Collingwood team lost 22.9 (141) to South Fremantle 15.12 (102).

He came to Collingwood from Western Australia as a centre half-forward in 1954 too late to be listed; and, so, he continued to play football with Parkside Amateurs, a team that was coached by ex-Preston (VFA) rover Les Ross, in the Victorian Amateur Football Association, for the remainder of the 1954: a season in which Parkside were C-Grade premiers, unbeaten throughout the entire season. Gabelich played at centre half-back in the Grand Final where Parkside 15.19 (109) defeated Old Xaverians 8.12 (60).

The team also won the VAFA Lightning Premiership conducted on the Queen's Birthday weekend as a prelude to the Interstate match between the Victorian and South Australian Amateur representative teams.

The only loss the team experienced in 1954 — in fact, the team had won 29 matches consecutively over two (1953/1954) seasons — was when it was defeated, 10.6 (66) to 4.11 (35), by the 1954 Canberra Australian National Football League premiers, Queanbeyan-Acton, in a post–Grand Final match in Canberra on 19 September 1954. Gabelich, at centre half-back, was one of Parkside's best players.

He also played for a Collingwood team, against South Fremantle, in July 1954.

== Injury ==
When working as a fitter and turner in Melbourne, he lost the top of his middle finger in an industrial accident in 1955 before he had played his first game for Collingwood.

== Debut for Collingwood ==
Granted a permit to play with Collingwood in March 1955, Gabelich made his debut for Collingwood in the 30 April 1955 (round three) match against St Kilda — one commentator's view of his performance: "Gabelich: Nice mark and kick. Promising, except for ground play" — he replaced an injured Murray Weideman at centre half-forward in the selected team; he scored 1.4 (10) (playing against Neil Roberts). Gabelich also played (in the ruck) for Collingwood in its end-of-season match against Perth Football Club, who had won the 1955 West Australian Football League premiership team on the previous Saturday, in Perth, on 15 October 1955. He was described as "a superb athlete … deceptively quick and athletic for a man of his massive dimensions",

Gabelich only played seven games in 1957. In the third quarter of the (round 6) match against North Melbourne on 25 May 1957, Gabelich was kicked in the lower leg and sustained a broken fibula. Rejecting the offer of a stretcher, Gabelich "walked unaided more than half the length of the ground" to the dressing room, where "[having been] asked in the dressing room how he knew the leg was broken Gabelich shocked the club doctor by inviting him to listen to the bones grate".

Gabelich's first post-injury appearance was for Collingwood's Second XVIII, playing against North Melbourne on 17 August 1957, where "until his condition gave out, [he] did well and was not troubled by his leg". He was selected in the First XVIII for the important (round 18) last match of the season against St Kilda on 24 August 1957, and was one of Collingwood's best players in a losing team.

In his eleven-season, 160-game career with Collingwood, he played in 17 finals matches, including 5 Grand Finals. In 1958, when Collingwood won the Grand Final, defeating Melbourne 12.10 (82) to 9.10 (64) — and, in the process, preventing Melbourne from matching Collingwood's record of winning four premierships in a row (viz., 1927, 1928, 1920, and 1930) — Gabelich played a strong robust game as a back-pocket ruckman; and, "with his terrific strength [and taking] control of the packs", Gabelich was instrumental in Collingwood turning a 17-point deficit at quarter-time into a two-point lead at half-time, and a 33-point lead at three-quarter time.

He was runner-up in the 1959 Brownlow to St Kilda's Verdun Howell and South Melbourne's Bob Skilton (who had tied for first), and he won the Copeland Trophy as Collingwood's best and fairest in 1960.

== Olympic Games ==
He played as a back-pocket resting ruckman for the combined VFL and VFA team against the VAFA in the demonstration match of Australian rules football, during the Melbourne Olympic Games, on 7 December 1956.

== Darwin ==
At the end of the 1959 season, Gabelich, unemployed, and surviving only on his (at the time meagre) football payments from Collingwood, sought a clearance to West Perth—where, in addition to his football payments, he had been promised "a full directorship of an estate agency which would guarantee him a minimum income of £4,000 a year" (A$124,016 in 2020 terms)—and had been told, by Collingwood, that no decision could be made until a new, 1960, committee had been elected. A frustrated Gabelich flew to Darwin on Friday, 8 January 1960, played with the Waratah Football Club on the Saturday, and on the following Monday commenced work as a storeman in a hardware store to the bewilderment of West Perth officials.

On the following Saturday (16 January) morning, Gabelich contacted the Collingwood secretary (Gordon Carlyon) and, having received an assurance from Carlyon that Collingwood would support his request to the VFL to be allowed to play for the Waratah Football Club in the Victorian off-season, he agreed to not play on that Saturday, in the hope that would not further prejudice his request. After a discussion that concluded that "follower Ray Gabelich has not broken any A.N.F.C.regulation, or incurred automatic disqualification by playing in Darwin", Collingwood decided to refer the matter to the VFL for guidance, before making a final decision.

Despite Collingwood's argument that Gabelich's actions did not warrant automatic disqualification, because (a) "Darwin was not a State", and (b) "Gabelich had played out of [Victorian] season", the VFL — taking the view that Gabelich's decision to play in Darwin was "an embarrassment" — decided to seek advice from the Australian National Football Council before making any decision.

In March 1960, Having played a number of games in Darwin, Gabelich decided to temporarily abandon his plans to play with West Perth, and chose to play another season with Collingwood.

== Return to Western Australia ==
In 1961 he returned to Western Australia where spent the entire season playing with West Perth, during which time he also represented Western Australia at the 1961 Brisbane Australian National Football Council Carnival, playing at centre-half back (and, in the process, he completely nullified South Melbourne's champion centre half-forward Jim Taylor) in the West Australian team that not only (unexpectedly) defeated the Victorian representative team 15.14 (104) to 14.11 (95) in "a fiercely fought match", but also, through that victory, won the ANFC Carnival title.

His outstanding performance for West Australia resulted in his selection, at centre half-back in that year's All-Australian team, but also the award of the Simpson Medal as the best West Australian player at the Brisbane Carnival.

== Return to Collingwood ==
Now aged 28, Gabelich returned to Collingwood in 1962, and he captained the club for the entire 1964 season and part of 1965.

Although injured and unable to play in the first two matches of the season, Gabelich starred in his first return match on 5 May 1962 (round 3) against South Melbourne, which Collingwood won 15.10 (100) to 7.14(56):

[The] inclusion of Ray Gabelich to add strength and drive to the rucks, and give aid to high marking around the ground, made a tremendous difference to Collingwood. Other players picked up confidence from Gabelich and the Magpies finished with very few unprofitable spots. Besides picking up in ruck power, the Magpies gained a sharper and more penetrating edge around the packs.

In 1965, an overweight Gabelich's pre-season training was greatly affected by (a) his having undergone a major operation on his nose in early February, (b) his having undergone a minor ear operation in early March, and, also, (c) having an emergency admission to hospital on 16 March. In the early hours of 17 March 1965, he was operated on, and his appendix was removed. The medical advice given to Collingwood at the time was that Gabelich would be unable to begin training (let alone playing) until after round 2, on 24 April.

His robust constitution was such that he played in the Collingwood Second XVIII on 24 April 1965. Although there was some doubt earlier in the week, Gabelich played his first senior game for 1965 against Hawthorn in round 3, on 1 May 1965.

== 1964 Grand Final ==
Gabelich is perhaps best known to those who never saw him play for the often-shown television footage of the remarkable goal he scored in the dying minutes of the 1964 Grand Final.

With five minutes to go, the ball had been passed to Gabelich by Des Tuddenham.

Gabelich, Collingwood's team captain, then ran awkwardly towards the Collingwood goal, struggling to control the ball, and bouncing the ball four times in a run of, at least fifty yards and, then, kicking a goal that put Collingwood in front — with a close range kick that almost went out of the ground: The Collingwood Player Archive: Ray Gabelich: 7:16 onwards on YouTube.

However, Gabelich's goal did not win the match. A minute later, Melbourne defender Neil Crompton kicked a goal, putting Melbourne in front by four points. Collingwood were unable to score again.

== 1966 Grand Final ==
Gabelich's last match for Collingwood (aged 33) was in the team that lost the 1966 VFL Grand Final to St Kilda by one point. He kicked two goals, one behind, and was one of Collingwood's best players:

What a useless task it is trying to use brute strength to halt the passage of 17 st. 4 lb. [110kg] Collingwood follower Ray Gabelich. Three St. Kilda players realised this early in the second quarter when they tried to drag "Gabbo" down in the goal square as he moved towards goal. Gabelich shrugged them off and calmly snapped the ball through for full points. It was his second goal.

== Tribunal ==
Gabelich was reported twice in his 160-game, 13-season career with Collingwood.

=== 1960 ===
The first was in a "fiery match" against South Melbourne on 20 August 1960 (round 17), when he was charged with striking South Melbourne’s Ken Boyd in the face with a closed fist during a contest for the ball at a ball-up during the third quarter.

Defended by barrister, ex-Collingwood footballer, and Collingwood committeeman Frank Galbally, Gabelich produced five witnesses: (a) Gabelich himself; (b) Collingwood player (Ken Turner), (c) "Mr. L. Smith", a Collingwood supporter, who had served 31 years in the police force, (d) ex-Melbourne footballer and 3AW football commentator Doug Heywood, and (e) Len Herath, "a former football umpire and president of the Umpires Association of Mildura".

The evidence presented to the VFL Tribunal (with Boyd present, displaying a badly injured nose) claimed that (a) despite the muddy condition of the ground surface at Victoria Park, rather than throwing the ball in the air, the umpire had chosen to bounce it, (b) the umpire had not bounced the ball well on what was a very muddy surface at Victoria Park (the ball went low and veered to the side), (c) Gabelich had definitely struck directly at the ball and missed (i.e., rather than intentionally punching Boyd), (d) when rucking, Gabelich consistently punched the ball and never palmed it (thus, his use of a fist did not suggest any intention of punching Boyd).

While the tribunal concluded that "the only thing we can be certain of is that Boyd was struck on the nose", it also declared that "we cannot be satisfied that Gabelich deliberately struck Boyd"; and, as a consequence, the tribunal dismissed the charge against Gabelich.

=== 1962 ===
The second was in the 23 June 1962 (round 9) game against Fitzroy, when Gabelich was charged with striking Fitzroy's Ron Harvey in the second quarter of the match.

Although it seems transparently clear from the evidence given to the tribunal that Gabelich was retaliating to an assault by Harvey, none of the officials in control of the game had seen any such activity from Harvey. Given that fact, and from the evidence presented from the field umpire (Jim Brewer), it was obvious that regardless of whatever it was had preceded the incident, Gabelich had, indeed, struck Harvey. The tribunal took just three minutes to find Gabelich guilty and suspended him for two matches.

Although, with Gabelich missing, and only winning one out of every three ruck contests, Collingwood won its next match without Gabelich: (round 10) (Collingwood 14.16 (100) to Richmond 13.10 (88)).

Collingwood, still without Gabelich, and despite being five points ahead at three-quarter time, faded in the last quarter and lost the strongly contested next match, (round 11) against Essendon, the eventual 1962 premiers (Collingwood 11.11 (77) to Essendon 13.16 (94)). In the view of many, Collingwood may well have won the match had Gabelich been playing in support of his regular Collingwood teammate, ruckman Neville Withers:

[In this afternoon's match] Essendon should initiate more moves from the rucks than Collingwood. [With Gabelich missing from their lineup] the Magpies have no one to clamp down on Geoff Leek, who has the support of Hugh Mitchell, Don McKenzie, and Ken Timms. Their work [in the ruck] should be topped off by [rover] Jack Clarke, one of the most effective players in the game. (Percy Beames, The Age, 7 July 1962).

== Death ==
He died in Melbourne on 18 July 2000.

== See also ==
- Australian football at the 1956 Summer Olympics
- 1958 Melbourne Carnival
- 1961 Brisbane Carnival
