= 1959 Brownlow Medal =

- Winner: Bob Skilton (South Melbourne); Verdun Howell (St Kilda); 20 votes

Television/radio coverage
- Network: Seven Network

The 1959 Brownlow Medal was the 32nd year the award was presented to the player adjudged the fairest and best player during the Victorian Football League (VFL) home and away season. Bob Skilton of the South Melbourne Football Club and Verdun Howell of the St Kilda Football Club both won the medal by polling twenty votes during the 1959 VFL season.

Under the tie-breaker rules in place in 1959, Skilton was originally the outright winner: he and Howell were tied on 20 votes, but Skilton polled five 3-vote games to Howell's three. In 1980, the League removed the tie-break from the rules and allowed for multiple tied winners in the same year; and in 1989 it retrospectively removed the tie-breaker from all previous counts, elevating Howell to joint winner of the 1959 medal.

== Leading votegetters ==
	Player	Votes
=1st	Bob Skilton (South Melbourne)	20
=1st	Verdun Howell (St Kilda)	20
=3rd	Ray Gabelich (Collingwood)	14
=3rd	Bill Serong (Collingwood)	14
=3rd	Hugh Mitchell (Essendon)	14
=3rd	Ted Whitten (Footscray)	14
=7th	Thorold Merrett (Collingwood)	12
=7th	Ron Hovey (Geelong)	12
	Graham Donaldson (Carlton)*	11
=10th	Bob Johnson (Melbourne)	10
=10th	Brian McGowan (South Melbourne)	10

* The player was ineligible to win the medal due to suspension by the VFL Tribunal during the year.
