= John Lord (footballer, born 1937) =

Australian rules footballer (1937–2021)

Personal information
- Born: 2 April 1937
- Died: 30 July 2021 (aged 84)
- Original teams: Echuca (Bendigo FL), Lismore (Vic)
- Height: 188 cm (6 ft 2 in)
- Weight: 93 kg (205 lb)

Playing career^{1}
Years	Club	Games (Goals)
1957–1965	Melbourne	132 (80)
- ^{1} Playing statistics correct to the end of 1965.

Career highlights
- VFL premiership player: 1957, 1959, 1960, 1964

John Lord (2 April 1937 – 30 July 2021) was an Australian rules footballer who played with Melbourne in the Victorian Football League (VFL). Although he played his early football in Echuca he was recruited from the Lismore Football Club on the Western Plains of Victoria where he was stationed with Elders Smith, now Elders Limited.

A strong mark, Lord was used by coach Norm Smith in both defence and attack. He played most of his early football in the backline and was a Melbourne premiership player in 1957, 1959 and 1960. He was widely considered the best on ground in the 1960 VFL grand final, with his dominance at centre half back against tough Collingwood forward Murray Weidemann being a major contributing factor to his team holding Collingwood to only four scoring shots and a score of 2.2 (14) for the match. In the 1964 VFL grand final, he kicked two goals from the forward pocket to help his side to victory again Collingwood and win his fourth premiership.

== Statistics ==
Legend
G	Goals	K	Kicks	D	Disposals	T	Tackles
B	Behinds	H	Handballs	M	Marks
#	Played in that season's premiership team

Season	Team	No.	Games	Totals							Averages (per game)							Votes
Season	Team	No.	Games	G	B	K	H	D	M	T	G	B	K	H	D	M	T	Votes
1957^{#}	Melbourne	4	14	0	—N/a	—N/a	—N/a	—N/a	—N/a	—N/a	0.0	—N/a	—N/a	—N/a	—N/a	—N/a	—N/a	0
1958	Melbourne	4	11	1	—N/a	—N/a	—N/a	—N/a	—N/a	—N/a	0.1	—N/a	—N/a	—N/a	—N/a	—N/a	—N/a	3
1959^{#}	Melbourne	4	8	0	—N/a	—N/a	—N/a	—N/a	—N/a	—N/a	0.0	—N/a	—N/a	—N/a	—N/a	—N/a	—N/a	1
1960^{#}	Melbourne	4	20	4	—N/a	—N/a	—N/a	—N/a	—N/a	—N/a	0.2	—N/a	—N/a	—N/a	—N/a	—N/a	—N/a	4
1961	Melbourne	4	19	4	—N/a	—N/a	—N/a	—N/a	—N/a	—N/a	0.2	—N/a	—N/a	—N/a	—N/a	—N/a	—N/a	3
1962	Melbourne	4	18	16	—N/a	—N/a	—N/a	—N/a	—N/a	—N/a	0.9	—N/a	—N/a	—N/a	—N/a	—N/a	—N/a	5
1963	Melbourne	4	20	19	—N/a	—N/a	—N/a	—N/a	—N/a	—N/a	1.0	—N/a	—N/a	—N/a	—N/a	—N/a	—N/a	6
1964^{#}	Melbourne	4	8	14	—N/a	—N/a	—N/a	—N/a	—N/a	—N/a	1.8	—N/a	—N/a	—N/a	—N/a	—N/a	—N/a	0
1965	Melbourne	4	14	22	19	106	33	139	53	—N/a	1.6	1.4	7.6	2.4	9.9	3.8	—N/a	3
Career			132	80	19	106	33	139	53	—N/a	0.6	1.4	7.6	2.4	9.9	3.8	—N/a	25
