= Bert Chapman (disambiguation) =

Bert Chapman was a footballer.

Bert Chapman may also refer to:

- Bert Chapman (footballer, born 1891)

== See also ==
- Herbert Chapman, English footballer
- Hubert Chapman, RAF officer
- Albert Chapman (disambiguation)
- Robert Chapman (disambiguation)
