= Rosenbrock =

Rosenbrock is a surname. Notable people with the surname include:

- Eddie Rosenbrock (1908–1978), Australian rules footballer
- Howard Harry Rosenbrock (1920–2010), English control theorist and engineer
- Peter Rosenbrock (1939–2005), Australian rules footballer
