= 1965 Brownlow Medal =

- Winner: Noel Teasdale (North Melbourne); Ian Stewart (St Kilda); 20 votes

Television/radio coverage
- Network: Seven Network

The 1965 Brownlow Medal was the 38th year the award was presented to the player adjudged the fairest and best player during the Victorian Football League (VFL) home and away season. Noel Teasdale of the North Melbourne Football Club and Ian Stewart of the St Kilda Football Club both won the medal by polling twenty votes during the 1965 VFL season.

Under the tie-breaker rules in place in 1965, Stewart was originally the outright winner: he and Teasdale were tied on 20 votes, but Stewart polled six 3-vote games to Teasdale's five. In 1980, the League removed the tie-break from the rules and allowed for multiple tied winners in the same year; and in 1989 it retrospectively removed the tie-breaker from all previous counts, elevating Teasdale to joint winner of the 1965 medal.

== Leading votegetters ==
	Player	Votes
=1st	Noel Teasdale (North Melbourne)	20
=1st	Ian Stewart (St Kilda)	20
3rd	Darrel Baldock (St Kilda)	18
4th	Ken Fraser (Essendon)	16
5th	John Nicholls (Carlton)	15
=6th	Bill Barrot (Richmond)	14
=6th	Bob Skilton (South Melbourne)	14
8th	John Jillard (Footscray)	13
=9th	John Schultz (Footscray)	11
=9th	Graham Farmer (Geelong)	11
=9th	Alan Morrow (St Kilda)	11
