= Neil Crompton (footballer) =

Australian footballer and cricketer

Personal information
- Full name: Colin Neil Crompton
- Nickname: Froggie
- Born: 16 August 1937; Dandenong, Victoria
- Died: 11 December 2003 (aged 66)
- Original team: Ormond
- Height: 178 cm (5 ft 10 in)
- Weight: 79 kg (174 lb)
- Position: Back pocket

Playing career^{1}
Years	Club	Games (Goals)
1957-1960, 1962–1966	Melbourne	99 (24)
1961	Glenelg	18 (37)
Total		117 (61)
- ^{1} Playing statistics correct to the end of 1966.

Career highlights
- VFL premiership player: 1964

Colin Neil Crompton (16 August 1937 – 11 December 2003) was both a first class cricketer for Victoria and an Australian rules footballer who played for Melbourne in the Victorian Football League (VFL) in two stints (1957–1960 and 1962–1966), and for Glenelg in the South Australian National Football League (SANFL) in 1961.

Football

Crompton usually played in the back pocket and thus did not kick many goals however it is for a goal he kicked in Melbourne's 1964 grand final win over Collingwood that he is most remembered for. With Melbourne trailing and just minutes remaining in the game, Crompton had followed his Collingwood opponent up the ground and managed to pick up a loose ball in front of goal. He kicked the ball low towards goal and it floated through for his only goal of the season and gave Melbourne the lead. It was the last goal of the match, as well as the only goal Crompton kicked in the entirely of his second stint at Melbourne. It was Crompton's only grand final win with Melbourne; although he had been with the club during three other premierships, the only time he was previously selected in a grand final team was in the losing 1958 match.

Crompton left Melbourne to play 18 games for Glenelg (SANFL) in 1961. He kicked 37 goals in that season as a forward, more than in his entire career at Melbourne. After leaving Melbourne, Crompton captain-coached the Werribee Football Club in the Victorian Football Association (VFA) from 1967 to 1969, and Caulfield in the Federal Football League in 1970. He later coached VFA club Oakleigh in the late 1970s.

Cricket

Crompton was also a cricketer. A specialist batsman, he played 45 first-class matches cricket for Victoria between 1957 and 1962 and averaged 31.8. He played 119 First XI matches for the Melbourne Cricket Club, averaging 27.8.

== Statistics ==
Legend
G	Goals	K	Kicks	D	Disposals	T	Tackles
B	Behinds	H	Handballs	M	Marks
#	Played in that season's premiership team

Season	Team	No.	Games	Totals							Averages (per game)							Votes
Season	Team	No.	Games	G	B	K	H	D	M	T	G	B	K	H	D	M	T	Votes
1957	Melbourne	12	1	0	—N/a	—N/a	—N/a	—N/a	—N/a	—N/a	0.0	—N/a	—N/a	—N/a	—N/a	—N/a	—N/a	0
1958	Melbourne	12,25	8	8	—N/a	—N/a	—N/a	—N/a	—N/a	—N/a	1.0	—N/a	—N/a	—N/a	—N/a	—N/a	—N/a	0
1959	Melbourne	12	11	11	—N/a	—N/a	—N/a	—N/a	—N/a	—N/a	1.0	—N/a	—N/a	—N/a	—N/a	—N/a	—N/a	0
1960	Melbourne	12	5	4	—N/a	—N/a	—N/a	—N/a	—N/a	—N/a	0.8	—N/a	—N/a	—N/a	—N/a	—N/a	—N/a	0
1961	Melbourne	12	0	–	—N/a	—N/a	—N/a	—N/a	—N/a	—N/a	–	—N/a	—N/a	—N/a	—N/a	—N/a	—N/a	–
1962	Melbourne	5	19	0	—N/a	—N/a	—N/a	—N/a	—N/a	—N/a	0.0	—N/a	—N/a	—N/a	—N/a	—N/a	—N/a	10
1963	Melbourne	5	19	0	—N/a	—N/a	—N/a	—N/a	—N/a	—N/a	0.0	—N/a	—N/a	—N/a	—N/a	—N/a	—N/a	0
1964^{#}	Melbourne	5	19	1	—N/a	—N/a	—N/a	—N/a	—N/a	—N/a	0.1	—N/a	—N/a	—N/a	—N/a	—N/a	—N/a	5
1965	Melbourne	5	15	0	1	152	5	157	49	—N/a	0.0	0.1	10.1	0.3	10.5	3.3	—N/a	2
1966	Melbourne	5	2	0	0	17	0	17	5	—N/a	0.0	0.0	8.5	0.0	8.5	2.5	—N/a	0
Career			99	24	1	169	5	174	54	—N/a	0.2	0.1	9.9	0.3	10.2	3.2	—N/a	17

== See also ==
- List of Victoria first-class cricketers
