= 1964 VFL grand final =

Grand final of the 1964 Victorian Football League season

1964 VFL Grand Final

Melbourne	Collingwood
8.16 (64)	8.12 (60)
	1	2	3	4
MEL	2.6 (18)	5.7 (37)	7.10 (52)	8.16 (64)
COL	2.5 (17)	5.9 (39)	5.11 (41)	8.12 (60)
- Date: 19 September 1964
- Stadium: Melbourne Cricket Ground
- Attendance: 102,471

The 1964 VFL grand final was an Australian rules football game contested between the Collingwood Football Club and Melbourne Football Club, held at the Melbourne Cricket Ground on 19 September 1964. It was the 67th annual grand final of the Victorian Football League (VFL), staged to determine the premiers for the 1964 VFL season.

The match, attended by 102,471 spectators, was won by Melbourne by a margin of 4 points, marking the club's 12th premiership victory.

== Background ==
Melbourne, which had been the dominant team in the league for the past decade, was competing in its eleventh consecutive finals series, having previously played seven grand finals and won five premierships in that time; it was the club's first grand final since 1960. Collingwood was also in its first grand final since 1960.

== Match summary ==
With Melbourne leading by 11 points at three-quarter time, the match is remembered for its thrilling last quarter. In the early stages, Melbourne had plenty of opportunities to kick goals but could only manage behinds, and it was Collingwood's Des Tuddenham who kicked the first goal of the term.

Seventeen minutes into the quarter, Collingwood trailed by nine points, but narrowed the margin to three when Ray Gabelich kicked a goal from a boundary throw-in. Gabelich kicked another to take the lead soon afterwards, with a goal considered among the most famous in grand final history: he had received the ball near centre half-forward, and, due to Melbourne having spent the previous minutes in its own forward line and Collingwood moving the ball upfield quickly, there were no defenders ahead of him; a 109 kg ruckman, Gabelich ran towards the goal, bounced the ball four times, nearly losing it on each occasion, and, with Melbourne players gaining on him, kicked the goal from close range.

After play restarted, Melbourne's Barry Bourke kicked the ball into their forward line, and it was marked by rover Hassa Mann. He was directly in front and only 20 metres out, but his shot for goal came off the side of his boot and could only manage a behind. Melbourne had another chance to win the game, however, when they kicked the ball towards the goal square. A big pack of players went for the ball, but it spilled to the ground, and Melbourne defender Neil Crompton gathered the ball and kicked a goal. It was his only goal of the season, and he had only been forward because he'd followed his opponent upfield.

In the final minutes, Collingwood had the ball in its forward line. Collingwood's Ian Graham had a chance to goal with a difficult snap from the boundary but missed. Melbourne held on against intense pressure from Collingwood until the siren sounded, leaving Melbourne winners by four points.

=== Aftermath ===
The premiership was the sixth and last won by Melbourne under the coaching of Norm Smith over a ten-year period, which ranks among the most dominant periods by a club in VFL/AFL history. It was also the abrupt end to this period of success: captain Ron Barassi, who had played in all six premierships, signed with Carlton as captain-coach in 1965, and Smith was temporarily sacked as coach halfway through 1965 despite the club still having the league's equal-best record. This began a club-record 22-year finals drought not broken until 1987, and a club-record 57-year premiership drought not broken until 2021.

For more than sixty years, only 17 minutes of newsreel footage of the match was known to have survived. In June 2025, the television broadcast footage of the entire second half was discovered and published online by Richmond historian Rhett Bartlett.

== Teams ==
Melbourne	Collingwood

Melbourne
B:	5 Neil Crompton	37 Bernie Massey	8 Tassie Johnson
HB:	11 Tony Anderson	18 Brian Roet	40 Frank Davis
C:	9 Brian Dixon	35 Don Williams	6 Frank Adams
HF:	22 Bryan Kenneally	20 Graeme Jacobs	32 Barrie Vagg
F:	4 John Lord	14 Barry Bourke	16 John Townsend
Foll:	23 Graham Wise	31 Ron Barassi (c)	29 Hassa Mann
Res:	36 Peter McLean	10 Ken Emselle	
Coach:	Norm Smith		

Collingwood
B:	16 Ron Reeves	15 Ted Potter	9 Trevor Steer
HB:	13 Laurie Hill	8 John Mahon	33 Duncan Wright
C:	23 Ricky Watt	2 John Henderson (vc)	25 Bert Chapman
HF:	30 Des Tuddenham	21 Kevin McLean	26 David Norman
F:	5 Terry Waters	7 Ian Graham	27 Denis Dalton
Foll:	1 Ray Gabelich (c)	29 Kevin Rose	24 Mick Bone
Res:	19 Max Urquhart	3 Ken Turner (dvc)	
Coach:	Bob Rose		

Umpire: Ron Brophy

== Statistics ==
=== Score ===
Team	1	2	3	Final
Melbourne	2.6 (18)	5.7 (37)	7.10 (52)	8.16 (64)
Collingwood	2.5 (17)	5.9 (39)	5.11 (41)	8.12 (60)

=== Goalkickers ===
Melbourne:

- Townsend 3
- Lord 2
- Bourke 1
- Crompton 1
- Mann 1

Collingwood:

- Gabelich 2
- Bone 1
- Dalton 1
- Graham 1
- Steer 1
- Tuddenham 1
- Waters 1

For a long time, Terry Waters was credited with two goals in the grand final. In January 2020, historians reviewed the game and determined that one of Waters goals had been scored by Ian Graham instead, and the scorecard was amended. Waters admitted that he did not remember kicking one of his goals. Prior to the change, Waters was recognised as the outright leading Collingwood goalkicker for the year, with 43 goals, but the change brought a tie between Waters and Graham, on 42 apiece.

== See also ==
- 1964 VFL season
