= Albert Chapman (disambiguation) =

Albert Chapman was a politician.

Albert Chapman may also refer to:

- Albert Chapman (Australian footballer)
- Albert Chapman of British Gangsters: Faces of the Underworld
- Mrs. Albert Chapman, character in One, Two, Buckle My Shoe
- Albert Chapman Mineral Collection, see Mineral collecting
- Albert Chapman, character in Breakdown

== See also ==
- Bert Chapman (disambiguation)
