= 1963 Brownlow Medal =

- Winner: Bob Skilton (South Melbourne); 20 votes

Television/radio coverage
- Network: Seven Network

The 1963 Brownlow Medal was the 36th year the award was presented to the player adjudged the fairest and best player during the Victorian Football League (VFL) home and away season. Bob Skilton of the South Melbourne Football Club won the medal by polling twenty votes during the 1963 VFL season.

== Leading votegetters ==
	Player	Votes
1st	Bob Skilton (South Melbourne)	20
=2nd	Graham Farmer (Geelong)	17
=2nd	Darrel Baldock (St Kilda)	17
4th	John Henderson (Collingwood)	15
=5th	Kevin Murray (Fitzroy)	14
=5th	Alan Morrow (St Kilda)	14
=7th	Ken Fraser (Essendon)	13
=7th	Ian Law (Hawthorn)	13
9th	Jim Wallis (St Kilda)	11
=10th	Sergio Silvagni (Carlton)	10
=10th	Colin Youren (Hawthorn)	10
=10th	Ron Barassi (Melbourne)	10
=10th	Brian Dixon (Melbourne)	10
