= William Chapman =

William, Bill, or Billy Chapman may refer to:

== Arts and entertainment ==
- William Chapman (poet) (1850–1917), Canadian poet
- William Chapman (baritone) (1923–2012), American opera singer and actor
- William Rogers Chapman (1855–1935), American conductor, organist, pianist, composer, and music educator
- Billy Chapman (character), a fictional character in the Silent Night, Deadly Night franchise.

== Law and politics ==
- William Chapman (MP for Arundel) (fl. 1416), English politician, MP for Arundel
- William Chapman (MP for Bath) (fl. 1626), English politician, MP for Bath
- William W. Chapman (1808–1892), American politician and lawyer
- Bill Chapman (politician) (1910–1971), Australian politician in New South Wales

== Sports ==
- William Chapman (cricketer, fl. 1803), English professional cricketer
- William Chapman (Cambridgeshire cricketer) (1834–1908), English professional cricketer
- Bill Chapman (footballer), New Zealand footballer
- Billy Chapman (footballer) (1902–1967), English footballer

== Others ==
- William Chapman (engineer) (1749–1832), English engineer
- William Chapman (doctor) (1797–1867), British-born doctor in New Zealand
- William E. Chapman (fl. 1920s), American diplomat
- William Chapman (journalist) (1930–2019), American journalist

== See also ==
- Killing of William Chapman, 2015 police shooting
- Mauling of William Chapman, 2026 tiger mauling
- William Chapman Hewitson (1806–1878), British naturalist
- William Chapman Nyaho (born 1958), Ghanaian-American concert pianist
- William Chapman Ralston (1826–1875), American founder of the Bank of California
- Chapman Mortimer, pen name of British writer William Charles Chapman Mortimer (1907–1988)
- Robert William Chapman (disambiguation)
