= Peter McLean (Australian rules footballer) =

Australian rules footballer (1941–2009)

Personal information
- Born: 6 May 1941
- Died: 4 April 2009 (aged 67)
- Original team: Old Melburnians (VAFA)
- Height: 187 cm (6 ft 2 in)
- Weight: 86 kg (190 lb)

Playing career^{1}
Years	Club	Games (Goals)
1964–1965	Melbourne	28 (2)
1966–1968	Carlton	48 (5)
Total		76 (7)
- ^{1} Playing statistics correct to the end of 1968.

Peter McLean (6 May 1941 – 4 April 2009) was an Australian rules footballer who played for Melbourne and Carlton in the Victorian Football League (VFL) during the 1960s.

A utility player, McLean was a reserve in Melbourne's 1964 VFL Grand Final win over Collingwood which gave him the perfect end to his debut year. In 1966 he reunited with his former coach Ron Barassi at Carlton and was a member of their 1968 premiership side. It would be his final league season and he thus earned the distinction of being a premiership player in his first and last season, in both cases as a reserve.
