= Ron O'Dwyer =

Australian rules footballer

Personal information
- Full name: Ron O'Dwyer
- Born: 5 February 1938 (age 88)
- Original team: North Broken Hill
- Height: 170 cm (5 ft 7 in)
- Weight: 70 kg (154 lb)

Playing career^{1}
Years	Club	Games (Goals)
1956–1958	Carlton	13 (11)
1959–1961	Collingwood	27 (15)
Total		40 (26)
- ^{1} Playing statistics correct to the end of 1961.

Ron O'Dwyer (born 5 February 1938) is a former Australian rules footballer who played with Carlton and Collingwood in the Victorian Football League (VFL).

Originally from Broken Hill, O'Dwyer was a rover and played 10 of his 13 games for Carlton in the 1957 season.

He transferred to Collingwood for the 1959 season but again only appeared sporadically. In 1960 he participated in Collingwood's final series and was in their grand final losing team.

In 1962 he joined Western District Football League club Heywood, as senior coach. He played for Sandringham in 1966 and 1967.

O'Dwyer is now the President of a past players association called "AFL X-Men".
