= John Mahon (Australian footballer) =

Australian rules footballer

Personal information
- Full name: John Mahon
- Born: 12 February 1940
- Died: 23 November 2014 (aged 74)
- Original team: Xavier College
- Height: 180 cm (5 ft 11 in)
- Weight: 84 kg (185 lb)

Playing career^{1}
Years	Club	Games (Goals)
1961–1965	Collingwood	60 (1)
- ^{1} Playing statistics correct to the end of 1965.

John Mahon (12 February 1940 – 23 November 2014) was an Australian rules footballer who played with Collingwood in the Victorian Football League (VFL) during the 1960s.

After playing 30 games in his two years at Collingwood, Mahon injured his ankle in 1963 and made just one appearance that season. He recovered to play all 23 games in 1964 and was Collingwood's centre half-back in the grand final side which lost to Melbourne.

He played one more season with Collingwood and then joined Victorian Football Association club Prahran.

The Mahon family used to own the Yarra Hotel in Abbotsford.
