= Rob Chapman =

Rob Chapman may refer to:

- Rob Chapman (journalist) (born 1954), English rock musician, journalist, teacher and writer
- Rob Chapman (businessman) (born 1964), Australian businessman
- Rob Chapman (guitarist) (born 1975), English rock musician, guitarist, web-based teacher and entrepreneur

== See also ==
- Robert Chapman (disambiguation)
