= Graeme Jacobs =

Australian rules footballer (born 1944)

Personal information
- Born: 6 March 1944 (age 82)
- Original team: East Burwood
- Height: 189 cm (6 ft 2 in)
- Weight: 85 kg (187 lb)

Playing career^{1}
Years	Club	Games (Goals)
1964–1967	Melbourne	36 (49)
1968–1970	South Melbourne	57 (35)
Total		93 (84)
- ^{1} Playing statistics correct to the end of 1970.

Graeme Jacobs (born 6 March 1944) is a former Australian rules footballer who played with Melbourne and South Melbourne in the VFL during the 1960s.

Jacobs was member of a Melbourne premiership side in his debut season, lining up at centre half forward in the 1964 VFL Grand Final. He later struggled to make the team regularly and in 1968 crossed to South Melbourne where he played for the next three seasons.
