= Robert William Chapman =

Robert William Chapman may refer to:

- Robert William Chapman (engineer) (1866–1942), Australian mathematician and engineer
- Robert William Chapman (scholar) (1881–1960), British editor and book collector

== See also ==
- Robert Chapman (disambiguation)
- William Chapman (disambiguation)
