= Tony Anderson (Australian rules footballer) =

Australian rules footballer (1942–2020)

Personal information
- Full name: Thomas Garfield Anderson
- Born: 31 January 1942; Glenelg, South Australia
- Died: 1 April 2020 (aged 78)
- Height: 183 cm (6 ft 0 in)
- Weight: 83 kg (183 lb)

Playing career^{1}
Years	Club	Games (Goals)
1963–1969	Melbourne	75 (2)
- ^{1} Playing statistics correct to the end of 1969.

Career highlights
- VFL premiership player: 1964

Thomas Garfield Anderson (31 January 1942 – 1 April 2020), known as Tony Anderson, was an Australian rules footballer who played for Melbourne in the VFL during the 1960s.

Anderson made his VFL debut with Melbourne in 1963 and would form an important part of their defence throughout the rest of the decade. He was a half back flanker in Melbourne's 1964 premiership side and by the time he retired in 1969 had amassed 75 league games.

Anderson died on 1 April 2020, at the age of 78.
