= Denis Dalton (footballer) =

Australian rules footballer

Personal information
- Full name: Denis Francis Dalton
- Born: 10 October 1942 (age 84)
- Original team: Old Paradians
- Height: 170 cm (5 ft 7 in)
- Weight: 70 kg (154 lb)
- Position: Rover

Playing career^{1}
Years	Club	Games (Goals)
1964–65	Collingwood	9 (6)
- ^{1} Playing statistics correct to the end of 1965.

Denis Francis Dalton (born 10 October 1942) is a former Australian rules footballer who played for Collingwood in the Victorian Football League (VFL) during the 1960s.

== Australian rules ==
An Old Paradian, Dalton was used mostly as a rover in his two seasons at Collingwood. He appeared in the 1964 VFL Grand Final and kicked a goal from the forward pocket, in a four-point loss. Dalton later played for Preston in the Victorian Football Association, and finished equal-third for the J. J. Liston Trophy in 1967.
