= Ron Evans =

Australian rules footballer (1939–2007)

Personal information
- Born: 7 July 1939
- Died: 9 March 2007 (aged 67); Melbourne, Victoria, Australia
- Original team: Essendon Baptists
- Debut: 10 May 1958 (when 18), Essendon vs. Melbourne, at Melbourne Cricket Ground
- Height: 188 cm (6 ft 2 in)
- Weight: 78 kg (172 lb)

Playing career^{1}
Years	Club	Games (Goals)
1958–1962	Essendon	64 (210)
1963–1965	West Perth	60 (271)
Total		124 (481)
- ^{1} Playing statistics correct to the end of 1965.

Career highlights
- VFL Leading Goalkicker: 1959 (78 goals); 1960 (67 goals); 10 goals in one match (1960); 9 goals in one match (1959 twice); 8 goals in one match (1960); 7 goals in one match (1958); 6 goals in one match (1959 twice, 1960); Victorian Interstate team: 1959, 1960; WANFL Leading goalkicker: 1963 (97 goals); Victorian District Cricket: North Melbourne Cricket Club First XI: 126 games; Captain North Melbourne Cricket Club First XI; 5 catches, 3 stumpings in one match as wicket-keeper for North Melbourne

Ronald Barry Evans AM (7 July 1939 – 9 March 2007) was an Australian rules footballer, Chairman of the Australian Football League (AFL) from 1998 to 2007, as well as President of the Essendon Football Club from 1988 to 1992.

== Education ==
Evans was educated at Caulfield Grammar School in Melbourne, where he was a classmate of linguist Michael Clyne, businessman Ron Walker, and 1960 Brownlow Medal winner John Schultz.

He played full-forward in Caulfield Grammar's First XVIII, a team which also contained two other future VFL players: Ron Cabble who played with Hawthorn, and Footscray's John Schultz.

Evans later gained both a BSc and an MBA.

== Football career ==
Although not solidly built (he weighed 78 kg), he was 6'2" (188 cm), and his very long arms gave him extra inches in marking contests.

Recruited from Essendon Baptists in 1958 – he had broken the Essendon District Football League's Essendon goalkicking record in 1957 – he played his first senior match for Essendon, as a reserve, at the Melbourne Cricket Ground, against Melbourne on 10 May 1958.

Altogether, he played 64 games for Essendon from 1958 to 1962, mostly at full-forward, kicking 210 goals. He played his best football under coach Dick Reynolds.

He missed a number of games through injury in 1961; but, in 1962, John Coleman's second year as coach, he only played six senior games for Essendon, having lost his regular place at full-forward to Charlie Payne.

His brief senior record is impressive:

- 1958: 10 games (2 as a reserve), 27 goals (including 7 goals in one match) — plus 1 night game, 1 goal.
- 1959: 20 games, 78 goals (including 9 goals in a match on two occasions, and 6 goals in a match on another two occasions)
  - 1959: full-forward in losing Grand-Final team)1959 VFL season#Grand Final Teams
  - 1959: Victorian State Team
  - 1959: VFL Leading Goalkicker at 19 years, 78 goals (including 5 goals from only 6 touches in the 1959 First Semi-Final against Collingwood, and 2 goals in the losing grand final against Melbourne)
- 1960: 18 games, 67 goals (including 10 goals in a match on one occasion, 8 goals in a match on one occasion, and 6 goals in a match on another)
  - 1960: Victorian State Team
  - 1960: VFL Leading Goalkicker 67 goals (despite being the competition's leading goalkicker, Evans was held goal-less in Essendon's 1960 First Semi-Final loss to Collingwood)
- 1961: 10 games (1 as a reserve), 21 goals — plus 1 night game, 3 goals.
- 1962: 6 games, 16 goals
  - 1962: Last game for Essendon (as a reserve) against St Kilda on 4 August 1962.

In 1963, he moved to Western Australia, got his form back, and played a total of 60 games at full-forward for the West Perth Football Club in the Western Australian National Football League (WANFL) over three seasons from 1963 to 1965.

- 1963: 97 goals
  - 1963: WANFL Leading goalkicker.
- 1964: 84 goals
  - 1964: West Perth's Leading goalkicker.
- 1965: 90 goals
  - 1965: West Perth's Leading goalkicker.

He retired as a footballer at the end of the 1965 season at the age of 26.

== Cricket career ==
He was a fine wicket-keeper whilst at Caulfield Grammar School; and, much to the distress of its headmaster, S. W. Kurrle, who wanted him to play for the school's First XI, Evans played his first District cricket match for North Melbourne Cricket Club whilst still at school, at 16 years of age.

When he returned to Melbourne after his sojourn in Western Australia, he resumed his cricketing career with North Melbourne, and went on to play a total of 126 games for the North Melbourne First XI.

He captained the First XI, and was made a life member of the club. His club record of five catches and three stumpings as a North Melbourne First XI wicketkeeper has never been surpassed.

== Football administrator ==
He served on the committee of the Essendon Football Club from 1978 to 1987, having lost the 1981 election for president by a single vote to his former teammate Greg Sewell.

In 1988 he stood for president once again; and, despite Sewell being a hot favourite for the position, Evans won the election. He served as President of the Essendon Football Club from 1988 to 1992.

Evans unexpectedly announced his retirement as president of the Essendon F.C. at the end of 1992. As president he had been responsible for many significant events and changes, including engineering the 1992 move of Essendon's home matches to the Melbourne Cricket Ground and the 1991 retention of coach Kevin Sheedy when it seemed inevitable that Sheedy would move to New South Wales and coach the Sydney Swans.

Soon after his surprise resignation it was revealed that he had been appointed to one of the new positions of AFL commissioner whose task it was to guide, influence and direct the future of the AFL competition. He served as an AFL commissioner from 1993 to 1997 and from 1998 to 2007 he was the chairman of the AFL (i.e., the governing body of the premier Australian rules football competition).

== Business interests ==
Evans also became a very successful businessman, working as an executive for Spotless, and later as the company's managing director from 1992 to 2004.

On 12 June 2006, in the Queen's Birthday Honours List, he was made a Member (AM) of the Order of Australia for service to business and Australian rules football.

== Legacy ==
In 2006, the AFL announced that Evans was to have an abdominal tumor removed and that, due to his ill-health he was retiring. He died of abdominal cancer on 9 March 2007.

He was posthumously awarded membership in the administrator's Australian Football Hall of Fame in 2007.

The Ron Evans Medal was created in his name, awarded to the AFL Rising Star of that year, beginning in 2007, when it was inaugurally presented to Joel Selwood of the Geelong Football Club.

== See also ==
- List of Caulfield Grammar School people
