= Ron Cabble =

Australian rules footballer

Personal information
- Full name: Ronald James Cabble
- Born: 10 February 1938 (age 88)
- Original team: Koo-wee-rup / Caulfield Grammar
- Height: 175 cm (5 ft 9 in)
- Weight: 72 kg (159 lb)

Playing career^{1}
Years	Club	Games (Goals)
1957–62	Hawthorn	35 (14)
- ^{1} Playing statistics correct to the end of 1962.

Ronald James Cabble (born 10 February 1938) is a former Australian rules footballer who played with Hawthorn in the Victorian Football League (VFL).

== Family ==
The son of William James Cabble (1903-1960), and Ruby Fleetwood Cabble (1905-2003), née Croft, Ronald James Cabble was born on 10 February 1938.

== Education ==
He attended Caulfield Grammar School as a boarder from 1953 to 1955. He was a member of the school's tennis team.

He was also a member of the school's football team in 1954 — he was one of six from Caulfield Grammar selected to play for a combined Associated Grammar Schools of Victoria (ASGV) team against Melbourne High School on 13 August 1954 — and, along with John Schultz and Ron Evans, he was a member of the school's First XVIII that won its fourth consecutive ASGV premiership in 1955.

== Football ==
=== Hawthorn (VFL) ===
Having played well with the Seconds during the year, he was selected for his first game, against Geelong on 10 August 1957.

In his fourth game for the Hawthorn First XVIII he played in the forward pocket, kicking 3 goals, and named among the team's best players, in the team that defeated Carlton in the 1957 First Semi-Final, at the M.C.G., on 31 August 1957, 10.11 (71) to 6.12 (48). The match was remarkable for two reasons: the M.C.G. was swept by a fierce hail-storm just before the start of the third quarter, and it was the first-ever VFL Finals appearance for Hawthorn. His fifth game was two weeks later, in the Preliminary final, which Hawthorn 11.10 (76) lost to Melbourne 22.12 (144).

In his time at Hawthorn he played in 35 senior games, kicked 14 goals; and, as a half-forward flanker, played in Hawthorn's VFL Second XVIII premiership teams of 1958, and 1959.

=== Old Caulfield Grammarians (VAFA) ===
On leaving Hawthorn he played two seasons (1964 and 1965) with the Caulfield Grammarians Football Club in the Victorian Amateur Football Association (VAFA) until a knee injury forced his retirement from football.
