= Kevin McLean (Australian footballer, born 1942) =

Australian rules footballer

Personal information
- Full name: Kevin McLean
- Born: 10 September 1942 (age 84)
- Original team: Ivanhoe Amateurs
- Height: 185 cm (6 ft 1 in)
- Weight: 86 kg (190 lb)
- Position: Centre half back

Playing career^{1}
Years	Club	Games (Goals)
1963–65	Collingwood	33 (1)
1966–67	Hawthorn	17 (1)
Total		50 (2)
- ^{1} Playing statistics correct to the end of 1967.

Kevin McLean (born 10 September 1942) is a former Australian rules footballer who played for Collingwood and Hawthorn in the Victorian Football League (VFL) during the 1960s.

McLean was used in the key positions by Collingwood, mostly at centre half back. He played as a centre half forward in the 1964 VFL Grand Final, which they lost to Melbourne. The former Ivanhoe Amateur had kicked one of his two career goals in the Preliminary Final win the previous weekend. He finished his career with a two-season stint at Hawthorn.
