= Ray Nilsson =

Australian rules footballer (1938–2026)

Personal information
- Full name: Raymond Nilsson
- Born: 26 November 1938
- Died: 9 October 2026 (aged 87)
- Original team: Melbourne U-19s
- Debut: Round 8, 1960, Melbourne vs. Footscray, at the MCG
- Height: 177 cm (5 ft 10 in)
- Weight: 68 kg (150 lb)

Playing career^{1}
Years	Club	Games (Goals)
1960–1963	Melbourne	41 (44)
1964–1965	South Melbourne	21 (10)
Total		62 (54)
- ^{1} Playing statistics correct to the end of 1965.

Raymond Nilsson (26 November 1938 – 9 October 2026) was an Australian rules footballer who played for Melbourne and South Melbourne in the VFL during the early 1960s.

Nilsson was used as a rover and in the forward pocket at Melbourne but played as a wingman when he crossed to South Melbourne in 1964. He was a member of Melbourne's 1960 premiership team, coming off the bench. A good performer in finals football, he kicked a career high four goals in the 1962 Semi Final against Carlton at the MCG.

Nilsson died on 9 October 2026, at the age of 87.

== Sources ==
- Holmesby, Russell and Main, Jim (2007). The Encyclopedia of AFL Footballers. 7th ed. Melbourne: Bas Publishing.
