= Robert Schultz (footballer) =

Australian rules footballer

Personal information
- Full name: Robert Schultz
- Born: 13 February 1944
- Died: 29 October 2023 (aged 79)
- Original team: East Malvern
- Height: 183 cm (6 ft 0 in)
- Weight: 75 kg (165 lb)

Playing career^{1}
Years	Club	Games (Goals)
1963	Footscray	2 (0)
- ^{1} Playing statistics correct to the end of 1963.

Robert Schultz (13 February 1944 – 29 October 2023) was an Australian rules footballer who played with Footscray in the Victorian Football League (VFL).

== Family ==
He is the brother of John Schultz.
