= 1968 Brownlow Medal =

- Winner: Bob Skilton (South Melbourne); 24 votes

Television/radio coverage
- Network: Seven Network

The 1968 Brownlow Medal was the 41st year the award was presented to the player adjudged the fairest and best player during the Victorian Football League (VFL) home and away season. Bob Skilton of the South Melbourne Football Club won the medal by polling twenty-four votes during the 1968 VFL season.

== Leading votegetters ==
	Player	Votes
1st	Bob Skilton (South Melbourne)	24
2nd	Denis Marshall (Geelong)	21
3rd	Kevin Murray (Fitzroy)	18
=4th	John Nicholls (Carlton)	17
=4th	Carl Ditterich (St Kilda)	17
6th	Peter Hudson (Hawthorn)	16
=7th	Barry Davis (Essendon)	14
=7th	Peter Steward (North Melbourne)	14
=9th	Len Thompson (Collingwood)	12
=9th	David Parkin (Hawthorn)	12
=9th	Ian Stewart (St Kilda)	12
