= Robert Chapman =

Robert Chapman may refer to:

- Robert Chapman (cricketer) (born 1972), English cricketer
- Robert Chapman (pastor) (1803–1902), British evangelist
- Robert Chapman (died 1563), MP for Cambridge
- Robert Chapman (MP), MP for Kingston upon Hull
- Robert William Chapman (engineer) (1866–1942), South Australian mathematician
- Robert William Chapman (scholar) (1881–1960), British editor and book collector
- Sir Robert Chapman, 1st Baronet (1880–1963), Conservative Member of Parliament
- Robert F. Chapman (1926–2018), U.S. court of appeals judge
- R. H. Chapman (Robert Hall Chapman, 1890–1953), engineer, South Australian railways
- Robert Hett Chapman (1771–1833), president of the University of North Carolina
- Robert L. Chapman (1920–2002), American lexicographer
- Robert Chapman (academic) (1922–2004), New Zealand historian and political scientist
- Robert Chapman (playwright) (1919–2000), American playwright and drama professor
- Robert Chapman (philosopher), British philosopher of neurodiversity
- Sir Robert Chapman, 2nd Baronet (1911–1987), British landowner

== See also ==
- Rob Chapman (disambiguation)
- Robert William Chapman (disambiguation)
- Bert Chapman (disambiguation)
