= Peter Rosenbrock =

Australian rules footballer

Personal information
- Full name: Peter Edward Rosenbrock
- Born: 21 November 1939; Frankston, Victoria
- Died: 5 January 2005 (aged 65); Melbourne, Victoria
- Original team: Frankston Bombers
- Height: 184 cm (6 ft 0 in)
- Weight: 86 kg (190 lb)

Playing career^{1}
Years	Club	Games (Goals)
1960–1963	Collingwood	39 (1)
- ^{1} Playing statistics correct to the end of 1963.

Peter Edward Rosenbrock (21 November 1939 – 5 January 2005) was an Australian rules footballer who played with Collingwood in the Victorian Football League (VFL) during the early 1960s.

Rosenbrock was a key defender, used mostly at full-back by Collingwood. He didn't play in the first five rounds of the 1960 season but played every other game for the rest of the year, including Collingwood's grand final loss.

A broken leg sustained early in the 1963 VFL season kept him out of the side for the rest of the year and he wasn't able to make his way back.
