= Jim Wallis (footballer) =

Australian rules footballer (1941–2022)

Personal information
- Full name: James John Wallis
- Born: 12 November 1941
- Died: 27 May 2022 (aged 80)
- Original team: Quambatook
- Height: 192 cm (6 ft 4 in)
- Weight: 89 kg (196 lb)
- Position: Ruck

Playing career^{1}
Years	Club	Games (Goals)
1963–65	St Kilda	39 (41)
- ^{1} Playing statistics correct to the end of 1965.

James John Wallis (12 November 1941 – 27 May 2022) was an Australian rules footballer who played with St Kilda in the Victorian Football League (VFL).
