= Hubert Chapman =

Hubert Huntlea Chapman
- Born: 20 February 1910
- Died: 10 April 1972 (aged 62) Poole, Dorset
- Allegiance: United Kingdom
- Branch: Royal Air Force
- Service years: 1928–1963
- Rank: Air Vice Marshal
- Commands: No. 43 Group (1950–52); No. 3 Squadron (1938–40)
- Conflicts: Second World War
- Awards: Companion of the Order of the Bath; Commander of the Order of the British Empire; Mentioned in Despatches; Bronze Star (United States)

Air Vice Marshal Hubert Huntlea Chapman CB, CBE (20 February 1910 – 10 April 1972) was a senior Royal Air Force (RAF) officer.

== Early life and career ==
Born on 20 February 1910, Hubert Chapman was educated at Bedford School. He joined the Royal Air Force in 1928 and served during the Second World War. He was appointed as Air Officer Commanding No. 43 Group from 1950 to 1951, Director of Signals Policy from 1952 to 1953, Senior Air Staff Officer Headquarters No. 90 (Signals) Group, RAF Medmenham, from 1955 to 1958, Director-General of Technical Services at the Air Ministry from 1958 to 1961, and Air Officer-in-charge of Administration Maintenance Command from 1961 to 1963.

Chapman retired from the RAF in 1963. He died in Poole, Dorset on 10 April 1972.
