= Bert Chapman (footballer, born 1891) =

Australian rules footballer

Personal information
- Full name: Herbert George Chapman
- Born: 1 December 1891; Woollahra, New South Wales
- Died: 4 February 1970 (aged 78); St Kilda, Victoria
- Original team: Paddington

Playing career^{1}
Years	Club	Games (Goals)
1914	St Kilda	7 (1)
- ^{1} Playing statistics correct to the end of 1914.

Herbert George Chapman (1 December 1891 – 4 February 1970) was an Australian rules footballer who played for the St Kilda Football Club in the Victorian Football League (VFL).
