= Duncan Wright =

Australian rules footballer (1940–2023)

Personal information
- Full name: Duncan Livingston Wright
- Born: 28 August 1940; Finley, New South Wales
- Died: 1 May 2023 (aged 82); Heidelberg, Victoria
- Original team: Alphington Amateurs
- Height: 180 cm (5 ft 11 in)
- Weight: 73 kg (161 lb)
- Position: Half back flank

Playing career^{1}
Years	Club	Games (Goals)
1960, 1963–65	Collingwood	23 (1)
- ^{1} Playing statistics correct to the end of 1965.

Duncan Livingston Wright (28 August 1940 – 1 May 2023) was an Australian rules footballer who played for Collingwood in the Victorian Football League (VFL) during the first part of the 1960s.

A half back flanker, Wright made his VFL debut mid year in 1960 after arriving at the club from Alphington. He had to wait until 1963 to make another senior appearance and in 1964 was a member of Collingwood's losing grand final side.

Wright is best remembered for an incident in the opening quarter of the 1965 preliminary final when he knocked his opponent John Somerville of Essendon unconscious behind play. Somerville missed the following week's grand final which Essendon won while Wright never played in the VFL again after being sacked at preseason training in 1966. He instead moved to Canberra and became coach of Acton.

Duncan had two daughters, Fiona and Suzi. He died in Heidelberg, Victoria on 1 May 2023, at the age of 82.

== Sources ==
- Holmesby, Russell and Main, Jim (2007). The Encyclopedia of AFL Footballers. 7th ed. Melbourne: Bas Publishing.
