= William E. Chapman =

American diplomat

William E. Chapman was the American consul to Mexico in the late 1920s, and the American consul at Bilbao, Spain at the start of the Spanish Civil War.

On July 17, 1927, Chapman survived a gunshot wound at Puerto Mexico, Mexico where he was stationed as Consul of the United States. In the mid-1930s, Chapman was given a leave of absence to return to the United States by Secretary of State Cordell Hull due to Spanish insurgents operating under the orders of Francisco Franco.
