= Errol Hutchesson =

Australian rules footballer

Personal information
- Full name: Errol Hutchesson
- Born: 7 September 1939 (age 87)
- Original team: Jeparit
- Height: 175 cm (5 ft 9 in)
- Weight: 74 kg (163 lb)
- Position: Rover/Winger

Playing career^{1}
| Years | Club | Games (Goals) |
| 1958–1967 | Collingwood | 127 (62) |
| 1968–1972 | Prahran | 69 (82) |
| Total | | 196 (144) |
- ^{1} Playing statistics correct to the end of 1967.

Errol Hutchesson (born 7 September 1939) is a former Australian rules footballer who played with Collingwood in the Victorian Football League (VFL).

Hutchesson came to Collingwood from Jeparit and played the first three games of the 1958 season before breaking his leg. Collingwood went on to win the premiership with Hutchesson on the sidelines but he appeared on the wing in their losing 1960 and 1966 Grand Final teams. He gathered nine Brownlow Medal votes in 1966, which was the most by a Collingwood player that year.

After leaving the VFL, Hutchesson spent some time at Prahran where he played in a premiership.
