= 1959 VFL season =

63rd season of the Victorian Football League (VFL)

1959 VFL premiership season
- Teams: 12
- Premiers: Melbourne; 10th premiership
- Minor premiers: Melbourne; 7th minor premiership
- Consolation series: Fitzroy; 1st Consolation series win
- Brownlow Medallist: Verdun Howell (St Kilda); Bob Skilton (South Melbourne)
- Coleman Medallist: Ron Evans (Essendon)

Attendance
- Matches played: 112
- Total attendance: 2,711,649 (24,211 per match)
- Highest: 103,506

The 1959 VFL season was the 63rd season of the Victorian Football League (VFL), the highest level senior Australian rules football competition in Victoria. The season featured twelve clubs, ran from 18 April until 26 September, and comprised an 18-game home-and-away season followed by a finals series featuring the top four clubs.

The premiership was won by the Melbourne Football Club for the tenth time, after it defeated Essendon by 37 points in the 1959 VFL Grand Final.

== Background ==
In 1959, the VFL competition consisted of twelve teams of 18 on-the-field players each, plus two substitute players, known as the 19th man and the 20th man. A player could be substituted for any reason; however, once substituted, a player could not return to the field of play under any circumstances.

Teams played each other in a home-and-away season of 18 rounds; matches 12 to 18 were the "home-and-way reverse" of matches 1 to 7.

Once the 18 round home-and-away season had finished, the 1959 VFL Premiers were determined by the specific format and conventions of the Page–McIntyre system.

== Home-and-away season ==
=== Round 1 ===
Home team	Home team score	Away team	Away team score	Venue	Crowd	Date
Geelong	8.15 (63)	North Melbourne	12.14 (86)	Kardinia Park	17,200	18 April 1959
Fitzroy	19.17 (131)	Hawthorn	17.18 (120)	Brunswick Street Oval	18,000	18 April 1959
Collingwood	7.18 (60)	South Melbourne	14.17 (101)	Victoria Park	40,125	18 April 1959
Carlton	13.20 (98)	Essendon	11.18 (84)	Princes Park	30,000	18 April 1959
Richmond	10.10 (70)	Melbourne	16.21 (117)	Punt Road Oval	21,500	18 April 1959
St Kilda	9.15 (69)	Footscray	6.13 (49)	Junction Oval	27,600	18 April 1959

=== Round 2 ===
Home team	Home team score	Away team	Away team score	Venue	Crowd	Date
North Melbourne	16.12 (108)	Richmond	10.20 (80)	Arden Street Oval	12,000	2 May 1959
Essendon	18.15 (123)	St Kilda	12.15 (87)	Windy Hill	19,000	2 May 1959
Hawthorn	18.15 (123)	Geelong	12.12 (84)	Glenferrie Oval	14,000	2 May 1959
South Melbourne	13.21 (99)	Fitzroy	12.11 (83)	Lake Oval	27,250	2 May 1959
Melbourne	13.14 (92)	Collingwood	12.7 (79)	MCG	53,342	2 May 1959
Footscray	8.7 (55)	Carlton	15.14 (104)	Western Oval	29,438	2 May 1959

=== Round 3 ===
Home team	Home team score	Away team	Away team score	Venue	Crowd	Date
North Melbourne	9.9 (63)	St Kilda	8.10 (58)	Arden Street Oval	13,600	9 May 1959
Footscray	8.10 (58)	Hawthorn	15.12 (102)	Western Oval	17,417	9 May 1959
Fitzroy	13.9 (87)	Melbourne	11.8 (74)	Brunswick Street Oval	20,000	9 May 1959
Richmond	10.11 (71)	Geelong	14.12 (96)	Punt Road Oval	13,500	9 May 1959
South Melbourne	9.11 (65)	Essendon	7.10 (52)	Lake Oval	30,200	9 May 1959
Collingwood	9.8 (62)	Carlton	14.10 (94)	Victoria Park	33,903	9 May 1959

=== Round 4 ===
Home team	Home team score	Away team	Away team score	Venue	Crowd	Date
Hawthorn	19.14 (128)	South Melbourne	13.19 (97)	Glenferrie Oval	25,000	16 May 1959
Essendon	8.14 (62)	North Melbourne	11.11 (77)	Windy Hill	22,500	16 May 1959
Carlton	14.17 (101)	Richmond	9.7 (61)	Princes Park	24,500	16 May 1959
Melbourne	19.17 (131)	Footscray	9.12 (66)	MCG	24,538	16 May 1959
Geelong	13.12 (90)	Fitzroy	12.8 (80)	Kardinia Park	16,112	16 May 1959
St Kilda	12.19 (91)	Collingwood	8.16 (64)	Junction Oval	35,260	16 May 1959

=== Round 5 ===
Home team	Home team score	Away team	Away team score	Venue	Crowd	Date
Footscray	17.11 (113)	South Melbourne	13.8 (86)	Western Oval	19,475	23 May 1959
Essendon	11.18 (84)	Geelong	7.12 (54)	Windy Hill	18,000	23 May 1959
Carlton	10.13 (73)	Melbourne	9.7 (61)	Princes Park	36,120	23 May 1959
St Kilda	10.21 (81)	Hawthorn	11.11 (77)	Junction Oval	21,500	23 May 1959
North Melbourne	11.10 (76)	Fitzroy	9.19 (73)	Arden Street Oval	15,000	23 May 1959
Richmond	13.20 (98)	Collingwood	11.13 (79)	Punt Road Oval	24,000	23 May 1959

=== Round 6 ===
Home team	Home team score	Away team	Away team score	Venue	Crowd	Date
Richmond	11.17 (83)	St Kilda	16.10 (106)	Punt Road Oval	23,000	30 May 1959
Geelong	11.10 (76)	Melbourne	19.15 (129)	Kardinia Park	16,736	30 May 1959
Collingwood	16.16 (112)	Footscray	10.11 (71)	Victoria Park	24,740	30 May 1959
South Melbourne	8.18 (66)	North Melbourne	13.18 (96)	Lake Oval	20,700	30 May 1959
Fitzroy	11.9 (75)	Essendon	12.22 (94)	Brunswick Street Oval	22,000	30 May 1959
Hawthorn	11.9 (75)	Carlton	12.11 (83)	Glenferrie Oval	28,000	30 May 1959

=== Round 7 ===
Home team	Home team score	Away team	Away team score	Venue	Crowd	Date
Melbourne	14.17 (101)	South Melbourne	8.8 (56)	MCG	27,829	6 June 1959
Hawthorn	14.9 (93)	Richmond	8.15 (63)	Glenferrie Oval	14,500	6 June 1959
Essendon	15.11 (101)	Footscray	12.13 (85)	Windy Hill	23,000	6 June 1959
Collingwood	12.22 (94)	Geelong	9.7 (61)	Victoria Park	20,427	6 June 1959
Carlton	14.15 (99)	North Melbourne	10.11 (71)	Princes Park	41,985	6 June 1959
St Kilda	13.9 (87)	Fitzroy	9.26 (80)	Junction Oval	20,200	6 June 1959

=== Round 8 ===
Home team	Home team score	Away team	Away team score	Venue	Crowd	Date
Footscray	4.13 (37)	Richmond	9.9 (63)	Western Oval	11,533	13 June 1959
North Melbourne	12.12 (84)	Hawthorn	8.6 (54)	Arden Street Oval	12,500	13 June 1959
Fitzroy	5.10 (40)	Collingwood	3.12 (30)	Brunswick Street Oval	17,632	13 June 1959
South Melbourne	16.13 (109)	St Kilda	7.11 (53)	Lake Oval	29,500	15 June 1959
Melbourne	19.15 (129)	Essendon	8.8 (56)	MCG	52,880	15 June 1959
Geelong	11.13 (79)	Carlton	12.16 (88)	Kardinia Park	11,533	15 June 1959

=== Round 9 ===
Home team	Home team score	Away team	Away team score	Venue	Crowd	Date
Hawthorn	6.16 (52)	Melbourne	11.11 (77)	Glenferrie Oval	17,000	27 June 1959
Carlton	14.11 (95)	South Melbourne	14.21 (105)	Princes Park	33,150	27 June 1959
St Kilda	14.11 (95)	Geelong	6.22 (58)	Junction Oval	15,650	27 June 1959
North Melbourne	13.18 (96)	Footscray	9.14 (68)	Arden Street Oval	13,000	27 June 1959
Richmond	13.8 (86)	Fitzroy	10.21 (81)	Punt Road Oval	13,000	27 June 1959
Essendon	8.11 (59)	Collingwood	14.12 (96)	Windy Hill	23,000	27 June 1959

=== Round 10 ===
Home team	Home team score	Away team	Away team score	Venue	Crowd	Date
Richmond	10.13 (73)	South Melbourne	15.16 (106)	Punt Road Oval	21,000	4 July 1959
Collingwood	11.18 (84)	North Melbourne	9.9 (63)	Victoria Park	25,149	4 July 1959
St Kilda	11.10 (76)	Melbourne	9.23 (77)	Junction Oval	23,800	4 July 1959
Geelong	13.15 (93)	Footscray	10.15 (75)	Kardinia Park	14,150	4 July 1959
Hawthorn	14.13 (97)	Essendon	12.20 (92)	Glenferrie Oval	15,500	4 July 1959
Fitzroy	21.13 (139)	Carlton	10.13 (73)	Brunswick Street Oval	26,000	4 July 1959

=== Round 11 ===
Home team	Home team score	Away team	Away team score	Venue	Crowd	Date
Melbourne	20.8 (128)	North Melbourne	6.10 (46)	MCG	31,263	11 July 1959
Essendon	19.20 (134)	Richmond	10.9 (69)	Windy Hill	17,000	11 July 1959
Collingwood	10.15 (75)	Hawthorn	10.14 (74)	Victoria Park	24,502	11 July 1959
Carlton	15.21 (111)	St Kilda	8.18 (66)	Princes Park	27,668	11 July 1959
South Melbourne	17.16 (118)	Geelong	12.12 (84)	Lake Oval	16,600	11 July 1959
Footscray	6.17 (53)	Fitzroy	10.13 (73)	Western Oval	15,801	11 July 1959

=== Round 12 ===
Home team	Home team score	Away team	Away team score	Venue	Crowd	Date
Melbourne	13.10 (88)	Richmond	7.9 (51)	MCG	21,979	18 July 1959
Footscray	10.15 (75)	St Kilda	12.14 (86)	Western Oval	16,189	18 July 1959
North Melbourne	11.10 (76)	Geelong	8.15 (63)	Arden Street Oval	10,000	18 July 1959
Hawthorn	8.13 (61)	Fitzroy	8.19 (67)	Glenferrie Oval	15,500	18 July 1959
South Melbourne	6.9 (45)	Collingwood	12.13 (85)	Lake Oval	40,000	18 July 1959
Essendon	15.10 (100)	Carlton	7.18 (60)	Windy Hill	28,000	18 July 1959

=== Round 13 ===
Home team	Home team score	Away team	Away team score	Venue	Crowd	Date
Geelong	14.16 (100)	Hawthorn	13.13 (91)	Kardinia Park	10,072	25 July 1959
Fitzroy	13.19 (97)	South Melbourne	10.7 (67)	Brunswick Street Oval	17,024	25 July 1959
Collingwood	14.10 (94)	Melbourne	14.7 (91)	Victoria Park	30,343	25 July 1959
Carlton	9.9 (63)	Footscray	6.11 (47)	Princes Park	13,271	25 July 1959
Richmond	16.8 (104)	North Melbourne	10.16 (76)	Punt Road Oval	8,000	25 July 1959
St Kilda	12.13 (85)	Essendon	11.5 (71)	Junction Oval	18,100	25 July 1959

=== Round 14 ===
Home team	Home team score	Away team	Away team score	Venue	Crowd	Date
Geelong	12.15 (87)	Richmond	6.7 (43)	Kardinia Park	12,140	1 August 1959
Essendon	10.19 (79)	South Melbourne	8.14 (62)	Windy Hill	20,000	1 August 1959
Carlton	8.9 (57)	Collingwood	9.14 (68)	Princes Park	41,581	1 August 1959
St Kilda	10.15 (75)	North Melbourne	13.7 (85)	Junction Oval	17,500	1 August 1959
Hawthorn	14.15 (99)	Footscray	7.10 (52)	Glenferrie Oval	10,000	1 August 1959
Melbourne	11.11 (77)	Fitzroy	11.11 (77)	MCG	29,320	1 August 1959

=== Round 15 ===
Home team	Home team score	Away team	Away team score	Venue	Crowd	Date
Footscray	12.8 (80)	Melbourne	10.11 (71)	Western Oval	12,549	8 August 1959
Fitzroy	11.15 (81)	Geelong	6.11 (47)	Brunswick Street Oval	14,488	8 August 1959
Collingwood	12.18 (90)	St Kilda	9.11 (65)	Victoria Park	29,178	8 August 1959
South Melbourne	8.14 (62)	Hawthorn	10.3 (63)	Lake Oval	13,000	8 August 1959
North Melbourne	11.8 (74)	Essendon	16.14 (110)	Arden Street Oval	18,500	8 August 1959
Richmond	13.6 (84)	Carlton	14.20 (104)	Punt Road Oval	16,000	8 August 1959

=== Round 16 ===
Home team	Home team score	Away team	Away team score	Venue	Crowd	Date
Hawthorn	10.11 (71)	St Kilda	5.5 (35)	Glenferrie Oval	12,000	15 August 1959
Fitzroy	10.23 (83)	North Melbourne	7.11 (53)	Brunswick Street Oval	14,774	15 August 1959
Collingwood	17.17 (119)	Richmond	5.10 (40)	Victoria Park	23,856	15 August 1959
South Melbourne	11.10 (76)	Footscray	12.13 (85)	Lake Oval	14,100	15 August 1959
Geelong	12.9 (81)	Essendon	15.16 (106)	Kardinia Park	15,076	15 August 1959
Melbourne	13.14 (92)	Carlton	7.5 (47)	MCG	53,479	15 August 1959

=== Round 17 ===
Home team	Home team score	Away team	Away team score	Venue	Crowd	Date
North Melbourne	6.6 (42)	South Melbourne	19.20 (134)	Arden Street Oval	12,500	22 August 1959
Essendon	11.8 (74)	Fitzroy	7.12 (54)	Windy Hill	30,000	22 August 1959
Carlton	13.20 (98)	Hawthorn	14.12 (96)	Princes Park	18,720	22 August 1959
St Kilda	18.15 (123)	Richmond	13.19 (97)	Junction Oval	14,500	22 August 1959
Melbourne	17.18 (120)	Geelong	9.12 (66)	MCG	21,646	22 August 1959
Footscray	5.5 (35)	Collingwood	8.17 (65)	Western Oval	33,960	22 August 1959

=== Round 18 ===
Home team	Home team score	Away team	Away team score	Venue	Crowd	Date
Fitzroy	20.12 (132)	St Kilda	13.12 (90)	Brunswick Street Oval	18,253	29 August 1959
South Melbourne	8.13 (61)	Melbourne	10.16 (76)	Lake Oval	22,500	29 August 1959
Richmond	10.13 (73)	Hawthorn	17.14 (116)	Punt Road Oval	10,000	29 August 1959
Footscray	10.14 (74)	Essendon	17.15 (117)	Western Oval	29,629	29 August 1959
Geelong	5.8 (38)	Collingwood	17.19 (121)	Kardinia Park	21,822	29 August 1959
North Melbourne	8.11 (59)	Carlton	12.14 (86)	Arden Street Oval	23,200	29 August 1959

== Ladder ==
(P)	Premiers
	Qualified for finals

#	Team	P	W	L	D	PF	PA	%	Pts
1	Melbourne (P)	18	13	4	1	1731	1213	142.7	54
2	Carlton	18	13	5	0	1534	1404	109.3	52
3	Collingwood	18	12	6	0	1477	1215	121.6	48
4	Essendon	18	11	7	0	1598	1422	112.4	44
5	Fitzroy	18	10	7	1	1533	1351	113.5	42
6	North Melbourne	18	10	8	0	1331	1490	89.3	40
7	Hawthorn	18	9	9	0	1592	1412	112.7	36
8	St Kilda	18	9	9	0	1428	1515	94.3	36
9	South Melbourne	18	8	10	0	1515	1465	103.4	32
10	Geelong	18	5	13	0	1320	1681	78.5	20
11	Richmond	18	4	14	0	1309	1771	73.9	16
12	Footscray	18	3	15	0	1178	1607	73.3	12

Rules for classification: 1. premiership points; 2. percentage; 3. points for
Average score: 81.2
Source: AFL Tables

== Finals series ==
=== Semi-finals ===
Team	1 Qtr	2 Qtr	3 Qtr	Final
Collingwood	1.4	4.8	5.11	8.14 (62)
Essendon	2.5	4.9	10.11	14.16 (100)
Attendance: 86,198

Team	1 Qtr	2 Qtr	3 Qtr	Final
Melbourne	2.6	6.8	9.12	11.15 (81)
Carlton	0.0	1.4	2.9	4.13 (37)
Attendance: 72,822

=== Preliminary final ===
Team	1 Qtr	2 Qtr	3 Qtr	Final
Carlton	0.1	3.7	5.8	7.8 (50)
Essendon	1.4	4.5	6.8	8.9 (57)
Attendance: 65,896

=== Grand final ===
Team	1 Qtr	2 Qtr	3 Qtr	Final
Melbourne	1.4	8.5	11.10	17.13 (115)
Essendon	3.5	7.8	10.10	11.12 (78)
Attendance: 103,506

== Consolation Night Series Competition ==
The night series were held under the floodlights at Lake Oval, South Melbourne, for the teams (5th to 12th on ladder) out of the finals at the end of the season.

Final: Fitzroy 10.10 (70) defeated Hawthorn 4.16 (40)

== Season notes ==
- The VFL threatened to move matches away from Windy Hill and the St Kilda Cricket Ground at the start of the season owing to a dispute with the Essendon and St Kilda Cricket Clubs. Cricket club members were entitled to purchase football club season tickets for one third of face value, but 1957–58 cricket club members had paid for their 1958 football tickets at 1957 prices instead of 1958 prices. Following a ruling by the state Minister for Lands, the cricket clubs paid the balance in mid-April, and no matches were moved.
- The committee of the Essendon, fifth on the ladder at the end of 1958, took the innovative step of employing Bert Willee, the chief lecturer in physical education at the University of Melbourne, to design and supervise the delivery of a carefully planned programme of physical training for each player, taking into account the special requirements of each playing position, as well as concentrating on the special needs of each individual player. Essendon played in the 1959 Grand Final, having finished the season in fourth place.
- From 1959, VFL Second Eighteens' matches and were played as curtain-raisers to seniors matches, having previously been played at the same time as the seniors at a different venue. The Third Eighteens' matches were now played at a different venue to the seniors, having been played as the main curtain-raiser until 1958.
- The VFL introduced the premiership cup, to be awarded to the Premiership team immediately after the Grand Final Match.
- After the conclusion of the Round 3 match between Carlton and Collingwood, an irate Collingwood fan jumped the boundary fence and threatened field umpire Bob Nunn. A policeman rushed to the umpire's aid, saying to the fan "Hit him and I'll knock your block off". The fan ran off the ground.
- As Carlton team was running down the players race at the Brunswick Street Oval before the start of its round 10 match against Fitzroy, Carlton centre half-back Bob Crowe stumbled and fell, badly injuring his knee (before he had reached the playing field). A short time after the match began, it was obvious that Crowe was in great pain and was totally unable to keep up with the play. Carlton appealed to the field umpire, and they were allowed to substitute one of their reserves for Crowe, even though he had taken the field.
- The Collingwood Secretary, Gordon Carlyon and four Collingwood footballers received death threats before the Round 14 match against Carlton that are thought to have been connected with a potential betting plunge.
- Despite losing its first five matches, the 1958 premiers Collingwood reached the final four.

== Awards ==
- The 1959 VFL Premiership team was Melbourne.
- The VFL's leading goalkicker was Ron Evans of Essendon who kicked 79 goals (including 10 goals in the final series).
- The winner of the 1959 Brownlow Medal was Bob Skilton of South Melbourne with 20 votes. He won on a count-back from Verdun Howell of St Kilda.
  - As a consequence of its 1981 decision to change its rules relating to tied Brownlow Medal contests, the AFL awarded a retrospective medal to Verdun Howell in 1989.
- Footscray took the "wooden spoon" in 1959.

== Sources ==
- 1959 VFL season at AFL Tables
- 1959 VFL season at Australian Football
