= Eddie Rosenbrock =

Australian rules footballer (1908-1978)

Personal information
- Full name: Edward Joseph Rosenbrock
- Born: 6 February 1908; West Ham, London, England
- Died: 19 May 1978 (aged 70); Frankston, Victoria
- Original team: Ferntree Gully

Playing career^{1}
Years	Club	Games (Goals)
1929–1930	South Melbourne	4 (0)
- ^{1} Playing statistics correct to the end of 1930.

Edward Joseph Rosenbrock (6 February 1908 – 19 May 1978) was an Australian rules footballer who played with South Melbourne in the Victorian Football League (VFL).

== Family ==
The son of Frederick John Rosenbrock (1869-1942), and Margaret Elizabeth Rosenbrock (1869-1934), née Corbett, Edward Joseph Rosenbrock was born at West Ham, London, England on 6 February 1908. He migrated with his family to Australia in 1912.

He married Ada Helen Georgiana "Dolly" Mustow (1910-2001) in 1938.

== Football ==
Having played in the club's 1928 premiership side, he was recruited, by South Melbourne, from the Ferntree Gully Football Club in the Scoresby District Football Association.

In 1930 he was cleared from South Melbourne to Brighton.

In 1935 he was cleared from Brighton to Frankston.

In 1936 he was cleared from Frankston to Brighton.

In 1937 he was cleared from Brighton to Frankston.
