= John Somerville (Australian footballer) =

Australian rules footballer

Personal information
- Born: 8 December 1939
- Died: 12 November 1984 (aged 44)
- Original team: Moe (LVFL)
- Debut: 21 May 1960, Essendon vs. Carlton, at Windy Hill
- Height: 188 cm (6 ft 2 in)
- Weight: 79 kg (174 lb)

Playing career^{1}
Years	Club	Games (Goals)
1960–1967	Essendon	106 (96)
- ^{1} Playing statistics correct to the end of 1967.

Career highlights
- Essendon premiership player: 1962

John Somerville (8 December 1939 – 12 November 1984) was an Australian rules footballer who played 106 senior games for the Essendon Football Club from 1960 to 1967.

== Career ==
Recruited from Moe Football Club, he played his first match for the Essendon senior team in Round 5 of the 1960 season, against Carlton, at Essendon's home ground, Windy Hill.

He played on the half-forward flank, kicking 96 goals in his 106 game career.

He played in the 1962 Essendon premiership team that beat Carlton 13.12 (90) to 8.10 (58).

== 1965 Preliminary Final ==
Within the first 10 minutes of the 1965 Preliminary Final between Essendon and Collingwood Somerville was knocked unconscious by an opponent, the Collingwood half-back flanker Duncan Wright.

At the time, Wright and Somerville were some 90 metres behind the play and were isolated by some 30 metres from all other players, and were much closer to the boundary than they were to the central goal-to-goal line.

Somerville was so badly injured that he was taken off the field on a stretcher and was taken to hospital immediately. Due to the severity of his injuries, he was unable to play in the following week's Grand Final.

Essendon, backed by a now polarised crowd, went on to beat Collingwood 14.21 (105) to 6.6 (42).

== Aftermath ==
There was a public outcry; and the press was outraged:

"Collingwood should give an immediate open clearance to the player responsible for this despicable action. It is a blot on our great game and to the greatest club in the VFL." Former Collingwood champion rover Thorold Merrett, commentating on ABV 2.

"Saturday's brutal and cowardly assault on Essendon's John Somerville points out the crying need for stewards in Australian football. There can be no doubt in the minds of any of the 95,386 people at Saturday's game, or in the minds of the umpires, just who was responsible for the attack on Somerville." Mike Throssell, football writer for The Australian.

The police (including the homicide squad) made some preliminary enquiries. The match officials, the field umpire Ron Brophy, the two boundary umpires, and the two goal umpires all claim to have seen nothing.

The field umpire, Ron Brophy, was never selected to umpire a VFL match again.

Wright, too, denied everything.

However, many years later, Wright openly admitted that he had indeed felled Somerville, and claimed that his actions had been in response to Somerville's niggling — which (Wright claimed) had started from the moment that the taller, far more skilful Somerville had been swapped over, by Essendon's coach John Coleman, from his selected position on the opposite half-forward flank, to play on Wright.

Wright, was renowned for his hot-headed violence:

Wright, slightly built but with large hands, was never a great player. He was a solid contributor rather than a star. He had pace and tenacity as well as a mean streak about him, but was not a very good kick. His best contribution to a football team was the fear he instilled in opposition players. His reputation was that of someone who could lose control of his temper quite easily on occasion. Once he had a confrontation during a cricket match that resulted in him being in trouble with the game's authorities, and he had also been involved in a huge altercation with the Lord twins, Alistair and Stewart, at Geelong. During the game Wright had taken a mark and saw that one of the twins was headed towards him so he secured the ball under his arm and threw out a right cross. Down went the first one. The second Lord then headed over so Wright simply tucked the ball under his other arm and disposed of him with his left.

— Strevens, (2004), p.151

The Collingwood coach, the champion rover, the boxer, and Bob Rose were far from impressed with Wright's knockout. During the 1966 pre-season practice matches, Wright was told by football club secretary Jack Burns that his services were no longer required at Collingwood. He never played another VFL game.

== After Essendon ==
Somerville left Essendon at the end of 1967, and was appointed coach of Numurkah Football Club in 1968. John Somerville Captain/Coached Hamilton Imperials, in the Western Boarder Football League in 1970 and 1971.

He is the father of Peter Somerville and Dean Somerville.
