= John Schultz (footballer, born 1938) =

Australian rules footballer (1938–2024)

- Queen Elizabeth with Schultz in 1970

Personal information
- Full name: Alan John Schultz
- Born: 28 September 1938
- Died: 1 September 2024 (aged 85); Frankston
- Original team: Caulfield Grammarians
- Height: 191 cm (6 ft 3 in)
- Weight: 89 kg (196 lb)

Playing career^{1}
Years	Club	Games (Goals)
1958–1968	Footscray	188 (37)
- ^{1} Playing statistics correct to the end of 1968.

Career highlights
- Brownlow Medal 1960; 5× Charles Sutton Medal 1960, 1962, 1964, 1965, 1966; All-Australian team 1961; Victorian representative (24 games, 3 goals); Australian Sports Medal: 2000

Alan John Schultz (28 September 1938 – 1 September 2024) was an Australian rules footballer who played for Footscray in the Victorian Football League (VFL) between 1958 and 1968.

He had been a champion high-jumper at Caulfield Grammar School, winning the senior high jump at the 1955 Associated Grammar Schools Combined Athletics Meeting (as had South Melbourne's Jim Taylor in 1948). He also played for the school's First XVIII, a team which also contained other future VFL players, Ron Evans of Essendon and Ron Cabble of Hawthorn.

== VFL career ==
Schultz was recruited by Footscray from the countryside Boort, having previously played briefly with Caulfield Grammarians Football Club in the Victorian Amateur Football Association (he broke his arm at the opening bounce of the first Caulfield Grammarians' practice match of the 1956 season).

Schultz won the Brownlow Medal in 1960 (when only 21 years old) by one vote from Fitzroy's Kevin Murray. He was Footscray's best and fairest player five times (1960, 1962, 1964–66). Schultz played for Victoria 21 times and was an All-Australian in 1961.

Schultz was considered a "gentle giant", known as much for his fairness as for his brilliance. An effective knock ruckman, he was acclaimed for good tackling, elegant marking, and hard, fair bumping. Roy Wright, another "gentle giant" and Brownlow medallist, helped him early in his career: "after lining up on Roy Wright in one of my first matches, he came to the dressing rooms after the match and gave me a few hints on things I did and didn't do right". Compared with others of his day, Schultz had exceptional stamina, and he seemed to be able to run just as quickly at the end of a match as he had at its beginning.

In 1961, Footscray, playing a fast game using the soon-to-be-outlawed "flick pass", won through to their second Grand Final, this time against Hawthorn, who were playing in their first Grand Final. On a hot day, in front of over 100,000 spectators, the Hawks, dubbed Kennedy's Commandos for their fanatical approach to fitness, overran the Bulldogs in the second half to claim their first VFL premiership.

Schultz played as an amateur. He played his entire VFL with the legendary Ted Whitten as his captain, and retired in 1968, aged only twenty-nine, to help manage the family grocery business.

His younger brother Robert, also from Caulfield Grammar School, played two senior games for Footscray in 1963.

== Post-VFL career ==
Fittingly for a man known for his fairness and never once reported, Schultz later served on the league tribunal. He once said, "I love nothing more than seeing someone shake another player's hand after a tough game – that's the ultimate in sportsmanship." In 1996, Schultz was inducted into the Australian Football Hall of Fame with the following citation:

Rucking giant who never let the side down. Set the standard for the modern ruckman.

In April 1970, when Queen Elizabeth and Prince Philip watched a match of VFL football at the Melbourne Cricket Ground, Schultz was chosen by the VFL to sit between them to explain aspects of the game.

In 2002, Schultz was named in the back pocket of the Footscray/Western Bulldogs Team of the Century.

Until his death, Schultz was still heavily involved at the Bulldogs, serving as a mentor to the playing group. He was given the honour of handing the Premiership cup to Easton Wood, Luke Beveridge and Bob Murphy after the Western Bulldogs won the 2016 AFL Grand Final.

== Personal life and death ==
Schultz lived in Shoreham, a town on the Mornington Peninsula. His wife Elaine, who came from Durham Ox, near Boort, died in 2013.

Schultz died on 1 September 2024, at the age of 85.

== See also ==
- List of Caulfield Grammar School people
