= Bert Chapman =

Australian rules footballer

Personal information
- Full name: Albert J. Chapman
- Born: 14 March 1942 (age 84)
- Original team: Heidelberg
- Height: 170 cm (5 ft 7 in)
- Weight: 65 kg (143 lb)
- Position: Rover

Playing career^{1}
Years	Club	Games (Goals)
1960–1966	Collingwood	68 (35)
- ^{1} Playing statistics correct to the end of 1966.

Bert Chapman (born 14 March 1942) is a former Australian rules footballer who played for Collingwood in the Victorian Football League (VFL) during the 1960s.

Chapman was primarily a rover and in just six seasons managed eight finals appearances. This included the 1960 and 1964 VFL Grand Finals, where he was a reserve and wingman respectively. He left for Preston in 1967 and spent two years with the VFA club. Chapman then joined Macedon in the Riddell District Football League as coach for the 1969 season.
