= Ron Reeves =

Australian rules footballer

Personal information
- Born: 6 December 1938 (age 87)
- Original team: East Melbourne YCW
- Debut: Round 18, 1957, Collingwood vs. St Kilda, at Junction Oval
- Height: 175 cm (5 ft 9 in)
- Weight: 76 kg (168 lb)

Playing career^{1}
Years	Club	Games (Goals)
1957–1965	Collingwood	122 (2)
- ^{1} Playing statistics correct to the end of 1965.

Ronald 'Ron' Reeves (born 6 December 1938) is a former Australian rules footballer who played for Collingwood in the VFL during the late 1950s and early 1960s.

Reeves was a back pocket specialist, recruited from East Melbourne. He played for Collingwood's Under-19s before breaking into the seniors and in 1958 became a regular in their defence. That year he was a member of their premiership side and also played in the club's losing Grand Finals of 1960 and 1964.
