= Bryan Kenneally =

Australian rules footballer

Personal information
- Born: 26 March 1942
- Original team: Lyndhurst-Hampton Park
- Height: 180 cm (5 ft 11 in)
- Weight: 79 kg (174 lb)

Playing career^{1}
Years	Club	Games (Goals)
1959–1969	Melbourne	171 (68)
- ^{1} Playing statistics correct to the end of 1969.

Bryan Kenneally (born 26 March 1942) is a former Australian rules footballer who played with Melbourne in the VFL during the 1960s.

Kenneally was a versatile footballer and played in Melbourne's 1960 and 1964 premiership sides, as a wingman and half forward flanker respectively. For the rest of his career he was a ruck-rover, filling the position vacated by Ron Barassi and he earned selection to the Victorian interstate team in 1967.
