= Bob Skilton =

Australian rules footballer, born 1938

Personal information
- Full name: Robert John Skilton
- Nickname: "Chimp"
- Born: 8 November 1938 (age 87)
- Original team: South Melbourne Under 17s
- Height: 171 cm (5 ft 7 in)
- Weight: 76 kg (168 lb)
- Position: Rover

Playing career^{1}
Years	Club	Games (Goals)
1956–1971	South Melbourne	237 (412)

Representative team honours
Years	Team	Games (Goals)
	Victoria	25 (47)

Coaching career^{3}
Years	Club	Games (W–L–D)
1965–1966	South Melbourne	35 (16–19–0)
1974–1977	Melbourne	88 (28–60–0)
Total		123 (44–79–0)
- ^{1} Playing statistics correct to the end of 1971.^{3} Coaching statistics correct as of 1977.

Career highlights
- Club: 3× Brownlow Medal: 1959, 1963, 1968; 9× South Melbourne Best and Fairest: 1958–59, 1961–65, 1967–68; 3× South Melbourne leading goal kicker: 1959, 1962–63; South Melbourne captain: 1961–71; Australian Football Hall of Fame – Legend Status: 1996; AFL Team of the Century (rover); South Melbourne Team of the Century (rover, captain); Representative: Australian National Football Carnival Championship: 1958

Robert John Skilton OAM (born 8 November 1938) is a former Australian rules footballer who represented South Melbourne in the Victorian Football League (VFL).

Playing as a rover, Skilton is one of only four players to have won the Brownlow Medal three times—in 1959 (when he tied with Verdun Howell), 1963 and 1968. His Brownlow record is shared by Fitzroy's Haydn Bunton, Sr (1931, 1932, 1935), Essendon's Dick Reynolds (1934, 1937, 1938) and St Kilda and Richmond Tigers Ian Stewart (1965, 1966, 1971).

He was rated by Jack Dyer as better than Haydn Bunton, Sr and equal to Dick Reynolds, making him one of the best players in the history of the game. In September 2023 Skilton was elevated to Legend status in the Sport Australia Hall of Fame, only the 4th AFL player to achieve the honour.

The Sydney Swans Best and Fairest medal is named after him; the Bob Skilton Medal.

== Family ==
The son of Robert Herbert Skilton (1901–1987) and Rita Skilton (1904–?), née McFarlane, Robert John Skilton was born on 8 November 1938.

His father, known as "Bobby", was a 440-yard professional athlete who played 149 games for Port Melbourne in the VFA from 1922 to 1929. As a prisoner of war of the Japanese, he survived the ordeal of working on the infamous Burma Railway.

He married Marion Joyce Stirling in 1960.

== Football ==
Only 171 cm tall, Skilton was particularly fast and a skilled baulker, allowing him to evade opponents when necessary. He was never shy of attacking the ball, however, and in his 16-year career suffered many injuries, including concussion, a broken nose four times, a broken wrist three times and twelve black eyes.

One of his greatest assets was the ability to kick with both feet, a skill learned at the insistence of his father and developed by spending hours kicking the ball against a wall, collecting it on the rebound and kicking again with the other foot. It was impossible to say whether he was right or left footed, since his left foot gave greater accuracy, but his right greater distance. He had arguably the most accurate stab kick in the game.

Star of the 1953 Victorian Schoolboys' team (he kicked eight goals against West Australia in one of the championship's matches), and best and fairest for the South Melbourne (under 17) Fourth XVIII which played in the Melbourne Boys League in 1955, Skilton made his senior debut at the age of 17 in round five, 1956, and went on to play 237 matches for South Melbourne before he retired in 1971, at the time a club record. He scored 412 goals in that time and was the club's leading goalkicker on three occasions. Nicknamed "Chimp", he showed great grit and determination and became well known for giving maximum effort at all times.

It was his appearance on the front page of The Sun News-Pictorial in 1968 with two black eyes that earned him the Douglas Wilkie Medal. The black eyes were a consequence of a severe facial injury, which included depressed fractures of his cheekbones, due to collisions in successive weeks from Footscray's Ken Greenwood, his own teammate John Rantall and Len Thompson.

An extended series of graphic photographs displaying the true extent of Skilton's injury used to be on display at the team's rooms at the Lake Oval, prior to its move to Sydney (it is not on display in Sydney and it is commonly understood that it was first removed from display at the Lake Oval as part of the effort to get Tuddenham to coach South Melbourne in 1978).

He missed the entire 1969 VFL season after snapping an achilles tendon in a pre-season practice match against SANFL club Port Adelaide.

Chosen to represent his state in 25 games, Skilton captained the Victorian team in 1963 and 1965. The downside of his career was the lack of success of his club. He often said that he would trade any of his three Brownlow Medals for a premiership or even the chance to play in a Grand Final, and felt the highest point of his career was the one occasion South Melbourne made the finals in 1970 (under the great Norm Smith), finishing fourth after losing the first semi-final against St Kilda.

After 16 years at South Melbourne, including two years as playing coach in 1965–1966, and nine club best and fairest awards, Skilton then played for his boyhood team, Port Melbourne in the Victorian Football Association and later coached Melbourne from 1974 to 1977, with a best finish of sixth. Since then, Skilton has been honoured by being named captain of the Swans' team of the century, and named in the AFL team of the century. He was also the player featured inside the cover of the booklets of stamps featuring the Swans released by Australia Post to commemorate the centenary of the VFL/AFL.

Skilton made a speech in the post-match presentations of the 2005 AFL Grand Final following his team's first win in 72 years, and he was tasked to present the trophy at the 2012 AFL Grand Final.

Skilton is also the number-one ticket holder at the Ormond Amateur Football Club, who compete in the Victorian Amateur Football Association.

== Recognition ==
1985 – Sport Australia Hall Fame inductee

2018 Queens Birthday Honours, Skilton was awarded the Order of Australia Medal (OAM).

2023 – Sport Australia Hall of Fame Legend

== Bibliography ==
- Ken Piesse (1995). The Complete Guide to Australian Football. Pan Macmillan Australia. ISBN 0-330-35712-3.
