= Verdun Howell =

Australian rules footballer

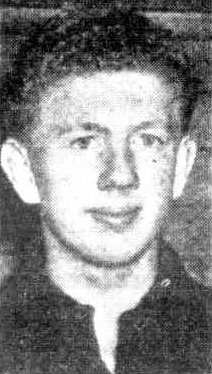

Personal information
- Full name: Verdun John Howell
- Born: 16 June 1937 (age 89); Tasmania
- Original team: City-South

Playing career^{1}
Years	Club	Games (Goals)
1953–1957	City-South	67
1958–1968	St Kilda	159 (59)
Total		226 (59)

Coaching career
Years	Club	Games (W–L–D)
1971	Richmond	1 (0–1–0)
1972–1974	Claremont	66 (30–36–0)
- ^{1} Playing statistics correct to the end of 1968.

Career highlights
- St Kilda Best and Fairest 1959; Brownlow Medallist (tied with Bob Skilton) 1959; Premiership player 1966; Victorian state representative nine times; St Kilda Football Club Hall of Fame inductee 2003; Tamanian Sport Hall of Fame inductee 2013; Australian Football Hall of Fame inductee 2016

Verdun John Howell (born 16 June 1937) is a former Australian rules footballer who played senior football in Tasmania and in the VFL (now AFL).

Howell played with City-South from 1953 to 1957. He was a member of that club's 1954 and 1956 NTFA premiership teams and in 1957 won City's best and fairest award.

Howell made his VFL debut with the St Kilda Football Club in 1958 after being signed from Tasmania in 1953. He initially played on the half forward line, then later as a half back before playing with the Saints as a full back, where he won the 1959 Brownlow Medal, tying with Bob Skilton. (The medal was awarded retrospectively in 1989 after the countback rule was removed in 1980.) Later in his career he spent some time in the forward line, once kicking nine goals against Hawthorn. He was vice captain to Darrel Baldock for several seasons. In one game against North Melbourne during the 1965 season, coach Allan Jeans played Howell at one end of the ground for the whole game – fullback when St Kilda kicked against the wind and full-forward when they kicked with it.

After his retirement as a player, Howell was appointed Assistant Coach to Tom Hafey at Richmond for three years, taking the reserve team to two grand finals – winning one. Afterwards he transferred to Western Australia, coaching Claremont for three years and taking them to one losing Grand Final. Howell then returned to Tasmania for a stint in administration with the Northern Tasmanian Football Association (NTFA in the mid 1970s). He then coached Launceston Football Club for a further two years.

Howell was inducted to the Saints' inaugural Hall of Fame in 2003; the Tasmanian Sporting Hall of Fame in 2013; and inducted into the Australian Football Hall of Fame in 2016. Howell know resides in Mindarie, Western Australia.
