= 1965 VFL season =

69th season of the Victorian Football League (VFL)

1965 VFL premiership season
- Teams: 12
- Premiers: Essendon; 12th premiership
- Minor premiers: St Kilda; 1st minor premiership
- Consolation series: North Melbourne; 1st Consolation series win
- Brownlow Medallist: Ian Stewart (St Kilda); Noel Teasdale (North Melbourne)
- Coleman Medallist: John Peck (Hawthorn)
- Matches played: 112
- Highest: 104,846

The 1965 VFL season was the 69th season of the Victorian Football League (VFL), the highest level senior Australian rules football competition in Victoria. The season featured twelve clubs, ran from 17 April until 25 September, and comprised an 18-game home-and-away season followed by a finals series featuring the top four clubs.

The premiership was won by the Essendon Football Club for the twelfth time, after it defeated St Kilda by 35 points in the 1965 VFL Grand Final.

== Background ==
In 1965, the VFL competition consisted of twelve teams of 18 on-the-field players each, plus two substitute players, known as the 19th man and the 20th man. A player could be substituted for any reason; however, once substituted, a player could not return to the field of play under any circumstances. Teams played each other in a home-and-away season of 18 rounds; matches 12 to 18 were the "home-and-way reverse" of matches 1 to 7. Once the 18 round home-and-away season had finished, the 1965 VFL Premiers were determined by the specific format and conventions of the Page–McIntyre system.

North Melbourne Football Club moved its playing and training base from the Arden Street Oval to Coburg City Oval. The move was intended to be permanent, with some initial negotiations seeking long-term leases for up to 40 years, but it was ultimately cancelled after only eight months, and North Melbourne returned to the Arden Street Oval in 1966.

== Home-and-away season ==
=== Round 1 ===
Home team	Home team score	Away team	Away team score	Venue	Crowd	Date
Fitzroy	8.16 (64)	Essendon	11.18 (84)	Brunswick Street Oval	17,500	17 April 1965
St Kilda	8.12 (60)	Collingwood	8.6 (54)	Moorabbin Oval	51,370	17 April 1965
Hawthorn	8.6 (54)	Carlton	12.19 (91)	Glenferrie Oval	36,000	17 April 1965
North Melbourne	4.12 (36)	South Melbourne	6.10 (46)	City of Coburg Oval	13,774	19 April 1965
Richmond	6.5 (41)	Melbourne	7.5 (47)	MCG	36,283	19 April 1965
Geelong	5.5 (35)	Footscray	5.3 (33)	Kardinia Park	23,233	19 April 1965

=== Round 2 ===
Home team	Home team score	Away team	Away team score	Venue	Crowd	Date
Melbourne	11.14 (80)	North Melbourne	10.12 (72)	MCG	21,744	24 April 1965
Essendon	20.18 (138)	Hawthorn	6.8 (44)	Windy Hill	20,500	24 April 1965
Collingwood	11.13 (79)	Richmond	9.10 (64)	Victoria Park	31,370	24 April 1965
Carlton	8.11 (59)	Geelong	9.11 (65)	Princes Park	34,945	24 April 1965
South Melbourne	7.9 (51)	St Kilda	12.12 (84)	Lake Oval	23,979	24 April 1965
Footscray	8.6 (54)	Fitzroy	9.4 (58)	Western Oval	16,998	24 April 1965

=== Round 3 ===
Home team	Home team score	Away team	Away team score	Venue	Crowd	Date
Richmond	12.13 (85)	St Kilda	14.12 (96)	MCG	43,412	1 May 1965
Fitzroy	9.4 (58)	Melbourne	14.25 (109)	Brunswick Street Oval	15,890	1 May 1965
Collingwood	19.16 (130)	Hawthorn	10.9 (69)	Victoria Park	25,733	1 May 1965
North Melbourne	7.13 (55)	Geelong	14.14 (98)	City of Coburg Oval	17,408	1 May 1965
Footscray	6.12 (48)	Essendon	18.18 (126)	Western Oval	24,365	1 May 1965
South Melbourne	12.14 (86)	Carlton	10.11 (71)	Lake Oval	23,100	1 May 1965

=== Round 4 ===
Home team	Home team score	Away team	Away team score	Venue	Crowd	Date
Melbourne	12.8 (80)	South Melbourne	11.11 (77)	MCG	27,404	8 May 1965
Essendon	10.9 (69)	Richmond	14.9 (93)	Windy Hill	14,500	8 May 1965
Carlton	16.11 (107)	North Melbourne	6.8 (44)	Princes Park	12,728	8 May 1965
St Kilda	14.7 (91)	Footscray	7.8 (50)	Moorabbin Oval	14,454	8 May 1965
Hawthorn	14.14 (98)	Fitzroy	9.7 (61)	Glenferrie Oval	9,000	8 May 1965
Geelong	7.8 (50)	Collingwood	6.9 (45)	Kardinia Park	21,525	8 May 1965

=== Round 5 ===
Home team	Home team score	Away team	Away team score	Venue	Crowd	Date
Geelong	8.7 (55)	Melbourne	10.9 (69)	Kardinia Park	37,774	15 May 1965
Footscray	11.11 (77)	South Melbourne	11.10 (76)	Western Oval	11,253	15 May 1965
Fitzroy	12.9 (81)	North Melbourne	16.13 (109)	Brunswick Street Oval	10,561	15 May 1965
Richmond	14.21 (105)	Hawthorn	8.12 (60)	MCG	32,104	15 May 1965
St Kilda	7.14 (56)	Essendon	14.9 (93)	Moorabbin Oval	39,765	15 May 1965
Collingwood	9.11 (65)	Carlton	13.7 (85)	Victoria Park	37,223	15 May 1965

=== Round 6 ===
Home team	Home team score	Away team	Away team score	Venue	Crowd	Date
North Melbourne	8.10 (58)	St Kilda	14.12 (96)	City of Coburg Oval	13,291	22 May 1965
Fitzroy	8.8 (56)	Geelong	11.21 (87)	Brunswick Street Oval	11,925	22 May 1965
Carlton	8.13 (61)	Richmond	6.9 (45)	Princes Park	29,949	22 May 1965
Hawthorn	12.9 (81)	Footscray	10.14 (74)	Glenferrie Oval	11,800	22 May 1965
South Melbourne	14.12 (96)	Essendon	12.16 (88)	Lake Oval	24,200	22 May 1965
Melbourne	6.13 (49)	Collingwood	7.5 (47)	MCG	56,808	22 May 1965

=== Round 7 ===
Home team	Home team score	Away team	Away team score	Venue	Crowd	Date
Geelong	18.14 (122)	Hawthorn	6.9 (45)	Kardinia Park	19,004	29 May 1965
Footscray	9.11 (65)	Melbourne	10.9 (69)	Western Oval	18,380	29 May 1965
Collingwood	15.11 (101)	South Melbourne	10.12 (72)	Victoria Park	33,452	29 May 1965
Richmond	21.16 (142)	North Melbourne	6.12 (48)	MCG	24,602	29 May 1965
St Kilda	11.18 (84)	Fitzroy	5.5 (35)	Moorabbin Oval	18,670	29 May 1965
Essendon	5.23 (53)	Carlton	10.9 (69)	Windy Hill	35,500	29 May 1965

=== Round 8 ===
Home team	Home team score	Away team	Away team score	Venue	Crowd	Date
Geelong	8.14 (62)	St Kilda	6.7 (43)	Kardinia Park	27,584	5 June 1965
Collingwood	14.12 (96)	Footscray	11.12 (78)	Victoria Park	25,250	5 June 1965
Carlton	6.22 (58)	Melbourne	13.17 (95)	Princes Park	41,561	5 June 1965
South Melbourne	13.24 (102)	Hawthorn	12.19 (91)	Lake Oval	17,400	5 June 1965
Richmond	21.17 (143)	Fitzroy	10.15 (75)	MCG	20,649	5 June 1965
North Melbourne	11.15 (81)	Essendon	13.10 (88)	City of Coburg Oval	12,828	5 June 1965

=== Round 9 ===
Home team	Home team score	Away team	Away team score	Venue	Crowd	Date
Hawthorn	14.10 (94)	North Melbourne	14.13 (97)	Glenferrie Oval	11,000	12 June 1965
South Melbourne	20.9 (129)	Geelong	17.13 (115)	Lake Oval	32,260	12 June 1965
Essendon	7.12 (54)	Collingwood	12.14 (86)	Windy Hill	34,900	12 June 1965
Melbourne	9.7 (61)	St Kilda	18.14 (122)	MCG	72,114	14 June 1965
Footscray	9.11 (65)	Richmond	9.17 (71)	Western Oval	25,345	14 June 1965
Fitzroy	9.7 (61)	Carlton	14.18 (102)	Brunswick Street Oval	20,140	14 June 1965

=== Round 10 ===
Home team	Home team score	Away team	Away team score	Venue	Crowd	Date
Geelong	12.9 (81)	Richmond	9.11 (65)	Kardinia Park	25,350	26 June 1965
Fitzroy	14.16 (100)	South Melbourne	14.10 (94)	Brunswick Street Oval	12,626	26 June 1965
Carlton	12.10 (82)	Footscray	8.10 (58)	Princes Park	19,680	26 June 1965
St Kilda	24.12 (156)	Hawthorn	11.9 (75)	Moorabbin Oval	20,010	26 June 1965
Melbourne	6.6 (42)	Essendon	10.11 (71)	MCG	51,420	26 June 1965
North Melbourne	12.11 (83)	Collingwood	13.12 (90)	City of Coburg Oval	21,626	26 June 1965

=== Round 11 ===
Home team	Home team score	Away team	Away team score	Venue	Crowd	Date
Hawthorn	9.13 (67)	Melbourne	19.11 (125)	Glenferrie Oval	14,900	3 July 1965
Footscray	7.10 (52)	North Melbourne	5.10 (40)	Western Oval	14,150	3 July 1965
St Kilda	12.8 (80)	Carlton	10.14 (74)	Moorabbin Oval	35,794	3 July 1965
Richmond	23.20 (158)	South Melbourne	12.10 (82)	MCG	35,200	10 July 1965
Essendon	12.16 (88)	Geelong	6.9 (45)	Windy Hill	27,000	10 July 1965
Collingwood	10.14 (74)	Fitzroy	4.6 (30)	Victoria Park	20,657	10 July 1965

=== Round 12 ===
Home team	Home team score	Away team	Away team score	Venue	Crowd	Date
Melbourne	9.6 (60)	Richmond	9.12 (66)	MCG	36,830	17 July 1965
Footscray	1.8 (14)	Geelong	5.13 (43)	Western Oval	13,395	17 July 1965
Essendon	12.12 (84)	Fitzroy	3.8 (26)	Windy Hill	10,650	17 July 1965
Collingwood	8.13 (61)	St Kilda	7.5 (47)	Victoria Park	29,357	17 July 1965
Carlton	8.19 (67)	Hawthorn	8.4 (52)	Princes Park	12,791	17 July 1965
South Melbourne	8.8 (56)	North Melbourne	6.17 (53)	Lake Oval	9,520	17 July 1965

=== Round 13 ===
Home team	Home team score	Away team	Away team score	Venue	Crowd	Date
St Kilda	18.9 (117)	South Melbourne	6.12 (48)	Moorabbin Oval	18,709	24 July 1965
Fitzroy	7.13 (55)	Footscray	6.6 (42)	Brunswick Street Oval	7,456	24 July 1965
North Melbourne	11.15 (81)	Melbourne	9.6 (60)	City of Coburg Oval	8,312	24 July 1965
Hawthorn	7.5 (47)	Essendon	10.11 (71)	Glenferrie Oval	11,400	24 July 1965
Richmond	8.8 (56)	Collingwood	12.7 (79)	MCG	56,360	24 July 1965
Geelong	5.9 (39)	Carlton	9.12 (66)	Kardinia Park	19,568	24 July 1965

=== Round 14 ===
Home team	Home team score	Away team	Away team score	Venue	Crowd	Date
Geelong	10.17 (77)	North Melbourne	5.4 (34)	Kardinia Park	19,658	31 July 1965
Essendon	13.18 (96)	Footscray	6.11 (47)	Windy Hill	16,800	31 July 1965
Carlton	9.19 (73)	South Melbourne	13.12 (90)	Princes Park	20,744	31 July 1965
St Kilda	14.12 (96)	Richmond	11.17 (83)	Moorabbin Oval	34,076	31 July 1965
Melbourne	12.11 (83)	Fitzroy	11.15 (81)	MCG	30,381	31 July 1965
Hawthorn	8.12 (60)	Collingwood	12.22 (94)	Glenferrie Oval	18,500	31 July 1965

=== Round 15 ===
Home team	Home team score	Away team	Away team score	Venue	Crowd	Date
Footscray	6.9 (45)	St Kilda	9.15 (69)	Western Oval	11,313	7 August 1965
Fitzroy	4.12 (36)	Hawthorn	8.6 (54)	Brunswick Street Oval	7,463	7 August 1965
Collingwood	14.9 (93)	Geelong	7.4 (46)	Victoria Park	26,915	7 August 1965
South Melbourne	11.12 (78)	Melbourne	5.9 (39)	Lake Oval	15,130	7 August 1965
Richmond	14.10 (94)	Essendon	5.6 (36)	MCG	32,031	7 August 1965
North Melbourne	6.8 (44)	Carlton	5.2 (32)	City of Coburg Oval	11,474	7 August 1965

=== Round 16 ===
Home team	Home team score	Away team	Away team score	Venue	Crowd	Date
Hawthorn	9.14 (68)	Richmond	16.14 (110)	Glenferrie Oval	15,000	14 August 1965
Essendon	9.15 (69)	St Kilda	9.10 (64)	Windy Hill	28,700	14 August 1965
Carlton	11.16 (82)	Collingwood	16.11 (107)	Princes Park	36,730	14 August 1965
Melbourne	11.7 (73)	Geelong	16.11 (107)	MCG	44,753	14 August 1965
South Melbourne	10.18 (78)	Footscray	13.14 (92)	Lake Oval	13,600	14 August 1965
North Melbourne	12.10 (82)	Fitzroy	12.11 (83)	City of Coburg Oval	7,788	14 August 1965

=== Round 17 ===
Home team	Home team score	Away team	Away team score	Venue	Crowd	Date
Footscray	4.17 (41)	Hawthorn	11.6 (72)	Western Oval	10,496	21 August 1965
Essendon	14.13 (97)	South Melbourne	4.7 (31)	Windy Hill	18,950	21 August 1965
Collingwood	14.10 (94)	Melbourne	7.10 (52)	Victoria Park	33,318	21 August 1965
St Kilda	12.13 (85)	North Melbourne	6.12 (48)	Moorabbin Oval	18,704	21 August 1965
Geelong	9.16 (70)	Fitzroy	8.4 (52)	Kardinia Park	15,651	21 August 1965
Richmond	14.8 (92)	Carlton	10.9 (69)	MCG	40,576	21 August 1965

=== Round 18 ===
Home team	Home team score	Away team	Away team score	Venue	Crowd	Date
North Melbourne	11.12 (78)	Richmond	6.12 (48)	City of Coburg Oval	11,867	28 August 1965
Fitzroy	16.6 (102)	St Kilda	19.13 (127)	Brunswick Street Oval	15,782	28 August 1965
Carlton	10.9 (69)	Essendon	9.6 (60)	Princes Park	26,267	28 August 1965
Hawthorn	10.9 (69)	Geelong	17.20 (122)	Glenferrie Oval	15,106	28 August 1965
Melbourne	10.12 (72)	Footscray	10.15 (75)	MCG	19,532	28 August 1965
South Melbourne	13.16 (94)	Collingwood	12.6 (78)	Lake Oval	28,860	28 August 1965

== Ladder ==
(P)	Premiers
	Qualified for finals

#	Team	P	W	L	D	PF	PA	%	Pts
1	St Kilda	18	14	4	0	1573	1154	136.3	56
2	Collingwood	18	13	5	0	1473	1131	130.2	52
3	Geelong	18	13	5	0	1319	1088	121.2	52
4	Essendon (P)	18	12	6	0	1465	1102	132.9	48
5	Richmond	18	10	8	0	1561	1249	125.0	40
6	Carlton	18	10	8	0	1317	1190	110.7	40
7	Melbourne	18	10	8	0	1265	1315	96.2	40
8	South Melbourne	18	9	9	0	1386	1550	89.4	36
9	North Melbourne	18	5	13	0	1143	1415	80.8	20
10	Footscray	18	4	14	0	1010	1310	77.1	16
11	Fitzroy	18	4	14	0	1114	1580	70.5	16
12	Hawthorn	18	4	14	0	1200	1742	68.9	16

Rules for classification: 1. premiership points; 2. percentage; 3. points for
Average score: 73.3
Source: AFL Tables

== Finals series ==
=== Semi-finals ===
Team	1 Qtr	2 Qtr	3 Qtr	Final
Geelong	2.0	4.3	6.8	7.9 (51)
Essendon	3.5	8.14	10.16	14.19 (103)
Attendance: 89,833

Team	1 Qtr	2 Qtr	3 Qtr	Final
St Kilda	2.7	6.14	11.22	13.24 (102)
Collingwood	5.5	8.7	11.10	14.17 (101)
Attendance: 98,385

=== Preliminary final ===
Team	1 Qtr	2 Qtr	3 Qtr	Final
Collingwood	1.0	3.0	4.4	6.6 (42)
Essendon	3.6	5.9	10.10	14.13 (97)
Attendance: 95,386

=== Grand final ===
Team	1 Qtr	2 Qtr	3 Qtr	Final
St Kilda	1.6	4.8	5.11	9.16 (70)
Essendon	2.7	5.10	10.18	14.21 (105)
Attendance: 104,846

== Night Series Competition ==
The night series were held under the floodlights at Lake Oval, South Melbourne, for the teams (5th to 12th on ladder) out of the finals at the end of the season.

Final: North Melbourne 14.13 (97) defeated Carlton 9.3 (57).

== Season notes ==
- Melbourne's 1964 premiership captain Ron Barassi was cleared to Carlton as captain/coach, one of the most significant player transfers in the Coulter Law era.
- Three teams moved their home grounds in 1965:
  - St Kilda moved its training and playing base from Junction Oval to Moorabbin Oval, after signing a 75-year lease with the Moorabbin Council in June 1964.
  - Richmond moved its home ground for matches to the Melbourne Cricket Ground, sharing it with Melbourne, while continuing to train at the Punt Road Oval, because roadwork to widen Punt Road was going to significantly reduce Punt Road Oval's capacity.
  - North Melbourne moved its training and playing base from Arden Street Oval to Coburg City Oval, after signing a seven-year lease with the Coburg Council in April 1965. The move was not successful for either party, and the club returned to Arden Street Oval in 1966.
- In the Round 2 match against Essendon, Hawthorn forward Garry Young sustained a painful injury from a hard knock. Hawthorn captain Graham Arthur stood over him and said "Get up you weak bastard", and Young returned to the play and did his best to continue. Eventually he left the ground and went to hospital where it was discovered that he had a perforated bowel and peritonitis, both of which are life-threatening conditions. He never played again.
- In Round 6, Essendon forward Geoff Gosper was the first VFL player to play with a mouthguard.
- Victoria played two interstate matches against South Australia during the season. On Saturday 19 June, at the Melbourne Cricket Ground, Victoria won 19.17 (131) to 9.18 (72); on 10 July, in Adelaide, South Australia won 12.11 (83) to 3.1 (19).
- After opening the season with eight consecutive wins, Melbourne fell to 9–3 after Round 12, then sacked coach Norm Smith. He was reinstated before Round 14, but Smith had also been unhappy about his lack of support from the Melbourne Football Club in the libel case that had been brought against him by VFL umpire Don Blew in the late 1964. The sacking is said to have given rise to a sports curse, which saw Melbourne miss the finals for the first time since 1953 (after a twelve-year period under Smith which had netted six premierships), fail to reach another finals series until 1987, and fail to win another premiership until 2021.
- St Kilda played in a Grand Final for the first time since 1913.
- Essendon's half-forward flanker John Somerville was felled behind play in first 10 minutes of the 1965 Preliminary Final. His opponent for the day, Collingwood's Duncan Wright, was never selected to play for Collingwood again. The field umpire, Ron Brophy, was never selected to umpire a VFL match again. (See Duncan Wright and John Somerville.)

== Awards ==
- The 1965 VFL Premiership team was Essendon.
- Hawthorn won the "wooden spoon" for 1965. As of 2024, this remains the club's latest wooden spoon.
- The VFL's leading goalkicker was John Peck of Hawthorn who kicked 56 goals; he was the third player to win the goalkicking when his team won the "wooden spoon", the first since Roy Park of University in 1913 and the last until Brendan Fevola in 2006.
- The winner of the 1965 Brownlow Medal was Ian Stewart of St Kilda with 20 votes; he won on a count-back from Noel Teasdale of North Melbourne.
  - As a consequence of its 1981 decision to change its rules relating to tied Brownlow Medal contests, the AFL awarded a retrospective medal to Teasdale in 1989.
- The reserves premiership was won by Collingwood. Collingwood 16.9 (105) defeated Geelong 10.20 (80) in the Grand Final, held as a curtain-raiser to the seniors Grand Final at the Melbourne Cricket Ground on 25 September.

== Sources ==
- 1965 VFL season at AFL Tables
- 1965 VFL season at Australian Football
