= 1960 VFL season =

64th season of the Victorian Football League (VFL)

1960 VFL premiership season
- Teams: 12
- Premiers: Melbourne; 11th premiership
- Minor premiers: Melbourne; 8th minor premiership
- Consolation series: South Melbourne; 3rd Consolation series win
- Brownlow Medallist: John Schultz (Footscray)
- Coleman Medallist: Ron Evans (Essendon)
- Matches played: 112
- Highest: 97,457

The 1960 VFL season was the 64th season of the Victorian Football League (VFL), the highest level senior Australian rules football competition in Victoria. The season featured twelve clubs, ran from 16 April until 24 September, and comprised an 18-game home-and-away season followed by a finals series featuring the top four clubs.

The premiership was won by the Melbourne Football Club for the eleventh time and second time consecutively, after it defeated Collingwood by 48 points in the 1960 VFL Grand Final.

== Background ==
In 1960, the VFL competition consisted of twelve teams of 18 on-the-field players each, plus two substitute players, known as the 19th man and the 20th man. A player could be substituted for any reason; however, once substituted, a player could not return to the field of play under any circumstances. Teams played each other in a home-and-away season of 18 rounds; matches 12 to 18 were the "home-and-way reverse" of matches 1 to 7. Once the 18 round home-and-away season had finished, the 1960 VFL Premiers were determined by the specific format and conventions of the Page–McIntyre system.

Round 1 of the 1960 competition was played over Easter long weekend, with three matches on Easter Saturday (16 April) and three matches on Easter Monday (18 April). Round 2 of the competition was also scheduled for a long weekend, with four matches scheduled for the Saturday (23 April) and two for the Monday (Anzac Day, 25 April).

The four matches on Saturday 23 April were postponed because of the extremely wet conditions. Despite pressure from the Victorian Premier, Henry Bolte, the VFL refused to play the four postponed matches on Anzac Day (which, by custom, would have contributed to patriotic funds), and scheduled the postponed matches for the following Saturday (30 April). As a consequence of this delay all of the season's matches from Round 3 to the Grand Final were played a week later than had been originally scheduled.

== Home-and-away season ==
=== Round 1 ===
Home team	Home team score	Away team	Away team score	Venue	Crowd	Date
Essendon	12.21 (93)	Hawthorn	9.12 (66)	Windy Hill	23,000	16 April 1960
Collingwood	11.14 (80)	Fitzroy	3.7 (25)	Victoria Park	39,927	16 April 1960
South Melbourne	17.12 (114)	St Kilda	8.15 (63)	Lake Oval	28,100	16 April 1960
Melbourne	14.15 (99)	North Melbourne	5.14 (44)	MCG	36,966	18 April 1960
Footscray	15.7 (97)	Geelong	10.6 (66)	Western Oval	24,982	18 April 1960
Carlton	14.14 (98)	Richmond	14.14 (98)	Princes Park	31,000	18 April 1960

=== Round 2 ===
Home team	Home team score	Away team	Away team score	Venue	Crowd	Date
St Kilda	5.18 (48)	Melbourne	10.12 (72)	Junction Oval	30,000	25 April 1960
Fitzroy	9.17 (71)	Carlton	9.10 (64)	Brunswick Street Oval	33,815	25 April 1960
Geelong	20.14 (134)	South Melbourne	14.6 (90)	Kardinia Park	16,370	30 April 1960
North Melbourne	6.17 (53)	Footscray	14.15 (99)	Arden Street Oval	20,150	30 April 1960
Richmond	5.15 (45)	Essendon	25.20 (170)	Punt Road Oval	31,000	30 April 1960
Hawthorn	6.16 (52)	Collingwood	7.13 (55)	Glenferrie Oval	30,000	30 April 1960

=== Round 3 ===
Home team	Home team score	Away team	Away team score	Venue	Crowd	Date
North Melbourne	5.12 (42)	Richmond	3.8 (26)	Arden Street Oval	9,000	7 May 1960
Melbourne	16.14 (110)	South Melbourne	6.10 (46)	MCG	23,135	7 May 1960
Fitzroy	5.11 (41)	Geelong	8.7 (55)	Brunswick Street Oval	13,802	7 May 1960
Hawthorn	6.9 (45)	Footscray	6.17 (53)	Glenferrie Oval	16,000	7 May 1960
Essendon	11.10 (76)	Collingwood	11.8 (74)	Windy Hill	30,000	7 May 1960
St Kilda	5.11 (41)	Carlton	7.3 (45)	Junction Oval	18,700	7 May 1960

=== Round 4 ===
Home team	Home team score	Away team	Away team score	Venue	Crowd	Date
Geelong	4.14 (38)	St Kilda	9.5 (59)	Kardinia Park	12,795	14 May 1960
Collingwood	7.13 (55)	Melbourne	2.7 (19)	Victoria Park	28,263	14 May 1960
Carlton	5.18 (48)	Hawthorn	5.7 (37)	Princes Park	11,066	14 May 1960
South Melbourne	11.12 (78)	North Melbourne	5.8 (38)	Lake Oval	7,000	14 May 1960
Richmond	5.6 (36)	Fitzroy	6.11 (47)	Punt Road Oval	7,500	14 May 1960
Footscray	4.2 (26)	Essendon	4.11 (35)	Western Oval	24,302	14 May 1960

=== Round 5 ===
Home team	Home team score	Away team	Away team score	Venue	Crowd	Date
Richmond	7.5 (47)	South Melbourne	4.7 (31)	Punt Road Oval	12,500	21 May 1960
Hawthorn	5.7 (37)	Melbourne	7.15 (57)	Glenferrie Oval	12,500	21 May 1960
Fitzroy	11.9 (75)	Footscray	5.6 (36)	Brunswick Street Oval	17,102	21 May 1960
North Melbourne	10.6 (66)	Geelong	7.9 (51)	Arden Street Oval	8,500	21 May 1960
St Kilda	5.9 (39)	Collingwood	4.13 (37)	Junction Oval	28,600	21 May 1960
Essendon	17.13 (115)	Carlton	11.14 (80)	Windy Hill	26,300	21 May 1960

=== Round 6 ===
Home team	Home team score	Away team	Away team score	Venue	Crowd	Date
Melbourne	17.22 (124)	Richmond	4.8 (32)	MCG	27,249	28 May 1960
Footscray	6.11 (47)	St Kilda	10.5 (65)	Western Oval	22,126	28 May 1960
North Melbourne	7.6 (48)	Hawthorn	9.8 (62)	Arden Street Oval	8,600	28 May 1960
Fitzroy	8.7 (55)	Essendon	6.14 (50)	Brunswick Street Oval	25,632	28 May 1960
South Melbourne	12.8 (80)	Collingwood	11.12 (78)	Lake Oval	27,000	28 May 1960
Geelong	17.17 (119)	Carlton	10.14 (74)	Kardinia Park	16,589	28 May 1960

=== Round 7 ===
Home team	Home team score	Away team	Away team score	Venue	Crowd	Date
Essendon	9.15 (69)	Melbourne	10.11 (71)	Windy Hill	32,500	4 June 1960
Collingwood	12.16 (88)	North Melbourne	16.8 (104)	Victoria Park	23,740	4 June 1960
Carlton	11.13 (79)	South Melbourne	13.13 (91)	Princes Park	24,465	4 June 1960
Hawthorn	14.15 (99)	Geelong	14.13 (97)	Glenferrie Oval	16,500	4 June 1960
Richmond	6.13 (49)	Footscray	11.15 (81)	Punt Road Oval	16,000	4 June 1960
St Kilda	13.12 (90)	Fitzroy	9.12 (66)	Junction Oval	26,250	4 June 1960

=== Round 8 ===
Home team	Home team score	Away team	Away team score	Venue	Crowd	Date
North Melbourne	13.12 (90)	St Kilda	13.14 (92)	Arden Street Oval	17,500	11 June 1960
Hawthorn	13.18 (96)	Richmond	11.15 (81)	Glenferrie Oval	12,000	11 June 1960
Melbourne	10.15 (75)	Footscray	6.8 (44)	MCG	35,539	11 June 1960
South Melbourne	13.12 (90)	Fitzroy	13.13 (91)	Lake Oval	21,500	11 June 1960
Geelong	11.17 (83)	Essendon	14.10 (94)	Kardinia Park	24,119	11 June 1960
Collingwood	16.14 (110)	Carlton	10.13 (73)	Victoria Park	29,853	11 June 1960

=== Round 9 ===
Home team	Home team score	Away team	Away team score	Venue	Crowd	Date
Fitzroy	10.8 (68)	Melbourne	16.14 (110)	Brunswick Street Oval	23,233	18 June 1960
Essendon	13.10 (88)	South Melbourne	12.15 (87)	Windy Hill	21,000	18 June 1960
Carlton	18.12 (120)	North Melbourne	8.15 (63)	Princes Park	13,897	18 June 1960
St Kilda	7.13 (55)	Hawthorn	8.19 (67)	Junction Oval	23,900	18 June 1960
Richmond	11.17 (83)	Geelong	12.11 (83)	Punt Road Oval	13,000	18 June 1960
Footscray	8.19 (67)	Collingwood	10.14 (74)	Western Oval	28,098	18 June 1960

=== Round 10 ===
Home team	Home team score	Away team	Away team score	Venue	Crowd	Date
Geelong	6.5 (41)	Melbourne	12.11 (83)	Kardinia Park	17,934	25 June 1960
Carlton	11.14 (80)	Footscray	7.8 (50)	Princes Park	26,979	25 June 1960
South Melbourne	11.7 (73)	Hawthorn	13.6 (84)	Lake Oval	22,300	25 June 1960
Fitzroy	20.10 (130)	North Melbourne	15.18 (108)	Brunswick Street Oval	15,747	2 July 1960
Essendon	12.4 (76)	St Kilda	10.14 (74)	Windy Hill	25,700	2 July 1960
Richmond	12.12 (84)	Collingwood	14.13 (97)	Punt Road Oval	28,000	2 July 1960

=== Round 11 ===
Home team	Home team score	Away team	Away team score	Venue	Crowd	Date
Footscray	7.12 (54)	South Melbourne	8.9 (57)	Western Oval	15,322	9 July 1960
Collingwood	13.16 (94)	Geelong	10.13 (73)	Victoria Park	20,915	9 July 1960
St Kilda	14.15 (99)	Richmond	4.18 (42)	Junction Oval	16,500	9 July 1960
Hawthorn	10.9 (69)	Fitzroy	12.14 (86)	Glenferrie Oval	18,000	9 July 1960
North Melbourne	12.11 (83)	Essendon	14.14 (98)	Arden Street Oval	15,000	9 July 1960
Melbourne	9.17 (71)	Carlton	6.22 (58)	MCG	29,741	9 July 1960

=== Round 12 ===
Home team	Home team score	Away team	Away team score	Venue	Crowd	Date
St Kilda	11.13 (79)	South Melbourne	9.3 (57)	Junction Oval	24,700	16 July 1960
North Melbourne	9.19 (73)	Melbourne	15.13 (103)	Arden Street Oval	9,600	16 July 1960
Geelong	11.13 (79)	Footscray	8.4 (52)	Kardinia Park	14,388	16 July 1960
Hawthorn	10.13 (73)	Essendon	16.11 (107)	Glenferrie Oval	23,500	16 July 1960
Fitzroy	17.10 (112)	Collingwood	13.18 (96)	Brunswick Street Oval	30,080	16 July 1960
Richmond	8.8 (56)	Carlton	15.20 (110)	Punt Road Oval	13,500	16 July 1960

=== Round 13 ===
Home team	Home team score	Away team	Away team score	Venue	Crowd	Date
Melbourne	6.13 (49)	St Kilda	6.9 (45)	MCG	42,935	23 July 1960
Footscray	9.10 (64)	North Melbourne	9.8 (62)	Western Oval	14,133	23 July 1960
Essendon	16.16 (112)	Richmond	10.10 (70)	Windy Hill	17,000	23 July 1960
Collingwood	7.15 (57)	Hawthorn	7.16 (58)	Victoria Park	18,637	23 July 1960
Carlton	5.10 (40)	Fitzroy	12.12 (84)	Princes Park	26,796	23 July 1960
South Melbourne	10.20 (80)	Geelong	11.13 (79)	Lake Oval	8,350	23 July 1960

=== Round 14 ===
Home team	Home team score	Away team	Away team score	Venue	Crowd	Date
Footscray	5.9 (39)	Hawthorn	9.21 (75)	Western Oval	16,794	30 July 1960
Collingwood	9.11 (65)	Essendon	6.9 (45)	Victoria Park	39,110	30 July 1960
Carlton	10.12 (72)	St Kilda	11.17 (83)	Princes Park	24,684	30 July 1960
Richmond	9.13 (67)	North Melbourne	12.7 (79)	Punt Road Oval	8,500	30 July 1960
South Melbourne	10.10 (70)	Melbourne	16.13 (109)	Lake Oval	18,000	30 July 1960
Geelong	7.11 (53)	Fitzroy	14.11 (95)	Kardinia Park	15,022	30 July 1960

=== Round 15 ===
Home team	Home team score	Away team	Away team score	Venue	Crowd	Date
North Melbourne	14.16 (100)	South Melbourne	9.20 (74)	Arden Street Oval	10,000	6 August 1960
Fitzroy	13.13 (91)	Richmond	10.11 (71)	Brunswick Street Oval	14,232	6 August 1960
Essendon	14.11 (95)	Footscray	8.10 (58)	Windy Hill	21,000	6 August 1960
St Kilda	9.16 (70)	Geelong	13.9 (87)	Junction Oval	16,300	6 August 1960
Melbourne	16.15 (111)	Collingwood	9.11 (65)	MCG	81,099	6 August 1960
Hawthorn	13.10 (88)	Carlton	9.7 (61)	Glenferrie Oval	16,000	6 August 1960

=== Round 16 ===
Home team	Home team score	Away team	Away team score	Venue	Crowd	Date
Geelong	10.14 (74)	North Melbourne	4.10 (34)	Kardinia Park	9,445	13 August 1960
Collingwood	8.12 (60)	St Kilda	7.7 (49)	Victoria Park	22,640	13 August 1960
Carlton	7.15 (57)	Essendon	6.8 (44)	Princes Park	16,291	13 August 1960
South Melbourne	13.13 (91)	Richmond	7.12 (54)	Lake Oval	6,109	13 August 1960
Melbourne	9.13 (67)	Hawthorn	11.10 (76)	MCG	24,646	13 August 1960
Footscray	4.6 (30)	Fitzroy	7.11 (53)	Western Oval	12,013	13 August 1960

=== Round 17 ===
Home team	Home team score	Away team	Away team score	Venue	Crowd	Date
Hawthorn	9.17 (71)	North Melbourne	8.4 (52)	Glenferrie Oval	13,000	20 August 1960
Essendon	9.7 (61)	Fitzroy	10.12 (72)	Windy Hill	29,500	20 August 1960
Collingwood	8.3 (51)	South Melbourne	5.9 (39)	Victoria Park	22,267	20 August 1960
Carlton	9.12 (66)	Geelong	5.6 (36)	Princes Park	17,100	20 August 1960
Richmond	9.14 (68)	Melbourne	8.12 (60)	Punt Road Oval	8,000	20 August 1960
St Kilda	9.9 (63)	Footscray	6.15 (51)	Junction Oval	16,100	20 August 1960

=== Round 18 ===
Home team	Home team score	Away team	Away team score	Venue	Crowd	Date
Geelong	9.9 (63)	Hawthorn	14.12 (96)	Kardinia Park	14,857	27 August 1960
Footscray	18.9 (117)	Richmond	11.11 (77)	Western Oval	12,419	27 August 1960
Fitzroy	9.16 (70)	St Kilda	6.9 (45)	Brunswick Street Oval	19,507	27 August 1960
Melbourne	10.5 (65)	Essendon	10.18 (78)	MCG	50,274	27 August 1960
North Melbourne	6.8 (44)	Collingwood	11.12 (78)	Arden Street Oval	27,000	27 August 1960
South Melbourne	8.8 (56)	Carlton	11.9 (75)	Lake Oval	11,000	27 August 1960

== Ladder ==
(P)	Premiers
	Qualified for finals

#	Team	P	W	L	D	PF	PA	%	Pts
1	Melbourne (P)	18	14	4	0	1455	1017	143.1	56
2	Fitzroy	18	14	4	0	1332	1184	112.5	56
3	Essendon	18	13	5	0	1506	1204	125.1	52
4	Collingwood	18	11	7	0	1314	1150	114.3	44
5	Hawthorn	18	11	7	0	1251	1192	104.9	44
6	St Kilda	18	9	9	0	1159	1140	101.7	36
7	Carlton	18	8	9	1	1300	1313	99.0	34
8	South Melbourne	18	7	11	0	1304	1413	92.3	28
9	Geelong	18	6	11	1	1311	1373	95.5	26
10	Footscray	18	6	12	0	1065	1178	90.4	24
11	North Melbourne	18	5	13	0	1183	1474	80.3	20
12	Richmond	18	2	14	2	1086	1628	66.7	12

Rules for classification: 1. premiership points; 2. percentage; 3. points for
Average score: 70.7
Source: AFL Tables

== Finals series ==
=== Semi-finals ===
Team	1 Qtr	2 Qtr	3 Qtr	Final
Essendon	2.6	6.9	7.13	7.15 (57)
Collingwood	2.7	5.9	6.12	9.12 (66)
Attendance: 81,209

=== Second Semi-Final ===
Team	1 Qtr	2 Qtr	3 Qtr	Final
Melbourne	3.6	6.12	11.15	14.18 (102)
Fitzroy	1.2	2.6	2.12	4.16 (40)
Attendance: 79,796

Team	1 Qtr	2 Qtr	3 Qtr	Final
Fitzroy	2.2	7.3	8.7	8.12 (60)
Collingwood	2.1	6.4	7.5	9.11 (65)
Attendance: 65,301

=== Grand final ===
Team	1 Qtr	2 Qtr	3 Qtr	Final
Melbourne	4.3	5.5	7.12	8.14 (62)
Collingwood	0.0	1.0	2.0	2.2 (14)
Attendance: 97,457

== Consolation Night Series Competition ==
The night series were held under the floodlights at Lake Oval, South Melbourne, for the teams (5th to 12th on ladder) out of the finals at the end of the season.

Final: South Melbourne 10.12 (70) defeated Hawthorn 8.11 (59)

== Season notes ==
- From 1960, the Seconds became known as the VFL Reserves; and, the Thirds became known as the Under 19s.
- The VFL started fixing the schedule from 1960 such that neither Collingwood and Fitzroy, nor Carlton and North Melbourne played home matches on the same day, due to the heavy transport and labour burden associated with running the two nearby venues at the same time. This practice was already established for two other pairs of teams: St Kilda and South Melbourne, and Melbourne and Richmond.
- John Kennedy took over as coach of Hawthorn. The flamboyant Hawthorn centreman, Brendan Edwards, at the time a physical education teacher at the junior school of the nearby Swinburne Technical College, introduced circuit training.
- In the Round 3 match between Hawthorn and Footscray at Glenferrie Oval, Footscray defeated Hawthorn 6.17 (53) to 6.9 (45). The match was so affected by the strong wind conditions and, especially, the defensive play of the Hawthorn back-line – at a time when one could kick the ball out of bounds on the full without penalty – that the prescribed playing time of 100 minutes was extended by an astonishing 32 minutes and 33 seconds of time-on, including 10 minutes 46 seconds in the first quarter alone.
- Round 4, amidst an extremely wet late autumn with 275 millimetres or 10.8 inches of rain in Melbourne between 21 April and 21 May, remains the lowest-scoring round in League history since 1919, with an average score of merely 5.13 (43) and an aggregate of just 516 points.
- In Round 13, Hawthorn defeated Collingwood at Victoria Park for the first time; Hawthorn had lost the previous 28 meetings at Victoria Park. Full forward John Peck marked on the final siren and kicked a goal to give Hawthorn the win by a point.
- The Brownlow Medal was won by Footscray's ruckman John Schultz. Schultz was the second of the only two amateur players to win the Brownlow Medal; the first had been Melbourne's Don Cordner, also a ruckman, in 1946.
- Former classmates at Caulfield Grammar School, John Schultz and Ron Evans, won the Brownlow Medal and topped the VFL Goalkicking List respectively in the same VFL season.
- Melbourne played in its seventh successive Grand Final, thrashing Collingwood 8.14 (62) to 2.2 (14). Collingwood's score was its lowest since Round 5, 1900, and the lowest by any team in a Grand Final since 1927.
- At the end of the 1960 season, the VFL estimated that the live telecast of the last quarter of three VFL matches each Saturday afternoon had cost at least 245,000 spectators, and the VFL decided to discontinue this practice (which had been introduced in 1957).

== Awards ==
- The 1960 VFL Premiership team was Melbourne.
- The VFL's leading goalkicker was Ron Evans of Essendon who kicked 67 goals.
- The winner of the 1960 Brownlow Medal was John Schultz of Footscray with 20 votes.
- Richmond took the "wooden spoon" in 1960.
- The reserves premiership was won by Geelong. Geelong 7.15 (57) defeated Hawthorn 7.10 (52) in the Grand Final, held as a curtain raiser to the seniors Grand Final on 24 September.

== Sources ==
- 1960 VFL season at AFL Tables
- 1960 VFL season at Australian Football
