= 1953 VFL grand final =

Grand final of the 1953 Victorian Football League season

1953 VFL Grand Final

Geelong	Collingwood
8.17 (65)	11.11 (77)
	1	2	3	4
GEE	2.3 (15)	3.9 (27)	5.11 (41)	8.17 (65)
COL	2.4 (16)	5.6 (36)	10.10 (70)	11.11 (77)
- Date: 26 September 1953
- Stadium: Melbourne Cricket Ground
- Attendance: 89,149

The 1953 VFL Grand Final was an Australian rules football game contested between the Geelong Football Club and Collingwood Football Club, held at the Melbourne Cricket Ground on 26 September 1953. It was the 56th annual Grand Final of the Victorian Football League, staged to determine the premiers for the 1953 VFL season. The match, attended by 89,149 spectators, was won by Collingwood by 12 points, the club's 12th premiership victory.

This was the third successive Grand Final appearance for the Cats, who were attempting to win three successive flags after having defeated Essendon in the 1951 VFL Grand Final and Collingwood in the 1952 VFL Grand Final. Collingwood had not won a premiership since winning the 1936 VFL Grand Final.

In round 14 of the 1953 season, Collingwood defeated Geelong to end their record 23 game winning streak (26 games unbeaten). Collingwood won again when the sides battled in the Semi Final, and in the Grand Final defeated Geelong for the third time in the year. Geelong had the better of the final quarter, but inaccuracy cost them.

Collingwood's full-back Jack Hamilton and Geelong's dual premiership player Russell Middlemiss missed the game through injury.

== Teams ==
Collingwood	Geelong

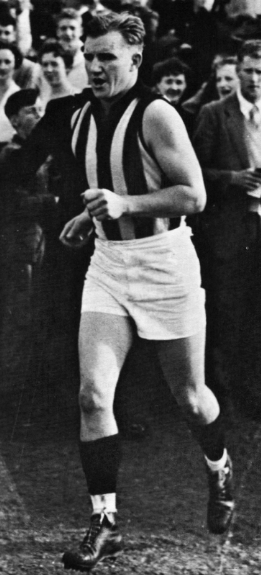
Bob Rose

Collingwood
B:	Lerrel Sharp	Jack Finck	Arthur Gooch
HB:	Jack Parker	Neville Waller	Ron Kingston
C:	Des Healey	Bill Twomey, Jr.	Ron Richards
HF:	Pat Twomey	Terry Waites	Thorold Merrett
F:	Mick Twomey	Keith Batchelor	Lou Richards (c)
Foll:	Neil Mann	Bill Rose	Bob Rose
Res:	Murray Weideman	George Hams	
Coach:	Phonse Kyne		

Geelong
B:	Bernie Smith	Bruce Morrison	Harry Herbert
HB:	Sid Smith	John Hyde	Geoff Williams
C:	Les Reed	Leo Turner	Bert Worner
HF:	Noel Rayson	Fred Flanagan (c)	Bob Davis
F:	George Swarbrick	Russell Renfrey	Neil Trezise
Foll:	Bill McMaster	Norm Sharp	Peter Pianto
Res:	Doug Palmer	Ron Hovey	
Coach:	Reg Hickey		

== The game ==
=== 1st quarter ===
The game opened with the large crowd spilling out onto the oval and forming a human boundary line; these people got to see a Collingwood side that were more determined to get to the ball first and run their Geelong opponents off their feet. It was a tight first term in which the Magpies didn't allow the Cats to play their usual dominant game. A few fiery incidents occurred, but Umpire McMurray was soon on top of it.

=== 2nd quarter ===
The second quarter was a microcosm of the game: Geelong were wasteful in front of goal, whereas the Collingwood team, with Batchelor and Rose, were accurate. Three goals to one gave the Magpies a handy lead going into half time.

=== 3rd quarter ===
Collingwood set up the win in the third quarter by kicking 5 goals to 2. Geelong's ruckman Bill McMaster was carried from the field, and the Cats had to play Renfrey on the ball. This left a hole in the Geelong's attack that the Magpies exploited and resulted in coast-to-coast goals.

=== Final quarter ===
With Collingwood slowing to a walk, Geelong challenged hard to make up the gap. Geelong peppered the goals but could only manage 1 goal from 8 attempts. Hovey, who replaced McMaster, had two chances from 20 metres and missed both. A goal against play by Collingwood's Rose put the result out of reach of the Cats. Two late goals to Geelong were not enough to stop Collingwood winning their twelfth pennant.

== Statistics ==
=== Best ===
Collingwood

- Mann, Healey, R. Richards, R. Rose, Finck, Merrett

Geelong

- B. Smith, Williams, Morrison, Turner, Davis, Renfrey

=== Goalkickers ===
Collingwood

- Batchelor 4, Bob Rose 3, Healey 2, L. Richards, M. Twomey

Geelong

- Davis 3, Rayson 2, Hovey, McMaster, Trezise

=== Free kicks ===
- Collingwood 14, 4, 11, 2 total 31
- Geelong 15, 7, 5, 4 total 31

=== Marks ===
- Collingwood 61
- Geelong 49

=== Attendance ===
- MCG crowd – 89,149

== See also ==
- George Goninon
