= 1952 VFL grand final =

Grand final of the 1952 Victorian Football League season

1952 VFL Grand Final

Geelong	Collingwood
13.8 (86)	5.10 (40)
	1	2	3	4
GEE	4.2 (26)	5.3 (33)	11.6 (72)	13.8 (86)
COL	1.1 (7)	3.3 (21)	5.3 (33)	5.10 (40)
- Date: 27 September 1952
- Stadium: Melbourne Cricket Ground
- Attendance: 82,890

The 1952 VFL Grand Final was an Australian rules football game contested between the Geelong Football Club and Collingwood Football Club, held at the Melbourne Cricket Ground on 27 September 1952. It was the 55th annual Grand Final of the Victorian Football League, staged to determine the premiers for the 1952 VFL season. The match, attended by 81,304 spectators, was won by Geelong by 46 points, marking that club's fifth premiership victory and second in succession.

== Teams ==
Geelong	Collingwood

Geelong
B:	Bernie Smith	Bruce Morrison	Norm Sharp
HB:	Russell Middlemiss	John Hyde	Geoff Williams
C:	Bert Worner	Doug Palmer	Terry Fulton
HF:	Bob Davis	Fred Flanagan (c)	Leo Turner
F:	Jim Norman	George Goninon	Peter Pianto
Foll:	Bill McMaster	Russell Renfrey	Neil Trezise
Res:	Sid Smith	Ron Hovey	
Coach:	Reg Hickey		

Collingwood
B:	George Hams	Keith Batchelor	Bill Rose
HB:	Les Smith	Jack Finck	Frank Tuck
C:	Thorold Merrett	Bill Twomey, Jr.	Des Healey
HF:	Jack Hickey	Maurie Dunstan	Bob Rose
F:	Jack Parker	Harvey Stevens	Neil Mann
Foll:	Mick Twomey	Arthur Gooch	Lou Richards (c)
Res:	Ron Kingston	Ken Aitken	
Coach:	Phonse Kyne		

Umpire – James Jamieson

== The game ==
Geelong entered the game as the hottest favourites in many a year. The Cats were in the middle of their record winning run and had thrashed Collingwood in the Second Semi final. Collingwood entered the grand final with two changes forced by injuries to Lucas and Pat Twomey. In to the side was Les Smith, Harvey Stevens and Keith Batchelor who made his debut at full back.

=== 1st quarter ===
Collingwood got the first goal of the game from a drop kick from Thorold Merrett. Geelong then got in their stride and kicked the next four goals.

=== 2nd quarter ===
Parker got Collingwood's only goal of the quarter and there vigor was having a negative effect of the Cats. Geelong finally got a goal in time on to go into the break with a twelve point lead.

=== 3rd quarter ===
It took until the halfway mark of the third before Geelong finally decided enough was enough and in a blitz added five goals to finish the quarter with a 39 point lead.

=== 4th quarter ===
With the game out of reach the Magpies attacked constantly for little reward, seven behinds from their slow, lumbering forwards. Geelong on the other hand eased off but still kicked two goals to defeat the Magpies by 46 points.

== Statistics ==
=== Score ===
Team	1 Qtr	2 Qtr	3 Qtr	Final
Geelong	4.2 (26)	5.3 (33)	11.6 (72)	13.8 (86)
Collingwood	1.1 (7)	3.3 (21)	5.3 (33)	5.10 (40)
Attendance: 82,890

=== Goalkickers ===
Geelong:

- Goninon 5, Trezise 4, Davis, Flanagan, McMaster, Worner

Collingwood:

- Parker 3, Merrett 2

=== Best ===
Geelong:

- Williams, Goninon, Sharp, Trezise, B. Smith, Morrison, Flanagan, Worner

Collingwood:

- Merrett, Mann, R. Rose, Tuck, M. Twomey, P. Twomey, Dunstan

== See also ==
- 1952 VFL season
