= 1954 VFL season =

58th season of the Victorian Football League (VFL)

1954 VFL premiership season
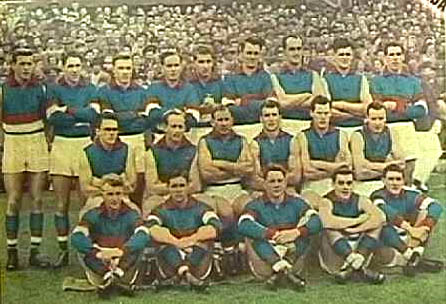
- Footscray team, premiers
- Teams: 12
- Premiers: Footscray; 1st premiership
- Minor premiers: Geelong; 9th minor premiership
- Brownlow Medallist: Roy Wright (Richmond)
- Leading goalkicker medallist: Jack Collins (Footscray)
- Matches played: 112
- Highest: 80,897

The 1954 VFL season was the 58th season of the Victorian Football League (VFL), the highest level senior Australian rules football competition in Victoria. The season featured twelve clubs, ran from 17 April until 25 September, and comprised an 18-game home-and-away season followed by a finals series featuring the top four clubs.

The premiership was won by the Footscray Football Club for the first time, after it defeated Melbourne by 51 points in the 1954 VFL Grand Final.

== Background ==
In 1954, the VFL competition consisted of twelve teams of 18 on-the-field players each, plus two substitute players, known as the 19th man and the 20th man. A player could be substituted for any reason; however, once substituted, a player could not return to the field of play under any circumstances.

Teams played each other in a home-and-away season of 18 rounds; matches 12 to 18 were the "home-and-way reverse" of matches 1 to 7.

Once the 18 round home-and-away season had finished, the 1954 VFL Premiers were determined by the specific format and conventions of the Page–McIntyre system.

== Home-and-away season ==
=== Round 1 ===
Home team	Home team score	Away team	Away team score	Venue	Crowd	Date
Footscray	7.11 (53)	St Kilda	9.10 (64)	Western Oval	24,000	17 April 1954
Fitzroy	7.16 (58)	Geelong	19.16 (130)	Brunswick Street Oval	27,000	17 April 1954
South Melbourne	11.18 (84)	Carlton	11.13 (79)	Lake Oval	38,000	17 April 1954
North Melbourne	15.11 (101)	Richmond	13.14 (92)	Arden Street Oval	24,000	19 April 1954
Hawthorn	8.13 (61)	Essendon	14.11 (95)	Glenferrie Oval	23,000	19 April 1954
Melbourne	9.10 (64)	Collingwood	15.12 (102)	MCG	45,848	19 April 1954

=== Round 2 ===
Home team	Home team score	Away team	Away team score	Venue	Crowd	Date
Geelong	8.12 (60)	North Melbourne	9.15 (69)	Kardinia Park	21,000	24 April 1954
Essendon	5.18 (48)	South Melbourne	8.13 (61)	Windy Hill	23,000	24 April 1954
Collingwood	12.12 (84)	Fitzroy	5.8 (38)	Victoria Park	25,000	24 April 1954
Carlton	12.10 (82)	Melbourne	15.11 (101)	Princes Park	21,000	24 April 1954
St Kilda	5.9 (39)	Hawthorn	10.10 (70)	Junction Oval	14,000	24 April 1954
Richmond	12.19 (91)	Footscray	9.19 (73)	Punt Road Oval	23,000	24 April 1954

=== Round 3 ===
Home team	Home team score	Away team	Away team score	Venue	Crowd	Date
Hawthorn	11.9 (75)	Melbourne	9.10 (64)	Glenferrie Oval	17,000	1 May 1954
Footscray	17.14 (116)	South Melbourne	3.11 (29)	Western Oval	24,500	1 May 1954
Fitzroy	9.10 (64)	North Melbourne	13.16 (94)	Brunswick Street Oval	16,000	1 May 1954
Essendon	15.10 (100)	Geelong	16.20 (116)	Windy Hill	27,500	1 May 1954
St Kilda	10.10 (70)	Collingwood	10.16 (76)	Junction Oval	22,500	1 May 1954
Richmond	14.20 (104)	Carlton	12.8 (80)	Punt Road Oval	25,000	1 May 1954

=== Round 4 ===
Home team	Home team score	Away team	Away team score	Venue	Crowd	Date
Geelong	13.17 (95)	St Kilda	8.5 (53)	Kardinia Park	18,000	8 May 1954
Collingwood	10.17 (77)	Essendon	9.10 (64)	Victoria Park	37,000	8 May 1954
Carlton	17.21 (123)	Footscray	20.14 (134)	Princes Park	22,000	8 May 1954
South Melbourne	12.9 (81)	Richmond	10.16 (76)	Lake Oval	23,000	8 May 1954
North Melbourne	11.10 (76)	Hawthorn	10.13 (73)	Arden Street Oval	16,000	8 May 1954
Melbourne	14.12 (96)	Fitzroy	7.12 (54)	MCG	17,500	8 May 1954

=== Round 5 ===
Home team	Home team score	Away team	Away team score	Venue	Crowd	Date
Melbourne	14.13 (97)	Richmond	10.7 (67)	MCG	24,247	15 May 1954
Footscray	11.7 (73)	North Melbourne	5.5 (35)	Western Oval	25,500	15 May 1954
Fitzroy	10.16 (76)	St Kilda	11.10 (76)	Brunswick Street Oval	12,000	15 May 1954
Hawthorn	14.13 (97)	Geelong	13.14 (92)	Glenferrie Oval	18,000	15 May 1954
South Melbourne	6.13 (49)	Collingwood	14.17 (101)	Lake Oval	30,000	15 May 1954
Essendon	8.18 (66)	Carlton	9.15 (69)	Windy Hill	25,000	15 May 1954

=== Round 6 ===
Home team	Home team score	Away team	Away team score	Venue	Crowd	Date
North Melbourne	8.14 (62)	South Melbourne	12.13 (85)	Arden Street Oval	15,000	22 May 1954
St Kilda	14.15 (99)	Melbourne	12.6 (78)	Junction Oval	16,000	22 May 1954
Richmond	10.12 (72)	Hawthorn	11.12 (78)	Punt Road Oval	23,000	22 May 1954
Footscray	12.8 (80)	Essendon	4.7 (31)	Western Oval	30,000	22 May 1954
Geelong	13.17 (95)	Collingwood	9.8 (62)	Kardinia Park	32,500	22 May 1954
Fitzroy	8.10 (58)	Carlton	15.10 (100)	Brunswick Street Oval	20,000	22 May 1954

=== Round 7 ===
Home team	Home team score	Away team	Away team score	Venue	Crowd	Date
Melbourne	15.21 (111)	South Melbourne	14.5 (89)	MCG	23,025	29 May 1954
Essendon	22.13 (145)	Fitzroy	7.12 (54)	Windy Hill	17,500	29 May 1954
Collingwood	11.8 (74)	Richmond	14.13 (97)	Victoria Park	34,000	29 May 1954
Carlton	12.20 (92)	Geelong	11.16 (82)	Princes Park	31,000	29 May 1954
St Kilda	10.12 (72)	North Melbourne	9.24 (78)	Junction Oval	20,500	29 May 1954
Hawthorn	10.9 (69)	Footscray	11.12 (78)	Glenferrie Oval	26,000	29 May 1954

=== Round 8 ===
Home team	Home team score	Away team	Away team score	Venue	Crowd	Date
Richmond	17.13 (115)	St Kilda	10.6 (66)	Punt Road Oval	17,000	5 June 1954
Geelong	11.5 (71)	Melbourne	10.20 (80)	Kardinia Park	17,000	5 June 1954
Essendon	14.14 (98)	North Melbourne	10.15 (75)	Windy Hill	23,000	5 June 1954
South Melbourne	6.13 (49)	Hawthorn	8.10 (58)	Lake Oval	22,000	5 June 1954
Footscray	13.9 (87)	Fitzroy	10.14 (74)	Western Oval	21,000	5 June 1954
Collingwood	11.15 (81)	Carlton	10.12 (72)	Victoria Park	40,000	5 June 1954

=== Round 9 ===
Home team	Home team score	Away team	Away team score	Venue	Crowd	Date
St Kilda	2.18 (30)	South Melbourne	13.18 (96)	Junction Oval	21,500	12 June 1954
Fitzroy	6.17 (53)	Richmond	11.13 (79)	Brunswick Street Oval	19,000	12 June 1954
North Melbourne	13.13 (91)	Collingwood	10.12 (72)	Arden Street Oval	30,000	12 June 1954
Carlton	5.11 (41)	Hawthorn	4.12 (36)	Princes Park	34,000	14 June 1954
Geelong	9.13 (67)	Footscray	8.15 (63)	Kardinia Park	33,400	14 June 1954
Melbourne	11.13 (79)	Essendon	14.17 (101)	MCG	36,800	14 June 1954

=== Round 10 ===
Home team	Home team score	Away team	Away team score	Venue	Crowd	Date
Footscray	10.13 (73)	Melbourne	8.9 (57)	Western Oval	24,000	26 June 1954
Fitzroy	11.10 (76)	South Melbourne	10.14 (74)	Brunswick Street Oval	14,000	26 June 1954
Richmond	18.12 (120)	Geelong	13.17 (95)	Punt Road Oval	30,000	26 June 1954
St Kilda	9.12 (66)	Essendon	10.19 (79)	Junction Oval	20,000	26 June 1954
Hawthorn	11.5 (71)	Collingwood	10.15 (75)	Glenferrie Oval	25,000	26 June 1954
North Melbourne	9.13 (67)	Carlton	9.10 (64)	Arden Street Oval	25,000	26 June 1954

=== Round 11 ===
Home team	Home team score	Away team	Away team score	Venue	Crowd	Date
Melbourne	15.15 (105)	North Melbourne	11.6 (72)	MCG	18,180	3 July 1954
Essendon	13.9 (87)	Richmond	13.6 (84)	Windy Hill	28,000	3 July 1954
Collingwood	12.10 (82)	Footscray	10.12 (72)	Victoria Park	40,000	3 July 1954
Carlton	9.16 (70)	St Kilda	12.10 (82)	Princes Park	15,000	3 July 1954
South Melbourne	9.10 (64)	Geelong	17.12 (114)	Lake Oval	18,000	3 July 1954
Hawthorn	11.15 (81)	Fitzroy	11.10 (76)	Glenferrie Oval	12,000	3 July 1954

=== Round 12 ===
Home team	Home team score	Away team	Away team score	Venue	Crowd	Date
Essendon	13.16 (94)	Hawthorn	9.9 (63)	Windy Hill	20,000	10 July 1954
Collingwood	8.6 (54)	Melbourne	5.16 (46)	Victoria Park	29,000	10 July 1954
Carlton	11.10 (76)	South Melbourne	10.10 (70)	Princes Park	17,000	10 July 1954
Richmond	14.14 (98)	North Melbourne	6.15 (51)	Punt Road Oval	27,000	10 July 1954
St Kilda	9.8 (62)	Footscray	13.14 (92)	Junction Oval	22,500	10 July 1954
Geelong	10.8 (68)	Fitzroy	6.6 (42)	Kardinia Park	15,000	10 July 1954

=== Round 13 ===
Home team	Home team score	Away team	Away team score	Venue	Crowd	Date
Hawthorn	14.17 (101)	St Kilda	5.10 (40)	Glenferrie Oval	11,000	17 July 1954
North Melbourne	5.13 (43)	Geelong	10.2 (62)	Arden Street Oval	20,000	17 July 1954
Melbourne	10.16 (76)	Carlton	6.5 (41)	MCG	29,406	17 July 1954
Footscray	6.9 (45)	Richmond	6.13 (49)	Western Oval	30,250	24 July 1954
South Melbourne	8.18 (66)	Essendon	13.8 (86)	Lake Oval	23,000	24 July 1954
Fitzroy	12.9 (81)	Collingwood	6.13 (49)	Brunswick Street Oval	20,000	24 July 1954

=== Round 14 ===
Home team	Home team score	Away team	Away team score	Venue	Crowd	Date
Collingwood	12.13 (85)	St Kilda	7.15 (57)	Victoria Park	16,500	31 July 1954
Carlton	9.11 (65)	Richmond	6.10 (46)	Princes Park	25,863	31 July 1954
Melbourne	16.14 (110)	Hawthorn	5.3 (33)	MCG	26,708	31 July 1954
South Melbourne	6.5 (41)	Footscray	11.12 (78)	Lake Oval	19,500	31 July 1954
North Melbourne	8.19 (67)	Fitzroy	8.6 (54)	Arden Street Oval	11,000	31 July 1954
Geelong	16.14 (110)	Essendon	11.10 (76)	Kardinia Park	28,158	31 July 1954

=== Round 15 ===
Home team	Home team score	Away team	Away team score	Venue	Crowd	Date
Richmond	12.15 (87)	South Melbourne	6.16 (52)	Punt Road Oval	12,000	7 August 1954
Hawthorn	9.5 (59)	North Melbourne	10.22 (82)	Glenferrie Oval	7,000	7 August 1954
Fitzroy	8.11 (59)	Melbourne	6.12 (48)	Brunswick Street Oval	10,000	7 August 1954
St Kilda	7.17 (59)	Geelong	18.13 (121)	Junction Oval	12,000	7 August 1954
Essendon	10.11 (71)	Collingwood	6.16 (52)	Windy Hill	23,000	7 August 1954
Footscray	6.7 (43)	Carlton	8.12 (60)	Western Oval	22,000	7 August 1954

=== Round 16 ===
Home team	Home team score	Away team	Away team score	Venue	Crowd	Date
Geelong	13.12 (90)	Hawthorn	7.6 (48)	Kardinia Park	16,870	14 August 1954
Collingwood	12.16 (88)	South Melbourne	13.12 (90)	Victoria Park	18,556	14 August 1954
Carlton	10.16 (76)	Essendon	11.14 (80)	Princes Park	29,744	14 August 1954
Richmond	10.18 (78)	Melbourne	15.4 (94)	Punt Road Oval	24,000	14 August 1954
North Melbourne	9.14 (68)	Footscray	9.14 (68)	Arden Street Oval	22,000	14 August 1954
St Kilda	13.14 (92)	Fitzroy	9.15 (69)	Junction Oval	11,500	14 August 1954

=== Round 17 ===
Home team	Home team score	Away team	Away team score	Venue	Crowd	Date
Melbourne	14.13 (97)	St Kilda	5.10 (40)	MCG	16,700	21 August 1954
Hawthorn	10.10 (70)	Richmond	6.11 (47)	Glenferrie Oval	14,000	21 August 1954
Essendon	7.17 (59)	Footscray	11.12 (78)	Windy Hill	36,000	21 August 1954
Collingwood	6.14 (50)	Geelong	10.12 (72)	Victoria Park	36,000	21 August 1954
Carlton	22.11 (143)	Fitzroy	14.7 (91)	Princes Park	12,100	21 August 1954
South Melbourne	11.14 (80)	North Melbourne	14.11 (95)	Lake Oval	15,000	21 August 1954

=== Round 18 ===
Home team	Home team score	Away team	Away team score	Venue	Crowd	Date
North Melbourne	19.15 (129)	St Kilda	12.10 (82)	Arden Street Oval	9,500	28 August 1954
Footscray	17.15 (117)	Hawthorn	5.4 (34)	Western Oval	22,896	28 August 1954
South Melbourne	7.7 (49)	Melbourne	14.17 (101)	Lake Oval	25,000	28 August 1954
Fitzroy	14.13 (97)	Essendon	13.13 (91)	Brunswick Street Oval	20,000	28 August 1954
Richmond	14.17 (101)	Collingwood	6.12 (48)	Punt Road Oval	25,000	28 August 1954
Geelong	13.12 (90)	Carlton	6.13 (49)	Kardinia Park	23,119	28 August 1954

== Ladder ==
(P)	Premiers
	Qualified for finals

#	Team	P	W	L	D	PF	PA	%	Pts
1	Geelong	18	13	5	0	1630	1225	133.1	52
2	Footscray (P)	18	11	6	1	1423	1095	130.0	46
3	North Melbourne	18	11	6	1	1355	1361	99.6	46
4	Melbourne	18	11	7	0	1504	1239	121.4	44
5	Richmond	18	10	8	0	1503	1310	114.7	40
6	Essendon	18	10	8	0	1471	1364	107.8	40
7	Collingwood	18	10	8	0	1312	1301	100.8	40
8	Carlton	18	8	10	0	1382	1391	99.4	32
9	Hawthorn	18	8	10	0	1177	1337	88.0	32
10	South Melbourne	18	6	12	0	1209	1482	81.6	24
11	Fitzroy	18	4	13	1	1174	1604	73.2	18
12	St Kilda	18	4	13	1	1149	1580	72.7	18

Rules for classification: 1. premiership points; 2. percentage; 3. points for
Average score: 75.4
Source: AFL Tables

== Finals series ==
=== Semi-finals ===
First semi-final
Saturday, 4 September 2:30pm	North Melbourne	def. by	Melbourne	MCG (crowd: 42,166)
3.4 (22); 5.7 (37); 7.12 (54); 11.14 (80)	Q1; Q2; Q3; Final	1.4 (10); 4.7 (31); 9.11 (65); 16.14 (110)	Umpires: Barbour
Templar 5 Aylett 3 Brooker, Grambeau, Spencer 1	Goals	6 Clarke; 3 Albiston, Case; 1 Barassi, Collins, Johnson, McKenzie
Brady, Marchesi, Lawrence, Templar, Brooker	Best	McGivern, Clarke, Case, Williams, Marquis, Beckwith, Arnold, Barassi

Second semi-final
Saturday, 11 September 2:30pm	Geelong	def. by	Footscray	MCG (crowd: 64,686)
4.5 (29); 4.8 (32); 7.10 (52); 8.14 (63)	Q1; Q2; Q3; Final	3.1 (19); 7.7 (49); 7.10 (52); 11.19 (85)	Umpires: Robinson
Goninon 2 Sharp, Flanagan, Palmer, Trezise, Davis, McMahon 1	Goals	4 Collins; 2 Kerr, Stevens; 1 Duffy, Edwards, Gilmore
Hovey, Williams, Smith, Davis, Pianto	Best	Stevens, Whitten, Box, Kerr, Ross

=== Preliminary final ===
Preliminary Final
Saturday, 18 September 2:30pm	Geelong	def. by	Melbourne	MCG (crowd: 51,985)
2.3 (15); 4.3 (27); 5.6 (36); 7.8 (50)	Q1; Q2; Q3; Final	1.1 (7); 3.3 (21); 7.5 (47); 10.7 (67)	Umpires: Jamieson
Wiltshire 2 Pianto, Goninon, Davis, Turner, Trezise 1	Goals	3 Clarke, Albiston; 1 Barassi, Laidlaw, Johnson, Spencer
Pianto, Smith, Middlemiss, Williams, Turner, Sharp	Best	Cordner, Melville, Case, Williams, McLean, Albiston
Williams (cramp)	Injuries

=== Grand final ===
Team	1 Qtr	2 Qtr	3 Qtr	Final
Footscray	6.3	8.5	12.9	15.12 (102)
Melbourne	1.4	4.6	6.7	7.9 (51)

== Season notes ==
- Despite winning the 'wooden spoon', St Kilda defeated both Grand Final teams during the home and away rounds.
- North Melbourne are renamed "The Kangaroos" from "The Shinboners".
- In round 8, Essendon champion full-forward John Coleman sustained a career-ending knee injury (he left the field having scored 42 goals in five and a half matches). With two other players also injured, Essendon finished the match with 17 men.
- A group of Fitzroy players and supporters, who were offered a series of side bets at 10/1, back Fitzroy. Fitzroy produces a shock result, beating Collingwood 12.9 (81) to 6.13 (49), and the punters collect around £2,000 (approx. $40,000 in 2007).
- An injured Charlie Sutton (he had not played in the second semi-final) is picked in Footscray's Grand-Final team. Although not playing in his usual back-pocket position, he plays reasonably well in the forward-pocket, and kicks three goals.

== Awards ==
- The 1954 VFL Premiership team was Footscray. This was the first premiership won by Footscray since it entered the VFL in 1925, and their last until 2016.
- The VFL's leading goalkicker was Jack Collins of Footscray who kicked 84 goals (including 11 goals in the final series).
- The winner of the 1954 Brownlow Medal was Roy Wright of Richmond with 29 votes (he had missed one match through illness, but still won the medal by 10 votes).
- St Kilda took the "wooden spoon" in 1954.

== Sources ==
- 1954 VFL season at AFL Tables
- 1954 VFL season at Australian Football
