= Twomey =

Twomey Ó Tuama
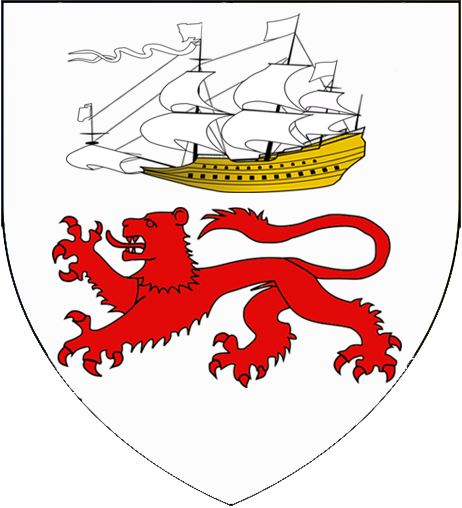
- Parent house: Corcu Loígde
- Country: Munster & Desmond
- Founder: Donnchadh na Tuaima

Twomey (Irish: Ó Tuama) is an Irish Gaelic clan based most prominently in what is today County Cork. The paternal ancestors of the clan are of the Corcu Loígde; the Twomey clan originated from Donnchadh na Tuaima who was himself a member of the O'Leary family. The Twomey family motto is "fortis undis et armis" which translates to 'strong waves and arms'.

Notable people with the surname include:

- Anne Carolyn Twomey (born 1951), American stage, film, and television actress
- Anne Frances Twomey, Australian legal academic
- Bill Twomey Jr. (1927–1996), Australian rules football player
- Bill Twomey Sr. (1899–1977), Australian rules football player
- Billy Twomey (born 1977), Irish equestrian
- Bly Twomey (born April 2010), British paralympian table tennis player
- Chris Twomey (born 1954), American artist and filmmaker
- Christina Twomey, Australian historian
- Cillian Twomey, Irish geriatric consultant
- Clare Twomey (born 1968), British visual artist and researcher
- David Twomey (born 1961), Australian rules footballer
- Frank Twomey (born 1950s), Irish actor and impressionist, known for the children's television programme Bosco
- Hugh Twomey (1920–1989), Canadian physician and politician
- Jeremiah F. Twomey (1874–1963), New York politician
- Jeremiah Twomey (1847–1921), journalist and Member of the New Zealand Legislative Council
- Joanne Twomey, American politician from Maine
- Joe Twomey (fl. mid-20th century), Irish hurler
- John Twomey (disambiguation), several people
- Kay Twomey (1914–1995), American songwriter and music arranger
- Liam Twomey (born 1967), Irish Fine Gael politician from Wexford
- Margaret Twomey (born 1963), Australian diplomat; ambassador to Russia (2008–2012)
- Mathilda Twomey, Seychellois lawyer and academic
- Mick Twomey (1931–2015), Australian rules football player
- Moss (Maurice) Twomey (1897–1978), Irish republican; chief of staff of the IRA
- Nora Twomey (born 1971), Irish animator and filmmaker
- Pat Twomey (1929–1969), Australian rules football player
- Patrick Twomey (1892–1963), New Zealand community worker; secretary of the Leper Trust Board
- Paul Twomey (born 1961), American business consultant; CEO of ICANN
- Seamus Twomey (1919–1989), Irish republican; twice chief of the Provisional IRA
- Seán Ó Tuama (1926–2006), Irish poet, playwright and academic
- Seán Twomey (born 2000), Irish hurler
- Sharon Twomey (born 1964), Irish actress
- Vincent Twomey (born 1941), Irish priest
- Vincy Twomey (1929–1993), Irish hurler
- Wayde Twomey (born 1986), Australian rules footballer

== See also ==
- Mount Twomey
- Twomey Cellars, a winery in California
- Twomey effect
- Twomey, Alberta
