= 1953 VFL season =

57th season of the Victorian Football League (VFL)

1953 VFL premiership season
- Teams: 12
- Premiers: Collingwood; 12th premiership
- Minor premiers: Geelong; 8th minor premiership
- Brownlow Medallist: Bill Hutchison (Essendon)
- Leading goalkicker medallist: John Coleman (Essendon)
- Matches played: 112
- Highest: 89,149

The 1953 VFL season was the 57th season of the Victorian Football League (VFL), the highest level senior Australian rules football competition in Victoria. The season featured twelve clubs, ran from 18 April until 26 September, and comprised an 18-game home-and-away season followed by a finals series featuring the top four clubs.

The premiership was won by the Collingwood Football Club for the twelfth time, after it defeated Geelong by twelve points in the 1953 VFL Grand Final.

== Background ==
In 1953, the VFL competition consisted of twelve teams of 18 on-the-field players each, plus two substitute players, known as the 19th man and the 20th man. A player could be substituted for any reason; however, once substituted, a player could not return to the field of play under any circumstances.

Teams played each other in a home-and-away season of 18 rounds; matches 12 to 18 were the "home-and-way reverse" of matches 1 to 7.

Once the 18 round home-and-away season had finished, the 1953 VFL Premiers were determined by the specific format and conventions of the Page–McIntyre system.

== Home-and-away season ==
=== Round 1 ===
Home team	Home team score	Away team	Away team score	Venue	Crowd	Date
Geelong	12.15 (87)	Hawthorn	5.8 (38)	Kardinia Park	19,877	18 April 1953
Essendon	17.9 (111)	Fitzroy	12.16 (88)	Windy Hill	23,100	18 April 1953
Collingwood	17.16 (118)	South Melbourne	11.11 (77)	Victoria Park	29,678	18 April 1953
Carlton	7.18 (60)	Footscray	9.11 (65)	Princes Park	27,198	18 April 1953
St Kilda	8.9 (57)	North Melbourne	14.21 (105)	Junction Oval	14,000	18 April 1953
Richmond	11.7 (73)	Melbourne	9.13 (67)	Punt Road Oval	18,000	18 April 1953

=== Round 2 ===
Home team	Home team score	Away team	Away team score	Venue	Crowd	Date
Hawthorn	8.9 (57)	St Kilda	13.14 (92)	Glenferrie Oval	12,000	2 May 1953
Footscray	8.13 (61)	Geelong	15.12 (102)	Western Oval	28,500	2 May 1953
Fitzroy	12.9 (81)	Richmond	11.14 (80)	Brunswick Street Oval	21,000	2 May 1953
South Melbourne	13.21 (99)	Essendon	13.11 (89)	Lake Oval	29,231	2 May 1953
North Melbourne	18.10 (118)	Collingwood	11.9 (75)	Arden Street Oval	21,377	2 May 1953
Melbourne	8.11 (59)	Carlton	13.12 (90)	MCG	29,204	2 May 1953

=== Round 3 ===
Home team	Home team score	Away team	Away team score	Venue	Crowd	Date
Footscray	16.15 (111)	Hawthorn	6.6 (42)	Western Oval	15,000	9 May 1953
Essendon	17.20 (122)	St Kilda	7.16 (58)	Windy Hill	18,000	9 May 1953
Collingwood	9.19 (73)	Geelong	14.14 (98)	Victoria Park	33,000	9 May 1953
North Melbourne	12.12 (84)	Melbourne	11.17 (83)	Arden Street Oval	12,000	9 May 1953
South Melbourne	10.15 (75)	Fitzroy	12.14 (86)	Lake Oval	24,000	9 May 1953
Richmond	15.8 (98)	Carlton	16.8 (104)	Punt Road Oval	31,000	9 May 1953

=== Round 4 ===
Home team	Home team score	Away team	Away team score	Venue	Crowd	Date
Hawthorn	7.11 (53)	South Melbourne	9.9 (63)	Glenferrie Oval	12,000	16 May 1953
Fitzroy	12.14 (86)	North Melbourne	10.15 (75)	Brunswick Street Oval	20,500	16 May 1953
Carlton	14.11 (95)	Collingwood	14.19 (103)	Princes Park	37,500	16 May 1953
St Kilda	11.17 (83)	Richmond	8.17 (65)	Junction Oval	16,500	16 May 1953
Melbourne	4.6 (30)	Footscray	9.21 (75)	MCG	23,727	16 May 1953
Geelong	12.7 (79)	Essendon	9.11 (65)	Kardinia Park	35,000	16 May 1953

=== Round 5 ===
Home team	Home team score	Away team	Away team score	Venue	Crowd	Date
Essendon	6.10 (46)	Melbourne	9.3 (57)	Windy Hill	9,500	23 May 1953
Collingwood	13.18 (96)	Hawthorn	3.8 (26)	Victoria Park	9,627	23 May 1953
Carlton	7.10 (52)	St Kilda	6.7 (43)	Princes Park	9,150	23 May 1953
South Melbourne	8.10 (58)	North Melbourne	9.8 (62)	Lake Oval	11,000	23 May 1953
Richmond	6.16 (52)	Geelong	15.16 (106)	Punt Road Oval	10,000	23 May 1953
Footscray	10.6 (66)	Fitzroy	1.0 (6)	Western Oval	14,087	23 May 1953

=== Round 6 ===
Home team	Home team score	Away team	Away team score	Venue	Crowd	Date
Geelong	14.16 (100)	South Melbourne	7.5 (47)	Kardinia Park	24,832	30 May 1953
Collingwood	9.8 (62)	Richmond	5.9 (39)	Victoria Park	23,036	30 May 1953
St Kilda	10.9 (69)	Footscray	14.9 (93)	Junction Oval	19,000	30 May 1953
Melbourne	10.11 (71)	Fitzroy	12.9 (81)	MCG	21,205	30 May 1953
North Melbourne	7.9 (51)	Essendon	9.14 (68)	Arden Street Oval	25,000	30 May 1953
Hawthorn	10.7 (67)	Carlton	6.11 (47)	Glenferrie Oval	12,000	30 May 1953

=== Round 7 ===
Home team	Home team score	Away team	Away team score	Venue	Crowd	Date
St Kilda	7.11 (53)	South Melbourne	18.16 (124)	Junction Oval	21,000	6 June 1953
Fitzroy	8.12 (60)	Hawthorn	5.14 (44)	Brunswick Street Oval	9,500	6 June 1953
Essendon	11.18 (84)	Richmond	7.6 (48)	Windy Hill	21,000	6 June 1953
Carlton	14.16 (100)	North Melbourne	7.6 (48)	Princes Park	22,219	6 June 1953
Melbourne	8.10 (58)	Geelong	11.16 (82)	MCG	26,254	6 June 1953
Footscray	7.9 (51)	Collingwood	7.10 (52)	Western Oval	32,114	6 June 1953

=== Round 8 ===
Home team	Home team score	Away team	Away team score	Venue	Crowd	Date
Hawthorn	8.14 (62)	North Melbourne	12.8 (80)	Glenferrie Oval	7,000	13 June 1953
Collingwood	19.17 (131)	St Kilda	8.8 (56)	Victoria Park	16,200	13 June 1953
South Melbourne	11.11 (77)	Melbourne	9.17 (71)	Lake Oval	22,565	13 June 1953
Richmond	8.11 (59)	Footscray	9.14 (68)	Punt Road Oval	16,000	13 June 1953
Geelong	21.10 (136)	Fitzroy	7.8 (50)	Kardinia Park	21,489	13 June 1953
Essendon	14.14 (98)	Carlton	7.11 (53)	Windy Hill	30,300	13 June 1953

=== Round 9 ===
Home team	Home team score	Away team	Away team score	Venue	Crowd	Date
North Melbourne	6.9 (45)	Richmond	5.12 (42)	Arden Street Oval	9,000	20 June 1953
Footscray	5.13 (43)	South Melbourne	11.6 (72)	Western Oval	21,105	20 June 1953
St Kilda	6.8 (44)	Geelong	9.6 (60)	Junction Oval	9,500	20 June 1953
Hawthorn	9.10 (64)	Essendon	12.15 (87)	Glenferrie Oval	8,000	20 June 1953
Melbourne	7.6 (48)	Collingwood	9.9 (63)	MCG	27,175	20 June 1953
Fitzroy	7.12 (54)	Carlton	7.18 (60)	Brunswick Street Oval	15,000	20 June 1953

=== Round 10 ===
Home team	Home team score	Away team	Away team score	Venue	Crowd	Date
Fitzroy	11.9 (75)	St Kilda	7.10 (52)	Brunswick Street Oval	9,500	27 June 1953
Carlton	8.15 (63)	Geelong	10.14 (74)	Princes Park	32,526	27 June 1953
South Melbourne	12.7 (79)	Richmond	6.14 (50)	Lake Oval	17,000	27 June 1953
Melbourne	10.14 (74)	Hawthorn	16.6 (102)	MCG	11,993	27 June 1953
North Melbourne	3.7 (25)	Footscray	5.12 (42)	Arden Street Oval	15,000	27 June 1953
Essendon	11.14 (80)	Collingwood	6.16 (52)	Windy Hill	31,900	27 June 1953

=== Round 11 ===
Home team	Home team score	Away team	Away team score	Venue	Crowd	Date
Geelong	12.14 (86)	North Melbourne	13.7 (85)	Kardinia Park	21,130	4 July 1953
Collingwood	7.19 (61)	Fitzroy	9.8 (62)	Victoria Park	25,078	4 July 1953
Carlton	14.13 (97)	South Melbourne	10.13 (73)	Princes Park	29,688	4 July 1953
St Kilda	11.7 (73)	Melbourne	8.21 (69)	Junction Oval	12,000	4 July 1953
Richmond	12.10 (82)	Hawthorn	7.6 (48)	Punt Road Oval	11,000	4 July 1953
Footscray	9.15 (69)	Essendon	7.11 (53)	Western Oval	34,884	4 July 1953

=== Round 12 ===
Home team	Home team score	Away team	Away team score	Venue	Crowd	Date
Melbourne	11.9 (75)	Richmond	11.9 (75)	MCG	19,402	11 July 1953
Hawthorn	9.8 (62)	Geelong	12.14 (86)	Glenferrie Oval	14,000	11 July 1953
Footscray	13.12 (90)	Carlton	8.18 (66)	Western Oval	31,668	11 July 1953
North Melbourne	20.11 (131)	St Kilda	5.16 (46)	Arden Street Oval	10,500	18 July 1953
Fitzroy	7.20 (62)	Essendon	14.13 (97)	Brunswick Street Oval	25,500	18 July 1953
South Melbourne	12.9 (81)	Collingwood	17.17 (119)	Lake Oval	30,000	18 July 1953

=== Round 13 ===
Home team	Home team score	Away team	Away team score	Venue	Crowd	Date
Essendon	12.11 (83)	South Melbourne	8.14 (62)	Windy Hill	23,000	25 July 1953
Collingwood	13.16 (94)	North Melbourne	8.17 (65)	Victoria Park	23,868	25 July 1953
Carlton	12.24 (96)	Melbourne	10.10 (70)	Princes Park	16,367	25 July 1953
St Kilda	9.13 (67)	Hawthorn	4.14 (38)	Junction Oval	7,500	25 July 1953
Geelong	11.12 (78)	Footscray	8.10 (58)	Kardinia Park	32,093	25 July 1953
Richmond	13.7 (85)	Fitzroy	13.12 (90)	Punt Road Oval	15,000	25 July 1953

=== Round 14 ===
Home team	Home team score	Away team	Away team score	Venue	Crowd	Date
Melbourne	9.13 (67)	North Melbourne	8.16 (64)	MCG	13,768	1 August 1953
Fitzroy	12.18 (90)	South Melbourne	7.19 (61)	Brunswick Street Oval	16,000	1 August 1953
Carlton	15.16 (106)	Richmond	10.19 (79)	Princes Park	21,508	1 August 1953
Hawthorn	3.10 (28)	Footscray	11.10 (76)	Glenferrie Oval	10,000	1 August 1953
St Kilda	9.10 (64)	Essendon	14.15 (99)	Junction Oval	19,500	1 August 1953
Geelong	7.13 (55)	Collingwood	10.15 (75)	Kardinia Park	31,635	1 August 1953

=== Round 15 ===
Home team	Home team score	Away team	Away team score	Venue	Crowd	Date
Richmond	13.16 (94)	St Kilda	11.14 (80)	Punt Road Oval	9,500	8 August 1953
Footscray	14.14 (98)	Melbourne	9.7 (61)	Western Oval	18,075	8 August 1953
Essendon	8.13 (61)	Geelong	7.8 (50)	Windy Hill	41,000	8 August 1953
South Melbourne	7.12 (54)	Hawthorn	9.8 (62)	Lake Oval	8,500	8 August 1953
North Melbourne	17.19 (121)	Fitzroy	7.9 (51)	Arden Street Oval	12,000	8 August 1953
Collingwood	12.15 (87)	Carlton	9.16 (70)	Victoria Park	31,277	8 August 1953

=== Round 16 ===
Home team	Home team score	Away team	Away team score	Venue	Crowd	Date
North Melbourne	8.8 (56)	South Melbourne	11.21 (87)	Arden Street Oval	8,000	15 August 1953
Geelong	14.18 (102)	Richmond	4.9 (33)	Kardinia Park	10,000	15 August 1953
Fitzroy	7.11 (53)	Footscray	14.14 (98)	Brunswick Street Oval	17,500	15 August 1953
Melbourne	8.9 (57)	Essendon	12.10 (82)	MCG	25,543	15 August 1953
Hawthorn	11.6 (72)	Collingwood	12.16 (88)	Glenferrie Oval	7,000	15 August 1953
St Kilda	8.15 (63)	Carlton	7.16 (58)	Junction Oval	9,700	15 August 1953

=== Round 17 ===
Home team	Home team score	Away team	Away team score	Venue	Crowd	Date
Footscray	12.18 (90)	St Kilda	4.5 (29)	Western Oval	15,158	22 August 1953
Fitzroy	6.13 (49)	Melbourne	9.10 (64)	Brunswick Street Oval	7,500	22 August 1953
Essendon	12.6 (78)	North Melbourne	12.7 (79)	Windy Hill	18,000	22 August 1953
Carlton	12.15 (87)	Hawthorn	6.9 (45)	Princes Park	8,500	22 August 1953
South Melbourne	14.14 (98)	Geelong	8.7 (55)	Lake Oval	21,000	22 August 1953
Richmond	12.9 (81)	Collingwood	13.17 (95)	Punt Road Oval	18,000	22 August 1953

=== Round 18 ===
Home team	Home team score	Away team	Away team score	Venue	Crowd	Date
Geelong	16.14 (110)	Melbourne	8.8 (56)	Kardinia Park	18,124	29 August 1953
Collingwood	10.14 (74)	Footscray	8.7 (55)	Victoria Park	33,867	29 August 1953
South Melbourne	13.20 (98)	St Kilda	4.12 (36)	Lake Oval	13,000	29 August 1953
Hawthorn	9.10 (64)	Fitzroy	13.6 (84)	Glenferrie Oval	5,000	29 August 1953
Richmond	13.7 (85)	Essendon	19.12 (126)	Punt Road Oval	19,000	29 August 1953
North Melbourne	14.10 (94)	Carlton	15.15 (105)	Arden Street Oval	14,000	29 August 1953

== Ladder ==
(P)	Premiers
	Qualified for finals

#	Team	P	W	L	D	PF	PA	%	Pts
1	Geelong	18	15	3	0	1546	1079	143.3	60
2	Collingwood (P)	18	14	4	0	1518	1229	123.5	56
3	Footscray	18	13	5	0	1309	959	136.5	52
4	Essendon	18	13	5	0	1529	1177	129.9	52
5	Carlton	18	10	8	0	1409	1310	107.6	40
6	Fitzroy	18	10	8	0	1208	1421	85.0	40
7	North Melbourne	18	9	9	0	1388	1287	107.8	36
8	South Melbourne	18	9	9	0	1385	1323	104.7	36
9	St Kilda	18	5	13	0	1065	1561	68.2	20
10	Richmond	18	3	14	1	1220	1501	81.3	14
11	Melbourne	18	3	14	1	1137	1420	80.1	14
12	Hawthorn	18	3	15	0	974	1421	68.5	12

Rules for classification: 1. premiership points; 2. percentage; 3. points for
Average score: 72.6
Source: AFL Tables

== Finals series ==
=== Semi-finals ===
Team	1 Qtr	2 Qtr	3 Qtr	Final
Footscray	3.7	3.8	4.11	6.13 (49)
Essendon	1.0	3.7	4.7	5.11(41)
Attendance: 68,533

Team	1 Qtr	2 Qtr	3 Qtr	Final
Geelong	3.1	6.4	7.12	8.12 (60)
Collingwood	2.3	5.7	7.8	13.12 (90)
Attendance: 70,292

=== Preliminary final ===
Team	1 Qtr	2 Qtr	3 Qtr	Final
Geelong	0.6	2.7	6.10	8.15 (63)
Footscray	2.1	3.4	4.5	5.7 (37)
Attendance: 58,615

=== Grand final ===
Team	1 Qtr	2 Qtr	3 Qtr	Final
Collingwood	2.4	5.6	10.10	11.11 (77)
Geelong	2.2	3.9	5.11	8.17 (65)
Attendance: 89,149

== Season notes ==
- Because Anzac Day fell on a Saturday, there was a fortnight between Rounds 1 and 2. On the evening of Friday 24 April a night-time exhibition match was held between Collingwood and Fitzroy, under lights, at the Royal Melbourne Showgrounds for the benefit of St Vincent's Hospital. Collingwood 9.13 (67) defeated Fitzroy 4.19 (43) before a crowd of 22,000.
- Footscray won its first final since joining the league in 1925, their twenty-ninth season. This came after making the finals six times previously and being eliminated each time (1938, 1942, 1944, 1946, 1948 and 1951).
- In Round 2, John Coleman kicked 11 of Essendon's 13 goals.
- In Round 5, Fitzroy came close to becoming the first (and only) VFL/AFL team to be held scoreless in their match against Footscray at the Western Oval, which was played amidst heavy rain and a burst water main. Allan Ruthven managed their only scoring shot, a goal, with about six minutes remaining in the match. To date, it remains the longest amount of time a team has been kept scoreless in a match.
- In a streak spanning from 1952 until 1953, Geelong won 23 consecutive matches and played 26 consecutive matches without defeat; both of these remain VFL/AFL records as of 2023. The winning streak ended in Round 14, when Collingwood defeated Geelong by 20 points. At the time, Geelong had a 13–0 record and a four game lead over second-place, but won only three of its eight remaining games for the season.
- Overall it was a low-scoring season: Footscray's 959 points against remains the lowest average points conceded per game since 1919; the season's highest score of 21.10 (136) was the lowest since 1924; and, for the first time since 1927, there was no match in which both teams scored more than 100 points.
- The Collingwood Grand Final team contained three sets of brothers: Lou Richards and Ron Richards; Bob Rose and Bill Rose; Bill Twomey Jr., Pat Twomey, and Mick Twomey.
- Collingwood supporter and businessman John Wren suffered a heart attack at the 1953 Grand Final and died one month later.

== Awards ==
- The 1953 VFL Premiership team was Collingwood.
- The VFL's leading goalkicker was John Coleman of Essendon who kicked 97 goals (including one goal in the finals).
- The winner of the 1953 Brownlow Medal was Bill Hutchison of Essendon with 26 votes.
- Hawthorn took the "wooden spoon" in 1953.

== Sources ==
- 1953 VFL season at AFL Tables
- 1953 VFL season at Australian Football
