= List of Hawthorn Football Club captains =

This is a list of all captains of the Hawthorn Football Club, an Australian rules football club in the Australian Football League Men's and AFL Women's.

== VFA ==
Season(s)	Name	Honours
1914	Alf Gough	
1915	Joe Larkin	
1919	Len Gibb	
1920	Ted Alley	
1920	Frank Rigaldi	
1921	Jim Jackson	
1922	Arthur Rademacher	
1923–1924	Bill Walton	

== VFL/AFL ==
Season(s)	Name	Honours
1925	Jim Jackson	
1926	Dan Minogue	
1926	Paddy Burke	
1927	Clarrie Lethlean	
1928	Bert Sutton	
1929	Albert Chadwick	
1930–1931	John Harris	
1932	Bert Mills	
1933	Fred Phillips	
1933	Bill Twomey Sr.	
1934	Bert Mills	
1935–1937	Ivan McAlpine	
1938	Bert Mills	
1939	Len Thomas	
1940–1941	Bert Mills	
1942	Jack Carmody	
1943	Bob Williams	
1944	Jim Bohan	
1945	Keith Shea	
1946	Jim Bohan	
1947–1949	Alec Albiston	
1950–1951	Kevin Curran	
1952	Peter O'Donohue	
1953–1954	Ted Fletcher	Best and fairest (1953)
1955–1959	John Kennedy, Sr.	
1960–1968	Graham Arthur	VFL premiership (1961); Best and fairest (1962)
1969–1973	David Parkin	VFL premiership (1971)
1974–1975	Peter Crimmins	
1976–1980	Don Scott	2× VFL premiership (1976, 1978)
1981–1985	Leigh Matthews	VFL premiership (1983); VFLPA MVP award (1982); Peter Crimmins Perpetual Memorial Medal (1982); 4× Hawthorn leading goalkicker (1981, 1982, 1983, 1984); 2× VFL Team of the Year (1982, 1983)
1986–1991	Michael Tuck	4× VFL/AFL premiership (1986, 1988, 1989, 1991); VFLPA best captain (1986); VFL Team of the year (1990)
1992–1993	Gary Ayres	
1994	Chris Langford	All-Australian team (1994)
1995–1998	Jason Dunstall	3× Hawthorn leading goalkicker (1995, 1996, 1998)
1999–2004	Shane Crawford	Brownlow Medal (1999); AFLPA MVP (1999); 2× All-Australian team (1999, 2002); 3× Peter Crimmins Memorial Trophy (1999, 2002, 2003)
2005–2007	Richie Vandenberg	
2008–2010	Sam Mitchell	AFL premiership (2008); Peter Crimmins Medal (2009)
2011–2016	Luke Hodge	3× AFL premiership (2013, 2014, 2015); Norm Smith Medal (2014); AFLPA best captain (2014)
2017–2018	Jarryd Roughead	Hawthorn leading goalkicker (2017)
2019–2020	Ben Stratton	
2021–2022	Ben McEvoy	
2023–2025	James Sicily	All-Australian team (2023)
2026–	Jai Newcombe	
2026–	James Sicily	

== AFL Women's ==
Seasons(s)	Names	Honours
2022 S7–2023	Tilly Lucas-Rodd	Hawthorn best and fairest (2022 S7)
2024–	Emily Bates	
