= Greek Team of the Century =

Hypothetical team in Australian rules football

The Greek Team of the Century was a representative team chosen in 2004 in the sport of Australian rules football.

Anthony Koutoufides and Peter Daicos were named vice-captains; Lou Richards was captain. The criterion for selection was that any Greek blood whatsoever constituted eligibility for the team. The furthest bloodline was from Russell Morris, whose fourth great-grandfather was Greek. Koutoufides was also listed in the Italian Team of the Century.

== The Squad ==
Australian Football League historian Col Hutchinson supplied the selectors with a list of 28 players with which to pick the final team.

Greek Team of the Century
B:	George Lakes	Ang Christou	
HB:	Angelo Lekkas	Russell Morris	Vasil Varlamos
C:	Andrew Demetriou	Anthony Koutoufides	
HF:	Daniel Metropolis	Athas Hrysoulakis	
F:	Spiro Kourkoumelis	Peter Daicos (Vice-captain)	Jason Traianidis
Foll:	Steve Malaxos	Lou Richards (Captain)	John Georgiou
Int:	Luke Beveridge	Peter Kanis	Zeno Tzatzaris
Int:	Chris Pavlou		
Coach:	Ron Richards		

Players named in no particular position:

- John Rombotis
- Chris Pavlou
- Charlie Pannam Snr.
- Charlie Pannam Jnr.
- Zeno Tzatzaris
- Alby Pannam
- Alex Marcou
- Spiro Malakellis
- Arthur Karanicolas
- Con Gorozidis
- Gary Frangalas

== See also ==
- Indigenous Team of the Century
- Italian Team of the Century
