= 1933 Hawthorn Football Club season =

9th season in the Victorian Football League

Hawthorn Football Club
1933 season
- President: Dr. Jacob Jona
- Coach: Arthur Rademacher (acting); Bill Twomey, Sr.
- Captain: Bill Twomey, Sr.
- Home ground: Glenferrie Oval
- VFL Season: 3–15 (11th)
- Finals Series: Did not qualify
- Best and Fairest: Bert Mills
- Leading goalkicker: Ted Pool (27)
- Highest home attendance: 16,000 (Round 2 vs. Carlton)
- Lowest home attendance: 4,000 (Round 14 vs. North Melbourne, Round 18 vs. Essendon)
- Average home attendance: 10,389

The 1933 season was the Hawthorn Football Club's 9th season in the Victorian Football League and 32nd overall. Arthur Rademacher stepped in as coach after appointed coach Fred Phillips died on the eve of the season. Rademacher coached the first four games before Hawthorn appointed Bill Twomey, Sr. as coach for the rest of the season.

== Fixture ==
=== Premiership Season ===
Rd	Date and local time	Opponent	Scores (Hawthorn's scores indicated in bold)			Venue	Attendance	Record
Rd	Date and local time	Opponent	Home	Away	Result	Venue	Attendance	Record
1	Saturday, 29 April (2:45 pm)	St Kilda	10.17 (77)	**11.13 (79)**	Won by 2 points	Junction Oval (A)	14,000	1–0
2	Saturday, 6 May (2:45 pm)	Carlton	**10.12 (72)**	11.14 (80)	Lost by 8 points	Glenferrie Oval (H)	16,000	1–1
3	Saturday, 13 May (2:45 pm)	North Melbourne	10.15 (75)	**10.7 (67)**	Lost by 8 points	Arden Street Oval (A)	5,000	1–2
4	Saturday, 20 May (2:45 pm)	Footscray	**7.15 (57)**	14.10 (94)	Lost by 37 points	Glenferrie Oval (H)	12,000	1–3
5	Saturday, 27 May (2:45 pm)	Richmond	**7.14 (56)**	9.9 (63)	Lost by 7 points	Glenferrie Oval (H)	12,000	1–4
6	Saturday, 3 June (2:45 pm)	South Melbourne	10.13 (73)	**9.6 (60)**	Lost by 13 points	Lake Oval (A)	13,000	1–5
7	Saturday, 10 June (2:45 pm)	Essendon	15.6 (96)	**16.9 (105)**	Won by 9 points	Windy Hill (A)	9,000	2–5
8	Saturday, 17 June (2:45 pm)	Fitzroy	**9.14 (68)**	11.13 (79)	Lost by 11 points	Glenferrie Oval (H)	13,000	2–6
9	Saturday, 24 June (2:45 pm)	Geelong	18.25 (133)	**3.6 (24)**	Lost by 109 points	Corio Oval (A)	6,000	2–7
10	Saturday, 1 July (2:45 pm)	Collingwood	**5.14 (44)**	15.6 (96)	Lost by 52 points	Glenferrie Oval (H)	10,000	2–8
11	Saturday, 8 July (2:45 pm)	Melbourne	21.10 (136)	**15.8 (98)**	Lost by 38 points	Melbourne Cricket Ground (A)	6,877	2–9
12	Saturday, 15 July (2:45 pm)	St Kilda	**7.9 (51)**	8.15 (63)	Lost by 12 points	Glenferrie Oval (H)	10,000	2–10
13	Saturday, 22 July (2:45 pm)	Carlton	13.20 (98)	**10.14 (74)**	Lost by 24 points	Princes Park (A)	12,000	2–11
14	Saturday, 29 July (2:45 pm)	North Melbourne	**9.8 (62)**	10.14 (74)	Lost by 12 points	Glenferrie Oval (H)	4,000	2–12
15	Saturday, 5 August (2:45 pm)	Footscray	16.14 (110)	**9.18 (72)**	Lost by 38 points	Western Oval (A)	8,000	2–13
16	Saturday, 19 August (2:45 pm)	Richmond	11.17 (83)	**9.6 (60)**	Lost by 23 points	Punt Road Oval (A)	9,000	2–14
17	Saturday, 26 August (2:45 pm)	South Melbourne	**8.12 (60)**	17.11 (113)	Lost by 53 points	Glenferrie Oval (H)	12,500	2–15
18	Saturday, 2 September (2:45 pm)	Essendon	**10.9 (69)**	8.16 (64)	Won by 5 points	Glenferrie Oval (H)	4,000	3–15

== Ladder ==
(P)	Premiers
	Qualified for finals

#	Team	P	W	L	D	PF	PA	%	Pts
1	Richmond	18	15	3	0	1746	1237	141.1	60
2	South Melbourne (P)	18	13	5	0	1764	1383	127.5	52
3	Carlton	18	13	5	0	1702	1488	114.4	52
4	Geelong	18	12	6	0	1730	1327	130.4	48
5	Fitzroy	18	11	6	1	1534	1453	105.6	46
6	Collingwood	18	11	7	0	1760	1559	112.9	44
7	Footscray	18	11	7	0	1520	1555	97.7	44
8	North Melbourne	18	7	10	1	1463	1717	85.2	30
9	St Kilda	18	6	12	0	1380	1706	80.9	24
10	Melbourne	18	3	15	0	1511	1842	82.0	12
11	Hawthorn	18	3	15	0	1178	1607	73.3	12
12	Essendon	18	2	16	0	1392	1806	77.1	8

Rules for classification: 1. premiership points; 2. percentage; 3. points for
Average score: 86.5
Source: AFL Tables
