= Bill Twomey =

Bill Twomey may refer to:

- Bill Twomey Sr. (born 1899), Australian rules footballer
- Bill Twomey Jr. (1927–2004), Australian rules footballer, son of the above
