= Keith Batchelor =

Australian rules footballer (1930–2009)

Personal information
- Full name: Keith Vincent Batchelor
- Born: 4 October 1930; Melbourne, Victoria
- Died: 24 September 2009 (aged 78); Sydney, New South Wales
- Original team: Murrumbeena
- Debut: 1952 VFL Grand Final, Collingwood vs. Geelong, at Melbourne Cricket Ground
- Height: 183 cm (6 ft 0 in)
- Weight: 86 kg (190 lb)

Playing career^{1}
Years	Club	Games (Goals)
1952–1955	Collingwood	21 (17)
1956–1957	North Melbourne	21 (0)
Total		42 (17)
- ^{1} Playing statistics correct to the end of 1957.

Career highlights
- Collingwood premiership side 1953

Keith Vincent Batchelor (4 October 1930 – 24 September 2009) was an Australian rules footballer, who played in the Victorian Football League (VFL) for Collingwood and North Melbourne in the 1950s. He made his senior debut in the 1952 VFL Grand Final.

== Family ==
The son of Collingwood footballer Vincent George Batchelor (1900-1981), and Mary Alice Batchelor (1902-1970), née Wescott, Keith Vincent Batchelor was born in Melbourne on 4 October 1930.

He married Claire Lavinia Kennedy (1931-2014) on 20 February 1954.

== Football ==
=== Collingwood (VFL) ===
Batchelor came to Collingwood in 1949 as a forward from the suburban club Murrumbeena.

=== Carlton (VFL) ===
Unable to secure a senior game with Collingwood, he was given a clearance to Carlton. Although he was listed by Carlton (1951), and although he played in the Carlton Reserves, he was unable to get a senior game.

=== Collingwood (VFL) ===
In 1952 he was cleared back to Collingwood.

Injuries late in the season allowed the selectors to play him as a defender in the Reserves. Due to his good form in the reserves, and injuries to senior players, he made his senior debut at full-back in the 1952 VFL Grand Final: his opponent, George Goninon, kicked five goals against him, and Geelong won the match by 46 points.

In the 1953 VFL Grand Final Batchelor was played at full-forward; he kicked 4 goals, and Collingwood won the match by 11 points.

=== North Melbourne (VFL) ===
He later was cleared to North Melbourne in 1956 and stayed for two years.

He was 20th man in his last senior match for North Melbourne, against Collingwood, at Victoria Park, on 17 August 1957, the second-last home-and-away match of the 1957 season, and replaced an injured Ray Murphy in the third quarter of the match. He played for the North Melbourne Reserves in the Second Semi-Final against Fitzroy, on 7 September; he injured his knee and was replaced in the third-quarter. He also played at full-back in the Reserves Preliminary-Final against Essendon, on 14 September 1957, and was one of North Melbourne's best players in its Reserves Grand Final win over Fitzroy on 21 September 1957. He was selected as 20th man in the North Melbourne team that lost to Geelong in the 24 September 1957 Night Premiership match.

== Cricket ==
He was also a capable cricketer, and played nine first XI district matches as a specialist bowler for Collingwood between 1949 and 1961.

== Death ==
He died in Sydney, New South Wales on 24 September 2009.
