= David Twomey =

Australian rules footballer (born 1961)

Personal information
- Full name: David Twomey
- Born: 21 February 1961 (age 65)
- Original team: Ivanhoe Amateurs
- Height: 185 cm (6 ft 1 in)
- Weight: 83 kg (183 lb)

Playing career^{1}
Years	Club	Games (Goals)
1979–1985	Collingwood	63 (14)
- ^{1} Playing statistics correct to the end of 1985.

David Twomey (born 21 February 1961) is a former Australian rules footballer who played with Collingwood in the Victorian Football League (VFL).

A member of Collingwood's famous Twomey family, David is the grandson of Bill Twomey senior and nephew of 1953 premiership players Bill, Mick and Pat.

He was recruited to Collingwood from Ivanhoe Amateurs and played his football mostly as a half back flanker. Despite appearing in the 1980 Preliminary Final win, Twomey was omitted from the Grand Final team for Ricky Barham. He did however get to play in the 1981 VFL Grand Final, performing well in a losing side. The 1981 season, was along with 1984, the only time he was able to put together regular appearances. His efforts in 1984 earned him six Brownlow Medal votes, which was the equal second most by a Collingwood player that year.
