= Arthur Gooch =

Arthur Gooch may refer to:

- Arthur Gooch (footballer) (1931–2026), Australian rules footballer
- Sir Arthur Gooch, 14th Baronet (born 1937), English baronet and retired British Army officer
- Arthur Gooch (criminal) (1909–1936), American criminal and the only person ever executed under the Lindbergh kidnapping law
