= Bruce Cummins =

Australian rules footballer

Personal information
- Full name: Bruce John Cummins
- Born: 17 November 1929
- Died: 22 August 2017 (aged 87); Ashburton
- Original team: Commonwealth Bank FC
- Height: 179 cm (5 ft 10 in)
- Weight: 73 kg (161 lb)

Playing career^{1}
| Years | Club | Games (Goals) |
| 1954 | St Kilda | 1 (0) |
- ^{1} Playing statistics correct to the end of 1954.

Bruce Cummins (17 November 1929 – 22 August 2017) was an Australian rules footballer who played with St Kilda in the Victorian Football League (VFL). Cummins began with the Commonwealth Bank FC seniors, as a 19-year-old in the amateurs. In six seasons, mainly as a defender, Bruce wore the Blue and Gold in 57 matches, scoring two goals.

Recruitment by VFL club St Kilda was short-lived, playing one game in 1954. In 1955, Cummins joined CYMS Football Association club East St Kilda CYMS for the next 3 winters, before hanging up his boots relatively young at 28. A year on, his coaching career began with the Commonwealth Bank under 19s in their inaugural season. Seven years later, including one season as the club's second-only reserves coach after Jim Carroll lead as captain-coach in the inaugural winter, Cummins retired permanently from the game aged 35. Some credit must go to Bruce for the junior premiership just two years later. For services to the Commonwealth Bank club over 13 seasons, life membership was awarded in 1963.
