= Ray Murphy =

Ray Murphy may refer to:

- Ray Murphy (footballer) (born 1935), Australian rules footballer
- Ray Murphy (American football) (1940–2023), American football coach
- Ray Murphy Jr. (1946–2010), American collegiate wrestler
- Ray Murphy (Neighbours), fictional character on Australian soap opera Neighbours
