= Vin Batchelor =

Australian rules footballer, born 1900

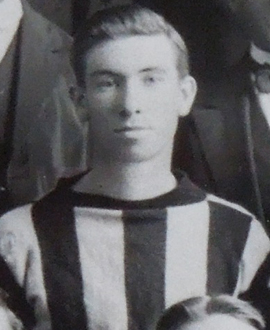
- Batchelor in 1924

Personal information
- Full name: Vincent George Batchelor
- Born: 17 February 1900; Melbourne, Victoria
- Died: 4 September 1981 (aged 81); Kew, Victoria
- Original team: Collingwood District
- Height: 179 cm (5 ft 10 in)
- Weight: 81 kg (179 lb)

Playing career^{1}
Years	Club	Games (Goals)
1924	Collingwood	2 (0)
- ^{1} Playing statistics correct to the end of 1924.

Vincent George Batchelor (17 February 1900 – 4 September 1981) was an Australian rules footballer who played with Collingwood in the Victorian Football League (VFL).

He is the father of VFL footballer Keith Vincent Batchelor (1930–2009).
