= Frank Rigaldi =

Australian rules footballer

Personal information
- Full name: Jean Frederick Rigaldi
- Born: 11 October 1893; East Melbourne, Victoria
- Died: 1 December 1970 (aged 77); Melbourne, Victoria
- Original team: Williamstown (VFA) / Carlton District
- Height: 183 cm (6 ft 0 in)
- Weight: 76 kg (168 lb)

Playing career^{1}
| Years | Club | Games (Goals) |
| 1916 | Carlton | 1 (0) |
| 1918 | Richmond | 2 (1) |
| Total | | 3 (1) |
- ^{1} Playing statistics correct to the end of 1918.

Jean Frederick "Frank" Rigaldi (11 October 1893 – 1 December 1970) was an Australian rules footballer who played with Carlton and Richmond in the Victorian Football League (VFL).

== Career ==
He was playing at Hawthorn in 1920 (the club was still in the VFA) when appointed Captain-Coach Ned Alley resigned and he captained the team for the rest of the season.
