= Vasil Varlamos =

Australian rules footballer

Personal information
- Full name: Vasil Varlamos
- Born: 17 June 1942 (age 84)
- Original team: Mentone
- Height: 178 cm (5 ft 10 in)
- Weight: 80 kg (176 lb)
- Position: Half back flank

Playing career^{1}
Years	Club	Games (Goals)
1960–64	Carlton	44 (0)
- ^{1} Playing statistics correct to the end of 1964.

Vasil Varlamos (born 17 June 1942) is a former Australian rules footballer who played for Carlton in the Victorian Football League (VFL) during the early 1960s. He is a half back flanker in the Greek Team of the Century.

Varlamos was with Carlton for five seasons and played as 19th man in the 1962 VFL Grand Final, which they lost to Essendon. A stocky half back, he was cleared to Waverley in 1965 and participated in their surprise premiership that year. He represented the VFA at the 1966 Hobart Carnival.
