= Bob Williams (Australian rules footballer) =

Australian rules footballer, born 1913

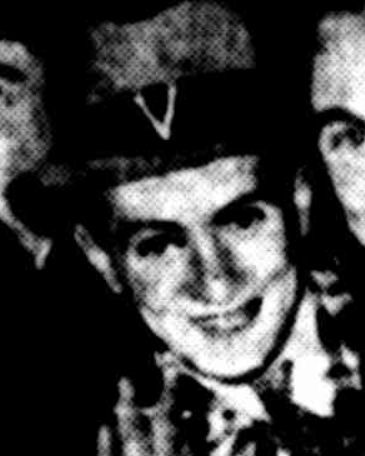

Personal information
- Full name: Robert Williams
- Born: 14 April 1913
- Died: 30 June 2004 (aged 91)
- Original team: Canterbury
- Height: 175 cm (5 ft 9 in)
- Weight: 73 kg (161 lb)

Playing career^{1}
Years	Club	Games (Goals)
1932–1944	Hawthorn	136 (110)
- ^{1} Playing statistics correct to the end of 1944.

Career highlights
- Hawthorn captain: 1943

Robert Williams (14 April 1913 – 30 June 2004) was an Australian rules footballer who played with Hawthorn in the Victorian Football League (VFL).

Used mostly on the wing or half forward flanks, Williams spent 13 years at Hawthorn, after coming to the club from Canterbury. His job as a milk carter meant he didn't feature at all in the 1933 VFL season, as his employers didn't want him playing football. He was, however, a regular fixture in the side from 1935, until his retirement in 1944.

Williams was Hawthorn's second leading goal-kicker in 1940, with 23 goals, just two behind Albert Naismith. He finished second in the goal-kicking again in the 1943 season, which he had spent as captain. Only a one-point loss in the final round of the home and away season prevented him from having the distinction of captaining the first ever Hawthorn team to compete in finals football.

== Honours and achievements ==
Individual

- Hawthorn captain: 1943
- Hawthorn life member
