= Ken Aitken =

Australian rules footballer

Personal information
- Full name: Ken Aitken
- Born: 25 June 1928
- Died: 3 June 2008 (aged 79)
- Original team: South Merlynston
- Height: 183 cm (6 ft 0 in)
- Weight: 83 kg (183 lb)

Playing career^{1}
| Years | Club | Games (Goals) |
| 1948–1951 | Carlton | 14 (0) |
| 1952 | Collingwood | 17 (1) |
| Total | | 31 (1) |
- ^{1} Playing statistics correct to the end of 1952.

Ken Aitken (25 June 1928 – 3 June 2008) was an Australian rules footballer who played with Carlton and Collingwood in the Victorian Football League (VFL).

Aitken never played more than nine games in a seasons for the seniors but was a member of Carlton's 1951 premiership team in the league seconds. He joined Collingood the following year and was a reserve in the 1952 VFL Grand Final, which they lost.

He was dropped from Collingwood's list in the pre-season and signed with the Coburg Football Club. After retiring he was coach of the Carlton Under-19s side for four years, from 1956 to 1959
