= Arthur Rademacher =

Australian rules footballer

Personal information
- Full name: George Arthur Rademacher
- Born: 27 November 1889; South Melbourne, Victoria
- Died: 26 September 1981 (aged 91); Ringwood, Victoria
- Original team: Leopold
- Height: 175 cm (5 ft 9 in)
- Weight: 76 kg (168 lb)
- Position: Defender

Playing career^{1}
Years	Club	Games (Goals)
1913–1920	South Melbourne	101 (0)
1920–1923	Hawthorn (VFA)	44 (0)

Coaching career
Years	Club	Games (W–L–D)
1933	Hawthorn	4 (1–3–0)
- ^{1} Playing statistics correct to the end of 1933.

George Arthur Rademacher (27 November 1889 – 26 September 1981) was an Australian rules footballer who played with South Melbourne in the Victorian Football League (VFL).

== Family ==
The son of John Franz Ludwig Rademacher (1862–1945), and Annie Louisa Rademacher (died 1932), née Price, George Arthur Rademacher was born in South Melbourne, Victoria on 27 November 1889. He married Annie Eva Battersby in 1918. He died in Ringwood, Victoria on 26 September 1981.

== Football ==
Rademacher, originally from Leopold (a club based in South Melbourne). He played in the side which lost the 1914 Grand Final to Carlton. He was a half back flanker in South Melbourne's 1918 premiership team.

He played the first two games for South Melbourne in 1920, bringing his total to 100 games before accepting an offer from Hawthorn (in the VFA) to step in as coach after Neddy Alley stood down. He played one last game for South before being granted a clearance to be able to play for the club he now coached. He stayed on as captain-coach for the 1921 season before handing over the position to Bill Walton.

Rademacher continued to play with Hawthorn who were competing in the VFA but had retired before Hawthorn moved to the VFL.

He stayed at the club and performed various functions around the club for many years. In 1933 he stepped in again to coach Hawthorn, when appointed coach Fred Phillips died on the eve of the season opener. He coached for four games for the solitary win before the club appointed Bill Twomey to coach for the rest of the season.
