= John Georgiou =

Australian rules footballer

Personal information
- Full name: John Georgiou
- Born: 5 October 1975 (age 51)
- Original team: Parkmore
- Height: 180 cm (5 ft 11 in)
- Weight: 80 kg (176 lb)

Playing career^{1}
Years	Club	Games (Goals)
1992–1995	St Kilda	16 (2)
1996	Norwood	23 (12)
Total		39 (14)
- ^{1} Playing statistics correct to the end of 1996.

John Georgiou (born 5 October 1975) is a former Australian rules footballer who played for St Kilda in the Australian Football League (AFL) during the 1990s.

Georgiou, recruited from Parkmore, was just 16 years and 210 days old when he made his league debut in the 1992 AFL season. St Kilda won all seven games which Georgiou played that year but he was injured and over the next three seasons could only add a further nine appearances before being delisted.

Georgiou moved to South Australian National Football League (SANFL) club Norwood for the 1996 SANFL season, making The Advertiser Team of the Year and playing in Norwood's losing Preliminary Final team.

A member of the Greek Team of the Century, Georgiou finished his career at Frankston and won the J. J. Liston Trophy in 1999. Georgiou was appointed as an assistant coach at the Sandringham Zebras (VFL) for season 2011.

Georgiou was named the coach of the Mount Eliza Football Club for the 2014. He joined the board of the Frankston Football Club in 2016, shortly before mounting debts from previous years forced the club into administration and out of the VFL.
