= John Twomey (hurler) =

Irish hurler

Personal information
- Native name: Seán Ó Túama (Irish)
- Born: 1962 (age 63–64) Finglas, County Dublin, Ireland
- Occupation: Assistant Garda Commissioner

Sport
- Sport: Hurling
- Position: Centre-back
Club
- Years: Club
- 1980s–1990s: Erin's Isle
Club titles
	Football	Hurling
Dublin titles	1	1
Inter-county*
Years	County	Apps (scores)
1982–1996	Dublin	19 (3–28)
- *Inter County team apps and scores correct as of 13 September 2015.

John Twomey (Irish: Seán Ó Túama; born 1962) is an Irish former hurler who played as a centre-back for the Dublin senior team.

Born in Finglas, County Dublin, Twomey played both hurling and Gaelic football with his local club, Erins Isle. He won a Dublin Senior Hurling Championship medal with Isles in 1983 and a Dublin Senior Football Championship medal with them in 1993. Twomey began playing with the Dublin senior hurling team in 1982 and was a key part of Lar Foley's team of the early 1990s, captaining them in two consecutive finals in the Leinster Senior Hurling Championship in 1990 and 1991. At inter-provincial level, he won a Railway Cup medal with Leinster in 1988.

== Biography ==
=== Early years ===
John was born in Finglas, North County Dublin in 1962 to Tom and Maureen Twomey. He was one of four children including a brother, Joe, and two sisters, Maeve and Wendy. John was born into a household steeped in the tradition of the Gaelic Athletic Association (GAA), particularly in the game of hurling. His father, Tom, was from the hurling stronghold of Newtownshandrum in County Cork and served as chairman of Erins Isle, while his mother, Maureen, was club secretary for a number of years. John's great-grandfather, Tommy, won an All-Ireland medal with his club, Aghabullogue, when they represented Cork in the 1890 All-Ireland final, beating Castlebridge of Wexford by 1–6 to 2–2 at Clonturk Park, Dublin. John's older brother, Joe, also played hurling and Gaelic football with Erins Isle for many years. As a result of their involvement in the GAA, John considers his brother and father to have been his biggest sporting influences growing up.

=== Personal life ===
John worked as a member of the Garda Síochána as the Deputy Commissioner for Policing and Security. He was responsible for the maintenance of national policing strategy as well as the security of the state. He was based at Garda Headquarters in Phoenix Park, Dublin.

John lives in Monkstown, Dublin with his wife, Kathleen, and their three sons, Dara, Jack and Luke. All three sons hurl with their local club, Cuala, in Dalkey. John maintains some involvement in hurling through underage coaching at Cuala.

== Playing career ==
=== Club ===
John, along with his older brother Joe, played both hurling and Gaelic football for Erin's Isle. In 1983, when John was just 21 years of age, he helped Isles win their first and only Dublin Senior Hurling Championship, beating Ballyboden St Enda's in the final. In 1990, to celebrate the centenary of their All-Ireland victory, his grandfather's club, Aghabullogue, hosted a hurling match against Castlebridge, in which John took part. John also won a Dublin Senior Football Championship with Isles in 1992, when they beat Kilmacud Crokes in a replay by 1–18 to 0–6.

=== Inter-county ===
At inter-county level, Twomey played exclusively with the Dublin hurlers. He was selected for the senior team in 1982 by the famous Dublin hurling mentor, Jimmy Boggan, who had managed Dublin to an All-Ireland Minor Hurling Championship in 1965. Twomey made his senior debut in the National Hurling League against Limerick at the Gaelic Grounds when he was only 20 years of age. In 1983, Twomey made his championship debut for Dublin when they beat Laois by 4–10 to 2–11 in Nowlan Park in the quarter-final of the Leinster Senior Hurling Championship. Dublin were well beaten in the semi-final by the famous Offaly team that had won the All-Ireland two years previously. Dublin reached the semi-final stages of the Leinster Championship again in 1984, 1986 and 1988 but failed to reach the final on each occasion. The last time a Dublin hurling team had reached a Leinster final was 1964 and they had not won it since 1961.

In 1989, the Dublin County Board appointed legendary Dublin hurler Lar Foley as manager of the Dublin hurling team. Foley had played as a corner-back with the famous Dublin team that won the Leinster Championship in 1961. When Foley took over as Dublin manager, he set out a plan to return Dublin to the top tier of Leinster hurling. The current panel had been under the guidance of Boggan for many years now and were very experienced, including the likes of Brian McMahon, Vinny Holden, MJ Ryan, Shay Boland and Peadar Carton Snr. In 1990, Twomey was selected as Dublin Captain for the first time. He was back in his fifth Leinster semi-final, this time against Wexford, who were hot favorites. However, on this occasion, Dublin were victorious, beating Wexford by 2–16 to 1–17 in Croke Park. Twomey, who played at left corner-back that day, described this game as the standout game of his career, given how close it was. This qualified Dublin for their first Leinster final in 26 years. In the final, they played Offaly at Croke Park but were beaten by 1–19 to 2–11, Twomey managing to contribute a point from the corner-back position. Aside from reaching their first Leinster final since 1964, the Dublin hurlers also received their first All Star award since 1971 that year, when Brian McMahon was awarded it for the full-forward position.

=== Inter-provincial ===
Twomey won a Railway Cup medal as a substitute with Leinster in 1988, along with fellow Dublin teammates Brian McMahon, Shane Dalton and John Treacy. This was the first Leinster team to win an inter-provincial title since 1979.

== Honours ==
=== Erin's Isle ===
- Dublin Senior Hurling Championship

Winner (1): 1983

- Dublin Senior Football Championship

Winner (1): 1995

=== Dublin ===
- Leinster Senior Hurling Championship

Runner-up (2): 1990 (c), 1991 (c)

=== Leinster ===
- Railway Cup

Winner (1): 1988
