= John Twomey =

John Twomey may refer to:

- John Twomey (runner) (1923–2025), American athlete
- John Twomey (musician) (born c. 1940), American manualist
- John Twomey (hurler) (born 1962), Irish hurler
- John Twomey (sailor) (born 1955), Irish athlete and sailor
- John Twomey (trade unionist) (born 1866), Welsh trade union leader
