= Glen Middlemiss =

Australian rules footballer (1956–2026)

- Middlemiss with Geelong in 1981

Personal information
- Full name: Glen Russell Middlemiss (Note: Middlemiss's first name is sometimes spelt Glenn, including by AFL Tables, AustralianFootball.com and some contemporary sources. An obituary for his father states the spelling is "Glen".)
- Born: 8 June 1956
- Died: 17 September 2026 (aged 70)
- Original team: Geelong West
- Height: 188 cm (6 ft 2 in)
- Weight: 90 kg (198 lb)

Playing career^{1}
Years	Club	Games (Goals)
1979–1981	Geelong	34 (29)
1981–1984	St Kilda	16 (10)
Total		50 (39)
- ^{1} Playing statistics correct to the end of 1984.

Glen Russell Middlemiss (8 June 1956 – 17 September 2026) was an Australian rules footballer who played with Geelong and St Kilda in the Victorian Football League (VFL). He was the son of Russell Middlemiss, a Geelong premiership player in 1951 and 1952.

== Biography ==
Middlemiss played his early football at Geelong West in the Victorian Football Association. While playing for Geelong West, against Williamstown in 1977, Middlemiss was knocked unconscious in an accidental collision, after which he was clinically dead for two-and-a-half minutes. The match was stopped for 20 minutes as he was attended to by trainers and a doctor, who gave him mouth-to-mouth resuscitation, cardiac massage and oxygen. Part of a fence had to be taken down so that an ambulance could come onto the field. After recovering, Middlemiss resumed his career, against doctors' advice.

A utility, Middlemiss was used mostly as a defender and up forward in his VFL career, which started at Geelong in 1979. He made 19 appearances in 1980, two of them finals, including Geelong's four point preliminary final loss to Collingwood. His most notable performance came in round eight, when he kicked seven goals against St Kilda at Kardinia Park.

During the 1981 VFL season, Middlemiss moved to St Kilda and played nine games for his new club that year. He added only seven more appearances over the next three seasons. In his last year at the club, 1984, he was suspended five times, for a total of nine games. The first was a two match ban for striking Hawthorn's Russell Morris in a reserves fixture. He then got a two match ban for striking Mark Buckley in Collingwood's round six game against Carlton. When he returned against Richmond two weeks later he was reported again, for striking opposition captain Barry Rowlings, receiving another two-week ban. He never made another senior appearance for St Kilda, but did continue to play in the reserves. It was while in the reserves that he was again made to appear before the tribunal, for striking Darren McAsey of the Sydney Swans. He had previously been warned by St Kilda that if he got suspended again he would be sacked, but the club was satisfied that in this instance he had been provoked. His last ban was for using abusive language toward a field umpire, in another reserves game, for which he got a one-week suspension.

He moved north in 1985 and began playing for Southport in the Queensland Australian Football League (QAFL). In the 1985 QAFL Grand Final against Mayne, which Southport won by three points, Middlemiss kicked the winning goal, with 68 seconds remaining. The newspaper headline the next day read " Middy's magic, Big Mick's nightmare".

Middlemiss died on 17 September 2026, at the age of 70.
