= Bob Wiltshire =

Australian rules footballer

Personal information
- Born: 24 November 1932
- Died: 12 August 2015 (aged 82)
- Original team: Foster
- Height: 192 cm (6 ft 4 in)
- Weight: 104 kg (229 lb)
- Position: Ruck

Playing career^{1}
Years	Club	Games (Goals)
1954–57	Geelong	30 (12)
1957–59	North Melbourne	36 (4)
Total		66 (16)
- ^{1} Playing statistics correct to the end of 1959.

Bob Wiltshire (24 November 1932 – 12 August 2015) was an Australian rules footballer who played with Geelong and North Melbourne in the Victorian Football League (VFL).
