= John McMahon (Australian footballer, born 1935) =

Australian rules footballer

Personal information
- Full name: John McMahon
- Born: 4 December 1935
- Died: 19 April 2002 (aged 66)
- Original team: Bairnsdale
- Height: 193 cm (6 ft 4 in)
- Weight: 94 kg (207 lb)
- Position: ruckman

Playing career^{1}
Years	Club	Games (Goals)
1953–55	Geelong	36 (11)
- ^{1} Playing statistics correct to the end of 1955.

John McMahon was a former Australian rules footballer who played with Geelong in the Victorian Football League (VFL).

A tall ruckman from Bairnsdale, he was recruited as a 17-year-old in 1953. He returned to his father's farm in Bairnsdale in 1956, after playing 36 games for Geelong in three seasons, and continued to play for Bairnsdale Football Club in the Gippsland Football League.
