= George Lakes =

Australian rules footballer

Personal information
- Born: 23 August 1949 (age 77)
- Original team: West Broken Hill
- Height: 185 cm (6 ft 1 in)
- Weight: 81 kg (179 lb)
- Position: Centre

Playing career^{1}
Years	Club	Games (Goals)
1968–72	Melbourne	49 (20)
1972	South Melbourne	6 (2)
Total		55 (22)
- ^{1} Playing statistics correct to the end of 1972.

George Lakes is a former Australian rules footballer who played with Melbourne and South Melbourne in the Victorian Football League (VFL).
