= Chris Pavlou =

Australian rules footballer

Personal information
- Full name: Christopher Peter Pavlou
- Born: 18 August 1939
- Died: 15 January 2012 (aged 72)
- Original team: Frankston
- Height: 170 cm (5 ft 7 in)
- Weight: 64 kg (141 lb)

Playing career^{1}
Years	Club	Games (Goals)
1958–1961	Carlton	31 (9)
- ^{1} Playing statistics correct to the end of 1961.

Christopher Peter Pavlou (18 August 1939 – 15 January 2012) was an Australian rules footballer who played for Carlton in the Victorian Football League between 1958 and 1961. He originally retired at age 22 after only 31 games due to a knee injury sustained when he collided with the fence.

He later moved to Launceston and took on the role of captain-coach at East Launceston in the Northern Tasmanian Football Association between 1964 and 1966. Pavlou played a few representative matches for the NTFA during those years and in 1964 played for Tasmania versus Western Australia. After suffering a further array of injuries during his time in Tasmania he retired as a player part way through the 1966 season.

Pavlou eventually returned to Carlton and coached the club's under 19s side in the 1970s.
