= Les Smith (footballer, born 1934) =

Australian rules footballer (1934–2023)

Personal information
- Full name: Leslie Charles Smith
- Born: 28 May 1934
- Died: 23 July 2023 (aged 89)
- Height: 179 cm (5 ft 10 in)
- Weight: 76 kg (168 lb)

Playing career^{1}
Years	Club	Games (Goals)
1952, 1954	Collingwood	5 (0)
- ^{1} Playing statistics correct to the end of 1954.

Leslie Charles Smith (28 May 1934 – 23 July 2023) was an Australian rules footballer who played with Collingwood in the Victorian Football League (VFL).

Smith died on 23 July 2023, at the age of 89.
