= Terry Waites =

Australian rules footballer (born 1933)

Personal information
- Full name: Terry Waites
- Born: 28 April 1933 (age 93)
- Original team: Scotch College
- Height: 182 cm (6 ft 0 in)
- Weight: 73 kg (161 lb)

Playing career^{1}
Years	Club	Games (Goals)
1953–54	Collingwood	12 (1)
- ^{1} Playing statistics correct to the end of 1954.

Terry Waites (born 28 April 1933) is a former Australian rules footballer who played for Collingwood in the Victorian Football League (VFL) during the 1950s.

A product of Scotch College, Waites was a centre half forward in Collingwood's 1953 premiership team, in just his seventh VFL match.
