= Bob Brooker =

Australian rules footballer

Personal information
- Born: 17 October 1926
- Died: 11 October 1986 (aged 59)
- Original team: Mentone
- Height: 188 cm (6 ft 2 in)
- Weight: 89 kg (196 lb)

Playing career^{1}
Years	Club	Games (Goals)
1949–1956	North Melbourne	107 (41)
- ^{1} Playing statistics correct to the end of 1956.

Career highlights
- North Melbourne best and fairest, 1955; North Melbourne captain, 1956

Bob Brooker (17 October 1926 – 11 October 1986) was an Australian rules footballer who played for North Melbourne in the Victorian Football League (VFL).
