= Brian McMahon (hurler) =

Irish hurler

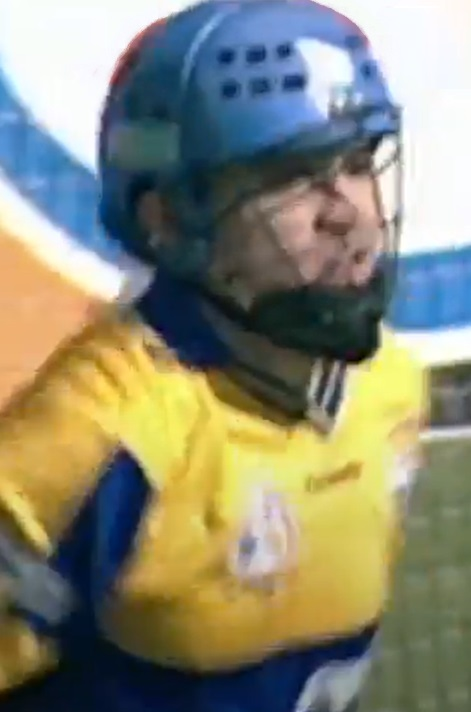
Brian McMahon Hurler c.2010

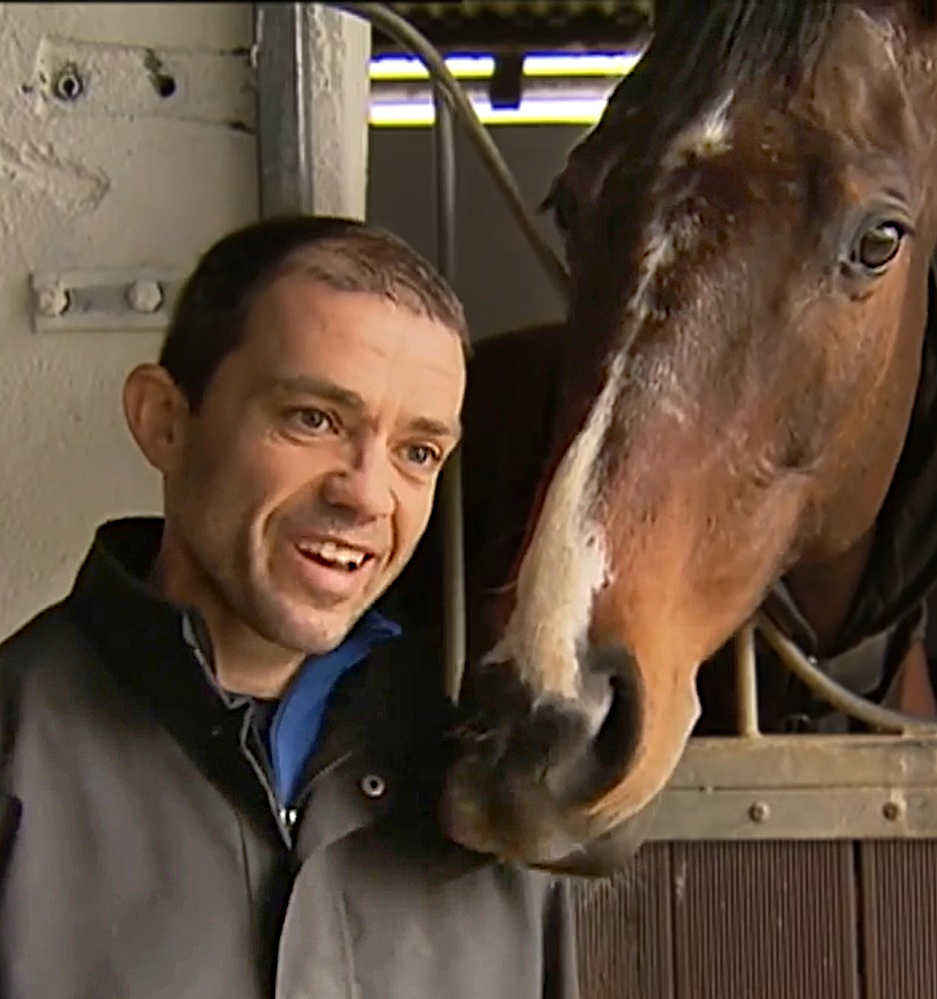
Brian McMahon - racehorse trainer 2020

Brian McMahon is an Irish sportsperson. He formerly played hurling with the Dublin senior inter-county team and won an All Star award in 1990, being picked in the full forward position. McMahon retired from hurling in 2015, and took up racehorse training.

== Racehorse training ==
McMahon moved from hurling to pursue a racehorse training career, starting in 2013 in Irish jump races. As of December 2024, he had 17 wins from 327 starts, with a total earnings of €232,055. His most successful horse being "Sé Mo Loach" in both hurdling and chasing.
