= Zeno Tzatzaris =

Australian rules footballer

Personal information
- Born: 9 May 1965 (age 61)
- Original team: Parkside
- Height: 188 cm (6 ft 2 in)
- Weight: 85 kg (187 lb)

Playing career^{1}
| Years | Club | Games (Goals) |
| 1984–1990 | Footscray | 34 (0) |
- ^{1} Playing statistics correct to the end of 1990.

Career highlights
- Party tricks

Zeno Tzatzaris (born 9 May 1965) is a former Australian rules football player.

== Playing career ==
Tzatzaris played 34 games for Footscray in the Victorian Football League between 1984 and 1990.

Knee injuries, the first of which occurred in 1985, shortened his career. One of his injuries was treated with an artificial graft shortened his career, a procedure later successfully used on Nick Malceski.
