= Joe Larkin =

Australian rules footballer

Personal information
- Full name: Joseph Cormack Larkin
- Born: 24 August 1888; South Melbourne, Victoria
- Died: 30 August 1962 (aged 74); Ballarat, Victoria

Playing career^{1}
Years	Club	Games (Goals)
1908	South Melbourne	2 (0)
- ^{1} Playing statistics correct to the end of 1908.

Joseph Cormack Larkin (24 August 1888 – 30 August 1962) was an Australian rules footballer who played with South Melbourne in the Victorian Football League (VFL).
