= Len Templar =

Australian rules footballer

Personal information
- Full name: Leonard Arthur Templar
- Born: 18 December 1930
- Died: 8 December 2023 (aged 92)
- Original team: Redan
- Height: 168 cm (5 ft 6 in)
- Weight: 64 kg (141 lb)
- Position: Wing

Playing career^{1}
Years	Club	Games (Goals)
1954–57	North Melbourne	60 (54)
- ^{1} Playing statistics correct to the end of 1957.

Leonard Arthur Templar (18 December 1930 – 8 December 2023) was an Australian rules footballer who played with North Melbourne in the Victorian Football League (VFL).
