= Doug Palmer =

Australian rules footballer (1930–1992)

Personal information
- Full name: Douglas Leslie Palmer
- Born: 23 June 1930
- Died: 23 November 1992 (aged 62); Shepparton, Victoria
- Original team: Eaglehawk
- Height: 175 cm (5 ft 9 in)
- Weight: 67 kg (148 lb)

Playing career^{1}
Years	Club	Games (Goals)
1952–1954	Geelong	57 (11)
- ^{1} Playing statistics correct to the end of 1954.

Douglas Leslie Palmer (23 June 1930 – 23 November 1992) was an Australian rules footballer who played for Geelong in the Victorian Football League (VFL) during the early 1950s.

Palmer could play as both a centreman and half back flanker. He was a midfielder in Geelong's 1952 VFL premiership side and also played in their losing 1953 VFL Grand Final team. Palmer was a good wet weather player.

Palmer was captain / coach of Myrtleford in 1955 and 1956. He was also captain / coach of the Ovens & Murray Football League representative side that lost the 1956 state championships grand final to the Ballarat Football League on the Queen Elizabeth Oval, Bendigo.
