= Bill Twomey Sr. =

Australian rules footballer

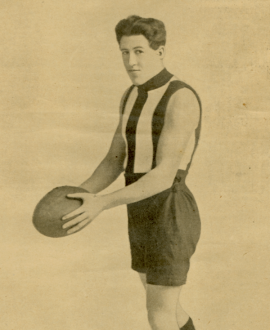
- Twomey during his Collingwood career

Personal information
- Full name: William Patrick Twomey
- Born: 14 May 1899; Heidelberg, Victoria
- Died: 25 March 1977 (aged 77); Balwyn, Victoria
- Original team: Heidelberg
- Height: 174 cm (5 ft 9 in)
- Weight: 70 kg (154 lb)

Playing career^{1}
Years	Club	Games (Goals)
1918–1922	Collingwood	54 (5)
1922-1925, 1928	Stawell	? (?)
1926-1927	South Ballarat	? (?)
1929	Nhill	? (?)
1930	South Bendigo	? (?)
1931–1932, 1938	Ararat	? (?)
1933–1934	Hawthorn	10 (0)
1935	South Melbourne Reserves	? (?)
1936	Warrnambool CYMS	? (?)
1937	Tarwin Lower	? (?)
Total		64 (5)

Coaching career
Years	Club	Games (W–L–D)
1922–1924	Stawell	? (?–?–?)
1926-1927	South Ballarat	? (?–?–?)
1930	South Bendigo	? (?–?–?)
1931–1932, 1938	Ararat	? (?–?–?)
1933–1934	Hawthorn	32 (5–27–0)
1935	South Melbourne Reserves	? (?–?–?)
1936	Warrnambool CYMS	? (?–?–?)
1937	Tarwin Lower	? (?–?–?)
- ^{1} Playing statistics correct to the end of 1934.

Career highlights
- Collingwood premiership side: 1919; Stawell Gift win: 1924; Warracknabeal Gift: 1924; Ararat Gift: 1924; Wimmera FL premiership player: Stawell FC 1925; Ballarat FL Premiership captain-coach: Sth Ballarat: 1926; Sth Gippsland FL premiership captain-coach of Tarwin Lower FC: 1937

William Patrick Twomey Sr. (14 May 1899 - 25 March 1977) was an Australian rules footballer who played for Collingwood and Hawthorn in the Victorian Football League (VFL).

== Family ==
The son of Michael Twomey and Annie Twomey, née Carey, William Patrick Twomey was born in Heidelberg, Victoria on 14 May 1899.

He married Rose Ellen Lovett (1893-1984) in 1926.

He died in Balwyn, Victoria on 25 March 1977.

Three of his four sons Mick, Pat, and Bill, and his grandson, David Twomey – the son of his fourth son, Peter – all played league football with Collingwood.

== Football ==
Twomey possessed exceptional pace and was thus used mainly as a wingman although he also played occasionally as a centreman and half back. In five seasons with Collingwood he played 54 games, including their 1919 premiership as well as in three losing grand finals. He represented Victoria in an interstate match against South Australia in 1921.

After leaving Collingwood at the end of the 1921 season, Twomey was captain-coach of Stawell in the Wimmera Football League from 1922 to 1924 and was then able to concentrate on an athletics career after being runner up in the 1919 Stawell Gift.

Remarkably, after Stawell's 1922 Wimmera Football League season had finished, Twomey and his Stawell teammate, Clyde Smith returned to Collingwood in late August for round 15, and Twomey played the last four games and two finals, including Collingwood's losing 1922 VFL grand final side.

In December 1924, Twomey accepted an offer from Ararat to be there captain-coach for 1925. Twomey later withdrew form the Ararat position to stay and play at Stawell, but the Ballarat Football League initially disqualified him for 12 months. In May 1925, Twomey's Appeal was dismissed by the VFL Appeals Board. Then in June 1925, Twomey's 12 months sentence was rescinded and he played out the season with Stawell, including their Wimmera Football League premiership.

In 1926, Twomey was appointed as captain-coach of South Ballarat and they won the premiership. In 1927, Twomey missed quite of few matches due to a knee injury, with South Ballarat losing the 1927 first semi final to Maryborough. Twomey was reappointed as South Ballarat's captain-coach in January 1928, but on the eve of the start of the season, Twomey resigned and was cleared to Stawell as a player.

In 1929, Twomey played in Nhill's losing Wimmera Football League grand final side.

Twomey then moved away from Nhill and was captain-coach of South Bendigo in 1930 and was still playing great football, with South Bendigo finishing in 6th position.

Twomey was captain-coach of Ararat in the Wimmera Football League in 1931 and 1932 which included grand final losses in 1931 and 1932.

He was also briefly a boundary umpire, officiating in three league games in early 1933.

In 1933 he joined Hawthorn as captain-coach in round five, after the sudden death of captain-coach, Fred Phillips just prior to the start of the season. Twomey then took over from interim coach, Arthur Rademacher. Hawthorn finished in 11th position for both of his seasons in charge, the latter in a non-playing capacity although he did appear in one match that year.

In 1935, Twomey was captain-coach of the South Melbourne Reserves side and also took up a position as sports and athletic coach at Mt. Carmel College, Middle Park.

In 1936, Twomey moved to Warrnambool and was captain-coach of the Warrnambool CYMS in the Purnim District Football League but they lost the grand final.

Twomey lead Tarwin Lower to a premiership in the South Gippsland Football League in 1937.

Twomey returned to Ararat in 1938 as captain-coach, with Ararat finishing in seventh position in 1938.

== Athletics ==
Twomey came of age when he was runner up in the 1919 Stawell Gift to H R Evans. Twomey later had success as a sprinter winning the 1924 Stawell Gift. Two days after his 1924 Stawell Gift win, Twomey won the Warracknabeal Gift. Twomey later on won the Ararat Gift in December 1924.

In 1938, Twomey took up sprint coaching and had a very promising runner, Paul Buckley under his guidance, who went onto win a number of gifts, including the 1940 Bessiebelle Gift, 1940 Casterton Gift and the 1940 Shepparton Gift and was one of the favourites to win the Stawell Gift in 1938 and 1940.
