= Bill McMaster =

Australian rules footballer and coach (1930–2025)

Bill McMaster OAM

Personal information
- Full name: Cyril McMaster
- Born: 30 January 1930
- Died: 7 January 2025 (aged 94)
- Original team: Lake Bolac
- Height: 192 cm (6 ft 4 in)
- Weight: 82 kg (181 lb)

Playing career^{1}
Years	Club	Games (Goals)
1951–1954	Geelong	61 (75)

Coaching career
Years	Club	Games (W–L–D)
1971–1972	Geelong	44 (12–32–0)
- ^{1} Playing statistics correct to the end of 1954.

Career highlights
- Geelong premiership player 1951, 1952

Cyril "Bill" McMaster OAM (30 January 1930 – 7 January 2025) was an Australian rules footballer and a coach in the Victorian Football League (VFL).

McMaster was awarded the Medal of the Order of Australia (OAM) in the 2024 Australia Day Honours for services to Australian Rules football in the Barwon South Western Region.

== Early life ==
Bill McMaster attended school at St. Joseph's College in Geelong where he was a prominent member of the college first 18 football team. He returned home to Lake Bolac in 1947 at sixteen years of age and began playing for his home club, The Lake Bolac Football Club. That year they finished runners up in the Mininera and District League Grand Final to Westmere Rovers, and in the following three years went on to win back-to-back-to-back Premierships in 1948, 1949 and 1950. Bill was awarded Best and Fairest for Lake Bolac in 1949.

In 1950 McMaster also played in the Wimmera Football League for Ararat Football Club, on permit from Lake Bolac, under former Fitzroy coach Clen Denning. Both teams progressed to their respective League Grand Finals.

Due to his standout season, in which 20 year old McMaster won Fairest and Best in the Ararat region, he gained the attention of VFL team, Geelong Football Club, who offered him a position at the club for the next year which he accepted. He was invited to train with Geelong for the remainder of the 1950 season but decided to see out the year at Ararat.

== VFL career ==
=== 1951 ===
At Geelong, McMaster was given the number seven guernsey, previously worn by Lindsay White, and in his first game for the club McMaster kicked five goals and gave an "encouraging display of pace to the ball". Throughout that year he played in the ruck and was one of Geelong's best players. Geelong progressed to the Grand Final and McMaster was fortunate enough to play in a VFL League Grand Final in his first year. Geelong beat Essendon by eleven points at the MCG, handing the club their first Premiership since 1937, Geelong 11.15 (81) Essendon 10:10 (70). That evening the team arrived back in Geelong at City Hall and were honoured in front of 10,000 to 12,000 fans.

=== 1952 ===
1952 was another successful year for Geelong with the win of a second successive Premiership. McMaster won the club's Most Improved Player for the season. It was during this period that Geelong appeared unbeatable when they played in 26 games without loss. This spanned from the ninth game of 1952 to the thirteenth game of 1953. A record that still stands.

=== 1953 ===
The 1953 season opened with the unfurling of the 1952 premiership pennant at Kardinia Park. Football fever gripped the city as Geelong set their eyes on another premiership. They met Collingwood in the Grand Final and McMaster was playing well before an injury in the third quarter. He left the ground with a bruised kidney and concussion and was taken to St Vincent's hospital then later transferred to the Geelong Hospital. This effectively ended McMaster's VFL career because, although he attempted to resume in 1954, his injury proved too incapacitating and after just 61 games in four seasons, he retired.

== Country Football career ==
McMaster became one of many footballers to return to Victorian Country Football after a VFL/AFL career. He returned home to Lake Bolac where he captained and coached his local side to two consecutive Premierships in 1955 and 1956. Shortly after, Mortlake Football Club poached him with the position of player-coach which he held from 1957 to 1963.

During his last year at Mortlake, he was approached by the Hampden Football League to coach the combined country teams of the Hampden Football League. From 1963 to 1966 he had success which culminated in winning the 1966 Victorian Country Championship Grand Final. Hampden League defeated Ovens Murray League 14.7 (91) - 12.16 (88).

== Post-playing career ==
McMaster returned to Geelong Football Club as non-playing coach in 1971–2 with 12 wins and 32 losses. He was appointed Recruiting Officer in 1973 which was the first such paid position held at any VFL club. He remained in this role until his retirement in 1994.

He was a Life Member of the Geelong Football Club, member of the G.F.C. Past Players Association, recipient of the G.F.C. R.J. Hickey Award in 1993, AFL Jack Titus Service Award in 1994 and Australian Sports Medal in 2000.

Thereafter he took on voluntary roles at the G.F.C. with positions of the History and Tradition Committee President, Member and Tour Guide 1994-2006 and member of the Honouring the Past Committee and Memorabilia Working Group, 1994–2015.

== Death ==
McMaster died on 7 January 2025, at the age of 94.
