= Ron Kingston =

Australian rules footballer

Personal information
- Born: 10 October 1931
- Died: 15 March 1997 (aged 65)
- Original team: Preston Juniors
- Height: 179 cm (5 ft 10 in)
- Weight: 79 kg (174 lb)

Playing career^{1}
Years	Club	Games (Goals)
1950–1959	Collingwood	173 (7)
- ^{1} Playing statistics correct to the end of 1959.

Career highlights
- Collingwood premiership side 1953

Ron Kingston (10 October 1931 – 15 March 1997) was an Australian rules footballer, who played in the Victorian Football League (VFL). He was a member of what the historian Manning Clark called “that great half-back line of Lucas, Kingston, and Tuck”. His spring and high-marking ability allowed him to hold the key position of center-half-back, even though he was 4 cm shorter than either of his flankers, Lucas and Tuck.
