= Russell Middlemiss =

Australian rules footballer (1929–2019)

Personal information
- Born: 6 July 1929
- Died: 5 August 2019 (aged 90); Geelong, Victoria
- Original team: Rokewood
- Height: 182 cm (6 ft 0 in)
- Weight: 77 kg (170 lb)

Playing career^{1}
Years	Club	Games (Goals)
1949–1955	Geelong	74 (2)
- ^{1} Playing statistics correct to the end of 1955.

Russell Middlemiss (6 July 1929 – 5 August 2019), who grew up in a Ballarat orphanage was an Australian rules footballer who played with Geelong in the VFL during the early 1950s. Middlemiss was a half back flanker and was an important player in defence for Geelong in their back to back VFL premiership triumphs in 1951 and 1952.

His son, Glen Middlemiss, also played for Geelong, as well as St Kilda.
