= George Hams =

Australian rules footballer (1928–2023)

Personal information
- Full name: George Edward Hams
- Born: 29 July 1928
- Died: 2 February 2023 (aged 94)
- Original team: Ivanhoe Amateurs
- Height: 173 cm (5 ft 8 in)
- Weight: 76 kg (168 lb)
- Position: Defender

Playing career^{1}
Years	Club	Games (Goals)
1948–55	Collingwood	108 (3)
- ^{1} Playing statistics correct to the end of 1955.

George Edward Hams (29 July 1928 – 2 February 2023) was an Australian rules footballer who played for Collingwood in the Victorian Football League (VFL).

Hams was at Collingwood during a strong period for the club and participated in ten finals matches. Two of those were Grand Finals, back to back in 1952 and 1953, with the latter resulting in a premiership. He was seen mostly in the back pocket and retired in 1956 to pursue an engineering career.

Hams died on 2 February 2023, at the age of 94.
