= Lou Richards =

Australian rules footballer (1923–2017)

Personal information
- Full name: Lewis Thomas Charles Richards
- Nicknames: Lou, Louie the Lip
- Born: 15 March 1923; Collingwood, Victoria, Australia
- Died: 8 May 2017 (aged 94); Windsor, Victoria, Australia
- Original team: Abbotsford
- Height: 170 cm (5 ft 7 in)
- Weight: 73 kg (161 lb)

Playing career^{1}
Years	Club	Games (Goals)
1941–1955	Collingwood	250 (423)

Representative team honours
Years	Team	Games (Goals)
	Victoria	3 (9)
- ^{1} Playing statistics correct to the end of 1955.

Career highlights
- Collingwood premiership captain 1953; All-Australian Team of the Year 1947, 1948; Collingwood leading goalkicker 1944, 1948, 1950; Collingwood captain 1952–1955; Australian Football Hall of Fame, inducted 1996; Collingwood Hall of Fame, inducted 2004

Lewis Thomas Charles "Lou" Richards MBE (15 March 1923 – 8 May 2017) was an Australian rules footballer who played 250 games for the Collingwood Football Club in the Victorian Football League (VFL) between 1941 and 1955. He captained the team from 1952 to 1955, including a premiership win in 1953. He later became a hotel manager and a highly prominent sports journalist in print, radio and television for more than 50 years, and he was known for his wit and vivacity.

== Playing career ==
Born in Collingwood, Victoria, Richards' passion for Collingwood grew out of family connections—he followed in the footsteps of his grandfather Charlie Pannam and uncles Charles and Alby Pannam, both former Magpie players. His brother Ron Richards also played for the club. The Richards–Pannam dynasty made Collingwood the only club to have been captained by three generations of the one family. As a family, they played over 1,200 games between them.

Recognised for his skill and toughness, Richards played as a rover, resting in the forward pocket.

He was captain of the club for four years, including Collingwood's 1953 premiership team. Additionally, he represented Victoria on three occasions in State of Origin matches.

== Post-playing career ==
After his retirement from football, Richards managed a number of Melbourne hotels, including the well-known Phoenix Hotel in Flinders Street, whose regular customers included journalists from the nearby Herald and Weekly Times.

Richards also had a long career in the media, beginning as a sport journalist for The Argus and later The Sun News-Pictorial, where he gained the nickname of "Louie the Lip". He was a very popular commentator on both radio and television, the latter on Channel 7 with his great mates Jack Dyer and Bob Davis. He also appeared on the popular World of Sport program. In the 1990s and 2000s, he made regular appearances on both The Footy Show and the Sunday Footy Show.

His radio career commenced just after his retirement in 1955, when he teamed up with Jack Dyer as 3XY's commentary team. In 1959, he transferred to 3DB, where, as well as being a football commentator, he participated in sports panels and for four years teamed up with well-known DB personality Dick Cranbourne to host the station's breakfast program.

As a football tipster, Richards was known as a Kiss of Death and regularly backed up his tips with famous dares: "I'll cut Teddy Whitten's lawn with nail scissors" or "I'll jump off St Kilda pier."

In 1972, Richards was appointed Court Jester to King of Moomba Johnny Farnham and was the King of Moomba himself in 1981.

In 1989, he released a memoir, The Kiss of Death: Memoirs of a Sporting Legend; an updated version was released in 2012, entitled Lou: My Wonderful Life.

At the end of 2008, Richards retired from hosting the handball segment on the Sunday Footy Show, and he subsequently made only occasional public appearances. His final public appearance was on the 2010 AFL Grand Final edition of The Footy Show; his beloved Collingwood won the grand final replay after drawing against St Kilda in the last-ever drawn grand final.

== Honours ==
Richards was made a Member of the Order of the British Empire in 1981, received an Australian Sports Medal in 2000, and was awarded a Centenary Medal in 2001. In 1996, Richards was inducted into the Australian Football Hall of Fame; in 2004, he was named as the captain of the Greek Team of the Century, due to his Greek heritage, and was inducted into the Collingwood Hall of Fame. He was inducted into the Sport Australia Hall of Fame in 2008.

Additionally, a statue was dedicated in his honour on 17th April, 2014.

== Personal life ==
Richards married Edna Lillian Bowie in 1948; the couple had two daughters. Edna was admitted into care with dementia in 2005. She died, aged 87, in March 2008.

On 8 May 2017, Richards died at his nursing home in the Melbourne suburb of Windsor at the age of 94. The Richards family accepted the Victorian Government's offer of a state funeral, which took place at St. Paul's Anglican Cathedral on 17 May 2017.

He is the Great-Uncle of Western Bulldogs player, Ed Richards.

== State funeral ==
Richards' funeral was attended by many prominent politicians, footballers, coaches, media personalities, family, and friends. Prominent people who paid their respects included Nathan Buckley, Garry Lyon, Billy Brownless, Ron Barassi, Rex Hunt, Kevin Sheedy, Bob Skilton, Mick Malthouse, Peter McKenna, and Eddie McGuire, who was one of Lou's eulogisers. Labor leader Bill Shorten, Victorian senator Derryn Hinch, and bosses of the AFL were also among those gathered. Additionally, the 2017 Collingwood team formed a guard of honour for Richards.

At the funeral, Richards' daughter Nicole Morrison spoke of Lou's loyalty to his team and his family, and she spoke of her appreciation for all of the messages of love and support from all over the world; she joked that "he would be humbled by this response—but only for a short time". Grandson Ned Morrison told how each descendant had a dawning moment when they realised Lou was famous. For his sister, Lucy, it was at school pick-up one day, where Lou was mobbed. Ned said, "The trouble for Lucy was that her grandfather was more appealing to the teenage boys at her school than she was."

Former North Melbourne chief executive and administrative Hall of Famer Ron Joseph used his eulogy to speak of Lou Richards' own thoughts for his funeral: "Lou was right. He told me his farewell would be bigger than Texas. He also told me that I’d have to speak at his funeral. "'All the other people I know are dead,' he said."

Joseph continued to relay Richards' own self-eulogy: "You better start thinking about what you are going to say, because it will be a bloody big funeral. Harold Holt’s will have nothing on mine. I had a house down at Portsea near him, you know. He didn’t drown. He took off with a sheila.

"It will be a state funeral, just like his. So that’ll give Jock [McHale], Jack [Dyer] and Bobby Davis the shits."

Due to Lou feeling underpaid at his time with Channel Seven, Joseph added on Richards' behalf: "Tell Nicole and Kim to make sure they get a good quid for the television rights. If Seven are covering it, tell the girls to charge double." Amusingly, Channel 7 broadcast the funeral.

Joseph continued reading Richards' self-eulogy: "EJ’s was a state funeral, too. I’m bigger than Ted ever was. I nicknamed him Mr Football, and he believed it for the rest of his life.

"I called Barassi Mrs football, too. Of all the blokes I've nicknamed over the years, Barassi is about the only one that ever lived up to his moniker.

"And if that Mike Fitzpatrick is at my funeral—you know, the bloke who used to play for Carlton, the Rhodes Scholar. Rhodes Scholar, my bum!

"Tell him I said that he spent too much time at Oxford and Cambridge and can't recognise a legend when he sees one."

== Discography ==
=== Singles ===
List of singles, with selected chart positions
Title	Year	Peak chart positions
Title	Year	AUS
"Up There Cazaly '91" (as Louis the Lip)	1991	105
