= Ray Murphy (footballer) =

Australian rules footballer

Personal information
- Full name: Ray Murphy
- Born: 14 July 1935 (age 91)
- Original team: Redan
- Height: 189 cm (6 ft 2 in)
- Weight: 89 kg (196 lb)

Playing career^{1}
Years	Club	Games (Goals)
1957–58	North Melbourne	20 (3)
- ^{1} Playing statistics correct to the end of 1958.

Ray Murphy (born 14 July 1935) is a former Australian rules footballer who played with North Melbourne in the Victorian Football League (VFL).
