= Jack Finck =

Australian rules footballer (1930–2012)

Personal information
- Full name: Jack Finck
- Born: 21 January 1930
- Died: 31 October 2012 (aged 82)
- Original team: Heathmere
- Height: 184 cm (6 ft 0 in)
- Weight: 80 kg (176 lb)
- Position: Defender

Playing career^{1}
Years	Club	Games (Goals)
1951–54	Collingwood	53 (8)
- ^{1} Playing statistics correct to the end of 1954.

Jack Finck (21 January 1930 – 31 October 2012) was an Australian rules footballer who played for Collingwood in the Victorian Football League (VFL) during the early 1950s.

Finck, who Collingwood recruited from Heathmere, was a key position defender. As a result, he kicked just eight goals in his career but half of them came in a single match, when he helped his side to defeat Carlton at Princes Park in 1953. Later that year, Finck, having missed out on a premiership in 1952 when Collingwood lost the Grand Final, got another opportunity when he was their full-back in the team which defeated Geelong in the decider.

After just four seasons and despite being aged just 24, Finck retired, citing the long commute from Portland for home games.
