= Ron Richards (footballer, born 1928) =

Australian rules footballer and coach

Personal information
- Full name: Ronald Arthur Richards
- Born: 11 May 1928; Collingwood, Victoria
- Died: 20 September 2013 (aged 85)
- Original team: Collingwood Tech
- Debut: 28 June 1947, Collingwood vs. North Melbourne, at Victoria Park
- Height: 170 cm (5 ft 7 in)
- Weight: 73 kg (161 lb)

Playing career^{1}
Years	Club	Games (Goals)
1947–1956	Collingwood	143 (114)

Coaching career
Years	Club	Games (W–L–D)
1974	Collingwood	2 (2–0–0)
- ^{1} Playing statistics correct to the end of 1956.

Career highlights
- Collingwood premiership side 1953

Ronald Arthur Richards (11 May 1928 – 20 September 2013) was an Australian rules footballer, who played in the Victorian Football League (VFL).

Recruited from Collingwood Technical School, as was his brother Lou, Ron Richards enjoyed a productive VFL career with Collingwood.

He starred on a wing in the 1953 Grand Final defeat of Geelong, but he could also rove, and was known to be a fierce tackler in the backlines.

He left the club to captain-coach the Metropolitan League's East Hawthorn, his team won the first 32 games he coached, including the 1957 premiership.

He returned to Collingwood as coach of the under-19s in 1964. He would later coach the reserves and the seniors for two games. Richards served on the committee for many years.

Richards died following illness in 2013, aged 85.

He is the grandfather of Ed Richards.
