= Arthur Gooch (footballer) =

Australian rules footballer (1931–2026)

Personal information
- Born: 20 March 1931
- Died: 23 February 2026 (aged 94)
- Original teams: Preston Boys Club, Melbourne
- Height: 188 cm (6 ft 2 in)
- Weight: 90 kg (198 lb)

Playing career
Years	Club	Games (Goals)
1950–1956	Collingwood	76 (12)

Career highlights
- Collingwood premiership side 1953

Arthur James Gooch (20 March 1931 – 23 February 2026) was an Australian rules footballer, who played in the Victorian Football League, (VFL).

Gooch played for Collingwood between 1950 and 1956. Gooch was a member of the Magpies' winning grand final team against Geelong in 1953.

He played with Box Hill in the VFA in 1957 and 1958. In all, he played 31 games and scored 4 goals for Box Hill and won the club's Best and Fairest in 1958.

Gooch died on 23 February 2026, at the age of 94.
