= Norm Sharp =

Australian rules footballer

Personal information
- Born: 23 June 1934
- Died: 8 October 2014 (aged 80)
- Original team: Camperdown
- Height: 185 cm (6 ft 1 in)
- Weight: 94 kg (207 lb)

Playing career^{1}
Years	Club	Games (Goals)
1952–1957	Geelong	88 (29)
- ^{1} Playing statistics correct to the end of 1957.

Norm Sharp (23 June 1934 – 8 October 2014) was an Australian rules footballer who played with Geelong in the Victorian Football League during the 1950s.

A ruckman, Sharp was a premiership player in his debut season in 1952 and won a best and fairest two years later. A knee injury caused him to retire prematurely at the age of just 23.
