= Bill Rose (footballer) =

Australian rules footballer

Personal information
- Full name: William John Rose
- Born: 9 May 1931; Nyah West, Victoria
- Died: 10 October 2007 (aged 76); Shepparton, Victoria
- Original team: Nyah West
- Height: 189 cm (6 ft 2 in)
- Weight: 80 kg (176 lb)
- Positions: Follower, defender

Playing career^{1}
Years	Club	Games (Goals)
1950–1955	Collingwood	40 (3)
- ^{1} Playing statistics correct to the end of 1955.

William John Rose (9 May 1931 – 10 October 2007) was an Australian rules footballer who played for Collingwood in the Victorian Football League (VFL) during the early 1950s.

Rose was a follower in Collingwood's 1953 premiership side, having been a back pocket in the team which lost the Grand Final a year earlier.

His brothers, Bob, Kevin and Ralph were also Collingwood players.
