= Ted Alley =

Australian rules footballer (1881–1949)

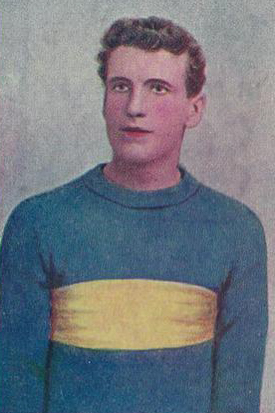
- Cigarette card of Alley in 1905

Personal information
- Full name: Edwin John Alley
- Born: 30 July 1881; St Arnaud, Victoria
- Died: 18 July 1949 (aged 67); Canterbury, Victoria
- Original team: Footscray Juniors
- Height: 173 cm (5 ft 8 in)
- Weight: 71 kg (157 lb)

Playing career^{1}
Years	Club	Games (Goals)
1902–1903	South Melbourne	16 (2)
- ^{1} Playing statistics correct to the end of 1903.

Career highlights
- AIF Pioneer Exhibition Game, London, 28 October 1916

Edwin John Alley (30 July 1881 – 18 July 1949) was an Australian rules footballer who played with South Melbourne in the Victorian Football League (VFL). Some AFL sources list his name as Ned Alley.

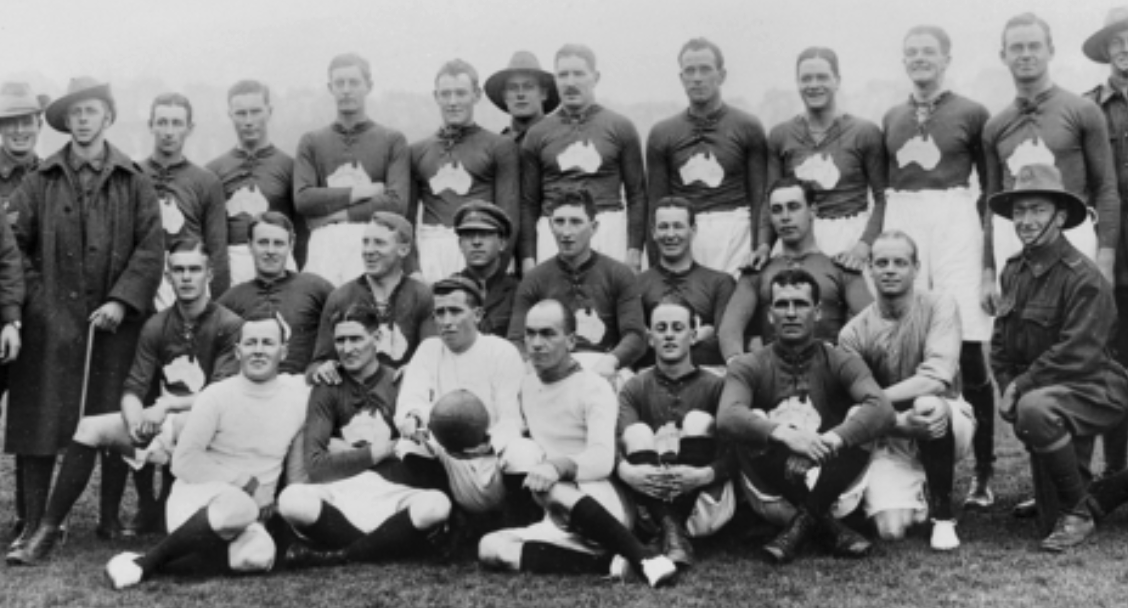
The Third Australian Divisional Team: 28 October 1916. Ted Alley is the third player from left, front row.

== Football ==
=== South Melbourne (VFL) ===
Alley appeared in 15 of South Melbourne 17 games in the 1902 VFL season. He played just once the following year.

=== Williamstown (VFA) ===
He transferred to Williamstown in the VFA in 1905 and played 160 games and kicked 20 goals up until when the First World War intervened in 1915. In 1907, with regular captain Paddy Noonan having stood down, Alley captained Williamstown to an 18-point grand final victory over West Melbourne, in the Victorian Football Association. This gave him the distinction of being Williamstown's first ever premiership captain.

He also served as captain-coach for part of 1911 after Bert Amy resigned and as captain in 1915.

=== Third Australian Divisional Team (First AIF) ===
He played for the (winning) Third Australian Divisional team in the famous "Pioneer Exhibition Game" of Australian Rules football, held in London, in October 1916. A news film was taken at the match.

=== Hawthorn (VFA) ===
After returning from the War, he went to Hawthorn in the VFA in 1919. In 1920 he was appointed captain-coach, but stood down midway through the season. Alley was still playing football with Mitcham in 1924 at the age of 43.

== Military service ==
Alley served overseas with the 3rd Pioneer Battalion during World War I.

== Later life ==
Alley, who made his living as an engineer, worked for 40 years in the railway workshops at Newport until retiring in 1946.

Edwin Alley died at his Canterbury, Victoria residence on 18 July 1949.

== See also ==
- 1916 Pioneer Exhibition Game
