= Bill Twomey Jr. =

Australian rules footballer

Bill Twomey
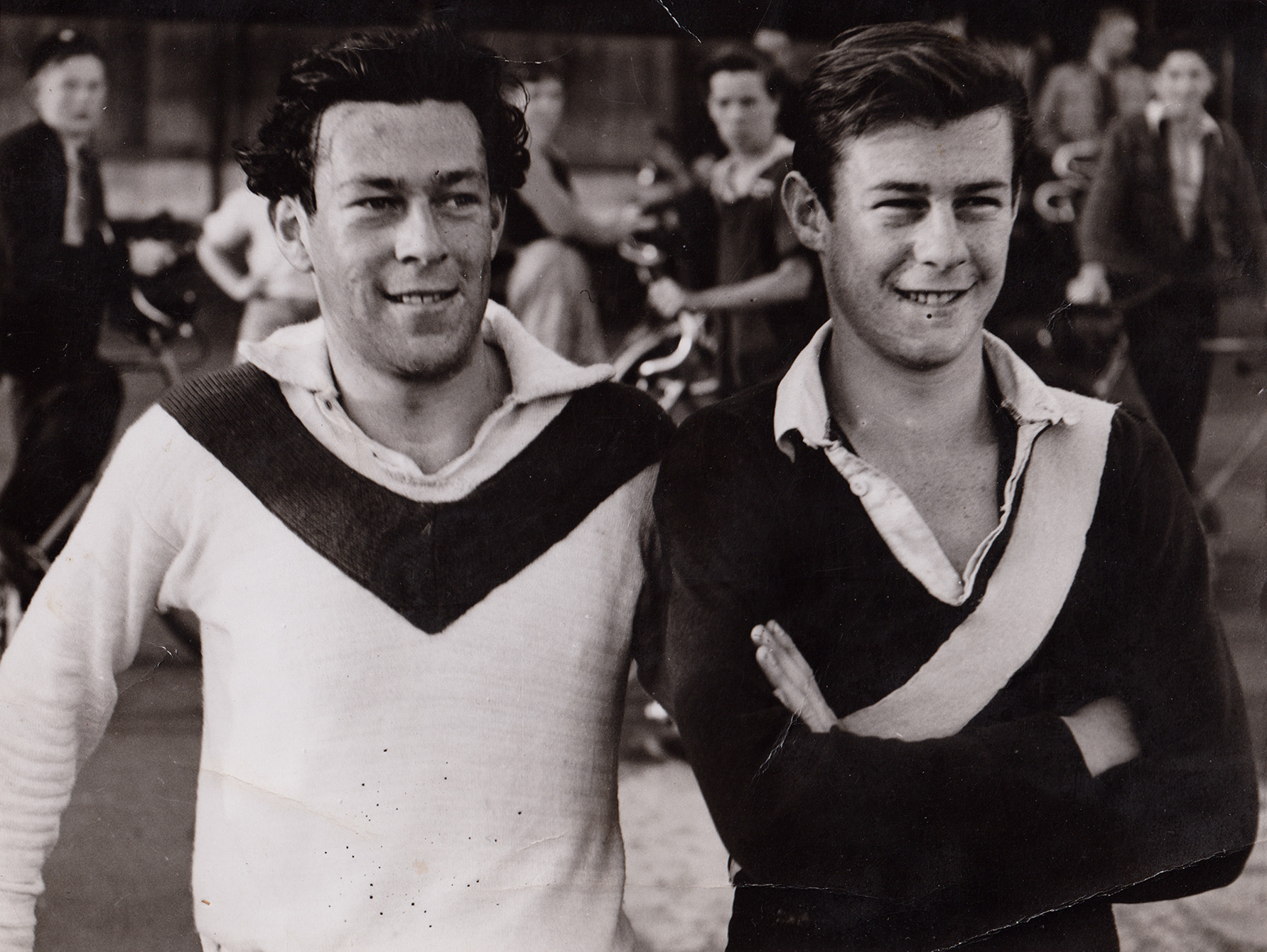
- Bill (left) with brother Pat at training (c.1947)

Personal information
- Full name: William Joseph Twomey
- Born: 28 September 1927
- Died: 1 October 1996 (aged 69)
- Original teams: St Thomas', Fairfield YCW
- Debut: Round 1 1945, Collingwood vs. North Melbourne, at Victoria Park
- Height: 179 cm (5 ft 10 in)
- Weight: 76 kg (168 lb)

Playing career^{1}
Years	Club	Games (Goals)
1945–1958	Collingwood	189 (154)
- ^{1} Playing statistics correct to the end of 1958.

Career highlights
- VFL Premiership player: 1953; Copeland Trophy 1956; R. T. Rush Trophy 1946; J.J. Joyce Trophy 1948; Collingwood Captain 1957; Collingwood Life Member 1955; Collingwood Hall of Fame; 7 x Victorian Representative; Sporting Life Team of the Year: 1948

Bill Twomey Jr. (28 September 1927 – 1 October 1996) was an Australian rules footballer, who played in the Victorian Football League (VFL).

Often described as an "enigma", Twomey was, for a time, considered the best centreman in the game. He combined freakish natural talent with exceptional speed, a vice-like grip and spectacular leap. His often perplexing career can be summed up by a three-week stretch during the latter part of the 1948 season. Twomey, having gone unsighted during the first half of Collingwood's semi-final clash versus Footscray, kicked 8 goals in the second half to single-handedly win the match for the Magpies. Such was his impact the Sporting Globe declared Twomey "their greatest match-winning forward since Ron Todd". Two weeks later the star Magpie had little to no influence in Collingwood's Preliminary final loss to Melbourne.

Twomey played 189 games for the Magpies over 14 seasons in a career that spanned a Copeland Trophy in 1956, Premiership glory in 1953, captaincy in 1957 and regular selection for Victoria. His time as a Magpie however was ultimately dogged by niggling injuries as well as personal setbacks, during an era when little thought was given to the mental welfare of footballers.

Bill's brother Michael played 157 games for the Woods between 1951 and 1961, while Pat had two brief stints with the club which amounted to 55 games. The three brothers' nephew David – the son of a fourth brother, Peter Twomey – later played with the Magpies. Bill's father Bill Twomey Sr. had also played with them during the 1920s.
