= Pat Twomey =

Australian rules footballer

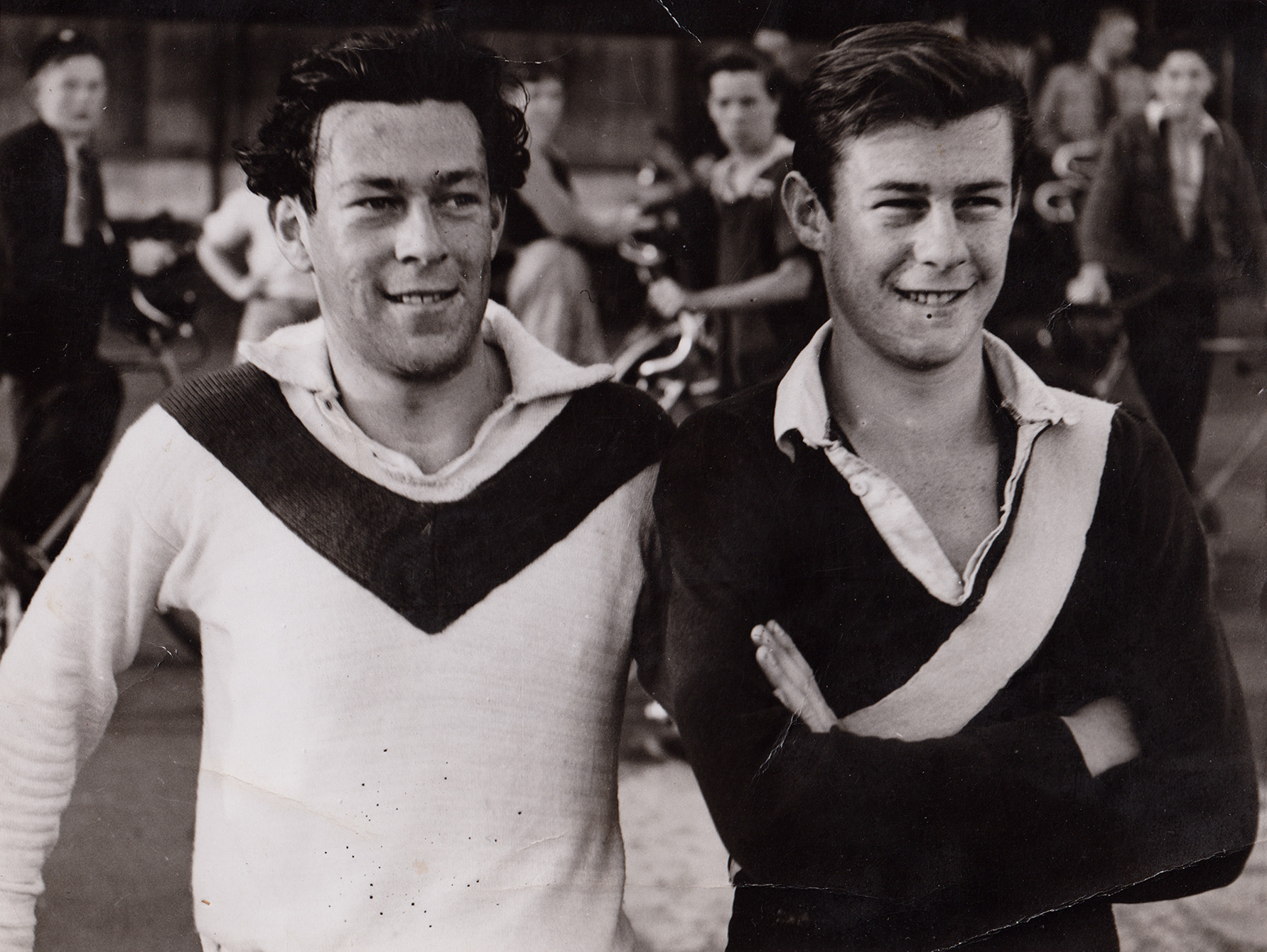
- Pat (right) with brother Bill at training (c.1947)

Personal information
- Born: 2 April 1929
- Died: 22 November 1969 (aged 40)
- Original team: Heidelberg
- Height: 179 cm (5 ft 10 in)
- Weight: 72 kg (159 lb)

Playing career^{1}
Years	Club	Games (Goals)
1947–49; 1952–53	Collingwood	55 (49)
- ^{1} Playing statistics correct to the end of 1953.

Career highlights
- Collingwood premiership side 1953

Patrick Twomey (2 April 1929 – 22 November 1969) was an Australian rules footballer, who played in the Victorian Football League (VFL).

== Family ==
The son of the Collingwood footballer and 1924 Stawell Gift winner, Bill Twomey Sr., and Rose Ellen Twomey, née Lovett, Patrick Twomey was born on 2 April 1929. Two of his three brothers, Bill Twomey Jr., and Mick Twomey, also played for Collingwood.

He married Pauline Anne Hogan on 12 November 1952.

== Football ==
=== Collingwood (VFL) ===
Pat Twomey joined Collingwood in 1947. He had two stints with the Magpies, separated by a spell with the Warragul Football Club in the Central Gippsland Football League.

Twomey mainly played across the centreline or on a flank and started as a winger. He was tough, fast, and was a tireless contributor in his appearances for Collingwood, with a long driving left-foot kick and a good mark.

His last game for Collingwood was in the 1953 Grand Final. He was on the half-forward flank, his older brother, Bill, was the centre, and his younger brother, Mick, was second ruck, resting in the forward pocket. The team won the premiership.

He retired, on medical advice, before the 1954 season.

== Death ==
He died on 22 November 1969.
