= Fred Phillips (footballer) =

Australian rules footballer (1905–1933)

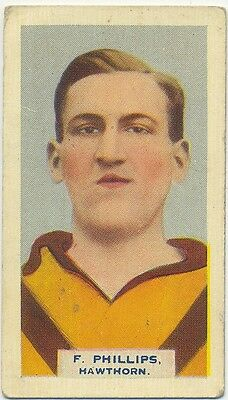

Personal information
- Full name: Frederick Rowden Phillips
- Born: 27 May 1905; Richmond, Victoria
- Died: 21 April 1933 (aged 27); Glenferrie, Victoria
- Original team: Scotch College
- Height: 183 cm (6 ft 0 in)
- Weight: 74 kg (163 lb)

Playing career^{1}
Years	Club	Games (Goals)
1924–1932	St Kilda	134 (107)
- ^{1} Playing statistics correct to the end of 1932.

Frederick Rowden "Flops" Phillips (27 May 1905 – 21 April 1933) was an Australian rules footballer who played with St Kilda in the Victorian Football League (VFL).

== Family ==
The son of Frederick John Edmonds Phillips (1859–1931), and Sylvia Amy Phillips (1870–1950), née Rowden, Frederick Rowden Phillips was born in Richmond, Victoria on 27 May 1905. He was born with a "hare lip".

== Education ==
He was educated at Laing's Prahran College, and, later, at Scotch College, Melbourne, where he excelled at both cricket and football.

== Football ==
Fred Phillips was a highly skilled and stylish footballer; and was said to be a strong overhead mark. Standing at 183 cm, Fred could hold down key positions in defence or attack. He had an added advantage, over many footballers of that era, because he could kick proficiently with both feet.
In those early days of football, many players were "branded" as "one-sided" which meant that they turned the same way on each occasion when winning possession of the ball. Such players were/are "predictable and therefore vulnerable" with close checking.

=== St Kilda (VFL) ===
Phillips could play as a ruckman or in defensive key positions. A strong mark of the ball, Phillips was St Kilda's best and fairest in 1930. He finished eighth in the 1931 Brownlow Medal, and equal 9th the following season.

=== Hawthorn (VFL) ===
In early March 1933 he was appointed to the role of Hawthorn captain-coach but by the time the season began a few weeks later he had died from blood poisoning caused by an elbow cut. It was believed the dye in the new club jumper was toxic.

== Interstate football ==
Originally selected as 19th man for the Victorian team to play against South Australia at the MCG on 11 June 1932, Phillips replaced Collingwood's Frank Murphy in the selected side. Victoria beat South Australia by 8 points — 12.20 (92) to 12.12 (84 — and Phillips was one of the best on the ground; and, along with Richmond's Frank Titus, he scored three goals.

== Death ==
He died in a private hospital in Glenferrie, Victoria on 21 April 1933. The prevailing view is that he died from blood poisoning, caused by the (toxic) dye from his Hawthorn jumper running into a cut on his elbow.

=== Funeral ===
Phillips was buried on Monday, 24 April 1933 at the Melbourne General Cemetery. A large crowd followed his coffin's journey to the cemetery.

A great tribute to the memory of the late St Kilda player and recently appointed coach of the Hawthorn Football Club, was paid by a crowd of 1500 which attended the burial service in the Melbourne Cemetery today. Mr Phillips, who had played for St. Kilda for nine seasons, and also represented Victoria in Interstate contests, died suddenly on Friday night, aged 27.
Almost every football and cricket organisation in Melbourne was officially represented. There was a large representation of present and past players, committeemen, coaches, secretaries and supporters of every league football club, and friends and relatives. In the crowd was a big sprinkling of women.
The funeral moved from the residence at 10 Meadow Street, East St. Kilda, of Mrs S. A. Phillips, the dead man's mother. Three-quarters of a mile long, it passed round the St. Kilda football Ground where the flags were at half mast, and passed by way of Queen's Road and St. Kilda Road, through the city, to the cemetery. More than 200 cars followed the hearse. The Riverine Herald, 25 April 1933.
