= Mick Twomey =

Australian rules footballer (1931–2015)

Personal information
- Full name: Michael John Twomey
- Born: 25 September 1931
- Died: 14 December 2015 (aged 84)
- Original team: Ballarat (BFL)
- Debut: Round 1, 1951, Collingwood vs. North Melbourne, at Victoria Park
- Height: 185 cm (6 ft 1 in)
- Weight: 87 kg (192 lb)

Playing career^{1}
Years	Club	Games (Goals)
1951–1961	Collingwood	157 (94)
- ^{1} Playing statistics correct to the end of 1961.

Career highlights
- 2× VFL premiership player: 1953, 1958

Michael John Twomey (25 September 1931 – 14 December 2015) was an Australian rules footballer who played for the Collingwood Football Club in the Victorian Football League (VFL).

At 185 centimetres (6 ft 1 in) in height, Collingwood's Mick Twomey was taller than his brothers Bill and Pat. Recruited from Yarra Valley, he played most of his 157 VFL games between 1951 and 1961 as a ruckman. In fact he was short for a ruckman; but he had remarkable spring, and newspapers often carried photos of him seeming to soar over opponents. In the 1958 VFL Grand Final, for instance, the highlights footage from Channel 7 shows him contesting ruck hit-outs and marks with opposing ruckmen who were 11 cm and 13 cm taller.

Over the course of his 10-year career Twomey was a member of five Collingwood Grand Final teams, enjoying premiership success in 1953 and 1958. He died in 2015.
