= 1961 Hawthorn Football Club season =

37th season in the Victorian Football League

Hawthorn Football Club
1961 season
- President: Dr. A.S. Ferguson
- Coach: John Kennedy Sr.
- Captain: Graham Arthur
- Home ground: Glenferrie Oval
- VFL season: 14–4 (1st)
- Finals series: Premiers (Defeated Footscray 94–51)
- Best and fairest: Ian Law
- Leading goalkicker: John Peck (49)
- Highest home attendance: 107,935 (Grand Final vs. Footscray)
- Lowest home attendance: 14,000 (Round 15 vs. North Melbourne)
- Average home attendance: 37,471

The 1961 season was the Hawthorn Football Club's 37th season in the Victorian Football League and 60th overall. The season was a historic one for Hawthorn finishing top of the ladder and claiming the McClelland Trophy for the first time in their history, reaching the Grand Final for the first time in their history, and winning the Premiership for the first time in their history.

== Fixture ==
=== Premiership Season ===
Rd	Date and local time	Opponent	Scores (Hawthorn's scores indicated in bold)			Venue	Attendance	Record
Rd	Date and local time	Opponent	Home	Away	Result	Venue	Attendance	Record
1	Saturday, 15 April (2:20 pm)	South Melbourne	**7.14 (56)**	11.15 (81)	Lost by 25 points	Glenferrie Oval (H)	20,000	0–1
2	Saturday, 22 April (2:20 pm)	Melbourne	5.14 (44)	**11.10 (76)**	Won by 32 points	Melbourne Cricket Ground (A)	34,640	1–1
3	Saturday, 29 April (2:20 pm)	Fitzroy	**13.17 (95)**	10.9 (69)	Won by 26 points	Glenferrie Oval (H)	21,500	2–1
4	Saturday, 6 May (2:20 pm)	North Melbourne	8.7 (55)	**12.13 (85)**	Won by 30 points	Arden Street Oval (A)	13,500	3–1
5	Saturday, 13 May (2:20 pm)	Essendon	**9.21 (75)**	12.4 (76)	Lost by 1 point	Glenferrie Oval (H)	31,000	3–2
6	Saturday, 21 May (2:20 pm)	St Kilda	14.16 (100)	**12.9 (81)**	Lost by 19 points	Junction Oval (A)	32,900	3–3
7	Saturday, 3 June (2:20 pm)	Richmond	**10.13 (73)**	8.12 (60)	Won by 13 points	Glenferrie Oval (H)	15,000	4–3
8	Monday, 12 June (2:20 pm)	Footscray	14.19 (103)	**13.13 (91)**	Lost by 12 points	Western Oval (A)	24,132	4–4
9	Saturday, 17 June (2:20 pm)	Geelong	9.7 (61)	**10.10 (70)**	Won by 9 points	Kardinia Park (A)	14,197	5–4
10	Saturday, 24 June (2:20 pm)	Carlton	**12.6 (78)**	6.10 (46)	Won by 32 points	Glenferrie Oval (H)	21,500	6–4
11	Saturday, 1 July (2:20 pm)	Collingwood	**13.12 (90)**	4.12 (36)	Won by 54 points	Glenferrie Oval (H)	31,500	7–4
12	Saturday, 8 July (2:20 pm)	South Melbourne	7.7 (49)	**9.11 (65)**	Won by 16 points	Lake Oval (A)	13,860	8–4
13	Saturday, 15 July (2:20 pm)	Melbourne	**8.10 (58)**	5.10 (40)	Won by 18 points	Glenferrie Oval (H)	27,500	9–4
14	Saturday, 29 July (2:20 pm)	Fitzroy	12.15 (87)	**13.16 (94)**	Won by 7 points	Brunswick Street Oval (A)	23,012	10–4
15	Saturday, 5 August (2:20 pm)	North Melbourne	**15.10 (100)**	6.11 (47)	Won by 53 points	Glenferrie Oval (H)	14,000	11–4
16	Saturday, 12 August (2:45 pm)	Essendon	10.12 (72)	**11.13 (79)**	Won by 7 points	Windy Hill (A)	27,200	12–4
17	Saturday, 19 August (2:20 pm)	St Kilda	**19.6 (120)**	14.7 (91)	Won by 29 points	Glenferrie Oval (H)	34,500	13–4
18	Saturday, 26 August (2:20 pm)	Richmond	8.8 (56)	**11.15 (81)**	Won by 25 points	Punt Road Oval (A)	15,177	14–4

=== Finals Series ===
Rd	Date and local time	Opponent	Scores (Hawthorn's scores indicated in bold)			Venue	Attendance
Rd	Date and local time	Opponent	Home	Away	Result	Venue	Attendance
Second Semi-Final	Saturday, 9 September (2:30 pm)	Melbourne	**12.8 (80)**	11.7 (73)	Won by 7 points	Melbourne Cricket Ground (H)	87,744
Grand Final	Saturday, 23 September (2:50 pm)	Footscray	**13.16 (94)**	7.9 (51)	Won by 43 points	Melbourne Cricket Ground (H)	107,935

== Ladder ==
(P)	Premiers
	Qualified for finals

#	Team	P	W	L	D	PF	PA	%	Pts
1	Hawthorn (P)	18	14	4	0	1467	1173	125.1	56
2	Melbourne	18	12	5	1	1510	1151	131.2	50
3	St Kilda	18	11	7	0	1373	1173	117.1	44
4	Footscray	18	11	7	0	1334	1216	109.7	44
5	Fitzroy	18	10	7	1	1469	1258	116.8	42
6	Geelong	18	10	7	1	1367	1362	100.4	42
7	Essendon	18	9	8	1	1462	1335	109.5	38
8	Carlton	18	9	9	0	1279	1325	96.5	36
9	Collingwood	18	5	12	1	1166	1375	84.8	22
10	Richmond	18	5	13	0	1126	1428	78.9	20
11	South Melbourne	18	5	13	0	1187	1644	72.2	20
12	North Melbourne	18	4	13	1	1133	1433	79.1	18

Rules for classification: 1. premiership points; 2. percentage; 3. points for
Average score: 73.5
Source: AFL Tables
