= Charlie Stewart (footballer, born 1939) =

Australian rules football player and coach (1939–2024)

Personal information
- Full name: Charles Stewart
- Born: 19 March 1939
- Died: 29 October 2024 (aged 85)
- Original teams: Essendon reserves, Lemnos
- Height: 178 cm (5 ft 10 in)
- Weight: 75 kg (165 lb)
- Position: Wingman

Playing career
Years	Club	Games (Goals)
1961	Footscray	20 (4)

Charles Stewart (19 March 1939 — 29 October 2024) was an Australian rules football player and coach. He is most notable for playing for Footscray in the Victorian Football League. Stewart was of Indigenous Australian descent.

== Playing career ==
Stewart played with the Nathalia Football Club from 1955 to 1957.

He played reserve grade for Essendon in 1957 before a stint with Lemnos.

In April 1961, Stewart was cleared by Essendon to Footscray. He played 20 matches in the 1961 VFL season. He was a reserve player in the Footscray team that lost the 1961 VFL Grand Final. He was released by Footscray in April 1962.

== Coaching career ==
Stewart won the 1963 Goulburn Valley League's best and fairest award, the Morrison Medal and was the playing coach of Victorian country team Kyabram until the end of the 1966 season. For the 1967 season he moved to Stanhope where he continued as a playing coach.

== Death ==
Stewart died on 29 October 2024, at the age of 85.

== Honours ==
On 26 May 2014, the Western Bulldogs designed an Indigenous guernsey that features the names of all 18 indigenous players that have represented the club in senior VFL/AFL competition. It was worn against Fremantle at their home Indigenous round match on 1 June 2014. Stewart was one of the 18 players recognised.

At the conclusion of the 1961 Grand Final, the players from opposing sides swapped jumpers. Stewart traded jumpers with his opposing wingman, Hawthorn's John Fisher. In 2012, Stewart was cleaning out his house and found Fisher's old jumper in a box. He donated the guernsey to the Hawthorn Football Club museum who said it was a "wonderful gesture" and described the jumper as being "in mint condition".
