= Rochow =

Rochow is a surname. Notable people with the surname include:

- Keith Rochow (1934–2014), Australian rules footballer
- Phil Rochow (1937–2013), Australian rules footballer
- Robbie Rochow (born 1990), Australian rugby league footballer
