= Brendan Edwards =

Australian rules footballer (1936–2021)

Personal information
- Full name: Brendan Cornelius Edwards
- Born: 18 March 1936
- Died: 10 May 2021 (aged 85)
- Original team: Sandhurst/Assumption College
- Height: 178 cm (5 ft 10 in)
- Weight: 75 kg (165 lb)

Playing career^{1}
Years	Club	Games (Goals)
1956–1963	Hawthorn	109 (29)
- ^{1} Playing statistics correct to the end of 1963.

Career highlights
- VFL premiership player: 1961; Hawthorn best and fairest: 1960; Hawthorn Hall of Fame

Brendan Cornelius Edwards (18 March 1936 – 10 May 2021) was an Australian rules footballer who played for the Hawthorn Football Club in the Victorian Football League (VFL) from 1956 to 1961 and again in the 1963 season.

== VFL career ==
Edwards was recruited from the Bendigo team of Sandhurst, like his teammate Graham Arthur. He was a physical education schoolteacher when he was selected to make his debut in 1956. Edwards was a fitness fanatic and believed, like his captain, John Kennedy, that footballers were not fit enough. During the 1959 season, Edwards convinced Hawthorn coach Jack Hale to adopt circuit training for the entire team.

Edwards won the Hawthorn best and fairest award in 1960 and represented Victoria at interstate football in the same season. The following year he was voted best on ground in Hawthorn's first premiership win, against Footscray in the 1961 VFL Grand Final. He then took a year off football to concentrate on his gymnasium business. He returned to play in 1963 but lasted only nine games before rupturing his ACL against Richmond. He retired as a player and put his energies into a chain of health clubs in Melbourne and pioneered the concept of aerobic fitness in Australia.

He was awarded life membership of the Hawthorn Football Club in 1970 and named in their team of the century in 2001. In 2011, he was inducted into the Hawthorn Hall of Fame.

== Honours and achievements ==
Hawthorn

- VFL premiership player: 1961
- 2× Minor premiership: 1961, 1963

Individual

- Hawthorn best and fairest: 1960
- Hawthorn Hall of Fame
- Hawthorn life member

== See also ==
- Australian football at the 1956 Summer Olympics
