= 1961 VFL grand final =

Grand final of the 1961 Victorian Football League season

1961 VFL Grand Final

| Hawthorn | Footscray |
|---|---|
| 13.16 (94) | 7.9 (51) |
| | 1 | 2 | 3 | 4 |
|---|---|---|---|---|
| HAW | 2.4 (16) | 3.9 (27) | 9.15 (69) | 13.16 (94) |
| FOO | 4.2 (26) | 5.5 (35) | 6.6 (42) | 7.9 (51) |
- Date: 23 September 1961
- Stadium: Melbourne Cricket Ground
- Attendance: 107,935
- Favourite: Hawthorn

The 1961 VFL Grand Final was an Australian rules football game contested by the Footscray Football Club and Hawthorn Football Club, held at the Melbourne Cricket Ground in Melbourne on 23 September 1961. It was the 64th annual Grand Final of the Victorian Football League, staged to determine the premiers for the 1961 VFL season. The match, attended by 107,935 spectators, was won by Hawthorn by a margin of 43 points, making it the club's first premiership victory.

Hawthorn, which was competing in its first VFL grand final since entering the competition in 1925, went into the game as minor premiers, favourites, and on a club-record 11-game winning streak. Footscray, which also entered the competition in 1925, and was in its second grand final (after winning the 1954 premiership), had finished the home-and-away season in fourth place. They qualified for the grand final after upsetting Ron Barassi-led Melbourne by 27 points in the preliminary final. That ended Melbourne's record sequence of seven consecutive grand final appearance. It was the first grand final not to feature any of the eight foundation VFL clubs.

It was a young Footscray side, with only two players having more than 80 VFL games experience, although one of them was the veteran Ted Whitten. Hawthorn's Brendan Edwards was playing in his 100th VFL game and dominated in the centre. Despite trailing at half time, Hawthorn won comfortably, after kicking six goals to one in a dominant third quarter.

The 1961 grand final is the earliest VFL grand final for which complete television footage has survived, and it has been made available on DVD.

== Teams ==
| Hawthorn | Footscray |

Hawthorn
| B: | 29 Reg Poole | 1 Les Kaine | 10 Graham Cooper |
| HB: | 20 Sted Hay | 28 John McArthur | 26 Cam McPherson |
| C: | 30 Colin Youren | 9 Brendan Edwards | 5 John Fisher |
| HF: | 14 Ian Mort | 31 Garry Young | 4 Morton Browne |
| F: | 11 Malcolm Hill | 23 John Peck | 19 Jack Cunningham |
| Foll: | 12 John Winneke | 2 Graham Arthur (c) | 7 Ian Law |
| Res: | 22 Phil Hay | 3 Ron Nalder | |
| Coach: | John Kennedy Sr. | | |

Footscray
| B: | 28 Charlie Evans | 29 Bernie Lee | 4 Bob Ware |
| HB: | 25 John Jillard | 23 John Hoiles | 38 Barry Ion |
| C: | 12 Alex Gardiner | 8 Bob Spargo | 37 Ian Bryant |
| HF: | 15 John Quarrell | 17 Graham Ion | 30 Barney McKellar |
| F: | 3 Ted Whitten (c) | 24 Jack Slattery | 6 Keith Beamish |
| Foll: | 14 John Schultz | 9 Cameron McDonald | 2 Merv Hobbs |
| Res: | 16 Ken Duff | 5 Charlie Stewart | |
| Coach: | Ted Whitten | | |

Umpire: Frank Schwab

== Scoreboard ==
| Team | 1 | 2 | 3 | Final |
|---|---|---|---|---|
| Hawthorn | 2.4 | 3.9 | 9.15 | 13.16 (94) |
| Footscray | 4.2 | 5.5 | 6.6 | 7.9 (51) |

== Statistics ==
=== Goal kickers ===
Hawthorn:

- Browne 3
- Law 2
- Mort 2
- Arthur 1
- Cunningham 1
- Edwards 1
- Hill 1
- Nalder 1
- Peck 1

Footscray:

- Whitten 3
- Quarrell 2
- Hobbs 1
- McKellar 1

=== Attendance ===
- MCG attendance – 107,935

== See also ==
- 1961 VFL season
