= Matthew Robbins =

Matthew Robbins may refer to:

- Matthew Robbins (footballer) (born 1977), Australian rules footballer
- Matthew Robbins (screenwriter) (born 1945), American screenwriter, producer and director
