= Australian football at the 1956 Summer Olympics =

1956 Summer Olympics demonstration match
VAFA	VFL/VFA
12.9 (81)	8.7 (55)
	1	2	3	4
VAFA	6.1 (37)	9.4 (58)	11.8 (74)	12.9 (81)
VFL/VFA	1.0 (6)	6.0 (36)	6.2 (38)	8.7 (55)
- Date: 7 December 1956, 4:10 pm
- Stadium: MCG
- Attendance: 30,000
- Umpires: Les Wenker

Australian rules football was one of two demonstration sports at the 1956 Summer Olympics held in Melbourne.

The International Olympic Committee (IOC) stipulated that each Summer Olympics host must organise both a "national" game and a sport "foreign" to the organising country as "demonstration sports". Australian football was chosen as the national sport, while baseball was chosen as the foreign sport. In accordance with Olympic eligibility rules, participants were restricted to amateurs, which forced organisers to select squads made up of young stars, ageing veterans and suburban-league athletes.

In front of a crowd of as large as 30,000 spectators, the Victorian Amateur Football Association (VAFA) caused an upset victory by 26 points over a combined team featuring players from both the Victorian Football League (VFL) and Victorian Football Association (VFA). VAFA captain Geoff Hibbins was adjudged by media as the victorious side's best player, while Dick Fenton-Smith and Ray Pettigrove shared leading goal-kicker honours with four goals each.

Many of the participants went on to long and decorated careers in League football, and the match itself was pivotal in guiding how Australian football would be broadcast on television in future years, with a crew commissioned specifically for the Games.

Given the limited popularity of Australian football outside Australia, and the eventual removal of demonstration sports from the Olympic program, the sport has never again featured at any Games since its one-off inclusion in 1956.

== History ==
Melbourne was selected as the host city for the 1956 Summer Olympics (then known as the Games of the XVI Olympiad) on 28 April 1949. Seven months later, the first proposal for Australian football to feature in the Games was suggested by Jack McCann of the Australian Amateur Football Council (AAFC). Despite its popularity still largely confined to the western and southern states of Australia, it was described as the country's "national code", as such warranting the privilege of being shown on the world stage.

By 1952, Australian National Football Council (ANFC) secretary Bruce Andrew was promoting the potential of Australian football at the Games, opting to work closely with the AAFC to ensure the Olympics' amateur status was maintained and that none of the competitors would be playing football for money at the time of the tournament. Andrew acknowledged the challenges of playing the match in December, during the sport's off-season, but reinforced that all discussions had been "only of a preliminary nature" and that details would be fleshed out in the coming months and years.

Nearly two years had passed and the AOC had still yet to decide on what demonstration sports would feature at the Games. An article published in Tasmania's The Advocate in January 1954 suggested that, alongside Australian football, both surf lifesaving and boomerang throwing were being considered by the committee. On 16 July 1954, more than five years following the announcement of Melbourne as host city, Australian football was chosen as the national demonstration sport for the 1956 Summer Olympics. Baseball was chosen as the foreign sport later in the week.

== Format ==
Shortly after the confirmation of Australian football as the "national" sport, officials, journalists, and the public began to muse on what format such an exhibition match would take. While suggestions varied, one constant was that all players must be of an amateur status in keeping with the Olympic spirit and ideals. Thus, this ruled out the top echelon of players in the VFL, which was a semi-professional league and continuing to grow in stature and wealth. The Sporting Globe's Ben Kerville was the first to propose a match-up between the VFL's best remaining amateur players and a "selected All-Australian" team comprising the best amateur footballers from around the country. Burdened by the fact that the League would be unable to showcase its brightest talents to a global audience, the VFL had planned to present an exhibition match between its own professional players that would run concurrently with the Games though not a part of the official program, but this would not eventuate.

Format suggestions were still being put forward as late as 1956; The Argus' sports editor Percy Taylor revealing in January that an "Australia vs. the rest" type match-up was a possibility. However, such a clash would have been unfathomably one-sided, with the popularity of Australian football outside of its home country having waned into insignificance following the conclusion of World War II, which, in turn, saw a large decrease in the number of expat competitions overseas. By March, the would-be format – a VFL/VFA combined amateur team invited to take on a selected side from the VAFA – had been proposed, and in September, was subsequently confirmed. The combined side was created out of necessity, due to an insufficient number of amateurs playing in the VFL at that time. The VFA, a competing semi-professional league also headquartered in Melbourne, was waning in popularity during the 1950s but still regularly featured matches of a high quality. Teams would be "urged to play in a strictly competitive spirit", but also to avoid "negative tactics".

== Squads ==
Extended squads for both sides would train once a week, and from each squad a team of twenty (with three emergencies) would be picked for the exhibition match. Regular Australian football rules still applied to the exhibition match, with eighteen players on the field for each side at any one time, and two 'reserves' able to replace any player (who then cannot return to the field following their substitution).

=== VAFA ===
The VAFA, growing frustrated by the common theme of having its best amateur players 'poached' by the VFL and VFA to play for money, saw the opportunity to upstage its professional counterparts on an elevated public platform. The relationship between the VAFA and the professional leagues was hostile at best, and a win would return a great sense of pride to the amateur association.

The squad selected by the VAFA was star-studded; nearly all of those selected had participated in various association grand finals over the years. The most well-known of the amateur squad, and its captain, was Collegians ruckman Geoff Hibbins. Hibbins had played 33 League games for St Kilda before returning to Collegians, where he won the 1956 Australian Amateur Football Association medal. Murray Mitchell of Old Melburnians was another star selection, having captain-coached his side to premiership success in 1955.

The overall cohesion of the squad was immediately evident, no doubt due to their familiarity with each other, and all of them playing in the same competition, under the same rules; and, although the far more robust style of play of the rather different VFL and VFA competitions was likely to present a far more physical opposition, the bulk of the VAFA squad had also played together at a higher level — in representative amateur interstate matches over the last few seasons.

=== VFL/VFA ===
The VFL/VFA combined squad was headlined by Denis Cordner, who finished runner-up in the club best-and-fairest award in his penultimate season and was praised for his skill and leadership.

The VFL portion of the squad, although making up the majority of the final team, was largely youthful and inexperienced. Only the Richmond pair of Brian Davie and Frank Dunin had more than 30 League games to their name at that point, with eight of the squad members only having made their debut in that year's season. Collingwood had the most squad representatives, with five.

The VFA representatives in the squad contained no Williamstown players, despite the club having won the last three Association premierships. Unlike the VFL squad inclusions, no VFA club boasted more than two players from their side in the overall group of 33. One of the headline players was Box Hill forward Dave Plunkett, who in his first season of Association football had kicked more than 25 goals to help his side to a maiden finals appearance.

Many of the combined squad members were former VAFA players themselves who had maintained an amateur status upon their inclusion in the professional leagues.

==== VFL/VFA training squad ====
VFL/VFA training squad
Club	Player(s)
Collingwood (VFL)	Ray Gabelich, Brian Gray, Bill Serong, Brian Turner, Ken Turner
Footscray (VFL)	John Westacott
Hawthorn (VFL)	Brendan Edwards
Melbourne (VFL)	Dick Atkinson, Brian Collopy, Denis Cordner
North Melbourne (VFL)	Laurie Dwyer, Des Tobin
Richmond (VFL)	Ray Allsopp, Brian Davie, Frank Dunin, Vic Naismith (Note: Was added to the squad following the initial announcement.)
South Melbourne (VFL)	Neil McNeill
St Kilda (VFL)	Bryan King, Brian Muir, Brian Walsh
Box Hill (VFA)	T. Leach, Dave Plunkett
Camberwell (VFA)	Ian Clarke
Coburg (VFA)	Ron Dangaard, Jack Sassella
Moorabbin (VFA)	Norman Burgess
Northcote (VFA)	Thomas Hussey, Keith Woolnough
Oakleigh (VFA)	Keith Anderson, Don Kitto
Prahran (VFA)	Barry Gaze, Lindsay Gaze
Sandringham (VFA)	Keith Marshall, Ross Shrives, Des Quinn

== Lead-up ==
Although VFL/VFA would be assumed favourites, given that its players competed in competitions of a higher standard, news articles suggested a "shock" upset result could equate. The media seemed to side with the amateurs, too. All eyes were on the VAFA's Duncan Anderson, the 24-year-old from Old Melburnians; once described as the "top amateur goal-kicker in Australia". Despite having not played competitive football for two years, Anderson's performances at both team training and in a "special" practice match played on 2 December against the combined VFL/VFA squad (won by the VAFA) led football journalists to believe that he would be one of the keys to the match, and that his influence could be pivotal towards a VAFA victory.

== Selected teams ==
The initial extended training squads were cut to 25 players each in mid-November, from which the final teams of twenty for the VAFA and VFL/VFA combined squad were selected on 2 December and 4 December respectively. The VAFA side was to wear a white guernsey with green trim emblazoned with the Olympic rings, while the VFL/VFA side would wear an inverse design.

=== VAFA ===
Victorian Amateur Football Association
B:	6 Bob Collins (Melbourne High School Old Boys)	19 Laurie Wakeling (Old Paradians)	1 Geoff Hibbins (Collegians) (captain)
HB:	20 Lloyd Williams (Ivanhoe)	5 Tony Capes (University Blacks)	16 Phil Rochow (Coburg Amateurs)
C:	7 Cyril Empey (Commonwealth Bank)	14 Ian Merrick (Coburg Amateurs)	17 Bryce Thomas (Old Melburnians)
HF:	2 Murray Mitchell (Old Melburnians) (vice-captain)	10 Jim Hannan (Old Melburnians)	8 Gerry Gill (University Blacks)
F:	15 Ray Pettigrove (Coburg Amateurs)	3 Duncan Anderson (Old Melburnians)	4 Dick Fenton-Smith (Ormond)
Foll:	11 Peter Harkness (Old Scotch Collegians)	13 John Hayes (University Blues)	12 Mick Keogh (University Blues)
Res:	9 Leigh Grant (Power House)	18 Dick Tindale (Old Scotch Collegians)	
Coach:	Joe Kelly		

==== Emergencies ====
- Peter Craw (Old Scotch Collegians)
- D. Douglas (State Savings Bank)
- John Byrne (Ormond)
- E. J. Hill (Old Paradians)
- S. P. Hawthorne (Old Scotch Collegians)

==== Team manager ====
- Alf Perrin

=== VFL/VFA ===
The combined team was made up of 14 VFL players and 6 VFA players.

Victorian Football League / Victorian Football Association
B:	8 Ray Gabelich (Collingwood)	13 Vic Naismith (Richmond)	19 Brian Walsh (St Kilda)
HB:	18 Jack Sassella (Coburg)	20 John Westacott (Footscray)	4 Brian Collopy (Melbourne)
C:	6 Laurie Dwyer (North Melbourne)	9 Barry Gaze (Prahran)	7 Brendan Edwards (Hawthorn)
HF:	17 Ken Turner (Collingwood)	11 Neil McNeill (South Melbourne)	10 Brian Gray (Collingwood)
F:	5 Frank Dunin (Richmond)	14 Dave Plunkett (Box Hill)	16 Des Tobin (North Melbourne)
Foll:	1 Denis Cordner (Melbourne) (captain)	2 Keith Woolnough (Northcote) (vice-captain)	3 Ray Allsopp (Richmond)
Res:	12 Keith Marshall (Sandringham)	15 Thomas Hussey (Northcote)	
Coach:	Bruce Andrew		

==== Emergencies ====
- Keith Anderson (Oakleigh)
- Lindsay Gaze (Prahran)
- Brian Turner (Collingwood)

==== Team manager ====
- Eric McCutchan

=== Umpires ===
Respected VAFA umpire Les Wenker was chosen to be the field umpire, with Sam Birtles as his reserve. The boundary umpires were the VFL's Bill Quinn (who had officiated in four VFL Grand Finals in his career to date), and the VAFA's Jack Wilson. The goal umpires were Bob Coldrey and Ossie Meehan; both of the VAFA.

== The demonstration match ==
The single demonstration match was played on the Melbourne Cricket Ground, known throughout the Olympics as the "Main Stadium". It started at 4:10 pm on Friday, 7 December 1956, immediately after the bronze medal soccer match between Bulgaria and India had concluded.

=== Condition of the playing area ===
Players had to deal with the various hazards on the ground left over from previous events, chiefly the Olympic flagpole. The 50-foot structure was to be left standing until the conclusion of the closing ceremony as part of Games protocol, despite the fact that it sat awkwardly in the forward pocket, well in from the boundary line. The plinth installed for the inside lane of the running track also posed problems for the footballers, who were at risk of tripping if they did not identify the sharp rise in height of the surface. The size of the playing area itself was reduced dramatically (down to 170 x 145 yards) due to the cinder track around the inside of the stadium, while the sandpits used for the long jump and triple jump events had only recently been covered, making for unsteady ground.

=== The game ===
The VAFA got the jump in the first quarter, kicking six goals to one. After this early dominance, the VAFA never came close to relinquishing their lead, maintaining a healthy margin for the rest of the game. While their opponents fought back in the second term, it was the lapses of the combined team that meant they were never truly in with a chance after going behind early – a goalless third term essentially dashing any hopes of a comeback. Leading the way on the scoreboard for the VAFA were Fenton-Smith and Pettigrove, each with four goals, while the highly favoured Anderson finished with three goals, realising the journalists' predictions. Dunin was the only multiple goalkicker for the combined team, finishing with three. Hibbins, captain, took best afield honours for the VAFA. Contrarily, the Melbourne champion, Cordner, captain of the combined team, had his predicted impact nullified by the "marking ability and persistency" of his opponents.

=== The spectators ===
Crowd estimates varied between 15,000 and 30,000 spectators. Throughout the entire game, at which the Duke of Edinburgh was an interested spectator, a running commentary attempted to explain the umpires' decisions to the audience, and those who were not used to the game found it extremely useful. VAFA secretary and match organiser Jack Fullerton sat alongside the Duke, explaining the intricacies of the game to him throughout.

=== Reception ===
While the official Olympic Report of 1956 praised the quality of the match, describing it as being played "in the true amateur spirit, with an abundance of vigour and speed, plenty of good kicking and high marking", the media was less favourable. (Note: As an example of the less-than-favourable news coverage is the (bizarre-for-Australian rules football) press photograph in the collection of the National Library of Australia () of VAFA's Ray Pettigrove marking in front of VFL/VFA's Brian Walsh, that seems (to the uninitiated) to be showing Pettigrove scoring a rugby union/rugby league "try")

The Argus' Percy Taylor suggested the crowd would not have been greatly impressed by the game, which he said "lacked the fire that makes our game", in part due to it being an out-of-season exhibition match with nothing on the line except pride. Meanwhile, a staff reporter at The Age commented on how the spectators seemed more interested in the butcher hats and coats of the goal umpires than the quirks of the sport itself.

== Scoreboard ==
1956 Summer Olympics Australian football demonstration match
7 December 1956 (4:10 pm)	VAFA	def.	VFL/VFA	MCG (crowd: 30,000 approx.)
6.1 (37); 9.4 (58); 11.8 (74); 12.9 (81)	Q1; Q2; Q3; Final	1.0 (6); 6.0 (36); 6.2 (38); 8.7 (55)	Umpires: Les Wenker
4: Fenton-Smith, Pettigrove; 3: Anderson; 1: Rochow	Goals	3: Dunin; 1: Turner, Woolnough, Plunkett, Tobin, Allsopp
Hibbins, Fenton-Smith, Anderson, Thomas, Pettigrove, Harkness	Best	Edwards, Allsopp, Westacott, Woolnough, Collopy, Sassella, Dunin, Dwyer
Nil	Injuries	Nil
Nil	Reports	Nil

== Aftermath ==
=== VAFA and Olympic Park ===
The VAFA's victory over its higher-standard opponents gave them a bargaining chip when dealing with both the VFL and the VFA in future agreements. The winning twenty were recognised for their achievement with the presentation of a congratulatory letter from Wilfrid Kent Hughes, chairman of the Games organising committee. The following year, the VAFA were granted the use of the Olympic Park No. 2 ground as their headquarters, which proved profitable for the association.

=== VAFA players recruited to VFL ===
Of the winning amateur team, four players would be picked up by VFL clubs in subsequent seasons. Dick Fenton-Smith was selected by Melbourne for the 1957 season, and in his three years in the league, he played in three Grand Finals for a return of two premierships. Most fruitful was his debut league season, when the six-foot-five ruckman booted 18 goals from 18 matches on the way to a premiership. Also making their league debuts in 1957 were Lloyd Williams, who played two games for Collingwood, and Phil Rochow, who played a solitary match for Fitzroy. A year later, John Hayes would make his senior debut for St Kilda, finishing with a tally of seven games.

=== VFL/VFA players' future careers ===
==== VFL footballers ====
The combined team featured a number of VFL players who would go on to achieve greater success in their league careers. The Magpies quartet of Brian Gray, Ken Turner, Ray Gabelich and Bill Serong were all members of Collingwood's 1958 VFL premiership team, with both Gabelich and Serong going on to win club best-and-fairest awards in future seasons (the latter with North Melbourne). North Melbourne had also unearthed a gem in Laurie Dwyer, wingman for the combined team in the demonstration match, as he went on to become a two-time Syd Barker Medallist for North, while also finishing runner-up in the Brownlow Medal in both his best-and-fairest winning seasons. Brendan Edwards followed up a best-and-fairest win for Hawthorn in 1960 with a starring performance in the Hawks' maiden VFL premiership win of 1961.

Coach of the combined team, dual Collingwood premiership player and secretary of the ANFC Bruce Andrew, would be an inaugural inductee into the Australian Football Hall of Fame in 1996, just months before his death.

==== VFA footballers ====
Of the Association representatives, Keith Woolnough, who had experienced a decade-long career with Northcote up to the end of 1956, capped off his career with a surprise victory in the 1958 J. J. Liston Trophy before immediately retiring from the Dragons after 185 senior games. Box Hill's Dave Plunkett was named at centre half-forward in the club's "Greatest Ever Team", announced in 2000, after a career spanning 115 games and 91 goals.

=== TV broadcasting of football ===
Foreshadowing a move to commercialise and promote the sport, Alf Potter and Gordon Bennett of HSV commissioned a 'trial run' of filming the demonstration match for television purposes. While the game wasn't broadcast live on free-to-air TV, remnants of the video remain and can be viewed on the AOC's website. The low-angle action shots and fast jump cuts proved appealing and by the 1957 season, the three television stations at the time – HSV, GTV and ABV – were all broadcasting the final quarter of a live VFL match into viewers' homes each week, the first time that Australian football would be shown on free-to-air television.

== See also ==
- Baseball at the 1956 Summer Olympics
