= Football at the 1956 Summer Olympics =

Football at the 1956 Summer Olympics may refer to:

- Association football at the 1956 Summer Olympics
- Australian football at the 1956 Summer Olympics
