= Duncan Anderson =

Australian rules footballer and cricketer (1931–1996)

Personal information
- Born: James Duncan Anderson; 17 December 1931 Melbourne, Victoria, Australia
- Died: 19 August 1996 (aged 64) Canberra, Australian Capital Territory, Australia
Australian rules football career
Personal information
- Position: Full-forward
Playing career^{1}
Years	Club	Games (Goals)
1950–1953	University	80 (390)
1954	Old Melburnians	16 (75)
Representative team honours
Years	Team	Games (Goals)
1950–1954	Victoria (amateur)	8 (??)
- ^{1} Playing statistics correct to the end of 1954.
Career highlights
- VAFL Section A premiership player: 1952; 4× University leading goalkicker: 1950, 1951, 1952, 1953; Old Melburnians leading goalkicker: 1954

Sport
- Cricket career

Cricket information
- Batting: Right-handed
- Bowling: Right-arm off spin Right-arm medium pace

Domestic team information
- Years: Team
- 1955: Oxford University Cricket Club
- First-class debut: 11 May 1955 Oxford University Cricket Club v Yorkshire
- Last First-class: 14 May 1955 Oxford University Cricket Club v Warwickshire

Career statistics
Competition	FC
Matches	2
Runs scored	4
Batting average	4
100s/50s	0/0
Top score	4*
Balls bowled	216
Wickets	4
Bowling average	29.50
5 wickets in innings	0
10 wickets in match	0
Best bowling	4/68
Catches/stumpings	3/–
- Source: CricketArchive, 12 August 2008

James Duncan Anderson (17 December 1931 – 19 August 1996) was an Australian footballer and first-class cricketer.

== Sporting career ==
Anderson played as a full-forward in the Victorian Amateur Football Association (VAFA) from 1950 to 1954. He played four seasons with the University Blues, followed by a season with the Old Melburnians. He was noted for his prolific goalkicking and was the leading goalkicker in Section A in every season he played in, the only player to have done so. He was the vice-captain of the club during the 1952 season, where the Blues went on win their first Premiership title, defeating Ormond in the Grand Final, with Anderson scoring ten of the twenty goals that Blues put past Ormond. He took on a dual role in the 1953 season, acting as both captain and coach of the club, as the Blues finished as runners-up. Anderson also represented Victoria as an amateur in eight matches, including at the 1951 and 1953 AAFC Carnivals.

In August 1954, Anderson left Australia to study in the United Kingdom, attending Magdalen College, Oxford. In December, he was named Blue of the Game in the annual Australian rules match between Oxford and Cambridge, where he played alongside future Prime Minister Bob Hawke. In May 1955, he played cricket in first-class two matches for Oxford University. His highest score of 4* came against Warwickshire. His best bowling of 4/68 came against Yorkshire.

Despite having not played competitive football for two years, Anderson appeared in a demonstration match at the 1956 Summer Olympics. He was selected to play in a team representing the Victorian Amateur Football Association against a combined team of players from the Victorian Football League (VFL) and the Victorian Football Association (VFA). Although the combined VFL/VFA team were favoured to win the match, some football journalists backed the VAFA team, citing Anderson's performances at both team training and in a "special" practice match as reasons for a potential upset. On 7 December, the VAFA team were victorious, defeating the combined team by 26 points. Anderson finished the match with three goals.

== Death ==
In later life, Anderson moved to Canberra, working for the ANZ bank. He died in August 1996 after a short illness.

== See also ==
- Australian football at the 1956 Summer Olympics
