= Merv Hobbs =

Australian rules footballer and coach

Personal information
- Born: 16 June 1942 (age 84)
- Original team: Daylesford (Ballarat FL)
- Debut: Round 8, 1961, Footscray vs. Hawthorn, at Western Oval
- Height: 175 cm (5 ft 9 in)
- Weight: 67 kg (148 lb)

Playing career^{1}
| Years | Club | Games (Goals) |
| 1961–1965 | Footscray | 74 (115) |
- ^{1} Playing statistics correct to the end of 1965.

Mervyn 'Merv' Hobbs (born 16 June 1942) is a former Australian rules footballer who played with Footscray in the VFL during the early 1960s.

== VFL career ==
Hobbs was recruited from Daylesford and joined Footscray as a rover. Hobbs is best remembered for a spectacular mark which he took in the 1961 Preliminary Final where Footscray upset Melbourne to end their streak of seven successive Grand Final appearances. His team lost the 1961 Grand Final comfortably to Hawthorn but he played in back to back Night Series Premierships in 1963 and 1964.

Hobbs often rested in the forward pocket and was handy near goals. In an era where Footscray lacked big goal-kickers, Hobbs contributed one and a half goals a game. He kicked a career best eight goals in a game against South Melbourne at Western Oval early into his second season. His season tally of 16 goals in 1963 was enough to share Footscray's goal kicking award and his 24 goals in 1965 won it outright.

An injury sustained at training in the 1966 pre-season in which he tore his anterior and interior ligaments as well as cartilage in his right knee, ended his VFL career.

Hobbs was 23 when his VFL career was ended through the serious injury

== Post VFL career ==
In 1966, Hobbs played 4 games for VFA team, Yarraville. This was curtailed with ongoing problems with the injured knee. In 1968, Hobbs Captain-Coached, Seddon, in the Footscray Districts League. In 1971, Hobbs coached Footscray Under 19's to 5th spot on the ladder, then supplying the Footscray Seniors with many young stars. In 1972, Hobbs missed out on the Footscray Seniors coaching job, only being beaten by last minute applicant, who was Bob Rose, the champion Collingwood player and coach. Also Hobbs then was appointed in 1972, Captain-Coach of Melton Football Club, on top of the ladder all year and unbeaten. Melton beat Darley by 10 goals in the second semi-final, only to have a tragic loss that night, of their star player, best and fairest winner, Cahill, who was killed in a car accident. Playing Darley again in the Grand Final, Melton were hot favourites for the win, after being unbeaten all year, a win was on track until player Fanning, push Hobbs into the iron fence and broke his jaw. His brother, Bonga, who was on the bench, right where the incident happened, jumped up and knocked out 6'6 Fanning. With the loss of Cahill, and the severe injury to Hobbs, their playing coach, Melton played the man and not the ball and ultimately lost the Grand Final. In 1973, Hobbs played for Brunswick in a losing Grand Final. In 1974, Hobbs Captain-Coached Unbeaten Newport to the Flag. In 1976, Hobbs was chairman of selectors for Footscray Football Club.

In 1977, Hobbs and his brother Dave, kicked 10 goals between them for Longwood in the Benalla & District Football League Grand Final to win by 8 goals over hot favourites, Benalla All Blacks in a violent Grand Final, giving Longwood their first premiership in 24 years. The following year, 1978, Hobbs and his brother were assistant coaches at West Newport to Charlie Menzies, the coach, who Merv had coached at Footscray Under 19's in 1971. On a very windy day for the second semi final, West Newport were beaten by Brooklyn by 2 points, but responded in the Grand Final, by winning at a margin of 39 points, Hobbs and his brother kicked 6 goals between them giving West Newport their first premiership in 9 years. In 1979 & 1980, Hobbs coached Williamstown in the VFA Second Division, playing in the finals in both years, supplying a 15 year old, Ian Fairley to North Melbourne in the VFL. Hobbs went on to being President of Williamstown Football Club for many years.

== Links ==
- 1961 - Preliminary Final mark photo by Merv Hobbs
