= Serong =

Serong is a surname. Notable people with the name include:

- Bill Serong (1936–2024), Australian rules footballer
- Caleb Serong (born 2001), Australian rules footballer
- Jai Serong (born 2003), Australian rules footballer
- Jock Serong, Australian novelist
- Ted Serong (1915–2002), Australian Army officer

== See also ==
- Sarong, Indonesian garment
- Titi Serong, a state constituency in Malaysia
