= Colin Youren =

Australian rules footballer

Personal information
- Born: 3 June 1939
- Died: 20 July 2015 (aged 76)
- Original team: Scotch College
- Height: 180 cm (5 ft 11 in)
- Weight: 76 kg (168 lb)

Playing career^{1}
Years	Club	Games (Goals)
1958–1965	Hawthorn	135 (34)
- ^{1} Playing statistics correct to the end of 1965.

Career highlights
- VFL premiership player: 1961

Colin George Youren (3 June 1939 – 20 July 2015) was an Australian rules footballer who played for Hawthorn in the Victorian Football League (VFL). His father George Youren played for Collingwood in 1919.

A wingman, Youren was a member of Hawthorn's inaugural premiership side in 1961 and represented Victoria at interstate football. He died in 2015 from cancer.

== Honours and achievements ==
Hawthorn

- VFL premiership player: 1961
- 2× Minor premiership: 1961, 1963

Individual

- Hawthorn life member
