= Barney McKellar =

Australian rules footballer

Personal information
- Full name: Cecil Barry McKellar
- Born: 1 February 1940
- Died: 16 October 1994 (aged 54)
- Original team: Lemnos
- Height: 178 cm (5 ft 10 in)
- Weight: 78 kg (172 lb)

Playing career^{1}
Years	Club	Games (Goals)
1960–1962	Footscray	22 (11)
- ^{1} Playing statistics correct to the end of 1962.

Cecil Barry "Barney" McKellar (1 February 1940 – 16 October 1994) was an Australian rules footballer who played with Footscray in the Victorian Football League (VFL).

A half forward from Lemnos, McKellar played 19 of his 22 league games in the 1961 VFL season. This included the 1961 Grand Final loss to Hawthorn. He later injured his knee and had to have a cartilage operation, after which he was dropped of Footscray's training list.

McKellar coached Coolamon Football Club in the South West Football League (New South Wales) in 1968.
