= Bibbins =

Bibbins is a surname. Notable people with the surname include:

- Justin Bibbins (born 1996), American basketball player
- Kirsten Bibbins-Domingo, American epidemiologist and physician
- Mark Bibbins (born 1968), American poet

== See also ==
- Hibbins
