= John Hayes (footballer, born 1936) =

Australian rules footballer

Personal information
- Full name: John Hayes
- Born: 27 February 1936 (age 90)
- Original team: University Blues
- Height: 188 cm (6 ft 2 in)
- Weight: 89 kg (196 lb)

Playing career^{1}
Years	Club	Games (Goals)
1958	St Kilda	7 (0)
- ^{1} Playing statistics correct to the end of 1958.

John Hayes (born 27 February 1936) is a former Australian rules footballer who played with St Kilda in the Victorian Football League (VFL).

== See also ==
- Australian football at the 1956 Summer Olympics
