= Brian Davie =

Australian rules footballer

Personal information
- Full name: Brian Davie
- Born: 31 August 1934
- Original team: University
- Height: 183 cm (6 ft 0 in)
- Weight: 84 kg (185 lb)
- Position: Defence

Playing career^{1}
Years	Club	Games (Goals)
1953–59	Richmond	89 (36)
- ^{1} Playing statistics correct to the end of 1959.

Brian Davie (born 31 August 1934) is a former Australian rules footballer who played with Richmond in the Victorian Football League (VFL).

== See also ==
- Australian football at the 1956 Summer Olympics
