= Bob Ware =

Australian rules footballer

Personal information
- Full name: Robert Ware
- Born: 23 August 1941 (age 85)
- Original team: Footscray Thirds
- Height: 189 cm (6 ft 2 in)
- Weight: 89 kg (196 lb)
- Position: Ruckman

Playing career^{1}
Years	Club	Games (Goals)
1959–1963	Footscray	65 (40)
1964-1968	Williamstown	43 (67)
Total		108 (107)
- ^{1} Playing statistics correct to the end of 1963.

Bob Ware (born 23 August 1941) is a former Australian rules footballer who played for Footscray in the Victorian Football League (VFL).

Ware, the nephew of club great Norman, started his VFL career as a half forward and kicked 19 goals in his debut season. He then developed into Footscray's back up ruckman and played in the 1961 VFL Grand Final loss to Hawthorn. Ware was still occasionally pushed forward and kicked a bag of five goals against Geelong in 1963.

A VFA representative at the 1966 Hobart Carnival, Ware played at Williamstown once he left Footscray.
