= Lloyd Williams (footballer) =

Australian rules footballer (born 1934)

Personal information
- Full name: Lloyd Williams
- Born: 8 October 1934 (age 92)
- Original team: Ivanhoe Amateurs
- Height: 182 cm (6 ft 0 in)
- Weight: 72 kg (159 lb)

Playing career^{1}
Years	Club	Games (Goals)
1957	Collingwood	2 (0)
- ^{1} Playing statistics correct to the end of 1957.

Lloyd Williams (born 8 October 1934) is a former Australian rules footballer who played with Collingwood in the Victorian Football League (VFL).

== See also ==
- Australian football at the 1956 Summer Olympics
