= Cameron McDonald =

Australian rules footballer

Personal information
- Full name: Cameron McDonald
- Born: 24 June 1940
- Died: 13 February 2014 (aged 73)
- Height: 183 cm (6 ft 0 in)
- Weight: 83 kg (183 lb)

Playing career^{1}
Years	Club	Games (Goals)
1959–1963	Footscray	42 (23)
- ^{1} Playing statistics correct to the end of 1963.

Cameron "Cam" McDonald (22 June 1940 – 13 February 2014) was an Australian rules footballer who played with Footscray in the Victorian Football League (VFL).

McDonald was a follower for Footscray in the 1961 VFL Grand Final, which they lost to Hawthorn. He had earlier in the year sought a clearance to Collingwood, but it was refused.
