= Brian Walsh (footballer, born 1934) =

Australian rules footballer

Personal information
- Full name: Brian James Walsh
- Born: 25 October 1934
- Died: 19 August 2010 (aged 75)
- Original team: Ormond Amateur
- Height: 178 cm (5 ft 10 in)
- Weight: 73 kg (161 lb)

Playing career^{1}
| Years | Club | Games (Goals) |
| 1956–1964 | St Kilda | 131 (0) |
- ^{1} Playing statistics correct to the end of 1964.

Brian James Walsh (25 October 1934 – 19 August 2010) was an Australian rules footballer who played with St Kilda in the Victorian Football League (VFL).

Walsh started his career as a centreman, with Ormond Amateurs, in the Victorian Amateur Football Association. He was recruited to the VFL by St Kilda coach Alan Killigrew, who had coached Walsh when he was a junior with CBC St Kilda.

At St Kilda he played in the back pocket, forming a strong defence, which had two Brownlow Medal winners, Neil Roberts and Verdun Howell. Roberts has been quoted saying Walsh was the best player in the back six.

His 131 league games, between 1956 and 1964, included two finals.

Walsh didn't kick a goal for St Kilda, although he did manage a goal for an opposition team. The goal came when St Kilda were playing Carlton at Junction Oval, in the fourth round of the 1958 season. Due to the pressure from Carlton players, Walsh rushed a kick, which went through the opposition's goal posts. Normally this would be a behind, but the field umpire Bill Barbour gave the all-clear for the goal umpire to signal a goal, despite not having had clear vision of the kick. In newspaper scorecards, Walsh was listed as one of Carlton's goal-kickers, but records now give the goal to Carlton rover Doug Beasy.

He played for the Cobram Football Club after leaving St Kilda.

== See also ==
- Australian football at the 1956 Summer Olympics
