= Vic Naismith =

Australian rules footballer (1936–2021)

Personal information
- Full name: Victor Henry Naismith
- Born: 1 May 1936
- Died: 26 October 2021 (aged 85); Moe, Victoria
- Original team: Essex Heights
- Height: 188 cm (6 ft 2 in)
- Weight: 92 kg (203 lb)

Playing career^{1}
Years	Club	Games (Goals)
1956–58	Richmond	31 (7)
- ^{1} Playing statistics correct to the end of 1958.

Victor Henry Naismith (1 May 1936 – 26 October 2021) was an Australian rules footballer who played with Richmond in the Victorian Football League (VFL).

A talented sportsman at tennis, squash, golf and throwing events, Naismith was in contention to compete in the javelin at the 1956 Melbourne Olympics, but injured his shoulder at work. He did however represent the VFL/VFA team in the Australian football exhibition match at the Games.
