= Neil McNeill (footballer) =

Australian rules footballer (1932–2026)

Personal information
- Full name: Neil McNeill
- Born: 27 February 1932
- Died: 29 June 2026 (aged 94)
- Original team: State Savings Bank Amateurs
- Height: 188 cm (6 ft 2 in)
- Weight: 91 kg (201 lb)

Playing career
Years	Club	Games (Goals)
1955–1956	South Melbourne	11 (1)

Neil McNeill (27 February 1932 – 29 June 2026) was an Australian rules footballer who played with South Melbourne in the Victorian Football League (VFL).

Later captain and coached Boronia, East Burwood, Gembrook and Yackandandah.

He died on 29 June 2026, at the age of 94.

== See also ==
- Australian football at the 1956 Summer Olympics
