= George Youren =

Australian rules footballer

Personal information
- Full name: George Oliver Youren
- Born: 19 November 1891; Clifton Hill, Victoria
- Died: 7 April 1967 (aged 75); Burwood, Victoria
- Original team: Northcote

Playing career^{1}
| Years | Club | Games (Goals) |
| 1912,1915 | Northcote (VFA) | 2 (0) |
| 1919 | Collingwood | 3 (1) |
- ^{1} Playing statistics correct to the end of 1919.

George Oliver Youren (19 November 1891 – 7 April 1967) was an Australian rules footballer who played with Collingwood in the Victorian Football League (VFL). His son Colin Youren played for Hawthorn from the 1950s.
