= Brian Muir (footballer) =

Australian rules footballer (1936–2020)

Personal information
- Full name: Brian Albert Muir
- Born: 11 July 1936
- Died: 11 May 2020 (aged 83)
- Height: 185 cm (6 ft 1 in)
- Weight: 83 kg (183 lb)

Playing career^{1}
Years	Club	Games (Goals)
1956–59	St Kilda	42 (14)
- ^{1} Playing statistics correct to the end of 1959.

Brian Albert Muir (11 July 1936 – 11 May 2020) was an Australian rules footballer who played with St Kilda in the Victorian Football League (VFL).

As a player, committeeman, under-19s coach, selector, and President of the Past Players group, he was deeply involved with a wide range of club activities.

The former Malvern Grammar boy began his involvement with the Saints as a 17 year old in the 1954, season. He would play for our under-19s on a Saturday, and front up again the next day for Balaclava in the Sunday competition.

In later years Brian would muse about how fit he and his mates must have been to play back-to back games every weekend. His first coach in the thirds at St Kilda was Hughie Thomas, by then in his 60s and a famed figure who had been Jock McHale's assistant at Collingwood during a particularly high point in the Magpies' career before coaching St Kilda's reserves and seniors in the 1940s. In 1955 Brian was Best and Fairest for the Under-19s, and was runner-up in the competition best and fairest – the Morrish Medal. He lost by just two votes.

Brian made his senior debut in 1956, an atmosphere of wholesale huge change at the club under new coach Alan Killigrew. Brian would later write: "He started recruiting young blokes and getting rid of a few he didn’t think were up to it. He created a magnificent feel about the place and you wanted to train because you could see there was something there for the future."

He had 15 senior games in that first year and ended with 42 to his name. His greatest asset was his superb high marking, but he was the first to admit that his awkward kicking style did not always produce the best results. He did not play a senior game in 1960 and his good friend and teammate Allan Jeans took over as reserves coach for the latter part of the season. A picture of the reserves team taken before the final round at Fitzroy shows the two men seated next to each other, and it is likely that Brian was skipper of the twos that day in what proved to be his last game in the Saints colours. For Jeans there was a new appointment in the offing and he took over the senior coaching role a few weeks later.

Jeans always put the club first and Brian recalled their conversation after a training session.

"Jeansy said one night he wanted to drive me home. I knew what was going to happen. He said I think you should go make a quid from a coaching job. I said that’s fine. He was good about it-he was a mate of mine."

That mateship extended across decades and the pair enjoyed many great times together on the rinks at Cheltenham Bowls Club. Muir captain-coached East Brighton for two years in which the Vampires made the preliminary final both times. More importantly from a Saints perspective he nurtured kids like Carl Ditterich, Jeff Moran, Dennis Bartley and Jim Read and gave them their entry to senior suburban footy. Read and Moran were wingers in the 1966 premiership, and Ditterich famously missed that game through suspension. An East Brighton team picture from 1962, includes the young Ditterich and Bartley in Muir's team.

His time at East Brighton came to an end because of his increasing workload as a wool classer. He would eventually become manager of Dalgety's Melbourne enterprise and was widely respected across north-east Victoria and Gippsland. In 1963 he returned to the Saints when elected to the committee and a few years later when a vacancy came up as Saint' under-19 coach, fellow committeeman Brian Gleeson pointed at him and said "we have a ready-made coach sitting over there!" Along the way Brian had also been a senior selector for the club.

Muir coached the club's Under-19s for seven years, during which players including Russell Greene, Grant Thomas, Bill Mildenhall, and Colin Carter went on to senior careers. He also contributed to the creation of the club's Junior Development programme.

He had already made a telling contribution to the club across a wide spectrum, but he then entered upon another phase with the past players group.

Working with Brian Milnes he resurrected this vital part of the club and subsequently became president of the past players for 14 years.

"Moo" as he was universally known, summed up his time with the Saints succinctly in his contribution to the Saints' 1966 Icon Archive: "I have loved every minute of it."

== See also ==
- Australian football at the 1956 Summer Olympics
