= John Westacott =

Australian rules footballer

Personal information
- Full name: John Westacott
- Born: 9 August 1933
- Original team: Collegians
- Height: 188 cm (6 ft 2 in)
- Weight: 90 kg (198 lb)

Playing career^{1}
Years	Club	Games (Goals)
1955–57, 1959	Footscray	34 (0)
- ^{1} Playing statistics correct to the end of 1959.

John Westacott (born 9 August 1933) is a former Australian rules footballer who played with Footscray in the Victorian Football League (VFL).

== See also ==
- Australian football at the 1956 Summer Olympics
