= Reg Poole (footballer) =

Australian rules footballer (1942–2021)

Personal information
- Full name: Reginald Thomas Poole
- Born: 15 January 1942
- Died: 23 March 2021 (aged 79)
- Original team: Kew YCW
- Height: 178 cm (5 ft 10 in)
- Weight: 76 kg (168 lb)

Playing career^{1}
Years	Club	Games (Goals)
1961–1968	Hawthorn	62 (0)
- ^{1} Playing statistics correct to the end of 1968.

Career highlights
- VFL premiership player: 1961

Reginald Thomas Poole (15 January 1942 – 23 March 2021) was an Australian rules footballer who played for Hawthorn in the VFL during the 1960s.

Poole played in the back pocket for Hawthorn and was a premiership player in his debut season with the club. He retired young in 1968, at just 26 years of age.

His daughter, Katie Hudson, a businesswoman, is a member of the Hawthorn board of directors.
