= Brian Turner (footballer, born 1933) =

Australian rules footballer (1933–2024)

Personal information
- Full name: Brian Joseph Turner
- Born: 19 December 1933
- Died: 21 December 2024 (aged 91)
- Original team: Old Paradians
- Height: 189 cm (6 ft 2 in)
- Weight: 76 kg (168 lb)

Playing career^{1}
Years	Club	Games (Goals)
1952, 1954–57	Collingwood	38 (11)
1959–61	North Melbourne	43 (0)
Total		81 (11)
- ^{1} Playing statistics correct to the end of 1961.

Brian Joseph Turner (19 December 1933 – 21 December 2024) was an Australian rules footballer who played with Collingwood and North Melbourne in the Victorian Football League (VFL). Turner was part of the VFL/VFA combined team that played the Australian football demonstration game against the VAFA side during the 1956 Summer Olympics in Melbourne, but was an unused substitute. Turner died on 21 December 2024, two days after his 91st birthday.

== See also ==
- Australian football at the 1956 Summer Olympics
