= Charlie Evans (Australian footballer) =

Australian rules footballer (1942–2021)

Personal information
- Full name: Charles Edward Francis Evans
- Born: 7 January 1942
- Died: 16 September 2021 (aged 79)
- Original team: Footscray District
- Height: 175 cm (5 ft 9 in)
- Weight: 78 kg (172 lb)

Playing career^{1}
Years	Club	Games (Goals)
1960–1963	Footscray	42 (0)
1964	South Melbourne	8 (0)
Total		50 (0)
- ^{1} Playing statistics correct to the end of 1964.

Charles Edward Francis Evans (7 January 1942 – 16 September 2021) was an Australian rules footballer who played with Footscray and South Melbourne in the Victorian Football League (VFL).

Evans, who was recruited locally, finished equal fifth in the 1961 Brownlow Medal count, with 12 votes.

He played as a back pocket in the 1961 VFL Grand Final, which Footscray lost to Hawthorn.

In 1962 he represented the VFL for the first time.
