= Ian Law =

Australian rules footballer and cricketer

Personal information
- Full name: Ian Kennon Law
- Born: 27 September 1938 (age 88); Richmond, Victoria
- Original team: Old Scotch Amateurs

Playing career^{1}
Years	Club	Games (Goals)
1960–1968	Hawthorn	106 (115)
- ^{1} Playing statistics correct to the end of 1968.

Career highlights
- VFL premiership player: 1961; 3× Hawthorn best and fairest: 1961, 1963, 1964; Hawthorn Hall of Fame

Ian Law
Cricket information
- Batting: Left-handed

Domestic team information
- Years: Team
- 1961/62–1963/64: Victoria

Career statistics
Competition	First-class
Matches	4
Runs scored	138
Batting average	23.00
100s/50s	0/1
Top score	93
Catches/stumpings	2/–
- Source: CricInfo, 6 March 2014

Ian Law (born 27 September 1938) is a former Australian rules footballer who played for the Hawthorn Football Club in the Victorian Football League (VFL).

A rover, Law won the Hawthorn Best and fairest award in just his second year of VFL football and also finished third in the 1961 Brownlow Medal count. He played in Hawthorn's 1961 premiership team and was Club Champion twice more before retiring after the 1968 season.

In the early 1960s, he played four first-class cricket matches for Victoria as a specialist batsman.

== Honours and achievements ==
Hawthorn

- VFL premiership player: 1961
- 2× Minor premiership: 1961, 1963

Individual

- 3× Hawthorn best and fairest: 1961, 1963, 1964
- Hawthorn Hall of Fame
- Hawthorn life member
