= Hibbins =

Hibbins is a surname. Notable people with the surname include:

- Ann Hibbins (died 1656), American woman executed for witchcraft
- Frederick Hibbins (1890–1969), British long-distance runner
- Geoff Hibbins (1929–2018), Australian rules footballer
- Sam Hibbins (born 1982), Australian politician
