= Dick Fenton-Smith =

Australian rules footballer (1931–2021)

Personal information
- Full name: Richard Edward Fenton-Smith
- Born: 19 October 1931
- Died: 11 April 2021 (aged 89)
- Original team: Ormond Amateurs (VAFA)
- Height: 196 cm (6 ft 5 in)
- Weight: 85 kg (187 lb)
- Position: Ruckman

Playing career^{1}
Years	Club	Games (Goals)
1957–1959	Melbourne	50 (21)
- ^{1} Playing statistics correct to the end of 1959.

Richard Edward Fenton-Smith (19 October 1931 – 11 April 2021) was an Australian rules footballer who played for Melbourne in the Victorian Football League (VFL) during the late 1950s.

Prior to starting with Melbourne Fenton-Smith played with the 1954 QANFL premiership Western Districts team.

Recruited from Ormond Amateur Football Club, Fenton-Smith played in many positions in his brief career including the ruck and defence. He kicked 18 of his 21 goals in his debut season and played in two Melbourne premiership teams. In 1960 he moved to Adelaide and played with Sturt in the South Australian National Football League.

== See also ==
- Australian football at the 1956 Summer Olympics
