= Des Tobin =

Australian rules footballer

Personal information
- Full name: Des Tobin
- Born: 19 November 1938 (age 87)
- Original team: Malvern YCW
- Height: 163 cm (5 ft 4 in)
- Weight: 67 kg (148 lb)

Playing career^{1}
| Years | Club | Games (Goals) |
| 1956 | North Melbourne | 1 (0) |
- ^{1} Playing statistics correct to the end of 1956.

Des Tobin (born 19 November 1938) is a former Australian rules footballer who played with North Melbourne in the Victorian Football League (VFL).

== See also ==
- Australian football at the 1956 Summer Olympics
