= Brian Gray =

Australian rules footballer (born 1937)

Personal information
- Born: 21 February 1937 (age 89)
- Original team: Coleraine
- Height: 175 cm (5 ft 9 in)
- Weight: 76 kg (168 lb)

Playing career^{1}
Years	Club	Games (Goals)
1956–1965	Collingwood	111 (45)
- ^{1} Playing statistics correct to the end of 1965.

Brian Gray (born 21 February 1937) is a former Australian rules footballer who played for Collingwood in the Victorian Football League (VFL) during the late 1950s and early 1960s.

Gray usually played as a wingman but could also rove and play at half forward. He was a member of Collingwood's 1958 premiership team and played in a losing Grand Final in 1960. In the 1962 Brownlow Medal count he polled well with an equal sixth-place finish and represented the Victorian interstate side in both 1961 and 1962.

== See also ==
- Australian football at the 1956 Summer Olympics
