= Ray Allsopp =

Australian rules footballer (1933–2021)

Personal information
- Full name: Raymond Arthur Allsopp
- Born: 20 December 1933
- Died: 20 October 2021 (aged 87)
- Original team: University Blacks
- Height: 166 cm (5 ft 5 in)
- Weight: 71 kg (157 lb)
- Position: Rover

Playing career^{1}
Years	Club	Games (Goals)
1955–1959	Richmond	54 (69)

Representative team honours^{2}
Years	Team	Games (Goals)
1957	Victoria	1 (?)
- ^{1} Playing statistics correct to the end of 1959.^{2} Representative statistics correct as of 1957.

Raymond Arthur Allsopp OAM (20 December 1933 – 20 October 2021) was an Australian rules football player who played for the Richmond Football Club in the Victorian Football League (VFL) from 1955 to 1959. Allsopp played as a rover and was known for reading the ball well off packs. Allsopp represented Victoria in 1957. The 1957 season was Allsopp's best in his VFL career—he kicked a career-high 35 goals and polled six Brownlow Medal votes. He finished his career having played 54 games and having kicked 69 goals.

He went on to become the first full-time administrator in the VFL and was charged with developing Vickick, a junior football program, now known as Auskick. The Victorian Australian Football Coaches Association (AFCA) annually recognises his contribution to junior football through the Ray Allsopp Auskick Coach of the Year award.

He was given an AFL Life Membership for administration in 2010 and the Medal of the Order of Australia in 2017 for his service to sport.

== See also ==
- Australian football at the 1956 Summer Olympics
