= Bill Hay (footballer) =

Australian rules footballer

Personal information
- Full name: William Robert Hay
- Born: 27 June 1934
- Died: 29 April 2018 (aged 83)
- Original team: Commonwealth Bank
- Height: 180 cm (5 ft 11 in)
- Weight: 80 kg (176 lb)

Playing career^{1}
| Years | Club | Games (Goals) |
| 1958 | Hawthorn | 4 (0) |
- ^{1} Playing statistics correct to the end of 1958.

William Robert Hay (27 June 1934 – 29 April 2018) was an Australian rules footballer who played with Hawthorn in the Victorian Football League (VFL).

He was the older brother of fellow Hawthorn players Phil Hay and Sted Hay.
