= Bryan King (Australian footballer) =

Australian rules footballer (born 1935)

Personal information
- Full name: Bryan King
- Born: 27 July 1935 (age 91)
- Original team: Camperdown
- Height: 174 cm (5 ft 9 in)
- Weight: 76 kg (168 lb)

Playing career^{1}
Years	Club	Games (Goals)
1956	St Kilda	6 (0)
- ^{1} Playing statistics correct to the end of 1956.

Bryan King (born 27 July 1935) is a former Australian rules footballer who played with St Kilda in the Victorian Football League (VFL).

== See also ==
- Australian football at the 1956 Summer Olympics
