= Ken Duff =

Australian rules footballer

Personal information
- Full name: Ken Duff
- Born: 31 December 1941
- Original team: Parkside
- Height: 185 cm (6 ft 1 in)
- Weight: 76 kg (168 lb)

Playing career^{1}
| Years | Club | Games (Goals) |
| 1961–1965 | Footscray | 67 (15) |
- ^{1} Playing statistics correct to the end of 1965.

Ken Duff (born 31 December 1941) is a former Australian rules footballer who played with Footscray in the Victorian Football League (VFL).

== Biography ==
Duff, who started out as a forward, came into the Footscray side in round seven of the 1961 season and played every game for the rest of the year. He was 19th man for Footscray in the 1961 VFL Grand Final. Although he finished in the losing team that day, he did participate in Footscray's 1963 and 1964 night premierships.

In subsequent years he played as a defender or ruck-rover and after a couple of interrupted seasons appeared in 17 of a possible 18 games in 1964. He was again a regular selection in 1965 but in the 1966 pre-season was cut from Footscray's list.

His grandson, Sam Fisher, was drafted by Sydney in 2016, and later won the Sandover Medal in the West Australian Football League in 2020.
