= Peter Schofield (Australian rules footballer) =

Australian rules footballer (1932–2026)

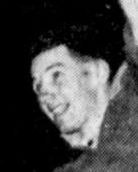
- Schofield in 1953

Personal information
- Full name: Peter John Schofield
- Born: 12 February 1932
- Died: 13 January 2026 (aged 93)
- Original team: Mentone Grammar
- Height: 183 cm (6 ft 0 in)
- Weight: 75 kg (165 lb)
- Position: Full-forward

Playing career
Years	Club	Games (Goals)
1951–1953	Richmond	16 (25)
1953	Melbourne	6 (14)
1954–1957, 1961	Moorabbin (VFA)	75 (312)
1957–1960	North Melbourne	50 (111)

Peter John Schofield (12 February 1932 – 13 January 2026) was an Australian rules footballer who played for Richmond, Melbourne, and North Melbourne in the Victorian Football League (VFL) during the 1950s.

== Biography ==
Mentone's Peter Schofield arrived on the VFL scene when he kicked four goals on debut for Richmond and finished the season with 21 goals from just six appearances. He did not, however, get many opportunities in the seniors over the next two years, nor did he at Melbourne when he crossed there in 1953, in exchange of Frank Dunin, who was residentially tied to Melbourne.

In 1954, Schofield crossed to Moorabbin in the Victorian Football Association (VFA). He was the VFA's leading goalkicker in 1954, when he kicked 96 goals for the year, including a tally of 22 goals in a match against Sandringham. Schofield played in this stint for Moorabbin for just over three seasons, and was cleared to North Melbourne after Round 2, 1957.

At North Melbourne, Schofield was used as a full-forward and played in a losing preliminary final in 1958. He topped their goal-kicking in 1959 with 47 goals and the following season he kicked a VFL career-high eight goals in a match against South Melbourne at Arden Street.

In June 1961, Schofield was cleared back to Moorabbin for a second stint, where he and young star forward Max Papley formed a strong forward-line combination. He played a total of 75 games for Moorabbin, and kicked 312 goals.

Schofield died on 13 January 2026, at the age of 93.
