= Barry Beecroft =

Australian rules footballer

Personal information
- Full name: Barry Beecroft
- Born: 4 January 1955 (age 71)
- Original team: Ormond (VAFA)
- Height: 191 cm (6 ft 3 in)
- Weight: 88 kg (194 lb)

Playing career^{1}
Years	Club	Games (Goals)
1973–77, 1982	South Melbourne	71 (10)
1977–78	Port Melbourne	36
1979–81, 1983–85	Claremont	113 (50)
- ^{1} Playing statistics correct to the end of 1985.

Barry Beecroft (born 4 January 1955) is a former Australian rules footballer who played with South Melbourne/Sydney in the Victorian Football League (VFL).

Beecroft played in a variety of positions during his career but he was primarily a ruckman and key defender. Recruited from Ormond, he was initially a regular fixture in the South Melbourne team of the mid 1970s but put together just eight games in 1976. The following season, after two games, Beecroft left for Port Melbourne and played in a winning Grand Final against Sandringham.

He joined WAFL club Claremont in 1979 and in 1981 was a member of their premiership side, although he missed most of the Grand Final after being knocked down by South Fremantle's Basil Campbell. He moved to Sydney in 1982 to play another season with South Melbourne, who had relocated, but finished his career at Claremont.
