= Auskick =

Australian rules football program for children

Presence
- Country or region: Australia (country of origin); Also played in Fiji, Hong Kong, New Zealand, Papua New Guinea, South Africa, the United Kingdom, the United States and Vanuatu
- Olympic: No
- Paralympic: No

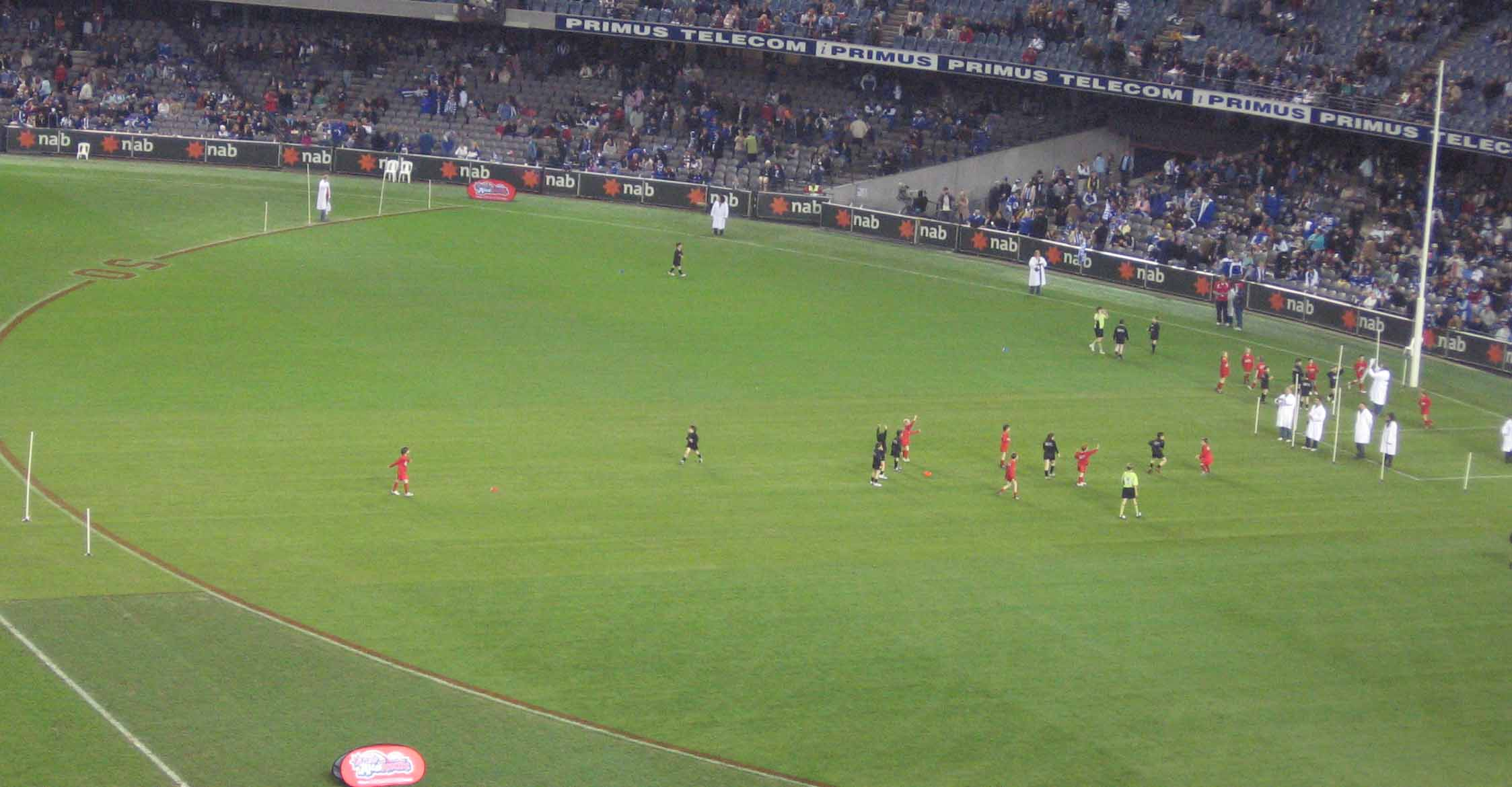
AusKick taking place during the half time break of an AFL game at Marvel Stadium.

Auskick is a program designed to teach the basic skills of Australian football to children aged between 5 and 12. Auskick is a non-contact variant of the sport. It began in Australia and is now a nationwide non-selective program. It has increased participation and diversity in the sport amongst children, and is now being run in many countries across the world.

At its peak in the mid-1990s in Australia there were around 200,000 Auskick participants annually, and this figure has since stabilised around this number. Numerous professional, semi-professional and representative players are graduates.

== History ==
Auskick has its roots in the Little League which began to be played at half time during VFL (now AFL) matches in the 1960s, and it was revised in 1980 to make it more accessible. Little League was expanded by Ray Allsopp into a state development program called "Vickick", begun in Victoria in 1985. Participation increased from 7,000 to 35,000 in four years.

The ACT was one of the first other states or territories to introduce the program in 1991 as "Auskick". Between 1993 and 1995, former AFL player and coach David Parkin, who had been coaching the territory's Teal Cup side, successfully lobbied the AFL for the national adoption of Auskick.

In 1998, the AFL Commission, the national governing body for the sport, began to roll it out nationally. At its peak, there were around 200,000 Auskick participants annually.

In 2007, the program's slogan was "Where Champions Begin", with Jo Silvagni (wife of former AFL player Stephen Silvagni) and Robert DiPierdomenico, the 1986 co-Brownlow Medallist as the main ambassadors.

== Auskick in non-traditional Australian rules football regions ==
The AFL has used the Auskick program the introduce Australian rules football into schools and communities around the country to increase the AFL's profile in areas that traditionally support other football codes such as New South Wales and Queensland. There have been accusations of exaggerated participation figures in an attempts to gain access to Sydney playing fields. Vast increases in AFL participation figures in Sydney were questioned by David Lawson, a Melbourne University academic, in a study commissioned by the AFL. Lawson's study found that AFL club participation rates in Sydney had stalled, and that the AFL was masking low figures by using short-term, non-club affiliated Auskick participants and comparing them to competitive junior club participation numbers in other sports.

== Sponsors ==
=== Australia ===
- Simpson (2002–2005)

== Outside Australia ==
Outside Australia, Auskick programs exist in the following countries:

- Hong Kong
- Nauru
- United Kingdom

Auskick exists under a different name in the following countries:

- Fiji (Bulakick) (Note: "Bula" (Fijian pronunciation: [mbula]) is Fijian for "hello".)
- New Zealand (Kiwi Kick)
- Papua New Guinea (Niukick) (Note: Blend of "Niugini" (Tok Pisin for "New Guinea", same as Air Niugini) and "kick".)
- Solomon Islands (Solkick) (Note: Blend of "Solomon" and "kick".)
- South Africa (Footy Wild)
- United States (Ausball)
- Vanuatu (Pikinini Kick) (Note: "Pikinini" is Bislama for "child".)
