= Dick Atkinson =

Australian rules footballer

Personal information
- Full name: Dick Atkinson
- Born: 30 June 1934
- Original team: Old Melburnians
- Height: 183 cm (6 ft 0 in)
- Weight: 88 kg (194 lb)

Playing career^{1}
Years	Club	Games (Goals)
1955, 1957	Melbourne	7 (0)
- ^{1} Playing statistics correct to the end of 1957.

Dick Atkinson (born 30 June 1934) is a former Australian rules footballer who played with Melbourne in the Victorian Football League (VFL).

== See also ==
- Australian football at the 1956 Summer Olympics
