= Bernie Lee =

Australian rules footballer

Personal information
- Full name: Bernie Lee
- Born: 20 March 1937
- Original team: Footscray Thirds
- Height: 182 cm (6 ft 0 in)
- Weight: 75 kg (165 lb)

Playing career^{1}
Years	Club	Games (Goals)
1957–1963	Footscray	95 (8)
- ^{1} Playing statistics correct to the end of 1963.

Bernie Lee (born 20 March 1937) is a former Australian rules footballer who played with Footscray in the Victorian Football League (VFL).

Lee was Footscray's full-back in the 1961 VFL Grand Final, which they lost. He could also play across halfback.
