= John Quarrell =

Australian rules footballer

Personal information
- Full name: Edward John Quarrell
- Born: 22 January 1938; Cobden, Victoria
- Died: 17 July 2000 (aged 62); Joyner, Queensland
- Original team: Terang
- Height: 178 cm (5 ft 10 in)
- Weight: 76 kg (168 lb)

Playing career^{1}
Years	Club	Games (Goals)
1957–1962	Footscray	53 (17)
- ^{1} Playing statistics correct to the end of 1962.

Edward John Quarrell (22 January 1938 – 17 July 2000) was an Australian rules footballer who played with Footscray in the Victorian Football League (VFL).

== Family ==
The son of Edward John Quarrell sen. (1909–1943) and Rita Evelyn Quarrell, nee Willingham (1902–1938), Edward John Quarrell was born at Cobden, Victoria on 22 January 1938. His mother died as result of complications from his birth. His father enlisted in the Australian Army in 1941, leaving John and his sister in the care of his aunt (their great-aunt) in Terang. Edward John Quarrell sen. was subsequently taken as a prisoner of war and died in Hainan Island, China on 2 February 1943.

== Football ==
A left footer from Terang, Quarrell played his initial games at Footscray on match permits, as he had been refused a clearance. He played his football on the wing or as a half forward flanker, which was from where he kicked two goals in the 1961 VFL Grand Final loss to Hawthorn.
