= Frank Dunin =

Australian rules footballer (1935–2025)

Personal information
- Full name: Francis Xavier Dunin
- Born: 29 June 1935; East Melbourne, Australia
- Died: 14 May 2025 (aged 89); The Alfred Hospital, Prahran, Victoria, Australia
- Original team: University Blues
- Height: 190 cm (6 ft 3 in)
- Weight: 92 kg (203 lb)
- Position: Centre half forward/ centre half back/ Ruck

Playing career
Years	Club	Games (Goals)
1953, 1955–59	Richmond	69 (30)

Career highlights
- VFL Olympic Team, 1956; 4th Richmond Best & Fairest, 1955

Francis Xavier Dunin (29 June 1935 – 14 May 2025) was an Australian rules footballer who played with Richmond in the Victorian Football League (VFL).

== Family ==
The son of Victor John Dunin (1906-1998), and Maxine Veronica Dunin (1908–1970), née Hickey, Francis Xavier Dunin was born at Mena House Private Hospital, in East Melbourne on 29 June 1935.

== Football ==
Dunin usually played in key positions including the ruck, centre-half-forward and centre-half-back.

=== Richmond (VFL) ===
Recruited from University Blues in the Victorian Amateur Football Association (VAFA) in 1953. Although he was residentially tied to Melbourne, he came to Richmond by an arrangement that transferred the 16-match Richmond footballer Peter Schofield to Melbourne. He was released by Richmond for the entire 1954 season, so that he could pursue his agricultural science studies at the Dookie Agricultural College in the Goulburn Valley of Victoria.

He spent six seasons at Richmond before he was forced to retire at the age of 24, due to a knee injury.

=== VFL/VFA Combined Team at 1956 Melbourne Olympics ===
Dunin was selected in the VFL/VFA Combined Team's training squad to play in an Australian Rules football match against a Combined Victorian Amateur Football Association (VAFA) team at the Melbourne Cricket Ground (MCG) (i.e., the official "main stadium" of the 1956 Olympics"), on Friday, 7 December 1956, as one of the two Demonstration sports at the 1956 Melbourne Summer Olympics (the other, men's baseball, was played at the MCG on 1 December 1965).

Two teams of 18 players and two reserves took the field at 4:10 PM — the VAFA team wearing a white guernsey emblazoned with the Olympic rings on its front, with an emerald green trim, and white socks with green sock-tops, and the VFL/VFA Combined Team wearing an emerald green guernsey emblazoned with the Olympic rings on its front, with a white trim, and green socks with white sock-tops — immediately after the Bronze medal soccer match between Bulgarian and India. The cinder running track meant that the playing area was restricted to 170 x 145 yards.

Dunin, playing as a resting forward-pocket ruckman, kicked three goals, and was one of the best in a losing side: 8.7 (55) to 12.9 (81).

== Coach ==
Once he retired he became actively involved in coaching. He coached University Blacks in the VAFA from 1961 to 1967, winning a B grade premiership in 1964, and an A Grade premiership in 1965. He was the coach of the Victorian Amateurs in 1966 and 1967, with the Victorian Amateurs winning the 1967 Australian Amateur Carnival.

He was coach of the Australian National University team in the Canberra Australian National Football League (CANFL) for two years: 1968 and 1969. He was, later, involved with the Manuka and Southern Districts Clubs in the ACT, as both a committeeman and selector.

== Agricultural scientist ==
Away from football, Dunin held a degree in agricultural science and was a leading scientist in this field in Australia. He was also involved in producing scientific-related publications.

== Death ==
Dunin died at the Alfred Hospital, Prahran, on 14 May 2025, at the age of 89.

== See also ==
- Australian football at the 1956 Summer Olympics
