= Keith Beamish =

Australian rules footballer

Personal information
- Full name: Keith Beamish
- Born: 12 February 1941
- Original team: North Footscray
- Height: 170 cm (5 ft 7 in)
- Weight: 67 kg (148 lb)

Playing career^{1}
Years	Club	Games (Goals)
1959–1961	Footscray	34 (23)
- ^{1} Playing statistics correct to the end of 1961.

Keith Beamish (born 12 February 1941) is a former Australian rules footballer who played with Footscray in the Victorian Football League (VFL).

Beamish was a rover, recruited locally from North Footscray, who played three league seasons for Footscray.

After struggling with injuries in the previous two years, Beamish played 20 consecutive games in 1961.

He started as a forward pocket in the 1961 VFL Grand Final, which Footscray lost to Hawthorn. An injury saw him replaced at half time and he didn't play another senior game for the club, spending 1962 in the seconds.
