= Sted Hay =

Australian rules footballer

Personal information
- Full name: Steadman Hay
- Born: 1 June 1939 (age 87)
- Original team: Trinity Pres
- Height: 180 cm (5 ft 11 in)
- Weight: 86 kg (190 lb)

Playing career^{1}
Years	Club	Games (Goals)
1959–1964	Hawthorn	78 (3)
- ^{1} Playing statistics correct to the end of 1964.

Steadman "Sted" Hay (born 1 June 1939) is a former Australian rules footballer who played for Hawthorn in the VFL. He played as a half back flanker. He played in that position in Hawthorn's initial premiership in 1961.

Sted is one of three brothers that played at Hawthorn older brother Bill and middle brother Phil.
