= Cam McPherson =

Australian rules footballer

Personal information
- Born: 24 May 1940
- Original team: Shepparton (GVFL)
- Height: 180 cm (5 ft 11 in)
- Weight: 80 kg (176 lb)

Playing career^{1}
| Years | Club | Games (Goals) |
| 1959–1966 | Hawthorn | 104 (0) |
- ^{1} Playing statistics correct to the end of 1966.

Alexander Campbell "Cam" McPherson (born 24 May 1940) is a former Australian rules footballer who played for Hawthorn in the Victorian Football League (VFL).

A half back flanker from Shepparton, McPherson played over 100 games for Hawthorn and was a member of the club's first-ever premiership side.
