= Graham Arthur =

Australian rules footballer (1936–2021)

Personal information
- Full name: Graham Francis Arthur
- Born: 9 June 1936
- Died: 10 January 2021 (aged 84)
- Original team: Sandhurst (BFL)
- Height: 180 cm (5 ft 11 in)
- Weight: 86 kg (190 lb)

Playing career^{1}
Years	Club	Games (Goals)
1955–1968	Hawthorn	232 (201)

Representative team honours
Years	Team	Games (Goals)
	Victoria	12 (7)

Coaching career^{3}
Years	Club	Games (W–L–D)
1964–1965	Hawthorn	36 (17–19–0)
- ^{1} Playing statistics correct to the end of 1968.^{3} Coaching statistics correct as of 1965.

Career highlights
- VFL premiership player: 1961; 3× Hawthorn best and fairest: 1955, 1958, 1962; Hawthorn captain: 1960–1968; Australian Football Hall of Fame; Hawthorn Hall of Fame – Legend status; Hawthorn Team of the Century – Captain

Graham Francis Arthur (9 June 1936 – 10 January 2021) was an Australian rules footballer who played for the Hawthorn Football Club in the Victorian Football League (VFL).

== Career ==
Arthur played primarily as a half forward, debuting while still only 18 years old.

He was the captain of the first Hawthorn side to win the Grand Final and made a dozen appearances for the Victorian state team.

Following his career at Hawthorn, Arthur was appointed playing coach of Bendigo Football League club Echuca and led them to the 1970 premiership.

Arthur was named captain of Hawthorn's official Team of the Century.

Arthur supported the planned merger between Hawthorn and Melbourne in 1996.

Arthur was inducted into the Australian Football Hall of Fame in the initial intake in 1996, his citation reading:

Hawthorn's first premiership captain was a brilliant half-forward flanker/centreman.

Arthur's father Alan Arthur played for Essendon.

On 24 October 2000, Arthur was awarded the Australian Sports Medal for his contribution to Australian football.

== Statistics ==
=== Coaching statistics ===
Legend
W	Wins	L	Losses	D	Draws	W%	Winning percentage	LP	Ladder position	LT	League teams

Season	Team	Games	W	L	D	W %	LP	LT
1964	Hawthorn	18	13	5	0	72.2%	5	12
1965	Hawthorn	18	4	14	0	22.2%	12	12
Career totals		36	17	19	0	47.2%		

== Honours and achievements ==
Team

- VFL premiership player (Hawthorn): 1961
- 2× Minor premiership (Hawthorn): 1961, 1963

Individual

- VFL premiership captain: 1961
- 3× Hawthorn best and fairest: 1955, 1958, 1962
- Hawthorn captain: 1960–1968 (most games played as captain – 153)
- Australian Football Hall of Fame
- Hawthorn Hall of Fame – Legend status
- Hawthorn Team of the Century – Captain
- Hawthorn life member
