= Phil Rochow =

Australian rules footballer

Personal information
- Full name: Philip John Rochow
- Born: 26 February 1937
- Died: 26 December 2013 (aged 76); Palmwoods, Queensland
- Original team: Coburg Amateurs
- Height: 183 cm (6 ft 0 in)
- Weight: 82 kg (181 lb)

Playing career^{1}
Years	Club	Games (Goals)
1957	Fitzroy	1 (0)
- ^{1} Playing statistics correct to the end of 1957.

Philip John Rochow (26 February 1937 – 26 December 2013) was an Australian rules footballer who played with Fitzroy in the Victorian Football League (VFL).

Phil's brother Keith Rochow also played football for Fitzroy during the 1957 VFL season.

== See also ==
- Australian football at the 1956 Summer Olympics
