= Geoff Hibbins =

Australian rules footballer (1929–2018)

Personal information
- Full name: Geoff Hibbins
- Born: 13 November 1929
- Died: 10 March 2018 (aged 88)
- Original team: Wesley Collegians
- Height: 183 cm (6 ft 0 in)
- Weight: 89 kg (196 lb)
- Position: Ruck

Playing career^{1}
Years	Club	Games (Goals)
1952–54	St Kilda	33 (5)
- ^{1} Playing statistics correct to the end of 1954.

Geoff Hibbins (13 November 1929 – 10 March 2018) was an Australian rules footballer who played with St Kilda in the Victorian Football League (VFL).

== See also ==
- Australian football at the 1956 Summer Olympics
