= Matthew Robbins (footballer) =

Australian rules footballer

Personal information
- Born: 8 May 1977 (age 49)
- Original team: Ormond / Central U18
- Debut: Round 17, 27 July 1996, Geelong vs. St Kilda, at Waverley Park
- Height: 178 cm (5 ft 10 in)
- Weight: 87 kg (192 lb)

Playing career^{1}
Years	Club	Games (Goals)
1996–1997	Geelong	7 (0)
1999–2007	Western Bulldogs	139 (135)
Total		146 (135)
- ^{1} Playing statistics correct to the end of 2007.

Matthew Robbins (born 8 May 1977) is a former Australian rules footballer who played with both Geelong and the Western Bulldogs in the AFL.

Recruited to the Geelong Football Club with pick 36 in the 1994 AFL draft, Robbins played only 7 games in his 3 seasons at the Cats, being traded to the Western Bulldogs for the 1998 season.

He developed into an elite small forward option for the Bulldogs, and in 2005 took a one handed mark against the Brisbane Lions in Round 18 which was one of the spectacular highlights of the AFL in the 21st century. Unfortunately, it was controversially snubbed for the 2005 Toyota Mark of the Year Award. Robbins finished with 31 goals from 16 games in 2005.

Robbins kicked 45 goals in 2006 as a small forward, and in 2007 fell out of favour with the coaching staff and managed only a handful of senior games. By falling out of form and out of favour with the coaching staff Robbins was compelled to announce his retirement following the end of the 2007 season. He kicked three goals in his last game against the Kangaroos, in which was also Luke Darcy's last game. At the conclusion of the match, both Robbins and Darcy were chaired from the ground and given a guard of honour from both teams.

Robbins attended Salesian College.

Robbins has expressed his wish to continue playing football in 2008, quoting that he would like to play in the VFL, or play amateur football with his brothers at Ormond.
