= Phil Hay (footballer) =

Australian rules footballer (1938–2026)

Personal information
- Born: 7 February 1938
- Died: 29 May 2026 (aged 88)
- Original team: Trinity Pres
- Height: 180 cm (5 ft 11 in)
- Weight: 76 kg (168 lb)

Playing career
Years	Club	Games (Goals)
1960–1966	Hawthorn	107 (20)

Phil Hay (7 February 1938 – 29 May 2026) was an Australian rules footballer who played for Hawthorn in the VFL during the 1960s.

Hay played in a variety of positions at the start of his career and was the 19th man in Hawthorn's 1961 premiership side, their first. When Les Kaine left the club at the end of the 1962 season, Hay took his place at fullback. It was there that he played his best football and finished equal second in the 1964 Brownlow Medal count.

Phil is one of three brothers that played at Hawthorn with older brother Bill and younger brother Sted. Hay died on 29 May 2026, at the age of 88.
