= Keith Rochow =

Australian rules footballer

Personal information
- Full name: Raymond Keith Rochow
- Born: 14 March 1934
- Died: 8 December 2014 (aged 80)
- Original team: Coburg Amateurs
- Height: 188 cm (6 ft 2 in)
- Weight: 86 kg (190 lb)

Playing career^{1}
Years	Club	Games (Goals)
1957	Fitzroy	4 (1)
- ^{1} Playing statistics correct to the end of 1957.

Raymond Keith Rochow OAM (14 March 1934 – 8 December 2014) was an Australian rules footballer who played with Fitzroy in the Victorian Football League (VFL).

Keith's brother Phil Rochow also played with Fitzroy during the 1957 VFL season.

In 2014, Keith Rochow was awarded a Medal of the Order of Australia (OAM) for his extended "service to the community through sporting, child and aged care organisations."
