= Bill Serong =

Australian rules footballer (1936–2024)

Personal information
- Full name: William Michael Serong
- Born: 5 May 1936
- Died: 20 May 2024 (aged 88)
- Original team: CBC Parade
- Height: 183 cm (6 ft 0 in)
- Weight: 83 kg (183 lb)

Playing career^{1}
Years	Club	Games (Goals)
1956–1961	Collingwood	98 (52)
1962	North Melbourne	16 (8)
Total		114 (60)
- ^{1} Playing statistics correct to the end of 1962.

William Michael Serong (5 May 1936 – 20 May 2024) was an Australian rules footballer who played for Collingwood and North Melbourne in the VFL.

Serong went to the Christian Brothers' College in Victoria Parade, and was the Australian handball champion in 1974, aged 38.

== Football ==
Serong usually played as a centreman but was also seen on the half forward flanks. He made his league debut in 1956 with Collingwood and played in their 1958 premiership side as well as two losing grand finals with the club. In 1959 he placed equal second in the Brownlow Medal count. He finished his career with a season at North Melbourne in 1962, winning their best and fairest award.

He was captain-coach of Echuca in the 1963 and 1964 Bendigo Football League seasons. Serong won the 1965 - Bendigo FL best and fairest award, the Michelsen Medal. Serong also won Echuca's best and fairest award in 1964 and 1965.

Serong played one game for Camberwell Football Club in 1967.

== Death ==
Serong died on 20 May 2024, at the age of 88.

== See also ==
- Australian football at the 1956 Summer Olympics

== Sources ==
- A Smash Hit, The Age, (Thursday, 25 March 1965), p.28.
