= Ormond Amateur Football Club =

Ormond Football Club

Names
- Full name: Ormond Amateur Football Club
- Nickname: Monders
- Club song: "It's A Grand Old Flag"

Club details
- Founded: 1931; 95 years ago
- Colours: Brown Blue
- Competition: Victorian Amateur Football Association
- President: Jason Burt
- Coach: Kyle Pinto
- Ground: E.E. Gunn Reserve

Uniforms
Home

Other information
- Official website: oafc.com.au

The Ormond Amateur Football Club, nicknamed the Monders, is an Australian rules football club based in the Melbourne suburb of Ormond. It was founded in 1931, making it the second-oldest suburban present-day club in the Victorian Amateur Football Association (VAFA).

As of 2024, the club competes in Division 1 of the VAFA.

== History ==
The club was founded in the early years of the Great Depression. A local businessman named Les Smith, believed that the local young people needed a constructive way to channel their energies in difficult times, and that he was able to help them do that through sport. Smith had himself been nurtured as a young player of Australian Rules Football in the Albert Park State School team, which included himself, Roy Cazaly and Frank Beaurepaire. All three had been presented with their uniforms by Henry Harrison, a founding member of the Australian Rules game in the early 1860s.

At the beginning of the 1930s, Smith approached a friend, Councillor Ernie Gunn, to prevail on the local council for a grant of land. Gunn arranged this, and in 1931 the Ormond Amateur Football Club was born. Smith served as president for most of the years between the first playing season, 1932, and 1959.

Les Smith's daughter, Betty Macgregor, recalls the club's foundation:

Dad was a champion footballer in the bush in his youth. He was dubbed the "Gippsland Flyer". He was training with South Melbourne when World War One broke out. Our family moved back to the city from Maffra at the start of the Depression, and we opened a newsagency on the corner of North Road and Newham Grove in Ormond. It was here that a lot of the planning was done to establish the club.

Of course it was a group effort. The original nucleus of founders included Cec Hattam, Mick Hassett, Peter Dawson and "Doc" Porter. Fred Yewdall was an early player who later went on to serve on the committee, so he was also involved with the club in one way or another from the early years.

I remember Ernie Gunn as a very nice man, and a solid citizen. He was keen to help in any way he could. He made it all possible, by arranging for Council to give us some land. My Dad's regimental colours from World War One - brown and blue - were chosen as the Ormond club colours.

The first function the club had was an afternoon fancy dress party to raise funds. I would have been seven or eight. Everyone met outside the newsagency. Dad came out dressed as a policeman, then they were on their way amid great hilarity - marching down Newham Grove to the ground, where they had a function to celebrate the birth of the club.

Training was on Tuesday and Thursday. On Sunday morning everyone gathered at the ground for a post-mortem of the previous day's game, to assess injuries, and plan for the next week. Everyone came to that - players, groundsmen and committee.

Dad served as president for many years. Mum and Dad threw many parties and gatherings for Ormond players and committee members. Our family's lives revolved around the club for years.

My Uncle Roy Smith - Dad's younger brother - was the club's rep on the Amateur Football Association. He was a leading wine judge, and would bring a flask of sherry to the game. At three-quarter time he would offer players a nip, which some availed themselves of. Mum would pack a hamper for these events, and bring the car to the edge of the oval. We'd watch the game from there. At three-quarter time we'd have afternoon tea.

Dave McNamara, one of the VFL's pre-War greats, came out of retirement to play some games with Ormond. I remember him putting the ball on the ground and doing place kicks. Bob Flegg was Ormond's most brilliant full forward of that time - he was later killed in the War. You would often get a few hundred to a match in those days. If it were a final, it would be a few thousand.

After each home match, those who liked a drink would adjourn to McKinnon's Hotel. The session wouldn't go long, due to six o'clock closing. We'd wait outside with Mum in the car till the pub shut.

We had a picture night at the local cinema sometimes. At one I remember, Clay Crooks was presented with a medal for kicking 19 goals in a match.

My husband, Evan Macgregor, played for Ormond in the early 1950s, and was captain in 1952. When Ormond won the A Grade premiership in 1950, we had a huge party at my parents' home, and then adjourned to various other homes until 3AM or so.

As for my father, he remained deeply involved with the club till his death. It was his passion in life.

At Les Smith's funeral in 1968, so many of the "Ormond family" arrived to pay respects that there was standing room only.

In an article in the club's newsletter, "The Brown & Blue Review" (reprinted in "The Amateur Footballer"), Ormond's long-standing club doctor, JR "Doc" Porter, wrote:

On behalf of the Ormond Amateur Football Club - members, executives and supporters - I present to you a memoir of the grand old man of Ormond, Les Smith... Les Smith was one of nature's ten-footers in the moral and spiritual measure of earthly existence.... His action in starting the ball rolling for the formation of the OAFC was partly coloured by his concern for the youngsters of the district... He was a stickler for the right method or approach and set standards so many of us were pleased to try and maintain...

== AFL/VFL players ==
In all over forty Ormond footballers have played VFL/AFL football and include the following:

- Joel Armartey, Sydney
- Harry Armstrong, Richmond
- Barry Beecroft, South Melbourne
- Jack Bray, St Kilda
- Peter Brenchley, Melbourne, 1957 premiership
- Simon Buckley, Melbourne, Collingwood
- Neil Crompton, Melbourne, 1964 premiership
- Neville Crowe, Richmond, later president
- Sam Davidson, Western Bulldogs
- Simon Eishold, Melbourne
- Dick Fenton-Smith, Melbourne, 1957 and 1959 premierships
- Sam Frost
- Jack Frost
- Max Gawn, Melbourne
- Jack Higgins, Richmond, St Kilda
- Ron Irwin (footballer), Melbourne, 1943-47
- Ricky Jackson, Melbourne
- Dave McNamara, St Kilda (1905–08, 1914–15, 1918–19, 1921–23), played for Ormond from 1924 to 1929.
- Laurie Mithen, Melbourne, 1955–57, 1959–60 premierships
- Michael Oaten, South Melbourne
- Roy Quinn, Richmond, 1943 premiership & North Melbourne
- Matthew Robbins, Geelong & Western Bulldogs
- Steven Smith, Melbourne
- Will Thursfield, Richmond
- Brian Walsh, St Kilda
- Colin Wilson, Melbourne, 1957 premiership
