= John Fisher (footballer, born 1937) =

Australian rules footballer

Personal information
- Born: 10 October 1937
- Died: 24 January 1998 (aged 60)
- Original team: Warburton
- Height: 179 cm (5 ft 10 in)
- Weight: 73 kg (161 lb)

Playing career^{1}
Years	Club	Games (Goals)
1957–1965	Hawthorn	94 (9)
- ^{1} Playing statistics correct to the end of 1965.

John Fisher (10 October 1937 – 24 January 1998) was an Australian rules footballer who played for Hawthorn in the VFL.

A wingman, Fisher debuted for Hawthorn in 1957 but it took a couple of seasons before he became a regular in the side. He won the Gardiner Medal in 1958 for the best player in the VFL reserves competition.
