= 1961 VFL season =

65th season of the Victorian Football League (VFL)

1961 VFL premiership season
- Teams: 12
- Premiers: Hawthorn; 1st premiership
- Minor premiers: Hawthorn; 1st minor premiership
- Consolation series: Geelong; 1st Consolation series win
- Brownlow Medallist: John James (Carlton)
- Coleman Medallist: Tom Carroll (Carlton)
- Matches played: 112
- Highest: 107,935

The 1961 VFL season was the 65th season of the Victorian Football League (VFL), the highest level senior Australian rules football competition in Victoria. The season featured twelve clubs, ran from 15 April until 23 September, and comprised an 18-game home-and-away season followed by a finals series featuring the top four clubs.

The premiership was won by the Hawthorn Football Club for the first time, after it defeated Footscray by 43 points in the 1961 VFL Grand Final.

== Background ==
In 1961, the VFL competition consisted of twelve teams of 18 on-the-field players each, plus two substitute players, known as the 19th man and the 20th man. A player could be substituted for any reason; however, once substituted, a player could not return to the field of play under any circumstances.

Teams played each other in a home-and-away season of 18 rounds; matches 12 to 18 were the "home-and-way reverse" of matches 1 to 7.

Once the 18 round home-and-away season had finished, the 1961 VFL Premiers were determined by the specific format and conventions of the Page–McIntyre system.

== Home-and-away season ==
=== Round 1 ===
Home team	Home team score	Away team	Away team score	Venue	Crowd	Date
Hawthorn	7.14 (56)	South Melbourne	11.15 (81)	Glenferrie Oval	20,000	15 April 1961
Fitzroy	6.10 (46)	Melbourne	10.15 (75)	Brunswick Street Oval	31,787	15 April 1961
Richmond	11.8 (74)	Footscray	15.12 (102)	Punt Road Oval	20,000	15 April 1961
North Melbourne	8.10 (58)	Essendon	6.13 (49)	Arden Street Oval	24,000	15 April 1961
Geelong	13.18 (96)	Collingwood	8.9 (57)	Kardinia Park	23,973	15 April 1961
St Kilda	5.8 (38)	Carlton	6.12 (48)	Junction Oval	30,400	15 April 1961

=== Round 2 ===
Home team	Home team score	Away team	Away team score	Venue	Crowd	Date
Footscray	13.19 (97)	North Melbourne	8.4 (52)	Western Oval	22,178	22 April 1961
Essendon	13.7 (85)	St Kilda	9.15 (69)	Windy Hill	23,000	22 April 1961
Collingwood	3.16 (34)	Richmond	7.15 (57)	Victoria Park	23,000	22 April 1961
Carlton	9.5 (59)	Fitzroy	6.18 (54)	Princes Park	29,384	22 April 1961
Melbourne	5.14 (44)	Hawthorn	11.10 (76)	MCG	34,640	22 April 1961
South Melbourne	12.8 (80)	Geelong	12.12 (84)	Lake Oval	24,258	22 April 1961

=== Round 3 ===
Home team	Home team score	Away team	Away team score	Venue	Crowd	Date
Richmond	6.9 (45)	South Melbourne	12.17 (89)	Punt Road Oval	27,650	25 April 1961
Essendon	8.9 (57)	Melbourne	11.16 (82)	Windy Hill	32,000	25 April 1961
Collingwood	12.16 (88)	North Melbourne	9.8 (62)	Victoria Park	26,574	29 April 1961
Carlton	11.6 (72)	Footscray	11.15 (81)	Princes Park	34,254	29 April 1961
St Kilda	12.11 (83)	Geelong	6.14 (50)	Junction Oval	29,300	29 April 1961
Hawthorn	13.17 (95)	Fitzroy	10.9 (69)	Glenferrie Oval	21,500	29 April 1961

=== Round 4 ===
Home team	Home team score	Away team	Away team score	Venue	Crowd	Date
Melbourne	12.9 (81)	St Kilda	12.12 (84)	MCG	40,572	6 May 1961
Fitzroy	13.17 (95)	Richmond	16.12 (108)	Brunswick Street Oval	17,861	6 May 1961
North Melbourne	8.7 (55)	Hawthorn	12.13 (85)	Arden Street Oval	13,500	6 May 1961
Geelong	7.19 (61)	Essendon	22.11 (143)	Kardinia Park	21,437	6 May 1961
Footscray	10.13 (73)	Collingwood	10.4 (64)	Western Oval	34,029	6 May 1961
South Melbourne	7.14 (56)	Carlton	11.6 (72)	Lake Oval	25,624	6 May 1961

=== Round 5 ===
Home team	Home team score	Away team	Away team score	Venue	Crowd	Date
Richmond	13.7 (85)	St Kilda	11.20 (86)	Punt Road Oval	22,000	13 May 1961
Geelong	7.13 (55)	Melbourne	17.18 (120)	Kardinia Park	18,673	13 May 1961
Collingwood	8.7 (55)	Fitzroy	16.20 (116)	Victoria Park	30,560	13 May 1961
South Melbourne	12.12 (84)	Footscray	12.10 (82)	Lake Oval	26,748	13 May 1961
Hawthorn	9.21 (75)	Essendon	12.4 (76)	Glenferrie Oval	31,000	13 May 1961
North Melbourne	11.17 (83)	Carlton	17.7 (109)	Arden Street Oval	21,500	13 May 1961

=== Round 6 ===
Home team	Home team score	Away team	Away team score	Venue	Crowd	Date
Fitzroy	14.13 (97)	North Melbourne	11.13 (79)	Brunswick Street Oval	17,693	20 May 1961
Essendon	20.13 (133)	South Melbourne	6.18 (54)	Windy Hill	32,600	20 May 1961
Richmond	9.14 (68)	Geelong	16.16 (112)	Punt Road Oval	24,600	20 May 1961
Footscray	9.8 (62)	Melbourne	13.9 (87)	Western Oval	29,490	27 May 1961
Carlton	9.11 (65)	Collingwood	7.12 (54)	Princes Park	33,161	27 May 1961
St Kilda	14.16 (100)	Hawthorn	12.9 (81)	Junction Oval	32,900	27 May 1961

=== Round 7 ===
Home team	Home team score	Away team	Away team score	Venue	Crowd	Date
North Melbourne	9.14 (68)	St Kilda	11.16 (82)	Arden Street Oval	13,000	3 June 1961
Hawthorn	10.13 (73)	Richmond	8.12 (60)	Glenferrie Oval	15,000	3 June 1961
Collingwood	18.11 (119)	Essendon	8.10 (58)	Victoria Park	28,290	3 June 1961
Geelong	13.13 (91)	Footscray	4.14 (38)	Kardinia Park	18,683	3 June 1961
South Melbourne	7.8 (50)	Fitzroy	17.15 (117)	Lake Oval	14,500	3 June 1961
Melbourne	15.14 (104)	Carlton	11.13 (79)	MCG	49,678	3 June 1961

=== Round 8 ===
Home team	Home team score	Away team	Away team score	Venue	Crowd	Date
St Kilda	16.14 (110)	South Melbourne	5.16 (46)	Junction Oval	28,800	10 June 1961
North Melbourne	11.13 (79)	Geelong	11.13 (79)	Arden Street Oval	16,000	10 June 1961
Fitzroy	10.14 (74)	Essendon	6.18 (54)	Brunswick Street Oval	28,083	10 June 1961
Footscray	14.19 (103)	Hawthorn	13.13 (91)	Western Oval	24,132	12 June 1961
Carlton	7.7 (49)	Richmond	13.11 (89)	Princes Park	24,660	12 June 1961
Melbourne	17.19 (121)	Collingwood	7.10 (52)	MCG	78,465	12 June 1961

=== Round 9 ===
Home team	Home team score	Away team	Away team score	Venue	Crowd	Date
Geelong	9.7 (61)	Hawthorn	10.10 (70)	Kardinia Park	14,197	17 June 1961
Collingwood	14.10 (94)	St Kilda	12.12 (84)	Victoria Park	27,280	17 June 1961
Richmond	12.10 (82)	North Melbourne	10.16 (76)	Punt Road Oval	10,000	17 June 1961
South Melbourne	8.14 (62)	Melbourne	14.14 (98)	Lake Oval	10,200	17 June 1961
Footscray	9.5 (59)	Fitzroy	9.9 (63)	Western Oval	21,197	17 June 1961
Essendon	12.17 (89)	Carlton	7.12 (54)	Windy Hill	23,000	17 June 1961

=== Round 10 ===
Home team	Home team score	Away team	Away team score	Venue	Crowd	Date
Collingwood	12.12 (84)	South Melbourne	6.8 (44)	Victoria Park	24,637	24 June 1961
North Melbourne	5.14 (44)	Melbourne	14.9 (93)	Arden Street Oval	11,500	24 June 1961
St Kilda	8.11 (59)	Footscray	4.13 (37)	Junction Oval	28,100	24 June 1961
Geelong	9.10 (64)	Fitzroy	8.9 (57)	Kardinia Park	16,881	24 June 1961
Richmond	12.20 (92)	Essendon	10.14 (74)	Punt Road Oval	23,000	24 June 1961
Hawthorn	12.6 (78)	Carlton	6.10 (46)	Glenferrie Oval	21,500	24 June 1961

=== Round 11 ===
Home team	Home team score	Away team	Away team score	Venue	Crowd	Date
Melbourne	17.18 (120)	Richmond	7.12 (54)	MCG	38,000	1 July 1961
Fitzroy	9.9 (63)	St Kilda	9.8 (62)	Brunswick Street Oval	19,291	1 July 1961
Essendon	12.11 (83)	Footscray	13.14 (92)	Windy Hill	22,440	1 July 1961
Carlton	10.18 (78)	Geelong	17.16 (118)	Princes Park	17,936	1 July 1961
South Melbourne	9.14 (68)	North Melbourne	7.8 (50)	Lake Oval	8,750	1 July 1961
Hawthorn	13.12 (90)	Collingwood	4.12 (36)	Glenferrie Oval	31,500	1 July 1961

=== Round 12 ===
Home team	Home team score	Away team	Away team score	Venue	Crowd	Date
Footscray	6.6 (42)	Richmond	4.9 (33)	Western Oval	16,648	8 July 1961
Essendon	9.9 (63)	North Melbourne	3.10 (28)	Windy Hill	12,800	8 July 1961
Collingwood	5.11 (41)	Geelong	8.10 (58)	Victoria Park	20,700	8 July 1961
Carlton	9.8 (62)	St Kilda	3.12 (30)	Princes Park	14,636	8 July 1961
South Melbourne	7.7 (49)	Hawthorn	9.11 (65)	Lake Oval	13,860	8 July 1961
Melbourne	6.8 (44)	Fitzroy	6.8 (44)	MCG	29,947	8 July 1961

=== Round 13 ===
Home team	Home team score	Away team	Away team score	Venue	Crowd	Date
Hawthorn	8.10 (58)	Melbourne	5.10 (40)	Glenferrie Oval	27,500	15 July 1961
North Melbourne	10.15 (75)	Footscray	11.6 (72)	Arden Street Oval	15,000	15 July 1961
Richmond	5.8 (38)	Collingwood	6.18 (54)	Punt Road Oval	22,799	15 July 1961
Geelong	11.16 (82)	South Melbourne	9.13 (67)	Kardinia Park	18,489	22 July 1961
St Kilda	13.20 (98)	Essendon	7.8 (50)	Junction Oval	34,600	22 July 1961
Fitzroy	12.13 (85)	Carlton	9.22 (76)	Brunswick Street Oval	34,561	22 July 1961

=== Round 14 ===
Home team	Home team score	Away team	Away team score	Venue	Crowd	Date
Geelong	11.7 (73)	St Kilda	10.8 (68)	Kardinia Park	25,723	29 July 1961
Fitzroy	12.15 (87)	Hawthorn	13.16 (94)	Brunswick Street Oval	23,012	29 July 1961
South Melbourne	16.9 (105)	Richmond	9.14 (68)	Lake Oval	14,350	29 July 1961
Melbourne	10.18 (78)	Essendon	13.9 (87)	MCG	31,455	29 July 1961
North Melbourne	9.13 (67)	Collingwood	9.10 (64)	Arden Street Oval	15,000	29 July 1961
Footscray	12.11 (83)	Carlton	7.9 (51)	Western Oval	21,639	29 July 1961

=== Round 15 ===
Home team	Home team score	Away team	Away team score	Venue	Crowd	Date
Hawthorn	15.10 (100)	North Melbourne	6.11 (47)	Glenferrie Oval	14,000	5 August 1961
Essendon	13.16 (94)	Geelong	7.14 (56)	Windy Hill	27,500	5 August 1961
Collingwood	5.10 (40)	Footscray	11.12 (78)	Victoria Park	22,324	5 August 1961
Carlton	17.9 (111)	South Melbourne	7.10 (52)	Princes Park	16,889	5 August 1961
St Kilda	9.12 (66)	Melbourne	7.13 (55)	Junction Oval	33,100	5 August 1961
Richmond	9.9 (63)	Fitzroy	9.14 (68)	Punt Road Oval	15,547	5 August 1961

=== Round 16 ===
Home team	Home team score	Away team	Away team score	Venue	Crowd	Date
Footscray	14.17 (101)	South Melbourne	5.16 (46)	Western Oval	19,242	12 August 1961
Essendon	10.12 (72)	Hawthorn	11.13 (79)	Windy Hill	27,200	12 August 1961
Carlton	9.16 (70)	North Melbourne	10.8 (68)	Princes Park	15,439	12 August 1961
St Kilda	12.19 (91)	Richmond	0.8 (8)	Junction Oval	20,600	12 August 1961
Melbourne	12.17 (89)	Geelong	12.15 (87)	MCG	48,245	12 August 1961
Fitzroy	12.20 (92)	Collingwood	10.10 (70)	Brunswick Street Oval	23,768	12 August 1961

=== Round 17 ===
Home team	Home team score	Away team	Away team score	Venue	Crowd	Date
Hawthorn	19.6 (120)	St Kilda	14.7 (91)	Glenferrie Oval	34,500	19 August 1961
Geelong	11.11 (77)	Richmond	6.10 (46)	Kardinia Park	17,976	19 August 1961
Melbourne	11.22 (88)	Footscray	7.6 (48)	MCG	52,195	19 August 1961
North Melbourne	10.15 (75)	Fitzroy	8.15 (63)	Arden Street Oval	15,000	19 August 1961
South Melbourne	11.12 (78)	Essendon	16.11 (107)	Lake Oval	14,125	19 August 1961
Collingwood	10.12 (72)	Carlton	13.10 (88)	Victoria Park	31,849	19 August 1961

=== Round 18 ===
Home team	Home team score	Away team	Away team score	Venue	Crowd	Date
Footscray	12.12 (84)	Geelong	8.15 (63)	Western Oval	42,015	26 August 1961
Fitzroy	25.29 (179)	South Melbourne	11.10 (76)	Brunswick Street Oval	12,815	26 August 1961
Carlton	13.12 (90)	Melbourne	13.13 (91)	Princes Park	21,863	26 August 1961
St Kilda	10.12 (72)	North Melbourne	9.13 (67)	Junction Oval	24,250	26 August 1961
Richmond	8.8 (56)	Hawthorn	11.15 (81)	Punt Road Oval	15,177	26 August 1961
Essendon	12.16 (88)	Collingwood	13.10 (88)	Windy Hill	18,500	26 August 1961

== Ladder ==
(P)	Premiers
	Qualified for finals

#	Team	P	W	L	D	PF	PA	%	Pts
1	Hawthorn (P)	18	14	4	0	1467	1173	125.1	56
2	Melbourne	18	12	5	1	1510	1151	131.2	50
3	St Kilda	18	11	7	0	1373	1173	117.1	44
4	Footscray	18	11	7	0	1334	1216	109.7	44
5	Fitzroy	18	10	7	1	1469	1258	116.8	42
6	Geelong	18	10	7	1	1367	1362	100.4	42
7	Essendon	18	9	8	1	1462	1335	109.5	38
8	Carlton	18	9	9	0	1279	1325	96.5	36
9	Collingwood	18	5	12	1	1166	1375	84.8	22
10	Richmond	18	5	13	0	1126	1428	78.9	20
11	South Melbourne	18	5	13	0	1187	1644	72.2	20
12	North Melbourne	18	4	13	1	1133	1433	79.1	18

Rules for classification: 1. premiership points; 2. percentage; 3. points for
Average score: 73.5
Source: AFL Tables

== Finals series ==
=== Semi-finals ===
	First semi-final
SF1: Saturday, 2 September (2:30 pm)	St Kilda 8.12 (60)	def. by	Footscray 9.15 (69)	MCG (crowd: 86,411)	Report

	Second semi-final
SF2: Saturday, 9 September (2:30 pm)	Hawthorn 12.8 (80)	def.	Melbourne 11.7 (73)	MCG (crowd: 87,744)	Report

=== Preliminary final ===
	Preliminary final
Saturday, 16 September (2:30 pm)	Melbourne 8.10 (58)	def. by	Footscray 13.7 (85)	MCG (crowd: 86,118)	Report
Footscray qualified for their second VFL Grand Final and stopped Melbourne from playing what would have been their eighth consecutive grand final.

=== Grand final ===
	Grand Final
Saturday, 23 September (2:50 pm)	Hawthorn 13.16 (94)	def.	Footscray 7.9 (51)	MCG (crowd: 107,935)	Report
This was the first appearance in a grand final for Hawthorn.; This was the first grand final in league history which did not feature any of the VFL's foundation clubs.; Hawthorn won its maiden VFL/AFL premiership.

== Consolation night series competition ==
The night series were held under the floodlights at Lake Oval, South Melbourne, for the teams (5th to 12th on ladder) out of the finals at the end of the season.

Final: Geelong 9.20 (74) defeated North Melbourne 9.8 (62)

== Season notes ==
- St Kilda ended a twenty-two year finals appearance drought making the finals for the first time since 1939. This currently stands as the fourth longest finals appearance drought in league history. (Note: The three longer ones are: 1. Hawthorn from its first VFL season in 1925 did not make the finals until 1957; 2. South Melbourne, after losing the 1945 Grand Final did not make the finals again until 1970; 3. Melbourne, after winning the 1964 Grand Final did not make the finals again until 1987)
- Following a VFL investigation of a complaint that game officials had not reported the incident, rugged South Melbourne ruckman Ken Boyd was suspended for 12 matches, for striking Carlton ruckman John Nicholls.
- In Round 16, Richmond was held goalless by St Kilda. This was the first time a team had been held goalless in a match since Round 11, 1921; and (as of 2025) is the last time it has occurred.
- Having decided to abandon its (1957–1960) experiment of allowing live telecasts of the last quarter of three VFL matches each Saturday afternoon on ABV-2, HSV-7, and GTV-9, the VFL rejected offers from the three television stations to broadcast replays on Saturday evenings. A separate arrangement was made to allow a replay of the entire grand final match.
- In November, Collingwood announced that it has delisted sixteen players from its 1961 playing list, including Ian Brewer and Barry "Hooker" Harrison.

== Awards ==
- The 1961 VFL Premiership team was Hawthorn.
- The VFL's leading goalkicker was Tom Carroll of Carlton who kicked 54 goals.
- The winner of the 1961 Brownlow Medal was John James of Carlton with 21 votes.
- North Melbourne took the "wooden spoon" in 1961.
- The reserves premiership was won by St Kilda. St Kilda 7.14 (56) defeated Geelong 5.16 (46) in the grand final, which was held as a stand-alone match on 30 September because the second semi-final was drawn and required a replay; the match was played at the Melbourne Cricket Ground before a crowd of 15,242.

== Sources ==
- 1961 VFL season at AFL Tables
- 1961 VFL season at Australian Football
