= List of Essendon Football Club honours =

The Essendon Football Club, nicknamed The Bombers, is an Australian rules football club in the Australian Football League (AFL). Thought to have formed in 1872, Essendon played their first Victorian Football Association (VFA) game in 1873, before participating in the inaugural season of the Victorian Football League (now AFL) in 1897. Headquartered at the Essendon Recreation Reserve, Windy Hill, in the Melbourne suburb of Essendon, the club has won 16 VFL/AFL premierships, which, along with Carlton, is the most of any club.

The club best and fairest award is claimed by some to have been first given in 1897; however, there is no contemporary evidence that it actually existed prior to the late 1920s. Since 1959 or 1960, it has been known as the W. S. Crichton Medal. Dick Reynolds was awarded medal on a record-equalling seven occasions between 1934 and 1943. Reynolds also won the Brownlow Medal a club-record three times, in 1934, 1937 and 1938. The medal is awarded annually to the best and fairest player in the competition, currently on the basis of a 3–2–1 match-by-match voting system used by the match umpires.

Former Richmond player Kevin Sheedy coached Essendon for a record 635 games and four premierships in 27 seasons between 1980 and 2007, thus becoming the second-longest-serving coach in VFL/AFL history. Full-forward Matthew Lloyd is the club's leading goal-kicker, with 926, ahead of ruckman Simon Madden with 575. Lloyd was Essendon's leading goal-kicker on a record 12 occasions between 1997 and 2009, kicking 100 goals in a season during 2000 and 2001.

== Year ==
# Premiership

* Brownlow Medalist for that year

Year	Coach	Captain	W. S. Crichton Medal	Leading goalkicker
1897 #	—	George Stuckey	—	Norman Waugh (23)
1898	—	George Stuckey	—	Charlie Moore (20)
1899	—	George Stuckey	—	Arthur Cleghorn (15)
1900	—	George Stuckey	—	Albert Thurgood (25)
1901 #	—	Tod Collins	Albert Thurgood	Fred Hiskins (34)
1902	—	Tod Collins	—	Albert Thurgood (32)
1903	—	Jim Anderson	Hugh Gavin	Mick Madden (15)
1904	—	Jim Anderson / Hugh Gavin	—	Mick Madden (25)
1905	—	William Robinson	—	George Barker (29)
1906	—	Jack McKenzie	Jack McKenzie	Norman Yeo (31)
1907	—	Billy Griffith	—	Jim Martin (16)
1908	Dave Smith	Billy Griffith	Bill Busbridge	Dave Smith (26)
1909	Dave Smith	Billy Griffith	Bill Busbridge	Paddy Shea (40)
1910	Allan Belcher	Allan Belcher	—	Bert Armstrong (40)
1911 #	Jack Worrall	Dave Smith	Ernie Cameron	Lou Armstrong (35)
1912 #	Jack Worrall	Allan Belcher	Ernie Cameron	Jack Kirby (43)
1913	Jack Worrall	Allan Belcher	Fred Baring	Jack Kirby (29)
1914	Jack Worrall	Allan Belcher	—	Ernie Lumsden (28)
1915	Jack Worrall	Allan Belcher	—	Bill Walker (14)
1916	—	—	—	—
1917	—	—	—	—
1918	Jack Worrall	Fred Baring	—	Norm Hall (15)
1919	Jack Worrall	Allan Belcher	—	Dave Walsh (15)
1920	Percy Ogden	Percy Ogden	Jock Garden	Frank McDonald (33)
1921	Percy Ogden	Percy Ogden	—	Frank McDonald (17)
1922	Sam Gravenall	Sid Barker	Tom Fitzmaurice	Jack Moriarty (36)
1923 #	Sid Barker	Sid Barker	Tom Fitzmaurice	Greg Stockdale (68)
1924 #	Sid Barker	Sid Barker	Tom Fitzmaurice	Tommy Jenkins (50)
1925	Fred Maher	Frank Maher	Greg Stockdale	Tommy Jenkins (37)
1926	Fred Maher	Frank Maher	Joe Harrison	Greg Stockdale (36)
1927	Fred Maher	Frank Maher	Frank Maher	Jack Vosti (35)
1928	Charlie Hardy	Frank Maher	Norm Beckton	Greg Stockdale (39)
1929	Charlie Hardy	Norm Beckton	Howard Okey	Keith Forbes / Len Johnson (40)
1930	Charlie Hardy	Norm Beckton	Keith Forbes	Keith Forbes (54)
1931	Garnet Campbell	Garnet Campbell	Tom Clarke	Ted Freyer (50)
1932	Garnet Campbell	Garnet Campbell	Syd Carman	Ted Freyer (52)
1933	Garnet Campbell	Garnet Campbell	Paddy Walsh	Ted Freyer (51)
1934	Charlie May	Keith Forbes	Dick Reynolds *	Ted Freyer (61)
1935	Charlie May	Keith Forbes	Keith Forbes	Keith Forbes (52)
1936	Jack Baggott	Jack Baggott	Dick Reynolds	Ted Freyer (50)
1937	Jack Baggott	Jack Baggott / Keith Forbes	Dick Reynolds *	Keith Forbes (44)
1938	Jack Baggott	Len Webster	Dick Reynolds *	Tom Reynolds (68)
1939	Jack Baggott / Harry Hunter / Dick Reynolds	Dick Reynolds	Dick Reynolds	Tom Reynolds (71)
1940	Dick Reynolds	Dick Reynolds	Hugh Torney	Ted Bryce (48)
1941	Dick Reynolds	Dick Reynolds	Wally Buttsworth	Tom Reynolds (65)
1942 #	Dick Reynolds	Dick Reynolds	Dick Reynolds	Tom Reynolds (61)
1943	Dick Reynolds	Dick Reynolds	Dick Reynolds	Dick Reynolds (31)
1944	Dick Reynolds	Dick Reynolds	Percy Bushby	Ray Powell (42)
1945	Dick Reynolds	Dick Reynolds	Wally Buttsworth	Bill Brittingham (48)
1946 #	Dick Reynolds	Dick Reynolds	Bill Hutchison	Bill Brittingham (66)
1947	Dick Reynolds	Dick Reynolds	Wally Buttsworth	Ted Leehane (50)
1948	Dick Reynolds	Dick Reynolds	Bill Hutchison	Bill Hutchison (52)
1949 #	Dick Reynolds	Dick Reynolds	John Coleman	John Coleman (100)
1950 #	Dick Reynolds	Dick Reynolds	Bill Hutchison	John Coleman (120)
1951	Dick Reynolds	Bill Hutchison	Norm McDonald	John Coleman (75)
1952	Dick Reynolds	Bill Hutchison	Bill Hutchison *	John Coleman (103)
1953	Dick Reynolds	Bill Hutchison	Bill Hutchison *	John Coleman (97)
1954	Dick Reynolds	Bill Hutchison	John Gill	John Coleman (42)
1955	Dick Reynolds	Bill Hutchison	Bill Hutchison	Hugh Mitchell (51)
1956	Dick Reynolds	Bill Hutchison	Bill Hutchison	Graham Willey (33)
1957	Dick Reynolds	Bill Hutchison	Reg Burgess	Fred Gallagher (34)
1958	Dick Reynolds	Jack Clarke	Jack Clarke	John Birt (31)
1958	Dick Reynolds	Jack Clarke	Jack Clarke	John Birt (31)
1959	Dick Reynolds	Jack Clarke	Hugh Mitchell	Ron Evans (78
1960	Dick Reynolds	Jack Clarke	Reg Burgess	Ron Evans (67)
1961	John Coleman	Jack Clarke	John Birt	Hugh Mitchell (33)
1962 #	John Coleman	Jack Clarke	Jack Clarke	Charlie Payne (39)
1963	John Coleman	Jack Clarke	Ken Fraser	Charlie Payne (36)
1964	John Coleman	Jack Clarke	Ken Fraser	Hugh Mitchell (32)
1965 #	John Coleman	Ken Fraser	John Birt	Ted Fordham (54)
1966	John Coleman	Ken Fraser	Don McKenzie	Ted Fordham (76)
1967	John Coleman	Ken Fraser	John Birt	Alan Noonan (40)
1968	Jack Clarke	Ken Fraser	Barry Davis	Alan Noonan (51)
1969	Jack Clarke	Don McKenzie	Barry Davis	Alan Noonan (43)
1970	Jack Clarke	Barry Davis	Darryl Gerlach	Geoff Blethyn (33)
1971	John Birt	Barry Davis	Barry Davis	Alan Noonan (31)
1972	Des Tuddenham	Des Tuddenham	Neville Fields	Geoff Blethyn (107)
1973	Des Tuddenham	Des Tuddenham	Andy Wilson	Alan Noonan (63)
1974	Des Tuddenham	Des Tuddenham	Graham Moss	Alan Noonan (77)
1975	Des Tuddenham	Des Tuddenham	Graham Moss	Alan Noonan (48)
1976	Bill Stephen	Graham Moss	Graham Moss *	Geoff Blethyn (39)
1977	Bill Stephen	Ken Fletcher	Simon Madden	Max Crow (38)
1978	Barry Davis	Ken Fletcher	Ken Fletcher	Wayne Primmer (47)
1979	Barry Davis	Ken Fletcher	Simon Madden	Terry Daniher (57)
1979	Barry Davis	Ken Fletcher	Simon Madden	Terry Daniher (57)
1980	Barry Davis	Simon Madden	Tim Watson	Simon Madden (45)
1981	Kevin Sheedy	Simon Madden	Neale Daniher	Tony Buhagiar (42)
1982	Kevin Sheedy	Neale Daniher	Terry Daniher	Simon Madden (49)
1983	Kevin Sheedy	Terry Daniher	Simon Madden	Terry Daniher (64)
1984 #	Kevin Sheedy	Terry Daniher	Simon Madden	Paul Salmon (63)
1985 #	Kevin Sheedy	Terry Daniher	Tim Watson	Mark Harvey (48)
1986	Kevin Sheedy	Terry Daniher	Glenn Hawker	Alan Ezard (47)
1987	Kevin Sheedy	Terry Daniher	Mark Thompson	Paul Salmon (43)
1988	Kevin Sheedy	Terry Daniher	Tim Watson	Paul Salmon (37)
1989	Kevin Sheedy	Tim Watson	Tim Watson	Paul Salmon (39)
1990	Kevin Sheedy	Tim Watson	Mark Thompson	Paul Salmon (43)
1991	Kevin Sheedy	Tim Watson	Alan Ezard	Simon Madden (42)
1992	Kevin Sheedy	Mark Thompson	Mark Harvey	Paul Salmon (59)
1993 #	Kevin Sheedy	Mark Thompson	Gary O'Donnell (Note: Essendon player Gavin Wanganeen was awarded the Brownlow Medal.)	Paul Salmon (65)
1994	Kevin Sheedy	Mark Thompson	James Hird	Scott Cummings (32)
1995	Kevin Sheedy	Mark Thompson	James Hird	James Hird (47)
1996	Kevin Sheedy	Gary O'Donnell	James Hird *	James Hird (39)
1997	Kevin Sheedy	Gary O'Donnell	Sean Denham	Matthew Lloyd (63)
1998	Kevin Sheedy	James Hird	Damien Hardwick	Matthew Lloyd (70)
1999	Kevin Sheedy	James Hird / Michael Long	Mark Mercuri	Matthew Lloyd (87)
2000 #	Kevin Sheedy	James Hird	Dustin Fletcher	Matthew Lloyd (109)
2001	Kevin Sheedy	James Hird	Jason Johnson	Matthew Lloyd (105)
2002	Kevin Sheedy	James Hird	Mark Johnson	Matthew Lloyd (47)
2003	Kevin Sheedy	James Hird	James Hird / Scott Lucas	Matthew Lloyd (93)
2004	Kevin Sheedy	James Hird	Adam McPhee	Matthew Lloyd (96)
2005	Kevin Sheedy	James Hird	Jason Johnson	Matthew Lloyd (59)
2006	Kevin Sheedy	Matthew Lloyd	Scott Lucas	Scott Lucas (67)
2007	Kevin Sheedy	Matthew Lloyd	James Hird	Matthew Lloyd (62)
2008	Matthew Knights	Matthew Lloyd	David Hille	Matthew Lloyd (62)
2009	Matthew Knights	Matthew Lloyd	Jobe Watson	Matthew Lloyd (35)
2010	Matthew Knights	Jobe Watson	Jobe Watson	Angus Monfries (24)
2011	James Hird	Jobe Watson	David Zaharakis	Stewart Crameri (34)
2012	James Hird	Jobe Watson	Jobe Watson	Stewart Crameri (32)
2013	James Hird	Jobe Watson	Brendon Goddard	Stewart Crameri (30)
2014	Mark Thompson	Jobe Watson	Dyson Heppell	Joe Daniher (28)
2015	James Hird / Matthew Egan	Jobe Watson	Cale Hooker	Joe Daniher (34)
2016	John Worsfold	Brendon Goddard	Zach Merrett	Joe Daniher (43)
2017	John Worsfold	Dyson Heppell	Joe Daniher	Joe Daniher (65)
2018	John Worsfold	Dyson Heppell	Devon Smith	Jake Stringer (30)
2019	John Worsfold	Dyson Heppell	Zach Merrett	Jake Stringer (33)
2020	John Worsfold	Dyson Heppell	Jordan Ridley	Anthony McDonald-Tipungwuti (19)
2021	Ben Rutten	Dyson Heppell	Zach Merrett	Jake Stringer (41)
2022	Ben Rutten	Dyson Heppell	Peter Wright	Peter Wright (53)
2023	Brad Scott	Zach Merrett	Zach Merrett	Kyle Langford (51)
2024	Brad Scott	Zach Merrett	Zach Merrett	Kyle Langford (43)
2025	Brad Scott	Zach Merrett	(TBA)	(TBA)
Source: Essendon Football Club. Last updated: 9 March 2025.
