= List of Essendon Football Club leading goalkickers =

The following list details all of the major goalkicking records relating specifically to Essendon Football Club, including season highs, career highs, and game highs for both the Australian Football League (formerly the Victorian Football League) and AFL Women's, as well as the club's pre-VFL/AFL records. The AFL's annual leading goalkicker award, the Coleman Medal, is named after Essendon's John Coleman. At the 2009 Essendon Best & Fairest awards night, outgoing CEO Peter Jackson announced that the Essendon leading goalkicker medal would be named the Matthew Lloyd Medal in honour of the recently retired Matthew Lloyd. This is sometimes referred to as the Matthew Lloyd Leading Goalkicker Award.

== Leading goalkickers by season ==
The following is a list of Essendon leading goalkickers in each season.

=== Pre-VFA era ===
| Season | Player(s) | Goals |
|---|---|---|
| 1873 | [data missing] | |
| 1874 | James Robertson | 4 |
| 1875 | [data missing] | |
| 1876 | W. Martin | 5 |
| 1876 | George Miller | 5 |

=== VFA era ===
| Season | Player(s) | Goals |
|---|---|---|
| 1877 | Bob Amess | 3 |
| 1878 | M. O'Meara | 7 |
| 1879 | Alf Goding | 7 |
| 1880 | Tom Bloomfield | 7 |
| 1881 | J. M. Carter | 4 |
| 1881 | A. Crow | 4 |
| 1882 | G. Cairns | 13 |
| 1883 | Wilfred Kent-Hughes | 14 |
| 1884 | H. C. Caldwell | 13 |
| 1885 | Phil McShane | 18 |
| 1886 | H. C. Caldwell (2) | 11 |
| 1887 | H. C. Caldwell (3) | 11 |
| 1888 | Alf Carter | 9 |
| 1888 | Finlay | 9 |
| 1889 | Alf Carter (2) | 15 |
| 1890 | Fergusson | 14 |
| 1891 | W. Christian | 20 |
| 1892 | Albert Thurgood | 56 |
| 1893 | Albert Thurgood (2) | 63 |
| 1894 | Albert Thurgood (3) | 62 |
| 1895 | Alec Hall | 9 |
| 1895 | Norman Waugh | 9 |
| 1896 | Norman Waugh (2) | 29 |

=== VFL/AFL era ===
| ✪ | Player won Coleman Medal (or equivalent) |
| † | Team played finals (which count for the tally) |
**Bold text** indicates player currently plays in AFL or AFLW

| Season | Player(s) | Goals |
|---|---|---|
| 1897 | Norman Waugh (3) | 23† |
| 1898 | Charlie Moore | 20† |
| 1899 | Arthur Cleghorn | 15 |
| 1900 | Albert Thurgood ✪ (4) | 25† |
| 1901 | Fred Hiskins ✪ | 34† |
| 1902 | Albert Thurgood (5) | 32† |
| 1903 | Mick Madden | 15 |
| 1904 | Mick Madden (2) | 25† |
| 1905 | George Barker | 29† |
| 1906 | Norman Yeo | 31† |
| 1907 | Jim Martin | 16 |
| 1908 | David Smith | 26† |
| 1909 | Paddy Shea | 40† |
| 1910 | Bert Armstrong | 30† |
| 1911 | Lou Armstrong | 35† |
| 1912 | Jack Kirby | 43† |
| 1913 | Jack Kirby (2) | 29 |
| 1914 | Ernie Lumsden | 28 |
| 1915 | Bill Walker | 14 |
| 1916 | Did not compete due to WWI | — |
| 1917 | Did not compete due to WWI | — |
| 1918 | Norm Hall | 15 |
| 1919 | Dave Walsh | 15 |
| 1920 | Frank McDonald | 33 |
| 1921 | Frank McDonald (2) | 17 |
| 1922 | Jack Moriarty | 36† |
| 1923 | Greg Stockdale ✪ | 68† |
| 1924 | Tommy Jenkins | 50† |
| 1925 | Tommy Jenkins (2) | 37† |
| 1926 | Greg Stockdale (2) | 36† |
| 1927 | Jack Vosti | 35 |
| 1928 | Greg Stockdale (3) | 39 |
| 1929 | Keith Forbes | 40 |
| 1929 | Len Johnson | 40 |
| 1930 | Keith Forbes (2) | 54 |
| 1931 | Ted Freyer | 50 |
| 1932 | Ted Freyer (2) | 52 |
| 1933 | Ted Freyer (3) | 51 |
| 1934 | Ted Freyer (4) | 61 |
| 1935 | Keith Forbes (3) | 52 |
| 1936 | Ted Freyer (5) | 50 |
| 1937 | Keith Forbes (4) | 44 |
| 1938 | Tom Reynolds | 68 |
| 1939 | Tom Reynolds (2) | 71 |
| 1940 | Ted Bryce | 48† |
| 1941 | Tom Reynolds (3) | 65† |
| 1942 | Tom Reynolds (4) | 61† |
| 1943 | Dick Reynolds | 31† |
| 1944 | Ray Powell | 42† |
| 1945 | Bill Brittingham | 48 |
| 1946 | Bill Brittingham (2) | 66† |
| 1947 | Ted Leehane | 50† |
| 1948 | Bill Hutchison | 52† |
| 1949 | John Coleman ✪ | 100† |
| 1950 | John Coleman ✪ (2) | 120† |
| 1951 | John Coleman ✪ (3) | 75† |
| 1952 | John Coleman ✪ (4) | 103 |
| 1953 | John Coleman ✪ (5) | 97† |
| 1954 | John Coleman (6) | 42 |
| 1955 | Hugh Mitchell | 51† |
| 1956 | Graham Willey | 33 |
| 1957 | Fred Gallagher | 34† |
| 1958 | John Birt | 31 |
| 1959 | Ron Evans ✪ | 78† |
| 1960 | Ron Evans ✪ (2) | 67† |
| 1961 | Hugh Mitchell (2) | 33 |
| 1962 | Charlie Payne | 39† |
| 1963 | Charlie Payne (2) | 36 |
| 1964 | Hugh Mitchell (3) | 32† |
| 1965 | Ted Fordham | 54† |
| 1966 | Ted Fordham ✪ (2) | 76† |
| 1967 | Alan Noonan | 40 |
| 1968 | Alan Noonan (2) | 51† |
| 1969 | Alan Noonan (3) | 43 |
| 1970 | Geoff Blethyn | 33 |
| 1971 | Alan Noonan (4) | 31 |
| 1972 | Geoff Blethyn (2) | 107† |
| 1973 | Alan Noonan (5) | 63† |
| 1974 | Alan Noonan (6) | 77 |
| 1975 | Alan Noonan (7) | 48 |
| 1976 | Geoff Blethyn (2) | 39 |
| 1977 | Max Crow | 38 |
| 1978 | Wayne Primmer | 47 |
| 1979 | Terry Daniher | 57† |
| 1980 | Simon Madden | 45 |
| 1981 | Tony Buhagiar | 42† |
| 1982 | Simon Madden (2) | 49† |
| 1983 | Terry Daniher (2) | 64† |
| 1984 | Paul Salmon | 63† |
| 1985 | Mark Harvey | 48† |
| 1986 | Alan Ezard | 47† |
| 1987 | Paul Salmon (2) | 43 |
| 1988 | Paul Salmon (3) | 37 |
| 1989 | Paul Salmon (4) | 39† |
| 1990 | Paul Salmon (5) | 43† |
| 1991 | Simon Madden (3) | 42† |
| 1992 | Paul Salmon (6) | 59 |
| 1993 | Paul Salmon (7) | 65† |
| 1994 | Scott Cummings | 32 |
| 1995 | James Hird | 47† |
| 1996 | James Hird (2) | 39† |
| 1997 | Matthew Lloyd | 63 |
| 1998 | Matthew Lloyd (2) | 70† |
| 1999 | Matthew Lloyd (3) | 87† |
| 2000 | Matthew Lloyd ✪ (4) | 109† |
| 2001 | Matthew Lloyd ✪ (5) | 105† |
| 2002 | Matthew Lloyd (6) | 47† |
| 2003 | Matthew Lloyd ✪ (7) | 93† |
| 2004 | Matthew Lloyd (8) | 96† |
| 2005 | Matthew Lloyd (9) | 59 |
| 2006 | Scott Lucas | 67 |
| 2007 | Matthew Lloyd (10) | 62 |
| 2008 | Matthew Lloyd (11) | 62 |
| 2009 | Matthew Lloyd (12) | 35† |
| 2010 | Angus Monfries | 24 |
| 2011 | Stewart Crameri | 34† |
| 2012 | Stewart Crameri (2) | 32 |
| 2013 | Stewart Crameri (3) | 30 |
| 2014 | Joe Daniher | 28† |
| 2015 | Joe Daniher (2) | 34 |
| 2016 | Joe Daniher (3) | 43 |
| 2017 | Joe Daniher (4) | 65† |
| 2018 | **Jake Stringer** | 30 |
| 2019 | **Jake Stringer (2)** | 33† |
| 2020 | Anthony McDonald-Tipungwuti | 19 |
| 2021 | **Jake Stringer (3)** | 41† |
| 2022 | **Peter Wright** | 53 |
| 2023 | **Kyle Langford** | 51 |
| 2024 | **Kyle Langford (2)** | 43 |
| 2025 | **Peter Wright (2)** | 28 |
| 2026 | **Nate Caddy** | 46 |

== Multiple leading goalkickers ==
Multiple leading goalkickers (5 minimum)
| 12 | Matthew Lloyd |
| 7 | Alan Noonan |
| 7 | Paul Salmon |
| 6 | John Coleman |
| 5 | Ted Freyer |

== Leading career goalkickers for Essendon ==
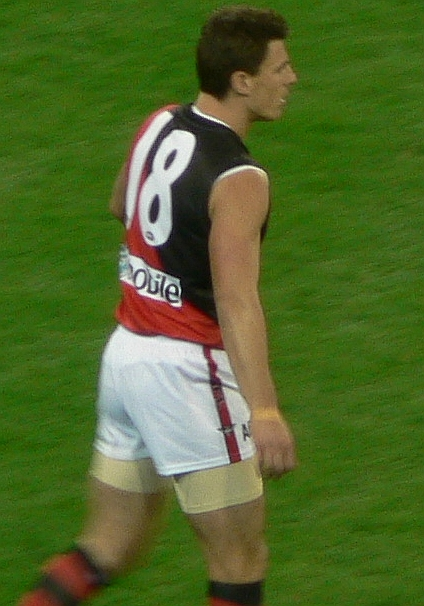
Matthew Lloyd is the club's career leading goalkicker. In addition to being the club's leading goalkicker a record 12 times, Lloyd has 926 career goals, also a club record.

| | Player | Games | Goals | Average | Seasons |
|---|---|---|---|---|---|
| 1 | Matthew Lloyd | 270 | 926 | 3.43 | 1995–2009 |
| 2 | Simon Madden | 378 | 575 | 1.52 | 1974–1992 |
| 3 | John Coleman | 98 | 537 | 5.48 | 1949–1954 |
| 4 | Paul Salmon | 224 | 520 | 2.32 | 1983–2002 |
| 5 | Bill Hutchison | 290 | 496 | 1.71 | 1942–1957 |
| 6 | Scott Lucas | 270 | 471 | 1.74 | 1996–2009 |
| 7 | Terry Daniher | 294 | 447 | 1.52 | 1978–1992 |
| 8 | Dick Reynolds | 320 | 442 | 1.38 | 1933–1951 |
| 9 | Alan Noonan | 182 | 420 | 2.31 | 1966–1976 |
| 10 | Keith Forbes | 152 | 415 | 2.73 | 1928–1937 |
| 11 | Ted Freyer | 124 | 372 | 3 | 1929–1937 |
| 12 | Tom Reynolds | 109 | 361 | 3.31 | 1937–1944 |
| 13 | James Hird | 253 | 343 | 1.36 | 1992–2007 |
| 14 | Tim Watson | 307 | 335 | 1.09 | 1977–1994 |
| 15 | Darren Bewick | 238 | 332 | 1.39 | 1988–2000 |
| 16 | John Birt | 193 | 303 | 1.57 | 1957–1967 |
| 17 | Hugh Mitchell | 224 | 301 | 1.34 | 1953–1967 |
| 18 | Paul Vander Haar | 201 | 278 | 1.38 | 1977–1990 |
| 19 | Gordon Lane | 131 | 256 | 1.95 | 1940–1949 |
| 20 | Mark Mercuri | 207 | 242 | 1.17 | 1992–2004 |

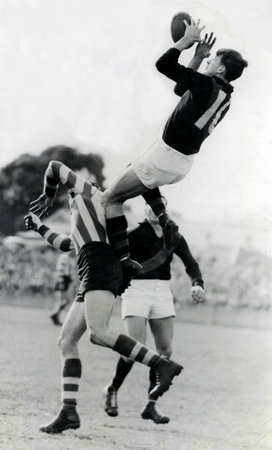
Coleman, seen here taking a spectacular mark over North Melbourne's full-back Vic Lawrence in 1953, retired with a record average of 5.48 goals per game (subsequently only beaten by Hawthorn's Peter Hudson), and his 14 goals in a single game remains a club record.

== Most goals in a game ==
| Goals | Player | Opponent | Round | Year | Venue |
|---|---|---|---|---|---|
| 14 | John Coleman | Fitzroy | R7 | 1954 | Windy Hill |
| 13 | Matthew Lloyd | Sydney | R3 | 1999 | M.C.G. |
| 13 | John Coleman | Geelong | R8 | 1952 | Brisbane Exhibition Ground |
| 13 | John Coleman | Hawthorn | R18 | 1952 | Windy Hill |
| 12 | Fred Gallagher | Geelong | R8 | 1957 | Windy Hill |
| 12 | John Coleman | Hawthorn | R1 | 1949 | Windy Hill |
| 12 | Ted Freyer | Melbourne | R1 | 1935 | M.C.G. |
| 11 | Matthew Lloyd | Western Bulldogs | R19 | 2003 | Docklands |
| 11 | Paul Salmon | West Coast | R15 | 1987 | W.A.C.A. |
| 11 | Paul Salmon | Richmond | R19 | 1986 | VFL Park |
| 11 | Geoff Blethyn | Footscray | R12 | 1972 | Windy Hill |
| 11 | John Coleman | South Melbourne | R2 | 1953 | Lake Oval |
| 11 | John Coleman | South Melbourne | R2 | 1950 | Windy Hill |

== AFL Women's ==
=== Leading goalkickers by season ===
| Season | Player(s) | Goals |
|---|---|---|
| 2022 (S7) | Daria Bannister | 8 |
| 2023 | Bonnie Toogood | 16† |
| 2024 | Daria Bannister | 10† |
| 2025 | Sophie Alexander | 8 |

== See also ==
- Coleman Medal
- VFL/AFL goalkicking records
- List of Essendon Football Club honours
- Essendon Football Club#Honours

== Sources ==
- Essendon Club Honours
- ESSENDON - MOST GOALS
- ESSENDON - MOST GOALS IN A MATCH
- https://afltables.com/afl/teams/essendon/leadinggk.html
- https://afltables.com/afl/stats/alltime/leadinggk.html
