= List of Essendon Football Club captains =

The following is a list of players who have captained the Essendon Football Club in the Victorian Football League/Australian Football League (VFL/AFL) and AFL Women's (AFLW).

== VFL/AFL ==
Seasons	Captain	Notes
1897–1900	George Stuckey	1897 premiership captain
1901–1902	Tod Collins	1901 premiership captain
1903–1904	Jim Anderson	
1904	Hugh Gavin (stand-in)	
1905	William Robinson	
1906	Jack McKenzie	
1907–1909	William Griffith	
1910	Allan Belcher	
1911	David Smith	1911 premiership captain
1912–1915	Allan Belcher	1912 premiership captain
1918	Fred Baring	
1919	Allan Belcher	
1920–1921	Percy Ogden	
1922–1924	Syd Barker	1923 and 1924 premiership captain
1925–1928	Frank Maher	
1929–1930	Norm Beckton	
1931–1933	Garnet Campbell	
1934–1935	Keith Forbes	
1936–1937	Jack Baggott	
1937	Keith Forbes (stand-in)	
1938	Len Webster	
1939–1950	Dick Reynolds	1942, 1946, 1949 and 1950 premiership captain
1951–1957	Bill Hutchison	
1958–1964	Jack Clarke	1962 premiership captain
1965–1968	Ken Fraser	1965 premiership captain
1969	Don McKenzie	
1970–1971	Barry Davis	
1972–1975	Des Tuddenham	
1976	Graham Moss	
1977–1979	Ken Fletcher	
1980–1981	Simon Madden	
1982	Neale Daniher	
1982	Ron Andrews (stand-in)	
1983–1988	Terry Daniher	1984 and 1985 premiership captain
1989–1991	Tim Watson	
1992–1995	Mark Thompson	1993 premiership captain
1996–1997	Gary O'Donnell	
1998–2005	James Hird	2000 premiership captain
2006–2009	Matthew Lloyd	
2010–2016	Jobe Watson	
2016	Brendon Goddard	
2017–2022	Dyson Heppell	
2023–2025	Zach Merrett	
2026–	Andrew McGrath	

== AFL Women's ==
Seasons	Captain(s)
2022 (S7)–2025	Steph Cain/Bonnie Toogood
2026–	Bonnie Toogood

== Sources ==
- Essendon Football Club – club honours
