= Norman Yeo =

Australian rules footballer

Personal information
- Full name: Norman Wyatt Yeo
- Born: 21 June 1886; Ballarat East, Victoria
- Died: 1 June 1950 (aged 63); Malvern East, Victoria
- Original team: Wesley College

Playing career^{1}
Years	Club	Games (Goals)
1906	Essendon	15 (31)
1909	University	2 (2)
Total		17 (33)
- ^{1} Playing statistics correct to the end of 1909.

Norman Wyatt Yeo (21 June 1886 – 1 June 1950) was an Australian rules footballer who played with Essendon and University in the Victorian Football League.

== Family ==
The son of Rev. Henry Yeo, and Sarah Ann Yeo, née Allan, Norman Wyatt Yeo was born at Ballarat East on 21 June 1886.

He married Eva Agnes Thompson on 29 October 1914.

== Education ==
He was educated at Wesley College, Melbourne, where he was a member of their first XVIII football team.

== Football ==
=== Essendon (VFL) ===
Yeo was the leading goalkicker for Essendon in his only season with the club, scoring 31 goals in his 15 games. According to Maplestone (1996), "Yeo had business commitments that kept him out of football [in 1907]" (p.69).

=== VFL Representative team ===
Yeo was selected in the VFL side to play against a combined Ballarat team, in Ballarat, on Saturday, 11 August 1906. It was a "return" match, the first having been played in Melbourne, on the MCG, on 23 June 1906.

Given that Melbourne, St Kilda, Carlton, and Fitzroy were playing against each other in the second half of the split round 13, selection was made from the remaining four VFL teams — although, because the entire Collingwood team were touring Tasmania (and no Collingwood players were available for selection) the team was restricted to players from Essendon, Geelong, and South Melbourne — and Yeo was one of the six Essendon players selected: Allan Belcher, Ernie Cameron, Mick Madden, Jack McKenzie, Bill Sewart, and Norman Yeo.

The combined Ballarat team outclassed the VFL side, eventually winning the match 11.7 (73) to 6.7 (43); and, although selected at full-forward, Yeo failed to score a goal.

=== Beverley (MJFA) ===
He subsequently played for Beverley in the Metropolitan Amateur Football Association (MAFA(, captaining the side in 1908. (Note: Some sources including the Encyclopedia of AFL Footballers state that Yeo played in the Victorian Football Association for both Richmond and Hawthorn, however club records do not show him ever playing for these teams. Yeo had retired by 1914, the year that Hawthorn were first admitted to the VFA) He retired at the end of the 1913 season, playing his final game for Beverley in a semi-final loss to Leopold.

=== University (VFL) ===
In 1909, Yeo again returned to senior football ranks, this time playing two games for University in the Victorian Football League.

=== Beverley (MJFA) ===
Yeo returned to the Beverley Football Club, and he captained them until he retired at the end of the 1913 season.

== Later life ==
After his football career, Yeo was a leading figure in the Australian wool industry, being the chief accountant of the Central Wool Committee during World War I and the British Australian Wool Realization Commission which was set up to deal with the disposal of wool stocks when the war ended. He also helped the Government in its operation of the Central Wool Committee during World War II.

== Death ==
Norman Wyatt Yeo died at his home in East Malvern on 1 June 1950.
