= James Swanton Waugh =

James Swanton Waugh (22 March 1822 – 6 November 1898) was a Methodist minister, president of the Methodist conference in Victoria, Australia and the first president of Wesley College, Melbourne serving for 18 years.

== Early life and education ==
Waugh was born in County Wexford, Ireland, the son of Rev. John Waugh, a Wesleyan minister. He was educated at the Royal School, Dungannon. Initially studying medicine at Trinity College, Dublin, Waugh entered the Wesleyan ministry in 1840.

== Ministry ==
After 13 years in Dublin circuits, he volunteered to serve on the Victorian goldfields, arriving in Melbourne on 8 February 1854.

Waugh played a pivotal role in Australian Methodism, serving as president of both the Wesleyan Conference of Victoria and the Australasian Conference. He was the founding president of Wesley College (1866–1884), shaping it into a leading institution. Minister Henry Howard was one of his students.

Honoured with a Doctor of Divinity in 1879, he trained over 30 ministers and contributed significantly to education and faith in Victoria.

== Personal life ==
Waugh married Olivia Fayle in 1857; the couple had a large family. Waugh died on 6 November 1898, survived by his children, including sons Ernest W. Waugh, mayor of North Perth and Norman J. Waugh, former Australian rules footballer.
