= Kyle Langford (footballer) =

Australian rules footballer

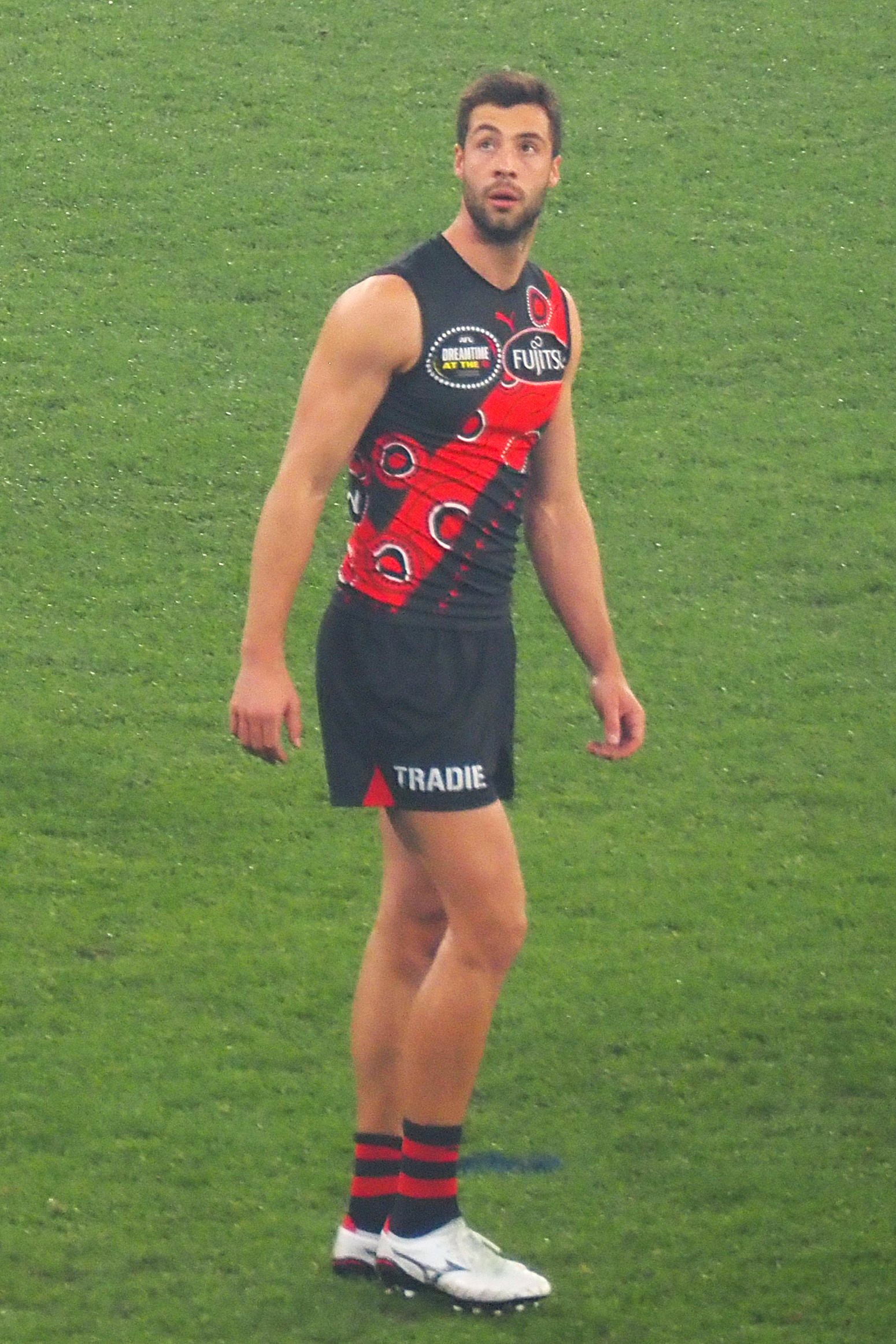
- Langford playing for Essendon in 2025

Personal information
- Full name: Kyle Langford
- Born: 1 December 1996 (age 29)
- Original team: Northern Knights (TAC Cup) / Macleod
- Draft: No. 17, 2014 national draft
- Height: 192 cm (6 ft 4 in)
- Weight: 88 kg (194 lb)
- Position: Midfielder / Forward

Club information
- Current club: Essendon
- Number: 4

Playing career^{1}
Years	Club	Games (Goals)
2015–	Essendon	179 (183)
- ^{1} Playing statistics correct to the end of round 22, 2026: 2× Essendon leading goalkicker: 2023, 2024; Essendon Best Clubman: 2020, 2021; 2nd B&F: 2023; All-Australian squad: 2023.

Kyle Langford (born 1 December 1996) is a professional Australian rules footballer with the Essendon Football Club in the Australian Football League (AFL).

== Early life ==
Langford attended Ivanhoe Grammar School and represented both the Northern Knights and Vic Metro in the TAC Cup and AFL Under 18 Championships, respectively. He kicked back-to-back five-goal hauls and equalled the highest marking average of eight marks per match in the TAC Cup. In his younger years, he played local football for Macleod in the Yarra Junior Football League.

== AFL career ==
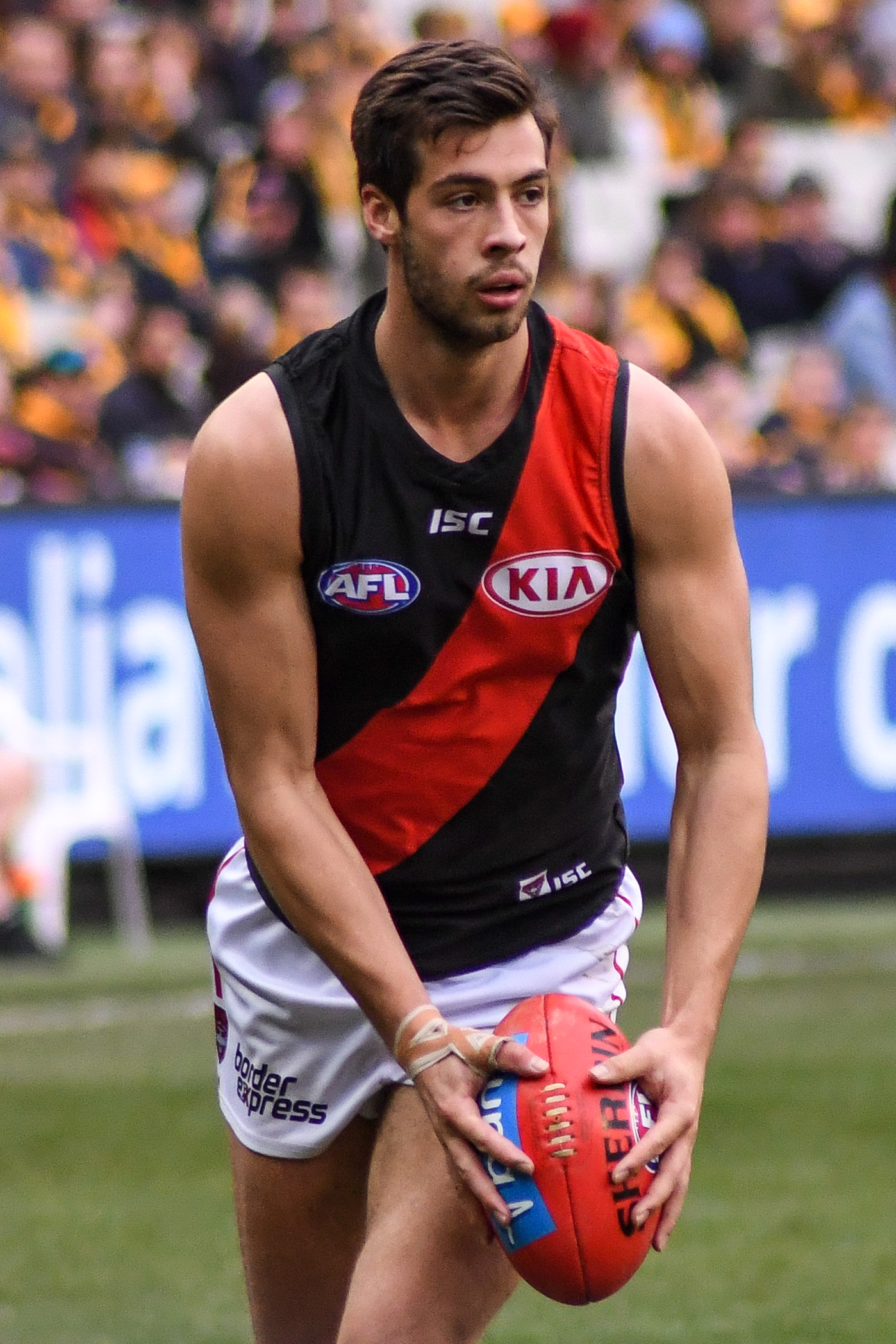
Langford playing for Essendon in 2018

Langford was recruited by the Essendon Football Club with the 17th overall selection in the 2014 national draft. He made his AFL debut against St Kilda in round 5, 2015.

He played 17 games in the 2016 AFL season, spending most of his time in the midfield and across the half-forward line. Langford booted 12 goals for the season (fourth overall at the club), including three in the Bombers' win over Carlton in round 23.

In the 2017 season, Langford managed only six senior appearances, spending most of the year developing his midfield craft in the Victorian Football League (VFL). Playing as a full-time inside midfielder at VFL level, he impressed coaching staff by gathering high disposal and clearance numbers, laying the structural groundwork for his transition away from being a pure forward.

Langford received the No. 4 guernsey for the 2018 AFL season, previously held by club champion Jobe Watson. He took the next step in his development, showing plenty of skill and composure while playing in his new midfield role, and was also able to rest forward and contribute on the scoreboard.

In the 2019 home-and-away season, Langford played 17 of 22 games in a forward/midfield role.

The 2020 season was Langford's most consistent campaign to date. He played 16 of a possible 17 games, finished fourth in the club's best and fairest and third in the club's goalkicking.

Langford continued his upward trajectory during the 2021 season, averaging a career-high 20.8 disposals per game across 17 appearances and finishing seventh in the club's best and fairest. He was named Essendon's Best Clubman for the second consecutive year, recognising his leadership and positive impact on the playing group. However, a hamstring strain suffered in round 20 against Sydney sidelined him for the remainder of the year, forcing him to miss the Bombers' elimination final against the Western Bulldogs.

In the 2022 season, Langford's campaign was heavily curtailed by a severe right hamstring injury suffered during round 1 against Geelong. Following an ultra-conservative rehabilitation, he returned to the senior side in the second half of the year, finishing with ten goals from nine appearances, highlighted by a four-goal performance against Brisbane in round 17.

A 51-goal season in 2023 saw Langford win Essendon's leading goalkicker award and gain inclusion in the 44-man All-Australian squad; however, he missed selection in the final 22.

In 2024, Langford led Essendon's goalkicking for the second successive season, booting 43 goals.

In the 2025 season, recurring soft-tissue injuries restricted Langford to nine games and eight goals. He suffered a hamstring strain early in the year and a quad strain over the mid-season bye, which recurred in round 19 against Melbourne. Following the season, he travelled to Aspetar in Qatar to undergo specialised assessment and rehabilitation on his hamstring and quad.

During round 20 of the 2026 season against Greater Western Sydney, Langford was commended for a selfless last-minute play that helped seal a three-point victory. The win broke Essendon's 12-match losing streak and marked their first victory in Victoria in 14 months. While taking a late set shot, Langford opted to soak up the clock and deliberately kicked a wide pass to a contest rather than risking a behind. His tactical awareness prevented Greater Western Sydney from potentially rebounding to score a match-winning goal, avoiding a repeat of Essendon's heartbreaking round 22 loss to Gold Coast in August 2024, where missed shots from Jake Stringer and Sam Draper late in a wasteful 1.9 final quarter allowed the Suns to transition coast-to-coast for a match-winning goal after the siren by Mac Andrew.

== Statistics ==
Updated to the end of round 22, 2026.

Legend
G	Goals	K	Kicks	D	Disposals	T	Tackles
B	Behinds	H	Handballs	M	Marks

Season	Team	No.	Games	Totals							Averages (per game)							Votes
Season	Team	No.	Games	G	B	K	H	D	M	T	G	B	K	H	D	M	T	Votes
2015	Essendon	30	8	3	3	27	37	64	15	19	0.4	0.4	3.4	4.6	8.0	1.9	2.4	0
2016	Essendon	30	17	12	7	134	126	260	81	58	0.7	0.4	7.9	7.4	15.3	4.8	3.4	0
2017	Essendon	30	6	4	4	47	35	82	26	19	0.7	0.7	7.8	5.8	13.7	4.3	3.2	0
2018	Essendon	4	16	9	8	168	120	288	64	78	0.6	0.5	10.5	7.5	18.0	4.0	4.9	1
2019	Essendon	4	18	15	3	162	152	314	64	56	0.8	0.2	9.0	8.4	17.4	3.6	3.1	0
2020 (Note: The 2020 season was played with 17 home-and-away matches per team (down from 22) and 16-minute quarters with time on (down from 20-minute quarters with time on) due to the impact of the COVID-19 pandemic.)	Essendon	4	16	11	9	145	142	287	65	30	0.7	0.6	9.1	8.9	17.9	4.1	1.9	0
2021	Essendon	4	17	13	3	202	152	354	98	57	0.8	0.2	11.9	8.9	20.8	5.8	3.4	0
2022	Essendon	4	9	10	7	73	51	124	42	22	1.1	0.8	8.1	5.7	13.8	4.7	2.4	0
2023	Essendon	4	23	51	23	218	96	314	130	36	2.2	1.0	9.5	4.2	13.7	5.7	1.6	3
2024	Essendon	4	23	43	27	193	96	289	119	59	1.9	1.2	8.4	4.2	12.6	5.2	2.6	6
2025	Essendon	4	9	8	1	60	40	100	28	18	0.9	0.1	6.7	4.4	11.1	3.1	2.0	0
2026	Essendon	4	17	4	9	160	114	274	88	34	0.2	0.5	9.4	6.7	16.1	5.2	2.0	0
Career			179	183	104	1589	1161	2750	820	486	1.0	0.6	8.9	6.5	15.4	4.6	2.7	10
