= Bill Freyer =

Australian rules footballer, born 1900

Personal information
- Full name: William Alan Kelso Freyer
- Born: 11 March 1900; Port Melbourne, Victoria
- Died: 4 December 1961 (aged 61); South Melbourne, Victoria
- Height: 179 cm (5 ft 10 in)
- Weight: 78 kg (172 lb)
- Position: Defender

Playing career^{1}
Years	Club	Games (Goals)
1925	South Melbourne	12 (0)
1926	Footscray	7 (0)
Total		19 (0)
- ^{1} Playing statistics correct to the end of 1926.

William Alan Kelso Freyer (11 March 1900 – 4 December 1961) was an Australian rules footballer who played with South Melbourne and Footscray in the Victorian Football League (VFL). He generally played as a defender.

Before his VFL career, Freyer played for the Port Melbourne Juniors, winning an award for most consistent player. Having been on South Melbourne's junior reserve list in 1924, he attended try-outs for their senior side in April 1925, ending up among six players out of 100 hopefuls to make the senior list.

Freyer made his VFL debut in the opening round of the 1925 season against Carlton, a victory for South. Round 2, against Footscray, saw him assigned to mark George Bayliss – what The Record called "a hard task for any man". Freyer's performance won praise from the football columnists, with his judgement, positioning and speed singled out, though he did concede a goal through an illegal handpass. The Sporting Globe considered him likely to hold a permanent spot in the South team.

Up against North Melbourne in round 3, South tried placing Freyer in the unfamiliar position of half-forward, but his performance proved quieter. Versus Richmond the following week his marking and kicking were inhibited by the field's poor condition, but he was still able to demonstrate his speed.

Freyer suffered an injury partway through the season, keeping him out of the side for five weeks. He had done enough for The Age to name him among the "shining lights of the southern combination", and would return against Fitzroy in round 11. He was injured again in round 13, clashing with his teammate Charlie Stanbridge, but played the remaining matches of the season. An "effective display" against St Kilda in the penultimate round earned him praise.

In June 1926, Freyer requested League permission to transfer to Footscray. He became Footscray's 50th VFL player on his club debut in round 7, putting in a "prominent" defensive performance in a loss to Carlton. Freyer managed six further matches with Footscray.

Bill was brother to Ted Freyer, who also played in the VFL, though for Essendon.
