= Paddy McDonald =

Australian rules footballer

Personal information
- Full name: Patrick Joseph McDonald
- Born: 27 March 1897; Creswick, Victoria
- Died: 30 January 1965 (aged 67); Albury, New South Wales
- Height: 174 cm (5 ft 9 in)

Playing career^{1}
Years	Club	Games (Goals)
1918–1919	Essendon	9 (3)
- ^{1} Playing statistics correct to the end of 1919.

Patrick Joseph McDonald (27 March 1897 – 30 January 1965) was an Australian rules footballer who played for Essendon in the Victorian Football League (VFL).

== Family ==
The son of John Thomas McDonald (1863–1929), and Margaret Mary McDonald (1860–1936), née O'Brien, Patrick Joseph McDonald, known as "Paddy", was born at Allendale, Victoria on 27 March 1897.

He married Eileen Neville (1898–1976) in 1923.

== Football ==
McDonald began his VFL career for Essendon in 1918. He played his final VFL match in 1919 having played 9 matches. His brother Frank McDonald also played for Essendon.
