= Allan Belcher =

Australian rules footballer and coach

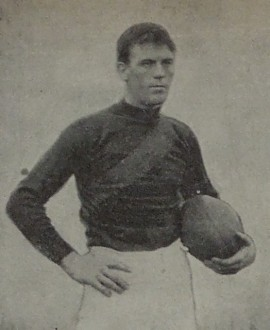
- Belcher in 1910

Personal information
- Full name: Allan Mitchell Parker Belcher
- Born: 2 December 1884; New Norfolk, Tasmania
- Died: 2 July 1921 (aged 36); Kew, Victoria
- Original team: Brunswick (VFA)
- Height: 179 cm (5 ft 10 in)
- Weight: 86 kg (190 lb)
- Position: Ruckman

Playing career^{1}
Years	Club	Games (Goals)
1904	Collingwood	4 (1)
1906–1919	Essendon	176 (40)
Total		180 (41)

Representative team honours^{2}
Years	Team	Games (Goals)
1906, 1907, 1911	Victoria	

Coaching career^{3}
Years	Club	Games (W–L–D)
1910	Essendon	19 (12–7–0)
- ^{1} Playing statistics correct to the end of 1919.^{2} Representative statistics correct as of 1911.^{3} Coaching statistics correct as of 1910.

Career highlights
- Essendon premiership captain 1912; Essendon captain 1910, 1912–1915, 1919

Allan Belcher (2 December 1884 – 2 July 1921) was an Australian rules footballer who played with and coached Essendon in the Victorian Football League (VFL). He was the brother of South Melbourne player Vic Belcher.

Belcher started his career with Collingwood but it was with Essendon that he established himself as one of the premier ruckmen in the league. Known as "King Belcher" formed a combination in the ruck with Fred Baring and Ernie Cameron, culminating in premiership success in 1912.

He was captain-coach of Essendon in 1910 and represented Victoria at interstate football in patches during his career. From 1912 to 1915 he captained the club and again in 1919 but it would be his final season, a broken toe forcing him to retire.

On 2 July 1921 – just two years after his last VFL game – Belcher succumbed to general paralysis in the Kew Hospital for the Insane. His once-robust frame had wasted away to just 57 kg by the time of his death.
