= Peter Wright (Australian footballer) =

Australian rules footballer (born 1996)

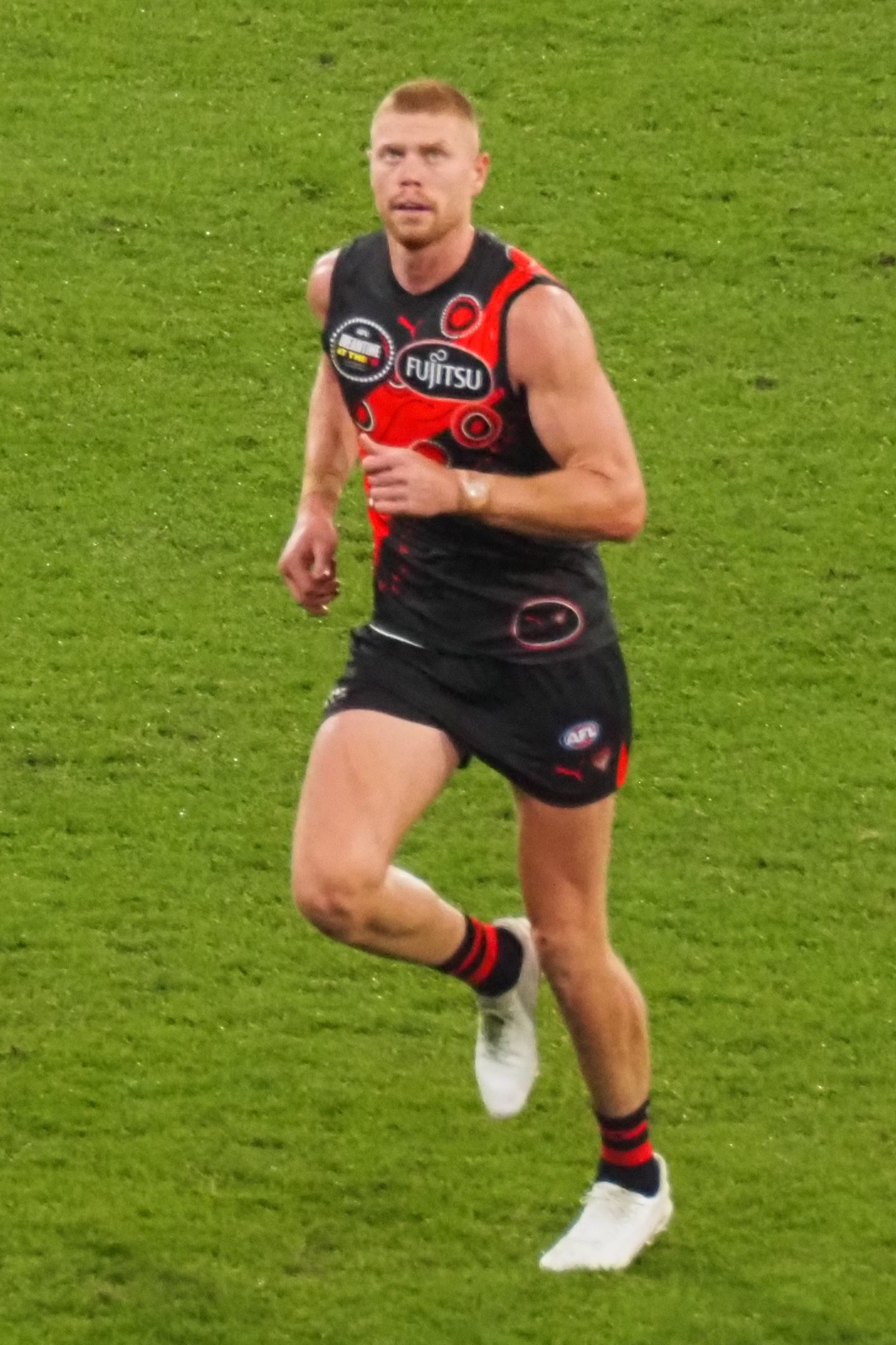
- Wright playing for Essendon in 2025

Personal information
- Full name: Peter Wright
- Nicknames: Two-metre Peter, Seven-seater Peter
- Born: 7 September 1996 (age 30)
- Original team: Calder Cannons (TAC Cup)
- Draft: No. 8, 2014 national draft
- Height: 203 cm (6 ft 8 in)
- Weight: 102 kg (225 lb)
- Position: Key forward / ruck

Club information
- Current club: Essendon
- Number: 20

Playing career^{1}
Years	Club	Games (Goals)
2015–2020	Gold Coast	66 (85)
2021–	Essendon	102 (172)
Total		167 (257)
- ^{1} Playing statistics correct to the end of round 22, 2026.

Career highlights
- Crichton Medal: 2022; 2x Essendon leading goalkicker: 2022, 2025; 22under22 team: 2017; AFL Rising Star nominee: 2016

Peter Wright (born 7 September 1996) is an Australian rules footballer who plays for the Essendon Football Club in the Australian Football League (AFL), having been initially drafted to the Gold Coast Suns with pick 8 in the 2014 AFL draft.

He grew up in the Melbourne suburb of Moonee Ponds and played junior football for Moonee Valley Football Club.

== AFL career ==
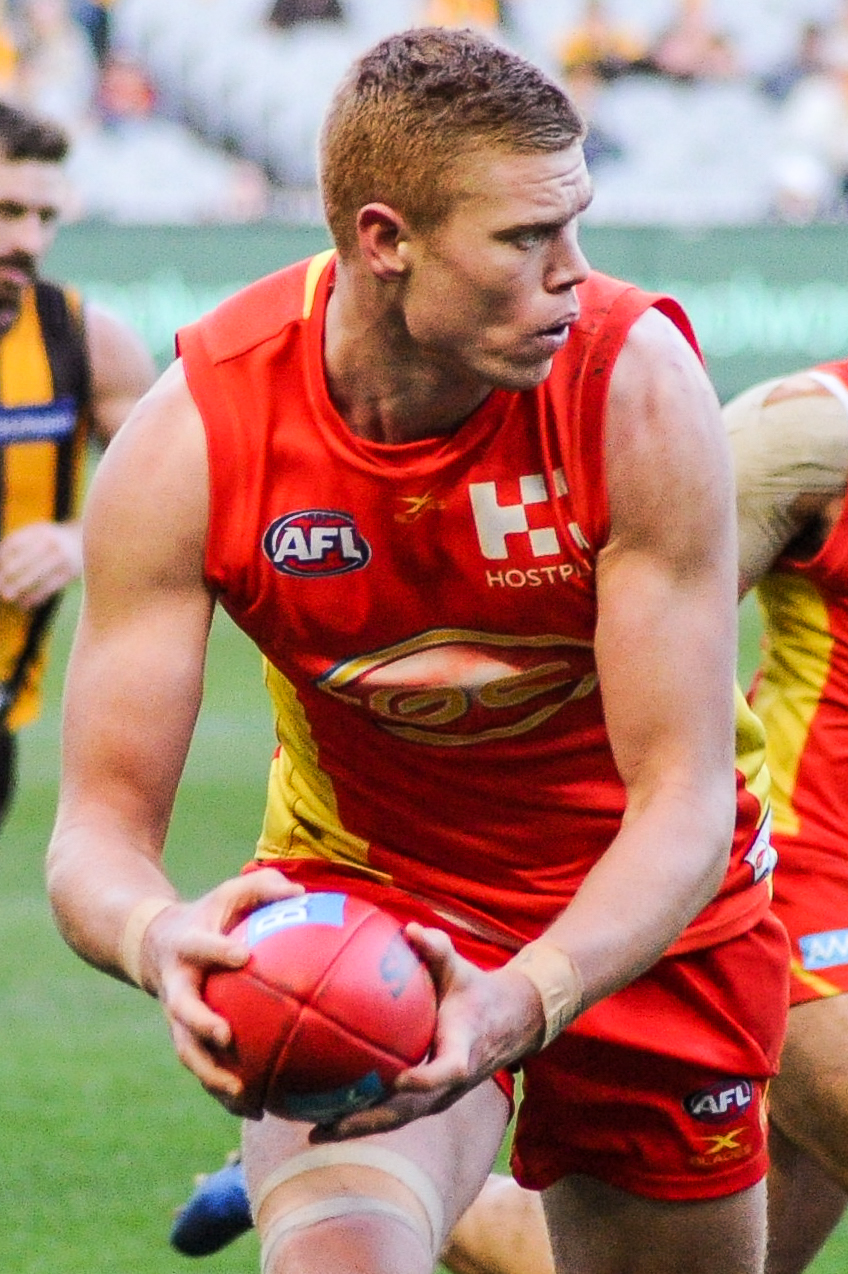
Wright playing for Gold Coast in 2017

=== Gold Coast: 2015–2020 ===
Wright established himself as a key marking forward, using his considerable height to his advantage. Wright made his debut in Round 10, 2015, kicking a goal in a losing effort against Sydney. In Round 11, 2017, Wright kicked the winning goal against West Coast for the Suns’ first win against the Eagles. After his debut season, Wright became a regular of the team, barely missing a game. In 2018, he suffered a knee injury that required rehab. Wright played 17 out of a possible 22 games in season 2019, but the emergence of Ben King in 2019 and the return of Zac Smith meant Wright wasn't able to get a game in 2020.

=== Essendon: 2021– ===
After six years at the Suns, he was traded to Essendon for more opportunities after the 2020 AFL season. Wright made an immediate impact, playing a pivotal role in Essendon’s forward line in the 2021 season. His best performance was in Round 21, where Wright kicked seven goals against the Western Bulldogs in a 13-point win. In Round 8 of the 2022 AFL season, Wright kicked 6 goals in the Bombers’ win over Hawthorn. In Round 14, Wright starred in their upset win against St Kilda, achieving four goals and 14 disposals. At the conclusion of the 2022 season, Wright was named Essendon Best and Fairest, winning the prestigious Crichton Medal as well as the club’s Leading Goalkicker award for his 53-goal season haul.

On 17 March, before Round 1 of the 2023 AFL season, Wright dislocated his shoulder during training after landing awkwardly in a marking contest and has since had a reconstruction of his shoulder.

Following the round two, 2024 match between the Sydney Swans and Essendon, Wright received a four-match suspension for a crude bump on Sydney defender Harry Cunningham, which resulted in Cunningham being substituted out of the match after only five minutes of play in the opening quarter.

== Statistics ==
Updated to the end of round 22, 2026.

Legend
G	Goals	K	Kicks	D	Disposals	T	Tackles
B	Behinds	H	Handballs	M	Marks

Season	Team	No.	Games	Totals							Averages (per game)							Votes
Season	Team	No.	Games	G	B	K	H	D	M	T	G	B	K	H	D	M	T	Votes
2015	Gold Coast	30	3	1	1	12	5	17	8	3	0.3	0.3	4.0	1.7	5.7	2.7	1.0	0
2016	Gold Coast	30	17	27	10	106	89	195	83	27	1.6	0.6	6.2	5.2	11.5	4.9	1.6	3
2017	Gold Coast	30	22	31	19	159	117	276	121	35	1.4	0.9	7.2	5.3	12.5	5.5	1.6	0
2018	Gold Coast	30	7	5	4	43	29	72	33	18	0.7	0.6	6.1	4.1	10.3	4.7	2.6	0
2019	Gold Coast	30	17	21	13	144	60	204	85	27	1.2	0.8	8.5	3.5	12.0	5.0	1.6	0
2020 (Note: The 2020 season was played with 17 home-and-away matches per team (down from 22) and 16-minute quarters with time on (down from 20-minute quarters with time on) due to the impact of the COVID-19 pandemic.)	Gold Coast	30	0	—	—	—	—	—	—	—	—	—	—	—	—	—	—	0
2021	Essendon	20	21	29	14	146	100	246	90	37	1.4	0.7	7.0	4.8	11.7	4.3	1.8	5
2022	Essendon	20	22	53	26	181	63	244	128	15	2.4	1.2	8.2	2.9	11.1	5.8	0.7	8
2023	Essendon	20	10	19	10	64	32	96	44	13	1.9	1.0	6.4	3.2	9.6	4.4	1.3	2
2024	Essendon	20	14	19	7	91	67	158	60	19	1.4	0.5	6.5	4.8	11.3	4.3	1.4	2
2025	Essendon	20	19	28	20	142	83	225	88	45	1.5	1.1	7.5	4.4	11.8	4.6	2.4	3
2026	Essendon	20	16	24	15	119	82	201	68	24	1.5	0.9	7.4	5.1	12.6	4.3	1.5	0
Career			168	257	139	1207	727	1934	808	263	1.5	0.8	7.2	4.3	11.5	4.8	1.6	23
