= Norman Waugh =

Australian rules footballer

Norm Waugh

Personal information
- Full name: Norman James Waugh
- Born: 10 May 1874; Prahran, Victoria
- Died: 6 August 1934 (aged 60); Johannesburg, South Africa
- Original team: Collegian Amateurs

Playing career^{1}
Years	Club	Games (Goals)
1897–1898	Essendon	23 (30)
- ^{1} Playing statistics correct to the end of 1898.

Career highlights
- VFL premiership player: 1897; Essendon leading goalkicker 1897; Jim 'Frosty' Miller Medal: 1896

Norman James "Norm" Waugh (10 May 1874 – 6 August 1934) was an Australian rules footballer who played for the Essendon Football Club in the Victorian Football League (VFL). In the first year of competition, he became one of the club's and leagues first premiership players, during the 1897 VFL season, under the captaincy of George Stuckey. Waugh made his debut against Geelong in Round 1 of the season, at Corio Oval. Waugh was also Essendon's first-ever leading goalkicker in a VFL season. His 23 goals was the third-highest in the League, behind Jack Leith of Melbourne (26), and Eddy James of Geelong (27).

He was the youngest son of Dr James S. Waugh, the first president of Wesley College. After retiring from football, he entered the insurance industry and became the chief executive officer of the National Mutual Company in South Africa. He died in Johannesburg in 1934, aged 60.
