= Stewart Crameri =

Australian rules footballer (born 1988)

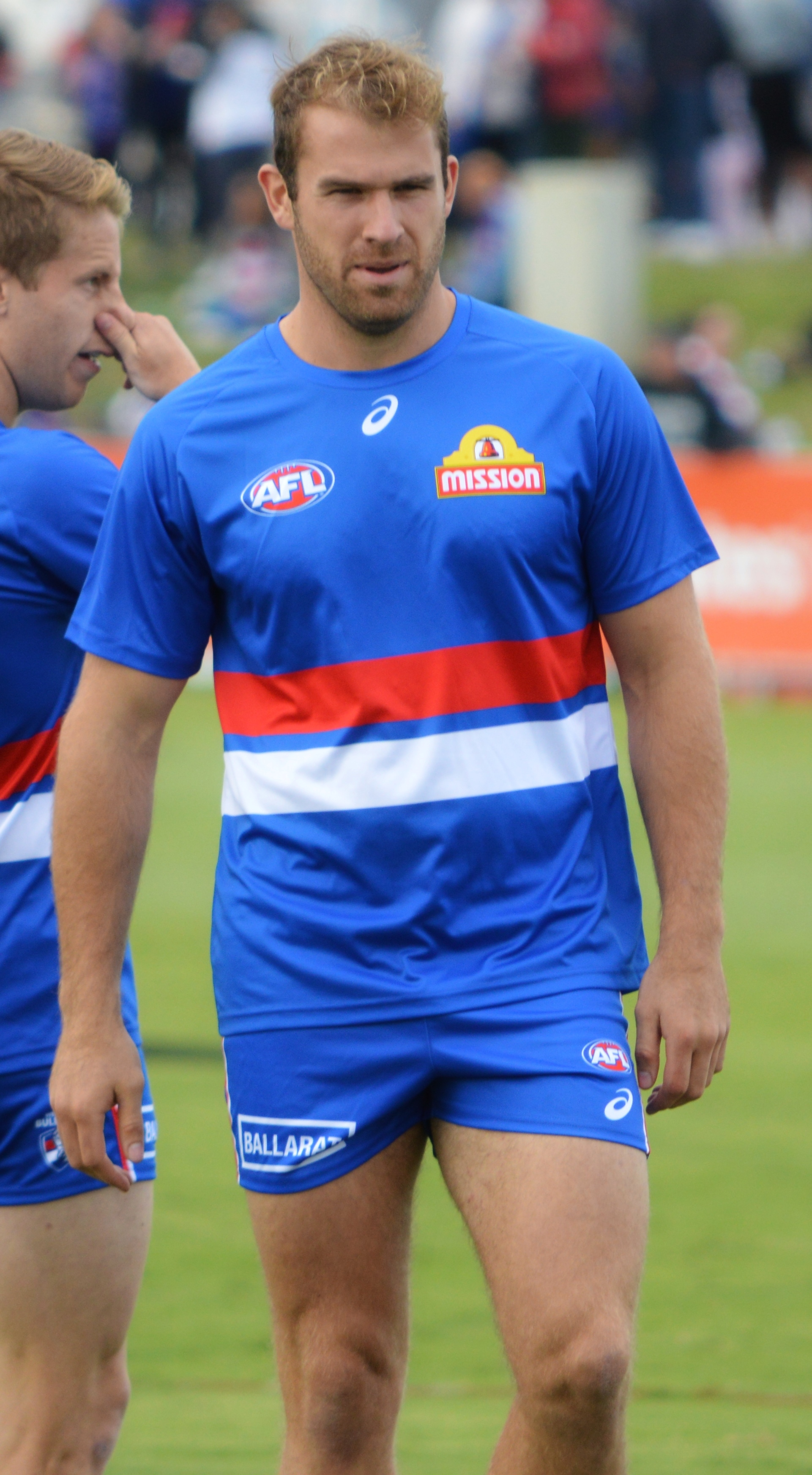
- Crameri with the Western Bulldogs in February 2017

Personal information
- Full name: Stewart Crameri
- Born: 10 August 1988 (age 38)
- Original team: Bendigo Bombers (VFL)
- Draft: No. 43, 2009 rookie draft
- Height: 190 cm (6 ft 3 in)
- Weight: 96 kg (212 lb)
- Position: Forward

Playing career^{1}
Years	Club	Games (Goals)
2010–2013	Essendon	57 (96)
2014–2017	Western Bulldogs	42 (70)
2018	Geelong	4 (5)
Total		103 (171)
- ^{1} Playing statistics correct to the end of 2018.

Career highlights
- 3× Essendon leading goalkicker: 2011, 2012, 2013; Western Bulldogs leading goalkicker: 2014

Stewart Crameri (born 10 August 1988) is a former professional Australian rules footballer who played for Essendon, Western Bulldogs and Geelong in the Australian Football League (AFL).

== Early life ==
Crameri was selected by Essendon with the forty-third pick in the 2009 rookie draft. After spending three seasons with the Bendigo Bombers, Crameri was finally given a chance at senior football after strong rumours in 2008 that he would be drafted by Essendon.

In 2009, he was one of the few shining lights in a very dark year for the Bendigo Bombers who went through the season rooted to the bottom of the ladder and winless. He originally played for Maryborough Football Club in the Bendigo Football League, and unlike most Victorians in the AFL, did not play in the TAC Cup as a junior.

== AFL career ==
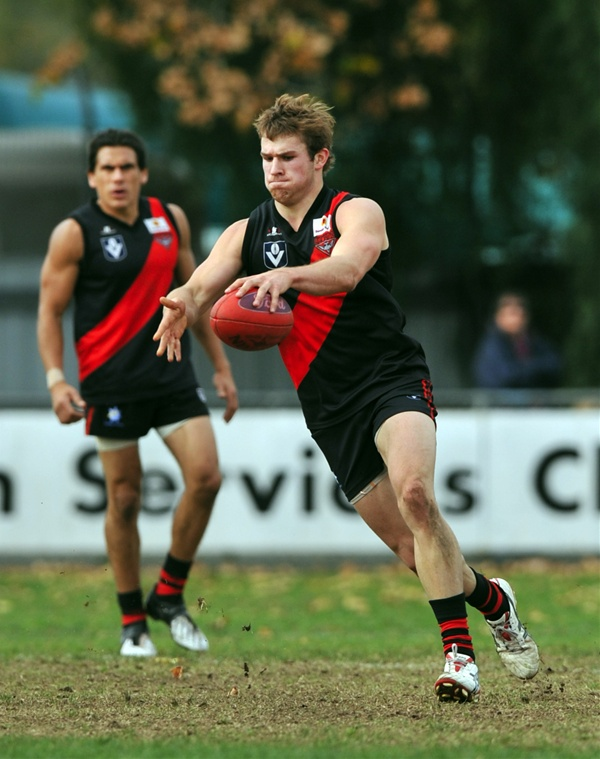
Crameri playing in the VFL in 2009

Crameri made his AFL debut for Essendon against Collingwood in Round 20 of the 2010 AFL season.

Crameri played the 2011 season up forward for Essendon, kicking 34 goals and was the club's leading goalkicker. At the Crichton Medal, Essendon FC Best & Fairest, he was awarded the Matthew Lloyd Leading Goal Kicking Award, and was the Essendon Football Club Most Improved player for 2011.

For the 2012 season, Crameri has inherited the #12 guernsey formerly worn by Andrew Welsh, who retired at the end of the 2011 season.

The Goldfields Region Sports Association awarded Crameri the Jack Worrall Medal for the region's most outstanding sportsperson for 2011.

On Thursday 24 October 2013, it was announced that Crameri had been traded from Essendon to the Western Bulldogs in exchange for pick number 26 in the National Draft.

Crameri, along with 33 other past and present Essendon players, was found guilty of using a banned performance-enhancing substance, thymosin beta-4, as part of Essendon's sports supplements program during the 2012 season. He and his teammates were initially found not guilty in March 2015 by the AFL Anti-Doping Tribunal, but a guilty verdict was returned in January 2016 after an appeal by the World Anti-Doping Agency. He was suspended for two years which, with backdating, ended in November 2016; as a result, he served approximately fourteen months of his suspension and missed the entire 2016 AFL season, including the Bulldogs' premiership win in October.

Crameri played just two matches in 2017, before undergoing hip surgery which would ultimately sideline him for the remainder of the season.

Crameri was delisted by the Bulldogs at the conclusion of the 2017 AFL season, but was taken by the Geelong Cats in the 2017 rookie draft.

== Statistics ==
Statistics are correct to the end of the 2012 season.

Legend
G	Goals	K	Kicks	D	Disposals	T	Tackles
B	Behinds	H	Handballs	M	Marks

Season	Team	No.	Games	Totals							Averages (per game)						
Season	Team	No.	Games	G	B	K	H	D	M	T	G	B	K	H	D	M	T
2010	Essendon	45	3	0	1	20	33	53	8	6	0.0	0.3	6.7	11.0	17.7	2.7	2.0
2011	Essendon	45	20	34	22	167	156	323	104	48	1.7	1.1	8.4	7.8	16.2	5.2	2.4
2012	Essendon	12	18	32	29	132	116	248	75	40	1.8	1.6	7.3	6.4	13.8	4.2	2.2
Career			41	66	52	319	305	624	187	94	1.6	1.3	7.8	7.4	15.2	4.6	2.3
