= Paul Salmon =

Australian rules footballer, born 1965

Personal information
- Full name: Paul Salmon
- Born: 20 January 1965 (age 61)
- Original team: North Ringwood
- Height: 206 cm (6 ft 9 in)
- Weight: 112 kg (247 lb)
- Positions: Full Forward, Ruckman

Playing career^{1}
Years	Club	Games (Goals)
1983–1995	Essendon	209 (509)
1996–2000	Hawthorn	100 (41)
2002	Essendon	15 (11)
Total		324 (561)

Representative team honours
Years	Team	Games (Goals)
1984–1997	Victoria	14 (45)
- ^{1} Playing statistics correct to the end of 2002.

Career highlights
- Club: 2× VFL/AFL premiership player: 1985, 1993; 2× Peter Crimmins Memorial Trophy: 1996, 1997; All Australian team: 1987, 1988, 1997; 7× Essendon leading goalkicker: 1984, 1987, 1988, 1989, 1990, 1992, 1993; 3× pre-season premiership: 1990, 1994, 1999; Michael Tuck Medal: 1999; Hawthorn Team of the Century; Essendon FC Hall of Fame; Representative: Tassie Medal: 1988; 3 × All Australian team: 1987, 1988, 1997; Overall: Australian Football Hall of Fame

Paul Salmon (born 20 January 1965) is a former Australian rules footballer who played in the Australian Football League for Essendon and Hawthorn. Recruited from North Ringwood, Salmon had a prolific career, with many accolades such as being inducted into the Australian Football Hall of Fame, a two-time premiership player, seven-time leading goalkicker at Essendon, and the fourth-highest goalkicker for Essendon.

At 206 cm (6 ft 9 in), Salmon was, at the time, along with Carlton's Justin Madden, the tallest man to play in the AFL upon debut; however, this record would be broken several times. Also known as "Fish", Salmon was a well-known full-forward and ruckman in the Australian Football League over a long period of time.

== Football career ==
=== AFL ===
==== Essendon (1983–1995) ====
He made his debut in 1983 with Essendon; however, it was during the 1984 VFL season that he established himself as the league's leading full-forward, kicking 63 goals in 13 games. Essendon's leading ruckman at the time was the illustrious Simon Madden, which allowed Bombers coach Kevin Sheedy the luxury of playing the accurate kicking "Fish" up forward. His effectiveness in the position was due to his athleticism and ability to win one-on-one marking contests, using his superior height and mobility. At the time, Salmon was the VFL's equal-tallest player alongside Carlton's Justin Madden (coincidentally, Simon Madden's younger brother), and one of only a handful of VFL players who stood over 200 cm (6 ft 7 in) tall at the time.

While leading the goalkicking with 63 goals in just 13 games, halfway through the 1984 season, a serious knee injury that required a full reconstruction left him sidelined for over a year; he then recovered to kick 6 goals and 4 behinds in the 1985 premiership side. From this point onward, the 20-year-old Salmon would rotate between full-forward and his favoured ruck position with Simon Madden. Salmon endured further minor complications with his knee injury and numerous soft tissue injuries over the next few years and was never allowed to settle in a specific on-field role; despite this, he played a vital role for the team, becoming vice-captain in 1992 and culminating in leading the Bombers' season goalkicking tally on seven occasions as well as playing in Essendon's 1993 premiership, where he kicked 5 goals to help Essendon to a 44-point win over Carlton in the Grand Final in front of 96,862 fans at the Melbourne Cricket Ground.

After serious injuries to his Achilles tendon and groin in 1993 and 1994, respectively, and with the knowledge that his playing time was running out, he decided his time as a Bomber was over at 31 years of age, so he requested a new home and was subsequently traded to Hawthorn, the club whom he supported as a child. He was selected in Kevin Sheedy's best team of his 27 years as coach and at number 26 in the 'Champions of Essendon', which was a list of the best of the past century who wore the red and black, missing the top-25 cutoff by a single position.

Salmon has been quoted saying that, while he has great respect for Sheedy, he felt at times he didn't get the best out of him, from perhaps lack of communication. However, he has also spoken in glowing terms about Sheedy being good for his career. In such situations such as in late 1985 when Salmon had recently come back from injury, and was out of form and playing in the reserves, Sheedy made a deal with him that, if he trained hard and if Essendon made the Grand Final, he would play him regardless of his form, a promise that was delivered by both parties.

==== Hawthorn (1996–2000) ====
At the conclusion of the 1995 season, Salmon moved to Hawthorn, where he played from 1996 to 2000, and revived his career by winning the Best and Fairest in 1996 and 1997 as well as the Most Consistent Award in 1998. He became vice-captain in 1998 and also finished in the top ten in every best and fairest in each of his five years at the club. After 5 seasons and 100 games with the Hawks, he retired at the age of 35; and, after his retirement, he was named in Hawthorn's Team of the Century.

In 1997, Salmon achieved All-Australian selection, being named in the ruck.

In 1999, he won the Michael Tuck Medal for a best-on-ground performance in the winning Hawk's Night Grand Final.

==== Return to Essendon (2002) ====
Salmon retired from playing football at the end of the 2000 season. He made a comeback in 2002, after being drafted by Essendon at 37 years of age. He played 15 games in 2002 before permanently retiring from AFL football.

=== State of Origin ===
Salmon had a prolific State of Origin career, kicking 45 goals in 14 games. He first played for Victoria in 1984, against South Australia, kicking 5 goals. Salmon next played at State of Origin level in 1986 against South Australia, kicking 4 goals. In the same year, he participated in a game against Western Australia that has been regarded as "one of the greatest games in the 150-year history of Australian Football", but didn't trouble the scoreboard.

In 1987, he performed well, kicking 5 goals and being named in the best players, against Western Australia in Perth. The following year Salmon performed in the State of Origin Carnival, winning the Tassie Medal, kicking 7 goals in the semi-final, and 1 goal in the final.

In 1990, he was picked against New South Wales, on a wet day at the SCG, scoring 1 goal, in an upset loss against favourites Victoria. In 1992, he kicked 5 goals against South Australia and was named in the best players.

In 1993, in the State of Origin Carnival, Salmon kicked 6 goals in the semi-final against the combined New South Wales–Australian Capital Territory side, but he didn't perform in the Grand Final, failing to score a goal. Salmon last played for Victoria in 1997, against South Australia. Being named in the Ruck for the first time, Salmon performed well, being named best on ground.

== Statistics ==
Legend
G	Goals	K	Kicks	D	Disposals	T	Tackles
B	Behinds	H	Handballs	M	Marks	H/O	Hit-outs

Season	Team	No.	Games	Totals								Averages (per game)								Votes
Season	Team	No.	Games	G	B	K	H	D	M	T	H/O	G	B	K	H	D	M	T	H/O	Votes
1983	Essendon	3	9	14	4	40	17	57	23	—N/a	44	1.6	0.4	4.4	1.9	6.3	2.6	—N/a	4.9	0
1984	Essendon	3	13	63	36	137	22	159	91	—N/a	84	4.8	2.8	10.5	1.7	12.2	7.0	—N/a	6.5	10
1985†	Essendon	3	4	15	10	28	4	32	21	—N/a	4	3.8	2.5	7.0	1.0	8.0	5.3	—N/a	1.0	0
1986	Essendon	3	21	46	32	163	64	227	124	—N/a	154	2.2	1.5	7.8	3.0	10.8	5.9	—N/a	7.3	5
1987	Essendon	3	22	43	22	173	75	248	114	24	214	2.0	1.0	7.9	3.4	11.3	5.2	1.1	9.7	6
1988	Essendon	3	19	37	23	180	63	243	108	18	126	1.9	1.2	9.5	3.3	12.8	5.7	0.9	6.6	0
1989	Essendon	3	16	39	16	161	51	212	96	5	144	2.4	1.0	10.1	3.2	13.3	6.0	0.3	9.0	0
1990	Essendon	3	21	43	25	249	67	316	171	11	208	2.0	1.2	11.9	3.2	15.0	8.1	0.5	9.9	11
1991	Essendon	3	18	30	14	199	91	290	151	11	176	1.7	0.8	11.1	5.1	16.1	8.4	0.6	9.8	7
1992	Essendon	3	19	59	23	203	80	283	138	12	148	3.1	1.2	10.7	4.2	14.9	7.3	0.6	7.8	10
1993†	Essendon	3	20	65	41	227	83	310	157	11	194	3.3	2.1	11.4	4.2	15.5	7.9	0.6	9.7	4
1994	Essendon	3	14	16	13	116	75	191	70	12	165	1.1	0.9	8.3	5.4	13.6	5.0	0.9	11.8	0
1995	Essendon	3	13	39	23	98	41	139	79	5	29	3.0	1.8	7.5	3.2	10.7	6.1	0.4	2.2	1
1996	Hawthorn	4	18	4	1	158	146	304	110	24	252	0.2	0.1	8.8	8.1	16.9	6.1	1.3	14.0	18
1997	Hawthorn	4	21	13	5	179	162	341	128	29	352	0.6	0.2	8.5	7.7	16.2	6.1	1.4	16.8	13
1998	Hawthorn	4	20	7	3	176	155	331	110	26	549	0.4	0.2	8.8	7.8	16.6	5.5	1.3	27.5	14
1999	Hawthorn	4	17	9	5	150	88	238	84	8	380	0.5	0.3	8.8	5.2	14.0	4.9	0.5	22.4	6
2000	Hawthorn	4	24	8	4	198	101	299	135	14	443	0.3	0.2	8.3	4.2	12.5	5.6	0.6	18.5	4
2002	Essendon	4	15	11	3	71	60	131	56	14	231	0.7	0.2	4.7	4.0	8.7	3.7	0.9	15.4	0
Career			324	561	303	2906	1445	4351	1966	224	3897	1.7	0.9	9.0	4.5	13.4	6.1	0.8	12.0	109

== Career after football ==
Salmon has also worked in the media co-hosting Sportsworld for the Seven Network and Time Out for Serious Fun for the Nine Network, and he has released several books. He released an autobiography called The Big Fish: Paul Salmon's Own Story in 2001; Fish Tales, a book recalling humorous on- and off-field incidents, in 2002; and he followed up in 2003 with another book, called More Fish Tales: Favourite Yarns From A Footballing Life.

He also worked as a coach of the First XVIII Football team at Carey Baptist Grammar School; he retired from that position in 2008 to spend more time with his family and concentrate on business interests.

In August 2022, Salmon defeated former Essendon teammate Jason Johnson on the "Lou's Handball" segment of The Sunday Footy Show with a score of 76–74.
