= Jack Kirby (Australian footballer) =

Australian rules footballer

Personal information
- Full name: John James Kirby
- Born: 1 July 1889; South Melbourne, Victoria
- Died: 11 March 1939 (aged 49); Carlton, Victoria
- Original team: Prahran Juniors
- Height: 170 cm (5 ft 7 in)
- Weight: 70 kg (154 lb)
- Positions: Small forward, half-back flank

Playing career^{1}
Years	Club	Games (Goals)
1911–15, 1918	Essendon	77 (113)
- ^{1} Playing statistics correct to the end of 1918.

John James Kirby (1 July 1889 – 11 March 1939) was an Australian rules footballer who played with Essendon in the Victorian Football League (VFL).

Kirby was a small forward and is the earliest known player to have kicked a goal with his first kick in the VFL, scored in 1911; this achievement would not be made again for nine years, when Gordon Coventry, an AFL Legend of the Australian Football Hall of Fame replicated the feat in 1920. Kirby had a good start to his career from a team point of view as well, not experiencing a loss until his 15th game. Kirby topped Essendon's goalkicking table in 1912, with 43 goals, and again the following season when he kicked 29 goals. He was a member of Essendon's premiership teams in 1911 and 1912.
