= Bert Armstrong =

Australian rules footballer

Personal information
- Full name: Albert Clarence Armstrong
- Born: 26 February 1890; Sandhurst, Victoria
- Died: 15 August 1969 (aged 79); Melbourne, Victoria
- Original team: North Melbourne (VFA)
- Height: 175 cm (5 ft 9 in)
- Weight: 72 kg (159 lb)

Playing career^{1}
Years	Club	Games (Goals)
1910–1914	Essendon	42 (55)
- ^{1} Playing statistics correct to the end of 1914.

Albert Clarence "Bert" Armstrong (26 February 1890 – 15 August 1969) was an Australian rules footballer who played with Essendon in the Victorian Football League (VFL).

Armstrong, a full-forward, was recruited from North Melbourne, then playing in the Victorian Football Association. He was Essendon's leading goal-kicker in 1910, his first season, with 30 goals. In 1911 he kicked 25 goals, which were enough to finish equal second in the goal-kicking, behind his elder brother Lou Armstrong. He twice kicked six goals in a game for Essendon, against Melbourne in 1910 at the MCG and Collingwood the following year at East Melbourne. Injury kept him out of both Essendon's 1911 and 1912 premiership teams and sciatica problems meant he didn't play at all in 1913. Armstrong crossed to Essendon Association during the 1914 season. He also played for Brighton during his career.
