= Geoff Blethyn =

Australian rules footballer

Personal information
- Full name: Geoffrey Russell Blethyn
- Born: 28 October 1950 (age 76); Moreland, Victoria
- Original team: St Andrew's
- Height: 183 cm (6 ft 0 in)
- Weight: 80 kg (176 lb)

Playing career^{1}
| Years | Club | Games (Goals) |
| 1968–1972, 1976 | Essendon | 84 (216) |
| 1973–1975 | Claremont | 33 (104) |
| 1977 | Port Adelaide | 11 (13) |
| Total | | 128 (333) |
- ^{1} Playing statistics correct to the end of 1977.

Career highlights
- Port Adelaide premiership player (1977)

Geoffrey Russell Blethyn (born 28 October 1950) is a former leading Australian rules footballer who played with Essendon in the Victorian Football League (VFL), Claremont in the Western Australian Football League (WAFL) and Port Adelaide in the South Australian Football League (SANFL).

== Family ==
The son of Oliver Blethyn (1910-2004), and Honor Evelyn Blethyn (1917-2000), née Searle, Geoffrey Russell Blethyn was born at Moreland, Victoria on 28 October 1950.

== Football career ==
=== Essendon (1968–1972) ===
A full-forward, Blethyn had a slim frame and famously wore glasses on the field.

He made his debut in April 1968 when he was selected on the half-forward flank in place of the injured Alan Noonan.

He kicked four goals in Essendon's 1968 Grand Final loss to Carlton, and had his most prolific game up forward when he kicked 11 goals against Footscray during the 1972 VFL season. 1972 was a record breaking-year for Blethyn—he finished it with 107 goals and became the first Essendon player since John Coleman in 1950 to kick over 100 in a season. However, he missed out on the Coleman Medal to Collingwood's Peter McKenna, who kicked 130 goals for the season.

=== Claremont (1973–1975) ===
From 1973 to 1975 Blethyn played for WAFL club Claremont.

=== Essendon (1976) ===
Blethyn returned to Essendon in 1976, where he topped his team's goalkicking table with 39 goals. It was the third time Blethyn had finished a season as Essendon's top goalkicker, having previously done so in 1970 and 1972.

=== Port Adelaide (1977) ===
Blethyn left Essendon for good in 1977 when he transferred to SANFL club Port Adelaide. In that season, he played in the only premiership side of his career.

== After football ==
Blethyn currently lives in Adelaide and works as a property advisor.

== Bibliography ==
- Maplestone, M., Flying Higher: History of the Essendon Football Club 1872–1996, Essendon Football Club, (Melbourne), 1996. ISBN 0-9591740-2-8
- Ross, J. (ed), 100 Years of Australian Football 1897–1996: The Complete Story of the AFL, All the Big Stories, All the Great Pictures, All the Champions, Every AFL Season Reported, Viking, (Ringwood), 1996. ISBN 0-670-86814-0
