= Fred Gallagher (footballer) =

Australian rules footballer (1931–2025)

Personal information
- Full name: Fred Gallagher
- Born: 1 January 1931
- Died: September 2025 (aged 94)
- Original team: Rosebud
- Height: 183 cm (6 ft 0 in)
- Weight: 83 kg (183 lb)
- Position: Forward

Playing career^{1}
Years	Club	Games (Goals)
1952–58	Essendon	84 (61)
- ^{1} Playing statistics correct to the end of 1958.

Fred Gallagher (1 January 1931 – September 2025) was an Australian rules footballer who played for Essendon in the Victorian Football League (VFL) during the 1950s.

== Career ==
Initially a half forward, Gallagher hailed from Rosebud. His 34 goals in 1957 was enough to top the goal-kicking at Essendon, helped by a haul of 12 goals and four behinds from full-forward in their round eight win over Geelong at Windy Hill. In doing so he joined John Coleman and Ted Freyer as the only players to have kicked 12 goals or more in a game for Essendon. He also booted three majors in the 1957 VFL Grand Final where he was his club's only multiple goal-kicker in a 61-point loss to Melbourne. With his place in the side no longer assured in 1958, Gallagher opted to join New South Wales club Turvey Park as captain-coach.

== Death ==
Gallagher died in September 2025, at the age of 94.

== Sources ==
- Fred Gallagher's playing statistics from AFL Tables
- Holmesby, Russell and Main, Jim (2007). The Encyclopedia of AFL Footballers. 7th ed. Melbourne: Bas Publishing.
