= Leo Ryan (footballer) =

Australian rules footballer, born 1913

Personal information
- Full name: Leo Richard Ryan
- Born: 26 August 1913; Wonthaggi, Victoria
- Died: 29 December 1972 (aged 59); Footscray, Victoria
- Original team: Fish Creek
- Height: 175 cm (5 ft 9 in)
- Weight: 70 kg (154 lb)
- Position: Back pocket

Playing career^{1}
Years	Club	Games (Goals)
1934–41	Footscray	119 (3)
- ^{1} Playing statistics correct to the end of 1941.

Leo Richard Ryan (26 August 1913 – 29 December 1972) was an Australian rules footballer who played with Footscray in the Victorian Football League (VFL). Ryan's career ended after he suffered a serious injury after a collision during the match against Melbourne in Round 17 of the 1941 VFL season.
