= Dave Walsh (Australian footballer) =

Australian rules footballer

Personal information
- Full name: John David Walsh
- Born: 29 September 1898; Caulfield, Victoria
- Died: 4 August 1975 (aged 76); Essendon, Victoria
- Height: 177 cm (5 ft 10 in)
- Weight: 75 kg (165 lb)

Playing career^{1}
Years	Club	Games (Goals)
1918–1920	Essendon	25 (18)
1920–1921	Essendon A (VFA)	32 (30)
1921–1924	North Melbourne (VFA)	51 (18)
1925–1927	North Melbourne	47 (0)
- ^{1} Playing statistics correct to the end of 1927.

Dave Walsh (29 September 1898 – 4 August 1975) was an Australian rules footballer who played with Essendon and North Melbourne in the Victorian Football League (VFL).

Walsh was recruited by Essendon from the local Essendon District League. He played as a full-forward for Essendon in the 1919 VFL season and topped their goal-kicking with 15 goals. After a stint in the Victorian Football Association at Essendon Association, Walsh joined North Melbourne, where he finished his career as a full-back. He finished equal fifth in the 1926 Brownlow Medal. He represented Victoria six times, in 1925 and 1926 and was a member of their squad for 1927 Melbourne Carnival, but had to withdraw with a knee injury, which ended his career.
