= Ernie Lumsden =

Australian rules footballer

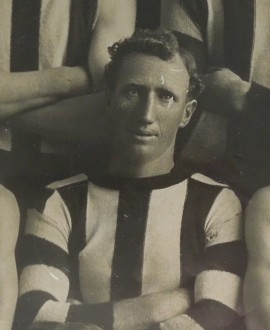
- Lumsden in 1919

Personal information
- Full name: Ernest Arthur Lumsden
- Born: 27 June 1890; Collingwood, Victoria
- Died: 8 August 1982 (aged 92); Ringwood, Victoria
- Original team: Northcote (VFA)
- Height: 175 cm (5 ft 9 in)
- Weight: 71 kg (157 lb)

Playing career^{1}
Years	Club	Games (Goals)
1910–1912	Collingwood	15 (5)
1913–1915	Essendon	34 (49)
1917–1920	Collingwood	63 (52)
Total		112 (106)
- ^{1} Playing statistics correct to the end of 1920.

Ernest 'Ernie' Lumsden (27 June 1890 – 8 August 1982) was an Australian rules footballer who played for Collingwood and Essendon in the Victorian Football League (VFL).

== Football ==
He was also known by his nickname 'Snowy' and was a cousin of teammate Dick Lee.

A utility player, Lumsden started his Collingwood career in 1910 but struggled to hold his place in the side with just 15 games in three seasons. As a result, he crossed to Essendon in 1913 where he played mainly as a forward, topping their goalkicking in 1914 with 28 goals. He had more success in his second stint at Collingwood, getting regular games and playing in the club's 1917 and 1919 premierships, in a forward pocket.
