= Keith Forbes =

Australian rules footballer and coach

Personal information
- Full name: Keith MacKenzie Forbes
- Born: 28 May 1906
- Died: 7 September 1996 (aged 90)
- Original team: South Melbourne Districts
- Height: 5 ft 7 in (171 cm)
- Weight: 11 st 5 lb (72 kg)
- Position: Rover

Playing career^{1}
Years	Club	Games (Goals)
1926–1928	Coburg (VFA)	30 (59)
1928–1937	Essendon (VFL)	152 (415)
1938–1939	North Melbourne (VFL)	31 (50)
1940	Fitzroy (VFL)	4 (10)
Total		187 (475)

Coaching career
Years	Club	Games (W–L–D)
1938–1939	North Melbourne	34 (11–23–0)
- ^{1} Playing statistics correct to the end of 1940.

Keith MacKenzie Forbes (28 May 1906 – 7 September 1996) was an Australian rules footballer who played for Coburg in the Victorian Football Association (VFA), and for Essendon, North Melbourne (as captain-coach), and Fitzroy in the Victorian Football League (VFL).

A small goalkicking rover, he stood at 5 feet 7 inches (171 cm). Forbes' 475 career goals is the most by any player who never played finals in VFL/AFL history. Forbes kicked eight or more goals in a match three times, all for Essendon at Windy Hill: eight against Fitzroy in 1929, eight against North Melbourne in 1934, and nine against South Melbourne in 1936.

== Family ==
The son of Donald Forbes, and Sarah Jane Forbes, née MacPhail, Keith MacKenzie Forbes was born on 28 May 1906.

He married Dorothy Viola Brown on 25 November 1935.

== Coburg ==
After being told by his local club South Melbourne that he was too small for league football, Forbes signed with new VFA club Coburg. He played a total of 30 games for the VFA Lions over the three seasons from 1926 to 1928, and was part of the 1927 premiership team.

== Essendon ==
Forbes transferred to Essendon without a clearance from Coburg, having played for Coburg for the first five matches in the VFA's 1928 season, as did another two of his 1927 Grand Final winning Coburg team-mates, Aub Charleston, and Ernie Martin.

He was twice runner-up in the Brownlow Medal; in 1930 (joint), and in 1935. He took Essendon's best and fairest twice, and was runner-up on two occasions.

He captained Essendon in 1934, 1935, and 1937. He stepped aside to allow Jack Baggott to captain/coach in 1936 and part of 1937, serving as the team's vice-captain.

In nine of his ten years with Essendon, he either won, or was runner-up in goalkicking. In his first year with Essendon (1928), despite missing the first five matches, (Note: Forbes made his debut in round 6 against Richmond.) he came third. He kicked his 200th VFL goal in 1932 and was the first Essendon player to achieve this milestone. Forbes went on to also be the first Essendon player to kick both 300 and 400 goals. He achieved the 300 goal mark during the 1935 season, and then the 400 goal mark during his final, tenth year at Essendon in 1937.

Forbes was reported for attempting to kick Leo Ryan during the round 12 match against Footscray on 28 July 1934; and, following the VFL Tribunal's hearing on 31 July 1934, Forbes was suspended for four weeks.

== North Melbourne ==
In 1938 and 1939 Forbes was captain-coach of North Melbourne. During the fiery round 16 match against Richmond on 12 August 1939, in which the spectators invaded the ground and mobbed the players and umpires at the end of the match, Forbes was reported for two offences:

1. disputing the field umpire's decisions, and
2. having used threatening language to the field umpire (Stanley Morgan)

Following the VFL Tribunal's hearing on 15 August 1939, Forbes was suspended for six matches.

== Fitzroy ==
Having served the remaining four weeks of his 1939 suspension, Forbes played four senior games with Fitzroy in 1940.

== Recognition ==
=== Essendon's Team of the Century ===
In 1997, he was selected as an interchange player in Essendon's "Team of the Century".

=== Champions of Essendon ===
In 2002 an Essendon panel ranked him at 16 in their Champions of Essendon list of the 25 greatest players ever to have played for Essendon.

=== Essendon Hall of Fame ===
Forbes was inducted into the Essendon Football Club's Hall of Fame in 2011. His average of goals per game during his 10 years at the Bombers (2.73) ranks him in the top 3 goal kicking rovers in VFL/AFL history.

== External sources ==
- "Essendon's Leader". The Weekly Times. 7 July 1934. p. 64.
- Maplestone, M. (1996). Flying Higher: History of the Essendon Football Club 1872–1996. Melbourne: Essendon Football Club. ISBN 0-9591740-2-8.
- Ross, J., ed. (1996). 100 Years of Australian Football 1897–1996: The Complete Story of the AFL, All the Big Stories, All the Great Pictures, All the Champions, Every AFL Season Reported. Ringwood: Viking. ISBN 0-670-86814-0.
- Coburg Football Club 1891–1990 Centenary Year Book (PDF). Coburg Football Club. 1990. Archived from the original (PDF) on 16 October 2014.
