= Tommy Jenkins (Australian footballer) =

Australian rules footballer, born 1902

Personal information
- Full name: Thomas J. Jenkins
- Born: 6 June 1902
- Died: 6 August 1979 (aged 77)
- Original team: North Melbourne (VFA)
- Height: 173 cm (5 ft 8 in)
- Weight: 93 kg (205 lb)
- Position: Full-forward

Playing career^{1}
| Years | Club | Games (Goals) |
| 1921–1925 | Essendon | 63 (150) |
| 1927 | North Melbourne | 3 (4) |
| Total | | 66 (154) |

Representative team honours^{2}
| Years | Team | Games (Goals) |
| 1922 | Victoria | 1 (?) |
- ^{1} Playing statistics correct to the end of 1927.^{2} Representative statistics correct as of 1922.

Thomas J. Jenkins (6 June 1902 – 6 August 1979) was an Australian rules footballer who played with Essendon and North Melbourne in the Victorian Football League (VFL) during the 1920s.

Jenkins arrived at Essendon in 1921 after his VFA club North Melbourne had disbanded and spent five seasons with the Bombers. Short but large, Jenkins played mostly as a full-forward and was a premiership player in 1923 and 1924. He twice topped Essendon's goalkicking, in 1924 with 50 goals and 1925 with 37 goals. His best tally in a game was nine goals against North Melbourne in 1925, who had by then reformed and joined the VFL. In 1927, he returned to his old club but could manage only three senior games.

In later life he ran a stall at the Queen Victoria Market.
