= Norm Beckton =

Australian rules footballer and coach

Personal information
- Full name: Norman Aubrey Beckton
- Born: 4 May 1898; Brunswick, Victoria
- Died: 8 September 1984 (aged 86); Leongatha, Victoria
- Original team: Essendon Association (VFA)
- Height: 189 cm (6 ft 2 in)
- Weight: 93 kg (205 lb)

Playing career^{1}
Years	Club	Games (Goals)
1921–1930	Essendon	173 (157)
- ^{1} Playing statistics correct to the end of 1930.

Norman Aubrey Beckton (4 May 1898 – 8 September 1984) was an Australian rules footballer who played with Essendon in the Victorian Football League (VFL) during the 1920s.

Born in Brunswick, Beckton enlisted aged 18 in the Australian Imperial Force (AIF) on 18 July 1916, and served as a sapper with the 3rd Division Signal Corps. The 3rd Division Signal Corps served on the Western Front until the end of the War, and Beckton returned to Australia on 25 March 1919.

== Football ==
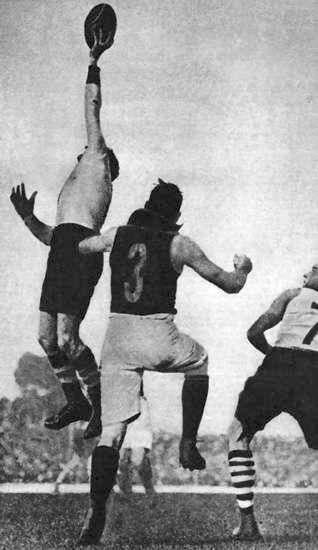
Roy Cazaly taking a one-handed mark. Beckton is the player directly behind him, wearing number 3.

A ruckman, Beckton was recruited from Victorian Football Association (VFA) club Essendon Association, and made his senior VFL debut for Essendon in Round 1 of the 1921 season, against Melbourne at the East Melbourne Cricket Ground, kicking two goals.

Beckton played in the Essendon premierships of 1923 and 1924, won Essendon's best and fairest in 1928 and captained Essendon in 1929 and 1930. He also represented Victoria during his career.

In the famous photo of Roy Cazaly taking a one-handed mark, Beckton is the opposition player seen from behind. Seeing the mark, Beckton asked Cazaly "How the fuck did you do that?"

Following the end of his VFL career, Beckton captain-coached Sandringham in the VFA, playing 74 games and kicking 59 goals before his retirement at the end of 1934.
