= Jim Martin (Australian footballer) =

Australian rules footballer (1884–1940)

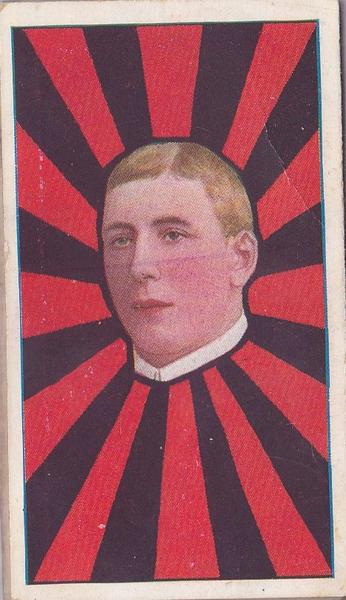
- Cigarette card of Martin in 1911

Personal information
- Full name: James Martin
- Born: 20 August 1884; Carlton, Victoria
- Died: 12 October 1940 (aged 56); Melbourne, Victoria
- Original teams: Devenish, Northcote
- Height: 173 cm (5 ft 8 in)
- Weight: 85 kg (187 lb)
- Position: Forward pocket

Playing career^{1}
| Years | Club | Games (Goals) |
| 1902 | Carlton | 6 (2) |
| 1907–13 | Essendon | 95 (71) |
| 1913–14 | Fitzroy | 27 (16) |
| Total | | 128 (89) |
- ^{1} Playing statistics correct to the end of 1914.

Jim "Bull" Martin (20 August 1884 – 12 October 1940) was an Australian rules footballer who played with Carlton, Essendon and Fitzroy in the Victorian Football League (VFL).

== Football ==
Martin played mostly as a forward, often in the pocket. He only made six appearances for Carlton in his debut season and the following year switched to Northcote.

A strongly built and physical player, Martin returned to the league in 1907, with Essendon, playing there for the next seven years. Despite only kicking 16 goals in 1907, it was enough to top the goal-kicking at Essendon. He played in Essendon's losing 1908 Grand Final side.

He missed out on their 1911 premiership when he received a twelve-week suspension mid-season for striking George Holden of Fitzroy. Police later charged Martin with assault, making him the first VFL player to appear before the courts over an on-field incident.

After playing in Essendon's 1912 premiership team he crossed to Fitzroy's during the 1913 season and participated in another premiership. This made him the first person in VFL history to play in consecutive premierships at two clubs, a feat later equaled by only Tom Fitzmaurice.

== Death ==
Jim Martin died in Royal Melbourne Hospital in 1940.
