= Len Webster =

Australian rules footballer (born 1906)

Personal information
- Full name: Len M. Webster
- Born: 26 December 1906
- Died: 7 October 1985 (aged 78)
- Original team: Blackwood Forest / Loch
- Height: 180 cm (5 ft 11 in)
- Weight: 100 kg (220 lb)
- Position: Ruckman

Playing career^{1}
Years	Club	Games (Goals)
1927–1938	Essendon	145 (100)
- ^{1} Playing statistics correct to the end of 1938.

Len Webster (26 December 1906 – 7 October 1985) was an Australian rules footballer who played with Essendon in the Victorian Football League (VFL).

Webster, a fireman by profession, was a ruckman for Blackwood Forest and Loch before joining Essendon.

He had an early setback in 1930 when he required surgery to remove cartilage in his knee but recovered well enough to play 15 of a possible 18 games in 1931.

Essendon appointed him vice-captain in 1935 and the following season he represented Victoria for a second time, having previously played for his state in 1929. He was captain of Essendon for the entire 1938 VFL season.

Despite making 145 appearances for Essendon, Webster never played in a single final.
