= Tom Reynolds (footballer) =

Australian rules footballer

Personal information
- Full name: Thomas Partridge Reynolds
- Born: 21 November 1917; Essendon, Victoria
- Died: 7 November 2002 (aged 84); Essendon, Victoria
- Original team: Flemington-Kensington
- Height: 180 cm (5 ft 11 in)
- Weight: 85 kg (187 lb)

Playing career^{1}
Years	Club	Games (Goals)
1937–1944	Essendon	109 (361)
1945	St Kilda	4 (8)
Total		113 (369)
- ^{1} Playing statistics correct to the end of 1945.

Career highlights
- Essendon premiership player: 1942

Thomas Partridge Reynolds (21 November 1917 – 7 November 2002), was an Australian rules footballer who played with Essendon in the VFL.

== Family ==
The son of William Meader Reynolds (1886—1940) and Mary James Reynolds, née Thompson (1885—1941), and one of seven children, Thomas Partridge Reynolds was born on 21 November 1917. He died on 7 November 2002. He was the brother of three times Brownlow Medal winner Dick Reynolds and the cousin of Richmond champion player and coach Max Oppy.

== Essendon ==
Reynolds was a forward and kicked more than 50 goals in a season on 4 occasions — Essendon's leading goalkicker each time — with his 71 goals in 1939 (his best season) including 10 goals in the round 10 (24 June 1939) high scoring match against Hawthorn, at Windy Hill (Essendon 19.11 (125) to Hawthorn 16.19 (115)).

His end of season tally was a club record until passed by John Coleman a decade later.

== St Kilda ==
Having transferred from Essendon to St Kilda, Reynolds played four matches (rounds 4, 5, 6, and 7) and kicked 8 goals for St Kilda, before transferring to Sandringham in June 1945.

== Sandringham ==
Although interested in playing with Brunswick, he transferred to Sandringham in June 1945, playing his first game (at full-forward) on 30 June 1945, where he kicked two goals and was one of Sandringham's best players. He played for Sandringham in the 1945 season; in all, he played in 8 matches and scored 18 goals.

== Cranbourne ==
Given a clearance from Sandringham, Reynolds was appointed captain-coach of Cranbourne, in the Dandenong District Football Association in 1946. He retired at the end of the 1947 season.
