= Charlie Payne =

Australian rules footballer

Personal information
- Born: 13 November 1944 (age 81)
- Original team: Terang (HFL)
- Height: 187 cm (6 ft 2 in)
- Weight: 89 kg (196 lb)

Playing career^{1}
| Years | Club | Games (Goals) |
| 1962–1972 | Essendon | 184 (128) |
| 1973-1977 | North Adelaide | 52 (94) |
| Total | | 236 (222) |
- ^{1} Playing statistics correct to the end of 1972.

Charles James Payne (born 13 November 1944) is a former Australian rules footballer who played for Essendon in the VFL.

Payne started his VFL career in 1962 as a forward, at the age of just 17, topping Essendon's goalkicking in his first two seasons, with 39 and 36 goals respectively. He was at full-forward in Essendon's 1962 premiership side but played in the back pocket in their premiership three years later. He would remain in defence for most of his career but was also used as a follower. At the end of the 1972 season he left Essendon and joined North Adelaide for which he played 52 games (94 goals) during the next four seasons.
