= Garnet Campbell =

Australian rules footballer, born 1903

Personal information
- Full name: Harry Garnet Campbell
- Born: 31 July 1903; Footscray, Victoria
- Died: 23 January 1981 (aged 77); Reservoir, Victoria
- Original team: Yarraville
- Height: 175 cm (5 ft 9 in)
- Weight: 70 kg (154 lb)
- Position: Centre/Wingman

Playing career^{1}
| Years | Club | Games (Goals) |
| 1923–1933 | Essendon | 157 (51) |

Coaching career
| Years | Club | Games (W–L–D) |
| 1931–1933 | Essendon | 54 (22–32–0) |
- ^{1} Playing statistics correct to the end of 1933.

Harry Garnet Campbell (31 July 1903 – 23 January 1981) was an Australian rules footballer who played for and coached Essendon in the Victorian Football League (VFL).

== Football ==
Campbell, noted for his strong disposal skills and pace, was best suited as either a centreman or winger. Essendon won Grand Finals in his first two seasons, but he was not a member of their premiership sides, finding it hard to break into the team initially. He was a regular from 1925 onwards and in the 1926 Brownlow Medal count finished as Essendon's highest vote getter and equal fifth overall. Campbell, who represented Victoria at the 1927 Melbourne Carnival, was appointed captain-coach of Essendon in 1931 but his stint and VFL career ended in 1933 when they finished with the wooden spoon. He finished his career as Sandringham's captain-coach.

== See also ==
- 1927 Melbourne Carnival
