= Wayne Primmer =

Australian rules footballer

Personal information
- Full name: Wayne Primmer
- Born: 9 January 1959 (age 67)
- Original team: Woomelang
- Height: 175 cm (5 ft 9 in)
- Weight: 65 kg (143 lb)

Playing career^{1}
Years	Club	Games (Goals)
1977–1979	Essendon	40 (74)
- ^{1} Playing statistics correct to the end of 1979.

Wayne Primmer (born 9 January 1959) is a former professional Australian rules footballer who played with Essendon in the Victorian Football League (VFL) and West Torrens in the South Australian National Football League (SANFL).

Recruited from Woomelang, Primmer was a rover and had a particularly strong season in 1978, where he kicked 24 goals in his first six appearances that year, with seven goal hauls against South Melbourne, Carlton and Richmond. By the end of the season he had amassed 47 goals, which were enough to top Essendon's goal-kicking.

Primmer transferred to SANFL club West Torrens for the 1980 season, then to Mid-Murray Football League club Lalbert, in 1981 and 1982, the first as captain-coach. In 1983 he joined Hamilton as captain-coach and from 1984 to 1987 he played with Benalla, captain-coaching them in every year except 1986.

Primmer then coached Benalla All Blacks Football Club from 1992 to 1994.

Primmer coached Greta Football Club in the Ovens and King Football League from 2005 to 2007, then later coached Sandhurst in the Bendigo Football League from 2016 to 2018, which included their 2016 premiership!
