= Max Crow =

Australian rules footballer, born 1956

Personal information
- Born: 7 January 1956 (age 70)
- Original team: Underbool
- Debut: Round 7, 1974, Essendon vs. Richmond, at Windy Hill

Playing career^{1}
Years	Club	Games (Goals)
1974–1982	Essendon	136 (139)
1983–1985	St Kilda	40 (53)
1986	Footscray	12 (18)
Total		188 (210)
- ^{1} Playing statistics correct to the end of 1986.

Career highlights
- Essendon Leading goalkicker 1977 (38); St Kilda Best and Fairest 1983

Max Crow (born 7 January 1956) is a former Australian rules footballer in the Victorian Football League.

He played mostly as a key forward or ruckman, he was a good mark and long kick. Recruited from the western Victorian town of Underbool, outside Essendon's recruitment zone, he made his league debut for the Bombers in 1974 and spent a number of years at the club as one of its favourites.

He then crossed to St Kilda in 1983, winning the club's best and fairest award in his first year there, before finishing with one year at Footscray in 1986.
