= Jake Stringer =

Australian rules footballer (born 1994)

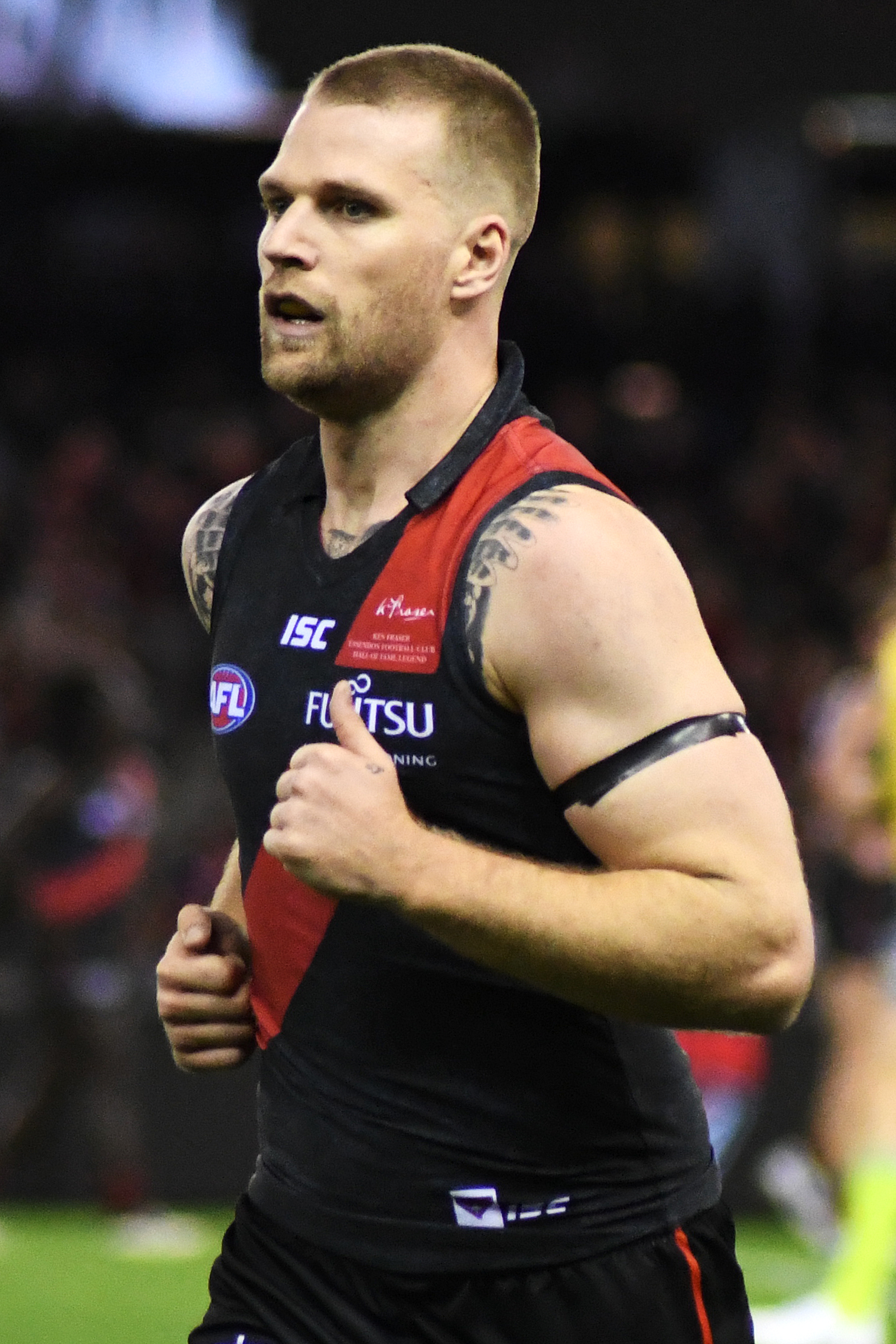
- Stringer playing for Essendon in 2018

Personal information
- Nickname: The Package
- Born: 25 April 1994 (age 32); Maryborough, Victoria
- Original team: Bendigo Gold (VFL)
- Draft: No. 5, 2012 national draft
- Debut: Round 4, 2013, Western Bulldogs vs. Adelaide, at AAMI Stadium
- Height: 192 cm (6 ft 4 in)
- Weight: 92 kg (203 lb)
- Position: Forward

Club information
- Current club: St Kilda

Playing career^{1}
Years	Club	Games (Goals)
2013–2017	Western Bulldogs	89 (160)
2018–2024	Essendon	123 (207)
2025–2026	Greater Western Sydney	38 (73)
2027–	St Kilda	0 (0)
Total		250 (440)

International team honours^{2}
Years	Team	Games (Goals)
2015	Australia	1 (0)
- ^{1} Playing statistics correct to the end of round 24, 2026.^{2} Representative statistics correct as of 2015.

Career highlights
- AFL premiership player: 2016; All-Australian team: 2015; 3× Western Bulldogs leading goalkicker: 2015, 2016, 2017; 3× Essendon leading goalkicker: 2018, 2019, 2021; GWS leading goalkicker: 2026; AFL Rising Star nominee: 2014

Jake Stringer (born 25 April 1994) is a professional Australian rules footballer who currently plays for the St Kilda Football Club in the Australian Football League (AFL). He previously played for the Western Bulldogs from 2013 to 2017, the Essendon Football Club from 2018 to 2024 and the Greater Western Sydney Giants from 2025 to 2026. Stringer was selected in the All-Australian team in 2015 and won an AFL premiership with the Bulldogs in 2016, the club's first in 62 years. He has also led his clubs' goalkicking on seven occasions (three for the Western Bulldogs, three for Essendon and once for Greater Western Sydney).

== Early life ==
Stringer played junior football with the Eaglehawk Football Club and played for the Bendigo Pioneers in the TAC Cup. After suffering a leg fracture in 2011, he was still able to show strong form for the Bendigo Gold in the VFL. He was drafted by the Bulldogs with the fifth overall selection in the 2012 national draft.

== AFL career ==
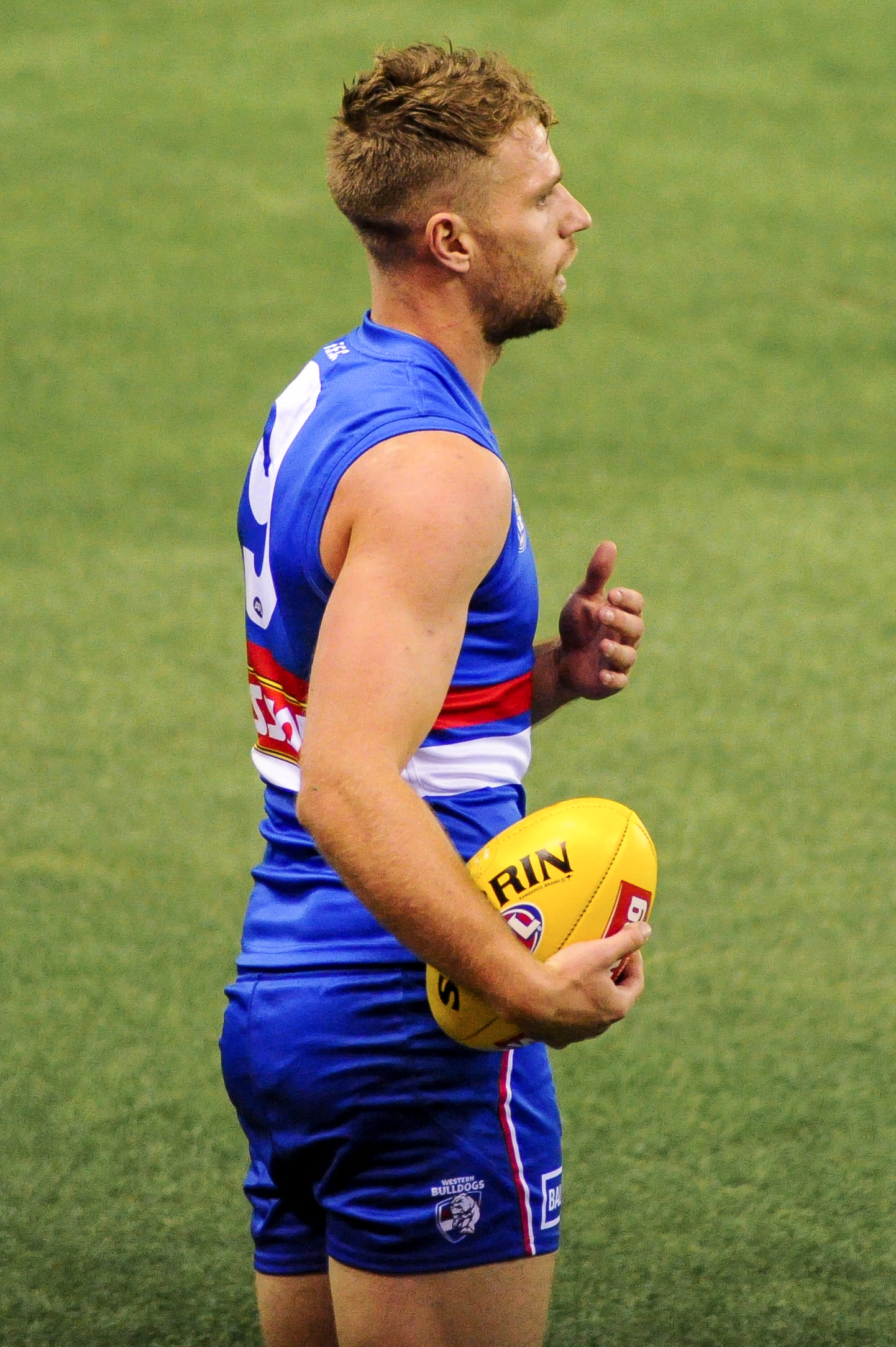
Stringer playing for the Western Bulldogs in 2017

=== Western Bulldogs (2013–2017) ===
Stringer made his AFL debut against Adelaide in round 4 of the 2013 AFL season. In 2014, Stringer's abilities improved dramatically, and he began to be known as "The Package". He received a nomination for the 2014 AFL Rising Star award in round 20 after kicking a match-winning four goals against St Kilda.

In 2015, Stringer had his breakthrough season kicking 56 goals and averaging 14 disposals per game, cementing himself as one of the competition's most exciting young players. Stringer also played every game in the 2015 season except for one. His outstanding season was capped off with an All-Australian selection. He later represented Australia in the 2015 International Rules game.

In 2016, Stringer struggled with form which led to him being dropped at the end of the Home and Away season. Despite the inconsistent form, Stringer still kicked the most goals for the Bulldogs that year, 37. Stringer returned for the Bulldogs elimination Final against the Eagles, kicking one goal in the Bulldogs 47 point thrashing of the Eagles at Domain Stadium. He then played in the Dogs 23 point win over Hawthorn, contributing immensely kicking 3 goals. In the final minute of the Preliminary Final when the Dogs were leading by just 5 points, Stringer had the ball inside the attacking 50 and instead of having a shot for goal he crossed to teammate Tory Dickson. Dickson was then able to take time off the clock and then shoot just after the siren was called. This act of selflessness by Stringer helped slow down play and landed the Bulldogs into their first Grand Final in 55 years. In the 2016 AFL Grand Final the Bulldogs took on the minor premiers, Sydney Swans. Stringer had a quiet game, but kicked an important goal in the final term to stretch the Dogs lead over Sydney. The Bulldogs defeated Sydney by 22 points and won their 2nd Premiership in the club's history. On 14 April 2017, Stringer made history by kicking the first-ever AFL goal on a Good Friday.

=== Essendon (2018–2024) ===
Stringer was contracted until the end of the 2018 season, but at the end of the 2017 season Bulldogs coach Luke Beveridge confirmed that the club was looking to trade him. He was officially traded to Essendon during the trade period.

At Essendon, he regained his form and won the club's goal kicking award three times. After 4 seasons at the club and following a blistering run of form through the middle rounds of 2021, Stringer signed on with the club for a further 3 seasons. Leading into the opening round of the 2022 season, Stringer was ruled out after failing to overcome a groin injury.

Stringer had a strong 2024 season, playing every game for the Bombers and kicking 42 goals. Stringer's strong season triggered a clause in his contract to extend his contract with Essendon until 2025. However, Stringer was seeking a longer extension than that, which Essendon refused to offer him. This led to trade speculation linking Stringer with a move away from Essendon.

=== Greater Western Sydney (2025–2026) ===
During the 2024 trade period, he was traded to Greater Western Sydney in exchange for pick 53.

In his first season for GWS, Stringer played 15 games, including their Elimination Final loss to Hawthorn. He missed games due to hamstring strains over three separate periods. Despite these setbacks, he featured in some important late-season wins, kicking 10 goals across Rds 18–20 and receiving coaches' votes in all three games.

Stringer was delisted at the end of the 2025 AFL season, though he was re-listed by the Giants, after being selected with the 59th pick in the 2025 national draft. In 2026, Stringer silenced critics with the second-best goal scoring season of his career. Despite this, he left GWS at the end of the season, expressing a desire to return to Victoria.

== Statistics ==
Updated to the end of the 2026 season.

Legend
G	Goals	K	Kicks	D	Disposals	T	Tackles
B	Behinds	H	Handballs	M	Marks
#	Played in that season's premiership team

Season	Team	No.	Games	Totals							Averages (per game)							Votes
Season	Team	No.	Games	G	B	K	H	D	M	T	G	B	K	H	D	M	T	Votes
2013	Western Bulldogs	9	10	12	7	47	37	84	31	20	1.2	0.7	4.7	3.7	8.4	3.1	2.0	0
2014	Western Bulldogs	9	18	26	15	133	87	220	55	43	1.4	0.8	7.4	4.8	12.2	3.1	2.4	0
2015	Western Bulldogs	9	22	56	32	236	78	314	77	59	2.5	1.5	10.7	3.5	14.3	3.5	2.7	3
2016^{#}	Western Bulldogs	9	23	42	23	182	141	323	77	48	1.8	1.0	7.9	6.1	14.0	3.3	2.1	4
2017	Western Bulldogs	9	16	24	26	124	74	198	48	29	1.5	1.6	7.8	4.6	12.4	3.0	1.8	3
2018	Essendon	25	20	30	23	191	100	291	74	53	1.5	1.2	9.6	5.0	14.6	3.7	2.7	1
2019	Essendon	25	19	33	27	178	55	233	57	63	1.7	1.4	9.4	2.9	12.3	3.0	3.3	2
2020 (Note: The 2020 season was played with 17 home-and-away matches per team (down from 22) and 16-minute quarters with time on (down from 20-minute quarters with time on) due to the impact of the COVID-19 pandemic.)	Essendon	25	10	15	7	57	16	73	18	19	1.5	0.7	5.7	1.6	7.3	1.8	1.9	2
2021	Essendon	25	19	41	18	210	102	312	55	76	2.2	0.9	11.1	5.4	16.4	2.9	4.0	8
2022	Essendon	25	15	25	19	136	60	196	33	45	1.7	1.3	9.1	4.0	13.1	2.2	3.0	2
2023	Essendon	25	17	21	23	145	83	228	45	51	1.2	1.4	8.5	4.9	13.4	2.6	3.0	3
2024	Essendon	25	23	42	25	203	88	291	89	58	1.8	1.1	8.8	3.8	12.7	3.9	2.5	1
2025	Greater Western Sydney	20	15	25	24	108	51	159	40	23	1.7	1.6	7.2	3.4	10.6	2.7	1.5	0
2026	Greater Western Sydney	20	23	48	45	202	70	272	86	48	2.1	2.0	8.8	3.0	11.8	3.7	2.1	6
Career			250	440	314	2152	1042	3194	785	635	1.8	1.3	8.6	4.2	12.8	3.1	2.5	35

== Honours and achievements ==
Team

- AFL premiership player (Western Bulldogs): 2016

Individual

- All-Australian team: 2015
- 3× Western Bulldogs leading goalkicker: 2015, 2016, 2017
- 3× Essendon leading goalkicker: 2018, 2019, 2021
- AFL Rising Star nominee: 2014
