= Ted Fordham =

Australian rules footballer

Personal information
- Full name: Ted A. Fordham
- Born: 3 May 1940 (age 86)
- Original team: Essendon Baptists
- Height: 185 cm (6 ft 1 in)
- Weight: 86 kg (190 lb)

Playing career^{1}
Years	Club	Games (Goals)
1961–1969	Essendon	128 (214)
- ^{1} Playing statistics correct to the end of 1969.

Ted Fordham (born 3 May 1940) is a former Australian rules footballer who played for Essendon in the Victorian Football League (VFL). He was the VFL's leading goalkicker in the 1966 season.

Debuting in 1961, Fordham played as a half-back flanker and follower during the early stages of his career. Later in the 1964 season, he moved to full-forward, under the instruction of John Coleman. He helped Essendon win the premiership the following season with six goals in the preliminary final and then kicked a record-equalling seven goals in the grand final against St Kilda.

== VFL statistics ==
Legend
G	Goals	K	Kicks	D	Disposals	T	Tackles
B	Behinds	H	Handballs	M	Marks

Led the league for the season only
Led the league after finals only
Led the league after season and finals

Season	Team	No.	Games	Totals							Averages (per game)						
Season	Team	No.	Games	G	B	K	H	D	M	T	G	B	K	H	D	M	T
1961	Essendon	20	10	3	—N/a	—N/a	—N/a	—N/a	—N/a	—N/a	0.3	—N/a	—N/a	—N/a	—N/a	—N/a	—N/a
1962	Essendon	20	5	0	—N/a	—N/a	—N/a	—N/a	—N/a	—N/a	0.0	—N/a	—N/a	—N/a	—N/a	—N/a	—N/a
1963	Essendon	20	14	7	—N/a	—N/a	—N/a	—N/a	—N/a	—N/a	0.5	—N/a	—N/a	—N/a	—N/a	—N/a	—N/a
1964	Essendon	20	16	25	—N/a	—N/a	—N/a	—N/a	—N/a	—N/a	1.6	—N/a	—N/a	—N/a	—N/a	—N/a	—N/a
1965	Essendon	20	20	54	56	200	18	218	108	—N/a	2.7	2.8	10.0	0.9	10.9	5.4	—N/a
1966	Essendon	20	20	76	55	211	21	232	106	—N/a	3.8	2.8	10.6	1.1	11.6	5.3	—N/a
1967	Essendon	20	15	25	30	162	20	182	79	—N/a	1.7	2.0	10.8	1.3	12.1	5.3	—N/a
1968	Essendon	20	22	22	20	350	75	425	132	—N/a	1.0	0.9	15.9	3.4	19.3	6.0	—N/a
1969	Essendon	20	6	2	5	75	20	95	27	—N/a	0.3	0.8	12.5	3.3	15.8	4.5	—N/a
Career			128	214	166	998	154	1152	452	—N/a	1.7	2.0	12.0	1.9	13.9	5.4	—N/a
