= Norm Hall (footballer) =

Australian rules footballer

Personal information
- Full name: Norman Henry Hall
- Born: 28 November 1894; Oakleigh, Victoria
- Died: 19 November 1974 (aged 79); Rosebud, Victoria
- Original team: Melbourne Grammar
- Height: 175 cm (5 ft 9 in)

Playing career^{1}
Years	Club	Games (Goals)
1913–1914, 1918	Essendon	13 (17)
- ^{1} Playing statistics correct to the end of 1918.

Norman Henry Hall (28 November 1894 – 19 November 1974) was an Australian rules footballer who played with Essendon in the Victorian Football League (VFL).

Hall, a forward, was a nephew of Test cricketer and VFL coach Jack Worrall.

Recruited from Melbourne Grammar, Hall made one appearance for Essendon in 1913 and two in 1914, before being cleared to Collegians.

In 1918 he returned to Essendon and kicked 15 goals that year, to top the club's goal-kicking.
