= Ray Powell (Australian footballer) =

Australian rules footballer

Personal information
- Full name: Harold Raymond Powell
- Born: 7 August 1923; Moonee Ponds, Victoria
- Died: 7 July 1993 (aged 69)
- Original team: Essendon Stars
- Height: 178 cm (5 ft 10 in)
- Weight: 70 kg (154 lb)

Playing career^{1}
Years	Club	Games (Goals)
1942–1947	Essendon	49 (69)
- ^{1} Playing statistics correct to the end of 1947.

Harold Raymond Powell (7 August 1923 – 7 July 1993) was an Australian rules footballer who played with Essendon in the Victorian Football League (VFL).

Powell was a utility player, often featuring as a half forward flanker. He only twice played more than half the game in a season, with 16 appearances in 1944, followed by 14 games in 1945. His 43 goals in 1944, five of them in the finals, were enough to top Essendon's goal-kicking.

Powell played for Victorian Football Association (VFA club Brunswick from 1947 to 1949 and was then coach of Ascot Vale.
