= Graham Willey =

Australian rules footballer (1933–2021)

Personal information
- Full name: Graham John Willey
- Born: 19 July 1933
- Died: 10 February 2021 (aged 87); Geelong, Victoria
- Original team: Redan
- Height: 188 cm (6 ft 2 in)
- Weight: 89 kg (196 lb)
- Position: Forward

Playing career^{1}
Years	Club	Games (Goals)
1955–1956	Essendon	17 (35)
- ^{1} Playing statistics correct to the end of 19567.

Graham John Willey (19 July 1933 – 10 February 2021) was an Australian rules footballer who played with Essendon in the Victorian Football League (VFL).

Willey, who was a student at Scotch College, made his debut for Essendon in 1955, while on a permit from Redan. That year he won the best and fairest award, the Henderson Medal in the Ballarat Football League. He joined the club full-time in 1956 and kicked 33 goals from 16 games, to top Essendon's goal-kicking.

His work as a metallurgist brought him to Broken Hill in 1957 and he played with the North Broken Hill Football Club until 1960. He coached South Broken Hill to a premiership in 1962.
