= Alan Noonan =

Australian rules footballer

Personal information
- Full name: Alan John Noonan
- Born: 13 October 1947; Ballarat, Victoria
- Died: 13 April 2011 (aged 63)
- Original team: Warragul (LVFL)
- Height: 188 cm (6 ft 2 in)
- Weight: 92 kg (203 lb)

Playing career^{1}
Years	Club	Games (Goals)
1966–1976	Essendon	182 (420)
1977	Richmond	10 (14)
Total		192 (434)
- ^{1} Playing statistics correct to the end of 1977.

Career highlights
- Essendon leading goalkicker: 1967–69, 1971, 1973–75; Interstate games: 7

Alan John Noonan (13 October 1947 – 13 April 2011) was an Australian rules footballer who played in the Victorian Football League (VFL) for the Essendon Football Club from 1966 to 1976 and the Richmond Football Club in 1977.

Noonan grew up in Warragul. He made his VFL debut in 1966 and in his 11-year career for Essendon kicked 420 goals and played 183 games. In 1974 he kicked 77 goals, one of seven times he topped Essendon's goalkicking.

== Essendon Football Club Committee ==
Noonan holds the record for the Essendon Football Club's shortest ever term as a committeeman. In the 1992 club election, he was elected to the committee. Within a couple of days, 50 "lost" votes were found, a recount was conducted and, with 18 of the votes for Noonan declared invalid, Barry J. Keam (who served on the Essendon Football Club Committee from 1976 to 1995) was restored to his place on the committee.

Noonan later served on the Essendon Football Club Committee as vice-president from 1994 to 1995.

== After football ==
Noonan was a teacher whose career extended from the 1970s to the 2010s. His schools included Aberfeldie, Pascoe Vale South and Roxburgh Homestead Primary Schools. He coached the football teams at all his schools.

== Death ==
Noonan died on 13 April 2011 after a long battle with cancer, aged 63.
