= Ted Bryce =

Australian rules footballer

Personal information
- Full name: Edward George Bryce
- Born: 21 December 1912; South Melbourne, Victoria
- Died: 10 October 1996 (aged 83)
- Original team: South Melbourne Districts
- Height: 168 cm (5 ft 6 in)
- Weight: 80 kg (176 lb)

Playing career^{1}
Years	Club	Games (Goals)
1935–1942	Essendon	106 (125)
- ^{1} Playing statistics correct to the end of 1942.

Edward George Bryce (21 December 1912 – 10 October 1996) was an Australian rules footballer who played with Essendon in the Victorian Football League (VFL).

Bryce was used up forward with success later in his career, but started out as a wingman and also played as a rover. He was the son of former Collingwood and South Melbourne player Bob Bryce. His brother, George Bryce, also competed for South Melbourne.

He missed the end of the 1936 VFL season and most of 1937, after he received an 18-week suspension for kicking Carltons Norm Cashin.

In 1938, his first full season back, he became a VFL interstate representative for the first time.

Bryce missed another five games through suspension in 1939.

He was Essendon's leading goal-kicker in 1940, when he kicked 48 goals. His record in finals saw him kick 16 goals from just six game. He kicked two of those goals from a forward pocket in the 1941 VFL Grand Final, which Essendon lost.
