= Frank McDonald (footballer) =

Australian rules footballer

Personal information
- Full name: Francis Joseph McDonald
- Nickname: Red
- Born: 21 September 1899; Allendale, Victoria
- Died: 28 May 1962 (aged 62); Coburg, Victoria
- Original team: Footscray (VFA)
- Height: 177 cm (5 ft 10 in)
- Position: Full-forward

Playing career^{1}
| Years | Club | Games (Goals) |
| 1919–1921 | Essendon | 28 (56) |
- ^{1} Playing statistics correct to the end of 1921.

Francis Joseph "Frank" McDonald (21 September 1899 – 28 May 1962) was an Australian rules footballer who played with Essendon in the Victorian Football League (VFL).

== Family ==
The son of John Thomas McDonald (1863–1929), and Margaret Mary McDonald (1860–1936), née O'Brien, Francis Joseph McDonald was born at Allendale, Victoria, on 21 September 1899; and, although his birth was registered as "Simon McDonald", throughout his life he was always known as "Francis Joseph McDonald".

He married Ilma Magdalen Laffy (1900–1955) in 1926.

== Football ==
A full-forward, McDonald averaged two goals a game in his three seasons at Essendon. Recruited from the Victorian Football Association (VFA) team Footscray, his first appearance for Essendon, in round 10 of the 1919 VFL season, was also the last of his brother Paddy's nine games for Essendon.

McDonald twice won Essendon's leading goalkicker award (now known as the Matthew Lloyd Medal). The first was in 1920, when he kicked 33 goals from only 11 games. This included a seven-goal haul against Geelong. He topped the goal-kicking again the following year, 1921, with 17 goals in 10 games.

He captain-coached Hamilton in 1922 and 1923. During the 1920s he also spent some time in charge of South Ballarat.

== Death ==
He died (suddenly) at the Sacred Heart Hospital in Moreland Road, Coburg, on 28 May 1962.
