= Lou Armstrong =

Australian rules footballer

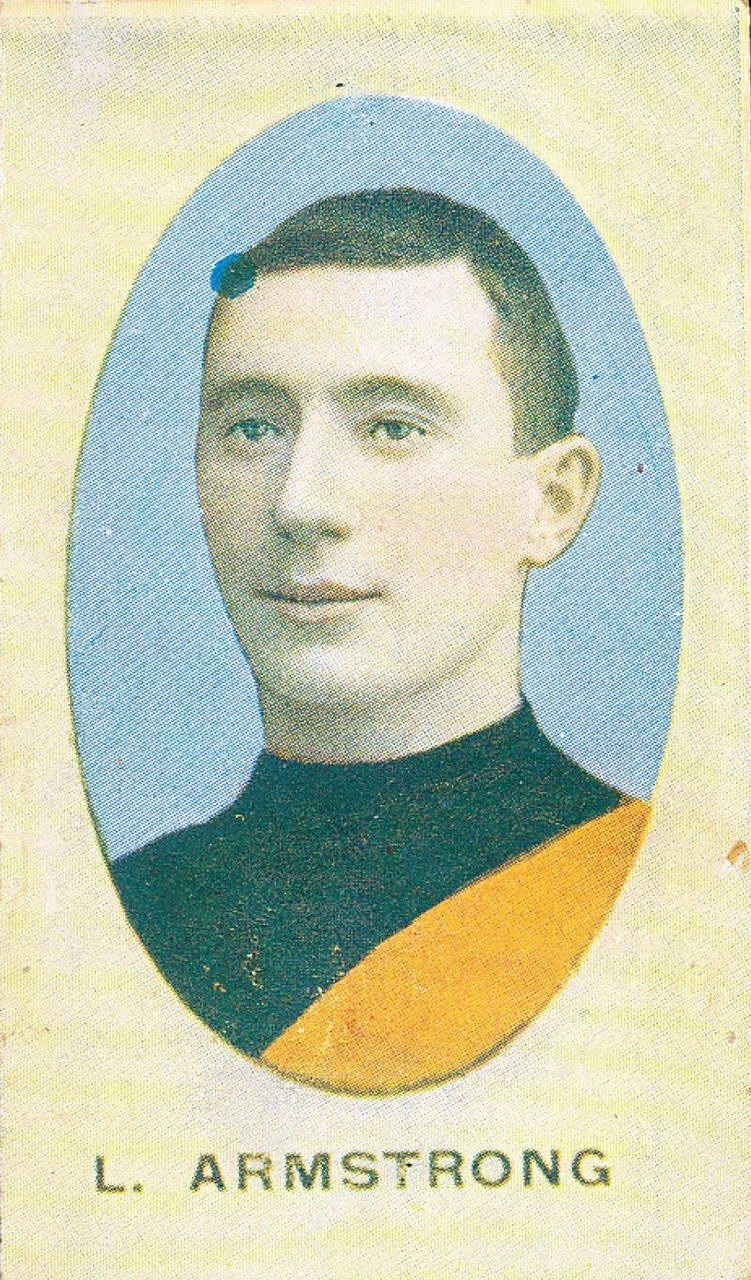
- Cigaretter card of Armstrong in 1910

Personal information
- Full name: Lewis Edward Armstrong
- Born: 8 February 1885; Sandhurst, Victoria
- Died: 30 August 1926 (aged 41); Carlton, Victoria
- Original team: West Melbourne (VFA)
- Height: 170 cm (5 ft 7 in)
- Weight: 70 kg (154 lb)

Playing career^{1}
Years	Club	Games (Goals)
1908–1914	Essendon	107 (109)
- ^{1} Playing statistics correct to the end of 1914.

Career highlights
- VFL premiership player: 1911

Lewis Edward Armstrong (8 February 1885 – 30 August 1926) was an Australian rules footballer who played with Essendon in the Victorian Football League (VFL).

Armstrong started his career at West Melbourne and in 1906 was a member of their only Victorian Football Association (VFA) premiership. They merged with North Melbourne in 1907 and in 1908 he joined Essendon. Although built like a rover, he often played as a key position forward. He topped their goalkicking in 1911 with 35 goals and played in their premiership that year as well as the following season. During the 1914 season he transferred to back to the VFA where he played for Essendon Association.
