= Mick Madden (Australian footballer) =

Australian rules footballer and umpire

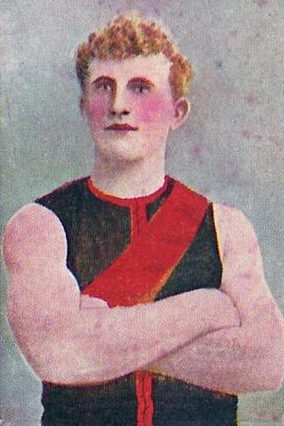
- Cigarette card of Madden in 1905

Personal information
- Full name: Michael Thomas Madden
- Born: 21 June 1882; Redesdale, Victoria
- Died: 21 September 1943 (aged 61); St Kilda, Victoria
- Original team: Heathcote
- Height: 174 cm (5 ft 9 in)
- Weight: 87 kg (192 lb)
- Position: Forward

Playing career^{1}
Years	Club	Games (Goals)
1903–06	Essendon	65 (51)
- ^{1} Playing statistics correct to the end of 1906.

Michael Thomas Madden (21 June 1882 – 21 September 1943) was an Australian rules footballer who played with Essendon in the Victorian Football League (VFL).

== Football ==
"Mick Madden was famous for his very light curly hair and his tremendous hands – he could pick up a football one-handed, not by the tapered end but at Its widest girth." – "Old Boy", The Australasian, 17 August 1940.

=== Essendon (VFL ===
Madden, who joined Essendon from Heathcote, was a forward and topped their goal-kicking twice. The first instance was in 1903 with 15 goals and the second came the following season after kicking 25 goals. Madden contested finals in three of his four seasons but never made it into the premiership decider.

=== Essendon A (VFA) ===
The red haired Madden, nicknamed "Mad Mick", transferred to Victorian Football Association (VFA) club Essendon Association in 1907.

During his time at Essendon Association he had to sit out of action for a year after receiving a suspension for abusing an umpire. He contested the ban in court and the judge sided with him but the VFA still refused to lift their suspension. Madden returned in time to help Essendon Association become league premiers in 1912, and retired from playing in 1915.

== Umpire ==
The final chapter of Madden's football career was spent as a boundary and goal umpire. He started in the VFA and umpired the 1921 Grand Final, which was abandoned midway through due to hail, some of which had struck Madden, requiring stitches in his scalp. In 1923 he umpired his first VFL match and before retiring in 1929, he had officiated in 93 matches, including the 1928 Grand Final.

== Sources ==
- Atkinson, G. (1982) Everything you ever wanted to know about Australian rules football but couldn't be bothered asking, The Five Mile Press: Melbourne. ISBN 0 86788 009 0.
