= Ernie Cameron =

Australian rules footballer

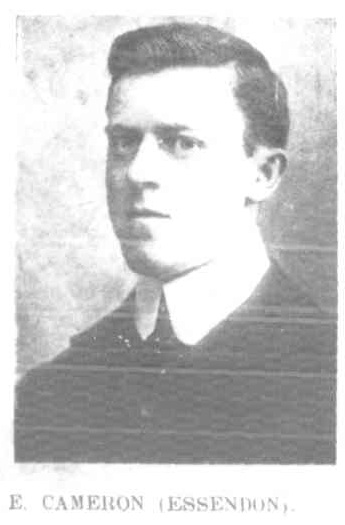
- Cameron in 1907

Personal information
- Full name: Ernest James Cameron
- Born: 20 February 1888; North Melbourne, Victoria
- Died: 16 December 1946 (aged 58); Geelong, Victoria
- Original team: St Mary's (VMFL)
- Height: 173 cm (5 ft 8 in)
- Weight: 71 kg (157 lb)

Playing career^{1}
Years	Club	Games (Goals)
1905–1912	Essendon	114 (55)
- ^{1} Playing statistics correct to the end of 1912.

Ernest James "Ginger" Cameron (20 February 1888 – 16 December 1946) was an Australian rules footballer who played with Essendon in the Victorian Football League (VFL). He was a premiership player for the club in 1911.

A rover, nicknamed "Ginger", he made his debut for Essendon in 1905. Cameron was a back-to-back Best and Fairest winner for Essendon, winning the award in 1911 and 1912. After breaking his leg during the 1912 finals series he was forced to retire from the game at just 23.

Cameron played district cricket for North Melbourne, and in 1919 he was the manager of the Australian Imperial Force Touring XI on its tour of England.
