= Ted Freyer =

Australian rules footballer, born 1910

Personal information
- Full name: Edward Laurence Freyer
- Nickname: Nipper
- Born: 20 May 1910; Port Melbourne, Victoria
- Died: 22 May 1984 (aged 74); Smeaton, Victoria
- Original team: Port Melbourne (VFA))
- Height: 185 cm (6 ft 1 in)
- Weight: 76 kg (168 lb)

Playing career^{1}
| Years | Club | Games (Goals) |
| 1928–1929, 1938–1941 & 1945 | Port Melbourne | 83 (463) |
| 1929–1937 | Essendon | 124 (372) |
- ^{1} Playing statistics correct to the end of 1945.

Career highlights
- 2x VFA leading goalkicker: 1938, 1940; 5x Essendon leading goalkicker: 1931, 1932, 1933, 1934, 1936; Essendon Most Serviceable Player: 1934

Edward Laurence Freyer (20 May 1910 – 22 April 1984) was an Australian rules footballer who played with Essendon in the VFL during the 1930s.

== Family ==
The sixth of the seven children of Peter Henry Freyer (1869–1945) and Mary Freyer (1871–1928), née Suffolk, Edward Laurence Freyer was born at Port Melbourne, Victoria, on 20 May 1910.

He married Elsie Olivia Holmes (1911–2001) in 1930.

His brother, Bill Freyer, played VFL football with South Melbourne and Footscray in the mid-1920s, and his son, Robert Alan Freyer (1937–2011), played for Port Melbourne in the VFA between 1958 and 1965.

== Football ==
=== Essendon (VFL) ===
Freyer usually played in the forward pocket and topped Essendon's goalkicking in consecutive seasons from 1931 until 1934 and again in 1936.

He kicked 12 goals in one match in 1935 — he kicked 12.1 (73) against Melbourne, at the MCG, on 27 April 1935 — 8 goals once (1934), 7 goals four times (1931, 1934, 1935, and 1937), and 6 goals seven times (1931 (twice), 1933, 1936 (3 times), and 1937).

=== Port Melbourne (VFA) ===
In 1938, Freyer transferred Port Melbourne in the VFA without a clearance, at the start of the VFA's throw-pass era. He was a prolific goalkicker at Port Melbourne, and in 84 games managed 464 goals. In 1940, Freyer kicked 157 goals for Port, including 12 goals in the second semi-final and the Grand Final, to lead the VFA goalkicking for the season.

== Military service ==
He served with the Australian Army in New Guinea in World War Two.

== Death ==
He died at Smeaton, Victoria, on 22 April 1984.
