= Keilor Football Club =

Australian rules football club

Keilor

Names
- Full name: Keilor Football Club
- Nickname: Blues

2025 Senior Men's season
- After finals: Runners Up
- Home-and-away season: 1st

Club details
- Founded: 1877; 149 years ago
- Colours: Blue; Red; White
- Competition: Essendon District Football League
- President: Craig Hill
- Coach: Seniors: Mick McGuane; Reserves: Stephen Pace; Women's: Brooke Surgeon
- Premierships: KBFL (2); 1926; 1928; EDFL A/Premier Div.: (12); 1973; 1985; 1988; 1995; 1996; 1997; 2000; 2001; 2008; 2016; 2019; 2024; EDFL B/Div. 1 (1); 1968; EDFL Reserves (12); 1987; 1989; 1990; 1995; 1999; 2000; 2001; 2005; 2008; 2015; 2016; 2023; 2024; WREDWFL: (1); 2017
- Ground: Joe Brown Oval - Keilor Recreation Reserve, Keilor, Victoria

Uniforms
Home	Away

Other information
- Official website: keilorfc.com.au

The Keilor Football Club, nicknamed the Blues, is an Australian rules football club located in Keilor, Victoria, north west of Melbourne. The club originated in 1877, formed at a general meeting at the Waggoner's Arms Hotel. In 1926, the club became a founding member of the Keilor and Broadmeadows Football League, winning premierships in 1926 and 1928. Since 1932, the club has competed in the Essendon District Football League and today fields teams in the Premier Division (seniors), Reserves Premier Division and Women's Premier Division, as well as a number of junior squads.

The club's home games are held at the Keilor Recreation Reserve, which also houses the club's administrative headquarters and is the base for the Keilor Cricket Club.

== History ==
Between 1877 and 1926, the club played a series of exhibition games against various Melbourne sides, including a win against a senior Hotham side that would later place third in the inaugural Victorian Football Association season. In 1926, the club was a founding member of the Keilor and Broadmeadows Football League, winning the inaugural premiership and a second grand final in 1928.

In 1932, the club defected to the Essendon District Football League (EDFL), but had limited success until 1968, winning its first premiership in the B Grade in a side led by player-coach Norm McKenzie. Subsequently, the club was promoted into the A Grade – now the Premier Division – where it has remained since. In 1973, the side won its first A Grade premiership, and also triumphed in first grade grand finals in 1985, 1988, 1995, 1996, 1997, 2000 and 2001.

In 2008, former Collingwood and Carlton footballer Mick McGuane was appointed as senior coach. In the 2008 season, the club's A Grade, Reserves and Under-18 sides all featured in their respective grand finals at Windy Hill, with the A Grade taking out the premiership in a 33 points win over Greenvale, who had been undefeated since the 2006 preliminary final. The club's reserves side defeated West Coburg, while the under-18s side were unsuccessful in their match.

With a further reserves team premiership in 2015, both the senior and reserves sides featured in grand finals – now competing in the Premier Division and Reserves Premier Division respectively. In the Premier Division final, Keilor kicked 8 goals to 3 in the opening term to defeat Aberfeldie 13.13 (91) to 9.8 (62) and secure the club's 10th first grade premiership. The reserves side also prevailed, defeating Greenvale 14.8 (92) to 10.9 (69) to win their 11th reserves title.

In 2019, for the first time in the club's history, its Premier Division side achieved both the minor premiership and the premiership, winning 20 games in a row and defeating Aberfeldie 11.9 (75) to 10.7 (67) in the 2019 grand final.

In 2025, the club was found to have breached their salary cap by $605 AUD in the 2022 season and $45,100 AUD in the 2023 season. As a result EDFL committee imposed the club will forfeit the 2023 Senior Men’s Premier Division premiership as well as allowable player payments limit will be reduced by 15 per cent for each of the 2025, 2026 and 2027 football seasons. Keilor FC is fined $50,000 AUD, with $20,000 AUD of that suspended pending compliance by the club with the EDFL Player Payment Rules for the 2025, 2026 and 2027 football seasons.

== Women's team ==
In 2017, the club fielded a senior side in the inaugural Western Region and Essendon District Women's Football League season. The Blues dominated the competition, winning all 13 matches and conceding a mere 63 points, before defeating Manor Lakes by 75 points in the grand final. In 2018, the club fielded two women's teams – the EDFL Women's Premier Division side was narrowly defeated by the Sunbury Lions in the Elimination Final, while in the Northern Football League the Blues suffered a 39-point loss to Bendigo. John Tate stepped down from the role of women's coach in February 2019, and was replaced by Ron Sikora.

== Honours ==
Club premierships
League	Competition	Wins	Year won
Keilor and Broadmeadows Football Association	Keilor and Broadmeadows Football League	2	1926, 1928
Essendon District Football League	Premier Division (A Grade)	12	1973, 1985, 1988, 1995, 1996, 1997, 2000, 2001, 2008, 2016, 2019, 2024
Essendon District Football League	Reserves Premier Division (A Grade Reserves)	12	1987, 1989, 1990, 1995, 1999, 2000, 2001, 2005, 2008, 2015, 2016, 2023, 2024
Essendon District Football League	Division 1 (B Grade)	1	1968
Western Region Football League	Western Regional and Essendon District Women's Football League	1	2017

== VFL/AFL players from Keilor Football Club ==
- George Spero (Essendon)
- John Ellis (Essendon)
- Mark Harvey (Essendon)
- Ricky Olarenshaw (Essendon)
- Shane Huggard (Essendon)
- Ivan Maric (Richmond & Adelaide)
- Michael Rischitelli (Brisbane Lions & Gold Coast)
- Kyle Hartigan (Adelaide)
- James Sicily (Hawthorn)
- Corey Ellis (Richmond)
- Jayden Laverde (Essendon)
- Paul Ahern (Greater Western Sydney & North Melbourne)
- Daniel Venables (West Coast)
- Campbell Gray (Richmond)
