= George Spero =

George Spero may refer to:

- George Spero (politician) (1894–1960), British politician
- George Spero (footballer) (1941–2022), Australian footballer
