= Taylors Lakes Football Club =

Australian rules football club

Taylors Lakes

Names
- Full name: Taylors Lakes Football Club
- Nickname(s): Lions, Lakers

2025 season
- Home-and-away season: 7th
- Leading goalkicker: Damien Petrone (41)

Club details
- Founded: 1989; 37 years ago
- Colours: Royal blue; Gold
- Competition: Essendon District Football League
- President: Matt Noy
- Coach: Steve Burns (Senior Men) Joe Antonetti (Senior Women)
- Captain: Lockie Rayner
- Premierships: EDFL B/Div. 1 (1); 2010; EDFL DIVISION 2 (2024) (1): EDFL Reserves (5); 2008; 2014; 2015; 2016; 2017
- Ground: Lionheart Reserve, Taylors Lakes, Victoria

Uniforms
| Home | Away |

Other information
- Official website: www.taylorslakesfc.net

The Taylors Lakes Football Club, nicknamed the Lions or colloquially the Lakers, is an Australian rules football club located in Taylors Lakes, Victoria, north west of Melbourne. The club originated in 1989 with the intention to field junior sides, and in 1991 affiliated with the Essendon District Football League at a senior level. The club has competed in the league since 1993, and today fields teams in Division 1 and Division 1 Reserves, as well as a number of junior squads.

The club's home games are held at Lionheart Reserves, which also houses the club's administrative headquarters.

== History ==
The Lions reached their first grand final in 2008, with a reserves team securing the Essendon District Football League (EDFL) B Grade Reserves premiership. In 2010, the club's senior and reserve teams qualified for their respective grand finals, with the senior team defeating Pascoe Vale 16.14 (110) to 10.12 (72). This saw the side promoted from B Grade to A Grade for the 2011 season, but would ultimately be relegated into a restructured Division 1 from 2012 onwards.

The club's reserve side has had continued success, winning four consecutive grand finals between 2014 and 2017.

In January 2019, former Avondale Heights player Charles Cuzzupi was announced as the Lions' new senior coach.

== Honours ==
Club premierships
| League | Competition | Wins | Year won |
| Essendon District Football League | Division 1 (B Grade) | 1 | 2010 |
| Essendon District Football League | Division 1 Reserves (B Grade Reserves) | 5 | 2008, 2014, 2015, 2016, 2017 |

== VFL/AFL players from Taylors Lakes Football Club ==
- Robert Stevenson (Essendon)
- Mark Blicavs (Geelong)

Tyson Greenwood Bendigo Bombers / Essendon 2006/2011 played 46 games 28 goals
