= Luke Ryan =

Australian rules footballer (born 1996)

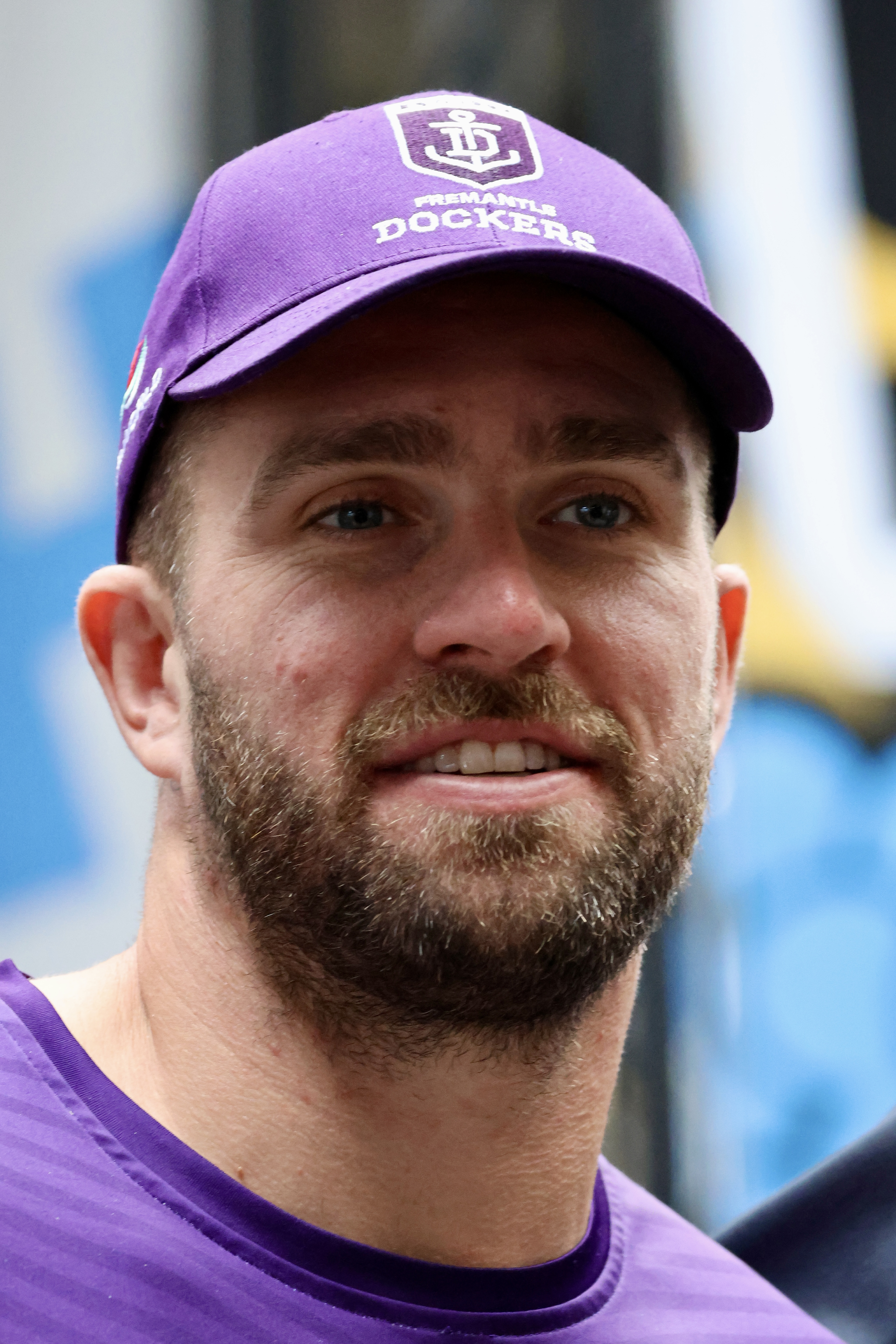
- Ryan at the 2026 Gather Round

Personal information
- Full name: Luke Ryan
- Born: 6 February 1996 (age 30)
- Original team: Coburg (VFL)/Calder Cannons (TAC Cup)
- Draft: No. 66, 2016 AFL draft
- Height: 186 cm (6 ft 1 in)
- Weight: 92 kg (203 lb)
- Position: Defender

Club information
- Current club: Fremantle
- Number: 13

Playing career^{1}
Years	Club	Games (Goals)
2017–	Fremantle	204 (3)
- ^{1} Playing statistics correct to the end of the preliminary finals, 2026.

Career highlights
- 2x All-Australian: 2020, 2024; Doig Medal: 2020; Goodes-O’Loughlin Medal: 2020; AFL Rising Star nominee: 2017; Beacon Award: 2017

Luke Ryan (born 6 February 1996) is a professional Australian rules footballer playing for the Fremantle Football Club in the Australian Football League (AFL). A versatile player, Ryan is a Doig Medalist as well as a dual All-Australian.

== Early career ==
Originally from the Melbourne suburb of Ascot Vale, Ryan played junior football for Aberfeldie, Moonee Valley and Maribyrnong Park in the Essendon District Football League, as well as some games for the Calder Cannons in the TAC Cup. He then played for the Coburg Football Club in the Victorian Football League (VFL) in 2016, winning the Fothergill–Round Medal as the most promising young player in the league. In 2017, he was awarded the Simpson Medal for the best player on ground during Peel Thunder's victory over Subiaco in the West Australian Football League grand final.

== AFL career ==
He was recruited as a mature age player to Fremantle with their third selection, 66th overall, in the 2016 AFL draft. He made his AFL debut in round 11 of the 2017 AFL season against Collingwood at Domain Stadium, after playing well for Fremantle's reserves team, Peel Thunder, in the West Australian Football League (WAFL).

Ryan received the AFL Rising Star nomination for round 20 after gaining 28 possessions and taking 16 marks in the Dockers' 23-point win over the Gold Coast Suns at Domain Stadium. Ryan also received two votes in the 2017 Brownlow Medal from this round 20 match. Ryan kicked his first AFL goal in round 13 of the 2018 season during Fremantle's 57 point win over Carlton.

Luke Ryan was awarded the Beacon Award for the best first year player during the 2017 AFL season. An outstanding performance throughout the 2020 AFL season would see Ryan win the Doig Medal and named in the 2020 All-Australian team.

The 2021 AFL season saw Ryan play 19 games, missing three games due to injury, and finishing sixth in the Fremantle Dockers best and fairest.

Ryan played all 22 games during the 2022 AFL season, a career best, as well as in Fremantle's two finals appearances. A highlight of his season being his 32 disposal effort against the Western Bulldogs in round 21. Ryan played his 100th game during round 16 against Port Adelaide. Ryan was among Fremantle's best during their elimination final win over the Western Bulldogs at Optus Stadium, collecting 31 disposals and a game-high 25 kicks. He signed a four-year contract extension at the end of the season tying him to Fremantle until at least 2027.

Round one of the 2023 AFL season saw Ryan gather a game high 37 disposals against St Kilda. He was one of Fremantle's best players in round 20 during their 7-point win over Geelong at Kardinia Park collecting 28 disposals. He finished the season ranked elite in marks, kicks and metres gained by Champion Data.

Ryan collected 33 disposals and ten marks in Fremantle's opening game of the 2024 AFL season against the Brisbane Lions, and 23 disposals the next week against North Melbourne. He collected 27 disposals against Adelaide and was an integral part of Fremantle's defense helping to keep the crows star forwards goalless. As of the mid-season bye he was ranked elite in disposals, spoils, kicks, kicking efficiency, marks, rebound 50s and meters gained. He played his 150th game in round 19 against Melbourne during Fremantle's annual Starlight Purple Haze Game, and in doing so earned himself a life membership at the Dockers. He was named at back pocket in the 2024 All-Australian team at the season's end.

After an interrupted pre-season following shoulder reconstruction surgery in 2025, Ryan was not selected for the Dockers' 2026 season opener. He was left out of Fremantle's line-up for the first time since May 2021, ending his 107-game streak of consecutive games, the third-longest run in club history. In Round 23, Ryan played his 200th game for Fremantle, becoming just the 13th player to do so.

== Family ==
Luke is the cousin of former Brisbane Lions tall Brandon Ryan.

Children include a son who was born early 2026 with ex-partner Kylie Mann. Sports Addict

== Honours & Achievements ==
Team

- AFL minor premiership: 2026 (Fremantle)
- WAFL premiership player: 2017 (Peel Thunder)

Individual

- 2x All-Australian: 2020, 2024
- Doig Medal: 2020
- Goodes-O’Loughlin Medal: 2020
- Simpson Medal: (2017)
- Fothergill-Round-Mitchell Medal: 2016
- AFL Rising Star nominee: 2017
- Beacon Award: 2017

== Statistics ==
Updated to the end of round 22, 2026.

Legend
G	Goals	K	Kicks	D	Disposals	T	Tackles
B	Behinds	H	Handballs	M	Marks
†	Led the league for the season

Season	Team	No.	Games	Totals							Averages (per game)							Votes
Season	Team	No.	Games	G	B	K	H	D	M	T	G	B	K	H	D	M	T	Votes
2017	Fremantle	38	11	0	0	120	55	175	69	44	0.0	0.0	10.9	5.0	15.9	6.3	4.0	2
2018	Fremantle	38	20	2	1	260	102	362	131	43	0.1	0.1	13.0	5.1	18.1	6.6	2.2	0
2019	Fremantle	38	18	1	0	263	105	368	94	47	0.1	0.0	14.6	5.8	20.4	5.2	2.6	5
2020 (Note: The 2020 season was played with 17 home-and-away matches per team (down from 22) and 16-minute quarters with time on (down from 20-minute quarters with time on) due to the impact of the COVID-19 pandemic.)	Fremantle	13	17	0	0	252	65	317	88	20	0.0	0.0	14.8	3.8	18.6	5.2	1.2	6
2021	Fremantle	13	19	0	0	332	82	414	136	34	0.0	0.0	17.5	4.3	21.8	7.2	1.8	3
2022	Fremantle	13	24	0	1	403	116	519	167	45	0.0	0.0	16.8	4.8	21.6	7.0	1.9	3
2023	Fremantle	13	23	0	0	451	100	551	189	50	0.0	0.0	19.6^{†}	4.3	24.0	8.2	2.2	6
2024	Fremantle	13	23	0	1	466	92	558	198	47	0.0	0.0	20.3	4.0	24.3	8.6	2.0	7
2025	Fremantle	13	24	0	0	384	114	498	146	48	0.0	0.0	16.0	4.8	20.8	6.1	2.0	2
2026	Fremantle	13	20	0	1	312	95	407	141	31	0.0	0.1	15.6	4.8	20.4	7.1	1.6	0
Career			199	3	4	3243	926	4169	1359	409	0.0	0.0	16.3	4.7	20.9	6.8	2.1	34
