= Brandon Ryan =

Australian rules footballer (born 1997)

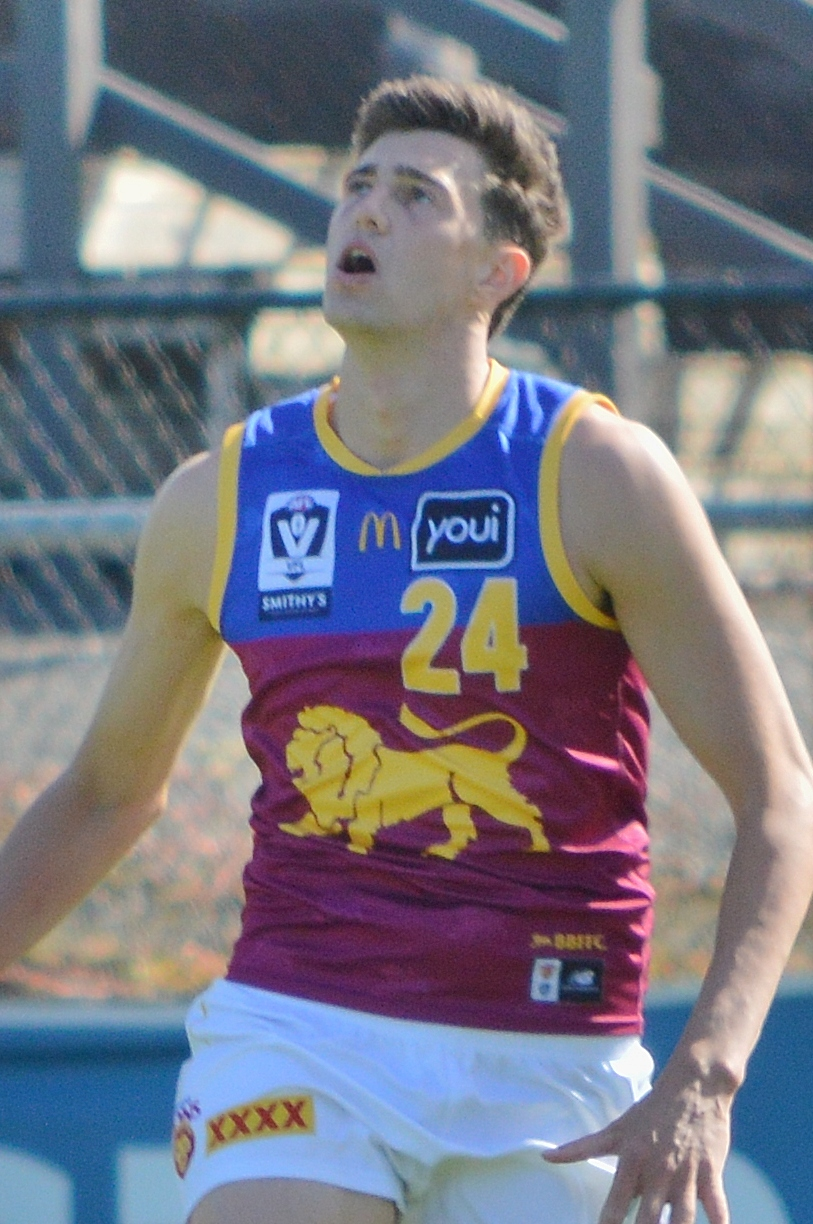
- Ryan in April 2025

Personal information
- Full name: Brandon Ryan
- Born: 7 November 1997 (age 28)
- Original team: Northern Bullants (VFL)
- Draft: No. 12, 2023 mid-season rookie draft
- Debut: Round 20, 2023, Hawthorn vs. St Kilda, at Docklands Stadium, Melbourne
- Height: 200 cm (6 ft 7 in)
- Weight: 91 kg (201 lb)
- Position: Forward

Playing career
Years	Club	Games (Goals)
2023	Hawthorn	3 (4)
2024–2025	Brisbane Lions	1 (1)
Total		4 (5)

Career highlights
- 2023 VFL Team of the Year; Northern Bullants leading goalkicker: 2023

Brandon Ryan (born 7 November 1997) is a former professional Australian rules footballer who played for Hawthorn and the Brisbane Lions in the Australian Football League (AFL).

== Early career ==
Brandon Ryan grew up at Barwon Heads, Victoria, where he learnt to play with the local juniors. He later played with the Geelong West Giants in the GFL. His style of play create interest from Geelong but only North Melbourne offered him a contract. He accepted a two-year deal with the North Melbourne to play in their VFL side. He didn't play a game at North so after Covid lockdown finished he found himself at Maribyrnong Park in the EDFL. Former AFL player and then-Northern Bullants coach Brodie Holland invited Ryan to do preseason training in 2023, which led to him joining the club. He played seven games before getting drafted.

== AFL career ==
=== Hawthorn ===
Ryan was the twelfth player picked in the 2023 mid-season draft, having made an impression playing for Northern Bullants in the Victorian Football League. By being drafted he lined up with Box Hill Hawks. He received a six-month contract with the Hawks.

He had to serve a suspension whilst he was with the Bullants. A series of strong performances for Box Hill saw him made his debut in round 20, 2023 against St Kilda at Docklands Stadium. He kicked a goal on debut. In his second game against ladder leaders Collingwood, he kicked 3 goals.

In September 2023 he signed a contract extension for season 2024, but was ultimately traded to Brisbane on the final day of trade period.

=== Brisbane ===
Ryan played one match over two seasons for the Lions, both seasons which were premiership seasons for the club, before being delisted at the end of the 2025 AFL season.

== Family ==
Ryan is the cousin of Fremantle star defender Luke Ryan.

== Statistics ==
=== AFL ===
Legend
G	Goals	K	Kicks	D	Disposals	T	Tackles
B	Behinds	H	Handballs	M	Marks

Season	Team	No.	Games	Totals							Averages (per game)							Votes
Season	Team	No.	Games	G	B	K	H	D	M	T	G	B	K	H	D	M	T	Votes
2023	Hawthorn	46	3	4	1	15	3	18	10	3	1.3	0.3	5.0	1.0	6.0	3.3	1.0	0
2024	Brisbane Lions	24	1	1	0	2	0	2	1	1	1.0	0.0	2.0	0.0	2.0	1.0	1.0	0
2025	Brisbane Lions	24	0	—	—	—	—	—	—	—	—	—	—	—	—	—	—	0
Career			4	5	1	17	3	20	11	4	1.3	0.3	4.3	0.8	5.0	2.8	1.0	0

=== VFL ===
Updated to the end of round 13, 2024.

Legend
G	Goals	K	Kicks	D	Disposals	T	Tackles
B	Behinds	H	Handballs	M	Marks

Season	Team	No.	Games	Totals							Averages (per game)						
Season	Team	No.	Games	G	B	K	H	D	M	T	G	B	K	H	D	M	T
2023	Northern Bullants	14	7	18	10	65	33	98	35	10	2.6	1.4	9.3	4.7	14.0	5.0	1.4
2023	Box Hill	46	8	13	15	55	34	89	43	9	1.6	1.9	6.9	4.3	11.1	5.4	1.1
2024	Brisbane Lions	24	8	13	8	61	38	99	39	8	1.6	1.0	7.6	4.8	12.4	4.9	1.0
VFL-listed career			23	44	33	181	105	286	117	27	1.9	1.4	7.9	4.6	12.4	5.1	1.2
