= SKFC =

SKFC may refer to:

- St Kilda Football Club
- Sporting Khalsa F.C.
- Sunbury Kangaroos Football Club
