= Gary Barrow =

Australian rules footballer

Personal information
- Full name: Gary Barrow
- Born: 18 January 1970 (age 56)
- Original team: Avondale Heights (EDFL)
- Draft: No. 51, 1989 pre-season draft
- Height: 183 cm (6 ft 0 in)
- Weight: 78 kg (172 lb)

Playing career^{1}
Years	Club	Games (Goals)
1992–1993	Footscray	6 (1)
- ^{1} Playing statistics correct to the end of 1993.

Gary Barrow (born 18 January 1970) is a former Australian rules footballer who played with Footscray in the Australian Football League (AFL).

Barrow, who was recruited from Essendon District Football League (EDFL) club Avondale Heights, played initially for Essendon, but didn't play a senior AFL game for the club. He went to Footscray in the 1991 National Draft and made two league appearances late in the 1992 AFL season. In 1993 he played four games, also late in the season.
