= Artie Rennie =

Australian rules footballer, born 1906

Personal information
- Full name: Arthur Clarence Rennie
- Born: 20 June 1906; Rutherglen, Victoria
- Died: 10 May 1998 (aged 91)
- Original team: St John's
- Height: 177 cm (5 ft 10 in)
- Weight: 71 kg (157 lb)
- Positions: Back pocket, half-back

Playing career^{1}
Years	Club	Games (Goals)
1927–1929	Essendon	23 (0)
- ^{1} Playing statistics correct to the end of 1929.

Arthur Clarence Rennie (20 June 1906 – 10 May 1998) was an Australian rules footballer who played for the Essendon Football Club in the Victorian Football League (VFL). He was cleared to fellow VFL club, Melbourne, in 1930, but he did not play a senior game for them. Rennie later played for Victorian Football Association (VFA) team Prahran for several seasons.

Rennie's brother, Les, also played senior football for Essendon.
