= John May (Australian footballer) =

Australian rules footballer (born 1951)

Personal information
- Full name: John L. May
- Born: 15 April 1951 (age 75)
- Original team: West Coburg
- Height: 173 cm (5 ft 8 in)
- Weight: 67 kg (148 lb)
- Positions: Wingman, rover

Playing career^{1}
Years	Club	Games (Goals)
1970–71	Essendon	3 (1)
- ^{1} Playing statistics correct to the end of 1970.

John May (born 15 April 1951) is a former Australian rules footballer who played with Essendon in the Victorian Football League (VFL). May was recruited to play for Essendon's under-19s from West Coburg in the Essendon District Football League. In 1970, his second season with the under-19s, he was named captain and also played several matches in the reserves before making his senior VFL debut late in the season. He kicked one goal from his three games playing as a midfielder and stayed with Essendon for another year, but spent it in the reserves as he could not break back into the senior team. In 1972, he left to play with Montmorency in the Diamond Valley Football League. May played for Montmorency for three seasons before joining Federal Football League side Parkdale 1975. He moved to Queensland after two years with Parkdale and played three seasons with Caloundra on the Sunshine Coast, winning a league best and fairest in 1978, before returning home to Victoria in 1980 where he continued playing with Parkdale.
