= Lance Whitnall =

Australian rules footballer, born 1979

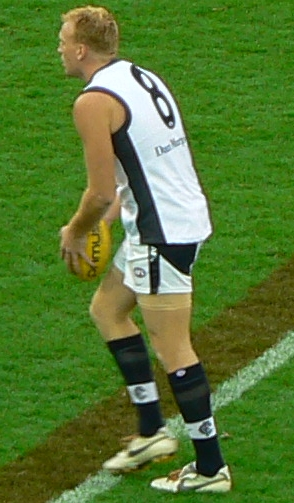

Personal information
- Born: 23 August 1979 (age 47)
- Original team: Lalor / Northern Knights
- Debut: Round 1, 31 March 1997, Carlton vs. Essendon, at Melbourne Cricket Ground
- Height: 192 cm (6 ft 4 in)
- Weight: 100 kg (220 lb)

Playing career^{1}
Years	Club	Games (Goals)
1997–2007	Carlton	216 (348)
- ^{1} Playing statistics correct to the end of 2007.

Career highlights
- Carlton captain: 2007; All-Australian: 2000; John Nicholls Medal: 2006; AFL Rising Star nominee: 1997

Lance Whitnall (born 23 August 1979) is a former Australian rules footballer, and a former captain of the Carlton Football Club.

== Early career (1997–1999) ==
Debuting in 1997 as a 17-year-old, the young Whitnall was recruited in the 1996 AFL draft under the father–son rule, with his father Graeme having played 66 games for Carlton in the 1970s and 1980s.

The young red-headed, freckled Whitnall, known as "Banger", "Big Red" or simply "Red", quickly established himself in Carlton's best 22, kicking four goals on debut, and missing only a handful of games in 1997 and playing every game in 1998 and 1999. He became a vital part of Carlton's forward line, and in Round 17, 1998 against the Western Bulldogs, the then-19-year-old Whitnall became one of the youngest players to kick 8 goals in a game. It was in this match that he well and truly had established his presence. Whitnall finished with 46 goals for the 1998 season, followed by 55 goals in 1999.

== Mid-career (2000–2003) ==
In 2000, Whitnall had his best-ever season when he kicked 70 goals, including his career-best 9.4 against Brisbane in Round 16, and he was named in the All-Australian Team.

However, from there, Whitnall had suffered a number of setbacks in his career, with ongoing injury and weight problems.

== Late career (2004–2007) ==
In 2005, Whitnall turned around his previous weight problems and came out looking as fit as he had ever been. He performed very well during 2005 and 2006, playing predominantly as the senior member of the Blues' young backline. He capped off a solid 2006 with victory in the Blues' best and fairest (the John Nicholls Medal), and at the age of 27, Whitnall became the second youngest Carlton player (after Robert Walls) to play 200 AFL games.

A long-term member of the leadership team, and widely regarded as having one of the best football brains in the game, Whitnall first took over the captaincy of the team during Anthony Koutoufides' hand injury in 2006, and became the full-time captain in 2007 after Koutoufides relinquished the position. However, he struggled in 2007 with ongoing problems with a degenerative condition in his knee. At the completion of the 2007 season, concerns by the club about his degenerative knee being able to stand up to the pressures of AFL football forced Whitnall into retirement, bringing his 11-season, 216-game career at Carlton to an end at 28 years of age.

== Statistics ==
Legend
G	Goals	K	Kicks	D	Disposals	T	Tackles
B	Behinds	H	Handballs	M	Marks	H/O	Hit-outs

Season	Team	No.	Games	Totals								Averages (per game)								Votes
Season	Team	No.	Games	G	B	K	H	D	M	T	H/O	G	B	K	H	D	M	T	H/O	Votes
1997	Carlton	8	18	19	15	123	55	178	71	7	7	1.1	0.8	6.8	3.1	9.9	3.9	0.4	0.4	0
1998	Carlton	8	22	46	34	229	114	343	148	23	46	2.1	1.5	10.4	5.2	15.6	6.7	1.0	2.1	8
1999	Carlton	8	26	55	36	266	118	384	191	22	81	2.1	1.4	10.2	4.5	14.8	7.3	0.8	3.1	0
2000	Carlton	8	25	70	45	296	95	391	208	35	62	2.8	1.8	11.8	3.8	15.6	8.3	1.4	2.5	9
2001	Carlton	8	21	37	21	226	76	302	146	27	41	1.8	1.0	10.8	3.6	14.4	7.0	1.3	2.0	2
2002	Carlton	8	14	28	17	162	45	207	103	15	41	2.0	1.2	11.6	3.2	14.8	7.4	1.1	2.9	3
2003	Carlton	8	12	11	11	137	42	179	73	13	26	0.9	0.9	11.4	3.5	14.9	6.1	1.1	2.2	0
2004	Carlton	8	19	24	14	141	61	202	75	18	52	1.3	0.7	7.4	3.2	10.6	3.9	0.9	2.7	0
2005	Carlton	8	22	24	21	229	110	339	139	20	49	1.1	1.0	10.4	5.0	15.4	6.3	0.9	2.2	5
2006	Carlton	8	22	15	8	284	130	414	177	26	23	0.7	0.4	12.9	5.9	18.8	8.0	1.2	1.0	5
2007	Carlton	8	15	19	16	148	54	202	86	15	22	1.3	1.1	9.9	3.6	13.5	5.7	1.0	1.5	0
Career			216	348	238	2241	900	3141	1417	221	450	1.6	1.1	10.4	4.2	14.5	6.6	1.0	2.1	32

== Post-AFL career ==
Whitnall was recruited by NTFL side the Palmerston Magpies after being delisted by Carlton and played in two of the club's matches in the 2007/08 season, kicking several goals.

In the 2008 winter season, Whitnall returned to play for original club Lalor in the NFL. He played there in 2008 and 2009. In 2010, Whitnall shifted to the EDFL's Craigieburn Football Club where he served as playing assistant coach for two seasons; in 2011, Whitnall was the EDFL's A-Grade leading goalkicker, after kicking fourteen goals in the final round to secure the title. Whitnall finished his playing career at Glenroy, also in the EDFL, and also coached there from 2012 until 2015. He has been in an assistant coaching role at the Calder Cannons in the TAC Cup since 2016.

Whitnall also played cricket at a suburban level for the Lalor Warriors Cricket Club in the North Metro Cricket Association, where he was an opening or top order batsman, and was on the club's committee until 2016.

In 2017, Whitnall returned to play football for the Division 3 NFL side, Laurimar Power Football Club, where he was their leading goal kicker, kicking 29 goals for the season.

In 2021, Whitnall became Division 6 champion playing lawn bowls for Brunswick Bowls Club.
