= Brodie Holland =

Australian rules footballer (born 1980)

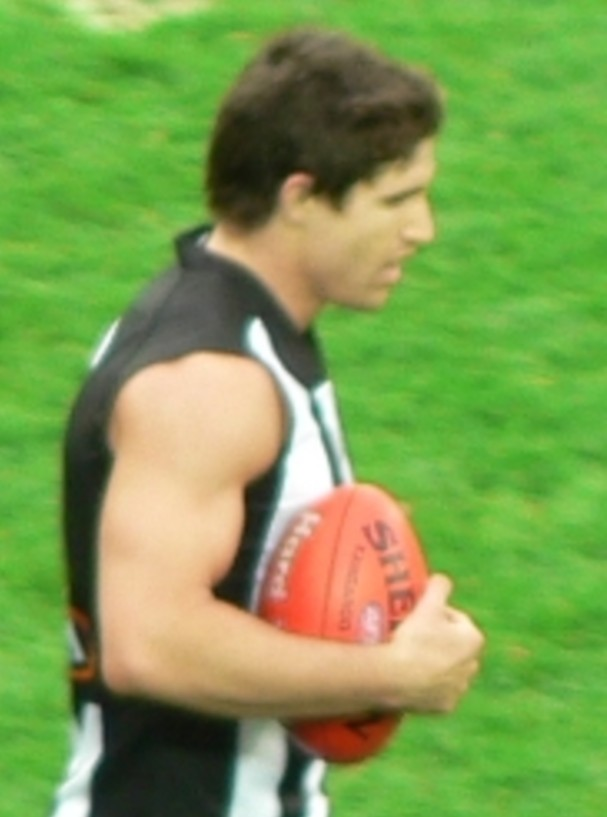
- Holland playing for Collingwood in 2006

Personal information
- Nickname: Dutchie
- Born: 3 January 1980 (age 46); Hobart, Tasmania, Australia
- Original team: Tassie Mariners/Glenorchy
- Height: 180 cm (5 ft 11 in)
- Weight: 80 kg (176 lb)

Playing career
Years	Club	Games (Goals)
1998–2000	Fremantle	36 (37)
2001–2008	Collingwood	119 (104)
Total		155 (141)

Coaching career
Years	Club	Games (W–L–D)
2023	Northern Bullants (VFL)	18 (2–16–0)

Career highlights
- 2nd Collingwood best and fairest 2005

Brodie Holland (born 3 January 1980) is a former Australian rules footballer who played for Fremantle and Collingwood in the Australian Football League (AFL).

== Early life ==
From Tasmania, where he attended St Virgil's College, Brodie was drafted to Fremantle in the 1997 AFL draft at no.26 overall.

== AFL career ==
He made his debut mid-way through 1998 as a small-forward and played most games since making his first appearance. He spent a further 2 seasons at the Dockers before being traded to Collingwood in 2000. Holland quickly adapted as a good player with the Magpies and became a fan favourite in his first season, kicking 28 goals in 21 matches.

In 2002 he started off with a 3-goal haul against Richmond and then produced an 8-goal haul a week later against the West Coast Eagles, to be the leading goalkicker for the season after round 2. He then was quiet for the rest of the season. He injured his back, causing a month out of the game, but could not get back in the side until late season. He was dropped after round 22 and missed the Magpies first finals campaign since 1994, which included playing in the 2002 AFL Grand Final. 2003 saw him change to a tagging role in the midfield rather than the inconsistent goal-kicking small forward. He had a clash with Scott Camporeale of Carlton leaving him with a bloodied nose, while late in the year, he was suspended for punching Paul Williams of Sydney in the stomach. He missed the first final but managed to get back in for the Preliminary and Grand Final sides.

He continued as a tagging midfielder, despite some problems at the tribunal during years 2004 and 2005, and his good form bought him very close to winning the Copeland Trophy, coming second to James Clement in 2005.

While he could not retain his 2005 form, he continued to be a fan favourite in 2006, showing grit and determination to win the ball, highlighted in a match against the Geelong Football Club, in which he bravely laid a huge tackle on Geelong big man Cameron Mooney.

In the Elimination Final against the Western Bulldogs, Holland was suspended for 6 weeks for rough conduct against Brett Montgomery.

After playing just 1 game in 2008 due to injury, Holland was delisted by Collingwood. He was hopeful of continuing his career at another AFL club but was not picked up, he then retired.

== Suburban football ==
After being delisted by Collingwood he took up a suburban football in the Essendon District Football League with the Maribyrnong Park Football Club where he had become captain-coach, however he was banned after striking a young opponent from the Doutta Stars. Holland has been deregistered from the Essendon league when it was found that on a technicality, Holland is not eligible to play in the league. The regulations of AFL Victoria, the sport's governing body, say that a player who has served more than 16 weeks' suspension in one competition cannot transfer to another. Holland was outed for more than 16 games during his 11-year career at the top level with Fremantle and Collingwood. Despite not being able to play, he has been allowed to continue to coach if he chooses.

Holland appealed this decision and was allowed to continue as playing coach. On 13 Sep 2009 the Maribyrnong Park Lions won the EDFL A Grade Grand Final – Maribyrnong Park 102 def Greenvale 84.

In 2010, Maribyrnong Park finished 4th at the end of the home and away season. They went on to defeat 3rd placed Oak Park then 2nd placed Keilor to advance to the Grand Final against Greenvale. On 12 Sep 2010, in a back to back as playing coach, Holland led the Maribyrnong Park A Grade Seniors team to victory - Maribyrnong Park 90 def Greenvale 73.

In 2015, Holland left heading north to play for the Broadford Football Netball Club in the Riddel District Football League. Holland was a pivotal player in Broadford making the finals for the first time since rejoining the RDFL.

== Coaching career ==
In November 2022, the Northern Bullants club appointed Holland as their coach for the 2023 Victorian Football League (VFL) season. The club had two wins early on in the season, but were unable to achieve anymore, finishing 20th. Holland resigned as coach effective immediately shortly after the club's final game of the season.

== Media profile ==
In 2005, Holland participated in the Seven Network's television show Dancing with the Stars with dance partner Alana. Holland made it to the top four before being voted off the show.

In 2006, Holland appeared in several advertisements on television for a lottery advertisement along with the NRL's Matthew Johns. He also made a cameo appearance as himself in the soap opera Neighbours.

Holland also made several appearances as a panellist on the AFL Footy Show.
