= Ahmed Saad (Australian footballer) =

Australian rules footballer (born 1989)

Personal information
- Full name: Ahmed Saad
- Born: 9 October 1989 (age 37); Melbourne, Australia
- Original team: Roxburgh Park (EDFL)
- Draft: Pre-listed recruit, Greater Western Sydney; Traded to St Kilda, 2011 Trade Week
- Height: 175 cm (5 ft 9 in)
- Weight: 75 kg (165 lb)
- Position: Forward pocket and wing

Playing career
Years	Club	Games (Goals)
2010–2011	Northern Bullants (VFL)	35 (73)
2012–2013; 2015	St Kilda (AFL)	33 (48)
2016	Coburg (VFL)	(49)

Career highlights
- Frosty Miller Medal 2016; Fothergill–Round Medal 2011

Ahmed Saad (Arabic: أَحْمَد سَعْد; born 9 October 1989) is an Australian rules footballer who formerly played for the St Kilda Football Club in the Australian Football League (AFL). He was delisted in 2013 after receiving an 18-month suspension for testing positive to a banned substance, but was redrafted by the Saints as a rookie at the end of 2014.

== Early career ==
Saad was born to Egyptian parents in Australia. At age 8 his family moved to Egypt where he played representative soccer as a striker or winger. He returned to Australia at age 14, attending secondary school in Roxburgh Park, Victoria. He played Australian rules football for the first time at age 16, filling in to make up the numbers for his school before joining the local Roxburgh Park Football Club.

Saad joined the Northern Bullants in the Victorian Football League in 2009 in unusual circumstances. He had not received a formal invitation to join the club but turned up unannounced (inspired by his mother's words of wisdom and encouragement) to an early preseason training session and was permitted to participate. He did not play a senior game in 2009, but went on to play 35 senior games for the club over the following two years. In the 2011 season, Saad kicked 50 goals and won the Fothergill–Round Medal as the league's most promising young player.

== AFL career ==
Saad caught the attention of AFL recruiters in the 2011 VFL season and then scored some impressive numbers in the AFL Draft Combine, with the fastest 20m sprint time and the second-highest agility score. He was recruited by the St Kilda Football Club by indirect means in the 2011 Trade Week: the fledgling Greater Western Sydney Giants recruited him directly, then immediately traded him to St Kilda, along with Terry Milera and draft pick 25, in exchange for pick 20. Saad was 22 years old when he was recruited.

Saad made his debut in Round 6, 2012, against Hawthorn at the Melbourne Cricket Ground. In round 7, 2012, his goal against Carlton and in Round 21, his goal against Geelong were both nominated for Goal of the Year.

Saad received an 18-month ban after testing positive to a banned substance. Saad consumed an energy drink "Before Battle" which contained the banned stimulant methylsynephrine.

Saad was delisted by St Kilda as a result of the investigation at the end of the 2013 season. He was redrafted as a rookie by St Kilda in the 2015 Rookie Draft. He played four games for St Kilda during the 2015 season and was delisted again in October 2015.

== Post-AFL career ==
Saad returned to the VFL in 2016, and joined stand-alone club Coburg. He kicked 49 goals in the 2016 season to lead the VFL and win the Frosty Miller Medal. He was also named Full Forward in the VFL team of the year.

== Personal life ==
Saad graduated from Roxburgh College in 2007. He is the first player of Egyptian background and the third practising Muslim (after Sedat Sir and Bachar Houli) to be on the AFL playing list. In 2012 he was nominated as one of the AFL's multicultural ambassadors.
