= Jack Bytel =

Australian rules footballer (born 2000)

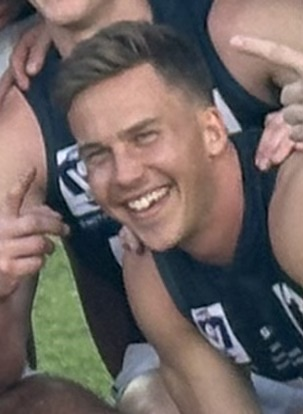
- Bytel in 2025

Personal information
- Full name: Jack Bytel
- Born: 14 March 2000 (age 26); Aberfeldie, Victoria
- Original team: Calder Cannons (NAB League)
- Draft: No. 41, 2018 AFL draft
- Debut: 10 August 2020, St Kilda vs. Geelong, at The Gabba
- Height: 189 cm (6 ft 2 in)
- Weight: 84 kg (185 lb)
- Position: Midfielder

Club information
- Current club: Coburg

Playing career
Years	Club	Games (Goals)
2019–2023	St Kilda	22 (3)
2024	Collingwood	7 (1)
Total		29 (4)

Jack Bytel (born 14 March 2000) is an Australian rules footballer who currently plays for the Coburg Football Club in the Victorian Football League (VFL). He previously played for St Kilda and Collingwood in the Australian Football League (AFL).

== Early life ==
Bytel was born in Aberfeldie, Victoria and participated in the Auskick program there and played junior football for the nearby Maribyrnong Park Football Club, before joining the Aberfeldie Football Club in 2013. He attended high school at Maribyrnong College as part of the schools selective sports academy. Bytel played for the Calder Cannons (where he was co-captain) for two seasons, playing sixteen games during his time at the club. In 2017 he averaged 27 possessions in the TAC Cup as a 17-year-old, and was compared to Sydney's Josh Kennedy. During his seasons with the Cannons, Bytel kicked 10 goals and averaged 25.2 disposals per game. He was selected to represent Vic Metro in the AFL Under 18 Championships in both 2017 and 2018, but stress fractures in his back restricted him to just four games over the two seasons, including three in 2018. Prior to his injury, Bytel had been tipped to be top-10 draft selection.

== AFL career ==
=== St Kilda ===
Bytel was recruited by St Kilda with the 41st pick in the 2018 AFL draft. The club were aware of his existing back injury, and as a result, in January 2019, Bytel underwent surgery to repair a bulging disk in his lower back. The surgery ruled him out for the 2019 season, the Saints took a conservative approach with the youngster.

Bytel debuted in the St Kilda's 59 point loss to Geelong in the 11th round of the 2020 AFL season. On debut, Bytel picked up 18 disposals, 2 marks and 2 tackles. He played the following two games, before being omitted for the remainder of the season. Bytel signed a two-year contract extension at the conclusion of the season, tying him to the Saints until the end of the 2022 season.

Bytel played the first two games of the 2021 season, but was omitted for round three. He reclaimed a place in round four where he had 19 disposals and seven tackles. Bytel had a career-best game in round seven against Hawthorn, collecting 21 disposals and 10 tackles in the Saints' 69-point win. Bytel suffered a concussion at training leading into the Round 15 match, meaning Bytel had to observe the 12-day concussion rule.

=== Collingwood ===
In February 2024, Bytel was selected by Collingwood in the pre-season supplemental selection period. Bytel played 7 matches for the Magpies before being delisted after one season at the club.

== Statistics ==
Legend
G	Goals	K	Kicks	D	Disposals	T	Tackles
B	Behinds	H	Handballs	M	Marks

Season	Team	No.	Games	Totals							Averages (per game)							Votes
Season	Team	No.	Games	G	B	K	H	D	M	T	G	B	K	H	D	M	T	Votes
2019	St Kilda	23	0	—	—	—	—	—	—	—	—	—	—	—	—	—	—	0
2020 (Note: The 2020 season was played with 17 home-and-away matches per team (down from 22) and 16-minute quarters with time on (down from 20-minute quarters with time on) due to the impact of the COVID-19 pandemic.)	St Kilda	23	3	0	0	9	30	39	3	8	0.0	0.0	3.0	10.0	13.0	1.0	2.7	0
2021	St Kilda	23	13	2	1	70	79	149	18	55	0.2	0.1	5.4	6.1	11.5	1.4	4.2	0
2022	St Kilda	23	0	—	—	—	—	—	—	—	—	—	—	—	—	—	—	0
2023	St Kilda	23	6	1	1	25	23	48	15	11	0.2	0.2	4.2	3.8	8.0	2.5	1.8	0
2024	Collingwood	27	7	1	1	48	38	86	29	10	0.1	0.1	6.9	5.4	12.3	4.1	1.4	0
Career			29	4	3	152	170	322	65	84	0.1	0.1	5.2	5.9	11.1	2.2	2.9	0
