= Cam Rayner =

Australian rules footballer (born 1999)

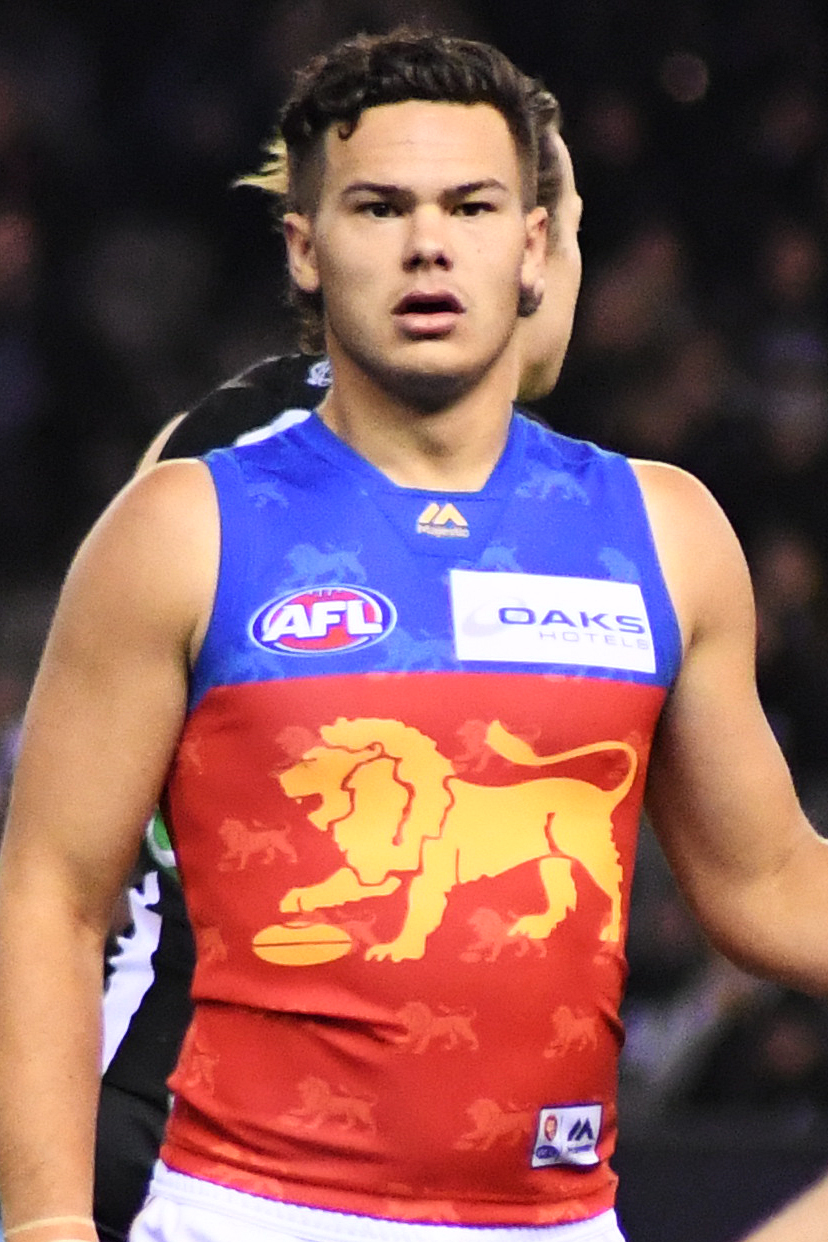
- Rayner in August 2018

Personal information
- Full name: Cameron Rayner
- Born: 21 October 1999 (age 27)
- Original team: Western Jets (TAC Cup)/Hillside (EDFL)
- Draft: No. 1, 2017 national draft
- Debut: Round 1, 2018, Brisbane Lions vs. St Kilda, at Etihad Stadium
- Height: 187 cm (6 ft 2 in)
- Weight: 93 kg (205 lb)
- Position: Forward

Club information
- Current club: Brisbane Lions
- Number: 16

Playing career^{1}
Years	Club	Games (Goals)
2018–	Brisbane Lions	188 (194)
- ^{1} Playing statistics correct to the end of round 22, 2026.

Career highlights
- 3× AFL premiership player: 2024, 2025, 2026; AFL Rising Star nominee: 2018

Cameron Rayner (born 21 October 1999) is a professional Australian rules footballer playing for the Brisbane Lions in the Australian Football League (AFL).

== Early life ==
Rayner was born to mother Nicole, a primary school teacher, and father John, a boilermaker, and raised in Sydenham in Melbourne. The family were strong Essendon Football Club supporters and Cameron grew up idolising Matthew Lloyd. Rayner played junior football with the Hillside Football Club and Essendon Doutta Stars in the Essendon District Football League winning six club best and fairest awards. He made the under-12s Victorian squad, however was later dropped as he was considered too small a player. However he later went through a growth spurt and played for the Western Jets in the TAC Cup/Talent League.

He attended Taylors Lakes Secondary College before moving to Penleigh and Essendon Grammar School on a football scholarship.

Rayner was selected in the AFL Academy in 2017 and despite splitting his toe open was dominant with a three goal performance for Team Daniher in the 20th Anniversary match at the Melbourne Cricket Ground. He would back up this performance with a 3 goal game for Vic Metro at the AFL Under-18 Championships, earning him a spot in the Under-18 All-Australian team.

He was drafted by Brisbane with the first overall selection in the 2017 national draft.

== AFL career ==
Rayner made his debut in the twenty-five point loss to St Kilda at Etihad Stadium in the opening round of the 2018 season, recording 8 disposals including his first AFL goal. In round 4, on what was a horror day for the Lions, Rayner was a shining light for the Lions, recording a career-best 22 disposals and kicking his side's second of 2 goals for the day in a 93-point loss against reigning premiers Richmond at the MCG. In the following round in the QClash against Gold Coast, Rayner had a chance to draw the match right on the full-time siren, but he pulled his kick wide to the left for a behind and the Lions were defeated by 5 points.

Rayner received the AFL Rising Star nomination for round 15 after kicking two goals and recording nineteen disposals in the Lions' win over Fremantle at Optus Stadium. Rayner had a chance to win the game against North Melbourne in round 20 after being awarded a free kick on a slight angle 30m from goal, but he attempted a kick around the body and his shot went wide to the right for a behind. The Lions lost by 3 points.

On 5 November 2020, Rayner signed a three-year extension with Brisbane, contracting him until the end of 2023.

In a 2021 pre season clash against the Gold Coast Suns, Rayner ruptured his ACL and missed the entire season.

Rayner was part of the Brisbane Lions 2024 premiership winning team, kicking a goal and having 16 disposals in a 60-point victory over the Sydney Swans.

== Statistics ==
Updated to the end of round 22, 2026.

Legend
G	Goals	K	Kicks	D	Disposals	T	Tackles
B	Behinds	H	Handballs	M	Marks
#	Played in that season's premiership team

Season	Team	No.	Games	Totals							Averages (per game)							Votes
Season	Team	No.	Games	G	B	K	H	D	M	T	G	B	K	H	D	M	T	Votes
2018	Brisbane Lions	16	22	20	14	149	148	297	76	52	0.9	0.6	6.8	6.7	13.5	3.5	2.4	3
2019	Brisbane Lions	16	24	20	25	139	90	229	59	51	0.8	1.0	5.8	3.8	9.5	2.5	2.1	0
2020 (Note: The 2020 season was played with 17 home-and-away matches per team (down from 22) and 16-minute quarters with time on (down from 20-minute quarters with time on) due to the impact of the COVID-19 pandemic.)	Brisbane Lions	16	17	17	7	85	82	167	51	54	1.0	0.4	5.0	4.8	9.8	3.0	3.2	2
2021	Brisbane Lions	16	0	—	—	—	—	—	—	—	—	—	—	—	—	—	—	0
2022	Brisbane Lions	16	24	24	21	211	142	353	76	56	1.0	0.9	8.8	5.9	14.7	3.2	2.3	4
2023	Brisbane Lions	16	26	23	17	215	153	368	102	58	0.9	0.7	8.3	5.9	14.2	3.9	2.2	2
2024^{#}	Brisbane Lions	16	27	31	21	229	185	414	94	84	1.1	0.8	8.5	6.9	15.3	3.5	3.1	6
2025^{#}	Brisbane Lions	16	27	36	31	247	173	420	91	81	1.3	1.1	9.1	6.4	15.6	3.4	3.0	6
2026	Brisbane Lions	16	21	23	20	189	139	328	85	56	1.1	1.0	9.0	6.6	15.6	4.0	2.7	0
Career			188	194	156	1464	1112	2576	634	492	1.0	0.8	7.8	5.9	13.7	3.4	2.6	23

== Honours and achievements ==
Team

- AFL premiership player: 2024, 2025, 2026

Individual

- AFL Rising Star nominee: 2018
