= Essendon, Victoria =

Essendon
- Suburb
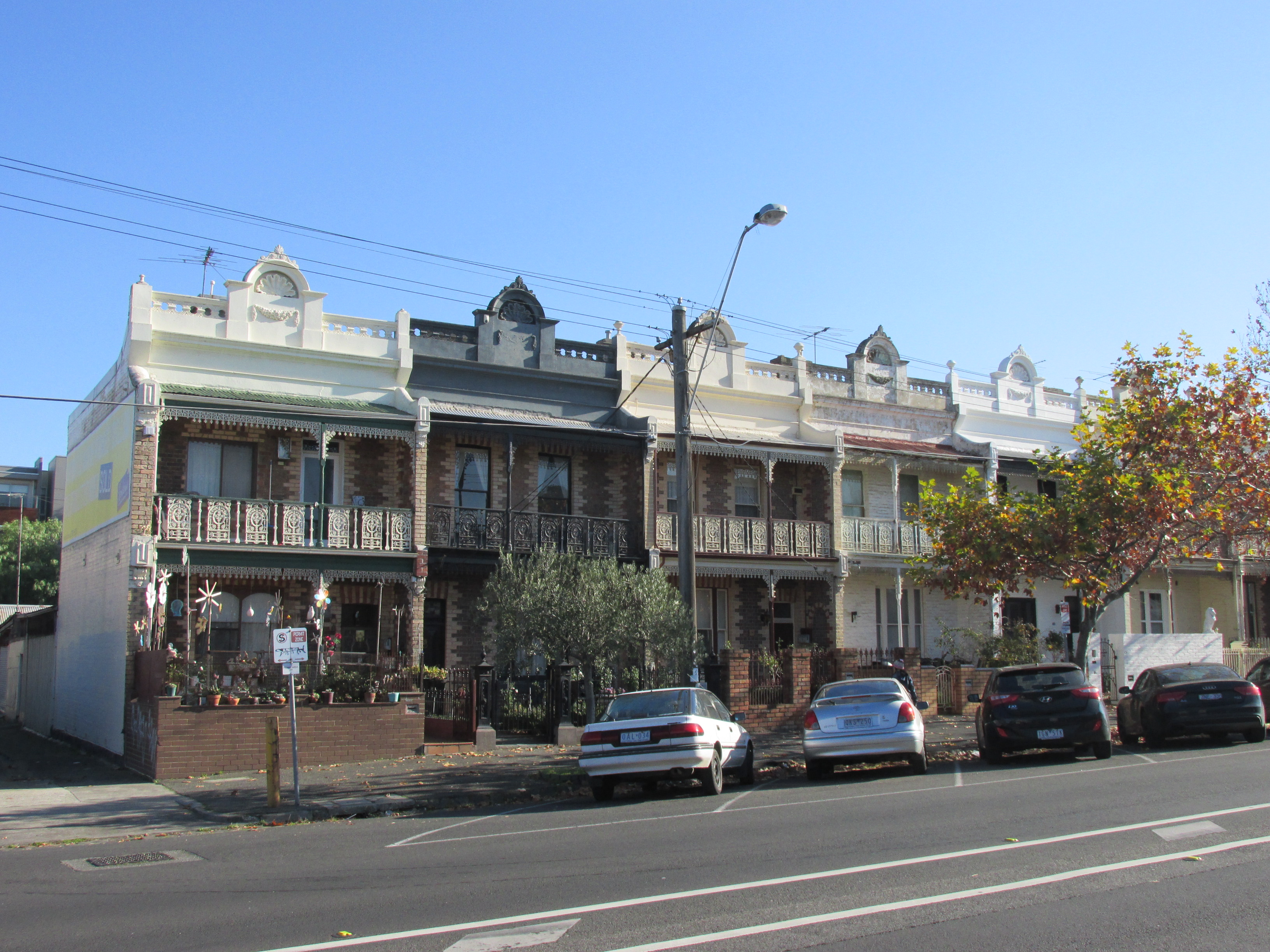
- Terraced houses on Napier Street

- Interactive map of Essendon
- Coordinates: 37.75°S 144.91°E
- Country: Australia
- State: Victoria
- City: Melbourne
- LGA: City of Moonee Valley
- Location: 8 km (5.0 mi) from Melbourne

Government
  - State electorates: Essendon; Niddrie
  - Federal division: Maribyrnong

Area
  - Total: 6.2 km^{2} (2.4 sq mi)
- Elevation: 48 m (157 ft)

Population
  - Total: 21,240 (2021 census)
  - Density: 3,426/km^{2} (8,870/sq mi)
- Postcode: 3040
Suburbs around Essendon
Essendon North	Strathmore	Strathmore
Essendon West, Niddrie	Essendon	Brunswick West, Pascoe Vale South
Aberfeldie	Moonee Ponds	Moonee Ponds

Essendon (/ɛsəndən/) is a suburb in Melbourne, Victoria, Australia, 8 km (5.0 mi) north-west of Melbourne's central business district. It is located within the City of Moonee Valley local government area. Essendon recorded a population of 21,240 at the 2021 census.

Essendon is bounded in the west by Hoffmans Road, in the north by Keilor Road and Woodland Street, in the east by the Moonee Ponds Creek, and in the south by Buckley Street (with a small portion further south bordering Moonee Ponds).

== History ==
=== Indigenous history ===
Essendon and the banks of the Maribyrnong River were originally inhabited by the Wurundjeri clan of the Woiwurrung speaking people of the Kulin nation. The formally recognised traditional owners for the area in which Essendon is located are the Wurundjeri people, represented by the Wurundjeri Woi Wurrung Cultural Heritage Aboriginal Corporation.

=== European history ===
In 1803, Charles Grimes and James Fleming were the first known European explorers into the Maribyrnong area.

Essendon was named after the village of Essendon in Hertfordshire, England. Richard Green, who arrived in Victoria in the 1850s and settled near Melbourne, was a native of Essendon, Hertfordshire, where his father Isaac Green was either owner or tenant of Essendon Mill, and he bestowed the name of his native village on the district in which he had made his new home.

In 1851, the gold rush opened up the Moonee Ponds District with miners travelling along Mount Alexander Road to Castlemaine.

Essendon Post Office opened on 18 August 1856.

In 1862, 169 residents sought the formation of the Borough of Essendon and Flemington.

On 9 January 1871, the Victorian Railways services began between Essendon and Melbourne, following an unsuccessful private railway operating from 1860 until 1864.

In the 1880s, the local Council resisted industrial development in the form of cattle saleyards and brickworks, out of concern for pollution of the Maribyrnong River. Instead it embarked on a program to create, in its upper reaches, a playground for rowers, fishermen and swimmers.

In 1890, Earlsbrae Hall, a Victorian Georgian mansion was built in the town. Designed by R. A. Lawson, it was built at a cost of £35,000 as the home of Collier McCracken, a member of a local brewing family. Purchased by the Anglican Church in c. 1918, the building now forms part of the Lowther Hall Anglican Grammar School.

In 1906, the North Melbourne Electric Tramway and Lighting Company opened its electric tramway system linking Essendon with the city. The company also supplied electric power to the neighbouring suburbs from its power station on Mount Alexander Road, near the intersection with South Street.

=== Heritage listings ===
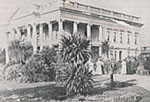
R. A. Lawson designed the Victorian Georgian-style mansion Earlsbrae Hall in 1890, now part of the Lowther Hall Anglican Grammar School

The following places in Essendon are listed on the Victorian Heritage Register:

- Canary Island Date Palm Avenue, on Mount Alexander Road
- Essendon High School (former), now a campus of the Essendon Keilor College, at 286 Buckley Street
- Essendon railway station, at 2-26 Russell Street
- Essendon Technical School (former), closed in 1992 and subsequently repurposed as a TAFE institute, at 38 Buckley Street
- Earlsbrae Hall mansion, now part of the Lowther Hall Anglican Grammar School, at 29 Leslie Road
- North Park, at 69 Woodland Street
- 2 Riverview Road, a private residence

== Demographics ==
In the 2021 census, a population of 21,420 was recorded for Essendon.

- 86 (0.4%) respondents identified as Aboriginal and/or Torres Strait Islander.
- 72.1% of the population were born in Australia. Other countries of birth commonly recorded were India (3.0%), Italy (2.4%), England (1.8%), China (1.3%), and New Zealand (1.3%).
- The most common ancestries recorded were English (26.6%), Australian (23.7%), Italian (16.3%), Irish (13.6%) and Scottish (8.2%).
- 72.8% of people spoke only English at home. Other languages commonly spoken at home included Italian (4.3%), Greek (2.4%), Mandarin (1.7%), Vietnamese (1.4%), and Arabic (1.1%).
- The most common responses recorded for religion were Catholic (37%), 'No Religion, so described' (32%), Eastern Orthodox (5.2%), Anglican (4.9%), and 'not stated' (4.6%).
- The median weekly household income in Essendon was recorded as $2,132.

== Transport ==
The number 59 tram provides public transport along Mount Alexander and Keilor Roads to the city.

Train services are available from Essendon station on Rose Street, Glenbervie station on Glass Street, and Strathmore station on Woodland Street, all located on the Craigieburn railway line.

Bus services are also available from Essendon railway station with several routes ending at the station or continuing through to Moonee Ponds.

The suburb is bordered on the south west by the Maribyrnong River Trail, and on the east and north by the Moonee Ponds Creek Trail. Both are used by commuting and recreational cyclists.

== Politics ==
The seat of Essendon, in the Victorian Legislative Assembly, is based on the suburb. The current state member is Danny Pearson, for the Australian Labor Party.

== Schools ==
The following schools are located in or serve the Essendon community:

=== Public schools ===
- Aberfeldie Primary School, Doone Street, Aberfeldie
- Buckley Park College, Cooper Street, Essendon
- Essendon Keilor College, Buckley Street, Essendon (Senior Campus)
- Essendon Primary School, Raleigh Street, Essendon
- Essendon North Primary School, Keilor Road, North Essendon

=== Independent ===
- Ave Maria College, Vida Street, Aberfeldie
- Lowther Hall Anglican Grammar School, Leslie Road, Essendon
- Penleigh and Essendon Grammar School, Raleigh Street, Essendon (Junior School (boys) P-6 and kindergarten campus)
- St. Bernard's College, Rosehill Road, Essendon
- St. Columba's College, Leslie Road, Essendon
- St. Therese's Primary School, Edward Street, Essendon

== Sport ==
Essendon is home of the Essendon Football Club (the Bombers), an Australian rules football club which is a member of the Australian Football League. Essendon is one of the most successful football teams in Australia, having won 16 premierships in the VFL/AFL.

The Essendon District Football League is one of the most successful suburban football competitions in Melbourne and in the zone days, fed many players into elite level competition.

== Climate ==
Essendon features a moderate oceanic climate (Cfb) with warm summers and cool, damp winters. It features 50.5 clear days annually—more than Melbourne CBD's 46 days.

Climate data for Essendon Airport, 1939-2022 normals and extremes
Month	Jan	Feb	Mar	Apr	May	Jun	Jul	Aug	Sep	Oct	Nov	Dec	Year
Record high °C (°F)	45.8 (114.4)	47.3 (117.1)	40.7 (105.3)	35.2 (95.4)	26.7 (80.1)	22.6 (72.7)	21.9 (71.4)	24.4 (75.9)	30.3 (86.5)	36.4 (97.5)	41.5 (106.7)	44.4 (111.9)	47.3 (117.1)
Mean daily maximum °C (°F)	26.6 (79.9)	25.9 (78.6)	24.1 (75.4)	20.2 (68.4)	16.4 (61.5)	13.8 (56.8)	13.2 (55.8)	14.4 (57.9)	16.9 (62.4)	19.5 (67.1)	22.0 (71.6)	24.6 (76.3)	19.8 (67.6)
Mean daily minimum °C (°F)	13.8 (56.8)	14.1 (57.4)	12.6 (54.7)	10.0 (50.0)	7.9 (46.2)	6.0 (42.8)	5.5 (41.9)	5.7 (42.3)	6.9 (44.4)	8.4 (47.1)	10.2 (50.4)	12.0 (53.6)	9.4 (48.9)
Record low °C (°F)	5.7 (42.3)	5.3 (41.5)	3.7 (38.7)	0.6 (33.1)	0.1 (32.2)	−3.3 (26.1)	−2.6 (27.3)	−2.4 (27.7)	−1.6 (29.1)	−0.3 (31.5)	2.2 (36.0)	4.0 (39.2)	−3.3 (26.1)
Average precipitation mm (inches)	43.7 (1.72)	43.9 (1.73)	39.4 (1.55)	54.3 (2.14)	49.0 (1.93)	40.3 (1.59)	42.8 (1.69)	48.1 (1.89)	50.8 (2.00)	59.3 (2.33)	58.5 (2.30)	51.4 (2.02)	585.7 (23.06)
Average precipitation days	7.4	7.3	8.9	11.1	13.3	13.5	15.2	15.7	14.3	13.1	11.7	10.1	141.6

== Other ==
Essendon is the birthplace of the singer Judith Durham, who went to Essendon Primary School.

There are also several churches in Essendon, of various denominations. Baptist churches within the area including the Essendon Community Baptist Church, the International Baptist Church and the Aberfeldie Baptist Church. The closest mosque to Essendon is the Glenroy Sunnah Mosque. Ukrainian Autocephalous Orthodox Church in Diaspora is located in Buckley Street Essendon; nearby the Association of Ukrainians in Victoria (AUV) has its head office in Russell Street Essendon.

== See also ==
- City of Essendon – Essendon was previously within this former local government area.
- Essendon Airport
