= Peter Baxter (footballer) =

Australian rules footballer

Personal information
- Full name: Peter Baxter
- Born: 4 July 1961 (age 65)
- Original team: Avondale Heights
- Height: 180 cm (5 ft 11 in)
- Weight: 80 kg (176 lb)

Playing career^{1}
| Years | Club | Games (Goals) |
| 1985–1988 | Footscray | 23 (2) |
- ^{1} Playing statistics correct to the end of 1988.

Peter Baxter (born 4 July 1961) is a former Australian rules footballer who represented the Footscray Football Club in the Victorian Football League (VFL) during the 1980s.

Baxter played only one game in his debut season, before having a strong second season, playing 16 games for the Dogs. Baxter managed only 6 more games over the next two seasons before leaving the club at the end of 1988.
