= David Starbuck =

Australian rules footballer

Personal information
- Full name: David Starbuck
- Born: 12 June 1950 (age 76); Melbourne, Victoria, Australia
- Original team: Pascoe Vale
- Height: 180 cm (5 ft 11 in)
- Weight: 71 kg (157 lb)
- Position: Wing

Playing career^{1}
Years	Club	Games (Goals)
1970–71	Essendon	13 (2)
- ^{1} Playing statistics correct to the end of 1971.

David Starbuck (born 12 June 1950) is a former Australian rules footballer who played for Essendon in the Victorian Football League (VFL).

Starbuck was recruited to Essendon from Pascoe Vale, a team he played under 19s with. A wingman, Starbuck played in a reserves premiership for Essendon in 1968 and, in the same year, came second in the Morrish Medal – awarded to the best and fairest player in the VFL under 19s competition – behind Paul Callery of Melbourne.

He made his senior debut in round 6, 1970, and went on to play seven total games that season. Starbuck played six further games in 1971 and he kicked the only two goals of his senior VFL career in what was to be his last game, a round 22 loss to Fitzroy.

Following his departure from Essendon, Starbuck went to play for Coburg in the Victorian Football Association from 1972 to 1973. Subsequent to that he played for various local clubs, including Romsey (1974), his original team Pascoe Vale (1975–79), Reservoir-Lakeside (1980–82) and Woodend (1983–84).
