= Graeme Whitnall =

Australian rules footballer (1952–2021)

Personal information
- Full name: Graeme Whitnall
- Nickname: Poppy
- Born: 25 April 1952
- Died: 5 August 2021 (aged 69); Darwin, Northern Territory
- Original team: Maryborough (BFL)
- Height: 178 cm (5 ft 10 in)
- Weight: 76 kg (168 lb)
- Position: Utility

Playing career^{1}
Years	Club	Games (Goals)
1974–79; 1980–81	Carlton	66 (20)
- ^{1} Playing statistics correct to the end of 1981.

Career highlights
- Carlton's Best First Year Player, 1974

Graeme Whitnall (25 April 1952 – 5 August 2021) was an Australian rules footballer who played with Carlton in the Victorian Football League (VFL). His son, Lance, played over 200 games for Carlton and won the best and fairest in 2006.
