= Roxburgh Park Football Club =

Names
- Full name: Roxburgh Park Football Club
- Nickname(s): Magpies, Roxy

2017 season
- Leading goalkicker: Tumay Hamza

Club details
- Founded: 2002
- Colours: Black, White and Silver
- Competition: Essendon District Football League
- Chairperson: Jason Bolitho
- Coach: Travis McCarty
- Captain(s): Harley "Big Head/Pitty" Short
- Ground(s): Lakeside Drive Reserve, Roxburgh Park

Other information
- Official website: www.roxburghparkfc.com.au

The Roxburgh Park Football Club is an Australian rules football club located 24 km north of Melbourne in the new housing estate of Roxburgh Park. It was founded as a junior club in 2002, fielding seven junior teams in the Essendon District Football League.
The senior team was formed in 2005 and admitted to the EDFL's B Grade competition the same year. It won 6 of its 17 fixtures in its debut season to finish 11th.

== Club achievements ==
Year Achievement
2002 Club plays first games in its history in EDFL juniors in division three and five from under 10s up to under 16s with two sides making grand finals.
2003 Junior sides promoted to division two and new change rooms on oval one after using youth recreation centre in its first year.
2004 Club makes application to EDFL to enter senior sides in 2005 and appoints John Rombotis to be first senior coach of the club.
2005 Club has senior sides in EDFL for first time playing Westmeadows in round one. Seniors coached by John Rombotis, Reserves by Jason Bolitho. Club also wins its first premiership in division four under 14s coached by Denis Barnes.
2006 Club juniors are promoted into division one and club's first president Ewan Wright resigns.
2007 Mario Patane takes over as president while Craig Burrows becomes senior coach.
2008 Juniors placed back into division two after restructure of juniors by EDFL. Club wins second premiership in under 12 division 5 coached by Lance Heathcote.
2009 Saw the death of young 20-year-old player Jellal Sleiman on the morning of a match. Later that year the scoreboard was named in his honor and memory.
2010 Ron McGill becomes President and Seniors unfortunately win wooden spoon for first time in history after losing up to twenty players from the previous season.
2011 Seniors break long losing streak against Moonee Valley. Ahmed Saad becomes first Roxburgh Park FC player to be drafted into the AFL when picked up by St Kilda.
2012 The club signs Clayton Football Club 2010 Premiership Assistant Coach Joel Ferguson as its Senior coach for two seasons. Although, clear signs of improvement, the club is relegated to a newly formed Division 2 after round 13. This third tier league comprises the bottom 6 teams of Division 1. Roxburgh Park seniors and reserves compete in first ever finals series. Dylan Boag wins his first Senior Best & Fairest, while star Full Back Kajan Gnanapiragasam and Senior Coach Joel Ferguson get selected in the Division 2 Team of the Year.
2013 After being in the top 4 for most of the year, the senior side miss out on finals by one game in a nail-biting finish to the season. 2014 Seniors play their first Grand Final, losing to East Keilor
2016 All three senior teams (Seniors, Reserves and Under 19s) made the grand final. Seniors again losing to East Keilor. The Under 19's also faced East Keilor in the grand final and lost. The Reserves won the club's first open age men's grand final, defeating Jacana. At the end of the season coach Paul Derrick left the club and was replaced by Travis McCarty
2017 The Reserves again win the grand final, this time defeating Coburg Districts. Travis McCarty was replaced as coach by Michael Farrelly
2018 The Reserves and Seniors both qualify for the grand final. After going through the season undefeated, the Reserves lost to Moonee Valley by 8 points. The Seniors faced East Sunbury and under first year coach Farrelly won the first senior flag for the club, defeating the Thunder by 6 points
2019 In the first season in Division 1, the club manage to win three games for the year, defeating Oak Park, Taylors Lakes and Hillside. The 3 wins help the club avoid relegation to Division 2 and maintain Division 1 status for another season. The club also re-signed coach Michael Farrelly for a further 2 seasons

== 2019 Teams ==
Seniors Division 1
Reserves Division 1
Women's
Under 19 Division 1
Youth Girls Division 2
Under 17 Division 2
Under 13 Division 4
Under 11 Division 3
Under 9

== AFL Players from Roxburgh Park Football Club ==
- Ahmed Saad – St Kilda
