= Glenroy Football Club =

Australian rules football club

Names
- Full name: Glenroy Football Club
- Nickname(s): The Roys, Wallabies
- Best and fairest: Julian Hemala

Club details
- Founded: 1946; 80 years ago
- Colours: Red White
- Competition: EDFL
- Coach: Addam Maric
- Captain: Tanner Nilsson
- Premierships: EDFL (14) 1949, 1951, 1963, 1966, 1974, 1980, 1982, 1983, 1983, 1985, 1986, 1997, 2008, 2017
- Ground: Sewell Reserve, Glenroy

Uniforms
Home	Away

Other information
- Official website: glenroyfc.com.au

Glenroy Football Club is an Australian rules football club located 14 km north of Melbourne in the suburb of Glenroy. The club was founded in 1946 and affiliated with the Essendon District Football League. The club fields open age and junior teams.

Glenroy are known as the Wallabies and wear a red jumper with a white sash. The club enjoys strong community support from a range of small businesses and institutions. Their last B-Grade premiership in 2008 resulted in their promotion to A-Grade under former premiership player Ash Manning. Due to a mass exodus of player personnel, Glenroy's young list struggled to match it with the hardened quality opposition in 2009. In 2010, former Northcote Park veteran Brett Jeffrey took the reins of player coach. The club had an up and down year, finally settling for 6th position and failing to make the finals. In 2012, former Carlton captain Lance Whitnall was appointed playing coach. In his second year he took Glenroy to the 2013 B grade Grand Final only to just fall short of winning the game.

== Senior Premierships (14) ==
- A Grade
  - 1966, 1982, 1983, 1986
- B Grade
  - 1949, 1951, 1974, 1980, 1997, 2008, 2017
- A3 Grade
  - 1983, 1985
- C Grade
  - 1963.

== VFL/AFL players ==
- Aaron Kite
- John O'Connell
- Lance Whitnall

== Sources ==
- Australian Football
- EDFL Website
- Footypedia
