= Buckley Park College =

Location
- Cooper Street; Essendon, Victoria, 3040; Australia; 37.7471°S 144.8973°E

Information
- Type: Secondary, coeducation, Victorian government state school
- Motto: Build Your Wings
- Established: 1963
- Principal: Harold Cheung
- Grades: 7–12
- Colours: Green, red, grey, white.
- Website: www.buckleyparkco.vic.edu.au

Buckley Park College is a medium-sized, public secondary school located in Essendon, Victoria, Australia. It has around 902 students from year 7–12. The current principal of the school is Harold Cheung.

== Notable alumni ==
- Callum Moore, Australian rules footballer
- Tash Sultana, musician
- Hannah Cross, synchronised swimmer
