= Tullamarine Football Club =

Tullamarine
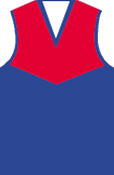

Names
- Full name: Tullamarine Football Club
- Nickname: The Demons

Club details
- Founded: 1974
- Colours: Navy blue and red
- Competition: Essendon District Football League
- President: Peter Labbad
- Coach: David Connell
- Captain: William Rioli
- Ground: Leo Dineen Reserve, Spring Street, Tullamarine

Other information
- Official website: http://www.tullamarinefc.org.au

Tullamarine Football Club is an Australian rules football club 17km north west of Melbourne in the suburb of Tullamarine. It is affiliated with the Essendon District Football League.

== History ==
Formed in 1974 and known as Essendon-Tullamarine after a merger between Essendon Baptist St John’s and Ascot Vale Presbyterians, Tullamarine achieved five successive A Grade flags between 1975 and 1979, an Essendon District Football League record which still stands. More recently, the club has had intermittent success. Successful Essendon footballers included Ron Evans, Ted Fordham, Ken Fraser and Don McKenzie. The club dropped Essendon from its name in 1981 and became Tullamarine F.C., winning its first B Grade premiership the same year.

Its colours are blue and red, and they are known as the Demons they have the same jumper and mascot as Melbourne Football Club. Tullamarine remained a strong force in the 1st division of the EDFL for much of the 2010s, with a brief and unsuccessful stint in the premier division in 2004. It enjoys strong junior and local support.

== Ground ==
Tullamarine's home ground has been Leo Dineen Reserve, in Spring Street, Tullamarine, since 1977.

== Premierships ==
A Grade
1975, 1976, 1977, 1978, 1979

B Grade
1981, 1993, 2003

B Reserves
1986, 1989, 1991, 1992

U18 B Grade Div 2
1980, 1983, 1988, 1991

U16 Div 1
1989

U16 Div 2
1979, 1986, 1987, 1988, 1990

U16 Div 3
2008

U14 Div 2
1993

U12 Div 2
1990, 2002

U10 Div 1
2003

U10 Div 2
1989, 2002

U10 Div 3
2014
