= Avondale Heights Football Club =

Names
- Full name: Avondale Heights Football Club
- Nickname: Heights

2025 season
- Home-and-away season: 4th
- Leading goalkicker: Nathan Foster (32 goals)

Club details
- Founded: 1965; 61 years ago
- Colours: Dark blue; White
- Competition: Essendon District Football League
- President: Charles Cuzzupi
- Coach: Andrew Kahofer
- Captain: Matt Cravino
- Premierships: 5 (1976, 1980, 1984, 1987, 2004)
- Ground: Canning Reserve, Avondale Heights

Uniforms
Home

Other information
- Official website: ahfc.org.au

The Avondale Heights Football Club, nicknamed the Heights, is a community Australian football club based in the north-western Melbourne suburb of Avondale Heights that competes in the Essendon District Football League (EDFL) Division 1, a suburban football competition in metropolitan Melbourne.

The club fields senior men’s and women’s teams, along with juniors. It is based at Avondale Heights (Canning Reserve), which serves as both its home ground and central training venue.

Avondale Heights Football Club has long been part of the strong local football network in Melbourne’s north-west corridor.

The club’s guernsey is traditionally navy blue with a white chevron.

== History ==
The club was founded as a junior club in September 1965, where a small group of locals met at St James Church in Macey Street to establish a club for the youth of Avondale Heights.

The first side to represent Avondale Heights in the Essendon District Football League was an Under-15 team in 1966. The average age of the team was 11, and it took six games for the first score, a behind, to be registered. The team managed five goals for the season. It was a tough time for the committee to get the players to away games.

In season 1967, the club fielded its first open-age team with a Thirds side. By 1972, the number of junior teams had increased to five and a senior and reserve side.

The club's first B-Grade senior premiership was in 1976. After being promoted to A-Grade in 1977, the club won their first A-Grade premiership in 1987

Season 2001 saw the club relegated back to B-Grade. This was on the back of severe financial losses that threatened the club's viability.

In 2004, the Seniors were Premiers and Champions of B-Grade (undefeated). The club fields teams from under-10s through to open-age.

== AFL players ==
- Matthew Lloyd – 270 games and a club-record 926 goals, including captain and Coleman Medallist with Essendon and induction to the Australian Football Hall of Fame
- Ken Mansfield – 48 games with Essendon 1976–80
- Peter Baxter – 23 games with Footscray 1985–88
- Brad Lloyd – 11 games with Hawthorn 1997–99
- Gary Barrow - 6 games with Footscray 1992-93

== Premierships ==
=== Senior ===
- A Grade (1): 1987
- B Grade (2): 1976, 2004
- A3 Grade (2): 1980, 1984

== Bibliography ==
- History of football in Melbourne's north west by John Stoward – ISBN 9780980592924
