= Hillside Football Club =

Australian rules football club

Hillside

Names
- Full name: Hillside Football Club
- Former name: Sydenham–Hillside
- Nickname: Sharks

Club details
- Founded: 1999; 27 years ago
- Colours: Teal; White; Black
- Competition: Essendon District Football League
- Premierships: EDFL Division 1 Reserves (1): 2019, 2023; EDFL Division 2 (1): 2013; EDFL Division 2 Reserves (2): 2012, 2013
- Grounds: Hillside Reserve, Hillside, Victoria
- Boronia Reserve, Hillside, Victoria

Uniforms
| Home | Away |

Other information
- Official website: thesharks.com.au

The Hillside Football Club, nicknamed the Sharks, is an Australian rules football club located in Hillside, Victoria, north west of Melbourne. The club originated in 1999 as the Sydenham–Hillside Football Club with the intention to field junior sides, and in 2005 established a senior side in the Essendon District Football League (EDFL).

Between 2005 and 2013, the Senior Men's team competed in Division 2, but was promoted to Division 1 after winning the Division 2 premiership, defeating Moonee Valley 22.13 (145) to 13.4 (82). Today, the club fields teams in Division 1 and Division 1 Reserves, in the Premier Division of the EDFL Women's competition, and a number of junior squads.

== Honours ==
Club premierships
| League | Competition | Wins | Year won |
| Essendon District Football League | Division 2 (C Grade) | 1 | 2013 |
| Essendon District Football League | Division 2 Reserves (C Grade Reserves) | 2 | 2012, 2013 |
