= Maribyrnong Park Football Club =

Maribyrnong Park

Names
- Full name: Maribyrnong Park Football Club
- Former name: Moonee Ponds Imperials Riverside Stars
- Nickname(s): Lions, Marby

Club details
- Founded: 1980
- Colours: Red, blue and yellow
- Competition: Essendon District Football League
- President: Luke Livingston (2026-present)
- Coach: Brodie Holland (2024-present)
- Captain: Alex Barba (2024-present)
- Premierships: 5 (1981, 2007, 2009, 2010, 2024)
- Ground: Maribyrnong Park, Moonee Ponds

Other information
- Official website: https://www.marby-lions.com/home.htm

Maribyrnong Park Football Club is an Australian rules football club located 7 km north west of Melbourne in the suburb of Moonee Ponds . The club was formed in 1980 from an amalgamation of Riverside Stars and Moonee Imperials football clubs who shared the same clubroom and played on adjacent ovals at Maribyrnong Park.The first (captain) coach was Russell Parker, who originally played at Montmorency Football Club for many years.

== 2006–2018 ==
In 2008, Maribyrnong Park made their much anticipated return to A Grade. In only their second season, the Lions defeated Greenvale to break a 26-year drought.

On 13 Sep 2009 the Maribyrnong Park Lions won the EDFL A Grade Grand Final – Maribyrnong Park 102 def Greenvale 84.

In 2010, Maribyrnong Park finished 4th at the end of the home and away season. They went on to defeat 3rd placed Oak Park then 2nd placed Keilor to advance to the Grand Final against Greenvale. On 12 Sep 2010, in a back to back as playing coach, Holland lead the Maribyrnong Park A Grade Seniors team to victory – Maribyrnong Park 90 def Greenvale 73.

== Recruited players to the AFL/VFL ==
- Rory Atkins – Adelaide Football Club
- Touk Miller – Gold Coast
- Luke Ryan – Fremantle Football Club
- Jack Bytel- St Kilda Saints
- Brandon Ryan - Hawthorn
- Brody Mihocek - Collingwood Football Club
- Harry O'Farrell - Carlton Football Club
