= West Coburg Football Club =

Australian rules football club

Names
- Full name: West Coburg Football Club
- Nickname: Burgers

Club details
- Founded: 1927; 99 years ago
- Colours
- Competition: Essendon District Football League
- Premierships: 22 (1937, 1938, 1939, 1940, 1941, 1949, 1953, 1958, 1963, 1965, 1966, 1967, 1968, 1970, 1971, 1977, 1987, 1991, 1996, 2000, 2006, 2014.)
- Ground: Shore Reserve, Pascoe Vale South, Coburg City Oval, Coburg

Uniforms
Home

Other information
- Official website: wcfc.com.au

The West Coburg Football Club is an Australian rules football club located 8 km north west of Melbourne in the suburb of Coburg. The club fields senior and junior teams in the Essendon District Football League (EDFL).

== History ==
The club is one of the oldest in the EDFL, founded in 1927, it soon found itself playing in the VFA Sub-District Association. It took a little time to settle then the club won five premierships in a row from 1937 to 1941. After the war the club again saluted in 1949 and 1953.

=== EDFL ===
In 1954 West Coburg transferred to the Essendon District Football League. The VFA Sub Districts had wounded up and the club needed a new competition. Coming from a strong standard competition the club was competitive by falling short in its debut season and gain in 1957.

West Coburg's first A Grade premiership was in 1965, defeating Aberfeldie, 5.6.36 to 4.7.31 in a low-scoring affair.

The club won four premierships across two Grades between 1965 and 1968.

== Senior Premierships ==
- VFA Sub-districts
  - 1937, 1938, 1939, 1940, 1941, 1949, 1953.
- Essendon District Football League A Grade (Premier Division)
  - 1965, 1967, 1968, 1970, 1971.
- Essendon District Football League B Grade (Division 1)
  - 1958, 1963, 1966, 1987, 1991, 1996, 2000, 2006, 2014, 2026.
- Essendon District Football League C Grade
  - 1977

== VFL/AFL players ==
- David Dench - North Melbourne
- Daryl O'Brien - North Melbourne
- Wes Lofts - Carlton
- Andrew Ukovic - Essendon, Collingwood
- John May - Essendon
- Phil Carlton - South Melbourne
- Brandon Ellis - Richmond
- Adam Saad - Gold Coast, Essendon, Carlton

== Books ==
- History of football in Melbourne's north west – John Stoward - ISBN 9780980592924
