= George Spero (footballer) =

Australian rules footballer

Personal information
- Full name: George Spero
- Born: 29 November 1941
- Died: 8 December 2022 (aged 81)
- Original team: Keilor
- Height: 183 cm (6 ft 0 in)
- Weight: 79 kg (174 lb)
- Position: Half-forward

Playing career^{1}
Years	Club	Games (Goals)
1960	Essendon	5 (0)
- ^{1} Playing statistics correct to the end of 1960.

George Spero (29 November 1941 – 8 December 2022) was an Australian rules footballer who played with Essendon in the Victorian Football League (VFL). He suffered a serious knee injury in his only senior VFL season and a year later he returned to his old club, Keilor. Spent six more seasons with Keilor before finishing his career with Tooberac.
