= Sunbury Kangaroos Football Club =

Sunbury Kangaroos

Names
- Full name: Sunbury Kangaroos Football Club
- Nickname(s): Kangaroos

Club details
- Founded: 1987
- Colours: Blue and White
- Competition: Essendon District Football League since 2019
- Premierships: 2012, 2019
- Ground(s): Eric Boardman Reserve Sunbury, Victoria

Other information
- Official website: www. sunburykangaroosjfc.org.au

The Sunbury Kangaroos Football Club,. nicknamed the Kangaroos, is an Australian rules football club, previously known as Sunbury Rovers and situated 40km north west of Melbourne in the town of Sunbury and affiliated with the Essendon District Football League.

== History ==
Originally known as the Sunbury Rovers, the team was formed so the town Sunbury had a team in both divisions of RDFL. Formed in 1987 to compete in the second division of the league. The Rovers always struggled because the better players would join the more established club, Fortunes improved when Sunbury FC left for the Ballarat Football League. The club changed to the Kangaroos after incentives from the North Melbourne Football Club to do so.

The Kangaroos joined EDFL Women's ranks in 2018 and performed well, now the men's teams transfer ensures that all the club's senior teams, including its Reserves and Under 19s, will play with the EDFL from 2019 onward.

== Premierships ==
- Riddell District Football League (1987-2018)
  - Seniors 2012
  - Reserves 2006, 2007, 2014, 2015, 2017
- Essendon District Football League (2019-)
  - Seniors 2019
  - Reserves 2019
