= Les Rennie =

Australian rules footballer, born 1908

Personal information
- Full name: Les Rennie
- Born: 21 September 1908
- Died: 25 September 1983 (aged 75)
- Height: 175 cm (5 ft 9 in)
- Weight: 68 kg (150 lb)

Playing career^{1}
| Years | Club | Games (Goals) |
| 1931 | Essendon | 13 (0) |
- ^{1} Playing statistics correct to the end of 1931.

Les Rennie (21 September 1908 – 25 September 1983) was an Australian rules footballer who played with Essendon in the Victorian Football League (VFL).
