= Aberfeldie Football Club =

Aberfeldie

Names
- Full name: Aberfeldie Sports Club
- Nickname: Abers

Club details
- Founded: 1948; 78 years ago
- Colours: Dark blue; Light blue
- Competition: Essendon District Football League
- Ground: Clifton Park, Aberfeldie

Uniforms
Home

Other information
- Official website: abers.com.au

Aberfeldie Sports Club is an Australian rules football and cricket club located 9 km north-west of Melbourne in the suburb of Aberfeldie which entered the Essendon District Football League in 1948.

== History ==
The ASC was formed in 1974 and wholly incorporated in 1981. Originally known as 'The Gorillas', the football team wore a navy blue guernsey with an ACC monogram in reference to the Aberfeldie Community Centre which began in 1944 and evolved into the humble beginnings of the football section. Recently, club historian Gary Wicking has pored over vintage newspapers on microfilm dating back over a hundred years and has determined that there was documented evidence of fore-runners of the current club as early as 1893 for both football and cricket in the district. The first team to represent the club under its inaugural banner was an Under 17's team in 1948, winning the Club’s first premiership in 1951.

The Senior club was established in 1950 winning the 1953 B-Grade premiership. The 1960s produced only one premiership, the Under 17's in 1966. After finishing second last in A-Grade in 1973 the club won the premiership in 1974. Several Grand Final appearances followed without success before being relegated to B-Grade in 1979. With Runners up in 1980 and 1981, the club won the B-Grade premiership in 1982 and promotion to A-Grade for 1983. Subsequently relegated back to B-Grade the club won the 1995 B-Grade premiership losing only one match for the season.

Now also commonly known by the nickname 'Abers', the club's original playing strip was retired in 1999 and the following year (2000) a new striking design was implemented. That strip featured the official club colours Sky Blue with a Navy Blue flash (or zig zag) on the front panel. Over the next few seasons, the junior section replicated the new strip for each under age group until all teams were identical. However, after 12 seasons with this strip the club reverted to its original sky blue and navy blue yoke jumper for Season 2012. And like its predecessor, the junior sections adopted this version from Season 2013.

Aberfeldie fielded 15 under age junior teams and in Season 2012 and ultimately, six of those teams won premierships which is an outstanding effort. The club's Under 18's which comes under the jurisdiction of Senior Football, won five consecutive premierships 2000–2004 which is an EDFL record for a single team and again in 2008 and 2012.

In Seasons 2013 and 2014, the club's senior teams, coached by former AFL premiership player Mal Michael, made their respective Grand Finals but lost both. With the appointment of Adam Potter as Coach for Season 2015, the team won all home and away matches and finals, including its the first senior premiership in 41 years. The Under 18 teams also concurrently won a premiership each (Premier Division and Division 2).

With Adam Potter continuing as Senior Coach again in 2016, the flagship senior team made it to the Grand Final but were beaten by Keilor Football Club. The Under 18 team won their fifth consecutive premiership in a row. All look forward to further success in Season 2017.

In 2017, the Essendon District Football League moved to an odd-numbered competition for all junior grades. This mechanism brings the EDFL in line with all other metropolitan Leagues across Melbourne. In a highly successful junior and senior season the Gorillas claimed the ultimate prize yet again despite losing several key players at the end of 2016. The much younger senior team claimed the club's second senior premiership in three years under Adam Potter with a dominant performance over Greenvale. In 2018 the senior team went back to back for the first time in the club's history with a convincing win over Keilor.

== Premierships ==
Premiers:

- A-Grade 1974, Premier Division 2015, 2017, & 2018. A-Reserves 1975, 1977, 2009 & 2019.
- B-Grade 1953, 1959, 1982, 1995. B-Reserves 1981.
- Under 18’s 1951, 1966, 1998, 2000, 2001, 2002, 2003, 2004, 2008, 2012, 2013, 2014, 2015, 2016, & 2018.
- Under 18 - Division 2 2015.
- Women's Premier Division 2019 2025
