= Aberfeldie =

- Suburb
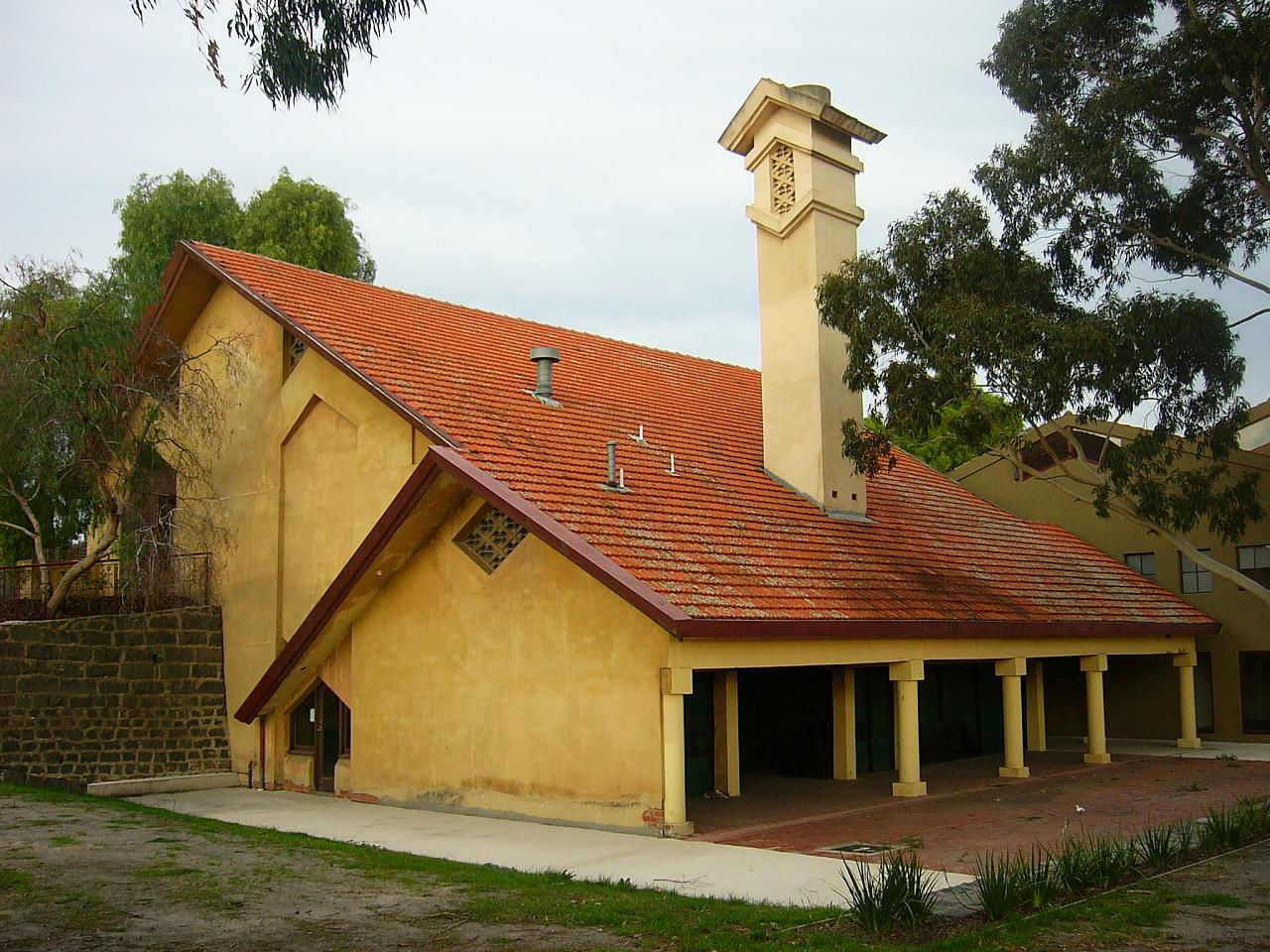
- Former Essendon Municipal Incinerator

- Interactive map of Aberfeldie
- Coordinates: 37.762°S 144.901°E
- Country: Australia
- State: Victoria
- City: Melbourne
- LGA: City of Moonee Valley
- Location: 9 km (5.6 mi) from Melbourne

Government
  - State electorate: Niddrie
  - Federal division: Maribyrnong

Area
  - Total: 1.57 km^{2} (0.61 sq mi)
- Elevation: 41 m (135 ft)

Population
  - Total: 3,925 (2021 census)
  - Density: 2,500/km^{2} (6,475/sq mi)
- Postcode: 3040
Suburbs around Aberfeldie
| Essendon West | Essendon | Essendon |
| Essendon West | Aberfeldie | Essendon, Moonee Ponds, |
| Maribyrnong | Maribyrnong | Moonee Ponds |

Aberfeldie is an inner suburb in Melbourne, Victoria, Australia, 8 km (5.0 mi) north-west of Melbourne's Central Business District, located within the City of Moonee Valley local government area. Aberfeldie recorded a population of 3,925 at the 2021 census.

Aberfeldie is bounded in the west by Afton Street, in the north by Buckley Street, in the east by Waverley Street and the edge of Aberfeldie Park, and in the south by the Maribyrnong River.

== History ==
Scotsman James Robertson named his property Aberfeldie, located on the corner of Aberfeldie Street and Park Crescent, after the town of Aberfeldy in Scotland. When the property was sold in 1888, it became the name of the suburb.

The Polish Catholic church on the corner of Alma Street and Aberfeldie Street was consecrated in 1973 by Cardinal Karol Wojtyla, who later became Pope John Paul II.

=== Heritage listings ===
The following places in Aberfeldie are listed on the Victorian Heritage Register:

- Clydebank, a former mansion now part of the Ave Maria College, at 22 Vida Street
- Walter Burley Griffin Incinerator, Essendon (former), at 180 Holmes Road

== Today ==
The area has tended to attract families, with its abundance of parks, sporting facilities, and the Maribyrnong River. There is a range of detached housing from inter-war California bungalows to post-war dwellings.

== Sport ==
Community groups have been active in the suburb since the start of the 20th century. Aberfeldie Bowls Club was established on 16 March 1910. In 1928 the Aberfeldie Progress Association joined with 6 other progress associations to form the Northern Districts Progress Cricket Association. In 1944 the Aberfeldie Community Centre was established to promote football, cricket, tennis, lawn bowls, gymnastics, swimming and basketball, as well as other social and cultural events.

This led to the formation of the Aberfeldie Sports Club (formed in 1974; incorporated in 1987) a family oriented club that began as a community-based sporting organisation in 1948 and today is the home of local grass-roots Australian Rules Football and cricket. It first entered a football team in the 1951 season. Aberfeldie Football Club is now part of the Essendon District Football League and the Aberfeldie Cricket Club is under the jurisdiction of the Victorian Turf Cricket Association and the North West Cricket Association.

The club's large junior base helps solidify them as one of the area's strongest local clubs.

== Educational facilities ==
Aberfeldie has one government primary school, Aberfeldie PS; two Catholic primary schools, Our Lady of Nativity PS and Resurrection School; and one Catholic secondary school for girls, Ave Maria College.

== Transport ==
The suburb is serviced by the following bus routes:

- 465 Essendon – Keilor Park via Buckley Street, Milleara Shopping Centre, Keilor East (every day), operated by CDC Melbourne, along Buckley Street
- 467: Moonee Ponds – Aberfeldie (every day), operated by CDC Melbourne, on the corner of Tilba Street and Brunel Street
- 468: Highpoint Shopping Centre – Essendon via Waverley Street (Monday to Saturday), operated by CDC Melbourne, along Buckley and Waverley streets
- 482: Essendon Fields – Essendon Fields Shopping Centre via Essendon, Essendon North, Moonee Ponds, (Monday - Saturday), operated by Kinetic Melbourne along Maribyrnong Road and Mount Alexander Road
- 903: Altona – Mordialloc via Essendon, Northland Shopping Centre, Box Hill, Chadstone Shopping Centre (every day), operated by Kinetic Melbourne, along Buckley Street.

== See also ==
- City of Essendon – Aberfeldie was previously within this former local government area.
