= Essendon District Football League =

Semi-professional Australian football league

- Sport: Australian rules football
- Founded: 1930; 96 years ago
- First season: 1930
- CEO: Andrew Johnston
- President: Bernie Shinners
- No. of teams: 37
- Country: Australia
- Most recent champions: D1: Strathmore; D2: West Coburg; D3: Westmeadows (2026)
- Most titles: Essendon Doutta Stars (20)
- Sponsor: Strathmore Community Bank
- Website: essendondfl.com.au

The Essendon District Football League (EDFL) is a semi-professional Australian rules football league competition based in Essendon, Victoria, consisting of teams based in the north-west suburbs of Melbourne. Founded in 1930, the men's competition consists of three divisions: Premier Division, Division 1 and Division 2, with 10 clubs in each division at present. While the women's competition consists of two divisions: Premier Division and Division 1 with 9 clubs and 12 clubs in each respectively.

Promotion and relegation between these divisions occurs, with the lowest-placed clubs in the Premier Division and Division 1 being relegated at the end of each season replaced in their respective divisions by the winners of Division 1 and Division 2 premierships respectively Each men's team also fields a reserves side and an under-18 side that play fixtures mirroring that of the senior side.

Since 2017, the league has also run a competition for women's Australian rules football. In its inaugural year, this was a joint competition featuring teams from the EDFL as well as the Western Region Football League (WRFL). In 2018, 13 teams competed in a single division season, expanding to 19 teams and two divisions in 2019. Several EDFL clubs set up women's sides to compete in the NFNL prior to this league being set up including Keilor, Pascoe Vale and Deer Park.

The league consists of clubs spanning as far north as Sunbury (East Sunbury Football Club), as far south-east as Moonee Ponds (Moonee Valley), and as far west as Hillside (Hillside Football Club). The furthest distance between two clubs is Moonee Valley Football Club and Sunbury Kangaroos totalling a travel distance of 35.2 km.

A number of junior players from the EDFL play for Calder Cannons in the Coates Talent League due to the geography of being based at Highgate Recreation Reserve, Craigieburn and consequently receiving the majority of players from teams in the Northern and North-West Suburbs. A smaller number of players represent Western Jets, being based at Burbank Oval, Williamstown which receive a number of players from clubs based in the western suburbs of Melbourne.

The men's competition is set for a restructure in the 2027 season as Parkside Football Club have completed a transfer from the WFNL to the EDFL, and will absorb Ascot Vale's junior teams in doing so. It is yet to be confirmed which division they will be placed in. Additionally, current thirds only clubs Hume Bombers and Merrifield Panthers are expected to capitalise on the growth of Melbourne's outer north and seek to join the EDFL senior competitions in coming years.

== Clubs ==
Location of 2025 EDFL clubs
A blue label denotes the club is in the Premier Division, a red label denotes the club is in Division One, a yellow label denotes the club is in Division Two, and a black label denotes the club competes in junior competitions only.

The league consists of clubs spanning as far north as Sunbury (Rupertswood), as far south as Ascot Vale (Ascot Vale) or Moonee Ponds (Moonee Valley) at a senior level, as far east as Coburg (Coburg) or Fawkner (Northern Saints), and as far west as Hillside (Hillside Football Club). The furthest distance between two clubs is Moonee Valley Football Club and Sunbury Kangaroos totalling a travel distance of 35.2 km.

The league borders the RDFNL to the north and north-west, WFNL to the south and west, and the NFNL to the east and north-east. A number of clubs have transferred to and from these various leagues throughout their respective existences.

The league recruits a number of current players listed on VFL lists from the Northern and Western Suburbs of Melbourne, such as Coburg, Essendon, Werribee, and Williamstown

=== Premier Division ===
Club	Colours	Moniker	Home venue	Former league(s)	Est.	Years in EDFL	EDFL Premierships^{*Premier ^Division 1} ^{+Division 2}	
Club	Colours	Moniker	Home venue	Former league(s)	Est.	Years in EDFL	Total	Most recent
Aberfeldie		Abers, Gorillas	Clifton Park, Aberfeldie	—	1948	1948–	8	2018*
Deer Park		Lions	John McLeod Reserve, Deer Park	WRFL	1925	2023–	1	2023^{^}
Essendon Doutta Stars		Stars	Nipper Jordan Oval, Essendon	VFL	1946	1946–	20	2015^{^}
Greenvale		Jets	Greenvale Recreation Reserve, Greenvale	—	1990	1996–	5	2013*
Hillside		Sharks	Hillside Reserve, Hillside	—	1999	2005–	2	2025^{^}
Keilor		Blues	Keilor Recreation Reserve, Keilor	KBFL	1877	1932–	12	2024*
Maribyrnong Park		Lions	Maribyrnong Park, Moonee Ponds	—	1980	1980–	5	2024^{^}
Pascoe Vale		Panthers	Raeburn Reserve, Pascoe Vale	VFL SD	1918	1952–	3	2011^{^}
Strathmore		Mores	Lebanon Reserve, Strathmore	—	1954	1957–	12	2026*
West Coburg		Burgers	Shore Reserve, Pascoe Vale South	VFA SD	1927	1954–	17	2026^

=== Division 1 ===
Club	Colours	Moniker	Home venue	Former league(s)	Est.	Years in EDFL	EDFL Premierships^{*Premier ^Division1} ^{+Division 2}	
Club	Colours	Moniker	Home venue	Former league(s)	Est.	Years in EDFL	Total	Most recent
Airport West		Eagles	Hansen Reserve, Airport West	—	1961	1962–	7	2022^{^}
Avondale Heights		Heights	Canning Reserve, Avondale Heights	—	1965	1967–	5	2004^{^}
Craigieburn		Eagles	D.S. Aitken Reserve, Craigieburn	RDFNL	1970	2001–	3	2019^{^}
Moonee Valley		Valley	Ormond Park, Moonee Ponds	—	1933	1933–	7	2021^{+}
Oak Park		Kangaroos	J.P. Fawkner Reserve, Oak Park	—	1957	1960–	5	2023^{+}
Parkside		Magpies	Henry Turner Reserve, Footscray	WFNL	1897	2027–	0	__
Rupertswood		Sharks	Salesian College, Sunbury	RDFNL	1984	2021–	1	2025^{+}
St Albans		Saints	Kings Park Reserve, Kings Park	WRFL	1947	2023–	0	__
Taylors Lakes		Lions	Lionheart Reserve, Taylors Lakes	—	1989	1993–	2	2024^{+}
Tullamarine (Essendon-Tullamarine 1974–80)		Demons	Leo Dineen Reserve, Tullamarine	—	1974	1974–	8	2003^{^}
Westmeadows		Tigers	Willowbrook Reserve, Westmeadows	—	1970	1977–	2	2026*

=== Division 2 ===
Club	Colours	Moniker	Home venue	Former league(s)	Est.	Years in EDFL	EDFL Premierships^{*Premier ^Division1 +Division 2}	
Club	Colours	Moniker	Home venue	Former league(s)	Est.	Years in EDFL	Total	Most recent
Burnside Heights		Bears	Burnside Heights Recreation Reserve, Burnside Heights	—	2012	2014–	0	—
Coburg Districts		Lions	Cole Reserve, Pascoe Vale	NMFL, WRFL	1951	1981–1987, 2013–	0	—
East Sunbury		Thunder	John McMahon Reserve, Sunbury	RDFNL	1999	2013–2021, 2023–	0	—
East Keilor		Cougars	Overland Reserve, East Keilor	—	1967	1971–	7	2021^{^}
Glenroy		Wallabies	Sewell Reserve, Glenroy	—	1946	1946–	14	2017^{^}
Hadfield		Hawks	Martin Reserve, Hadfield	—	1961	1971–	4	2015^{+}
Keilor Park		Devils	Keilor Park Recreational Reserve, Keilor Park	—	1974	1986–2017, 2019–	3	2022^{+}
Northern Saints		Saints	Charles Mutton Reserve, Fawkner	—	2007	2008–	1	2013^{^}
Roxburgh Park		Magpies	Lakeside Resereve, Roxburgh Park	—	2002	2005–	1	2018^{+}
Sunbury Kangaroos		Kangaroos	Eric Boardman Reserve, Sunbury	RDFNL	1987	2019–	1	2019^{+}

=== Thirds only ===
Club	Colours	Moniker	Home venue	Former league(s)	Est.	Years in EDFL	Premierships	
Club	Colours	Moniker	Home venue	Former league(s)	Est.	Years in EDFL	Total	Most recent
Hume		Bombers	Kalkallo Reserve, Kalkallo	—	2018	2025–	0	—
Merrifield		Panthers	Merrifield Recreation Reserve, Mickleham	—	2024	2025–	0	—

Active AFL players
Player	AFL club/clubs	EDFL club/clubs	Year drafted	Draft pick no.	AFL games^{1}
Rory Atkins	Adelaide Football Club and Gold Coast Suns	Maribyrnong Park	2012	81	133
Noah Balta	Richmond Football Club	Essendon Doutta Stars	2017	25	85
Mark Blicavs	Geelong Football Club	Taylors Lakes and Sunbury Lions	2012	54 (R)	246
Jack Bytel	St Kilda Football Club	Maribyrnong Park and Aberfeldie	2018	41	22
Jordan Croft	Western Bulldogs	Maribyrnong Park	2023	15 (F-S)	0
Paul Curtis	North Melbourne Football Club	Keilor	2021	35	36
Joe Daniher	Essendon Football Club and Brisbane Lions	Aberfeldie	2012	10 (F-S)	172
Jayden Davey	Essendon Football Club	Moonee Valley	2022	54 (F-S)	0
Brandon Ellis	Richmond Football Club and Gold Coast Suns	West Coburg	2011	15	241
Hugo Garcia	St Kilda Football Club	Taylors Lakes and Greenvale	2023	50	0
Luke Grego	West Coast Eagles	Keilor	2024	48	0
Nick Hind	St Kilda Football Club and Essendon Football Club	Keilor	2018	54	80
Isaac Kako	Essendon Football Club	Northern Saints and Pascoe Vale	2024	13	0
Buku Khamis	Western Bulldogs	St Albans	2018	Category B Rookie	10
Jayden Laverde	Essendon Football Club	Keilor	2014	20	110
Keighton Matofai-Forbes	Geelong Football Club	Hillside, Burnside, Keilor	2024	69	0
Matthew McLeod-Allison	St Kilda Football Club	Strathmore	2020	26	0
Jake Melksham	Essendon Football Club and Melbourne Football Club	2009	10	221	
Brody Mihocek	Collingwood Football Club	Maribyrnong Park	2018	22 (R)	126
Touk Miller	Gold Coast Suns	Maribyrnong Park	2014	29	173
Reilly O'Brien	Adelaide Football Club	Moonee Valley	2014	9 (R)	100
Harry O'Farrell	Carlton Football Club	Maribyrnong Park	2024	40	0
Dion Prestia	Gold Coast Suns and Richmond Football Club	Greenvale	2010	9	212
Cameron Rayner	Brisbane Lions	Hillside and Essendon Doutta Stars	2017	1	111
Brandon Ryan	Hawthorn Football Club and Brisbane Lions	Maribyrnong Park and Aberfeldie	2012	12 (M-S) (R)	3
Luke Ryan	Fremantle Football Club	Moonee Valley and Maribyrnong Park	2016	66	132
Adam Saad	Gold Coast Suns, Essendon Football Club and Carlton Football Club	West Coburg	2015	25 (R)	177
James Sicily	Hawthorn Football Club	Keilor	2013	56	134
Joel Smith	Melbourne Football Club	Maribyrnong Park and Taylors Lakes	2014	41 (R)	42
Curtis Taylor	North Melbourne Football Club	Keilor and Rupertswood	2018	46	57
Zac Taylor	Adelaide Football Club	2021	44	0	
Rhylee West	Western Bulldogs	Strathmore	2018	26 (F-S)	25
Peter Wright	Gold Coast Suns and Essendon Football Club	Moonee Valley	2014	8	

Active AFLW players
Player	AFLW club/clubs	EDFL club/clubs	Year drafted	Draft pick no.	AFLW games^{1}
Alana Barba	Gold Coast Suns and Essendon Football Club	Roxburgh Park and Pascoe Vale	2022	–	12
Charlotte Baskaran	Hawthorn Football Club	Aberfeldie	2022	9	10
Lauren Caruso	Richmond Football Club	Keilor	2022	–	1
Monique Conti	Western Bulldogs and Richmond Football Club	Essendon Doutta Stars, Melbourne Uni and Aberfeldie	2017	4	61
Sarah Dargan	Collingwood Football Club, Richmond Football Club and Sydney Football Club	Strathmore and Pascoe Vale	2017	20	34
Zali Friswell	Geelong Football Club	Aberfeldie	2021	7	30
Elisabeth Georgostathis	Western Bulldogs	VU Western Spurs	2019	9	34
Tahlia Gillard	Melbourne Football Club	Moonee Valley and Essendon Doutta Stars	2021	42	28
Montana Ham	Sydney Football Club	Hillside and Keilor	2022	1	
Isabel Huntington	Western Bulldogs and Greater Western Sydney Giants	Melbourne Uni	2017	1	20
Madeline Keryk	Carlton Football Club, Geelong Football Club and Port Adelaide Football Club	Aberfeldie and VU Western Spurs	2016	115	47
Abbey McDonald	Geelong Football Club	Aberfeldie, Sunbury Kangaroos and Sunbury Lions	2022	55	4
Georgia Patrikios	St Kilda Football Club	West Coburg and Pascoe Vale	2019	5	35
Krstel Petrevski	Melbourne Football Club and West Coast Eagles	Pascoe Vale	2019	78	10
Georgie Prespakis	Geelong Football Club	Sunbury Lions	2021	2	19
Maddy Prespakis	Carlton Football Club and Essendon Football Club	Sunbury Lions	2018	3	55
Amelia Radford	Essendon Football Club	Moonee Valley	2022	–	7
Tahlia Read	Fremantle Football Club and Carlton Football Club	Maribyrnong Park	2022	85	0
Nicola Stevens	Collingwood Football Club, Carlton Football Club and St Kilda Football Club	Pascoe Vale	2016	6	59
Emelia Yassir	Richmond Football Club	Pascoe Vale	2021	16	19

Notes
(R) denotes that the player was selected in the rookie draft.
(F-S) denotes that the player was selected as a father-son pick.
(M-S) denotes that the player was selected in the mid-season draft.
^{1} Playing statistics correct as of the end of the 2023 season.

== Former clubs ==
Club	Colours	Nickname	Home ground	Former league	Est.	EDFL seasons	EDFL Senior Premierships		Fate
Club	Colours	Nickname	Home ground	Former league	Est.	EDFL seasons	Total	Most recent	Fate
All Nations Youth Club			Maribyrnong Reserve, Maribyrnong			1953–1955	0	–	Unknown
Ascot Imperials						1946	0	–	Unknown
Ascot Rovers			Fairbairn Park No. 2, Ascot Vale			1954–1956	0	–	Unknown
Ascot Vale		Devils	Walter Reserve, Ascot Vale	–	1930	1930–1987	11	1977	Moved to Footscray Districts FL after 1987 season.
Ascot Vale Juniors			Ascot Vale Park, Ascot Vale		1925	?	0	–	Unknown
Ascot Vale Methodists					1930	1946, 1949	0	–	Unknown
Ascot Vale Presbyterians			Fairbairn Park, Ascot Vale	–		1964–1973	1	1964	Merged with Essendon Baptist-St John's after 1973 season to form Essendon-Tullamarine
Ascot Vale United					1935	?	0	–	Unknown
Ascot Vale Wanderers					1933	1937–1940	0	–	Unknown
Ascot Vale West					1938	?	0	–	Unknown
Ascot Youth Centre			Walter Street Reserve, Ascot Vale	–	1950	1950	0	–	Unknown
Australian National Airways			Oval was located on current site of Penola Catholic College, William Street, Glenroy	–	1941	1941, 1949	0	–	Unknown
Broadmeadows						1946–1947	0	–	?
Brunswick City		Eagles	Dunstan Reserve, Brunswick West	–	1948	1948–1986	3	1980	Folded at the end of 1986 season
Brunswick Colts		Colts				1950	0	–	Unknown
Brunswick Presbyterians					1932	1974	0	–	Unknown
Brunswick Sons of Soldiers					1920	1936, 1947	0	–	Unknown
Brunswick United					1945	1947	0	–	Unknown
Catholic Boys Club			Various		1935	?	0	–	Unknown
Coburg Amateurs		Swans	De Chene Reserve, Coburg	VAFA	1920s	1941	0	–	Returned to VAFA in 1942
Coburg City			Coburg City Oval, Coburg		1945	?	0	–	Unknown
Coburg Rovers					1896	1940–1941	0	–	Unknown
Coburg Sons of Soldiers					1920	1937–1940	0	–	Unknown
Coburg South						1941	0	–	Unknown
Coburg Stars					1935	1950–1954	0	–	Unknown
Corpus Christi			Various		1950	?	0	–	Unknown. Active during 1980s as a junior club.
Don Rovers			Various			1936–1939	0	–	Unknown
East Brunswick		Magpies	Fleming Park, Brunswick East	MFL	1922	1975–1982	0	–	Transferred to YCW Football League in 1983
East Coburg			McDonald Reserve, Coburg		1935	?	0	–	Unknown. Played as a junior club.
East Essendon					1925	?	0	–	Unknown
Essendon All Blacks					1940	1950	0	–	Unknown
Essendon Baptist			Fairbairn Park, Ascot Vale		1935	1949–1950	0	–	Merged with St John's to form Essendon Baptist-St John's in 1951
Essendon Baptist-St John's				–	1951	1951–1973	4	1965	Merged with Ascot Vale Presbyterians at conclusion of 1973 season to form Essendon-Tullamarine.
Essendon Bombers		Bombers	Essendon Recreation Reserve, Essendon		1930	1950–1955	0	–	Unknown
Essendon Church of Christ				–	1940	1940	0	–	Unknown
Essendon Grammar Old Boys			Essendon Grammar School Oval, Essendon		1925	?	0	–	Unknown
Essendon High School Old Boys			Essendon High School Oval, Essendon		1930	?	0	–	Unknown
Essendon High School Ex Students		Panthers	Aberfeldie Park, Aberfeldie	–	1940s	1949–1982	2	1965	Moved to Footscray Districts FL in 1983
Essendon Holy Trinity			Holy Trinity Reserve		1930	?	0	–	Unknown
Essendon Imperials					1935	1937–1940	0	–	Unknown
Essendon Returned Soldiers					1920	1946	0	–	Unknown
Essendon Sons of Soldiers					1920	1936	0	–	Was formerly Pascoe Vale Panthers/Essendon Bombers 3rd side. Unknown why it discontinued.
Essendon Stars				–	1940	1940	0	–	Unknown
Essendon Swimmers					1935	1950–1951	0	–	Unknown
Essendon United						1936–1940	0	–	Unknown
Essendon Youth Centre					1950	1975–1982	2	1981	Merged with Moonee Ponds to form Aberfeldie Park in 1983
Fairbairn Rovers			Fairbairn Park, Ascot Vale			1950	0	–	Unknown
Fairbairn Socials			Fairbairn Park, Ascot Vale			1938	0	–	Unknown
Fawkner (Fawkner Districts 1937–41)						1937–1941, 1946–1952	0	–	Folded in 1952
Flemington			Flemington Park, Flemington		1930	?	0	–	Unknown
Flemington/Kensington					1925	1930–1938	0	–	Unknown
Footscray Amateurs			Footscray Park, Footscray		1940	?	0	–	Unknown
Footscray Technical College					1940	1963	0	–	Unknown
Gladstone Park		Burras	Tullamarine Reserve, Tullamarine	–	1976	1978–1997	1	1982	Transferred to Western Region FL in 1998
Glenbervie				–	1952	1952–1955	0	–	Unknown
Jacana		Jaguars	Jacana Reserve, Jacana	RDFNL	1961	2001–2022	1	2017	Entered recess prior to 2023
Keilor Regal Sports					1950	?	0	–	Unknown
Kensington					1935	?	0	–	Unknown
Kensington Methodists				–	1930	1930	0	–	Unknown
Knox Presbyterians					1935	1949	0	–	Unknown
La Mascotte						1938–1941	2	1941	Played until EDFL suspended competition due to WW2 in 1942. They did not reform when the EDFL resumed in 1946.
Lincoln Rovers			Lincoln Park, Essendon		1935	1949	0	–	Unknown
Lincoln Stars		Stars	Lincoln Park, Essendon		1940	1950–?	1	1955	Unknown
Lincoln Tigers		Tigers	Lincoln Park, Essendon		1945	1950–1951	1	1950	Unknown
Maribyrnong-Ascot United (Ascot United)					1930	1946–1950	0	–	Unknown
Maribyrnong Regal Sport					1945	?	0	–	Unknown
Maribyrnong Youth Club					1955	?	0	–	Unknown
Marrows						1950–1957	0	–	Unknown
Meadow Heights		Kangaroos	John Ilhan Memorial Reserve, Meadow Heights	–	1997	1997–2003	0	–	Folded after 2003 season
Monash Rovers						1950–1951	0	–	Unknown
Moonee Ponds			Moonee Ponds Reserve, Moonee Ponds		1930	?	0	–	Unknown
Moonee Imperials		Imperials	Maribyrnong Park, Moonee Ponds	–	1946	1946–1979	3	1962	Merged with Riverside Stars at conclusion of 1979 season to form Maribyrnong Park.
Moonee Ponds (Aberfeldie Park 1983–86)	(1978–82, 1986–89)(1983–85)	Bears	Aberfeldie Park, Aberfeldie	YCWFL		1978–1989	1	1979	Merged with Essendon Youth Centre to form Aberfeldie Park in 1983. Folded after 1989 season
Moonee Valley Imperials						?	0	–	Unknown
Moonee Valley Juniors					1955	?	0	–	Unknown
North Coburg (St Oliver's 1978–89)	(?-2000s)(?-2007)	Saints	Hosken Reserve, Coburg North	–	1947	1978–2007	0	–	Merged with Fawkner Park after 2007 season to form Northern Saints
Northcote Excelsior						1939	0	–	Unknown
North Essendon			Cross Keys Reserve, Essendon		1928	?	0	–	Unknown
North Essendon Methodists			Cross Keys Reserve, Essendon			1949–?	2	1961	Unknown
Northern Juniors			Various	–	1930	1930	0	–	Unknown
Northern Rovers			Various			1941	0	–	Unknown
North Melbourne City			North Melbourne Recreation Reserve, North Melbourne		1945	?	0	–	Unknown
Old Coburgians				–	1940	1940	0	–	Unknown
Old Essendon Grammarians		Grammar		–	1968	1968–1969, 1972–1982	1	1976	Transferred to Footscray Districts FL after 1982 season
Parkville					1935	?	0	–	Unknown
Regal Sports			Various			1934	0	–	Unknown
Riverside Stars		Stars	Maribyrnong Park, Moonee Ponds	–	1946	1946–1979	2	1972	Merged with Moonee Imperials at conclusion of 1979 season to form Maribyrnong Park.
Royal Park			Royal Park, Parkville		1930	1979–1980	0	–	Merged with Batman, who was in recess after the demise of the NMFL, to form Coburg Districts in 1981
South Kensington					1930	1931	0	–	Unknown
St Andrews		Saints	Brearley Reserve, Pascoe Vale South		1940	1980–1985	0	–	Moved to VAFA following 1985 season
St Bernards			Various		1935	?	0	–	Unknown
St Bernards Juniors			Various		1945	?	0	–	Unknown
St Christophers			St Christopher's Primary School, Airport West			1974–1976	0	–	Merged with Airport West after 1976 season
St Davids					1935	1952	1	1952	Renamed as Royal Park
St Francis			Oak Park Reserve, Oak Park			?	0	–	Senior club folded, junior club still active
St Johns			Various	–	1930	1930	0	–	Unknown
St Monicas CYMS			Various			1937–1938	0	–	Unknown
St Patricks			Various		1935	1938	0	–	Unknown
St Pauls			Various		1940	1947	0	–	Unknown
Strathmore Stars			Fairbairn Park, Ascot Vale		1945	1954	0	–	Unknown
Vespa			Various		1950	1959–1961	0	–	Unknown
West Brunswick		Magpies	McAlister Oval, Parkville	VAFA	1930	1949–1958	0	–	Moved to VAFA in 1959
West Brunswick Laurels					1940	?	0	–	Unknown
West Coburg Amateurs					1955	1959	0	–	Unknown
West Coburg (2)					1958	?	0	–	Unknown
West Coburg Juniors					1960	?	0	–	Unknown
West Essendon					1930	?	0	–	Unknown
West Essendon Youth Centre					1955	?	0	–	Unknown
West Melbourne			West Melbourne Reserve, West Melbourne		1940	?	0	–	Unknown
West Moreland			Various			1937–1940	0	–	Unknown
Woodlands			Holmes Road Reserve, Moonee Ponds			1930–1934	3	1934	Folded after 1934

Notes
^{†} denotes that the club did not participate between 1942 and 1945 due to World War II.

Aside from the clubs mentioned in the table above, the EDFL 75th Anniversary History Book also listed the following clubs as having been affiliated with the EDFL between 1930 and 2005

- 6th Melbourne Scouts
- Ascot Rovers/Maribyrnong
- Ford Company
- Tullamarine-Airport West

== Premiers ==
	Seniors			Reserves		
Year	Premier Division (A Grade)	Division 1 (B Grade)	Division 2 (C Grade)	Premier Division (A Grade)	Division 1 (B Grade)	Division 2 (C Grade)
2026	Strathmore	West Coburg	Westmeadows	Aberfeldie	West Coburg	Coburg Districts
2025	Strathmore	Hillside	Rupertswood	Keilor	Hillside	Coburg Districts
2024	Keilor	Maribyrnong Park	Taylors Lakes	Keilor	West Coburg	Northern Saints
2023	Keilor	Deer Park	Oak Park	Strathmore	Hillside	Northern Saints
2022	Strathmore	Airport West	Keilor Park	Keilor	Airport West	Keilor Park
2021	Strathmore	East Keilor	Moonee Valley	Keilor	East Keilor	Moonee Valley
2020	Competition not held due to COVID-19 pandemic					
2019	Keilor	Craigieburn	Sunbury Kangaroos	Aberfeldie	Hillside	Sunbury Kangaroos
2018	Aberfeldie	Airport West	Roxburgh Park	Greenvale	Airport West	Moonee Valley
2017	Aberfeldie	Glenroy	Jacana	Greenvale	Taylors Lakes	Roxburgh Park
2016	Keilor	Craigieburn	East Keilor	Keilor	Taylors Lakes	Roxburgh Park
2015	Aberfeldie	Essendon Doutta Stars	Hadfield	Keilor	Taylors Lakes	Coburg Districts
2014	Strathmore	West Coburg	East Keilor	Greenvale	Taylors Lakes	Moonee Valley
2013	Greenvale	Northern Saints	Hillside	Greenvale	West Coburg	Hillside
2012	Greenvale	Airport West	East Keilor	Greenvale	Airport West	Hillside
2011	Strathmore	Pascoe Vale	Competition in recess	Oak Park	Airport West	Competition in recess
2010	Maribyrnong Park	Taylors Lakes	Competition in recess	Greenvale	Pascoe Vale	Competition in recess
2009	Maribyrnong Park	Oak Park	Competition in recess	Aberfeldie	Airport West	Competition in recess
2008	Keilor	Glenroy	Competition in recess	Keilor	Taylors Lakes	Competition in recess
2007	Greenvale	Maribyrnong Park	Competition in recess	Greenvale	Maribyrnong Park	Competition in recess
2006	Strathmore	West Coburg	Competition in recess	Essendon Doutta Stars	Maribyrnong Park	Competition in recess
2005	Strathmore	Craigieburn	Competition in recess	Keilor	Craigieburn	Competition in recess
2004	Greenvale	Avondale Heights	Competition in recess	Oak Park	West Coburg	Competition in recess
2003	Oak Park	Tullamarine	Competition in recess	Oak Park	Westmeadows	Competition in recess
2002	Oak Park	Greenvale	Competition in recess	Oak Park	Craigieburn	Competition in recess
2001	Keilor	West Coburg	Competition in recess	Keilor	Pascoe Vale	Competition in recess
2000	Keilor	Moonee Valley	Competition in recess	Keilor	Pascoe Vale	Competition in recess
1999	Doutta Stars	Doutta Stars	Competition in recess	Keilor	Moonee Valley	Competition in recess
1998	Strathmore	Glenroy	Competition in recess	Strathmore	Essendon Doutta Stars	Competition in recess
1997	Keilor	West Coburg	Competition in recess	Strathmore	Hadfield	Competition in recess
1996	Keilor	Aberfeldie	Competition in recess	Strathmore	Pascoe Vale	Competition in recess
1995	Keilor	Moonee Valley	Competition in recess	Keilor	Pascoe Vale	Competition in recess
1994	East Keilor	Tullamarine	Competition in recess	Oak Park	Essendon Doutta Stars	Competition in recess
1993	Airport West	East Keilor	Competition in recess	Airport West	North Coburg Saints	Competition in recess
1992	Airport West	West Coburg	Competition in recess	Oak Park	Tullamarine	Competition in recess
1991	Essendon Doutta Stars	Keilor Park	Competition in recess	Essendon Doutta Stars	Tullamarine	Competition in recess
1990	Essendon Doutta Stars	Hadfield	Competition in recess	Keilor	Keilor Park	Competition in recess
1989	Strathmore	Pascoe Vale	Competition in recess	Keilor	Tullamarine	Competition in recess
1988	Keilor	West Coburg	Competition in recess	Essendon Doutta Stars	Hadfield	Competition in recess
1987	Avondale Heights	Moonee Valley	Competition in recess	Keilor	West Coburg	Competition in recess
1986	Glenroy	Airport West	Competition in recess	Strathmore	Tullamarine	Competition in recess
1985	Keilor	Westmeadows	Competition in recess	Strathmore	Moonee Valley	Competition in recess
1984	Strathmore	Oak Park	Competition in recess	Strathmore	Ascot Vale	Competition in recess
1983	Glenroy	Oak Park	Competition in recess	Oak Park	Oak Park	Competition in recess
1982	Glenroy	Aberfeldie	Gladstone Park	Glenroy	Oak Park	Essendon High School Ex-Students
1981	Strathmore	Tullamarine	Essendon Youth Centre	West Coburg	Aberfeldie	Gladstone Park
1980	Essendon Doutta Stars	Glenroy	Brunswick City^{7}	West Coburg	Glenroy	St Andrews
1979	Essendon Tullamarine	Hadfield	Moonee Ponds	Essendon Doutta Stars	Oak Park	Competition not yet formed
1978	Essendon Tullamarine	East Keilor	Brunswick City^{7}	Pascoe Vale	Oak Park	Competition not yet formed
1977	Essendon Tullamarine	Ascot Vale	West Coburg	Aberfeldie	Ascot Vale	Competition not yet formed
1976	Essendon Tullamarine	Avondale Heights	Old Essendon Gramarians^{6}	Airport West	Ascot Vale	Competition not yet formed
1975	Essendon Tullamarine	Moonee Valley	Essendon Youth Centre	Aberfeldie	Oak Park	Competition not yet formed
1974	Aberfeldie	Glenroy	Brunswick Presbyterians	Strathmore	Glenroy	Competition not yet formed
1973	Keilor	Strathmore	Tullamarine Ascot Presbyterians^{1}	Essendon Doutta Stars	Brunswick City	Competition not yet formed
1972	Essendon Doutta Stars	Ascot Vale^{1}	Riverside Stars^{4}	Essendon Doutta Stars	Competition not yet formed	Competition not yet formed
1971	West Coburg	Strathmore	Hadfield	Essendon Baptist St John's ^{1}	Competition not yet formed	Competition not yet formed
1970	West Coburg	Broadmeadows	Moonee Valley	Pascoe Vale	Competition not yet formed	Competition not yet formed
1969	Essendon Doutta Stars	Ascot Vale^{1}	St. Davids	Pascoe Vale	Competition not yet formed	Competition not yet formed
1968	West Coburg	Keilor	Batman^{5}	West Coburg	Competition not yet formed	Competition not yet formed
1967	West Coburg	Strathmore	Riverside Stars^{4}	Pascoe Vale	Competition not yet formed	Competition not yet formed
1966	Glenroy	West Coburg	Ascot Youth Centre	Competition not yet formed	Competition not yet formed	Competition not yet formed
1965	West Coburg	Essendon High School Ex-Students	Essendon Baptist St John's^{1}	Competition not yet formed	Competition not yet formed	Competition not yet formed
1964	Essendon Doutta Stars	Ascot Vale Presbyterians	Pascoe Vale	Competition not yet formed	Competition not yet formed	Competition not yet formed
1963	Essendon Doutta Stars	West Coburg	Glenroy	Competition not yet formed	Competition not yet formed	Competition not yet formed
1962	Essendon Doutta Stars	Broadmeadows	Moonee Imperials^{4}	Competition not yet formed	Competition not yet formed	Competition not yet formed
1961	Essendon Doutta Stars	North Essendon Methodists	Doutta Stars	Competition not yet formed	Competition not yet formed	Competition not yet formed
1960	Moonee Imperials	Essendon High School Ex-Students	Competition not yet formed	Competition not yet formed	Competition not yet formed	Competition not yet formed
1959	Essendon Doutta Stars	Aberfeldie	Competition not yet formed	Competition not yet formed	Competition not yet formed	Competition not yet formed
1958	Essendon Baptist St John's^{1}	West Coburg	Competition not yet formed	Competition not yet formed	Competition not yet formed	Competition not yet formed
1957	Essendon Doutta Stars	North Essendon Methodists	Competition not yet formed	Competition not yet formed	Competition not yet formed	Competition not yet formed
1956	Brunswick City^{7}	Essendon Baptist St John's^{1}	Competition not yet formed	Competition not yet formed	Competition not yet formed	Competition not yet formed
1955	Moonee Imperials^{4}	Lincoln Stars	Competition not yet formed	Competition not yet formed	Competition not yet formed	Competition not yet formed
1954	Essendon Doutta Stars	Brunswick^{7}	Competition not yet formed	Competition not yet formed	Competition not yet formed	Competition not yet formed
1953	Essendon Doutta Stars	Aberfeldie	Competition not yet formed	Competition not yet formed	Competition not yet formed	Competition not yet formed
1952	Moonee Valley	St Davids	Competition not yet formed	Competition not yet formed	Competition not yet formed	Competition not yet formed
1951	Essendon Doutta Stars	Glenroy	Competition not yet formed	Competition not yet formed	Competition not yet formed	Competition not yet formed
1950	Essendon Doutta Stars	Lincoln Tigers	Competition not yet formed	Competition not yet formed	Competition not yet formed	Competition not yet formed
1949	Essendon Doutta Stars	Glenroy	Competition not yet formed	Competition not yet formed	Competition not yet formed	Competition not yet formed
1948	Essendon Doutta Stars	Competition not yet formed	Competition not yet formed	Competition not yet formed	Competition not yet formed	Competition not yet formed
1947	Ascot Vale United^{1}	Competition not yet formed	Competition not yet formed	Competition not yet formed	Competition not yet formed	Competition not yet formed
1946	Ascot Vale United^{1}	Competition not yet formed	Competition not yet formed	Competition not yet formed	Competition not yet formed	Competition not yet formed
1945	EDFL in recess (WWII)	Competition not yet formed	Competition not yet formed	Competition not yet formed	Competition not yet formed	Competition not yet formed
1944	EDFL in recess (WWII)	Competition not yet formed	Competition not yet formed	Competition not yet formed	Competition not yet formed	Competition not yet formed
1943	EDFL in recess (WWII)	Competition not yet formed	Competition not yet formed	Competition not yet formed	Competition not yet formed	Competition not yet formed
1942	EDFL in recess (WWII)	Competition not yet formed	Competition not yet formed	Competition not yet formed	Competition not yet formed	Competition not yet formed
1941	La Mascotte^{3}	Competition not yet formed	Competition not yet formed	Competition not yet formed	Competition not yet formed	Competition not yet formed
1940	Ascot Vale^{1}	Competition not yet formed	Competition not yet formed	Competition not yet formed	Competition not yet formed	Competition not yet formed
1939	La Mascotte^{3}	Competition not yet formed	Competition not yet formed	Competition not yet formed	Competition not yet formed	Competition not yet formed
1938	Ascot Vale^{1}	Competition not yet formed	Competition not yet formed	Competition not yet formed	Competition not yet formed	Competition not yet formed
1937	Ascot Vale^{1}	Competition not yet formed	Competition not yet formed	Competition not yet formed	Competition not yet formed	Competition not yet formed
1936	Ascot Vale^{1}	Competition not yet formed	Competition not yet formed	Competition not yet formed	Competition not yet formed	Competition not yet formed
1935	Ascot Vale^{1}	Competition not yet formed	Competition not yet formed	Competition not yet formed	Competition not yet formed	Competition not yet formed
1934	Woodland^{2}	Competition not yet formed	Competition not yet formed	Competition not yet formed	Competition not yet formed	Competition not yet formed
1933	Ascot Vale^{1}	Competition not yet formed	Competition not yet formed	Competition not yet formed	Competition not yet formed	Competition not yet formed
1932	Woodland^{2}	Competition not yet formed	Competition not yet formed	Competition not yet formed	Competition not yet formed	Competition not yet formed
1931	Woodland^{2}	Competition not yet formed	Competition not yet formed	Competition not yet formed	Competition not yet formed	Competition not yet formed
1930	Essendon Baptist St John's^{1}	Competition not yet formed	Competition not yet formed	Competition not yet formed	Competition not yet formed	Competition not yet formed

Notes
^{1} Merger occurred between Essedon Baptist St Johns and Ascot Vale Presbyterians in 1973 to form Tullamarine Ascot Presbyterians, then later Essendon Tullamarine and finally shortened to Tullamarine Football Club in 1981.
^{2} Woodland Football Club folded at the end of the 1934 Season.
^{3} La Mascotte played until the EDFL suspended competition due to WW2 in 1942 and didn't reform when the EDFL resumed in 1946.
^{4} Moonee Imperials merged with Riverside Stars at conclusion of 1979 season to form Maribyrnong Park.
^{5} Later renamed to Coburg Districts Football Club in 1981 to greater recognise the local community.
^{6} Old Essendon Gramarians joined the EDFL in 1968 for just two seasons until joining the VAFA (Victorian Amateur Football Association) for the 1970 and 1971 seasons before returning to the EDFL between 1972 and 1983, then departing to play in the Footscray District Football League, now the Western Region Football League in 1983.
^{7} Renamed from Brunswick to Brunswick City in 1955, Folded at the end of the 1986 season
^{8} Left the EDFL to join the Footscray District Football League, now the Western Region Football League at the conclusion of the 1987 season, folded in 1997. Later reformed in 2017, only participating in under-age football.
^{9} 2023 premier division premiership stripped from Keilor for salary cap breaches.

== History ==
The EDFL was first formed in 1930 at the instigation of the Essendon Football Club to increase the pool of local talent available for recruitment. Consequently, the league has consistently had positive ties with Essendon Football Club which can also be seen with the use of former Essendon home ground Essendon Football Ground, now known as Windy Hill as the headquarters of the EDFL since 1958 and hosting training for umpires of the league and occasional use of the ground for home and away season matches as well as being a commonly featuring ground for men's grand finals.

The first season in 1930 consisted of eight clubs, Ascot Vale, Flemington and Kensington, St John's, Kensington Methodist, Essendon High School Old Boys, Northern Juniors, West Essendon and Woodlands. None of the original foundation clubs exist in their current state as a result of participating in mergers or folding since. The completion of the season saw Les Rennie recruited by Essendon, the first successful recruitment of a player from the EDFL, he went on to play for Essendon throughout the 1931 VFL season. Later, in 1933 the great Dick Reynolds, one of just four players to have won three Brownlow Medals was recruited from Woodlands in the EDFL and began his successful 320 game career with Essendon.

In 1936, the first juniors competition was launched which contained a solitary under 16s division, once more at the instigation of the Essendon Football Club however this was abandoned and resumed at a later date in 1948 with the introduction of under-17s. By 1949, 32 teams took part in 3 grades of junior age football. 1962 saw the induction of under-15s to the EDFL and the competition was won by Essendon Doutta Stars, however as a result of fielding an overage player forfeited all their points for the season. In 1967, the inaugural A grade under-13s competition was launched which was a resounding success and resulted in demand for a B grade competition after just one year in 1968.

As a result of World War II the competition went into recess in 1941 with many players fighting in the war, once the war had ended two clubs (La Mascotte and Fawkner District) chose not to resume participation in the competition, despite this, After four years of recess a successful resumption of the leagues activities in this year. A 10 team competition on resumption resumed the success of the pre War Competition.

1949 saw the first split of the teams into two divisions (A grade and B grade) with Essendon Doutta Stars taking out the first ever undefeated season and Glenroy winning the inaugural B grade competition. Later in 1961, C grade was introduced to help facilitate the introduction of more clubs into the EDFL and was won by Doutta Stars, believed to be a reserve team for Essendon Doutta Stars. However, this competition did not last for long before going into recess after the 1982 season and only returning after the 30-year hiatus in 2012.

In 1961, The Umpires Association (EDFLUA) was inaugurated to help with the recruitment of umpires to officiate games. Despite this the league was consistently short of umpires. Notably in 1990, the season commenced with a desperate shortage of umpires. The problem was solved in the short term by former umpires who came out of retirement to assist the league.

in 1989, then prime minister of Australia Bob Hawke attended the A-grade seniors grand final.

== EDFL Women's ==
=== History ===
EDFL Women's
- Upcoming season or competition: 2023
- Sport: Women's Australian rules football
- Founded: 2016; 10 years ago
- First season: 2018
- No. of teams: 22
- Most titles: Aberfeldie, Keilor, Pascoe Vale (1)

In partnership with the Western Region Football League (WRFL), in 2016 the two leagues established the Western Region & Essendon District Women's Football League, an eleven-team open-age competition for women. Five EDFL clubs fielded teams in the competition – Craigieburn, Glenroy, Keilor, Pascoe Vale and Roxburgh Park – with Keilor prevailing against WRFL side Manor Lakes in the grand final.

In 2018, the EDFL established its own Women's competition, consisting of 13 teams. Of those 13 teams, two came from outside of the League – the Ballarat Football League-side Sunbury Lions; and Sunbury Kangaroos, at the time competing in the Riddell District Football League. Glenroy, despite competing in the 2017 joint competition, did not field a side, while Avondale Heights and Taylors Lakes fielded a joint team under the Avondale Heights–Taylors Lakes moniker.

In 2019, the competition expanded to 19 teams and was split into two divisions – a 10-club Premier Division and a nine-club Division 1. Aberfeldie became the first team to field two sides, one in each division.

=== Clubs ===
Club	Colours	Moniker	Home venue	Former league	Est.	Years in EDFL	EDFL senior premierships	
Club	Colours	Moniker	Home venue	Former league	Est.	Years in EDFL	Total	Most recent
Premier Division
Aberfeldie		Abers	Clifton Park, Aberfeldie	—	2018	2018–	1	2019
Caroline Springs		Lakers	Society 1056 Oval, Caroline Springs	WFNL	2002	2026–	0	-
Essendon Doutta Stars		Stars	Nipper Jordan Oval, Essendon	—	2019	2019–	2	2023
Greenvale		Jets	Greenvale Reserve, Greenvale	—	2019	2019–	1	2024
Hillside		Sharks	Hillside Reserve, Hillside	—	2018	2018–	1	2025
Keilor		Blues	Keilor Recreation Reserve, Keilor	WREDWFL	2017	2018–	1	2022
Moonee Valley		Valley	Ormond Park, Moonee Ponds	—	2021	2021–	0	—
Maribyrnong Park		Lions	Maribyrnong Park, Moonee Ponds	—	2019	2019–	0	—
Oak Park		Kangaroos	Oak Park Reserve, Oak Park	2022	—	2022–	1	2023
Division 1
Burnside Heights		Bears	Burnside Heights Recreation Reserve, Burnside Heights	—	2018	2018–	0	—
Coburg Districts		Lions	Cole Reserve, Pascoe Vale	—	2019	2019–	1	2023
Keilor Park		Devils	Keilor Park Recreational Reserve, Keilor Park	—	2018	2018–2019,	0	—
Strathmore		Mores	Boeing Reserve, Strathmore Heights	—	2018	2018–	2	2025
Tullamarine		Demons	Leo Dineen Reserve, Tullamarine	—	2019	2019–	1	2022
Westmeadows		Tigers	Willowbrook Reserve, Westmeadows	—	2018	2018–	0	—
Division 2
East Sunbury		Thunder	John McMahon Reserve, Sunbury	—	2024	2024–	0	—
Gisborne-Kyneton United		Bulldogs	Gardiner Reserve, Gisborne	AFL Goldfields	2017	2021–2023, 2025–	1	2025
Roxburgh Park		Magpies	Lakeside Reserve, Roxburgh Park	WREDWFL	2017	2018–2019, 2024–	0	—
Sunbury Lions		Lions	Clarke Oval, Sunbury	WREDWFL	2017	2018–	0	—
Sunbury Kangaroos		Kangaroos	Eric Boardman Reserve, Sunbury	—	2022	2018	0	—
Taylors Lakes		Lions	Lionheart Reserve, Taylors Lakes	—	2024	2024–	0	—
Reserves
Aberfeldie		Abers	Clifton Park, Aberfeldie	—	2018	2018–	1	2019
Caroline Springs		Lakers	Town Centre Oval, Caroline Springs	—	2002	2025–	0	—
Essendon Doutta Stars		Stars	Nipper Jordan Oval, Essendon	—	2019	2019–	2	2023
Hillside		Sharks	Hillside Reserve, Hillside	—	2018	2018–	0	—
Yarraville Seddon		Eagles	Yarraville Oval, Yarraville	—	2006	2025–	0	—
denotes that the club's most recent senior premiership was in Division 1. Notes: ^{1} Avondale Heights competed as Avondale Heights-Taylors Lakes in 2018.

=== Premierships ===
	Seniors			Reserves
Year	Premier Division	Division 1	Division 2	Reserves
2026	Strathmore	Westmedows	No comp.	Hillside
2025	Hillside	Strathmore	Gisborne-Kyneton United	Aberfeldie
2024	Oak Park	Greenvale	Coburg Districts	Aberfeldie
2023	Oak Park	Essendon Doutta Stars	Airport West	Comp. not yet formed
2022	Keilor	Strathmore	Tullamarine	Comp. not yet formed
2021	Keilor	Moonee Valley	Moonee Valley	Comp. not yet formed
2020	Competition not held due to COVID-19 pandemic			Comp. not yet formed
2019	Aberfeldie	Essendon Doutta Stars	Comp. not yet formed	Comp. not yet formed
2018	Pascoe Vale	Comp. not yet formed	Comp. not yet formed	Comp. not yet formed
2017	Keilor	Comp. not yet formed	Comp. not yet formed	Comp. not yet formed

== Juniors matches ==
The juniors consist of: Under 8s, Under 10s, Under 14s, Under 16s and Under 18.5s. There are also youth girls teams in the junior divisions. There are eight junior divisions at this level and each team listed in the senior section has at least one junior team in divisions 1, 2 or 3 for each age group, however many clubs have more in divisions 4, 5, 6, 7 and 8.

=== Junior-only clubs ===
Club	Colours	Moniker	Home venue	Est.	Former league	Years in EDFL						
Club	Colours	Moniker	Home venue	Est.	Former league	Years in EDFL	Ascot Vale	Panthers	Walter Street Reserve, Ascot Vale	2017	–	2017–
Coburg		Lions	Jackson Reserve, Coburg North	1891	–	2022–						
Dallas			Jacana Reserve, Jacana	2024	–	2024–						
St Francis		Saints	Oak Park Reserve, Oak Park	2015	–	2017–						
