= 1962 VFL grand final =

Grand final of the 1962 Victorian Football League season

1962 VFL Grand Final

Essendon	Carlton
13.12 (90)	8.10 (58)
	1	2	3	4
ESS	6.5 (41)	7.7 (49)	10.10 (70)	13.12 (90)
CAR	1.1 (7)	5.6 (36)	7.8 (50)	8.10 (58)
- Date: 29 September 1962
- Stadium: Melbourne Cricket Ground
- Attendance: 98,385

The 1962 VFL Grand Final was an Australian rules football game contested between the Essendon Football Club and Carlton Football Club, held at the Melbourne Cricket Ground in Melbourne on 29 September 1962. It was the 65th annual Grand Final of the Victorian Football League, staged to determine the premiers for the 1962 VFL season. The match, attended by 98,385 spectators, was won by Essendon by a margin of 32 points, marking that club's 11th premiership victory.

== Teams ==
Essendon	Carlton

Essendon
B:	5 David Shaw	36 Paul Doran	24 Don McKenzie
HB:	28 Alec Epis	10 Ian Shelton	32 Barry Davis
C:	14 Russell Blew	18 Graeme Beissel	12 Barry Capuano
HF:	16 Graeme Johnston	23 Ken Fraser	19 John Somerville
F:	25 Ken Timms	7 Charlie Payne	11 John Birt
Foll:	30 Geoff Leek	31 Hugh Mitchell	1 Jack Clarke (c)
Res:	34 Brian Sampson	6 Geoff Gosper	
Coach:	John Coleman		

Carlton
B:	8 John Benetti	18 Peter Barry	16 Maurie Sankey
HB:	26 Graeme Anderson	20 Wes Lofts	14 Bob Crowe
C:	19 Ian Collins	9 Berkley Cox	30 Murray Kick
HF:	13 Graham Donaldson (c)	10 John James	12 John Gill
F:	5 Ken Greenwood	22 Tom Carroll	36 Peter Falconer
Foll:	2 John Nicholls	1 Sergio Silvagni	31 Bruce Williams
Res:	32 Vasil Varlamos	23 Martin Cross	
Coach:	Ken Hands		

Umpire – Jack Irving

== Scoreboard ==
Team	1	2	3	Final
Essendon	6.5 (41)	7.7 (49)	10.10 (70)	13.12 (90)
Carlton	1.1 (7)	5.6 (36)	7.8 (50)	8.10 (58)

== Statistics ==
=== Goalkickers ===
Essendon:

- Birt 4
- Clarke 2
- Mitchell 2
- Payne 2
- Johnston 1
- Leek 1
- Timms 1

Carlton:

- Williams 3
- Nicholls 2
- Cross 1
- Donaldson 1
- Greenwood 1

=== Attendance ===
- MCG crowd – 98,385

== See also ==
- 1962 VFL season
