= Brian Kekovich =

Australian rules footballer (1946–2025)

Personal information
- Born: 7 January 1946
- Died: 28 October 2025 (aged 79)
- Original team: Mytleford Football Club
- Debut: Round 1, 1967, Carlton vs. Fitzroy, at Princes Park
- Height: 187 cm (6 ft 2 in)
- Weight: 86 kg (190 lb)

Playing career
Years	Club	Games (Goals)
1967–1968	Carlton	34 (97)

Career highlights
- 2× Carlton leading goalkicker 1967, 1968; Carlton premiership player 1968

Brian Kekovich (7 January 1946 – 28 October 2025) was an Australian rules footballer in the Victorian Football League (now the Australian Football League), who played for two seasons with the Carlton Football Club.

His VFL career was brought to a sudden end when he was forced to retire after suffering a severe back injury.

== Kekovich brothers ==
Kekovich was the older brother of former North Melbourne and Collingwood player Sam Kekovich. His youngest brother, Michael, recruited from Trinity Grammar, showed great promise at North Melbourne at the age of 16, played for the North Melbourne First XVIII on 10 September 1970 against Footscray in the first round of the 1970 VFL night premiership. North Melbourne lost 6.7 (43) to 14.13 (97). Michael also played in the North Melbourne Second XVIII team that lost the 1970 preliminary final to Melbourne, and he kicked one goal in a losing team.

Michael was killed, aged 17, when he was hit by a car whilst on a training run in High Street, Doncaster (near Curnola Avenue), on the evening of 26 June 1971.

== Carlton ==
Recruited from Myrtleford Football Club in the Ovens & Murray Football League, where he kicked 49 goals in 1966. Kekovich was originally signed with Richmond. He was signed up to play with Carlton immediately Richmond's hold on him had lapsed. In his first Carlton pre-season practice match for 1967 he played at full-forward against Wes Lofts. The Melbourne newspapers were calling him "Carlton's second top recruit" for 1967 (i.e., second to Alex Jesaulenko).

A very strong and reliable mark, and a long and accurate left-foot kick, Kekovich made his debut (as did Alex Jesaulenko) for Carlton in Round 1, 1967.

=== Battle for clearance ===
When Carlton applied for a clearance for Kekovich in March 1967, Myrtleford refused to clear him, but granted him six match permits. Despite his second request for a clearance, Myrtleford demanded that he return to Myrtleford immediately he had played the six matches. Kekovich threatened to remain in Melbourne, and stay out of football altogether if Myrtleford did not clear him. He was cleared at the last moment by Myrtleford, just in time for him to play in round seven (and, therefore, not miss a match).

=== Career ===
Kekovich played 34 senior games for Carlton (17 games in 1967, and 17 in 1968).

In one of the club's 1968 pre-season practice matches, Kekovich, playing at full-forward, had been held to only two goals by Ron Stone up to three-quarter time; in the last quarter Kekovich dominated and scored another five goals to make his total seven goals for the match.

In 1968, Carlton won every match in which Kekovich took the field, and lost each of the five matches he missed: round 2 (full-forward Peter Smith, 3 goals), round 3 (full-forward Peter Smith, 1 goal), round 14 (full-forward Peter Smith, 0 goals), round 15 (full-forward Alex Jesaulenko, 3 goals), and round 16 (full-forward Bill Bennett, 2 goals).

He kicked a total of 95 career goals; he kicked 6 goals in a match twice, 5 goals four times, and 4 goals six times. He was Carlton's leading goal-kicker in 1967 and 1968, kicking 36 goals and 59 goals respectively.

=== Last senior match ===
Kekovich received four Brownlow Medal votes during the 1968 season; and he was a very significant contributor to Carlton's three-point 1968 Grand Final victory over Essendon: 7.14 (56) to 8.5 (53).

He played at full forward. In extremely blustery conditions, and in a torrid match, he scored four of his team's seven goals. At one point, as he was going for a mark, he was "lined up" at the same moment by two of Essendon's toughest defenders, Alex Epis (who was playing his last VFL game, and had been instructed by the Essendon coach Jack Clarke to "belt" Kekovich) and Neil Evans. Neither Epis nor Evans knew that his teammate was running at Kekovich and, as Kekovich noticed both approaching, he used all of his evasive skills to get out of their road. Evans smashed into Epis and knocked him out; and Kekovich remained unscathed.

Kekovich's four goals were scored before half-time, and it seemed that he was carrying an injury for the second half of the match. He was one of Carlton's best players, and he had made a very strong contribution to their win.

Des Tuddenham, reporting for The Age, wrote: "I saw one of Brian Kekovich's kicks for goal, aimed at the left hand post, swing over to the other behind post and then come back and go through for a goal, so the wind was certainly unpredictable."

=== Back injury ===
Unable to play in Carlton's match in Adelaide, on the Saturday following the VFL Grand Final, against the 1968 SAFL Premiers, Sturt Football Club, he sought treatment for a severe back injury, and was advised to retire from the game immediately, or risk becoming permanently paralysed.

He had kept the severity and nature of his back ailment to himself, and the Carlton officials were not aware that the courageous and highly motivated Kekovich was secretly receiving extensive treatment, including acupuncture, each week, at his own expense.

In 1969, he finally revealed that he had been badly injured when he had been kicked on the top of his right hip during a match against Fitzroy in 1968.

=== Carlton reserves ===
Still hoping that he could return to playing senior football with Carlton, he rested, received treatment and began training as soon as he was able to do so.

He played his first game for the 1969 season with the Carlton reserves team against Essendon on 31 May 1969 (round 9). He "showed outstanding form" and kicked four goals in the match and "he reported no ill-effects from the back injury ... which he had suffered towards the end of last season". Carlton were hoping that he would soon be restored to the senior team, because, in his absence, "the Carlton selectors [were] known to be unwilling to waste the brilliance of Alex Jesaulenko at full-forward".

He played on 16 June (round 10) against North Melbourne, once again he scored four goals. He played against Fitzroy on 21 June (round 11), scoring one goal.

On 26 June 1969, Kekovich applied for a clearance from Carlton to North Melbourne, on the grounds that he wanted to play with his brother Sam. He "trained lightly" on that Thursday evening, and "did not speak to the match committee about a clearance".

Carlton refused his request on the basis that, if he was indeed fit to play senior VFL football, Carlton needed him in their team. The match committee that had considered his request, had also sought the advice of the club doctor about the nature of his back injury. The club doctor "told them that at no time this season had Kekovich been fully fit". On these grounds, the Carlton selectors did not consider him for the weekend's reserves grade match and said that "[Kekovich] would no be considered until the doctor had given him a fitness clearance". Carlton then waited to be fully informed in relation to the true extent of Kekovich's injury, his fitness levels and their estimation of the likelihood of such an outstanding, talented footballer ever being able to return to top level VFL football once again and, hopefully, play a dominant part in Carlton's ongoing future.

He did not play again for Carlton's reserve grade team in 1969.

== North Melbourne ==
In 1970, the courageous Kekovich (still only 24) sought, and was granted a clearance from Carlton to North Melbourne.

In February 1970, the Carlton secretary, Bert Deacon, apparently now in possession of the medical report from the Carlton doctor, announced that Kekovich, who had been training quite intensely in the preceding few months had been cleared, on "compassionate grounds", to North Melbourne, so that he could be with his two brothers.

Once he had transferred to North Melbourne he seemed to be training well and to be in good shape. In a March pre-season training match against Wangaratta Rovers, playing at full-forward, "Kekovich led well and kicked accurately, finishing with eight goals".

However, by the time that the 1970 home-and-away season started, his back injuries were limiting his capacity to train; and, having bravely played four Second XVIII games for North Melbourne, he was dropped from the North Melbourne training list in May 1970.

== Death ==
Kekovich died on 28 October 2025 at the age of 79.
