= 1968 VFL grand final =

Grand final of the 1968 Victorian Football League season

1968 VFL Grand Final

Carlton	Essendon
7.14 (56)	8.5 (53)
	1	2	3	4
CAR	2.2 (14)	6.8 (44)	7.9 (51)	7.14 (56)
ESS	2.1 (13)	5.1 (31)	6.4 (40)	8.5 (53)
- Date: 28 September 1968
- Stadium: Melbourne Cricket Ground
- Attendance: 116,828

The 1968 VFL Grand Final was an Australian rules football game contested between the Carlton Football Club and Essendon Football Club, held at the Melbourne Cricket Ground on Saturday, 28 September 1968. It was the 71st annual Grand Final of the Victorian Football League, staged to determine the premiers for the 1968 VFL season. The match, attended by a record crowd of 116,828 spectators, was won by Carlton by a margin of 3 points, making it that club's ninth premiership victory, but its first since winning the 1947 VFL Grand Final.

The Blues emerged victorious despite Essendon kicking more goals, the first and only time that had happened in a VFL/AFL grand final until Collingwood defeated Brisbane in the 2023 AFL Grand Final. There was a strong wind blowing during the whole game, which did not help it as a spectacle and possibly contributed to Carlton's inaccuracy. Garry Crane starred on the wing for the Blues with 30 possessions.

Essendon came within a point of Carlton at the 20 minute mark of the final term after a goal to Geoff Blethyn. Despite being goal-less in the final quarter, Carlton managed to keep their lead, thanks largely to 20th man Neil Chandler, who took some crucial marks in the dying stages.

Aided by the opening during the year of the ground's new Western Stand, the attendance of 116,828 was the highest at a VFL premiership decider up to that time, breaking the record of 115,902 spectators who witnessed the 1956 VFL Grand Final. The new record was broken at the 1969 VFL Grand Final, and that record was broken in turn at the 1970 VFL Grand Final.

== Teams ==
Carlton	Essendon

Carlton
B:	19 Ian Collins	20 Wes Lofts	42 Robert Walls
HB:	21 Barry Gill	11 John Goold	3 Kevin Hall
C:	34 Ian Robertson	17 Brent Crosswell	6 Garry Crane
HF:	25 Alex Jesaulenko	12 Bill Bennett	32 Bryan Quirk
F:	28 Peter Jones	16 Brian Kekovich	8 Dennis Munari
Foll:	2 John Nicholls (c)	1 Sergio Silvagni	10 Adrian Gallagher
Res:	36 Peter McLean	47 Neil Chandler	
Coach:	Ron Barassi		

Essendon
B:	17 Darryl Gerlach	35 Geoff Pryor	36 Neil Evans
HB:	28 Alec Epis	22 John Williams	32 Barry Davis
C:	21 Ken Fletcher	30 John Ellis	14 Russell Blew
HF:	19 Robin Close	10 Alan Noonan	5 David Shaw
F:	20 Ted Fordham	11 Geoff Blethyn	26 Paul Sproule
Foll:	24 Don McKenzie (c)	7 Charlie Payne	6 Geoff Gosper
Res:	16 Bruce Lake	15 Don Gross	
Coach:	Jack Clarke		

== Scorecard ==
Carlton vs Essendon
2:30PM AEST
Team	Q1	Q2	Q3	Final
Carlton	2.2 (14)	6.8 (44)	7.9 (51)	7.14 (56)
Essendon	2.1 (13)	5.1 (31)	6.4 (40)	8.5 (53)
Venue:		Melbourne Cricket Ground, Melbourne		
Date and time:		28 September 1968		
Attendance:		116,828		
Umpires:		Jeff Crouch (central)		
Goal scorers:	Carlton	4: Kekovich; 1: Crane, Crosswell, Quirk		
Goal scorers:	Essendon	4: Blethyn; 1: Close, Lake, Noonan, Sproule		
Best:	Carlton			
Best:	Essendon			
Reports:		nil		
Injuries:		nil		
