= 1958 Brownlow Medal =

- Winner: Neil Roberts (St Kilda); 24 votes

Television/radio coverage
- Network: Seven Network

The 1958 Brownlow Medal was the 31st year the award was presented to the player adjudged the fairest and best player during the Victorian Football League (VFL) home and away season. Neil Roberts of the St Kilda Football Club won the medal by polling twenty-four votes during the 1958 VFL season.

== Leading votegetters ==
	Player	Votes
1st	Neil Roberts (St Kilda)	24
2nd	Brendan Edwards (Hawthorn)	22
3rd	Bob Skilton (South Melbourne)	19
4th	Allen Aylett (North Melbourne)	17
5th	Bill Gunn (South Melbourne)	16
=6th	John Birt (Essendon)	15
=6th	Jack Clarke (Essendon)	15
=6th	Jeff Gamble (Essendon)	15
=9th	Harry Sullivan (Collingwood)	14
=9th	Ted Whitten (Footscray)	14
