= Neil Evans =

Neil Evans may refer to:

- Neil Evans (footballer), former Australian rules footballer
- Neil Evans (presenter), former Fox Sports television presenter

== See also ==
- Neal Evans, entrepreneur
