= 1970 VFL season =

74th season of the Victorian Football League (VFL)

1970 VFL premiership season
- Teams: 12
- Premiers: Carlton; 10th premiership
- Minor premiers: Collingwood; 15th minor premiership
- Consolation series: Footscray; 4th Consolation series win
- Brownlow Medallist: Peter Bedford (South Melbourne)
- Coleman Medallist: Peter Hudson (Hawthorn)

Attendance
- Matches played: 136
- Total attendance: 3,321,925 (24,426 per match)
- Highest: 121,696

The 1970 VFL season was the 74th season of the Victorian Football League (VFL), the highest level senior Australian rules football competition in Victoria.

The season featured twelve clubs, and ran from 4 April until 26 September. It was the first season to play comprise a 22-game home-and-away season, which became the standard for the following fifty years, and which was followed by a finals series featuring the top four clubs. The season saw the opening of the league's privately owned stadium, VFL Park, in Mulgrave.

The premiership was won by the Carlton Football Club for the tenth time, after it defeated Collingwood by ten points in the 1970 VFL Grand Final. A crowd of 121,696 attended the match, the all-time record for the highest Australian rules football crowd.

== Background ==
In 1970, the VFL competition consisted of twelve teams of 18 on-the-field players each, plus two substitute players, known as the 19th man and the 20th man. A player could be substituted for any reason; however, once substituted, a player could not return to the field of play under any circumstances.

Teams played each other in a home-and-away season of 22 rounds; matches 12 to 22 were the "home-and-way reverse" of matches 1 to 11.

Once the 22 round home-and-away season had finished, the 1970 VFL Premiers were determined by the specific format and conventions of the Page–McIntyre system.

== Home-and-away season ==
=== Round 1 ===
Home team	Home team score	Away team	Away team score	Venue	Crowd	Date
Carlton	21.19 (145)	Essendon	14.12 (96)	Princes Park	23,948	4 April 1970
St Kilda	14.16 (100)	North Melbourne	7.6 (48)	Moorabbin Oval	21,429	4 April 1970
South Melbourne	9.14 (68)	Melbourne	14.9 (93)	Lake Oval	15,242	4 April 1970
Hawthorn	19.12 (126)	Geelong	21.9 (135)	Glenferrie Oval	20,509	4 April 1970
Footscray	12.12 (84)	Collingwood	23.10 (148)	Western Oval	26,596	4 April 1970
Richmond	14.12 (96)	Fitzroy	16.20 (116)	MCG	38,617	5 April 1970

=== Round 2 ===
Home team	Home team score	Away team	Away team score	Venue	Crowd	Date
North Melbourne	8.11 (59)	South Melbourne	8.12 (60)	Arden Street Oval	10,986	11 April 1970
Fitzroy	7.9 (51)	St Kilda	23.23 (161)	Junction Oval	22,857	11 April 1970
Essendon	10.14 (74)	Footscray	14.22 (106)	Windy Hill	19,380	11 April 1970
Collingwood	19.19 (133)	Richmond	13.16 (94)	Victoria Park	35,318	11 April 1970
Melbourne	14.12 (96)	Hawthorn	11.19 (85)	MCG	25,575	11 April 1970
Geelong	12.9 (81)	Carlton	16.7 (103)	Kardinia Park	28,302	11 April 1970

=== Round 3 ===
Home team	Home team score	Away team	Away team score	Venue	Crowd	Date
Footscray	14.23 (107)	St Kilda	10.14 (74)	Western Oval	17,972	18 April 1970
Collingwood	14.24 (108)	Hawthorn	15.11 (101)	Victoria Park	24,532	18 April 1970
North Melbourne	18.13 (121)	Melbourne	8.16 (64)	Arden Street Oval	10,182	18 April 1970
South Melbourne	12.17 (89)	Essendon	15.10 (100)	Lake Oval	14,726	18 April 1970
Richmond	17.12 (114)	Carlton	15.11 (101)	MCG	46,373	18 April 1970
Fitzroy	7.11 (53)	Geelong	17.12 (114)	VFL Park	27,557	18 April 1970

=== Round 4 ===
Home team	Home team score	Away team	Away team score	Venue	Crowd	Date
Carlton	16.16 (112)	North Melbourne	13.15 (93)	Princes Park	20,540	25 April 1970
St Kilda	15.19 (109)	Richmond	7.12 (54)	Moorabbin Oval	32,147	25 April 1970
Melbourne	17.19 (121)	Fitzroy	13.13 (91)	MCG	22,909	25 April 1970
Hawthorn	10.10 (70)	Essendon	16.14 (110)	Glenferrie Oval	19,017	25 April 1970
Geelong	14.9 (93)	Collingwood	14.17 (101)	Kardinia Park	35,654	25 April 1970
South Melbourne	11.11 (77)	Footscray	9.6 (60)	VFL Park	24,371	25 April 1970

=== Round 5 ===
Home team	Home team score	Away team	Away team score	Venue	Crowd	Date
Richmond	6.13 (49)	South Melbourne	10.11 (71)	MCG	23,084	2 May 1970
Footscray	11.13 (79)	Hawthorn	11.10 (76)	Western Oval	19,610	2 May 1970
Fitzroy	5.24 (54)	North Melbourne	7.7 (49)	Junction Oval	7,450	2 May 1970
Essendon	9.14 (68)	Geelong	14.4 (88)	Windy Hill	16,077	2 May 1970
St Kilda	8.9 (57)	Carlton	12.14 (86)	Moorabbin Oval	22,800	2 May 1970
Collingwood	8.17 (65)	Melbourne	8.9 (57)	VFL Park	28,454	2 May 1970

=== Round 6 ===
Home team	Home team score	Away team	Away team score	Venue	Crowd	Date
Carlton	23.9 (147)	Fitzroy	15.20 (110)	Princes Park	20,022	9 May 1970
South Melbourne	9.25 (79)	St Kilda	9.8 (62)	Lake Oval	20,312	9 May 1970
Geelong	18.15 (123)	Footscray	11.11 (77)	Kardinia Park	21,139	9 May 1970
Melbourne	10.12 (72)	Essendon	7.15 (57)	MCG	34,219	9 May 1970
North Melbourne	10.6 (66)	Collingwood	17.30 (132)	Arden Street Oval	20,091	9 May 1970
Hawthorn	20.10 (130)	Richmond	21.11 (137)	VFL Park	26,133	9 May 1970

=== Round 7 ===
Home team	Home team score	Away team	Away team score	Venue	Crowd	Date
Footscray	9.14 (68)	Melbourne	7.4 (46)	Western Oval	16,346	16 May 1970
Collingwood	15.15 (105)	Fitzroy	9.18 (72)	Victoria Park	22,774	16 May 1970
St Kilda	10.21 (81)	Hawthorn	8.8 (56)	Moorabbin Oval	17,618	16 May 1970
Richmond	16.20 (116)	Geelong	15.2 (92)	MCG	43,435	16 May 1970
South Melbourne	23.12 (150)	Carlton	10.13 (73)	Lake Oval	28,395	16 May 1970
Essendon	8.12 (60)	North Melbourne	9.22 (76)	VFL Park	13,339	16 May 1970

=== Round 8 ===
Home team	Home team score	Away team	Away team score	Venue	Crowd	Date
Melbourne	15.10 (100)	Richmond	18.19 (127)	MCG	36,064	23 May 1970
Hawthorn	21.20 (146)	South Melbourne	12.12 (84)	Glenferrie Oval	17,063	23 May 1970
Geelong	14.5 (89)	St Kilda	12.9 (81)	Kardinia Park	20,942	23 May 1970
North Melbourne	9.13 (67)	Footscray	13.18 (96)	Arden Street Oval	13,475	23 May 1970
Fitzroy	9.14 (68)	Essendon	11.5 (71)	Junction Oval	12,264	23 May 1970
Carlton	12.13 (85)	Collingwood	16.12 (108)	VFL Park	55,332	23 May 1970

=== Round 9 ===
Home team	Home team score	Away team	Away team score	Venue	Crowd	Date
Carlton	10.14 (74)	Hawthorn	15.16 (106)	Princes Park	19,298	30 May 1970
Richmond	10.17 (77)	North Melbourne	15.7 (97)	MCG	22,284	30 May 1970
St Kilda	14.12 (96)	Melbourne	7.11 (53)	Moorabbin Oval	19,393	30 May 1970
South Melbourne	19.14 (128)	Geelong	10.18 (78)	Lake Oval	19,794	30 May 1970
Essendon	13.15 (93)	Collingwood	11.21 (87)	Windy Hill	24,936	30 May 1970
Footscray	11.13 (79)	Fitzroy	12.9 (81)	VFL Park	10,292	30 May 1970

=== Round 10 ===
Home team	Home team score	Away team	Away team score	Venue	Crowd	Date
Fitzroy	14.9 (93)	South Melbourne	12.19 (91)	Junction Oval	16,971	6 June 1970
Essendon	14.13 (97)	Richmond	15.14 (104)	Windy Hill	20,650	6 June 1970
Collingwood	14.23 (107)	St Kilda	15.10 (100)	Victoria Park	30,858	6 June 1970
Melbourne	10.14 (74)	Geelong	13.13 (91)	MCG	27,665	6 June 1970
Footscray	15.14 (104)	Carlton	14.10 (94)	Western Oval	22,262	6 June 1970
North Melbourne	9.8 (62)	Hawthorn	11.9 (75)	VFL Park	14,214	6 June 1970

=== Round 11 ===
Home team	Home team score	Away team	Away team score	Venue	Crowd	Date
Geelong	11.17 (83)	North Melbourne	9.10 (64)	Kardinia Park	19,133	15 June 1970
Carlton	22.15 (147)	Melbourne	9.8 (62)	Princes Park	18,760	15 June 1970
Richmond	22.15 (147)	Footscray	13.12 (90)	MCG	41,866	15 June 1970
Hawthorn	18.12 (120)	Fitzroy	12.8 (80)	Glenferrie Oval	14,489	15 June 1970
South Melbourne	16.15 (111)	Collingwood	16.14 (110)	Lake Oval	35,567	15 June 1970
St Kilda	8.21 (69)	Essendon	8.9 (57)	VFL Park	21,105	15 June 1970

=== Round 12 ===
Home team	Home team score	Away team	Away team score	Venue	Crowd	Date
North Melbourne	5.10 (40)	St Kilda	11.5 (71)	Arden Street Oval	10,007	20 June 1970
Geelong	14.15 (99)	Hawthorn	10.11 (71)	Kardinia Park	12,698	20 June 1970
Fitzroy	12.11 (83)	Richmond	8.9 (57)	Junction Oval	14,541	20 June 1970
Collingwood	8.16 (64)	Footscray	7.9 (51)	Victoria Park	23,008	20 June 1970
Essendon	10.16 (76)	Carlton	12.9 (81)	Windy Hill	20,270	20 June 1970
Melbourne	12.6 (78)	South Melbourne	12.10 (82)	VFL Park	13,962	20 June 1970

=== Round 13 ===
Home team	Home team score	Away team	Away team score	Venue	Crowd	Date
Hawthorn	16.17 (113)	Melbourne	11.8 (74)	Glenferrie Oval	13,196	27 June 1970
Carlton	12.21 (93)	Geelong	11.14 (80)	Princes Park	25,519	27 June 1970
South Melbourne	16.9 (105)	North Melbourne	14.12 (96)	Lake Oval	12,407	27 June 1970
St Kilda	11.14 (80)	Fitzroy	8.11 (59)	Moorabbin Oval	17,073	27 June 1970
Footscray	11.12 (78)	Essendon	9.8 (62)	Western Oval	18,817	27 June 1970
Richmond	11.13 (79)	Collingwood	9.13 (67)	VFL Park	23,939	27 June 1970

=== Round 14 ===
Home team	Home team score	Away team	Away team score	Venue	Crowd	Date
Melbourne	11.19 (85)	North Melbourne	11.11 (77)	MCG	13,975	4 July 1970
Carlton	11.12 (78)	Richmond	7.7 (49)	Princes Park	26,895	4 July 1970
St Kilda	6.16 (52)	Footscray	6.10 (46)	Moorabbin Oval	15,415	4 July 1970
Geelong	20.8 (128)	Fitzroy	13.16 (94)	Kardinia Park	15,304	4 July 1970
Hawthorn	18.7 (115)	Collingwood	13.13 (91)	Glenferrie Oval	19,587	4 July 1970
Essendon	5.10 (40)	South Melbourne	11.5 (71)	VFL Park	13,238	4 July 1970

=== Round 15 ===
Home team	Home team score	Away team	Away team score	Venue	Crowd	Date
Richmond	11.15 (81)	St Kilda	7.21 (63)	MCG	38,037	11 July 1970
Footscray	6.4 (40)	South Melbourne	13.10 (88)	Western Oval	21,921	11 July 1970
Fitzroy	12.18 (90)	Melbourne	8.14 (62)	Junction Oval	9,467	11 July 1970
Essendon	9.8 (62)	Hawthorn	21.4 (130)	Windy Hill	13,174	11 July 1970
Collingwood	13.15 (93)	Geelong	8.16 (64)	Victoria Park	28,847	11 July 1970
North Melbourne	4.7 (31)	Carlton	13.21 (99)	VFL Park	12,572	11 July 1970

=== Round 16 ===
Home team	Home team score	Away team	Away team score	Venue	Crowd	Date
Carlton	16.14 (110)	St Kilda	10.11 (71)	Princes Park	22,988	18 July 1970
South Melbourne	11.9 (75)	Richmond	12.17 (89)	Lake Oval	25,651	18 July 1970
North Melbourne	13.17 (95)	Fitzroy	18.14 (122)	Arden Street Oval	8,443	18 July 1970
Geelong	15.16 (106)	Essendon	8.17 (65)	Kardinia Park	17,220	18 July 1970
Melbourne	7.19 (61)	Collingwood	10.16 (76)	MCG	36,044	18 July 1970
Hawthorn	23.9 (147)	Footscray	6.12 (48)	VFL Park	14,151	18 July 1970

=== Round 17 ===
Home team	Home team score	Away team	Away team score	Venue	Crowd	Date
St Kilda	13.14 (92)	South Melbourne	11.6 (72)	Moorabbin Oval	20,851	25 July 1970
Footscray	12.15 (87)	Geelong	7.14 (56)	Western Oval	14,660	25 July 1970
Essendon	18.17 (125)	Melbourne	12.17 (89)	Windy Hill	9,755	25 July 1970
Collingwood	14.21 (105)	North Melbourne	8.8 (56)	Victoria Park	15,678	25 July 1970
Richmond	15.15 (105)	Hawthorn	11.17 (83)	MCG	55,740	25 July 1970
Fitzroy	9.7 (61)	Carlton	10.11 (71)	VFL Park	13,828	25 July 1970

=== Round 18 ===
Home team	Home team score	Away team	Away team score	Venue	Crowd	Date
Hawthorn	11.11 (77)	St Kilda	14.18 (102)	Glenferrie Oval	16,698	1 August 1970
Carlton	11.17 (83)	South Melbourne	10.19 (79)	Princes Park	27,271	1 August 1970
Melbourne	8.13 (61)	Footscray	10.15 (75)	MCG	16,591	1 August 1970
North Melbourne	13.13 (91)	Essendon	16.22 (118)	Arden Street Oval	8,952	1 August 1970
Fitzroy	11.9 (75)	Collingwood	17.15 (117)	Junction Oval	18,760	1 August 1970
Geelong	13.10 (88)	Richmond	8.13 (61)	VFL Park	26,378	1 August 1970

=== Round 19 ===
Home team	Home team score	Away team	Away team score	Venue	Crowd	Date
Footscray	10.23 (83)	North Melbourne	11.15 (81)	Western Oval	13,118	8 August 1970
Essendon	12.16 (88)	Fitzroy	14.10 (94)	Windy Hill	13,572	8 August 1970
Richmond	9.10 (64)	Melbourne	18.10 (118)	MCG	25,158	8 August 1970
South Melbourne	16.7 (103)	Hawthorn	13.8 (86)	Lake Oval	17,437	8 August 1970
Collingwood	13.23 (101)	Carlton	2.12 (24)	Victoria Park	39,959	8 August 1970
St Kilda	12.16 (88)	Geelong	5.7 (37)	VFL Park	29,667	8 August 1970

=== Round 20 ===
Home team	Home team score	Away team	Away team score	Venue	Crowd	Date
North Melbourne	7.6 (48)	Richmond	16.10 (106)	Arden Street Oval	8,837	15 August 1970
Geelong	10.14 (74)	South Melbourne	11.15 (81)	Kardinia Park	29,918	15 August 1970
Fitzroy	12.10 (82)	Footscray	11.14 (80)	Junction Oval	11,398	15 August 1970
Collingwood	24.16 (160)	Essendon	11.13 (79)	Victoria Park	24,785	15 August 1970
Hawthorn	13.9 (87)	Carlton	18.9 (117)	Glenferrie Oval	20,841	15 August 1970
Melbourne	7.14 (56)	St Kilda	17.14 (116)	VFL Park	22,570	15 August 1970

=== Round 21 ===
Home team	Home team score	Away team	Away team score	Venue	Crowd	Date
Hawthorn	21.14 (140)	North Melbourne	9.20 (74)	Glenferrie Oval	8,061	22 August 1970
Geelong	16.12 (108)	Melbourne	13.18 (96)	Kardinia Park	13,670	22 August 1970
Carlton	18.14 (122)	Footscray	17.6 (108)	Princes Park	21,568	22 August 1970
South Melbourne	14.15 (99)	Fitzroy	10.20 (80)	Lake Oval	20,071	22 August 1970
Richmond	23.13 (151)	Essendon	11.11 (77)	MCG	25,862	22 August 1970
St Kilda	14.14 (98)	Collingwood	16.12 (108)	Moorabbin Oval	38,222	22 August 1970

=== Round 22 ===
Home team	Home team score	Away team	Away team score	Venue	Crowd	Date
Footscray	12.10 (82)	Richmond	10.12 (72)	Western Oval	16,672	29 August 1970
Fitzroy	9.11 (65)	Hawthorn	18.16 (124)	Junction Oval	11,626	29 August 1970
Essendon	8.11 (59)	St Kilda	14.19 (103)	Windy Hill	14,310	29 August 1970
Collingwood	22.15 (147)	South Melbourne	7.9 (51)	Victoria Park	41,451	29 August 1970
North Melbourne	12.11 (83)	Geelong	6.6 (42)	Arden Street Oval	6,435	29 August 1970
Melbourne	12.15 (87)	Carlton	14.17 (101)	MCG	40,973	29 August 1970

== Ladder ==
(P)	Premiers
	Qualified for finals

#	Team	P	W	L	D	PF	PA	%	Pts
1	Collingwood	22	18	4	0	2333	1709	136.5	72
2	Carlton (P)	22	16	6	0	2146	1911	112.3	64
3	St Kilda	22	14	8	0	1926	1532	125.7	56
4	South Melbourne	22	14	8	0	1914	1828	104.7	56
5	Geelong	22	12	10	0	1949	1903	102.4	48
6	Richmond	22	12	10	0	2029	1998	101.6	48
7	Footscray	22	11	11	0	1728	1894	91.2	44
8	Hawthorn	22	10	12	0	2264	1986	114.0	40
9	Fitzroy	22	9	13	0	1774	2155	82.3	36
10	Melbourne	22	6	16	0	1705	2043	83.5	24
11	Essendon	22	6	16	0	1734	2128	81.5	24
12	North Melbourne	22	4	18	0	1574	1989	79.1	16

Rules for classification: 1. premiership points; 2. percentage; 3. points for
Average score: 87.4
Source: AFL Tables

== Finals series ==
=== Semi-finals ===
Team	1 Qtr	2 Qtr	3 Qtr	Final
St Kilda	6.1 (37)	9.3 (57)	14.8 (92)	22.11 (143)
South Melbourne	2.5 (17)	9.8 (62)	10.10 (70)	13.12 (90)
Attendance: 110.467

Team	1 Qtr	2 Qtr	3 Qtr	Final
Collingwood	5.2 (32)	9.7 (61)	12.11 (83)	17.16 (118)
Carlton	5.0 (30)	9.2 (56)	14.3 (87)	17.6 (108)
Attendance: 109,345

=== Preliminary final ===
Team	1 Qtr	2 Qtr	3 Qtr	Final
Carlton	2.6 (18)	6.12 (48)	13.16 (94)	17.21 (123)
St Kilda	1.4 (10)	4.12 (36)	6.16 (52)	7.19 (61)
Attendance: 102,118

=== Grand final ===
Team	1 Qtr	2 Qtr	3 Qtr	Final
Carlton	0.3 (3)	4.5 (29)	12.5 (77)	17.9 (111)
Collingwood	4.8 (32)	10.13 (73)	13.16 (94)	14.17 (101)
Attendance: 121,696

== Consolation Night Series Competition ==
The consolation night series were held under the floodlights at Lake Oval, South Melbourne, for the teams (5th to 12th on ladder) out of the finals at the end of the home and away rounds.

Final: Footscray 13.17 (95) defeated Melbourne 13.15 (93).

== Season notes ==
- Unhappy with their treatment over the three seasons they spent at Princes Park, Fitzroy moved their home ground to the Junction Oval in St Kilda.
- VFL Park was opened. As part of accommodating the neutral ground, the 1970 VFL season was extended to 22 rounds, with each of the 12 clubs to play three games at VFL Park. The idea was that six clubs would play ten games on their home grounds, and the other six would play nine home ground matches. In 1971, the home ground advantage would be reversed, so that those teams that had nine home ground games in 1970 would play ten home ground games in 1971 and vice versa.
- On Monday 9 March, the Victoria representative team played a match under Gaelic football rules against the 1969 All-Ireland Senior football champions, Kerry, at the Melbourne Cricket Ground. Kerry 4-11 defeated Victoria 2–10.
- Essendon's Don McKenzie, Geoff Gosper, Darryl Gerlach, Geoff Pryor, and Barry Davis, and Collingwood's Len Thompson and Des Tuddenham did not play in Round 1 due to separate disputes over player payments with their respective clubs (see Dispute over player payments).
- The second half of the Round 1 match between Richmond and Fitzroy, played at the Melbourne Cricket Ground on Sunday, 5 April 1970, was attended by Queen Elizabeth II, Prince Philip, Duke of Edinburgh, the Prince of Wales (now Charles III) and Anne, Princess Royal, who were present as part of the 1970 royal tour commemorating the bicentenary of the first voyage of James Cook. The royals met the players on the field at half time and were present to unfurl Richmond's 1969 premiership flag before watching the second half. The match was specially scheduled to accommodate the royals' itinerary; it was the first VFL match played on a Sunday, and the second half was televised live in spite of the rules which normally precluded live telecasts of VFL matches.
- In Round 10, Collingwood trailed St Kilda by 60 points late in the second quarter, before coming back in the second half to win by seven points. It set a new record for the biggest comeback in VFL history which stood until 1999. The half-time deficit of the 52-point deficit remains, as of 2025, the greatest half-time deficit by a winning side.
- The 1970 season was the first in which three full-forwards (Alex Jesaulenko, Peter McKenna, and Peter Hudson) kicked at least 100 goals in a home-and-away season. (Note: Since equalled only in 1993 by Tony Modra, Gary Ablett Sr. and Jason Dunstall.) Hudson's 146 goals remains the highest tally on record for a home-and-away season, although only the third-highest overall total.
- South Melbourne ended the second-longest finals drought in league history (twenty-four seasons) by finishing fourth, making the finals for the first time since 1945. (Note: Hawthorn, after entering the league in 1925, did not make the finals until its thirty-third season in 1957)
- In Round 5, Ted Whitten played his 321st senior VFL game, breaking the record set by Dick Reynolds. Whitten retired after this match.
- On Monday 31 August HSV-7 broadcast the first live Brownlow Medal count.
- In the 1970 Second Semi-Final, Carlton's Syd Jackson was reported for striking Collingwood defender Lee Adamson. Carlton president George Harris, eager to have Jackson in his Grand Final team, devised the strategy of having the club's advocate to assert to the tribunal (on Jackson's behalf) that Jackson had been provoked by an extended series of racial taunts from Adamson, including repeatedly calling him "Sambo" and, furthermore, stating that Jackson would respond in the same way to any future vilification. The tribunal took the stance that the VFL had to be seen to protect its only top-level Aboriginal footballer at the time, and they immediately exonerated him, without hearing Adamson's side of the story, stating that Jackson had no case to answer.
- The 1970 Grand Final between Collingwood and Carlton was considered to be the most memorable Grand Final in VFL/AFL history. Collingwood had a great lead over Carlton during most of the game, however Carlton managed to come back and win the Grand Final by 10 points.

== Awards ==
=== Major awards ===
- The 1970 VFL Premiership team was Carlton.
- The VFL's leading goalkicker was Peter Hudson of Hawthorn who kicked 146 goals.
- The winner of the 1970 Brownlow Medal was Peter Bedford of South Melbourne with 25 votes.
- North Melbourne took the "wooden spoon" in 1970.
- The reserves premiership was won by Melbourne for the second consecutive year. Melbourne 16.10 (106) defeated Richmond 16.8 (104) in the Grand Final, held as a curtain-raiser to the seniors Grand Final at the Melbourne Cricket Ground on 26 September.

=== Leading goalkickers ===
- Numbers highlighted in blue indicates the player led the goalkicking at the end of that round.
- DNP = did not play in that round.

	Player	1	2	3	4	5	6	7	8	9	10	11	12	13	14	15	16	17	18	19	20	21	22	SF	PF	GF	Total
1	Peter Hudson	8_{8}	4_{12}	8_{20}	3_{23}	6_{29}	8_{37}	3_{40}	13_{53}	6_{59}	5_{64}	7_{71}	3_{74}	3_{77}	9_{86}	8_{94}	11_{105}	2_{107}	9_{116}	6_{122}	4_{126}	9_{135}	11_{146}				146
2	Peter McKenna	11_{11}	7_{18}	6_{24}	7_{31}	1_{32}	DNP	DNP	8_{40}	5_{45}	5_{50}	7_{57}	6_{63}	4_{67}	5_{72}	4_{76}	3_{79}	3_{82}	9_{91}	9_{100}	12_{112}	7_{119}	9_{128}	9_{137}		6_{143}	143
3	Alex Jesaulenko	9_{9}	6_{15}	6_{21}	5_{26}	4_{30}	10_{40}	3_{43}	4_{47}	3_{50}	6_{56}	7_{63}	3_{66}	0_{66}	1_{67}	2_{69}	9_{78}	3_{81}	4_{85}	1_{86}	4_{90}	5_{95}	5_{100}	8_{108}	4_{112}	3_{115}	115
4	Doug Wade	6_{6}	3_{9}	7_{16}	4_{20}	5_{25}	5_{30}	DNP	DNP	3_{33}	3_{36}	5_{41}	DNP	DNP	7_{48}	2_{50}	9_{59}	4_{63}	2_{65}	2_{67}	3_{70}	4_{74}	0_{74}				74
5	John Sudholz	DNP	DNP	DNP	2_{2}	4_{6}	3_{9}	5_{14}	3_{17}	3_{20}	1_{21}	3_{24}	3_{27}	6_{33}	2_{35}	5_{40}	0_{40}	3_{43}	2_{45}	3_{48}	4_{52}	4_{56}	1_{21}	3_{60}			60
6	Syd Jackson	DNP	DNP	3_{3}	4_{7}	1_{8}	6_{14}	1_{15}	4_{19}	4_{23}	2_{25}	3_{28}	2_{30}	3_{33}	4_{37}	0_{37}	DNP	DNP	2_{39}	0_{39}	2_{41}	5_{46}	1_{47}	1_{48}	6_{54}	1_{55}	55
7	Peter Bedford	2_{2}	0_{2}	3_{5}	3_{8}	2_{10}	3_{13}	4_{17}	0_{17}	1_{18}	1_{19}	5_{24}	3_{27}	3_{30}	3_{33}	1_{34}	1_{35}	1_{36}	2_{38}	2_{40}	3_{43}	4_{47}	0_{47}	3_{50}			50
8	Alex Ruscuklic	2_{2}	1_{3}	1_{4}	4_{8}	0_{8}	1_{9}	DNP	DNP	7_{16}	8_{24}	3_{27}	1_{28}	1_{29}	2_{31}	2_{33}	5_{38}	1_{39}	3_{42}	3_{45}	2_{47}	0_{47}	2_{49}				49
9	Bob Keddie	2_{2}	1_{3}	0_{3}	3_{6}	1_{7}	2_{9}	0_{9}	3_{12}	3_{15}	0_{15}	3_{18}	4_{22}	3_{25}	0_{25}	3_{28}	4_{32}	2_{34}	1_{35}	2_{37}	4_{41}	3_{44}	3_{47}				47
10	George Bisset	3_{3}	5_{8}	2_{10}	1_{11}	3_{14}	1_{15}	3_{18}	2_{20}	4_{24}	0_{24}	2_{26}	3_{29}	1_{30}	2_{32}	0_{32}	1_{33}	3_{36}	3_{39}	0_{39}	5_{44}	1_{45}	DNP				45

== Sources ==
- "1970 VFL season". AFL Tables.
- "1970 VFL season". Australian Football.
