= Beissel =

Beissel is a surname. Notable people with the surname include:

- Georg Conrad Beissel (1691–1768), a German-born religious leader in Pennsylvania, U.S.
- Graeme Beissel (born 1941), Australian rules footballer
- Henry Beissel (1929–2025), Canadian writer
- Heribert Beissel (1933–2021), German conductor
- Simone Beissel (born 1953), Luxembourgish politician
- Tom Beissel (born 1994), Dutch professional footballer

== See also ==
- Beissel von Gymnich is also the name of an old German aristocratic family.
- Beisel
