= Donric Group =

- Parent: Richard Baird
- Founded: March 1980
- Headquarters: Sunbury
- Service area: Victoria; Queensland
- Service type: Bus & coach operator
- Depots: Atherton; Ayr; Bowen; Cairns; Gisborne; Ingham; Innisfail; Kyneton; Mirani; Mission Beach; Ravenshoe; Romsey; Sunbury
- Fleet: 319 (December 2023)
- Operator: Sunbury Coaches; Coach Tours of Australia; Organ’s Coaches; Trans North Bus & Coach; Bowen Transit; Gisborne Transit
- Website: www.donric.com.au

The Donric Group is an Australian owner of bus and coach companies in Victoria and Queensland. The group comprises 5 companies with over 250 vehicles and 300 staff.

== History ==
The Donric Group was formed in March 1980 when Don McKenzie and Richard Baird purchased eight school buses from WJ Treweek to form the Sunbury Bus Service.

In 1989 Coach Tours of Australia was established as a coach charter company. In March 1989 Sweet's, Bacchus Marsh was purchased and renamed Bacchus Marsh Coaches.

In 1994 Swanlink Coachlines, Swan Hill was acquired with two V/Line contracts. It was sold in November 2007 to the Pickering Group, owners of BusBiz.

In 2000 Thege Coach Charter, Ballarat was purchased and renamed Gold Bus Ballarat. In 2001 Begonia City Coaches, Ballarat was acquired and incorporated into Gold Bus Ballarat. In October 2007 Organ's Bus Service, Kyneton was purchased.

In June 2010, Trans North Bus & Coach in North Queensland was purchased. In July 2010, Coopers Bus Service of Mirani and G&JE O'Neill of Finch Hatten were purchased, followed in October 2010 by Hasties Bus Service of Innisfail, and in January 2011 Henderson's of Ayr. All have been brought under the Trans North Bus & Coach brand.

In September 2019, Bacchus Marsh Coaches and Gold Bus Ballarat were sold to Christians Bus Co. Don McKenzie sold his interests in the remaining Donric Group businesses to Richard Baird, who took 100% ownership of the Donric Group.

On 1 July 2022, Donric Group took over bus services in Gisborne, operating as Gisborne Transit.

== Companies ==
Companies which have been acquired by the Donric Group include:

- Sweet's, Bacchus Marsh
- Begonia City Coaches, Ballarat
- Thege Coach Charter, Ballarat
- Organ's Bus Service, Kyneton
- Sovereign City Coaches, Ballarat
- Tantau, Ballarat
- Jones, Ballarat
- Trans North Bus & Coach, Ingham
- Cooper's Bus Service, Mirani
- O'Neill, Finch Hatten
- Hasties Bus Service, Innisfail
- Hendo's Bus Service, Ayr

Companies currently operated by the Donric Group include:

- Sunbury Coaches
- Coach Tours of Australia
- Organ's Coaches
- Trans North Bus & Coach
- Bowen Transit
- Gisborne Transit

== Depots ==
- Sunbury Bus Service / Gisborne Transit: Romsey, Sunbury, Riddells Creek, Gisborne
- Organ's Bus Service, Gisborne, Kyneton, Romsey
- Trans North Bus & Coach: Atherton, Ayr, Bowen, Cairns, Ingham, Innisfail, Mirani, Mission Beach, Ravenshoe

== Fleet ==
As at December 2023 the Donric Group operated 319 buses and coaches.

== See also ==
- Buses in Melbourne
- List of Victorian Bus Companies
- List of Queensland Bus Companies
- List of Melbourne bus routes
