= Peter Falconer =

Peter Falconer may refer to:

- Peter Falconer (politician) (born 1943)
- Peter Falconer (footballer) (born 1937)
