= Bruce Lake =

Australian rules footballer

Personal information
- Full name: Bruce G. Lake
- Born: 9 June 1948 (age 78)
- Original team: Metung
- Height: 189 cm (6 ft 2 in)
- Weight: 80 kg (176 lb)
- Positions: Forward, ruckman

Playing career^{1}
Years	Club	Games (Goals)
1968–1970	Essendon	30 (36)
1971	Footscray	2 (0)
1971-1973	Waverley	16 (32)
Total		48 (68)
- ^{1} Playing statistics correct to the end of 1971.

Bruce Lake (born 9 June 1948) is a former Australian rules footballer who played with Essendon and Footscray in the Victorian Football League (VFL).

Lake, who came from Metung, made his league debut in the fifth round of the 1968 VFL season. Four rounds later he would be joined in the side by his younger brother Eddie.

Although primarily a forward, Lake was also used as a ruckman and was Essendon's 19th man in the 1968 VFL Grand Final.

He switched to Footscray in 1971 but played just two games and finished the season at Waverley in the Victorian Football Association.
