= Kekovich =

Kekovich is a surname. Notable people with the surname include:

- Brian Kekovich (1946–2025), Australian rules footballer
- Sam Kekovich (born 1950), Australian rules footballer, commentator, and media personality
