= Graeme Anderson =

Graeme Anderson is the name of:

- Graeme Anderson (footballer, born 1939) (1939–2022), Australian rules footballer with Carlton
- Graeme Anderson (footballer, born 1953) (born 1953), Australian rules footballer with Collingwood

== See also ==
- Graham Anderson (1929–2012), Canadian scholar
