= Bruce Williams (footballer) =

Australian rules footballer and coach (1939–2022)

Personal information
- Full name: Bruce Frederick Williams
- Born: 26 April 1939
- Died: 25 July 2022 (aged 83); Burleigh Heads, Queensland, Australia
- Original team: Morwell
- Height: 175 cm (5 ft 9 in)
- Weight: 70 kg (154 lb)
- Position: Rover

Playing career^{1}
Years	Club	Games (Goals)
1959–1964	Carlton	62 (56)
- ^{1} Playing statistics correct to the end of 1964.

Bruce Frederick Williams (26 April 1939 – 25 July 2022) was an Australian rules footballer who played with Carlton in the Victorian Football League (VFL).

== Family ==
He married Sylvia Leslie Sewell in 1961.

== Football ==
=== Carlton (VFL) ===
Williams played 16 games in his first VFL season, in 1959, after coming to the club from Morwell.

He received few opportunities to play senior football over the next two seasons but was a regular member of the team in 1962 and contributed nine goals in the finals series. A rover, he kicked three goals of those goals for Carlton in the 1962 VFL Grand Final, the most from his team, but it wasn't enough to secure a win.

He made just one appearance in 1964 before he was cleared to Morwell, his original club.

=== Morwell (SGFL) ===
He returned to the Morwell Football Club in the South Gippsland Football League.

Although he arrived to take up a position of assistant coach, he was the team's coach later in the year when Graham Donaldson was in hospital. In 1966 he was appointed Morwell's permanent senior coach.
