= AFL Players Association =

Representative body of the Australian Football League

AFLPA
- AFL Players Association
- Founded: 1974; 52 years ago
- Headquarters: Melbourne, Victoria, Australia
- Key people: Darcy Moore, President; Paul Marsh, CEO
- Website: AFLPlayers.com.au

The AFL Players Association (AFLPA, also simply known as AFL Players) is the representative body for all current and past professional Australian Football League (AFL) and AFL Women's (AFLW) players.

The AFLPA promotes and protects its members through initiatives including workplace relations, advocacy, career development, and various community events.

Players' welfare is the primary function of AFLPA, and it aims to ensure the sustainability and integrity of the game by investing in the personal development of past, present, and future AFL footballers.

Established in its current form in 1974, the AFL Players Association provides a means for the AFL and Clubs to consult with players, lobby for players, and collaborate on rules and other issues affecting AFL players.

The current CEO of the AFLPA is Paul Marsh and current President is Darcy Moore.

== History ==
The formation of a representative body for Victorian Football League (VFL) players was first attempted in 1955. The VFL successfully opposed the registration of this body and the fledgling union was disbanded.

The AFLPA in its current form was established in 1974 at the behest of players Geoff Pryor (Essendon), Gareth Andrews (Geelong), Des Meagher (Hawthorn) and David McKay (Carlton). In 1979, the association appointed three key positions to lead the organisation:

- Peter Allen, Administration, Marketing and Public Relations
- Len Coysh, Industrial Relations
- Bryan Roberts, Legal

At this point, the only source of funding was the annual $35 membership fee.

=== Fight for recognition ===
In late 1980, the VFL withdrew recognition of the AFLPA, effectively leaving the players without a negotiating body.

In 1981, a pre-season match between Essendon and Fitzroy was threatened with strike action by the association over the VFL's non-recognition of the body. The VFL halted the proposed strike by agreeing to recognise the association as the negotiating body for all players.

In 1984, Bryan Roberts resigned. Len Coysh left one year later. Peter Allen remained to run the association and stayed committed to the cause for two decades before resigning to head the AFL Coaches Association until his death in June 2007.

=== Getting organised ===
By 1990, the VFL had renamed itself the Australian Football League (AFL). The AFLPA followed suit, and signed its first Collective Bargaining Agreement (CBA) in tumultuous circumstances, as it worked through the negotiation process with the AFL. The CBA was eventually finalised and called a Deed of Agreement.

In July 1992, the AFLPA negotiated a new CBA, which included a minimum salary of $7,500, minimum payments of $750 per senior game, and $250 for a reserves game. This signified the start of what was to be a key feature of AFLPA's function.

=== Industrial turmoil ===
The AFL withdrew recognition of the association in January 1993, prompting a historic meeting of players at the Radisson Hotel in Melbourne.

The AFL had informed players that the standard contract would no longer exist and that all contracts would be negotiated individually between the clubs and the players. The players again threatened strike action.

In March 1993, the AFL and AFLPA appeared before the Australian Industrial Relations Commission (AIRC). At this hearing it was determined that a dispute between the parties did exist and that the AIRC had jurisdiction to determine an Award. The AFL and AFLPA were instructed by the AIRC to attempt negotiations away from the AIRC environment. These negotiations led to the CBA of 1994–1995.

== Present development ==
In 1995, negotiations began on a new Collective Bargaining Agreement. The new CBA period was from 1 November 1995 to 31 October 1998, and increased minimum salaries for season 1996 to $15,000 and match payments to $1,000 per senior game. These payments further increased to $20,000 and $1,500 in 1997, and $20,680 and $1,550 in 1998 respectively. The players gained an increase in the share of revenue from marketing activities and an increase in injury and illness benefits.

Former logo of the AFLPA (2000–14)

By this time, 99 per cent of all AFL players were members of the association.

In 1998, the association underwent significant change. Long-serving president Justin Madden retired from football, and Fremantle's Peter Mann took over the presidency. Peter Allen resigned as CEO after a twenty-year involvement. Former North Melbourne and Hawthorn player, Andrew Demetriou, was appointed as the new CEO.

In 2016, the AFLPA welcomed more than 200 female players from the upcoming AFL Women's competition into its membership. The association is responsible for managing women's pay and condition deals.

=== CEO ===
==== Andrew Demetriou, 1998–2000 ====
Former North Melbourne and Hawthorn player Andrew Demetriou was appointed as the new CEO. The new administration set about examining the views and wishes of players so that they could negotiate a new CBA (1998–2003) with the AFL.

The association developed a statement of purposes and objectives to assist with CBA negotiations. It also assembled an advisory board of industry leaders to direct the association into the future.

The new objectives and purposes focused on the need to enhance the game of Australian football and ensure that players played a strong role in the development of the game, received fair terms and conditions, and were apportioned an equitable share of revenue.

Through player feedback the association was able to identify the following key areas as its chart for the future:

- Player development
- Retirement
- Education and training

In 1998, the AFLPA achieved a membership of 100 per cent for the first time in its history.

In late 2006, the AFLPA opened up a new membership category allowing past VFL / AFL players to become members of the AFLPA.

==== Robert Kerr, 2000–2004 ====
When Andrew Demetriou left the AFLPA to join the AFL, Robert Kerr became AFLPA's CEO, taking up the position in June 2000. Previously, Kerr had been the AFLPA's executive director (Player Development). A significant focus for the AFLPA at this time was to implement the player support programs and ensure that the shift to full-time professionalism was balanced by efforts to prepare players for life after football.

In 2003, a new CBA was negotiated between the AFLPA and the AFL. The key principles for the Collective Bargaining Agreement (2003–2008) reflected a responsible attempt to balance the interests of the players with the realities facing the competition.

==== Brendon Gale, 2004–2009 ====
In 2004, Brendon Gale took over from Peter Mann as General Manager (Football).

Following that, Kerr announced his resignation to the AFLPA Executive Committee after five years of service. Former Richmond player, AFLPA President and AFLPA General Manager (Football) Brendon Gale then took over as CEO.

==== Matthew Finnis, 2009–2014 ====
On 13 October 2009, Matthew Finnis was named AFLPA Chief Executive Officer, replacing Brendon Gale who resigned from the position to become Richmond Football Club's CEO.

Finnis is a former sports lawyer with Lander & Rogers, advising sport and recreation organisations on insurance requirements, risk management and associated liability issues. In addition to that, he was the sponsorship services manager for the SunSmart and Quit campaigns following his work as a sporting administrator in basketball, sailing and surf lifesaving.

Finnis resigned from the position in February 2014 to take up the CEO role at the St Kilda Football Club. Ian Prendergast was named interim CEO.

==== Paul Marsh, 2014–present ====
The AFL Players Association appointed a new boss, with Australian Cricketers' Association CEO Paul Marsh announced as successor to Matt Finnis. He started in the role in September 2014.

== Player Development Program ==
=== In-house ===
In 2005, AFLPA moved all services provided under the Player Development Program in-house, employing experts in the fields of education, player welfare and career transition.

In 2006, a new Collective Bargaining Agreement (2007–2011) was negotiated with the AFL. The key principles of the five-year agreement focused on delivering stability and opportunity, ahead of a crucial period where the game will push for unprecedented national growth.

=== AFLPA Induction Camp ===
The AFLPA organised an Induction Camp on 10 January 2010 to introduce new draftees into the AFL system. The two-day event, held at the Melbourne Cricket Ground (MCG), was attended by draftees from each of the 17 AFL teams including newly formed Gold Coast Suns. Some of the topics covered were:

- Life skills
- Accountability and responsibility
- Depression
- Road safety
- Illicit Drugs & Gambling
- Anti-doping
- Community work
- Diversity in the AFL

=== AFLPA Indigenous Camp ===
In 2000, AFLPA created the AFLPA Indigenous Camp to support indigenous players and increase their profiles as good role models. The AFLPA Indigenous Camp has since been held biannually. It has been held at:

Year	Location
2000	Melbourne (Victoria)
2002	Uluru (Northern Territory)
2004	Broome (Western Australia)
2006	Townsville (Queensland)
2009	Darwin (Northern Territory)
2011	Redfern (New South Wales)

The Camp consists of a variety of workshops that includes:

- Indigenous Leadership Program (ILP)
- Financial planning
- Indigenous history

Upon completion of the camp, the All-Stars Indigenous team play against an AFL club in an exhibition game. The All-Stars have played Carlton (2003), Western Bulldogs (2005) and Essendon (2007). The 2011 team featured a star-studded line-up of the AFL's top Indigenous players including Indigenous All-Stars captain and Sydney Swans co-captain Adam Goodes, Hawthorn's Lance Franklin and Cyril Rioli, Melbourne's Liam Jurrah and new draftees including Curtly Hampton from the GWS Giants and recently named Gold Coast Suns recruit Harley Bennell. Due to unsuitable playing conditions being brought on by heavy rain and Cyclone Yasi, the 2011 team was unable to play against Richmond despite having the match moved from TIO Stadium in Darwin to Traeger Park Oval in Alice Springs.

== Events ==
=== AFLPA MVP Awards ===
The AFLPA Most Valuable Player Awards is an annual event recognising excellence in players by players. Winners of the Leigh Matthews trophy is selected by peers through a voting system. Past winners include Andrew McLeod (2001), Ben Cousins (2005), five-time winner Gary Ablett (2007, 2008, 2009, 2012 and 2013) and Dane Swan (2010).

=== AFLPA Madden Medal ===
Named in honour of two former AFL Players Association presidents and champion Essendon and Carlton players, Simon Madden and Justin Madden, the Madden Medal recognises outstanding achievement on and off the field by an AFL player over the entire course of his career.

The AFLPA launched the Madden Medal in 2007 to annually recognise the achievements and contributions of retiring AFL players through four award categories: Football Achievement Award, Personal Development Award, Community Spirit Award and the top accolade, the Madden Medal.

As of 2022, the most recent winner of the Madden Medal is former Carlton and Adelaide player Eddie Betts.

Recipients:

Year	Recipient
2007	Glenn Archer
2008	Robert Harvey
2009	Michael O'Loughlin
2010	Brett Kirk
2011	Cameron Ling
2012	Luke Power
2013	Jude Bolton
2014	Lenny Hayes
2015	Chris Judd
2016	Matthew Pavlich
2017	Nick Riewoldt
2018	Brendon Goddard
2019	Luke Hodge
2020	Gary Ablett Jr.
2021	Eddie Betts

=== Mike Fitzpatrick Scholarship ===
Started in 2001, the Mike Fitzpatrick Scholarship—named after Carlton premiership captain and AFL chairman Mike Fitzpatrick—awards young players who have shown a combination of football and academic excellence.

== Well-being ==
=== Beyond Blue Depression Awareness program ===
In partnership with the AFL and AFL Players Association (AFLPA), Beyond Blue developed and delivered a depression-awareness program within the AFL, incorporating information sessions for players, coaches and other football club staff, and the Beyond Blue Cup match.

=== Illicit Drug policy ===
In 2005, the Illicit Drug policy was introduced to support the Anti-Doping Code, introduced in 1995, that governed AFL players. The voluntary code, which test players for illicit drug use out of the competition, aims at reinforcing players as healthy elite sportsmen and to prevent the sport from falling into disrepute. The code is further strengthened by volunteer AFL players who have agreed to a trial of holiday hair testing for illicit drugs—a first in the international sports industry. While all Australian sports are subject to in-competition testing, the AFL is one of only three sports in Australia—the other two being cricket and rugby—that conducts out-of-competition testing. Although the code has drawn criticism from the federal government for its three-strikes policy, it received commendations from others who cite it as a "prospect of rehabilitation and caters for medical confidentiality."

== Professional opportunities ==
=== Accelerate program ===
In 2010, the AFLPA supported Anthony Rock with his Accelerate program which provided a unique opportunity for 20 young men rejected by the AFL draft the first time around by putting together an infrastructure of expertise in a bid to keep the game's most talented second-tier players from 18 to 23 in the correct physical and emotional state to win a second chance. In partnership with sports consulting group Infront, three major sponsors, and the AFLPA's support, Rock was able to set up partnerships with seven VFL clubs and worked with 20 footballers hoping to be drafted.

== Corporate social responsibility ==
The AFLPA is involved in a number of initiatives including national campaigns and on-going projects that serves to benefit the community. Here are some examples of previous campaigns:

Campaign	What it is about
YSAS- AFL House	In 2007, AFLPA and the State Government Office of Housing engaged the Youth Substance Abuse Service(YSAS), a not for profit organisation, to research and design a model of service delivery for a housing and personal development program for homeless young people. The service was to be administered by an experienced non-government organisation and conducted in cooperation with the AFLPA.
Ladder	In 2007, AFLPA and AFL Foundation came together to tackle the issue of youth homelessness. Through projects in Victoria and South Australia, Ladder was able to offer support and housing to over 40 homeless youth in self-contained accommodation. Ladder continues to receive support by the greater football community, the government and private organisations.
Just Think	In 2009, AFLPA launched the ‘Just Think’ campaign, with the support of the Australian Government, aimed at Australian youth to tackle alcohol fuelled street violence. A widely publiced advertising campaign running throughout the AFL 2009 Finals brought together 8 AFL Captains.
Zaidee's Rainbow Foundation	In February 2009, the AFLPA showed support for the not-for-profit organisation, Zaidee, by raising awareness of the importance of supporting organ and tissue donation. In a match in Darwin, the Indigenous All-Stars, including Captain Andrew McLeod, wore Zaidee's rainbow shoelaces.

== Player representation ==
=== Free Agency ===
In early 2010, the AFLPA and AFL came to an agreement which will see the introduction of free agency following the 2012 season.

From the end of the 2012 season, any player who is delisted will automatically become a free agent, eligible to sign with any AFL Club [10]. Players who have eight years with an AFL club will be eligible to become free agents when they are coming out of contract.

The introduction of free agency does not affect the salary cap, draft system, list sizes, or revenue sharing.

=== Etihad Stadium ===
In 2010, the AFLPA requested that the AFL consider relocating games from Etihad Stadium if the venue's surface didn't improve, following complaints that the slippery grounds were a risk as players were "slipping over like B-grade amateurs."

=== High-profile cases ===
The AFLPA represents its members in a number of high-profile cases.

Player	Case	Outcome
Steven Baker	The AFLPA condemned the character slur made by the AFL's legal counsel, Andrew Tinney, SC, on St Kilda's Steven Baker during his AFL Tribunal hearing as inappropriate and irrelevant to his case.	Steven Baker was eventually handed a 12-week suspension which was reduced to nine weeks in which the AFLPA viewed as still being too rigid as there were a lot of "grey areas" concerning the case.
Jason Akermanis	In May 2010, the AFLPA took a stand to the anti-gay comments made by Jason Akermanis by telling the ABC that his opinion is not reflective of the majority of the AFL community.	When Akermanis was eventually sacked by the Western Bulldogs in July 2010, the AFLPA expressed their disappointment that Akermanis, a Brownlow Medallist, was not given the opportunity to play in another finals campaign.
Andrew Lovett	St Kilda made a sudden decision to terminate Andrew while he was facing rape charges.	The AFLPA questioned the legal right of the club to terminate Lovett under the circumstances and highlighted that "basic principles of fairness and due process" has to be applied before submitting to disciplinary action. In March 2010, the AFLPA expressed disappointment when a grievance tribunal coordinated by the AFL was boycotted by St Kilda.
Gary Ablett	In April 2010, Gary's image was used without permission by the media.	The AFLPA defended Gary Ablett's right to ownership of his public image by requesting the Gold Coast Bulletin to publicly apologise for an unapproved digitally altered poster of the Geelong Football Club player.
Nathan Bock	In August 2010, Nathan moved to Gold Coast Suns and became the subject of controversy.	The AFLPA expressed the need for rival clubs to support players, such as Nathan Bock, in his decision to move to Gold Coast Suns from Adelaide Crows, as it encouraged a healthy level of competitiveness in the game.

== Presidents ==
- Geoff Pryor (1974–1975)
- Gareth Andrews (1975–1976)
- Don Scott (1977–1978)
- Ron Alexander (1978–1980)
- Michael Moncrieff (1980–1987)
- Simon Madden (1987–1990)
- Justin Madden (1990–1997)
- Peter Mann (1997–2000)
- Brendon Gale (2000–2003)
- Peter Bell (2003–2007)
- Joel Bowden (2007–2009)
- Brett Burton (2010)
- Luke Power (2011)
- Luke Ball (2012–2014)
- Matthew Pavlich (2015–2017)
- Patrick Dangerfield (2018–2025)
- Darcy Moore (2025–)

== See also ==
- Don McKenzie Information on pre-Players Association pay dispute with VFL in 1970.
