= Don McKenzie (footballer, born 1939) =

Australian rules footballer (1939–2026)

Personal information
- Born: 23 March 1939; Mickleham, Victoria, Australia
- Died: 23 September 2026 (aged 87)
- Original team: Essendon Baptists-St John's
- Height: 188 cm (6 ft 2 in)
- Weight: 85 kg (187 lb)
- Position: Ruckman

Playing career
Years	Club	Games (Goals)
1960–1974	Essendon	267 (23)

Representative team honours
Years	Team	Games (Goals)
1967	Victoria	1

Career highlights
- Essendon captain: 1969; Essendon vice-captain: 1968, 1970; Essendon best and fairest: 1966; Australian Football World Tour: 1968

Don McKenzie (23 March 1939 – 23 September 2026) was a Australian rules footballer who played 266 senior games for the Essendon Football Club from 1960 to 1974. He won the Essendon best and fairest award in 1966 and was named team captain for the 1969 VFL season.

== Career ==
McKenzie made his debut, as 19th man, for Essendon against Melbourne at Windy Hill on 4 June 1960 when he replaced the ruckman Bob Dunlop at three-quarter time, having only played Australian rules football for three years. He went on to play 266 games for Essendon; he played 94 consecutive senior games from 1965 to 1969.

He won premierships in 1962 and in 1965, as well as winning the club's best and fairest in 1966. He was captain of the Essendon losing Grand Final team in 1968, in place of the injured Ken Fraser. He was one of the best players for the Victorian team that played Tasmania in Tasmania in June 1967. McKenzie was also selected for the second international tour of "The Galahs" in 1968.

== Dispute over player payments ==
McKenzie captained the club in the 1969 season. He was removed from his captaincy in 1970 when he and four of his teammates, Geoff Gosper, Darryl Gerlach, Geoff Pryor, and Barry Davis, demanded better pay and conditions. Once the issue was resolved (by the time of the second round in 1970), McKenzie was appointed vice captain for 1970 (with Barry Davis appointed captain). According to Maplestone,

[there was a] sensational beginning to the [1970] season when a group of five senior players—Don McKenzie (the previous year's captain), Geoff Pryor, Darryl Gerlach, Barry Davis (the year before's vice-captain) and Geoff Gosper—requested an increase in match payments much higher than allowed by the League.
The players wanted three dollars for each training session instead of one dollar, and a basic forty dollars per match until fifty games with increments coming each twenty-five games after that.
When their request was rejected they all decided to stand out of football. Essendon had initiated a move in the League for an increase in players' payments and advised the players that consideration of their request would be given when the League finally made a decision. The [Essendon] committee was unanimously in favour of the increase but under League regulations were not allowed to give it.
This was conveyed to the players who then advised the committee that unless their demands were met, the players of the 1969 list would in sympathy refuse to play in a practice match against South Adelaide.
After further discussions, the players decided to play, but, in a later letter, the five senior players submitted their retirement as players. They were not considered for the first match against Carlton.
During a sensational five hours at Essendon on Thursday the 2nd of April, the club threatened to split wide open. The five rebels turned up for training but were not invited to the players' dinner. As well, the club named a new acting captain, John Williams and acting vice-captain, Charlie Payne.
Chairman of selectors, Harry Hunter, when asked the reaction of the selectors said tersely:- "You may need an Obituary Column. It could be the end of them."
But then four days later, the row was settled and the five were all chosen in the second game against Footscray. Davis became captain on the vote of the players and committee with McKenzie as his deputy.
The League, by this time, had agreed on an increased minimum payment to be allowed to be paid to players of thirty-five dollars and the players were advised of the increased payments. In addition, the [Essendon] committee decided to set up a testimonial fund, in addition to the regular [VFL player's] provident fund, by which [Essendon] players would have an amount put aside for them to be collected on retirement only.
Alf Brown in The Herald was very critical of the treatment of the players. He wrote: "Essendon have assets of $115,000 but claim they want this money to buy a new ground. They have been talking about shifting ever since I have been writing football ... The players have been treated like little school boys."
Club president Allan Hird, while admitting that Essendon could have afforded more, was understandably not prepared to break the League rules. He was particularly annoyed with one player who he refused to name, who he described as a "paragon of virtue to the general public but the biggest disappointment."

=== Parallel dispute at Collingwood ===
Two other VFL players, Collingwood's ruckman Len Thompson (later, the 1972 Brownlow Medallist) and its captain Des Tuddenham (later, the captain-coach of Essendon 1972–75), also went on "strike" at that time, and did not train with Collingwood for three weeks. Both players "eventually agreed to the compromise involved in the League's offer, but Tuddenham was stripped of the captaincy".

== Retirement ==
McKenzie played his last game for Essendon firsts in 1974 (aged 35) and following his retirement he was given a testimonial dinner. However, he returned to Essendon in 1978, aged 39, and played an entire season with the reserves. In his first reserves game he had 16 possessions.

He was made a life member of the Essendon Football Club in 1969. He served on the club committee from 1981 to 1996, and also as vice-president of the club.

During his playing career McKenzie was employed as an inspector of interstate transport vehicles and their drivers by Victoria's Country Roads Board. After his retirement from football, he and a friend, Richard Baird, founded Sunbury Bus Service in 1980.

== Death ==
McKenzie died on 23 September 2026 at the age of 87.
