= Crichton Medal =

Award for the best and fairest player of the Essendon Football Club

- Awarded for: The best and fairest player of the Essendon Football Club
- Location: Crown Palladium Ballroom
- Country: Australia
- Presented by: Essendon Football Club
- First award: 1897
- Currently held by: Zach Merrett
- Website: Essendon Football Club Honours

The Crichton Medal is the best and fairest award for the Australian rules football team the Essendon Football Club. Since 1959 or 1960, it has been known officially as the W. S. Crichton Medal. The naming of the award is in honour of Wally Crichton, a former administrator for Essendon (who was a committeeman from 1926 to 1931, vice-president from 1932 to 1940, and president from 1941 to 1959). The voting system as of the 2017 AFL season consists of five coaches, giving each player a ranking from zero to five after each match. Players can receive a maximum of 25 votes for a game.

Essendon's best-and-fairest award has been awarded since 1897, although records of winners between 1897 and 1921 are incomplete. The award was suspended during World War I.

== Recipients ==
^	Denotes current player
+	Player won Brownlow Medal in same season

Season	Recipient(s)	Ref.
1897	—N/a	^{[a]}
1898	—N/a	^{[a]}
1899	—N/a	^{[a]}
1900	—N/a	^{[a]}
1901	Albert Thurgood	
1902	Hugh Gavin	
1903	—N/a	^{[a]}
1904	—N/a	^{[a]}
1905	—N/a	^{[a]}
1906	Jack McKenzie	
1907	—N/a	^{[a]}
1908	Bill Busbridge	
1909	Bill Busbridge (2)	
1910	—N/a	^{[a]}
1911	Ernie Cameron	
1912	Ernie Cameron (2)	
1913	Fred Baring	
1914	—N/a	^{[a]}
1915	—N/a	^{[a]}
1916	—N/a	^{[b]}
1917	—N/a	^{[b]}
1918	—N/a	^{[a]}
1919	—N/a	^{[a]}
1920	Jack Garden	
1921	—N/a	^{[a]}
1922	Tom Fitzmaurice	
1923	Tom Fitzmaurice (2)	
1924	Tom Fitzmaurice (3)	
1925	Greg Stockdale	
1926	Joe Harrison	
1927	Frank Maher	
1928	Norm Beckton	
1929	Howard Okey	
1930	Keith Forbes	
1931	Tom Clarke	
1932	Syd Carman	
1933	Paddy Walsh	
1934	Dick Reynolds+	
1935	Keith Forbes (2)	
1936	Dick Reynolds (2)	
1937	Dick Reynolds+ (3)	
1938	Dick Reynolds+ (4)	
1939	Dick Reynolds (5)	
1940	Hugh Torney	
1941	Wally Buttsworth	
1942	Dick Reynolds (6)	
1943	Dick Reynolds (7)	
1944	Perc Bushby	
1945	Wally Buttsworth (2)	
1946	Wally Buttsworth (3)	
1947	Bill Hutchison	
1948	Bill Hutchison (2)	
1949	John Coleman	
1950	Bill Hutchison (3)	
1951	Norm McDonald	
1952	Bill Hutchison+ (4)	
1953	Bill Hutchison+ (5)	
1954	John Gill	
1955	Bill Hutchison (6)	
1956	Bill Hutchison (7)	
1957	Reg Burgess	
1958	Jack Clarke	
1959	Hugh Mitchell	
1960	Reg Burgess (2)	
1961	John Birt	
1962	Jack Clarke (2)	
1963	Ken Fraser	
1964	Ken Fraser (2)	
1965	John Birt (2)	
1966	Don McKenzie	
1967	John Birt (3)	
1968	Barry Davis	
1969	Barry Davis (2)	
1970	Darryl Gerlach	
1971	Barry Davis (3)	
1972	Neville Fields	
1973	Andy Wilson	
1974	Graham Moss	
1975	Graham Moss (2)	
1976	Graham Moss+ (3)	
1977	Simon Madden	
1978	Ken Fletcher	
1979	Simon Madden (2)	
1980	Tim Watson	
1981	Neale Daniher	
1982	Terry Daniher	
1983	Simon Madden (3)	
1984	Simon Madden (4)	
1985	Tim Watson (2)	
1986	Glenn Hawker	
1987	Mark Thompson	
1988	Tim Watson (3)	
1989	Tim Watson (4)	
1990	Mark Thompson (2)	
1991	Alan Ezard	
1992	Mark Harvey	
1993	Gary O'Donnell	
1994	James Hird	
1995	James Hird (2)	
1996	James Hird+ (3)	
1997	Sean Denham	
1998	Damien Hardwick	
1999	Mark Mercuri	
2000	Dustin Fletcher	
2001	Jason Johnson	
2002	Mark Johnson	
2003	James Hird (4)	
2003	Scott Lucas	
2004	Adam McPhee	
2005	Jason Johnson (2)	
2006	Scott Lucas (2)	
2007	James Hird (5)	
2008	David Hille	
2009	Jobe Watson	
2010	Jobe Watson (2)	
2011	David Zaharakis	
2012	Jobe Watson (3)	
2013	Brendon Goddard	
2014	Dyson Heppell	
2015	Cale Hooker	
2016	Zach Merrett	
2017	Joe Daniher	
2018	Devon Smith	
2019	Zach Merrett (2)	
2020	Jordan Ridley	
2021	Zach Merrett (3)	
2022	Peter Wright^	
2023	Zach Merrett (4)	
2024	Zach Merrett (5)	
2025	Zach Merrett (6)	
2026	Zach Merrett (7)	

== Multiple winners ==
^	Denotes current player

Player	Medals	Seasons
Bill Hutchison	7	1947, 1948, 1950, 1952, 1953, 1955, 1956
Dick Reynolds	7	1934, 1936, 1937, 1938, 1939, 1942, 1943
Zach Merrett^	7	2016, 2019, 2021, 2023, 2024, 2025, 2026
James Hird	5	1994, 1995, 1996, 2003, 2007
Simon Madden	4	1977, 1979, 1983, 1984
Tim Watson	4	1980, 1985, 1988, 1989
John Birt	3	1961, 1965, 1967
Wally Buttsworth	3	1941, 1945, 1946
Barry Davis	3	1968, 1969, 1971
Tom Fitzmaurice	3	1922, 1923, 1924
Graham Moss	3	1974, 1975, 1976
Jobe Watson	3	2009, 2010, 2012
Reg Burgess	2	1957, 1960
Bill Busbridge	2	1908, 1909
Ernie Cameron	2	1911, 1912
Jack Clarke	2	1958, 1962
Keith Forbes	2	1930, 1935
Ken Fraser	2	1963, 1964
Jason Johnson	2	2001, 2005
Scott Lucas	2	2003, 2006
Mark Thompson	2	1987, 1990

== Notes ==
- ^{a} The best-and-fairest was first awarded in 1897; however, records from 1897 to 1921 are incomplete.
- ^{b} The Essendon Football Club did not participate in the 1916 and 1917 VFL seasons due to World War I.
