= Eddie Lake (footballer) =

Australian rules footballer (1951–2020)

Personal information
- Full name: Keith Edward Lake
- Born: 25 June 1951
- Died: 23 February 2020 (aged 68); Ipswich, Queensland
- Original team: Metung
- Height: 177 cm (5 ft 10 in)
- Weight: 75 kg (165 lb)
- Positions: Half-forward, centre

Playing career^{1}
Years	Club	Games (Goals)
1968–73	Essendon	39 (14)
- ^{1} Playing statistics correct to the end of 1973.

Keith Edward Lake (25 June 1951 – 23 February 2020) was an Australian rules footballer who played with Essendon in the Victorian Football League (VFL). Lake's brother, Bruce, also played VFL football for Essendon and Footscray. Lake spent six seasons with Essendon where he was in and out of the senior team. During that time, he won a reserves premiership in 1968, was named the club's most courageous player in 1970 and was awarded the reserves best and fairest in 1972. After leaving the Bombers, Lake played with Coburg in the Victorian Football Association (VFA), winning a premiership with them in his first year. He later moved to Queensland and played for Coorparoo and Southport, as well as representing Queensland.
