= Murray Kick =

Australian rules footballer and coach

Personal information
- Full name: Murray G. Kick
- Born: 5 December 1940
- Original team: Donald
- Height: 180 cm (5 ft 11 in)
- Weight: 73 kg (161 lb)

Playing career^{1}
Years	Club	Games (Goals)
1961–1965	Carlton	55 (9)
- ^{1} Playing statistics correct to the end of 1965.

Murray Kick (born 5 December 1940) is a former Australian rules footballer who played with Carlton in the Victorian Football League (VFL).

Kick, the son of former Carlton player Ned, made his senior debut for Carlton in 1961 and finished third in Carlton's 1962 "Best and Fairest" award, after playing 20 games during the season. Kick played on the wing in the 1962 VFL Grand Final loss to Essendon. The following year Kick appeared in 17 of a possible 18 games but would then struggle over the next two seasons with injury before leaving Carlton at the end of the 1965 VFL season.

Kick captain-coached Goulburn Valley Football League club Shepparton United from 1966 to 1968 and guided them to a premiership in his second year. Kick was then a long serving captain-coach with Lemnos, in the same league.
