= Howard Okey =

Australian rules footballer, born 1906

Personal information
- Full name: Howard Clement Okey
- Born: 12 February 1906; Kensington, Victoria
- Died: 3 March 1985 (aged 79); Strathmore, Victoria
- Original team: West Melbourne Juniors
- Height: 177 cm (5 ft 10 in)
- Weight: 69 kg (152 lb)

Playing career^{1}
Years	Club	Games (Goals)
1928–1934	Essendon	109 (52)
- ^{1} Playing statistics correct to the end of 1934.

Howard Clement Okey (12 February 1906 – 3 March 1985) was an Australian rules footballer who played for Essendon in the VFL.

Okey was a pacy centreman, winning Essendon's Best and Fairest award in 1929. He also represented Victoria at interstate football three times during his career.
