= Sunbury Bus Service =

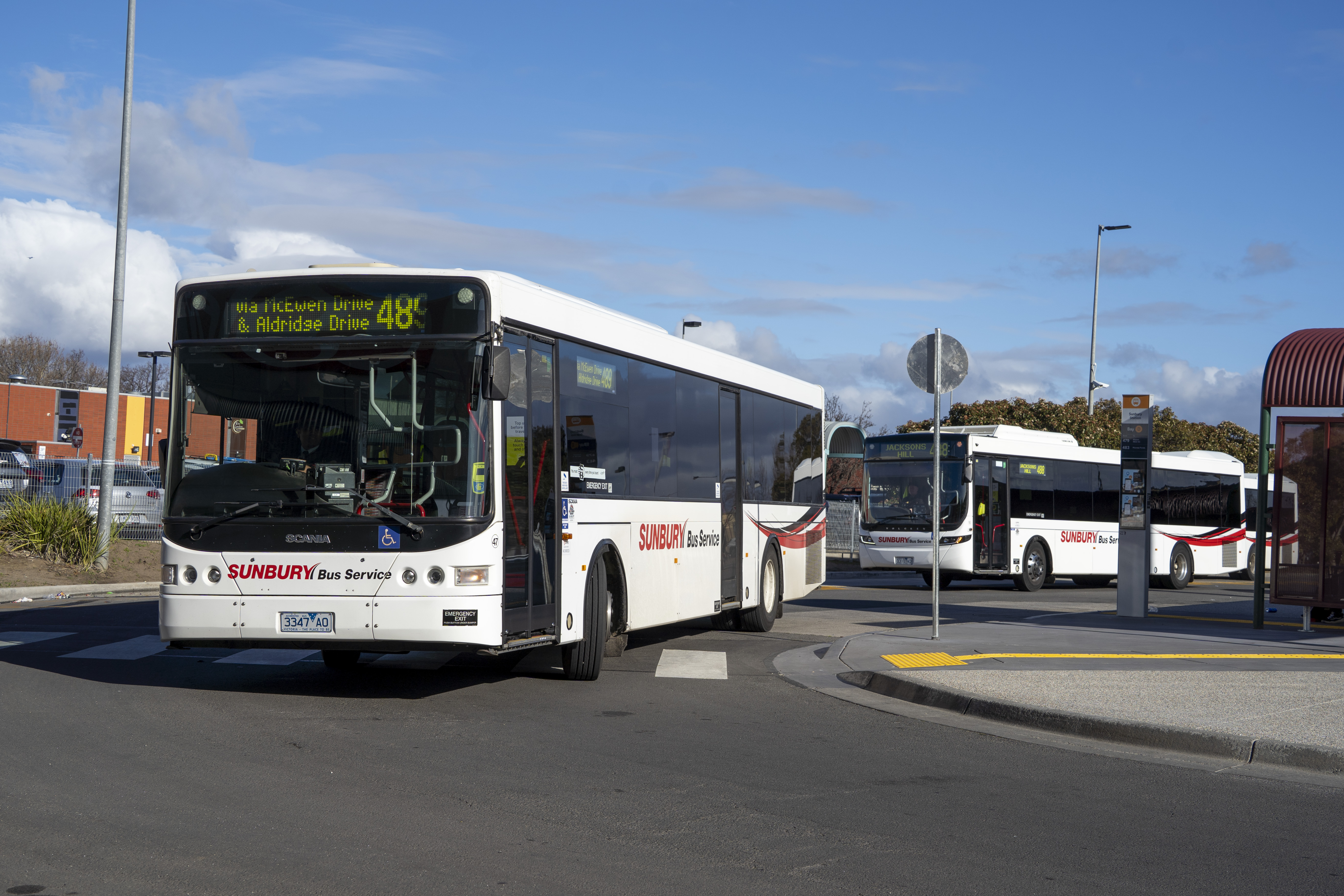
- Two Sunbury Bus Service Scania Volgren buses depart Sunbury bus interchange in August 2025
- Parent: Donric Group
- Commenced operation: March 1980
- Headquarters: Sunbury
- Service area: Western Melbourne
- Service type: Bus & coach operator
- Routes: 8
- Fleet: 108 (February 2023)
- Website: www.sunburycoaches.com.au

Sunbury Bus Service is a bus operator in Melbourne, Australia. It operates seven routes under contract to Public Transport Victoria. It is a subsidiary of the Donric Group.

== History ==
Sunbury Bus Service was formed by Richard Baird and Don McKenzie in March 1980 following the purchase of the business of WJ Treweek. It is today part of the Donric Group. In November 2025, It will commence operating services to Canberra as a contractor to FlixBus.

== Fleet ==
As at February 2023, the fleet consisted of 108 buses and coaches. Operator livery is white with red & black stripes while newer route buses have the PTV livery.

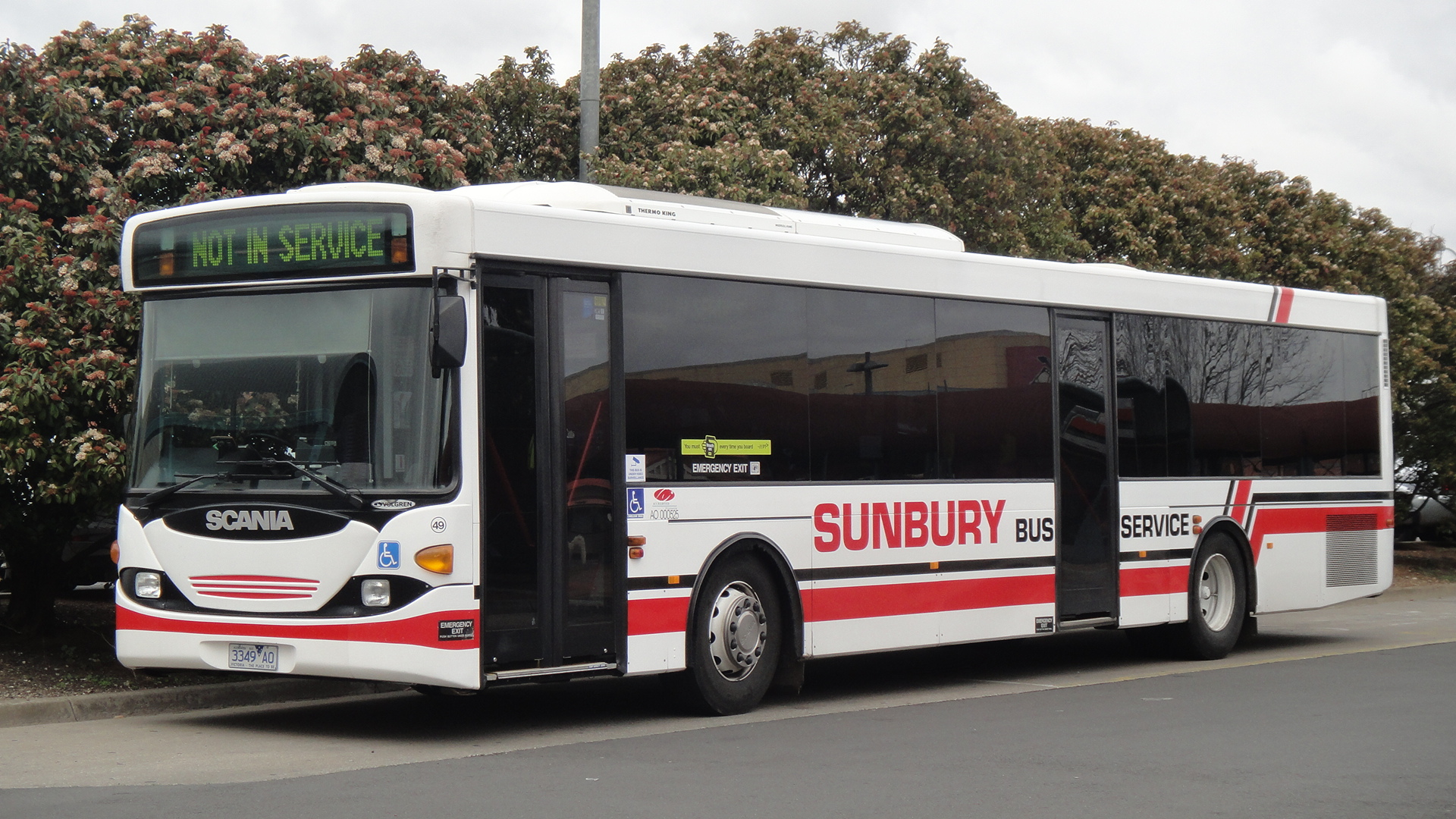
Volgren bodied Scania L94UB with the older operator livery

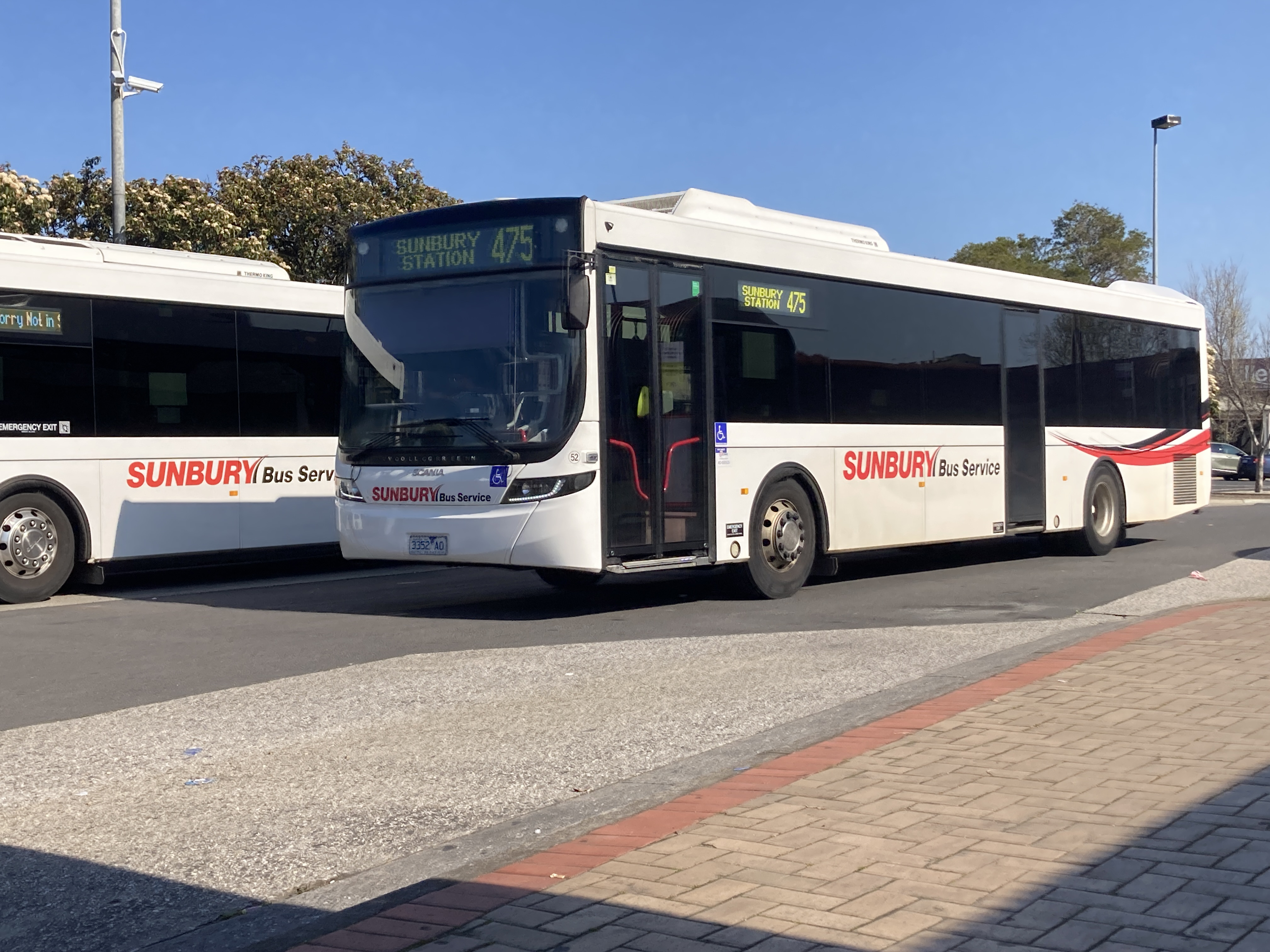
Volgren bodied Scania K310UB with the newer operator livery

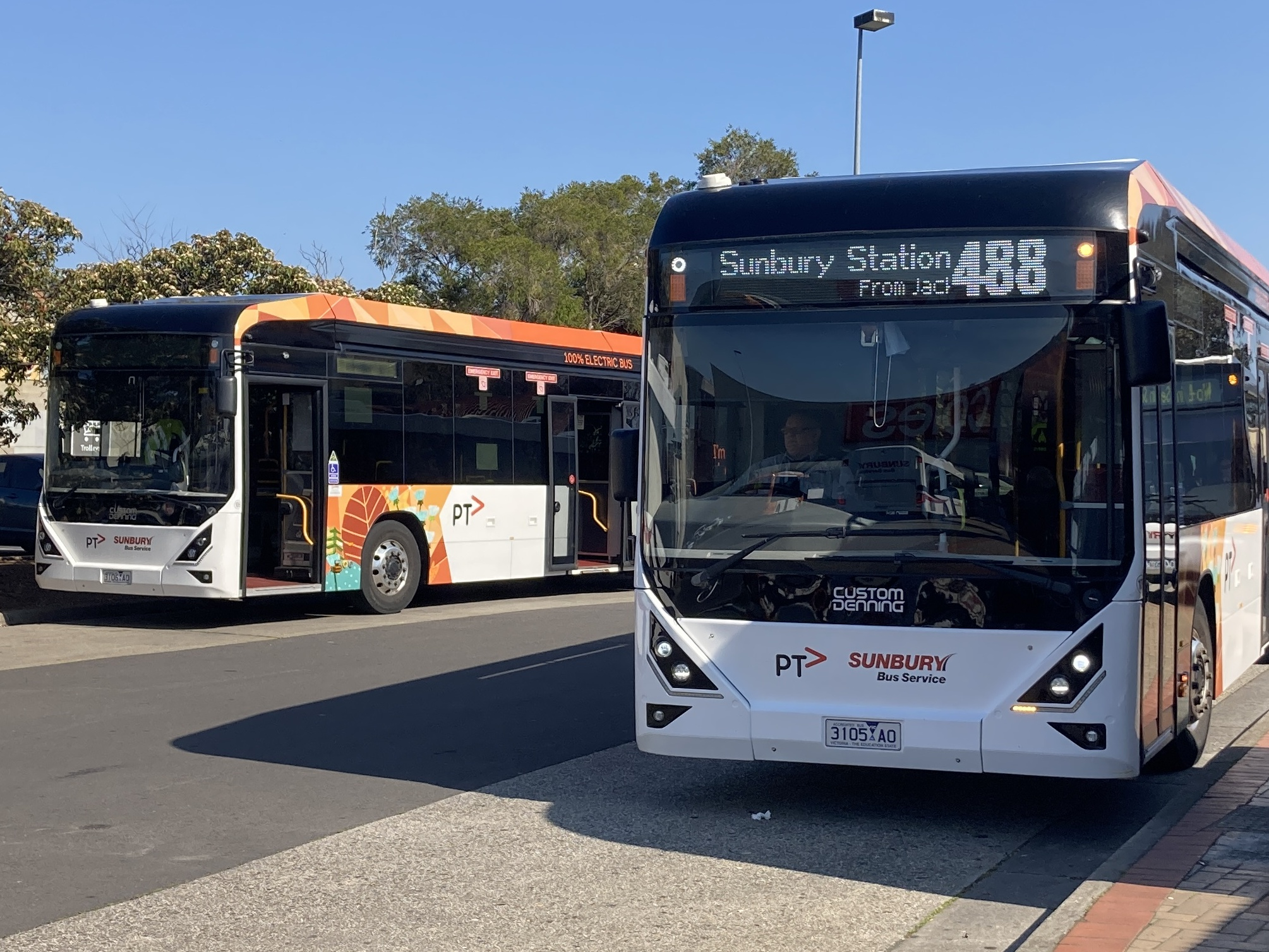
Two Custom Denning Elements with the current PTV livery
