= Maurie Sankey =

Australian rules footballer

Personal information
- Full name: Maurice Graham Sankey
- Born: 9 February 1940; Tasmania
- Died: 21 November 1965 (aged 25); Wangaratta, Victoria
- Original team: Latrobe
- Height: 193 cm (6 ft 4 in)
- Weight: 87 kg (192 lb)
- Position: Ruckman

Playing career^{1}
Years	Club	Games (Goals)
1959–1965	Carlton	100 (61)
- ^{1} Playing statistics correct to the end of 1965.

Maurice Graham Sankey (9 February 1940 – 21 November 1965) was an Australian rules footballer who played with Carlton in the Victorian Football League (VFL).

Sankey was from Tasmania and played his early football at Latrobe. A ruckman, he participated in Carlton's 1959 preliminary final loss to Essendon in just his third VFL appearance. He would later, in 1962, get to play in a grand final but again it was in a losing team, with Essendon victors.

He became club vice-captain in 1964 and brought up his 100th league match the following season.

On 21 November 1965, Sankey was killed when his car was involved in a head-on collision near Wangaratta. He is interred at Springvale Cemetery.

Maurice Sankey was posthumously inducted into the Tasmanian Football Hall of Fame on 23 June 2018.
