= Bob Crowe =

Bob Crowe may refer to:

- Bob Crow (1961–2014), British trade union leader
- Bob Crowe (footballer) (1936–2026), Australian rules footballer

== See also ==
- Robert Crowe (disambiguation)
