= Syd Carman =

Australian rules footballer

Personal information
- Full name: Sydney Maxwell Carman
- Born: 15 December 1901; Chewton, Victoria
- Died: 16 February 1966 (aged 64); Pascoe Vale South, Victoria
- Original team: Middle Park
- Height: 173 cm (5 ft 8 in)
- Weight: 65 kg (143 lb)

Playing career^{1}
Years	Club	Games (Goals)
1926–1933	Essendon	96 (8)
- ^{1} Playing statistics correct to the end of 1933.

Sydney Maxwell Carman (15 December 1901 – 16 February 1966) was an Australian rules footballer who played with Essendon in the Victorian Football League (VFL).

A centreman, Carman was the Essendon Best and Fairest winner in 1932 and also achieved Victorian interstate selection. After retiring as a player, he became club treasurer.
