= Trans North Bus & Coach =

Australian bus company

- Parent: Donric Group
- Commenced operation: 1983
- Headquarters: Innisfail
- Service area: North Queensland
- Service type: Bus operator
- Depots: 9
- Fleet: 119 (December 2023)
- Website: www.transnorthbus.com.au

Trans North Bus & Coach is an Australian bus company operating services in North Queensland

== History ==
Trans North Bus & Coach was founded in 1983 as one school bus run from Forrest Beach to Ingham. It expanded with the acquisition of the Forrest Bus Service and Panorama Coaches, Innisfail. Further acquisitions were made including Mission Beach Bus Service in 2003.

In June 2010, Trans North Bus & Coach was purchased by the Donric Group. It operates long-distance services from Cairns to Cooktown and Karumba.

== Fleet ==
As at December 2023, the fleet consisted of 119 buses and coaches.
