= Hugh Torney (footballer) =

Australian rules footballer, born 1909

Personal information
- Full name: Hugh Jacob Torney
- Born: 14 November 1909
- Died: 10 February 2000 (aged 90)
- Original team: Patchewollock
- Debut: 1933, Essendon vs. Carlton, at Windy Hill
- Height: 191 cm (6 ft 3 in)
- Weight: 92 kg (203 lb)

Playing career^{1}
Years	Club	Games (Goals)
1933–1943	Essendon	173 (81)
- ^{1} Playing statistics correct to the end of 1943.

Hugh Jacob Torney (14 November 1909 – 10 February 2000) was an Australian rules footballer who played with Essendon in the Victorian Football League (VFL), and with Williamstown in the Victorian Football Association (VFA).

== Family ==
The son of John Torney and Catherine Torney, née Brown, Torney was born on 14 November 1909.

He married Joyce Eudora Davis (1916-2005) in 1941; they had three daughters, Pamela, Lorraine, and Beverley.

== Football ==
=== South Melbourne (VFL) ===
Along with two of his Patchewollock team-mates, H. "Bub" Jamieson, and Reg Bryans, Torney tried out with South Melbourne in the 1933 pre-season. None of the three made South Melbourne's final list.

=== Essendon (VFL) ===
A ruckman, Torney kicked with his left foot and formed a lethal combination during his career with rover Dick Reynolds.

He had his finest season in 1940, winning the Essendon Best and Fairest award and finishing second in the Brownlow Medal count. His 24 Brownlow votes were at the time the most ever by a player not to win the medal. Torney was a premiership player in 1942 and also represented Victoria in 1937, 1939, and 1941.

He retired at the end of the 1943 season.

=== Willamstown (VFA) ===
He came out of retirement in 1945, and played one season with the VFA team Williamstown. He played 18 games and kicked 2 goals.
