= Robert Crowe =

Robert Crowe may refer to:

- Robert Crowe (cyclist) (born 1968), Australian cyclist
- Robert Crowe (singer), American sopranist
- Robert E. Crowe (1879–1958), Chicago lawyer and politician
- Robert Crowe (MP) for Philipstown (Parliament of Ireland constituency)
- Bob Crowe (1936–2026), Australian rules footballer

== See also ==
- Robert Crow (disambiguation)
