= Bob Crowe =

Australian rules footballer (1936–2026)

Personal information
- Full name: Robert Bromley Crowe
- Born: 22 May 1936
- Died: 26 August 2026 (aged 90)
- Original team: Mentone
- Height: 185 cm (6 ft 1 in)
- Weight: 72 kg (159 lb)

Playing career
| Years | Club | Games (Goals) |
| 1954–1964 | Carlton | 128 (62) |

Robert Bromley Crowe (22 May 1936 – 26 August 2026) was an Australian rules footballer who played with Carlton in the Victorian Football League (VFL).

Crowe started his career as a half forward flanker and kicked a goal with his first kick in league football. He managed 16 goals from just seven games in 1956, including a six-goal haul against Richmond, kicked another 21 goals in 1957 and then 16 in 1958. From 1959 however he was used as a half back and was at his best during the early 1960s.

A Mentone player, Crowe missed the second half of the 1959 season after suffering a pre-match injury. He had slipped in the player's race, while running onto the field for Carlton's game against Fitzroy at Brunswick Street. Despite an injury to his knee, Crowe played in the first quarter but the umpires allowed him to be substituted. He returned later in the year to play in Carlton's preliminary final loss to Essendon.

Crowe was a member of the Carlton team which were defeated in the 1962 VFL Grand Final.

He played for Dandenong in the Victorian Football Association, after leaving Carlton.

Crowe died on 26 August 2026 at the age of 90.
