= Jack Clarke (footballer, born 1933) =

Australian rules footballer (1933–2001)

- Jack Clarke after the 1962 VFL Grand Final

Personal information
- Full name: John Edward Clarke
- Born: 14 July 1933
- Died: 3 December 2001 (aged 68); Melbourne, Victoria
- Original team: Essendon High School
- Height: 175 cm (5 ft 9 in)
- Weight: 78 kg (172 lb)

Playing career^{1}
Years	Club	Games (Goals)
1951–1967	Essendon	263 (180)

Coaching career^{3}
Years	Club	Games (W–L–D)
1968–1970	Essendon	65 (33–30–2)
- ^{1} Playing statistics correct to the end of 1967.^{3} Coaching statistics correct as of 1970.

Career highlights
- Essendon premiership captain 1962; Essendon premiership player 1965; All-Australian team 1953, 1956, 1958; Essendon captain 1958–1964; W. S. Crichton Medal 1958, 1962

John Edward Clarke (14 July 1933 – 3 December 2001) was an Australian rules footballer and coach in the VFL. An Essendon and Victorian champion, Clarke was one of the premier midfielders of the VFL for well over a decade, Clarke led Essendon to the flag in 1962 as captain, and also played in the victorious 1965 side. Clarke was inducted into the Australian Football Hall of Fame in 1996, and was named as the centreman of the Essendon Team of the Century in 1997.

== Early life ==
John Edward Clarke was born on 14 July 1933 in Melbourne. He was the son of Tom Clarke, the curator at the Essendon Cricket Ground (Windy Hill) and a former Essendon and Brunswick footballer; additionally, he was the older brother of the well-known distance runner Ron Clarke.

== Architect ==
Clarke was a noted architect, who studied during the early stages of his VFL career.

== Football ==
Clarke was a talented centreman who debuted on his eighteenth birthday in 1951 and played 263 games for the Essendon Football Club from 1951 to 1967, kicking 180 goals. At the time of his retirement he was third in the all-time ranks of both games played (263) and games captained (121) at Essendon, on both occasions being bested by his mid-field predecessors, Bill Hutchison and Dick Reynolds, under whose guidance he had played his entire career.

Clarke played in strong Essendon teams that featured legends such as Hutchison, John Coleman, John Birt, Barry Davis, Hugh Mitchell and Ken Fraser, but Clarke was never overlooked by opposition coaches and regularly polled well in the Essendon Best and Fairest award, winning the award in 1958 and 1962. Clarke was not as successful in the Brownlow Medal, with best finishes of equal 6th in 1958, and equal 7th in 1953 at the age of 20.

Clarke captained the club from 1958 to 1964, winning one premiership and winning two Best and Fairest awards while in the role. In Round 17, 1958, Clarke was the second of only three captains in league history to have called for a headcount; however, the teams were even.

== Coach ==
He took over from John Coleman as Essendon coach in 1968, taking the team to the Grand Final, which they narrowly lost to Carlton. He was replaced as coach at the end of the 1970 season when Essendon finished 11th (of 12).

== Hall of Fame ==
He was inducted into the Australian Football Hall of Fame in 1996.

== Champions of Essendon ==
In 2002 an Essendon panel ranked him at 8 in their Champions of Essendon: a list of the 25 greatest players ever to have played for Essendon.
