= Robin Close =

Australian rules footballer

Personal information
- Born: 3 November 1949 (age 77); Ringwood, Victoria
- Original team: Ringwood
- Height: 187 cm (6 ft 2 in)
- Weight: 81 kg (179 lb)

Playing career^{1}
| Years | Club | Games (Goals) |
| 1968–1978 | Essendon | 147 (233) |
- ^{1} Playing statistics correct to the end of 1978.

Robin Close (born 3 November 1949) is a former Australian rules footballer who played for Essendon in the VFL during the late 1960s and 1970s.

A forward, Close could play the key positions but was used mainly as a half forward flanker. He debuted in 1968 and played in Essendon's 1968 VFL Grand Final side that year.

His best seasons in front of goal were 1969 when he kicked 39, 1973 with 38 and 1975 with 36. His career stalled in 1974 when he had a leg injury but he returned the following year. He retired in 1978 having played 147 games and kicked 233 goals.

After departing the league scene he played country football in the Ovens and Murray Football League initially with Myrtleford and then with Benalla. Close went on to coach Benalla in 1981 and 1982.
