= Andy Wilson (Australian rules footballer) =

Australian footballer

Personal information
- Born: 25 September 1951 (age 75)
- Original team: Warracknabeal (Wimmera FL)
- Height: 179 cm (5 ft 10 in)
- Weight: 70 kg (154 lb)

Playing career^{1}
Years	Club	Games (Goals)
1971–1977	Essendon	112 (129)
- ^{1} Playing statistics correct to the end of 1977.

Andy Wilson (born 25 September 1951) is a former Australian rules footballer who played with Essendon in the VFL during the 1970s.

A rover, Wilson had his best season in 1973 when he kicked 40 goals and won the W. S. Crichton Medal as Essendon's best and fairest player.
