= Jeff Gamble =

Australian rules footballer

Personal information
- Full name: Jeff M. Gamble
- Born: 24 May 1935
- Died: 20 June 1996 (aged 61)
- Original team: Aberfeldie
- Height: 191 cm (6 ft 3 in)
- Weight: 80 kg (176 lb)

Playing career^{1}
Years	Club	Games (Goals)
1953–1960	Essendon	90 (14)
- ^{1} Playing statistics correct to the end of 1960.

Jeff Gamble (24 May 1935 – 20 June 1996) was an Australian rules footballer who played with Essendon in the Victorian Football League (VFL).

Gamble, recruited from local club Aberfeldie, was a key defender for Essendon, after starting out as a follower.

He had his best season in 1958 when he finished equal sixth in the Brownlow Medal count and was second in the Essendon Best and Fairest.

Gamble was Essendon's centre half-back in their 1957 VFL Grand Final loss to Melbourne.

During the 1959 season he suffered a knee injury and had to have cartilage removed. He managed to play ten games in 1960 but he was then forced to retire due to the injury.

Gamble was the uncle of actress Cate Blanchett through his sister, June and also provided the inspiration to Kevin Andrews, who composed the Essendon club song on the kitchen table of his parents, Horace and Rosalie Jean Gamble.
