= Beisel =

Beisel is a surname. Notable people with the name include:

- Christian Beisel (born 1982), German football player
- Elizabeth Beisel (born 1992), American competition swimmer
- Monty Beisel (born 1978), American football player
- Rex Beisel (1893–1972), American aeronautical engineer and pioneer in the science and industry of aviation

== See also ==
- Beisel-Mitchell House, a historic house in Paragould, Arkansas
- Beisel, a defunct American automobile manufacturer
- Beissel
