= Robert Crow =

Robert Crow is the name of:

- Bob Crow (1961–2014), British trade unionist
- Rob Crow (born 1971), American musician
- Robert Crow (actor) in Space: Above and Beyond
- Robert Crow (WI), in United States House of Representatives elections in Ohio, 2008

== See also ==
- Robert Crowe (disambiguation)
