= Paul Doran =

Australian rules footballer (born 1939)

Personal information
- Born: 22 November 1939 (age 86)
- Original team: St. Bernard's College
- Height: 187 cm (6 ft 2 in)
- Weight: 76 kg (168 lb)

Playing career^{1}
Years	Club	Games (Goals)
1959–1965	Essendon	82 (34)
- ^{1} Playing statistics correct to the end of 1965.

Career highlights
- VFL Premiership player: (1962)

Paul Doran (born 22 November 1939) is an Australian rules footballer who played with Essendon in the Victorian Football League (VFL).

Originally from St. Bernard's College, Doran joined Essendon in 1959 and was a fullback in their 1962 premiership side. He retired in 1965 after 82 games for Essendon.
