= Tom Clarke (Australian footballer) =

Australian rules footballer

Personal information
- Born: 21 November 1906
- Died: 24 July 1981 (aged 74)
- Original team: Williamstown Juniors
- Position: Wing

Playing career
Years	Club	Games (Goals)
1927–1934	Essendon	103 (3)

Thomas Clarke (21 November 1906 – 24 July 1981) was an Australian rules footballer who played 103 games for Essendon in the Victorian Football League (VFL) from 1927 to 1934, and 105 games for Brunswick in the Victorian Football Association (VFA) from 1935 to 1940.

"A fine wingman whose only significant weakness was a slight lack of leg speed, a deficiency he helped overcome with excellent anticipation and smooth ball handling", Tom Clarke won Essendon's best and fairest in 1931. He finished his career in the VFA with Brunswick. He was the ground curator at the Essendon Cricket Ground (Windy Hill), an Essendon Football Club Committee member from 1944 to 1961, and its Vice-President from 1962 to 1973.

His older son, Jack Clarke, an architect, who played 263 games with Essendon, was also captain of Essendon from 1958 to 1964, and its coach from 1967 to 1970. His younger son, Ron Clarke, a champion athlete (who set seventeen world records), went on to win medals at the 1964 (Tokyo) Olympics, and at the Commonwealth Games in 1962 (Perth), 1966 (Kingston), and 1970 (Edinburgh).
