= Graeme Johnston =

Australian rules footballer

Personal information
- Born: 20 May 1942
- Original team: Wesley College
- Height: 178 cm (5 ft 10 in)
- Weight: 71 kg (157 lb)

Playing career^{1}
Years	Club	Games (Goals)
1962–1967	Essendon	71 (34)
- ^{1} Playing statistics correct to the end of 1967.

Graeme Johnston (born 20 May 1942) is a former Australian rules footballer who played for Essendon in the VFL during the 1960s.

A half forward flanker, Johnston first played with Essendon in the 1962 season and finished the year in a premiership side. He was a premiership player again in 1965 and by the time he retired in 1967 had amassed a total of 71 VFL games.
