= Ken Timms =

Australian rules footballer (1938–2023)

Personal information
- Full name: Kenneth George Timms
- Born: 23 July 1938
- Died: 4 November 2023 (aged 85); Melbourne, Victoria, Australia
- Original team: North Essendon Methodists
- Height: 188 cm (6 ft 2 in)
- Weight: 79 kg (174 lb)

Playing career^{1}
Years	Club	Games (Goals)
1957–1965	Essendon	134 (112)
- ^{1} Playing statistics correct to the end of 1965.

Kenneth George Timms (23 July 1938 – 4 November 2023) was an Australian rules footballer who played for Essendon in the VFL.

A forward pocket in Essendon's 1962 premiership side, Timms played a total of nine seasons with Essendon and kicked 31 goals in 1963.

Ken Timms died on 4 November 2023, at the age of 85.
