= Bill Bennett (footballer) =

Australian rules footballer

Personal information
- Born: 12 April 1948 (age 78)
- Original team: Maffra (LVFL)
- Debut: Round 2, 1966, Carlton vs. St Kilda, at Moorabbin Oval
- Height: 185 cm (6 ft 1 in)
- Weight: 80 kg (176 lb)

Playing career^{1}
Years	Club	Games (Goals)
1966–1968	Carlton	11 (9)
- ^{1} Playing statistics correct to the end of 1968.

William Bennett (born 12 April 1948) is a former Australian rules footballer who played for Carlton in the VFL during the 1960s.

A forward from the Victorian town of Maffra, Bennett played 11 games in an injury-plagued career with Carlton which included the 1968 VFL Grand Final. Lining up at centre half-forward, Bennett's side finished victors by three points in what would be his last league game.

Bennett was recruited by South Australian National Football League (SANFL) club South Adelaide in 1972 and came third in the 1972 and 1973 Magarey Medal. Following the end of his SANFL career, Bennett moved to Darwin to play for St Mary's Football Club where he won the 1977/78 Nichols Medal for Best and Fairest in the Northern Territory Football League (NTFL).
