= Neil Evans (presenter) =

Australian soccer commentator

Neil Evans is an Australian former football (soccer) commentator appearing on the Australian Fox Sports network. With Robbie Slater, he hosted the program Total Football, which focuses on Australian soccer including the Socceroos and the A-League.

Evans no longer presented for FOX Sports after Simon Hill was brought over from SBS Australia. Hill is now the regular Total Football presenter and has also taken over Evans's role as a match day commentator for the A-League.

Evans was media chief for Centrebet, an Australian bookmaker, and is also a popular after-dinner speaker. His nickname is "Wood Duck". He has become a political analyst in the eyes of The Sydney Morning Herald.
