= Beissel von Gymnich =

German aristocratic family

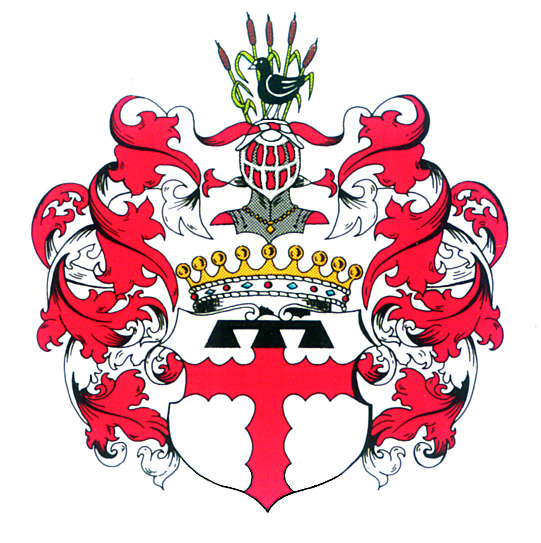
Beissel v. Gymnich Coat of Arms

The Beissel von Gymnich is the name of an old German aristocratic family, originally from the Lower Rhine, near Cologne. They are still extant and are one of the oldest surviving families of the Uradel, or ancient German nobility.

== History ==
The Gymnich family first appears in 1139 with Azelin von Gymnich, a ministerial of the Electorate of Cologne. In 1344, the family split into an elder and junior line. Wilhelm Beissel von Gymnich, of the junior line, was the first to bear the name Beissel, but it is unclear where this name came from. On 17 January 1816, Baron Franz Ludwig Beissel von Gymnich was raised to a Prussian counthood. His son, Count Hugo, was a member of the Prussian House of Lords, as was his grandson, Count Otto. They were representatives of the Rhineland counts.

== Estates ==
Photos and details of many of their estates are available at the corresponding German wikipedia page.

== Heraldry ==
Argent a cross engrailed Gules, in chief a label Sable. Crest: a hat of tournament Gules, turned up Argent, supporting a quill Proper in the middle of a tuft of reeds. Lambrequins: Gules and Sable.
