= Peter Falconer (footballer) =

Australian rules footballer

Personal information
- Full name: Peter Falconer
- Born: 28 November 1937
- Original team: Geelong Amateurs
- Height: 169 cm (5 ft 7 in)
- Weight: 61 kg (134 lb)
- Position: Rover

Playing career^{1}
Years	Club	Games (Goals)
1958, 1960	Geelong	20 (16)
1962–63	Carlton	24 (33)
Total		44 (49)
- ^{1} Playing statistics correct to the end of 1963.

Peter Falconer (born 28 November 1937) is a former Australian rules footballer who played for Geelong and Carlton in the Victorian Football League (VFL).

Falconer was a Geelong Amateur before making his senior VFL debut in 1958, replacing club vice-captain Neil Trezise. He had a strong first season and despite missing four games, was Geelong's leading vote getter at the Brownlow Medal. A rover, Falconer was one of the smallest players of his era and also had a good debut season at Carlton. His 30 goals was the second most by a Carlton player that year and he again polled well on Brownlow Medal night, sharing the equal most Carlton votes with Bruce McMaster-Smith. He also appeared in all 20 games that year, including the 1962 VFL Grand Final loss.
