= Graeme Anderson (footballer, born 1939) =

Australian rules footballer (1939–2022)

Personal information
- Full name: Graeme Francis Anderson
- Born: 6 April 1939
- Died: 7 November 2022 (aged 83); Mornington, Victoria, Australia
- Original team: Watchem-Corack
- Height: 185 cm (6 ft 1 in)
- Weight: 78 kg (172 lb)

Playing career^{1}
Years	Club	Games (Goals)
1961–1968	Carlton	79 (0)
- ^{1} Playing statistics correct to the end of 1968.

Graeme Francis Anderson (6 April 1939 – 7 November 2022) was an Australian rules footballer who played with Carlton in the Victorian Football League (VFL) during the 1960s.

Anderson was the son of Carlton premiership winning player Frank Anderson. Like his father, Anderson played as a defender, mostly on the half back flanks or at full-back.

Anderson helped Carlton reach the 1962 VFL Grand Final by taking two important marks late in the preliminary final, which they won by just five points. In the Grand Final he played as a half back flanker and finished on the losing team.

After playing eight games in the 1968 home and away season, Anderson finished the year in the reserves and missed out on a Carlton premiership, secured with a grand final win over Essendon.
