= Ken Fraser =

Australian rules footballer (born 1940)

Personal information
- Full name: Ken Fraser
- Born: 17 February 1940 (age 86)
- Height: 187 cm (6 ft 2 in)
- Weight: 80 kg (176 lb)

Playing career
Years	Club	Games (Goals)
1958–1968	Essendon	198 (157)

Representative team honours
Years	Team	Games (Goals)
	Victoria	9 (20)

Career highlights
- Essendon premiership player 1962; Essendon premiership captain 1965; Essendon Team of the Century; W. S. Crichton Medal 1963, 1964; Essendon captain 1965–1968; Australian Football Hall of Fame, inducted 2001

Ken Fraser (born 17 February 1940) is a former Australian rules footballer who played in the Victorian Football League (VFL).

Originally recruited from the Essendon Baptists St John's club (which later merged with Ascot Vale Presbyterians to become the Tullamarine Football Club) in the Essendon District Football League, Fraser mainly played at centre half-forward. He won the Essendon Football Club's Best First-Year Player award in 1958 and went on to play in two premiership teams, with his second premiership as captain. He also won two club best-and-fairest awards and represented Victoria on many occasions. In 2001, Fraser was inducted into the Australian Football Hall of Fame. In 2002, he was ranked 7th in the Champions of Essendon list.

In addition to his football career, Fraser also served as Principal of Templestowe Secondary College in Lower Templestowe, Victoria, Australia, for many years. His son, Mark, also played for Essendon.
