= Graham Donaldson =

Australian rules footballer and coach

Personal information
- Born: 20 June 1935
- Died: 31 August 2001 (aged 66)
- Original team: East Ballarat
- Debut: Round 4, 1955, Carlton vs. St. Kilda, at Junction Oval
- Height: 192 cm (6 ft 4 in)
- Weight: 93 kg (205 lb)

Playing career^{1}
Years	Club	Games (Goals)
1955–1962	Carlton	106 (85)

Coaching career
Years	Club	Games (W–L–D)
1971–1974	Fitzroy	85 (34–50–1)
- ^{1} Playing statistics correct to the end of 1962.

Graham Donaldson (20 June 1935 – 31 August 2001) was an Australian rules footballer in the Victorian Football League.

Donaldson made his debut for the Carlton Football Club in the Round 4 of the 1955 season. He announced his retirement from the game after the 1962 season.
