= Graeme Beissel =

Australian rules footballer

Personal information
- Born: 25 August 1941
- Original team: University High
- Height: 183 cm (6 ft 0 in)
- Weight: 80 kg (176 lb)

Playing career^{1}
Years	Club	Games (Goals)
1961–1964	Essendon	36 (17)
- ^{1} Playing statistics correct to the end of 1964.

Graeme Beissel (born 25 August 1941) is a former Australian rules footballer who played with Essendon in the VFL during the 1960s.

Beissel made his debut for Essendon in 1961 and played as a centreman in Essendon's 32 point 1962 Grand Final victory over Carlton.
