= Geoff Pryor (footballer) =

Australian rules footballer

Personal information
- Born: 21 November 1945 (age 80)
- Original team: Wesley College
- Height: 191 cm (6 ft 3 in)
- Weight: 86 kg (190 lb)

Playing career^{1}
Years	Club	Games (Goals)
1965–70, 1973–74	Essendon	137 (8)
- ^{1} Playing statistics correct to the end of 1974.

Geoff Pryor (born 21 November 1945) is a former Australian rules footballer who played with Essendon in the VFL during the late 1960s and early 1970s.

Pryor was a tall defender who played at half back in Essendon's 1965 premiership team and was at full-back in the side that lost the 1968 Grand Final. He was one of the Essendon footballers who took part in the 1970 player's strike which saw him miss the opening round and later helped form the league's Players Association.

He missed the 1971 and 1972 seasons as he was overseas but returned in 1973 to bring up his 100th VFL game and remained until the end of the 1974 season.
