= Neil Evans (footballer) =

Australian rules footballer

Personal information
- Full name: Neil R. Evans
- Born: 6 February 1947 (age 79)
- Original team: University High School Old Boys
- Height: 191 cm (6 ft 3 in)
- Weight: 92 kg (203 lb)
- Position: Ruckman

Playing career^{1}
Years	Club	Games (Goals)
1967–1968	Essendon	12 (7)
1969	West Perth	13 (0)
1972–1973	Sandringham	16 (10)
Total		41 (17)
- ^{1} Playing statistics correct to the end of 1973.

Neil Evans (born 6 February 1947) is a former Australian rules footballer who played with Essendon in the Victorian Football League (VFL).

Evans, who spent his early football years with both Essendon Baptists St John's juniors and University High School Old Boys, played his football as a ruckman. After playing 10 games with Essendon in 1967, Evans was kept out of the side for most of the 1968 season with a hamstring injury. His first game of the year was a preliminary final and a week later he appeared in the 1968 VFL Grand Final, which Essendon lost to Carlton by just three points.

After coming close in 1968, Evans was a member of a premiership team in 1969, with West Perth in the West Australian National Football League. It was his only season at West Perth, a club that his elder brother and future AFL chairman Ron Evans played for earlier in the decade. He finished his career with two seasons at Sandringham in the Victorian Football Association.
