= Darryl Gerlach =

Australian rules footballer

Personal information
- Born: 25 January 1944 (age 82)
- Original team: Strathmore (EDFL)
- Height: 180 cm (5 ft 11 in)
- Weight: 78 kg (172 lb)

Playing career^{1}
| Years | Club | Games (Goals) |
| 1963–1972 | Essendon | 168 (6) |
- ^{1} Playing statistics correct to the end of 1972.

Darryl Gerlach (born 25 January 1944) is a former Australian rules footballer who played for Essendon in the VFL.

Gerlach played his football in the back pocket for Essendon although he started his career in the centre. He was a premiership player with Essendon in 1965 and won their best and fairest award in 1970. He also represented Victoria at interstate football during the late 1960s.
