= Russell Blew =

Australian rules footballer

Personal information
- Born: November 7, 1941 (age 84)
- Original team: Ascot Youth Centre
- Height: 178 cm (5 ft 10 in)
- Weight: 71 kg (157 lb)

Playing career^{1}
Years	Club	Games (Goals)
1960–1968	Essendon	125 (16)
- ^{1} Playing statistics correct to the end of 1968.

Russell Blew (born 7 November 1941) is a former Australian rules footballer who played with Essendon in the VFL during the 1960s.

A pacy wingman, Blew debuted for Essendon in 1960. In 1964 he finished second in the best and fairest awards and represented Victoria at interstate football. He was a premiership player with Essendon in 1962 and 1965.
