= Wes Lofts =

Australian rules footballer

Personal information
- Full name: Wesley Victor Lofts
- Born: 15 November 1942
- Died: 22 May 2014 (aged 71)
- Original team: West Coburg
- Debut: Round 6, 1960, Carlton vs. Geelong, at Kardinia Park
- Height: 188 cm (6 ft 2 in)
- Weight: 89 kg (196 lb)

Playing career^{1}
Years	Club	Games (Goals)
1960–1970	Carlton	167 (65)
- ^{1} Playing statistics correct to the end of 1970.

Wesley Victor Lofts (15 November 1942 – 22 May 2014) was an Australian rules footballer who played for Carlton in the Victorian Football League (VFL) during the 1960s.

A key defender, Lofts represented the Victorian interstate team in both 1963 and 1967. He was a premiership player with Carlton in 1968 and missed out on a second premiership in 1970 when he was dropped for the finals series.

Following his retirement, he remained involved with Carlton in an administrative capacity, and in 1998 was inducted into the Carlton Hall of Fame.

Wes Lofts died on 22 May 2014 after a long battle with emphysema, aged 71.
