= John Birt (footballer) =

Australian rules footballer and coach

Personal information
- Born: 29 January 1937 (age 89)
- Original teams: Ballarat, Victoria
- Height: 174 cm (5 ft 9 in)
- Weight: 69 kg (152 lb)

Playing career^{1}
Years	Club	Games (Goals)
1957–1967	Essendon	193 (303)

Coaching career
Years	Club	Games (W–L–D)
1971	Essendon	22 (4–17–1)
- ^{1} Playing statistics correct to the end of 1967.

Career highlights
- Victorian interstate representative – 11 games; "The Galahs" representative – 1968 Australian Football World Tour

John Birt (born 29 January 1937) is a former Australian rules footballer who played with Essendon in the VFL and West Torrens in the South Australian National Football League (SANFL).

Birt was a rover and, after being recruited to Essendon from Ballarat, he made his VFL debut in 1957. The following year he had one of his finest seasons, finishing 6th in the Brownlow Medal and topping Essendon's goalkicking list with 31 goals. He was a premiership player in 1962 and 1965, as well as playing in two losing Grand Finals, and won the W. S. Crichton Medal for his club's Best and Fairest in 1961, 1965 and 1967.

Birt was playing coach for West Torrens in the SANFL from 1968 to 1970.

He returned to Victoria to coach Essendon in 1971.

However, Essendon only won four games in the 1971 season. In 1972, he was replaced by Des Tuddenham.

Footscray then picked him up and he served as their assistant coach between 1972 and 1976.

In 2002, an Essendon panel selected Birt as number twenty-one of the 25 Champions of Essendon.
