= 1968 VFL season =

72nd season of the Victorian Football League (VFL)

1968 VFL premiership season
- Teams: 12
- Premiers: Carlton; 9th premiership
- Minor premiers: Essendon; 10th minor premiership
- Consolation series: Hawthorn; 1st Consolation series win
- Brownlow Medallist: Bob Skilton (South Melbourne)
- Coleman Medallist: Peter Hudson (Hawthorn)
- Matches played: 124
- Highest: 116,828

The 1968 VFL season was the 72nd season of the Victorian Football League (VFL), the highest level senior Australian rules football competition in Victoria. The season featured twelve clubs, ran from 15 April until 28 September, and comprised a 20-game home-and-away season followed by a finals series featuring the top four clubs.

The premiership was won by the Carlton Football Club for the ninth time, after it defeated Essendon by three points in the 1968 VFL Grand Final.

== Background ==
In 1968, the VFL competition consisted of twelve teams of 18 on-the-field players each, plus two substitute players, known as the 19th man and the 20th man. A player could be substituted for any reason; however, once substituted, a player could not return to the field of play under any circumstances.

Teams played each other in a home-and-away season of 20 rounds; matches 12 to 20 were the "home-and-way reverse" of matches 1 to 9.

Once the 20 round home-and-away season had finished, the 1968 VFL Premiers were determined by the specific format and conventions of the Page–McIntyre system.

== Home-and-away season ==
=== Round 1 ===
Home team	Home team score	Away team	Away team score	Venue	Crowd	Date
Footscray	9.18 (72)	North Melbourne	13.10 (88)	Western Oval	18,269	15 April 1968
Essendon	26.16 (172)	Hawthorn	15.9 (99)	Windy Hill	17,000	15 April 1968
Collingwood	10.12 (72)	Richmond	11.22 (88)	Victoria Park	37,018	15 April 1968
Carlton	13.22 (100)	Geelong	7.12 (54)	Princes Park	30,158	15 April 1968
South Melbourne	18.17 (125)	St Kilda	13.22 (100)	Lake Oval	23,675	15 April 1968
Melbourne	14.10 (94)	Fitzroy	12.18 (90)	MCG	24,991	15 April 1968

=== Round 2 ===
Home team	Home team score	Away team	Away team score	Venue	Crowd	Date
Hawthorn	17.24 (126)	South Melbourne	19.12 (126)	Glenferrie Oval	13,536	20 April 1968
St Kilda	16.22 (118)	Melbourne	9.8 (62)	Moorabbin Oval	21,758	20 April 1968
Geelong	9.17 (71)	Footscray	6.11 (47)	Kardinia Park	14,589	20 April 1968
North Melbourne	9.9 (63)	Essendon	10.22 (82)	Arden Street Oval	14,810	20 April 1968
Fitzroy	14.16 (100)	Collingwood	10.11 (71)	Princes Park	17,149	20 April 1968
Richmond	17.16 (118)	Carlton	10.12 (72)	MCG	51,889	20 April 1968

=== Round 3 ===
Home team	Home team score	Away team	Away team score	Venue	Crowd	Date
Carlton	1.11 (17)	Essendon	7.8 (50)	Princes Park	37,406	25 April 1968
Richmond	10.15 (75)	Geelong	17.21 (123)	MCG	52,175	25 April 1968
Footscray	14.10 (94)	Hawthorn	16.9 (105)	Western Oval	14,054	27 April 1968
Collingwood	2.19 (31)	St Kilda	10.7 (67)	Victoria Park	29,491	27 April 1968
South Melbourne	13.10 (88)	Melbourne	14.14 (98)	Lake Oval	17,260	27 April 1968
North Melbourne	15.17 (107)	Fitzroy	14.7 (91)	Arden Street Oval	13,122	27 April 1968

=== Round 4 ===
Home team	Home team score	Away team	Away team score	Venue	Crowd	Date
Melbourne	12.10 (82)	North Melbourne	12.4 (76)	MCG	19,498	4 May 1968
Fitzroy	13.19 (97)	Footscray	12.13 (85)	Princes Park	11,378	4 May 1968
Essendon	16.19 (115)	South Melbourne	10.15 (75)	Windy Hill	19,000	4 May 1968
St Kilda	12.12 (84)	Richmond	7.18 (60)	Moorabbin Oval	30,606	4 May 1968
Geelong	6.10 (46)	Collingwood	4.13 (37)	Kardinia Park	19,144	4 May 1968
Hawthorn	11.11 (77)	Carlton	15.10 (100)	Glenferrie Oval	17,606	4 May 1968

=== Round 5 ===
Home team	Home team score	Away team	Away team score	Venue	Crowd	Date
North Melbourne	6.13 (49)	St Kilda	9.7 (61)	Arden Street Oval	14,409	11 May 1968
Essendon	16.16 (112)	Fitzroy	11.15 (81)	Windy Hill	18,500	11 May 1968
Collingwood	17.11 (113)	Hawthorn	11.16 (82)	Victoria Park	20,688	11 May 1968
Carlton	16.15 (111)	Footscray	5.9 (39)	Princes Park	14,490	11 May 1968
South Melbourne	8.10 (58)	Richmond	13.25 (103)	Lake Oval	17,783	11 May 1968
Melbourne	9.9 (63)	Geelong	10.10 (70)	MCG	31,862	11 May 1968

=== Round 6 ===
Home team	Home team score	Away team	Away team score	Venue	Crowd	Date
Footscray	13.7 (85)	Melbourne	6.12 (48)	Western Oval	10,441	18 May 1968
Fitzroy	6.8 (44)	St Kilda	19.6 (120)	Princes Park	12,852	18 May 1968
Collingwood	13.14 (92)	Essendon	9.12 (66)	Victoria Park	28,302	18 May 1968
Richmond	14.17 (101)	North Melbourne	4.7 (31)	MCG	24,317	18 May 1968
Hawthorn	10.11 (71)	Geelong	12.10 (82)	Glenferrie Oval	10,100	18 May 1968
South Melbourne	10.11 (71)	Carlton	12.11 (83)	Lake Oval	13,420	18 May 1968

=== Round 7 ===
Home team	Home team score	Away team	Away team score	Venue	Crowd	Date
North Melbourne	7.15 (57)	South Melbourne	8.13 (61)	Arden Street Oval	7,730	25 May 1968
Essendon	11.14 (80)	Richmond	10.18 (78)	Windy Hill	22,980	25 May 1968
Carlton	15.11 (101)	Collingwood	9.13 (67)	Princes Park	26,045	25 May 1968
Melbourne	11.14 (80)	Hawthorn	11.10 (76)	MCG	17,263	25 May 1968
St Kilda	11.13 (79)	Footscray	4.11 (35)	Moorabbin Oval	16,056	25 May 1968
Geelong	11.21 (87)	Fitzroy	7.6 (48)	Kardinia Park	11,474	25 May 1968

=== Round 8 ===
Home team	Home team score	Away team	Away team score	Venue	Crowd	Date
Footscray	9.8 (62)	South Melbourne	11.9 (75)	Western Oval	14,755	8 June 1968
Collingwood	11.13 (79)	Melbourne	13.7 (85)	Victoria Park	24,375	8 June 1968
North Melbourne	9.11 (65)	Geelong	13.11 (89)	Arden Street Oval	13,209	8 June 1968
Richmond	11.15 (81)	Hawthorn	11.14 (80)	MCG	31,325	10 June 1968
St Kilda	16.17 (113)	Essendon	8.9 (57)	Moorabbin Oval	43,231	10 June 1968
Fitzroy	4.10 (34)	Carlton	13.15 (93)	Princes Park	19,306	10 June 1968

=== Round 9 ===
Home team	Home team score	Away team	Away team score	Venue	Crowd	Date
Melbourne	9.9 (63)	Richmond	17.17 (119)	MCG	39,609	15 June 1968
Geelong	15.9 (99)	St Kilda	11.9 (75)	Kardinia Park	29,404	15 June 1968
Essendon	11.17 (83)	Footscray	5.11 (41)	Windy Hill	14,000	15 June 1968
Carlton	20.11 (131)	North Melbourne	10.15 (75)	Princes Park	15,270	15 June 1968
Hawthorn	21.14 (140)	Fitzroy	16.14 (110)	Glenferrie Oval	11,039	15 June 1968
South Melbourne	19.10 (124)	Collingwood	15.9 (99)	Lake Oval	17,193	15 June 1968

=== Round 10 ===
Home team	Home team score	Away team	Away team score	Venue	Crowd	Date
Geelong	13.15 (93)	South Melbourne	8.15 (63)	Kardinia Park	17,794	22 June 1968
Fitzroy	12.12 (84)	Richmond	15.15 (105)	Princes Park	11,204	22 June 1968
North Melbourne	8.14 (62)	Hawthorn	15.16 (106)	Arden Street Oval	7,884	22 June 1968
Melbourne	9.14 (68)	Essendon	15.6 (96)	MCG	32,932	22 June 1968
Footscray	5.7 (37)	Collingwood	9.11 (65)	Western Oval	13,120	22 June 1968
St Kilda	3.10 (28)	Carlton	8.8 (56)	Moorabbin Oval	28,885	22 June 1968

=== Round 11 ===
Home team	Home team score	Away team	Away team score	Venue	Crowd	Date
Hawthorn	15.11 (101)	St Kilda	17.9 (111)	Glenferrie Oval	19,279	29 June 1968
Essendon	14.20 (104)	Geelong	12.9 (81)	Windy Hill	24,450	29 June 1968
Collingwood	13.16 (94)	North Melbourne	4.8 (32)	Victoria Park	14,814	29 June 1968
Carlton	11.19 (85)	Melbourne	6.7 (43)	Princes Park	15,234	29 June 1968
Richmond	17.20 (122)	Footscray	16.8 (104)	MCG	17,844	29 June 1968
South Melbourne	17.15 (117)	Fitzroy	13.12 (90)	Lake Oval	11,241	29 June 1968

=== Round 12 ===
Home team	Home team score	Away team	Away team score	Venue	Crowd	Date
St Kilda	15.19 (109)	South Melbourne	6.9 (45)	Moorabbin Oval	19,059	6 July 1968
Fitzroy	11.14 (80)	Melbourne	14.16 (100)	Princes Park	8,530	6 July 1968
North Melbourne	8.9 (57)	Footscray	9.18 (72)	Arden Street Oval	7,844	6 July 1968
Hawthorn	11.17 (83)	Essendon	17.10 (112)	Glenferrie Oval	12,480	6 July 1968
Richmond	17.12 (114)	Collingwood	17.15 (117)	MCG	43,165	6 July 1968
Geelong	8.7 (55)	Carlton	9.9 (63)	Kardinia Park	25,007	6 July 1968

=== Round 13 ===
Home team	Home team score	Away team	Away team score	Venue	Crowd	Date
Melbourne	10.11 (71)	St Kilda	10.16 (76)	MCG	30,581	13 July 1968
Footscray	18.18 (126)	Geelong	5.13 (43)	Western Oval	13,092	13 July 1968
Essendon	16.19 (115)	North Melbourne	9.9 (63)	Windy Hill	11,690	13 July 1968
Collingwood	18.14 (122)	Fitzroy	18.7 (115)	Victoria Park	16,357	13 July 1968
Carlton	11.14 (80)	Richmond	10.14 (74)	Princes Park	24,245	13 July 1968
South Melbourne	12.10 (82)	Hawthorn	15.11 (101)	Lake Oval	11,191	13 July 1968

=== Round 14 ===
Home team	Home team score	Away team	Away team score	Venue	Crowd	Date
Melbourne	10.10 (70)	South Melbourne	12.8 (80)	MCG	18,976	20 July 1968
Geelong	13.11 (89)	Richmond	9.16 (70)	Kardinia Park	23,932	20 July 1968
Fitzroy	13.17 (95)	North Melbourne	9.14 (68)	Princes Park	7,563	20 July 1968
Hawthorn	24.8 (152)	Footscray	10.10 (70)	Glenferrie Oval	13,810	20 July 1968
St Kilda	11.10 (76)	Collingwood	12.13 (85)	Moorabbin Oval	28,246	20 July 1968
Essendon	7.13 (55)	Carlton	6.13 (49)	Windy Hill	32,000	20 July 1968

=== Round 15 ===
Home team	Home team score	Away team	Away team score	Venue	Crowd	Date
Richmond	13.16 (94)	St Kilda	9.10 (64)	MCG	42,740	27 July 1968
Collingwood	4.12 (36)	Geelong	7.12 (54)	Victoria Park	25,849	27 July 1968
Carlton	9.14 (68)	Hawthorn	11.15 (81)	Princes Park	18,470	27 July 1968
North Melbourne	5.8 (38)	Melbourne	6.4 (40)	Arden Street Oval	5,826	27 July 1968
Footscray	9.12 (66)	Fitzroy	10.11 (71)	Western Oval	10,148	27 July 1968
South Melbourne	7.12 (54)	Essendon	14.13 (97)	Lake Oval	14,690	27 July 1968

=== Round 16 ===
Home team	Home team score	Away team	Away team score	Venue	Crowd	Date
Richmond	15.21 (111)	South Melbourne	10.11 (71)	MCG	22,404	3 August 1968
Geelong	11.9 (75)	Melbourne	10.8 (68)	Kardinia Park	14,240	3 August 1968
St Kilda	8.13 (61)	North Melbourne	6.3 (39)	Moorabbin Oval	13,355	3 August 1968
Fitzroy	13.15 (93)	Essendon	13.16 (94)	Princes Park	12,080	3 August 1968
Hawthorn	15.11 (101)	Collingwood	10.16 (76)	Glenferrie Oval	26,928	3 August 1968
Footscray	16.6 (102)	Carlton	10.10 (70)	Western Oval	15,184	3 August 1968

=== Round 17 ===
Home team	Home team score	Away team	Away team score	Venue	Crowd	Date
North Melbourne	7.9 (51)	Richmond	11.19 (85)	Arden Street Oval	9,374	10 August 1968
Geelong	10.7 (67)	Hawthorn	7.9 (51)	Kardinia Park	20,822	10 August 1968
Carlton	18.14 (122)	South Melbourne	11.14 (80)	Princes Park	15,620	10 August 1968
Melbourne	10.14 (74)	Footscray	9.11 (65)	MCG	18,733	10 August 1968
St Kilda	12.19 (91)	Fitzroy	6.5 (41)	Moorabbin Oval	15,643	10 August 1968
Essendon	20.18 (138)	Collingwood	7.11 (53)	Windy Hill	21,300	10 August 1968

=== Round 18 ===
Home team	Home team score	Away team	Away team score	Venue	Crowd	Date
Hawthorn	14.13 (97)	Melbourne	8.11 (59)	Glenferrie Oval	14,359	17 August 1968
Footscray	6.8 (44)	St Kilda	16.13 (109)	Western Oval	15,211	17 August 1968
Fitzroy	10.12 (72)	Geelong	14.10 (94)	Princes Park	9,782	17 August 1968
South Melbourne	9.14 (68)	North Melbourne	11.13 (79)	Lake Oval	7,412	17 August 1968
Richmond	10.14 (74)	Essendon	7.12 (54)	MCG	68,529	17 August 1968
Collingwood	10.10 (70)	Carlton	16.11 (107)	Victoria Park	24,496	17 August 1968

=== Round 19 ===
Home team	Home team score	Away team	Away team score	Venue	Crowd	Date
Hawthorn	11.13 (79)	Richmond	11.22 (88)	Glenferrie Oval	21,772	24 August 1968
Geelong	14.13 (97)	North Melbourne	13.9 (87)	Kardinia Park	13,872	24 August 1968
Essendon	10.6 (66)	St Kilda	9.12 (66)	Windy Hill	24,700	24 August 1968
Carlton	21.17 (143)	Fitzroy	12.19 (91)	Princes Park	16,123	24 August 1968
South Melbourne	11.12 (78)	Footscray	11.16 (82)	Lake Oval	8,012	24 August 1968
Melbourne	12.14 (86)	Collingwood	12.15 (87)	MCG	29,967	24 August 1968

=== Round 20 ===
Home team	Home team score	Away team	Away team score	Venue	Crowd	Date
Fitzroy	17.14 (116)	Hawthorn	18.18 (126)	Princes Park	11,440	31 August 1968
Collingwood	23.19 (157)	South Melbourne	14.14 (98)	Victoria Park	11,648	31 August 1968
Richmond	18.21 (129)	Melbourne	12.8 (80)	MCG	34,546	31 August 1968
St Kilda	16.14 (110)	Geelong	8.11 (59)	Moorabbin Oval	34,073	31 August 1968
Footscray	12.13 (85)	Essendon	15.22 (112)	Western Oval	19,196	31 August 1968
North Melbourne	11.13 (79)	Carlton	15.10 (100)	Arden Street Oval	16,189	31 August 1968

== Ladder ==
(P)	Premiers
	Qualified for finals

#	Team	P	W	L	D	PF	PA	%	Pts
1	Essendon	20	16	3	1	1860	1428	130.3	66
2	Carlton (P)	20	15	5	0	1751	1343	130.4	60
3	Geelong	20	15	5	0	1528	1431	106.8	60
4	St Kilda	20	14	5	1	1718	1263	136.0	58
5	Richmond	20	14	6	0	1889	1536	123.0	56
6	Hawthorn	20	9	10	1	1934	1869	103.5	38
7	Collingwood	20	9	11	0	1623	1717	94.5	36
8	Melbourne	20	8	12	0	1434	1709	83.9	32
9	South Melbourne	20	6	13	1	1639	1954	83.9	26
10	Footscray	20	5	15	0	1413	1710	82.6	20
11	Fitzroy	20	4	16	0	1643	2035	80.7	16
12	North Melbourne	20	3	17	0	1266	1703	74.3	12

Rules for classification: 1. premiership points; 2. percentage; 3. points for
Average score: 82.1
Source: AFL Tables

== Finals series ==
=== Semi-finals ===
Team	1 Qtr	2 Qtr	3 Qtr	Final
Geelong	4.4	9.7	14.10	19.13 (127)
St Kilda	2.4	4.10	8.13	11.17 (83)
Attendance: 98,885

Team	1 Qtr	2 Qtr	3 Qtr	Final
Essendon	1.2	7.6	7.8	8.11 (59)
Carlton	5.8	6.9	11.12	13.17 (95)
Attendance: 106,365

=== Preliminary final ===
Team	1 Qtr	2 Qtr	3 Qtr	Final
Essendon	3.6	7.10	10.18	11.25 (91)
Geelong	5.3	8.6	8.10	9.13 (67)
Attendance: 103,549

=== Grand final ===
Team	1 Qtr	2 Qtr	3 Qtr	Final
Carlton	2.2	6.8	7.9	7.14 (56)
Essendon	2.1	5.1	6.4	8.5 (53)
Attendance: 116,917

== Consolation Night Series Competition ==
The consolation night series were held under the floodlights at Lake Oval, South Melbourne, for the teams (5th to 12th on ladder) out of the finals at the end of the home and away rounds.

Final: Hawthorn 16.15 (111) defeated North Melbourne 6.14 (50).

== Season notes ==
- The season's home-and-away draw was extended from 18 to 20 rounds. This now meant that each team met nine of the other eleven teams twice in a season.
- In Round 3, the Anzac Day match between Carlton and Essendon at Princes Park was greatly affected by an unusually strong wind that blew across the ground from wing to wing, making kicking and marking entirely unpredictable as balls would almost turn at right angles in the air as they moved down the ground towards the outer (eastern) end and lost the protection of the stands (or, whilst in the stand-protected western end, the ball went above the protection of the stands). In an otherwise close, hard-fought match with not many scoring opportunities available, Carlton were least able to cope with the windy conditions, kicking 1.11 (17) to Essendon's 7.8 (50).
- In Round 7, Essendon played Richmond at Windy Hill in a rain-sodden game that finished in such dark conditions that players could not see across the ground. In the last quarter, a goal was awarded to Geoff Gosper, although several Richmond players protested that the ball had hit the post. Essendon won the match by two points, 11.14 (80) to Richmond's 10.18 (78).
- After the Round 8 match between Hawthorn and Richmond at the Melbourne Cricket Ground, the teams and many of the fans left the ground believing the game had been tied 11.15 (81) apiece. After the goal-umpires checked their scorecards, it was confirmed that the scoreboard was reading incorrectly, and that Richmond had, in fact, won by a point: 11.15 (81) to 11.14 (80).
- Peter Hudson became the first player to kick 100 goals in a season since John Coleman in 1952.
- In Round 17 and Round 18 respectively, Ron Barassi and Brian Dixon played their 250th VFL games. At the time, only thirteen other players had reached the milestone.
- After Round 18 of the Under-19s competition, Geelong was stripped of all premiership points that it had earned in matches in which it had fielded ineligible player John Taylor, who was residentially tied to Footscray. The lost points relegated Geelong from fourth to last place on the ladder.

== Awards ==
- The 1968 VFL Premiership team was Carlton.
- The VFL's leading goalkicker was Peter Hudson of Hawthorn who kicked 125 goals.
- The winner of the 1968 Brownlow Medal was Bob Skilton of South Melbourne with 24 votes.
- North Melbourne took the "wooden spoon" in 1968.
- The reserves premiership was won by Essendon. Essendon 15.7 (97) defeated Richmond 13.14 (92) in the Grand Final, held as a curtain-raiser to the seniors Grand Final at the Melbourne Cricket Ground on 28 September.

== Sources ==
- 1968 VFL season at AFL Tables
- 1968 VFL season at Australian Football
