= Geoff Gosper =

Australian rules footballer

Personal information
- Born: 11 May 1940
- Original team: Strathmore (EDFL)
- Height: 175 cm (5 ft 9 in)
- Weight: 78 kg (172 lb)

Playing career^{1}
Years	Club	Games (Goals)
1960–1970	Essendon	168 (68)
- ^{1} Playing statistics correct to the end of 1970.

Geoff Gosper (born 11 May 1940) is a former Australian rules footballer who played for Essendon in the VFL during the 1960s.

Gosper played mostly as a half forward flanker and was recruited to Essendon from Strathmore. He was a reserve in Essendon's 1962 premiership side and on a half forward flank in their 1965 flag.
