= Peter Jones (Australian rules footballer) =

Australian rules footballer (born 1946)

Personal information
- Born: 20 October 1946 (age 80); Hobart, Tasmania
- Original team: North Hobart
- Debut: 13 August 1966, Carlton vs. Melbourne, at Princes Park
- Height: 198 cm (6 ft 6 in)
- Weight: 109 kg (240 lb)

Playing career^{1}
Years	Club	Games (Goals)
1966–1979	Carlton	249 (284)

Coaching career
Years	Club	Games (W–L–D)
1980	Carlton	24 (17–7–0)
- ^{1} Playing statistics correct to the end of 1979.

Career highlights
- 4x VFL premiership player: (1968, 1970, 1972, 1979); Robert Reynolds Trophy: (1973); Carlton Football Club Hall of Fame – Legend status

Peter Kevin "Percy" Jones (born 20 October 1946) is a former Australian rules footballer who played for the Carlton Football Club in the Victorian Football League (VFL).

Playing primarily as a ruckman and forward, Jones became known as one of the game's great characters on and off the field. He was a member of four premiership teams for the Blues during one of the most successful eras in the club's history. After a short-lived stint as Carlton coach, Jones ventured into the hotel industry, owning or co-owning several pubs in Melbourne's inner suburbs.

== Early life and career ==
Jones was born at the Queen Alexandra Hospital in Hobart, the second of four children to Kevin and Mollie Jones (née Macleod), At the age of four, he contracted meningitis and was considered fortunate to survive after undergoing spinal tap treatment.

He played first grade football with North Hobart Football Club, and was selected in the Tasmanian State Team in 1965. He was one of the best Tasmanian players in the team that lost to the combined V.F.A. team, 11.10 (76) to 12.11 (83), in the interstate match played at Toorak Park, on Sunday 18 July 1965—he rucked well, and he kicked two goals.

Jones was initially supposed to play with Richmond.

Graeme Richmond, the Secretary at Richmond, who had visited Jones in Tasmania, had given him several gifts, including a suit, in consideration of Jones remaining in Tasmania for the 1966 season and moving to Victoria to play for Richmond in 1967.

== Carlton ==
However, Carlton officials visited him shortly after and — no doubt, in part, driven by a need to replace Maurie Sankey, the 100-games' ruckman and Carlton vice-captain who had died in a car accident in late November 1965 — promised that, if he came over to Victoria immediately, they would play him in 1966.

Jones had worked as an apprentice auto electrician in Tasmania. Carlton promised him that, upon his arrival in Melbourne, through the intervention of a rabid Carlton fan in the Accounts Section of the Department's Melbourne organisation, they would be able to arrange for him to appointed to a junior administrative position with the Melbourne office of the Commonwealth Department of Social Services, where Adrian Gallagher (and his uncle Murray) also worked.

Jones had no qualms about moving to Melbourne because his grandmother lived in St Kilda.

== Car accident ==
Jones played well in Carlton's pre-season practice games but was then seriously injured in a car accident. A Carlton supporter offered Jones a ride home to his grandmother in St Kilda, but lost control of the car on Royal Parade and smashed at high speed into a tree.

Jones suffered considerable damage to both his lower legs, with fractures in both of his feet and ankles, as well as sustaining an eye injury. He was unable to resume training until 24 May, and even then was asked to limit his kicking practice. The previous evening, he had also been finally cleared by the Tasmanian Football League to play for Carlton.

He was not fit enough to play his first match for Carlton until Round 16 of that year.

== "Percy" ==
His nickname "Percy" was bestowed upon him by Murray Gallagher, the uncle of his best friend, the rover Adrian Gallagher, after "Percy" the name of the enormous penis that was transplanted onto the injured man in the 1971 film Percy.

Jones was later to capitalise further on this anatomical allusion when he stood as a Liberal Party candidate for election to the Lower House of the Victorian Parliament in the early 1980s, with the slogan "Point Percy at Parliament"

== Career at Carlton ==
At the beginning of his career, Jones often had to suffer the competitiveness of John Nicholls, who understood Jones' potential. He was often forced (because Nicholls would not "change" with him) to play the major proportion of each match resting in the forward pocket.

Jones was often criticised early on by Ron Barassi for seeking out his best mates' "Gags" and Brian Kekovich with his hit-outs and his passes.

Regarded as never having played well at Glenferrie Oval, commentators noted he always played brilliantly against Len Thompson at Victoria Park and was, more times than not, best on the ground whenever Carlton played Collingwood at Victoria Park.

In a match against Hawthorn at Moorabbin, Jones is remembered for breaking free from his opponent in the goal-square, running into an open goal, and missing the ball entirely and kicking the goalpost (see Video on YouTube).

He played in six Grand Finals, in two losing teams, in 1969 and 1973 and in four premiership teams 1968, 1970, 1972 and 1979. At the end of the 1979 Grand Final, he was invited onto the dais to hold the premiership cup aloft with captain-coach Alex Jesaulenko

He won Carlton's Best and Fairest Award, the John Nicholls Medal in 1978, and the Best Clubman Award, the B.J. Deacon Memorial Trophy in 1978.

Jones played interstate football for Victoria in 1977, making him one of a small select group who have played for more than one state.

He was selected in the Tasmanian Team of the Century, as well as the North Hobart Football Club's Team of the Century.

== Coaching ==
In 1980, following the dispute at the end of the 1979, which saw the then Carlton coach Alex Jesaulenko resign in sympathy with the sacking of then Carlton President George Harris, Carlton appointed Jones as senior coach.

Although the team performed well during the regular season in round one of 1980, Jones' first match as senior coach, Carlton soundly beat the highly favoured Collingwood, at Victoria Park 19.18 (132) to 13.16 (94) and reached the semi-finals. However, its performance in the final series was far below of what was required by the club and, so, after interviews were held with Jones, Ron Barassi, and David Parkin, Carlton chose to appoint Parkin in place of Jones. Jones was therefore sacked as Carlton Football Club senior coach after just one season.

Jones held no grudge, and served for many years on the Carlton Committee.

== Honours and achievements ==
- Team
  - 4x VFL Premiership player (Carlton): 1968, 1970, 1972, 1979
- Individual
- 1x Robert Reynolds Trophy (Carlton): 1973

== Post-football ==
Married to Jan (née King), and with a daughter Georgia, Jones has spent most of his post-football life running hotels in inner suburban Melbourne (including "Percy's Bar" in Lygon st, Carlton during the 80's).

After apprenticing as an electrician, Jones decided to enter the hotel business in 1975. A year later, while co-running the Dover Hotel with former teammate Adrian Gallagher, both Jones and Gallagher were placed on a six-month bond due to breaches of the licensing act.

Jones also ran Percy's Bar and Bistro on Lygon Street from 1998 until 2014, when it was announced that he was closing the pub because the landlord wished to develop the site.

His speech impediment also explains why all of Jones' valuable and insightful post-football commentating was conducted through the print media, rather than radio or TV.

== Bibliography ==
- Eddy, Dan (2017). Slattery, Geoff (ed.). Larrikins & Legends : the untold story of Carlton's greatest era. The Slattery Media Group. ISBN 9780987342829.
- Jones, P.K. (with Hansen, B.), Percy: The Story of the Carlton Football Club as told by Peter "Percy" Jones, with Brian Hansen (a.k.a. Percy: A Blues Legend), Mount Waverley, Brian Hansen Publications, (Mount Waverley), 1995. ISBN 0-646-24487-6
- Ross, J. (ed), 100 Years of Australian Football 1897–1996: The Complete Story of the AFL, All the Big Stories, All the Great Pictures, All the Champions, Every AFL Season Reported, Viking, (Ringwood), 1996. ISBN 0-670-86814-0
