= Sergio Silvagni =

Australian rules footballer (1938–2021)

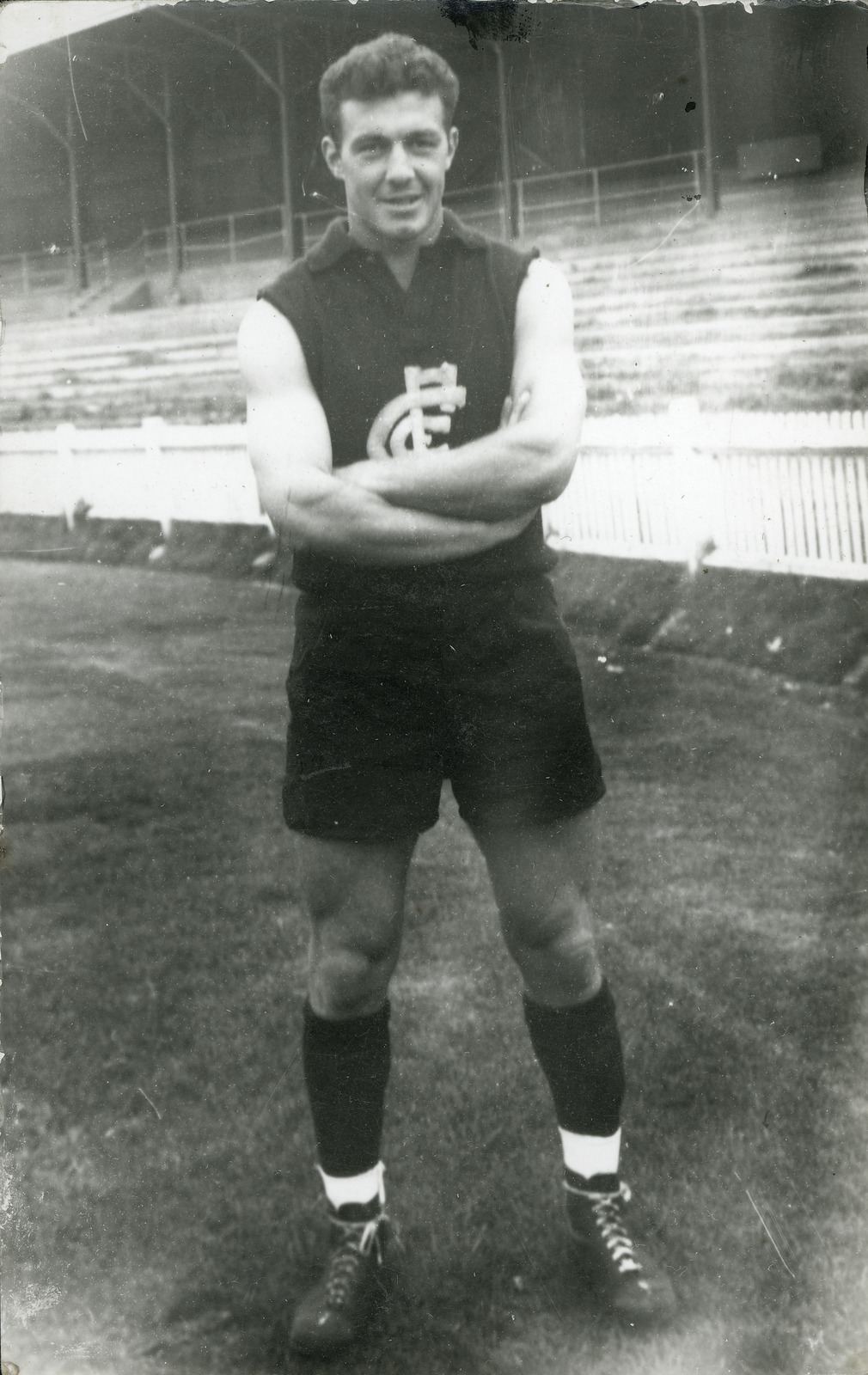

Personal information
- Born: 28 June 1938; Carlton, Victoria
- Died: 15 July 2021 (aged 83); Melbourne
- Original team: Parade College
- Debut: Round 7, 1958, Carlton vs. South Melbourne, at Lake Oval
- Height: 183 cm (6 ft 0 in)
- Weight: 95 kg (209 lb)

Playing career^{1}
Years	Club	Games (Goals)
1958–1971	Carlton	239 (136)

Coaching career
Years	Club	Games (W–L–D)
1978	Carlton	3 (0–3–0)
- ^{1} Playing statistics correct to the end of 1971.

Career highlights
- 2× VFL Premiership player: (1968, 1970); 2× Robert Reynolds Trophy: (1962, 1968); Carlton captain: (1964)

Sergio Valentino Silvagni (28 June 1938 – 15 July 2021) was an Australian rules footballer who played for the Carlton Football Club in the Victorian Football League (VFL), mostly as a ruck-rover. He was the first of three generations to represent Carlton at VFL/AFL level, followed by his son Stephen and grandson Jack.

== Early life and family ==
The son of Italian immigrants Giacomo Silvagni and his wife Antonia, Sergio lived with his parents and sister Milena in a single fronted dwelling in Canning Street, Carlton, very close to the famous Lygon Street precinct, the epicenter of Melbourne's Italian community. Giacomo (also known as "Jack") emigrated to Australia in 1924 from the town of Asiago in the northern Italian province of Vicenza. He was also a first cousin of fellow Carlton footballer John Benetti.

Shortly after Sergio was born, World War II broke out and Italians were considered enemies in Australia. According to the law at the time, Giacomo Silvagni was considered an enemy alien since he had not taken up Australian citizenship, and was sent away to an alien camp in Broadford for several months, living in a tent and cutting timber. Silvagni remembered his father's departure vividly, even though he was only four years old at the time.

Silvagni married his wife Rita in 1963. Their marriage produced four children—son Stephen, and daughters Lisa, Danielle and Michelle.

== Schoolboy athletics ==
Silvagni was educated at St Thomas' Christian Brothers College in Clifton Hill and later at Parade College, and was an outstanding schoolboy athlete. In 1948, competing for St Thomas', he won the Under-11 75-yard sprint at the Victorian Christian Brothers' Combined Athletic Meeting. In 1949, he was the Under-12 handball champion of C.B.C. Clifton Hill. In 1953, running on a rain soaked track, he broke the 440 yard record by half second, clocking 54.4 seconds; he also won the shot put at the combined Christian Brothers Secondary School sports at North Melbourne.

== Career in football ==
=== Carlton ===
Silvagni made his senior VFL debut for Carlton on 24 May 1958 in the Round 7 match against South Melbourne) at the Lake Oval. Although Carlton lost by 22 points, Silvagni, along with his cousin John Benetti, was one of the best Carlton players on the ground.

In his playing career, Silvagni played mainly as a ruck-rover, forming one of the game's most celebrated on-ball divisions with ruckman John Nicholls and rover Adrian Gallagher. He was a member of the 1968 and 1970 premiership teams, and was listed among the best players afield. He also played in the runner-up teams for the 1962 and 1969 premierships. After coming out of retirement in 1970 at the behest of Barassi, Silvagni retired permanently from his playing career at the end of 1971. Silvagni played a total of 239 games and kicked a total of 136 goals for Carlton from 1958 until 1971

=== Post-playing career in the sports administration ===
After retiring from playing in the field, Silvagni held various positions at Carlton, first he served as a committeeman and selector at Carlton.

=== Coaching career ===
Silvagni then later became Carlton's reserves coach, and served as the club's caretaker senior coach for a few weeks in 1978 between the departure of Ian Stewart as senior coach and the appointment of Alex Jesaulenko as captain-coach.

=== Honours ===
In 1989, Silvagni was inducted into the Carlton Hall of Fame, and his membership was elevated to Legend status in 2016. Both he and son Stephen were named in Carlton's Team of the Century as well as the Italian Team of the Century in 2007.

== Death and tribute ==
Silvagni died on 15 July 2021 in Melbourne at the age of 83 after multiple health issues, including a broken leg. He was survived by his wife Rita and four children.

Upon news of his death, Carlton club president Mark LoGiudice released a statement in tribute:

Sergio was and always will be a legendary Carlton person. He was such an important figure to many Carlton supporters growing up during the 1960s, particularly those who had migrated to Australia and could instantly identify with one of their heroes. He would go on to become one of our greatest ever players and his impact on the club will forever hold a significant place in our history books. On and off the field he embodied what it means to be a Carlton person and we offer our heartfelt condolences to his family.
