= 1970 VFL grand final =

Grand final of the 1970 Victorian Football League season

Collingwood	Carlton
14.17 (101)	17.9 (111)
	1	2	3	4
COLL	4.8 (32)	10.13 (73)	13.16 (94)	14.17 (101)
CARL	0.3 (3)	4.5 (29)	12.5 (77)	17.9 (111)
- Date: 26 September 1970, 2:30 pm
- Stadium: Melbourne Cricket Ground
- Attendance: 121,696
- Favourite: Collingwood
- Umpires: Don Jolley

Accolades
- Jock McHale Medallist: Ron Barassi

Broadcast in Australia
- Network: Seven Network
- Commentators: Mike Williamson, Alan Gale, Ted Whitten

The 1970 VFL Grand Final was an Australian rules football game contested between the Carlton Football Club and Collingwood Football Club, held at the Melbourne Cricket Ground (MCG) on 26 September 1970. It was the 73rd annual Grand Final of the Victorian Football League, staged to determine the premiers for the 1970 VFL season. The match was won by Carlton who came back from a 44-point deficit at halftime to win by a margin of 10 points, marking that club's 10th premiership victory.

This game is widely considered to be one of the greatest Grand Finals of all time and, according to one of the key protagonists Ted Hopkins, heralded "the birth of modern football". The attendance figure of 121,696 spectators broke the grand final record set the previous year of 119,165 spectators, and set an all-time attendance record for any football code in Australia that still stands.

== Prologue ==
Collingwood finished 1970 on top of the ladder with 18 wins. Carlton was next with 16 wins, followed by St Kilda and South Melbourne (14 wins each). South Melbourne was participating in its first Finals series since 1945, and got in despite winning only four of their last eight home-and-away matches.

During the home-and-away season, Collingwood and Carlton had played each other twice. In Round 8 at VFL Park, Carlton had led by 29 points at half-time before being overrun to lose by 23. In the return fixture at Victoria Park in Round 19, Collingwood thrashed Carlton by 77 points, at the time the club's greatest winning margin against Carlton. The two clubs faced each other again in the Second Semi-final, which was a closely fought battle won by Collingwood 17.16 (118) d. 17.6 (108). Carlton qualified for the grand final with a comfortable 62-point victory against St Kilda in the preliminary final.

Collingwood had last played in a VFL Grand Final in 1966, which was won by St Kilda by one point, while the Blues were playing in their third consecutive VFL Grand Final. The match was the fourth grand final between the two traditional rivals, the previous occurring in 1910, 1915 and 1938.

Percy Beames, chief football writer for The Age, predicted a Collingwood win, along with four other colleagues, while three tipped a Carlton premiership, among them Geelong full-forward Doug Wade. In his article, Beames cited the Magpies' tenacity, strong finishing ability

== Teams ==
Collingwood named an unchanged line-up from the team that had defeated Carlton in the Second Semi-final. There had been some concern over star ruckman Len Thompson, who had not trained for the entire week leading up to the Grand Final on doctor's orders.

Carlton	Collingwood

Carlton
B:	21 Barry Gill	3 Kevin Hall	30 Vin Waite
HB:	11 John Goold	43 David McKay	35 Barry Mulcair
C:	6 Garry Crane	34 Ian Robertson	15 Phillip Pinnell
HF:	17 Brent Crosswell	42 Robert Walls (a/vc)	5 Syd Jackson
F:	28 Peter Jones	25 Alex Jesaulenko	13 Bert Thornley
Foll:	2 John Nicholls (c)	1 Sergio Silvagni	10 Adrian Gallagher
Res:	22 Neil Chandler	7 Ted Hopkins	
Coach:	Ron Barassi		

Collingwood
B:	9 Colin Tully	21 Jeff Clifton	10 Peter Eakins
HB:	29 Denis O'Callaghan	3 Ted Potter (dvc)	33 Lee Adamson
C:	26 Robert Dean	5 Barry Price	22 John Greening
HF:	18 Max Richardson	28 Len Thompson	27 Con Britt
F:	12 Ross Dunne	6 Peter McKenna	2 Wayne Richardson (vc)
Foll:	14 Graeme Jenkin	1 Terry Waters (c)	8 Des Tuddenham
Res:	15 Bob Heard	23 Ricky Watt	
Coach:	Bob Rose		

Umpires

The umpiring panel for the match, comprising one field umpire, two boundary umpires and two goal umpires is given below.

1970 VFL Grand Final umpires
Position			Emergency
Field:	Don Jolley (1)		Jeff Crouch
Boundary:	Kevin Mitchell (2)	Murray Williams (1)	
Goal:	Reginald Pawley (1)	Thomas Rossiter (3)	

Numbers in brackets represent the number of grand finals umpired, including 1970.

== Match summary ==
Conditions were perfect at the MCG. The attendance of 121,696 spectators was the highest in the history of the league, a record still held today. Carlton captain Nicholls won the toss and chose to kick toward the Punt Road End.

=== First quarter ===
Kicking against a very slight breeze, Collingwood were into attack straight away when umpire Jolley awarded a free kick to ruckman Jenkin from the opening bounce. For the next 20 minutes, the Magpies midfielders continually won the ball and drove deep into the forward line with long kicks, while the Blues struggled to maintain any sort of meaningful possession. Collingwood opened the scoring with behinds before former captain Tuddenham gathered the ball from a handpass under pressure from Max Richardson, evaded an attempted bump and snapped the first goal of the game at the 5-minute mark. Star full-forward McKenna followed up with his first goal of the match at the 13-minute mark, converting a free kick set shot after great play upfield from O'Callaghan, Price and Tuddenham. After his snap shot hit the post earlier in the quarter, Britt received a handball from McKenna in the forward pocket to score Collingwood's third goal at the 23-minute mark. Up to that stage, Carlton had yet to register a score, but the Magpies had not fully capitalized on their momentum, with their score only reading 3 goals 6 behinds (24 points).

It took the Blues until the 23-minute mark of the quarter to register its first score, with a behind to Crosswell after bringing the ball forward through scrappy play. A minute later, Jesaulenko had a great chance to kick Carlton's first goal when he took a strong mark from a rushed kick forward by Silvagni, only to miss his set shot from directly in front. Collingwood responded at the 29-minute mark when a pass from Wayne Richardson found McKenna, whose set shot from 20 yards out on a slight angle gave him his second goal for the game. The quarter-time siren sounded shortly afterward, with Collingwood 29 points ahead.

=== Second quarter ===
The Blues finally scored their first goal of the game in the second minute of the quarter, when rover Gallagher converted his free kick set shot after a careless bump from Jenkin. Collingwood responded almost immediately when McKenna got front position to a long kick into the forward line from Dean and marked strongly before kicking his third goal. Then at the 8-minute mark, the Magpies scored two goals in quick succession; the first came when Clifton intercepted an attempted pass by Gallagher on Carlton's half-forward line and kicked long into attack. Coming out from Collingwood's forward line to gather possession of the ball, Dunne grabbed it on the half volley, turned on to his non-preferred left foot and snapped a long-range goal. Then from the subsequent centre bounce, Collingwood captain Waters sharked Jones' hit-out and sent another long kick into Collingwood's forward line. McKenna was in the right place to gather the bouncing ball and snap his fourth goal to extend Collingwood's lead to 44 points.

The remainder of the quarter was evenly contested, with each side kicking three goals: Robert Walls (Carlton) in the 9th minute, Adrian Gallagher (Carlton) in the 12th minute, Max Richardson (Collingwood) in the 16th minute, McKenna with his fifth goal of the half in the 22nd minute, Sergio Silvagni (Carlton) in the 29th minute and Robert Dean (Collingwood) in the 31st minute. As such, the half time margin remained 44 points.

Notable among the highlights in the quarter came in the 27th minute, when Jesaulenko (Carlton) leapt onto the shoulders of Collingwood ruckman Graeme Jenkin and took a spectacular mark that was judged the official 1970 Mark of the Year. Mike Williamson's TV commentary of the mark, "Oh, Jesaulenko, you beauty!" has endured as famous as the mark itself, and was later included in the Toyota Legendary Moments series of advertisements.

Although the Magpies had built a formidable and seemingly insurmountable half-time lead, there was one incident that had fans worried; Collingwood's superstar full-forward McKenna was groggy after teammate Tuddenham had accidentally floored him with a hip-and-shoulder while flying for a chest mark. McKenna, who already had kicked over 140 goals for the season and five goals in the first half. He would only kick one more goal for the rest of the match. The fact that this goal came from an overhead mark only 2 minutes and 43 seconds after the collision caused the TV commentators to believe that he had recovered. Speaking about the incident forty years later in an interview for the Herald Sun, McKenna recalled that:

I don't remember much after that and nothing from halftime. The club doctor wanted to take me off, but Bobby Rose wouldn't hear of it. In the second half I started to wait for the ball and play in an uncharacteristic fashion. I went home after the game and straight to bed, waking at 10pm and thinking I had better get to the wake.

=== Third quarter ===
During the break, champion Carlton coach Ron Barassi instructed his players to handball and play on at all costs, instituting a strategy to try to nullify Collingwood's long kicking game. A key positional move was the introduction of little-known Ted Hopkins, a small rover, as a substitute for Bert Thornley in the second half.

These changes were highly effective and in the early part of the third quarter, Carlton staged one of the most remarkable purple patches in league history, kicking seven goals in eleven minutes to draw the margin back to only three points. Substitute Ted Hopkins kicked the first two, roving the ball from broken marking contests in the goal square in the 3rd and 4th minutes of the quarter. In the 7th minute, Syd Jackson snapped a goal from near the boundary line in the forward pocket. In the 8th minute, Brent Crosswell kicked a goal from a high tackle free kick. Hopkins kicked his third goal in the 10th minute after receiving a handpass from Robert Walls, who had marked at half-forward; and in the 12th minute, Walls marked at half forward again, this time playing on and kicking the goal himself. Finally, in the 14th minute, from a ball-up in the forward pocket, Hopkins managed to kick the ball to Alex Jesaulenko who scored a goal to bring the margin back to only three points, 10.14 (74) vs 11.5 (71).

Thereafter, Collingwood steadied, and the second half of the third quarter was a much more even contest. In the 20th minute, Collingwood extended the lead to 10 points with a set shot goal by Len Thompson. Two minutes later, Jesaulenko kicked a goal for Carlton from a free kick, and from the ensuing centre bounce, Collingwood responded with a goal to Ross Dunne from a close range mark. In the 28th minute, McKenna marked and kicked his sixth goal from 20m, and shortly before the three-quarter time siren he kicked another behind, to extend the margin to 17 points.

=== Fourth quarter ===
After imploring his team to take risks and play on at every opportunity at half-time, Barassi changed his tone at the three-quarter time huddle, eyeballing each player and declaring, "Win, lose or draw, I'm proud of you." He later revealed that he had kept that line stored in his memory after reading an article by Harry Beitzel in the aftermath of the previous season's Grand final defeat.

Carlton opened the final quarter strongly, but missed two early shots – Hopkins again roving the ball in the goal square before hitting the post from less than a metre out in the first minute, and Jackson missing wide on a long-range set shot – before Thompson kicked a set shot goal in the 5th minute for Collingwood. At this point, Collingwood was 21 points ahead, having scored the last three goals.

Soon after, Carlton had three shots inside three minutes to narrow the margin back to eight points, largely through the efforts of ruckman John Nicholls who was resting forward. He kicked a goal in the 8th minute from a high tackle free kick; then in the 9th minute rucked the ball to Robert Walls, whose snap shot from near the boundary line was just touched on the line by Peter Eakins; and then in the 10th minute took a contested mark and converted another short range set shot. No goals were kicked in the following ten minutes, both teams' defences repeatedly repelling attacks. Collingwood's 19th and 20th men were both brought on to replace cramping teammates.

In the 20th minute, Syd Jackson made a brilliant piece of individual play, smothering then regathering an attempted clearing kick by Eakins, before handpassing to an unmarked Hopkins at full forward, who kicked his fourth goal and brought the margin back to one point. As time-on neared, Crosswell was awarded a free kick for a high tackle from Tuddenham and took his set shot on an angle from 35 metres out. In an interview for the AFL Record 50 years later, Crosswell recalled that “the wind was going slightly right to left and I remember thinking I needed to kick it towards the right goalpost. The kick was slightly right of the goalpost and the wind just took it through, thankfully."

The Blues had taken the lead for the first time in the match, amidst scenes of pandemonium in the stands. In the critical passage of play in the 28th minute, Peter McKenna claimed an overhead mark in the forward-line, having gotten his hands to the ball but just been spoiled from behind, but the umpire called play-on; ten seconds later, Carlton had cleared to centre half-forward, where Jesaulenko gathered and kicked towards the vacant goal, and the ball took four bounces and went through for a goal to put Carlton 11 points ahead. At this point, Carlton had kicked the last 5.2 (32) of the game. Dunne kicked a behind for Collingwood in the 29th minute to narrow the margin to ten points, and the siren went shortly after.

=== Aftermath ===
This was the same winning margin as the Second Semi Final also played at the MCG two weeks earlier between these teams which Collingwood won 17.16 (118) to 17.6 (108). Leading ball winners for Carlton were Crosswell with 23 (17 kicks and 6 handballs), McKay 20 (18 and 2) and Waite 19 (10 and 9). For Collingwood, Price 22 (17 and 5), W. Richardson 22 (21 and 1) and M. Richardson 19 (13 and 6) Brent Crosswell (Carlton) was generally regarded as the best player on the day for his four-quarter contribution, especially in the first half when many Carlton players were not playing well. Hopkins, whose four goals as 19th man became legendary, played only one further game for Carlton, soon quitting football to pursue other interests.

The game was immediately hailed across the Australian sporting press as an all-time classic. In a typically eloquent report for the Canberra Times, respected journalist Rohan Rivett described the Grand final as a 'once-in-a-lifetime match':

Years hence thousands of boys who yelled themselves hoarse will be trying to tell sons or grandsons how it happened. [...] For the uncommitted spectator, if anyone could, remain uninvolved in the frenzy, there were 10½ minutes of luminous football in the third quarter which transformed a hopelessly one-sided struggle into one of the historic sporting occasions. Thereafter the 121,696 people jamming the sundrenched ground simmered or yelled in mounting fever of hope and fear until the last kick.

In his match report for The Age, Percy Beames called Carlton's triumph "a premiership win based on courage, and Ron Barassi's greatest coaching triumph since he crossed from Melbourne." In addressing the moment in the dying stages of the game when McKenna was not paid a mark from which he might have put Collingwood back in front, Beames wrote that he sided with umpire Jolley's decision. He also wrote that the Collingwood players had little excuse for letting down their coach Bob Rose, compared to their losses in 1964 and 1966. Besides their scoring inaccuracy, Beames also criticised Collingwood for their lack of heart and ability to rise to the challenge in the final quarter, as well as focusing too much on their spearhead McKenna, while citing Carlton's evenness as the key to victory.

Carlton runner Rodney Wilkinson, who had taken over the position when Sergio Silvagni came out of retirement midway through the 1970 season, offered a unique perspective on where he believed the outcome of the game had been decided, based on the habits of both coaches:

‘Barass’ sat with [former Carlton player and then chairman of selectors] Jack Wrout upstairs (in the old Smokers Stand?) – but Rose sat with his man, the selector Charlie Utting, on the bench at ground level. The game of football, once it starts, is like a chess game, but in footy you can't see all the pieces from ground level... and I believe Rose was 10 to 15 minutes behind in the 1970 Grand Final, particularly when the game started swinging and moves could have been made. If you look back at the replay of the game, when Hopkins kicked those goals in the third quarter, his opponent Colin Tully was nowhere to be seen. When you're coaching from ground level you don't pick up on a lot of these things, but Barassi, from where he was positioned, would have reacted straight away. Put it this way. If Barassi had coached Collingwood, they’d never have lost it.

The 44-point half-time deficit overcome by Carlton was then the second-largest half-time deficit ever overcome in VFL history. The only larger deficit overcome before this was 52 points, by Collingwood against St Kilda in Round 10 earlier in the season (which remains the record as of 2025).

== Perspective ==
=== "The birth of modern football" ===
One thing we said we must do is handball, and we handball, and we handball and we handball. It was the only possible way to get back into the game. I reminded them of the game out at Hawthorn, where prior to this game our handball was down. So that game we had to handball. And today was the same. I reminded them of it. At half time I think our handball was 13, which was just shocking. And we did something about it and it won us the match.

— Coach Ron Barassi, Jr., speaking to a radio interview after the game.

The style of play displayed by Carlton in the second half, featuring frequent attacking use of handball, playing on quickly from marks, and open fast running play, was a key part of the club's recovery and victory in the game; and coach Ron Barassi's half-time instructions to "handball, handball, handball!" became part of the game's folklore.

The game, and Barassi's half time instructions, are sometimes referred to as "the birth of modern football", a label which critical historical analysis views as symbolic, rather than literal. The style of football played in Victoria had been undergoing a clear change through the 1960s and early 1970s: prior to this, football had mostly been a stop-start game, with players kicking forward to teammates who took a mark, stopped and kicked again, with the handball being used mainly as a defensive or last-resort option; but through this period, attacking use of handball and playing on and short kicks, became more common. Carlton's recovery in the 1970 grand final symbolized this transition perfectly: falling 44 points behind in the first half playing "old football", then recovering to win playing "new football" in the second half.

Nevertheless, the mythology surrounding the game has perpetuated a myth that Barassi's half-time instructions represented a revolutionary, seminal moment which heralded the transition from the old style of football to the modern style. This literal interpretation does not hold up to any critical assessment: Barassi noted that Carlton had been playing a handball style of game throughout 1970, and credited early 1960s Fitzroy coach Len Smith as being the first coach to encourage attacking use of handball in Victoria. Football historian John Devaney assessed likewise that the transition towards handball and playing on had been gradual through the 1960s, and was already a well established tactic both within and outside Victoria in the years before 1970. Barassi and Devaney both also note that Carlton's recovery couldn't be attributed to handball alone, with Hopkins strong play, better overall discipline and winning a higher proportion of possession also key to the recovery.

Sports journalist Jake Niall, writing in 2020 as The Age's chief football writer, argued that the 1970 Grand Final was "the most consequential match in the history of Australian rules football, the game that mattered most". His contention was that the game marked a sliding doors moment in the history of Carlton (who would win a further five VFL premierships in the two decades following) and Collingwood (which over the same time period would endure a period of off-field turbulence and on-field heartache), while also cementing Ron Barassi's status as a coaching genius. Niall also claimed that, to a greater extent, the game also symbolized the values shifts that Australian society was undergoing at the time, where Collingwood was seen to epitomise the "old Australia", being as it was at the time a working-class area with its egalitarian ethos and old-school values of playing for the guernsey, while Carlton, led by ambitious businessmen and recruiting players with somewhat eccentric personalities like Brent Crosswell and John Goold, symbolized the rise of a more enterprising, commercial and cosmopolitan society.

== Scoreboard ==
Grand Final
Saturday, 26 September (2:30 pm)	Collingwood	def. by	Carlton	Melbourne Cricket Ground (crowd: 121,696)	Report
4.8 (32); 10.13 (73); 13.16 (94); 14.17 (101)	Q1; Q2; Q3; Final	0.3 (3); 4.5 (29); 12.5 (77); 17.9 (111)	Umpires: Jolley; Television broadcast: Seven Network
McKenna 6 Tuddenham, Dunne, Thompson 2 Britt, W Richardson 1	Goals	4 Hopkins; 3 Jesaulenko; 2 Gallagher, Walls, Crosswell, Nicholls; 1 Silvagni, Jackson
Tuddenham, Dunne, M Richardson, W Richardson, Jenkin, Waters, McKenna, Price	Best	Crosswell, McKay, Silvagni, Robertson, Nicholls, Jackson, Jesaulenko, Walls
Nil	Injuries	Nil
Nil	Reports	Nil
Carlton won its tenth VFL premiership.; Carlton's comeback from 44 points down at half-time remains the biggest in VFL/AFL Grand Final history.

== See also ==
- 1970 VFL season
- Colliwobbles

== Bibliography ==
- Atkinson, Graeme; Atkinson, Brant (2009). The Complete Book of AFL Finals (5th ed.). Scoresby, Victoria: The Five Mile Press. ISBN 978-1-74211-275-6.
- Flanagan, Martin (2008). "1970". The Last Quarter – A Trilogy. Camberwell East: One Day Hill. ISBN 978-0-9757708-9-4.
