= Denis O'Callaghan =

Denis O'Callaghan may refer to:

- Denis O'Callaghan (Australian rules footballer)
- Denis O'Callaghan (rugby league)

== See also ==
- Dennis J. O'Callaghan, American virologist, immunologist and biochemist
