= Ted Hopkins =

Australian rules footballer, businessman and writer (1949–2023)

Personal information
- Full name: Edward Hopkins
- Born: 27 May 1949
- Died: 20 November 2023 (aged 74)
- Original team: Moe
- Height: 177 cm (5 ft 10 in)
- Weight: 68 kg (150 lb)

Playing career^{1}
Years	Club	Games (Goals)
1968–1971	Carlton	29 (10)
- ^{1} Playing statistics correct to the end of 1971.

Edward Hopkins (27 May 1949 – 20 November 2023) was an Australian rules footballer, businessman and writer. He was most notable for his four-goal effort in the second half of Carlton's remarkable victory in the 1970 VFL Grand Final.

Hopkins died on 20 November 2023, at the age of 74. At the time of his death, Ted resided in Melbourne and had one child, Erica Hopkins.

== Football career ==
Hopkins, who came from Moe, played 29 senior games for the Carlton Football Club as a small rover.

Hopkins was most famous for his performance in Carlton's victory over Collingwood in the 1970 VFL Grand Final. Initially starting on the bench, Hopkins was substituted onto the ground as the 19th man for Bert Thornley at half-time. Within fifteen minutes, he had scored three goals, and assisted on another to Alex Jesaulenko – in a purple patch during which Carlton scored seven goals to erase Collingwood's 44-point half-time lead. He scored a fourth goal late in the final quarter. Carlton won the Grand Final by ten points.

He played only one further game for Carlton before retiring from football to pursue other interests. He kicked a career total of 10 goals.

== Media career ==
Hopkins wrote several pieces of published fiction and poetry. He was also employed as a journalist, publisher and radio presenter. His last project was TedSport, focussing on high-performance sports analysis. He was also co-founder of Champion Books, the Backyard Press Printing Co-operative, and Champion Data, a sports-statistics firm that concentrates on Australian rules football.
