= Syd Jackson (footballer, born 1944) =

Australian rules footballer

Personal information
- Full name: Sydney James Jackson
- Born: 1 July 1944 (age 82)
- Original team: South Bunbury
- Height: 173 cm (5 ft 8 in)
- Weight: 73 kg (161 lb)

Playing career^{1}
Years	Club	Games (Goals)
1963–1967	East Perth	104 (78)
1969–1976	Carlton	136 (165)
1977	Glenelg	13 (21)
Total		253 (264)
- ^{1} Playing statistics correct to the end of 1976.

Career highlights
- East Perth Fairest and Best 1966; 2x VFL Premiership player: 1970, 1972; "The Galahs" representative: 1968 Australian Football World Tour; Indigenous Team of the Century member; East Perth Team of the Century Post War

Sydney James Jackson (born 1 July 1944) is a former Australian rules footballer who played with the Carlton Blues during the 1970s. He usually played in the centre or half forward flank.

An Indigenous Australian, Jackson was a Stolen Generations child and was adopted by Ern Manea. He started his professional footballing career at East Perth in 1963. He was equal first in that year's Sandover Medal count although he was ineligible due to suspension and in 1966 he was named East Perth's best and fairest.

Jackson made his debut with Carlton in 1969 after being recruited by Ron Barassi. He won premierships in the Blues in 1970 and 1972. His jumper number was 5.

He was exonerated by the tribunal after striking Lee Adamson, with the tribunal accepting that he was racially provoked. At the Tribunal hearing Jackson had allowed Carlton's advocate to imply provocation to explain a fight with Adamson. Twenty-two years later he explained that there had been no provocation; Carlton president George Harris had devised the defence to ensure that the talented Jackson was available to play in the grand final. Adamson is quoted as saying he blamed Harris who 'set it up and I have despised him ever since for what he did'.
