= Champion Data =

Australian sports data and analytics company

- Company type: Private
- Industry: Sports technology and data
- Founded: 1995
- Founder: Ted Hopkins
- Headquarters: Southbank, Melbourne, Australia
- Key people: Chris Hume (Director); Aaron Cross (CEO)
- Website: championdata.com

Champion Data is a sports data and analytics company based in Melbourne, Australia. It has been the official statistical data provider to the Australian Football League (AFL) since 1999.

== History ==
Principally rooted in Australian rules football, the company was created by former Carlton footballer Ted Hopkins and his wife Angelika Oehme in 1995. Hopkins' vision was to tabulate statistical data from the Australian Football League (AFL) and provide a "comprehensive and qualitative dimension" with "underlying analysis and commentaries".

Through Champion Data, Hopkins launched the Rev Rankings in the Herald Sun in 1996, an early precursor of AFL Fantasy player ratings. By 1998, Champion Data's statistics were a feature of discussion on The Footy Show. The company then entered in a partnership with the AFL for 1999 and beyond to provide the league with statistical data, an agreement which continues to this day.

== Ownership ==
Hopkins and Oehme sold the business to private ownership in 2007, with the former continuing to work under contract at the company for a number of years following the sale. The current majority owner of the company is Champion Data's director, Chris Hume. The AFL holds the remaining 49% shareholder stake.

== Other sports ==
As well as providing statistical analysis for the AFL Women's, the Talent League and various football state leagues, Champion Data also captures data for Netball Australia and Netball New Zealand's elite competitions. The company has also inked contracts with the National Rugby League, Premier Lacrosse League, and XFL.

== Criticisms ==
According to The Guardian, despite the quality of its data, "Champion Data has monopolised football statistics and is a private company whose aim, like any business, is to make money. The company attracts a lot of scatological abuse for not being more open, but in a small market such as Australia (and the AFL), that’s a lousy business model."
