= Brent Crosswell =

Australian rules footballer (born 1950)

Personal information
- Full name: Brent Tasman Crosswell
- Nickname: Tiger
- Born: 8 August 1950 (age 76); Launceston, Tasmania
- Original team: Campbell Town
- Height: 188 cm (6 ft 2 in)
- Weight: 86 kg (190 lb)
- Position: Utility

Playing career
Years	Club	Games (Goals)
1968–1975	Carlton	98 (92)
1975–1979	North Melbourne	76 (108)
1980–1982	Melbourne	48 (57)
Total		222 (257)

Career highlights
- 4× VFL Premiership player: (1968, 1970, 1975, 1977); Tasmanian Football Hall of Fame, inducted 2005, Icon status 2012

Brent Tasman Crosswell (born 8 August 1950) is a former Australian rules footballer who played for the Carlton Football Club, North Melbourne Football Club and Melbourne Football Club in the Victorian Football League (VFL).

Crosswell, nicknamed 'Tiger', won VFL/AFL premierships with two clubs, placing him in a small group of players to have done so. He has Icon status in the Tasmanian Football Hall of Fame and has been named in the Tasmanian and North Melbourne Teams of the Century. He played under coach Ron Barassi at all three of his clubs for eleven of his fifteen VFL seasons; their professional relationship was reportedly difficult.

== Early life and career ==
Crosswell was born at Launceston's Queen Victoria Hospital to Darrell Crosswell and wife Ruby (née Parsons), He is a paternal first cousin of fellow VFL footballer Craig Davis, Crosswell was educated at Scotch College in Launceston, where he excelled both as a footballer and a high-jumper.

Recruited from Northern Tasmanian club Campbell Town, Crosswell made his VFL debut in 1968 for Carlton. A solid debut season earned him Carlton's 'best first year player' award. They won the 1968 Grand Final by three points. Crosswell was one of Carlton's best players in the famous 1970 Grand Final victory over Collingwood, and fittingly, it was he who kicked the goal that put Carlton in front deep into the final quarter. He missed the 1972 premiership through illness.

In 1975, he left Carlton and went to North Melbourne and played a crucial role during the club's golden period in the 1970s, adding two more premierships to his resume. Crosswell's finals form cannot be faulted, and he featured in the best players list in all his grand final appearances, except in 1976 when he injured himself against Geelong in muddy conditions the previous week. Not to be discounted, the selection committee at the club selected Crosswell in the 1976 grand final side and gave North Melbourne a needed boost, but this was only temporary as his endurance was waning and the injury prevented him from giving 100% that he wanted to show. When Barassi decided to leave North Melbourne, Crosswell moved to his third club, Melbourne, in 1980 and spent his final three seasons of football there.

Crosswell finished his career with eight grand final appearances, including the 1977 replay; and four wins. He is one of only two players to have won more than one grand final at each of two clubs, the other being Mick Grace.

Crosswell is said to be the inspiration for Tasmanian footballer Geoff Hayward in David Williamson's 1977 play The Club.

Crosswell studied an arts degree at Monash University. He was outspoken in opposing the Vietnam War, taking part in the Moratorium marches. Crosswell was a leading campaigner for achieving fairer pay for athletes, advocating strike action to address the exploitative pay conditions of professional football players.

== Post-playing career ==
Since the end of his career, Crosswell has lived with Ménière's disease. His football achievements received formal recognition when he was one of the inaugural inductees into the Tasmanian Football Hall of Fame in 2005. In July 2012, he was upgraded to Icon status.

Crosswell's son Tom Kavanagh also played in the VFL/AFL.

== Bibliography ==
- Flanagan, Martin (2008). "1970". The Last Quarter – A Trilogy. Camberwell East: One Day Hill.
