= Bravery Meeting 78 (Australia) =

The Australian Bravery Meeting 78 awards were announced on 25 March 2013 by the Governor General of Australia, the then Quentin Bryce, AC, CVO.

† indicates an award given posthumously.

== Star of Courage (SC) ==
Star of Courage ribbon

- Trevor Ronald Burns, Queensland

== Bravery Medal (BM) ==
Bravery Medal ribbon

Ronald V Strong Queensland Police

- Raymond BRUCKNER, Queensland
- Stephen Edward de LORENZO, New South Wales
- Samuel Julian EDWARDS, New South Wales
- Ernst GOMSI, Queensland
- Lisa Margaret HALL, New South Wales
- Alfred John HARDING †, South Australia
- Ryan Jon HARVEY, Western Australia
- Bradley Damian HINDMARSH, Queensland
- Johnathon Edward KLAASSEN, Queensland
- David Eric LOWRY, South Australia
- Inspector Bruce James McNAB, Queensland Police
- Samuel James MATTHEWS †, Queensland
- Sollee MORRIS, Western Australia
- Brett MORRISSEY, Queensland
- Bubby Kopaki TUHIWA, Western Australia
- Con VARELA, New South Wales
- Nathan Christopher VISSCHER, New South Wales
- Russell Robert VON NIDA, Queensland
- Ross James WOODTHORPE ANDERSON, New South Wales

== Commendation for Brave Conduct ==
Commendation for Brave Conduct ribbon

- Marlene AGGETT
- Dianne ANVER
- Brendon W ASHBY
- Sergeant Allan Richard ASHMAN of the Australian Army
- Ronald Dale BARASSI AM
- Mitchell Edwin BEARE
- Ian Frederick BLAND
- Jason BRAY
- Craig John BROWNLOW
- Tristan James BURNETT
- Captain Ian Michael CARTER of the Australian Army
- Senior Constable Steven James CLAIR, Queensland Police
- Paul Denzil CLACKETT
- Brian Patrick DELL
- Shane Ross DEVLIN
- David Andrew DONALDSON
- Peter Raymond FENTON †
- Shane Ronald FLEXMAN
- Constable Stuart Adam GREENWELL, Queensland Police
- Sergeant Glen John GUNTHORPE, Queensland Police
- Warren HABAK
- Bryce Lewis HERTSLET
- Douglas Glen HISLOP
- Kevin James HUGHES
- Paul Manuel INACIO †
- Senior Sergeant Perry James IRWIN †, Queensland Police
- Sergeant William Kendall JOHNSON, Queensland Police
- David William KLAASSEN
- Constable Peter Kevin LAMBERT, Queensland Police
- Tammee Lee LYNN
- Bernard William McCAFFERY
- Peter James McCARRON
- Luke Matthew McCORMACK
- Bradley Peter MILLS
- Andrew Eglinton MITCHELL
- Wayne David MURPHY
- Deane William MURRELL
- Andrew Kenneth NEIL
- Supreeda PHENGCHAEM
- Raymond ROBINSON
- Steven Ronald RULE
- John Matthew SACCHETTI
- Sergeant David Jefferson SAMPSON, Queensland Police
- Aiden Mark SIBRAVA
- Constable Matthew SLATTERY, New South Wales Police
- Sam Wilson TOLDI
- Jeffrey John van AALST
- James Edward WILKIN
- Robert John WILKIN
- Constable Steven John WILLIAMSON, Queensland

== Group Bravery Citation ==
Awardees are several members of the Queensland Fire and Rescue Service Swift Water Rescue team, involved in a rescue in the Lockyer Valley during the Queensland floods January 2011:

- Nathan Cole CHADWICK, Queensland
- Geoffrey Mervyn DIXON, Queensland
- Mark Andrew MEIER, Queensland
- Philip Karl PAFF, Queensland
- Mark STEPHENSON, Queensland
- Kerry John WEIR, Queensland

Awardees are the helicopter crew ‘Firebird 460’ during the Queensland Floods in the Lockyer Valley on 10 January 2011:

- John Andrew McDERMOTT, Queensland
- Simon John McDERMOTT, Queensland
- Benjamin James SUTHERLAND, Queensland

Awardees are the helicopter crew ‘Helitak 220’ during the Queensland Floods in the Lockyer Valley on 10 January 2011:

- Kris LARKIN, New South Wales
- Edward LEE, New South Wales
- Matthew O'BRIEN, New South Wales
- Kendall Rurri THOMPSON, New South Wales

Awardees are members of Queensland Police who rescued several people in the Lockyer Valley during the Queensland floods January 2011:

- Inspector Stephen John DABINETT
- Senior Sergeant David Richard EDDEN
- Senior Sergeant Timothy Allan PARTRIGE
- Sergeant Tony Del VECCHIO
- Senior Constable Kim Edward BEVIS
- Senior Constable Jason Michael BUTLER
- Senior Constable Dean William GEORGE
- Senior Constable Summer NORTON
- Senior Constable Paul Andrew ROWLAND
- Senior Constable Jamie VEA VEA
- Senior Constable Peter Chee WONG
- Senior Constable Shane Francis WRIGHT
- Constable Andrew Charles CHEE

Awardees are members of the public who secured moving vessels on the flooded Burnett River at Bundaberg, during the Queensland floods on 30 December 2010:

- John SCHOTT, Queensland
- Ian WILLETT, Queensland

Awardees are members of Queensland Police who rescued several people in Grantham during the Queensland floods on 10 January 2011:

- Inspector Bradley John WRIGHT
- Sergeant Justin Edward MALLORY
- Senior Constable Brett Michael DUKE
- Senior Constable Matthew Anthony GROOM
- Senior Constable Brett William HAMPSON
- Senior Constable Jonathon Arrow LARMORE
- Senior Constable James WORTHINGTON
- Senior Constable Nathan Andrew WRIGHT BM

Awardees are members of the public who rescued several people in Grantham during the Queensland floods on 10 January 2011:

- Christopher John FORDEN, Queensland
- Iain Scott GRAY, Queensland
- Allan James PAYNE, Queensland
- Peter Paul van den ELSEN, Queensland

Awardees are Naval cadets from TS Ipswich, as volunteer boat crews, and one member of Queensland Police, who rescued several people from Goodna during the Queensland floods on 12 January 2011:

- Senior Constable Jonathon Edward KIRKMAN
- Andrew Phillip SHORTLAND
- Cassandra Louise BROADFOOT
- Andrew D'Arcy KELLY
- Jonathan Andrew KLAEBE
- Frank Kerswell MARTIN
- Justin Luke MARTIN
- James Richard RUNHAM SC AFSM OAM
- Brendon David WEBER

Awardees are a crew of an Emergency Management Queensland rescue helicopter in the Lockyer Valley during the Queensland floods on 10 January 2011.

- Mark McKnight KEMPTON, Queensland
- Daren William PARSONS, New South Wales
- Doctor Glenn Edward RYAN, Queensland
- Illya Jon SELMES, Queensland
- Mark Donald TURNER, New South Wales

Awardees are a crew of an Emergency Management Queensland rescue helicopter in the Lockyer Valley during the Queensland floods on 10 January 2011.

- Brett Terence KNOWLES, Queensland
- Peter Richard ROW, Queensland
- David TURNBULL, Queensland
- Stuart John WARK, Queensland

Awardees are several members of the public who rescued two people from a burning vehicle near Goulburn, New South Wales on 13 May 2011.

- Shane Michael ELLEM, New South Wales
- Malcolm John PEDEN, New South Wales
- Justin Craig ROWLES, New South Wales

Awardees are members of the public who assisted victims of a motor vehicle accident at Merton, Victoria on 3 May 2009.

- Anthony David BLACK, Victoria
- John Douglas CLAPTON, Victoria
- Ann GREEN, Victoria
- Jason Edward KNEEBONE, Victoria
- Matthew Nicholas ROBERTS, Victoria
- Geoffrey Richard STEPHENS, Victoria
- Kenneth Edward SUSSEX, Victoria

Awardees are members of the public who rescued a woman caught in a rip at Tallows Beach, New South Wales on 27 November 2008.

- Edward James ADCOCK, New South Wales
- Zachary John BROOKER, New South Wales
- Christopher Richard JARVIS, New South Wales
- Bernard William McCAFFERY, New South Wales
- Ross James WOODTHORPE ANDERSON, New South Wales

Awardees are members of the public who rescued a woman from a submerged vehicle at Maroochydore, Queensland on 24 February 2011.

- Joshua Andy MACPHERSON, Queensland
- Rebecca Anne MURRELL, Queensland
- Sam Wilson TOLDI, Queensland

Awardees are members of the public who rescued of a family of four from a burning vehicle at Sassafras, Victoria on 29 December 2011.

- Brian Stanley CORNISH, Victoria
- Nicholas John GASCOIGNE, Victoria
- Donald MacGregor ORR, Victoria
- Steven Ronald RULE, Victoria
- Yvonne Mary RULE, Victoria
