= Alex Jesaulenko =

Australian rules footballer (born 1945)

Alex Jesaulenko, MBE

Personal information
- Full name: Oleksandr Vasiliovych Jesaulenko
- Nickname: Jezza
- Born: 2 August 1945 (age 81); Salzburg, Allied-occupied Austria
- Original team: Eastlake (CANFL)
- Height: 182 cm (6 ft 0 in)
- Weight: 84 kg (185 lb)

Playing career^{1}
Years	Club	Games (Goals)
1967–1979	Carlton	256 (424)
1980–1981	St Kilda	23 (20)
Total		279 (444)

Representative team honours
Years	Team	Games (Goals)
	Victoria	15

Coaching career^{3}
Years	Club	Games (W–L–D)
1978–1979	Carlton	42 (35–7–0)
1980–1982	St Kilda	64 (13–49–2)
1989–1990	Carlton	34 (18–15–1)
Total		140 (66–71–3)
- ^{1} Playing statistics correct to the end of 1981.^{3} Coaching statistics correct as of 1990.

Career highlights
- 4× VFL Premiership player: (1968, 1970, 1972, 1979); Jock McHale Medal: (1979); 2x All-Australian team: (1969, 1972); 3x Carlton leading goalkicker: (1969, 1970, 1971); Carlton captain: (1974–76, 1978–79); Robert Reynolds Trophy: (1975); St Kilda captain: (1981); AFL Team of the Century; Carlton Team of the Century; Australian Football Hall of Fame inducted 1996, Legend status 2008; MBE: 1979; Sport Australia Hall of Fame: 2010

Oleksandr Vasiliovych "Alex" Jesaulenko MBE (/ˌdʒɛzəˈlɛŋkoʊ/ JEZ-ə-LENK-oh; Ukrainian: Олександр Васильович Єсауленко, romanized: Oleksandr Vasiliovych Yesaulenko, IPA: [olekˈsɑndr wɐˈsɪlʲowɪtʃ jesɐʊˈlɛnko]; born 2 August 1945) is a former Australian rules footballer and who played for the Carlton Football Club and the St Kilda Football Club in the Victorian Football League (VFL). He also served as a coach at both clubs.

Jesaulenko is a Legend of the Australian Football Hall of Fame, and as a player was known for his versatility, uncanny balance and spectacular marking. He immortalised his reputation in the game by taking the most iconic mark in football history in the 1970 VFL Grand Final. In 2009 The Australian nominated Jesaulenko as one of the 25 greatest footballers never to win a Brownlow Medal.

Recruited from Canberra, Jesaulenko has played more games and kicked more goals than any other player from the Australian Capital Territory. He represented his home territory in 1978. His popularity caused the code to surge in popularity there, and he remains a household name in the ACT.

He remains to date the only Carlton footballer to have kicked 100 or more goals in a season, and the last player-coach to win a VFL/AFL premiership (1979).

In 2002, he was inducted into the Ukrainian Sports Hall of Fame. On 20 October 2010, he was inducted into the Sport Australia Hall of Fame. In July 2013, Jesaulenko was named captain of the first Australia Post Multicultural Team of Champions.

In January 2022, Jesaulenko was diagnosed with Parkinson's disease.

== Early life ==
Jesaulenko was born in Salzburg, then Allied-occupied Austria. His father, Vasil, was Ukrainian and served as a German policeman during World War II. His mother, Vera, was born in Russia, and she had survived the horrors of seeing her father shot dead by German soldiers and having her first child, whom she first gave the name Alex, taken away from her when she was in a German prison camp. The child was not heard of again until over fifty years later.

Along with many other Eastern Europeans who were World War II refugees or displaced persons, the Jesaulenkos emigrated to Australia via the Norwegian passenger ship SS Skaugum. They arrived in the port of Melbourne on 28 July 1949. They spent the first six months living at the Bonegilla Migrant Reception and Training Centre. According to Jesaulenko, the family name should have been spelt Esaulenko, but immigration officials listed "Esaulenko" with a "J" in front, thinking that they had heard a "J" in his name.

From there, the family moved to Canberra, where Vasil set up shop as a carpenter-cabinetmaker. The young Jesaulenko was enrolled at St Edmund's College and then Telopea Park High, where he played soccer and rugby union. He did not start playing Australian rules football until he was 14 years old. He began playing at the Eastlake Football Club in Canberra.

== Playing career ==
=== Early playing career ===
Jesaulenko has credited his time at Eastlake for instilling in him a winning culture. After breaking into the senior team, he quickly established himself as a star, playing in three consecutive premierships for Eastlake from 1964 to 1966.

=== Carlton ===
On joining Carlton, Jesaulenko reflected in an interview with The Canberra Times that:

[Eastlake] certainly provided a winning culture. I was lucky to play at a footy club that was on the way up that just had a new regime put in, with George Harris and his mob, appointed a new coach in Ronald Dale Barassi, they had experienced players and they recruited young guns ... and I just fitted into the mix.

Jesaulenko moved to Melbourne with his wife Anne in November 1966, and during his first pre-season was soon left in no doubt the standard that Barassi required at Carlton:

Here was this raging, serious man who demanded excellence and perfection. I knew straight away if I didn't take this game seriously, if I didn't try to be the best, I would be in big trouble. But it only took me two or three practice matches to know myself these guys were just the same as me, no better than me, and it was just a matter of me getting myself into the thick of things.

Jesaulenko made his senior VFL debut in the opening round of the 1967 season against Fitzroy at Princes Park, where he had 14 touches and kicked two goals in a 94-point victory. He would play every game for Carlton that season, one of four players to do so. In that season's Brownlow Medal count, he would poll 15 votes to finish third behind eventual winner Ross Smith (24 votes) from St Kilda and North Melbourne's Laurie Dwyer (17 votes). Jesaulenko would go on to play in four Carlton premierships – in 1968, 1970, 1972 and 1979. Jesaulenko was selected for All-Australian honours in 1969 and 1972. He also has the dubious record at Carlton for the most inaccurate score of 5 goals and 12 behinds, against Hawthorn in 1969.

In December 1969, Jesaulenko put an end to newspaper rumours that he might leave Carlton and either play football in Western Australia or return to Canberra. It was well known that he was working as a barman at a Melbourne hotel at the time, and was receiving little more than the "average" player. In an article for The Canberra Times, Jesaulenko reiterated his commitment to Carlton:

There is absolutely no chance of my returning to Canberra next season nor for that matter for the next two or three seasons. [...] I have had a long discussion with Carlton officials and I am now more than happy to stay with the Blues.

A spectacular and popular player, Jesaulenko was renowned for his high marking, mercurial ground play, superb balance and goalkicking. He kicked 115 goals in the 1970 season, breaking the club record and becoming the first (and, as of 2021, only) player to kick more than 100 goals in a season for Carlton. He went on to play in the famous 1970 VFL Grand Final against Collingwood. In front of an all-time record MCG crowd of 121,696 fans, Carlton came from a 44-point deficit at half-time to win by 10 points.

=== "Oh, Jesaulenko, you beauty!" ===
Jesaulenko's marking skill was perhaps best highlighted by a spectacular mark over big Collingwood ruckman Graeme Jenkin in the 1970 VFL Grand Final. The commentary has Mike Williamson shouting the now-famous phrase: "Oh, Jesaulenko, you beauty!". This "specky" is acclaimed by some to be the "Mark of the Century", and it was the first to be recognised officially as the Mark of the Year; the medal awarded to the annual winner is called the Alex Jesaulenko Medal. Jesaulenko has downplayed the specky, citing other marks he took—even during the same game—as greater feats. He later said: "The images make it look classical, like it was taken from the marking manual, ... It was against Collingwood, a Grand Final, the biggest crowd ever, Graeme's a six-foot-four ruckman, I guess there's a mystique in standing on top of him with your arms outstretched." The mark is captured in Jamie Cooper's painting The Game That Made Australia, commissioned by the AFL in 2008 to celebrate the 150th anniversary of the sport.

=== Media commitments ===
For a brief period in 1977, Jesaulenko wrote a weekly Tuesday column for The Canberra Times called 'Jezza on Rules'. In his first article on 5 April, he spoke of the Night Series rift between the VFL and the then National Football League (the VFL had separated itself from this umbrella organisation the previous year) and advocated the formation of a national competition:

The two separate night series will prove nothing and achieve little. Both will survive, but neither will prosper to the same degree as one half the response as one fully national competition would do.
The ideal solution to the night-series dispute lies somewhere between the structures of the two present competitions. The VFL must play along with all the other States and games must be spread (televised) right around Australia.

Jesaulenko's vision would be realised 13 years later when the VFL became the Australian Football League.

=== 1978–1981: The last VFL captain-coach ===
The 1978 VFL season began dreadfully for Carlton. After finishing top of the ladder in 1976 but losing the Preliminary Final by one point and then losing in the last round of the home-and-away season to miss out on the finals in 1977, they had brought Ian Stewart over from South Melbourne to replace Ian Thorogood as senior coach. By Round 6, they had only won one game and were sitting second-last on the ladder, and Stewart had gone. Carlton president George Harris turned to Sergio Silvagni to fill the void while a long-term replacement was being sought, but on the suggestion of media personality Michael Williamson, Harris gave the job to Jesaulenko.

Jesaulenko's sporting achievements were recognised outside the football world as well; he was included in the 1979 New Year Honours list as a Member (Civil) of the Order of the British Empire "for service to the sport of Australian Rules football".

Jesaulenko continued on as Carlton's captain-coach in 1979. With a superb support cast, the Blues took out the minor premiership with 19 wins and also set a new VFL record for the largest-scoring aggregate in a home-and-away season (2,772 points). In the second quarter of the Round 10 match against Collingwood at Princes Park, Jesaulenko was running back with the flight of the ball when he was met heavily by Stan Magro, resulting in concussion and a shoulder injury. The Blues were trailing by 25 points at that stage, but they rallied and fought back with a strong second half to win by 16 points. Amazingly, Jesaulenko was back in action just two weeks later in the Round 12 game against Geelong at Kardinia Park; trailing by 30 points at the last change, Carlton almost pulled off a great comeback, eventually falling short by six points.

After the 43-point win against Essendon in Round 15 at Princes Park, in which he had 22 touches and kicked a goal, Jesaulenko missed the next six games with what was later revealed to be a back injury; he had suffered damage to his sciatic nerve which had caused him to lose feeling in his right leg. He underwent a daily 30-minute exercise routine to strengthen his stomach and back muscles, returning to on-field action in time for the final round of the home-and-away season against South Melbourne at Princes Park.

Jesaulenko was, in fact, the last player-coach in the VFL/AFL to win a premiership, and he is likely to remain so indefinitely.

Jesaulenko had pay disputes with Carlton in 1977. Subsequently, he tied his ongoing presence at the club to then-Carlton club president George Harris. At the end of the 1979 season, despite the premiership, Harris was ousted from his position as President of Carlton Football Club, and Jesaulenko walked out on Carlton and resigned from the club.

=== St Kilda ===
In a deal managed by trucking multimillionaire (now billionaire) and St Kilda club president Lindsay Fox, Jesaulenko moved to the St Kilda Football Club in 1980. While initially appointed as an on-field player only, Jesaulenko was then appointed playing coach when the incumbent St Kilda senior coach, Mike Patterson, was sacked by Fox after Round 2. He played 23 games and kicked 20 goals for the Saints in 1980–1981 and stayed on for a further season as senior coach. Jesaulenko retired as a player after Round 8 on 16 May 1981. He was the last person to serve as captain-coach in the VFL; however, Malcolm Blight was a player-coach at North Melbourne until Round 16 of the same season but was not captain during this time.

== Later years in football and coaching career ==
After leaving St Kilda, Jesaulenko went north to serve as captain-coach of Sandgate in the then-Queensland Football League. He retired at the end of 1984 after Sandgate lost their semi-final, after which he moved into the hotel business in Queensland for several years.

=== Carlton Football Club senior coach (1989–1990) ===
In the first half of the 1989 VFL season, Carlton was in disarray when communication had almost completely broken down between the players and senior coach Robert Walls, who only two seasons prior had guided the Blues to the flag. Carlton had fallen one game short of the Grand Final in 1988 but started the 1989 season with five straight losses. The defining point came after losing to the Brisbane Bears by three points in Round 10 at home, with Warwick Capper kicking the winning goal after the siren. At that stage, the Blues were second-last on the ladder with only two wins and in danger of "winning" their first-ever wooden spoon. Walls was sacked as Carlton Football Club senior coach two days after the match. Jesaulenko had not been back at Carlton since his acrimonious departure almost a decade earlier, when he was appointed caretaker senior coach of Carlton for the remainder of the 1989 season. Holding his first press conference after training at Princes Park for the upcoming match against Sydney, he seemed confident in restoring Carlton's fortunes:

I don't think it will take too long to get back into the scene... The technique might have changed a bit but the basics are still the same. We'll play basic football at Carlton from now on.

Jesaulenko's optimism appeared to rub off on the Carlton players; they beat Sydney by 28 points and would win six more games to finish eighth. This finish to the season was enough for Jesaulenko to be re-appointed as Blues senior coach for 1990, but he wasn't able to maintain the momentum and Carlton under Jesaulenko finished out of the finals yet again with a mid-table 11-11 record and another eighth placing when The Blues were expected to return to the top of the ladder in 1990 but won only fifty percent of their games. Jesaulenko stepped down as Carlton Football Club senior coach at the end of the 1990 season and was replaced by David Parkin, who returned in his second stint as Carlton senior coach.

=== Other coaching roles ===
His last coaching appointment, at Coburg for the 1993 season, was a total disaster, with the Lions losing all eighteen games during a losing sequence of thirty games in the dying days of the Victorian Football Association.

== Post-football honours ==
When Carlton set up their Hall of Fame in 1987, Jesaulenko was one of the inaugural inductees. He was also an inaugural inductee into the Australian Football Hall of Fame in 1996, and in 2008 was elevated to Legend status. In 1996, he was also named on the half-forward flank in the AFL Team of the Century.

In 1997, he was inducted as an official Legend of the Carlton Football Club. When the Carlton Team of the Century was announced, Jesaulenko was also named on the half-forward flank.

In 2002, he was inducted into the Ukrainian Sports Hall of Fame.

On 20 October 2010, he was inducted into the Sport Australia Hall of Fame.

In July 2013, Jesaulenko was named captain of the first Australia Post Multicultural Team of Champions.

Upon being elevated to Legend status in the Australian Football Hall of Fame, Jesaulenko was accorded tribute from the great contemporaries of his era.

The great Ron Barassi, Jesaulenko's first coach at Carlton, said:

Aussie rules was very lucky that Alex chose our game. I've no doubt he would've been a brilliant international player for rugby or rugby league or soccer. I first saw his reflexes playing social tennis. He was at the net, he was unbelievable, and I remember thinking, 'Gee whiz, this guy's something special', and I had not even seen him kick a ball yet.

Of his induction as a Legend in the Hall of Fame, Hawthorn opponent Leigh Matthews said:

Jezza was the Buddy Franklin of his era. He was a fantastic mark, but was fantastic at ground level, and that combination doesn't exist in many players. Jezza was a freak. He was about 182 cm, only a couple inches taller than me. He was a bit like Darrel Baldock of the '60s; great balance, low centre of gravity, sensational overhead.

Richmond opponent Kevin Bartlett regarded Jesaulenko as the most important player at Carlton during the years where the Richmond–Carlton rivalry reached its apex during the late 1960s and early 1970s:

When we played Carlton, it was always, 'How do we stop Jezza?' He was the talk of the day and if we got on top of him you killed the spirit of Carlton. He was such a devastating player, an inspirational player, and at Richmond, he was absolutely one of the players we had enormous respect for. He had the capability to be best on ground and had that magical quality to lift teammates. If he played well, he made another 10 players play well.

North Melbourne opponent and Brownlow Medallist Malcolm Blight was equally generous in his praise for Jesaulenko:

Ahh, Jezza. He brings a smile to your face, doesn't he, and bit of excitement. Jezza ... gee, he was good. I still haven't seen anyone with quite as good a balance as Jezza. Whether it be on the ground going for a ball or in the air, his balance was uncanny. He is an icon of the game, absolutely, no question, and as they say in the classics, could play.

== Relationship with Richard Pratt ==
After retiring from football, Jesaulenko worked for billionaire and noted Carlton patron Richard Pratt at his recycling firm Visy for 15 years in the sales and public relations department.

Jesaulenko first met Pratt when he arrived at Carlton in 1966, and remembered him fondly:

He was a great businessman, a great bloke and a great Australian ... He touched people personally even though he was running such a big company. You'd think everyone he worked with was a personal friend of his. He used to come around every year like a footy coach and give everybody a confidence boost. He'd say 'This is what the company is doing ... let's get out there and kill 'em''.

He was adamant that Pratt saved Carlton when he became club president during 2007:

He didn't only save [Carlton] with his money. I don't think money had much to do with it. [...] The club was losing its soul there for a long time. He got it back on track. Now it's going to be up to the people at Carlton now to keep it going.

When it was known that Pratt was in his last days in April 2009, Jesaulenko contemplated paying him a farewell visit at his mansion, but thought better of it lest he attracted too much attention.

== Cultural references ==
During the 1970s, when people spoke about football, it was common for people to refer to taking a high mark as "taking a Jezza". In a 1970s Life. Be in it. advertisement, the character "Norm" says "Beauty, Jezza" while watching football.

Jesaulenko is mentioned in the 1985 song "The Back Upon Which Jezza Jumped" by Melbourne band TISM (This Is Serious, Mum), appearing on the band's self-titled demo tape. The song depicts Graeme "Jerker" Jenkin being left to be forgotten because of Jezza's spectacular mark.

The main character in the Australian children's book Jezza is a dog named after Alex Jesaulenko. "Ordinary dogs chase tennis balls or fetch silly sticks. But not me. Football's my game. My new family called me Jezza because that was the name of a famous footballer. He was brilliant. I don't mean to brag, but I'm quite a footballer too." (Bell, 1991).

In 2006, Jesaulenko was featured in a Toyota Memorable Moments commercial with Stephen Curry and Dave Lawson, which involved spray-painting Jesaulenko's navy suit and trying several methods to recreate the famous mark he took in the 1970 Grand Final, including a small trampoline, a stepladder and finally succeeded with a large crane.

In 2012, singer-songwriter Tex Perkins wrote and performed "Jesaulenko You Beauty" exclusively for The Marngrook Footy Show.

== Bibliography ==
- Bell, K 1991, Jezza, Macmillan Australia, Melbourne.
- Eddy, Dan (2017). Slattery, Geoff (ed.). Larrikins & Legends : the untold story of Carlton's greatest era. The Slattery Media Group. ISBN 9780987342829.
- TISM,1985, This Is Serious Mum – Demo Tape, Melbourne.
