= Barry Mulcair =

Australian rules footballer

Personal information
- Born: 1 October 1948 (age 78)
- Original team: South Bendigo (Bendigo FL)
- Debut: Round 13, 1970, Carlton vs. Geelong, at Princes Park
- Height: 185 cm (6 ft 1 in)
- Weight: 86 kg (190 lb)

Playing career^{1}
Years	Club	Games (Goals)
1970–1971	Carlton	20 (0)
- ^{1} Playing statistics correct to the end of 1971.

Career highlights
- VFL Premiership player: (1970)

Barry Mulcair (born 1 October 1948) is a former Australian rules footballer who played for the Carlton Football Club in the Victorian Football League (VFL).

Recruited from the South Bendigo Football Club, Mulcair made his debut for Carlton in Round 13 of the 1970 VFL season against Geelong. Named on the half-back flank, he was one of their best players, but shortly after the game notified club officials of his intent to return to country football. Mulcair was eventually persuaded to stay and ended up winning the "Best First Year Player Award". He played at half back in Carlton's premiership side that year.
