= Colin Beard =

Australian rules footballer and coach (1941-2019)

Personal information
- Full name: Colin Harry Beard
- Born: 12 December 1941; Melbourne, Victoria
- Died: 20 August 2019 (aged 77)
- Original team: South Fremantle (WAFL)
- Height: 188 cm (6 ft 2 in)
- Weight: 93 kg (205 lb)

Playing career^{1}
Years	Club	Games (Goals)
1959–1967, 1972	South Fremantle	167 (79)
1969–1971	Richmond	33 (0)
Total		200 (79)

Coaching career^{3}
Years	Club	Games (W–L–D)
1974–1976	South Fremantle	68 (40–28–0)
- ^{1} Playing statistics correct to the end of 1972.^{3} Coaching statistics correct as of 1976.

Career highlights
- Richmond Premiership Player 1969; Richmond Reserves Premiership Player 1971; WA Interstate Games: 2; South Fremantle Hall of Fame

Colin Harry Beard (12 December 1941 – 20 August 2019) was an Australian rules football player and coach. He played for South Fremantle in the West Australian Football League (WAFL) between 1959 and 1972 and for the Richmond Football Club in the VFL between 1969 and 1971.

After winning South Fremantle's best and fairest award in 1966 and representing Western Australia in two interstate games in 1967, he was recruited by Richmond in 1968 to replace their retiring full back Fred Swift. However, the WAFL refused to clear him, and Beard had to sit out of football for a year and was unable to play for Richmond until the 1969 VFL season. He played in nine wins from his first ten games including winning the 1969 VFL Grand Final.

He returned to South Fremantle after his three seasons at Richmond but only played 6 games in the 1972 WANFL season before retiring. He became the coach of the Bulldogs' senior team from 1974 to 1976. He was inducted into South Fremantle's Hall of Fame in 2015.
