= John Benetti =

Australian rules footballer and coach

Personal information
- Full name: John Anthony Benetti
- Nicknames: Tank, Troubles
- Born: 17 June 1937
- Died: 31 October 2013 (aged 76)
- Original team: CBC Parade
- Height: 177 cm (5 ft 10 in)
- Weight: 80 kg (176 lb)

Playing career^{1}
Years	Club	Games (Goals)
1958–1965	Carlton	88 (15)
- ^{1} Playing statistics correct to the end of 1965.

John Anthony Benetti (17 June 1937 – 31 October 2013) was an Australian rules footballer who played for the Carlton Football Club in the Victorian Football League (VFL).

Benetti was a popular player with Carlton supporters, who nicknamed him "Tank" due to his thick thighs and direct style of play from defence. He also earned the nickname "Troubles" from Carlton's then Chairman of Selectors Jack Wrout in response to his habit of complaining whenever he was omitted from the senior team.

Benetti had played schoolboy football at CBC Parade alongside his first cousin Sergio Silvagni, who also started at Carlton in 1958. From 16 games in 1958, Benetti polled 12 Brownlow Medal votes to finished equal 13th overall and the best placed Carlton player. After such a strong showing in his first season, he only played eight games in 1959, but got his first taste of finals football when he appeared in a preliminary final.

Used mostly as a defender during his career, Benetti played finals again in 1962 and was in the back pocket in the Carlton side which lost the 1962 VFL Grand Final. The following year he was one of four Carlton players to appear in all 18 rounds and represented the VFL in an interstate match against South Australia.

He played his final VFL game in 1965, then joined Oakleigh as captain-coach for the 1966 Victorian Football Association season. He was dropped from the playing team at midseason due to poor form, and immediately resigned upon being informed that the financially struggling club could not afford to pay him as a non-playing coach. Oakleigh's win-loss record was 0–9 when Benetti resigned, and the club was ultimately relegated at the end of the year.
