= Graeme Jenkin =

Australian rules footballer

Personal information
- Nickname: Jerker/Jerka
- Born: 5 September 1945 (age 81)
- Original team: Collingwood Police Boys
- Height: 193 cm (6 ft 4 in)
- Weight: 104 kg (229 lb)

Playing career^{1}
Years	Club	Games (Goals)
1964–1973	Collingwood	127 (77)
1974–1976	Essendon	22 (10)
1976-1977	Brunswick	19 (20)
Total		168 (107)
- ^{1} Playing statistics correct to the end of 1976.

Graeme "Jerker" Jenkin (born 5 September 1945) is a former Australian rules footballer who played with Collingwood and Essendon in the VFL during the 1960s and 1970s.

Jenkin is best remembered for being the player that Carlton's Alex Jesaulenko took a spectacular mark over in the 1970 Grand Final, prompting the famous call of "Oh, Jesaulenko, you beauty!" by commentator Mike Williamson.

A ruckman, Jenkin first appeared for Collingwood in the 1963 season and, after managing just three games that year, missed all of 1965 with a broken leg. He returned in 1966 but couldn't break into their finals side, and, with first-choice ruckman Ray Gabelich retiring that year, he looked like getting more regular game time. However, the emergence of Len Thompson again relegated him to secondary ruckman, but he played full seasons in 1970 and 1971.

In 1974, he was traded to Essendon in a swap for John Williams but struggled in his time there with injury. In July 1976, he transferred to Brunswick in the Victorian Football Association.

He is the subject of a song by the Melbourne group TISM titled "The Back Upon Which Jezza Jumped", included on the album Gentlemen, Start Your Egos.
