= Bob Heard =

Australian rules footballer

Personal information
- Full name: Robert Heard
- Born: 9 February 1949 (age 77)
- Original team: Preston (VFA)
- Height: 202 cm (6 ft 8 in)
- Weight: 97 kg (214 lb)
- Position: Ruckman

Playing career^{1}
Years	Club	Games (Goals)
1968-1969, 1981	Preston	41 (50)
1970–75	Collingwood	106 (110)
1976–79	Richmond	54 (45)
Total		201 (205)
- ^{1} Playing statistics correct to the end of 1979.

Robert "Bob" Heard (born 9 February 1949) is a former Australian rules footballer who played with Collingwood and Richmond in the Victorian Football League (VFL) during the 1970s.

Heard began his senior career in the Victorian Football Association with the Preston Football Club. Heard won back-to-back Division 1 premierships with Preston in 1968 and 1969, and was one of the best on the ground in the 1968 Grand Final.

Heard moved to Collingwood in the Victorian Football League in 1970. Standing at 202 cm, Heard is believed to have become Collingwood's tallest ever player when he made his league debut in 1970. A tap ruckman, he started on the bench as 19th man in the 1970 VFL Grand Final, which Collingwood lost to Carlton and although he never played in a premiership team he took part in nine finals during his time at the club. Heard was also handy when rested in the forward line and kicked 32 goals in 1974.

He got a clearance to Richmond after finding himself dropping down the rucking order behind Len Thompson and Peter Moore. He added 54 senior games during his four seasons at the Tigers including being the captain of the Reserves grade Premiership side in 1977. In 1980 he rejoined his original club Preston in the VFA.
