= Jeff Clifton =

Australian rules footballer

Personal information
- Full name: Jeff N. Clifton
- Born: 21 February 1949
- Died: 18 October 2010 (aged 61)
- Original team: Floreat Park
- Height: 193 cm (6 ft 4 in)
- Weight: 84 kg (185 lb)
- Position: Full-back

Playing career^{1}
Years	Club	Games (Goals)
1969–1974	Collingwood	102 (0)
1975–1976	Fitzroy	9 (0)
Total		111 (0)
- ^{1} Playing statistics correct to the end of 1976.

Jeff Clifton (21 February 1949 – 18 October 2010) was an Australian rules footballer who played with Collingwood and Fitzroy in the Victorian Football League (VFL).

Clifton, from Western Australia, was a regular member of the Collingwood defence during the early 1970s. He was their full-back in Collingwood's 1970 VFL Grand Final loss to Carlton and in 1975 made the switch to Fitzroy which enabled him to play a further two league seasons. He died from prostate cancer in 2010.
