= 1973 VFL season =

77th season of the Victorian Football League (VFL)

1973 VFL premiership season
- Teams: 12
- Premiers: Richmond; 8th premiership
- Minor premiers: Collingwood; 16th minor premiership
- Brownlow Medallist: Keith Greig (North Melbourne)
- Coleman Medallist: Peter McKenna (Collingwood)

Attendance
- Matches played: 138
- Total attendance: 3,338,648 (24,193 per match)
- Highest: 116,956

The 1973 VFL season was the 77th season of the Victorian Football League (VFL), the highest level senior Australian rules football competition in Victoria. The season featured twelve clubs, ran from 7 April until 29 September, and comprised a 22-game home-and-away season followed by a finals series featuring the top five clubs.

The premiership was won by the Richmond Football Club for the eighth time, after it defeated Carlton by 30 points in the 1973 VFL Grand Final.

== Background ==
One of the most significant innovations that came into force in 1973 was the implementation of a painted centre diamond area with 45-metre long sides, with a maximum of four players from each team permitted to stand within the diamond at centre bounces. Following a long period of lobbying by the VFL to the Australian Football Council for its introduction, the centre diamond was initially subject to a 12-month trial period. The purpose of this innovation was to try and solve the problem of congestion at centre bounces, as well as giving skilled players more space to benefit their teams.

The home-and-away season consisted of 22 rounds, with teams facing each other twice; matches 12 to 22 were the "home-and-away reverse" of matches 1 to 11. At the conclusion of the home-and-away fixtures, the 1973 VFL Premiers were determined by the specific format and conventions of the "McIntyre final five system".

== Home-and-away season ==
=== Round 1 ===
Home team	Home team score	Away team	Away team score	Venue	Crowd	Date
Melbourne	9.12 (66)	St Kilda	14.14 (98)	MCG	44,737	7 April 1973
Fitzroy	20.17 (137)	Footscray	12.15 (87)	Junction Oval	14,988	7 April 1973
Essendon	19.13 (127)	Richmond	19.15 (129)	Windy Hill	27,959	7 April 1973
Collingwood	17.22 (124)	South Melbourne	6.12 (48)	Victoria Park	23,412	7 April 1973
North Melbourne	14.14 (98)	Hawthorn	9.16 (70)	Arden Street Oval	15,934	7 April 1973
Geelong	10.8 (68)	Carlton	18.16 (124)	Kardinia Park	26,130	7 April 1973

=== Round 2 ===
Home team	Home team score	Away team	Away team score	Venue	Crowd	Date
Hawthorn	14.14 (98)	Melbourne	13.22 (100)	Glenferrie Oval	13,128	14 April 1973
Carlton	18.15 (123)	North Melbourne	14.12 (96)	Princes Park	29,185	14 April 1973
Richmond	18.19 (127)	Geelong	16.14 (110)	MCG	29,665	14 April 1973
St Kilda	20.8 (128)	Fitzroy	10.11 (71)	Moorabbin Oval	23,662	14 April 1973
South Melbourne	15.19 (109)	Essendon	21.20 (146)	Lake Oval	16,260	14 April 1973
Footscray	11.16 (82)	Collingwood	14.18 (102)	Western Oval	24,794	14 April 1973

=== Round 3 ===
Home team	Home team score	Away team	Away team score	Venue	Crowd	Date
Collingwood	21.23 (149)	Geelong	11.13 (79)	Victoria Park	24,042	21 April 1973
St Kilda	12.9 (81)	Richmond	17.8 (110)	Moorabbin Oval	33,022	21 April 1973
North Melbourne	11.18 (84)	Fitzroy	10.18 (78)	Arden Street Oval	18,704	21 April 1973
South Melbourne	17.16 (118)	Footscray	20.15 (135)	Lake Oval	13,199	23 April 1973
Melbourne	11.9 (75)	Carlton	11.16 (82)	MCG	49,439	23 April 1973
Hawthorn	27.8 (170)	Essendon	15.12 (102)	VFL Park	32,045	23 April 1973

=== Round 4 ===
Home team	Home team score	Away team	Away team score	Venue	Crowd	Date
Richmond	11.18 (84)	North Melbourne	14.20 (104)	MCG	48,923	25 April 1973
St Kilda	8.12 (60)	Collingwood	19.16 (130)	VFL Park	49,552	25 April 1973
Geelong	17.16 (118)	South Melbourne	12.14 (86)	Kardinia Park	14,739	28 April 1973
Fitzroy	13.9 (87)	Melbourne	13.16 (94)	Junction Oval	16,101	28 April 1973
Carlton	14.11 (95)	Hawthorn	12.11 (83)	Princes Park	27,913	28 April 1973
Footscray	8.19 (67)	Essendon	17.13 (115)	Western Oval	25,314	28 April 1973

=== Round 5 ===
Home team	Home team score	Away team	Away team score	Venue	Crowd	Date
Melbourne	13.13 (91)	Richmond	16.14 (110)	MCG	37,667	5 May 1973
Essendon	16.26 (122)	Geelong	15.16 (106)	Windy Hill	19,007	5 May 1973
South Melbourne	6.12 (48)	St Kilda	10.16 (76)	Lake Oval	13,513	5 May 1973
Hawthorn	18.16 (124)	Footscray	16.12 (108)	Glenferrie Oval	11,402	5 May 1973
North Melbourne	13.20 (98)	Collingwood	15.19 (109)	Arden Street Oval	27,048	5 May 1973
Carlton	15.15 (105)	Fitzroy	10.8 (68)	VFL Park	19,654	5 May 1973

=== Round 6 ===
Home team	Home team score	Away team	Away team score	Venue	Crowd	Date
Fitzroy	15.17 (107)	Hawthorn	12.13 (85)	Junction Oval	10,706	12 May 1973
Collingwood	15.10 (100)	Melbourne	10.16 (76)	Victoria Park	21,360	12 May 1973
Geelong	11.14 (80)	Footscray	14.14 (98)	Kardinia Park	15,305	12 May 1973
St Kilda	18.13 (121)	Essendon	21.14 (140)	Moorabbin Oval	23,120	12 May 1973
Richmond	18.20 (128)	Carlton	15.12 (102)	MCG	54,139	12 May 1973
North Melbourne	18.16 (124)	South Melbourne	11.14 (80)	VFL Park	10,020	12 May 1973

=== Round 7 ===
Home team	Home team score	Away team	Away team score	Venue	Crowd	Date
Melbourne	17.10 (112)	South Melbourne	12.11 (83)	MCG	16,075	19 May 1973
Footscray	14.9 (93)	St Kilda	13.12 (90)	Western Oval	14,953	19 May 1973
Essendon	20.24 (144)	North Melbourne	11.8 (74)	Windy Hill	26,907	19 May 1973
Carlton	16.23 (119)	Collingwood	8.12 (60)	Princes Park	43,531	19 May 1973
Hawthorn	19.15 (129)	Geelong	9.14 (68)	Glenferrie Oval	11,621	19 May 1973
Fitzroy	12.8 (80)	Richmond	16.21 (117)	VFL Park	19,539	19 May 1973

=== Round 8 ===
Home team	Home team score	Away team	Away team score	Venue	Crowd	Date
Collingwood	15.13 (103)	Fitzroy	10.8 (68)	Victoria Park	20,822	26 May 1973
Richmond	10.22 (82)	Hawthorn	16.23 (119)	MCG	32,613	26 May 1973
St Kilda	16.10 (106)	Geelong	8.12 (60)	Moorabbin Oval	15,114	26 May 1973
North Melbourne	8.8 (56)	Footscray	8.8 (56)	Arden Street Oval	16,148	26 May 1973
South Melbourne	7.9 (51)	Carlton	19.16 (130)	Lake Oval	14,659	26 May 1973
Melbourne	10.11 (71)	Essendon	12.9 (81)	VFL Park	25,603	26 May 1973

=== Round 9 ===
Home team	Home team score	Away team	Away team score	Venue	Crowd	Date
Geelong	14.6 (90)	North Melbourne	18.13 (121)	Kardinia Park	18,868	4 June 1973
Footscray	9.14 (68)	Melbourne	10.14 (74)	Western Oval	17,973	4 June 1973
Fitzroy	16.8 (104)	South Melbourne	7.15 (57)	Junction Oval	10,119	4 June 1973
Carlton	19.19 (133)	Essendon	13.14 (92)	Princes Park	39,646	4 June 1973
St Kilda	11.12 (78)	Hawthorn	8.16 (64)	Moorabbin Oval	22,521	4 June 1973
Richmond	10.6 (66)	Collingwood	15.15 (105)	VFL Park	55,827	4 June 1973

=== Round 10 ===
Home team	Home team score	Away team	Away team score	Venue	Crowd	Date
North Melbourne	11.14 (80)	St Kilda	7.12 (54)	Arden Street Oval	16,387	9 June 1973
Essendon	15.17 (107)	Fitzroy	14.13 (97)	Windy Hill	16,632	9 June 1973
South Melbourne	9.8 (62)	Richmond	13.14 (92)	Lake Oval	10,726	9 June 1973
Melbourne	20.19 (139)	Geelong	11.15 (81)	MCG	19,900	9 June 1973
Hawthorn	14.11 (95)	Collingwood	15.18 (108)	Glenferrie Oval	19,963	9 June 1973
Carlton	13.13 (91)	Footscray	9.11 (65)	VFL Park	18,205	9 June 1973

=== Round 11 ===
Home team	Home team score	Away team	Away team score	Venue	Crowd	Date
Melbourne	13.12 (90)	North Melbourne	12.9 (81)	MCG	32,957	16 June 1973
Footscray	7.16 (58)	Richmond	17.7 (109)	Western Oval	16,733	16 June 1973
Collingwood	23.16 (154)	Essendon	16.16 (112)	Victoria Park	31,754	16 June 1973
Geelong	16.8 (104)	Fitzroy	11.15 (81)	Kardinia Park	12,786	16 June 1973
St Kilda	13.13 (91)	Carlton	9.13 (67)	Moorabbin Oval	25,081	16 June 1973
South Melbourne	11.10 (76)	Hawthorn	17.17 (119)	VFL Park	9,436	16 June 1973

=== Round 12 ===
Home team	Home team score	Away team	Away team score	Venue	Crowd	Date
Hawthorn	12.13 (85)	North Melbourne	10.10 (70)	Glenferrie Oval	12,380	23 June 1973
Carlton	17.12 (114)	Geelong	9.13 (67)	Princes Park	14,202	23 June 1973
St Kilda	11.14 (80)	Melbourne	6.18 (54)	Moorabbin Oval	24,262	23 June 1973
Richmond	15.21 (111)	Essendon	13.17 (95)	MCG	43,892	23 June 1973
South Melbourne	12.5 (77)	Collingwood	15.9 (99)	Lake Oval	12,484	23 June 1973
Footscray	10.15 (75)	Fitzroy	13.11 (89)	VFL Park	7,016	23 June 1973

=== Round 13 ===
Home team	Home team score	Away team	Away team score	Venue	Crowd	Date
Fitzroy	10.11 (71)	St Kilda	20.11 (131)	Junction Oval	14,776	30 June 1973
Essendon	20.19 (139)	South Melbourne	16.14 (110)	Windy Hill	13,042	30 June 1973
Collingwood	13.17 (95)	Footscray	14.6 (90)	Victoria Park	18,253	30 June 1973
Melbourne	15.15 (105)	Hawthorn	15.22 (112)	MCG	25,787	30 June 1973
North Melbourne	16.19 (115)	Carlton	16.11 (107)	Arden Street Oval	19,355	30 June 1973
Geelong	13.11 (89)	Richmond	21.7 (133)	VFL Park	13,219	30 June 1973

=== Round 14 ===
Home team	Home team score	Away team	Away team score	Venue	Crowd	Date
North Melbourne	11.12 (78)	Richmond	17.15 (117)	Arden Street Oval	19,114	7 July 1973
Collingwood	15.13 (103)	St Kilda	12.10 (82)	Victoria Park	25,312	7 July 1973
South Melbourne	18.15 (123)	Geelong	12.6 (78)	Lake Oval	9,681	7 July 1973
Melbourne	19.20 (134)	Fitzroy	14.13 (97)	MCG	13,105	7 July 1973
Hawthorn	14.24 (108)	Carlton	12.14 (86)	Glenferrie Oval	18,316	7 July 1973
Essendon	21.6 (132)	Footscray	13.19 (97)	VFL Park	12,417	7 July 1973

=== Round 15 ===
Home team	Home team score	Away team	Away team score	Venue	Crowd	Date
Footscray	12.7 (79)	South Melbourne	20.21 (141)	Western Oval	11,115	14 July 1973
Fitzroy	16.12 (108)	North Melbourne	13.18 (96)	Junction Oval	9,886	14 July 1973
Essendon	23.13 (151)	Hawthorn	18.8 (116)	Windy Hill	22,437	14 July 1973
Carlton	18.14 (122)	Melbourne	12.9 (81)	Princes Park	22,283	14 July 1973
Geelong	13.10 (88)	Collingwood	13.18 (96)	Kardinia Park	15,892	14 July 1973
Richmond	13.12 (90)	St Kilda	11.11 (77)	VFL Park	31,502	14 July 1973

=== Round 16 ===
Home team	Home team score	Away team	Away team score	Venue	Crowd	Date
St Kilda	14.16 (100)	South Melbourne	13.15 (93)	Moorabbin Oval	17,454	21 July 1973
Footscray	6.9 (45)	Hawthorn	9.11 (65)	Western Oval	10,987	21 July 1973
Richmond	16.14 (110)	Melbourne	9.19 (73)	MCG	30,492	21 July 1973
Geelong	12.10 (82)	Essendon	11.15 (81)	Kardinia Park	16,746	21 July 1973
Fitzroy	12.19 (91)	Carlton	11.14 (80)	Junction Oval	14,800	21 July 1973
Collingwood	10.11 (71)	North Melbourne	11.10 (76)	VFL Park	25,650	21 July 1973

=== Round 17 ===
Home team	Home team score	Away team	Away team score	Venue	Crowd	Date
Essendon	15.12 (102)	St Kilda	10.19 (79)	Windy Hill	21,469	28 July 1973
Carlton	15.17 (107)	Richmond	10.21 (81)	Princes Park	28,592	28 July 1973
South Melbourne	19.16 (130)	North Melbourne	14.7 (91)	Lake Oval	13,637	28 July 1973
Hawthorn	15.10 (100)	Fitzroy	9.9 (63)	Glenferrie Oval	12,386	28 July 1973
Melbourne	12.15 (87)	Collingwood	17.24 (126)	MCG	37,838	28 July 1973
Footscray	21.15 (141)	Geelong	13.14 (92)	VFL Park	13,546	28 July 1973

=== Round 18 ===
Home team	Home team score	Away team	Away team score	Venue	Crowd	Date
Geelong	14.11 (95)	Hawthorn	14.10 (94)	Kardinia Park	13,546	4 August 1973
St Kilda	15.20 (110)	Footscray	12.14 (86)	Moorabbin Oval	15,217	4 August 1973
Richmond	15.14 (104)	Fitzroy	13.14 (92)	MCG	20,578	4 August 1973
North Melbourne	13.13 (91)	Essendon	14.10 (94)	Arden Street Oval	21,071	4 August 1973
Collingwood	19.7 (121)	Carlton	15.16 (106)	Victoria Park	37,660	4 August 1973
South Melbourne	12.14 (86)	Melbourne	11.12 (78)	VFL Park	15,255	4 August 1973

=== Round 19 ===
Home team	Home team score	Away team	Away team score	Venue	Crowd	Date
Hawthorn	11.11 (77)	Richmond	12.10 (82)	Glenferrie Oval	20,236	11 August 1973
Footscray	10.8 (68)	North Melbourne	10.14 (74)	Western Oval	13,581	11 August 1973
Essendon	17.13 (115)	Melbourne	15.11 (101)	Windy Hill	18,008	11 August 1973
Carlton	20.17 (137)	South Melbourne	11.14 (80)	Princes Park	22,181	11 August 1973
Fitzroy	10.19 (79)	Collingwood	19.10 (124)	Junction Oval	19,103	11 August 1973
Geelong	13.8 (86)	St Kilda	11.17 (83)	VFL Park	19,477	11 August 1973

=== Round 20 ===
Home team	Home team score	Away team	Away team score	Venue	Crowd	Date
Hawthorn	11.11 (77)	St Kilda	15.8 (98)	Glenferrie Oval	16,952	18 August 1973
Collingwood	8.11 (59)	Richmond	14.16 (100)	Victoria Park	28,286	18 August 1973
North Melbourne	9.10 (64)	Geelong	7.6 (48)	Arden Street Oval	11,121	18 August 1973
Melbourne	10.13 (73)	Footscray	17.8 (110)	MCG	12,563	18 August 1973
South Melbourne	15.11 (101)	Fitzroy	14.21 (105)	Lake Oval	8,584	18 August 1973
Essendon	10.7 (67)	Carlton	17.9 (111)	VFL Park	36,160	18 August 1973

=== Round 21 ===
Home team	Home team score	Away team	Away team score	Venue	Crowd	Date
Richmond	22.11 (143)	South Melbourne	13.16 (94)	MCG	24,307	25 August 1973
Geelong	17.11 (113)	Melbourne	14.14 (98)	Kardinia Park	15,489	25 August 1973
St Kilda	16.18 (114)	North Melbourne	14.12 (96)	Moorabbin Oval	29,257	25 August 1973
Fitzroy	13.22 (100)	Essendon	9.23 (77)	Junction Oval	14,875	25 August 1973
Footscray	10.15 (75)	Carlton	9.12 (66)	Western Oval	18,988	25 August 1973
Collingwood	16.10 (106)	Hawthorn	13.10 (88)	VFL Park	48,059	25 August 1973

=== Round 22 ===
	Round 22
Saturday, 1 September (2:10 pm)	Carlton 20.15 (135)	def.	St Kilda 13.9 (87)	Princes Park (crowd: 22,824)	Report
Saturday, 1 September (2:10 pm)	Essendon 16.6 (102)	def. by	Collingwood 17.10 (112)	Windy Hill (crowd: 28,049)	Report
Saturday, 1 September (2:10 pm)	Fitzroy 17.15 (117)	def.	Geelong 14.17 (101)	Junction Oval (crowd: 9,172)	Report
Saturday, 1 September (2:10 pm)	Richmond 10.16 (76)	def. by	Footscray 11.11 (77)	MCG (crowd: 24,671)	Report
Saturday, 1 September (2:10 pm)	Hawthorn 16.20 (116)	def.	South Melbourne 11.13 (79)	Glenferrie Oval (crowd: 9,932)	Report
Saturday, 1 September (2:10 pm)	North Melbourne 11.5 (71)	def.	Melbourne 9.12 (66)	VFL Park (crowd: 9,411)	Report
Footscray ended its otherwise disappointing season on a high note with a third consecutive victory, this time the eventual premiers Richmond. After scores were level at three-quarter time, ruckman Gary Dempsey was moved to full-forward where he kicked two key goals. Former Carlton rover Adrian Gallagher (with 31 kicks) and Bernie Quinlan were outstanding for the Bulldogs, while Kevin Bartlett was by far the Tigers' best.; Hawthorn snapped its four-game losing streak and farewelled Glenferrie Oval in style with a hard-fought win over a plucky South Melbourne side. Leading by only five points at the main break, the Hawks kicked clear in the second half to win by 37 points. Leigh Matthews was easily best-on-ground with 36 touches and 3 goals, while Michael Moncrieff chimed in with six goals.

== Ladder ==
(P)	Premiers
	Qualified for finals

#	Team	P	W	L	D	PF	PA	%	Pts
1	Collingwood	22	19	3	0	2356	1878	125.5	76
2	Richmond (P)	22	17	5	0	2301	1957	117.6	68
3	Carlton	22	15	7	0	2342	1850	126.6	60
4	Essendon	22	13	9	0	2443	2341	104.4	52
5	St Kilda	22	12	10	0	2024	1922	105.3	48
6	North Melbourne	22	11	10	1	1938	1986	97.6	46
7	Hawthorn	22	11	11	0	2194	2002	109.6	44
8	Fitzroy	22	9	13	0	1990	2194	90.7	36
9	Footscray	22	7	14	1	1860	2109	88.2	30
10	Melbourne	22	7	15	0	1938	2111	91.8	28
11	Geelong	22	6	16	0	1903	2426	78.4	24
12	South Melbourne	22	4	18	0	1932	2445	79.0	16

Rules for classification: 1. premiership points; 2. percentage; 3. points for
Average score: 95.5
Source: AFL Tables

== Finals series ==
=== Finals week 1 ===
	Qualifying final
Saturday, 8 September (2:30 pm)	Richmond 10.11 (71)	def. by	Carlton 13.13 (91)	MCG (crowd: 86,386)	Report

	Elimination final
Saturday, 8 September (2:30 pm)	Essendon 13.13 (91)	def. by	St Kilda 24.14 (158)	VFL Park (crowd: 53,405)	Report

=== Finals week 2 ===
	Semi-finals
SF1: Saturday, 15 September (2:30 pm)	Richmond 15.18 (108)	def.	St Kilda 9.14 (68)	MCG (crowd: 86,483)	Report
SF2: Saturday, 15 September (2:30 pm)	Collingwood 12.15 (87)	def. by	Carlton 15.17 (107)	VFL Park (crowd: 60,072)	Report

=== Preliminary final ===
	Preliminary final
Saturday, 22 September (2:30 pm)	Collingwood 14.14 (98)	def. by	Richmond 15.15 (105)	MCG (crowd: 98,652)	Report
Collingwood became the first team under the McIntyre final five system to exit in straight sets

=== Grand final ===
	Grand final
Saturday, 29 September (2:30 pm)	Carlton 12.14 (86)	def. by	Richmond 16.20 (116)	MCG (crowd: 116,956)	Report
This was the second consecutive VFL Grand final meeting between Richmond and Carlton

== Season notes ==
- The VFL introduced a new clearance system, "10-year rule", in order to render the VFL immune from the sorts of "restraint of trade" difficulties that were being experienced, at the time, in New South Wales in relation to Rugby League footballers, whereby any VFL player who had played ten years with a single club was eligible for a free transfer to the club of his choice.
  - Although twenty-two VFL players were eligible to do so, only six players, George Bisset (Footscray to Collingwood), Barry Davis (Essendon to North Melbourne), Carl Ditterich (St Kilda to Melbourne), Adrian Gallagher (Carlton to Footscray), John Rantall (South Melbourne to North Melbourne), and Doug Wade (Geelong to North Melbourne) took advantage of the new rule. The rule was rescinded in May 1973.
  - The new North Melbourne coach Ron Barassi recruited champion half-backs Barry Davis (who had already played 218 games for Essendon), John Rantall (who had already played 174 games for South Melbourne), and champion full-forward Doug Wade (who had already played 208 games for Geelong). North Melbourne improved from last place in 1972 to sixth in 1973.
- In Round 11 Kevin Murray played his 300th game for Fitzroy.
- In Round 21, Hawthorn full-forward Peter Hudson, who had been injured in Round 1 of 1972, returned to the VFL. He beat four opponents and kicked 8 goals.
- In Round 22, Hawthorn hosted its last senior VFL football match at Glenferrie Oval. The ground was notable for its temperamental playing surface and narrow flanks (wedged between the railway line on the one side and houses on the other). The venue had long been described by football fans as "the sardine can". Hawthorn subsequently played its home games at Princes Park for the next eighteen seasons.
- The Richmond Football Club won the premiership in all grades in 1973: its Senior Team, Reserves Team and Under-19 team all won their Grand Finals at the Melbourne Cricket Ground on Grand Final Day; and the Essex Heights Football Club, which served as Richmond's Under-17 team, won the South-East Suburban League premiership.

== Awards ==
- The 1973 VFL Premiership team was Richmond.
- The VFL's leading goalkicker was Peter McKenna of Collingwood who kicked 84 goals (including 2 goals in the finals).
- The winner of the 1973 Brownlow Medal was Keith Greig of North Melbourne with 27 votes.
- South Melbourne took the "wooden spoon" in 1973.
- The reserves premiership was won by Richmond. Richmond 17.18 (120) defeated Geelong 8.12 (60) in the grand final, held as a curtain-raiser to the seniors Grand Final at the Melbourne Cricket Ground on 29 September.

== Sources ==
- 1973 VFL season at AFL Tables
- 1973 VFL season at Australian Football
