= Bert Thornley =

Australian rules footballer and coach

Personal information
- Full name: Gilbert Thomas Thornley
- Born: 3 September 1942 (age 84)
- Original team: East Fremantle (WANFL)
- Debut: Round 3, 1969, Carlton vs. Footscray, at Whitten Oval
- Height: 178 cm (5 ft 10 in)
- Weight: 80 kg (176 lb)

Playing career^{1}
Years	Club	Games (Goals)
1961–1967	East Fremantle (WAFL)	131 (72)
1969–1970	Carlton (VFL)	24 (3)
1971	Preston (VFA)	8 (3)
Total		163 (78)

Representative team honours
Years	Team	Games (Goals)
1966	Western Australia	
- ^{1} Playing statistics correct to the end of 1970.

Gilbert Thomas 'Bert' Thornley (born 3 September 1942) is a former Australian rules footballer who played with Carlton in the VFL.

== Football ==
Thornley, a defender who could kick with both feet, was recruited to Carlton from East Fremantle Football Club in the Western Australian Football League, and made his VFL debut during the 1967 season.

Selected as a resting forward-pocket rover, Thornley played in the 1970 VFL Grand Final. He was replaced, at half-time, by eventual match hero Ted Hopkins.

He finished his playing career at Preston Football Club in the Victorian Football Association (VFA) before becoming the coach of Torquay.

== See also ==
- 1966 Hobart Carnival
- 1970 VFL Grand Final
