= Robert Dean (footballer) =

Australian rules footballer

Personal information
- Full name: Robert N. Dean
- Born: 20 October 1950 (age 76)
- Original team: Ivanhoe Amateurs
- Height: 189 cm (6 ft 2 in)
- Weight: 83 kg (183 lb)
- Position: Wing/Centre half forward

Playing career^{1}
Years	Club	Games (Goals)
1969–75	Collingwood	121 (37)
1976–80	South Melbourne	66 (81)
Total		187 (118)
- ^{1} Playing statistics correct to the end of 1980.

Career highlights
- South Melbourne leading goalkicker, 1976

Robert Dean (born 20 October 1950) is a former Australian rules footballer who played with Collingwood and South Melbourne in the Victorian Football League (VFL) during the 1970s.

While at Collingwood, Dean was used as a wingman and it was in that position that he appeared in the famous 1970 VFL Grand Final loss to Carlton. Dean was particularly strong in the air and a good mark so when he crossed to South Melbourne in 1976 he played at centre half forward. On his debut for South Melbourne, in the opening round of the 1976 season, against Geelong at Lake Oval, Dean kicked eight goals. The following round he kicked another six goals and finished the year as South Melbourne's leading goal-kicker with 37. Dean managed 26 goals in 1977 but in his final years was used mostly away from the goals.
