= Con Britt =

Australian rules footballer (1947–2022)

Personal information
- Full name: Cornelius Britt
- Born: 10 August 1947
- Died: 23 July 2022 (aged 74)
- Original team: Golden Point
- Height: 179 cm (5 ft 10 in)
- Weight: 73 kg (161 lb)
- Position: Utility

Playing career^{1}
| Years | Club | Games (Goals) |
| 1966–73 | Collingwood | 110 (72) |
- ^{1} Playing statistics correct to the end of 1973.

Cornelius Britt (10 August 1947 – 23 July 2022) was an Australian rules footballer who played with Collingwood in the Victorian Football League (VFL).

Britt, who was recruited from Golden Point in the Ballarat Football League, was a utility who was regarded as being hard at the ball. He appeared in seven finals matches, including the 1970 VFL Grand Final loss to Carlton where he played as a half forward flanker and kicked a goal. He was also used as a centreman and ruck-rover during his career. He retired at the age of 26 in 1973.
