= Denis O'Callaghan (Australian rules footballer) =

Australian rules footballer and coach

Personal information
- Full name: Denis O'Callaghan
- Born: 7 February 1949 (age 77)
- Original team: Tiega
- Height: 178 cm (5 ft 10 in)
- Weight: 80 kg (176 lb)
- Position: Defender

Playing career^{1}
| Years | Club | Games (Goals) |
| 1968–73, 1975 | Collingwood | 129 (3) |
| 1976 | Coburg | 4 (1) |
| 1976 | Brunswick (VFA) | 5 (8) |
| Total | | 138 (12) |
- ^{1} Playing statistics correct to the end of 1975.

Denis O'Callaghan (born 7 February 1949) is a former Australian rules footballer who played with Collingwood in the Victorian Football League (VFL).

Recruited from Tiega, O'Callaghan played on the half back flank in the 1970 VFL Grand Final, which Collingwood lost. He was primarily seen in the back pockets and appeared in 10 finals during his time at the club. Such was the strength of the team that they made the finals in all but one season O'Callaghan was there, his first.

In 1976, O'Callaghan took over from John Dugdale as coach of Coburg in the Victorian Football Association (VFA). After just one season as captain-coach, he left Coburg and was replaced by Col Kinnear.
