= Lee Adamson =

Australian rules footballer

Personal information
- Born: 27 June 1946 (age 80)
- Original team: Greensborough (DVFL)

Playing career^{1}
Years	Club	Games (Goals)
1966–1973	Collingwood	96 (0)
- ^{1} Playing statistics correct to the end of 1973.

Lee Adamson (born 27 June 1946) is a former Australian rules footballer who played in the Victorian Football League (VFL).

From Greensborough, Adamson came through the Collingwood Football Club's under 19s before getting into the senior side. He made his debut in 1966 as a slender defender. Adamson played in the losing Collingwood side in the 1970 Grand Final against premiers Carlton. Adamson was accused of racially abusing Carlton player Syd Jackson, when Jackson was reported for striking Adamson. 22 years later, Jackson admitted no racial abuse was committed.

After he retired in 1973, Adamson was a support coach at Victoria Park.
