= Ross Dunne =

Australian rules footballer

Personal information
- Born: 25 February 1948 (age 78)
- Original team: North Heidelberg
- Debut: Round 18, 1967, Collingwood vs. St Kilda
- Height: 193 cm (6 ft 4 in)
- Weight: 82 kg (181 lb)

Playing career^{1}
Years	Club	Games (Goals)
1967–1978	Collingwood	213 (238)
- Upwey-Tecoma
- ^{1} Playing statistics correct to the end of 1978.

Ross 'Twiggy' Dunne (born 25 February 1948) is a former Australian rules footballer who played for the Collingwood Football Club in the Victorian Football League (VFL). He became famous for kicking the goal in the dying minutes of the 1977 VFL Grand Final to draw the game.

Nicknamed after the famous British model due to his slim frame, Dunne was a versatile, no-fuss player who spent much of his career at centre half-forward.

Dunne made his senior VFL debut in the final round of the 1967 VFL season against St Kilda at Moorabbin Oval, lining up on champion full back Bob Murray. The Magpies would lose by 47 points, and despite also being manhandled by Saints ruckman Carl Ditterich, Dunne performed admirably, kicking four goals straight. He was selected for the semi-final against eventual grand finalist Geelong, again kicking four goals in a 30-point defeat.

Dunne was considered among Collingwood's best players in the club's infamous loss to Carlton in the 1970 VFL Grand Final. What is not well known is that he had been suffering considerable mental trauma, as his father Frank had died on the Monday leading up to the game.

Dunne also played at least one season in the 1970s for Upwey-Tecoma in the Yarra Valley Mountain District Football League.
