= Jamie Cooper =

Australian rules footballer and painter

Personal information
- Full name: James Cooper
- Born: 14 June 1964 (age 62)
- Original team: Surrey Hills, Victoria
- Height: 180 cm (5 ft 11 in)
- Weight: 80 kg (176 lb)

Playing career^{1}
Years	Club	Games (Goals)
1984–1987	Fitzroy	26 (1)
- ^{1} Playing statistics correct to the end of 1987.

Jamie Cooper (born 14 June 1964) is an Australian painter and former Australian rules footballer in the Victorian Football League.

As a footballer, Cooper was recruited from Surrey Hills, Victoria. He made his senior VFL debut with the Fitzroy Football Club in 1984 and was a fringe player, playing 26 games over four seasons.

Cooper is best known for his painting career, and became internationally known for his large-scale historical "dream scene" sporting portraits, featuring a team's star players from throughout different eras, all depicted in their prime of their careers, interacting with each other in a single locker room or on one field. His first such paintings were commissioned for the Australian Football League's Carlton Football Club to celebrate its Team of the Century in 2001, and within the next decade he had painted similar dream scenes for most AFL clubs, as well as a mural commissioned by the league in 2008 to commemorate the 150th anniversary of the first game of Australian rules football, a piece called The Game That Made Australia. In 2008, he completed an uncommissioned dream scene of Major League Baseball's Philadelphia Phillies, which the club hung in its foyer and then, in 2011, eventually purchased outright. In the mid-2010s, he was commissioned by several European clubs, including Manchester City, Liverpool, Chelsea, Real Madrid, Sheffield Wednesday and Hull Kingston Rovers to paint dream scenes. Cooper is known for including subtle nods to the club's historical events and folklore in the finest background details of his dream scenes.
