= George Harris (Carlton president) =

Australian businessman and football executive

George Henry Harris (1922 – 26 November 2007) was an Australian businessman and sports executive who was best known in his role as President of the Carlton Football Club in the Victorian Football League (VFL) from 1964 to 1974 and again from 1978 to 1980, and is regarded as a highly significant figure in VFL-AFL history. He was also a central figure in the controversial dismissal of the Whitlam Labor government in 1975.

== From prisoner of war to prison dentist ==
Harris was born in St Kilda, Victoria. Although his war record lists him as being born on 30 August 1920, it is more likely he was born in 1922 and changed his date of birth so that he would be considered old enough to serve in the army, a common practice at the time. He served in the Australian military during World War II and was a prisoner of war at Changi prison. After the war Harris became a dentist at the now-defunct Pentridge Prison.

== President of Carlton ==
Harris became President of the Carlton Football Club in 1964 after the club had endured its worst on-field season at the time, finishing 10th on the ladder with only five wins. He immediately created a sensation when he headed the committee that enticed Melbourne's 1964 premiership captain Ron Barassi to join Carlton as captain-coach. This defection remains one of the major events in VFL-AFL history.

Under Harris's presidency, Barassi immediately established a new era of discipline at Princes Park and Carlton finished sixth in his first season at the club. In 1968, Barassi led Carlton to their first flag in 21 years. In 1970, Carlton saw Barassi lead the club to what many regard as its finest achievement - recovering from 44 points down at half-time to defeat Collingwood in the Grand Final.

After ending his first term as club president in 1974, Harris did not return to dentistry but instead pursued business interests. In mid-1975 Harris was implicated in the Whitlam government scandal that later became known as the Loans Affair. Harris had acted as a broker on behalf of the then Treasurer, Jim Cairns in an attempt to obtain a proposed $2 billion loan from some Middle Eastern countries. This scandal was a contributing factor in the Australian constitutional crisis of 1975.

Harris returned to the presidency of Carlton in 1978, and oversaw the close grand final victory over Collingwood the following year. He taunted Magpies' fans after that victory by declaring, "What's better than beating Collingwood by ten goals? Beating them by five points." Harris's second tenure as president was short-lived and he was ousted in a bitter board-level power struggle in February 1980.

== Later life and death ==
Harris suffered a stroke in 1991 which left him mute, and his health deteriorated over a period of several years.

Harris died peacefully in Heidelberg at the age of 84. His wife Jean had preceded him in 1999. He was survived by four children (Ken, Andrew, Christine and Robert) as well as eight grandchildren and four great-grandchildren.

The then Carlton president Richard Pratt, a long-time associate of Harris, paid tribute on behalf of the club saying:

With the passing of George Harris, a leviathan of the Carlton Football Club has sadly been lost. In the pantheon of Carlton's long and successful history, few men -- whether director, player, member or supporter -- can truly say that they gave more to Carlton than him. Everyone at Carlton extends their deepest sympathies to the Harris family on the passing of a man whose contributions to this club may never be surpassed.

== Bibliography ==
- Harris, George with Main, Jim (2006), George - by George. Changi, the Blues and Beyond, Bas Publishing, Melbourne, Victoria. ISBN 1920910670 (hbk.)

Preceded by L.J.M.Holmes	Carlton Football Club president 1965–1974	Succeeded by I.B.Rohrt
Preceded by I.B.Rohrt	Carlton Football Club president 1978–1979	Succeeded by I.W.Rice
