= Ron Barassi =

Australian rules footballer (1936–2023)

Ron Barassi AM
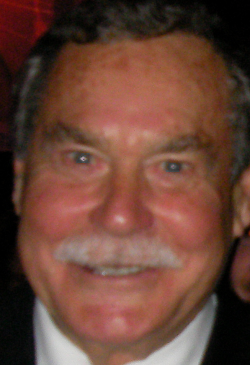
- Barassi in August 2008

Personal information
- Full name: Ronald Dale Barassi Jr.
- Born: 27 February 1936; Castlemaine, Victoria, Australia
- Died: 16 September 2023 (aged 87); Melbourne, Victoria, Australia
- Original team: Preston Scouts
- Height: 179 cm (5 ft 10 in)
- Weight: 87 kg (192 lb)
- Position: Midfielder

Playing career
Years	Club	Games (Goals)
1953–1964	Melbourne	204 (295)
1965–1969	Carlton	50 (35)
Total		254 (330)

Representative team honours
Years	Team	Games (Goals)
	Victoria	? (?)

Coaching career
Years	Club	Games (W–L–D)
1964	Melbourne	1 (1–0–0)
1965–1971	Carlton	147 (99–47–1)
1973–1980	North Melbourne	198 (130–65–3)
1981–1985	Melbourne	110 (33–77–0)
1993–1995	Sydney	59 (13–46–0)
Total		515 (276–235–4)

Career highlights
- Club: 6× VFL premiership player: 1955, 1956, 1957, 1959, 1960, 1964; 2× Keith 'Bluey' Truscott Medallist: 1961, 1964; 2× Melbourne leading goalkicker: 1958, 1959; Melbourne captain: 1960–1964; Melbourne Hall of Fame – Legend status; Melbourne Team of the Century; Representative: 2× National Football Carnival Championship: 1956, 1958; 3× All-Australian team: 1956, 1958, 1961; Victoria captain; Overall: Sport Australia Hall of Fame; AFL Team of the Century – rover; Australian Football Hall of Fame – Legend status; Australian Sports Medal: 2001; Coaching: 4× VFL premiership coach: 1968, 1970, 1975, 1977; VFL/AFL Italian Team of the Century; AFLCA Coaching Legend Award: 2010

Ronald Dale Barassi (27 February 1936 – 16 September 2023) was an Australian rules footballer, coach and media personality. Regarded as one of the greatest and most important figures in the history of the game, Barassi was the first player to be inaugurated into the Australian Football Hall of Fame as a "Legend", and he is one of four Australian rules footballers to be elevated to the same status in the Sport Australia Hall of Fame.

When Barassi was five years old, his father, Melbourne Football Club player Ron Barassi Sr., died in action at Tobruk during World War II. Barassi was determined to follow in his father's footsteps at Melbourne, and heavy lobbying by the club to recruit him resulted in the introduction of the father–son rule, still in use by the AFL today. Barassi subsequently lived with Norm Smith, Melbourne's then-coach and a former teammate of his father. Under Smith's mentorship, Barassi pioneered the ruck-rover position and appeared in six premiership-winning sides, two of which he captained.

In 1964, in what has been called "the most audacious signing in league history", Barassi left Melbourne for a lucrative contract at Carlton. Retiring from playing in 1969, he coached Carlton to two premierships, including a record-breaking grand final comeback in 1970 before what remains the largest crowd in football history; Barassi's famous half-time injunction to his men to play on from marks and handball at all costs came to be remembered as "the birth of modern football". Barassi retired from professional football in 1971, but he was lured back two years later to coach North Melbourne. In 1981, after leading the club to its first two premierships, he returned to an ailing Melbourne, where he initiated the "Irish experiment": the recruitment of Gaelic footballers into Australian rules. His stint at Melbourne, followed by another at the Sydney Swans in 1993–95, proved vital in rebuilding those clubs as viable members of the competition.

Barassi's coaching career was both successful and regarded by many as revolutionary, and his clean record and passion for the game earned him a place as a celebrity and popular culture figure in Australia. A prominent early campaigner for a national club-level competition, he is the namesake of the Barassi Line, which describes the regional split between football codes in Australia. He was named a Member of the Order of Australia in 1978, and in 1996 was selected in the AFL's Team of the Century as a ruck-rover. Following his death, Barassi was honoured with a state funeral.

== Early life ==
The only child of Ron Barassi, Sr., Barassi was born in the central Victorian town of Castlemaine on 27 February 1936. The following year, his father moved to Melbourne to play VFL football with the Melbourne Football Club. A pugnacious rover, Barassi's father was a reserve in the Demons' 1940 premiership team before leaving to serve with the army in North Africa, where he died in the Siege of Tobruk. The young Barassi spent his early years in Guildford, Victoria. He was educated at Castlemaine Tech and then at Preston and Footscray techs in Melbourne.

Barassi was a third-generation Italian Australian whose Swiss Italian ancestors migrated to Victoria during the gold rushes of the 1850s and 1860s. They settled areas such as Guildford, Castlemaine and Daylesford.

== Australian rules football career ==
Barassi unintentionally changed the game before he even took the field. After his father's death at Tobruk in 1941, a group of players and officials at the Melbourne Football Club pledged to support his widow, Elza, and her young son. As a teenager, Barassi was determined to follow in his father's footsteps at the Demons, but the zoning system of the day required him to play for either Collingwood or Carlton.

=== Father–son rule ===
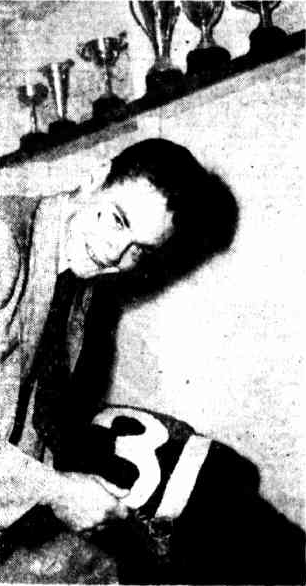
Barassi in 1953 with his father's trophies and guernsey

To ensure he played with the Demons, Melbourne went to the VFL and successfully lobbied for the creation of a father–son rule to allow clubs preferential recruiting access to the sons of players who have made a major past contribution to the team (50-game minimum at launch). When the time came for Barassi to be signed, Melbourne picked him from Preston Scouts in 1952 and he became only the second player signed under the new rule (after Harvey Dunn Jr). This rule, with some modifications and adapted to the drafting system created in 1986, endures to the present day in the AFL.

The club had gone to great lengths to recruit the young Barassi, and coach Norm Smith took him under his wing after his mother moved to Tasmania. Smith offered the 16-year-old use of his backyard bungalow. Looking back on the experience, Barassi believed that living with the man who was voted as the coach of the AFL's Team of the Century had a profound impact on his development. On his website, Barassi wrote that:

"Norm Smith loved his footy. That suited me fine. His ability with young people, his strength of character, his ethics and values, came into my life at the right time."

=== Melbourne years ===
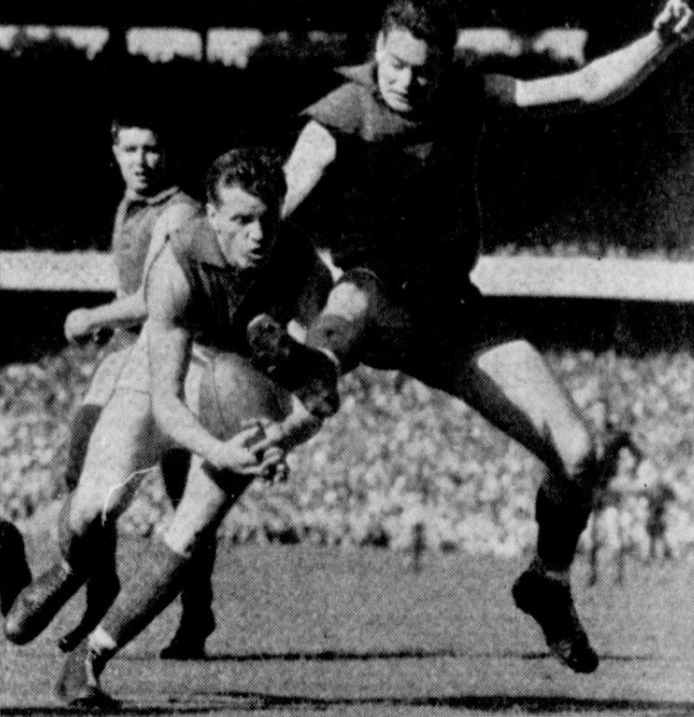
Barassi (right) and Footscray's Ted Whitten during a 1954 match

Melbourne Football Club was the dominant team of the 1950s. Under the coaching of Norm Smith, Barassi developed quickly. Barassi's first game was against Footscray in 1953 in which he was shirtfronted by Footscray's Charlie Sutton. Initially unsure as to Barassi's best position, Smith played him as a second ruckman in 1954 despite his lack of size for the position. Barassi played more as a second rover, and the term "ruck-rover" entered the football lexicon. Within a few years, most teams imitated this structure, which ultimately paved the way for a new style of quicker on-ball play.

Barassi soon proved himself as an influential footballer, and he was quickly handed leadership responsibilities. In 1957, he was appointed vice-captain, and he was made captain three years later. After losing the 1954 Grand Final to a more experienced Footscray football team by 51 points, the Demons dominated the VFL by winning three successive flags in 1955, 1956, and 1957, with the team at the time hailed as the best to ever play the game. The image of Barassi breaking a tackle in the 1957 Grand Final is captured in Jamie Cooper's painting The Game That Made Australia, commissioned by the AFL in 2008 to celebrate the 150th anniversary of the sport.

=== Carlton years ===
A resurgent Carlton gave him a dilemma in 1964. New president George Harris was desperate to have Barassi at Princes Park, and he was willing to offer a lucrative deal for the time – a three-year contract of A£9,000 (equivalent to $151,320 in 2023) plus bonuses — if Barassi would cross to Carlton as captain-coach. Carlton offered Barassi a chance to test his skills as coach with a professional wage which would help with his children's education.

Barassi joined Carlton in 1965. On his decision to leave Melbourne, Barassi said that "Inevitably with many decisions in life there will be a downside. It is regrettable but you have to get on with things", he said. "You have to ensure, as much as possible, that the decision you've made turns out right. Fortunately it worked out, and I'll be forever grateful to Carlton for the start they gave me in coaching."

Barassi's coaching at Carlton brought them from their lowest-ever VFL finish (at the time) to premiers only four years later. Drawing from his own experience under Norm Smith, Barassi forced his squad to become more disciplined and committed to the club—and their career. He preached and played a tough brand of football, and asked his charges to play a selfless, team-oriented style.

In 1968, he guided Carlton to its first premiership in 21 years. In mid-1969, he retired from playing, he had played one game and torn his hamstring, but continued as non-playing coach, ultimately going down to Richmond in the 1969 VFL Grand Final by 25 points; however, in the 1970 Grand Final, in front of the biggest-ever VFL crowd, he led Carlton to arguably football's most famous comeback by defeating Collingwood, who were leading by 44 points at half-time.

After the 1971 season, Barassi left the Blues to focus on his business career. Despite not having played football since 1969, he signed to play with Port Melbourne in the Victorian Football Association in 1972, but he played only four games before suffering a hamstring injury and retiring.

=== North Melbourne years ===
Barassi returned to coaching in 1973. With administrators Allen Aylett and Ron Joseph, he recruited a new batch of stars for North Melbourne. Proven champions were recruited from clubs throughout the country, including Malcolm Blight, Barry Cable, John Rantall, Barry Davis and Doug Wade.

North Melbourne won the wooden spoon in 1972, finishing last. However, in 1974, in just Barassi's second year of coaching the club, North Melbourne were to come runner-up in the 1974 grand final. Whereas Barassi had implemented a tough training regime in 1974, he modified this approach for the 1975 finals when he introduced lighter training sessions to keep his squad mentally-focused and not overtrained and exhausted. His strategy worked and they won the 1975 premiership.

North Melbourne went on to win another premiership in 1977, but they nearly squandered the flag as they gave up a late lead against Collingwood to create the second-ever drawn VFL grand final before coming back a week later to win the flag. In the drawn grand final, Barassi made major positional changes, including placing North Melbourne Team of the Century full-back and captain David Dench into the forward line, which sparked North Melbourne's comeback to get back in front until Ross Dunne kicked a late goal to draw the game. Within a week, Barassi had picked his side up from this disappointing setback to lead North to a memorable triumph.

=== Return to Melbourne ===
In 1981, Barassi returned to Melbourne to assist long-term under-19 coach Ray 'Slug' Jordon. The under-19s made three straight grand finals and won premierships in 1981 and 1983. Barassi laid some foundations for what would become a revitalised Melbourne side. "In the five years we were there I think we raised the level of the club quite substantially. Melbourne reached the preliminary final two years after we left, and the grand final the year after that. I felt we did some of the ground work".

Barassi started the "Irish experiment" at Melbourne, which started recruiting Gaelic footballers from Ireland and converting them to Australian rules footballers. He recruited the most famous of all, the 1991 Brownlow Medallist, Jim Stynes.

=== Sydney years ===
In 1993, Barassi returned to coaching for the Sydney Swans. This was seen as a coup for the AFL given Barassi's media skills and profile. In his three seasons in Sydney, he raised the profile of Australian rules football and the Sydney Swans in the rugby league–dominated city.

== Statistics ==
=== Playing statistics ===
Legend
G	Goals	K	Kicks	D	Disposals	T	Tackles
B	Behinds	H	Handballs	M	Marks
#	Played in that season's premiership team

Season	Team	No.	Games	Totals							Averages (per game)							Votes
Season	Team	No.	Games	G	B	K	H	D	M	T	G	B	K	H	D	M	T	Votes
1953	Melbourne	31	6	0	—N/a	—N/a	—N/a	—N/a	—N/a	—N/a	0.0	—N/a	—N/a	—N/a	—N/a	—N/a	—N/a	0
1954	Melbourne	31	14	12	—N/a	—N/a	—N/a	—N/a	—N/a	—N/a	0.9	—N/a	—N/a	—N/a	—N/a	—N/a	—N/a	0
1955^{#}	Melbourne	31	19	18	—N/a	—N/a	—N/a	—N/a	—N/a	—N/a	0.9	—N/a	—N/a	—N/a	—N/a	—N/a	—N/a	0
1956^{#}	Melbourne	31	19	27	—N/a	—N/a	—N/a	—N/a	—N/a	—N/a	1.4	—N/a	—N/a	—N/a	—N/a	—N/a	—N/a	13
1957^{#}	Melbourne	31	21	30	—N/a	—N/a	—N/a	—N/a	—N/a	—N/a	1.4	—N/a	—N/a	—N/a	—N/a	—N/a	—N/a	3
1958	Melbourne	31,2	18	44	—N/a	—N/a	—N/a	—N/a	—N/a	—N/a	2.4	—N/a	—N/a	—N/a	—N/a	—N/a	—N/a	5
1959^{#}	Melbourne	31	18	46	—N/a	—N/a	—N/a	—N/a	—N/a	—N/a	2.6	—N/a	—N/a	—N/a	—N/a	—N/a	—N/a	1
1960^{#}	Melbourne	31	18	21	—N/a	—N/a	—N/a	—N/a	—N/a	—N/a	1.2	—N/a	—N/a	—N/a	—N/a	—N/a	—N/a	3
1961	Melbourne	31	19	19	—N/a	—N/a	—N/a	—N/a	—N/a	—N/a	1.0	—N/a	—N/a	—N/a	—N/a	—N/a	—N/a	10
1962	Melbourne	31	17	21	—N/a	—N/a	—N/a	—N/a	—N/a	—N/a	1.2	—N/a	—N/a	—N/a	—N/a	—N/a	—N/a	6
1963	Melbourne	31	17	32	—N/a	—N/a	—N/a	—N/a	—N/a	—N/a	1.9	—N/a	—N/a	—N/a	—N/a	—N/a	—N/a	10
1964^{#}	Melbourne	31	17	25	—N/a	—N/a	—N/a	—N/a	—N/a	—N/a	1.4	—N/a	—N/a	—N/a	—N/a	—N/a	—N/a	10
1965	Carlton	31	11	6	13	201	81	282	61	—N/a	0.5	1.2	18.3	7.4	25.6	5.5	—N/a	5
1966	Carlton	31	8	11	6	149	54	203	42	—N/a	1.4	0.8	18.6	6.8	25.4	5.3	—N/a	3
1967	Carlton	31	20	14	21	301	168	469	77	—N/a	0.8	1.1	15.1	8.4	23.5	3.9	—N/a	3
1968	Carlton	31	10	3	8	118	47	165	32	—N/a	0.3	0.8	11.8	4.7	16.5	3.2	—N/a	0
1969	Carlton	31	1	0	3	8	3	11	3	—N/a	0.0	3.0	8.0	3.0	11.0	3.0	—N/a	0
Career			254	330	51	777	353	1130	215	—N/a	1.3	1.0	15.5	7.1	22.6	4.3	—N/a	72

=== Coaching statistics ===
Legend
W	Wins	L	Losses	D	Draws	W%	Winning percentage	LP	Ladder position	LT	League teams

Season	Team	Games	W	L	D	W %	LP	LT
1964	Melbourne	1	1	0	0	100.0%	—N/a	12
1965	Carlton	18	10	8	0	55.6%	6	12
1966	Carlton	18	10	8	0	55.6%	6	12
1967	Carlton	20	14	5	1	72.5%	2	12
1968^{#}	Carlton	22	17	5	0	77.3%	2	12
1969	Carlton	22	16	6	0	72.7%	2	12
1970^{#}	Carlton	25	18	7	0	72.0%	2	12
1971	Carlton	22	14	8	0	63.6%	5	12
1973	North Melbourne	22	11	10	1	52.3%	6	12
1974	North Melbourne	26	18	8	0	69.2%	2	12
1975^{#}	North Melbourne	26	17	9	0	65.4%	3	12
1976	North Melbourne	25	17	8	0	68.0%	3	12
1977^{#}	North Melbourne	26	18	7	1	71.2%	3	12
1978	North Melbourne	25	17	8	0	68.0%	1	12
1979	North Melbourne	25	18	7	0	72.0%	2	12
1980	North Melbourne	23	14	8	1	63.0%	6	12
1981	Melbourne	22	1	21	0	4.6%	12	12
1982	Melbourne	22	8	14	0	36.4%	8	12
1983	Melbourne	22	9	13	0	40.9%	8	12
1984	Melbourne	22	9	13	0	40.9%	9	12
1985	Melbourne	22	6	16	0	27.3%	11	12
1993	Sydney	15	1	14	0	6.7%	15	15
1994	Sydney	22	4	18	0	18.2%	15	15
1995	Sydney	22	8	14	0	36.4%	12	16
Career totals		515	276	235	4	53.4%		

== Select career highlights ==
- 6× Melbourne premiership player 1955, 1956, 1957, 1959, 1960, 1964.
- Melbourne leading goalkicker 1958 (tied), 1959.
- Melbourne Captain 1960–1964.
- Melbourne Best and Fairest 1961, 1964.
- All-Australian 1956, 1958, 1961.
- Playing coach representing Australia in "The Galahs" Australian Football World Tour 1968.
- Carlton premiership coach 1968, 1970.
- North Melbourne premiership coach 1975, 1977.
- Sport Australia Hall of Fame (inducted in 1987 and elevated to ‘Legend of Australian Sport’ in 2006).
- Australian Football Hall of Fame (inducted in 1996 and granted Legend status).
- VFL/AFL Team of the Century 1996.
- Sport Australia Hall of Fame 2006.
- Melbournian of the Year 2006.
- VFL/AFL Italian Team of the Century (coach) 2007.

== Personal life ==
On 4 March 1957, Barassi married Nancy Kellett, whom he had met at work four years earlier. They settled in the eastern suburbs of Melbourne, at Heathmont, and had three children between 1960 and 1964. The couple separated in 1975 and Barassi married Cherryl Copeland (born in St Kilda, Melbourne) in 1981. They were married until his death in 2023. Both Ron and Cherryl were active supporters of the voluntary assisted dying movement.

During his coaching career at North Melbourne he survived a car crash, which caused life-threatening injuries and resulted in the loss of his spleen. His passenger, former St Kilda player and Brownlow medallist Neil Roberts, was also hurt. Barassi used a motorised buggy and a wheelchair for a short time. Despite this setback, he attended training nights at Arden Street and could be seen directing players with assistants.

Barassi's first trip overseas occurred in 1961. He later travelled much of the world. In 1967, in New York City during the Australian Football World Tour, Barassi was involved in a fight in which detective Brendan Tumelty broke Barassi's nose and both were sent to the same hospital. They were friends ever since.

Barassi moved to the suburb of St Kilda in the late 1970s and lived there until his death.

Barassi was a passionate chess player, playing many games of classical chess in the late 1970s over the phone with Brent Crosswell—a player whom Barassi was actively coaching—often for more than four hours at a time and lasting 50–60 moves per game. In a newspaper article, Crosswell humorously described how Barassi would psychologically break Crosswell down in over-the-board games by neglecting to bring him food or drinks and that “he would never provide chairs bearing any logical relationship to the table on which the chess set was placed”.

For many years, Barassi owned the Mountain View Hotel at 70 Bridge Road in Richmond. He sold it for $1.6 million in 2000.

For his 70th birthday he did a trek of the Kokoda Trail in Papua New Guinea.

On 28 February 2008, Barassi launched and signed his book Barassi, focusing on his personal life and scrapbook memoirs.

On New Year's Eve 2008, Barassi was assaulted when he went to the aid of a young woman in St Kilda. Barassi, dining with friends, saw a woman punched to the ground around 12.30 am. In January 2012, Barassi suffered a bike accident, cracking three ribs. In September that year, aged 76, he went on to crew a yacht at Hamilton Island Yacht Racing Week with his friend John Bertrand. For his brave defence of the woman on New Year's Eve 2008, Barassi received a bravery award in 2012 and a commendation for brave conduct in 2013.

On 16 September 2023, Barassi died following complications from a fall. He was 87.

== Cultural impact and legacy ==
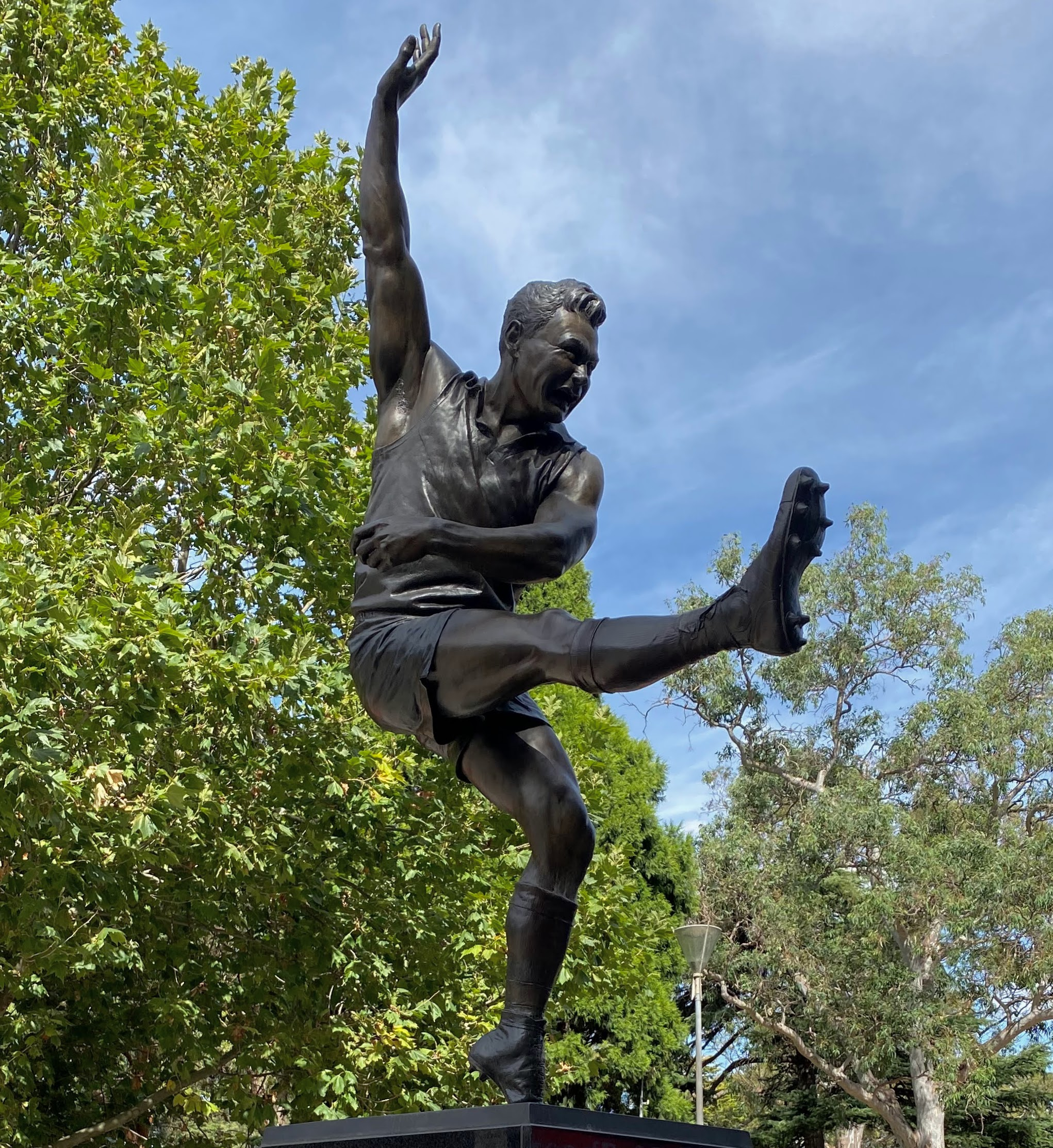
Statue of Barassi at the Parade of Champions, Melbourne Cricket Ground

After retiring from coaching, Barassi remained a prominent Australian rules football celebrity and a figure of popular culture.

In 1996, he became an inaugural inductee in the Australian Football Hall of Fame, one of few former greats to be bestowed the honour of the "Legend" category. He is also one of only three Australian rules footballers in the Sport Australia Hall of Fame, alongside Leigh Matthews and Ted Whitten.

Barassi was involved in grassroots football development and was an advocate for the development of the game internationally, particularly in South Africa. Reflecting this, Barassi lent his name to the Barassi International Australian Football Youth Tournament.

Barassi was a supporter of Australia becoming a republic.

Barassi was one of the last runners in the Queen's Baton Relay for the 2006 Commonwealth Games, being held in Melbourne, Australia, from 15 to 26 March. His section of the relay, run on 15 March, involved taking the baton from a series of pontoons in the middle of the Yarra River onto shore. It was handed to him by David Neitz, captain of the Melbourne Football Club (the team with which Barassi was long associated). This was accomplished by having Barassi walk on a pontoon that was submerged just beneath the surface of the water, giving the impression that Barassi was "walking on water".

Barassi is the namesake of the Barassi Line, a concept originated by scholar Ian Turner to describe the geographical divide in Australia between Australian rules football and the two rugby codes. The line is imagined to intersect the border towns of Corowa and Wahgunyah, where, in 2014, Barassi attended the unveiling of a plaque commemorating the Barassi Line.

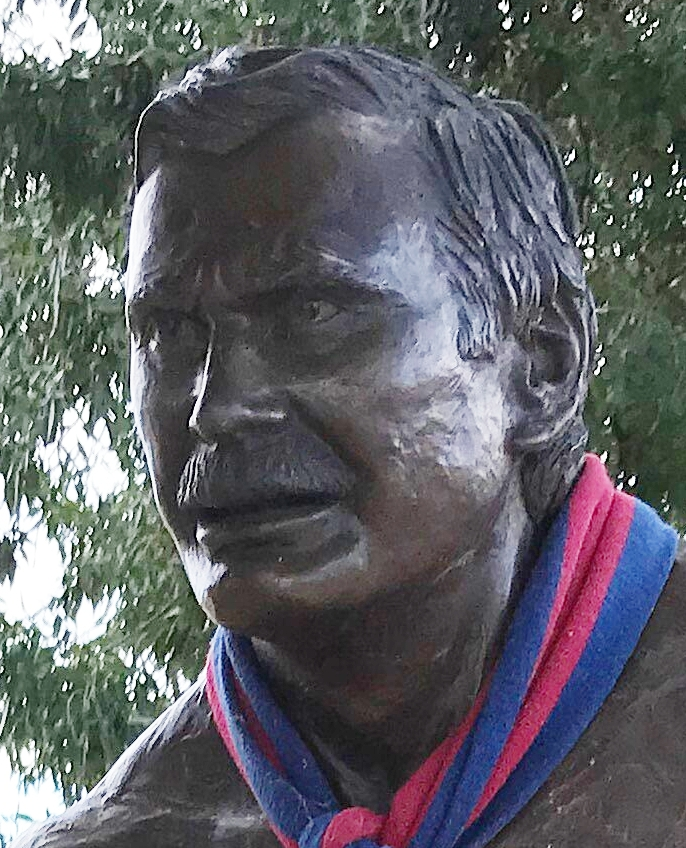
Barassi bust unveiled at Guildford in 2016 for his 80th birthday

Robert Helpmann's 1964 ballet The Display includes a lengthy football sequence for which Helpmann recruited Barassi to coach the male dancers in Australian rules. Barassi wrote the introduction to Philip Hodgins' 1990 poetry collection A Kick of the Footy. The frontman of satirical Melbourne band TISM went under the pseudonym Ron Hitler-Barassi. Barassi disliked the reference, saying "My father was killed by Hitler's men in Tobruk so you can imagine my displeasure." Artist Lewis Miller won the 2000 "Sporting Archibald" for his portrait of Barassi, which was acquired by the National Portrait Gallery in Canberra. Barassi has appeared in the Specky Magee books. In 2015, Barassi collaborated with singer-songwriter Tex Perkins on the song "One Minute's Silence", a tribute to the diggers who died at Gallipoli. He was mentioned several times in episodes of the television show Kingswood Country. He was one of the first footballers to have his own football clinic on television and during the 1960s. He also launched his popular "Ron Barassi" footy boots.

In September 2003, a bronze statue depicting Barassi kicking based on a famous photograph was unveiled at the Melbourne Cricket Ground.

After the second week of the 2006 AFL Finals, with the four remaining teams all being non-Victorian, and with Victorians reeling from their recent weakness, Barassi controversially called for an inquiry to unearth the reason Victoria was trailing in the AFL despite the state giving birth to the national competition.

In late 2006, he became a Sport Australia Hall of Fame member.

The best player in the Under-17 International Rules Series is awarded the Ron Barassi Medal.

Barassi was the subject of a series 2 episode of Who Do You Think You Are?.

In 2012, Australian playwright Tee O'Neill adapted Barassi's life into a theatrical performance. The play script was published by Currency Press.

A bronze bust of Barassi was unveiled in his hometown of Guildford to celebrate his 80th birthday on 27 February 2016 .

== Honours and awards ==
Member of the Order of Australia (AM)	6 June 1978, "in recognition of service to the sport of Australian Rules football".
Commendation for Brave Conduct	25 March 2013 – Bravery Honours
Australian Sports Medal	24 October 2000

== Publications ==
- Ron Barassi: Chronicling His Football Career Using His Scrapbooks and Memorabilia (2008). ISBN 9780980301564. OCLC 246200694. Icons of Australian Sport series.
- Barassi: The Biography (2010). ISBN 9781741752120. OCLC 670391075.
- Wisdom: Life Lessons from an Australian Legend (2011). ISBN 9781742378756. OCLC 755942966.
