= Adrian Gallagher =

Australian rules footballer

Personal information
- Born: 12 May 1946 (age 80)
- Original team: Yarram
- Debut: Round 6, 1964, Carlton vs. St Kilda, at Junction Oval
- Height: 179 cm (5 ft 10 in)
- Weight: 72 kg (159 lb)

Playing career^{1}
Years	Club	Games (Goals)
1964–1972	Carlton	165 (236)
1973–1975	Footscray	54 (38)
1976	North Melbourne	1 (0)
Total		220 (274)
- ^{1} Playing statistics correct to the end of 1976.

Career highlights
- 1963 Under 19s Best & Fairest Award; 1970 Robert Reynolds Memorial Trophy -Best & Fairest Award; 1971 Arthur Reyment Memorial Trophy -2nd Best & Fairest; Carlton Premiership Player 1968, 1970, 1972; Carlton Leading Goalkicker 1966

Adrian Lindsay Gallagher (born 12 May 1946) is a former Australian rules footballer in the Victorian Football League.

== Cricket ==
He was also an outstanding cricketer in his youth and received many offers to play in England, but preferred to stay in Melbourne over the Australian winter and play football for Carlton.

Gallagher played 34 first eleven games of Melbourne District cricket for the Carlton Cricket Club between 1966 and 1971.

== Football ==
Widely known as "Gags", he also went by the nickname "Golly" before he started to lose his mop of curly hair.

=== Carlton (under 19s) ===
Best and fairest player for the Carlton Under 19 team in 1963, he kicked one goal in the team's Grand Final win against the Essendon Under 19s, at Maddingley Park, in Bacchus Marsh, on 12 October 1963.

=== Carlton (First XVIII) ===
Gallagher made his debut for the Carlton First XVIII on 23 May 1964 (round 6), against St Kilda at the Junction Oval. He was a tenacious, courageous left-footer, renowned for fearlessly burrowing into dense packs and coming out with the ball.

=== Footscray ===
Under the short-lived VFL's "10-year rule", which allowed players with ten years' service at one club to move to another club without a clearance, Gallagher left Carlton and moved to Footscray at the beginning of the 1973 season.

=== North Melbourne ===
In 1976 he moved to North Melbourne, but only played one game
