= 1948 VFL grand final =

Grand final and grand final replay of the 1948 Victorian Football League season

1948 VFL Grand Final

Essendon	Melbourne
7.27 (69)	10.9 (69)
	1	2	3	4
Ess	0.6	2.15	6.21	7.27
Mel	3.0	4.5	6.8	10.9
- Date: 2 October 1948
- Stadium: Melbourne Cricket Ground
- Attendance: 86,198

1948 VFL Grand Final

Essendon	Melbourne
7.8 (50)	13.11 (89)
	1	2	3	4
Ess	0.3	5.5	6.6	7.8
Mel	6.2	9.3	11.6	13.11
- Date: 9 October 1948 (Replay)
- Stadium: Melbourne Cricket Ground
- Attendance: 52,226

The 1948 VFL grand final and grand final replay were a pair of Australian rules football games contested between the Melbourne Football Club and Essendon Football Club, held at the Melbourne Cricket Ground in October 1948. They were the 50th and 51st grand finals of the Victorian Football League, staged to determine the premiers for the 1948 VFL season.

The grand final match, attended by 86,198 spectators on 2 October 1948, ended in a draw, the first time that a VFL grand final resulted in a draw. A replay was staged on 9 October 1948, attended by 52,226 spectators, in which Melbourne easily defeated Essendon by 39 points, marking that club's sixth VFL premiership.

== Grand final ==
=== Lead-up ===
Essendon had been the dominant-performing club in 1948, finishing as minor premiers with a 16–2–1 record and a 14-point lead over its nearest rivals. Melbourne finished second with a 13–6 record, above Collingwood on percentage and one win ahead of Footscray in fourth. Essendon 13.16 (94) defeated Melbourne 8.10 (58) in the second semi-final to progress to the grand final; Melbourne then faced Collingwood in the preliminary final, and they won 25.16 (166) d. 15.11 (101) to qualify. Entering the grand final, Essendon had won twelve games in a row.

Melbourne had sprung a series of surprise selections during the 1948 finals series. After he had spent most of the season as playing coach of the reserves team, 33-year-old forward Jack Mueller was recalled for the preliminary final against Collingwood and kicked eight goals. Centre half-back Alan McGowan was reported during the preliminary final and suspended; his place in the side was taken by leading amateur player and University Blacks captain Denis Cordner – and brother of club captain Don Cordner – whose only previous senior game VFL game had occurred while on leave from the navy in 1943. Essendon made one change to its winning second semi-final team, veteran Wally Buttsworth returning from injury, Wally May dropped to the bench as reserve, and Harry Equid dropped to emergency. Shortly before the match began, Melbourne lost Bob McKenzie to injury; emergency Doug Heywood – also now a University Blacks amateur player whose first VFL game for the season had been the preliminary final – came into the team to replace him.

=== First quarter ===
The game opened with several rough encounters, Essendon attacked first and had a couple of behinds on the board before Melbourne kicked the game's first goal with a kick over Jack Mueller's head which was crumbed by Eddie Craddock. Soon after, Melbourne kicked its second goal, when Norm Smith received a free kick for a high fend-off from Perc Bushby at the goal face. Essendon continued to attack but were repeatedly repelled, with late selection Denis Cordner playing a strong marking game at centre half-back for Melbourne. Mueller scored his first goal for the game later in the quarter, and at this stage Melbourne led by 15 points. Essendon continued attacking, but failed to score a goal for the quarter. The score at quarter time was Melbourne 3.0 (18), Essendon 0.6 (6).

Essendon ultimately trailed by 12 points at quarter time, despite six scoring shots to three kicking with the aid of the breeze. Essendon put substantial defensive focus into countering Mueller's effectiveness, with usual ruck-rover Perc Bushby serving as his main defender, and Melbourne had adopted a strategy of handball and wide play along the wings and flanks. Bob McClure was strong in both the ruck and defense for Essendon through the quarter.

=== Second quarter ===
Essendon scored the first behind of the second quarter, before Melbourne rebounded and launched a sustained period of attack, in large part from a purple patch by centreman George Bickford. Over repeated forward entries, Melbourne peppered the goals for five successive behinds and several other shots missing out of bounds, before Mueller kicked his second goal from a set shot after 13 minutes to extend Melbourne's advantage to 22 points: 4.5 (29) leading 0.7 (7). The game throughout this period was somewhat of an arm wrestle, and through the early period it was Melbourne's stronger marking which gave it the advantage.

Essendon finally kicked its first goal of the game after roughly twenty minutes had elapsed, Bill Hutchison scoring with a snap shot; and as Essendon's marked more strongly and captain-coach Dick Reynolds began to dominate in the midfield over the following ten minutes, the Bombers mounted a comeback. However, over this period of dominance, Essendon managed only one more goal, to Keith Rawle; Essendon's other advances resulted in eight behinds – five of them consecutively to end the half. At half time, Melbourne led by only two points: 4.5 (29) leading 2.15 (27).

=== Third quarter ===
The tight struggle continued into the third quarter. Early in the third quarter, Bill Brittingham (Essendon) kicked a goal from a set shot to give Essendon a five point lead, its first lead since the opening quarter. Melbourne responded quickly, Mueller kicking two goals in quick succession to regain a six point lead for Melbourne. Soon afterwards, Essendon levelled the scores again with a goal from a 50yd running kick from Bob Bradley. In the latter part of the quarter, both clubs had several chances to attack; but it was Essendon, particularly after shifting Perc Bushby into the ruck, who began to control play. Two goals late in the quarter to Essendon – Hutchison from a set shot, followed by Rawle from general play – gave Essendon its game-high 13-point lead at three quarter time. Essendon 6.21 (57) led Melbourne 6.8 (44).

=== Final quarter ===
Essendon began strongly with two behinds, before Mueller kicked Melbourne's opening goal of the final quarter to narrow the margin to nine points. Both teams attacked strongly over the following minutes, missing with several shots at goal. Melbourne was next to score a goal, Lance Arnold kicking his first to reduce the margin to six points. Brittingham responded with his second from a broken marking contest. With the game entering time-on, Essendon led by twelve points.

Melbourne then kicked two goals in quick succession to level the scores: Mueller kicking his sixth from a set shot, and Adrian Dullard marking and kicking his first for the game. With scores level, it was Melbourne who finished the game in attack and missed two opportunities to break the tie: Norm Smith marked and took a 45m running shot in the final minute which went out of bounds; and from the ensuing throw-in, he gained clean possession then fumbled due to interference from team-mate Don Cordner. The bell rang and the game was drawn, Essendon 7.27 (69) vs Melbourne 10.9 (69).

=== Review ===
According to the Sporting Globe newspaper, Melbourne forward Norm Smith was the best player on the ground. Although he himself kicked only one goal, he regularly launched the Melbourne attacks and assisted on many of Mueller's six goals. Dick Reynolds was best for Essendon, his strong midfield play bringing the Bombers back into the game at key times. Reflecting on the game in his column for The Argus, Reynolds heralded Melbourne ruckman Don Cordner as the best on ground, his ruckwork and defensive work proving to be Essendon's biggest challenge on the day.

Other players considered among the best for Melbourne were rover Alby Rodda and amateur centre half-back Denis Cordner – although the latter tired as the game went on. Bob McClure was Essendon's top key position player, and half-forward Ted Leehane became prominent once he broke away from Denis Cordner in the second half. Mueller's six goals proved important for Melbourne, and Essendon was criticised for using the too-slow Perc Bushby to defend him.

Essendon's inaccurate goalkicking proved to be its downfall, failing to win despite registering fifteen more scoring shots than Melbourne. As of 2023, this remains an equal record for any VFL/AFL game. The Age writer Percy Beames was particularly scathing of the Bombers' forward play, noting that "position play was completely ignored, and forward work resulted in a hopeless jumble of self-seeking glorification". It was the second straight year that the Bombers were left to lament their poor kicking in the grand final, having lost 11.19 (85) to 13.8 (86) in 1947.

Overall, scribes considered general play to have been relatively even, despite Essendon's advantage in scoring shots, and considered that Melbourne's structure and teamwork was superior to Essendon's.

=== Scorecard ===
Grand final
Saturday, 2 October (2:15 pm)	Essendon	drew with	Melbourne	Melbourne Cricket Ground (crowd: 86,198)
0.6 (6); 2.15 (27); 6.21 (57); 7.27 (69)	Q1; Q2; Q3; Final	3.0 (18); 4.5 (29); 6.8 (44); 10.9 (69)	Umpires: Jack McMurray, Jr.
Brittingham, Hutchison, Rawle 2 Bradley 1	Goals	6 Mueller; 1 Arnold, Craddock, Dullard, Smith
D. Reynolds, McCLure, McDonald, H. Lambert, C. Lambert, Leehane	Best	Rodda, Smith, Collins, Mueller, Bickford, McGrath

== Grand final replay ==
=== Lead-up ===
Both teams made changes to their grand final teams. Melbourne brought back Bob McKenzie, who had been forced out on the morning of the grand final with injury, and dropped Doug Heywood back to emergency. Essendon made three published changes: Wally May, Les Gardiner and Harry Equid all came into the starting 18 for Bob Syme (who was dropped to reserve), Doug Bigelow (omitted from the 20) and Harold Lambert (injured). On the morning of the match, Essendon lost Wally Buttsworth after a training incident caused a recurrence of the knee injury which had kept him out of the semi-final; and Bob Syme returned to the starting 18 to replace him, and emergency Ron McEwin stripped as reserve.

Essendon won the coin toss for choice of dressing rooms, choosing Melbourne's larger home rooms and forcing Melbourne to use the visitors' rooms. The replay was played in wet conditions, and a substantially smaller crowd of 52,226 turned out to the match.

=== Grand final replay teams ===
Essendon
B:	Chris Lambert	Cec Ruddell	Bob McClure
HB:	Les Gardiner	Wally May	Norm McDonald
C:	Bob Bradley	Albert Harper	George Hassell
HF:	Jack Jones	Ted Leehane	Dick Reynolds (c)
F:	Harry Equid	Bill Brittingham	Keith Rawle
Foll:	Bob Syme	Perc Bushby	Bill Hutchison
Res:	Vic Fisher	Ron McEwin	
Coach:	Dick Reynolds		

Melbourne
B:	Billy Deans	Shane McGrath	Stan Rule
HB:	Geoff Collins	Denis Cordner	Col McLean
C:	Len Dockett	George Bickford	Max Spittle
HF:	Noel McMahen	Lance Arnold	Bob McKenzie
F:	Jack Mueller	Norm Smith	Eddie Craddock
Foll:	Don Cordner (c)	Adrian Dullard	Alby Rodda
Res:	Gordon Bowman	Edward Jackson	
Coach:	"Checker" Hughes		

Umpire – Jack McMurray

=== Grand final replay team changes ===
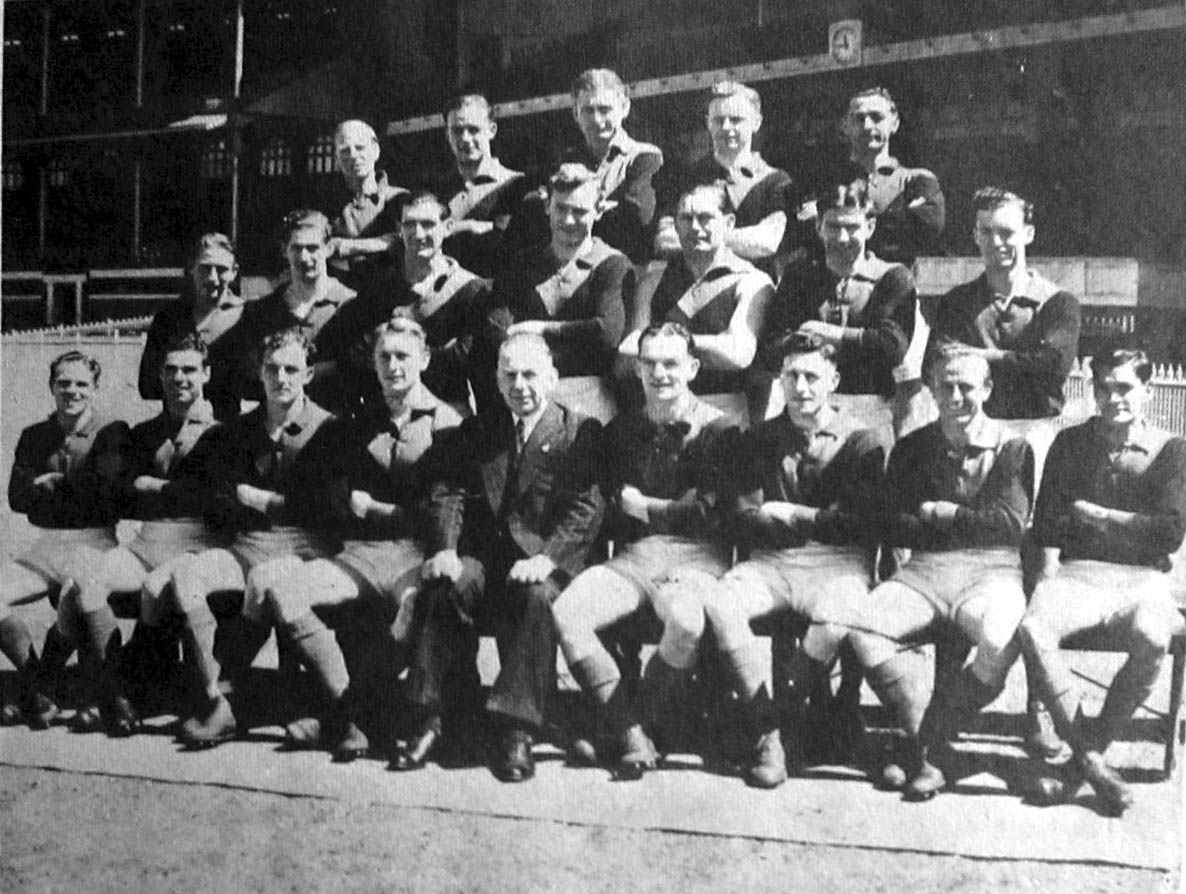
Melbourne FC team, premiers

Melbourne

In

- Bob McKenzie

Out

- Doug Heywood

Essendon

In

- Harry Equid
- Les Gardiner
- Ron McEwin

Out

- Doug Bigelow
- Wally Buttsworth
- Harold Lambert

=== First quarter ===
The frantic opening minutes saw Essendon kick the first two behinds of the game, before Melbourne began to dominate play, winning in the ruck, winning the physical contests, and preventing Essendon from winning through the centreline. Adrian Dullard kicked the opening goal from a set shot after five minutes of play. Three more goals quickly followed over a four-minute period, to Jack Mueller, Noel McMahen, and Mueller again. As in the first grand final, Dick Reynolds went to the ruck to try to turn the game, but Melbourne continued to attack and Lance Arnold scored their fifth goal from a snap shot out the back of a pack. Mueller kicked his third goal for the quarter, and the quarter time score showed Melbourne 6.2 (38) leading Essendon 0.3 (3) by 35 points.

=== Second quarter ===
Essendon's position improved through the second quarter, and Bill Hutchison kicked their opening goal early in the quarter; but Melbourne responded quickly with goals to George Bickford and Arnold, extending the margin to a game-high 40 points. Essendon responded with the next four goals: led by Perc Bushby in the ruck, Essendon kicked the next two goals, first to Jack Jones, then Bill Brittingham from a mark in the goal square; two more goals to Bob Syme and Brittingham following, narrowing the margin to 16 points and giving Essendon a chance. There was a short incident when Mueller dropped Essendon defender Norm McDonald and Essendon's Cec Ruddell remonstrated, and soon afterwards Norm Smith kicked Melbourne's ninth goal. At half time Melbourne 9.3 (57) led Essendon 5.5 (35) by 22 points.

=== Third quarter ===
A positional chance saw Essendon forward Brittingham moved to centre half-back with good success, and Reynolds kicked the first goal for the quarter to Essendon to narrow the margin to only 16 points – it having previously been as high as 40. However, this was as close as Essendon could get. Mueller kicked his fifth goal shortly afterwards, then after ten minutes of wild play, Alby Rodda kicked a goal from a set shot. Melbourne's defense offered Essendon few other chances, and at three quarter time the Demons held a five goal lead, Melbourne 11.6 (72) vs Essendon 6.6 (42).

=== Final quarter ===
A defensive, rough, wet-weather opening to the final quarter yielded little in the way of scoring, allowing Melbourne to comfortably defend its five goal lead. Goals were eventually scored by Mueller (his sixth for the game) for Melbourne, Syme for Essendon and Rodda for Melbourne before the game was brought to a close. Melbourne 13.11 (89) ultimately defeated Essendon 7.8 (50) by 39 points.

=== Review ===
Chief football writers Hector de Lacy of The Sporting Globe and Alf Brown of The Herald both considered Norm Smith the best on ground for his work in leading the Melbourne forward line, with The Herald calling it one of the greatest games of his career.

Other players highlighted for their efforts were Melbourne full-forward Jack Mueller and centre half-forward Lance Arnold, centreman George Bickford and wingman Max Spittle. Essendon's best were Bob McClure and Norm McDonald.

=== Scorecard ===
Grand final replay
Saturday, 9 October (2:15 pm)	Essendon	def. by	Melbourne	Melbourne Cricket Ground (crowd: 52,226)
0.3 (3); 5.5 (35); 6.6 (42); 7.8 (50)	Q1; Q2; Q3; Final	6.2 (38); 9.3 (57); 11.6 (72); 13.11 (89)	Umpires: Jack McMurray, Jr.
Brittingham, Syme 2 Hutchison, Jones, Reynolds 1	Goals	6 Mueller; 2 Arnold, Rodda; 1 Dullard, McMahen, Smith
McDonald, McClure, Bushby, Syme, Hassell, C. Lambert	Best	Mueller, Smith, McGrath, Spittle, Bickford, Arnold
Ruddell, for elbowing Mueller in the second quarter Lambert, for hacking Craddock in the second quarter	Reports

== See also ==
- 1948 VFL season

Other grand finals drawn, requiring a replay

- 1977 VFL grand final
- 2010 AFL Grand Final

Other grand finals between Essendon and Melbourne

- 1957 VFL grand final
- 1959 VFL grand final
- 2000 AFL Grand Final
