= 1950 VFL grand final =

Grand final of the 1950 Victorian Football League season

1950 VFL Grand Final

Essendon	North Melbourne
13.14 (92)	7.12 (54)
	1	2	3	4
ESS	7.3 (45)	7.6 (48)	10.11 (71)	13.14 (92)
NM	4.0 (24)	5.5 (35)	7.9 (51)	7.12 (54)
- Date: 23 September 1950
- Stadium: Melbourne Cricket Ground
- Attendance: 85,869

The 1950 VFL Grand Final was an Australian rules football game contested between the Essendon Football Club and North Melbourne Football Club, held at the Melbourne Cricket Ground on 23 September 1950. It was the 53rd annual Grand Final of the Victorian Football League, staged to determine the premiers for the 1950 VFL season. The match, attended by 85,869 spectators (Note: This is the official attendance. Some other sources provide an attendance number of 87,601) , was won by Essendon by 38 points, marking that club's tenth premiership victory.

== Background ==
This was North Melbourne's first-ever VFL Grand Final, while Essendon were competing in their fifth successive premiership decider. They were the reigning premiers, having defeated Carlton in the 1949 VFL Grand Final. Essendon's victory sent the retiring Dick Reynolds out in style, although he would come out of retirement for one final game in 1951.

== Teams ==
Essendon	N. Melbourne

Essendon
B:	Les Gardiner	Bill Brittingham	Wally May
HB:	Harold Lambert	Roy McConnell	Norm McDonald
C:	Chris Lambert	Alan Dale	Jack Collins
HF:	Jack Jones	Bill Snell	Albert Harper
F:	Dick Reynolds (c)	John Coleman	Ron McEwin
Foll:	Bob McClure	Bob Syme	Bill Hutchison
Res:	Ted Leehane	Noel Allanson	
Coach:	Dick Reynolds		

North Melbourne
B:	Pat Kelly	Jock McCorkell	John Reeves
HB:	Ted Jarrard	Reg Ryan	Les Reeves
C:	Keith McKenzie	Kevin Dynon	Les Mogg
HF:	Gerald Marchesi	Frank Jeeves	Don Condon
F:	Bob Brooker	Jock Spencer	Tim Robb
Foll:	Col Thornton	Les Foote (c)	Jim Malone
Res:	Vic Lawrence	Jack Hedley	
Coach:	Wally Carter		

- Umpire – Jack McMurray, Jr.

== Statistics ==
=== Goalkickers ===
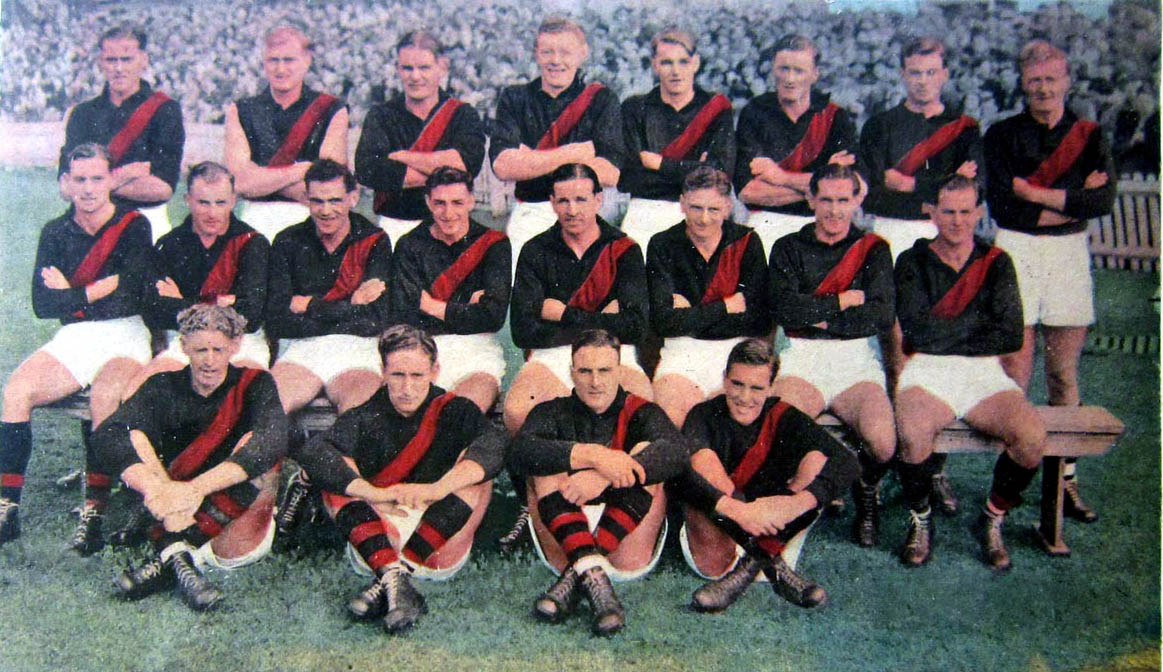
Essendon team photo, 1950. BACK (L–R): Jones, May, Bigelow, McClure, McConnell, Snell, Coleman, Brittingham. CENTRE (L–R): Allanson, C. Lambert, McDonald, McEwin, Reynolds (capt/coach), Hutchison, Gardiner, Hassell. FRONT (L–R): Leehane, Bradley, H. Lambert, Tate.

Essendon

- Coleman 4
- Reynolds 2
- Syme 2
- Dale 1
- Harper 1
- Hutchison 1
- McEwin 1
- Snell 1

North Melbourne

- Spencer 3
- Robb 2
- Brooker 1
- Dynon 1

== Bibliography ==
- Atkinson, Graeme; Atkinson, Brant (2009). The Complete Book of AFL Finals (4th ed.). The Five Mile Press. ISBN 9781742112756.
- Main, Jim (2006). When it matters most : the Norm Smith Medallist and best on ground in every Grand Final. Melbourne, Victoria: Bas Publishing. ISBN 1920910689.
- Ross, John, ed. (1996). 100 Years of Australian Football 1897–1996: The Complete Story of the AFL, All the Big Stories, All the Great Pictures, All the Champions, Every AFL Season Reported. Ringwood, Victoria: Viking. ISBN 0-670-86814-0.

== See also ==
- 1950 VFL season
- Essendon–North Melbourne rivalry
