= 1949 VFL grand final =

Grand final of the 1949 Victorian Football League season

1949 VFL Grand Final

Carlton	Essendon
6.16 (52)	18.17 (125)
	1	2	3	4
CAR	2.4 (16)	2.10 (22)	3.12 (30)	6.16 (52)
ESS	3.3 (21)	7.7 (49)	12.15 (87)	18.17 (125)
- Date: 24 September 1949
- Stadium: Melbourne Cricket Ground
- Attendance: 88,718

The 1949 VFL Grand Final was an Australian rules football game contested between the Carlton Football Club and Essendon Football Club, held at the Melbourne Cricket Ground on 24 September 1949. It was the 52nd annual grand final of the Victorian Football League, staged to determine the premiers for the 1949 VFL season. The match, attended by 88,718 spectators, was won by Essendon by 73 points, marking that club's ninth premiership victory, as well as Carlton's biggest Grand Final losing margin to date.

It was Essendon's fourth successive grand final appearance, having won the 1946 VFL Grand Final but finishing runners-up the previous two years. Star Bombers full-forward John Coleman, in his first season of VFL Football, kicked six goals for the game, the last of which brought up his 100th goal for the year.

== Teams ==
Carlton	Essendon

Carlton
B:	Ritchie Green	Ollie Grieve	Fred Davies
HB:	Jim Clark	Bert Deacon	Jim Baird
C:	Doug Williams	Ern Henfry (c)	Arthur Hodgson
HF:	Jack Conley	Jack Howell	Ray Garby
F:	Geoff Brokenshire	Ken Baxter	Herb Turner
Foll:	Ken Hands	Frank Bateman	Jim Mooring
Res:	Bernie Baxter	Fred Stafford	
Coach:	Percy Bentley		

Essendon
B:	Alan Thaw	Bill Brittingham	Wally May
HB:	Norm McDonald	Roy McConnell	Les Gardiner
C:	Vic Fisher	Harold Lambert	Bob Bradley
HF:	Jack Jones	Ted Leehane	Ron McEwin
F:	Dick Reynolds (c)	John Coleman	Keith Rawle
Foll:	Bob Syme	Bob McClure	Bill Hutchison
Res:	Gordon Lane	George Hassell	
Coach:	Dick Reynolds		

Umpire – Jack McMurray

== Scorecard ==
1949 VFL Grand Final
Saturday, 24 September 2:30pm	Carlton	def. by	Essendon	MCG (crowd: 88,718)
2.4 (16); 2.10 (22); 3.12 (30); 6.16 (52)	Q1; Q2; Q3; Final	3.3 (21); 7.7 (49); 12.15 (87); 18.17 (125)	Umpires: Jack McMurray, Jr.
Howell, Turner, Garby, B. Baxter, K. Baxter, Hands 1	Goals	6 Coleman; 3 Rawle; 2 Hutchison, Syme, Jones; 1 McEwin, Leehane, D. Reynolds
Deacon, Grieve, Green, Clark, Howell, Henfry	Best	McClure, May, Hutchison, Coleman, Brittingham, McDonald
Injuries	Nil

== See also ==
- 1949 VFL season
