= Les Foote =

Australian rules footballer (1924–2006)

Personal information
- Full name: Leslie Roy Foote
- Born: 20 August 1924
- Died: 11 April 2006 (aged 81); Victoria, Australia
- Original team: North Melbourne Colts
- Height: 182 cm (6 ft 0 in)
- Weight: 85 kg (187 lb)

Playing career^{1}
Years	Club	Games (Goals)
1941–1951	North Melbourne	134 (105)
1952–1953	Berrigan	? (?)
1954–1955	St Kilda	33 (4)
1956	Maffra	? (?)
1957–1958	Preston	26 (22)
1959	Maffra	? (?)
Total		183 (131)

Representative team honours^{2}
Years	Team	Games (Goals)
1946–1951	Victoria	

Coaching career^{3}
Years	Club	Games (W–L–D)
1952–1953	Berrigan	? (?)
1954–1955	St Kilda	36 (5–30–1)
1956	Maffra	?
1957–1958	Preston	40 (20-19-1)
1959	Maffra	?
1967	North Melbourne 2nds	? (?)
1972	Canterbury	? (?)
1976	Box Hill	18 (4-14-0)
- ^{1} Playing statistics correct to the end of 1959.^{2} Representative statistics correct as of 1951.^{3} Coaching statistics correct as of 1976.

Career highlights
- North Melbourne best & fairest: 1945, 1949–1950; North Melbourne captain: 1949–1951; St Kilda best & fairest: 1954; North Melbourne Reserves Premiership coach: 1967; Canterbury Football Club, SESFL Premiership coach: 1972; Australian Football Hall of Fame inductee

Leslie Roy Foote (20 August 1924 – 11 April 2006) was an Australian rules footballer in the Victorian Football League.

== Football career ==
Recruited from the North Melbourne Colts, Foote played his first match with the North Melbourne Football Club in 1941 at just 16 years of age.

Foote was able to kick equally well with both feet, and had good control over the ball when in packs.

He was famous for his baulking and dodging skills (skills which he claimed to have honed "by walking through the crowded city footpaths, dodging and weaving through the oncoming people") and his courageous style of play.

He would torment his opponents by running straight towards them, holding the ball out to them – and, then, doing a blind turn around them, and continuing on his way.

His favourite ploy was, having taken a mark, to walk back and pretend to be preparing to do a drop kick, the man on the mark would jump into the air as Foote approached and, he would continue running towards the man on the mark, bounce the ball, and run straight past him, giving him the opportunity to deliver the ball much further up the ground.

Foote was selected for Victoria a number of times against the following teams -

- 1946: Victoria v South Australia, in Melbourne.
- 1946: South Australia v Victoria in Adelaide.
- 1948: Riverina v Victoria, at Leeton, New South Wales.
- 1950: Victoria v Western Australia, in Brisbane.
- 1950: Victoria v South Australia, in Brisbane.
- 1951: Victoria v South Australia, in Melbourne.

== Sixth round 1947 ==
Les Foote was responsible for one of the greatest comebacks ever seen in the last quarter of an AFL/VFL football match. In the sixth round of the home-and-home season (24 May 1947), playing at the Arden Street Oval against Essendon, North Melbourne was 44 points behind at three-quarter time: North 7.8 (50) v Essendon 14.10 (94).

Coming into the match, North Melbourne were on the bottom of the ladder and had lost the two preceding matches. In the fourth round (10 May 1947), North Melbourne had been thrashed by Fitzroy by 101 points, and did not kick a goal until the last quarter, while in the fifth round (17 May 1947), North Melbourne had been beaten by Footscray by 41 points after trailing all day.

Foote placed himself into the ruck at three-quarter time. He dominated the ruck, and North Melbourne were so dominant during the last quarter that the ball was at Essendon's end of the ground only once, and North scored 8.4 (52) to Essendon's zero to win the match by 8 points: North 15.12 (102) d. Essendon 14.10 (94).

To put the magnitude of this win into some sort of perspective, the team that North Melbourne thrashed in the last quarter of that match went on to play in the Grand Final that year, losing by a single point when Carlton's Fred Stafford goaled with 40 seconds left to play.

Further, to get some perspective of Foote's astonishing performance as a ruckman on that day, at 182 cm he was dominating the three ruckmen Essendon had selected to play that day; namely, Ivan Goodingham (191 cm ), Perc Bushby (189 cm ), Bob McClure (188 cm ).

This record stood unbeaten for 45 years.

== First Grand Final ==
Foote was the first man to captain North Melbourne into a VFL Grand Final in 1950, having played a career-best game against Geelong in the previous week's Preliminary Final, in which he almost single-handedly converted a seven-goal (42-point) deficit into a 17-point win for North Melbourne.

Essendon had already beaten North Melbourne in the Second Semi-Final 11.14 (80) to 11.11 (77) when, in driving rain, and with 30 seconds remaining, and with North Melbourne three points in front, North Melbourne's Jock McCorkell unexpectedly punched a ball that was already rolling out over the boundary line back into play just before it crossed the line, Essendon's John Coleman pounced on the ball and passed it to Ron McEwin in the goal square. McEwin kicked the goal, and Essendon won by three points.

North Melbourne's disappointment with such a narrow and unexpected loss was compounded by the fact that North Melbourne's champion full-forward Jock Spencer had earlier had what had seemed to be a legitimate spectacular aerial mark (i.e., a "speckie") disallowed in controversial circumstances.

Although Essendon had only lost one match during the season, many thought that North Melbourne, having lost such a close match two weeks before, and having played so well against Geelong, really had a good chance of winning the Grand Final against Essendon.

However, in an unexpectedly one-sided match, with a rain-lashed third quarter, North Melbourne "went the knuckle", rather than playing football, and they specifically targeted the Essendon star players Dick Reynolds, Ron McEwin, Bill Snell, Bert Harper, Ted Leehane, and John Coleman.

Essendon won the 1950 VFL Grand Final 13.14 (92) to 7.12 (54) in front of a crowd of 87,601 and The Argus newspaper, judged Les Foote as best on ground.

== Coaching ==
Foote took up a captain-coach position with the New South Wales based Berrigan Football Club in the Murray Football League. He coached Berrigan in 1952 (3rd) and 1953 (3rd), before returning to the VFL in 1954 as captain-coach of St. Kilda.

St Kilda finished 12th in both 1954 and 1955 under captain-coach, Les Foote until he retired after the 1955 VFL season and was replaced as coach by Alan Killigrew.

Foote was captain-coach of Maffra Football Club in 1956 and they lost the Gippsland Football League grand final to Bairnsdale, then was captain-coach of Preston in 1957 (4th) and 1958 (12th), then returned to Maffra as captain-coach in 1959, where they finished 4th.

Foote coached North Melbourne Football Club Reserves to the 1967 VFL Premiership.

In 1972, Foote coached Canterbury Football Club for one year only in the South East Suburban Football League, but did lead them to a premiership, with Canterbury: 22.11 - 133 defeating St. Kilda City: 17.13 - 115 in the SESFL grand final.

In 1976, he was non-playing coach of VFA Second Division Club Box Hill, who finished 9th on the ladder.

== Awards ==
He won three best and fairest awards with North Melbourne (1945, 1949, and 1950).

He won the St Kilda best and fairest award in 1954, having returned to the highest, toughest, and fastest level of Australian Rules football, and at the (in those days) advanced age of 30, Foote won St Kilda's best and fairest in front of the 1958 Brownlow Medalist Neil Roberts, the 8-time Victorian representative Keith Drinan, and 4-time Victorian representative and 1958 All-Australian player Jim Ross (the three won seven best and fairest awards between them).

Les Foote was inducted into the Australian Football Hall of Fame in 1996.

In 2005, Foote was named Shinboner of the early era (1925–1950)

Foote served in the RAAF during World War Two from 1942 to 1946 as a leading aircraftman.
