= Jack McMurray =

Two Australian rules football Hall of Fame umpires have been named Jack McMurray:

- Jack McMurray, Sr. (1889–1988)
- Jack McMurray, Jr. (1915–2004)
