= Col Thornton =

Australian rules footballer (1927–2005)

Personal information
- Full name: Colin Thornton
- Born: 8 May 1927
- Died: 12 September 2005 (aged 78)
- Original team: Kensington/Coburg Amateurs
- Height: 193 cm (6 ft 4 in)
- Weight: 89 kg (196 lb)

Playing career^{1}
Years	Club	Games (Goals)
1947–1953	North Melbourne	59 (19)
1954	St Kilda	6 (3)
Total		65 (22)
- ^{1} Playing statistics correct to the end of 1954.

Col Thornton (8 May 1927 – 12 September 2005) was an Australian rules footballer who played with North Melbourne and St Kilda in the Victorian Football League (VFL).

Thornton was a follower, recruited to North Melbourne from Kensington and Coburg Amateurs. He had his first full season in 1950 and finished the year with an appearance in the 1950 VFL Grand Final, the first in the club's history. Thornton was the ruckman of the team but it was his opponent Bob McClure who would finish in the winning side.

Despite playing all 18 games in 1951, Thornton spent most of the 1952 and 1953 seasons in the reserves. He was granted a clearance to St Kilda in the 1954 pre-season but played just six senior games at his new club, where he was coached by former North Melbourne teammate Les Foote.
