= Doug Heywood =

Australian rules footballer and commentator

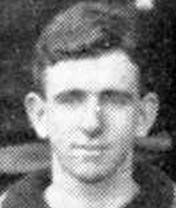

Personal information
- Full name: Douglas Samuel Heywood
- Born: 12 December 1924; Seymour, Victoria
- Died: 26 July 2002 (aged 77)
- Original team: Scotch College
- Height: 178 cm (5 ft 10 in)
- Weight: 70 kg (154 lb)
- Position: Half-forward flank

Playing career^{1}
| Years | Club | Games (Goals) |
| 1943–44, 1948–51 | Melbourne | 54 (30) |
- ^{1} Playing statistics correct to the end of 1951.

Douglas Samuel Heywood (12 December 1924 – 26 July 2002) was an Australian rules footballer who played with Melbourne in the Victorian Football League (VFL) during the 1940s and early 1950s before becoming a noted sports commentator.

As a schoolboy at Scotch College, Heywood excelled in multiple sports including tennis, in which he won the Victorian Schoolboys Doubles title in 1942, and football, where he captained the team into an undefeated year in 1942. Heywood made his VFL debut in the 1943 season and after sporadic appearances that year was a regular selection in 1944, playing 16 of a possible 18 games. He was used mostly as a half forward flanker.

His football career was put on hold in 1945 with his service in the RAAF taking precedence. After being discharged from Darwin in 1946 he moved back to Melbourne where he undertook and completed a Commerce Degree. He won premierships in the Victorian Amateur Football Association with the University Blacks during his time at Melbourne University.

With the Melbourne Football Club suffering from injuries in the 1948 finals series, Heywood and his University Blacks teammate Denis Cordner were surprise recalls for the preliminary final against Collingwood despite both not having played with the club for four years. Melbourne won the game and took on Essendon in the Grand Final, with Heywood lining up in his favoured half forward flank position. For the first time in VFL history the Grand Final was drawn and Heywood lost his place in the team for the replay when Bob McKenzie returned from injury.

Heywood played another full season in 1950, including a game against Hawthorn where he kicked six goals, and retired after ten senior appearances in 1951.

As a sports commentator, Heywood called football games and appeared on panel shows on ABC TV as well as commentating on tennis matches at the same network. He also commented on Saturday football games for radio station 3AW. He was a committeeman of the Melbourne Cricket Club and a promoter of its Gallery of Sport.
