= Harold Lambert (footballer) =

Australian rules footballer (1922–2021)

Personal information
- Full name: Harold Louis Lambert
- Born: 16 May 1922; Essendon, Victoria
- Died: 22 May 2021 (aged 99)
- Original teams: La Mascotte, Melbourne
- Height: 175 cm (5 ft 9 in)
- Weight: 76 kg (168 lb)

Playing career^{1}
| Years | Club | Games (Goals) |
| 1940–41, 1946–51 | Essendon | 99 (2) |
- ^{1} Playing statistics correct to the end of 1951.

Career highlights
- Essendon Premiership 1946, 1949, 1950

Harold Louis Lambert (16 May 1922 – 22 May 2021) was an Australian rules footballer for Essendon in the Victorian Football League (VFL).

Lambert made his debut in 1940, winning the best first year junior player award for the season. He missed four years of football from 1942 to 1945 when he was serving in the Australian Army in Papua New Guinea and the Pacific during World War II. A half-back flanker, he played in three Essendon premierships upon his return, in 1946, 1949 and 1950.

His older brother Chris Lambert also played for Essendon.

== Recognition ==
In 2002, an Essendon panel ranked him at 25 in their Champions of Essendon list of the 25 greatest players ever to have played for Essendon. He was also named in Essendon's Team of the Century. After the death of Jack Jones on 24 March 2020, Lambert was the last surviving member of Essendon's 1946 and 1949 premiership teams.
