= Lance Arnold =

Australian rules footballer

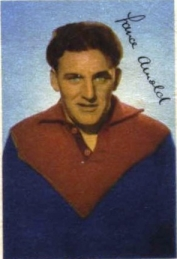

Personal information
- Born: 6 May 1926
- Died: 31 January 1990 (aged 63)
- Original team: Mildura (Sunraysia FL)
- Height: 185 cm (6 ft 1 in)
- Weight: 87 kg (192 lb)

Playing career^{1}
Years	Club	Games (Goals)
1946–1954	Melbourne	149 (88)
- ^{1} Playing statistics correct to the end of 1954.

Career highlights
- VFL premiership player: 1948; Melbourne leading goal kicker, 1948

Lance Arnold (6 May 1926 – 31 January 1990) was an Australian rules footballer who played for Melbourne in the Victorian Football League (VFL) in the 1940s and 1950s.

Arnold was Mildura's best player in their 1945 Sunraysia Football League's grand final loss to RAAF and also won the club's best and fairest award too, prior to playing with Melbourne.

Arnold was a member of Melbourne's 1948 VFL Premiership team and was their leading goalkicker, with 41 goals.
