= Robert McKenzie (footballer, born 1950) =

Australian rules footballer

Personal information
- Full name: Robert McKenzie
- Born: 31 May 1950 (age 76)
- Height: 180 cm (5 ft 11 in)
- Weight: 77 kg (170 lb)

Playing career^{1}
Years	Club	Games (Goals)
1969–72	Melbourne	42 (21)
- ^{1} Playing statistics correct to the end of 1972.

Robert Davis McKenzie (born 31 May 1950) is a former Australian rules footballer who played with Melbourne in the Victorian Football League (VFL).

His father Bob McKenzie was a dual Melbourne Premiership player in the 1940s and 1950s.
