= Keith Rawle =

Australian rules footballer and cricketer

Personal information
- Full name: Keith Trevillian Rawle
- Born: 29 October 1924; Essendon, Victoria
- Died: 6 March 2005 (aged 80)
- Original team: North Essendon Methodists
- Height: 169 cm (5 ft 7 in)
- Weight: 70 kg (154 lb)
- Position: Forward pocket

Playing career^{1}
Years	Club	Games (Goals)
1942–43, 1946–49	Essendon	111 (98)
- ^{1} Playing statistics correct to the end of 1949.

Career highlights
- 2× VFL premiership player: 1946, 1949

Keith Trevillian Rawle (29 October 1924 – 6 March 2005) was an Australian rules footballer who played for Essendon in the Victorian Football League (VFL) during the 1940s.

== Family ==
He was the son of former North Melbourne and Essendon footballer George Rawle.

== Football ==
Rawle usually played as a forward pocket and had two stints with Essendon. He was a member of Essendon's VFL premiership teams in 1946 and again in 1949 when he kicked three goals in what would be his last VFL game. He also received a premiership medal for the 1942 VFL Grand Final as the emergency - he did not take the field.

He also played in three losing Grand Final sides, all of which were close games. In 1943 his team lost to Richmond by five points, in 1947 they were defeated by a point to Carlton and in 1948 Essendon lost a Grand Final replay to Melbourne after drawing the original game.

He won the Best Utility Player award in 1943 and in both 1946 and 1948 won the Most Unselfish Player award. In 1947, he was runner-up to Bill Hutchison for the Crichton Medal. Rawle won the 1951 Ballarat Football League best and fairest award, the Ballarat Courier newspaper Gold Medal, representing Redan, which he was captain - coach of between 1950 and 1954, winning the 1952 premiership.

== War service ==
He was enlisted in 1942 and from 1944 to 1946 was in active service in New Guinea for the Royal Australian Air Force. He was part of the 1st Aircraft Performance Unit, serving as a wireless maintenance mechanic.

== Cricket ==
In 1948 he played a first-class cricket match for Victoria against Tasmania in Hobart and made 10 runs.

Rawle also played 113 first eleven, Melbourne District Cricket matches for the Essendon Cricket Club between 1940 and 1950.

He was selected to tour with the Australian Test Team but broke his wrist the week prior to departure.

== See also ==
- List of Victoria first-class cricketers
