= Jack Jones (footballer, born 1924) =

Australian rules footballer (1924–2020)

Personal information
- Full name: John Raymond Jones
- Born: 7 November 1924; Ascot Vale
- Died: 24 March 2020 (aged 95)
- Original team: Ascot Vale CYMS (CYMSFA)
- Debut: Rd. 1 1946, Essendon vs. Footscray, at Western Oval
- Height: 185 cm (6 ft 1 in)
- Weight: 85 kg (187 lb)

Playing career^{1}
Years	Club	Games (Goals)
1946–1954	Essendon	175 (156)
1955–1959	Albury	? (179)
- ^{1} Playing statistics correct to the end of 1954.

Career highlights
- Essendon premiership 1946, 1949, 1950; Albury premiership captain/coach 1956

John Raymond Jones (7 November 1924 – 24 March 2020) was an Australian rules footballer in the Victorian Football League (VFL), who played for the Essendon Football Club.

== Early life ==
Born in Ascot Vale, a suburb deep in the Bomber heartland, he was the second youngest of six children. He saw his first game at Windy Hill in 1933 aged eight, the day Dick Reynolds debuted.

== Military service ==
Jones enlisted in the Second AIF on 15 December 1942, and served with the 24th Infantry Battalion in New Guinea and Bougainville, before returning home. He was discharged on 14 March 1946.

== Career ==
On his return from military service, Jones was cleared to Essendon from CYMS Football Association (CYMSFA) club Ascot Vale CYMS, and became a regular player.

Jones began his career at Essendon in 1946 wearing the number 24 jumper, and went on to play 175 games and kick 156 goals. He could be dangerous on a half-forward flank as well as taking a fair share of the ruck work. He used his speed to the full by continually breaking into the open. He also thrilled fans with his high marking and was a good long kick, and was considered one of the fastest big men in the game.

Between 1946 and 1952, Jones played in 133 consecutive games, a feat no Essendon player has bettered. He also never played in the Seconds, missing senior games only through injury.

He played during one of the club's golden eras alongside champions like Reynolds, Coleman and Hutchison. He was a reserve in the 1946 premiership team and starred on the half-forward flank in the 1949 premiership team. He was also in that spot in the 1950 premiership win. In all, he played in 18 finals games and seven Grand Finals.

He was vice-captain of the State side against a combined Riverina team, at Narrandera in 1951, and won Essendon's best utility player award in 1946, 1947, 1949 and 1954 and the best clubman award in 1953.

== Post-football career ==
After leaving Essendon, Jones became captain-coach of Albury from 1955 to 1959 in the Ovens and Murray Football League. Jones coached Albury to the 1956 O&MFL premiership. He then coached Kergunyah Football Club in 1960. He later umpired in the Albury & District League for two years.

He maintained a long association with Essendon over the years, running tours at Windy Hill and hosting sponsors and guests on match day as well as speaking to players and providing inspiration.

In 2010, Essendon announced the inauguration of the Jack Jones Academy: a development program for all first-, second- and third-year players.

== Death ==
In February 2020, he was diagnosed with cancer and told he had, "maybe three months, maybe six months". He responded by saying "I'm quite ready, 95 is not a bad age to live".

Jones died on 24 March at the age of 95. His granddaughter, football commentator Sarah Jones, noted the coincidence of the number 24 being the date of his death, the battalion he served in during World War II, and his jumper number when playing with Essendon.
