= Jack Hedley (Australian footballer) =

Australian rules footballer (1930–2021)

Personal information
- Full name: John Robert Hedley
- Born: 1 July 1930
- Died: 27 July 2021 (aged 91)
- Original team: YCW
- Height: 163 cm (5 ft 4 in)
- Weight: 63 kg (139 lb)

Playing career^{1}
Years	Club	Games (Goals)
1948–1950	North Melbourne	31 (15)
1952–1955	Camberwell (VFA)	52 (73)
Total		83 (88)
- ^{1} Playing statistics correct to the end of 1955.

John Robert Hedley (1 July 1930 – 27 July 2021) was an Australian rules footballer who played with North Melbourne in the Victorian Football League (VFL).

Having only played junior football, Hedley came into the North Melbourne side after "walking in off the street" and asking for a chance to play for the club. He made his debut in 1948, at the age of 17 and played a total of ten games that season. His final game for North Melbourne was the 1950 VFL Grand Final, which he started from the bench.

A rover, Hedley spent the next part of his career playing with Camberwell in the Victorian Football Association. He was cleared to South Melbourne in 1954 but was restricted entirely to the seconds.
