= Harry Equid =

Australian rules footballer and coach

Personal information
- Full name: Henry Mervyn Equid
- Born: 8 October 1923; Ouyen, Victoria
- Died: 2 April 1984 (aged 60); Cowes, Victoria
- Original team: Mildura Rovers
- Height: 188 cm (6 ft 2 in)
- Weight: 95 kg (209 lb)
- Position: Follower/Half forward

Playing career^{1}
Years	Club	Games (Goals)
1945–48	Essendon	40 (67)
- ^{1} Playing statistics correct to the end of 1948.

Henry Mervyn Equid (8 October 1923 – 2 April 1984) was an Australian rules footballer who played for Essendon in the Victorian Football League (VFL) during the 1940s.

== Family ==
The son of Edward Equid (c.1877-1933), and Catherine Elsie May Equid (c.1885-1977), née McElhinney, Henry Mervyn Equid was born at Ouyen, Victoria on 8 October 1923.

He married Dorothy Helen Haley (1915-1989), née Love, later Mrs. Benjamin Omri Davies, in 1946.

== Football ==
Equid began his VFL career after serving with the army in World War II and made his debut against North Melbourne, in the final game of the 1945 season, kicking three goals. In 1946 he continued where he had left off and started the season with a goalscoring sequence of three, three and seven. He finished the year with 35 goals, the last of which came from the half forward flank in Essendon's grand final win over Melbourne.

He was also used as a follower. After making just seven appearances in 1947, which included six goals against Footscray, Equid had his final season for Essendon in 1948 and played his last game in his club's losing grand final team.

He then went to the Victorian Football Association and captain-coached Coburg from 1949 until 1951, playing one further year with the club in 1952. He won the club's best and fairest award in 1949.

He was the captain-coach of the Kyneton Football Club in the Bendigo Football League in 1953, and he played with South Mildura in the Sunraysia Football League, and was the team's vice-captain, in 1954.

== Place-kicks ==
Equid was one of the very few players of his era, and thus one of the last in the league's history, to favour the place kick over the punt kick when shooting for goal.

On 7 August 1949 (by then he was playing with Coburg), he took part in a goal-kicking competition conducted during the half-time break during a charity match between the Essendon District Football League and the Footscray District Football League. Each player had nine shots at goal from about 50 yards out: three from the left side of the goal, three from the right side of the goal, and three from straight in front. Using place-kicks, and competing against Footscray's Charlie Sutton, who kicked drop-kicks, and Essendon's John Coleman, who kicked punt kicks, Equid won the contest.
