= Wally May =

Australian rules footballer and coach (1926–2011)

Personal information
- Full name: Wallace William May
- Born: 11 September 1926
- Died: 16 May 2011 (aged 84)
- Original team: Melbourne Boys League
- Height: 185 cm (6 ft 1 in)
- Weight: 85 kg (187 lb)

Playing career^{1}
Years	Club	Games (Goals)
1947–52	Essendon	94 (8)
1954–59	Sturt	54 (14)
Total		148 (22)
- ^{1} Playing statistics correct to the end of 1959.

Career highlights
- Essendon Premiership 1949, 1950; Sturt Best and Fairest 1955; Sturt Captain Coach 1956

Wally May (11 September 1926 – 16 May 2011) was an Australian rules footballer in the Victorian Football League and the South Australian Football League, playing for the Essendon Football Club and Sturt Football Club respectively.

Predominantly playing as a defender and ruckman, May was an integral part of Essendon's 1949 and 1950 premiership victories, and compiled a total of ninety-four games for the club. His on-field efforts resulted in him finishing second in Essendon's 1951 best and fairest award behind teammate Norm McDonald. Following the 1952 season, May asked the club for a clearance to Sturt. When this was refused, he stepped away from football for a year until it was granted.

In his four seasons with the Sturt, May played a total of fifty-four league games, and represented South Australia twice in state representative football. After winning Sturt's best and fairest award in 1955, he was installed as captain-coach of the club for the 1956 season. However, following a poor season where Sturt produced just 3 wins and a draw from 18 games, May resigned, citing 'business reasons'. He decided to remain with the club as a player under his replacement coach, Ed Tilley.

After retiring from the sport, May remained in Adelaide and worked as a caster and a commenter talent for SANFL match telecasts. May was originally chosen as a commentator by Channel 9’s Mike Petersen because of his controversial reputation as one of football’s hitmen during his career with Sturt. Ironically, as a television commentator, he was regarded as a gentle giant. May also appeared on the Channel 9 Sunday Football Show, compered by former South Australian umpire Max Hall from 1966-79. Extensive radio coverage of South Australian Football League games continued in the television era with former star players such as Jim Deane and Lindsay Backman featured on ABC radio (then 5AN).

Wally May died on Monday, 16 May 2011.
