= Jack McMurray Sr. =

Jack McMurray Sr. (21 September 1889 – 16 July 1988) was a leading Australian rules football field umpire in the Victorian Football League (VFL) in the early twentieth century.

== Footballer ==
McMurray was born in Port Melbourne, Victoria, in 1889.

His father, Arch, played for Port Melbourne Football Club and South Melbourne Football Club during the 1880s. He also represented Victoria.

Jack showed a keen interest in football. He began umpiring in the South Suburban competition aged 16, but the next year decided that he wanted to play, so joined the Rosedale juniors at Port Melbourne.

He found the going tough by virtue of his very slight physique (155 cm and 50 kg) and in 1908 he returned to umpiring and officiated in the Metropolitan Junior Association.

== VFA umpire ==
Three years later, his progression found him umpiring in the Victorian Junior Association and in 1913 he was appointed to the Victorian Football Association (VFA). In 1914, he handled the First Semi-Final and two weeks later the Grand Final between North Melbourne and Footscray. In 1915 he umpired through the home and away season but could not dislodge Tom Kendall who umpired all three finals matches that year.

== VFL umpire ==
With the VFA competition suspended during World War I, he moved to the rival Victorian Football League (VFL) (the VFL renamed Australian Football League (AFL) in 1991).

In 1917, he umpired his first match, Fitzroy versus Richmond, at the Brunswick Street Oval, on Monday 4 June 1917.

In June 1920, he umpired the rest of the season in the seniors and becoming a first choice umpire. His first significant matches were the 1921 finals series, where he umpired three of the four finals, Jack Elder being appointed to the Second Semi-Final.

McMurray now established himself as 'the' umpire of the period, having almost a monopoly on finals, interstate and carnival matches. He was in charge of the first half of the only match ever between the VFL and VFA Premiers. Played in 1924, after a particularly unsuccessful League final series experiment, Footscray defeated Essendon and McMurray shared duties with the VFA's representative James Leheny.

== NTFA umpire ==
In 1929, the Great Depression led McMurray to accept an offer from the Northern Tasmanian Football Association (NTFA). He was appointed to umpire for £15 (equivalent to A$1,335 in 2022) a week (at the time the highest fee ever paid).

Contemporary reports stated that his excellent decision-making, consistency and strong control did much to improve the standard of play in Tasmania.

He returned to Melbourne at the end of the season and was immediately reappointed to the VFL for 1930.

== Haydn Bunton incident ==
One famous incident in McMurray's career involved the great Haydn Bunton Sr. In 1934, Bunton dominated the last game of the season; and, as he walked off the ground, he made a flippant remark to McMurray, along the lines of: "That wasn't bad today, Jack."

"Never try to bribe an umpire," McMurray apparently replied—and left him out of the votes. Bunton lost the Brownlow medal to Dick Reynolds by one vote that season.

== Senior career ==
In August 1936, 20 seasons after his first VFL match, McMurray became the first umpire to officiate in 300 VFL matches. He eventually retired from VFL umpiring at the end of that season having umpired a total of 307 matches (including 4 as a boundary umpire), 23 finals (including 5 Grand Finals) and a record 15 interstate appointments.

He umpired one final season in the country leagues and at the end of 1937, aged 47, and left the field for good.

== Honours ==
He was made a life member of the League in 1980 matching his 1933 Life Membership of the VFL Umpires Association. McMurray was further recognised by the awarding of the Jack McMurray Scholarships. These were presented to the best two first year umpires on the Cadet Squad list each year between and 1987 and 1991 by the then VFL Commission.

McMurray was inducted to the Australian Football Hall of Fame in 1996.

His son Jack McMurray Jr. was also a highly respected umpire and also inducted into the Hall of Fame.
