= Ted Rippon =

Australian rules footballer

Personal information
- Full name: Edward Charles Rippon
- Born: 29 April 1914; Cheltenham, Victoria
- Died: 12 December 1991 (aged 77)
- Original team: Cheltenham
- Debut: 22 July 1933 (Round 13), Essendon vs. St Kilda, at St Kilda Cricket Ground
- Height: 184 cm (6 ft 0 in)
- Weight: 83 kg (183 lb)

Playing career^{1}
| Years | Club | Games (Goals) |
| 1933–1939 | Essendon | 69 (12) |
| 1944–1945 | St Kilda | 17 (19) |
| Total | | 86 (31) |
- ^{1} Playing statistics correct to the end of 1945.

Career highlights
- 1935: Most Serviceable Player (Essendon); Vice president Essendon F.C. (1950–1956)

Edward Charles Rippon (29 April 1914 – 12 December 1991) was an Australian rules footballer who played for Essendon—and for St Kilda after World War II began to draw to a close—in the Victorian Football League (VFL).

== Family ==
The son of Edward Charles Rippon (1869–1946), and Florence Georgina Rippon (1876–1964), née Kenney, Edward Charles Rippon was born on 29 April 1914. He married Jen Brenda Watson on 26 November 1938.

== Football ==
Ted Rippon was recruited by Carlton from Cheltenham; however, a series of injuries prevented him from breaking into Carlton Seniors.

He moved to Essendon in 1933, and made his senior debut against St Kilda on 22 July 1933 (Round 13 of the home-and-away season). He was a good, hard-working, reliable player for Essendon, winning Essendon's Most Serviceable Player award in 1935, who played most of his 69 senior games in the ruck. He was often referred to as "Autumn Leaves" because of his propensity to fall over after contesting the ball in the air; Carlton's John Benetti (played 1958–1965) was also known as "Autumn Leaves Benetti" for a similar reason.

Rippon played a number of games for the Carlton Second XVIII in 1939 and 1941, but he never played with the First XVIII. Employed as a policeman from 1935 to 1945, Rippon played for the Police Force team in the Wednesday competition.

Ted Rippon later spent two seasons with St Kilda (1944–1945) and played 17 senior games.

== Essendon ==
Rippon served on the Essendon Football Club Committee as vice president from 1950 to 1956. He was a pallbearer at his business associate John Coleman's funeral on 9 April 1973.

== Media ==
Rippon was also a football commentator on both radio (3AW) and television (HSV 7 Melbourne's World of Sport).
