= Frank Jeeves =

Australian rules footballer

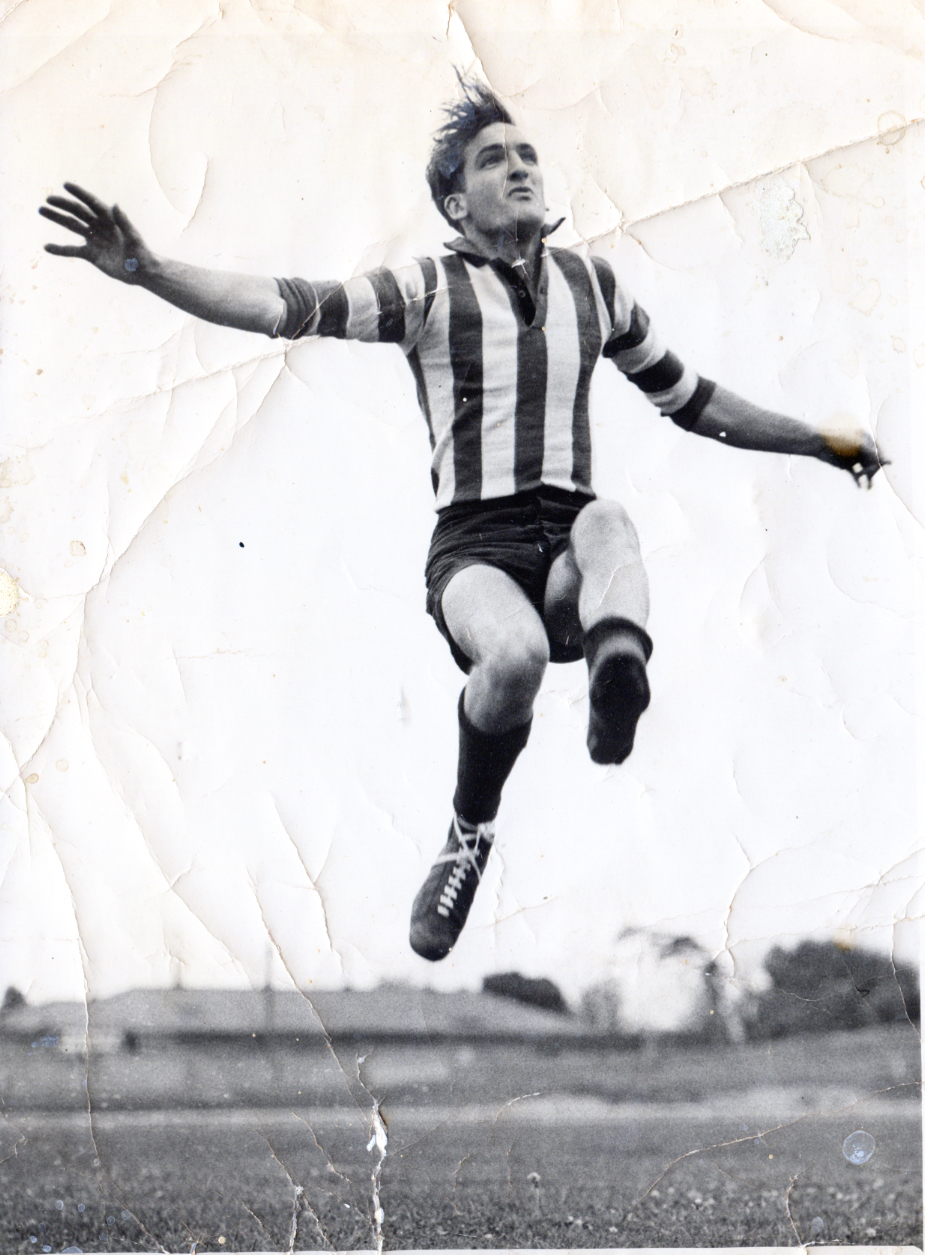

Personal information
- Full name: Francis William Jeeves
- Born: 15 February 1927
- Died: 11 June 2010 (aged 83)
- Original team: Fitzroy seconds
- Height: 180 cm (5 ft 11 in)
- Weight: 76 kg (168 lb)

Playing career^{1}
Years	Club	Games (Goals)
1947–1954	North Melbourne	65 (25)
- ^{1} Playing statistics correct to the end of 1954.

Francis "Frank" Jeeves (15 February 1927 – 11 June 2010) was an Australian rules footballer who played with North Melbourne in the Victorian Football League (VFL).

Jeeves, who came from Wonthaggi originally, arrived at North Melbourne via the Fitzroy seconds.

He played his best football in 1949, as a centre half-forward, polling eight Brownlow Medal votes to finish as North Melbourne's third best vote getter. This was despite missing the last six rounds of the season due to an injury, which also kept him out of the finals series.

Jeeves missed another 14 weeks of football in 1950 with an injured ankle but this time recovered before the finals and lined up at centre half-forward in the VFL Grand Final. He had an uninterrupted season in 1951, playing all 18 games.

During the 1954 season, having not played a game the previous year, Jeeves was granted a clearance to Moorabbin.
