= Jim Malone (footballer) =

Australian rules footballer (1925–2021)

Personal information
- Full name: James Malone
- Born: 13 November 1925
- Died: 23 October 2021 (aged 95)
- Original team: Laanecoorie
- Height: 173 cm (5 ft 8 in)
- Weight: 70 kg (154 lb)

Playing career^{1}
| Years | Club | Games (Goals) |
| 1945–1952 | North Melbourne | 102 (24) |
- ^{1} Playing statistics correct to the end of 1952.

James Malone (13 November 1925 – 23 October 2021) was an Australian rules footballer who played with North Melbourne in the Victorian Football League (VFL).

Initially a wingman, Malone spent much of his time at North Melbourne playing as a rover. Malone, who came from Laanecoorie, was joined at North Melbourne by his brother Joe in 1946. Another brother, Jack Malone, played for Footscray earlier in the decade.

Malone was the first rover in North Melbourne's 1950 VFL Grand Final team, their first grand final since entering the competition in 1925. His participation had been in doubt during the week due to a shoulder injury but he was declared fit.

He brought up his 100th league game during the 1951 VFL season and celebrated it with a three-point win over Richmond.

Despite playing the opening round of the 1952 season, Malone ended the year with Coburg.
