= Jack Mueller =

Australian rules footballer, born 1915

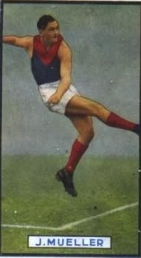

Personal information
- Full name: John Ernest Arthur Mueller
- Born: 9 September 1915; Echuca, Victoria, Australia
- Died: 14 June 2001 (aged 85)
- Original teams: Echuca Imperials, Echuca (Bendigo FL)
- Height: 188 cm (6 ft 2 in)
- Weight: 89 kg (196 lb)

Playing career^{1}
Years	Club	Games (Goals)
1934–1950	Melbourne	216 (378)

Representative team honours
Years	Team	Games (Goals)
1936–1941	Victoria	4 (4)
- ^{1} Playing statistics correct to the end of 1950.

Career highlights
- 4× VFL premierships: 1939, 1940, 1941, 1948; 3× Keith 'Bluey' Truscott Medallist: 1937, 1939, 1946; 2× Melbourne leading goalkicker: 1934, 1946; Melbourne Team of the Century–Forward-pocket; Australian Football Hall of Fame; Melbourne Hall of Fame

John Ernest Arthur Mueller (9 September 1915 – 14 June 2001) was an Australian rules footballer who played for the Melbourne Football Club in the Victorian Football League (VFL).

== Family ==
The son of Francis Carl Mueller (1880–1945), and Eliza Mary "Cissie" Mueller (1887–1960), née O'Brien, John Ernest Arthur Mueller was born on 9 September 1915.

He married Margaret Rose "Greta" Toohey on 14 April 1942.

== Football ==
Mueller played with Echuca Imperials in the Echuca Football League in 1932, then played with Echuca in the Bendigo Football League in 1933, kicking seven goals in his first game.

Mueller was famous for having only eight fingers, after losing two when he caught his hand in a machine at work.

He was an inspirational player who contributed significantly to the success of the Melbourne sides in which he played during the 1930s, '40s and '50s. He was notable as the primary instigator of Melbourne's 1948 flag victory after being recalled from retirement (with the reserves) for that year's Preliminary Final in which he kicked eight of his team's 25 goals against Collingwood. He followed this up with six out of 10 in the drawn Grand Final with Essendon and another six out of 13 the following week when Melbourne won the replay.

== War service ==
After initially being rejected in 1941 due to his missing fingers, Mueller served in the Australian Army from 1943 to 1945, playing very few games for Melbourne in these three seasons.

== Post-football career ==
In the late 1940s and 1950s, Mueller was a football commentator on 3KZ, working first with Norman Banks and later Philip Gibbs. Mueller also worked with Gibbs on the program Football Inquest, which was later simulcast on 3KZ and GTV-9.

== Death ==
Jack Mueller died on 14 June 2001 and is buried at Springvale Botanical Cemetery.
