= Norm McDonald (footballer, born 1925) =

Australian rules footballer (1925–2002)

Personal information
- Full name: Norman David McDonald
- Born: 10 December 1925; Richmond, Victoria, Australia
- Died: 28 November 2002 (aged 76); Footscray, Victoria, Australia
- Original team: Belmont/Geelong RAAF
- Height: 180 cm (5 ft 11 in)
- Weight: 74 kg (163 lb)

Playing career^{1}
Years	Club	Games (Goals)
1947–1953	Essendon	128 (3)
- ^{1} Playing statistics correct to the end of 1953.

Career highlights
- 2× VFL Premiership player: (1949, 1950); W.S. Crichton Medal: (1951); Indigenous Team of the Century - half-back flank

Norman David McDonald (10 December 1925 – 28 November 2002) was an indigenous Australian sportsman best known as an Australian rules footballer who played for the Essendon Football Club in the Victorian Football League (VFL). Hailing from the Gunditjmara tribe, McDonald was the first indigenous player to represent Essendon. He was also an accomplished sprinter and boxer.

== War Service ==
Lying about his age, McDonald enlisted in the Australian Army during World War II as a sixteen year old. He served for two years in the Northern Territory before transferring to the Australian Parachuting Training Centre in December 1944, qualifying after two months, and then returning to active duties. He was discharged in October 1946.

== Football ==
=== Essendon (VFL) ===
After finishing his war service, McDonald played in the Essendon premiership teams in 1949 and 1950 and won the Essendon Best and Fairest award in 1951. Although his attacking style of play sometimes resulted in goals to the opposition, captain-coach Dick Reynolds encouraged McDonald to continue to play his natural game. He played his 100th game in 1952.

=== Golden Square (BFL) ===
In 1954, McDonald was cleared from Essendon, and was appointed captain-coach of the Golden Square Football Club in the Bendigo Football League, in place of ex-North Melbourne footballer Harry Green. McDonald left the club before the end of the 1954 season, and his position was filled for the remainder of the season by the team's full-back, Vin Lapsley. Footscray's (1954) premiership half-back flanker Alan Martin took over as Golden Square's captain-coach in 1955.

== Other sports ==
A noted sprinter, McDonald won the 1949 Maryborough Gift and the 1949 Wangaratta Gift.

McDonald won the 1952 Wendouree Gift in the lead up to the Stawell Gift.

McDonald ran second in the (Monday, 14 April 1952) final of the 1952 Stawell Gift to his Essendon Football Club teammate, Lance Mann; and, two days later (Wednesday, 14 April 1952) he, once again, ran second to Mann — in the final of the Bendigo Easter Gift.

The Easter Gift was an entirely different race from the Bendigo Thousand that had been conducted earlier that year from 8—10 March 1952: "McDonald suffered a financial setback when he backed himself heavily to win the Bendigo Thousand and was beaten by 1ft. in his semi-final in time equal to 6yds., 2ft. inside evens — his best run of the season."

McDonald also ran second to Mann in the 1952 Lilydale Backmarkers Handicap on 22 March 1952.

Besides running, McDonald was also a featherweight boxer who fought in 23 professional bouts, winning 5 and losing 18. Most of them at the former West Melbourne Stadium.

== Death ==
McDonald died peacefully on 28 November 2002 at the Footscray Hospital. Essendon's then chief executive Peter Jackson released the following statement on hearing of his passing:

Norm McDonald contributed in a number of ways both on and off the field. He was a passionate Essendon man and followed the team with interest even after his playing days. Being honoured as a Champion of Essendon earlier this year is a testament to the quality player he was.

McDonald is buried at Altona Memorial Park.

== Posthumous Honours ==
In 2005, McDonald was named on the half-back flank of the Indigenous Team of the Century.

In 2018, he was inducted into the Victorian Aboriginal Honour Roll in recognition of his pioneering efforts for greater inclusion of Indigenous people in Australian Rules, especially in Victoria, as well as his contribution to his community for his fight against oppression and racism.

== Bibliography ==
- Main, Jim (2006). When it matters most : the Norm Smith Medallist and best on ground in every Grand Final. Bas Publishing. ISBN 1920910689.
- Maplestone, M., Flying Higher: History of the Essendon Football Club 1872–1996, Essendon Football Club, (Melbourne), 1996. ISBN 0-9591740-2-8
- Ross, J. (ed), 100 Years of Australian Football 1897–1996: The Complete Story of the AFL, All the Big Stories, All the Great Pictures, All the Champions, Every AFL Season Reported, Viking, (Ringwood), 1996. ISBN 0-670-86814-0
