= Jack McMurray Jr. =

Australian rules footballer, born 1915

Jack McMurray Jr. (17 August 1915 – 20 May 2004) was a leading Australian rules football field umpire in the Victorian Football League (VFL) in the 1940s and 1950s.

He started umpiring in the Melbourne Boy’s Club Association and umpired in the VFL in 1941 and 1942 before serving in the army during World War II. He rejoined the VFL in 1946 and umpired six Grand Finals (including both in 1948 when Essendon and Melbourne tied the first match).

His umpiring career spanned from 1941 to 1955, and in total he umpired 216 games, including 16 finals matches. He umpired grand finals in 1948 (x2), 1949, 1950, 1953, and 1954.

McMurray umpired grand finals and carnivals in most states under the system of exchanges and carnivals that were in place during his career. All games were umpired under the one-field-umpire system.

After retiring from VFL umpiring, Jack Jnr decided in 1956 to accept appointment to the Tasmanian Football League (TFL) umpire coaching role after an offer to take up either Perth or Hobart positions.

Following this move, McMurray umpired the TFL grand final umpire in 1956, which was his last senior game and then he retired from umpiring. However, he continued as Coach of TFL Umpire Association from 1956 to 1967 and a second stint from 1971–1974 inclusive.

Additionally, McMurray continued to serve football as Member of the TFLUA Umpire Appointment Board from 1956 to 1978, TFLUA Chairman of Board from 1975 through 1978, and as a member of the Southern Tasmanian High School Football Association; he was made a life member of TFLUA.

McMurray was inducted to the Australian Football Hall of Fame in 1996, together with his father, Jack McMurray Sr. Additionally, in 2005, McMurray was inducted as a Legend in the Tasmanian Football Hall of Fame in recognition of his umpire coaching contribution in Tasmania.
