= 1949 VFL season =

53rd season of the Victorian Football League (VFL)

1949 VFL premiership season
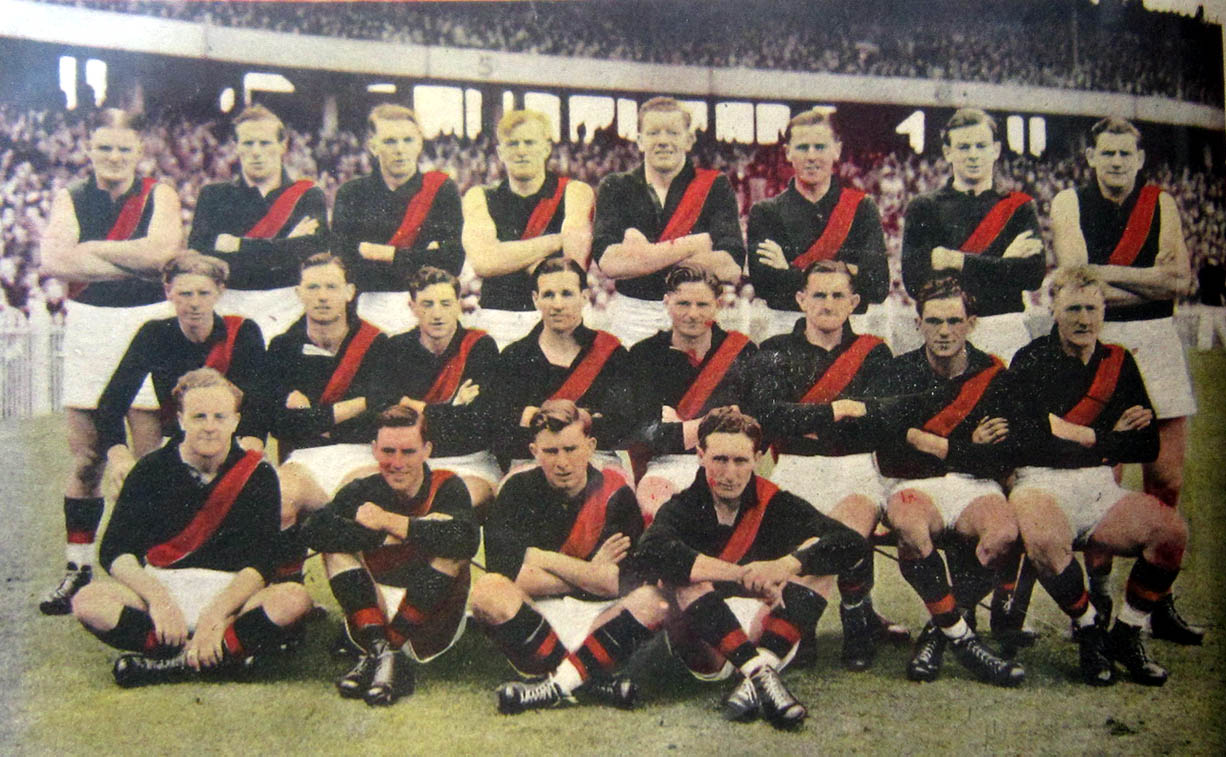
- Essendon Football Club, premiers
- Teams: 12
- Premiers: Essendon; 9th premiership
- Minor premiers: North Melbourne; 1st minor premiership
- Brownlow Medallist: Ron Clegg (South Melbourne); Col Austen (Hawthorn)
- Leading goalkicker medallist: John Coleman (Essendon)
- Matches played: 118
- Highest: 88,718

The 1949 VFL season was the 53rd season of the Victorian Football League (VFL), the highest level senior Australian rules football competition in Victoria. The season featured twelve clubs, ran from 16 April until 24 September, and comprised a 19-game home-and-away season followed by a finals series featuring the top four clubs.

The premiership was won by the Essendon Football Club for the ninth time, after it defeated Carlton by 73 points in the 1949 VFL Grand Final.

== Background ==
In 1949, the VFL competition consisted of twelve teams of 18 on-the-field players each, plus two substitute players, known as the 19th man and the 20th man. A player could be substituted for any reason; however, once substituted, a player could not return to the field of play under any circumstances.

Teams played each other in a home-and-away season of 19 rounds; matches 12 to 19 were the "home-and-way reverse" of matches 1 to 8.

Once the 19 round home-and-away season had finished, the 1949 VFL Premiers were determined by the specific format and conventions of the Page–McIntyre system.

== Home-and-away season ==
=== Round 1 ===
Home team	Home team score	Away team	Away team score	Venue	Crowd	Date
Geelong	21.19 (145)	Melbourne	12.11 (83)	Kardinia Park	25,000	16 April 1949
Essendon	18.12 (120)	Hawthorn	9.3 (57)	Windy Hill	13,500	16 April 1949
Collingwood	19.13 (127)	North Melbourne	10.17 (77)	Victoria Park	21,500	16 April 1949
St Kilda	11.10 (76)	Fitzroy	14.14 (98)	Junction Oval	18,000	16 April 1949
Carlton	16.16 (112)	South Melbourne	6.12 (48)	Princes Park	29,000	18 April 1949
Richmond	19.13 (127)	Footscray	8.10 (58)	Punt Road Oval	30,000	18 April 1949

=== Round 2 ===
Home team	Home team score	Away team	Away team score	Venue	Crowd	Date
Hawthorn	5.13 (43)	Richmond	20.12 (132)	Glenferrie Oval	13,000	23 April 1949
Footscray	12.7 (79)	Geelong	9.14 (68)	Western Oval	15,500	23 April 1949
South Melbourne	12.13 (85)	St Kilda	12.10 (82)	Lake Oval	9,000	23 April 1949
North Melbourne	7.14 (56)	Essendon	10.15 (75)	Arden Street Oval	20,000	23 April 1949
Melbourne	12.8 (80)	Collingwood	11.16 (82)	MCG	29,000	23 April 1949
Fitzroy	15.16 (106)	Carlton	15.15 (105)	Brunswick Street Oval	25,000	23 April 1949

=== Round 3 ===
Home team	Home team score	Away team	Away team score	Venue	Crowd	Date
North Melbourne	14.8 (92)	Richmond	9.5 (59)	Arden Street Oval	15,000	30 April 1949
Geelong	14.14 (98)	South Melbourne	10.15 (75)	Kardinia Park	19,000	30 April 1949
Collingwood	7.14 (56)	Fitzroy	8.9 (57)	Victoria Park	30,000	30 April 1949
Carlton	21.27 (153)	Hawthorn	7.6 (48)	Princes Park	9,250	30 April 1949
Melbourne	14.16 (100)	Footscray	7.6 (48)	MCG	24,000	30 April 1949
St Kilda	5.15 (45)	Essendon	13.16 (94)	Junction Oval	13,000	30 April 1949

=== Round 4 ===
Home team	Home team score	Away team	Away team score	Venue	Crowd	Date
Richmond	17.11 (113)	St Kilda	11.14 (80)	Punt Road Oval	12,000	7 May 1949
Footscray	4.15 (39)	North Melbourne	12.3 (75)	Western Oval	12,000	7 May 1949
Fitzroy	13.15 (93)	Geelong	15.15 (105)	Brunswick Street Oval	17,500	7 May 1949
South Melbourne	8.11 (59)	Melbourne	7.9 (51)	Lake Oval	12,000	7 May 1949
Hawthorn	5.10 (40)	Collingwood	9.11 (65)	Glenferrie Oval	11,500	7 May 1949
Essendon	6.9 (45)	Carlton	7.22 (64)	Windy Hill	29,000	7 May 1949

=== Round 5 ===
Home team	Home team score	Away team	Away team score	Venue	Crowd	Date
Melbourne	5.16 (46)	North Melbourne	6.12 (48)	MCG	19,000	14 May 1949
Geelong	15.13 (103)	St Kilda	10.11 (71)	Kardinia Park	15,500	14 May 1949
Essendon	11.18 (84)	Richmond	9.15 (69)	Windy Hill	21,000	14 May 1949
Carlton	16.8 (104)	Collingwood	10.14 (74)	Princes Park	33,000	14 May 1949
South Melbourne	10.8 (68)	Footscray	6.14 (50)	Lake Oval	11,000	14 May 1949
Hawthorn	9.13 (67)	Fitzroy	14.21 (105)	Glenferrie Oval	7,500	14 May 1949

=== Round 6 ===
Home team	Home team score	Away team	Away team score	Venue	Crowd	Date
Richmond	15.13 (103)	South Melbourne	8.12 (60)	Punt Road Oval	21,000	21 May 1949
Fitzroy	12.14 (86)	Footscray	10.22 (82)	Brunswick Street Oval	10,500	21 May 1949
Collingwood	11.16 (82)	Essendon	12.9 (81)	Victoria Park	23,000	21 May 1949
Carlton	18.13 (121)	Geelong	12.10 (82)	Princes Park	28,500	21 May 1949
St Kilda	4.13 (37)	Melbourne	8.13 (61)	Junction Oval	7,500	21 May 1949
North Melbourne	13.23 (101)	Hawthorn	12.7 (79)	Arden Street Oval	9,000	21 May 1949

=== Round 7 ===
Home team	Home team score	Away team	Away team score	Venue	Crowd	Date
Hawthorn	6.12 (48)	South Melbourne	12.15 (87)	Glenferrie Oval	10,000	28 May 1949
Essendon	11.9 (75)	Melbourne	13.12 (90)	Windy Hill	15,000	28 May 1949
North Melbourne	8.13 (61)	Geelong	8.7 (55)	Arden Street Oval	17,000	28 May 1949
Richmond	21.21 (147)	Fitzroy	9.12 (66)	Punt Road Oval	28,000	28 May 1949
Footscray	8.10 (58)	Collingwood	12.15 (87)	Western Oval	17,000	28 May 1949
St Kilda	8.14 (62)	Carlton	14.11 (95)	Junction Oval	13,000	28 May 1949

=== Round 8 ===
Home team	Home team score	Away team	Away team score	Venue	Crowd	Date
Geelong	10.15 (75)	Richmond	11.13 (79)	Kardinia Park	22,500	4 June 1949
Collingwood	21.22 (148)	St Kilda	4.12 (36)	Victoria Park	12,000	4 June 1949
Carlton	14.13 (97)	North Melbourne	10.7 (67)	Princes Park	29,500	4 June 1949
Melbourne	10.17 (77)	Hawthorn	10.6 (66)	MCG	11,000	4 June 1949
South Melbourne	12.7 (79)	Fitzroy	14.14 (98)	Lake Oval	12,500	4 June 1949
Footscray	7.17 (59)	Essendon	10.12 (72)	Western Oval	12,500	4 June 1949

=== Round 9 ===
Home team	Home team score	Away team	Away team score	Venue	Crowd	Date
Collingwood	17.14 (116)	Geelong	12.7 (79)	Victoria Park	27,500	11 June 1949
Hawthorn	10.13 (73)	Footscray	8.15 (63)	Glenferrie Oval	10,000	11 June 1949
South Melbourne	15.16 (106)	Essendon	12.9 (81)	Lake Oval	19,500	11 June 1949
North Melbourne	11.12 (78)	St Kilda	7.7 (49)	Arden Street Oval	10,000	13 June 1949
Fitzroy	7.10 (52)	Melbourne	10.14 (74)	Brunswick Street Oval	16,000	13 June 1949
Richmond	12.12 (84)	Carlton	14.15 (99)	Punt Road Oval	46,000	13 June 1949

=== Round 10 ===
Home team	Home team score	Away team	Away team score	Venue	Crowd	Date
North Melbourne	18.25 (133)	South Melbourne	6.9 (45)	Arden Street Oval	16,000	18 June 1949
Geelong	20.12 (132)	Hawthorn	6.10 (46)	Kardinia Park	12,000	18 June 1949
Essendon	8.19 (67)	Fitzroy	10.10 (70)	Windy Hill	15,000	18 June 1949
Carlton	11.12 (78)	Melbourne	12.14 (86)	Princes Park	26,500	18 June 1949
St Kilda	7.14 (56)	Footscray	11.11 (77)	Junction Oval	8,500	18 June 1949
Richmond	16.5 (101)	Collingwood	16.8 (104)	Punt Road Oval	29,000	18 June 1949

=== Round 11 ===
Home team	Home team score	Away team	Away team score	Venue	Crowd	Date
Melbourne	14.17 (101)	Richmond	9.9 (63)	MCG	24,000	2 July 1949
Fitzroy	10.12 (72)	North Melbourne	12.9 (81)	Brunswick Street Oval	14,000	2 July 1949
Collingwood	15.16 (106)	South Melbourne	6.16 (52)	Victoria Park	12,000	2 July 1949
St Kilda	13.11 (89)	Hawthorn	14.13 (97)	Junction Oval	7,000	2 July 1949
Geelong	25.17 (167)	Essendon	11.6 (72)	Kardinia Park	18,000	2 July 1949
Footscray	9.9 (63)	Carlton	7.16 (58)	Western Oval	13,000	2 July 1949

=== Round 12 ===
Home team	Home team score	Away team	Away team score	Venue	Crowd	Date
Footscray	12.11 (83)	Richmond	7.18 (60)	Western Oval	14,000	9 July 1949
Fitzroy	14.10 (94)	St Kilda	6.13 (49)	Brunswick Street Oval	7,000	9 July 1949
Melbourne	14.17 (101)	Geelong	14.14 (98)	MCG	20,000	9 July 1949
Hawthorn	7.0 (42)	Essendon	16.16 (112)	Glenferrie Oval	7,000	9 July 1949
North Melbourne	8.6 (54)	Collingwood	4.13 (37)	Arden Street Oval	21,000	9 July 1949
South Melbourne	6.12 (48)	Carlton	11.15 (81)	Lake Oval	15,000	9 July 1949

=== Round 13 ===
Home team	Home team score	Away team	Away team score	Venue	Crowd	Date
St Kilda	16.15 (111)	South Melbourne	13.13 (91)	Junction Oval	6,000	16 July 1949
Essendon	8.22 (70)	North Melbourne	6.13 (49)	Windy Hill	16,000	16 July 1949
Collingwood	7.16 (58)	Melbourne	10.13 (73)	Victoria Park	22,000	16 July 1949
Carlton	9.13 (67)	Fitzroy	9.8 (62)	Princes Park	17,500	16 July 1949
Richmond	16.21 (117)	Hawthorn	9.13 (67)	Punt Road Oval	7,000	16 July 1949
Geelong	13.15 (93)	Footscray	4.10 (34)	Kardinia Park	15,000	16 July 1949

=== Round 14 ===
Home team	Home team score	Away team	Away team score	Venue	Crowd	Date
Footscray	11.8 (74)	Melbourne	10.12 (72)	Western Oval	13,000	23 July 1949
Essendon	13.17 (95)	St Kilda	9.10 (64)	Windy Hill	9,500	23 July 1949
Richmond	8.24 (72)	North Melbourne	17.11 (113)	Punt Road Oval	19,000	23 July 1949
South Melbourne	11.15 (81)	Geelong	14.13 (97)	Lake Oval	7,500	23 July 1949
Fitzroy	10.11 (71)	Collingwood	11.15 (81)	Brunswick Street Oval	21,000	23 July 1949
Hawthorn	8.5 (53)	Carlton	9.17 (71)	Glenferrie Oval	9,000	23 July 1949

=== Round 15 ===
Home team	Home team score	Away team	Away team score	Venue	Crowd	Date
Melbourne	12.7 (79)	South Melbourne	9.11 (65)	MCG	14,500	30 July 1949
Collingwood	16.23 (119)	Hawthorn	5.6 (36)	Victoria Park	9,500	30 July 1949
Carlton	11.16 (82)	Essendon	17.11 (113)	Princes Park	26,500	30 July 1949
St Kilda	13.11 (89)	Richmond	9.14 (68)	Junction Oval	10,000	30 July 1949
North Melbourne	8.14 (62)	Footscray	8.11 (59)	Arden Street Oval	14,000	30 July 1949
Geelong	13.9 (87)	Fitzroy	6.7 (43)	Kardinia Park	17,500	30 July 1949

=== Round 16 ===
Home team	Home team score	Away team	Away team score	Venue	Crowd	Date
Footscray	10.14 (74)	South Melbourne	8.10 (58)	Western Oval	10,000	6 August 1949
Fitzroy	10.19 (79)	Hawthorn	8.17 (65)	Brunswick Street Oval	4,000	6 August 1949
North Melbourne	9.10 (64)	Melbourne	8.10 (58)	Arden Street Oval	20,000	6 August 1949
St Kilda	10.9 (69)	Geelong	8.12 (60)	Junction Oval	12,000	6 August 1949
Richmond	7.14 (56)	Essendon	11.12 (78)	Punt Road Oval	16,000	6 August 1949
Collingwood	7.16 (58)	Carlton	7.13 (55)	Victoria Park	28,000	6 August 1949

=== Round 17 ===
Home team	Home team score	Away team	Away team score	Venue	Crowd	Date
Melbourne	15.16 (106)	St Kilda	7.10 (52)	MCG	18,000	13 August 1949
Hawthorn	13.10 (88)	North Melbourne	9.16 (70)	Glenferrie Oval	9,000	13 August 1949
South Melbourne	9.13 (67)	Richmond	10.17 (77)	Lake Oval	10,000	13 August 1949
Footscray	13.16 (94)	Fitzroy	8.11 (59)	Western Oval	12,000	13 August 1949
Essendon	16.21 (117)	Collingwood	10.11 (71)	Windy Hill	29,000	13 August 1949
Geelong	6.11 (47)	Carlton	12.18 (90)	Kardinia Park	24,500	13 August 1949

=== Round 18 ===
Home team	Home team score	Away team	Away team score	Venue	Crowd	Date
Geelong	7.14 (56)	North Melbourne	11.16 (82)	Kardinia Park	14,500	20 August 1949
Fitzroy	6.15 (51)	Richmond	9.8 (62)	Brunswick Street Oval	6,000	20 August 1949
Collingwood	9.19 (73)	Footscray	7.14 (56)	Victoria Park	13,500	20 August 1949
Carlton	13.17 (95)	St Kilda	10.14 (74)	Princes Park	10,000	20 August 1949
South Melbourne	14.8 (92)	Hawthorn	8.14 (62)	Lake Oval	4,000	20 August 1949
Melbourne	11.10 (76)	Essendon	15.11 (101)	MCG	58,500	20 August 1949

=== Round 19 ===
Home team	Home team score	Away team	Away team score	Venue	Crowd	Date
Hawthorn	10.16 (76)	Melbourne	15.12 (102)	Glenferrie Oval	9,000	27 August 1949
Fitzroy	19.12 (126)	South Melbourne	10.17 (77)	Brunswick Street Oval	7,000	27 August 1949
Essendon	14.13 (97)	Footscray	8.13 (61)	Windy Hill	20,000	27 August 1949
Richmond	22.12 (144)	Geelong	10.15 (75)	Punt Road Oval	11,000	27 August 1949
St Kilda	11.15 (81)	Collingwood	10.12 (72)	Junction Oval	17,000	27 August 1949
North Melbourne	15.18 (108)	Carlton	7.10 (52)	Arden Street Oval	35,116	27 August 1949

== Ladder ==
(P)	Premiers
	Qualified for finals

#	Team	P	W	L	D	PF	PA	%	Pts
1	North Melbourne	19	14	5	0	1471	1235	119.1	56
2	Carlton	19	13	6	0	1679	1328	126.4	52
3	Collingwood	19	13	6	0	1616	1308	123.5	52
4	Essendon (P)	19	13	6	0	1649	1366	120.7	52
5	Melbourne	19	12	7	0	1516	1341	113.0	48
6	Richmond	19	10	9	0	1733	1485	116.7	40
7	Fitzroy	19	10	9	0	1488	1521	97.8	40
8	Geelong	19	9	10	0	1722	1540	111.8	36
9	Footscray	19	7	12	0	1211	1444	83.9	28
10	South Melbourne	19	6	13	0	1343	1669	80.5	24
11	St Kilda	19	4	15	0	1272	1730	73.5	16
12	Hawthorn	19	3	16	0	1153	1886	61.1	12

Rules for classification: 1. premiership points; 2. percentage; 3. points for
Average score: 78.3
Source: AFL Tables

== Finals series ==
=== Semi-finals ===
Team	1 Qtr	2 Qtr	3 Qtr	Final
Collingwood	2.0	4.1	6.4	8.6 (54)
Essendon	4.1	11.3	15.9	20.16 (136)
Attendance: 87,702

Team	1 Qtr	2 Qtr	3 Qtr	Final
North Melbourne	2.3	7.3	11.4	14.7 (91)
Carlton	3.5	5.9	9.10	15.13 (103)
Attendance: 70,856

=== Preliminary final ===
Team	1 Qtr	2 Qtr	3 Qtr	Final
North Melbourne	2.1	4.1	7.4	9.7 (61)
Essendon	3.2	6.8	8.10	11.12 (78)
Attendance: 69,281

=== Grand final ===
Team	1 Qtr	2 Qtr	3 Qtr	Final
Carlton	2.4	2.10	3.12	6.16 (52)
Essendon	3.3	7.7	12.15	18.17 (125)
Attendance: 88,718

== Notable events ==
- In Round 1, John Coleman of Essendon kicked 12 goals in his first VFL game; he was best on the ground. He kicked a goal with his first kick in VFL football, having taken a mark in the first seconds of the match; and he kicked a goal with his last kick of the 1949 season, in last minutes of the Grand Final, to bring his season's total to 100 goals.
- A crowd crush marred the Round 9 match between Richmond and Carlton, as close to 50,000 spectators tried to get inside. The ground was full an hour before the first bounce, and police were powerless to stop spectators trying to get in. Some spectators jumped the boundary fence and sat around the field. Remarkably, no one was seriously injured.
- In Round 12, Hawthorn scored seven goals and no behinds in its match against Essendon. This is the first time since Round 9, 1899 that a team did not score a single behind in a VFL match.
- After the Round 12 match between Melbourne & Geelong, Geelong officials claimed that Alan Hickinbotham was left on the ground for 10 minutes after breaking his leg, due to no stretchers being available.
- In Round 19, Richmond's captain-coach Jack Dyer played his last VFL game, having played 16 games for Victoria, 312 senior games for Richmond, and 12 games in Richmond Seconds over 19 VFL seasons.

== Awards ==
- The 1949 VFL Premiership team was Essendon.
- The VFL's leading goalkicker was John Coleman of Essendon with 100 goals (including 15 goals in the final series).
- The winner of the 1949 Brownlow Medal was Ron Clegg of South Melbourne with 23 votes on a countback from Colin Austen of Hawthorn (because Clegg had been best on the ground six times to Austen's five).
  - As a consequence of its 1981 decision to change its rules relating to tied Brownlow Medal contests, the AFL awarded a retrospective medal to Colin Austen in 1989.
- Hawthorn took the "wooden spoon" in 1949.
- The seconds premiership was won by Melbourne. Melbourne 17.10 (112) defeated Essendon 9.14 (68) in the Grand Final, played as a curtain-raiser to the senior Grand Final on Saturday 24 September at the Melbourne Cricket Ground.

== Sources ==
- 1949 VFL season at AFL Tables
- 1949 VFL season at Australian Football
