= Max Spittle =

Australian rules footballer

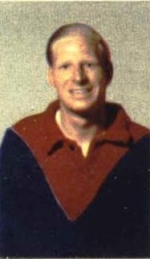

Personal information
- Full name: Maxwell Thomas Spittle
- Born: 13 June 1920
- Died: 12 June 2015 (aged 94)
- Original team: Smeaton
- Height: 175 cm (5 ft 9 in)
- Weight: 65 kg (143 lb)
- Position: Wingman

Playing career^{1}
Years	Club	Games (Goals)
1947–50	Melbourne	50 (1)
- ^{1} Playing statistics correct to the end of 1950.

Maxwell Thomas Spittle (13 June 1920 – 12 June 2015) was an Australian rules footballer who played with Melbourne in the Victorian Football League (VFL) from 1947 to 1950.

== Early and war years ==
Born at Allendale, Victoria where his parents had a farm, Spittle was the fifth of six children to William Spittle and Anne Spittle (née Hobill). Attending primary school at both Allendale and Creswick North, from 1935 to 1938 he attended the Ballarat Grammar School, where he played football, cricket and tennis.

In 1942 Spittle joined the RAAF, initially conducting flight training at No. 10 Elementary Flying Training School, Temora NSW, he was later trained as a radar operator, spending the remainder of the war stationed at Coomalie Creek Airfield, in the Northern Territory.

== Football years ==
Following the War, Spittle returned to the family farm and recommenced playing football for Smeaton. In 1947 he tried out for the Melbourne Football Club, stating he was born in 1922 to get the trial, most VFL/AFL sources still list his birth year as 1922.

He debuted midway through the 1947 season, in the same game Fred Fanning was celebrating his 100th. A wingman noted for his speed, he was a member of Melbourne's 1948 premiership team and kicked the only goal of his career in a game against Richmond earlier in the season, he played a key role in the flag win that year. He went on to play 50 games for Melbourne, retiring in 1950 he returned to Ballarat and played for several years for Redan Football Club, being instrumental in their 1952 premiership win.

== Post-football years ==
Whilst playing for Melbourne Spittle started working for Millers ropeworks, once he had finished with Melbourne he continued to work for them as a salesman, covering most of the Mallee, Wimmera and Western District. He later married Loretta and settled in Bentleigh, Victoria, he maintained strong links with the Melbourne Football Club and was a frequent sight within the members reserve at the Melbourne Cricket Ground particularly at Melbourne games.
