= Bob McKenzie (footballer) =

Australian rules footballer

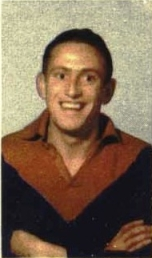
- McKenzie in 1949

Personal information
- Full name: Robert Davis McKenzie III
- Born: 19 December 1928
- Died: 4 January 2012 (aged 83); Melbourne, Victoria
- Original team: Prahran Imperials
- Height: 178 cm (5 ft 10 in)
- Weight: 72 kg (159 lb)

Playing career^{1}
| Years | Club | Games (Goals) |
| 1948–1955 | Melbourne | 125 (254) |
- ^{1} Playing statistics correct to the end of 1955.

Career highlights
- 2× AFL premiership player: 1948, 1955; 3× Melbourne leading goalkicker: 1949, 1951, 1953

Robert Davis McKenzie III (19 December 1928 – 4 January 2012) was an Australian rules football player, who played 125 games for the Melbourne Football Club in the Victorian Football League (VFL) between 1948 and 1955. McKenzie represented Victoria in interstate football on nine occasions throughout his career.

His son, Robert McKenzie played 42 games for Melbourne in the late 1960s and early 1970s.
