= Frank Bateman =

Australian rules footballer

Personal information
- Full name: James Frank Bateman
- Born: 6 June 1924; Korumburra, Victoria
- Died: 5 August 1991 (aged 67)
- Original teams: Leongatha, Victoria
- Height: 183 cm (6 ft 0 in)
- Weight: 86 kg (190 lb)

Playing career^{1}
Years	Club	Games (Goals)
1949–1950	Carlton	16 (13)
1952–1954	Preston (VFA)	37 (21)
- ^{1} Playing statistics correct to the end of 1954.

James Frank Bateman (6 June 1924 – 5 August 1991) was an Australian rules footballer in the Victorian Football League (VFL).

== Personal life ==
Bateman served as a private in the Australian Army during the Second World War.
