= Eddie Craddock =

Australian rules footballer

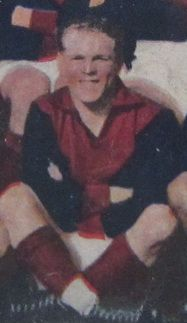

Personal information
- Full name: Edward Craddock
- Born: 30 October 1927
- Died: 3 July 2000 (aged 72)
- Height: 165 cm (5 ft 5 in)
- Weight: 67 kg (148 lb)
- Position: Forward

Playing career^{1}
Years	Club	Games (Goals)
1947–50	Melbourne	30 (45)
- ^{1} Playing statistics correct to the end of 1950.

Edward 'Eddie' Craddock (30 October 1927 – 3 July 2000) was an Australian rules footballer who played with Melbourne in the Victorian Football League (VFL) during the late 1940s.

Craddock was a forward pocket in Melbourne's 1948 premiership team. He had a good finals series, kicking three goals in the Semi Final and a further two in the Preliminary Final.
