= George Bickford =

Australian rules footballer

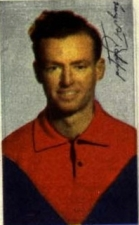

Personal information
- Full name: George Fountain Bickford
- Born: 9 January 1927; Glen Iris, Victoria
- Died: 28 November 2009 (aged 82)
- Original team: Wesley College, Melbourne
- Height: 182 cm (6 ft 0 in)
- Weight: 74 kg (163 lb)

Playing career^{1}
Years	Club	Games (Goals)
1945–1952	Melbourne	126 (17)
- ^{1} Playing statistics correct to the end of 1952.

Career highlights
- Melbourne premiership player 1948

George Fountain Bickford (9 January 1927 – 28 November 2009) was an Australian rules football player. Bickford was a member of the Melbourne premiership team in 1948 and was educated at Wesley College, Melbourne.

== Personal life ==
Bickford served as an ordinary seaman in the Royal Australian Navy during the Second World War.
