= Vic Fisher =

Australian rules footballer

Personal information
- Full name: Victor Albert Arthur Fisher
- Born: 5 August 1924; Perth, Western Australia
- Died: 8 April 1999 (aged 74); Swanbourne, Western Australia
- Original team: West Perth (WANFL)
- Debut: Round 9, 1948, Essendon vs. North Melbourne, at Windy Hill
- Height: 177 cm (5 ft 10 in)
- Weight: 83 kg (183 lb)

Playing career^{1}
| Years | Club | Games (Goals) |
| 1948–1949 | Essendon | 25 (4) |
- ^{1} Playing statistics correct to the end of 1949.

Victor Albert Arthur Fisher (5 August 1924 – 8 April 1999) was an Australian rules footballer who played for Essendon in the VFL and West Perth in the WAFL.

== Career ==
=== RAAF ===
Prior to his senior football career, Fisher served in the Royal Australian Air Force during World War II.

=== Football ===
Fisher was with Essendon when the club was at its peak, and despite playing 25 games, he only experienced two losses in his career. A wingman, he made his debut in the same game as Bill Brittingham and went on to participate in Grand Finals at the end of both of his two seasons, losing the 1948 decider to Melbourne after a replay and winning in 1949. After leaving Essendon he returned to his original club West Perth, and played in a premiership in 1951.
