= George Hassell (footballer) =

Australian rules footballer

Personal information
- Born: 5 October 1923
- Died: 25 May 2012 (aged 88)
- Original team: Ascot Vale
- Height: 173 cm (5 ft 8 in)
- Weight: 74 kg (163 lb)

Playing career^{1}
Years	Club	Games (Goals)
1946–1950	Essendon	63 (4)
- ^{1} Playing statistics correct to the end of 1950.

George Hassell (5 October 1923 – 25 May 2012) was an Australian rules footballer who played for Essendon in the Victorian Football League (VFL).

Ascot Vale recruit George Hassell played in four successive Grand Finals from 1946 to 1949. A left footed wingman, he was a premiership player in his debut season as well as in 1949, the latter as a reserve. In between he participated in the 1947 and 1948 Grand Finals, both of which Essendon lost in close contests. He represented the Victorian interstate side in 1948.
