= Bob Bradley (footballer) =

Australian rules footballer (1924–1999)

Personal information
- Full name: Robert Peter Bradley
- Born: 10 September 1924; Preston, Victoria
- Died: 4 August 1999 (aged 74)
- Original team: Moonee Ponds YCW
- Height: 177 cm (5 ft 10 in)
- Weight: 76 kg (168 lb)

Playing career^{1}
Years	Club	Games (Goals)
1947–1950	Essendon	62 (5)
1952–1953	Camberwell	38 (39 plus)
- ^{1} Playing statistics correct to the end of 1950.

Robert Peter Bradley (10 September 1924 – 4 August 1999) was an Australian rules footballer who played for Essendon in the VFL during the late 1940s.

Bradley attended St Joseph's CBC North Melbourne in the period around 1938 to 1940. While at school he developed his sporting abilities, eventually gaining places in its senior cricket team and senior football team in 1940. He served as a leading aircraftman in the Royal Australian Air Force during the Second World War.

Bradley went on to join his local club and was one of Essendon's wingmen in their strong Dick Reynolds led side. They made the grand final in each of the four seasons which Bradley played and he was part of three of them. After playing in losing grand finals in his first two seasons he was a member of Essendon's 1949 premiership team. It was the 1950 decider that he missed out on, due to a shoulder injury.
