= Bob Syme =

Australian rules footballer and coach (1924–1993)

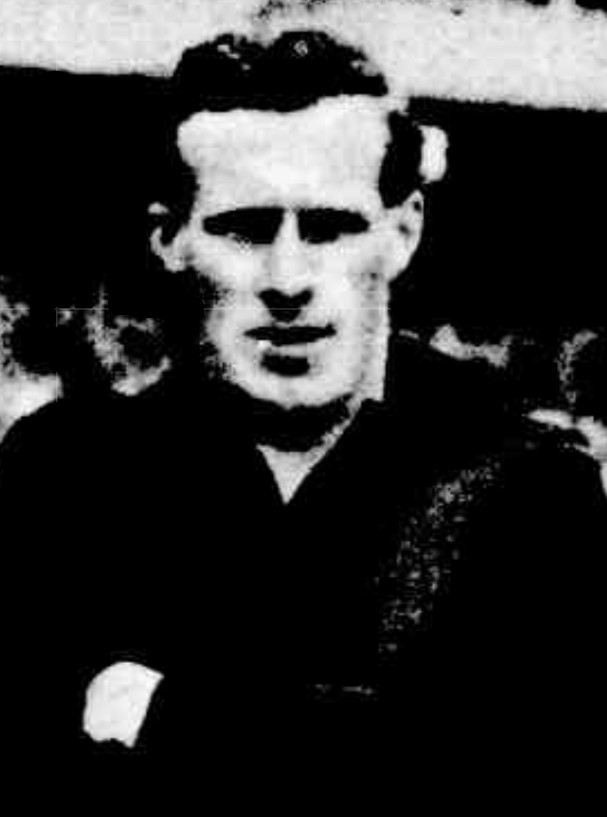
- Syme in September 1950

Personal information
- Born: 30 November 1924
- Died: 19 December 1993 (aged 69)
- Original team: Moonee Ponds YCW
- Height: 188 cm (6 ft 2 in)
- Weight: 86 kg (190 lb)

Playing career^{1}
Years	Club	Games (Goals)
1944–1953	Essendon	116 (57)

Coaching career
Years	Club	Games (W–L–D)
1974	Preston (VFA)	18 (9–9–0)
- ^{1} Playing statistics correct to the end of 1953.

Career highlights
- Essendon premiership 1949; Essendon premiership 1950; Essendon life member 1953; Essendon Football Club committee: 1953, 1981–1986

Bob Syme (30 November 1924 – 19 December 1993) was an Australian rules footballer and coach in the Victorian Football League (VFL).

== Player ==
A fast, vigorous and fiery ruckman (he was suspended for four weeks in 1950), Syme joined Essendon in 1944.

He played in:

- Essendon's 1949 premiership team — Essendon 18.17 (125) to Carlton 6.16 (52).
- Essendon's 1950 premiership team — Essendon 13.14 (92) to North Melbourne 7.12 (54).
- Essendon's 1951 Grand Final team — Geelong 11.15 (81) to Essendon 10.10 (70).

== Coach ==
He retired in 1953, and went to coach in the country.

He unsuccessfully applied for Essendon's vacant Senior coaching position in 1971; the position was awarded to John Birt.

He coached Essendon Reserves from 1971 to 1973. He coached VFA club Preston in 1974; he was replaced as coach by Dick Telford six days before the start of the 1975 season.

He served on the Essendon Football Club Committee in 1953, and from 1981 to 1986.

== See also ==
- 1949 Grand Final Teams
- 1950 Grand Final Teams
- 1951 Grand Final Teams
