= Pat Kelly (Australian footballer) =

Australian rules footballer

Personal information
- Full name: Patrick Kelly
- Born: 10 May 1923
- Died: 10 February 1999 (aged 75)
- Original team: West Melbourne
- Height: 178 cm (5 ft 10 in)
- Weight: 75 kg (165 lb)
- Position: Back pocket

Playing career^{1}
Years	Club	Games (Goals)
1945, 1948–55	North Melbourne	104 (4)
- ^{1} Playing statistics correct to the end of 1955.

Pat Kelly (10 May 1923 – 10 February 1999) was an Australian rules footballer who played for North Melbourne in the Victorian Football League (VFL).
