= Chris Lambert (footballer) =

Australian rules footballer (1920–2005)

Personal information
- Full name: Christopher Arthur Lambert
- Born: 12 March 1920; Maryborough, Victoria
- Died: 22 September 2005 (aged 85); Essendon, Victoria
- Original team: La Mascotte
- Height: 170 cm (5 ft 7 in)
- Weight: 74 kg (163 lb)

Playing career^{1}
Years	Club	Games (Goals)
1939–1951	Essendon	137 (18)
- ^{1} Playing statistics correct to the end of 1951.

Career highlights
- Essendon Premiership 1946, 1950

Christopher Arthur Lambert (12 March 1920 – 22 September 2005) was an Australian rules footballer in the Victorian Football League (VFL).

He was a member of Essendon premiership teams in 1946 and 1950.
