= Les Gardiner (Australian footballer) =

Australian rules footballer

Personal information
- Born: 25 January 1923
- Died: 26 December 2012 (aged 89)
- Original team: Brunswick United
- Height: 173 cm (5 ft 8 in)
- Weight: 75 kg (165 lb)

Playing career^{1}
Years	Club	Games (Goals)
1943–1953	Essendon	166 (0)
- ^{1} Playing statistics correct to the end of 1953.

Career highlights
- Essendon premiership player: 1946, 1949, 1950

Les Gardiner (25 January 1923 – 26 December 2012) was an Australian rules footballer who played for Essendon in the Victorian Football League (VFL).

He was a member of Essendon's 1946, 1949 and 1950 premiership teams.
