= Bill Brittingham =

Australian rules footballer

Personal information
- Born: 5 September 1923
- Died: 18 June 1996 (aged 72)
- Original team: Warrnambool (HFL)
- Height: 183 cm (6 ft 0 in)
- Weight: 83 kg (183 lb)

Playing career^{1}
Years	Club	Games (Goals)
1943–1952	Essendon	172 (181)
- ^{1} Playing statistics correct to the end of 1952.

Career highlights
- Essendon premiership player: 1946, 1949 & 1950; Essendon best and fairest runner-up: 1950

Bill Brittingham (5 September 1923 – 18 June 1996) was an Australian rules footballer in the Victorian Football League (VFL).

He played in the Essendon premiership teams of 1946, 1949 and 1950. He originally played at full forward, winning the league goal kicking award in 1946, then switched full back in his latter years.
