= Ron McEwin =

Australian rules footballer

Personal information
- Full name: Ronald Leslie McEwin
- Born: 1 January 1928; Richmond, Victoria
- Died: 14 March 2007 (aged 79); Noble Park, Victoria
- Original team: Moonee Ponds West PS
- Height: 169 cm (5 ft 7 in)
- Weight: 66 kg (146 lb)

Playing career^{1}
Years	Club	Games (Goals)
1948–1952	Essendon	77 (76)
- ^{1} Playing statistics correct to the end of 1952.

Career highlights
- Essendon Premiership 1949, 1950

Ronald Leslie McEwin (1 January 1928 – 14 March 2007) was an Australian rules footballer in the Victorian Football League (VFL).

Ron McEwin was a member of the Essendon premiership teams in 1949 and 1950.

In 1953 McEwin moved to Mildura as captain-coach of the South Mildura team and he later took up umpiring in the Sunraysia Football League.
