= Ted Leehane =

Australian rules footballer

Personal information
- Full name: Edward Joseph Leehane
- Born: 2 June 1923; Brunswick, Victoria
- Died: 18 November 2014 (aged 91)
- Original team: Brunswick CYMS (CYMSFA)

Playing career^{1}
Years	Club	Games (Goals)
1942–1950	Essendon	83 (140)
- ^{1} Playing statistics correct to the end of 1950.

Career highlights
- Essendon premiership player: 1942, 1949 & 1950; Essendon best and fairest runner-up: 1946

Edward Joseph Leehane (2 June 1923 – 18 November 2014) was an Australian rules footballer who played in the Victorian Football League (VFL).

He was a member of the Essendon premiership teams in 1942, 1949 and 1950.

Leehane later captain-coached Mansfield in the Waranga North East Football Association from 1951 to 1956, which included premierships in 1951, 1953, 1954 and 1955 and runners up in 1952.
