= Dick Reynolds =

Australian rules footballer, born 1915

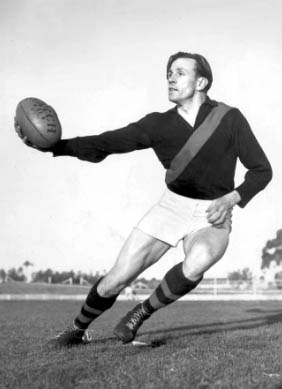

Personal information
- Full name: Richard Sylvanus Reynolds
- Nickname: King Richard
- Born: 20 June 1915
- Died: 2 September 2002 (aged 87)
- Original team: Woodlands (EDFL)
- Height: 179 cm (5 ft 10 in)
- Weight: 82 kg (181 lb)
- Position: Midfielder/Small forward

Playing career^{1}
Years	Club	Games (Goals)
1933–1951	Essendon	320 (442)

Representative team honours
Years	Team	Games (Goals)
	Victoria	19 (19)

Coaching career^{3}
Years	Club	Games (W–L–D)
1939–1960	Essendon (VFL)	415 (275–134–6)
1961–1963	West Torrens (SANFL)	58 (37–19–2)
- ^{1} Playing statistics correct to the end of 1951.^{3} Coaching statistics correct as of 1963.

Career highlights
- 4× Essendon Premiership player: (1942, 1946, 1949, 1950); 3× Brownlow Medal: (1934, 1937, 1938); 7× W. S. Crichton Medal: (1934, 1936, 1937, 1938, 1939, 1942, 1943); Essendon captain: (1939–1950); Essendon leading goalkicker 1943; Australian Football Hall of Fame Legend 1996; AFL Team of the Century (half forward flank); Essendon Team of the Century (rover)

Richard Sylvannus Reynolds (20 June 1915 – 2 September 2002) was an Australian rules footballer who played for the Essendon Football Club in the Victorian Football League (VFL).

Reynolds is one of four footballers to have won three Brownlow Medals, with the others being Haydn Bunton Sr., Bob Skilton and Ian Stewart. Revered by Essendon supporters, he was often referred to simply as "King Richard".

== Family ==
The son of William Meader Reynolds (1886–1940) and Mary James Reynolds, née Thompson (1885–1941), and one of seven children, Richard Sylvannus Reynolds was born on 20 June 1915. He died on 2 September 2002. He was the brother of Tom Reynolds, the cousin of Richmond champion player and coach Max Oppy, and the grandfather of Joel Reynolds.

== Early life and career ==
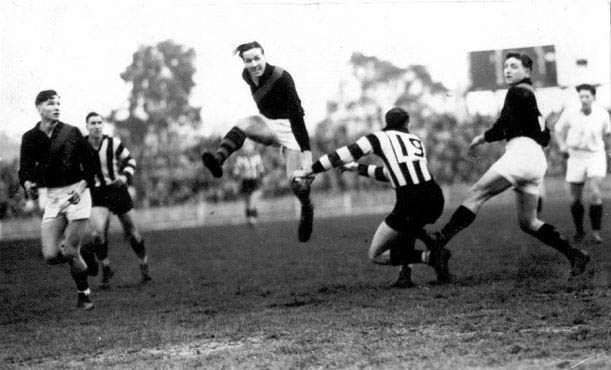
Reynolds in action.

Reynolds grew up supporting Carlton and sold lollies outside Princes Park on match days.

When Reynolds won his first Brownlow Medal in 1934, Fitzroy champion Haydn Bunton Sr., whom Reynolds had narrowly beaten to win the award, was the first person to telegraph his congratulations, a sporting gesture that Reynolds deeply appreciated.

Reynolds would normally wear the number three guernsey throughout his playing career with Essendon, but had to wear the number four guernsey during one match of the 1937 VFL season when he left his uniform at home.

In July 1944 Reynolds surpassed Billy Griffith club record of 187 games.

In June 1947, it was announced that Reynolds would start writing about football for the now-defunct Melbourne newspaper The Argus.

Like many footballers, Reynolds was also a noted cricketer. He was a successful medium-fast bowler for Essendon Cricket Club but gave up the game when it started to interfere with football. In January 1949, he made a return to district cricket when Essendon batsman Ken Meuleman was picked for State duty.

After being re-elected yet again as player-coach by the Essendon committee in February 1949, Reynolds guided the Bombers to the Grand Final against Carlton, which they won by 73 points. Reynolds, who was playing his 299th game, described it afterwards as "the best Essendon performance he could remember."

1950 was a big year for Reynolds, first he played his 300th game in round one, then later on he passed the 311 game record of Richmond champion Jack Dyer. Finally he led his team to victory in the 1950 VFL Grand Final.

In the lead up to the 1951 VFL Grand Final a raft of injuries caused the selectors to include Reynolds into the side as 19th man. With the game slipping away from Essendon, Reynolds came on for the final quarter. He was instrumental in helping score two goals but Geelong won by 11 points. It was the last and game number 320 for champion. He held the record until 1971 when Ted Whitten played his 321st game.

In 1961 he handed over the coaching duties to John Coleman. He would move to Adelaide and for three years coach West Torrens 1961 to 1963.

== Champions of Essendon ==
In 2002, an Essendon panel ranked him first in their Champions of Essendon list of the 25 greatest players ever to have played for Essendon.

Just three days before his death, after being given a standing ovation by the crowd at the announcement dinner, at which he was named the greatest Essendon player of all time, Reynolds was visibly moved and stated: "I don't deserve this honour... Bill Hutchison was the best player I ever saw."

His family's link with Essendon continued when his grandson Joel Reynolds was selected by the club in the 2001 AFL draft. He made his debut in Round 3, 2002, against Brisbane at the Gabba, with Dick watching from the stands.

== Death ==
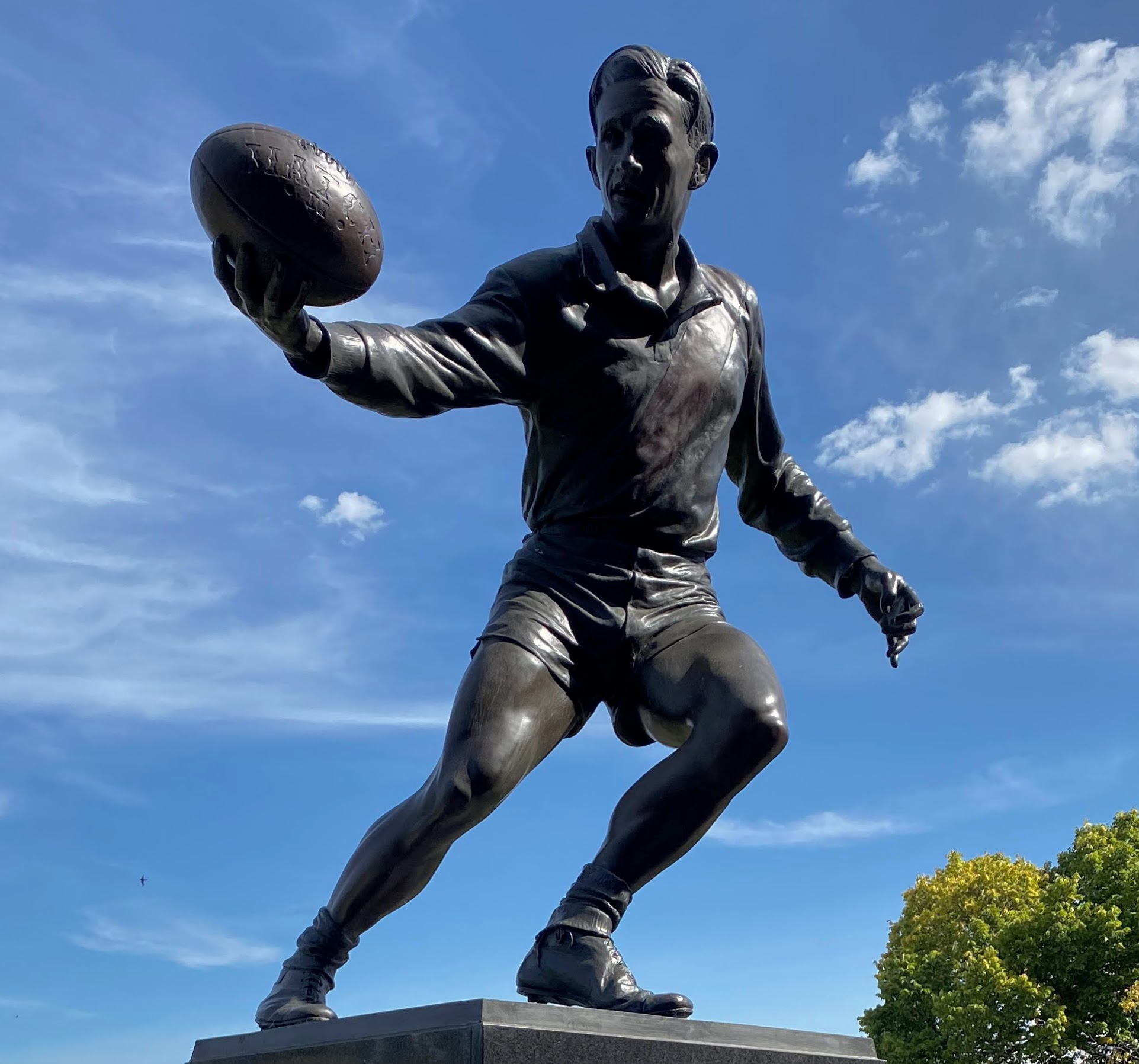
Statue at Melbourne Cricket Ground

Reynolds' funeral was held at St Paul's Cathedral, Melbourne, on 6 September 2002. After the service, the hearse made its way to Windy Hill, where Essendon fans had gathered to farewell their greatest player one last time.

A statue in his honour was erected in 2004 at the Parade of Champions at the Melbourne Cricket Ground.

== Brownlow Medals ==
In August 2017, Reynolds' family sold his three Brownlow Medals, putting them up as a single lot by auction house Mossgreen with an estimated sale price of A$200,000 to $250,000. Shortly before the auction, the family accepted a private offer from the Essendon Football Club, and the medals did not go under the hammer. The archived auction listing records a price realised of between $200,000 and $250,000. Completion of the sale was delayed after Mossgreen entered voluntary administration in December 2017, but the medals were released to Essendon in April 2018 for permanent display.

== Bibliography ==
- Maplestone, M. (1996). Flying Higher: History of the Essendon Football Club 1872–1996. Essendon: Essendon Football Club. ISBN 0-9591740-2-8.
- Miller, W.; Petraitis, V.; Jeremiah, V. (1997). The Great John Coleman. Cheltenham: Nivar Press. ISBN 0-646-31616-8.
- Ross, John, ed. (1996). 100 Years of Australian Football 1897–1996: The Complete Story of the AFL, All the Big Stories, All the Great Pictures, All the Champions, Every AFL Season Reported. Ringwood: Viking. ISBN 0-670-86814-0.
- Holmesby, Russell; Main, Jim (2002). The Encyclopedia of AFL Footballers: every AFL/VFL player since 1897 (4th ed.). Melbourne, Victoria: Crown Content. p. 546. ISBN 1-74095-001-1.
