= Bob McClure (footballer) =

Australian rules footballer

Personal information
- Full name: Robert Johnstone McClure
- Born: 5 June 1925; Gunyah, Victoria
- Died: 18 June 2003 (aged 78)
- Original team: Essendon Stars
- Height: 188 cm (6 ft 2 in)
- Weight: 90 kg (198 lb)

Playing career^{1}
| Years | Club | Games (Goals) |
| 1946–1951 | Essendon | 90 (17) |
- ^{1} Playing statistics correct to the end of 1951.

Robert Johnstone "Bluey" McClure (5 June 1925 – 18 June 2003) was an Australian rules footballer who played with Essendon in the VFL.

A ruckman, McClure served in the navy during World War II prior to joining Essendon. He became a key component in a successful Essendon side, winning premierships in 1946, 1949 and 1950. A knee injury forced him to retire during the 1951 season.
