= 1941 VFL grand final =

Grand final of the 1941 Victorian Football League season

1941 VFL Grand Final

Melbourne	Essendon
19.13 (127)	13.20 (98)
	1	2	3	4
MEL	6.6 (42)	11.9 (75)	14.11 (95)	19.13 (127)
ESS	1.1 (7)	2.6 (18)	6.12 (48)	13.20 (98)
- Date: 27 September 1941
- Stadium: Melbourne Cricket Ground
- Attendance: 77,746

The 1941 VFL Grand Final was an Australian rules football game contested between the Melbourne Football Club and Essendon Football Club, held at the Melbourne Cricket Ground in Melbourne on 27 September 1941. It was the 43rd annual Grand Final of the Victorian Football League, staged to determine the premiers for the 1941 VFL season. The match, attended by 79,687 spectators, was won by Melbourne by a margin of 29 points, marking that club's fifth premiership victory.

By claiming their third successive premiership, Melbourne joined Carlton and Collingwood as the only clubs to achieve the feat.

Melbourne's team was understrength as they had been depleted by the war. Syd Anderson, Harold Ball, Ron Barassi and Keith Truscott, who were members of the previous season's premiership, missed the Grand Final as they were serving their country and all died in World War II.

There were sets of brothers on each team, with the Cordner brothers of Melbourne taking on the Reynolds brothers of Essendon.

== Teams ==
Melbourne	Essendon

Melbourne
B:	Richie Emselle	Shane McGrath	Don Cordner
HB:	Col McLean	Ted Cordner	Wally Lock
C:	Syd Anderson	Allan La Fontaine (c)	Stan Heal
HF:	Maurie Gibb	Ron Baggott	Ray Wartman
F:	Jack O'Keefe	Norm Smith	Gerry Daly
Foll:	Jack Mueller	Adrian Dullard	Percy Beames
Res:	Warren Lewis		
Coach:	Frank 'Checker' Hughes		

Essendon
B:	Elton Plummer	Cec Ruddell	Fred Green
HB:	Bob Flanigan	Wally Buttsworth	Allan Hird
C:	Ernie Coward	Harold Lambert	Jack Caesar
HF:	Gordon Lane	Les Griggs	Murray Exelby
F:	Jack Cassin	Tom Reynolds	Ted Bryce
Foll:	Hugh Torney	Gordon Abbott	Dick Reynolds (c)
Res:	Ted Regan		
Coach:	Dick Reynolds		

== Statistics ==
=== Goalkickers ===
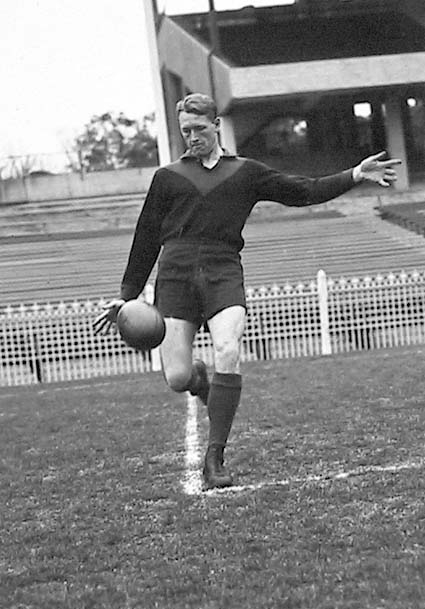
Don Cordner

Melbourne

- Beames 6
- Mueller 3
- Smith 3
- Wartman 2
- Anderson 1
- Daly 1
- Dullard 1
- Gibb 1
- O'Keefe 1

Essendon

- T.Reynolds 3
- Bryce 2
- D.Reynolds 2
- Abbott 1
- Cassin 1
- Exelby 1
- Lane 1
- Regan 1
- Torney 1

== See also ==
- 1941 VFL season
