= 1946 VFL grand final =

Grand final of the 1946 Victorian Football League season

1946 VFL Grand final
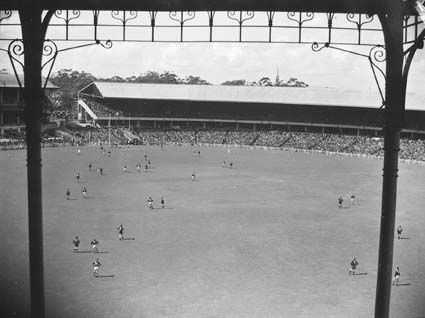
- The 1946 VFL Grand Final in progress.

Essendon	Melbourne
22.18 (150)	13.9 (87)
	1	2	3	4
ESS	7.2 (44)	9.7 (61)	20.15 (135)	22.18 (150)
MEL	8.3 (51)	10.4 (64)	11.5 (71)	13.9 (87)
- Date: 5 October 1946
- Stadium: Melbourne Cricket Ground
- Attendance: 73,743
- Umpires: Thomas Bride

The 1946 VFL grand final was an Australian rules football game contested between the Essendon Football Club and Melbourne Football Club, held at the Melbourne Cricket Ground on 5 October 1946. It was the 48th annual grand final of the Victorian Football League, staged to determine the premiers for the 1946 VFL season. The match was attended by 73,743 spectators.

The game was won by Essendon by a margin of 63 points, marking that club's 8th VFL premiership. The match was marked by Essendon's dominant third quarter, in which it scored a grand final record of 11.8 (74) to turn a close half-time deficit into a match-winning lead.

== Background ==
Essendon won the minor premiership in the 1946 season by an eight-point margin, with a 15–4 win–loss record. Melbourne had finished fourth, as one of three clubs with a 13–6 win–loss record.

In the finals, Essendon had drawn the second semi-final against Collingwood, then won the replay the following week by 19 points to qualify for the grand final after a week's break. Melbourne defeated Footscray in the first semi-final by 18 points, then defeated Collingwood in the preliminary final by 13 points to qualify. Owing to the replayed semi-final, the grand final was staged on 5 October, one week later than originally scheduled.

The clubs met twice during the home-and-away season, each winning its home game: Essendon by 56 points in Round 3 and Melbourne by five points in Round 14.

The match was the first grand final played at the Melbourne Cricket Ground since 1941, it having been appropriated for military use during World War II. The ground had not been available for football until Round 17, and Melbourne (which usually played its home games at the ground) had been playing at the nearby Punt Road Oval for much of the season.

This was the first of six successive grand final appearances by Essendon between 1946 and 1951, from which it won three premierships.

== Match summary ==
The match was played in fine weather. A breeze favoured the Richmond end of the ground, to which Essendon kicked in the first and third quarters.

=== First quarter ===
Melbourne opened the game the stronger, kicking the first four goals of the game: the first came inside the first six seconds of the game, with the ruck tap-out going to Len Dockett, who passed to Adrian Dullard, who goaled from a snap shot; the second from a mark and set shot by Fred Fanning; the third from a mark by Jack Mueller; and the fourth after Alby Rodda roved a hit-out. Fanning won several decisive ruck contests in setting up his team's early goals inside the first ten minutes. Essendon fought back with the next two goals; Bill Brittingham kicked their first from a snap shot; and Gordon Lane taking a strong mark to kick his first goal from a set shot. Soon after, a fumble by the Essendon defenders allowed Ernie O'Rourke to kick Melbourne's fifth goal, pushing the advantage back to twenty points. Melbourne's sixth goal came from Mueller, after receiving a handpass from Norm Smith.

Essendon then fought back strongly, its followers involved in several passages of play. Dick Reynolds scored Essendon's third goal after receiving a handpass from Hutchison; and Hutchison kicked the fourth goal from a long set shot. Lane then kicked two goals to bring Essendon level: first from a snap near the boundary line, and then from a set shot. Melbourne re-took the lead after Mueller converted a set shot after a big pack mark, and Essendon equalised again with a roving effort from Reynolds. On the final bell, a free kick against Gordon Abbott saw Mueller kick Melbourne's eighth goal to pull ahead at quarter time.

After a high scoring first quarter Melbourne 8.3 (51) led Essendon 7.2 (44) by seven points. Jack Mueller had already kicked four goals for Melbourne, and Gordon Lane three goals for Essendon. Melbourne had slightly the better of the aerial battle, taking 18 marks to Essendon's 12, but the overall play was very even. Hutchison's roving work had been critical in bringing Essendon back into the game, after Fanning's early ruckwork had given Melbourne the lead.

=== Second quarter ===
After the high scoring first quarter, the second was much more tensely fought. Essendon attacked first, and kicked the first goal to take the lead, when Bill Pearson was able to get the ball to Hutchison while being tackled, Hutchison then kicking a goal from a snap shot. A turnover in Melbourne's backline ended with a mark to Lane, who kicked his fourth goal to give Essendon its first lead of the game. A free kick to Mueller for an illegal bump drew boos from the crowd, but resulted in a behind; another free to Mueller shortly afterwards resulted in a goal and saw Melbourne re-take the lead. Essendon continued its attacking, missing several close chance, while Melbourne struggled to get shots on goal. Late in the quarter, Gordon Bowman gathered a broken contest in the Melbourne forward line and kicked Melbourne's tenth goal to regain the lead.

At half time, Melbourne 10.4 (64) led Essendon 9.7 (61). Essendon had kicked 2.5 to Melbourne's 2.1 in the quarter, and had been overall the stronger team in all aspects – particularly speed, ruck work and co-operation – but had been unable to converting opportunities in front of goal. The game had developed into a tough and rugged contest, with lots of solid bumps and physical contests. Even at this stage, Melbourne players who had been brilliant in the team's strong opening were beginning to wane.

=== Third quarter ===
Essendon took complete control of the game in the third quarter. Their difficulties converting in front of goal persisted early in the quarter, with their first five scoring shots all registering behinds from a range of hurried shots at goal, but the Essendon half-forward line was able to prevent Melbourne from rebounding, providing sustained attack. Then came a quick flurry of goals to Essendon: first to Brittingham from a set shot; then Bob McClure from a mark near the goal post; then a goal to Harry Equid; and finally a goal from a running drop-kick by Hutchison to open a 26-point lead.

Melbourne put up a brief period of resistance, and at the 16 minute mark broke the run of Essendon goals when Dullard kicked his second goal from a free kick. But this was short-lived as Essendon kicked the next seven goals of the quarter: Lane kicked his fifth goal, after finding himself on the end of a rebound from the backline; Keith Rawle was on the end of a chain of attacking handpasses to kick his first goal; Reynolds roved his second goal from a broken marking contest; Jack Cassin converted a set shot for his first goal; Lane kicked his sixth from a snap shot; Brittingham kicked a goal from a brilliant wide-angle snap shot; and finally McClure kicked his second goal of the quarter from a snap shot.

At three quarter time, Essendon 20.15 (135) led Melbourne 11.5 (71) by 64 points. Essendon completely dominated the quarter, kicked 11.8, which set and as of 2024 still holds the record for the highest team score in any quarter of a VFL/AFL grand final.

=== Final quarter ===
With the result beyond doubt, and Melbourne losing two players – Len Dockett and captain Norm Smith – to injury at three quarter time, and the final quarter was played with little intent, but quite a lot of intensity with some rough play and two reports from the umpire. Brittingham kicked the first goal for Essendon early in the quarter. After 21 minutes had elapsed, Dullard scored a goal for Melbourne. The two spearheads Lane and Mueller each added one late goal – their seventh and sixth respectively – before the final siren. Essendon 22.18 (150) defeated Melbourne 13.9 (87) by 63 points.

=== Summary ===
Essendon's Gordon Lane was considered the best player on the ground his seven-goal performance, with sportswriters in all four major newspapers naming him best. Essendon rovers Bill Hutchison and Dick Reynolds and full back Cec Ruddell were both also singled out for praise, alongside fellow defenders Herbie Tonkes and Wally Buttsworth. Despite the record score his backline had conceded, Melbourne full-back Shane McGrath was among Melbourne's best players; rover Alby Rodda and six-goal full forward Jack Mueller were also singled out by sportswriters.

Essendon's final score of 22.18 (150) and winning margin of 63 points both set new VFL grand final records, which stood until 1972 and 1949 respectively. The loss was Melbourne's first ever in a grand final, having won its five previous appearances. With his second goal early in the second third quarter, Essendon forward Bill Brittingham overtook Collingwood's Des Fothergill to finish the complete season as the league's leading goalkicker. At the tribunal following the match, Frank Kennedy was suspended for four weeks for striking; the misconduct charge against Adrian Dullard was dismissed.

=== Scorecard ===
Grand Final
Saturday, 5 October	Essendon	def.	Melbourne	Melbourne Cricket Ground (crowd: 73,743)
7.2 (44); 9.7 (61); 20.15 (135); 22.18 (150)	Q1; Q2; Q3; Final	8.3 (51); 10.4 (64); 11.5 (71); 13.9 (87)	Umpires: Thomas Bride
Lane 7, Brittingham 4, Hutchison 3, Reynolds 3, McClure 2, Equid, Rawle, Cassin	Goals	Mueller 6, Dullard 3, Bowman, Fanning, O'Rourke, Rodda
Lane, Hutchison, Ruddell, Reynolds, Tonkes, Buttsworth	Best	McGrath, McLean, Deans, Rodda
Buttsworth (rib), Pearson (ankle)	Injuries	Smith (knee), Dockett (illness), McGrath (cut eye)
Reports	Kennedy, for striking Pearson in the final quarter Dullard, for misconduct (kneeing) Bushby in the final quarter

== Teams ==
Essendon	Melbourne

Essendon
B:	Les Gardiner	Cec Ruddell	Perc Bushby
HB:	Herbie Tonkes	Wally Buttsworth	Harold Lambert
C:	George Hassell	Bill Pearson	Albert Harper
HF:	Harry Equid	Gordon Lane	Dick Reynolds (c)
F:	Bob McClure	Bill Brittingham	Keith Rawle
Foll:	Gordon Abbott	Jack Cassin	Bill Hutchison
Res:	Jack Jones	Chris Lambert	
Coach:	Dick Reynolds		

Melbourne
B:	Billy Deans	Shane McGrath	Don Cordner
HB:	Col McLean	Ted Cordner	Wally Lock
C:	George Bickford	Len Dockett	Roy Stabb
HF:	Gordon Bowman	Fred Fanning	Jim Mitchell
F:	Adrian Dullard	Norm Smith (c)	Ernie O'Rourke
Foll:	Jack Mueller	Stan Rule	Alby Rodda
Res:	Frank Kennedy	Arnold Byfield	
Coach:	'Checker' Hughes		
