= 1943 VFL grand final =

Grand final of the 1943 Victorian Football League season

1943 VFL Grand Final

Essendon	Richmond
11.15 (81)	12.14 (86)
	1	2	3	4
ESS	2.4 (16)	4.9 (33)	8.13 (61)	11.15 (81)
RIC	4.2 (26)	6.5 (41)	8.8 (56)	12.14 (86)
- Date: 25 September 1943
- Stadium: Princes Park
- Attendance: 42,100

The 1943 VFL Grand Final was an Australian rules football game contested between the Richmond Football Club and Essendon Football Club, held at the Princes Park in Melbourne on 25 September 1943. It was the 45th annual Grand Final of the Victorian Football League, staged to determine the premiers for the 1943 VFL season. The match, attended by 42,100 spectators, was won by Richmond by a margin of 5 points, marking that club's fifth VFL premiership victory.

== Teams ==
Richmond	Essendon

Richmond
B:	Raymond Steele	Ron Durham	Jack Scott
HB:	Ray Hunt	Leo Maguire	Bill Perkins
C:	Leo Merrett	Jack Broadstock	Bert Edwards
HF:	Roy Quinn	Brian Randall	Bernie Waldron
F:	Max Oppy	Bob Bawden	Dick Harris
Foll:	Jack Dyer (c)	Arthur Barr-Kemp	Laurie Cahill
Res:	Len Ablett		
Coach:	Jack Dyer		

Essendon
B:	Elton Plummer	Cec Ruddell	Perc Bushby
HB:	Jack Cockburn	Wally Buttsworth	Allan Hird
C:	Bill Hutchison	Les Gardiner	Ernie Coward
HF:	Laurie Dearle	Gordon Lane	Gordon Abbott
F:	Tom Reynolds	Jack Cassin	Keith Rawle
Foll:	Hugh Torney	Norm Betson	Dick Reynolds (c)
Res:	Gil Langley		
Coach:	Dick Reynolds		

- Umpire – Eric Hawkins

== Statistics ==
=== Goalkickers ===
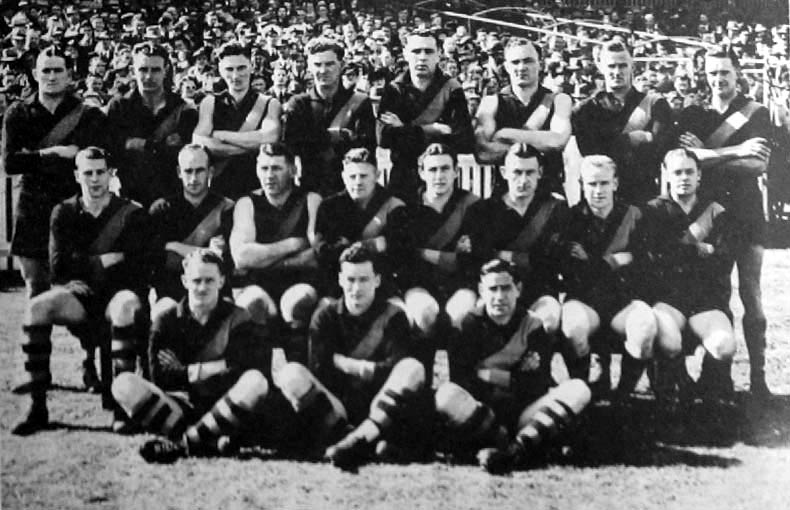
Richmond FC, premier team

Richmond:

- D Harris 7
- J Dyer 3
- B Bawden 1
- J Broadstock 1

Essendon:

- T Reynolds 7
- H Torney 2
- G Lane 1
- K Rawle 1

== See also ==
- 1943 VFL season
