= 1942 VFL grand final =

Grand final of the 1942 Victorian Football League season

1942 VFL Grand Final

Essendon	Richmond
19.18 (132)	11.13 (79)
	1	2	3	4
ESS	2.6 (18)	8.14 (62)	14.16 (100)	19.18 (132)
RIC	2.4 (16)	4.4 (28)	5.10 (40)	11.13 (79)
- Date: 19 September 1942
- Stadium: Princes Park
- Attendance: 49,000

The 1942 VFL Grand Final was an Australian rules football game contested between the Essendon Football Club and Richmond Football Club, held at the Princes Park in Melbourne on 19 September 1942. It was the 44th annual Grand Final of the Victorian Football League, staged to determine the premiers for the 1942 VFL season. The match, attended by 49,000 spectators, was won by Essendon by a margin of 53 points, marking that club's seventh premiership victory and first since 1924.

== Teams ==
Essendon	Richmond

Essendon
B:	Elton Plummer	Cec Ruddell	Perc Bushby
HB:	Bob Flanigan	Wally Buttsworth	Allan Hird
C:	Ernie Coward	Laurie Dearle	Jack Caesar
HF:	Gordon Abbott	Gordon Lane	Bill Hutchison
F:	Tom Reynolds	Ted Leehane	Murray Exelby
Foll:	Hugh Torney	Jack Cassin	Dick Reynolds (c)
Res:	Sid Silk		
Coach:	Dick Reynolds		

Richmond
B:	Danny Guinane	George Smeaton	Joe Reilly
HB:	Jack Scott	Jack Sullivan	Raymond Steele
C:	Leo Merrett	Bernie Waldron	Bert Edwards
HF:	Brian Randall	Jack Symons	Bob Hay
F:	Bob Bawden	Jack Titus	Fred Burge
Foll:	Jack Dyer (c)	Bill Morris	Dick Harris
Res:	Des Martin		
Coach:	Jack Dyer		

- Umpire – Eric Hawkins

== Statistics ==
=== Goalkickers ===
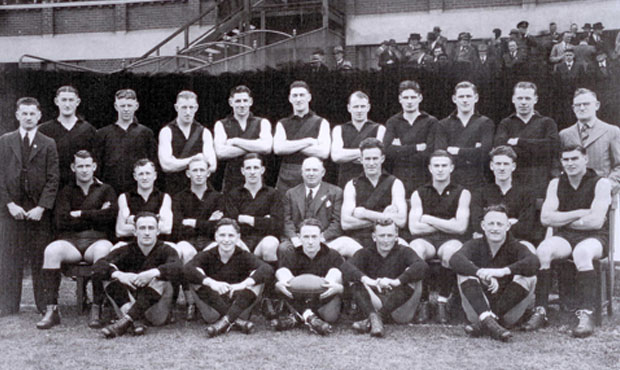
Essendon FC, premiers

Essendon:

- G Lane 6
- D Reynolds 4
- J Cassin 3
- L Dearle 2
- M Exelby 2
- G Abbott 1
- T Reynolds 1

Richmond:

- D Harris 3
- J Dyer 2
- J Titus 2
- B Hay 1
- D Martin 1
- L Merrett 1
- B Randall 1

== See also ==
- 1942 VFL season
