= Les Gibbs =

Australian rules footballer

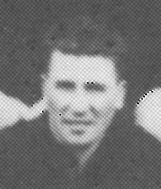

Personal information
- Full name: Leslie Gibbs
- Born: 10 August 1918; Carlton, Victoria
- Died: 10 April 1976 (aged 57); Tootgarook, Victoria
- Original team: Nyora
- Height: 163 cm (5 ft 4 in)
- Weight: 63.5 kg (140 lb)

Playing career^{1}
Years	Club	Games (Goals)
1939, 1941–44	Melbourne	13 (8)
- ^{1} Playing statistics correct to the end of 1944.

Leslie Gibbs (10 August 1918 – 10 April 1976) was an Australian rules footballer who played with Melbourne in the Victorian Football League (VFL).

== Family ==
The son of George Gibbs (1879-1943), and Ada Alice Gibbs (1879-1962), née Musgrove, Leslie Gibbs was born at Carlton, Victoria on 10 August 1918. His brother, George Gibbs (1905-1987), played with Fitzroy and Collingwood.

He married Gladwys Lesley Clements in 1942.

== Football ==
=== Melbourne (VFL) ===
Recruited from Parkdale Football Club in 1939, he showed good form in the Seconds, and was selected to play his first match for the Melbourne First XVIII, against Richmond, at the Punt Road Oval, on 8 July 1939, in place of the suspended Ron Barassi.

In a career interrupted by his military service — he was not listed in 1940 — he played a total of 13 senior games with Melbourne (including 9 of the team's last 10 matches in 1942).

==== VFL "Patriotic" Carnival (1941) ====
In 1941, the VFL postponed its Round 5 matches and conducted a "patriotic" lightning carnival at the Melbourne Cricket Ground on Saturday 24 May 1941. Attended by 19,572 people, it raised £1,526 for the war effort.

Gibbs was selected as rover/forward-pocket in the Melbourne team — from which a significant number of talented footballers were missing: Bill Baxter (ankle); Geoff/Jeff Baldwin (knee); Adrian Dullard (thigh); Fred Fanning (knee); Dick Hingston (ill); Allan La Fontaine (Infected leg); Wally Lock (ankle); Jack Mueller (in Sydney with the VFL team, playing against NSW); Hugh Murnane (knee); Jack O'Keefe (thigh); Danny Powell (ankle); Alby Rodda (broken leg); and Ray Wartman (knee).

Collingwood won the carnival, defeating Melbourne, in fading light, on a bitterly cold day, and heavy rain, by a point, 3.2 (20) to 3.1 (19); and Gibbs was one of Melbourne's best players in each of its four carnival games.

=== Preston (VFA) ===
Cleared from Melbourne to Preston in 1946, he played in three matches, before being released to Brunswick.

== Military service ==
In July 1940, nine months after the outbreak of the Second World War, Gibbs enlisted in the Australian Army as a private, being discharged after two months of service. In 1942, he joined the Royal Australian Air Force, ending the war as a corporal.
