= 1940 VFL grand final =

Grand final of the 1940 Victorian Football League season

1940 VFL Grand Final

Melbourne	Richmond
15.17 (107)	10.8 (68)
	1	2	3	4
MEL	4.8 (32)	10.11 (71)	13.15 (93)	15.17 (107)
RIC	3.0 (18)	4.2 (26)	5.4 (34)	10.8 (68)
- Date: 28 September 1940
- Stadium: Melbourne Cricket Ground
- Attendance: 70,330

The 1940 VFL Grand Final was an Australian rules football game contested between the Melbourne Football Club and Richmond Football Club, held at the Melbourne Cricket Ground in Melbourne on 28 September 1940. It was the 42nd annual Grand Final of the Victorian Football League, staged to determine the premiers for the 1940 VFL season. The match, attended by 70,330 spectators, was won by Melbourne by a margin of 39 points, marking that club's fourth premiership victory.

This was Melbourne's second successive premiership, having defeated Collingwood in the 1939 VFL Grand Final.

== Teams ==
Melbourne	Richmond

Melbourne
B:	Richie Emselle	Frank Roberts	Harold Ball
HB:	Col McLean	Gordon Jones	Dick Hingston
C:	Ray Wartman	Allan La Fontaine (c)	Syd Anderson
HF:	Maurie Gibb	Ron Baggott	Keith Truscott
F:	Fred Fanning	Norm Smith	Alby Rodda
Foll:	Jack Mueller	Jack O'Keefe	Percy Beames
Res:	Ron Barassi		
Coach:	Checker Hughes		

Richmond
B:	Kevin O'Neill	George Smeaton	Jack Symons
HB:	Raymond Steele	Ian Hull	Jack Cotter
C:	Alan McDonald	Bernie Waldron	Bert Edwards
HF:	Ray Martin	Jack Crane	Laird Smith
F:	Bob Bawden	Jack Titus	Dick Harris
Foll:	Percy Bentley (c)	Jack Dyer	Jack Quinn
Res:	Leo Merrett		
Coach:	Percy Bentley		

- Umpire – Alan Coward

== Statistics ==
=== Goalkickers ===
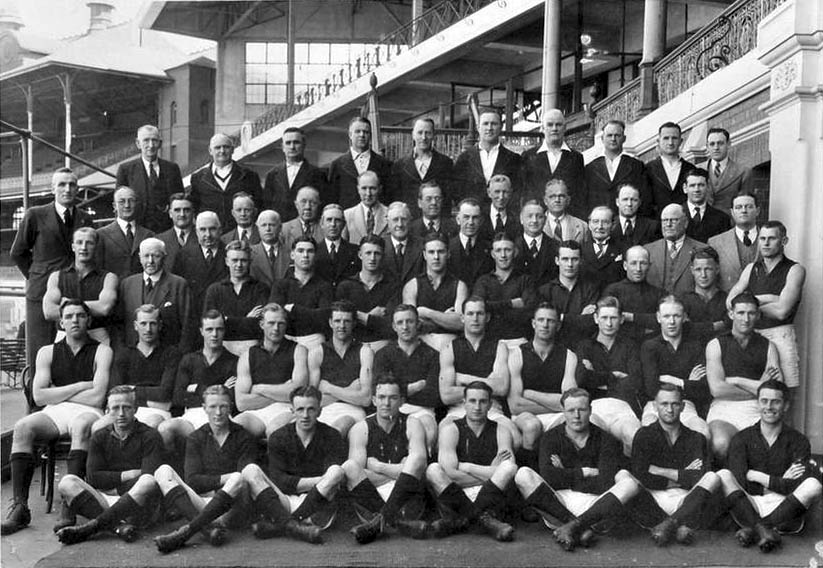
Melbourne FC, premier team

Melbourne:

- N Smith 7
- R Baggott 2
- P Beames 2
- J O'Keefe 2
- F Fanning 1
- K Truscott 1

Richmond:

- D Harris 5
- J Titus 3
- R Bawden 1
- J Crane 1

== See also ==
- 1940 VFL season
