= 1943 Hawthorn Football Club season =

19th season in the Victorian Football League

Hawthorn Football Club
1943 season
- President: Dr. Jacob Jona
- Coach: Roy Cazaly
- Captain: Bob Williams
- Home ground: Glenferrie Oval
- Lightning Premiership: Semifinals
- VFL Season: 9–6 (5th)
- Finals Series: Did not qualify
- Best and Fairest: Jim Bohan
- Leading goalkicker: Wally Culpitt (43)
- Highest home attendance: 16,000 (Round 9 vs. Footscray
- Lowest home attendance: 7,000 (Round 2 vs. Essendon
- Average home attendance: 10,714

The 1943 season was the Hawthorn Football Club's 19th season in the Victorian Football League and 42nd overall.

== Fixture ==
=== Lightning Premiership ===
The lightning premiership was played between rounds 11 and 12.

Rd	Date and local time	Opponent	Scores (Hawthorn's scores indicated in bold)			Venue	Attendance
Rd	Date and local time	Opponent	Home	Away	Result	Venue	Attendance
Semifinal	Saturday, 24 July	Fitzroy	5.4 (34)	**3.6 (24)**	Lost by 10 points	Princes Park (A)	

=== Premiership Season ===
Rd	Date and local time	Opponent	Scores (Hawthorn's scores indicated in bold)			Venue	Attendance	Record
Rd	Date and local time	Opponent	Home	Away	Result	Venue	Attendance	Record
1	Saturday, 8 May (2:45 pm)	St Kilda	14.9 (93)	**13.17 (95)**	Won by 2 points	Toorak Park (A)	6,000	1–0
2	Saturday, 15 May (2:45 pm)	Essendon	**7.8 (50)**	11.15 (81)	Lost by 31 points	Glenferrie Oval (H)	7,000	1–1
3	Saturday, 22 May (2:45 pm)	Melbourne	10.12 (72)	**17.15 (117)**	Won by 45 points	Punt Road Oval (A)	5,000	2–1
4	Saturday, 29 May (2:45 pm)	Fitzroy	**13.8 (86)**	9.21 (75)	Won by 11 points	Glenferrie Oval (H)	9,000	3–1
5	Saturday, 5 June (2:30 pm)	South Melbourne	10.15 (75)	**12.13 (85)**	Won by 10 points	Princes Park (A)	14,000	4–1
6	Bye							
7	Saturday, 19 June (2:30 pm)	North Melbourne	**20.16 (136)**	13.17 (95)	Won by 41 points	Glenferrie Oval (H)	8,000	5–1
8	Saturday, 26 June (2:30 pm)	Richmond	15.16 (106)	**8.14 (62)**	Lost by 44 points	Punt Road Oval (A)	16,000	5–2
9	Saturday, 3 July (2:30 pm)	Footscray	**13.11 (89)**	11.13 (79)	Won by 10 points	Glenferrie Oval (H)	16,000	6–2
10	Saturday, 10 July (2:30 pm)	Carlton	16.9 (105)	**11.14 (80)**	Lost by 25 points	Princes Park (A)	12,000	6–3
11	Saturday, 17 July (2:30 pm)	Collingwood	**16.14 (110)**	12.13 (85)	Won by 25 points	Glenferrie Oval (H)	8,000	7–3
12	Saturday, 31 July (2:30 pm)	Essendon	**7.13 (55)**	9.12 (66)	Lost by 11 points	Glenferrie Oval (H)	12,000	7–4
13	Saturday, 7 August (2:45 pm)	Carlton	13.19 (97)	**10.15 (75)**	Lost by 22 points	Princes Park (A)	15,000	7–5
14	Saturday, 14 August (2:45 pm)	Richmond	9.14 (68)	**11.7 (73)**	Won by 5 points	Punt Road Oval (A)	15,000	8–5
15	Saturday, 21 August (2:45 pm)	South Melbourne	**13.10 (88)**	7.14 (56)	Won by 32 points	Glenferrie Oval (H)	15,000	9–5
16	Saturday, 28 August (2:45 pm)	North Melbourne	8.11 (59)	**7.16 (58)**	Lost by 1 point	Arden Street Oval (A)	4,500	9–6

== Ladder ==
1943 VFL midseason ladder
Pos	Team	Pld	W	L	D	PF	PA	PP	Pts	
1	Essendon	10	8	2	0	951	782	121.6	36	Plays 2nd, 3rd, 4th, 5th, 6th
2	Richmond	10	7	3	0	968	808	119.8	32	Plays 1st, 3rd, 4th, 6th, 7th
3	Fitzroy	10	7	3	0	968	849	114.0	32	Plays 1st, 2nd, 5th, 7th, 9th
4	Hawthorn	10	7	3	0	910	866	105.1	32	Plays 1st, 2nd, 5th, 8th, 10th
5	Carlton	10	5	5	0	893	789	113.2	24	Plays 1st, 3rd, 4th, 8th, 9th
6	Footscray	10	5	5	0	837	774	108.1	24	Plays 1st, 2nd, 7th, 8th, 10th
7	Melbourne	10	5	5	0	898	1010	88.9	24	Plays 2nd, 3rd, 6th, 9th, 10th
8	North Melbourne	10	4	5	1	768	885	86.8	22	Plays 4th, 5th, 6th, 9th, 10th
9	Collingwood	10	3	7	0	748	864	86.6	16	Plays 3rd, 5th, 7th, 8th, 10th
10	South Melbourne	10	2	8	0	887	943	94.1	12	Plays 4th, 6th, 7th, 8th, 9th
11	St Kilda	10	1	8	1	731	989	73.9	10	Eliminated

Source: "How the clubs stand". The Football Record. Vol. 30, no. 14. Melbourne, VIC. 31 July 1943. p. 10.
Rules for classification: 1) points; 2) percentage; 3) number of points for.

(P)	Premiers
	Qualified for finals

#	Team	P	W	L	D	PF	PA	%	Pts
1	Richmond (P)	15	10	5	0	1435	1166	123.1	44
2	Essendon	15	10	5	0	1296	1125	115.2	44
3	Fitzroy	15	10	5	0	1345	1234	109.0	44
4	Carlton	15	9	6	0	1420	1136	125.0	40
5	Hawthorn	15	9	6	0	1259	1212	103.9	40
6	Footscray	15	7	8	0	1164	1244	93.6	32
7	Melbourne	15	7	8	0	1364	1537	88.7	32
8	South Melbourne	15	6	9	0	1346	1272	105.8	28
9	North Melbourne	15	5	9	1	1019	1323	77.0	26
10	Collingwood	15	5	10	0	1217	1358	89.6	24
11	St Kilda	10	1	8	1	731	989	73.9	10

Rules for classification: 1. premiership points; 2. percentage; 3. points for
Average score: 85.0
Source: AFL Tables
