= Sydney Anderson (disambiguation) =

Sydney Anderson (1881–1948) was a lawyer and politician from Minnesota

Sydney or Syd Anderson may also refer to:

- Sydney Anderson (Northern Ireland politician) (born 1949), Northern Ireland politician
- Syd Anderson (footballer, born 1884) (1884–1954), Australian footballer for Melbourne
- Syd Anderson (footballer, born 1918) (1918–1944), Australian footballer for Melbourne, RAAF flying officer
- Syd Anderson (footballer, born 1949), Australian footballer for South Melbourne
