= Dullard (disambiguation) =

A dullard is a stupid person; see idiot.

Dullard may also refer to:

== People ==
- Adrian Dullard (1918–1989), Australian rules footballer
- Anthony Dullard (born 1955), Australian rules footballer
- Jo Jo Dullard, young woman who disappeared in Ireland in 1995

== Other ==
- Dullard protein, a protein coding gene
