= Will Dean =

Will Dean may refer to:

- Will Dean (rower) (born 1987), Canadian rower
- Will Dean (footballer) (born 2000), English soccer player
- Will Dean (entrepreneur), English business founder
- Will Dean (author), British-born crime writer

== See also ==
- William Deans
