= Ray Hunt =

Ray Hunt may refer to:

- C. Raymond Hunt, American sailboat designer
- Ray Hunt (horse trainer) (1929–2009), American horse trainer and clinician
- Ray Lee Hunt (born 1943), American heir and businessman
- Ray Hunt (footballer) (born 1918), Australian rules footballer
- Ray C. Hunt (1920–1996), guerrilla leader in the Philippines during World War II
- Raymond Hunt (1921–1994), New Zealand cricketer
