= Graeme Anderson (footballer, born 1953) =

Australian rules footballer, born 1953

Personal information
- Born: 5 January 1953 (age 73)
- Original team: Port Melbourne (VFA)
- Debut: Round 9, 1975, Collingwood vs. Hawthorn, at Princes Park

Playing career^{1}
Years	Club	Games (Goals)
1970-1975, 1981-84	Port Melbourne	74 (283)
1975–1980	Collingwood	71 (91)
Total		145 (372)
- ^{1} Playing statistics correct to the end of 2005.

Graeme R. Anderson (born 5 January 1953) is a former Australian rules footballer who played for Collingwood in the Victorian Football League (VFL).

Recruited from Victorian Football Association (VFA) club Port Melbourne, Anderson was a tough forward who would occasionally play in the midfield as a ruck-rover or on the wing.

Anderson missed the 1978 season after playing in both 1977 Grand Finals against North Melbourne. He played in the 1979 Grand Final against Carlton.

At the end of the 1980 season, Anderson's tenure with The Magpies ended, and after 71 VFL games, he returned to the Port Melbourne Football Club the following year.

Anderson's father (Claude Anderson), brother (Syd Anderson), and uncle (Syd Anderson) all played in the VFL.

He attended Melbourne High School from 1967 to 1970 and played cricket for Melbourne Cricket Club and Port Melbourne Cricket Club.
