= William Dean =

William, Will, Bill or Billy Dean is the name of the following people:

== Arts and entertainment ==
- Bill Dean (1921–2000), British actor
- Billy Dean (born 1962), American country music singer

== Sports ==
- William Dean (Hampshire cricketer) (c. 1882–?), Australian cricketer
- William Henry Dean (1887–1949), English water polo player
- Dixie Dean (1907–1980), English footballer
- William Dean (Somerset cricketer) (1926–1994), English cricketer
- Bill Dean (baseball) (fl. 1940), American baseball player
- Will Dean (rower) (born 1987), Canadian rower
- Will Dean (footballer) (born 2000), English footballer

== Other fields ==
- William Dean (priest) (died 1588), English priest and martyr
- William Dean (engineer) (1840–1905), British railway engineer
- William Reginald Dean (1896–1973), British applied mathematician
- William F. Dean (1899–1981), United States Army general
- William D. Dean (born 1940), American politician and television producer
- Will Dean (entrepreneur) (born 1980), English business founder
- Bill Dean (politician), American legislator from Ohio

== See also ==
- William the Dean, 13th century Scottish bishop
- William Deane (born 1931), Governor-General of Australia from 1996 to 2001
- Billy Deans (disambiguation)
