= Billy Deans (disambiguation) =

Billy Deans may refer to:

- Billy Deans (1922–2006), Australian rules footballer
- Billy Deans (diver), American wreck and technical diver

== See also ==
- William Dean (disambiguation)
