= Francis Reilly =

Francis Reilly could refer to:

- Francis Reilly (barrister) (Francis Reilly, 1825-1883), English barrister
- Frank Reilly (footballer) (Francis Reilly, 1894-1956), Scottish footballer
- Joe Reilly (Australian footballer) (Francis Joseph Reilly, 1916-2003)

== See also ==
- Francis O'Reilly (1922-2013), Irish businessman
