= Gerry Daly (Australian footballer) =

Australian rules footballer (1915–1977)

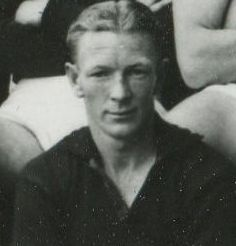

Personal information
- Full name: Gordon Eric Daly
- Born: 19 January 1915; Numurkah, Victoria
- Died: 6 August 1977 (aged 62); Mildura, Victoria
- Original team: Sandhurst
- Height: 175 cm (5 ft 9 in)
- Weight: 71 kg (157 lb)

Playing career^{1}
| Years | Club | Games (Goals) |
| 1939–1941, 1946 | Melbourne | 19 (2) |
- ^{1} Playing statistics correct to the end of 1946.

Career highlights
- VFL Premiership 1941; * VFL Seconds Premiership 1939

Gordon Eric "Gerry" Daly (19 January 1915 – 6 August 1977) was an Australian rules footballer who played with Melbourne in the Victorian Football League (VFL).

== Family ==
The son of Jeremiah John Daly (1871–1946), and Ruby Minnie Daly (1889–1967), née Cleary, Gordon Eric Daly was born at Numurkah, Victoria on 19 January 1915.

He married Mary Kathleen "Mollie" Cummins (1917-) in 1939. They had two children.

== Football ==
Daly was recruited from the Sandhurst Football Club in the Bendigo Football League (BFL). He experienced considerable team success during his short VFL career, not playing in a loss until his 14th appearance. Daly was also a member of Melbourne's 1941 premiership team, as a forward pocket. He kicked one of only two career goals in the 29-point grand final win.

From 1942 to 1945, he did not feature in the VFL due to the war, during which time he served with the Australian Army. He returned to Melbourne in the 1946 season, but would play just three games.

== Military service ==
He enlisted in the Australian Army in December 1941, served overseas in the Bougainville campaign, and was discharged in December 1945.

== Death ==
He died at Mildura, Victoria on 6 August 1977.
