= John Cotter =

John Cotter may refer to:

- Mick Cotter, John Francis "Mick" Cotter, (born 1935), Australian politician
- John L. Cotter (1911–1999), American archaeologist
- John P. Cotter (1911–1993), Justice of the Connecticut Supreme Court
- John Cotter of Coppingerstown (fl. 1585), member of Irish Cotter family
- John Cotter, fictional character in TV series Fashion House
- John Cotter, Australian racing driver and co-owner of M3 Motorsport

== See also ==
- Jack Cotter
- John T Cotter
- John Cother (by 1490–1532 or later), English politician
- Cotter (surname)
