= Syd Anderson (footballer, born 1918) =

Australian rules footballer (1918–1944)

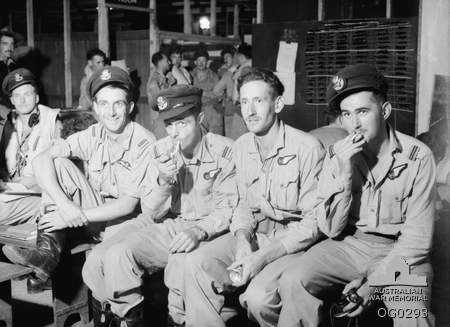
- Anderson (centre) with other members of his RAAF squadron

Personal information
- Full name: Sydney Louis Anderson
- Born: 13 January 1918; Moonee Ponds, Victoria
- Died: 20 May 1944 (aged 26); Wewak, Territory of New Guinea
- Original team: South Port
- Height: 183 cm (6 ft 0 in)
- Weight: 73 kg (161 lb)
- Position: Wing

Playing career^{1}
Years	Club	Games (Goals)
1939–1941	Melbourne	52 (12)
- ^{1} Playing statistics correct to the end of 1941.

Career highlights
- 3x VFL premiership player: 1939, 1940, 1941; Melbourne's Most Improved Player, 1940; Melbourne's Most Consistent Player, 1941

Sydney Louis Anderson (13 January 1918 – 20 May 1944) was an Australian rules footballer who played with Melbourne in the Victorian Football League (VFL).

== Family ==
The son of Sydney Sims Anderson (1888–1964), who became Town Clerk of the City of Port Melbourne, and Adela Myrtle Anderson (1884–1983), née Day, Sydney Louis Anderson was born on 13 January 1918.

He married Lorna Jean Waddell on 22 February 1941.

== Football ==
A tall wingman, Anderson was a premiership player in every one of his three VFL seasons.

His father played 98 games for Port Melbourne in the VFA; his brother, Claude Anderson, played 2 games for South Melbourne; and his nephews (Claude's sons), Syd Anderson played 4 games for South Melbourne and 56 games for Port Melbourne, and Graeme Anderson played 71 games for Collingwood and 144 games for Port Melbourne.

== Military service ==
Anderson enlisted in the Royal Australian Air Force in December 1941. Commencing as a Pilot Officer, he was promoted to Flying Officer in September 1943.

Whilst serving on air operations near Wewak in the Territory of New Guinea in 1944, Anderson's Bristol Beaufort was shot down by Japanese flak, and all aboard save one were killed, including Anderson.

== Legacy ==
In 1949, his parents donated a trophy in his memory to the Melbourne Football Club, and the club decided to award the Syd Anderson Trophy annually to the player who came second in the club's best and fairest – the trophy to the winner was named after "Bluey" Truscott, and the trophy to the season's third best and fairest player was named after Ron Barassi Sr.

== See also ==
- List of Victorian Football League players who died on active service
