= Ted Regan =

Australian rules footballer

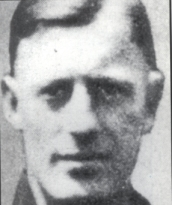

Personal information
- Full name: George Frederick Regan
- Born: 6 June 1915; Elsternwick, Victoria
- Died: 9 July 1943 (aged 28); Ramree, British Burma
- Original teams: Brighton Technical School; Old Boys (VAFA)
- Height: 178 cm (5 ft 10 in)
- Weight: 75 kg (165 lb)
- Position: Defender

Playing career^{1}
| Years | Club | Games (Goals) |
| 1938 | Melbourne | 4 (0) |
| 1939, 1941 | Essendon | 7 (1) |
| Total | | 11 (1) |
- ^{1} Playing statistics correct to the end of 1941.

George Frederick "Ted" Regan (6 June 1915 – 9 July 1943) was an Australian rules footballer who played for Melbourne and Essendon in the Victorian Football League (VFL).

He was killed in action during an air raid in British Burma while serving with the RAAF.

== Family ==
The son of George Augustus Regan (1881–1952), and Ethel Eva Regan (1883–1969), née Schofield, George Frederick Regan was born in Elsternwick, Victoria on 6 June 1915.

== Education ==
Regan was educated at Brighton Technical School (1927–1929), at Melbourne High School (1930–1932) – where he was a classmate of "Bluey" Truscott – and at George Taylor and Staff's Coaching College, Collins Street, Melbourne (1933).

Having gained his Leaving Certificate in the December 1933 examinations, he went on to study accountancy in the evenings with E. Pyke and Hosking, Chartered Accountants, in Elizabeth Street, Melbourne.

== Football ==
Regan usually played as a defender.

=== Brighton T.S.O.B. (VAFA) ===
Granted a permit in May 1934, he played for three seasons (1934–1936) with Brighton Technical School Old Boys Football Club in "A Section" of the Victorian Amateur Football Association (VAFA).

=== Melbourne (VFL) ===
Having played with the Melbourne Second XVIII in 1937, and having received a permit to play with the First XVIII, he played his first senior match for Melbourne, at full-back, in the opening round of the 1938 season, against Geelong, on 23 April 1938.

=== Essendon (VFL) ===
Essendon are Proud of War Prowess of their Players

Percy Taylor
Essendon, with a proud record on the football field, are just as proud of
their war record, but that pride is tinged with sadness, several well-known
players having been killed and several others missing or prisoner of war.
Those reported killed are Pit-Off Ted Regan, Sgt Geoff Goldin, and Pte
Len Johnson, while Plt-Off Ray Watts has been reported missing and Lieut
[Keith] Forsyth a prisoner of war.
…
Plt-Off Regan, who came to the club from Melbourne, was rapidly making
his place in the team secure when he joined the Air Force. That same ability
led to his promotion to commissioned rank in the Air Force, and led to his
promotion to commissioned rank in the Air Force, and there was great regret
in the club when he was reported killed in action over Burma.
Regan was one of a number of Australians sent to Rhodesia to train. In
letters to club officials he told of his experiences. He said that they had
formed quite a tie with Rhodesia, having lived there for a year. After a week
After a week in Durban they shifted to Kenya, where they spent two months.
"The flying we did around Nanyuki was always packed with interest," he
writes. "Some of our trips took us right up to Lake Rudolf, nearly into
Abyssinia – very grim country.
"One lake, Naivasha, is very lovely. I spent a couple of week-ends there,
and enjoyed the swimming and boating. There are plenty of hippopotami
in the lake, but they seem to have an agreement with swimmers that neither
interferes with the other – altogether an admirable arrangement. . . I enjoyed
low flying most of all in this country. It gave one a wonderful opportunity to
get a close look at the game – like flying over the zoo."
The Australasian, 20 May 1944.

He transferred to Essendon in 1939, and played his first First XVIII game, against Geelong, on 5 August 1939.

Having badly injured his leg in his second match, against St Kilda on the following Saturday, he did not play in the last two games of the 1939 season. and for the entire 1940 season.

In his seventh, and last match for the Essendon First XVIII he played in the 1941 VFL Grand Final – rather than, that is, playing in the Second XVIII team (in which he had played for the previous eight weeks), that won the Grand Final against Fitzroy 12.16 (88) to 9.17 (71), in an extremely rough match that descended into an all-in brawl at the final bell.

Selected as 19th man, he replaced Les Griggs at three-quarter time, and kicked one goal – an inaccurate Essendon, with one more scoring shot, lost to Melbourne 13.20 (98) to 19.13 (127).

== Military service ==
A qualified accountant by profession, and having been employed by British Dominion Films, Ltd. for nine years, he enlisted with the RAAF on 15 August 1941, eventually gaining the rank of Flight Sergeant.

He undertook his basic training, under the auspices of the Empire Air Training Scheme (EATS), at the No.1 Initial Flying Training School RAAF at Somers, Victoria, and officially gained his "wings" as a pilot following extensive training in Rhodesia.

Following his training in Rhodesia, he went to India as a Blenheim bomber pilot.

== Death ==
Regan was killed when his plane was shot down over British Burma on 9 July 1943. Piloting a Bristol Blenheim crewed by himself and Sergeants Gordon Rowan and Merville Smith, Regan was involved in a six-aircraft aerial raid on Ramree. During the raid, Regan's Blenheim took heavy flak, and started to emit black smoke. The Blenheim proceeded to catch fire, break off from the formation of planes, and crash into a hillside, exploding the plane and killing Regan, Rowan, and Smith in the process.

He has no known grave, and is commemorated at the Singapore Memorial at the Kranji War Memorial in Singapore.

== See also ==
- List of Victorian Football League players who died on active service
