= Brian Randall =

Australian rules footballer (1920–1991)

Personal information
- Full name: Brian Thomas Randall
- Born: 12 October 1920; Richmond, Victoria
- Died: 4 December 1991 (aged 71)
- Original team: Richmond Districts
- Height: 188 cm (6 ft 2 in)
- Weight: 86 kg (190 lb)

Playing career^{1}
Years	Club	Games (Goals)
1941–1945	Richmond	54 (36)
- ^{1} Playing statistics correct to the end of 1945.

Career highlights
- Richmond Premiership Player 1943; Richmond Reserves Best & Fairest 1940; Richmond Reserves Premiership Player 1946

Brian Thomas Randall (12 October 1920 – 4 December 1991) was an Australian rules footballer who played in the VFL from 1941 to 1945 for the Richmond Football Club.

Randall played centre half forward in Richmond's 1943 VFL Grand Final victory. Randall also played in Richmond's 1942 and 1944 losing VFL grand finals too.

Randall coached Echuca Football Club from 1947 to 1950, including their 1948 Echuca Football League premiership.
