= Tom Bawden =

Australian rules footballer, born 1912

Personal information
- Full name: Thomas Anthony Bawden
- Born: 19 October 1912; Leongatha, Victoria
- Died: 9 September 1994 (aged 81)
- Original team: Morwell / Leongatha

Playing career^{1}
Years	Club	Games (Goals)
1934	Essendon	5 (3)
- ^{1} Playing statistics correct to the end of 1934.

Thomas Anthony Bawden (19 October 1912 – 9 September 1994) was an Australian rules footballer who played with Essendon in the Victorian Football League (VFL).

He was the older brother of Richmond player, Bob Bawden.
