= George Gibbs (Australian footballer) =

Australian rules footballer, born 1905

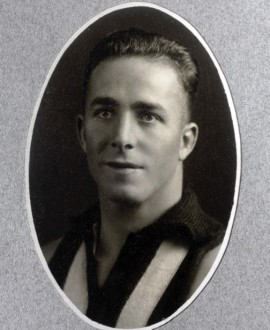
- Gibbs during his Collingwood career

Personal information
- Full name: George Gibbs
- Born: 3 October 1905; Carlton, Victoria
- Died: 27 February 1987 (aged 81); Upper Ferntree Gully, Victoria
- Original team: Fitzroy
- Height: 179 cm (5 ft 10 in)
- Weight: 79 kg (174 lb)

Playing career^{1}
Years	Club	Games (Goals)
1927–28	Fitzroy	11 (2)
1929–30	Collingwood	27 (16)
Total		38 (18)
- ^{1} Playing statistics correct to the end of 1930.

George Gibbs (3 October 1905 – 27 February 1987) was an Australian rules footballer who played with Fitzroy and Collingwood in the Victorian Football League (VFL).

== Family ==
The son of George Gibbs (1879–1943), and Ada Alice Gibbs (1879–1962), née Musgrove, George Gibbs was born at Carlton, Victoria on 3 October 1905. His brother, Leslie Gibbs (1918–1976), played with Melbourne and Preston.
