= Frank Kennedy =

Australian rules footballer

Personal information
- Full name: Francis Michael Kennedy
- Born: 31 July 1920; Vervale, via Garfield, Victoria
- Died: 27 December 1990 (aged 70); Garfield, Victoria
- Original team: Garfield
- Height: 183 cm (6 ft 0 in)
- Weight: 82 kg (181 lb)

Playing career^{1}
Years	Club	Games (Goals)
1944–47	Melbourne	36 (11)
- ^{1} Playing statistics correct to the end of 1947.

Francis Michael Kennedy (31 July 1920 – 27 December 1990) was an Australian rules footballer who played with Melbourne in the Victorian Football League (VFL).

== Family ==
The son of Michael Francis Kennedy (1890-1971), and Ann Maree Kennedy (1892-1977), née Maher, Francis Michael Kennedy was born at Vervale, Victoria on 31 July 1920.

He married Agnes May Stout (1920-1989) in 1946.

== Football ==
Kennedy's first contact with the Melbourne Football Club was on 2 April 1940, 1940, when -- described as a "new man" from "Vervale, Gippsland" -- he took part in the team's training.

In 1944, he was listed as a "new" player -- from the Melbourne Seconds -- in Melbourne's final training list for the 1944 season, and made his debut for Melbourne's First XVIII against Richmond, at Punt Road, on 6 May 1944, and was considered to be Melbourne's best player (in a losing team).

"Frank Kennedy, from Garfield, was not so conspicuous against Essendon [in round 3, on 4 May 1946], but was one of Melbourne's best the previous week [viz., round 2, on 27 April 1946, his first senior match in the 1946 season] at Carlton.
Playing on a half-forward flank, his leading-out, and general approach to the ball, were features. His present form should keep him in the side." -- "Clubman", 8 May 1946.

Kennedy was a reserve in Melbourne's losing 1946 VFL Grand Final team. He came onto the field in the final quarter, and was reported for striking and suspended for four matches.

== Military service ==
He served in the Australian Army in World War II from July 1943 to February 1945.

== Death ==
He died at Garfield, Victoria on 27 December 1990.
