= Sid Silk =

Australian rules footballer

Personal information
- Full name: Sidney Edward Silk
- Born: 17 April 1921; Chelsea, Victoria
- Died: 29 June 2004 (aged 83)
- Original team: Essendon United
- Height: 182 cm (6 ft 0 in)
- Weight: 79 kg (174 lb)

Playing career^{1}
Years	Club	Games (Goals)
1941–44	Essendon	15 (0)
- ^{1} Playing statistics correct to the end of 1944.

Sidney Edward Silk (17 April 1921 – 29 June 2004) was an Australian rules footballer who played for Essendon in the Victorian Football League (VFL) during the early 1940s.

Silk was recruited locally and made his debut in the 1941 Preliminary Final victory over Carlton at the Melbourne Cricket Ground but could not hold his place for the Grand Final. Silk did however play in Essendon's 1942 premiership team, as the 19th man. Once his league career was over, Silk spent three seasons at Brunswick in the Victorian Football Association (VFA), where he later umpired.
