= Herbie Tonkes =

Australian rules footballer

Personal information
- Full name: Herbert F. Tonkes
- Born: 4 April 1921
- Died: 10 September 1991 (aged 70)
- Original team: Preston Jnrs / Essendon United
- Height: 179 cm (5 ft 10 in)
- Weight: 80 kg (176 lb)

Playing career^{1}
Years	Club	Games (Goals)
1944, 1946–47	Essendon	37 (0)
- ^{1} Playing statistics correct to the end of 1947.

Herbie 'Tinker' Tonkes (4 April 1921 – 10 September 1991) was an Australian rules footballer who played for Essendon in the Victorian Football League (VFL) during the 1940s.

Tonkes could play a variety of positions, from defence, the wing to half back. He played his early football at Preston Juniors and was recruited to the VFL from Essendon United. War duties limited him to seven appearances in 1944 and he missed the entire 1945 season as he was serving in the Pacific. The following year he returned to the league and was a half back flanker in the victorious 1946 VFL Grand Final team. After one final season, Tonkes joined VFA club Brunswick.
