= Warren Lewis (Australian footballer) =

Australian rules footballer

Personal information
- Full name: Warren Charles Lewis
- Born: 10 April 1923; Penshurst, Victoria
- Died: 8 April 1988 (aged 64); Hamilton, Victoria
- Original team: Penshurst Football Club
- Height: 183 cm (6 ft 0 in)
- Weight: 81 kg (179 lb)

Playing career^{1}
Years	Club	Games (Goals)
1941, 1944	Melbourne	8 (3)
- ^{1} Playing statistics correct to the end of 1944.

Warren Charles Lewis (10 April 1923 – 8 April 1988) was an Australian rules footballer who played with Melbourne in the Victorian Football League (VFL).

Lewis, who was from Penshurst, was a member of Melbourne's 1941 premiership team, as the 19th man. The 1941 VFL Grand Final was just his fourth league appearance. Military service kept him from playing again until 1944, when he appeared in four more senior games.
