= Bill Perkins (Australian rules footballer) =

Australian rules footballer

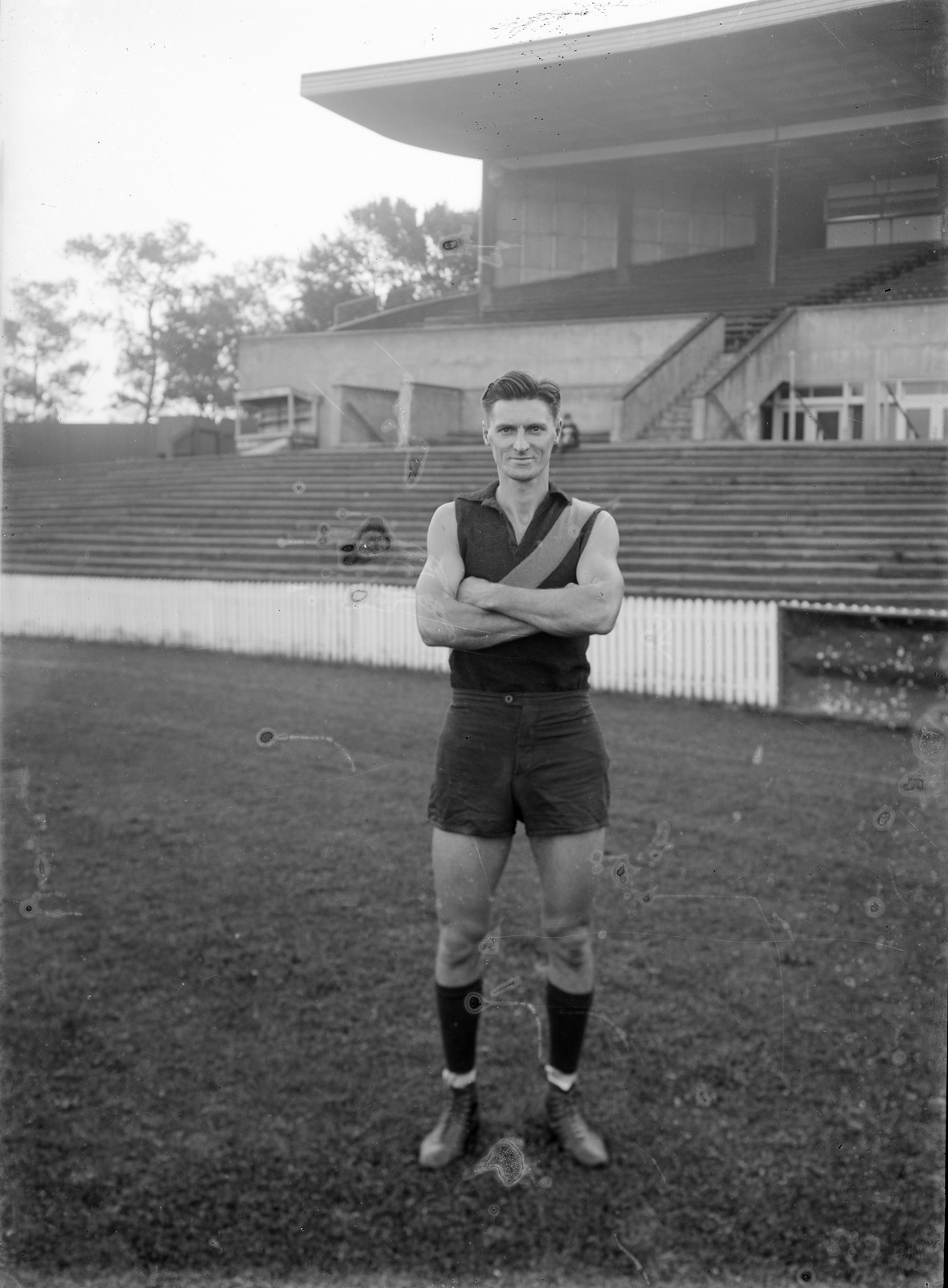

Personal information
- Full name: William Albert Henry Perkins
- Born: 10 February 1920; Leicester, England
- Died: 30 May 2009 (aged 89)
- Original team: Noble Park (DDA)
- Height: 185 cm (6 ft 1 in)
- Weight: 82 kg (181 lb)

Playing career^{1}
| Years | Club | Games (Goals) |
| 1940–1949 | Richmond | 148 (0) |
- ^{1} Playing statistics correct to the end of 1949.

Career highlights
- Richmond Premiership Player 1943; Interstate Games:- 1; Richmond Life Membership 1949

William Albert Henry Perkins, or 'Polly' as he was affectionately known, was an Australian rules footballer who was a member of Richmond Football Club's 1943 premiership side.

Born in England, Perkins was recruited from Dandenong District Association club Noble Park and made his senior Victorian Football League (VFL) debut in 1940. Playing as a defender, Perkins also represented Victoria in interstate football and retired after the 1949 VFL season. He later coached Brighton Football Club in the Victorian Football Association (VFA).

Perkins died on 29 May 2009, aged 89. Prior to his death, his was the last surviving player of the 1943 Premiership side.
