= Cec Ruddell =

Australian rules footballer, born 1917

Personal information
- Full name: Cecil Alfred Ruddell
- Born: 23 May 1917; Fitzroy North, Victoria
- Died: 10 December 1990 (aged 73); Fitzroy North, Victoria
- Original team: Northcote (VFA)
- Height: 182 cm (6 ft 0 in)
- Weight: 81 kg (179 lb)

Playing career^{1}
Years	Club	Games (Goals)
1940–1949	Essendon	122 (0)

Coaching career
Years	Club	Games (W–L–D)
1945, 1946	Essendon	2 (0–2–0)
- ^{1} Playing statistics correct to the end of 1949.

Career highlights
- Essendon premiership player: 1942 & 1946

Cecil Alfred Ruddell (23 May 1917 – 10 December 1990) was an Australian rules footballer who played with Essendon in the Victorian Football League (VFL) during the 1940s.

Ruddell was a key player in Essendon's defence in what was a strong decade for the club, just once in his nine seasons did they miss out on the finals. Usually a fullback, it was in that position that he played in the Bombers' 1942 and 1946 VFL premiership sides.

Ruddell also played in Essendon's losing VFL grand finals in 1941, 1943, 1947 and the two 1948 grand finals!

He filled in as coach of Essendon for a game in 1945 and another the following season. An ankle injury ended his VFL career.

He was later captain-coach of Camberwell in the Victorian Football Association in 1950, playing eight games.

Ruddell played 49 first eleven games for Fitzroy Cricket Club between 1937/38 and 1941/42.

Ruddell also served in the Royal Australian Air Force during World War II.
