= Bob Bawden =

Australian rules footballer, born 1917

Personal information
- Full name: Robert Harvey Bawden
- Born: 28 February 1917; Leongatha, Victoria
- Died: 22 July 1980 (aged 63); Brisbane, Queensland
- Original teams: Leongatha Imperials, Morwell
- Height: 191 cm (6 ft 3 in)
- Weight: 93 kg (205 lb)

Playing career^{1}
| Years | Club | Games (Goals) |
| 1939–1945 | Richmond | 107 (107) |
- ^{1} Playing statistics correct to the end of 1945.

Robert Harvey Bawden (28 February 1917 – 22 July 1980) was an Australian rules footballer who played with Richmond in the Victorian Football League (VFL) during the early 1940s.

Bawden originally played with Leongatha Imperials Football Club and was a member of their 1932 and Leongatha FC's 1934 and 1935 premiership teams.

In 1935, Bawden played 16 games with Victorian Football Association (VFA) club Oakleigh. He returned to Morwell and played in their premiership and won the 1937 Rodda Memorial Gold Medal in the Central Gippsland Football Association before joining Richmond in 1939.

Over the course of his career there Bawden acted as second ruckman to Richmond great Jack Dyer. When not rucking he was used in the forward pocket and was a member of Richmond's 1943 VFL premiership team. He also participated in three losing VFL Grand Finals, in 1940, 1942 and 1944.

From 1946 onwards for a few years he played for City and then Cornwall in the Northern Tasmanian Football Association (NTFA).

He was the brother of Essendon player, Tom Bawden.
