= Ian Hull =

Australian rules footballer

Personal information
- Full name: Ian Goodman Hull
- Born: 20 June 1916; Benalla, Victoria
- Died: 1 July 1985 (aged 69); Caulfield South, Victoria
- Original team: Brighton Technical School
- Height: 183 cm (6 ft 0 in)
- Weight: 88 kg (194 lb)

Playing career^{1}
Years	Club	Games (Goals)
1936–1945	Richmond	107 (42)
1947	Port Adelaide	10 (?)
Total		117 (42/?)
- ^{1} Playing statistics correct to the end of 1945.

Ian Goodman Hull (20 June 1916 – 1 July 1985) was an Australian rules footballer who played with Richmond in the Victorian Football League (VFL).

== Football ==
Hull started his career as a wingman, but played a lot of his football for Richmond at centre half-back, which was from where he played in the 1940 VFL Grand Final loss.

He did not play any senior VFL football in 1943 and 1944, due to war service.

In 1947 Ian played 10 games, deep in defence, for the Port Adelaide Football Club in the SANFL.
