= Laird Smith =

Australian rules footballer, born 1913

Personal information
- Full name: Laird Morton Smith
- Born: 16 July 1913; South Melbourne, Victoria, Australia
- Died: 27 February 1999 (aged 85)
- Original team: Melbourne High School
- Height: 170 cm (5 ft 7 in)
- Weight: 71 kg (157 lb)

Playing career^{1}
Years	Club	Games (Goals)
1934–1938	St Kilda	57 (77)
1939–1945	Richmond	66 (73)
Total		123 (150)
- ^{1} Playing statistics correct to the end of 1945.

Laird Morton Smith (16 July 1913 – 27 February 1999) was an Australian rules footballer who played with St Kilda and Richmond in the Victorian Football League (VFL).

Smith, a Melbourne High School product, started his career at South Melbourne but only played for them at reserves level. A rover, he was second in the St Kilda goal-kicking in 1936 and 1937, with 31 and 30 goals respectively. He appeared in the 1940 VFL Grand Final for Richmond, on a half forward flank, but finished on the losing team. From 1942 to 1944 he didn't play a senior game, owing to his wartime service. He was appointed secretary of the Geelong Football Club in 1947 and also later served St Kilda as an administrator.
