= Jack Quinn (footballer, born 1918) =

Australian rules footballer

Personal information
- Full name: Jack Alban Quinn
- Born: 11 June 1918; Echuca, Victoria
- Died: 11 June 2006 (aged 88)
- Original team: St Kilda Under 18s
- Height: 169 cm (5 ft 7 in)
- Weight: 76 kg (168 lb)

Playing career^{1}
Years	Club	Games (Goals)
1938–1940	South Melbourne	10 (8)
1940–1941	Richmond	19 (14)
1946	Melbourne	6 (5)
Total		35 (27)
- ^{1} Playing statistics correct to the end of 1946.

Jack Alban Quinn (11 June 1918 – 11 June 2006) was an Australian rules footballer who played with South Melbourne, Richmond and Melbourne in the Victorian Football League (VFL).

Quinn started out in the Melbourne Boys League, playing for St Kilda Under 18s, before joining the first of his three league clubs, South Melbourne.

After appearing for South Melbourne in Round 1, 1940, Quinn transferred to Richmond, playing as rover for them in the 1940 VFL Grand Final, which they lost. After four years out of the game, spent in the army, he returned for one final season in 1946, at Melbourne.
