= Shane McGrath (footballer, born 1919) =

Australian rules footballer, born 1919

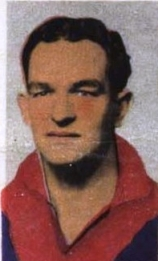

Personal information
- Full name: James Patrick McGrath
- Born: 6 June 1919; Lake Marmal, Victoria
- Died: 1 November 1974 (aged 55); North Melbourne, Victoria
- Original team: Trafalgar
- Height: 183 cm (6 ft 0 in)
- Weight: 89 kg (196 lb)

Playing career^{1}
Years	Club	Games (Goals)
1940–1950	Melbourne	118 (3)
- ^{1} Playing statistics correct to the end of 1950.

Career highlights
- 2× VFL premierships: 1941, 1948; Melbourne captain: 1950; 3× Sporting Life team of the year: 1947, 1948, 1949; Melbourne Hall of Fame

James Patrick "Shane" McGrath (6 June 1919 – 1 November 1974) was an Australian rules footballer who played for Melbourne in the Victorian Football League during the 1940s.

A fullback, McGrath was a member of Melbourne's 1941 premiership side before missing the following two seasons due to war service. He was a premiership player again in 1948 and captained the club during his last season, in 1950. McGrath represented Victoria at interstate football regularly.
