= Joe Reilly (Australian footballer) =

Australian rules footballer, born 1916

Personal information
- Full name: Francis Joseph Reilly
- Born: 17 September 1916; Lismore, Victoria
- Died: 15 November 2003 (aged 87); Geelong, Victoria
- Height: 180 cm (5 ft 11 in)
- Weight: 86 kg (190 lb)

Playing career^{1}
Years	Club	Games (Goals)
1940–1942	Richmond	17 (0)
- ^{1} Playing statistics correct to the end of 1942.

Francis Joseph Reilly (17 September 1916 – 15 November 2003) was an Australian rules footballer who played with Richmond in the Victorian Football League (VFL).

Reilly was a rugged back pocket in Richmond's loss to Essendon in the 1942 VFL Grand Final.

He worked in the police force and in 1946 transferred to Ballarat, where he joined the East Ballarat Football Club, as coach.

Joe Reilly married Rosie May Martin in Melbourne in 1945, shortly before their move to Ballarat.
