= Bill Pearson (footballer, born 1922) =

Australian rules footballer

Personal information
- Full name: William James Pearson
- Born: 11 June 1922; Carlton, Victoria
- Died: 6 December 2010 (aged 88)
- Original team: La Mascotte (EDFL)
- Height: 177 cm (5 ft 10 in)
- Weight: 82 kg (181 lb)
- Position: Centreman

Playing career^{1}
Years	Club	Games (Goals)
1945–47	Essendon	51 (24)
- ^{1} Playing statistics correct to the end of 1947.

William James Pearson (11 June 1922 – 6 December 2010) was an Australian rules footballer who played for Essendon in the Victorian Football League (VFL) during the 1940s.

Pearson served in the Australian Army during World War II, seeing active duty as an AIF gun layer in the New Guinea jungle.

Pearson was recruited from La Mascotte and in just his third league game kicked four goals to help his club defeat Carlton by 100 points. He was the centreman in the Essendon premiership side of 1946 and finished tenth in that season's Brownlow Medal count with 13 votes, the most by an Essendon player.

A knee injury in 1947 ended Pearson's career when a series of operations, five in total, weren't enough to allow him to play again.
