= Arthur Barr-Kemp =

Australian rules footballer

Personal information
- Full name: Arthur Lionel Barr-Kemp
- Born: 6 September 1921
- Died: 25 September 2003 (aged 82)
- Original team: Brunswick
- Height: 187 cm (6 ft 2 in)
- Weight: 89 kg (196 lb)

Playing career^{1}
Years	Club	Games (Goals)
1943–1946	Richmond	34 (4)
- ^{1} Playing statistics correct to the end of 1946.

Career highlights
- Richmond premiership player - 1943

Arthur Lionel Barr-Kemp (6 September 1921 – 25 September 2003) was an Australian rules footballer who played in the VFL from 1943 to 1946 for the Richmond Football Club.

Barr-Kemp's surname was originally 'Kemp', until it was changed to Barr-Kemp later on.
