= Laurie Dearle =

Australian rules footballer, born 1919

Personal information
- Full name: Laurence Dearle
- Born: 16 October 1919; Fremantle, Western Australia
- Died: 25 October 1979 (aged 60); Broome, Western Australia
- Original team: East Fremantle
- Height: 175 cm (5 ft 9 in)
- Weight: 76 kg (168 lb)
- Position: Centreman

Playing career^{1}
Years	Club	Games (Goals)
1940	East Fremantle	16 (19)
1942–47	Essendon	76 (42)
- ^{1} Playing statistics correct to the end of 1947.

Laurence Dearle (16 October 1919 – 25 October 1979) was an Australian rules footballer who played for Essendon in the Victorian Football League (VFL) during the 1940s.

Dearle started his career with East Fremantle and in 1942 arrived at Essendon under a war time service permit.

A premiership player in his debut season with Essendon, Dearle kicked two goals as a centreman in the 1942 Grand Final win over Richmond. He appeared in another Grand Final the following season and finished on the losing team. In 1944 he kicked 23 goals for the year, over half of his final tally of career goals.
