= Ernie O'Rourke =

Australian rules footballer (1926–2024)

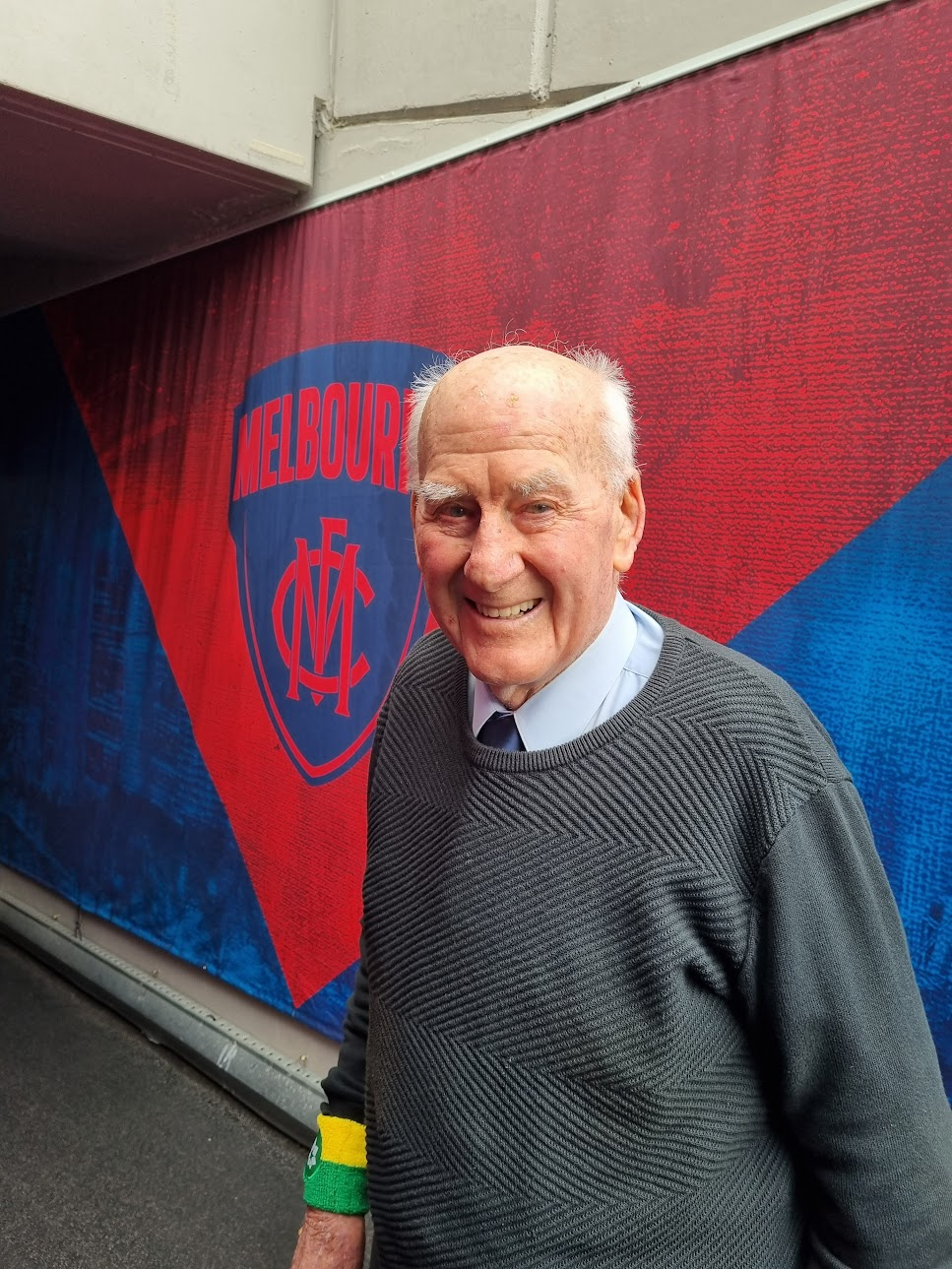

Personal information
- Full name: Ernest Thomas O'Rourke
- Born: 8 April 1926
- Died: 5 February 2024 (aged 97); Cohuna, Victoria, Australia
- Original team: Bentleigh
- Height: 173 cm (5 ft 8 in)
- Weight: 71 kg (157 lb)

Playing career^{1}
Years	Club	Games (Goals)
1945–48	Melbourne	39 (46)
1949	North Melbourne	9 (6)
Total		48 (52)
- ^{1} Playing statistics correct to the end of 1949.

Ernest Thomas O'Rourke (8 April 1926 – 5 February 2024) was an Australian rules footballer who played with Melbourne and North Melbourne in the Victorian Football League (VFL). O'Rourke died in Cohuna, Victoria on 5 February 2024, at the age of 97.
