= Jim Mitchell (Australian footballer) =

Australian rules footballer

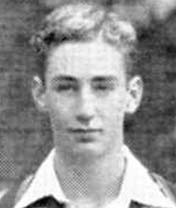

Personal information
- Full name: James Anderson Mitchell
- Born: 26 November 1920; Malvern East, Victoria
- Died: 14 October 1996 (aged 75); Bowral, New South Wales
- Original team: University Blacks
- Height: 191 cm (6 ft 3 in)
- Weight: 84 kg (185 lb)

Playing career^{1}
Years	Club	Games (Goals)
1946–48	Melbourne	42 (33)
- ^{1} Playing statistics correct to the end of 1948.

James Anderson Mitchell (26 November 1920 – 14 October 1996) was an Australian rules footballer who played with Melbourne in the Victorian Football League (VFL).

Prior to playing for Melbourne, Mitchell served in the Australian Army for five years during World War II.
