= 1943 VFL season =

47th season of the Victorian Football League (VFL)

1943 VFL premiership season
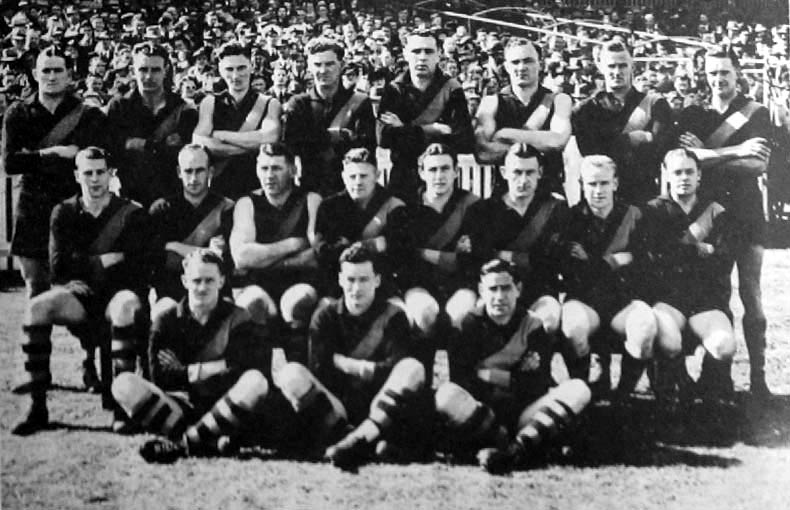
- Richmond Football Club, premier team
- Teams: 11
- Premiers: Richmond; 5th premiership
- Minor premiers: Richmond; 4th minor premiership
- Brownlow Medallist: Not awarded
- Fred Fanning (Melbourne)
- Matches played: 84
- Highest: 42,100

The 1943 VFL season was the 47th season of the Victorian Football League (VFL), the highest level senior Australian rules football competition in Victoria.

As in 1942, only eleven of the league's twelve clubs competed, with Geelong remaining in recess due to travel restrictions during World War II. The season ran from 8 May until 25 September, and comprised a 15-game home-and-away season followed by a finals series featuring the top four clubs.

The premiership was won by the Richmond Football Club for the fifth time, after it defeated Essendon by five points in the 1943 VFL Grand Final.

== Background ==
In 1942, the VFL competition consisted of eleven teams of 18 on-the-field players each (Geelong did not field a team due to wartime rail and road transport restrictions), plus one substitute player, known as the 19th man. A player could be substituted for any reason; however, once substituted, a player could not return to the field of play under any circumstances.

Teams played each other in a home-and-away season of 16 rounds. During the first eleven rounds, each team played each other once, and had one bye which was worth four premiership points; after round 11, the team in last position on the ladder was eliminated from the competition, and the remaining ten teams played five matches each in rounds 12 to 16, with fixtures determined by the league using a pre-arranged and unequal formula under which the higher placed teams would face a more difficult draw. At the end of the home-and-away season, the top four teams based on the full sixteen rounds progressed to a finals series using the Page–McIntyre system to determine the season's premiers.

During the 1943 season, the Melbourne Cricket Ground, Lake Oval and Junction Oval were all appropriated for military use. Melbourne shared the Punt Road Oval with Richmond as their home ground, South Melbourne shared Princes Park with Carlton as their home ground and St Kilda played their home games at Toorak Park (this was possible because there was no VFA competition in 1943); Footscray, however, was able to return to Western Oval, as it was vacated by the defence authorities after a year.

== Home-and-away season ==
=== Round 1 ===
Home team	Home team score	Away team	Away team score	Venue	Crowd	Date
Essendon	18.9 (117)	South Melbourne	13.14 (92)	Windy Hill	16,000	8 May 1943
Collingwood	6.22 (58)	North Melbourne	7.12 (54)	Victoria Park	8,000	8 May 1943
Carlton	17.13 (115)	Richmond	8.23 (71)	Princes Park	17,000	8 May 1943
St Kilda	14.9 (93)	Hawthorn	13.17 (95)	Toorak Park	6,000	8 May 1943
Melbourne	14.12 (96)	Fitzroy	15.9 (99)	Punt Road Oval	9,000	8 May 1943

=== Round 2 ===
Home team	Home team score	Away team	Away team score	Venue	Crowd	Date
North Melbourne	8.14 (62)	St Kilda	8.14 (62)	Arden Street Oval	5,000	15 May 1943
South Melbourne	12.14 (86)	Melbourne	15.19 (109)	Princes Park	6,000	15 May 1943
Hawthorn	7.8 (50)	Essendon	11.15 (81)	Glenferrie Oval	7,000	15 May 1943
Richmond	13.7 (85)	Collingwood	9.12 (66)	Punt Road Oval	16,000	15 May 1943
Footscray	6.10 (46)	Carlton	8.18 (66)	Western Oval	11,000	15 May 1943

=== Round 3 ===
Home team	Home team score	Away team	Away team score	Venue	Crowd	Date
Fitzroy	16.17 (113)	South Melbourne	16.16 (112)	Brunswick Street Oval	15,500	22 May 1943
Essendon	11.12 (78)	North Melbourne	9.11 (65)	Windy Hill	9,000	22 May 1943
Collingwood	11.14 (80)	Footscray	12.16 (88)	Victoria Park	10,000	22 May 1943
St Kilda	8.15 (63)	Richmond	17.12 (114)	Toorak Park	11,000	22 May 1943
Melbourne	10.12 (72)	Hawthorn	17.15 (117)	Punt Road Oval	5,000	22 May 1943

=== Round 4 ===
Home team	Home team score	Away team	Away team score	Venue	Crowd	Date
Footscray	13.11 (89)	St Kilda	6.12 (48)	Western Oval	7,000	29 May 1943
Carlton	12.5 (77)	Collingwood	15.14 (104)	Princes Park	15,000	29 May 1943
North Melbourne	15.14 (104)	Melbourne	10.11 (71)	Arden Street Oval	5,000	29 May 1943
Hawthorn	13.8 (86)	Fitzroy	9.21 (75)	Glenferrie Oval	9,000	29 May 1943
Richmond	11.18 (84)	Essendon	14.13 (97)	Punt Road Oval	23,000	29 May 1943

=== Round 5 ===
Home team	Home team score	Away team	Away team score	Venue	Crowd	Date
Melbourne	17.11 (113)	Richmond	21.15 (141)	Punt Road Oval	13,000	5 June 1943
Fitzroy	23.12 (150)	North Melbourne	10.13 (73)	Brunswick Street Oval	12,000	5 June 1943
Essendon	16.10 (106)	Footscray	16.18 (114)	Windy Hill	18,000	5 June 1943
South Melbourne	10.15 (75)	Hawthorn	12.13 (85)	Princes Park	14,000	5 June 1943
St Kilda	13.14 (92)	Carlton	12.8 (80)	Toorak Park	9,000	5 June 1943

=== Round 6 ===
Home team	Home team score	Away team	Away team score	Venue	Crowd	Date
North Melbourne	14.7 (91)	South Melbourne	12.18 (90)	Arden Street Oval	7,000	12 June 1943
Footscray	21.17 (143)	Melbourne	8.15 (63)	Western Oval	8,000	12 June 1943
Collingwood	11.21 (87)	St Kilda	5.12 (42)	Victoria Park	7,000	12 June 1943
Carlton	9.22 (76)	Essendon	11.16 (82)	Princes Park	17,000	12 June 1943
Richmond	12.17 (89)	Fitzroy	14.11 (95)	Punt Road Oval	19,000	12 June 1943

=== Round 7 ===
Home team	Home team score	Away team	Away team score	Venue	Crowd	Date
Hawthorn	20.16 (136)	North Melbourne	13.17 (95)	Glenferrie Oval	8,000	19 June 1943
Fitzroy	16.11 (107)	Footscray	11.7 (73)	Brunswick Street Oval	18,000	19 June 1943
South Melbourne	12.12 (84)	Richmond	17.12 (114)	Princes Park	11,000	19 June 1943
Essendon	15.13 (103)	Collingwood	8.14 (62)	Windy Hill	11,000	19 June 1943
Melbourne	13.14 (92)	Carlton	11.21 (87)	Punt Road Oval	8,000	19 June 1943

=== Round 8 ===
Home team	Home team score	Away team	Away team score	Venue	Crowd	Date
Footscray	10.11 (71)	South Melbourne	6.14 (50)	Western Oval	7,500	26 June 1943
Collingwood	10.21 (81)	Melbourne	13.9 (87)	Victoria Park	5,000	26 June 1943
Carlton	15.16 (106)	Fitzroy	9.13 (67)	Princes Park	12,000	26 June 1943
Richmond	15.16 (106)	Hawthorn	8.14 (62)	Punt Road Oval	16,000	26 June 1943
St Kilda	15.8 (98)	Essendon	20.19 (139)	Toorak Park	6,000	26 June 1943

=== Round 9 ===
Home team	Home team score	Away team	Away team score	Venue	Crowd	Date
North Melbourne	9.2 (56)	Richmond	13.7 (85)	Arden Street Oval	10,000	3 July 1943
Melbourne	16.14 (110)	St Kilda	12.10 (82)	Punt Road Oval	8,000	3 July 1943
Hawthorn	13.11 (89)	Footscray	11.13 (79)	Glenferrie Oval	16,000	3 July 1943
Fitzroy	15.18 (108)	Collingwood	9.11 (65)	Brunswick Street Oval	14,000	3 July 1943
South Melbourne	10.13 (73)	Carlton	15.13 (103)	Princes Park	13,000	3 July 1943

=== Round 10 ===
Home team	Home team score	Away team	Away team score	Venue	Crowd	Date
Footscray	9.23 (77)	North Melbourne	12.14 (86)	Western Oval	8,000	10 July 1943
Essendon	9.16 (70)	Melbourne	13.7 (85)	Windy Hill	8,000	10 July 1943
Collingwood	9.6 (60)	South Melbourne	16.14 (110)	Victoria Park	8,000	10 July 1943
Carlton	16.9 (105)	Hawthorn	11.14 (80)	Princes Park	12,000	10 July 1943
St Kilda	10.11 (71)	Fitzroy	14.14 (98)	Toorak Park	6,000	10 July 1943

=== Round 11 ===
	Round 11
Saturday, 17 July (2:30 pm)	North Melbourne 12.10 (82)	def.	Carlton 11.12 (78)	Arden Street Oval (crowd: 7,000)	Statistics
Saturday, 17 July (2:30 pm)	Hawthorn 16.14 (110)	def.	Collingwood 12.13 (85)	Glenferrie Oval (crowd: 8,000)	Statistics
Saturday, 17 July (2:30 pm)	Fitzroy 7.14 (56)	def. by	Essendon 9.24 (78)	Brunswick Street Oval (crowd: 14,000)	Statistics
Saturday, 17 July (2:30 pm)	Richmond 10.19 (79)	def.	Footscray 8.9 (57)	Punt Road Oval (crowd: 13,000)	Statistics
Saturday, 17 July (2:30 pm)	South Melbourne 16.19 (115)	def.	St Kilda 11.14 (80)	Princes Park (crowd: 6,000)	Statistics
	Bye; Melbourne

=== Midseason ladder ===
1943 VFL midseason ladder
Pos	Team	Pld	W	L	D	PF	PA	PP	Pts	
1	Essendon	10	8	2	0	951	782	121.6	36	Plays 2nd, 3rd, 4th, 5th, 6th
2	Richmond	10	7	3	0	968	808	119.8	32	Plays 1st, 3rd, 4th, 6th, 7th
3	Fitzroy	10	7	3	0	968	849	114.0	32	Plays 1st, 2nd, 5th, 7th, 9th
4	Hawthorn	10	7	3	0	910	866	105.1	32	Plays 1st, 2nd, 5th, 8th, 10th
5	Carlton	10	5	5	0	893	789	113.2	24	Plays 1st, 3rd, 4th, 8th, 9th
6	Footscray	10	5	5	0	837	774	108.1	24	Plays 1st, 2nd, 7th, 8th, 10th
7	Melbourne	10	5	5	0	898	1010	88.9	24	Plays 2nd, 3rd, 6th, 9th, 10th
8	North Melbourne	10	4	5	1	768	885	86.8	22	Plays 4th, 5th, 6th, 9th, 10th
9	Collingwood	10	3	7	0	748	864	86.6	16	Plays 3rd, 5th, 7th, 8th, 10th
10	South Melbourne	10	2	8	0	887	943	94.1	12	Plays 4th, 6th, 7th, 8th, 9th
11	St Kilda	10	1	8	1	731	989	73.9	10	Eliminated

Source: "How the clubs stand". The Football Record. Vol. 30, no. 14. Melbourne, VIC. 31 July 1943. p. 10.
Rules for classification: 1) points; 2) percentage; 3) number of points for.

=== Round 12 ===
Home team	Home team score	Away team	Away team score	Venue	Crowd	Date
Fitzroy	10.10 (70)	Richmond	7.17 (59)	Brunswick Street Oval	12,000	31 July 1943
South Melbourne	14.11 (95)	North Melbourne	6.6 (42)	Princes Park	8,000	31 July 1943
Melbourne	23.16 (154)	Footscray	11.8 (74)	Punt Road Oval	8,000	31 July 1943
Hawthorn	7.13 (55)	Essendon	9.12 (66)	Glenferrie Oval	12,000	31 July 1943
Collingwood	11.8 (74)	Carlton	28.10 (178)	Victoria Park	8,500	31 July 1943

=== Round 13 ===
Home team	Home team score	Away team	Away team score	Venue	Crowd	Date
Melbourne	9.6 (60)	South Melbourne	21.13 (139)	Punt Road Oval	14,000	7 August 1943
Footscray	7.17 (59)	Richmond	19.19 (133)	Western Oval	9,000	7 August 1943
Essendon	11.24 (90)	Fitzroy	8.8 (56)	Windy Hill	14,000	7 August 1943
Collingwood	14.24 (108)	North Melbourne	7.8 (50)	Victoria Park	5,250	7 August 1943
Carlton	13.19 (97)	Hawthorn	10.15 (75)	Princes Park	15,000	7 August 1943

=== Round 14 ===
Home team	Home team score	Away team	Away team score	Venue	Crowd	Date
Fitzroy	15.14 (104)	Melbourne	7.12 (54)	Brunswick Street Oval	8,000	14 August 1943
Richmond	9.14 (68)	Hawthorn	11.7 (73)	Punt Road Oval	15,000	14 August 1943
North Melbourne	7.11 (53)	Footscray	9.10 (64)	Arden Street Oval	4,000	14 August 1943
South Melbourne	12.18 (90)	Collingwood	11.7 (73)	Princes Park	6,000	14 August 1943
Essendon	9.13 (67)	Carlton	10.10 (70)	Windy Hill	19,000	14 August 1943

=== Round 15 ===
Home team	Home team score	Away team	Away team score	Venue	Crowd	Date
Hawthorn	13.10 (88)	South Melbourne	7.14 (56)	Glenferrie Oval	15,000	21 August 1943
Collingwood	16.17 (113)	Fitzroy	9.9 (63)	Victoria Park	6,500	21 August 1943
Carlton	15.23 (113)	North Melbourne	7.5 (47)	Princes Park	8,000	21 August 1943
Richmond	15.19 (109)	Melbourne	12.13 (85)	Punt Road Oval	9,000	21 August 1943
Footscray	9.10 (64)	Essendon	6.15 (51)	Western Oval	6,000	21 August 1943

=== Round 16 ===
Home team	Home team score	Away team	Away team score	Venue	Crowd	Date
Essendon	10.11 (71)	Richmond	14.14 (98)	Windy Hill	16,000	28 August 1943
North Melbourne	8.11 (59)	Hawthorn	7.16 (58)	Arden Street Oval	4,500	28 August 1943
South Melbourne	10.19 (79)	Footscray	10.6 (66)	Princes Park	4,000	28 August 1943
Melbourne	16.17 (113)	Collingwood	14.17 (101)	Punt Road Oval	5,000	28 August 1943
Fitzroy	12.12 (84)	Carlton	10.9 (69)	Brunswick Street Oval	18,000	28 August 1943

== Ladder ==
(P)	Premiers
	Qualified for finals

#	Team	P	W	L	D	PF	PA	%	Pts
1	Richmond (P)	15	10	5	0	1435	1166	123.1	44
2	Essendon	15	10	5	0	1296	1125	115.2	44
3	Fitzroy	15	10	5	0	1345	1234	109.0	44
4	Carlton	15	9	6	0	1420	1136	125.0	40
5	Hawthorn	15	9	6	0	1259	1212	103.9	40
6	Footscray	15	7	8	0	1164	1244	93.6	32
7	Melbourne	15	7	8	0	1364	1537	88.7	32
8	South Melbourne	15	6	9	0	1346	1272	105.8	28
9	North Melbourne	15	5	9	1	1019	1323	77.0	26
10	Collingwood	15	5	10	0	1217	1358	89.6	24
11	St Kilda	10	1	8	1	731	989	73.9	10

Rules for classification: 1. premiership points; 2. percentage; 3. points for
Average score: 85.0
Source: AFL Tables

== Finals series ==
=== Semi-finals ===
Home team	Score	Away team	Score	Venue	Crowd	Date
Fitzroy	13.16 (94)	Carlton	5.13 (43)	Princes Park	39,874	4 September
Richmond	9.17 (71)	Essendon	13.16 (94)	Princes Park	24,100	11 September

=== Preliminary final ===
Home team	Score	Away team	Score	Venue	Crowd	Date
Richmond	12.14 (86)	Fitzroy	8.13 (61)	Princes Park	27,335	18 September

== Season notes ==
- Hawthorn's coach Roy Cazaly renamed the club "The Hawks" from "The Mayblooms". This season was the closest Hawthorn came to a finals appearance in its first 32 seasons (1925–56) in the VFL, finishing one spot outside the final four only by an inferior percentage to Carlton.
- In the spiteful Round 1 match between Essendon and South Melbourne, a vicious brawl broke out in the last quarter when South Melbourne's Jack "Basher" Williams felled Ted Leehane (apparently in a square-off retribution for Leehane's similar action against Williams in the 1942 preliminary final) which involved a dozen players, team officials, trainers, fans, and police. Three players were reported: Williams received an eight-week suspension for striking Leehane, Dick Reynolds, Gordon Lane, and Perc Bushby, 1940 Brownlow Medal winner Herbie Matthews was suspended for four weeks for striking Allan Hird, and Bushby was suspended for two weeks for striking Williams in retaliation.
- Entering Round 11, St Kilda and South Melbourne were tenth and eleventh on the ladder with two premiership points separating them; as such, the match between those two clubs in Round 11 directly decided which club was eliminated after the first set of home-and-away matches. South Melbourne won the game by 35 points.
- The VFL suspended its Round 12 matches and conducted a one-day lightning carnival amongst the top four teams; the Victorian Football League Patriotic Match Cup was won by Essendon.
- Munitions worker Bob Chitty played for Carlton in Round 15 despite losing the top of his finger during the week in a workplace accident.
- Richmond's centre half-forward Jack Broadstock went Absent Without Leave (AWL) from his Army duties in order to play in the 1943 grand final. He was arrested by the Military Police upon his arrival at Princes Park, and it was only after some very persuasive talking by Richmond captain Jack Dyer, who was himself a policeman with the Victorian Police Force, that Broadstock's commanding officer dropped the matter and allowed him to play in the match. Broadstock went on to kick a goal and be one of Richmond's best players.
- For the first time, no score of four or fewer goals was kicked in a VFL season.

== Awards ==
- The 1943 VFL Premiership team was Richmond.
- The VFL's leading goalkicker was Fred Fanning of Melbourne with 62 goals.
- No Brownlow Medal was awarded in 1943.
- St Kilda took the "wooden spoon" in 1943.
- The seconds premiership was won by St Kilda for the second consecutive season. St Kilda 11.14 (80) defeated Fitzroy 8.6 (54) in the Grand Final, played as a stand-alone match on 18 September at Victoria Park.

== Sources ==
- 1943 VFL season at AFL Tables
- 1943 VFL season at Australian Football
