= Roy Stabb =

Australian rules footballer

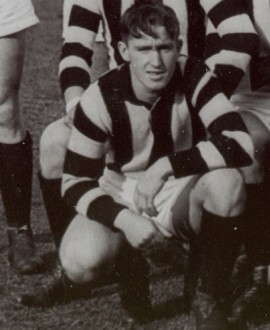
- Stabb during his Collingwood career

Personal information
- Full name: Roy L. Stabb
- Born: 30 November 1922
- Died: 29 December 2010 (aged 88)
- Original team: Fitzroy Colts
- Height: 170 cm (5 ft 7 in)
- Weight: 67 kg (148 lb)

Playing career^{1}
Years	Club	Games (Goals)
1942–44	Collingwood	12 (4)
1945–47	Melbourne	29 (2)
Total		41 (6)
- ^{1} Playing statistics correct to the end of 1947.

Roy Stabb (30 November 1922 – 29 December 2010) was a former Australian rules footballer who played with Collingwood and Melbourne in the Victorian Football League (VFL). Roy was non-playing coach of the Commonwealth Bank Football Club for 10 years, in the VAFA following H.W.Heathershaw and C.J.Weale.
