= Claude Anderson =

Australian rules footballer

Personal information
- Full name: Claude Raymond Anderson
- Born: 11 April 1924; Port Melbourne, Victoria
- Died: 28 June 2010 (aged 86)
- Original team: Port Melbourne Juniors
- Height: 183 cm (6 ft 0 in)
- Weight: 76 kg (168 lb)

Playing career^{1}
Years	Club	Games (Goals)
1947	South Melbourne	2 (0)
- ^{1} Playing statistics correct to the end of 1947.

Claude Raymond Anderson (11 April 1924 – 28 June 2010) was an Australian rules footballer who played with South Melbourne in the Victorian Football League (VFL).

His brother, Syd Anderson played for Melbourne.

== Personal life ==
Anderson served as a corporal in the Australian Army during the Second World War.
