= Alby Rodda =

Australian rules footballer (1920–2002)

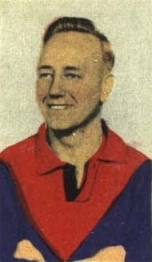

Personal information
- Full name: Albert Rupert Joseph Rodda
- Born: 8 September 1920; Eaglehawk, Victoria
- Died: 15 May 2002 (aged 81); Myrtleford, Victoria
- Original team: State Savings Bank
- Height: 166 cm (5 ft 5 in)
- Weight: 80 kg (176 lb)

Playing career^{1}
Years	Club	Games (Goals)
1939–1950	Melbourne	131 (142)
- ^{1} Playing statistics correct to the end of 1950.

Career highlights
- Keith 'Bluey' Truscott Medal 1949; Melbourne premiership player 1939, 1940, 1948

Albert Rupert Joseph Rodda (8 September 1920 – 15 May 2002) was an Australian rules football player in the Victorian Football League (VFL). Rodda played 50 odd games with the State Savings Bank Football Club in the Amateurs prior to joining Melbourne. He was a member of the Melbourne's VFL premiership teams in 1939, 1940 and 1948. Rodda was a member of Melbourne's 1946 losing VFL grand final team and was Melbourne's best player in the 1948 drawn VFL grand final.

Rodda coached Myrtleford in the Ovens & Murray Football League from 1951 to 1954, and was runner up in the 1955 O&MFL best and fairest award, the Morris Medal in 1955. Rodda then coached Bright in the Ovens & King Football League in 1956 and 1957 and won the club best and fairest in 1957 too.

Rodda also served in the Royal Australian Air Force during World War Two.
