= Ray Hunt (footballer) =

Australian rules footballer

Personal information
- Full name: Raymond Gilbert Hunt
- Born: 6 March 1918; Marryatville, South Australia
- Died: 5 March 1989 (aged 70)
- Debut: Round 13, 1943, Richmond vs. Footsgray, at Western Oval
- Height: 180 cm (5 ft 11 in)
- Weight: 82 kg (181 lb)

Playing career^{1}
| Years | Club | Games (Goals) |
| 1936–1952 | Glenelg | 206 (34) |
| 1943 | Richmond | 6 (2) |
- ^{1} Playing statistics correct to the end of 1952.

Career highlights
- Richmond premiership player 1943; Glenelg best and fairest 1939, 1946; Runner up Magarey Medal 1946; Inducted Glenelg Hall of Fame 2002

Raymond Gilbert Hunt (6 March 1918 – 5 March 1989) was an Australian rules footballer who played for Richmond in the Victorian Football League (VFL) and Glenelg in the South Australian National Football League (SANFL).

Hunt was a full back who played an attacking style.

During his 6 VFL games, in the 1943 season, he managed to kick 2 goals and play in the 1943 premiership side.

Hunt played 206 SANFL games for Glenelg (then a club record) and kicked 34 goals for both the Bays and the West Adelaide-Glenelg war time combination. He was Glenelg's best and fairest award recipient in 1939 and 1946, and was runner-up to Bob Hank of West Torrens in the 1946 Magarey Medal. He represented South Australia 8 times.
