= Billy Deans =

Australian rules footballer

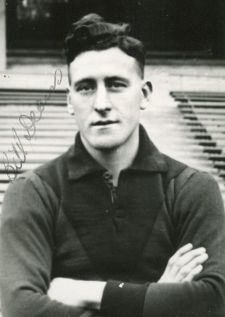

Personal information
- Full name: William Harold Deans
- Born: 2 December 1922; South Melbourne, Victoria
- Died: 7 August 2006 (aged 83)
- Original team: Dandenong
- Height: 170 cm (5 ft 7 in)
- Weight: 76 kg (168 lb)
- Position: Back pocket

Playing career^{1}
| Years | Club | Games (Goals) |
| 1941 | South Melbourne | 1 (1) |
| 1942–1950 | Melbourne | 151 (20) |
| Total | | 152 (21) |
- ^{1} Playing statistics correct to the end of 1950.

William Harold Deans (2 December 1922 – 7 August 2006) was an Australian rules footballer who played for South Melbourne and Melbourne in the Victorian Football League (VFL).

A back pocket from Dandenong, Deans was a regular in defence for Melbourne throughout the decade. He played in the 1946 VFL Grand Final which Melbourne lost but got another chance to play in a premiership in 1948, this time finishing on the winning side, although only after a Grand Final Replay. Deans had started his career at South Melbourne in 1941 but only managed the single senior appearance. After finishing up with the Demons at the end of 1950, he was cleared to Victorian Football Association side Northcote to become playing coach for the 1951 season. Deans was made a life member of the Melbourne Football Club in 1970.
