= Len Dockett =

Australian rules footballer and cricketer

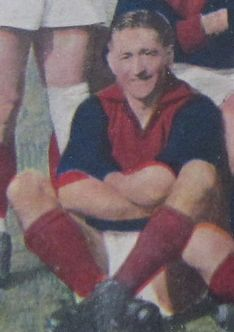

Personal information
- Full name: Leonard Sydney Dockett
- Nicknames: Len, Lenny
- Born: 5 March 1920; Carlton, Victoria
- Died: 1 January 2008 (aged 87); Melbourne
- Original team: Mordialloc
- Height: 175 cm (5 ft 9 in)
- Weight: 73 kg (161 lb)
- Positions: Midfielder, half forward

Playing career^{1}
Years	Club	Games (Goals)
1946–1951	Melbourne	102 (47)

Representative team honours^{2}
Years	Team	Games (Goals)
1950	Victoria	4 (?)
- ^{1} Playing statistics correct to the end of 1951.^{2} Representative statistics correct as of 1950.

Career highlights
- Keith 'Bluey' Truscott Medal, 1949; Melbourne premiership player, 1948

Leonard Sydney Dockett (5 March 1920 – 1 January 2008) was an Australian rules football player in the Victorian Football League, and he also played cricket for the VCA Colts cricket team in the 1938–39 and 1939–40 season, making 22 runs while there, and for Richmond in the 1938–39 and 1955–56 season, with a total of 121 runs. In December 2007, he was awarded a life membership to the Melbourne Football Club.

Dockett was a sergeant in the 14/32 battalion Australian Imperial Force during World War II and served in Papua New Guinea. He died on 1 January 2008, in Melbourne.
