= Harold Ball =

Australian rules footballer

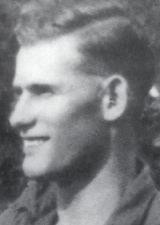

Personal information
- Full name: Harold Charles Ball
- Born: 29 May 1920; Mildura, Victoria, Australia
- Died: 9 February 1942 (aged 21) near Tengah Air Base, Tengah, British Malaya
- Original team: Merbein
- Height: 188 cm (6 ft 2 in)
- Weight: 87 kg (192 lb)
- Position: Ruck

Playing career^{1}
Years	Club	Games (Goals)
1939–1940	Melbourne	33 (33)
- ^{1} Playing statistics correct to the end of 1940.

Career highlights
- 2x VFL premiership player: 1939, 1940

Harold Charles Ball (29 May 1920 – 9 February 1942) was an Australian rules football player for the Melbourne Football Club in the Victorian Football League (VFL), who also served with the 2/9 Field Ambulance, Australian Army Medical Corps.

He was captured, tortured, and executed on 9 February 1942 by the Japanese, during their assault on Singapore that began on 8 January 1942.

== Family ==
The son of George Henry Ball, an engine driver, and Daisy Alma Ball, née Wellington, Ball was born in Mildura, on 29 May 1920.

== Footballer ==
Recruited from Merbein as a ruckman, he worked at the MCG as a groundsman.

He played his first senior VFL game for Melbourne, aged 18, in the first ruck against Jack Dyer and Percy Bentley of Richmond at their peak, at the MCG, on Saturday 22 April 1939 (round one). Ball marked and rucked well in a side that lost by 37 points to Richmond, 11.18 (84) to 17.19 (121).

He played in all of Melbourne's 20 VFL matches in 1939, kicked 30 goals, received three Brownlow Medal votes, was voted best first-year player at Melbourne, and played in the second ruck for the team that won the 1939 Grand-Final by 53 points.

He played in 13 of the possible 21 senior VFL games for Melbourne in 1940.

On Saturday, 21 September 1940, in the Preliminary Final match against Essendon, which Melbourne won by 5 points, 12.18 (90) to 12.13 (85), Ball was the resting forward pocket ruckman. However, in the third quarter, due to injuries to his teammates, Melbourne was forced to shift Ball to full-back. At full-back, on a wet, muddy ground, Ball played what was probably the best game of his career – "Melbourne's best player was Ball, who had no superior on the ground"; "Ball gave such a superlative exhibition at full back that he seems sure to be stationed there against Richmond [on Saturday]" – marking the greasy ball time and time again in torrential rain (some say he took 15 marks), and was single-handedly responsible for Melbourne beating an Essendon team thought a certainty to win.

He played his last VFL game in Melbourne's 1940 Grand Final team, as a back-pocket resting ruckman. He was one of the best players on the ground for the Melbourne team, which unexpectedly beat Richmond by 39 points, 15.17 (107) to 10.8 (68).

== Soldier ==
He enlisted in the Army on 26 July 1940; and, perhaps, influenced by Lieutenant Colonel Jack Jones, the Melbourne's club medical officer, he served in the 2/9 Field Ambulance, Australian Army Medical Corps. He first trained as an ambulance driver in Bonegilla, NSW; then, having embarked on 4 February 1941, arrived in Singapore on 18 February 1941.

His unit moved to Port Dickson, where they were trained in transporting the sick and the wounded. During his time at Port Dickson, he took part in several football matches, and competed in an athletics competition where he won the high jump.

== Death ==
On 8 February 1942, the Japanese began their assault on Singapore, with the Battle of Sarimbun Beach; and Ball's unit was overwhelmed with the task of evacuating the many wounded to a dressing station known as "Hill 80".

Ball was working from a forward dressing station, near the aerodrome at Tengah, and his team were working tirelessly collecting and transporting the wounded.

On the afternoon of 9 February 1942, conditions were such that the medical officer in charge of the dressing station ordered all of his personnel to evacuate to "Hill 80". Ball, along with another driver, Private William Lewis, and ambulance orderly Private Alf Woodman, and the medical officer, Captain John Park, all travelling in the same vehicle, never reached "Hill 80"; and, although despatch riders were sent out to locate the men, they could not be found, and all four were reported "missing", with the hope that they were being held as prisoners of war.

On 9 May 1942, three months later, a working party of Australian prisoners of war, sent out to cut feed for the Japanese horses, found the bodies of the four men. They had all been tortured by the Japanese before they were executed. One of the bodies had its wrists tightly bound with wire. The identity discs on the body identified the soldier as Harold Ball.

== Remembered ==
He is buried at the Kranji War Cemetery in Singapore.

His name is located on panel 86 in the Commemorative Area at the Australian War Memorial. In 1946, the Melbourne Football Club's best first-year player award was officially designated the Harold Ball Memorial Trophy in his honour.

== See also ==
- Lists of solved missing person cases
- List of unsolved murders (1900–1979)
- List of Victorian Football League players who died on active service
