= Gordon Abbott =

Australian rules footballer

Personal information
- Full name: Gordon Allen Abbott
- Born: 26 September 1914; Hobart, Tasmania
- Died: 19 April 1986 (aged 71)
- Original team: Lefroy (TANFL)
- Height: 185 cm (6 ft 1 in)
- Weight: 91 kg (201 lb)

Playing career^{1}
Years	Club	Games (Goals)
1936–1938	Geelong	50 (27)
1941–1947	Essendon	83 (43)
Total		133 (70)
- ^{1} Playing statistics correct to the end of 1947.

Career highlights
- 3x VFL premiership player: 1937, 1942, 1946; Tasmanian Football Hall of Fame

Gordon Allen Abbott (26 September 1914 – 19 April 1986) was an Australian rules footballer who played with Geelong and Essendon in the Victorian Football League (VFL).

== Football ==
Debuting with Geelong in 1936, Abbott spent three years with the club which included being a member of Geelong's 1937 premiership team and kicking two goals in the Grand Final. He played mostly as a Ruckman and a forward.

After a period out of the VFL he returned to the league in 1941 and joined Essendon where he would play in two further premierships, in 1942 and 1946.
