= 1943 VFL Lightning Premiership =

- Season: 1943
- Teams: 4
- Winners: Essendon (1st title)
- Matches played: 3

The 1943 VFL Lightning Premiership was an Australian rules football knockout competition played entirely on Saturday 24, July. It was played during a week's break of the Victorian Football Leagues's 1943 VFL season between rounds 11 and 12, with all games being played at Princes Park. The competition was played as a wartime charities fundraiser between the league's top four clubs. This was the third time a lightning premiership had been contested in the VFL. Approximately 11,000 people attended the three match competition. Essendon won the competition by 8 points, defeating Fitzroy in the final.

== Matches ==
=== Semi finals ===
Home team	Home team score	Away team	Away team score	Ground	Date
Fitzroy	5.4 (34)	Hawthorn	3.6 (24)	Princes Park	Saturday, 24 July
Essendon	2.6 (18)	Richmond	1.2 (8)	Princes Park	Saturday, 24 July

== Grand final ==
Home team	Home team score	Away team	Away team score	Ground	Date
Fitzroy	3.3 (21)	Essendon	4.5 (29)	Princes Park	Saturday, 24 July

== See also ==
- List of Australian Football League night premiers
- Australian Football League pre-season competition
- 1943 VFL season
