= Leo Maguire (footballer) =

Australian rules footballer

Personal information
- Born: 23 June 1920
- Died: 14 November 1979 (aged 59)
- Original team: Terang
- Height: 188 cm (6 ft 2 in)
- Weight: 97 kg (214 lb)

Playing career^{1}
| Years | Club | Games (Goals) |
| 1941–1948 | Richmond | 96 (4) |
- ^{1} Playing statistics correct to the end of 1948.

Career highlights
- Richmond Premiership Player 1943

Leo Maguire (23 June 1920 – 14 November 1979) was an Australian rules footballer who played in the VFL from 1941 to 1948 for the Richmond Football Club.
