= Jack Symons =

Australian rules footballer, born 1912

Personal information
- Born: 11 May 1912
- Died: 23 November 1993 (aged 81)
- Original team: Burnley
- Height: 185 cm (6 ft 1 in)
- Weight: 93 kg (205 lb)

Playing career^{1}
Years	Club	Games (Goals)
1934–1944	Richmond	111 (71)
1944–1946	Fitzroy	36 (58)
Total		147 (129)
- ^{1} Playing statistics correct to the end of 1946.

Career highlights
- Richmond Life Membership 1943; Fitzroy Premiership Player 1944; Interstate games: 1

Jack Symons (11 May 1912 – 23 November 1993) was an Australian rules footballer who played with Richmond and Fitzroy in the Victorian Football League (VFL).

A local, Symons made his debut for Richmond in 1934 and spent a decade with the club. He played in losing grand finals in 1940 and 1942 and when Richmond finally won the premiership in 1943 he was absent from the side.

During the 1944 season he moved to Fitzroy and at the end of the year won the premiership – against his former club, Richmond.
