= Will Dean (entrepreneur) =

British entrepreneur (born 1980)

Will Dean (born 8 November 1980) is a British entrepreneur who was the founder and CEO of endurance event company Tough Mudder and co-founded real-world interactive gaming experience company, Immersive Gamebox (previously Electric Gamebox).

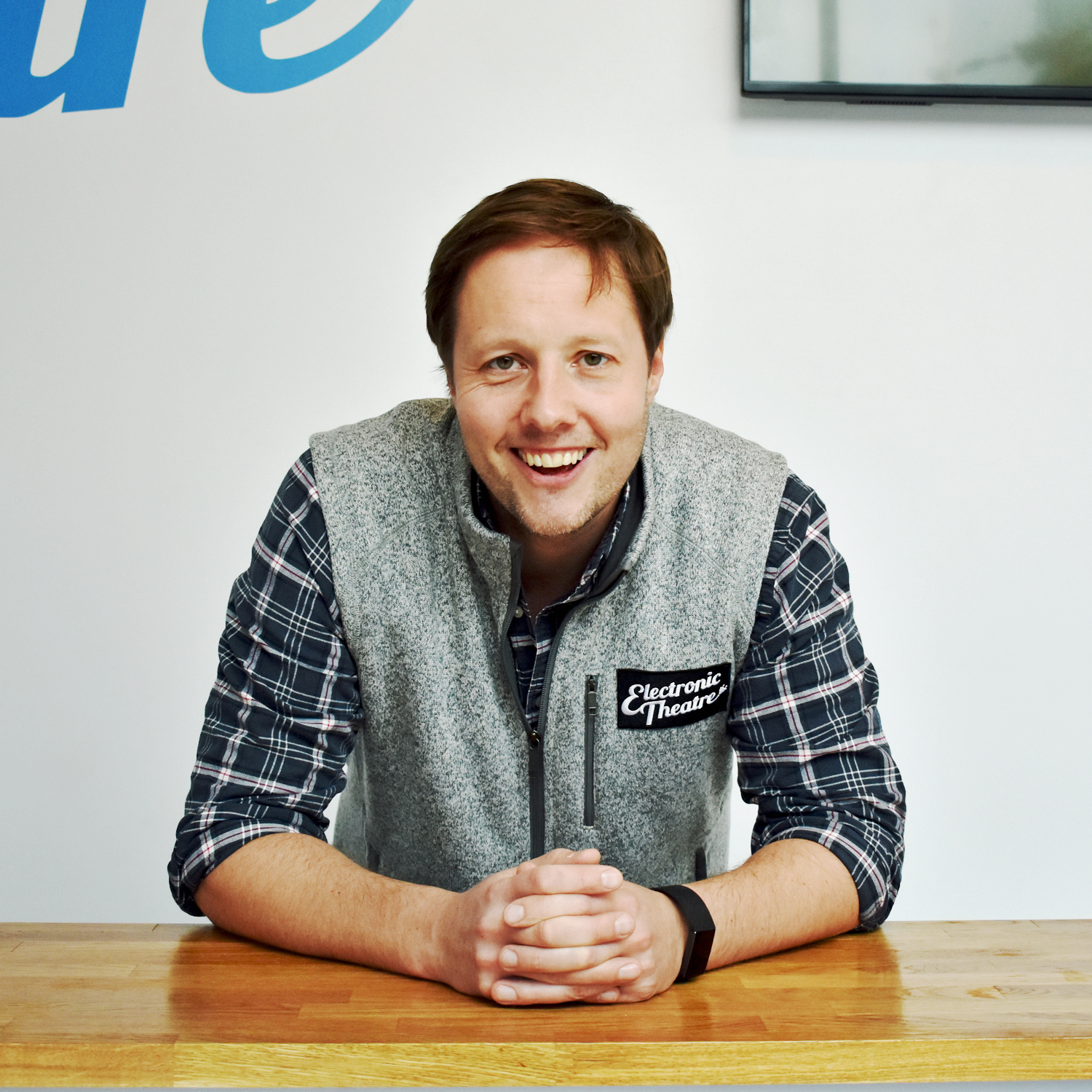

== Biography ==
Born in Sheffield on 8 November 1980, he was educated at Oundle School in Northamptonshire and studied economics at the University of Bristol in the UK.

Dean completed an MBA at Harvard Business School. During his time at Harvard, he founded obstacle course racing company Tough Mudder. He left Tough Mudder in 2019. He published a book about his time at Tough Mudder, It Takes a Tribe, in 2017. Dean is an advocate for 'simplifying the process' in business practices, by 'arriving at the essence of an issue'.

He was named on Crain's annual "40 Under 40" list in 2012, ranked number 2 in Fortune's '40 Under 40: Ones to Watch' list, received the US National EY Entrepreneur Of The Year Emerging Award, was on the Sports Business Journal 40 under 40 in 2017, and received an MBE in 2017.

In 2026, Dean launched CoachCube.AI, which seeks to automate personalised training using artificial intelligence, and is its CEO.
