= Gordon Lane =

Australian rules footballer and coach

Personal information
- Full name: Gordon Francis Lane
- Born: 30 May 1921; Essendon, Victoria
- Died: 21 July 1973 (aged 52); Moorabbin, Victoria
- Original team: Essendon United
- Height: 187 cm (6 ft 2 in)
- Weight: 91 kg (201 lb)

Playing career^{1}
Years	Club	Games (Goals)
1940–1949	Essendon	131 (256)
1950–1952	South Melbourne	47 (94)
Total		178 (350)

Coaching career
Years	Club	Games (W–L–D)
1950–1952	South Melbourne	55 (24–29–2)
- ^{1} Playing statistics correct to the end of 1952.

Career highlights
- Essendon premiership player 1942, 1946 & 1949; South Melbourne leading goalkicker 1950 & 1952

Gordon Francis 'Whopper' Lane (30 May 1921 – 21 July 1973) was an Australian rules footballer who represented Essendon and South Melbourne in the Victorian Football League (VFL).

Making his senior VFL debut in 1940, Lane played as a forward with a strong overhead mark and was rated by Jack Dyer in 1946 as "the best centre half forward in the game".

Lane is best remembered for his performances in Essendon's Grand Finals of the 1940s. In the 1942 VFL Grand Final he kicked six goals and in 1946 kicked seven.

Lane missed out on a chance to play in another Grand Final in 1947 due to breaking his ribs in the preliminary final. He was injured again the following season, this time it was his knee and he moved to South Melbourne in 1950 where served as captain-coach for three years.
