= Murray Exelby =

Australian rules footballer, born 1912

Personal information
- Full name: Murray Exelby
- Born: 11 October 1912
- Died: 21 October 1987 (aged 75)
- Original team: East Brunswick
- Height: 173 cm (5 ft 8 in)
- Weight: 72 kg (159 lb)
- Position: Rover / Half forward flank

Playing career^{1}
Years	Club	Games (Goals)
1935–44	Essendon	113 (102)
- ^{1} Playing statistics correct to the end of 1944.

Murray Exelby (11 October 1912 – 21 October 1987) was an Australian rules footballer who played for Essendon in the Victorian Football League (VFL) for nearly a decade.

Exelby, a rover and half forward flanker, kicked six goals against Melbourne in the opening round of the 1940 VFL season and finished the year with a career best 24 goals. Recruited from East Brunswick, he was a losing Grand Finalist the following season and a premiership player in 1942, with two goals in the Grand Final win over Richmond. In all, he appeared in eight finals during his career.

He spent the 1945 and 1946 seasons at Preston. After coaching stints with Leongatha and Mitcham, Exelby joined Queensland club Mayne as captain-coach in 1950.
