= Adrian Dullard =

Australian rules footballer

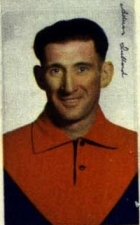

Personal information
- Full name: Adrian Michael Dullard
- Born: 12 January 1918
- Died: 6 November 1989 (aged 71)
- Original teams: Pine Grove, Rochester
- Height: 185 cm (6 ft 1 in)
- Weight: 83 kg (183 lb)
- Positions: Ruckman, Forward

Playing career^{1}
Years	Club	Games (Goals)
1940–1949	Melbourne	116 (143)
- ^{1} Playing statistics correct to the end of 1949.

Career highlights
- Melbourne premiership player 1941, 1948

Adrian Michael Dullard (12 January 1918 – 6 November 1989) was an Australian rules football player in the Victorian Football League (VFL).

Dullard came under notice in 1938 with Rochester, when coached by Stewie Copeland and when he represented the Bendigo Football League in a match against Melbourne in 1938, kicking five goals.

Dullard played in Melbourne's Reserves' 1939 premiership team.

He was a member of the Melbourne premiership team in 1941 and 1948. He kicked the game-tying goal in time-on of the final quarter during the drawn 1948 VFL Grand Final, which set up the following week's replay which Melbourne won.

Dullard played in Melbourne's losing 1946 VFL Grand Final, where he kicked three goals.

Dullard spent 1944 in the Australian Army.

Dullard captain-coached Williamstown in the Victorian Football Association (VFA) in 1950 and 1951, and then continued on as a player in 1952 and 1953. He was vice-captain in the latter season. He won the most consistent player award in 1952 and played a total of 82 games for the Seagulls, kicking 111 goals.

Dullard's son, Anthony Dullard, also played for Melbourne and Williamstown.
