= Syd Anderson (footballer, born 1949) =

Australian rules footballer

Personal information
- Full name: Syd Anderson
- Born: 9 March 1949 (age 77)
- Original team: Port Melbourne (VFA)

Playing career^{1}
Years	Club	Games (Goals)
1976	South Melbourne	4 (0)
- ^{1} Playing statistics correct to the end of 1976.

Syd Anderson (born 9 March 1949) is a former Australian rules footballer who played with South Melbourne in the Victorian Football League (VFL). He is the brother of Collingwood player Graham Anderson.
