= Jack Caesar =

Australian rules footballer, born 1917

Personal information
- Full name: John Francis Caesar
- Born: 5 January 1917; Footscray, Victoria
- Died: 18 June 2004 (aged 87)
- Original team: Ascot Vale
- Height: 165 cm (5 ft 5 in)
- Weight: 67 kg (148 lb)

Playing career^{1}
Years	Club	Games (Goals)
1938–42	Essendon	75 (15)
- ^{1} Playing statistics correct to the end of 1942.

John Francis "Jules" Caesar (5 January 1917 – 18 June 2004) was an Australian rules footballer who played for Essendon in the Victorian Football League (VFL).

Recruited from Ascot Vale, Caesar was a wingman in Essendon's 1942 premiership team, after playing in a Grand Final loss the previous year. He fought in the Pacific Islands during the war and played at Yarraville when he returned in 1946.
