= Jack Cotter =

Australian rules footballer (1915–1976)

Personal information
- Full name: John Francis Cotter
- Born: 8 January 1915; Geelong, Victoria
- Died: 27 July 1976 (aged 61); Geelong, Victoria
- Original team: North Williamstown
- Height: 180 cm (5 ft 11 in)
- Weight: 80 kg (176 lb)

Playing career^{1}
Years	Club	Games (Goals)
1935–1941	Richmond	105 (0)
1946	South Melbourne	9 (0)
Total		114 (0)
- ^{1} Playing statistics correct to the end of 1946.

Career highlights
- Richmond Seconds Best & Fairest 1934

Jack Cotter (8 January 1915 – 27 July 1976) was an Australian rules footballer who played in the VFL between 1935 and 1941 for the Richmond Football Club and in 1946 for the South Melbourne Football Club.

Serving in the Australian Army between 1942 and 1946, Cotter went on to become Captain/Coach of Golden Point, Golden Square, Dunkeld, Alexandra, Yarck and Dunolly, leading his teams to Premierships in 1947 (Golden Point), 1952 (Alexandra) and 1958 (Dunolly).
