= Anthony Dullard =

Australian rules footballer

Personal information
- Full name: Anthony Dullard
- Born: 13 July 1955 (age 71)
- Original team: North Melbourne Old Boys
- Height: 193 cm (6 ft 4 in)
- Weight: 93 kg (205 lb)

Playing career^{1}
Years	Club	Games (Goals)
1973–1981	Melbourne	108 (49)
- ^{1} Playing statistics correct to the end of 1981.

Anthony Dullard (born 13 July 1955) is a former Australian rules footballer who played for the Melbourne Football Club in the Victorian Football League (VFL).
