= 1946 VFL season =

50th season of the Victorian Football League (VFL)

1946 VFL premiership season
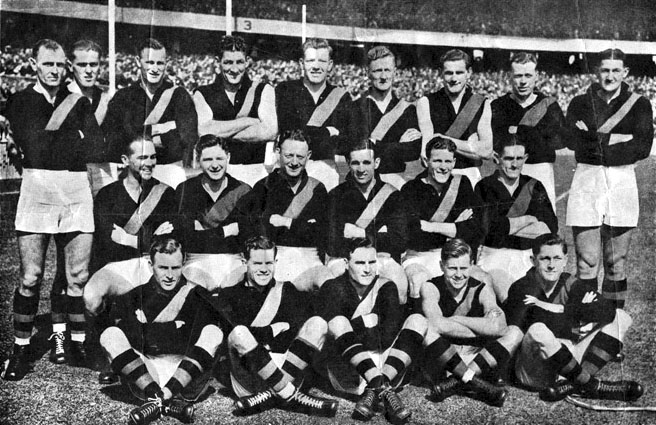
- Essendon Football Club team, premiers
- Teams: 12
- Premiers: Essendon; 8th premiership
- Minor premiers: Essendon; 8th minor premiership
- Brownlow Medallist: Don Cordner (Melbourne)
- Leading goalkicker medallist: Des Fothergill (Collingwood)
- Matches played: 119
- Highest: 77,370

The 1946 VFL season was the 50th season of the Victorian Football League (VFL), the highest level senior Australian rules football competition in Victoria.

The season featured twelve clubs, ran from 20 April until 5 October, and comprised a 19-game home-and-away season followed by a finals series featuring the top four clubs. The league's thirds/under-19s competition played its inaugural season.

The premiership was won by the Essendon Football Club for the eighth time, after it defeated Melbourne by 63 points in the 1946 VFL Grand Final.

== Background ==
In 1946, the VFL competition consisted of twelve teams of 18 on-the-field players each, plus two substitute players, known as the 19th man and the 20th man. A player could be substituted for any reason; however, once substituted, a player could not return to the field of play under any circumstances.

Teams played each other in a home-and-away season of 19 rounds; matches 12 to 19 were the "home-and-away reverse" of matches 1 to 8.

The determination of the 1946 season's fixtures were complicated by the fact that both the Melbourne Cricket Ground and the Lake Oval were still unavailable and, because of this, Melbourne shared the Punt Road Oval with Richmond as their home ground, and South Melbourne shared the Junction Oval with St Kilda as their home ground. Melbourne resumed using the Melbourne Cricket Ground as its home ground in round 17.

Once the 19 round home-and-away season had finished, the 1946 VFL Premiers were determined by the specific format and conventions of the Page–McIntyre system.

== Home-and-away season ==
=== Round 1 ===
Home team	Home team score	Away team	Away team score	Venue	Crowd	Date
Fitzroy	12.11 (83)	Richmond	12.15 (87)	Brunswick Street Oval	32,000	20 April 1946
Melbourne	20.17 (137)	Geelong	12.19 (91)	Punt Road Oval	18,000	20 April 1946
Footscray	15.10 (100)	Essendon	14.14 (98)	Western Oval	26,000	20 April 1946
North Melbourne	19.23 (137)	St Kilda	12.6 (78)	Arden Street Oval	11,000	22 April 1946
Hawthorn	7.19 (61)	Collingwood	18.16 (124)	Glenferrie Oval	19,000	22 April 1946
South Melbourne	16.13 (109)	Carlton	18.9 (117)	Junction Oval	38,000	22 April 1946

=== Round 2 ===
Home team	Home team score	Away team	Away team score	Venue	Crowd	Date
Geelong	15.14 (104)	Hawthorn	9.19 (73)	Kardinia Park	7,500	27 April 1946
Essendon	10.11 (71)	South Melbourne	8.5 (53)	Windy Hill	16,000	27 April 1946
Collingwood	10.14 (74)	Fitzroy	8.10 (58)	Victoria Park	22,000	27 April 1946
Carlton	9.12 (66)	Melbourne	10.12 (72)	Princes Park	21,000	27 April 1946
Richmond	15.15 (105)	North Melbourne	19.19 (133)	Punt Road Oval	23,000	27 April 1946
St Kilda	11.3 (69)	Footscray	16.21 (117)	Junction Oval	14,000	27 April 1946

=== Round 3 ===
Home team	Home team score	Away team	Away team score	Venue	Crowd	Date
Richmond	16.14 (110)	St Kilda	6.15 (51)	Punt Road Oval	17,000	4 May 1946
Fitzroy	20.19 (139)	Geelong	9.9 (63)	Brunswick Street Oval	12,000	4 May 1946
Essendon	21.15 (141)	Melbourne	12.13 (85)	Windy Hill	17,000	4 May 1946
South Melbourne	12.14 (86)	Footscray	14.18 (102)	Junction Oval	25,000	4 May 1946
North Melbourne	10.14 (74)	Collingwood	12.12 (84)	Arden Street Oval	30,000	4 May 1946
Hawthorn	15.11 (101)	Carlton	19.17 (131)	Glenferrie Oval	16,000	4 May 1946

=== Round 4 ===
Home team	Home team score	Away team	Away team score	Venue	Crowd	Date
Melbourne	12.15 (87)	South Melbourne	11.8 (74)	Punt Road Oval	18,000	11 May 1946
Geelong	11.18 (84)	North Melbourne	19.12 (126)	Kardinia Park	11,500	11 May 1946
Footscray	19.19 (133)	Richmond	17.10 (112)	Western Oval	27,000	11 May 1946
Carlton	6.16 (52)	Fitzroy	16.18 (114)	Princes Park	30,000	11 May 1946
Hawthorn	8.6 (54)	Essendon	24.13 (157)	Glenferrie Oval	10,000	11 May 1946
St Kilda	13.7 (85)	Collingwood	14.20 (104)	Junction Oval	15,000	11 May 1946

=== Round 5 ===
Home team	Home team score	Away team	Away team score	Venue	Crowd	Date
Geelong	11.8 (74)	St Kilda	13.17 (95)	Kardinia Park	9,000	18 May 1946
Essendon	11.13 (79)	Fitzroy	4.15 (39)	Windy Hill	17,000	18 May 1946
Collingwood	2.16 (28)	Richmond	14.10 (94)	Victoria Park	24,000	18 May 1946
Carlton	11.15 (81)	North Melbourne	9.11 (65)	Princes Park	19,000	18 May 1946
South Melbourne	11.21 (87)	Hawthorn	6.17 (53)	Junction Oval	10,000	18 May 1946
Melbourne	12.13 (85)	Footscray	22.14 (146)	Punt Road Oval	18,000	18 May 1946

=== Round 6 ===
Home team	Home team score	Away team	Away team score	Venue	Crowd	Date
Hawthorn	16.10 (106)	Melbourne	13.13 (91)	Glenferrie Oval	8,000	25 May 1946
Fitzroy	7.21 (63)	South Melbourne	10.12 (72)	Brunswick Street Oval	18,000	25 May 1946
Richmond	21.23 (149)	Geelong	13.9 (87)	Punt Road Oval	15,000	25 May 1946
North Melbourne	5.13 (43)	Essendon	11.17 (83)	Arden Street Oval	18,000	25 May 1946
Footscray	10.12 (72)	Collingwood	9.15 (69)	Western Oval	29,000	25 May 1946
St Kilda	10.12 (72)	Carlton	22.17 (149)	Junction Oval	19,000	25 May 1946

=== Round 7 ===
Home team	Home team score	Away team	Away team score	Venue	Crowd	Date
Essendon	20.20 (140)	St Kilda	7.16 (58)	Windy Hill	11,000	1 June 1946
Carlton	15.13 (103)	Richmond	11.10 (76)	Princes Park	42,000	1 June 1946
South Melbourne	10.16 (76)	North Melbourne	10.10 (70)	Junction Oval	17,000	1 June 1946
Hawthorn	13.12 (90)	Footscray	14.15 (99)	Glenferrie Oval	13,000	1 June 1946
Melbourne	5.11 (41)	Fitzroy	14.13 (97)	Punt Road Oval	12,000	1 June 1946
Geelong	10.8 (68)	Collingwood	20.12 (132)	Kardinia Park	10,000	1 June 1946

=== Round 8 ===
Home team	Home team score	Away team	Away team score	Venue	Crowd	Date
Fitzroy	14.14 (98)	Hawthorn	9.10 (64)	Brunswick Street Oval	12,000	8 June 1946
North Melbourne	9.2 (56)	Melbourne	3.9 (27)	Arden Street Oval	8,000	8 June 1946
Richmond	10.10 (70)	Essendon	15.17 (107)	Punt Road Oval	38,000	8 June 1946
St Kilda	7.5 (47)	South Melbourne	15.22 (112)	Junction Oval	17,000	10 June 1946
Footscray	16.22 (118)	Geelong	7.13 (55)	Western Oval	15,000	10 June 1946
Collingwood	16.16 (112)	Carlton	7.14 (56)	Victoria Park	40,000	10 June 1946

=== Round 9 ===
Home team	Home team score	Away team	Away team score	Venue	Crowd	Date
Melbourne	14.12 (96)	St Kilda	8.9 (57)	Punt Road Oval	11,000	15 June 1946
Footscray	16.10 (106)	Fitzroy	15.9 (99)	Western Oval	22,000	15 June 1946
Essendon	16.22 (118)	Collingwood	11.10 (76)	Windy Hill	32,000	15 June 1946
Hawthorn	17.20 (122)	North Melbourne	14.13 (97)	Glenferrie Oval	14,000	17 June 1946
Carlton	18.20 (128)	Geelong	13.11 (89)	Princes Park	17,000	17 June 1946
South Melbourne	18.16 (124)	Richmond	15.20 (110)	Junction Oval	38,000	17 June 1946

=== Round 10 ===
Home team	Home team score	Away team	Away team score	Venue	Crowd	Date
Collingwood	18.17 (125)	South Melbourne	12.12 (84)	Victoria Park	26,000	22 June 1946
Carlton	12.20 (92)	Footscray	13.10 (88)	Princes Park	39,000	22 June 1946
Richmond	9.16 (70)	Melbourne	13.8 (86)	Punt Road Oval	18,000	22 June 1946
St Kilda	10.24 (84)	Hawthorn	9.12 (66)	Junction Oval	8,000	22 June 1946
North Melbourne	15.8 (98)	Fitzroy	13.10 (88)	Arden Street Oval	12,000	22 June 1946
Geelong	18.18 (126)	Essendon	12.15 (87)	Kardinia Park	11,500	22 June 1946

=== Round 11 ===
Home team	Home team score	Away team	Away team score	Venue	Crowd	Date
Hawthorn	9.6 (60)	Richmond	14.14 (98)	Glenferrie Oval	11,000	6 July 1946
Footscray	18.9 (117)	North Melbourne	9.12 (66)	Western Oval	18,000	6 July 1946
Fitzroy	12.14 (86)	St Kilda	7.11 (53)	Brunswick Street Oval	7,000	6 July 1946
South Melbourne	12.19 (91)	Geelong	7.12 (54)	Junction Oval	9,000	6 July 1946
Melbourne	13.13 (91)	Collingwood	10.9 (69)	Punt Road Oval	17,000	6 July 1946
Essendon	12.12 (84)	Carlton	9.9 (63)	Windy Hill	29,000	6 July 1946

=== Round 12 ===
Home team	Home team score	Away team	Away team score	Venue	Crowd	Date
Geelong	15.7 (97)	Melbourne	21.14 (140)	Kardinia Park	11,500	13 July 1946
Essendon	16.24 (120)	Footscray	14.8 (92)	Windy Hill	29,000	13 July 1946
Collingwood	15.23 (113)	Hawthorn	11.14 (80)	Victoria Park	11,000	13 July 1946
Carlton	12.13 (85)	South Melbourne	11.18 (84)	Princes Park	26,000	13 July 1946
St Kilda	10.14 (74)	North Melbourne	12.11 (83)	Junction Oval	7,000	13 July 1946
Richmond	14.14 (98)	Fitzroy	10.12 (72)	Punt Road Oval	19,000	13 July 1946

=== Round 13 ===
Home team	Home team score	Away team	Away team score	Venue	Crowd	Date
North Melbourne	6.11 (47)	Richmond	11.9 (75)	Arden Street Oval	10,000	20 July 1946
Footscray	5.11 (41)	St Kilda	6.10 (46)	Western Oval	10,000	20 July 1946
Hawthorn	15.22 (112)	Geelong	11.15 (81)	Glenferrie Oval	5,000	20 July 1946
South Melbourne	9.13 (67)	Essendon	10.8 (68)	Junction Oval	23,000	20 July 1946
Fitzroy	8.8 (56)	Collingwood	8.13 (61)	Brunswick Street Oval	15,000	20 July 1946
Melbourne	10.12 (72)	Carlton	7.13 (55)	Punt Road Oval	26,000	20 July 1946

=== Round 14 ===
Home team	Home team score	Away team	Away team score	Venue	Crowd	Date
Footscray	12.12 (84)	South Melbourne	4.7 (31)	Western Oval	21,000	27 July 1946
Collingwood	17.19 (121)	North Melbourne	9.16 (70)	Victoria Park	14,000	27 July 1946
Carlton	15.18 (108)	Hawthorn	10.11 (71)	Princes Park	17,000	27 July 1946
St Kilda	9.9 (63)	Richmond	16.16 (112)	Junction Oval	12,000	27 July 1946
Geelong	9.9 (63)	Fitzroy	8.7 (55)	Kardinia Park	10,000	27 July 1946
Melbourne	9.24 (78)	Essendon	10.13 (73)	Punt Road Oval	30,000	27 July 1946

=== Round 15 ===
Home team	Home team score	Away team	Away team score	Venue	Crowd	Date
Essendon	21.18 (144)	Hawthorn	12.7 (79)	Windy Hill	12,000	3 August 1946
Collingwood	15.24 (114)	St Kilda	10.9 (69)	Victoria Park	12,000	3 August 1946
South Melbourne	15.16 (106)	Melbourne	14.11 (95)	Junction Oval	22,000	3 August 1946
North Melbourne	15.10 (100)	Geelong	6.12 (48)	Arden Street Oval	7,500	3 August 1946
Richmond	12.21 (93)	Footscray	14.15 (99)	Punt Road Oval	31,000	3 August 1946
Fitzroy	14.10 (94)	Carlton	11.8 (74)	Brunswick Street Oval	21,000	3 August 1946

=== Round 16 ===
Home team	Home team score	Away team	Away team score	Venue	Crowd	Date
Hawthorn	12.15 (87)	South Melbourne	16.14 (110)	Glenferrie Oval	13,000	10 August 1946
Footscray	13.13 (91)	Melbourne	16.16 (112)	Western Oval	23,000	10 August 1946
St Kilda	20.10 (130)	Geelong	8.11 (59)	Junction Oval	6,000	10 August 1946
Fitzroy	14.18 (102)	Essendon	7.16 (58)	Brunswick Street Oval	16,000	10 August 1946
Richmond	18.9 (117)	Collingwood	12.15 (87)	Punt Road Oval	32,000	10 August 1946
North Melbourne	13.9 (87)	Carlton	10.18 (78)	Arden Street Oval	16,000	10 August 1946

=== Round 17 ===
Home team	Home team score	Away team	Away team score	Venue	Crowd	Date
Geelong	13.11 (89)	Richmond	16.11 (107)	Kardinia Park	11,000	17 August 1946
Essendon	18.14 (122)	North Melbourne	4.10 (34)	Windy Hill	16,000	17 August 1946
Collingwood	20.12 (132)	Footscray	10.10 (70)	Victoria Park	25,000	17 August 1946
Carlton	14.8 (92)	St Kilda	10.17 (77)	Princes Park	13,000	17 August 1946
Melbourne	18.15 (123)	Hawthorn	13.8 (86)	MCG	16,000	17 August 1946
South Melbourne	7.16 (58)	Fitzroy	12.15 (87)	Junction Oval	18,000	17 August 1946

=== Round 18 ===
Home team	Home team score	Away team	Away team score	Venue	Crowd	Date
North Melbourne	11.8 (74)	South Melbourne	15.19 (109)	Arden Street Oval	7,000	24 August 1946
Footscray	23.27 (165)	Hawthorn	8.5 (53)	Western Oval	12,000	24 August 1946
Fitzroy	9.11 (65)	Melbourne	10.9 (69)	Brunswick Street Oval	19,000	24 August 1946
Collingwood	17.26 (128)	Geelong	7.11 (53)	Victoria Park	11,000	24 August 1946
St Kilda	11.9 (75)	Essendon	16.20 (116)	Junction Oval	9,000	24 August 1946
Richmond	16.29 (125)	Carlton	13.15 (93)	Punt Road Oval	38,000	24 August 1946

=== Round 19 ===
Home team	Home team score	Away team	Away team score	Venue	Crowd	Date
Melbourne	17.11 (113)	North Melbourne	11.10 (76)	MCG	19,000	31 August 1946
Essendon	16.18 (114)	Richmond	18.5 (113)	Windy Hill	23,000	31 August 1946
Carlton	15.11 (101)	Collingwood	14.12 (96)	Princes Park	27,000	31 August 1946
South Melbourne	14.10 (94)	St Kilda	6.13 (49)	Junction Oval	10,000	31 August 1946
Geelong	17.18 (120)	Footscray	12.5 (77)	Kardinia Park	12,000	31 August 1946
Hawthorn	9.15 (69)	Fitzroy	12.22 (94)	Glenferrie Oval	6,000	31 August 1946

== Ladder ==
(P)	Premiers
	Qualified for finals

#	Team	P	W	L	D	PF	PA	%	Pts
1	Essendon (P)	19	15	4	0	1980	1407	140.7	60
2	Collingwood	19	13	6	0	1849	1477	125.2	52
3	Footscray	19	13	6	0	1917	1628	117.8	52
4	Melbourne	19	13	6	0	1700	1622	104.8	52
5	Richmond	19	11	8	0	1921	1659	115.8	44
6	Carlton	19	11	8	0	1724	1688	102.1	44
7	South Melbourne	19	10	9	0	1627	1528	106.5	40
8	Fitzroy	19	9	10	0	1589	1339	118.7	36
9	North Melbourne	19	8	11	0	1536	1685	91.2	32
10	Geelong	19	4	15	0	1505	2124	70.9	16
11	St Kilda	19	4	15	0	1332	1902	70.0	16
12	Hawthorn	19	3	16	0	1487	2108	70.5	12

Rules for classification: 1. premiership points; 2. percentage; 3. points for
Average score: 88.5
Source: AFL Tables

== Finals series ==
=== Semi-finals ===
Home team	Score	Away team	Score	Venue	Crowd	Date
Footscray	15.12 (102)	Melbourne	17.18 (120)	MCG	61,277	7 September
Essendon	14.16 (100)	Collingwood	13.22 (100)	MCG	77,370	14 September
Essendon	10.16 (76)	Collingwood	8.9 (57)	MCG	64,903	21 September

=== Preliminary final ===
Home team	Score	Away team	Score	Venue	Crowd	Date
Collingwood	14.16 (100)	Melbourne	16.17 (113)	MCG	59,444	28 September

== Season notes ==
- The ANFC introduced a second substitute player, known as the 20th man; this meant that a team was now composed of 18 "run on" players, and two "reserves" on the bench. A player could be substituted for any reason (not just if he was injured and unable to continue). Once substituted, a player could not return to the field of play under any circumstances. As with the 19th man, the 20th man was paid a match fee only in the event that he took the field.
- The ANFC rejected a joint proposal from New South Wales and Tasmania to introduce an "order off" rule for foul play.
- The VFL introduced a new Under-19 competition; the teams are referred to as the Third Eighteens.
- The VFL resumes the Brownlow Medal award.
- In Round 1, 33-year-old former champion full-forward Bob Pratt returned to South Melbourne after playing for VFA club Coburg (1940–1941) and serving in the Royal Australian Air Force (1942–1945). He kicked two goals before badly injuring a leg, and never played again.
- In Round 2, North Melbourne won its first ever VFL away match against Richmond, having lost the previous 15 meetings.
- North Melbourne fail to score in the first and third quarters of the Round 8 match Melbourne due to strong winds, but still win by 29 points.
- From ninth position on the ladder at the end of Round 8, Melbourne won 13 of its next 14 matches and play in the Grand Final.
- At half time in the closely contested Grand Final, a straighter-kicking Melbourne 10.4 (64) was three points in front of Essendon 9.7 (61); in the third quarter Essendon kicked 11.8 (74) to Melbourne's 1.1 (7).

== Awards ==
- The 1946 VFL Premiership team was Essendon.
- The VFL's leading goalkicker was Bill Brittingham of Essendon with 66 goals, including 8 goals in the finals series. Des Fothergill of Collingwood was the leading goal-kicker in the home-and-home season, with 63 goals.
- The winner of the 1946 Brownlow Medal was Don Cordner of Melbourne with 20 votes. Cordner was the first of the only two amateur players ever to win the Brownlow Medal; the second was Footscray's John Schultz in 1960.
- Hawthorn took the "wooden spoon" in 1946.
- The seconds premiership was won by Richmond. Richmond 7.15 (57) defeated Fitzroy 7.14 (56) in the Grand Final, played as a curtain-raiser to the senior preliminary final on Saturday 28 September at the Melbourne Cricket Ground.
- The inaugural thirds premiership was won by North Melbourne (main: 1946 VFL thirds season)

== Sources ==
- 1946 VFL season at AFL Tables
- 1946 VFL season at Australian Football
