= Ron Barassi Sr. =

Australian rules footballer (1913–1941)

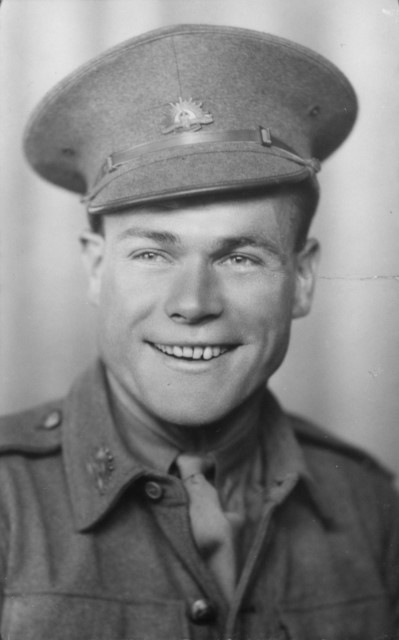
- Barassi circa 1940

Personal information
- Full name: Ronald James Barassi
- Born: 24 October 1913; Castlemaine, Australia
- Died: 30 July 1941 (aged 27); Tobruk, Italian Libya
- Original team: Castlemaine
- Height: 173 cm (5 ft 8 in)
- Weight: 72 kg (159 lb)
- Position: Rover

Playing career^{1}
Years	Club	Games (Goals)
1936–1940	Melbourne	58 (84)
- ^{1} Playing statistics correct to the end of 1940.

Career highlights
- Melbourne 1940 premiership side

Ronald James Barassi (24 October 1913 – 30 July 1941) was an Australian rules footballer who played for the Melbourne Football Club in the Victorian Football League (VFL). He was the father of Hall of Famer Ron Barassi Jr.

At the height of his football career, he enlisted in the army during the Second World War and was killed during the Siege of Tobruk.

== Biography ==
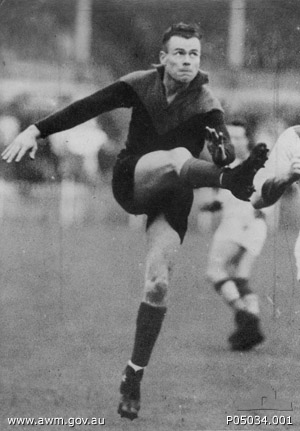
Barassi playing for Melbourne in 1939

Barassi's grandfather was Swiss of Italian speaking background who migrated to the Colony of Victoria in the 1850/60s. The family group settled in areas such as Guildford, Castlemaine, and Daylesford.

He initially played for the Castlemaine Football Club, becoming a rover and made his debut for the Melbourne Football Club in 1936. His final VFL match was the Melbourne Football Club's victorious 1940 grand final in which he started as the 19th man.

He joined the army soon after the 1940 VFL season, like many other footballers from the Melbourne Football Club. Serving in the military campaign in North Africa, he was killed in action at Tobruk in 1941, the first VFL footballer to die in the conflict. He was buried at the Tobruk War Cemetery in Libya, alongside other Commonwealth servicemen.

== See also ==
- List of Victorian Football League players who died on active service
- The Rats of Tobruk
