= Col McLean =

Australian rules footballer

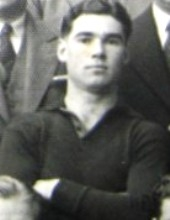

Personal information
- Born: 5 August 1920
- Died: 20 June 1999 (aged 78)
- Original team: Hamilton
- Debut: Round 11, 1940, Melbourne vs. South Melbourne, at Lake Oval
- Height: 178 cm (5 ft 10 in)
- Weight: 81 kg (179 lb)

Playing career^{1}
| Years | Club | Games (Goals) |
| 1940–41, 1944–49 | Melbourne | 138 (1) |
- ^{1} Playing statistics correct to the end of 1949.

Colin "Col" McLean (5 August 1920 – 20 June 1999) was an Australian rules footballer who played with Melbourne in the VFL during the 1940s.

McLean was a half back flanker for Melbourne and played in three premiership sides, going back to back in 1940 and 1941, followed by another premiership in 1948. He missed the 1942 and 1943 seasons due to the war. As he was always used in defence he kicked only one goal in his career which came in his 46th game, in Melbourne's 1945 encounter against North Melbourne at Punt Road. He represented the Victorian interstate team twice in 1948.
