= Doug Bigelow =

Australian rules footballer and coach

Personal information
- Full name: Douglas Hamilton Bigelow
- Born: 17 July 1928
- Died: 21 June 1996 (aged 67); Queensland
- Original team: Bentleigh
- Height: 184 cm (6 ft 0 in)
- Weight: 96 kg (212 lb)

Playing career^{1}
Years	Club	Games (Goals)
1947–1956	Essendon	148 (27)

Coaching career
Years	Club	Games (W–L–D)
1957–1961	Coburg (VFA)	102 (65–36–1)
- ^{1} Playing statistics correct to the end of 1956.

Career highlights
- Essendon Grand Final team: 1948 ("drawn" match only), 1951; Essendon Football Club life member: 1956; Essendon Football Club committee: 1954, 1956, 1964–76

Douglas Hamilton Bigelow (17 July 1928 – 21 June 1996) was an Australian rules footballer who played 148 senior games for the Essendon Football Club from 1947 to 1956.

== Family ==
The son of Hiram Alfred "Jack" Bigelow (1902-1967), and Eva Nellie Bigelow (1901-1989), née Hough, Douglas Hamilton Bigelow was born on 17 July 1928.

He married Shirley June Nankervis in 1951. They had two children: Ross, and Janine.

== Career ==
Recruited from Bentleigh Football Club, he played his first match in round 11 of the 1947 season, against Melbourne, at Essendon's home ground, Windy Hill. He went on to play 148 games for Essendon from 1947 to 1956.

He played in the "drawn" 1948 Grand Final, but was not selected for the "Grand Final Replay" the following week. He played in the losing Essendon Grand Final team in 1951.

He played in the second ruck in the highly talented 1952 Essendon Seconds Premiership team that beat Collingwood Seconds 7.14 (56) to 4.5 (29):

		Essendon	
Backs	Alan Thaw	Jack Knowles	Doug Bigelow
H/Backs	Brian Paine	John Ramsay	Bob Taylor
Centre Line	Keith McIntosh	Hugh Morris	Alby Law
H/Forwards	Greg Sewell	Bill Snell	Ray Martini
Forwards	Brian Gilmore	Ken Reed	Stan Booth
Rucks/Rover	Allan Hird (c/c)	Geoff Leek	Allan Taylor
Reserves	Mal Pascoe	Ian Monks	

Excluding the senior games that some had already played (or would go on to play) with other VFL clubs, the members of the Essendon 1952 Seconds Premiership Team played an aggregate total of 1072 senior games for Essendon Firsts.

Bigelow also played in the Essendon Finals teams of 1953, which lost to Footscray 5.11 (41) to 6.13 (49), and of 1955, which lost to Geelong 7.11 (53) to 9.7 (61).

He was Acting Captain of the Essendon team on three occasions in 1956.

He was considered to be a strong and tenacious defender, who also played in the ruck. His strength also gave him an advantage in boundary throw-ins.

== Retirement ==
His last game for Essendon was in the first (1956) VFL night football series, held at the end of the 1956 home-and-away season, under floodlights, at Lake Oval, at Albert Park,

He coached the Victorian Football Association team Coburg Tigers from 1957 until 1961.

He also coached at his original club, Bentleigh, in 1963.

He served on the Essendon Football Club Committee from 1964 to 1976, having also served in 1954 and 1956 (whilst still a player).

== Media ==
Almost from the inception of Australian television (November 1956), along with Percy Beames, Thorold Merrett, Doug Heywood, and Tony Ongarello, Bigelow featured in various football shows on ABC Television.

He also worked for many years as a radio commentator on Melbourne's 3LO and, later, on Melbourne's 3AW.
