= Allan Hird Sr. =

Australian rules footballer, coach, and executive

Allan Hird

Personal information
- Full name: Allan Thomas Hird
- Born: 11 August 1918; Costerfield, Victoria
- Died: 16 May 2007 (aged 88); Sunbury, Victoria
- Original team: Williamstown

Playing career^{1}
Years	Club	Games (Goals)
1938–1939	Hawthorn	14 (12)
1940–1945	Essendon	102 (2)
1946–1947	St Kilda	38 (5)
Total		154 (19)

Coaching career
Years	Club	Games (W–L–D)
1946–1947	St Kilda	38 (5–32–1)
- ^{1} Playing statistics correct to the end of 1947.

Allan Thomas Hird Sr. (11 August 1918 – 16 May 2007) was an Australian rules football player, coach and executive in the Victorian Football League (now AFL).

== VFL playing career ==
Recruited from Williamstown, Hird joined the Hawthorn Football Club where he made his debut in 1938. He played 14 games for the club before moving to Essendon in 1940. It was at the Bombers he enjoyed his greatest success, playing 102 games from 1940 to 1945 as a pacy flanker, and being a part of the 1942 premiership team.

== VFL coaching career ==
Hird later spent two years with the St Kilda Football Club as captain-coach, leaving at the end of 1947. After returning to Essendon, Hird was captain-coach of the Essendon Seconds (Reserves) team from 1948 to 1952 and non-playing coach from 1953 to 1954, before retiring from all forms of playing. In his seven years as captain-coach of the Seconds, the team won the premiership twice, in 1950 and 1952 (Hird's last match), and was runner-up three times.

All but one of the 20 players, Allan Taylor, in Hird's 1952 Essendon Seconds Premiership team that defeated Collingwood Seconds 7.14 (56) to 4.5 (29) had either already played for the Essendon Firsts or would go on to do so in the future. Excluding the senior games that some, such as Hird, had already played (or would go on to play) with other VFL clubs, the members of the Essendon 1952 Seconds Premiership Team played an aggregate total of 1072 senior games for Essendon Firsts.

		Essendon	
Backs	Alan Thaw	Jack Knowles	Doug Bigelow
H/Backs	Brian Paine	John Ramsay	Bob Taylor
Centre Line	Keith McIntosh	Hugh Morris	Alby Law
H/Forwards	Greg Sewell	Bill Snell	Ray Martini
Forwards	Brian Gilmore	Ken Reed	Stan Booth
Rucks/Rover	Allan Hird (c/c)	Geoff Leek	Allan Taylor
Reserves	Mal Pascoe	Ian Monks	

== Post-playing career ==
Hird joined Essendon's club committee in 1955–1958 and became treasurer for the 1959 and 1960 seasons. He became vice-president in 1965, before holding the position as president of the club from 1969 to 1975.

The Allan T. Hird Stand was named in his honour at Windy Hill in Essendon, and he was an inaugural inductee into the club's Hall of Fame in 1996, given Legend status the same year.

Hird was the father of Allan Hird Jr., who also had a brief playing career with Essendon. His grandson is former Essendon captain and coach James Hird.
