= Mal Pascoe =

Australian rules footballer and coach (1933–2020)

Personal information
- Full name: Malcolm Lawrence Pascoe
- Born: 31 March 1933
- Died: 24 August 2020 (aged 87)
- Original team: Essendon under-19s
- Height: 180 cm (5 ft 11 in)
- Weight: 85 kg (187 lb)
- Position: Ruck-rover

Playing career^{1}
Years	Club	Games (Goals)
1953–1958	Essendon	94 (41)
1959–1966	Hobart	177 (341)

Coaching career
Years	Club	Games (W–L–D)
1959–1965	Hobart	147 (83–62–2)
1978–1979	Hobart	40 (9–31–0)
- ^{1} Playing statistics correct to the end of 1966.

Career highlights
- TANFL leading goalkicker: 1959 (75 goals), 1960 (57 goals); TANFL premiership captain-coach: 1959, 1960, 1963; Tasmanian state premiership captain-coach: 1959; William Leitch Medallist: 1959; Selected in Hobart's official "Best Team (1947 to 2002)"

Malcolm Lawrence Pascoe (31 March 1933 – 24 August 2020) was an Australian rules footballer and coach. He played 94 senior Victorian Football League (VFL) games for the Essendon Football Club from 1953 to 1958, and played 177 senior Tasmanian Australian National Football League (TANFL) games for the Hobart Football Club from 1959 to 1966. He was captain-coach of Hobart from 1959 to 1965, and non-playing coach of Hobart from 1978 to 1979.

== Family ==
Malcolm Lawrence Pascoe was born on 31 March 1933. He married Kay Alison Forbes on 8 October 1955. In 1978 he married Elaine Burrows, with whom he had a daughter, Samantha.

== Early career at Essendon ==
Joining Essendon at age 15, Pascoe steadily made his way through the Essendon thirds (under-19s), and the seconds (reserves), from 1949 until his first senior match in 1953.

He was one of the highly talented 1952 Essendon seconds premiership team that beat Collingwood seconds 7.14 (56) to 4.5 (29).

All but one of the premiership team's 20 players, Allan Taylor, had either already played for the Essendon firsts or would go on to do so in the future: excluding the senior games that some had already played (or would go on to play) with other VFL clubs, the members of the Essendon 1952 seconds premiership team played an aggregate total of 1072 senior games for Essendon firsts. The premiership team was:

		Essendon	
Backs	Alan Thaw	Jack Knowles	Doug Bigelow
H/Backs	Brian Paine	John Ramsay	Bob Taylor
Centre Line	Keith McIntosh	Hugh Morris	Alby Law
H/Forwards	Greg Sewell	Bill Snell	Ray Martini
Forwards	Brian Gilmore	Ken Reed	Stan Booth
Rucks/rover	Allan Hird (c/c)	Geoff Leek	Allan Taylor
Reserves	Mal Pascoe^{‡}	Ian Monks	

‡ Mal Pacoe replaced Brian Paine in the last quarter.

== Senior career at Essendon ==
He played mainly as a ruck-rover resting on the backline, sharing the duties with Hugh Mitchell. He was a strong overhead mark, a fearless defender, and widely acknowledged as one of the best drop kicks in the VFL.

He made his senior debut in Round 9 of the 1953 season (20 June 1953), at full-back — in place of Roy McConnell, who had been moved to centre half-back to replace the injured Jack Jones — against Hawthorn at Glenferrie Oval. Essendon won 12.15 (87) to Hawthorn’s 9.10 (64). Pascoe played well enough be selected, again, the next week, although on the half-back flank (Jones had returned to centre-half back, and McConnell to full-back) along with Norm McDonald. He played in all of the remaining matches of the 1953 season.

=== Record ===
His senior record with Essendon is impressive:

- 1953: 9 games (including the losing First Semi-Final team).
  - He also played (at full-back) in the winning Seconds' Semi-Final team that beat Richmond, 13.4 (82) to 10.13 (73), on 12 September 1953. and in the team that lost to Carlton (11.7 (73) to 15.7 (79)) in the Seconds' Grand-Final.
- 1954: 17 games.
- 1955: 17 games, 27 goals (including losing First Semi-Final team).
- 1956: 17 games, 13 goals (plus 1 night game).
- 1957: 19 games, 4 goals (including losing Grand Final team) (plus 1 night game, 3 goals)
- 1958: 18 games, 18 goals (plus 2 night games, 5 goals).

=== Coach application ===
He unsuccessfully applied for Essendon's vacant senior coaching position in 1971; the position was awarded to John Birt.

== Hobart ==
Pascoe left Essendon at the end of 1958, and was appointed coach of Hobart Football Club in the Tasmanian Australian National Football League (TANFL) in 1959. He was the club's "second pick": ex-Geelong player Bob Davis had been appointed as the club's coach, but decided not to leave Victoria at the last moment, and suggested Pascoe as a suitable replacement.

The extent of Essendon's loss is reflected in the fact that, in his first year in Tasmania:

- His team won the TANFL premiership, with Pascoe as captain-coach, beating New Norfolk 9.14 (68) to 2.9 (27).
- His premiership team won the Tasmanian State Grand Final, with Pascoe as captain-coach, beating North Western Football Union (NWFU) premiers Burnie 14.11 (95) to 9.14 (68).
- He played interstate football for Tasmania.
- Having switched for the back-line to the forward-line, he was the leading goal-kicker in the TFL (75 goals).
- He was voted the league's best and fairest for 1959 and was awarded the William Leitch Medal.

He played for Hobart from 1959 to 1966 — from 1959 to 1965 as a captain-coach (relinquishing the coaching position to John Watts in 1966) — and, later, was the non-paying coach from 1978 to 1979. The team, under his coaching, won the TANFL premierships in 1959, 1960, and 1963.

In all, he played 177 senior games for Hobart Football Club, scoring 341 goals, starring in his last game, Hobart's 1966 Grand Final one-point win over Glenorchy 10.14 (74) to 11.7 (73).

=== Best Team (1947 to 2002) ===
In 2002, he was chosen as first ruck in Hobart's official "Best Team (1947 to 2002)".

== Tasmanian Football Hall of Fame ==
On 3 July 2015, Mal Pascoe was inducted into the Tasmanian Football Hall of Fame.

== Death ==
He died in Tasmania on 24 August 2020, aged 87.
