= John Ramsay (Australian footballer) =

Australian rules footballer

Personal information
- Full name: John Thomas Ramsay
- Born: 18 February 1930; Gisborne, Victoria
- Died: 13 November 1983 (aged 53); Glenroy, Victoria
- Original team: North Essendon Methodists
- Height: 188 cm (6 ft 2 in)
- Weight: 87 kg (192 lb)
- Position: Follower

Playing career^{1}
Years	Club	Games (Goals)
1952	Essendon	2 (0)
1954–1959	Williamstown (VFA)	42 (8)
- ^{1} Playing statistics correct to the end of 1959.

Career highlights
- VFA Grand Final winner 1954, 1958

John Thomas Ramsay (18 February 1930 – 13 November 1983) was an Australian rules footballer who played with Essendon in the Victorian Football League (VFL).

== Football ==
=== Essendon (VFL) ===
He won a reserves premiership with Essendon in 1950; and, in 1952, he played at centre half-back, and was one of the best on the ground, in the highly talented Essendon Seconds Premiership team that beat Collingwood Seconds 7.14 (56) to 4.5 (29):

		Essendon	
Backs	Alan Thaw	Jack Knowles	Doug Bigelow
H/Backs	Brian Paine	John Ramsay	Bob Taylor
Centre Line	Keith McIntosh	Hugh Morris	Alby Law
H/Forwards	Greg Sewell	Bill Snell	Ray Martini
Forwards	Brian Gilmore	Ken Reed	Stan Booth
Rucks/Rover	Allan Hird (c/c)	Geoff Leek	Allan Taylor
Reserves	Mal Pascoe	Ian Monks	

Excluding the senior games that some had already played (or would go on to play) with other VFL clubs, the members of the Essendon 1952 Seconds Premiership Team played an aggregate total of 1072 senior games for Essendon Firsts.

=== Williamstown (VFA) ===
Ramsay later played for Williamstown in the Victorian Football Association, with whom he won four premierships.
