= Geoff Leek =

Australian rules footballer and broadcaster

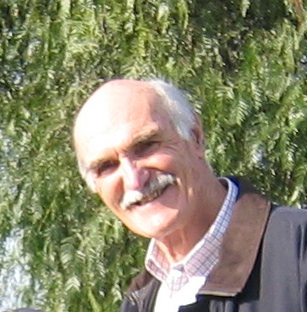

Personal information
- Born: 18 February 1932
- Died: 21 February 2008 (aged 76); East Malvern
- Original team: Preston Boys Club
- Debut: 7 July 1951, Essendon vs. Richmond, at Windy Hill, Essendon
- Height: 194 cm (6 ft 4 in)
- Weight: 96 kg (212 lb)

Playing career^{1}
Years	Club	Games (Goals)
1951–1962	Essendon	191 (98)
- ^{1} Playing statistics correct to the end of 1962.

Geoff Leek (18 February 1932 – 21 February 2008) was an Australian rules footballer who played with Essendon in the VFL from 1951 to 1962.

== First senior match ==
Recruited from the Preston Boys Club (he had been released by Collingwood to whom he was residentially bound), he played in Essendon's Thirds (under-19s), and played something like four seasons with the Seconds before becoming a regular seniors player in 1953.

He was selected as a reserve for his first senior game for Essendon. It was against Richmond at Windy Hill on Saturday 7 July 1951. Essendon won by four points: 10.14 (74) to Richmond's 10.10 (70).

He took a long time to develop, playing only six senior matches in 1951, and five in 1952.

He played in the highly talented 1952 Essendon Seconds Premiership team that beat Collingwood Seconds 7.14 (56) to 4.5 (29). All but one of the premiership team's 20 players had either already played for the Essendon Firsts or would go on to do so in the future; the team was:

		Essendon	
Backs	Alan Thaw	Jack Knowles	Doug Bigelow
H/Backs	Brian Paine	John Ramsay	Bob Taylor
Centre Line	Keith McIntosh	Hugh Morris	Alby Law
H/Forwards	Greg Sewell	Bill Snell	Ray Martini
Forwards	Brian Gilmore	Ken Reed	Stan Booth
Rucks/Rover	Allan Hird (c/c)	Geoff Leek	Allan Taylor
Reserves	Mal Pascoe	Ian Monks	

Excluding the senior games that some had already played (or would go on to play) with other VFL clubs, the members of the Essendon 1952 Seconds Premiership Team played an aggregate total of 1072 senior games for Essendon Firsts.

== Career ==
He eventually went on to play 191 senior games for Essendon (including 70 consecutive games between 1956 and 1960), and score 98 goals in his senior career.

He regularly played in the Essendon senior sides in the 1950s and was known for a left-foot kick.

Towards the end of his career, he learned how to cooperate with ruck-rover Hugh Mitchell, and as he took over the responsibilities of the first ruck from John Gill, the club grew its influence.

He was selected in the Victorian representative team that played four matches in the Australian National Football Council's (ANFC) Centenary Carnival held in Melbourne in 1958.

== VFL's tallest player ==
In May 1952, as part of its promotion of the Burt Lancaster movie Ten Tall Men, the management of the Melbourne cinema The State Theatre on the corner of Flinders Street and Russell Street (now known as the Forum Theatre) measured the height of the ten tallest VFL players.

Geoff Leek was officially declared to be the tallest: at 6'4½" he was half an inch taller than the next 8 tallest players, Denis Cordner of Melbourne, Kevin Easton of North Melbourne, John Gill of Essendon, Brian Gilmore of Footscray, Jack "Chooka" Howell of Carlton, Tom H. McLean of Melbourne, Bill McMaster of Geelong, and George Swarbrick of Geelong (all of whom were 6'4"), and an inch taller than Colin Thornton of North Melbourne, who was 6'3½".

Renowned for his courage and dedication as a player, his fine character as a man, and his overall good sportsmanship, he was known throughout the football world as "the gentle giant".

== 1962 Grand Final ==
Having played in two losing grand finals (1957 Grand Final Team and 1959 Grand Final Team) Leek was finally in a winning team, the 1962 VFL Grand Final Team against Carlton. This was his last game for Essendon. He completely nullified Carlton's John Nicholls, and paved the way for Essendon's victory.

He almost didn't play at all due to an ankle injury – he was in doubt even half an hour before the match – and he took to the field having had a series of pain killing injections. According to Maplestone (1996, p. 193):

[Essendon] supporters were given another scare when top ruckman Geoff Leek injured his left ankle [Leek was naturally a left-foot kick] towards the end of training on the Thursday night before the big game.
In fact it was only thirty minutes before the game that it was decided that Leek could take his place in the team. After an examination the night before, the club doctor still believed that Leek would not be fit enough to play. And he was vital to the Dons' chances. It was only after a two-mile walk on the morning of the game that it seemed that he would be able to play. But, even then he was dosed up with pain killing injections before taking the field.

In 2008, team-mate Barry Capuano revealed the full story:

"On the Thursday night at training prior to the 1962 Grand Final, which was to be Geoff's last game, he badly twisted his ankle and was considered very doubtful to play", Capuano recalled.

The selectors at the time gave him every opportunity of playing on the basis that he must pass a fitness test prior to the game. Geoff had pain killing injections in his ankle and was already dressed in his playing gear, prior to the test, just before the game. The test was to kick a medicine ball under the watchful eyes of the selectors, and Geoff grimaced somewhat after his first timid kick, and was requested to kick the ball harder. The second kick was somewhat harder but still not to the satisfaction of the selectors, and he was requested to kick the ball as hard as possible otherwise he was out of the side.

Geoff gave the ball a solid kick and was then declared fit to play. The selectors were never aware that Geoff was kicking with his non-injured leg! He played a great game and was amongst the best players."

== Essendon Football Club ==
Leek surprised all at Essendon when he announced his retirement prior to the 1963 season.

He had served on the Essendon Football Club's committee in 1957; and was made a Life Member in 1960.

He was the permanent vice-captain of the senior team from 1957 to 1962, and was acting captain on thirteen occasions (four in 1957, two in 1959, one in 1960, five in 1961, and one in 1962).

== Post-football media ==
He was a highly respected radio broadcaster over many years, as well as being a panelist on Channel 9's Sunday Football Show (1963–1972), and on the ABC in a similar role (1973–1987). He also served as a member of the VFL Complaints Committee.

== Death ==
He died suddenly, at home, on Wednesday 21 February 2008, having just celebrated his 76th birthday on the preceding Monday (18 February 2008).
