= McCashney =

McCashney is a surname. Notable people with the surname include:

- Ben McCashney (born 1988), Australian racing driver
- Frank McCashney (born 1890), Australian rules footballer who played for the Richmond Football Club
- Jim McCashney (born 1900), Australian rules footballer who played for the Hawthorn Football Club
- John McCashney (footballer born 1884), Australian rules footballer who played for the South Melbourne Football Club
- John McCashney (footballer born 1932), Australian rules footballer who played for the Hawthorn Football Club
