= Daylesford Football Club =

Australian rules football and netball club

Daylesford FNC Inc.

Names
- Full name: Daylesford Football Netball Club
- Nickname: Bulldogs

Club details
- Founded: 1877; 149 years ago
- Colours: blue white red
- Competition: Central Highlands Football League
- Premierships: 9 (1911, 1922, 1927, 1961, 2007, 2009, 2012, 2024, 2026)
- Ground: Victoria Park, Daylesford

Uniforms
Home

Other information
- Official website: daylesfordbulldogs.com.au

Daylesford Football Netball Club, nicknamed the Bulldogs, is an Australian rules football and netball club based in the Victorian town of Daylesford. The club plays in the Central Highlands Football League.

The club was formerly known as the Daylesford "Demons" until 2006, when they joined the Central Highlands Football League.

== History ==
In September, 1877, Daylesford played an Australian Rules Football match against Castlemaine, which resulted in a draw.

In 1914, the club's colours were blue and white.

In 1926, J P Crockett was elected as President of the Daylesford FC for the 17th successive year. In 1938, J P Crockett was elected as club president.

Daylesford player, Reg Cole, won the club's 1949 best and fairest award, which was apparently the 14th best and fairest award he had won across 23 seasons of Australian Rules Football and seven different country leagues. Cole was previously captain-coach of Daylesford in 1935.

In 1950, Daylesford were minor premiers, with Maldon taking out the major Castlemaine Football League premiership.

The club competed in the Ballarat Football League from 1952 to 2005, winning one senior football premiership in 1961, with the help of former South Melbourne player, Jim Gull who kicked a record 159 goals for the Demons that season.

In 2006, Dayleford made the decision to move across to the Central Highlands Football League.

Daylesford's senior football side has had a successful run since joining the Central Highlands Football League, contesting six consecutive grand finals between 2007 and 2012, for three premiership wins in 2007, 2009 and 2012.

Football Club Timeline

- 1877 - 1890: Club active playing friendly matches against other local towns.
- 1891 - 1894: Clunes, Allendale & Daylesford Football Association (Murray Cup)
- 1895 - 1899: Club active, but no competition football.
- 1900 - 1905: Club active, but not sure if Daylesford competed in any football competitions.
- 1906 - Daylesford Football Association
- 1907 - 1909: Creswick Football Association
- 1910 - Daylesford Hepburn Football Association
- 1911 - Kyneton & District Football Association
- 1912 - 1913: Woodend & District Football Association
- 1914 - Castlemaine & District Football League
- 1915 - 1919: Club in recess due to World War One
- 1920 - 1921: Castlemaine & District Football League
- 1922 - Woodend Football League
- 1923 - 1925: Castlemaine & District Football League
- 1926 - 1928: Kyneton District Football League
- 1929 - 1931: Ballarat Football League
- 1932 - Midland Football League: (Minor Premiers), but club withdrew from the finals.
- 1933 - 1938: Clunes Football League
- 1939 - Clunes Football League: Club withdrew from the league in May 1939, due to a shortage of players.
- 1940 - 1945: Club in recess, due to World War Two
- 1946 - 1951: Castlemaine Football League
- 1952 - 2005: Ballarat Football League
- 2006 - 2024: Central Highlands Football League

== Football Premierships ==
Seniors

- Kyneton & District Football Association
  - 1911 - Daylesford: 1.17 - 23 defeated Trentham: 2.9 - 21
- Woodend & District Football Association
  - 1922 - Daylesford: 9.10 - 64 d Kyneton: 9.6 - 60
- Kyneton & District Football League
  - 1927 - Daylesford: 4.8 - 32 defeated (Kyneton) Collegians: 4.4 - 28
- Ballarat Football League
  - 1961 - Daylesford: 13.10 - 88 d Maryborough: 8.13 - 61 (Jim Gull - 7 goals)
- Central Highlands Football League
  - 2007 - Daylesford: 10.12 - 72 d Waubra: 9.10 - 64
  - 2009 - Daylesford:10.12 - 72 d 9.13 - 67
  - 2012 - Daylesford: 12.10 - 82 d Buninyong: 11.7 - 73
  - 2024 Daylesford: 7.8 - 50 d Bungareee 3.5 - 23
  - 2026 Daylesford 124 d Dunnstown 77

Reserves

?

== Football Runners Up ==
Senior Football

- Creswick Football Association
  - 1909
- Woodend & District Football Association
  - 1912 - Collegians (Kyneton): 3.9 - 27 d Daylesford: 3.5 - 23
  - 1913 - Trentham: 4.2 - 26 d Daylesford: 3.4 - 22
- Castlemaine Football League
  - 1914 - Maldon: 17.13 - 115 d Daylesford: 5.6 - 36
- Kyneton District Football league
  - 1926 - Collegians (Kyneton): 11.9 - 75 d Daylesford: 7.15 - 57
- Clunes Football League
  - 1935 - Newlyn: 15.16 - 106 d Daylesford: 5.4 - 34
- Ballarat Football League
  - 1960 - Maryborough: defeated Daylesford: by 10 points.
- Central Highlands Football League
  - 2008 - Hepburn: 18.3 - 111 d Daylesford: 9.13 - 67
  - 2010 - Hepburn: 18.11 - 119 d Daylesford: 8.3 - 51
  - 2011 - Waebra: 10.9 - 69 d Daylesford: 6.8 - 44

== League Best and Fairest Winners ==
Senior Football

- Clunes Football League
  - 1937 - Reg Cole
  - 1938 - H Dwan
- Ballarat Football League - Henderson Medal
  - 1954 - Vic Bodsworth
  - 1966 - Charlie Marendaz
  - 1983 - John Schultz
  - 1985 - Terry Love
  - 1989 - Terry Hourigan
  - 1996 - Tim Beacham
  - 2001 & 2002 - Scott Winduss
- Central Highlands Football League - Geoff Taylor Medal
  - 2006 & 2007 - Luke Adams

== League Goal Kicking Winners ==
Senior Football

- Ballarat Football League
  - 1931 - Joe Plummer: 77 goals
  - 1958 - Jim Gull
  - 1959 - Jim Gull
  - 1960 - Jim Gull
  - 1961 - Jim Gull: 159
  - 1962 - Jim Gull
  - 1963 - Jim Gull
  - 1964 - Jim Gull
  - 1968 - Jim Gull
  - 1984 - Terry Phillipe: 100 +
  - 1985 - Terry Phillipe: 100 +
- Jim Gull kicked 889 goals for Daylesford FC in the Ballarat Football League.

== VFL/AFL players ==
The following footballers played with Daylesford, prior to playing senior football in the VFL/AFL, and / or drafted, with the year indicating their VFL/AFL debut.

- 1906 - Ray Sartori - Essendon
- 1912 - Carl Willis - University
- 1930 - Dave Coutts - Essendon
- 1936 - Eric Coutts - Essendon
- 1938 - Arthur Sanger - Carlton
- 1951 - Jack Gervasoni - Fitzroy,
- 1956 - Noel Teasdale - North Melbourne
- 1959 - Ralph Edwards - Footscray
- 1959 - Norm McKenzie - South Melbourne
- 1961 - Merv Hobbs - Footscray
- 1978 - Ian Sartori - St Kilda, Richmond
- 1984 - John W. Schultz - St Kilda
- 1985 - Andrew Manning - St Kilda, Essendon
- 1987 - Peter Sartori - Carlton
- 1990 - Chris Grant - Western Bulldogs
- 1991 - Jamie Grant - Western Bulldogs
- 2011 - Josh Cowan - Geelong

The following footballers played senior VFL / AFL football prior to playing and / or coaching with Daylesford with the year indicating their first season at DFNC.

- 1928 - Norm Collins - Carlton
- 1931 - Ray Martin - Richmond
- 1954 - Vic Bodsworth - Footscray
- 1966 - Ian Burt - Essendon
- 1966 - Jack Greenwood - Footscray
- 1968 - Brian Donohue - Essendon
- 1974 - Sandy Talbot - Essendon
- 1984 - Bruce Gonsalves - Collingwood
- 1984 - Terry Philippe - Collingwood

== Daylesford District Football Association ==
The Daylesford District Football Association was formed in April, 1914 from the following football clubs - Bullarto, Musk Vale, Star Rovers (Daylesford) and Wombat Hill.

The Association ran for only two years just prior to World War One in 1914 and 1915, with what appears to be long break from 1916 until reforming in 1930.

In August 1946, Port Melbourne Football Association, 14.3 - 87 defeated Daylesford DFA, 7.9 - 51.

| | DDFA - Competition Teams | |
| Team | Years in competition | Comments / Fate |
|---|---|---|
| Bullarto | 1914-15, 1930-31 | |
| Creswick | 1934 | |
| Daylesford 2nds | 1934 | |
| Daylesford Fire Brigade | 1915, 1932 | |
| Daylesford United | 1933-37 | |
| Eganstown | 1931-33 | |
| Glenlyon | 1932-39 | |
| Hepburn | 1930-39 | |
| Korweinguboora | 1930, 1939 | |
| Loddon Valley | 1932-37 | |
| Lyonville | 1939 | |
| Militia | 1938-39 | |
| Musk Vale | 1914-15 | |
| Springmount | 1935-36 | |
| Textile | 1938-39 | |
| Trentham | 1933-36 | |
| Victoria Park | 1931-32 | |
| Woollen Mills | 1930-31 | |
| Wombat Hill | 1914-15 | |
| Star Rovers | 1914, 1930-31 | |

| | Daylesford DFA - Grand Final Scores | | | | | |
| Year | Premiers | Score | Runner up | Score | Venue | Gate / Comments |
Daylesford District FA
| 1914 | Bullarto | 4.9 - 33 | Musk Vale | 1.1 - 7 | Bullarto | |
| 1915 | Bullarto | 2.7 - 19 | Wombat Hill | 0.0 - 0 | Victoria Park | |
| 1916-29 | | | | | | DDFA in recess ? |
| 1930 | Hepburn ? | | | | | |
| 1931 | Victoria Park | 3.2 - 20 | Hepburn | 2.7 - 19 | | |
| 1932 | Loddon Valley | 12.12 - 84 | Hepburn | 5.7 - 37 | | |
| 1933 | Trentham | 9.7 - 61 | Loddon Valley | 2.2 - 14 | | |
| 1934 | Hepburn | 5.6 - 36 | Loddon Valley | 5.5 - 35 | | 1st G Final Hepburn Premiers: |
| | Loddon Valley | led by 2 goals | Hepburn | | | 2nd Final |
| 1935 | Daylesford United | 6.11 - 47 | Hepburn | 4.14 - 38 | | |
| 1936 | Glenlyon | defeated | Hepburn | | | |
| 1937 | Hepburn | 7.11 - 53 | Glenlyon | 6.10 - 46 | | |
| 1938 | Hepburn | 11.15 - 81 | Glenlyon | 7.3 - 45 | | |
| 1939 | Hepburn | 12.10 - 82 | Korweinguboora | 8.7 - 55 | | |

== Book ==
- History of Football in the Ballarat District by John Stoward - ISBN 978-0-9805929-0-0
