= John McCashney =

John McCashney may refer to:

- John McCashney (footballer, born 1884) (1884–1952), Australian rules footballer with South Melbourne
- John McCashney (footballer, born 1932) (1932–2023), Australian rules footballer with Hawthorn
