= Eric Little =

Eric Little may refer to:

- Eric Little (footballer), Australian rules footballer
- Eric D. Little, United States Army brigadier general
- Eric K. Little, United States Army major general
