= Marendaz =

Marendaz may refer to:

- Charlie Marendaz, Australian footballer
- Marendaz Special, motor cars
- Marendaz Trainer, a type of aircraft
