= Stewart Gull =

Stewart Gull may refer to:

- Stewart Gull, Detective Chief Superintendent in charge of the Ipswich 2006 serial murders investigation
- Stewart Gull (footballer), former Australian rules footballer in the Victorian Football League
