= 1952 VFL season =

56th season of the Victorian Football League (VFL)

1952 VFL premiership season
- Teams: 12
- Premiers: Geelong; 5th premiership
- Minor premiers: Geelong; 7th minor premiership
- Brownlow Medallist: Bill Hutchison (Essendon); Roy Wright (Richmond)
- John Coleman (Essendon)
- Matches played: 118
- Highest: 82,890

The 1952 VFL season was the 56th season of the Victorian Football League (VFL), the highest level senior Australian rules football competition in Victoria. The season featured twelve clubs, ran from 19 April until 27 September, and comprised a 19-game home-and-away season followed by a finals series featuring the top four clubs.

The premiership was won by the Geelong Football Club for the fifth time and second time consecutively. Geelong defeated Collingwood by 46 points in the 1952 VFL Grand Final, as part of a 23-game winning streak spanning the 1952 and 1953 seasons which stands as the longest in league history.

== Background ==
In 1952, the VFL competition consisted of twelve teams of 18 on-the-field players each, plus two substitute players, known as the 19th man and the 20th man. A player could be substituted for any reason; however, once substituted, a player could not return to the field of play under any circumstances.

Teams played each other in a home-and-away season of 19 rounds.

There was an extra round (round 8), in addition to 1951's 18 rounds. Promoted as a "National Day Round", it was held on the Saturday (14 June) of the Queen's Birthday weekend and saw all clubs play a match for premiership points at country or interstate locations, while the Victorian State side played against the West Australian State side at Melbourne Cricket Ground.

The season was constructed as follows: in rounds 1 to 7 and 9 to 12 the teams played each other. Round 8, the "National Day Round", was the reverse of round 11 (and the designated round 8 "home team" was the reverse of that in round 11). Rounds 13 to 19 were the "home-and-away reverse" of rounds 1 to 7.

Once the 19 round home-and-away season had finished, the 1952 VFL Premiers were determined by the specific format and conventions of the Page–McIntyre system.

== Home-and-away season ==
=== Round 1 ===
Home team	Home team score	Away team	Away team score	Venue	Crowd	Date
Fitzroy	5.15 (45)	Richmond	7.12 (54)	Brunswick Street Oval	20,500	19 April 1952
South Melbourne	11.16 (82)	St Kilda	8.26 (74)	Lake Oval	18,000	19 April 1952
Melbourne	14.13 (97)	Geelong	15.13 (103)	MCG	25,000	19 April 1952
Footscray	6.10 (46)	Essendon	6.5 (41)	Western Oval	24,000	19 April 1952
Hawthorn	2.8 (20)	Collingwood	15.16 (106)	Glenferrie Oval	14,000	19 April 1952
North Melbourne	8.19 (67)	Carlton	13.12 (90)	Arden Street Oval	22,000	19 April 1952

=== Round 2 ===
Home team	Home team score	Away team	Away team score	Venue	Crowd	Date
Essendon	14.12 (96)	North Melbourne	13.11 (89)	Windy Hill	21,000	26 April 1952
Collingwood	13.17 (95)	Fitzroy	8.14 (62)	Victoria Park	26,000	26 April 1952
Carlton	12.12 (84)	South Melbourne	13.11 (89)	Princes Park	31,500	26 April 1952
St Kilda	13.11 (89)	Melbourne	12.19 (91)	Junction Oval	19,000	26 April 1952
Richmond	12.10 (82)	Hawthorn	8.14 (62)	Punt Road Oval	13,000	26 April 1952
Geelong	10.4 (64)	Footscray	7.15 (57)	Kardinia Park	30,000	26 April 1952

=== Round 3 ===
Home team	Home team score	Away team	Away team score	Venue	Crowd	Date
Geelong	14.15 (99)	St Kilda	5.4 (34)	Kardinia Park	20,500	3 May 1952
Collingwood	9.21 (75)	Essendon	7.9 (51)	Victoria Park	34,000	3 May 1952
Carlton	10.12 (72)	Fitzroy	13.14 (92)	Princes Park	25,500	3 May 1952
South Melbourne	14.17 (101)	Richmond	12.9 (81)	Lake Oval	28,500	3 May 1952
Melbourne	8.12 (60)	Hawthorn	10.14 (74)	MCG	13,500	3 May 1952
North Melbourne	11.11 (77)	Footscray	10.6 (66)	Arden Street Oval	20,000	3 May 1952

=== Round 4 ===
Home team	Home team score	Away team	Away team score	Venue	Crowd	Date
Hawthorn	11.3 (69)	South Melbourne	8.12 (60)	Glenferrie Oval	15,000	10 May 1952
Footscray	6.16 (52)	Melbourne	10.16 (76)	Western Oval	20,000	10 May 1952
Fitzroy	6.15 (51)	Geelong	14.16 (100)	Brunswick Street Oval	19,500	10 May 1952
Richmond	18.13 (121)	North Melbourne	16.15 (111)	Punt Road Oval	24,000	10 May 1952
St Kilda	8.16 (64)	Collingwood	12.12 (84)	Junction Oval	19,500	10 May 1952
Essendon	13.9 (87)	Carlton	13.16 (94)	Windy Hill	28,000	10 May 1952

=== Round 5 ===
Home team	Home team score	Away team	Away team score	Venue	Crowd	Date
Melbourne	8.9 (57)	South Melbourne	10.11 (71)	MCG	27,000	17 May 1952
Geelong	11.16 (82)	North Melbourne	6.10 (46)	Kardinia Park	20,000	17 May 1952
Footscray	9.6 (60)	Richmond	5.6 (36)	Western Oval	22,500	17 May 1952
Fitzroy	6.6 (42)	Hawthorn	5.11 (41)	Brunswick Street Oval	9,500	17 May 1952
St Kilda	11.10 (76)	Essendon	18.8 (116)	Junction Oval	17,500	17 May 1952
Collingwood	15.16 (106)	Carlton	7.14 (56)	Victoria Park	36,000	17 May 1952

=== Round 6 ===
Home team	Home team score	Away team	Away team score	Venue	Crowd	Date
Collingwood	12.19 (91)	Footscray	4.5 (29)	Victoria Park	20,500	31 May 1952
Carlton	14.10 (94)	St Kilda	10.13 (73)	Princes Park	12,500	31 May 1952
North Melbourne	6.13 (49)	Melbourne	9.9 (63)	Arden Street Oval	11,000	31 May 1952
Richmond	8.7 (55)	Geelong	11.13 (79)	Punt Road Oval	25,000	31 May 1952
South Melbourne	14.12 (96)	Fitzroy	9.11 (65)	Lake Oval	15,000	31 May 1952
Hawthorn	5.14 (44)	Essendon	15.8 (98)	Glenferrie Oval	14,000	31 May 1952

=== Round 7 ===
Home team	Home team score	Away team	Away team score	Venue	Crowd	Date
Fitzroy	8.15 (63)	St Kilda	3.6 (24)	Brunswick Street Oval	10,300	7 June 1952
North Melbourne	12.8 (80)	Hawthorn	7.8 (50)	Arden Street Oval	11,000	7 June 1952
Melbourne	12.10 (82)	Collingwood	6.14 (50)	MCG	58,543	7 June 1952
Essendon	7.18 (60)	Richmond	10.9 (69)	Windy Hill	29,000	9 June 1952
Carlton	18.12 (120)	Geelong	13.15 (93)	Princes Park	37,500	9 June 1952
South Melbourne	16.14 (110)	Footscray	11.13 (79)	Lake Oval	26,000	9 June 1952

=== Round 8 (National Day Round) ===
Home team	Home team score	Away team	Away team score	Venue	Crowd	Date
Richmond	5.6 (36)	Collingwood	10.12 (72)	SCG	24,174	14 June 1952
Fitzroy	13.12 (90)	Melbourne	10.10 (70)	North Hobart Oval	18,387	14 June 1952
South Melbourne	18.10 (118)	North Melbourne	14.12 (96)	Albury Sports Ground	15,000	14 June 1952
Footscray	5.4 (34)	St Kilda	7.7 (49)	Yallourn Oval	3,500	14 June 1952
Carlton	17.15 (117)	Hawthorn	11.14 (80)	Euroa Oval	7,500	14 June 1952
Geelong	12.14 (86)	Essendon	23.17 (155)	Brisbane Exhibition Ground	28,000	16 June 1952

=== Round 9 ===
Home team	Home team score	Away team	Away team score	Venue	Crowd	Date
Geelong	7.13 (55)	South Melbourne	4.11 (35)	Kardinia Park	21,513	21 June 1952
Essendon	11.8 (74)	Melbourne	10.15 (75)	Windy Hill	16,000	21 June 1952
Collingwood	6.8 (44)	North Melbourne	8.12 (60)	Victoria Park	15,500	21 June 1952
St Kilda	5.11 (41)	Hawthorn	7.6 (48)	Junction Oval	7,500	21 June 1952
Footscray	6.9 (45)	Fitzroy	7.8 (50)	Western Oval	14,085	21 June 1952
Richmond	5.3 (33)	Carlton	5.9 (39)	Punt Road Oval	21,000	21 June 1952

=== Round 10 ===
Home team	Home team score	Away team	Away team score	Venue	Crowd	Date
North Melbourne	9.10 (64)	St Kilda	5.9 (39)	Arden Street Oval	7,000	28 June 1952
Melbourne	12.11 (83)	Richmond	6.10 (46)	MCG	23,557	28 June 1952
Carlton	15.22 (112)	Footscray	8.9 (57)	Princes Park	12,617	28 June 1952
Hawthorn	6.8 (44)	Geelong	10.10 (70)	Glenferrie Oval	7,500	28 June 1952
Fitzroy	13.12 (90)	Essendon	5.8 (38)	Brunswick Street Oval	12,500	28 June 1952
South Melbourne	9.10 (64)	Collingwood	12.13 (85)	Lake Oval	21,000	28 June 1952

=== Round 11 ===
Home team	Home team score	Away team	Away team score	Venue	Crowd	Date
North Melbourne	7.4 (46)	South Melbourne	10.17 (77)	Arden Street Oval	15,000	5 July 1952
Essendon	10.16 (76)	Geelong	11.10 (76)	Windy Hill	21,000	5 July 1952
Collingwood	10.19 (79)	Richmond	8.8 (56)	Victoria Park	21,911	5 July 1952
St Kilda	11.13 (79)	Footscray	12.13 (85)	Junction Oval	7,800	5 July 1952
Melbourne	11.7 (73)	Fitzroy	11.17 (83)	MCG	25,089	5 July 1952
Hawthorn	5.11 (41)	Carlton	9.24 (78)	Glenferrie Oval	11,000	5 July 1952

=== Round 12 ===
Home team	Home team score	Away team	Away team score	Venue	Crowd	Date
Richmond	10.17 (77)	St Kilda	6.8 (44)	Punt Road Oval	9,000	12 July 1952
Footscray	4.11 (35)	Hawthorn	9.4 (58)	Western Oval	12,218	12 July 1952
Fitzroy	13.11 (89)	North Melbourne	10.11 (71)	Brunswick Street Oval	10,500	12 July 1952
Carlton	6.14 (50)	Melbourne	6.14 (50)	Princes Park	24,839	12 July 1952
South Melbourne	8.12 (60)	Essendon	9.15 (69)	Lake Oval	27,000	12 July 1952
Geelong	9.8 (62)	Collingwood	4.9 (33)	Kardinia Park	36,145	12 July 1952

=== Round 13 ===
Home team	Home team score	Away team	Away team score	Venue	Crowd	Date
St Kilda	5.8 (38)	South Melbourne	6.8 (44)	Junction Oval	15,000	19 July 1952
Geelong	14.26 (110)	Melbourne	8.6 (54)	Kardinia Park	21,744	19 July 1952
Essendon	5.12 (42)	Footscray	7.15 (57)	Windy Hill	17,000	19 July 1952
Collingwood	12.15 (87)	Hawthorn	4.4 (28)	Victoria Park	12,643	19 July 1952
Carlton	5.23 (53)	North Melbourne	5.8 (38)	Princes Park	21,055	19 July 1952
Richmond	5.17 (47)	Fitzroy	11.10 (76)	Punt Road Oval	18,000	19 July 1952

=== Round 14 ===
Home team	Home team score	Away team	Away team score	Venue	Crowd	Date
Melbourne	11.12 (78)	St Kilda	8.10 (58)	MCG	14,045	26 July 1952
Hawthorn	8.14 (62)	Richmond	14.7 (91)	Glenferrie Oval	11,000	26 July 1952
Footscray	8.9 (57)	Geelong	9.12 (66)	Western Oval	22,759	26 July 1952
North Melbourne	7.11 (53)	Essendon	7.8 (50)	Arden Street Oval	15,000	26 July 1952
Fitzroy	5.6 (36)	Collingwood	4.11 (35)	Brunswick Street Oval	26,000	26 July 1952
South Melbourne	10.16 (76)	Carlton	10.16 (76)	Lake Oval	32,000	26 July 1952

=== Round 15 ===
Home team	Home team score	Away team	Away team score	Venue	Crowd	Date
Richmond	10.14 (74)	South Melbourne	12.14 (86)	Punt Road Oval	19,000	2 August 1952
Hawthorn	9.3 (57)	Melbourne	12.13 (85)	Glenferrie Oval	9,000	2 August 1952
Footscray	7.6 (48)	North Melbourne	8.9 (57)	Western Oval	14,760	2 August 1952
St Kilda	7.13 (55)	Geelong	9.16 (70)	Junction Oval	12,000	2 August 1952
Essendon	13.10 (88)	Collingwood	12.17 (89)	Windy Hill	21,000	2 August 1952
Fitzroy	5.15 (45)	Carlton	5.14 (44)	Brunswick Street Oval	29,000	2 August 1952

=== Round 16 ===
Home team	Home team score	Away team	Away team score	Venue	Crowd	Date
North Melbourne	14.10 (94)	Richmond	9.12 (66)	Arden Street Oval	12,000	9 August 1952
Collingwood	20.19 (139)	St Kilda	8.7 (55)	Victoria Park	14,100	9 August 1952
Carlton	11.16 (82)	Essendon	12.11 (83)	Princes Park	34,000	9 August 1952
South Melbourne	6.14 (50)	Hawthorn	9.14 (68)	Lake Oval	12,000	9 August 1952
Melbourne	15.17 (107)	Footscray	8.12 (60)	MCG	17,421	9 August 1952
Geelong	12.16 (88)	Fitzroy	5.10 (40)	Kardinia Park	31,314	9 August 1952

=== Round 17 ===
Home team	Home team score	Away team	Away team score	Venue	Crowd	Date
Essendon	22.15 (147)	St Kilda	7.9 (51)	Windy Hill	12,000	16 August 1952
Carlton	12.16 (88)	Collingwood	9.13 (67)	Princes Park	42,662	16 August 1952
South Melbourne	10.14 (74)	Melbourne	8.18 (66)	Lake Oval	24,000	16 August 1952
North Melbourne	11.9 (75)	Geelong	15.13 (103)	Arden Street Oval	15,000	16 August 1952
Richmond	13.11 (89)	Footscray	5.14 (44)	Punt Road Oval	11,000	16 August 1952
Hawthorn	7.6 (48)	Fitzroy	12.12 (84)	Glenferrie Oval	12,000	16 August 1952

=== Round 18 ===
Home team	Home team score	Away team	Away team score	Venue	Crowd	Date
Melbourne	11.16 (82)	North Melbourne	15.7 (97)	MCG	16,402	23 August 1952
Geelong	17.9 (111)	Richmond	10.7 (67)	Kardinia Park	21,318	23 August 1952
Fitzroy	9.10 (64)	South Melbourne	7.15 (57)	Brunswick Street Oval	29,000	23 August 1952
Essendon	20.12 (132)	Hawthorn	11.11 (77)	Windy Hill	12,000	23 August 1952
Footscray	6.14 (50)	Collingwood	14.15 (99)	Western Oval	20,584	23 August 1952
St Kilda	8.8 (56)	Carlton	13.14 (92)	Junction Oval	18,000	23 August 1952

=== Round 19 ===
Home team	Home team score	Away team	Away team score	Venue	Crowd	Date
Hawthorn	8.11 (59)	North Melbourne	12.10 (82)	Glenferrie Oval	6,000	30 August 1952
Footscray	13.13 (91)	South Melbourne	8.13 (61)	Western Oval	20,723	30 August 1952
Collingwood	13.14 (92)	Melbourne	10.11 (71)	Victoria Park	18,753	30 August 1952
St Kilda	10.12 (72)	Fitzroy	8.18 (66)	Junction Oval	9,000	30 August 1952
Richmond	15.11 (101)	Essendon	11.10 (76)	Punt Road Oval	28,000	30 August 1952
Geelong	10.17 (77)	Carlton	3.14 (32)	Kardinia Park	49,107	30 August 1952

== Ladder ==
(P)	Premiers
	Qualified for finals

#	Team	P	W	L	D	PF	PA	%	Pts
1	Geelong (P)	19	16	2	1	1594	1183	134.7	66
2	Collingwood	19	14	5	0	1528	1058	144.4	56
3	Fitzroy	19	13	6	0	1233	1170	105.4	52
4	Carlton	19	11	6	2	1473	1310	112.4	48
5	South Melbourne	19	11	7	1	1411	1337	105.5	46
6	Melbourne	19	9	9	1	1420	1379	103.0	38
7	North Melbourne	19	9	10	0	1352	1396	96.8	36
8	Essendon	19	8	10	1	1579	1390	113.6	34
9	Richmond	19	8	11	0	1281	1384	92.6	32
10	Footscray	19	5	14	0	1052	1364	77.1	20
11	Hawthorn	19	5	14	0	1030	1480	69.6	20
12	St Kilda	19	2	17	0	1071	1573	68.1	8

Rules for classification: 1. premiership points; 2. percentage; 3. points for
Average score: 70.3
Source: AFL Tables

== Finals series ==
=== Bracket ===
Semi-finals
1	Geelong	14.16 (100)
2	Collingwood	6.10 (46)
3	Fitzroy	10.9 (69)
4	Carlton	8.20 (68)

Preliminary final
2	Collingwood	11.15 (81)
3	Fitzroy	9.8 (62)

Grand final
1	Geelong	13.8 (86)
2	Collingwood	5.10 (40)

=== Semi-finals ===
Team	1 Qtr	2 Qtr	3 Qtr	Final
Fitzroy	2.1	6.3	8.5	10.9 (69)
Carlton	0.5	3.10	7.15	8.20 (68)
Attendance: 59,970

Team	1 Qtr	2 Qtr	3 Qtr	Final
Geelong	2.6	5.9	12.10	14.16 (100)
Collingwood	1.4	3.5	5.6	6.10 (46)
Attendance: 77,417

=== Preliminary final ===
Team	1 Qtr	2 Qtr	3 Qtr	Final
Collingwood	4.4	9.9	10.12	11.15 (81)
Fitzroy	4.2	4.3	9.5	9.8 (62)
Attendance: 54,046

=== Grand final ===
Team	1 Qtr	2 Qtr	3 Qtr	Final
Geelong	4.2	5.3	11.6	13.8 (86)
Collingwood	1.1	3.3	5.3	5.10 (40)
Attendance: 82,890

== Season notes ==
- Essendon winger Lance Mann won the 1952, 130-yard Stawell Gift in eleven and fourteen-sixteenths seconds, off a handicap of 7¼yards; his teammate, half-back flanker Norm McDonald, running off a handicap of 5 yards, came second.
- Bowing to pressure from its players and supporters, Fitzroy abandoned "The Gorillas" as its emblem. Originally intended to signify strength, tenacity, aggression, power, etc. the symbol had become somewhat devalued when opposition supporters started referring to the team as "The Apes". "The Lions" was not introduced until 1957; in the interim they were known as either "The Maroons" or "The Roys".
- In May 1952, as part of its promotion of the Burt Lancaster movie Ten Tall Men, the management of the Melbourne cinema The State Theatre on the corner of Flinders Street and Russell Street (now known as the Forum Theatre) measured the height of the ten tallest VFL players. Geoff Leek of Essendon was officially declared to be the tallest, at 6 ft 4 1/2 in (194.3 cm).
- As part of an effort by the Australian National Football Council to promote the game, a special round of VFL premiership matches was held in different cities around Australia on round 8, which was Queen's Birthday weekend: Brisbane, Sydney, Euroa, Yallourn, Albury and Hobart hosted matches. Wet weather across much of eastern Australia affected crowds at Yallourn and Sydney, and forced the postponement of the match at Brisbane from Saturday afternoon to Monday evening after the RNA feared the match would damage the rain-sodden turf; but matches not affected by rain drew huge crowds, including:
  - The crowd of 18,387 between Fitzroy and Melbourne in Hobart set a new record for the largest crowd ever to attend a football match in Tasmania, breaking the record which had been set at the 1947 Hobart Interstate Carnival.
  - The crowd of 15,000 between South Melbourne and North Melbourne in Albury set a new record for the largest football crowd in Albury's history.
  - The crowd of 28,000 between Geelong and Essendon at the postponed match in Brisbane was unable to be accommodated by the venue, and a further 2,000 spectators entered without paying after breaking through a perimeter fence.

The National Day Round was played in addition to the standard eighteen games, so that the people of Melbourne and Geelong would still have nine home matches. An interstate match between Victoria and Western Australia was played in Melbourne during that weekend. The endeavour was financed by the ANFC, which turned a small profit on the event after having insured the gate against rain.

- In the First Semi-Final, Carlton's high marking centreman Keith Warburton received a heavy knock to his abdomen early in the match, but thought little of it. Later that evening he collapsed at the Carlton Club dance. He was rushed to hospital where it was discovered that he was suffering from a severed artery leading to his bowel. He hovered near death for some days, requiring almost continuous transfusions of blood. It was said that his physical fitness was the only reason he survived the injury.
- In Round 10, in a match played in atrocious conditions at the Brunswick Street Oval, Fitzroy's champion full-back, Vic Chanter, held Essendon champion full-forward John Coleman goalless for the only time in his 98-game career.
- Overall, the season was the wettest season for more than 20 years. Many matches were played in deep sticky mud on grounds that were covered in sheets of water. Mud was ankle deep at the Brunswick Street Oval in Round 11. White balls were introduced in July to help players see the ball in all of the mud.
  - The overall bad weather and the atrocious condition of the grounds throughout the season, and the effect that had on the condition of the ball, especially in relation to hand-passing, marking and kicking, as well as the physical problems of leading and being unable to spring from muddy ground, highlights the significance of John Coleman's 103 goals in 18 matches.

== Awards ==
- The 1952 VFL Premiership team was Geelong.
- The VFL's leading goalkicker was John Coleman of Essendon with 103 goals.
- The winner of the 1952 Brownlow Medal was Roy Wright of Richmond with 21 votes. He won on a count-back from Bill Hutchison of Essendon.
  - As a consequence of its 1981 decision to change its rules relating to tied Brownlow Medal contests, the AFL awarded a retrospective medal to Bill Hutchison in 1989.
- St Kilda took the "wooden spoon" in 1952.

== Sources ==
- 1952 VFL season at AFL Tables
- 1952 VFL season at Australian Football
