= Dave Coutts =

Dave Coutts may refer to:

- Dave Coutts (musician), member of Ten Inch Men
- Dave Coutts (footballer) (1905–1956), Australian rules footballer
