= Harry Rigby =

Harry Rigby may refer to:

- Harry Rigby (producer) (1925–1985), American theatre producer and writer
- Harry Rigby (aviator) (1896–1972), Australian World War I flying ace
- Harry Rigby (footballer) (1878–1924), Australian rules footballer
