= Frank Halloran =

Frank Halloran may refer to:

== People ==
- Frank Halloran (Australian footballer) (1912–1966), Australian rules football player
- Frank Halloran (rugby league) (1912–1980), New Zealand rugby league player

== Fictional Characters ==
- Frank Halloran (comics), the alternate identity of DC Comics supervillain Kid Amazo
