= John McCashney (footballer, born 1932) =

Australian rules footballer (1932–2023)

Personal information
- Full name: John Thomas McCashney
- Born: 31 May 1932; Trentham, Victoria
- Died: 8 July 2023 (aged 91); Forest Hill
- Original teams: Trentham, Kyneton
- Height: 171 cm (5 ft 7 in)
- Weight: 73 kg (161 lb)
- Position: Rover

Playing career^{1}
Years	Club	Games (Goals)
1953–54	Hawthorn	4 (0)
- ^{1} Playing statistics correct to the end of 1954.

John Thomas "Jack" McCashney (31 May 1932 – 8 July 2023) was an Australian rules footballer who played with Hawthorn in the Victorian Football League (VFL).

McCashney was born in Trentham, Victoria, the fourth child of Thomas McCashney and Bessie Marshall Hodgkins. He is the nephew of John, Frank and Jim McCashney and commenced his football career playing with the Trentham and Kyneton Football Clubs. He made his debut for Hawthorn in 1953 but struggled to gain a place in the side, mostly playing in the reserves during his two seasons at the club.

He married Marie Norma Foster in 1960 and they had four children. They lived in Ballarat before retiring to live in Echuca.
