= Kyneton Football Club =

Australian rules football and netball club

Kyneton

Names
- Full name: Kyneton Football & Netball Club
- Nickname: Tigers

2025 season
- Home-and-away season: 6th
- Leading goalkicker: Angus Nolte (57)

Club details
- Founded: 1868; 158 years ago (Note: Date according to club's website.)
- Colours
- Competition: RDFL
- Coach: Ethan Foreman
- Premierships: 1891, 1892, 1893, 1902, 1903, 1904, 1906, 1908, 1928, 1931, 1945; BFL 1936, 1960, 1961, 1966, 1995, 1997 (17)
- Ground: Kyneton Showgrounds (capacity: 5,000)

Uniforms
Home

Other information
- Official website: kynetonfnc.com

The Kyneton Football Netball Club, nicknamed the Tigers, is an Australian rules football and netball club based in the town of Kyneton, Victoria. Kyneton teams currently compete in the Riddell District Football League. The club transferred there after the 2023 season.

== History ==
It has been said that Kyneton was the Victorian town where the first organised regional football match was contested, although the first recorded country football match was on the Camp Reserve, Castlemaine was in September 1855 between a team of Army soldiers and a team of goldminers.

The first match in Kyneton was held in the early 1860s, with 84 players (42 by side) on the field. The match was played at the Showgrounds Oval.

Kyneton FC is recorded as playing two matches against Redesdale, one in October 1868 and the return match was played in November 1868, but Kyneton did not play in a formal local competition until 1891, even though they were registered with the Victorian Football Association from 1877 to 1885 and played against Hawthorn, Essendon and Carlton a number of times in the late 1870s and early 1880s.

Formal rural football competitions commenced in Ballarat starting in 1869 and Castlemaine's in 1871, being the first competitions in the region until the Victorian Football Association was founded in 1877.

In 1887, the club played 17 matches, the most since the club was formed, but no formal competition.

The club played against the touring British footballers in 1888.

In 1895 at the annual meeting of the Kyneton United Football Club it was resolved to reform the club and change the name to the Kyneton Football Club.

In 1898, Kyneton Junior FC and Kyneton Senior FC merged to form the Kyneton Football Club and adopting the club colours of blue and white.

In 1899, the Kyneton District Football Club was formed and the club colours were red, white and blue.

After World War Two, Kyneton participated in the Castlemaine District Football League in 1945 and 1946, prior to re-joining the Bendigo Football League in 1947.

The club went into recess in 2013 citing a player shortage, but returned to the competition in 2014. At the end of 2023 the club decided to transfer from the Bendigo Football League to the Riddell District Football League.

Football Timeline

- 1877 - 1885: Victorian Football Association
- 1891 - 1894: Kyneton Football Association
- 1895 - Woodend District Football Association
- 1896 - Kyneton District Football Association
- 1897 - 1898: Club active, but no official competition.
- 1899 - Kyneton Football Association
- 1900 - Club active, but no official competition.
- 1901 - 1911: Kyneton District Football Association
- 1912 - Woodend District Football Association
- 1913 - 1915:Castlemaine District Football Association
- 1916 - 1918: Club in recess due to World War One.
- 1919 - 1920: Kyneton District Football Association
- 1921 - Castlemaine District Football Association
- 1922 - Trentham Football Association
- 1923 - 1925: Castlemaine District Football Association
- 1926 - 1930: Kyneton Football League
- 1931 - Midland Football League
- 1932 - 1940: Bendigo Football League
- 1941 - 1944: Club in recess due to World War Two.
- 1945 - 1946: Castlemaine District Football Association
- 1947 - 2012: Bendigo Football League
- 2013 - Club in recess
- 2014 - 2019: Bendigo Football League
- 2020 - Club in recess due to COVID-19 lockdown
- 2021 - 2023: Bendigo Football League
- 2024 - 2025: Riddell District Football League

== Premierships ==
Senior Football

- Kyneton District Football Association
  - 1891 - 1st: Kyneton,
  - 1892 - 1st: Kyneton, 2nd: Woodend,
  - 1893 - 1st: Kyneton
  - 1902 - Kyneton: 4.4 - 28 d East Trentham: 2.6 - 18
  - 1903 - 1st: Kyneton, 2nd: Kyneton Collegians
  - 1904 - Kyneton: 5.5 - 35 d Malmsbury: 1.4 - 10
  - 1906 - 1st: Kyneton, 2nd: Kyneton Collegians
  - 1908 - Kyneton: ? d Trentham: ?
- Kyneton Football League
  - 1928 - Kyneton: 4.9 - 33 d Kyneton Collegians: 4.3 - 27
- Midland Football League
  - 1931 - Kyneton: 9.7 - 61 d Castlemaine Foundry: 5.11 - 41
- Bendigo Football League (6):
  - 1936 - Kyneton: 12.9 - 81 d Sandhurst: 10.8 - 68
  - 1960 - Kyneton: 9.8 - 62 d Rochester: 8.11 - 59
  - 1961 - Kyneton: 12.13 - 85 d Rochester: 9.6 - 80
  - 1966 - Kyneton:15.6 - 96 d Golden Square: 12.12 - 84
  - 1995 - Kyneton: 18.13 - 121 d South Bendigo: 11.10 - 76
  - 1997 - Kyneton: 18.15 - 123 d Golden Square: 7.14 - 56
- Castlemaine District Football League (1945 & 1946)
  - 1945

Reserves

- Bendigo Football League
  - 1975 - Kyneton: 9.14 - 68 drew with Sandhurst: 10.8 - 68 (Drawn Grand Final)
  - 1975 - Kyneton: ? d Sandhurst: ? (Grand Final Replay)

Thirds

- Bendigo Football League
  - 1997 - Kyneton: 10.4 - 64 d Eaglehawk: 4.13 - 37

== Runners Up ==
Seniors

- Bendigo Football League
  - 1957, 1959, 1963, 1976, 1996,

== VFL / AFL Players ==
The following footballers played with Kyneton prior to playing senior VFL / AFL football, with the year indicating their VFL debut.

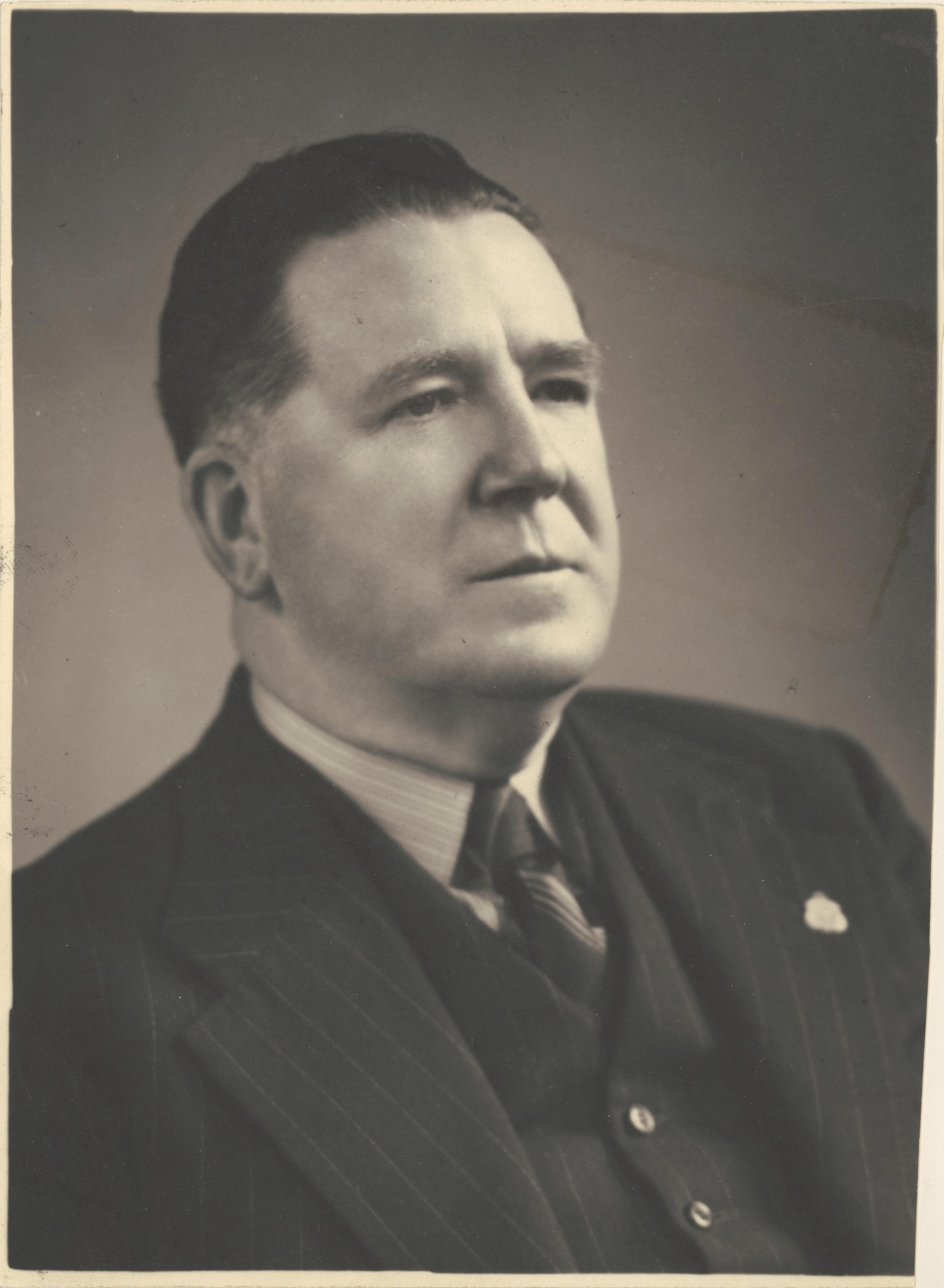
Alexander Fraser

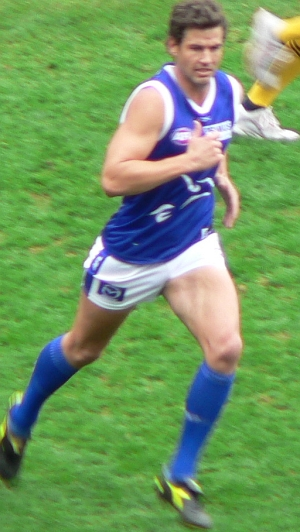
Nathan Thompson

Debut	Player's Name	VFL / AFL Club	Notes / References
1903	John McCashney	South Melbourne	
1907	Harry Rigby	Melbourne	
1914	Alexander Fraser	Melbourne	Federal & State Politician
1925	Jack Armstrong	St Kilda	
1935	Frank Halloran	Melbourne & Footscray	
1937	Ted Buckley	Melbourne	
1939	Hughie McPherson	Footscray & Melbourne	
1939	Clarrie Riordan	St Kilda	
1953	John Thomas McCashney	Hawthorn	
1957	Frank Hanrahan	St Kilda	
1958	Bill Arch	Carlton	
1958	Brian Bowe	St Kilda	
1959	Peter Barker	Footscray	
1959	Cliff Deacon	South Melbourne	
1959	Norm McKenzie	South Melbourne	
1967	Ian Thompson	North Melbourne	
1975	Danny Halloran	Carlton	
1976	Jim Buckley	Carlton	1979, 81 & 82 VFL Premierships
1983	Tony Kelly	Collingwood	
1998	Nathan Thompson	Hawthorn	
1999	Peter Welsh	Melbourne	
2009	Rhys Magin	Essendon	
2012	Jack Redpath	Footscray	

The following footballers played senior VFL / AFL football, prior to playing / coaching with Kyneton, with the year indicating their first season at Kyneton.

- 1928 - Gerry Beare - Richmond
- 1933 - Leo Wescott - Collingwood
- 1934 - Horrie Mason - St Kilda
- 1936 - Eric Little - Carlton
- 1936 - Bill Spurling - Footscray
- 1936 - Colin Strang - St Kilda
- 1936 - Doug Strang - Richmond
- 1947 - Albert Collier - Collingwood & Fitzroy
- 1951 - Wally Culpitt - Hawthorn
- 1953 - Harry Equid - Essendon
- 1954 - Brian Gilmore - Essendon & St Kilda
- 1954 - Bill Nolan - Collingwood
- 1954 - Fred Payne - Essendon
- 1957 - Clive Philp - Hawthorn
- 1959 - Ian Burt - Essendon
- 1959 - Bob Suter - Essendon
- 1960 - Kevin Parks - Essendon
- 1961 - Ken Peucker - Essendon
- 1962 - Greg Sewell - Essendon
- 1965 - Barry Matthews - Essendon
- 1966 - Les Kaine - Hawthorn
- 2003 - Phil Carman - Collingwood
- 2005 - Brett Cook - Fitzroy & St Kilda
- 2009 - Lance Picioane - Hawthorn

== Kyneton District Football Association ==
- 1891 to 1896 - Kyneton District Football Association
- 1897 to 1900 - KDFA in recess
- 1901 to 1911 - Kyneton District Football Association
- 1912 to 1918 - KDFA in recess
- 1919 to 1920 - Kyneton District Football Association
- 1921 to 1925 - KDFA in recess
- 1926 to 1930 - Kyneton District Football League

Premiers

- 1891 - Kyneton
- 1892 - 1st: Kyneton
- 1893 - Kyneton
- 1894 - 1st: Malmsbury, 2nd: Carlsruhe
- 1895 - Woodend: 3.1 - 19 d Kyneton: 0.6 - 6
- 1896 - Woodend
- 1897 - 1900: KDFA in recess.
- 1901 - Lauriston: 3.5 - 23 d Kyneton: 1.12 - 18
- 1902 - 1st: Kyneton
- 1903 - 1st: Kyneton
- 1904 - Kyneton
- 1905 - Malmsbury
- 1906 - 1st: Kyneton
- 1907 - Trentham*: 7.10 - 52 d Kyneton Collegians: 3.6 - 24
- 1908 - Kyneton: ? d Trentham: ?
- 1909 - ?. Semi Final: Kyneton d Macedon
- 1910 - Trentham: 5.8 - 38 d Macedon: 4.10 - 34
- 1911 - Daylesford: 1.17 - 23 d Trentham: 2.9 - 21
- 1912 - 1918: KDFA in recess.
- 1919 - Kyneton Collegians: 8.8 - 56 d Malmsbury: 3.8 - 26
- 1920 - Malmsbury: 5.16 - 46 d Trentham: 3.6 - 25
- 1921 - 1925: In recess?
- 1926 - Kyneton Collegians: 10.8 - 68 d Daylesford: 5.9 - 39
- 1927 - Daylesford 4.8 - 32 d Kyneton Collegians: 4.4 - 28
- 1928 - Kyneton 4.9 - 33 d Kyneton Collegians: 4.4 28
- 1929 - Kyneton Collegians 8.11 - 59 d Kyneton 5.14 - 44
- 1930 - Trentham: 5.9 - 39 d Malmsbury: 5.5 - 35

== Bibliography ==
- History of Football in the Bendigo District - John Stoward - ISBN 978-0-9805929-1-7
