= John W. Schultz =

Australian rules footballer

John Schultz

Personal information
- Full name: John W. Schultz
- Born: 26 February 1959 (age 67)
- Original team: Daylesford
- Height: 178 cm (5 ft 10 in)
- Weight: 78 kg (172 lb)

Playing career^{1}
Years	Club	Games (Goals)
1984	St Kilda	3 (0)
- ^{1} Playing statistics correct to the end of 1984.

John W. Schultz (born 26 February 1959) is a former Australian rules footballer who played with St Kilda in the Victorian Football League (VFL).

Schultz was defender, who came to St Kilda after winning a Henderson Medal in 1983, while with Ballarat Football League club Daylesford. The 25-year-old played games against Hawthorn, Geelong and Carlton in the 1984 VFL season.
