= Jim Gull =

Australian rules footballer

Personal information
- Full name: James Gull
- Born: 20 September 1928; Rainbow, Victoria
- Died: 7 November 2007 (aged 79)
- Original team: Kenmare
- Height: 177 cm (5 ft 10 in)
- Weight: 86 kg (190 lb)

Playing career^{1}
Years	Club	Games (Goals)
1949–1950	South Melbourne	21 (20)
- ^{1} Playing statistics correct to the end of 1950.

James Gull (20 September 1928 – 7 November 2007) was an Australian rules footballer who played with South Melbourne in the Victorian Football League (VFL).

Gull was a prolific centre half-forward in Victorian country football, especially in the Ballarat Football League, where he played for Daylesford.

He started his career at Kenmare in 1946, he won the South Mallee Football League Best and fairest that year as a sixteen-year-old. He made his way to South Melbourne. During his time at South Melbourne he struggled with injury, breaking three ribs.

In 1951 he left South Melbourne and moved to Rupanyup where he operated a Milk bar. He also was the playing coach of the town's football team. As a playing coach, Gull won the Toohey Medal in 1953, while with Rupanyup in the Wimmera Football League and later was the league leading goalkicker in 1957.

In 1958 he joined Daylesford and would go on to kick 889 goals in the Ballarat Football League. He topped the league's goal-kicking eight times, every year from 1958 to 1964 and again in 1968. His best season came in 1961 when he captain-coached Daylesford to a premiership and kicked a league record 159 goals. During the year he set another record when he kicked 21 goals and 13 behinds in a game against North Ballarat.

After leaving Daylesford, he continued playing football, at Elaine and Natte-Bealiba. Gull won the 1970 Lexton Football League goalkicking award with 68 goals for Natte-Bealiba.

He is estimated to have played 560 senior games over the course of his career.

In 1971 he played one game with North Ballarat with his son, Stewart Gull, who also played for South Melbourne.

His daughter, Robyn Maher, represented Australia at basketball.
