= Norm McKenzie =

Australian rules footballer

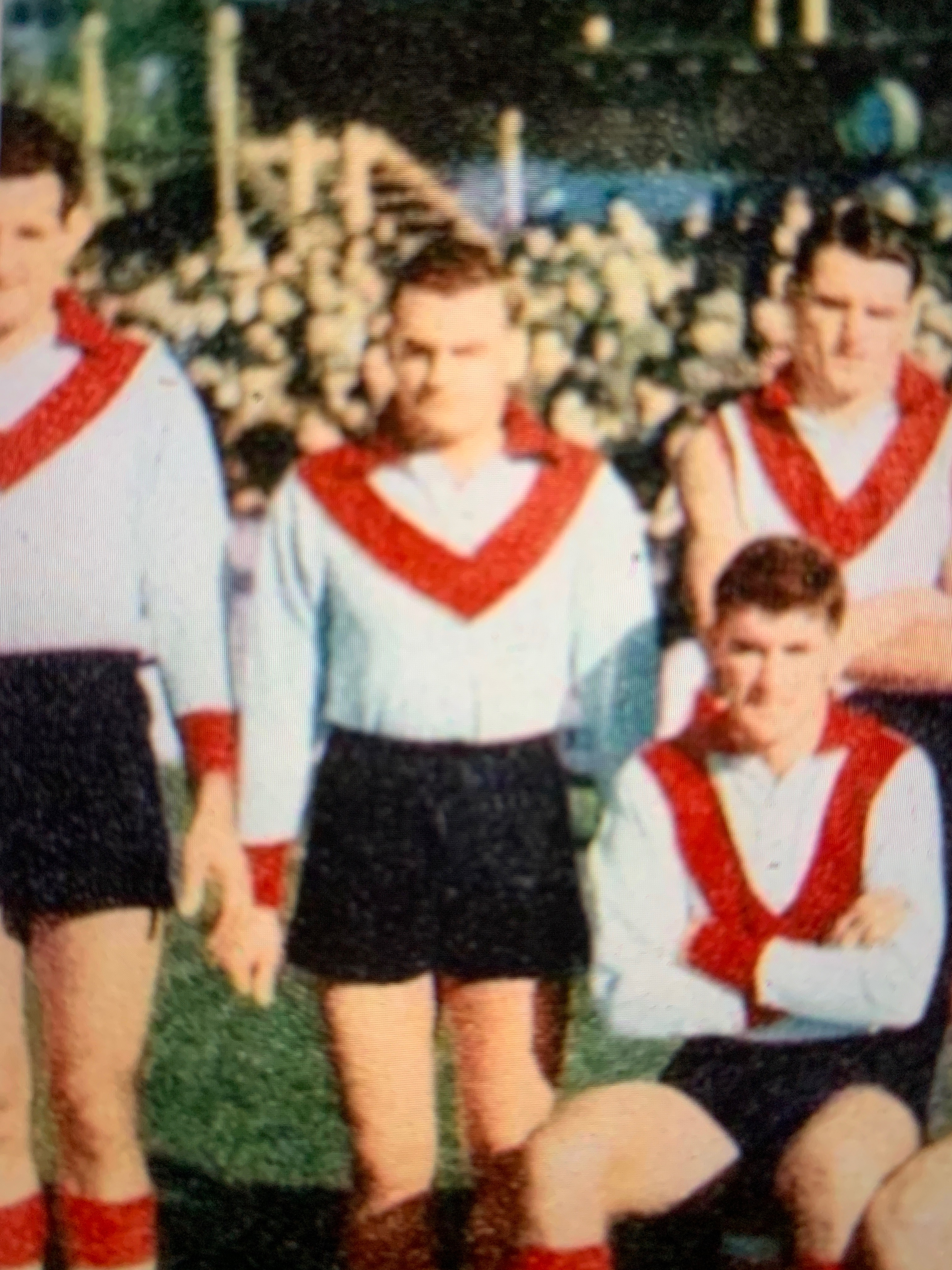
- Norm McKenzie for South Melbourne - 1960

Personal information
- Full name: Norm McKenzie
- Born: 21 October 1938; Trentham, Victoria
- Died: 19 July 2018 (aged 79)
- Original teams: Daylesford Football Club, Williamstown Rovers, Kyneton & Trentham
- Height: 175 cm (5 ft 9 in)
- Weight: 76 kg (168 lb)
- Position: Half-back/winger

Playing career^{1}
Years	Club	Games (Goals)
1959–62	South Melbourne	36 (5)
- ^{1} Playing statistics correct to the end of 1962.

Norm McKenzie (21 October 1938 – 19 July 2018) was an Australian rules footballer who played with South Melbourne in the Victorian Football League (VFL). McKenzie was a master of the drop kick and the stab pass, both of which are no longer common in the modern game. After retiring, McKenzie was coach of the Keilor Football Club and then later server as Secretary/President.
