= Cliff Deacon =

Australian rules footballer

Personal information
- Full name: Cliff Deacon
- Born: 10 June 1935 (age 91)
- Original team: Kyneton
- Height: 189 cm (6 ft 2 in)
- Weight: 92 kg (203 lb)
- Position: Ruckman

Playing career^{1}
Years	Club	Games (Goals)
1959–1963	South Melbourne	33 (1)
- ^{1} Playing statistics correct to the end of 1963.

Cliff Deacon (born 10 June 1935) is a former Australian rules footballer who played with South Melbourne in the Victorian Football League (VFL).

Deacon started his career with Williamstown Thirds and then joined Bendigo Football League club Kyneton, where he won a Michelsen in 1958. A ruckman, he was sought after by Hawthorn but as he had lived in South Melbourne territory while playing at Williamstown, the Swans refused to clear him and instead signed him up for themselves.

He had his most productive season in 1961 when he put together 14 appearances but he then had his career derailed by a knee injury. After having surgery, Deacon played only two more games for South Melbourne.
