= Terry Love =

Australian rules footballer

Personal information
- Full name: Terry Love
- Born: 4 November 1963 (age 62)
- Original team: Spotswood
- Height: 175 cm (5 ft 9 in)
- Weight: 73 kg (161 lb)

Playing career^{1}
Years	Club	Games (Goals)
1982–1983	Footscray	13 (11)
- ^{1} Playing statistics correct to the end of 1983.

Terry Love (born 4 November 1963) is a former Australian rules footballer who played with Footscray in the Victorian Football League (VFL).

Recruited locally from Spotswood, Love made nine appearances for Footscray in the 1982 VFL season. He had one of his best games against Carlton, when he amassed 16 disposals and kicked four goals.

He played just four games in 1983.

Love spent the next part of his career at Daylesford. He shared the Henderson Medal in 1985, with Don Discher of Ballarat.
