= Barry Matthews (footballer) =

Australian rules footballer

Personal information
- Full name: Barry W. Matthews
- Born: 2 November 1940 (age 86)
- Original team: Pascoe Vale
- Height: 173 cm (5 ft 8 in)
- Weight: 72 kg (159 lb)
- Positions: Rover, wingman

Playing career^{1}
Years	Club	Games (Goals)
1962–1964	Essendon	12 (2)
- ^{1} Playing statistics correct to the end of 1964.

Barry Matthews (born 2 November 1940) is a former Australian rules footballer who played for the Essendon Football Club in the Victorian Football League (VFL). Matthews won Essendon's reserves best and fairest in 1962. He later played for the Kyneton Football Club and Seaford Football Club.
