= Ken Peucker =

Australian rules footballer

Personal information
- Full name: Ken Peucker
- Born: 2 February 1935
- Died: 15 February 2005 (aged 70); Gold Coast
- Original team: Lincoln Stars
- Height: 173 cm (5 ft 8 in)
- Weight: 73 kg (161 lb)

Playing career^{1}
Years	Club	Games (Goals)
1954–1955	Essendon	27 (30)
1956–1957	South Adelaide	
1958–1961	Essendon	33 (38)
- ^{1} Playing statistics correct to the end of 1961.

Ken Peucker (2 February 1935 – 15 February 2005) was an Australian rules footballer who played with Essendon in the Victorian Football League (VFL).

Recruited from the Lincoln Stars in the Essendon District Football League, Peucker started out at Essendon in the Under-19s and played his first VFL game in 1954. A half-forward and rover, he kicked 27 goals for Essendon in the 1955 VFL season, a tally bettered by only two teammates.

Peucker spent his next two years in South Australia and was the leading goal-kicker at South Adelaide in 1957.

He returned to Essendon in 1958 but only played seven league games during the season. The following year he finished second in the Gardiner Medal count, for his contributions in the reserves, but also played for the seniors from round 14 onwards. He kicked four goals in Essendon's semi final win over Collingwood and was picked as a half forward flanker in the 1959 VFL Grand Final side, which Essendon lost.

Peucker played an equal career high 17 games in 1960 and after appearing in the opening round of the 1961 season, left the club for Bendigo Football League side Kyneton. He also played for Mount Gravatt, in Queensland.
