= Tony Kelly (Australian footballer) =

Australian rules footballer

Personal information
- Full name: Anthony John Kelly
- Born: 24 February 1963 (age 63)
- Original team: Kyneton / Preston
- Height: 175 cm (5 ft 9 in)
- Weight: 70 kg (154 lb)

Playing career^{1}
| Years | Club | Games (Goals) |
| 1983–1985 | Collingwood | 10 (3) |
- ^{1} Playing statistics correct to the end of 1985.

Anthony John "Tony" Kelly (born 24 February 1963) is a former Australian rules footballer who played with Collingwood in the Victorian Football League (VFL).

Originally from Trentham, Kelly began playing senior football for Kyneton in 1979. The following year he played in the Melbourne reserves, then returned to Kyneton. In 1982 he was at Victorian Football Association club Preston and was a member of the team which lost that year's grand final to Port Melbourne.

From 1983 to 1985, Kelly played league football for Collingwood. He made five appearances in 1983, four in 1984, then just one in 1985. Before the beginning of the 1986 season, Kelly was let go by Collingwood.

Back at Kyneton, Kelly won a best and fairest in 1988. He spent the next two seasons coaching Hepburn and led to club to the 1989 premiership. In 1991 he rejoined Kyneton, as coach, a job he held for two years. Kelly won Kyneton's best and fairest award again in 1992 and for a third time in 2000, his final season. He played in their 1995 and 1997 premiership sides.

He was inducted into the Bendigo Football League Hall of Fame in 2010, for his 265-game career at Kyneton.
