= Jack Armstrong (Australian footballer) =

Australian rules footballer

Personal information
- Full name: John Basil Armstrong
- Born: 21 April 1899; Kyneton, Victoria
- Died: 21 January 1942 (aged 42); Waverley, New South Wales
- Original team: Sydney / Kyneton
- Height: 185 cm (6 ft 1 in)
- Weight: 83 kg (183 lb)

Playing career^{1}
Years	Club	Games (Goals)
1925	St Kilda	14 (6)
- ^{1} Playing statistics correct to the end of 1925.

Jack Basil Armstrong (21 April 1899 – 21 January 1942) was an Australian rules footballer who played with St Kilda in the Victorian Football League (VFL).

Prior to his football career Armstrong had enlisted on his eighteenth birthday to serve in World War I, serving in England and France.
