= Peter Barker (footballer) =

Australian rules footballer (born 1936)

Personal information
- Full name: Peter Barker
- Born: 16 January 1936 (age 90)
- Original team: Kyneton
- Height: 188 cm (6 ft 2 in)
- Weight: 88 kg (194 lb)

Playing career^{1}
Years	Club	Games (Goals)
1959	Footscray	1 (0)
- ^{1} Playing statistics correct to the end of 1959.

Peter Barker (born 16 January 1936) is a former Australian rules footballer who played with Footscray in the Victorian Football League (VFL).
