= Vic Bodsworth =

Australian rules footballer

Personal information
- Full name: Vic Bodsworth
- Born: 10 July 1931
- Died: 3 December 1967 (aged 36)
- Height: 170 cm (5 ft 7 in)
- Weight: 70 kg (154 lb)

Playing career^{1}
Years	Club	Games (Goals)
1949–1950	Footscray	5 (5)
- ^{1} Playing statistics correct to the end of 1950.

Vic Bodsworth (10 July 1931 – 3 December 1967) was an Australian rules footballer who played with Footscray in the Victorian Football League (VFL).

Bodsworth, a locally recruited rover, made his way up from the thirds to play two VFL seasons at Footscray.

He then joined Yarraville in the Victorian Football Association.

Bodsworth also spent some time playing for Daylesford in the Ballarat Football League and won a Henderson Medal in 1954.

After leaving Daylesford, he returned to Yarraville, then signed with Minyip as coach.
