= Bill Arch =

Australian rules footballer

Personal information
- Full name: William Arch
- Born: 26 March 1937 (age 89)
- Original team: Kyneton
- Height: 180 cm (5 ft 11 in)
- Weight: 73 kg (161 lb)
- Position: Wing

Playing career^{1}
Years	Club	Games (Goals)
1958–62	Carlton	38 (12)
- ^{1} Playing statistics correct to the end of 1962.

Bill Arch (born 26 March 1937) is a former Australian rules footballer who played with Carlton in the Victorian Football League (VFL)
