= Les Kaine =

Australian rules footballer

Personal information
- Born: 8 August 1936
- Died: 18 August 2012 (aged 76); Coleraine, Victoria
- Original team: Coleraine
- Height: 185 cm (6 ft 1 in)
- Weight: 83 kg (183 lb)

Playing career^{1}
Years	Club	Games (Goals)
1956–1962	Hawthorn	103 (80)
- ^{1} Playing statistics correct to the end of 1962.

Career highlights
- 1961 VFL Premiership player

Les Kaine (8 August 1936 – 18 August 2012) was an Australian rules footballer who played for Hawthorn in the Victorian Football League (VFL).

Kaine started his career as a forward but was pushed into defence later in his career. He played a fullback in Hawthorn's winning Grand Final in 1961.

For the rest of the 1960s he played in the Bendigo Football League with Castlemaine and Kyneton. He was the league's leading goal-kicker while playing at Kyneton in 1966, with 84 goals.
