= Ian Burt =

Australian rules footballer

Personal information
- Full name: Charles Ian Burt
- Born: 2 February 1937
- Original team: Redan
- Height: 183 cm (6 ft 0 in)
- Weight: 85 kg (187 lb)

Playing career^{1}
Years	Club	Games (Goals)
1959	Essendon	4 (0)
- ^{1} Playing statistics correct to the end of 1959.

Charles Ian Burt (born 2 February 1937) is a former Australian rules footballer who played with Essendon in the Victorian Football League (VFL).

Burt started his career in 1956, with Ballarat Football League club Redan. He made four appearances for Essendon in the 1959 VFL season, on a permit.

A follower, Burt continued playing for Redan until being appointed captain-coach of Cressy in 1961. He steered Cressy to a premiership on his first attempt and did the same for Newlyn in 1962.

From 1963 to 1965, Burt played for Kyneton in the Bendigo Football League. He won the league's best and fairest award in 1964.

He returned to the Ballarat league in 1966 to captain-coach Daylesford.
