= Danny Halloran =

Australian rules footballer

Personal information
- Full name: Daniel Francis Halloran
- Born: 4 July 1954; Kyneton, Victoria
- Died: 17 February 2012 (aged 57); North Melbourne, Victoria
- Original team: Kyneton
- Height: 189 cm (6 ft 2 in)
- Weight: 92 kg (203 lb)

Playing career^{1}
Years	Club	Games (Goals)
1975–1977	Carlton	15 (4)
- ^{1} Playing statistics correct to the end of 1977.

Daniel Francis Halloran (4 July 1954 – 17 February 2012) was an Australian rules footballer who played with Carlton in the Victorian Football League (VFL).

After being recruited from Kyneton, Halloran debuted for the Blues in 1975, playing 4 games. He played a further 10 games in 1976 and 1 more game in 1977. He was forced into retirement after breaking his ankle in an Ice Skating accident.

He died in his sleep on 17 February 2012 from unknown causes. His father Frank also played in the VFL in the 1930s.
