= Frank Hanrahan =

Australian rules footballer (1938–2025)

Personal information
- Full name: Francis John Hanrahan
- Born: 20 January 1938
- Died: 20 November 2025 (aged 87); Wodonga
- Original team: Kyneton
- Height: 177 cm (5 ft 10 in)
- Weight: 73 kg (161 lb)

Playing career
Years	Club	Games (Goals)
1956–58	St Kilda	17 (1)

Francis John Hanrahan (20 January 1938 – 20 November 2025) was an Australian rules footballer who played with St Kilda in the Victorian Football League (VFL).

== VFL career ==
Frank Hanrahan was recruited from Kyneton and made his senior debut in Round 3 of 1956 against Carlton. Across his 17 games he played on the wing, the centre and a half-back flanker.

== Post VFL ==
He returned to his country club Kyneton in 1959. He later played for Glen Waverley (Caulfield Oakleigh DFL) and then Wodonga Ovens & Murray Football League from 1963 to 1966, was non-playing coach of Wodonga in 1977 and Chiltern Ovens & King Football League in 1978.
