= Clarrie Riordan =

Australian rules footballer (1917–1995)

Personal information
- Full name: Clarence Hector Riordan
- Born: 1 August 1917; Kyneton, Victoria
- Died: 29 September 1995 (aged 78)
- Original team: Kyneton
- Height: 183 cm (6 ft 0 in)
- Weight: 77 kg (170 lb)

Playing career^{1}
Years	Club	Games (Goals)
1939–40	St Kilda	13 (0)
- ^{1} Playing statistics correct to the end of 1940.

Clarence Hector Riordan (1 August 1917 – 29 September 1995) was an Australian rules footballer who played with St Kilda in the Victorian Football League (VFL).
