= Ian Thompson (Australian footballer) =

Australian rules footballer

Personal information
- Full name: Ian Thompson
- Born: 26 June 1949 (age 77)
- Original team: Kyneton
- Height: 183 cm (6 ft 0 in)
- Weight: 75 kg (165 lb)

Playing career^{1}
Years	Club	Games (Goals)
1967–69	North Melbourne	17 (29)
- ^{1} Playing statistics correct to the end of 1969.

Ian Thompson (born 26 June 1949) is a former Australian rules footballer who played with North Melbourne in the Victorian Football League (VFL).
