= Rhys Magin =

Australian rules football player (born 1989)

Personal information
- Full name: Rhys Magin
- Born: 4 March 1989 (age 37); Nambour, Queensland
- Original team: Zillmere
- Draft: 5th overall, 2007 Rookie draft Essendon
- Height: 180 cm (5 ft 11 in)
- Weight: 73 kg (161 lb)
- Position: Half-Forward

Playing career^{1}
Years	Club	Games (Goals)
2009	Essendon	4 (2)
- ^{1} Playing statistics correct to the end of 2008.

Rhys Magin (born 4 March 1989) is an Australian rules football player who was on the rookie list in 2008 and 2009 for the Essendon Football Club in the Australian Football League. He played junior football primarily in a half-forward flank position however it is noted he can play in both a forward and defensive role.

== Early life ==
Magin was born and raised in Nambour, Queensland and began playing junior football with Noosa Tigers. Magin went on to play senior football with Zillmere in the QAFL. He represented Queensland at the 2007 Under-18 Championships.

== AFL career ==
Prior to round 16 Magin was elevated off the rookie list to replace the injured Jason Winderlich Magin made his AFL debut in round 19 against West Coast Eagles.

Magin was delisted at the end of 2009.

== Post AFL ==
Magin played with Essendon District Football League (EDFL) side Avondale Heights for the 2010 season with the club's new coach triple premiership player Chris Johnson. In 2015 he joined Kyneton Football Club in the Bendigo Football League.
