= Brian Bowe =

Australian rules footballer (born 1936)

Personal information
- Full name: Brian Bowe
- Born: 15 March 1936
- Original team: Kyneton (BFL)
- Height: 173 cm (5 ft 8 in)
- Weight: 74 kg (163 lb)

Playing career^{1}
Years	Club	Games (Goals)
1958–59	St Kilda	14 (0)
- ^{1} Playing statistics correct to the end of 1959.

Brian Bowe (born March 15, 1936) is a former Australian rules footballer who played with St Kilda in the Victorian Football League (VFL) and Norwood in the South Australian Football League (SANFL).

== Biography ==
Brian Bowe was born on March 15, 1936. He played in for Kyneton from 1952 to 1957, St. Kilda in 1958 and 1959, and then again for Kyneton in 1960. In November 1960, he was recruited by Alan Killigrew to play for Norwood Football Club. He played there from 1961 to 1965, competing in 74 games.
