= Hughie McPherson =

Australian rules footballer, born 1918

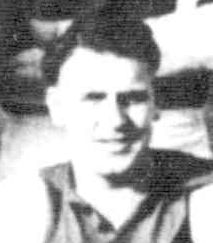

Personal information
- Full name: Hugh Lachlan McPherson
- Born: 21 August 1918; Kyneton, Victoria
- Died: 25 July 2013 (aged 94)
- Original team: Kyneton
- Height: 180 cm (5 ft 11 in)
- Weight: 80 kg (176 lb)
- Position: Ruck / defence

Playing career^{1}
Years	Club	Games (Goals)
1939–40	Footscray	13 (4)
1941–44	Melbourne	37 (14)
Total		50 (18)
- ^{1} Playing statistics correct to the end of 1944.

Hugh Lachlan McPherson (21 August 1918 – 25 July 2013) was an Australian rules footballer who played with Footscray and Melbourne in the Victorian Football League (VFL).
