= Dave Coutts (footballer) =

Australian rules footballer

Personal information
- Full name: Dave Coutts
- Born: 5 March 1905
- Died: 14 August 1956 (aged 51)
- Original teams: State Savings Bank, Daylesford

Playing career^{1}
Years	Club	Games (Goals)
1930	South Melbourne	5 (0)
- ^{1} Playing statistics correct to the end of 1930.

Dave Coutts (5 March 1905 – 14 August 1956) was an Australian rules footballer who played with South Melbourne in the Victorian Football League (VFL).
