= Ralph Edwards (footballer) =

Australian rules footballer (1935–2019)

Personal information
- Full name: Ralph Graham Edwards
- Born: 7 June 1935
- Died: 13 October 2019 (aged 84)
- Original team: Daylesford
- Height: 183 cm (6 ft 0 in)
- Weight: 80 kg (176 lb)

Playing career^{1}
Years	Club	Games (Goals)
1959	Footscray	4 (0)
- ^{1} Playing statistics correct to the end of 1959.

Ralph Edwards (7 June 1935 – 13 October 2019) was an Australian rules footballer who played with Footscray in the Victorian Football League.
