= Stewart Gull (footballer) =

Australian rules footballer

Personal information
- Full name: Stewart Gull
- Born: 24 June 1951 (age 75)
- Original team: North Ballarat
- Height: 191 cm (6 ft 3 in)
- Weight: 87 kg (192 lb)
- Position: Centre half forward

Playing career^{1}
| Years | Club | Games (Goals) |
| 1972–78 | South Melbourne | 87 (151) |
| 1979 | Melbourne | 2 (1) |
| Total | | 89 (152) |
- ^{1} Playing statistics correct to the end of 1979.

Stewart Gull (born 24 June 1951) is a former Australian rules footballer who played for South Melbourne and Melbourne in the Victorian Football League (VFL) during the 1970s.

The son of former South Melbourne centre half forward Jim Gull, Stewart played in the same position as his father. His sister Robyn Maher is an Olympic bronze medal-winning basketballer.

Gull, after being recruited from North Ballarat, kicked three goals on his league debut, against Hawthorn at Lake Oval. He had his most prolific season in 1976 when he booted 36 goals, which was bettered only by Robert Dean from his club, with 37. Two years later, in a high scoring game against Geelong, Gull kicked eight goals but finished on the losing team despite South Melbourne amassing 155 points.

A competitive boxer, Gull struggled with injuries during his career and over the years suffered from Achilles tendon, cartilage and calf injuries. When he crossed to Melbourne in 1979, he could only manage two appearances before breaking his collarbone against a goal post, which prompted his retirement. He never got to play in a finals match.
