= Eric Little (footballer) =

Australian rules footballer

Personal information
- Full name: Eric Richard Little
- Born: 28 May 1910; Eaglehawk, Victoria
- Died: 10 April 1999 (aged 88)
- Original team: Coburg
- Height: 173 cm (5 ft 8 in)
- Weight: 71 kg (157 lb)

Playing career^{1}
Years	Club	Games (Goals)
1931–1934	Carlton	25 (5)
1934	Kyneton	? (?)
1935	St Kilda	14 (1)
Total		39 (6)
- ^{1} Playing statistics correct to the end of 1935.

Career highlights
- 1936 BFL Premiership

Eric Richard Little (28 May 1910 – 10 April 1999) was an Australian rules footballer who played with Carlton and St Kilda in the Victorian Football League (VFL).

Little "made a promising debut" in round 18 against St Kilda, then went onto play in two finals matches for the Blues.

Little played for Kyneton in the second half of the 1934 season, after being cleared by Carlton.

In 1935, Little played with St Kilda.

Little was captain-coach of Kyneton in 1936 and 1937, winning the 1936 Bendigo Football League premiership.

In March 1938, Little was appointed as captain-coach of Dimboola in the Wimmera Football League.

Little then played with Coburg Football Club in the VFA in 1939 and 1940.
