= Eric K. Little =

United States Army major general

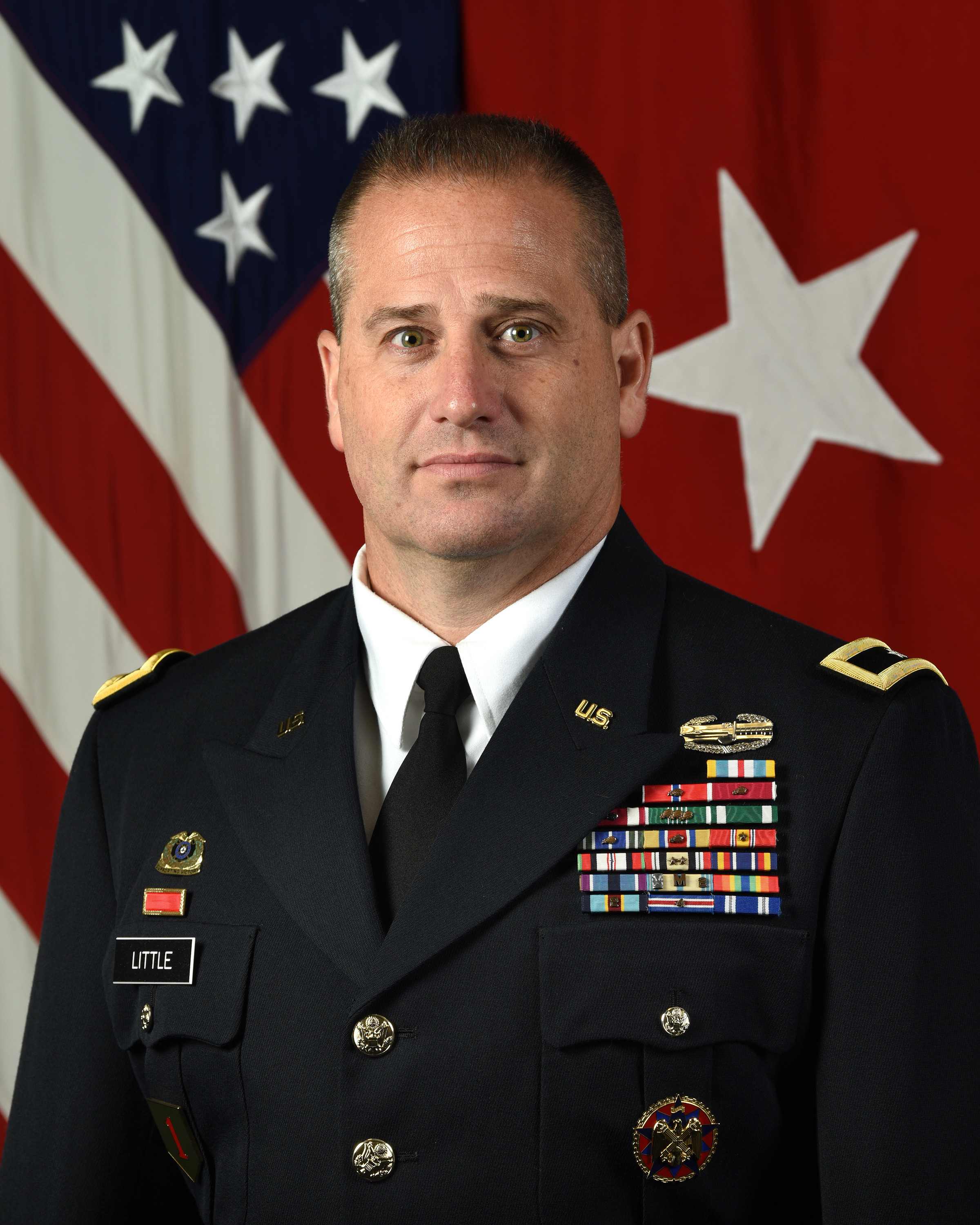
- Official portrait, 2019
- Military career
- Allegiance: United States
- Branch: United States Army
- Service years: 1989–present
- Rank: Major General
- Units: National Guard Bureau; Illinois Army National Guard
- Commands: 65th Troop Command Brigade
- Conflicts: Iraq War; Afghan War

Eric K. Little is a United States Army major general who serves at the National Guard Bureau in Washington DC as the special assistant to the chief, National Guard Bureau. He previously served Director of Manpower and Personnel before being fired in August 2023 after substantiated complaints of rampant sexism. He had previously served within the Illinois Army National Guard as the Chief of Staff until 2018.

== Military career ==
Eric Little joined the Illinois Army National Guard in 1989 and received his commission as a Second Lieutenant in August, 1992. He served as a quartermaster officer and deployed both in support of the Iraq War and Afghan War. In December 2012 he took command of the 65th Troop Command Brigade as a Colonel From there he served two different stints as the Illinois Army National Guard Chief of Staff before departing for the National Guard Bureau as the deputy director, J-8/Programs in 2018. In 2020 he became the Director, Manpower and Personnel at the National Guard Bureau. This job entailed leading the National Guard's Sexual Assault and Harassment Response and Equal Opportunity programs.

Little was an advocate for mental health for National Guard soldiers, realizing their part-time status was hindering their ability to seek help through military provided means.

== Firing ==
In August 2023, Major General Little was fired from his position as the Director, Manpower and Personnel after the Inspector General substantiated complaints of sexist comments and counterproductive leadership. The investigation found a "toxic cacophony of misconduct" dating back several years to his previous assignments. The original substantiated complaints dated from prior to his promotion to Major General and amounted to "frat-house behavior" while causing enough concern that another separate investigation was opened up looking into Little's behavior.

Some raised questions as to how Little had become the top personnel officer for the Army National Guard despite never attending any human resources professional military education. After being fired, Little was moved to become a special assistant to the Chief of the National Guard Bureau pending his retirement from the Army.

== Dates of Rank ==
Insignia	Rank	Component	Dates
	Second Lieutenant	ARNG	21 August 1992
	First Lieutenant	ARNG	20 August 1995
	Captain	ARNG	10 October 1997
	Major	ARNG	26 October 2002
	Lieutenant Colonel	ARNG	6 March 2008
	Colonel	ARNG	17 December 2011
	Brigadier General	ARNG	16 January 2018
	Major General	ARNG	16 October 2020
