= Eric Coutts =

Australian rules footballer, born 1913

Personal information
- Full name: Eric Coutts
- Born: 30 December 1913
- Died: 16 August 2001 (aged 87)
- Original team: Daylesford
- Height: 183 cm (6 ft 0 in)
- Weight: 85 kg (187 lb)

Playing career^{1}
Years	Club	Games (Goals)
1936	Essendon	1 (0)
- ^{1} Playing statistics correct to the end of 1936.

Eric Coutts (30 December 1913 – 16 August 2001) was an Australian rules footballer who played with Essendon in the Victorian Football League (VFL).
