= Frank Halloran (Australian footballer) =

Australian rules footballer, born 1912

Personal information
- Full name: Frank Halloran
- Born: 13 December 1912
- Died: 1 July 1966 (aged 53)
- Original team: Kyneton
- Height: 183 cm (6 ft 0 in)
- Weight: 90 kg (198 lb)

Playing career^{1}
Years	Club	Games (Goals)
1935	Melbourne	3 (1)
1937	Footscray	4 (0)
Total		7 (1)
- ^{1} Playing statistics correct to the end of 1937.

Frank Halloran (13 December 1912 – 1 July 1966) was an Australian rules footballer who played with Melbourne and Footscray in the Victorian Football League (VFL).

Halloran played in just two VFL seasons. He started and finished his career at Kyneton and in 1938 was awarded the Bendigo Football League's best and fairest award, the Fred Wood Medal.

His son Danny also played in the VFL, for Carlton in the 1970s.
