= Charlie Marendaz =

Australian rules footballer

Personal information
- Full name: Charlie Marendaz
- Born: 2 September 1935 (age 91)
- Original team: Daylesford
- Height: 175 cm (5 ft 9 in)
- Weight: 86 kg (190 lb)

Playing career^{1}
Years	Club	Games (Goals)
1956	North Melbourne	6 (0)
- ^{1} Playing statistics correct to the end of 1956.

Charlie Marendaz (born 2 September 1935) is a former Australian rules footballer who played with North Melbourne in the Victorian Football League (VFL).

Marendaz played six senior games for North Melbourne, in the 1956 VFL season.

He also made many appearances for Daylesford and won the Henderson Medal in 1966.
