= Ray Sartori =

Australian rules footballer

Personal information
- Full name: Henry Raymond Sartori
- Born: 31 March 1885; Daylesford, Victoria
- Died: 14 July 1961 (aged 76); Melbourne, Victoria
- Original team: Daylesford

Playing career^{1}
Years	Club	Games (Goals)
1906–07	Essendon	7 (1)
- ^{1} Playing statistics correct to the end of 1907.

Henry Raymond Sartori (31 March 1885 – 14 July 1961) was an Australian rules footballer who played with Essendon in the Victorian Football League (VFL).
