= Bill Nolan (footballer, born 1927) =

Australian rules footballer

Personal information
- Full name: William Henry Nolan
- Born: 4 November 1926
- Died: 14 August 2002 (aged 75)
- Original team: Northcote
- Height: 183 cm (6 ft 0 in)
- Weight: 76 kg (168 lb)
- Position: Defence

Playing career^{1}
Years	Club	Games (Goals)
1947–51	Collingwood	60 (0)
- ^{1} Playing statistics correct to the end of 1951.

William Henry Nolan (4 November 1926 – 14 August 2002) was an Australian rules footballer who played with Collingwood in the Victorian Football League (VFL). He was originally from Northcote and returned to the club after his time at Collingwood.

Nolan later played at Daylesford (Ballarat Football League) and coached Kyneton (Bendigo Football League), and he lived in Kyneton after his football career.
