= Terry Philippe =

Australian rules footballer (born 1957)

Personal information
- Full name: Terry Philippe
- Born: 16 July 1957 (age 69)
- Original team: North Heidelberg
- Height: 188 cm (6 ft 2 in)
- Weight: 89 kg (196 lb)

Playing career^{1}
Years	Club	Games (Goals)
1978	Collingwood	5 (1)
- ^{1} Playing statistics correct to the end of 1978.

Terry Philippe (born 16 July 1957) is a former Australian rules footballer who played with Collingwood in the Victorian Football League (VFL).

Recruited from North Heidelberg, Philippe played in 5 games and scored 1 goal in his time with Collingwood. His VFL career end when a stray boot caused a fractured skull.

Philippe left for West Perth in 1979, he played there until he injured his knee the following year. He returned to Victoria and let his knee heal.

In 1984 he accepted a contract to play with Daylesford in the Ballarat Football League. He kicked 100 goals a season two years in a row before moving on to the Western District town of Camperdown. He spent two years at Camperdown, where he kicked 90 goals in his first year.
