= Harry Rigby (footballer) =

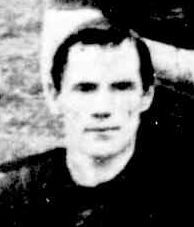

Personal information
- Full name: Claude Henry Rigby
- Born: 9 January 1878; Kyneton, Victoria
- Died: 7 December 1924 (aged 46); Clifton Hill, Victoria

Playing career^{1}
Years	Club	Games (Goals)
1900–1902	Carlton (VFL)	29 (2)
1904	Collingwood Juniors (VJFA)	
1905–1906	Richmond (VFA)	
1907–1908	Melbourne (VFL)	27 (0)
Total		56 (2)
- ^{1} Playing statistics correct to the end of 1908.

Claude Henry Rigby (9 January 1878 – 7 December 1924) was a pharmacist, and a former Australian rules footballer who played with Carlton and Melbourne in the Victorian Football League (VFL), and with Richmond Football Club in the VFA.

== Family ==
The son of Dr. George Owen Rigby (1916), and Frances Maria Rigby (1841-1926), née English, Claude Henry Rigby was born at Kyneton, Victoria on 9 January 1878. He married Isabella Ellen Megson (1881-1952) in 1908.

== Football ==
He was a "fleet-footed, lightly framed wingman".

=== Carlton (VFL) ===
Recruited from Kyneton, he played 29 games for Carlton Football Club over the three seasons, 1900 to 1902.

In 1900 he played for a VFL intrastate team, against a combined Ballarat Association team.

He played his last game for Carlton against Fitzroy on 7 June 1902 (round 6); and, a week later, he turned out for Kyneton Collegians in the Kyneton District Football Association.

=== Collingwood Juniors Football Club (VJFA) ===
In 1904 he was granted a clearance from both the Kyneton Football Club and Carlton to Collingwood Juniors Football Club in the Victorian Junior Football Association.

=== Richmond (VFA) ===
Granted a clearance from Carlton in 1905, he played for the Richmond Football Club in 1905 and 1906; and, playing on the wing, was a member of the 1905 Richmond (VFA) premiership team.

=== Melbourne (VFL) ===
He played 27 games for the Melbourne Football Club in two seasons, 1907 and 1908.

== Death ==
A qualified pharmacist, and although in poor health, Rigby died unexpectedly — "[as] the result of a severe attack of ptomaine poisoning" — at his U.F.S. dispensary in Queens Parade, Clifton Hill, Victoria, on 7 December 1924.
