= Frank McCashney =

Australian rules footballer

Personal information
- Full name: Francis James McCashney
- Born: 9 August 1890; Trentham, Victoria
- Died: 19 July 1951 (aged 60); South Melbourne, Victoria
- Original team: Trentham
- Height: 174 cm (5 ft 9 in)
- Weight: 72 kg (159 lb)
- Position: Wing

Playing career^{1}
Years	Club	Games (Goals)
1909–1915	Richmond	82 (8)
- ^{1} Playing statistics correct to the end of 1915.

Francis James "Frank" McCashney (9 August 1890 – 19 July 1951) was an Australian rules footballer who played with Richmond in the Victorian Football League (VFL).

McCashney was the sixth of ten children born to Henry William McCashney and Mary Anne Robson. McCashney's family owned a sawmill at Trentham and he commenced his football career playing with the Trentham club. He made his debut for Richmond in 1909 and became a prominent player in their side during the pre-war period. He was a great stab kick who could send long driving left foot kicks downfield and in 1913 he represented Victoria against South Australia. Two of his brothers, John McCashney (South Melbourne) and Jim McCashney (Hawthorn), also played VFL football.

He married Daisy Ella Smith in 1916 and they had three children. They lived in Richmond and he worked as a mechanic after his football career. Frank McCashney died of cancer in 1951.
