= Jim McCashney =

Australian rules footballer

- McCashney in May 1925

Personal information
- Full name: James Leonard McCashney
- Born: 30 December 1900; Trentham, Victoria
- Died: 26 May 1967 (aged 66); Malvern, Victoria
- Original team: Trentham
- Debut: Round 1, 1925, Hawthorn vs. Richmond, at Glenferrie Oval
- Height: 175 cm (5 ft 9 in)
- Weight: 73 kg (161 lb)
- Position: Wing

Playing career^{1}
Years	Club	Games (Goals)
1920–1924	Hawthorn (VFA)	88
1925–1927	Hawthorn	46 (7)
1929	Sandringham	15
- ^{1} Playing statistics correct to the end of 1929.

James Leonard McCashney (30 December 1900 – 26 May 1967) was an Australian rules footballer who played with Hawthorn in the Victorian Football League (VFL).

== Early life ==
McCashney was the youngest of ten children born to Henry William McCashney and Mary Anne Robson. McCashney's family owned a sawmill at Trentham and he commenced his football career playing with the Trentham club.

== Football career ==
In 1920 he joined Hawthorn, who were at that stage in the Victorian Football Association (VFA), and quickly cemented a place in the team, predominantly playing on the wing. McCashney was a member of Hawthorn's team for their first ever VFL game in 1925.

The Argus described his retirement after the 1927 VFL season: "McCashney, having taken unto himself a wife, has also retired. His record with the club has been remarkable. At one stage he played 106 games without a break, and then was stopped by accident. Altogether he played 134 games for Hawthorn. He was small but he was good, and his place will be missed."

In 1929 McCashney returned to football as the captain and coach of Sandringham Football Club in their first year in the VFA. He resigned for personal reasons towards the end of the season.

== Personal life ==
Jim McCashney married Rosie Margurita Merle Capuano on 7 March 1928 and they had two children together. Two of his brothers, John McCashney (South Melbourne) and Frank McCashney (Richmond), also played VFL football.

== Career outside football ==
Outside football, McCashney had a long and distinguished career within the Victorian Department of Agriculture. Commencing in 1917, he became an expert in milk supply and was instrumental in the introduction of milk pasteurization legislation in 1943. He became Assistant Secretary of the department in 1959 and then Secretary of the department in 1962 before his retirement in 1965.

Jim McCashney died on 26 May 1967 and was cremated at Springvale Botanical Cemetery.
