= Greg Sewell =

Australian football player (1933–2026)

Personal information
- Full name: Gregory George Sewell
- Born: 30 June 1933; Melbourne, Victoria, Australia
- Died: 22 July 2026 (aged 93); Melbourne, Victoria, Australia
- Original team: Monash Rovers
- Debut: 19 July 1952, Essendon vs. Footscray, at Windy Hill
- Height: 179 cm (5 ft 10 in)
- Weight: 75 kg (165 lb)
- Position: Wing

Playing career
Years	Club	Games (Goals)
1952–1961	Essendon	171 (34)

Coaching career
Years	Club	Games (W–L–D)
1962–1964	Kyneton	
1965	Essendon	1 (1–0–0)

Career highlights
- Victorian Interstate Team: 1957.; Essendon Football Club: Life Member 1961; Caretaker Coach Essendon Seniors: 1965; Assistant coach Essendon Seniors: 1965–1968; Assistant coach Senior Premiership Team: 1965; Assistant coach Senior Premiership Runners-up: 1968; Coach Essendon Reserves: 1965–1968; Coach Reserves Premiership Team: 1968; Essendon Football Club: Committeeman 1958–1961, 1969–1975; Essendon Football Club: Chairman of Selectors 1974–1975; Essendon Football Club: Vice-President 1976; Essendon Football Club: President 1981–1987; AFL Life Membership (for service to Australian Rules Football): 2001.; Inducted 'Legend of Essendon' in 2009.

Gregory George Sewell (30 June 1933 – 22 July 2026) was an Australian rules footballer, assistant coach and president for Essendon in the Victorian Football League (VFL). He was educated at University High School from 1950 to 1951, where he was a schoolmate of Allen Aylett. He was inducted as an Essendon legend for his contribution to the club which spanned over 4 decades.

== Recruit ==
Sewell was recruited by Essendon from a local side, the Monash Rovers. He was fast, marked well, and could break away from opponents. He played mainly as a wingman or as a half forward flanker; however, he finished his career as a back pocket player.

He played in the Thirds (under-19s) and the Seconds (Reserves) until he played his first senior match for Essendon on 19 July 1952, round 13 of the home-and-away season, against Footscray, at Essendon's home ground, Windy Hill.

Sewell played on the half-forward flank in the 1952 Essendon Seconds Premiership team that beat Collingwood Seconds 7.14 (56) to 4.5 (29).

== Career at Essendon ==
His senior record with Essendon included seven finals and two losing Grand Finals:

- 1952: 7 games.
- 1953: 19 games (including losing First Semi-Final team).
- 1954: 17 games, 1 goal.
- 1955: 19 games, 12 goals (including losing First Semi-Final team).
- 1956: 18 games, 2 goals.
- 1957: 18 games, 12 goals (including losing Grand Final team).

- 1957: one game for the Victorian Interstate Team.

- 1958: 18 games, 8 goals.
- 1959: 18 games (including losing Grand Final team), 10 goals.
- 1960: 19 games (including losing First Semi-Final team).
- 1961: 18 games.

== After Essendon ==
Sewell left Essendon at the end of 1961, — he was made a Life Member of the Essendon Football Club in 1961 — and went to play as captain-coach for the Kyneton Football Club in the Bendigo Football League from 1962 to 1964.

== Further life at Essendon ==
Sewell returned to Essendon in 1965 and, replacing Bill Hutchison, worked as both the Reserve Grade coach and the assistant Senior coach (to his mate John Coleman). He held those positions from 1965 to 1968.

The Essendon senior side, with Sewell as assistant coach, won the 1965 Premiership: Essendon 14.21 (105) to St Kilda 9.16 (70).

Whilst the Essendon senior side, again with Sewell as assistant coach, lost the 1968 Grand Final — Essendon 8.5 (53) to Carlton 7.14 (56) — Sewell finished his coaching career with a triumph. The Essendon Reserves won the Reserves Grand Final, beating Richmond 15.7 (97) to 13.14 (92), and won the first Reserve Grade Premiership for Essendon in sixteen years (i.e., since the 1952 Essendon Reserve Premiership team in which Sewell had played on the half-forward flank).

He also served on the Committee of the Essendon Football Club from 1958 to 1961, and from 1969 to 1975, as well as serving as its Vice-President in 1976, and its President from 1981 to 1987.

== After football ==
Sewell's family have been involved in the foundry business for three generations and Greg was for many years in control of Greg Sewell Forgings Pty Ltd. He was a good mate of John Coleman and was the last person at Essendon to see John Coleman alive.

In 2001, the Australian Football League bestowed a Life Membership on Sewell for his services to Australian Rules Football.

Sewell died on 22 July 2026, at the age of 93.

== See also ==
- List of presidents of the Essendon Football Club
- http://m.essendonfc.com.au/news/2009-03-18/legend-inducted
- http://www.kooriweb.org/foley/images/history/news/2000s/2007/age8apr2007.html
- https://web.archive.org/web/20160304030528/http://m.afl.com.au/news/2014-02-20/dominant-decades-of-the-sash-1980s
