= John McCashney (footballer, born 1884) =

Australian rules footballer

Personal information
- Full name: John Henry McCashney
- Born: 21 January 1884; Trentham, Victoria
- Died: 23 April 1952 (aged 68); Benalla
- Original team: Trentham
- Height: 177 cm (5 ft 10 in)
- Weight: 74 kg (163 lb)

Playing career^{1}
Years	Club	Games (Goals)
1903	South Melbourne	2 (0)
- ^{1} Playing statistics correct to the end of 1903.

John Henry McCashney (21 January 1884 – 23 April 1952) was an Australian rules footballer who played with South Melbourne in the Victorian Football League (VFL).

McCashney was the third of ten children born to Henry William McCashney and Mary Anne Robson. McCashney's family owned a sawmill at Trentham and he commenced his football career playing with the Trentham club. In 1903 he played two games towards the end of the season with South Melbourne. He also played football with the Kyneton Football Club. Two of his brothers, Frank McCashney (Richmond) and Jim McCashney (Hawthorn), also played VFL football.

He served in the Western Front in World War I, receiving severe injuries in June 1917 and returning home at the end of that year. He married Myrtle Veronica Thompson in 1922 and they lived in Benalla and had four children. He ran sawmills in the Toombullup and Mansfield districts up until his death in 1952.
