= Alan Thaw =

Australian rules footballer and coach

Personal information
- Full name: Alan Campbell Thaw
- Born: 17 January 1926; Flemington, Victoria
- Died: 22 February 2007 (aged 81)
- Original team: North Essendon Methodists
- Debut: Round 14, 1949, Essendon vs. St Kilda, at Windy Hill
- Height: 170 cm (5 ft 7 in)
- Weight: 76 kg (168 lb)

Playing career^{1}
Years	Club	Games (Goals)
1949–1954	Essendon	41 (0)

Coaching career
Years	Club	Games (W–L–D)
1959	Essendon	1 (1–0–0)
- ^{1} Playing statistics correct to the end of 1954.

Alan Campbell Thaw (17 January 1926 – 22 February 2007) was an Australian rules footballer who played for Essendon in the Victorian Football League.

Recruited locally, Thaw was a back pocket in Essendon's 1949 premiership side. He retired in 1954 and the following season was put in charge of the Reserves team, coaching them until 1959. In the 1959 VFL season he coached Essendon to a win over Fitzroy when Dick Reynolds was unavailable. From 1960 to 1976, Thaw was coach of Essendon's Under-19s and steered them to premierships in 1961 and 1966.

Prior to his football career, Thaw served in the Australian Army during the latter part of World War II.
