= Brian Paine =

Australian rules footballer

Personal information
- Full name: Brian Reginald Paine
- Born: 26 February 1932
- Died: 25 October 2016 (aged 84)
- Original team: Flemington CYMS (CYMSFA)
- Height: 179 cm (5 ft 10 in)
- Weight: 76 kg (168 lb)
- Position: Half-back

Playing career^{1}
Years	Club	Games (Goals)
1952	Essendon	1 (0)
- ^{1} Playing statistics correct to the end of 1952.

Brian Reginald Paine (26 February 1932 – 25 October 2016) was an Australian rules footballer who played with Essendon in the Victorian Football League (VFL). He later played for Yarraville in the Victorian Football Association (VFA).
