= Alby Law =

Australian rules footballer

Personal information
- Full name: Albert Reeves Law
- Born: 24 December 1929; Yallourn, Victoria, Australia
- Died: 17 May 1970 (aged 40); Moe, Victoria, Australia
- Original team: Moe
- Height: 175 cm (5 ft 9 in)
- Weight: 73 kg (161 lb)
- Position: Wingman

Playing career^{1}
Years	Club	Games (Goals)
1951–1953	Essendon	7 (1)
- ^{1} Playing statistics correct to the end of 1953.

Albert Reeves Law (24 December 1929 – 17 May 1970) was an Australian rules footballer who played for the Essendon Football Club in the Victorian Football League (VFL).

Law won a VFL reserves premiership for Essendon in 1952 before returning to his old side Moe in the Latrobe Valley Football League.

He later coached Moe's reserves and then seniors, leading the team to a senior premiership in 1967.

He was employed by the State Electricity Commission of Victoria.
