= Stan Booth =

Australian rules footballer and coach

Personal information
- Full name: Stanley Clarence Booth
- Born: 3 December 1933
- Died: 30 August 2007 (aged 73)
- Original team: Moonee Imperials
- Height: 173 cm (5 ft 8 in)
- Weight: 70 kg (154 lb)
- Position: Rover

Playing career^{1}
Years	Club	Games (Goals)
1952–1959	Essendon	102 (118)
- ^{1} Playing statistics correct to the end of 1959.

Stan Booth (3 December 1933 – 30 August 2007) was an Australian rules footballer who played with Essendon in the Victorian Football League (VFL) during the 1950s.

Booth was a rover and often rested on the half forward flank, contributing over a goal a game for Essendon. He spent most of the 1952 season in the reserves and was a member of their premiership team but also made five appearances in the seniors. From 1953 he was a regular in the Essendon side, kicking 32 goals in 1954 and playing in the 1957 Grand Final loss to Melbourne. Earlier in 1957, he was involved in some controversy when in a game against that year's premiers he was penalised for kicking the ball out of bounds deliberately, after a tackle from Ron Barassi. With just seconds remaining, Athol Webb kicked the winning goal from an angle on the half forward flank to give his team a one-point victory.

Once leaving Essendon, Booth moved to Tasmania and captain-coached the Sandy Bay Football Club from 1959 to 1961.
