= Ray Martini =

Australian rules footballer

Personal information
- Full name: Harold Raymond Martini
- Born: 14 July 1930 (age 96)
- Original team: Flemington
- Height: 180 cm (5 ft 11 in)
- Weight: 82.5 kg (182 lb)

Playing career^{1}
Years	Club	Games (Goals)
1950–52	Essendon	13 (1)
1953	Carlton	7 (0)
1954–55	Williamstown (VFA)	10 (6)
- ^{1} Playing statistics correct to the end of 1954.

Ray Martini (born 14 July 1930) is a former Australian rules footballer who played with Carlton and Essendon in the Victorian Football League (VFL).

== Family ==
Although there are suggestions that this "Martini" is the son of the former Geelong footballer, Percy Martini, the fact that Percy Martini's wife, May Victoria Martini (1887–1928), née Machar, died some two years before Ray Martini's birth, and that there's no record of Percy Martini ever remarrying (or, in contrast, being the father of an extra-marital child) seems to indicate that there's no substance to these claims.

== Football ==
=== Williamstown (VFA) ===
He played with Williamstown for two seasons: 1954 and 1955 totalling 10 senior games and kicking 6 goals.
