= Ian Monks =

Australian rules footballer

Personal information
- Full name: Ian Monks
- Born: 6 August 1931
- Died: 6 January 2009 (aged 77)
- Original team: Essendon High School Old Boys
- Height: 173 cm (5 ft 8 in)
- Weight: 67 kg (148 lb)
- Positions: Rover, wingman

Playing career^{1}
Years	Club	Games (Goals)
1953, 1955	Essendon	16 (19)
1956–57	South Melbourne	14 (7)
Total		30 (26)
- ^{1} Playing statistics correct to the end of 1957.

Ian Monks (6 August 1931 – 6 January 2009) was an Australian rules footballer who played with Essendon and South Melbourne in the Victorian Football League (VFL). He won a reserves premiership with Essendon in 1952. After his time in the VFL, he played for Port Melbourne and Caulfield in the Victorian Football Association (VFA).

Monks also had a long district cricket career for Essendon, playing 214 First XI games between 1949/50 and 1968/69, averaging 22.44 with the bat, and served as captain.

== See also ==
- 1965–66 Victorian district cricket final
