= Bob Taylor (Australian footballer) =

Australian rules footballer (1931–2026)

Personal information
- Full name: Robert William Taylor
- Born: 11 May 1931; Essendon, Victoria, Australia
- Died: 2 January 2026 (aged 94); Mornington, Victoria, Australia
- Original team: North Essendon Methodists
- Height: 179 cm (5 ft 10 in)
- Weight: 76 kg (168 lb)
- Position: Half-back flank

Playing career
Years	Club	Games (Goals)
1954–56	Essendon	34 (1)

Robert William Taylor (11 May 1931 – 2 January 2026) was an Australian rules footballer who played with Essendon in the Victorian Football League (VFL). Taylor died in Mornington, Victoria on 2 January 2026, at the age of 94.
