= Ken Reed (footballer) =

Australian rules footballer (1931–2018)

Personal information
- Full name: Kenneth John Reed
- Born: 15 December 1931
- Died: 19 July 2018 (aged 86)
- Original teams: East Brunswick, Carlton under-19s
- Height: 188 cm (6 ft 2 in)
- Weight: 75 kg (165 lb)
- Position: Follower

Playing career^{1}
Years	Club	Games (Goals)
1955	Essendon	2 (0)
- ^{1} Playing statistics correct to the end of 1955.

Kenneth John Reed (15 December 1931 - 19 July 2018) was an Australian rules footballer who played with Essendon in the Victorian Football League (VFL). He won a reserves premiership with Essendon in 1952 and a year later was awarded the reserves best and fairest. Reed later played for Williamstown in the Victorian Football Association and won two premierships with them, before concluding his career with Hastings.
