= Keith McIntosh =

Australian rules footballer (1928–2015)

Personal information
- Full name: Keith D. McIntosh
- Nickname: Mouse
- Born: 6 September 1928
- Died: 31 July 2015 (aged 86)
- Original team: Doutta Stars
- Height: 164 cm (5 ft 5 in)
- Weight: 63 kg (139 lb)
- Position: Wingman

Playing career^{1}
| Years | Club | Games (Goals) |
| 1951 | Essendon | 1 (0) |
- ^{1} Playing statistics correct to the end of 1951.

Keith McIntosh (6 September 1928 – 31 July 2015) was an Australian rules footballer who played with Essendon in the Victorian Football League (VFL). He won reserves premierships with Essendon in 1950 and 1952.
