= Windy Hill, Essendon =

Sports venue in Essendon, Victoria

Windy Hill
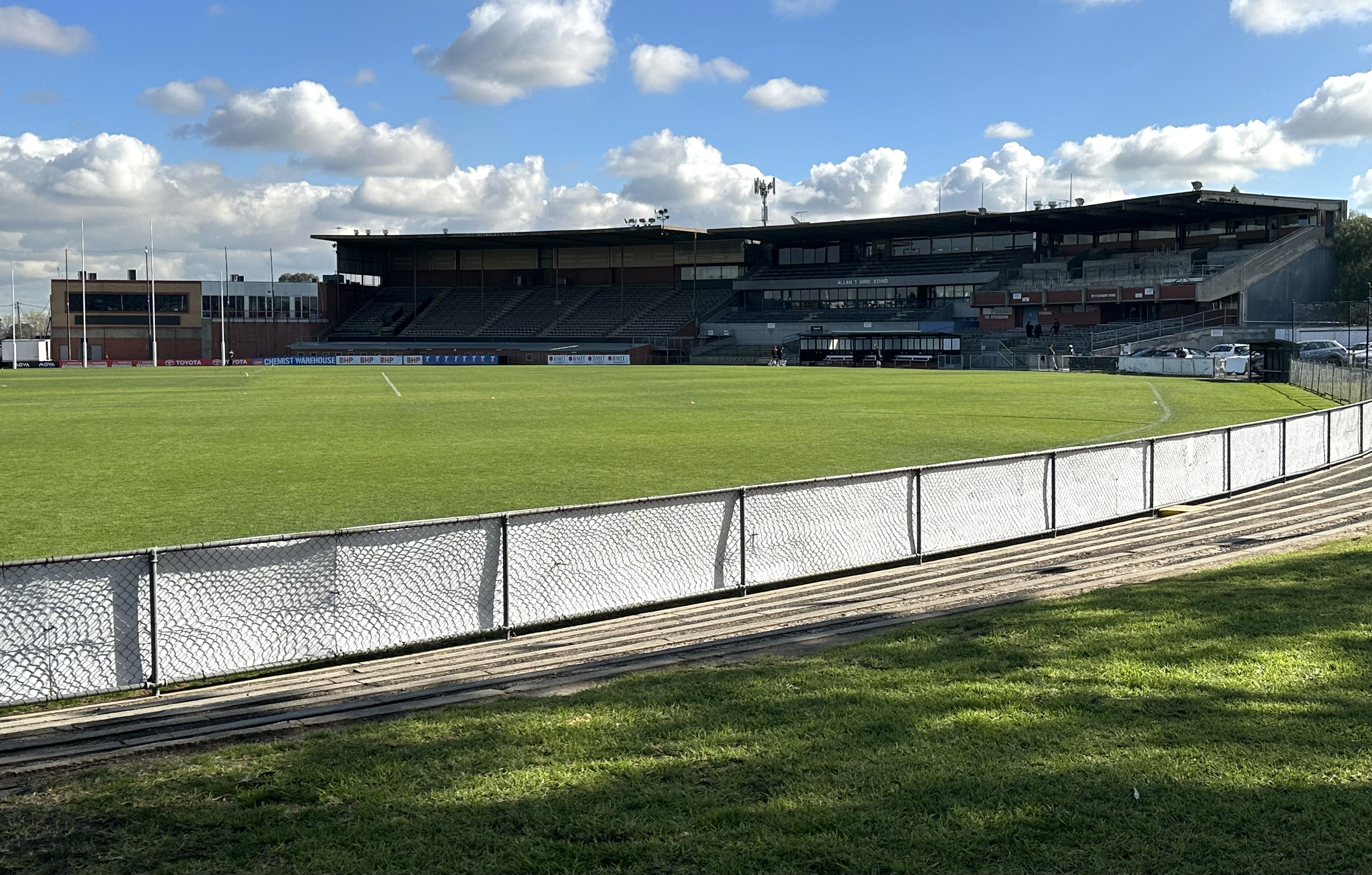
- Windy Hill in July 2026
- Interactive map of Windy Hill
- Former names: Essendon Cricket Ground
- Address: Napier St; Essendon, Victoria
- Coordinates: 37°45′7″S 144°55′11″E
- Capacity: 10,000
- Field size: 159 metres × 130 metres

Construction
- Opened: 1881; 145 years ago

Tenants
- Essendon Football Club; Administration and training (1922–2013); VFL/AFL (1922–1991); AFL Women's (2023–present); Essendon Cricket Club; Essendon reserves (VFL); Essendon Association (VFA, 1900–1921); Essendon Bowls Club; Essendon Croquet Club; Essendon District Football League

Windy Hill (officially known as Essendon Recreation Reserve) is an Australian rules football and cricket venue located in the Melbourne suburb of Essendon. It is synonymous with the Essendon Football Club in the Australian Football League (AFL), which used the ground for home matches from 1922 until 1991 and as its primary administrative and training base until 2013.

The venue is Essendon's current home venue for its AFL Women's (AFLW), Victorian Football League (VFL) and VFL Women's (VFLW) teams. It is also the current home venue of the Essendon Cricket Club in the Victorian Premier Cricket (VPC) competition.

== History ==
In the 1880s, the Essendon Recreation Reserve became the primary multi-purpose grassed sports reserve in Essendon. The Essendon Cricket Club was the ground manager and primary tenant, and played its cricket matches there during the summer. The Essendon Bowls Club was granted permissive occupancy of the south-western corner of the reserve in 1886. The reserve also contained a bicycle track, and was used by the Essendon District Football Club, which was a junior club, for its home games during the winter.

At this stage, the Essendon Football Club, which was playing top-level senior football in the Victorian Football Association, played at the East Melbourne Cricket Ground, approximately six miles away.

The demise of the Essendon District Football Club in 1897 left the ground vacant for other sports during the next three winters, including running and lacrosse. Football returned to the ground in 1900 with the establishment of the Essendon Town Football Club, which played in the Victorian Football Association. Over the following few years, the Essendon Croquet Club was established, and it built a court and club room in the north-eastern corner of the reserve.

In 1921, the East Melbourne Cricket Ground was closed, which forced the Essendon Football Club (at that time playing in the Victorian Football League) to find a new home. The council wanted the club to move to the Essendon Recreation Reserve, and committed to making £12,000 of improvements to the venue if the club did make the move, but the club thought it would have a better outcome if it moved to the Arden Street Oval in North Melbourne. Ultimately, after Essendon's move to North Melbourne was blocked by the state government following a protest from the VFA, which did not want to lose access to the Arden Street Oval, and Essendon moved to the Essendon Recreation Reserve. The Essendon Town club dropped out of the VFA and folded in December as a result of losing its home ground.

After this move, Essendon used the venue as its home ground for VFL/AFL matches for the next seventy years, from 1922 until 1991. Essendon played 628 matches at the venue, with a record of 418–201-9, for a winning percentage of 67.28%. The venue also hosted one neutral VFL match: a finals match between South Melbourne and Richmond during the 1924 VFL finals series. The record attendance was 43,487 for a match between Essendon and Collingwood in 1966.

The nickname "Windy Hill" for the ground was popularised in the mid-1950s by Lou Richards. Richards, a former Collingwood captain but by then a football columnist for The Sun News-Pictorial wrote his reviews in an expansive and humorous writing style and coined the term because of the ground's windy reputation. The nickname stuck and is in near-universal use to describe the ground – and often, by association, the Essendon Football Club itself.

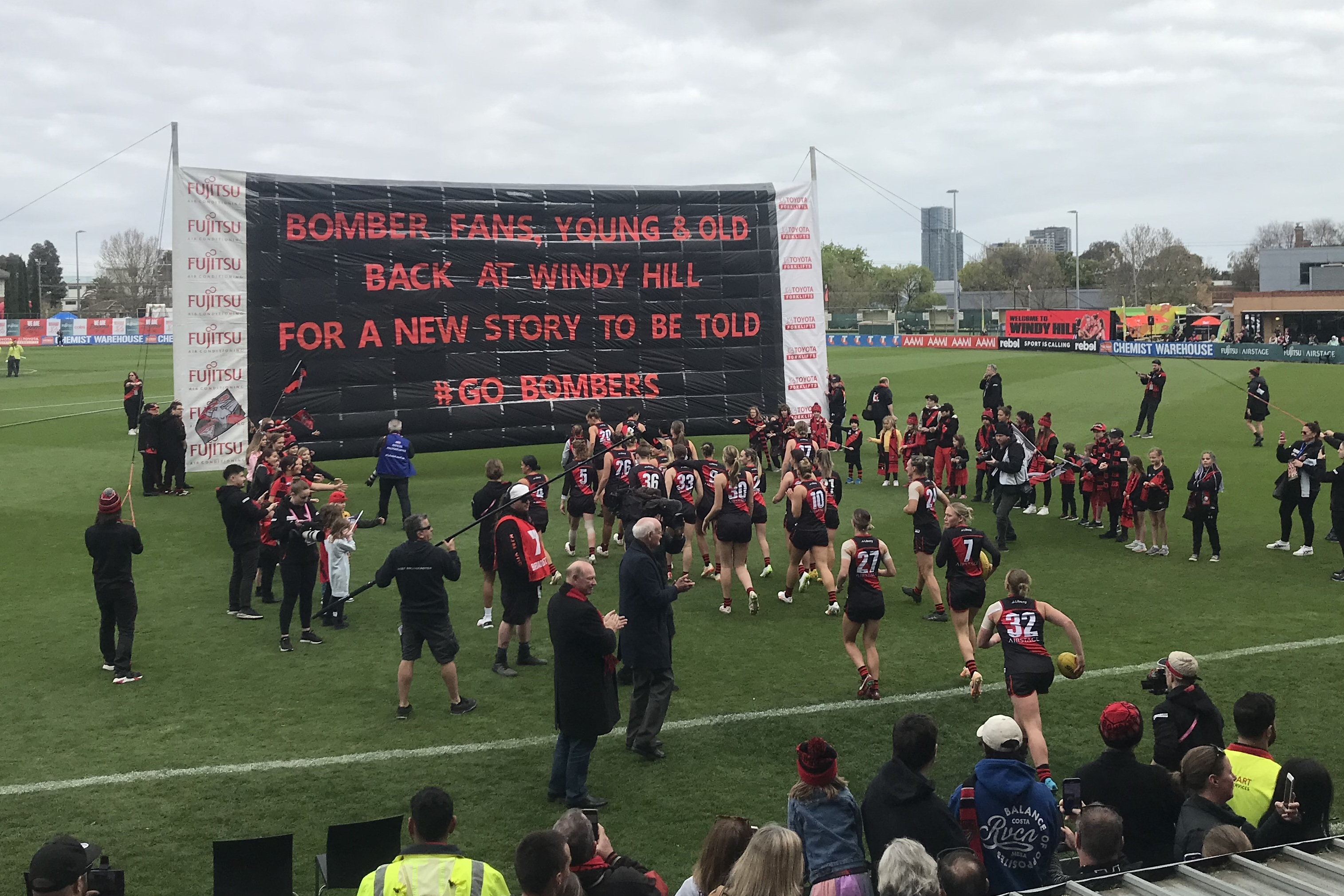
Essendon players take the field prior to its AFLW match against St Kilda; the match marked Essendon's first top-level match at its spiritual home since 1991.

In 1992, after a poll of members, the Essendon Football Club moved its home ground for matches from Windy Hill to the Melbourne Cricket Ground, but it retained Windy Hill as its training, administrative and social base. Over that time, the Essendon Cricket Club continued to use the venue for premier cricket matches in summer, and by the 2010/11 summer, Windy Hill was the last remaining venue still shared between an AFL club and a premier cricket club. Over time, some of the grandstands were demolished and some of the outer reclaimed.

In 2010, the Essendon Football Club sought an upgrade to its training facilities, and it elected to develop and entirely new facility in the suburb of Melbourne Airport. A major contributing factor was that the development at the new venue was not limited by size constraints which would have limited a redevelopment of Windy Hill; the club was also at the time in a well-publicised dispute with the Essendon Bowls Club, which was still the ground manager of its portion of Windy Hill and was unwilling to cede its territory to the football club's redevelopment, but the football club indicated that it would have made the move to Melbourne Airport regardless of the bowls club's position. Essendon signed a 37-year lease at Melbourne Airport, and moved its primary training and administrative base to the facility, known as The Hangar, in October 2013. Essendon still holds a lease at Windy Hill which will expire after 2031; the club uses the venue for home matches for its reserves team in the Victorian Football League, and maintains a social club and merchandise store on the site.

In November 2021, Essendon Football Club unveiled a redevelopment proposal for Windy Hill that would refurbish the grandstands and provide improved spectator and player facilities, and also allow the club's female teams to be permanently based at the venue. Community and professional sports facilities would be added, which would be utilised by the Essendon District Football League which plays many matches at the ground. The $50 million proposal has yet to commence. This proposal was shelved by the club in favour of a more moderate upgrade of crowd amenities, benches and team change-rooms, which was announced in October 2024 and is due for completion in 2026.

== Grandstands ==
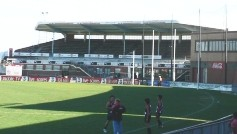
The A.F. Showers Stand in 2006, prior to its demolishment one year later

Windy Hill currently has three grandstands:

- R. S. Reynolds Stand – built when Essendon relocated from the East Melbourne Cricket Ground. It was originally known simply as the main grandstand; in April 1951, it was named in honour of the still active captain-coach Dick Reynolds, who had at that stage led the club to four premierships.
- Alan T. Hird Stand – opened in 1973, it houses the club's Social Club. Named after former club president and player Allan Hird, who was also the grandfather of club legend James Hird
- W. H. Cookson Stand – originally named the Memorial Stand, it was built in 1963. Was designed by Essendon player Jack Clarke.

Former stands and features included:

- W. R. Crichton Shelter – located on the southern wing, it was mainly terraced standing room with limited seats at the front. It was removed to make way for the Essendon Bowls Club, which had lost their greens with the construction of the leisure centre. Removed approximately 1994.
- A. F. Showers Pavilion – The ground included a significant heritage stand, the A.F. Showers Stand. Designed by Essendon architect Harry Winbush and built in 1939, it was the last major football stand to be built in Melbourne prior to World War II. After spending many years closed to the general public due to safety concerns, the Showers Stand was demolished in late 2007 to make way for more open space at the ground.
- W.G. Brew Scoreboard – located in the school end pocket, behind the croquet club. Was removed in the late 1990s along with the remainder of the outer and hill, which were reduced to about fence level around the school end of the ground.

== Playing days ==
During the days as Essendon's home ground, Windy Hill had the reputation of being a violent place for players, and was the site of several ugly incidents, The most famous of these was the "Battle of Windy Hill" (aka the Windy Hill Brawl or the Clash of the Sash), where a brawl broke out between players, team officials, trainers, spectators and police at half-time during a match between Essendon and Richmond on 18 May 1974. Another famous incident is when Hawthorn player Leigh Matthews broke the behind post after running into it during play in a 1982 game.

The dimensions of the grassed surface of the arena are 164.5 metres (180 yd) long and 139.8 metres (153 yd) wide (the playing field is slightly smaller after the boundary lines are marked). The long axis of the ground runs east to west.

== Windy Hill Fitness Centre ==
The Windy Hill Fitness Centre is a multipurpose aquatic facility and health club in Essendon, Victoria. The facility consists of an indoor 25m pool, spa, toddler play area, sauna, health club, group fitness studio, crèche, wellness studio, cycle/spin studio and personal training studio.

The facility was built by the Essendon Football Club for use by both the community and its players in 1995. The health club was originally built inside the old Showers Grand Stand which formed part of the Windy Hill Football Ground.

The health club was renovated in 2007 as part of a redevelopment by the Football Club with the Shower Stand demolished, and the new gym built next to where the Essendon Bowls Club once had a third green.
