= Bill Snell =

Australian rules footballer

Personal information
- Born: 23 March 1927
- Died: 18 March 2009 (aged 81)
- Original team: Mirboo North
- Debut: Round 1, 1950, Essendon vs. Fitzroy, at Brunswick Street
- Height: 185 cm (6 ft 1 in)
- Weight: 84 kg (185 lb)

Playing career^{1}
Years	Club	Games (Goals)
1950–52	Essendon	36 (16)
- ^{1} Playing statistics correct to the end of 1952.

William Snell (23 March 1927 – 18 March 2009) was an Australian rules footballer who played with Essendon in the VFL during the early 1950s.

A centre half forward, Snell made his debut in Dick Reynolds's 300th game. He was a member of Essendon's 1950 premiership team and also played in the side which lost the decider the following season. He suffered a serious head injury during a pre-season game before the 1951 season. Although doctors feared that he would never play football again, Snell returned to play the last eight games of the 1951 VFL season, including Essendon's loss to Geelong in the 1951 VFL Grand Final. He played a further eight games in 1952 before retiring from the VFL and going to coach the Stawell Football Club in 1953.
