= Brian Gilmore (footballer, born 1929) =

Australian rules footballer (1929–2024)

Personal information
- Full name: Brian R. Gilmore
- Born: 1 December 1929
- Died: 2 July 2024 (aged 94)
- Original team: Koondrook
- Height: 188 cm (6 ft 2 in)
- Weight: 86 kg (190 lb)

Playing career^{1}
Years	Club	Games (Goals)
1950–1953	Essendon	11 (2)
1955	St Kilda	10 (2)
Total		21 (4)
- ^{1} Playing statistics correct to the end of 1955.

Brian Rupert Gilmore (1 December 1929 – 2 July 2024) was an Australian rules footballer who played with Essendon and St Kilda in the Victorian Football League (VFL).

Gilmore was recruited from Koondrook, a town on the Victorian side of the Murray River. A follower, Gilmore started out in the seconds in 1949, then in 1950 broke into the seniors for the first time. He made 11 league appearances in his time at Essendon, never more than four in a single season and was a member of the club's 1950 and 1952 seconds premierships.

In 1954, Gilmore joined Richmond, where he played briefly in the seconds, before leaving for Kyneton.

He spent the 1955 VFL season with St Kilda and put together 10 games that year, all in succession, a run which ended when he was forced to sit out four weeks for striking Carlton's Noel O'Brien.

Also a professional runner, Gilmore competed in the Stawell Gift and once won the quarter mile race.

Gilmore died on 2 July 2024, at the age of 94.
