= Hugh Morris (Australian footballer) =

Australian rules footballer

Personal information
- Full name: Hugh Jackson Morris
- Born: 22 January 1932
- Died: 10 November 2013 (aged 81); Brighton, Victoria
- Original team: Essendon All Blacks
- Height: 182 cm (6 ft 0 in)
- Weight: 84 kg (185 lb)
- Position: Half-forward flank

Playing career^{1}
| Years | Club | Games (Goals) |
| 1952–54 | Essendon | 21 (2) |
| 1956 | St Kilda | 4 (0) |
| 1957–58 | Port Melbourne (VFA) | 9 (11) |
- ^{1} Playing statistics correct to the end of 1958.

Hugh Jackson Morris (22 January 1932 – 10 November 2013) was an Australian rules footballer who played with Essendon and St Kilda in the Victorian Football League (VFL). He was a premiership player with Essendon's reserves in 1952. Morris also played for Warracknabeal and Port Melbourne.

Morris initially worked as a police officer before founding his own security company.
