= Jack Knowles (footballer) =

Australian rules footballer

Personal information
- Born: 2 February 1932
- Died: 22 July 1996 (aged 64)
- Original team: Essendon Stars / Redan
- Height: 183 cm (6 ft 0 in)
- Weight: 81 kg (179 lb)

Playing career^{1}
Years	Club	Games (Goals)
1952–1958	Essendon	78 (0)
- ^{1} Playing statistics correct to the end of 1958.

Jack Knowles (2 February 1932 – 22 July 1996) was an Australian rules footballer in the Victorian Football League (VFL).

Jack Knowles was a full back pocket in the losing Essendon team against Melbourne in the 1957 VFL Grand Final.
