= List of VFL/AFL premiers =

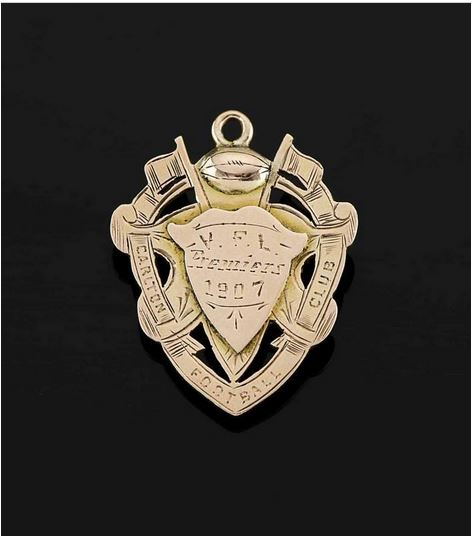
A premiership medal awarded to Norm Clark in 1907

This page is a complete chronological listing of VFL/AFL premiers. The Australian Football League (AFL), known as the Victorian Football League (VFL) until 1989, is the elite national competition in men's Australian rules football.

The inaugural premiership was awarded as a result of a round-robin finals system; this format was replaced after the first season, and a grand final has been held every season since 1898 to determine the premiers, with the exception of 1924 when a modified round-robin system was used. The formation of a national competition, beginning in 1987, has resulted in the league attempting to develop "an even and stable competition" through a range of equalisation policies, such as a salary cap and draft (introduced in 1985 and 1986, respectively). This has had a significant impact on the spread of premierships: since 1990, thirteen clubs have won a premiership, compared with only five clubs between 1967 and 1989.

Three clubs, Carlton, Collingwood and Essendon, have won the most VFL/AFL premierships, with 16 each. All teams currently competing in the AFL except Fremantle, Gold Coast and Greater Western Sydney (three of the four newest clubs) have won a premiership, and all except Gold Coast have played in a grand final.

== List of premiers ==
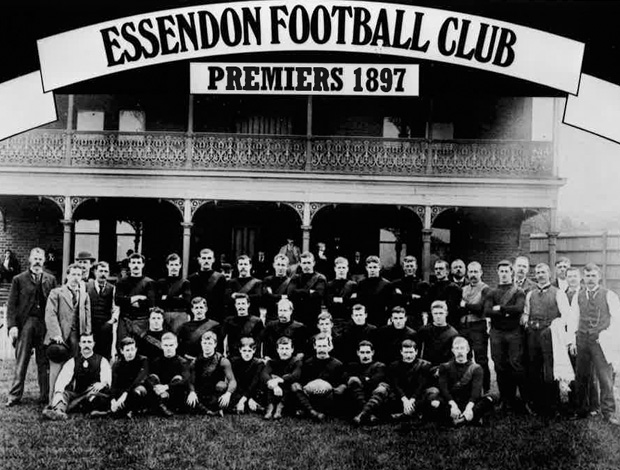
Essendon won the inaugural VFL premiership in 1897

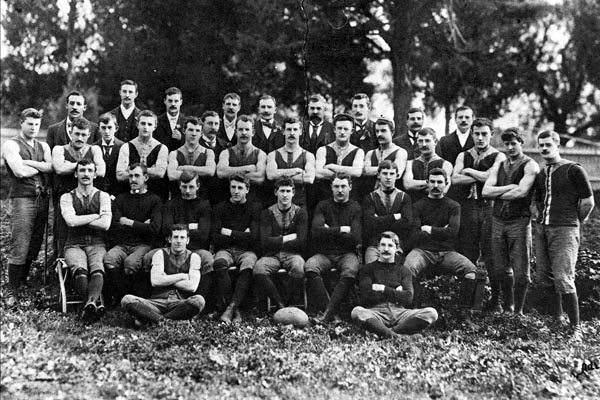
Fitzroy won the inaugural grand final in 1898

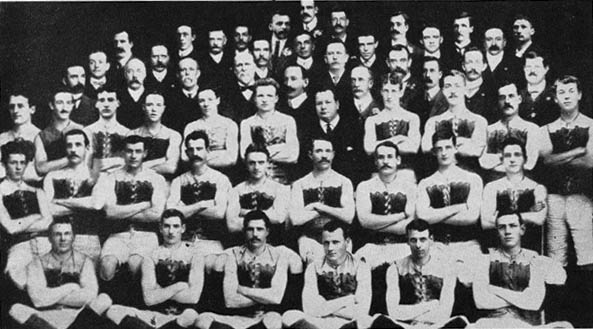
Carlton has won the equal-most premierships with 16, with their first coming in the 1906 season

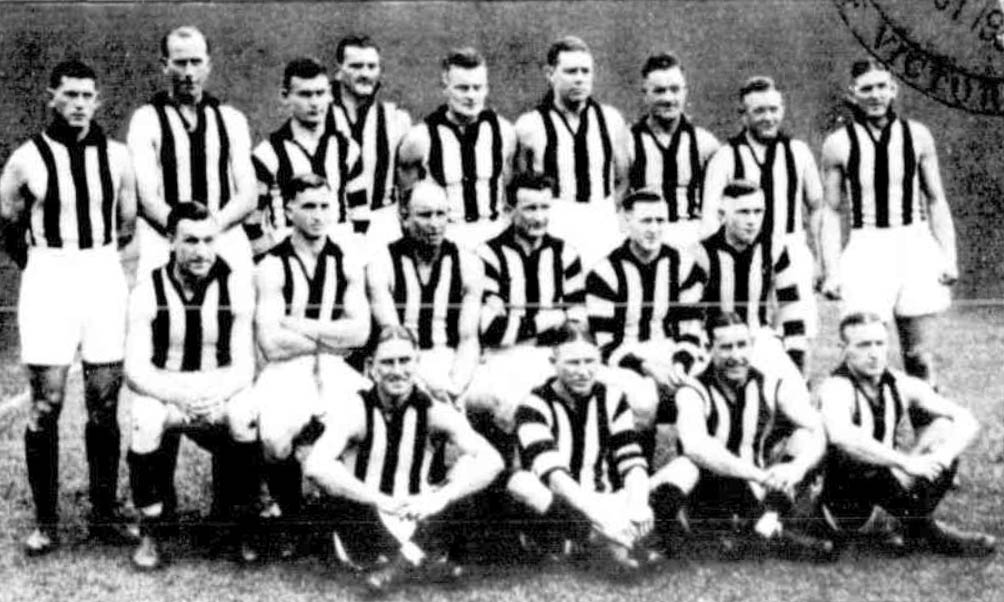
Collingwood's premiership win in 1930 was the club's fourth successive premiership, a record for the league

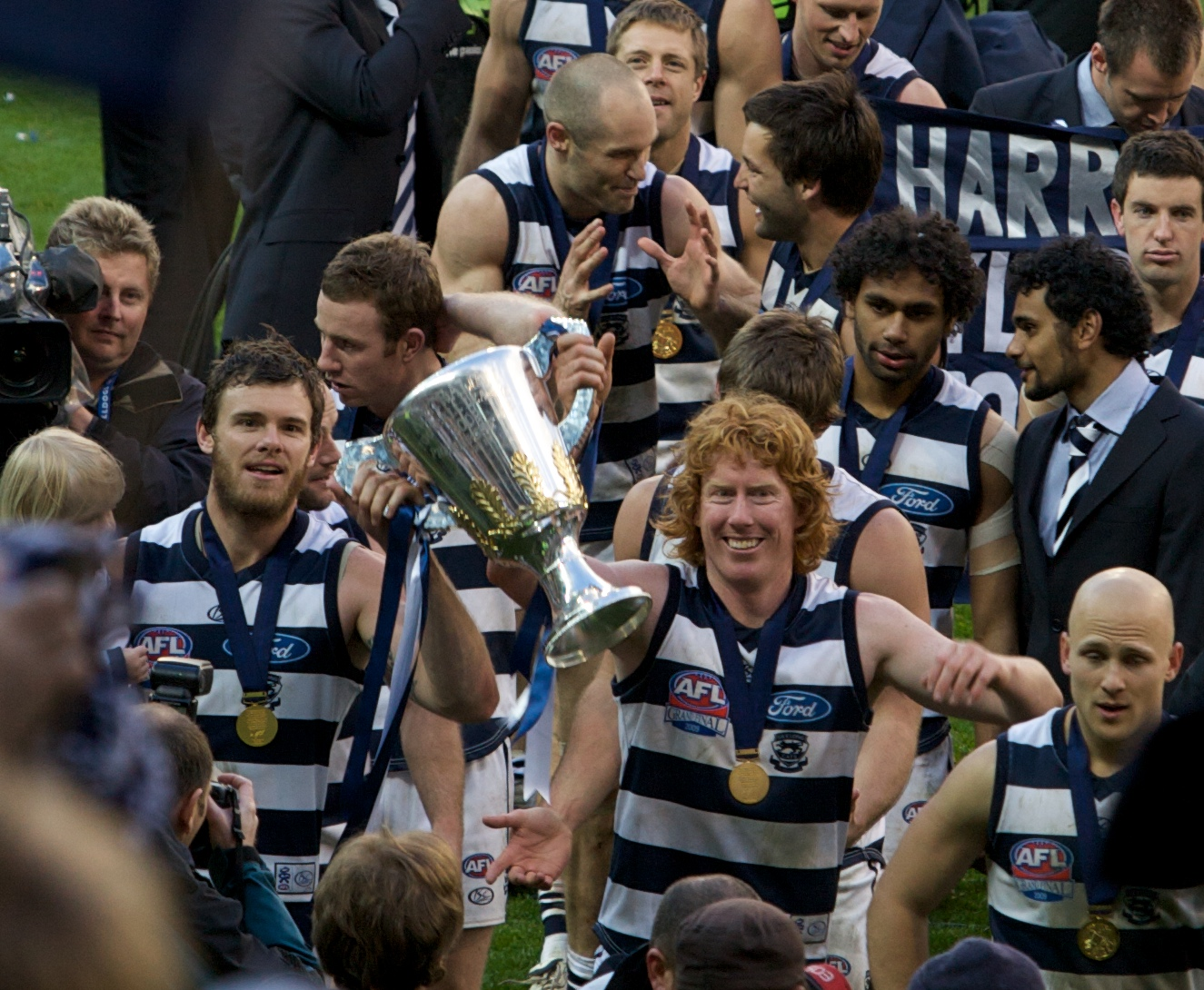
Geelong players doing a lap of honour with the premiership cup after their grand final win in 2009

| NF | Premiership decided without a grand final being required |
| CF | Premiership decided by a challenge final under the Argus finals system or similar |
| F | Premiership decided without a challenge final being required under the Argus finals system or similar^{[a]} |
| GF | Premiership decided by a conventional grand final, in which neither team had any right to challenge |
| GFD GFR | Premiership decided by a grand final replay, after the scheduled grand final was drawn |

| Year | Premiers | | Runners-up | | Type | Venue | Crowd | Date |
| | Club | Score | Club | Score | | Venue | Crowd | Date |
|---|---|---|---|---|---|---|---|---|
| 1897 | Essendon | | Geelong | | NF | | | |
| 1898 | Fitzroy | 5.8 (38) | Essendon | 3.5 (23) | CF | Junction Oval | 16,538 | 24 September 1898 |
| 1899 | Fitzroy (2) | 3.9 (27) | South Melbourne | 3.8 (26) | F | Junction Oval | 4,823 | 16 September 1899 |
| 1900 | Melbourne | 4.10 (34) | Fitzroy | 3.12 (30) | CF | East Melbourne Cricket Ground | 20,181 | 22 September 1900 |
| 1901 | Essendon (2) | 6.7 (43) | Collingwood | 2.4 (16) | GF | Lake Oval | 30,031 | 7 September 1901 |
| 1902 | Collingwood | 9.6 (60) | Essendon | 3.9 (27) | CF | MCG | 35,202 | 20 September 1902 |
| 1903 | Collingwood (2) | 4.7 (31) | Fitzroy | 3.11 (29) | GF | MCG | 32,263 | 12 September 1903 |
| 1904 | Fitzroy (3) | 9.7 (61) | Carlton | 5.7 (37) | F | MCG | 32,688 | 17 September 1904 |
| 1905 | Fitzroy (4) | 4.6 (30) | Collingwood | 2.5 (17) | CF | MCG | 30,000 | 30 September 1905 |
| 1906 | Carlton | 15.4 (94) | Fitzroy | 6.9 (45) | GF | MCG | 44,437 | 22 September 1906 |
| 1907 | Carlton (2) | 6.14 (50) | South Melbourne | 6.9 (45) | F | MCG | 45,477 | 21 September 1907 |
| 1908 | Carlton (3) | 5.5 (35) | Essendon | 3.8 (26) | F | MCG | 50,261 | 26 September 1908 |
| 1909 | South Melbourne | 4.14 (38) | Carlton | 4.12 (36) | CF | MCG | 37,759 | 2 October 1909 |
| 1910 | Collingwood (3) | 9.7 (61) | Carlton | 6.11 (47) | CF | MCG | 42,790 | 1 October 1910 |
| 1911 | Essendon (3) | 5.11 (41) | Collingwood | 4.11 (35) | F | MCG | 43,905 | 23 September 1911 |
| 1912 | Essendon (4) | 5.17 (47) | South Melbourne | 4.9 (33) | CF | MCG | 54,434 | 28 September 1912 |
| 1913 | Fitzroy (5) | 7.14 (56) | St Kilda | 5.13 (43) | CF | MCG | 59,556 | 27 September 1913 |
| 1914 | Carlton (4) | 6.9 (45) | South Melbourne | 4.15 (39) | CF | MCG | 30,495 | 26 September 1914 |
| 1915 | Carlton (5) | 11.12 (78) | Collingwood | 6.9 (45) | CF | MCG | 39,343 | 18 September 1915 |
| 1916 | Fitzroy (6) | 12.13 (85) | Carlton | 8.8 (56) | CF | MCG | 21,130 | 2 September 1916 |
| 1917 | Collingwood (4) | 9.20 (74) | Fitzroy | 5.9 (39) | CF | MCG | 25,512 | 22 September 1917 |
| 1918 | South Melbourne (2) | 9.8 (62) | Collingwood | 7.15 (57) | F | MCG | 39,262 | 7 September 1918 |
| 1919 | Collingwood (5) | 11.12 (78) | Richmond | 7.11 (53) | CF | MCG | 45,413 | 11 October 1919 |
| 1920 | Richmond | 7.10 (52) | Collingwood | 5.5 (35) | CF | MCG | 53,908 | 2 October 1920 |
| 1921 | Richmond (2) | 5.6 (36) | Carlton | 4.8 (32) | CF | MCG | 43,122 | 15 October 1921 |
| 1922 | Fitzroy (7) | 11.13 (79) | Collingwood | 9.14 (68) | CF | MCG | 50,054 | 14 October 1922 |
| 1923 | Essendon (5) | 8.15 (63) | Fitzroy | 6.10 (46) | CF | MCG | 46,566 | 20 October 1923 |
| 1924 | Essendon (6) | | Richmond | | NF | | | |
| 1925 | Geelong | 10.19 (79) | Collingwood | 9.15 (69) | CF | MCG | 64,288 | 10 October 1925 |
| 1926 | Melbourne (2) | 17.17 (119) | Collingwood | 9.8 (62) | CF | MCG | 59,632 | 9 October 1926 |
| 1927 | Collingwood (6) | 2.13 (25) | Richmond | 1.7 (13) | F | MCG | 34,551 | 1 October 1927 |
| 1928 | Collingwood (7) | 13.18 (96) | Richmond | 9.9 (63) | F | MCG | 50,026 | 29 September 1928 |
| 1929 | Collingwood (8) | 11.13 (79) | Richmond | 7.8 (50) | CF | MCG | 63,336 | 28 September 1929 |
| 1930 | Collingwood (9) | 14.16 (100) | Geelong | 9.16 (70) | CF | MCG | 45,022 | 11 October 1930 |
| 1931 | Geelong (2) | 9.14 (68) | Richmond | 7.6 (48) | GF | MCG | 60,712 | 10 October 1931 |
| 1932 | Richmond (3) | 13.14 (92) | Carlton | 12.11 (83) | GF | MCG | 69,724 | 1 October 1932 |
| 1933 | South Melbourne (3) | 9.17 (71) | Richmond | 4.5 (29) | GF | MCG | 75,754 | 30 September 1933 |
| 1934 | Richmond (4) | 19.14 (128) | South Melbourne | 12.17 (89) | GF | MCG | 65,335 | 13 October 1934 |
| 1935 | Collingwood (10) | 11.12 (78) | South Melbourne | 7.16 (58) | GF | MCG | 54,154 | 5 October 1935 |
| 1936 | Collingwood (11) | 11.23 (89) | South Melbourne | 10.18 (78) | GF | MCG | 74,091 | 3 October 1936 |
| 1937 | Geelong (3) | 18.14 (122) | Collingwood | 12.18 (90) | GF | MCG | 88,540 | 25 September 1937 |
| 1938 | Carlton (6) | 15.10 (100) | Collingwood | 13.7 (85) | GF | MCG | 96,486 | 24 September 1938 |
| 1939 | Melbourne (3) | 21.22 (148) | Collingwood | 14.11 (95) | GF | MCG | 78,110 | 30 September 1939 |
| 1940 | Melbourne (4) | 15.17 (107) | Richmond | 10.8 (68) | GF | MCG | 70,330 | 28 September 1940 |
| 1941 | Melbourne (5) | 19.13 (127) | Essendon | 13.20 (98) | GF | MCG | 79,687 | 27 September 1941 |
| 1942 | Essendon (7) | 19.18 (132) | Richmond | 11.13 (79) | GF | Princes Park | 49,000 | 19 September 1942 |
| 1943 | Richmond (5) | 12.14 (86) | Essendon | 11.15 (81) | GF | Princes Park | 42,100 | 25 September 1943 |
| 1944 | Fitzroy (8) | 9.12 (66) | Richmond | 7.9 (51) | GF | Junction Oval | 43,000 | 30 September 1944 |
| 1945 | Carlton (7) | 15.13 (103) | South Melbourne | 10.15 (75) | GF | Princes Park | 62,986 | 29 September 1945 |
| 1946 | Essendon (8) | 22.18 (150) | Melbourne | 13.9 (87) | GF | MCG | 73,743 | 5 October 1946 |
| 1947 | Carlton (8) | 13.8 (86) | Essendon | 11.19 (85) | GF | MCG | 85,815 | 27 September 1947 |
| 1948 | Melbourne (6) | 10.9 (69) | Essendon | 7.27 (69) | GFD | MCG | 85,658 | 2 October 1948 |
| 1948 | Melbourne (6) | 13.11 (89) | Essendon | 7.8 (50) | GFR | MCG | 52,226 | 9 October 1948 |
| 1949 | Essendon (9) | 18.17 (125) | Carlton | 6.16 (52) | GF | MCG | 90,453 | 24 September 1949 |
| 1950 | Essendon (10) | 13.14 (92) | North Melbourne | 7.12 (54) | GF | MCG | 87,601 | 23 September 1950 |
| 1951 | Geelong (4) | 11.15 (81) | Essendon | 10.10 (70) | GF | MCG | 84,109 | 29 September 1951 |
| 1952 | Geelong (5) | 13.8 (86) | Collingwood | 5.10 (40) | GF | MCG | 81,304 | 27 September 1952 |
| 1953 | Collingwood (12) | 11.11 (77) | Geelong | 8.17 (65) | GF | MCG | 89,060 | 26 September 1953 |
| 1954 | Footscray | 15.12 (102) | Melbourne | 7.9 (51) | GF | MCG | 80,897 | 25 September 1954 |
| 1955 | Melbourne (7) | 8.16 (64) | Collingwood | 5.6 (36) | GF | MCG | 88,053 | 17 September 1955 |
| 1956 | Melbourne (8) | 17.19 (121) | Collingwood | 6.12 (48) | GF | MCG | 115,803 | 15 September 1956 |
| 1957 | Melbourne (9) | 17.14 (116) | Essendon | 7.13 (55) | GF | MCG | 100,324 | 21 September 1957 |
| 1958 | Collingwood (13) | 12.10 (82) | Melbourne | 9.10 (64) | GF | MCG | 97,956 | 20 September 1958 |
| 1959 | Melbourne (10) | 17.13 (115) | Essendon | 11.12 (78) | GF | MCG | 103,506 | 26 September 1959 |
| 1960 | Melbourne (11) | 8.14 (62) | Collingwood | 2.2 (14) | GF | MCG | 97,457 | 24 September 1960 |
| 1961 | Hawthorn | 13.16 (94) | Footscray | 7.9 (51) | GF | MCG | 107,935 | 23 September 1961 |
| 1962 | Essendon (11) | 13.12 (90) | Carlton | 8.10 (58) | GF | MCG | 98,385 | 29 September 1962 |
| 1963 | Geelong (6) | 15.19 (109) | Hawthorn | 8.12 (60) | GF | MCG | 101,452 | 5 October 1963 |
| 1964 | Melbourne (12) | 8.16 (64) | Collingwood | 8.12 (60) | GF | MCG | 102,469 | 19 September 1964 |
| 1965 | Essendon (12) | 14.21 (105) | St Kilda | 9.16 (70) | GF | MCG | 104,846 | 25 September 1965 |
| 1966 | St Kilda | 10.14 (74) | Collingwood | 10.13 (73) | GF | MCG | 101,655 | 24 September 1966 |
| 1967 | Richmond (6) | 16.18 (114) | Geelong | 15.15 (105) | GF | MCG | 109,396 | 23 September 1967 |
| 1968 | Carlton (9) | 7.14 (56) | Essendon | 8.5 (53) | GF | MCG | 116,828 | 28 September 1968 |
| 1969 | Richmond (7) | 12.13 (85) | Carlton | 8.12 (60) | GF | MCG | 119,165 | 27 September 1969 |
| 1970 | Carlton (10) | 17.9 (111) | Collingwood | 14.17 (101) | GF | MCG | 121,696 | 26 September 1970 |
| 1971 | Hawthorn (2) | 12.10 (82) | St Kilda | 11.9 (75) | GF | MCG | 118,192 | 25 September 1971 |
| 1972 | Carlton (11) | 28.9 (177) | Richmond | 22.18 (150) | GF | MCG | 112,393 | 7 October 1972 |
| 1973 | Richmond (8) | 16.20 (116) | Carlton | 12.14 (86) | GF | MCG | 116,956 | 29 September 1973 |
| 1974 | Richmond (9) | 18.20 (128) | North Melbourne | 13.9 (87) | GF | MCG | 113,839 | 28 September 1974 |
| 1975 | North Melbourne | 19.8 (122) | Hawthorn | 9.13 (67) | GF | MCG | 110,551 | 27 September 1975 |
| 1976 | Hawthorn (3) | 13.22 (100) | North Melbourne | 10.10 (70) | GF | MCG | 110,143 | 25 September 1976 |
| 1977 | North Melbourne (2) | 9.22 (76) | Collingwood | 10.16 (76) | GFD | MCG | 108,224 | 24 September 1977 |
| 1977 | North Melbourne (2) | 21.25 (151) | Collingwood | 19.10 (124) | GFR | MCG | 98,366 | 1 October 1977 |
| 1978 | Hawthorn (4) | 18.13 (121) | North Melbourne | 15.13 (103) | GF | MCG | 101,704 | 30 September 1978 |
| 1979 | Carlton (12) | 11.16 (82) | Collingwood | 11.11 (77) | GF | MCG | 113,545 | 29 September 1979 |
| 1980 | Richmond (10) | 23.21 (159) | Collingwood | 9.24 (78) | GF | MCG | 113,461 | 27 September 1980 |
| 1981 | Carlton (13) | 12.20 (92) | Collingwood | 10.12 (72) | GF | MCG | 112,964 | 26 September 1981 |
| 1982 | Carlton (14) | 14.19 (103) | Richmond | 12.13 (85) | GF | MCG | 107,537 | 25 September 1982 |
| 1983 | Hawthorn (5) | 20.20 (140) | Essendon | 8.9 (57) | GF | MCG | 110,332 | 24 September 1983 |
| 1984 | Essendon (13) | 14.21 (105) | Hawthorn | 12.9 (81) | GF | MCG | 92,685 | 29 September 1984 |
| 1985 | Essendon (14) | 26.14 (170) | Hawthorn | 14.8 (92) | GF | MCG | 100,042 | 28 September 1985 |
| 1986 | Hawthorn (6) | 16.14 (110) | Carlton | 9.14 (68) | GF | MCG | 101,861 | 27 September 1986 |
| 1987 | Carlton (15) | 15.14 (104) | Hawthorn | 9.17 (71) | GF | MCG | 92,754 | 26 September 1987 |
| 1988 | Hawthorn (7) | 22.20 (152) | Melbourne | 6.20 (56) | GF | MCG | 93,754 | 24 September 1988 |
| 1989 | Hawthorn (8) | 21.18 (144) | Geelong | 21.12 (138) | GF | MCG | 94,796 | 30 September 1989 |
Australian Football League name adopted
| 1990 | Collingwood (14) | 13.11 (89) | Essendon | 5.11 (41) | GF | MCG | 98,944 | 6 October 1990 |
| 1991 | Hawthorn (9) | 20.19 (139) | West Coast | 13.8 (86) | GF | VFL Park | 75,230 | 28 September 1991 |
| 1992 | West Coast | 16.17 (113) | Geelong | 12.13 (85) | GF | MCG | 95,007 | 26 September 1992 |
| 1993 | Essendon (15) | 20.13 (133) | Carlton | 13.11 (89) | GF | MCG | 96,862 | 25 September 1993 |
| 1994 | West Coast (2) | 20.23 (143) | Geelong | 8.15 (63) | GF | MCG | 93,860 | 1 October 1994 |
| 1995 | Carlton (16) | 21.15 (141) | Geelong | 11.14 (80) | GF | MCG | 93,670 | 30 September 1995 |
| 1996 | North Melbourne (3) | 19.17 (131) | Sydney | 13.10 (88) | GF | MCG | 93,102 | 28 September 1996 |
| 1997 | Adelaide | 19.11 (125) | St Kilda | 13.16 (94) | GF | MCG | 99,645 | 27 September 1997 |
| 1998 | Adelaide (2) | 15.15 (105) | North Melbourne | 8.22 (70) | GF | MCG | 94,431 | 26 September 1998 |
| 1999 | Kangaroos (4) | 19.10 (124) | Carlton | 12.17 (89) | GF | MCG | 94,228 | 25 September 1999 |
| 2000 | Essendon (16) | 19.21 (135) | Melbourne | 11.9 (75) | GF | MCG | 96,249 | 2 September 2000 |
| 2001 | Brisbane Lions | 15.18 (108) | Essendon | 12.10 (82) | GF | MCG | 91,482 | 29 September 2001 |
| 2002 | Brisbane Lions (2) | 10.15 (75) | Collingwood | 9.12 (66) | GF | MCG | 91,817 | 28 September 2002 |
| 2003 | Brisbane Lions (3) | 20.14 (134) | Collingwood | 12.12 (84) | GF | MCG | 79,451 | 27 September 2003 |
| 2004 | Port Adelaide | 17.11 (113) | Brisbane Lions | 10.13 (73) | GF | MCG | 77,671 | 25 September 2004 |
| 2005 | Sydney (4) | 8.10 (58) | West Coast | 7.12 (54) | GF | MCG | 91,828 | 24 September 2005 |
| 2006 | West Coast (3) | 12.13 (85) | Sydney | 12.12 (84) | GF | MCG | 97,431 | 30 September 2006 |
| 2007 | Geelong (7) | 24.19 (163) | Port Adelaide | 6.8 (44) | GF | MCG | 97,302 | 29 September 2007 |
| 2008 | Hawthorn (10) | 18.7 (115) | Geelong | 11.23 (89) | GF | MCG | 100,012 | 27 September 2008 |
| 2009 | Geelong (8) | 12.8 (80) | St Kilda | 9.14 (68) | GF | MCG | 99,251 | 26 September 2009 |
| 2010 | Collingwood (15) | 9.14 (68) | St Kilda | 10.8 (68) | GFD | MCG | 100,016 | 25 September 2010 |
| 2010 | Collingwood (15) | 16.12 (108) | St Kilda | 7.10 (52) | GFR | MCG | 93,853 | 2 October 2010 |
| 2011 | Geelong (9) | 18.11 (119) | Collingwood | 12.9 (81) | GF | MCG | 99,537 | 1 October 2011 |
| 2012 | Sydney (5) | 14.7 (91) | Hawthorn | 11.15 (81) | GF | MCG | 99,683 | 29 September 2012 |
| 2013 | Hawthorn (11) | 11.11 (77) | Fremantle | 8.14 (62) | GF | MCG | 100,007 | 28 September 2013 |
| 2014 | Hawthorn (12) | 21.11 (137) | Sydney | 11.8 (74) | GF | MCG | 99,454 | 27 September 2014 |
| 2015 | Hawthorn (13) | 16.11 (107) | West Coast | 8.13 (61) | GF | MCG | 98,633 | 3 October 2015 |
| 2016 | Western Bulldogs (2) | 13.11 (89) | Sydney | 10.7 (67) | GF | MCG | 99,981 | 1 October 2016 |
| 2017 | Richmond (11) | 16.12 (108) | Adelaide | 8.12 (60) | GF | MCG | 100,021 | 30 September 2017 |
| 2018 | West Coast (4) | 11.13 (79) | Collingwood | 11.8 (74) | GF | MCG | 100,022 | 29 September 2018 |
| 2019 | Richmond (12) | 17.12 (114) | Greater Western Sydney | 3.7 (25) | GF | MCG | 100,014 | 28 September 2019 |
| 2020 | Richmond (13) | 12.9 (81) | Geelong | 7.8 (50) | GF | The Gabba | 29,707 | 24 October 2020 |
| 2021 | Melbourne (13) | 21.14 (140) | Western Bulldogs | 10.6 (66) | GF | Optus Stadium | 61,118 | 25 September 2021 |
| 2022 | Geelong (10) | 20.13 (133) | Sydney | 8.4 (52) | GF | MCG | 100,024 | 24 September 2022 |
| 2023 | Collingwood (16) | 12.18 (90) | Brisbane Lions | 13.8 (86) | GF | MCG | 100,024 | 30 September 2023 |
| 2024 | Brisbane Lions (4) | 18.12 (120) | Sydney | 9.6 (60) | GF | MCG | 100,013 | 28 September 2024 |
| 2025 | Brisbane Lions (5) | 18.14 (122) | Geelong | 11.9 (75) | GF | MCG | 100,022 | 27 September 2025 |
| 2026 | Brisbane Lions (6) | 14.12 (96) | Fremantle | 12.17 (89) | GF | MCG | 100,023 | 26 September 2026 |

== Premierships by club ==
| Club | Years | Premierships | | Runners-up | |
| Club | Years | Total | Season(s) | Total | Season(s) |
|---|---|---|---|---|---|
| Collingwood | 1897–present | 16 | 1902, 1903, 1910, 1917, 1919, 1927, 1928, 1929, 1930, 1935, 1936, 1953, 1958, 1990, 2010, 2023 | 27 | 1901, 1905, 1911, 1915, 1918, 1920, 1922, 1925, 1926, 1937, 1938, 1939, 1952, 1955, 1956, 1960, 1964, 1966, 1970, 1977, 1979, 1980, 1981, 2002, 2003, 2011, 2018 |
| Essendon | 1897–present | 16 | 1897, 1901, 1911, 1912, 1923, 1924, 1942, 1946, 1949, 1950, 1962, 1965, 1984, 1985, 1993, 2000 | 14 | 1898, 1902, 1908, 1941, 1943, 1947, 1948, 1951, 1957, 1959, 1968, 1983, 1990, 2001 |
| Carlton | 1897–present | 16 | 1906, 1907, 1908, 1914, 1915, 1938, 1945, 1947, 1968, 1970, 1972, 1979, 1981, 1982, 1987, 1995 | 13 | 1904, 1909, 1910, 1916, 1921, 1932, 1949, 1962, 1969, 1973, 1986, 1993, 1999 |
| Richmond | 1908–present | 13 | 1920, 1921, 1932, 1934, 1943, 1967, 1969, 1973, 1974, 1980, 2017, 2019, 2020 | 12 | 1919, 1924, 1927, 1928, 1929, 1931, 1933, 1940, 1942, 1944, 1972, 1982 |
| Hawthorn | 1925–present | 13 | 1961, 1971, 1976, 1978, 1983, 1986, 1988, 1989, 1991, 2008, 2013, 2014, 2015 | 6 | 1963, 1975, 1984, 1985, 1987, 2012 |
| Melbourne | 1897–present | 13 | 1900, 1926, 1939, 1940, 1941, 1948, 1955, 1956, 1957, 1959, 1960, 1964, 2021 | 5 | 1946, 1954, 1958, 1988, 2000 |
| Geelong | 1897–present | 10 | 1925, 1931, 1937, 1951, 1952, 1963, 2007, 2009, 2011, 2022 | 11 | 1897, 1930, 1953, 1967, 1989, 1992, 1994, 1995, 2008, 2020, 2025 |
| Fitzroy | 1897–1996 | 8 | 1898, 1899, 1904, 1905, 1913, 1916, 1922, 1944 | 5 | 1900, 1903, 1906, 1917, 1923 |
| Brisbane Lions | 1997–present | 6 | 2001, 2002, 2003, 2024, 2025, 2026 | 2 | 2004, 2023 |
| South Melbourne/Sydney^{[b]} | 1897–present | 5 | 1909, 1918, 1933, 2005, 2012 | 14 | 1899, 1907, 1912, 1914, 1934, 1935, 1936, 1945, 1996, 2006, 2014, 2016, 2022, 2024 |
| North Melbourne/Kangaroos^{[c]} | 1925–present | 4 | 1975, 1977, 1996, 1999 | 5 | 1950, 1974, 1976, 1978, 1998 |
| West Coast | 1987–present | 4 | 1992, 1994, 2006, 2018 | 3 | 1991, 2005, 2015 |
| Footscray/Western Bulldogs^{[d]} | 1925–present | 2 | 1954, 2016 | 2 | 1961, 2021 |
| Adelaide | 1991–present | 2 | 1997, 1998 | 1 | 2017 |
| St Kilda | 1897–present | 1 | 1966 | 6 | 1913, 1965, 1971, 1997, 2009, 2010 |
| Port Adelaide | 1997–present | 1 | 2004 | 1 | 2007 |
| Fremantle | 1995–present | 0 | —N/a | 2 | 2013, 2026 |
| Greater Western Sydney | 2012–present | 0 | —N/a | 1 | 2019 |
| Gold Coast | 2011–present | 0 | —N/a | 0 | —N/a |
| University | 1908–1914 | 0 | —N/a | 0 | —N/a |
| Brisbane Bears | 1987–1996 | 0 | —N/a | 0 | —N/a |

== Minor grade premierships ==
In addition to the seniors, VFL/AFL clubs have competed in premierships in three minor grades.

=== Night premierships ===
The pre-season and night premiership covers three competitions which are considered historically equivalent in status:

- VFL night series, a consolation competition played amongst non-finalists between 1956 and 1971, and again in 1977, 1978 and 1987.
- Australian Football Championships night series, a mid-season knock-out competition played concurrently with the premiership and involving teams from interstate, played between 1979 and 1986.
- VFL/AFL pre-season competition, played before each season from 1988 until 2013.

=== Seconds/reserves premierships ===
The reserve grade premiership was held in various formats between 1919 and 1999. It was known as the Victorian Junior Football League from 1919 until 1923, the Seconds from 1924 until 1959, the VFL Reserves from 1960 until 1989, and as the AFL reserves from 1990 until 1999. Until 1991, the competition was run by the VFL/AFL, and from 1992 until 1999 it was administered by the Victorian State Football League.

=== Thirds/under-19s premierships ===
The VFL/AFL under-19s competition was held between 1946 and 1991. It was known as the VFL thirds from 1946 until 1959, and as the under-19s from 1960 until 1991.

- 1946: North Melbourne
- 1947: Melbourne
- 1948: Carlton
- 1949: Carlton (2)
- 1950: Essendon
- 1951: Carlton (3)
- 1952: Essendon (2)
- 1953: Melbourne (2)
- 1954: Footscray
- 1955: Fitzroy
- 1956: South Melbourne
- 1957: St Kilda
- 1958: Richmond
- 1959: Essendon (3)
- 1960: Collingwood
- 1961: Essendon (4)
- 1962: Geelong
- 1963: Carlton (4)
- 1964: Melbourne (3)
- 1965: Collingwood (2)
- 1966: Essendon (5)
- 1967: Richmond (2)
- 1968: Richmond (3)
- 1969: Richmond (4)
- 1970: Richmond (5)
- 1971: Melbourne (4)
- 1972: Hawthorn
- 1973: Richmond (6)
- 1974: Collingwood (3)
- 1975: Richmond (7)
- 1976: North Melbourne (2)
- 1977: Richmond (8)
- 1978: Carlton (5)
- 1979: Carlton (6)
- 1980: Richmond (9)
- 1981: Melbourne (5)
- 1982: Fitzroy (2)
- 1983: Melbourne (6)
- 1984: North Melbourne (3)
- 1985: Richmond (10)
- 1986: Collingwood (4)
- 1987: North Melbourne (4)
- 1988: North Melbourne (5)
- 1989: Richmond (11)
- 1990: North Melbourne (6)
- 1991: North Melbourne (7)

== See also ==
- AFL Grand Final
- List of AFL Women's premiers
- List of VFL/AFL pre-season and night series premiers
- List of VFL/AFL premiership captains and coaches
- List of VFL/AFL wooden spoons

== Notes ==
- ^{a} In these cases, had the other team won the match, a rematch would have been played the following weekend.
- ^{b} Sydney was known as South Melbourne prior to relocation in 1982.
- ^{c} North Melbourne was known simply as the Kangaroos from 1999 to 2007.
- ^{d} Western Bulldogs was known as Footscray prior to 1997.

== Sources ==
- Australian Football League
- Full Points Footy
- AFL Tables
