= TAA (disambiguation) =

TAA stands for Trans Australia Airlines that later became part of Qantas.

TAA or Taa may also refer to:

== Biology and medicine ==
- Tumor associated antigen
- Trimeric Autotransporter Adhesins, in biology, a gram-negative outer membrane virulence factor
- Tachyarrhythmia absoluta, a form of cardiac arrhythmia
- TAA, a stop codon in molecular biology
- Thoracic aortic aneurysm

== Organizations ==
- Tanganyika African Association
- Tanzania Airports Authority
- Teaching Assistants Association, a graduate student union at University of Wisconsin–Madison
- Tourette Association of America (formerly Tourette Syndrome Association)
- Turkistanian American Association

== Other uses ==
- Taa, a Khoisan language of southern Africa
- TAA (football club), a team representing Trans Australia Airlines in the VFL thirds in 1949
- Ṭāʼ or Teth, a letter of the Arabic abjad
- Tactical asset allocation, an investment strategy
- The Amity Affliction, an Australian post-hardcore band
- Trade Adjustment Assistance, a US program to help workers displaced by trade
- Trade Agreements Act of 1979, a United States statute
- Trent Alexander-Arnold (born 1998), English professional footballer
- Tribes: Aerial Assault, an online video game for PlayStation 2
- Taa, the fictional home world of the Marvel Comics character Galactus
- Temporal anti-aliasing, a computer graphics algorithm
- tert-Amyl alcohol, a colorless liquid
- TSX (or Transactional) Asynchronous Abort, a type of speculative execution CPU vulnerability

== See also ==
- TAAS (disambiguation)
