= 1949 VFL thirds season =

4th season of the Victorian Football League thirds competition

- Date: April – 11 September
- Teams: 12
- Premiers: Carlton; 2nd premiership
- Minor premiers: Geelong; 1st minor premiership

The 1949 VFL thirds season was the 4th season of the VFL thirds, the Australian rules football competition operating as the junior competition to the Victorian Football League (VFL).

Carlton won their second thirds premiership, defeating minor premiers Geelong by 11 points.

At the end of the previous season, North Essendon withdrew from the competition, and TAA − a side representing Trans Australia Airlines − took its place. However, the side was too heavily beaten and withdrew after round 4.

== Ladder ==
The demise of TAA meant most teams had an extra game counted in the standings. Hawthorn, Melbourne, North Melbourne and St Kilda − who all played and defeated TAA − remained at 16 games.

Pos	Team	Pld	W	L	D	PP	Pts
1	Geelong	17	14	3	0	165.6	56
2	South Melbourne	17	14	3	0	132.8	56
3	Carlton (P)	17	13	4	0	176.5	52
4	Melbourne	16	12	4	0	120.8	48
5	Richmond	17	11	6	0	111.1	44
6	Essendon	17	9	8	0	120.2	36
7	Footscray	17	7	9	0	108.9	28
8	Fitzroy	17	7	9	0	74.2	28
9	St Kilda	16	4	12	0	65.6	16
10	North Melbourne	16	4	12	0	57.8	16
11	Hawthorn	16	4	12	0	36.6	16
−	TAA	4	0	4	0		0

== Finals series ==
=== Grand final ===
	Grand final
Saturday, 11 September	Carlton 9.8 (62)	def.	Geelong 7.9 (51)	Princes Park
