= 1950 VFL thirds season =

5th season of the Victorian Football League thirds competition

- Date: 22 April – September
- Teams: 12
- Premiers: Essendon; 1st premiership
- Minor premiers: Essendon; 2nd minor premiership

The 1950 VFL thirds season was the 5th season of the VFL thirds, the Australian rules football competition operating as the junior competition to the Victorian Football League (VFL).

Essendon won their first thirds premiership, defeating reigning premiers Carlton by 1 point.

Following the demise of TAA after four rounds in the previous season, Richmond chose to enter a second team into the competition − known as Richmond Juniors. It lasted for one season, and was replaced by Collingwood in 1951.

== Ladder ==
A round 8 game between Richmond Juniors and Melbourne, scheduled to be held on 10 June, was postponed (and later cancelled) due to the condition of the respective grounds. Both teams were awarded two points each.

| Pos | Team | Pld | W | L | D | PF | PA | PP | Pts |
|---|---|---|---|---|---|---|---|---|---|
| 1 | Essendon (P) | 15 | 15 | 0 | 0 | 1079 | 462 | 233.5 | 60 |
| 2 | Carlton | 15 | 12 | 3 | 0 | 1191 | 463 | 257.2 | 48 |
| 3 | South Melbourne | 15 | 12 | 3 | 0 | 1051 | 554 | 189.7 | 48 |
| 4 | North Melbourne | 15 | 9 | 5 | 1 | 754 | 658 | 114.6 | 38 |
| 5 | Richmond | 15 | 9 | 6 | 0 | 751 | 668 | 112.4 | 36 |
| 6 | Footscray | 15 | 9 | 6 | 0 | 723 | 694 | 104.2 | 36 |
| 7 | Melbourne | 14 | 6 | 7 | 1 | 598 | 793 | 75.4 | 28 |
| 8 | Geelong | 15 | 5 | 10 | 0 | 693 | 795 | 87.2 | 20 |
| 9 | Hawthorn | 15 | 4 | 11 | 0 | 529 | 890 | 59.4 | 16 |
| 10 | Fitzroy | 15 | 3 | 11 | 1 | 576 | 956 | 60.3 | 14 |
| 11 | Richmond Juniors | 14 | 2 | 12 | 0 | 458 | 1032 | 44.4 | 10 |
| 12 | St Kilda | 15 | 1 | 13 | 1 | 465 | 903 | 51.5 | 6 |

Rules for classification: 1) points; 2) percentage; 3) number of points for

== Finals series ==
=== Grand Final ===
Five minutes before the end of the match, scores were level. It was not until the last minute that Essendon, with a behind that almost missed, won the game.

| | 1950 VFL thirds Grand Final |
| Saturday, 6 September | Essendon 6.5 (41) | def. | Carlton 5.10 (40) |
