= Uzbek Americans =

Americans of Uzbek birth or descent

Uzbeks in America
Total population
- 53,374 (by ancestry or ethnic origin; US census in 2020); 74,967 (Uzbekistan-born, 2023)

Regions with significant populations
- New York metropolitan area, New Jersey, and Philadelphia; also in Pittsburgh, Cleveland, Chicago, San Antonio, Houston, and Los Angeles

Languages
- English; Uzbek; Russian; Tajik

Religion
- Islam, Judaism, Orthodox Christianity

Related ethnic groups
- Mainly those who are of mixed origin and those of Samarkand and Bukhara.

Uzbek Americans (Uzbek: Amerikalik oʻzbeklar) are Americans of Uzbek descent as well as non-Uzbek former citizens of Uzbekistan. The community also includes those who have dual American and Uzbek citizenship.

== History ==
Uzbek families have migrated to the United States since the late 1950s, primarily to the New York metropolitan area. The first Uzbek families came from Eastern Europe, but from the mid-1960s they mainly came from Turkey and, to a lesser extent, Turkmenistan, Saudi Arabia, and elsewhere.

According to statistics collected by the US Department of State's Bureau of Consular Affairs, 56,028 families won visas through the DV lottery program between 1996–2016.

A wave of Uzbek immigrants to the United States settled in the country in the 1980s, because of the Soviet invasion of Afghanistan. From the early 1990s to the present day, most of the Uzbeks who migrate go to the US.

== Demography ==
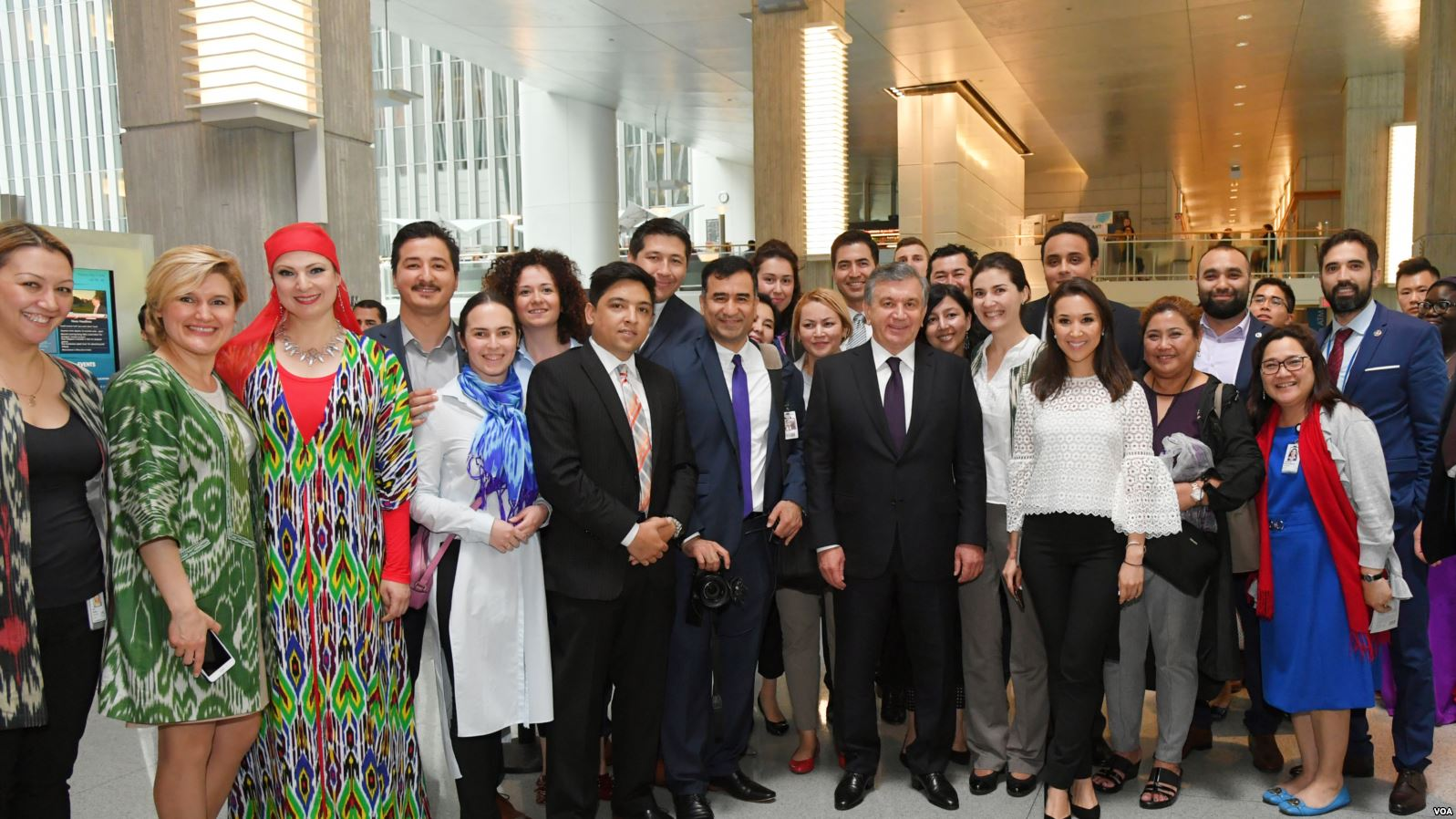
Uzbek President Shavkat Mirziyoyev with members of the Uzbek diaspora in New York City, home to more than half of all Uzbek Americans, most settling in Queens or Brooklyn.

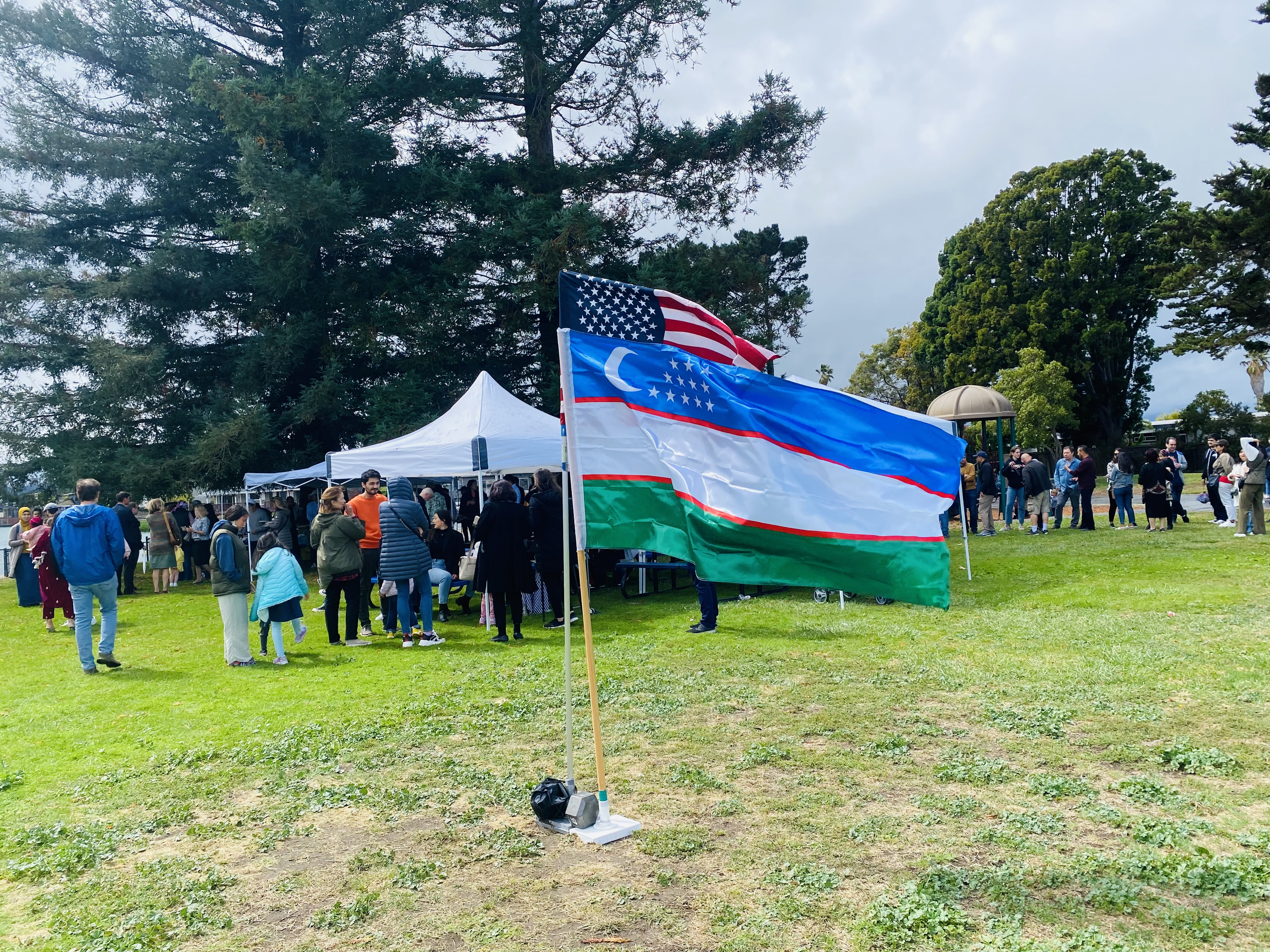
2022 Uzbek Culture Festival in Foster City, California

Every year, around 6,000–7,800 Uzbeks immigrate to the United States. More than 20,000 ethnic Uzbeks are citizens of the United States today. The greater percentages of Uzbeks live mainly in New York, Philadelphia, and New Jersey, growing rapidly in populations particularly in the boroughs of Brooklyn and Queens in New York City and in Northern New Jersey. However, smaller pockets of Uzbek Americans can be found in other major American metropolitan areas, such as San Antonio, Houston, Chicago, Cleveland, and Pittsburgh. 2012 and 2013 had the largest migration of Uzbeks to the United States in history, much more so than the 1,000–1,800 green card lottery winners that were originally set in place. The neighborhood of Forest Hills, Queens has the largest number of Bukharan Jews in the United States.

Other Uzbek populations are most centered in Texas. San Antonio and Houston have the largest Uzbek populations in Texas. Most Uzbek migrants are engaged in business and science, working in various institutions and companies. Part of the Uzbek diaspora is involved in government offices, schools, and colleges of the country, as well as in areas like defense, aviation and medicine. Some representatives of the Uzbek diaspora hold senior executive positions in a number of American states.

== Organizations ==
As with other ethnic groups in the United States, Uzbek Americans also have several cultural associations. The Central Asian Foundation, established in July 2015, is a non-profit organization that promotes the social welfare of its members by developing and fostering cultural and social awareness and relations between the American and Central Asian communities in the United States.

On December 13, 1958, the Turkistanian American Association (ATA) was formed in Philadelphia, which joined the citizens of the former Soviet Turkestan living in United States, taking advantage the growing number of immigrants in the United States of Central Asian origin. Under federal law, the US first registered the Association in Philadelphia and, later (in 1961), it was recorded in New York.

== Notable people ==
- Jacob Arabo – American designer (born 1965)
- Lola Astanova – Uzbek-born American pianist
- Lucy Dacus – American singer-songwriter (born 1995)
- Arthur Kaliyev – Uzbekistani-American ice hockey player (born 2001)
- Timur Kocaoğlu – American and Turkish historian and political scientist
- Ilia Malinin – American figure skater (born 2004) – American figure skater
- Sylvia Nasar – American journalist (born 1947)
- Nazif Shahrani – Professor at Indiana University Bloomington, U.S.
- Alik Sakharov – film and television director
- Alexei Sultanov – Uzbek and American pianist (1969-2005)
- Milana Vayntrub – American actress and comedian (born 1987)
- Rita Volk – American actress

== See also ==
- Central Asian Americans
- Uzbekistan-United States relations
