= TAA (football club) =

Australian rules football club

Names
- Full name: Trans Australia Airlines

1949 season
- Home-and-away season: − (0−4)

Club details
- Founded: 1949; 76 years ago
- Dissolved: 1949; 76 years ago
- Competition: VFL thirds (1949)

Uniforms
Home

TAA was an Australian rules football club that competed in a single season of the VFL thirds, the junior competition to the Victorian Football League (VFL). The team represented Trans Australia Airlines (TAA).

Following the demise of North Essendon, which competed in the 1947 and 1948 seasons, TAA was brought in to take its place.

However, the side was beaten heavily, and withdrew from the competition following round 4 of the 1949 season. After leaving the thirds competition, TAA played and was defeated by a side representing Australian National Airways in a one-off match in August 1949. TAA disbanded shortly after this time.

== Club records ==
=== 1949 VFL thirds season ===
- Round 1 − North Melbourne 23.24 (162) def. TAA 1.1 (7)
- Round 2 − Hawthorn 11.22 (88) def. TAA 1.2 (8)
- Round 3 − Melbourne def. TAA
- Round 4 − Richmond 27.17 (159) def. TAA 2.1 (13)
