= TAAS =

TAAS may refer to:

- Israel Military Industries, also referred to as Taas (Hebrew: תע"ש), an Israeli weapons manufacturer
- Ta'as, an abbreviation of the Hebrew for "Military Industry" (Hebrew: Ta'asiya Tzvait), the clandestine arms industry of the Jewish settlement in Mandate Palestine
- Taipei Adventist American School, a school in Taipei, Taiwan
- Texas Assessment of Academic Skills, (TAAS), a standardized test used in Texas between 1991 and 2002
- These Arms Are Snakes, an American band
- The Air Ambulance Service, a British charity who operate air ambulances
- Trimeric autotransporter adhesins (TAAs), proteins found on the outer membrane of Gram-negative bacteria
- Transportation as a Service (TaaS)

== See also ==
- TAA (disambiguation)
- Zee 24 Taas, a 24-hour Marathi news channel
