= 1991 AFL under-19s season =

45th season of the Australian Football League under-19s competition

- Date: 23 March – September
- Teams: 12
- Premiers: North Melbourne; 7th premiership
- Minor premiers: Collingwood

The 1991 AFL under-19s season was the 45th and final season of the AFL under-19s competition, the Australian rules football competition operating as the junior competition to the Australian Football League (AFL).

North Melbourne won their 7th under-19s premiership and their second in a row, defeating Collingwood by 38 points at VFL Park.

At the end of the season, the under-19s was disbanded and a new competition − called the TAC Cup − began in 1992 with teams that were not linked to AFL clubs.

== Ladder ==
Pos	Team	Pld	W	L	D	PP	Pts
1	Collingwood	22	17	5	0	179.6	68
2	North Melbourne (P)	22	16	6	0	154.1	64
3	Hawthorn	22	16	6	0	153.3	64
4	Essendon	22	14	7	1	118.9	58
5	Melbourne	22	13	8	1	125.7	54
6	Richmond	22	13	9	0	118.7	52
7	Sydney	22	12	10	0	120.5	48
8	Carlton	22	10	12	0	68.9	40
9	Fitzroy	22	6	16	0	75.1	24
10	St Kilda	22	6	16	0	55.9	24
11	Geelong	22	5	17	0	69.6	20
12	Footscray	22	3	19	0	52.6	12

== Finals series ==
=== Grand final ===
Grand final
Collingwood 8.13 (61)	def. by	North Melbourne 14.15 (91)	VFL Park
