= Osman Kocaoğlu =

- Usmonxoʻja Poʻlatxoʻjayev
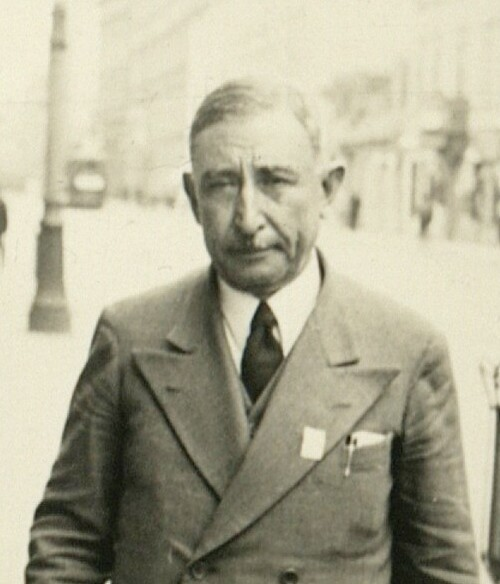
- Kocaoğlu in 1938
- Pronunciation: Polat Usmon Khodzhayev
- Born: 1878; Osh
- Died: 1968 (aged 89–90)
- Burial place: Özbekler Tekkesi (Istanbul)
- Citizenship: Emirate of Bukhara; Bukharan People's Soviet Republic; Turkey
- Occupations: Teacher; Journalist; Politician
- Spouse(s): Fatima (first marriage); Hakime Kocaoğlu
- Children: Timur Kocaoğlu; Also two sons and a daughter from his first marriage and several more children from his second marriage.

Osman Kocaoğlu (Polat Usmon Khodzhayev; 1878–1968) was the first president (Chairman of the Presidium of the Central Executive Committee) of the former Bukharan People's Soviet Republic. Although his name was romanized as Polat Usman Khodzhayev in Russian, he spent most of his life in Turkey and Osman Kocaoğlu is the name he assumed in Turkey.

== Life ==
He was born 1878. His father was an itinerant dealer and during his youth he travelled with his father around Bukhara. Although his early training was in madrasa, he later on chose modern education. He was under the influence of Jadid and Yaş Bukhara movement (modernists). He founded a school. In 1918 he was one of the leaders of Yaş Bukhara movement. Bukhara Khanate was a vassal state of the Russian Empire. During Russian Revolution Yaş Bukhara movement in which both the nationalists and the Bolsheviks participated, tried to depose Alim Khan. But they were not successful. Following a split in the movement they finally deposed Alim Khan in 1920. On 23 September 1921 Osman Kocaoğlu was elected as the president of the Bukharan People's Soviet Republic. But his term was short. He was sent to eastern Bukhara and started to collaborate with the Basmachi movement.

The Bolsheviks became aware of his supporting the Basmachi movement and his term ended on 12 April 1922. He fled Bukhara and in Afghanistan, on behalf of the Bukharan SSR, he signed an agreement with Amanullah Khan and the Emirate of Afghanistan on a joint fight against Bolshevik Russia. In Afghanistan, he tried to buy weapons from various countries for the army of the Bukhara Republic and opponents of the Bolsheviks, and in particular contacted representatives of the British Empire. After a while, he finally emigrated to Afghanistan, and became one of the leaders of emigrants and refugees from the former Emirate of Bukhara and the rest of Central Asia. He travelled to Turkey in 1923.

== Later life ==
According to some accounts during his brief service in Bukhara Republic, he was instrumental in supporting the Turkish War of Independence (1919-1922) financially, using the funds of an historical treasure of the Bukhara. This aid was delivered by the Soviet government. However beginning by his stay in Turkey, he abandoned politics and concentrated on historiography. He wrote in the bulletin Yeni Turkistan ("New Turkestan") published by Zeki Velidi Togan. During the Second World War he travelled to Poland and Iran. After the war he returned to Turkey and died in 1968.

He was laid to rest in Üsküdar district of Istanbul.
