= 1948 VFL thirds season =

3rd season of the Victorian Football League thirds competition

- Date: May – 11 September
- Teams: 11
- Premiers: Carlton; 1st premiership
- Minor premiers: Essendon; 1st minor premiership

The 1948 VFL thirds season was the 3rd season of the VFL thirds, the Australian rules football competition operating as the junior competition to the Victorian Football League (VFL).

Carlton won their first thirds premiership, defeating minor premiers Essendon by 10 points.

This was the first season contested by Footscray. At the end of the season, North Essendon left the competition and were replaced by TAA, a team representing Trans Australia Airlines.

== Ladder ==
| Pos | Team | Pld | W | L | D | PP | Pts |
|---|---|---|---|---|---|---|---|
| 1 | Essendon | 17 | 16 | 0 | 1 | 229.8 | 66 |
| 2 | Geelong | 17 | 15 | 2 | 0 | 207.3 | 60 |
| 3 | Carlton (P) | 17 | 14 | 3 | 0 | 230.4 | 56 |
| 4 | Richmond | 17 | 12 | 5 | 0 | 155.6 | 48 |
| 5 | Melbourne | 17 | 9 | 8 | 0 | 154.9 | 36 |
| 6 | Footscray | 17 | 9 | 8 | 0 | 81.4 | 36 |
| 7 | South Melbourne | 17 | 7 | 10 | 0 | 94.9 | 28 |
| 8 | Fitzroy | 17 | 7 | 10 | 0 | 73.2 | 28 |
| 9 | Hawthorn | 17 | 5 | 11 | 1 | 72.2 | 22 |
| 10 | North Melbourne | 17 | 4 | 3 | 0 | | 16 |
| 11 | North Essendon | 17 | 2 | 15 | 0 | 28.6 | 8 |
| 12 | St Kilda | 17 | 1 | 16 | 0 | 29.6 | 4 |

== Finals series ==
=== Grand final ===
| | Grand final |
| Saturday, 11 September | Carlton 6.10 (46) | def. | Essendon 5.6 (36) | Arden Street Oval |
