= AFL under-19s =

- Formerly: VFL thirds VFL under-19s
- Sport: Australian rules football
- Founded: 1946
- First season: 1946
- Folded: 1991
- No. of teams: 12 (final season)
- Country: Australia
- Most titles: Richmond (11)
- Related competitions: AFL Seniors; AFL reserves

The AFL under-19s was an Australian rules football competition that operated as a junior competition to the Australian Football League (AFL) from 1946 until the end of 1991.

Prior to 1990, it was known as the VFL thirds or VFL under-19s.

== History ==
In 1946, the Victorian Football League (VFL) introduced a thirds competition for under-19s players. Initially, only 7 clubs competed − Carlton, Essendon, Hawthorn, Melbourne, North Melbourne, Richmond and St Kilda. Several VFL clubs already operated thirds teams in local competitions, while others were affiliated with existing junior clubs.

In 1947, the VFL invited the Doutta Stars Football Club (which competed in the Essendon District Football League) to field a side in the Thirds; the team was known as North Essendon. The side was unsuccessful, and after two seasons a team representing Trans Australia Airlines (TAA) took its place. However, TAA were beaten too heavily, and withdrew from the competition following round 4 of the 1949 season.

By 1950, all VFL clubs (bar Collingwood) were now in the thirds competition. Richmond chose to enter a second team − known as Richmond Juniors. The new side competed for a single season, and Collingwood joined the competition in 1951.

The competition became known as the VFL under-19s beginning in 1960 − a name that continued until the VFL was renamed to the AFL in 1990.

With the focus of the VFL/AFL moving rapidly towards a national competition, the former metropolitan and country zoning recruitment system for the Victorian VFL/AFL clubs was abolished, and the league's under-19 competition was shut down at the end of 1991. A new competition, called the TAC Cup, began in 1992 with teams that were not linked to AFL clubs.

== Clubs ==
Twelve clubs competed in the competition's final season No teams from Queensland, South Australia or Western Australia ever competed in the competition.

Club	Colours	Moniker	First season	Last season	Title(s)	Year(s) of Title(s)	Current league							
Club	Colours	Moniker	First season	Last season	Title(s)	Year(s) of Title(s)	Current league	Carlton	Blues	1946	1991	6	1948, 1949, 1951, 1963, 1978, 1979	In recess
Collingwood		Magpies	1951	1991	4	1960, 1965, 1974, 1986	In recess							
Essendon		Bombers	1946	1991	5	1950, 1952, 1959, 1961, 1966	In recess							
Fitzroy		Lions	1947	1991	2	1955, 1982	VAFA U19s							
Footscray		Bulldogs	1948	1991	1	1954	In recess							
Geelong		Cats	1947	1991	1	1962	In recess							
Hawthorn		Hawks	1946	1991	1	1972	In recess							
Melbourne		Demons	1946	1991	6	1947, 1953, 1964, 1971, 1981, 1983	In recess							
North Essendon		Stars	1947	1948	0	−	EDFL U18s							
North Melbourne		Kangaroos	1946	1991	7	1946, 1976, 1984, 1987, 1988, 1990, 1991	In recess							
Richmond		Tigers	1946	1991	11	1958, 1967, 1968, 1969, 1970, 1973, 1975, 1977, 1980, 1985, 1989	In recess							
Richmond Juniors		Tigers	1950	1950	0	−	Folded; 1950							
St Kilda		Saints	1946	1991	1	1957	In recess							
Sydney (South Melbourne) (Note: South Melbourne relocated to Sydney in 1982 was renamed Sydney Swans in 1983.)		Swans	1947	1991	1	1956	In recess							
TAA		None	1949	1949	0	−	Folded; 1949							

=== Uniforms ===
Carlton	Collingwood	Essendon	Fitzroy	Footscray
Geelong	Hawthorn	Melbourne	North Essendon	North Melbourne
Richmond	Richmond Juniors	St Kilda	South Melbourne	Sydney	TAA

== Premiers ==
Richmond won the most under-19s premierships, with a total of 11.
