= 1947 VFL thirds season =

2nd season of the Victorian Football League thirds competition

- Date: May – 21 September
- Teams: 11
- Premiers: Melbourne; 1st premiership
- Minor premiers: Melbourne; 2nd minor premiership

The 1947 VFL thirds season was the 2nd season of the VFL thirds, the Australian rules football competition operating as the junior competition to the Victorian Football League (VFL).

This was the first season contested by VFL clubs Fitzroy, Geelong and South Melbourne. Additionally, the VFL invited the Doutta Stars Football Club (which competed in the Essendon District Football League) to field a side, with the team known as North Essendon.

Melbourne won their first thirds premiership, defeating reigning premiers North Melbourne by 12 points.

== Ladder ==
Teams played an uneven number of matches, with all clubs except Carlton, Essendon, North Melbourne, Richmond and St Kilda having two byes each.

Pos	Team	Pld	W	L	D	PP	Pts
1	Melbourne (P)	15	13	2	0	172.2	60
2	North Melbourne	16	13	6	0	160.9	56
3	Richmond	16	13	6	0	143.6	56
4	Carlton	16	10	6	0	161.7	44
5	Geelong	15	9	6	0	145.9	44
6	Essendon	16	10	6	0	122.0	44
7	Fitzroy	15	7	8	0	93.9	36
8	Hawthorn	15	6	9	0	77.0	32
9	St Kilda	16	2	14	0	53.1	12
10	South Melbourne	15	1	14	0	49.5	12
11	North Essendon	15	1	14	0	29.2	12

== Finals series ==
=== Grand final ===
	Grand final
Saturday, 6 September	Melbourne 12.13 (85)	def.	North Melbourne 11.7 (73)
