= Timur Kocaoğlu =

- Temur Xoʻja o‘g‘li
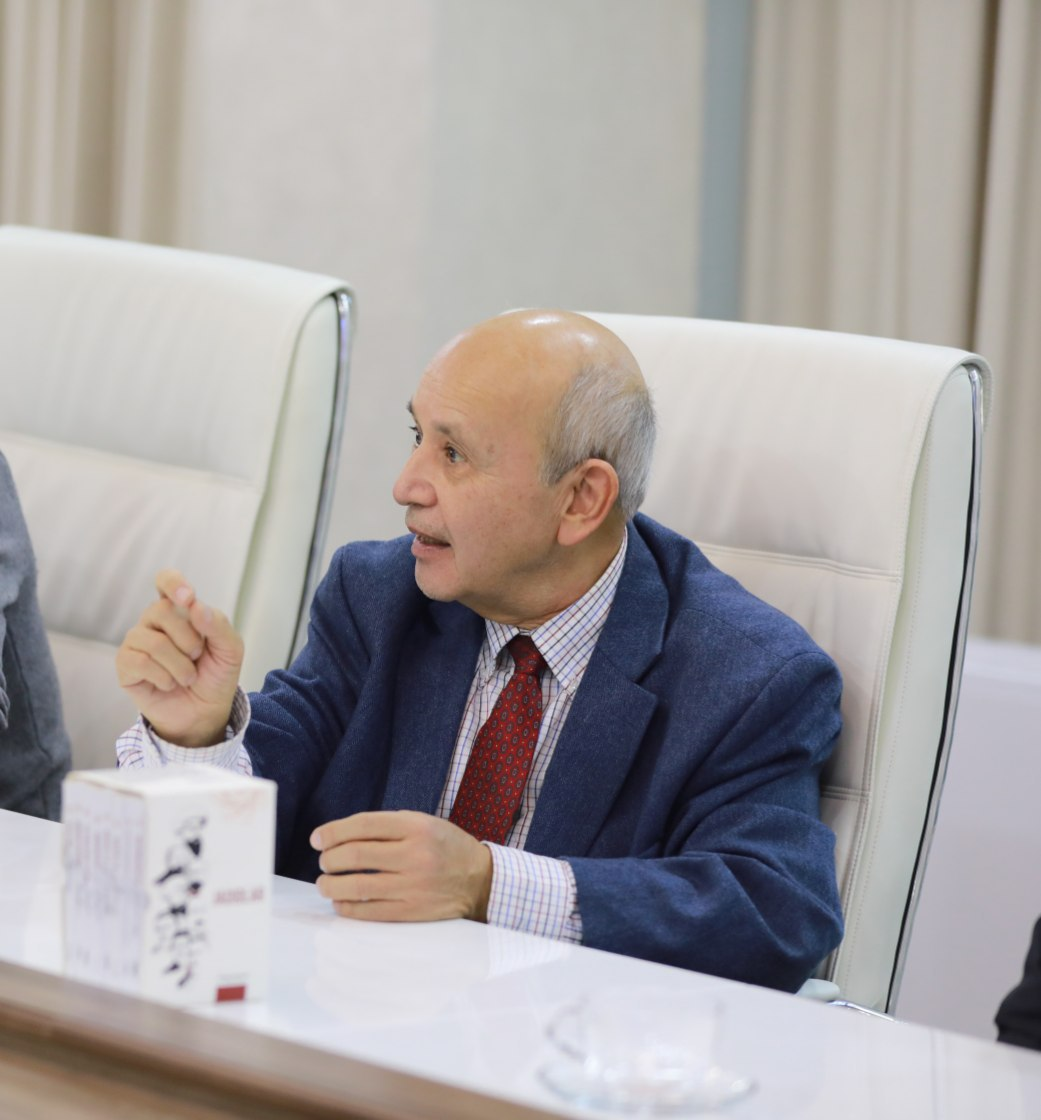
- Timur Kocaoglu in the building of the Youth Agency of Uzbekistan
- Born: 31 May 1947 (age 79); Istanbul
- Citizenship: Turkey
- Spouse: Nigorahanim
- Scientific career
- Fields: History linguistics political science
- Institutions: Marmara University; Koç University; Michigan State University
- Thesis: National Identity in Soviet Central Asian Prose Fiction of the Post-Stalin Period: 1953— 1982 (1982)
- Doctoral advisor: Edward Allworth

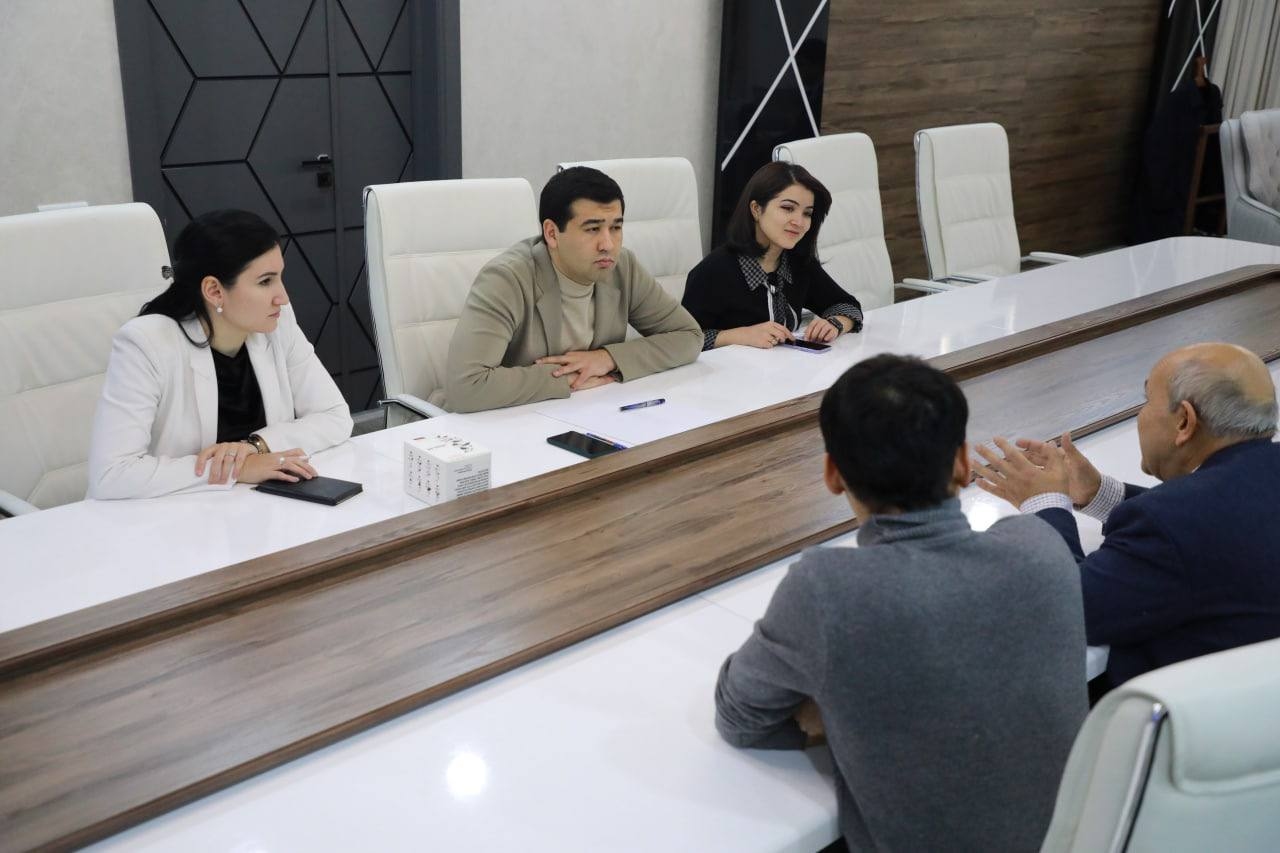
Timur Khoja oglu at a meeting with Alisher Saʼdullayev at the Agency for Youth Affairs of the Republic of Uzbekistan

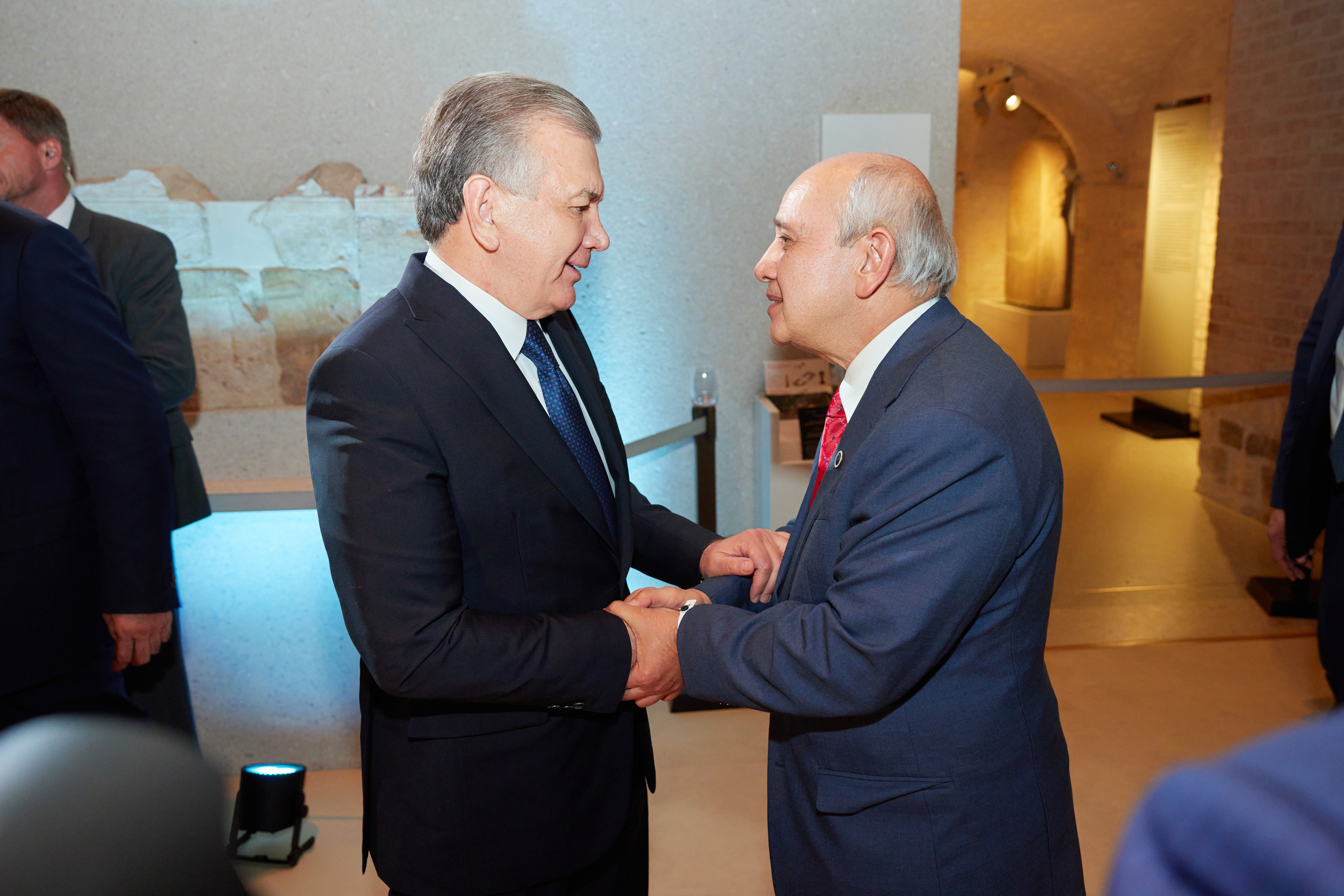
Timur Kocaoğlu and Shavkat Mirziyoyev. Photo from the opening ceremony of the exhibition of archeology of Uzbekistan in Berlin. May 3, 2023

Timur Kocaoğlu (Uzbek latin: Temur Xoʻja o‘g‘li; May 31, 1947, Istanbul) is an American and Turkish historian and political scientist of Uzbek descent. He was the first Uzbek scientist to defend his doctoral dissertation at Columbia University. He was born in Istanbul in 1947 in the family of Osman Kocaoğlu, one of the leaders of the Bukharan People's Soviet Republic. In 1971, he graduated from the Faculty of Literature, Department of Turkish Language and Literature of Istanbul University. In 1977, he studied at the Department of Arts, Middle Eastern Languages and Cultures (MELAC) at Columbia University (New York), and in 1979 he defended two master's theses in political science at the Department of International Studies of Columbia University. In 1982, he defended his doctoral dissertation on the topic "National Identity in Soviet Central Asian Prose Fiction of the Post-Stalin Period: 1953-1982" under the scientific supervision of professor Edward Allworth, who was founding director at Columbia of both the Program on Soviet Nationality Problems and the Center for the Study of Central Asia. After Timur Kocaoğlu defended this dissertation, he worked at Radio Liberty for many years.

== Life ==
Timur Kocaoğlu was born on May 31, 1947, in Istanbul. At that time, his father Osman Kocaoğlu was often forced to leave Turkey due to political pressure and move for work. When Timur was four years old, he and his family moved to Peshawar, Pakistan. He studied at Convent High School, an English language school, for three years. The Osman Kocaoğlu family returned to Istanbul in 1957, and Timur continued his education at Ahmet Rasim Elementary School. Later, he studied at Kartal High School and then at Pendik Lyceum. During his studies at the lyceum, he took lessons from history teacher Nazmiye Togon and literature teacher Selahattin Savci. Nazmiye Togan was one of the leaders of Turkish National Movement and the wife of the scientist Ahmad Zaki Validi Togan. His father Osmankhoja died when he was studying at the university. Osman Kocaoğlu invited his son Timur to his presence for the last time and made a will as follows: "I'm not leaving you money in the bank, I'm not leaving you tall mansions, fertile lands, I'm not leaving you brothers and sisters to support you, I'm just leaving you the sorrow of the Motherland so that you will always remember".

== Scientific career ==
Columbia University professor Edward Allworth being unaware of Osman Kocaoğlu's death sent a letter to him. There were some questions related to Bukhara and its political processes in the letter. Timur Kocaoglu, who received the letter, tried to answer some of the questions in the letter along with the news of his father's death. In this way, Timur Kocaoğlu got to know Professor Edward Allworth through a letter. Edward Allworth helped Timur Kocaoğlu to come to America through a grant when he noticed that he was interested in the literature of the peoples of Central Asia. In 1977, Timur Kocaoğlu began to work at Radio Liberty along with scientific activity. At that time, Radio Liberty broadcast in 22 languages. Among them were 6 Turkic languages (Uzbek, Kazakh, Kyrgyz, Turkmen, Tatar and Bashkir). The scientist wrote hundreds of scientific articles in Uzbek and English during the 17 years of his work at Radio Liberty. He also learned the German language while working in Germany. After taking a break from Radio Liberty, he worked at Marmara University in 1985–1988. After working at Radio Liberty for another four years, he returned to Turkey in 1993 at the invitation of Attila Askar, the dean of Koç University, and taught at Koç University. In 1995 — 2005, he worked at the Knowledge Council of Türk Dil Kurumu. He started working at the Michigan State University in 2011. He retired from Michigan State University in 2021. Now he is teaching online at the National University of Uzbekistan. In addition, he founded the scientific content "Türkbilim Sanaltayları" on YouTube and holds scientific conferences.

== Works ==
- Timur Kocaoğlu (Hazır.). Türk Dünyası Konuşma Kılavuzu/Turkic World Phrase Guide. Istanbul: Türk Dünyası Araştırmaları Vakfı, 1992; 156
- Timur Kocaoğlu (Haz.), Yaş Türkistan: Türkistan Milli İstiklal Fikrine Hizmet Eden Aylık Dergi (Paris). Cilt. 1 (1929–1930). İstanbul: Ayaz Tahir Türkistan İdil-Ural Vakfı Yayınları, 1997
- Timur Kocaoğlu, "Yaş Türkistanʼın Türkistan Basın Tarihindeki Yeri" Yaş Türkistan: Türkistan Milli İstiklal Fikrine Hizmet Eden Aylık Dergi (Paris). Vol. 1 (1929- 1930). İstanbul: Ayaz Tahir Türkistan İdil-Ural Vakfı Yayınları, 1997; s. 13
- Timur Kocaoğlu, (Hazır.). Reform Movements and Revolutions in Turkistan: 1900–1924. Haarlem (Netherlands): SOTA, 2001 (İlk Baskı); 506 sayfa
- Timur Kocaoğlu, (Hazır.). Reform Movements and Revolutions in Turkistan: 1900–1924. Haarlem (Netherlands): SOTA, 2001 (2. Baskı: 2018); 506 sayfa
- Timur Kocaoğlu. Karay: The Trakai Dialect. Munich: Lincom Europa Academic Publications, 2006; 243 sayfa.
- Timur Kocaoğlu. Sevgi Sözleri: Yırlar. Istanbul: Kutlu Yayınevi, 2018; 245 sayfa.
- Тимур Хўжа оғли, Севги Сўзлари. Тошкент: Қамар Медя, 2021
- Timur Kocaoğlu ile Akarturk Karahan, Sevgilim Güzel Hasineʼm: Yüzbaşı Şerafettinʼin Eşine Mektupları, 1911-1922 . Istanbul: Cümle Yayın., 2018; 144 sayfa
- Timur Kocaoğlu. Maghjan Jumabayev: The Poet of Flame, Liberty, and Love. Astana (Kazakhstan): International Turkic Academy, 2018; 93.
- Timur Kocaoğlu ile Muhammed Kayum Azizi. Binbir Bilmece: Afghanistan Özbek Ağızlarından. Istanbul: Uluslararası Türk Akademisi Yayını, 2019; 536 sayfa.
- Timur Kocaoğlu (Haz.) Türk Söz ile Kültür Varlıklarının İzinde. İstanbul: Türk Dil Derneği Yayını (Basım: Kutlu Yayınevi), Aralık 2020; 399
- Timur Kocaoğlu, Tülay Gençtürk Demircioğlu, ile Akartürk Karahan. Kurtuluş Savaşı’nın Unutulmuş Şairi Doktor Şerafettin Bey (1889–1922) Toplu Şiirleri.. Ankara: Türk Dil Kurumu, 2021; 287.
- Norman Graham, Folke Lindahl, Timur Kocaoğlu. Making Russia and Turkey Great Again. Lanham: Lexington Books, 2021, 244
- Joʻliboy Eltezerov ile Timur Kocaoğlu (Haz.). Buhara Cumhuriyeti 101 Yaşında / Buxoro Jumhuriyati 101 Yoshda. İstanbul: KutluYayınevi, 2021; 282. (Özbekistan baskısı: Taşkent: Mumtoz, 2021).
- Timur Kocaoğlu, "Çağdaş Özbek Edebiyatı" Türk Dünyası El Kitabı, Dördüncü Cilt: Edebiyat (Türkiye D ışı Türk Edebiyatları). Ankara: Türk Kültürünü Araştırma Enstitüsü, 1998 (Üçüncü Baskı); s. 179–197.
- Shamsiddin Kamoliddin — Tiur Kocaoğlu. Проэкт Културной Автономии Туркестана Махмудходжи Бехбуди 1907 [Mahmuthoca Behbudi’nin Türkistan Kültürel Muhtariyeti Tasarısı]. Saarbrücken: Lambert Academic Publishing.

== Bibliography ==
- Inoyatov S. "Qatagʻon qurboni boʻlgan uch buyuk siymo". "Taʼlim va innovatsion tadqiqotlar" Xalqaro ilmiy-metodik jurnal. Buxoro −2022. No. 1, -B.7-23
- Ayniy S. "Taʼrixi inqilobi Buxoro". Dushanbe, 1987
- "Tarixning nomaʼlum sahifalari", Hujjat va materiallar. Birinchi kitob. T.: "Gʻ.Gʻulom nomidagi nashriyot — matbaa ijodiy uyi", 2009.
- "Osman Khoja and the Origins of Jadidism in Bukhara, " in Türkistanʼda Yenilik Hareketleri ve İhtilaller, 1900-1924: Osman Hoca Anısına İncelemeler / Reform Movements and Revolutions in Turkistan, 1900-1924: Studies in Honour of Osman Khoja, ed. Timur Kocaoğlu (Haarlem: SOTA, 2001)
- Yaş Türkistan, Cilt 1 (1929— 1930), haz. Timur Kocaoğlu, Ayaz Tarih Türkistan İdil. Ural Vakfı Yayınları, İstanbul, 1997
