= 1946 VFL thirds season =

1st season of the Victorian Football League thirds competition

- Date: 3 May – 21 September
- Teams: 7
- Premiers: North Melbourne; 1st premiership
- Minor premiers: Melbourne; 1st minor premiership

The 1946 VFL thirds season was the inaugural season of the VFL thirds, the Australian rules football competition operating as the junior competition to the Victorian Football League (VFL).

Only 7 of the 12 VFL clubs with senior teams fielded a thirds side in the inaugural season − Collingwood, Fitzroy, Footscray, Geelong and South Melbourne did not compete. Several VFL clubs already operated thirds teams in local competitions, while others were affiliated with existing junior clubs.

North Melbourne won the first grand final, defeating Carlton.

== Ladder ==
Pos	Team	Pld	W	L	D	Pts
1	Melbourne					44
2	North Melbourne (P)					40
3	Carlton					32
4	Essendon					28
5	Richmond					16
6	St Kilda					8
7	Hawthorn					4

== Finals series ==
=== Semi-finals ===
	Semi-finals
Saturday, 7 September (12:00 pm)	Melbourne 4.8 (32)	def. by	North Melbourne 13.13 (91)	Ransford Oval
Saturday, 7 September (12:00 pm)	Carlton 6.13 (49)	def.	Essendon 2.9 (21)	McAlister Oval

=== Preliminary final ===
	Preliminary final
Saturday, 14 September (2:45 pm)	Melbourne 11.10 (76)	def. by	Carlton 12.21 (93)	Warringal Park, Heidelberg

=== Grand final ===
	Grand final
Saturday, 21 September (12:00 pm)	North Melbourne 11.9 (75)	def.	Carlton 5.12 (42)	Warringal Park, Heidelberg
