= Turkistanian American Association =

US organization for people from West Turkestan

- Turkiston-Amerika assotsiatsiyasi (Uzbek)
- Abbreviation: TAA
- Formation: 1958
- Founder: Ergash Shermat; Isokjon Narzikul; Hussein Ikrom; Azamat Altai; Ruzi Nazar
- Type: Non-Profit NGO
- Purpose: Promote culture and language of people from West Turkestan, especially Uzbek
- Headquarters: Dover, New Jersey
- Coordinates: 40°53′11.02″N 74°34′12.55″W
- Leader: Abdullah Khuzha
- Website: http://turkistanamerican.org/

Turkistanian American Association (Uzbek: Turkiston-Amerika Assotsiatsiyasi, تۇركىستان-ئامېرىكا ئاسسوتسىياتسىياسى; abbreviated TAA) is one of the oldest and most significant cultural and educational organizations of the people from West Turkestan in the United States. It is a non-profit organization located in Dover, New Jersey.

The mission of the association is to preserve the cultural, ethnic, and religious interests of the people from West Turkestan, especially Uzbeks.

== History ==
The association was founded in 1958 in New York City by first-wave immigrants from Central Asia, many of whom had left their homelands during World War II and the postwar period. Its primary goal was to preserve their national identity, cultural traditions, and language. The organization was officially registered in Dover, New Jersey.

One of the most prominent founders was Isakjan Narzikul, a broadcaster for Voice of America and Radio Liberty. He served as the association's first director from 1958 to 1961.

From 1962 to 1966, the association was led by Hussein Ikrom. During his tenure, he supported the relocation of Uzbek families from Turkey to the United States and strengthened the unity of the diaspora through the association's activities.

The third director, M. Maksudbek, served from 1967 to 1969. Under his leadership, a school was established in the United States to provide children with education in the Uzbek language, culture, history, and religious studies.

As the organization expanded, its first community center was purchased in Brooklyn, New York, in 1980. Approximately $44,000 was raised to acquire the building, which was subsequently renovated and rebuilt to better serve the needs of the association's members.

In the same year, Abdullah Khuja became director at the age of 27. He was later re-elected in 2004. During his leadership, the association organized its largest social and political events, helping to strengthen its reputation both in the United States and internationally.

== Mission ==
- Preserving and widely promoting the culture, customs, and history of Turkestan (especially Uzbekistan).
- Uniting the Turkestan community in the United States and creating a vibrant community.
- Developing cultural exchange by providing the American public with information about the religious life, traditions, and culture of Turkestan.
- Supporting traditional values through organizing cultural events, programs, and community activities.
- Creating opportunities for community members to engage with cultural, social, and community resources.
- Supporting programs that promote the personal and social development of the Turkestan community.
