= Trans Australia Airlines =

Airline of Australia (1946–1994)

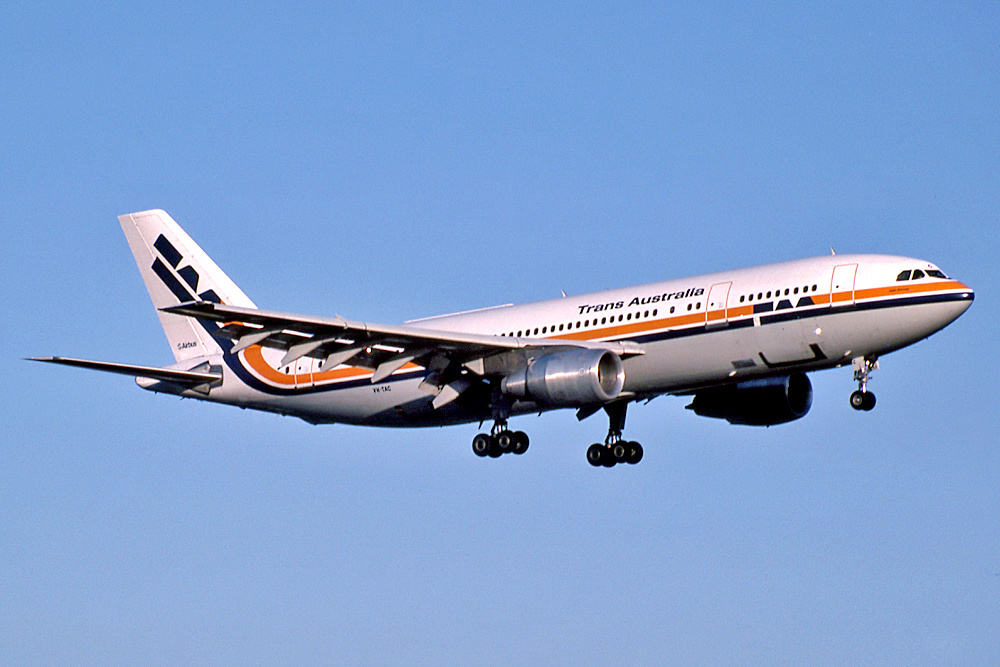
- Trans Australia Airlines Airbus A300B4-203 in 1983
IATA	ICAO	Call sign
TN	TAA	TRANSAIR
- Founded: 12 February 1946
- Commenced operations: 9 September 1946
- Ceased operations: April 1994 (acquired by Qantas)
- Hubs: Melbourne Airport (Essendon Airport from 1947 to 1971)
- Parent company: Australian National Airlines Commission
- Headquarters: Melbourne, Victoria, Australia

Trans Australia Airlines (TAA), renamed Australian Airlines in 1986, was one of the two major Australian domestic airlines between its inception in 1946 and its merger with Qantas in September 1992. As a result of the "COBRA" (or Common Branding) project, the entire airline was rebranded Qantas about a year later with tickets stating in small print "Australian Airlines Limited trading as Qantas Airways Limited" until the adoption of a single Air Operator Certificate a few years later. At that point, the entire airline was officially renamed "Qantas Airways Limited" continuing the name and livery of the parent company with the only change being the change of by-line from "The Spirit of Australia" to "The Australian Airline" under the window line with the existing "Qantas" title appearing above.

During its period as TAA, the company played a major part in the development of the Australian domestic air transport industry. The establishment of TAA broke the domestic air transport monopoly of Australian National Airways (ANA) in the late 1940s, and taking over the Queensland air network from Qantas. It was also at the time TAA supported the Royal Flying Doctor Service (RFDS) by providing aircraft, pilots and engineers to ensure every emergency was answered quickly. Qantas had also been instrumental in the formation of the RFDS.

The airline's headquarters were located in Melbourne. In 1954 TAA became the first airline outside Europe to introduce the Vickers Viscount, and in 1981 it introduced the Airbus A300, the first wide-body aircraft to be purchased by an Australian domestic airline providing TAA with a clear edge over a major competitor at the time, Ansett which had purchased instead, the Boeing 767-200, receiving the type approximately a year later. Ironically, although the A300s were initially painted in full Qantas livery, they were phased out within a few years being replaced by previously international operated Qantas 767-238ERs, 767-338ERs and later supplemented by seven ex-British Airways 767-336ERs.

Qantas revived the Australian Airlines brand between 2002 and 2006 to serve the low-cost leisure market of visitors to and from Australia but using a full-service model, operating selected Qantas 767-338ERs – although the livery used was not the same as that used by the previous domestic operation.

== History ==
=== Background ===
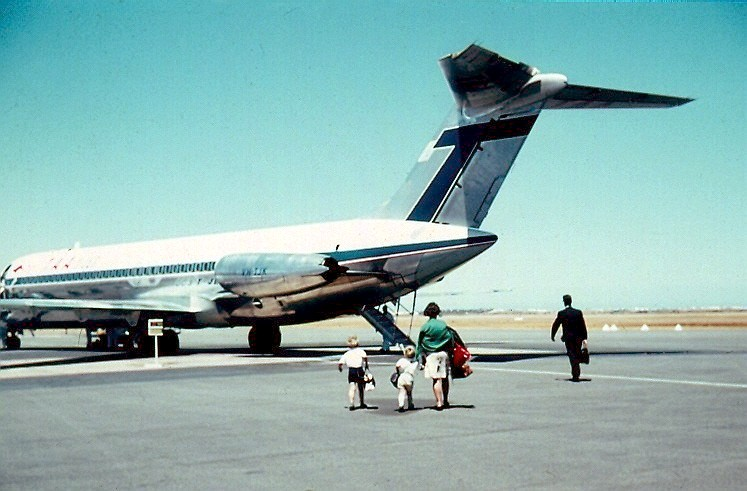
Passengers boarding a Trans Australia Airlines flight at Adelaide Airport, 1968

Up until World War II, Australia had been one of the world's leading centres of aviation. With its tiny population of about seven million, Australia ranked sixth in the world for scheduled air mileage, had 16 airlines, was growing at twice the world average and had produced a number of prominent aviation pioneers, including Lawrence Hargrave, Harry Hawker, Bert Hinkler, Lawrence Wackett, the Reverend John Flynn, Sidney Cotton, Keith Virtue and Charles Kingsford Smith. Governments on both sides of politics, well aware of the immense stretches of uninhabitable desert that separated the small productive regions of Australia, regarded air transport as a matter of national importance (as did the governments of other geographically large nations, such as the Soviet Union and the United States). In the words of Director General of Civil Aviation AB Corbett:

A nation which refuses to use flying in its national life must necessarily today be a backward and defenceless nation.

Air transport was encouraged both with direct subsidies and with mail contracts. Immediately before the start of the war, more than half of all airline passenger and freight miles were subsidised.

However, after 1939 and especially after Japan's invasion of the islands to the north in 1941, civil aviation was sacrificed to military needs. By the end of the war, there were only nine domestic airlines remaining, eight smaller regional concerns, and Australian National Airways (ANA), a conglomerate owned by British and Australian shipping interests which had a virtual monopoly on the major trunk routes and received 85% of all government air transport subsidies.

The Chifley government's view was summed up by Minister for Air, Arthur Drakeford:

Where are the great pioneers of aviation? … We discover that one by one the small pioneer enterprises are disappearing from the register. It is the inevitable process of absorption by a monopoly.

Air transport, the government believed, was primarily a public service, like hospitals, the railways, or the post office. If there was to be a monopoly at all, then it should be one owned by the public and working in the public interest.

In August 1945, two days after the end of World War II, the Australian parliament passed the Australian National Airways Bill, which set up the Australian National Airways Commission (ANAC) and charged it with the task of reconstructing the nation's air transport industry. In keeping with the Labor government's socialist leanings, the bill declared that the licenses of private operators would lapse for those routes that were adequately serviced by the national carrier. From this time on, it seemed, that air transport in Australia would be a government monopoly. However, a legal challenge, backed by the Liberal opposition and business interests generally, was successful and in December 1945, the High Court ruled that the Commonwealth did not have the power to prevent the issue of airline licenses to private companies. The government could set up an airline if it wished, but it could not legislate a monopoly. Much of the press objected strongly to the setting up of a public airline network, seeing it as a form of socialisation by stealth.

=== Beginnings ===
A Trans-Australia Airlines Skymaster

With the bill suitably amended to remove the monopoly provisions, the Australian National Airways Commission came into existence in February 1946. The commissioners themselves were prominent high-achievers, including the director-general of civil aviation, the deputy director, a Labor party luminary and former member of the Commonwealth Bank board, the director-general of posts and telegraphs, and the assistant secretary of the Treasury. The commission was to be chaired by Arthur Coles.

Coles was one of the richest men in Australia and the co-founder of the Coles Group. By this time, Coles had withdrawn from the active management of the family business. He was 'a great believer in competition for business' and would not have accepted the post of Chairman of the ANAC had the monopoly provision been retained.

The Commission decided on the name "Trans-Australia Airlines", applied to the Treasury for a preliminary advance of £10,000 and set about making plans, recruiting staff, and purchasing equipment. Reg Ansett, proprietor of the small Victorian company Ansett Airways was quick to offer to get the new airline off to a flying start by selling his entire operation to the ANAC as a going concern, including, if desired, his own services as managing agent. The asking price, the Commission decided, was optimistic, and Ansett declined a more modest counter offer.

There was considerable correspondence between the Commission and Ivan Holyman, the Chairman of ANA, with a view to recruiting Holyman as General Manager of TAA at the princely salary of £10,000 pa, and, when that offer was declined, of buying the near-monopoly airline outright. Holyman was not willing to sell, nor to work for a government-owned body, but was interested in setting up a "composite company", the details of which proposal remained unclear.

Eventually, the ANAC proceeded with the original plan, to build an airline from scratch. One of the first people hired was Lester Brain, then the operations manager at Qantas. Brain had 22 years of pioneering aviation experience behind him and was regarded as the man behind Qantas' reputation for technical excellence. He applied for the advertised position of TAA Operations Manager, but to his surprise and delight, was instead offered an appointment as General Manager — though at £3,000 pa, not the £10,000 that had been offered to Holyman.

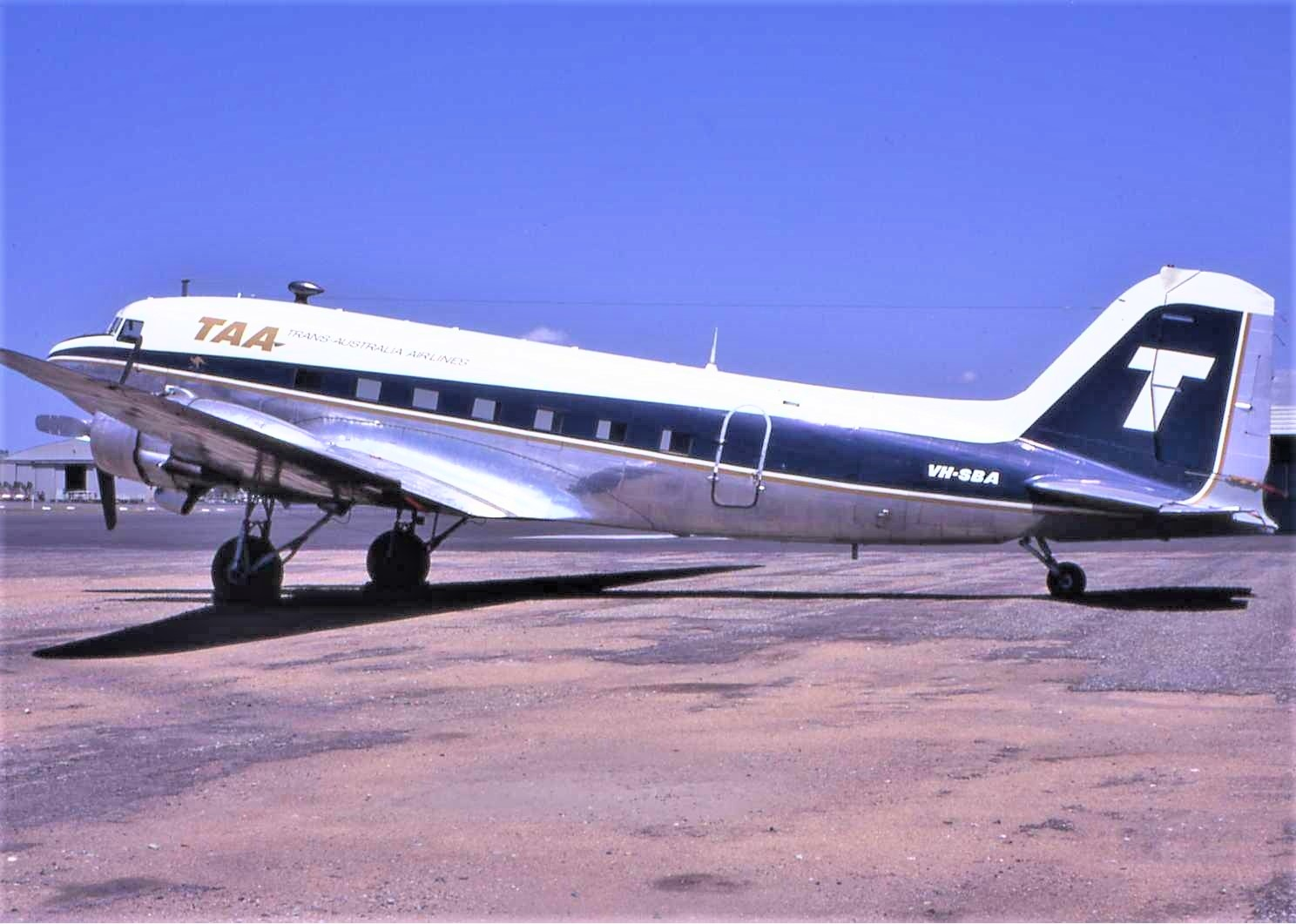
A TAA Douglas DC-3 at Brisbane Airport, early 1970s

TAA acquired its first two aircraft in mid-June 1946, both Douglas DC-3s. A dozen more DC-3s would be added over the next few months, all ex-Royal Australian Air Force aircraft originally bought by the Australian Government under lend-lease. In July, the Treasury released £350,000 to allow TAA to order four larger, more modern Douglas DC-4s in the United States, and Brain appointed Aubrey Koch (from Qantas) as Senior Pilot DC4 Skymaster and John Watkins as Chief Technical Officer. Watkins would become one of the key figures in TAA's success. His first task was to travel to the United States to accept delivery of the DC-4s. He later wrote:

To my utter astonishment Arthur Coles, after the expected pep-talk about the DC-4 assignment, said he was relying on me to find out what new equipment was being developed that would enable us to offer our passengers a better product than our established rival, at a competitive price.

It was typical of Coles, who knew nothing about aircraft, to reason that quality equipment would be vital, and then select the best man for the job of finding it and be prepared to back his judgement.

At this point, political considerations came to the fore again. TAA planned to start regular services on 7 October, but there was a federal election set for 28 September. Britain's wartime Prime Minister Winston Churchill had been enormously popular during the darkest hours but was voted out at the first post-war opportunity. There was no certainty that the Chifley government would not be treated likewise, and the opposition was opposed to government ownership. Coles addressed the Commission at a meeting on 2 September 1946.

Gentlemen, the Government wants us to start services as soon as possible. There is a Federal election on 28 September. If we don't have an airline up and running by then and Labor loses the election there'll be no airline. We'll be out of a job. Any suggestions?

After some discussion, it was agreed that the airline was not ready. It had a name, some excellent pilots, and some aircraft, but no ground facilities, no sales staff, no documentation, not even tickets. With a great deal of effort, it should be possible to make the planned start date of 7 October. With the discussion complete, Coles said:

I have news for you. We start next Monday.

After a week of hiring staff, borrowing a tin shed at the RAAF base at Laverton because Essendon Airport had been rendered unusable by heavy rain, creating operations manuals, passenger manifests, tickets, and load sheets — even making passenger steps and baggage carts because there was no time to buy them in the ordinary way — Captains Hepburn and Nickels took off from Laverton at 5:45 am bound for Sydney. TAA's first scheduled flight carried a full load of VIPs and just one paying passenger.

=== Rapid expansion ===
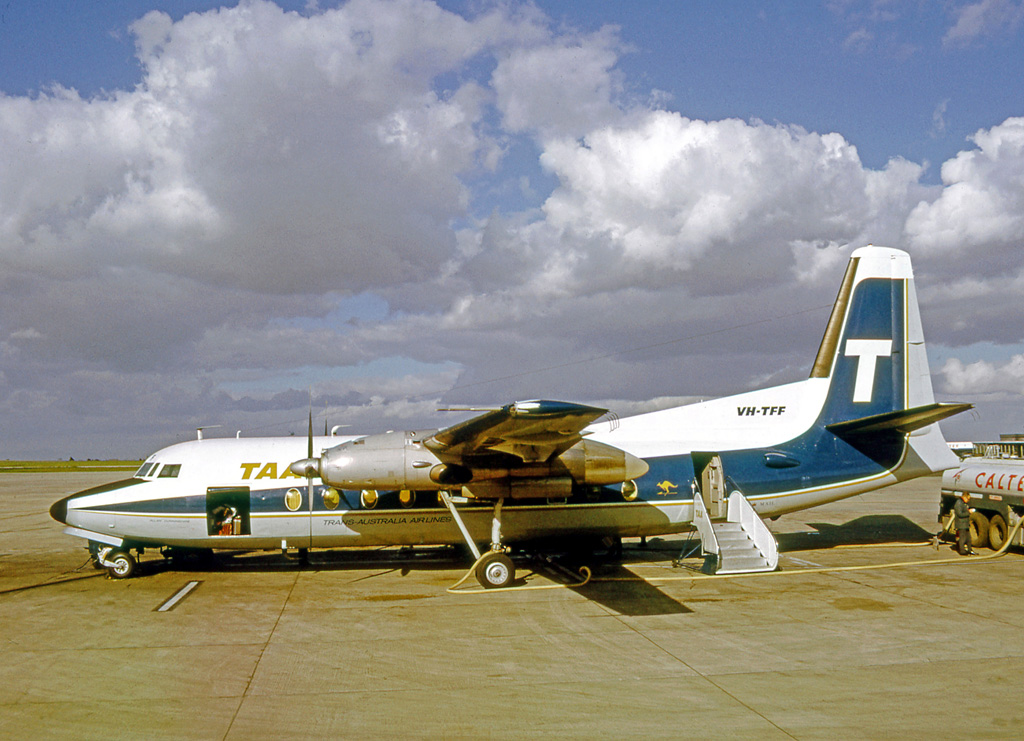
A Fokker Friendship Series 100 at Essendon Airport, 1970

The subsequent few years led to massive growth for the new airline. As post-war austerity gave way to a more affluent era, Australians were able to travel by air in ever-increasing numbers.

Much of the growth in domestic aviation in the 1950s, 1960s and 1970s was dominated by the rivalry between the privately owned Ansett-ANA and the government-supported TAA. A major factor in the success of the government airline was the choice of aircraft. After initially utilising the venerable and readily available Douglas DC-3, TAA was able to acquire the pressurised Convair 240. Popular with the travelling public because of its ability to fly above much of the weather, it was this aircraft that established the airline's reputation for excellence and service reliability.

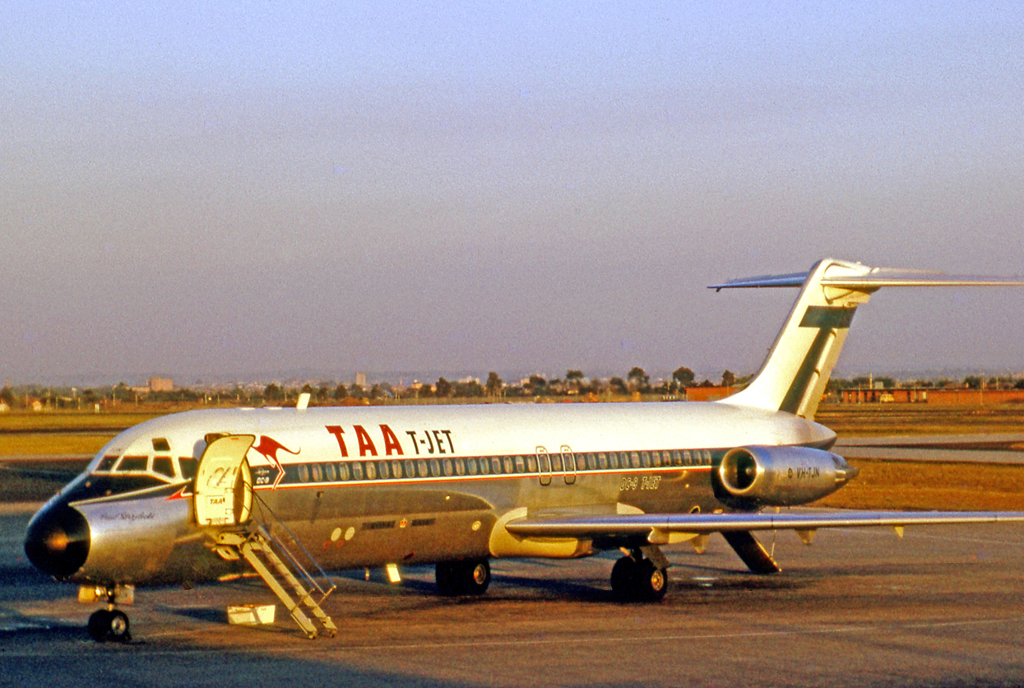
A TAA Douglas DC-9-31 at Essendon Airport in 1971, wearing the 1964-1969 Whispering T-Jet colour scheme used exclusively on DC-9s and Boeing 727s

East-coast services were continually expanded and TAA soon earned its title as a true 'trans Australian' airline with services to Perth on the west coast of the continent, using Douglas DC-4 aircraft. Vickers Viscount turboprop aircraft were introduced in the 1950s and again proved popular as a result of their smooth, vibration-free ride.

Although government-owned, the Liberal conservative government of the 1950s had a philosophical leaning towards the needs of the privately owned Ansett and the requirements of TAA suffered as a result. The controversial Two Airlines Policy was introduced and effectively seriously limited growth and expansion opportunities for the airlines without government approval.

Flight numbers and schedules were strictly controlled, and TAA and Ansett-ANA invariably had flights departing airports for the same destination at exactly the same time with exactly the same equipment. The policy was so strict that even newly purchased identical aircraft (one from each airline) were required on their delivery flights to enter Australian airspace at exactly the same time.

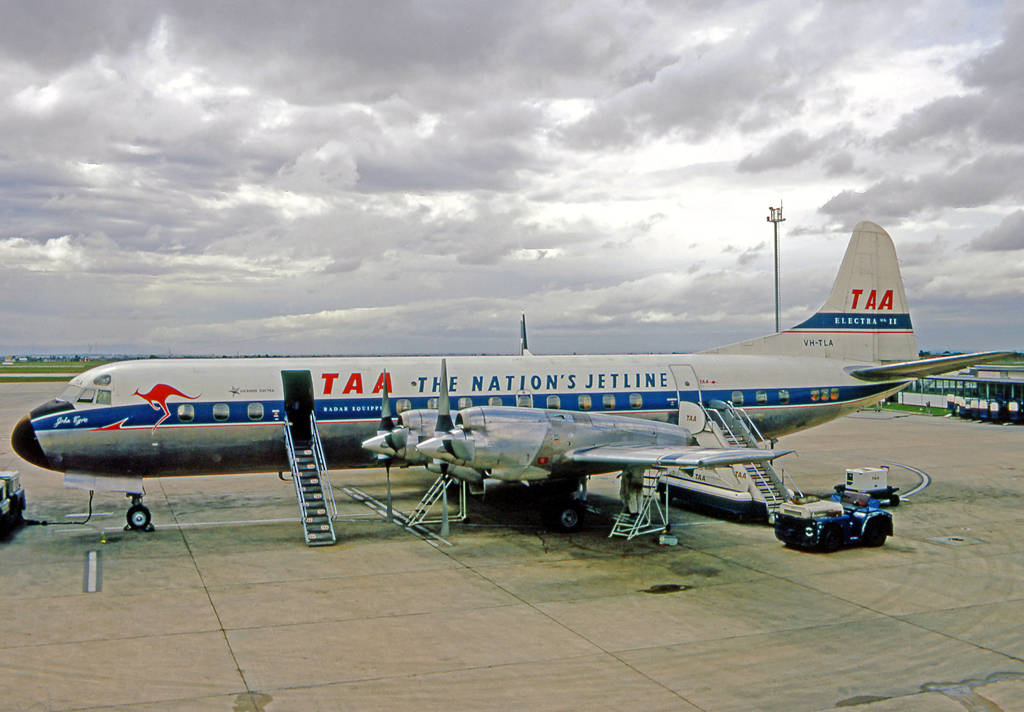
TAA's first Lockheed Electra II at Essendon Airport, January 1971, wearing the 1960-1969 Jetliner colour scheme

The conservative government's benevolent attitude towards Ansett was epitomised in the 1950s when it forced TAA to swap a number of its popular turbo-prop Viscount aircraft with Ansett-ANA in return for slower and older, piston-engined Douglas DC-6Bs. In another instance, TAA had planned to re-equip with the revolutionary Sud Aviation Caravelle pure-jet but as Ansett felt this was too advanced at that stage for their own needs, both airlines were required to purchase the Ansett preference: the less advanced turbo-prop Lockheed L-188 Electra.

The Electra proved a reliable aircraft and TAA continuously grew and prospered. In the 1960s it introduced Boeing 727-100 and McDonnell Douglas DC-9-30 Whispering T-Jets on primary routes as well as Fokker F27 Friendship Jetliner turboprops on regional routes.

By the late 1960s it had a massive network crisscrossing the continent, as well as an internal network within Papua New Guinea and flights from Darwin to Baucau in Portuguese Timor. At this time the airline's livery was the famous white "T" on a blue tail, referred to as "The Look of the '70s". One of the more memorable television advertisements of the period was the jingle "Up, up and away, with TAA, the friendly friendly way", whose lyrics and music were a variation on the 1967 song "Up, Up and Away", written by Jimmy Webb and also used by the US airline Trans World Airlines.

Further expansion occurred in the 1970s and larger 727-276s (simultaneously with Ansett) were acquired. Once again the terms of the introduction were restricted by the Two Airlines Policy. In 1974, TAA acquired a majority shareholding in Great Keppel Island. In July 1975 in partnership with Mayne Nickless it formed coach operator AAT Kings. In 1978, car rental company Kay-Hertz was purchased in partnership with Mayne Nickless. In December 1980, TAA commenced operating a service from Hobart to Wellington in New Zealand under a Qantas flight number.

The Two Airlines Policy was marginally relaxed in the early 1980s when TAA was able to introduce the Airbus A300B4, whilst Ansett chose to purchase the Boeing 767. The A300 was a revolutionary aircraft at the time for the domestic airline industry, in that it was a wide-body (twin-aisle) aircraft. It provided significant extra capacity on the trunk east coast network and to Perth. In 1986, Trans Australia Airlines was rebranded as 'Australian Airlines' and the kangaroo returned to its livery. Its new image coincided with a very successful and popular television campaign: "You Should See Us Now", "Face To Face" and "The Way We Do The Things We Do" became the carrier's new theme songs.

=== Rebranding ===
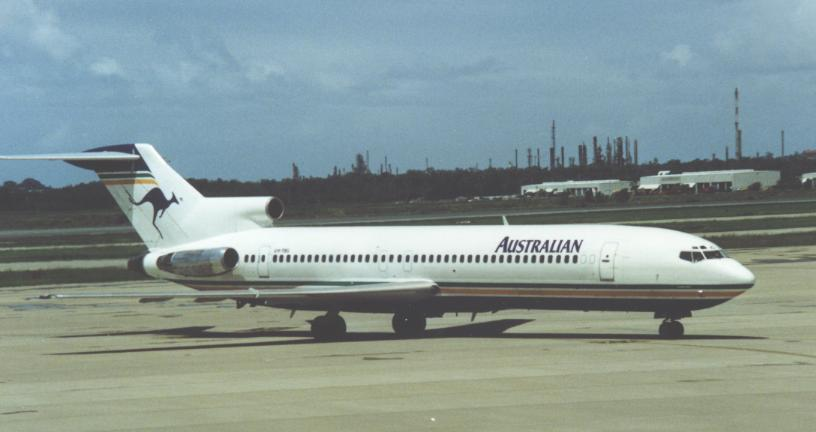
A Boeing 727 at Brisbane Airport, March 1992

In 1986, after a change of airline management, the name Trans Australia Airlines was controversially dropped, in favour of Australian Airlines. Associated with this image change was a new livery for the airlines' aircraft, which wore the title "Australian".

Australian Airlines was the travel sponsor for the television shows Neighbours, Wheel of Fortune and Sale of the Century between late 1987 and 1994.

Between 1980 and the merger with Qantas, selected teams participating in the Australian Touring Car Championship bore both Trans Australia Airlines (TAA) and Australian Airlines insignia, and from 1985 to 1990 the Seven Network commentary team used the airline to travel between the states to attend the various racing venues.

By the end of the 1980s, the government began to move towards deregulation of domestic aviation. Deregulation took effect in October 1990. A by-product of this impending change was the 1989 Australian pilots' dispute. As the result of prolonged wage suppression, this dispute saw the resignation of the majority of Australian Airlines' aircrew and the basic structure of the airline was changed forever. The Hawke cabinet not only encouraged the airline companies to employ overseas "strike breakers" but went even further, opting to pay the newly employed pilots from the public purse.

=== Downturn ===
The early 1990s changed the face of Australian domestic air travel. The federal government, although technically having deregulated the domestic aviation sector, made it effectively impossible for new entrant Compass Airlines to succeed. In 1987, the Hawke government announced that the then government-owned domestic air terminals would be effectively privatised and leased to the two domestic airlines. Compass, a threat to the TAA/Ansett duopoly, was granted severely limited access to terminal facilities.

At Sydney Airport both major airlines had effectively been given freehold ownership of their two separate terminals. The Federal Airports Corporation later purchased the Ansett terminal when it went broke in 2002. Any third airline operating there had to make do with the regional airline facilities. At other airports the two airlines had leased mostly empty terminals and installed all operational furnishings themselves. The airport authorities eagerly accepted lease money from Compass while providing almost no space in their terminals.

Ansett and TAA/Australian were the sole remaining players, in effect a de facto two-airline policy yet again. Throughout this period of transformation and deregulation, Australian Airlines continued its successful run by posting healthy profits, increasing passenger loads and gained much favour from its catchy television commercials. Although the merger with Qantas was seen as inevitable to give the latter a domestic network – and revive its bottom line – many former staff of Australian Airlines (TAA) and the general public mourned the loss of this iconic Australian brand.

=== Acquisition by Qantas ===
Although Compass was controversially and perhaps inevitably forced out of business, Australian's days, and those of Ansett, were numbered: the decision had been made at the federal government level to offer both government-owned carriers, Qantas and Australian, for sale. Australian Airlines was offered first but was quickly snapped up by Qantas, which offered $400m to purchase the domestic carrier. Qantas then decided to merge the airline into its network. Subsequently the government offered the entire merged operation in a public float, after selling a cornerstone 25% stake to British Airways, returning Qantas to the stock market after being absent from listing since 1947.

Qantas acquired Australian Airlines on 14 September 1992, in preparation for its closure on 30 April 1994. Subsequent to the merger, TAA/Australian's Boeing customer code '76' was replaced by the Qantas's customer code '38' for all subsequent Boeing aircraft deliveries, beginning with the Boeing 737-838.

The majority of the Australian Airlines branding was removed during the merger and replaced with Qantas branding; for instance, Australian's Flight Deck Lounge became The Qantas Club. The sole remaining Australian Airlines brand identity – The Australian Way (inflight) magazine – was rebranded as The Qantas Magazine in 2016.

=== Rebirth ===
In October 2002, Qantas revived the Australian Airlines brand as a full-service carrier, targeting the low-cost leisure market and flying primarily out of Cairns and Bali. This airline was disbanded in 2006 and its assets were absorbed back into the Qantas group.

=== TAA Museum ===
QANTAS originally allocated space at its Airport West Training Facility (formerly the TAA/Australian Airlines Flight Training Centre) for The TAA Museum, however in 2025 the Museum the museum started moving to a new location at Tullamarine Airport.

The museum displays items from Trans‑Australia Airlines' aviation history including aircraft archives, photographs, and memorabilia. The museum will reopen on the 11th August 2026.

== Fleet ==
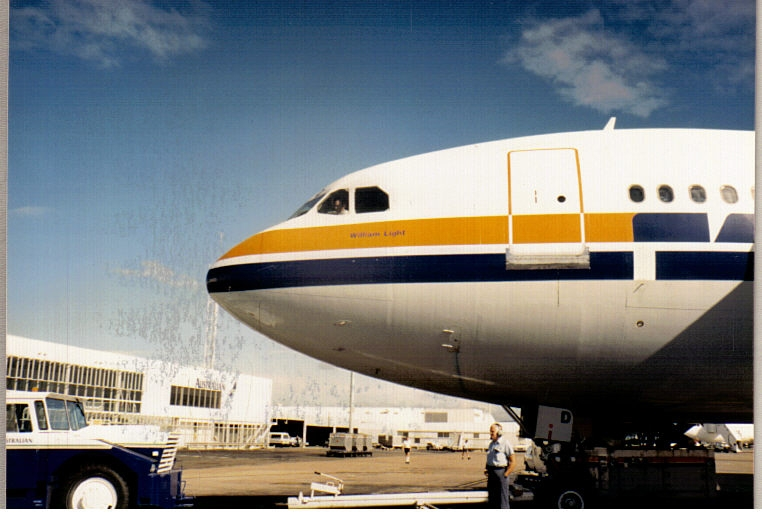
The nose section of an Australian Airlines Airbus A300 in TAA colours at Eagle Farm Airport, 1988

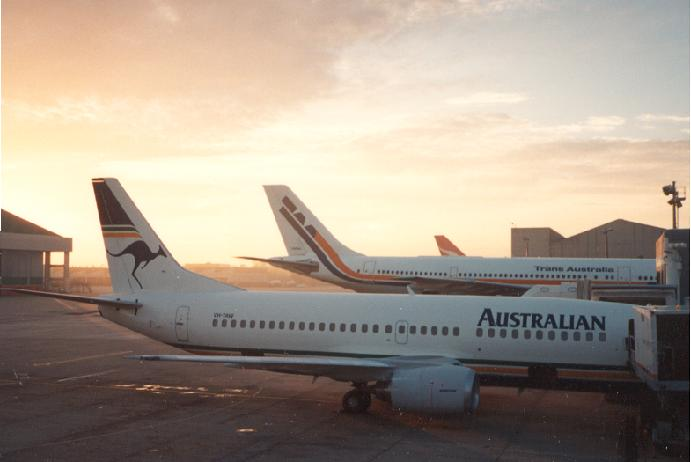
An Australian Airlines Boeing 737-300 at a gate at Sydney Airport, with a company Airbus A300 in the background, in TAA colors, 1987

Over the years, the airline operated the following aircraft types:

Aircraft	Introduced	Retired	Notes
Airbus A300	1981	1993	Wide-body aircraft. Transferred to Qantas.
Bell 47	1961	1971	Light helicopter
Boeing 707			Leased from Qantas
Boeing 727	1964	1992	Includes B727-100 and B727-200 aircraft
Boeing 737-300	1986	1993	Transferred to Qantas.
Boeing 737-400	1990	1993	Transferred to Qantas.
Boeing 747-200	1989	1990	One leased from All Nippon Airways.
Boeing 757-200	1989	1990	Two leased from Monarch Airlines
Bristol 170 Freighter	1961	1967	Cargo aircraft
Consolidated PBY Catalina	1962	1966	Amphibious flying boat built as Canadian-Vickers OA-10A for USAAF
Convair CV-240	1948	1959	One Convair CV-440 operated by HARS in TAA livery
de Havilland Canada DHC-3 Otter	1960	1966	STOL aircraft
de Havilland Canada DHC-6 Twin Otter	1966	1993	STOL aircraft
Douglas DC-3; Douglas C-47 Skytrain	1946		
Douglas DC-4; Douglas C-54 Skymaster			
Douglas DC-6			
Fokker F27 Friendship			Turboprop aircraft
Lockheed L-188 Electra	1959	1971	Turboprop aircraft
Lockheed Model 18 Lodestar			
McDonnell Douglas DC-9	1967	1989	DC-9-30 aircraft, last DC-9 passenger operator in Australia
Vickers Viscount	1954	1970	Turboprop aircraft

Australian Airlines also ordered the Airbus A320 and 'pictures' appeared in Australian aviation magazines advertising the paint company who were to supply the paint for the livery. The airline never took up the option on the A320 opting instead for the Boeing 737-400.

== Accidents and incidents ==
=== Fatal ===
- On 8 August 1951 at around 9 p.m. local time, a Trans Australia Airlines Douglas C-47 Skytrain (registered VH-TAT) crashed into the sea shortly after take-off from Cambridge Aerodrome for a cargo flight to Melbourne, killing the two pilots. They had lost control of the aircraft due to a severe ice build-up.
- On 31 October 1954, a Vickers Viscount (registered VH-TVA) crashed shortly after take-off from Mangalore Airport. Three of the eight crew members that had been on the training flight were killed.
- On 10 June 1960, Flight 538 from Rockhampton to Mackay, Queensland, which was operated by a Fokker F27 Friendship registered VH-TFB, crashed into the sea while approaching Mackay Airport, killing the 25 passengers and four crew on board. It was the worst accident in the history of the airline.
- On 24 May 1961, a Douglas DC-4 registered VH-TAA was destroyed when it crashed on Bulwer Island whilst on approach to Brisbane Airport, killing the two pilots that had been on the cargo flight from Sydney. The captain had suffered a heart attack and collapsed onto the throttles, and the co-pilot had thus been unable to see large trees in front of him because he could not reach the switch for the landing light.
- On 28 April 1970, a de Havilland Canada DHC-6 Twin Otter (registered VH-TGR) crashed shortly after take-off from an unpaved airfield near Kainantu, Papua New Guinea, killing the two pilots and six of the nine passengers on board.

=== Non-fatal ===
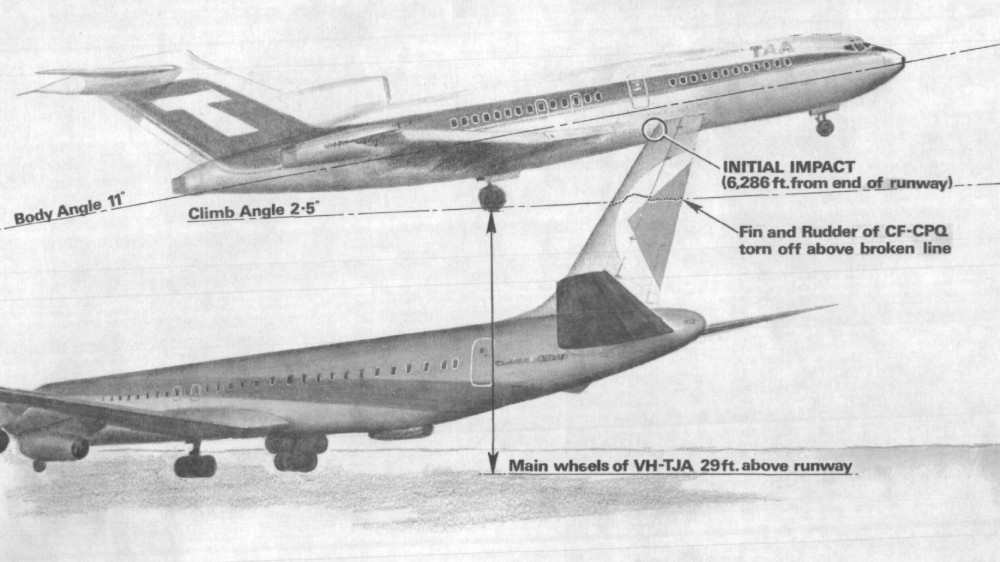
An illustration of the collision between the Boeing 727 and the Douglas DC-8

- On 29 January 1971, a Boeing 727 registered VH-TJA hit the tailfin of a Canadian Pacific Air Lines Douglas DC-8 (registered CF-CPQ) right after take-off from Sydney as Flight 592 to Perth. The DC-8 had not yet cleared the runway following its arrival. The TAA 727 suffered a gash in its fuselage, but the pilots managed to safely return the aircraft to the airport, so that there were no injuries.
- On 11 April 1972, a Douglas C-47 Skytrain (registered VH-PNB) that had been leased from Ansett, overran the runway on landing at Madang Airport, ending up in the sea damaged beyond economic repair.
- On 9 June 1982, a Fokker F27 Friendship was damaged beyond repair when it skidded off the runway upon landing at RAAF Base Amberley. The aircraft with three people on board had been on a training flight, which included a landing with one engine deliberately shut down, during which the pilot lost control.

=== Criminal occurrences ===
- On 19 July 1960, Flight 408 from Sydney to Brisbane, operated by a Lockheed L-188 Electra registered VH-TLB, was the subject of an attempted hijacking. An armed man demanded the flight be diverted to Singapore, but he was overpowered by the crew.
- On 8 June 1979, a hijacking attempt occurred on board a TAA McDonnell Douglas DC-9 during a flight from Coolangatta to Brisbane. The pilots landed at Brisbane Airport, where the perpetrator was arrested.
- On 21 September 1982, Trans Australia Airlines Flight 454, operated by a McDonnell Douglas DC-9 registered VH-TJS, was the subject of an attempted robbery of $600,000 from the Reserve Bank of Australia. The robbery involved four men consigning themselves as freight, intending to steal the money during two flights of the aircraft.
- On 13 February 1983, an Airbus A300 operating Trans Australia Airlines flight 004 was hijacked en route during a flight from Perth to Melbourne. The hijacker, Clifford Watego, a 27-year old university student, demanded to be flown to Tasmania. The pilots continued to Melbourne Airport, on taxi-in the hijacker, who was on the flight deck told the crew his bomb was on a timer – the aircraft was stopped and a full evacuation followed. The hijacker was subsequently arrested. He claimed that he was trying to alert the public to 'social injustices'.

== See also ==
- List of defunct airlines of Australia
- Aviation in Australia
- TAA (football club), a side representing TAA in the VFL thirds
