= Essendon Doutta Stars Football Club =

Essendon Doutta Stars

Names
- Full name: Essendon Doutta Stars Football Club
- Nickname(s): Douttas

Club details
- Founded: 1946; 79 years ago
- Colours
- Competition: Essendon District Football League
- Premierships: List: 20 (A-Grade): (1948, 1949, 1950, 1951, 1953, 1954, 1957, 1959, 1961, 1962, 1963, 1964, 1969, 1972, 1980, 1990, 1991, 1999
- Ground(s): Nipper Jordan Oval, Essendon

Uniforms
Home

Other information
- Official website: essendondouttastars.com.au

The Essendon Doutta Stars Football Club is an Australian rules football club located 10 km north west of Melbourne in the suburb of Essendon, and affiliated with the Essendon District Football League in 1946.

== History ==
Doutta Stars began playing football at Buckley Park in West Essendon in 1946 and consisted mainly of returned soldiers looking for sporting opportunities. The team developed a sense of tradition that has formulated its successes on, and continues to play at this ground today. Buckley Park is also the home for the cricket team since 1967 and the bowling and tennis clubs.

Since 1946, the club has helped develop a number of champion footballers, several of them going on to play in the AFL. Significant, though its development of football champions is, the club is even more proud of the community champions that it has produced during the same period. Doutta Stars fields all Grades Seniors and Juniors.

The club in 1949 and 1957 went through the seasons as Premiers and Champions of the League (undefeated).

In 1961 the club won the A Grade premiership and also won the inaugural Senior C Grade premiership.

The club finished last in A Grade for 1997 and was relegated to B Grade for the following season, won the B Grade premiership in 1998 and in 1999 won the A Grade premiership thus making Doutta Stars the only club in the League to win successive premierships in both Grades.

In 2011 with a new committee on board the members of the club voted for the name change to Essendon Doutta Stars Football Club. The main reason behind this was to identify the club with a Suburb like most of the surrounding clubs are.

In 2014, the Stars were relegated to Division 1, which saw the recruitment of Former Essendon great Dean Wallis to coach the club. Touted as the 2015 Division 1 experiment, Wallis will hopefully instill belief in the group, led by loyal clubman Jake Brown, to return the Stars to top flight football in 2016.

== Senior premierships (18) ==
- A Grade
  - 1948, 1949, 1950, 1951, 1953, 1954, 1957, 1959, 1961, 1962, 1963, 1964, 1969, 1972, 1980, 1990, 1991, 1999
- B Grade
  - 1998, 2015
