= Carlton–Collingwood rivalry =

Australian rules football rivalry

Carlton–Collingwood Rivalry
- Carlton Collingwood
- First meeting: 7 May 1892; 22 June 1897 (VFL/AFL)
- Latest meeting: 18 July 2026; Collingwood 14.6 (90) defeated Carlton 10.9 (69)

Statistics
- Total meetings: 270
- All-time series ( AFL only): Carlton 129 wins Collingwood 137 wins Draws 4

The sporting rivalry between Australian rules football clubs Carlton and Collingwood is the biggest and longest-lasting rivalry in the Australian Football League (AFL). The rivalry is regarded by some as one of the most historic and significant in Australian sport.

To date, Carlton and Collingwood have played each other 270 times in the VFL/AFL, with the ledger currently in Collingwood's favour (137 wins to Carlton's 129) and 4 draws. They have met six times in Grand Finals, with Carlton successful five times to Collingwood's one (in 1910 - see below).

The Peter MacCallum Cup is the longest-running charity match in VFL/AFL history, with the first clash taking place in 1993. Occurring whenever the two sides meet for a Collingwood home game, the clash aims to raise awareness and funds for Melbourne's Peter MacCallum Cancer Centre.

Carlton home matches are designated as the Richard Pratt Cup whilst Collingwood home matches are designated as the Peter Mac Cup.

== Early matches ==
In 1864, the Carlton Football Club was established, and in 1877, they were one of the founding clubs of the Victorian Football Association. In 1892, the Collingwood Football Club was established and admitted to the Association.

Once the VFA agreed to accept Collingwood's bid to join, it was realised that Collingwood had only scheduled 17 matches, when a minimum of 18 was required to qualify for the premiership. Collingwood looked unlikely to be eligible for the premiership in the upcoming VFA season until Carlton's club secretary, Jack Melville, cancelled a scheduled match with South Ballarat and instead scheduled an extra game against Collingwood.

On 7 May 1892, at Victoria Park, Collingwood and Carlton faced off for the first time, in Collingwood's first-ever VFA match. Carlton won the match by one goal, 3.13 to 2.11. (prior to 1897 points were only important if both sides had kicked the same number of goals.)

=== Billy Strickland ===
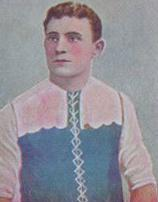
Bill Strickland as a Carlton player

Bill Strickland first played in the VFA for Carlton in 1885, and in 1887, was vice-captain as the Blues won their second VFA premiership.

At the start of 1893, Collingwood convinced Strickland to leave Carlton and play for them, in one of the first major player movements in Australian rules football history. Carlton did not show any bitterness towards Collingwood or Strickland, but his move would change the history and fortunes of Collingwood.

Strickland's arrival at Collingwood quickly turned the club into premiership contenders, and in 1896, Strickland would captain Collingwood to victory over South Melbourne in a play-off match to win the club's first ever premiership.

=== First VFL encounter ===
In 1897, both Collingwood and Carlton were part of the eight teams which broke away from the VFA to form the Victorian Football League. In Round 7 of the 1897 VFL season, the clubs played against each other in their first encounter in the new VFL. This was Carlton's first home game at Princes Park, its new home venue upon entering the VFL, and which would remain its home ground until 2005. Collingwood 6.4 (40) defeated Carlton 5.6 (36).

== 1910 Grand Final ==
The hostility in the rivalry between Carlton and Collingwood is considered by some sources to have commenced with the 1910 VFL Grand Final; until that time, the clubs were generally thought to be on friendly terms.

Early in the fourth quarter of the match, while Collingwood was leading, a huge brawl broke out involving at least thirty players and officials from both clubs; the fight was described by experienced umpire Jack Elder as the worst he saw in his VFL career. Collingwood held on to win by 14 points, but four players were reported for starting the big fight and as a result were heavily suspended.

Percy Sheehan (Carlton) and Jack Shorten (Collingwood) both were given 18-month suspensions, and Jack Baquie (Carlton) and Tom Baxter (Collingwood) both received 12-month suspensions. However, Collingwood appealed the Baxter suspension and produced a written declaration from another player, Richard Daykin, claiming that it was he and not Baxter who had traded blows with Baquie. The VFL chose to accept Daykin's confession and cleared Baxter of his 12-month suspension. Soon after Baxter was cleared, Daykin announced his immediate retirement from VFL football. Carlton vowed never to forget this day and they soon had their revenge by winning the Premiership from Collingwood in 1915.

== Head to head ==
Since joining the VFL in 1897, Collingwood and Carlton have faced off 270 times, which is the most of any two clubs in the VFL/AFL.

Head To Head Results
Clubs	Home and Away	Finals	Grand Finals	Total
Carlton	115	9	5	129
Collingwood	129	7	1	137
Draws	4	0	0	4
Played	248	16	6	270

=== Finals ===
In 112 years, the two clubs have played in 22 Finals against each other.

Their first meeting in a final was the 1903 semi-final. Collingwood won by 4 points before going on to win their second VFL Premiership.

They have not played against each other in a final since the 1988 Qualifying Final, which Carlton won by 38 points.

=== Grand Finals ===
Collingwood and Carlton have met in six VFL Grand Finals. Collingwood won the first (1910), and Carlton won the other five (1915, 1938, 1970, 1979 and 1981). The 1970 Grand Final is regarded as one of the league's all-time classic games, played in front of the largest ever crowd of 121,696, featuring a famous specky by Alex Jesaulenko, and won by Carlton after recovering from a 44-point half-time deficit.

==== 1910 ====
Team	1 Qtr	2 Qtr	3 Qtr	Final
Carlton	1.2	2.6	4.9	6.11 (47)
Collingwood	4.3	5.3	8.5	9.7 (61)
Crowd: 42,577 at the MCG.

==== 1915 ====
Team	1 Qtr	2 Qtr	3 Qtr	Final
Carlton	2.5	6.6	6.8	11.12 (78)
Collingwood	3.0	4.2	5.9	6.9 (45)
Crowd: 39,343 at the MCG.

==== 1938 ====
Team	1 Qtr	2 Qtr	3 Qtr	Final
Carlton	3.2	7.6	11.9	15.10 (100)
Collingwood	3.1	4.4	8.5	13.7 (85)
Crowd: 96,486 at the MCG.

==== 1970 ====
Team	1 Qtr	2 Qtr	3 Qtr	Final
Carlton	0.3	4.5	12.5	17.9 (111)
Collingwood	4.8	10.13	13.16	14.17 (101)
Crowd: 121,696 at the MCG.

==== 1979 ====
Team	1 Qtr	2 Qtr	3 Qtr	Final
Carlton	0.4	5.7	10.12	11.16 (82)
Collingwood	2.2	5.6	7.9	11.11 (77)
Crowd: 113,545 at the MCG.

==== 1981 ====
Team	1 Qtr	2 Qtr	3 Qtr	Final
Carlton	2.4	5.8	8.13	12.20 (92)
Collingwood	2.6	5.7	10.10	10.12 (72)
Crowd: 112,964 at the MCG.

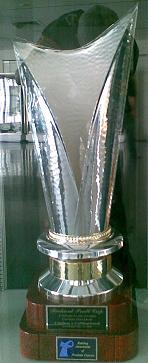
The Richard Pratt Cup

== Peter Mac Cup ==
Since 1993, both the Carlton and Collingwood Football Clubs have jointly raised awareness about treatment for cancer. Every year since 1993, an annual match between the clubs has helped raise money and awareness in cancer research. The inaugural Peter Mac Cup between the rivals took place in Round 6 of the 1993 AFL season. The trophy is named in honour of Sir Peter MacCallum MC, a Scottish-born Australian oncologist who was the co-founder of the Peter MacCallum Cancer Centre in Melbourne. Since 2010, Collingwood home matches are played for the Peter Mac Cup.

== Richard Pratt Cup ==
After former President of the Carlton Football Club and influential Melbourne businessperson Richard Pratt died in April 2009, both clubs announced that the following match between them would be played for the inaugural Richard Pratt Cup. Pratt died of prostate cancer and consequently the match is used to raise awareness of the disease. The inaugural Richard Pratt Cup between the rivals took place in Round 17 of the 2009 AFL season. Since 2010, Carlton home matches are played for the Richard Pratt Cup.

== History ==
=== Pre-1945 ===
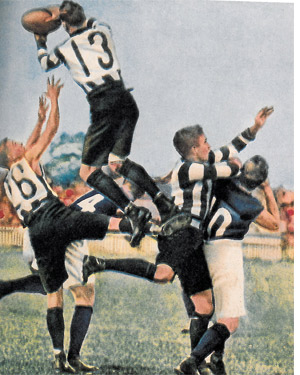
Dick Lee's Screamer in 1914

In round 1 of the 1914 VFL season, Collingwood hosted Carlton at Victoria Park. It was during this game when Collingwood's full-forward, Dick Lee, took one of the most recognised marks of all time. As a result, Lee had broken the ankle strap on his boot after taking the mark. He removed his boots and kicked the goal with his bare foot. This match was the first VFL draw between the clubs. Collingwood 8.8 (56) drew Carlton 6.20 (56)

Many Carlton and Collingwood players worked in the local brewery, as did Collingwood coach Jock McHale, who was a foreman. It was therefore a suspicious coincidence when, on the morning of the 1938 VFL Grand Final between two sides, Carlton captain-coach Brighton Diggins was rostered to clean barrels in the brewery steam room, while Collingwood acting captain Albert Collier had the day off. Carlton won the match.

=== Carlton success in the 1970s ===
"There were regular marches up Collins Street on Friday afternoons, then the next day you were at the footy, yelling only for Carlton or Collingwood."

— Journalist George Negus on life in Melbourne's student-heavy inner city in the 1960s and 1970s

In front of 112,838 people at the MCG, the two rivals put on a show in the semi-final of 1970. It was the second time since 1945 that the sides had met in a final. And the game would go down to the wire.

Alex Jesaulenko of Carlton kicked 8 goals for the day and Collingwood's Peter McKenna topped the goal kickers list with 9. The final margin was ten points, with Collingwood 17.16 (118) defeating Carlton 17.6 (108).

During the 1970 Grand Final, Alex Jesaulenko leapt upon Collingwood ruckman Graeme Jenkin to the commentary of Mike Williamson shouting "Oh Jesaulenko, you beauty!". The mark was the first to be recognised officially as the Mark of the Year, now awarded annually as the Alex Jesaulenko Medal.

After Carlton's narrow victory over Collingwood in the 1979 VFL Grand Final, Carlton president George Harris famously stirred up the rivalry when he proclaimed "What's better than beating Collingwood by ten goals? Beating them by five points!"

=== Warren Ralph after the siren ===
On Anzac Day 1984, 68,082 people sat on the edge of their seats in the dying seconds at Waverley Park, as Warren Ralph of Carlton was given a controversial free kick against Collingwood's Peter McCormack. With Collingwood six points in front, the final siren had sounded seconds after the umpire had called the free kick; 25 metres out from goal, Ralph needed to kick a goal to force a draw. His shot narrowly missed for a minor score, seeing Collingwood win by five points.

Collingwood 10.16 (76) defeated Carlton 9.17 (71).

=== Goals of the Year ===
Each team has once had a player kick a memorable Goal of the Year against the other.

External videos
- Mick McGuane's famous 7-bounce goal of the year in 1994

In Round 2, 1994, Collingwood's Michael McGuane received the ball and ran from the centre-square along the wing and half-forward flank, closing to 30 metres and kicking it through the goals. He bounced the ball a total of seven times during the famous run, winning the Goal of the Year award for 1994.

Twelve years later, in Round 21, 2006, Carlton's Eddie Betts smothered a handball in defence from Collingwood's Tarkyn Lockyer, gathered the ball just inside the boundary line, and kicked a goal with banana kick from the tight angle while under pressure from Magpie defender Simon Prestigiacomo, to win the 2006 Goal of the Year award.

=== The Millennium Match ===
On New Year's Eve 1999, the AFL celebrated the start of a new millennium with an early pre-season Ansett Cup match between the two rivals at the MCG. The game and event were both disappointments; fewer than 20,000 spectators attended, when a much higher crowd was expected, and Carlton won an uncompetitive match by 88 points. The game is best remembered for a young Brendan Fevola, who at this stage had played only two senior games, kicking twelve goals for Carlton.

Carlton 20.17 (137) defeated Collingwood 7.7 (49).

=== The 2000s: suburban matches and blowouts ===
Since 1987, games between the clubs were no longer scheduled at their traditional suburban home grounds of Princes Park and Victoria Park; to suit the larger crowds, all games had been scheduled for the M.C.G. and Waverley Park.

However, in Round 18, 2000, the teams met for one final suburban game, due to a minimum contract of games to be played at Princes Park for season 2000. Carlton fans would not be disappointed, seeing the Blues kick eleven goals to one in the third quarter and ultimately record a 111-point win, the greatest margin in any game between the two rivals. Carlton 28.12 (180) defeated Collingwood 10.9 (69).

Collingwood exacted revenge in Round 18 of the 2002 AFL season. In Nathan Buckley's 200th game, Collingwood showed no mercy to the Blues with a massive record-breaking 108-point victory, helping Carlton receive their first AFL wooden spoon. To add insult to injury, Joffa Corfe waved a giant wooden spoon around throughout the game. Collingwood 21.15 (141) defeated Carlton 4.9 (33).

Both teams were out of finals contention when they met in the last round of the 2004 season. But when Carlton and Collingwood came together at the MCG, the ladder positions became irrelevant, as they would record the largest home-and-away crowd for the 2004 season.

Collingwood started strong in the first half but their poor kicking in front of goal kept the door open for the Blues. After a five-goal third quarter, the Blues took the lead before a late Magpie charge fell short. Despite having four more shots at goal, Collingwood would lose to Carlton by a single point. Carlton 17.6 (108) defeated Collingwood 16.11 (107).

=== Malthouse vs. Buckley ===
Arguably the most significant of the contests between the two clubs in the 2010s came in Round 2 of the 2013 season. After coaching Collingwood for over a decade and having taken them to a premiership in 2010, Michael Malthouse had, somewhat reluctantly, stood down at the conclusion of the 2011 season, before being lured back into coaching by the Magpies' rivals twelve months later. The build-up to the match was intensely scrutinised by media and the public, with great attention paid to the increased hostility between Malthouse and senior Collingwood executive figures, such as Eddie McGuire and Nathan Buckley; the latter having played under Malthouse's management as captain of Collingwood for eight years.

Before a crowd of over 84,000 at the MCG, Collingwood came from behind to record a thrilling 17-point victory. Collingwood would go on to win the remaining premiership matches between the two teams while Malthouse was at the helm at Carlton, ensuring Buckley would obtain a 5–0 winning record against his former coach. Malthouse retired from coaching in May 2015, after having recorded his 718th match in the VFL/AFL as a senior coach, which came against Collingwood.

=== Round 23, 2022 ===
In the final round of 2022, the clubs met in arguably their biggest head to head clash since the 1981 Grand Final. Carlton were sitting eighth on the AFL ladder (though found themselves ninth on the "live" ladder by half-time) and aiming for their first finals appearance in nine years, whereas Collingwood were sitting fifth and aiming for a top four finish. In front of 88,287 fans, A titanic battle saw Collingwood lead by 17 points at half time, before Carlton booted eight goals to one in the third quarter to lead by 24 points at three-quarter time. But Collingwood fought back in the final term, and a Jamie Elliott goal in the dying minutes secured a one-point victory, denying Carlton a finals spot while claiming fourth spot. Had the match finished a draw, Carlton would have entered the top eight and Collingwood would not have entered the top four.

== Players/coaches who represented both clubs ==
Played or coached for both Carlton and Collingwood;
Bill Strickland (Carlton 1885–1892, Collingwood 1893-1897).
Les Abbott (Collingwood 1904, Carlton 1905).
Tom Clancy (Carlton 1910–14, Collingwood 1915–16).
Jack Lowe (Collingwood 1912–13, Carlton 1914).
Harry Curtis (Carlton 1913, Collingwood 1914–23).
Wally Raleigh (Collingwood 1913–15, Carlton 1920–21).
Harold Rumney (Carlton 1925–26, Collingwood 1927–37).
Les Hughson (Collingwood 1927, Carlton 1933–34).
Jim Crowe (Carlton 1929–34, Collingwood 1936–37).
Norm Le Brun (Collingwood 1933–34, Carlton 1935).
Harry Sullivan (Carlton 1950–54, Collingwood 1955–60).
Peter McKenna (Collingwood 1965–75, Carlton 1977).
Ray Byrne (Carlton 1973–78, Collingwood 1979–83).
Craig Davis (Carlton 1973–75, Collingwood 1979–83).
Russell Ohlsen (Carlton 1974–78, Collingwood 1979–81).
Michael McGuane (Collingwood 1987–96, Carlton 1997).
Barry Mitchell (Collingwood 1993, Carlton 1994–1996).
Trent Hotton (Collingwood 1994–96, Carlton 2000–02).
Heath Scotland (Collingwood 1999-03, Carlton 2004–14).
Cameron Cloke (Collingwood 2004–06, Carlton 2007–09).
Chris Bryan (Carlton 2005–06, Collingwood 2007–09).
Mick Malthouse (Collingwood coach 2000–11, Carlton coach 2013–15).
Jordan Russell (Carlton 2005–12, Collingwood 2013).
Dale Thomas (Collingwood 2006–13, Carlton 2014–2019).
Alex Fasolo (Collingwood 2011–18, Carlton 2019).
Josh Fraser (Collingwood 2000–10, Carlton coach 2026-).

== See also ==
- Carlton Football Club
- Collingwood Football Club
- Rivalries in the Australian Football League
