= AFL Grand Final =

Australian rules football premiership match

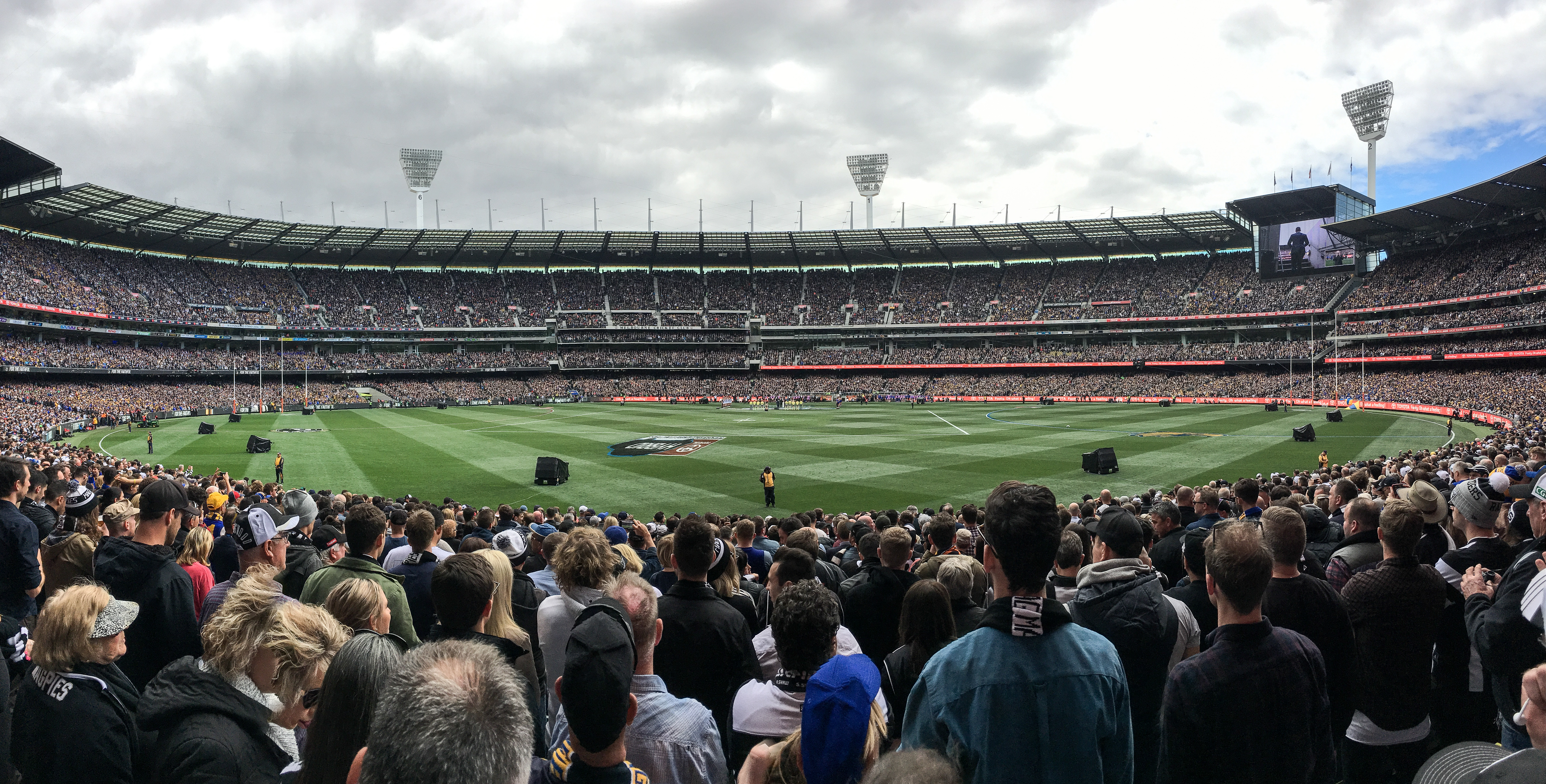
- Panorama of the Melbourne Cricket Ground prior to the 2018 AFL Grand Final
- Other names: VFL Grand Final (historical), "the Granny", "The GF", "The Big Dance", "The Big Day", and "The One Day in September"
- Sport: Australian rules football
- First meeting: 24 September 1898
- Latest meeting: 26 September 2026
- Next meeting: 2 October 2027
- Broadcasters: Seven Network
- Stadiums: Melbourne Cricket Ground (all but 11 occasions)

Statistics
- Total meetings: 131
- Most wins: Carlton, Collingwood (16) (Note: Although Essendon have 16 premierships, they have only won 14 grand finals as no VFL grand final was played in 1897 or 1924.)

The AFL Grand Final is an Australian rules football match to determine the premiers for the Australian Football League (AFL) season. Prior to 1990, it was known as the VFL Grand Final, as the league was then known as the Victorian Football League, and both were renamed due to the national expansion of the competition. The game has been held annually since 1898, apart from 1924, at the end of the finals series. It is traditionally staged on the afternoon of the last Saturday in September, at the Melbourne Cricket Ground. The match attracts one of the largest audiences in Australian sport, with crowds regularly exceeding 100,000 and a television audience of millions.

The club that wins the grand final receives the AFL's premiership cup and flag; players on the winning team receive a gold premiership medallion, and the best player receives the Norm Smith Medal.

A total of 131 grand finals have been played, including three grand final replays. The Carlton Football Club and Collingwood Football Club have both won 16 grand finals, the most of any club; the Essendon Football Club has also won 16 premierships, although only 14 were earned in grand finals. Collingwood has appeared in the most grand finals, a total of 45, and has also won the most consecutive grand finals, with four between 1927 and 1930. Every current AFL club apart from the Gold Coast Football Club has played in at least one grand final.

== Match history ==
=== Early history (1897–1915) ===
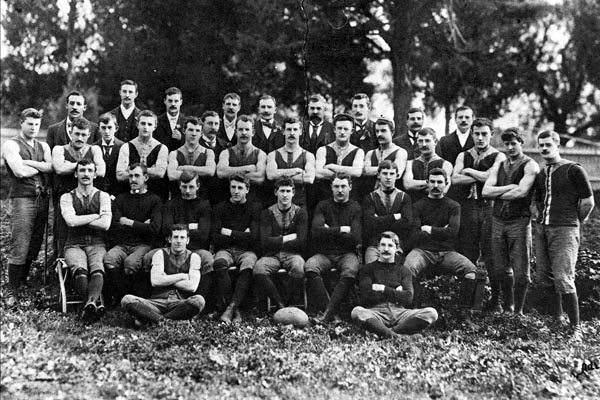
The 1898 Fitzroy team, winners of the inaugural VFL Grand Final.

The Victorian Football League (VFL) was established for the 1897 season by eight clubs which seceded from the Victorian Football Association (VFA). The new league introduced a system of finals to be contested after the home-and-away matches; this ensured that the premiership could not be decided until the last match had been played, generating greater public interest at the end of the season — compared with the VFA's system, which awarded the premiership based on win–loss record across the entire season, with a playoff match only in the event of tied records. The league arranged that the gate from finals matches be shared among all teams, which guaranteed a better dividend to the league's weaker clubs.

Although the finals system used in 1897 had the possibility of a grand final, one was not required. As such, the match now recognised as the first grand final took place in the league's second season, on 24 September 1898, between Essendon and Fitzroy at the St Kilda Cricket Ground. This match too had been in doubt until the night before it was played, Essendon disputing the choice and fitness-for-use of the St Kilda ground, which had already been top-dressed for the cricket season. Despite appealing to the league and even announcing it intended to forfeit, Essendon relented and played the game, and Fitzroy won the inaugural grand final 5.8 (38) d. 3.5 (23) before a crowd of 16,538.

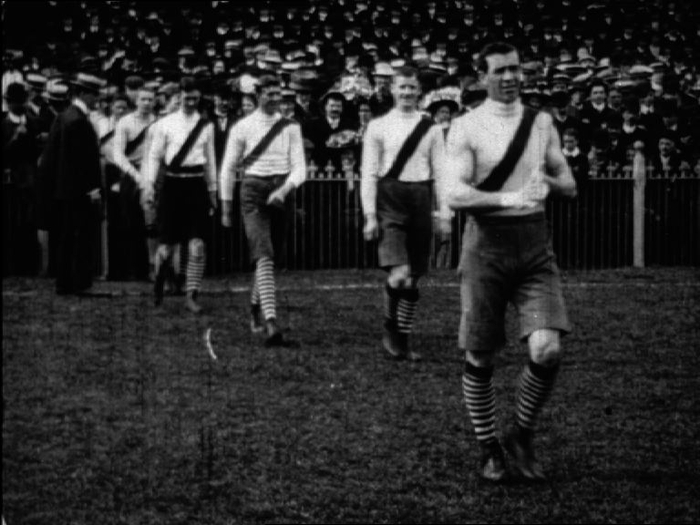
South Melbourne players enter the field before the 1909 grand final.

Most VFL finals systems utilised until 1930 comprised a short finals system, usually a simple knockout tournament ending with a match called the 'final'; if the 'final' was not won by the home-and-away season's minor premiers, then the minor premiers had the right to challenge the winner of the 'final' to a playoff match for the premiership. At the time, it was only this challenge match, if played, which was known as the grand final; however, all 'final' matches which decided the premiership have since retrospectively been considered grand finals. The 1899 VFL grand final is the earliest such game; it was won by Fitzroy, while losing team South Melbourne would have had to have defeated Fitzroy again in a challenge match to win the premiership. In all, eleven 'finals' are now considered grand finals: eight which were won by the minor premiers and would have resulted in a challenge match had the result been reversed (1899, 1904, 1907, 1908, 1911, 1918, 1927 and 1928); and three which decided the premiership but which could not have been followed by a challenge match due to the finals systems and circumstances of those years (1901, 1903 and 1906).

In 1902, the grand final was first played at the Melbourne Cricket Ground, when Collingwood 9.6 (60) defeated Essendon 3.9 (27) before a then-record Australian football crowd of 35,000. By 1908, every finals match was played at the Melbourne Cricket Ground, and new attendance records were set in 1908 (50,261), 1912 (54,463) and 1913 (59,479). During this period, Carlton became the first club to win three consecutive premierships, winning 'finals' in all three years.

=== Between the wars (1916–1945) ===
Football and grand finals continued through World War I, albeit with reduced attendances, and some controversy that it distracted from the war effort, with one critic calling for the Carlton team to receive the Iron Cross as their premiership medallion. However, many diggers supported the continuance of the game, and returned servicemen were granted free admission to a portion of the grandstand for the 1918 grand final, with many attending in uniform.

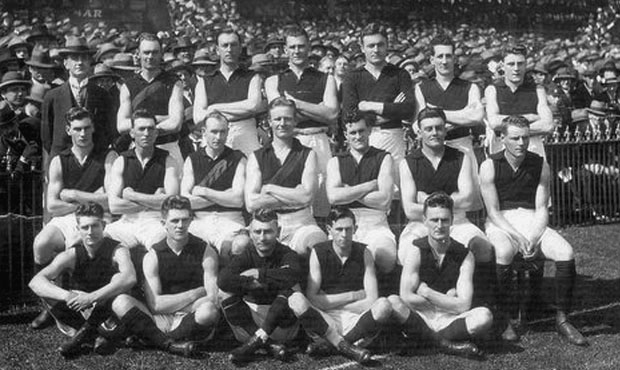
Essendon's premiership team from 1923.

During the 1920s, the VFL grappled with the problems of the challenge final system — specifically that the league was not always guaranteed four finals, and there was the perception that semi-finals could be thrown to guarantee a grand final and the dividend which came with it. On several occasions during the 1920s, semi-final crowds exceeded that of the final or grand final. In 1924, for the second and last time, no recognised grand final was played; a round-robin finals system was played, with the top team from the round robin to face the minor premiers in a grand final if required; but, when minor premiers Essendon also won the round robin, no grand final was staged. This new finals system was abandoned after one year. A new record crowd of 64,288 was set in 1925, when Geelong played and won its first grand final, attracting a huge contingent of both provincial and metropolitan supporters. Between 1927 and 1930, Collingwood became the first and only club to win four consecutive premierships, winning in 'finals' in 1927 and 1928, then grand finals in 1929 and 1930.

In 1931, the Page–McIntyre Final Four system was introduced for finals, which eliminated the minor premier's right to challenge and guaranteed four finals and a genuine grand final each year. Under this system, and all systems which followed it until 1993, one team entered the grand final with a bye week after winning the second semi-final; and the other entered after winning the preliminary final in the week before the grand final. More often than not, the grand final was a rematch between the teams who played the second semi-final two weeks earlier.

Several new record crowds were set through the 1930s, and the Melbourne Cricket Ground's new Southern Stand was constructed and opened in 1937. That year, the Geelong–Collingwood grand final attracted 88,540, with spectators crossing the fence and sitting eight deep along the boundary line; the following year, another record of 96,486 watched Collingwood play Carlton. Melbourne dominated the final years before the Pacific War, comfortably winning grand finals in 1939, 1940 and 1941.

Football served as a distraction for people and as a war fundraiser on the home front during the World War II. The Australian government requisitioned a number of VFL grounds, including the Melbourne Cricket Ground, so the grand finals were staged at Carlton's Princes Park in 1942, 1943 and 1945, and at the St Kilda Cricket Ground in 1944. The last of those games, in 1945, saw a capacity crowd of 62,986 squeeze into the Carlton ground, which was played just weeks after the armistice with Japan was declared.

=== Post-war (1946–1990) ===
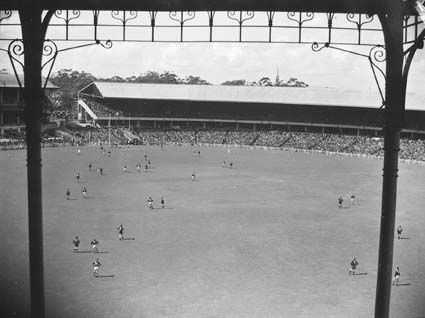
The VFL grand final in 1946 from the stands of the Melbourne Cricket Ground

When the Melbourne Cricket Ground was relinquished by the government in August 1946, there was great expectation in the buildup to the grand finals, and attendances were soon back to 1930s levels. In 1948, Essendon and Melbourne played the first drawn grand final in history; a full replay was played the following week, which Melbourne won. The sight of thousands sitting between the fence and the boundary line was now usual at the grand final, often resulting in injuries to spectators when players collided with them. Spectators were admitted on a first-come basis, and thousands took to lining up outside the stadium from the Friday before the match to gain the best vantage point when the gates opened on the morning.

As the Melbourne Cricket Ground was used as the main stadium for the 1956 Olympic Games, the ground was upgraded again with a new stand and extra capacity, and the 1956 grand final was seen as a dry run for the opening ceremony of the games two months later. Although the official capacity was 120,000, the ground could not comfortably accommodate the record crowd of 115,802. Some spectators who gained entry perched dangerously on the back fences of the grandstands and even the roof of the southern stand to get a view of the game; and in violent scenes outside the ground, at least 2,500 gained entry by mobbing gates, climbing fences or sneaking in when the Military Band arrived, while at least 20,000 more were turned away at the gate. To finally prevent a recurrence of these growing crowd management problems, the VFL introduced a pre-purchase ticketing system for the finals and grand final from 1957, and attendances hovered around the health department's revised ground capacity of 102,000 over the following years.

Melbourne dominated the 1950s, playing a record seven consecutive grand finals from 1954 to 1960, and winning five premierships, including three in a row from 1955 to 1957. The establishment of the modern premiership cup in 1959 gave the after-match a ceremonial focus and allowed the attention to settle on the premier team, ending the previous custom of the crowd descending on the arena and variously chairing or walking the players off the ground. Delayed telecasts of the match were first shown on television in 1961. The grandstands were expanded again in 1968, and an enduring record crowd of 121,696 saw one of the most famous grand finals of all in 1970, in which Carlton overcome a 44-point half-time deficit to defeat Collingwood. Live telecasts of the grand final into Victoria began in 1977, which saw the second drawn grand final between North Melbourne and Collingwood. The Norm Smith Medal, awarded to the best on ground in the game, was introduced in 1979.

The 1980s saw a concerted effort by the VFL to relocate the grand final to its privately owned VFL Park, in search of a better commercial deal, but the move was ultimately blocked by the state government and the game remained at the Melbourne Cricket Ground. The 1980s saw a sustained period of dominance by Hawthorn, which contested seven consecutive grand finals from 1983 to 1989, winning four of them. The 1989 Grand Final, a high scoring and very physical encounter in which Hawthorn defeated Geelong by six points, is considered to be one of the greatest of all time. By 1990, Collingwood had lost the last eight decisive grand finals it had played since its 1958 premiership, a streak which became known as the "Colliwobbles"; this came to an end with its victory against Essendon in the 1990 grand final.

=== National era (1991–present) ===
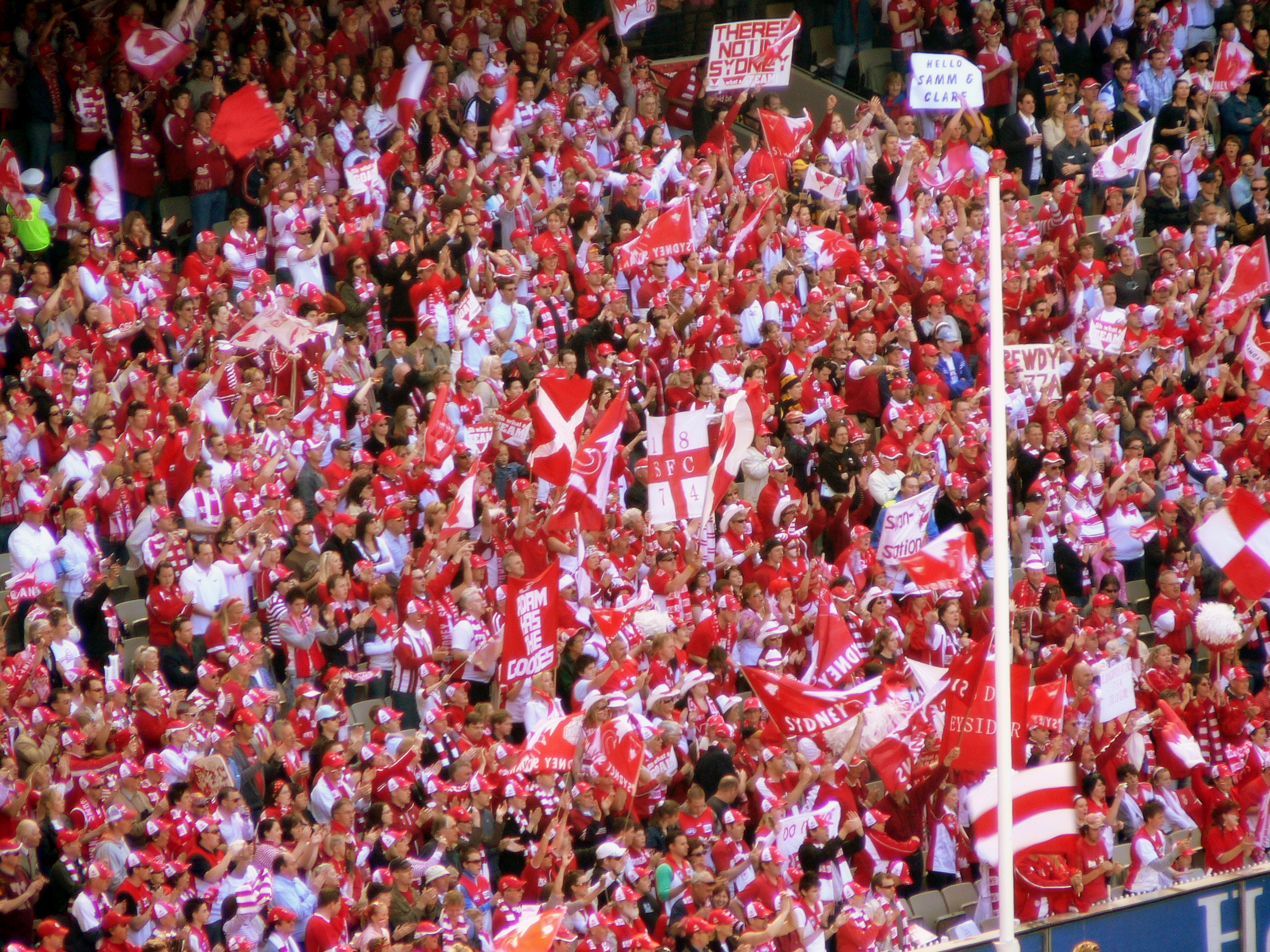
Sydney Swans supporters celebrate a goal against Perth's West Coast Eagles at the 2006 Grand Final.

Starting in the 1980s, the Victorian Football League (VFL) expanded interstate, and it was renamed the Australian Football League (AFL) in 1990. Perth-based West Coast, which joined the league in 1987, became the first non-Victorian club to both contest and win a grand final, in 1991 and 1992, respectively; and, between 1992 and 2006, non-Victorian clubs won ten out of the fifteen grand finals, with the Brisbane Lions enjoying the greatest success, with three premierships in a row between 2001 and 2003.

Since 1994, new finals systems required both grand finalists to qualify by winning a preliminary final in the previous week, ending the long-standing custom of one qualifier enjoying a bye in the week before the grand final. The third and final drawn grand final occurred in 2010 between Collingwood and St Kilda, with Collingwood winning the replay; extra time has since been introduced to decide drawn grand finals, but it is yet to have been required. Hawthorn was dominant in the early 2010s, winning three grand finals in a row between 2013 and 2015.

The COVID-19 pandemic affected the scheduling of the match in 2020 and 2021, as outbreaks of the virus in Melbourne during finals precluded unrestricted travel and mass gatherings in Victoria. In 2020, when most of the league's clubs had been relocated to Queensland for the majority of the season, the grand final was played at the Gabba in Brisbane, the first time it had been played outside Victoria. It was also played at night, the first time it was not played in the afternoon time slot. The following season, it was played at Optus Stadium in Perth in a twilight timeslot. The Brisbane Lions have had the most success in the 2020s to date, winning three grand finals in a row from 2024 to 2026.

== Prize ==
Aside from the prestige of winning the premiership, the premiership-winning club receives four prizes: the premiership cup, the premiership flag, the E. L. Wilson Shield, and A$1.2 million in prize money.

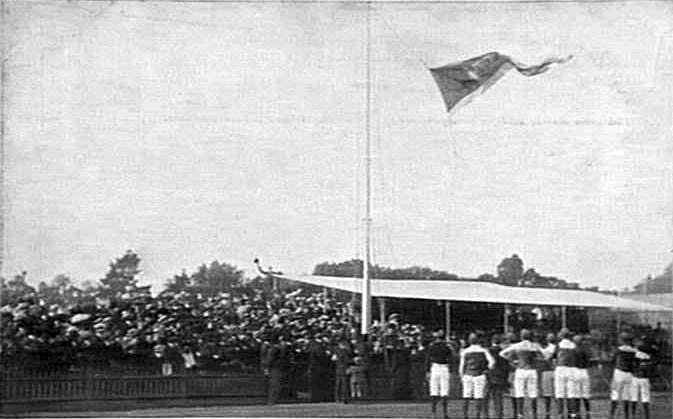
Carlton Football Club hoists the 1906 VFL premiership flag at Princes Park in 1907

The premiership flag is the most symbolic and longest-standing award for the clubs. It is a large, triangular pennant in league colours (navy blue fimbriated with white) and emblazoned with the league logo, the word 'premiers' and the year of the premiership. It does not feature in post-match presentations, but tradition dictates that it be ceremonially unfurled from the flagpole at the premiers' first home game of the following season. The awarding of a flag, and its ceremonial unfurling, have been tradition since the very first VFL premiership in 1897, and had been customary before that in the VFA and other sports in Victoria since around 1889. Although the flag is of lower physical importance than the cup, it retains its symbolic significance, and "the flag" is still widely used as a metonym for the premiership itself in Australian rules football parlance, including in many of the league's team songs.

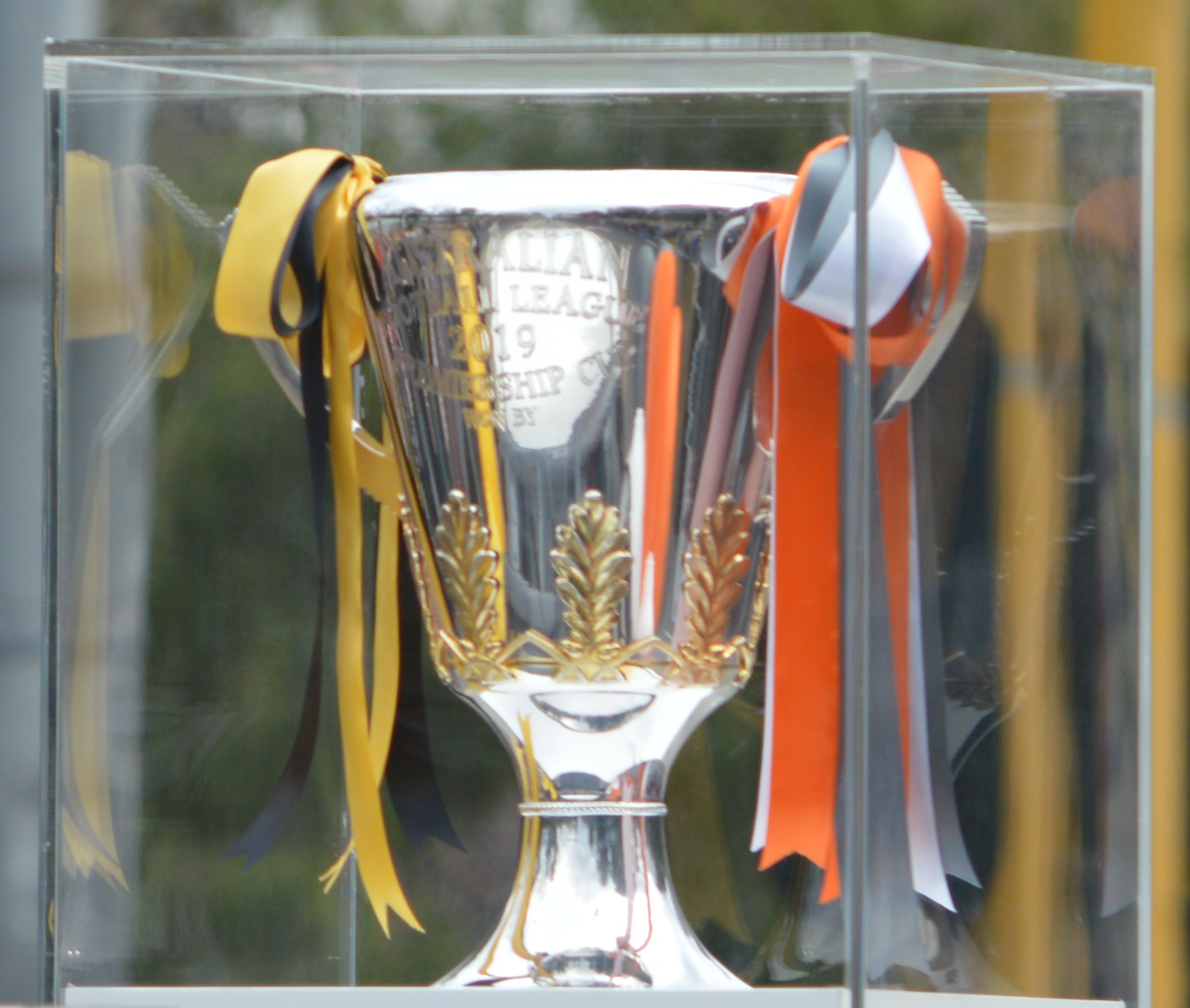
The 2019 AFL Premiership Cup, bearing ribbons in Richmond and Greater Western Sydney colours.

The most prestigious award for supporters is the AFL premiership cup, which is presented to the captain and coach of the winning team in a ceremony after the game. Prior to the Grand Final, it is traditional for the captain of each side to hold one side of the cup in official promotional photos. The premiership cup is silver (with the exception of the 1996 cup, which was gold to commemorate the league's 100th season), and it is adorned with ribbons in the winning team's colours when presented. A new cup is manufactured each year by Cash's International at its metalworks in Frankston. The cup was first introduced in 1959 after league president Kenneth Luke sought to recreate the spectacle he had observed at England's FA Cup final; a lap of honour with the cup by the winning team has become customary since 1966. Since 2004, it has become tradition for the cup to be presented by a past legend of the winning club, with each club's potential presenter nominated ahead of the game. In 2004, the AFL allowed clubs to purchase cups based on the current design for premierships won prior to 1959.

The premier club's name is also recorded on the perpetual E. L. Wilson Shield, which resides at AFL House. The shield, inaugurated in 1929, was named after long-serving VFL secretary Edwin Lionel Wilson. It was initially discontinued after 1978, when there was no room remaining on the shield. In 2016, it was rediscovered under a stairwell at AFL House; it was refurbished, extra space was added, and it was brought up to date. It, too, does not feature in the on-field presentation.

As of 2019, the premier also receives $1.2 million in prize money, with $660k for the runners-up. Prior to its increase in 2007, the prize for the premier was only $250k, which was not even enough to cover an interstate club's participation in the finals series.

=== Premiership medal ===
Each player from the winning team who plays in the grand final is awarded a premiership medal. For much of the league's history, premiership medals were awards made by clubs or their benefactors to the players as part of their celebrations; however, since live telecasts of the game were introduced in 1977, the medal has been a league award presented in the on-field presentation following the match. Since 2002, the medals have been presented each year by children selected nationwide from the Auskick junior football program.

The league-endorsed medal dating from 1977 is awarded only to the players who participate in the winning grand final team (or in a drawn grand final team if their team won the replay). Players who do not play in the grand final itself do not receive the medal, regardless of their contribution to the club's season; this has been a point of contention, with many observers believing medals should be more broadly awarded across the premier's squad. Criteria for the club-awarded medals prior to 1977 depended on the individual clubs' decisions.

From 1977 until 1981, runners-up medals were also presented during the post-match ceremony. This was discontinued after 1981, popularly attributed to the negative spectacle of Collingwood's Peter Moore — in his fourth losing grand final — throwing the medal on the ground shortly after receiving it.

=== Individual awards ===
The Norm Smith Medal is presented to the player judged best on ground in the grand final by a panel of experts. The award is named in honour of ten-time Melbourne premiership player and coach Norm Smith. It was first awarded in 1979, and has come to carry great prestige as an individual prize.

The coach of the winning team receives the Jock McHale Medal, named in honour of Collingwood coach Jock McHale who coached a record eight premierships. The medal was first awarded in 2001, and it was retrospectively awarded to all premiership-winning coaches starting from 1950, the first season after McHale's retirement from coaching.

The captain or co-captains of the winning team receive the Ron Barassi Medal, named in honour of ten-time premiership player and coach Ron Barassi Jr. The medal was first awarded in 2024.

The game's leading goalkicker or goalkickers receive the Jack Collins Medal from the AFL Premiership Players' Club.

== Venue ==
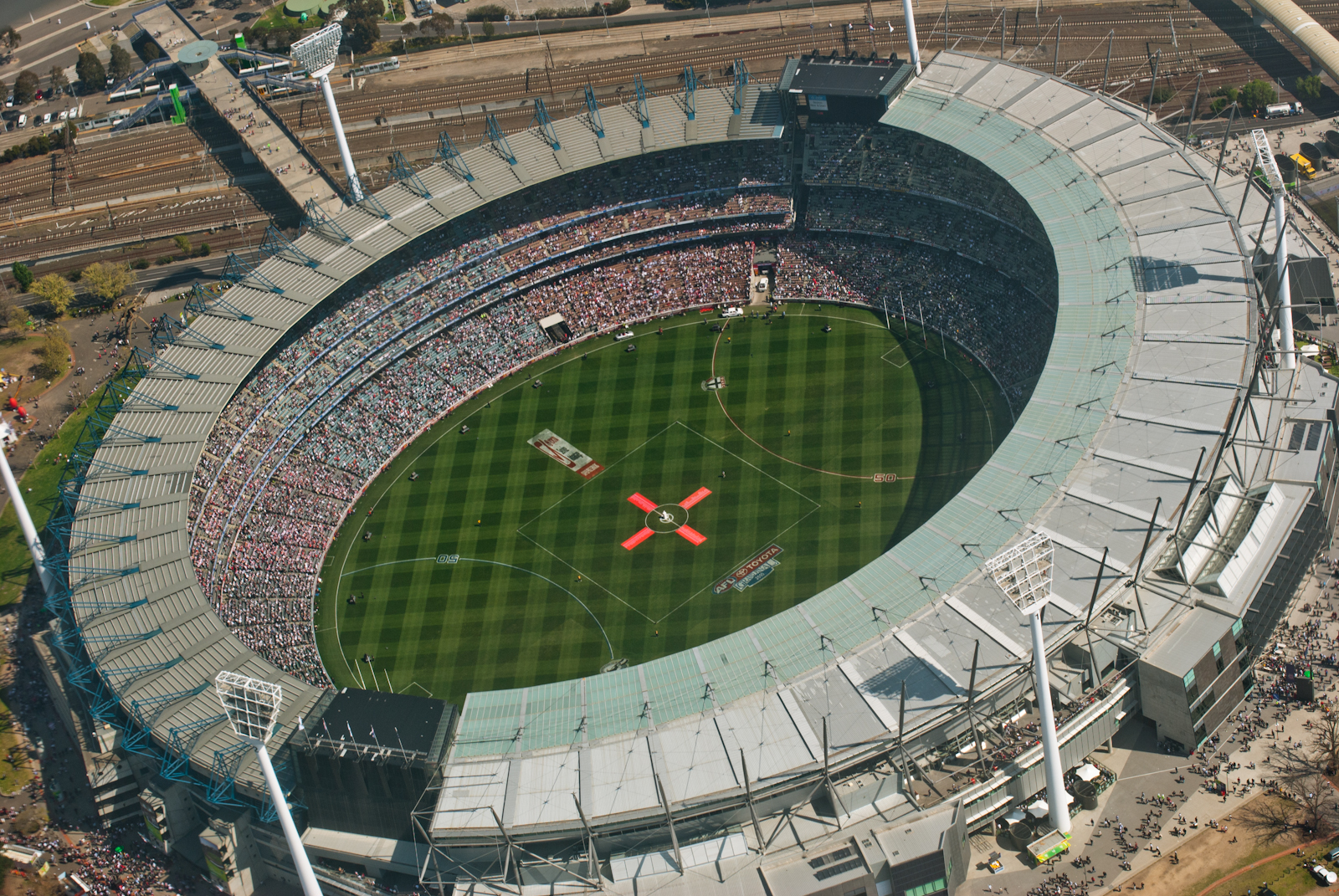
The 2010 AFL Grand Final at the Melbourne Cricket Ground.

The first four Grand Finals were played at different neutral venues chosen by the league's match committee a week in advance: these were played at the St Kilda Cricket Ground (1898 and 1899), the East Melbourne Cricket Ground (1900) and the South Melbourne Cricket Ground (1901).

Since the fifth Grand Final in 1902, after a deal was made with the Melbourne Cricket Club (MCC), the Grand Final has been played at the Melbourne Cricket Ground every season, except when it has been unavailable. Under the current agreement among the AFL, MCC and Victorian Government, the ground is contracted to host the game every year until 2059.

Since 1902, only seven Grand Finals have been played at other grounds:

- In 1942 to 1945, when the Melbourne Cricket Ground was requisitioned for military use during World War II: these Grand Finals were played at Princes Park (1942, 1943 and 1945) and the St Kilda Cricket Ground (1944).
- In 1991, when the capacity of the Melbourne Cricket Ground was halved due to construction of the Great Southern Stand: the Grand Final was played at Waverley Park.
- During the COVID-19 pandemic in 2020 and 2021, when travel and crowds were restricted in Victoria during the finals; these Grand Finals were played at The Gabba in Brisbane (2020) and Optus Stadium in Perth (2021).

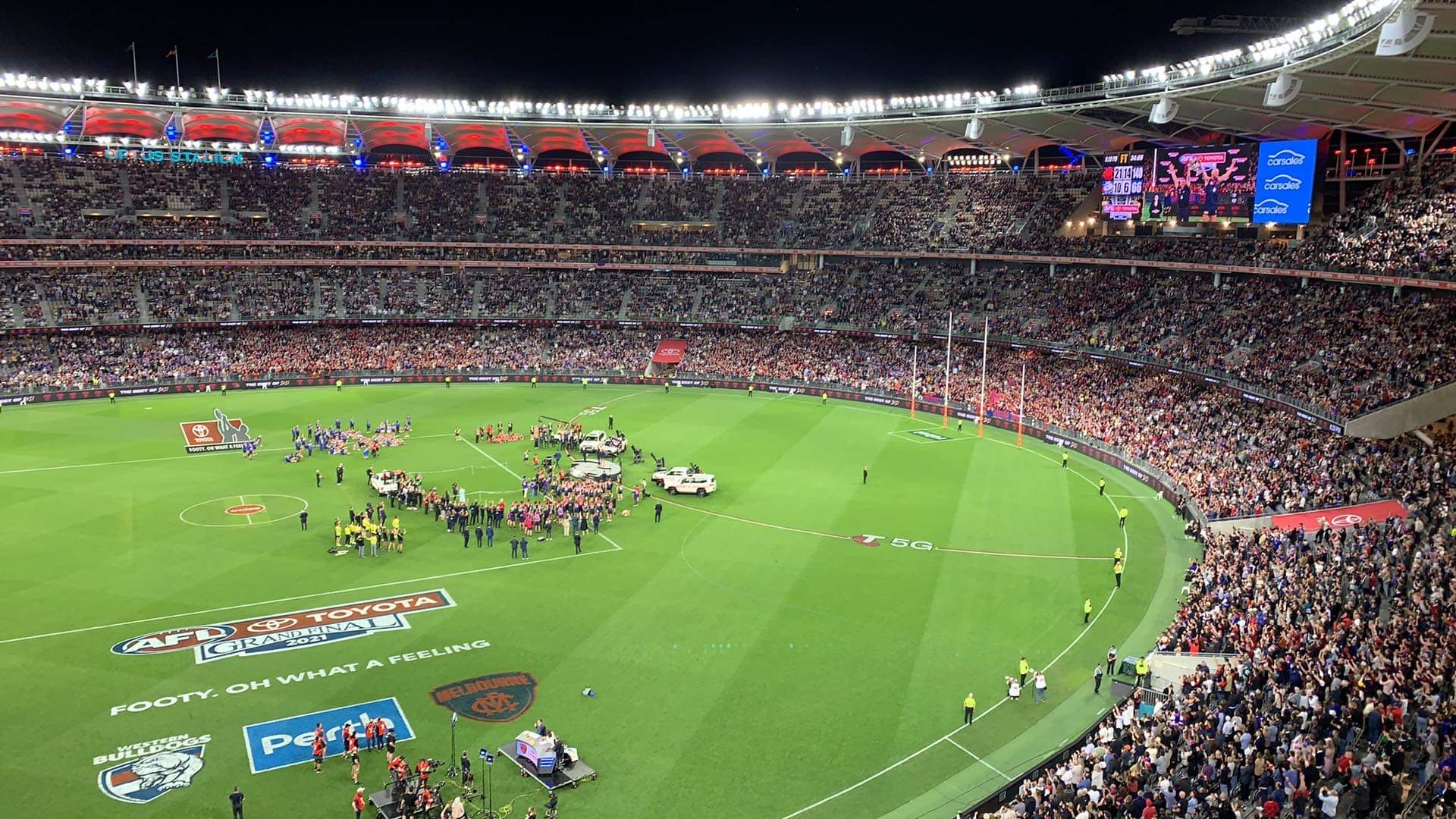
The 2021 AFL Grand Final at Optus Stadium.

The match sells out most years, and routinely qualifies as the world's most attended domestic sports championship event. The capacity of the Melbourne Cricket Ground is 100,024 and tickets to the game are allocated to different membership groups. In 2024, the allocations were: 35,000 tickets split evenly between members of the two competing clubs; 17,000 tickets to AFL members; 25,000 tickets to the AFL's stakeholders such as clubs, broadcast and corporate partners; and 23,000 tickets to Melbourne Cricket Club members in the ground's permanently dedicated members' reserve area. Where demand outstrips supply within one of those groups, tickets are usually allocated by ballot, and must be pre-purchased at prices ranging from $155 to $422 — with the exception of MCC members, who are entitled to gain free entry to the members' area on the day of the match without pre-purchase of tickets, or with pre-purchase of a $30 reserved seat.

=== History ===
As the largest venue in Melbourne, long-term contracts have secured the game at the Melbourne Cricket Ground since as early as the 1930s. The VFL resented its reliance on the arrangement, as the ground's government-appointed trust fixed admission prices, and the MCC took a large portion of the gate and retained free entry privileges for its members, an entitlement it had held since 1902. In the early 1950s, Princes Park was almost upgraded to become the Olympic Stadium, which would have provided an alternative venue; but when the Melbourne Cricket Ground was upgraded instead, it remained the only ground large enough to accommodate the game.

In the 1960s, the VFL constructed its own privately owned ground, VFL Park (later Waverley Park), to a capacity of 75,000. The league announced that it would move the grand final to VFL Park starting from 1984, and submitted plans to expand its ground's capacity to 104,500; but the upgrade was blocked by the state government, which even threatened to pass legislation requiring that the game remain at the Melbourne Cricket Ground. Eventually, the VFL, MCC and Victorian government negotiated for the game to remain at the Melbourne Cricket Ground, with better terms and access privileges for VFL members.

Since the expansion of the league interstate beyond Victoria, the long-term deals at the Melbourne Cricket Ground have been criticised as unfair for non-Victorian clubs, who play fewer games at the ground and are always forced to carry the travel burden of playing in the grand final.

== Schedule ==
The grand final is conventionally played on the afternoon of the last Saturday in September; it is often referred to in popular culture as the "One day in September", which is also the name of a famous football song. Since the introduction of the four-term school year to Victoria in 1987, it has fallen during the spring school holiday break; and, since 2015, the 'Friday before the AFL Grand Final' has been a gazetted public holiday in Victoria.

Occasionally, the match is scheduled for the first Saturday in October, and prior to the introduction of extra time to finals in 1991, any drawn finals matches would be replayed, delaying all subsequent finals by a week and pushing the grand final into October. The earliest grand final date has been 2 September in the war-shortened 1916 season, and in the 2000 season, which was scheduled early to avoid a clash with the Sydney Olympics. The latest grand final date has been 24 October, in the 2020 season, which was delayed by the COVID-19 pandemic.

Throughout its history, the grand final has remained scheduled for the traditional Saturday afternoon timeslot, most recently at 2:30pm AEST, even after night premiership football became common in the 1980s and when rival codes such as the NRL began regularly broadcasting the NRL Grand Final in the evening for primetime television. AFL CEO Gillon McLachlan has stated that it is out of respect for tradition that the afternoon timeslot has remained, even though playing in the twilight or night timeslots would attract more lucrative television deals.

The only exceptions to this were the two grand finals played outside Victoria, with each being played in the east-coast night timeslot: the pandemic-delayed 2020 grand final was moved to avoid a broadcasting clash with the Cox Plate, and the 2021 grand final in Perth was moved to avoid logistical issues surrounding a 12:30pm local start to meet the traditional timeslot.

=== Drawn games ===
Until the 2015 season, a drawn grand final would be replayed the following Saturday to decide the premiership. This occurred on three occasions: in 1948, 1977 and 2010. The provision to play extra time in the grand final in the event of a draw when regular time has expired was introduced in 2016, meaning that all future grand finals will be decided on the scheduled day.

In the event of a drawn game, the teams will play two extra time periods in full, each lasting three minutes plus time on, with a change of ends after the first period: if still tied, further pairs of extra time periods will be played in the same manner until a winner is determined. From 2016 to 2019, the periods were to have lasted five minutes plus time on, with a third untimed period of golden point extra time to have been played if the game remained tied after the first two periods. As of 2026, extra time has not yet been required to decide a grand final.

== Grand final traditions ==
=== Grand final parade ===
Since 1977, a grand final parade featuring the players from each team has been held around midday on the Friday before each grand final. The players have in the past appeared on parade floats it has become a motorcade of open-top vehicles, weather permitting. From its inception until 2014, the parade was based in the Melbourne city centre, usually proceeding along St Kilda Road, Swanston Street, Collins Street and ending at the steps of the Old Treasury Building. From 2015 (when the day of the parade became a public holiday) to 2019, the parade began at the Old Treasury Building, and headed down Spring Street and Wellington Parade, ending within Yarra Park outside the Melbourne Cricket Ground. Due to the COVID-19 pandemic, the 2020 and 2021 parades did not occur. In 2022, part of the parade saw the teams travel down the Yarra River on boats.

In the city centre, a parade featuring two Victorian teams in fine weather would generally attract in excess of 100,000 fans; attendances are typically lower in inclement weather or in the absence of Victorian clubs. On the first public holiday parade in 2015, a record 150,000 spectators attended.

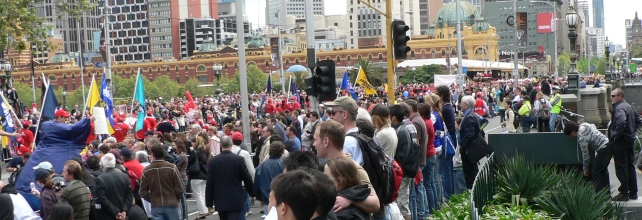
Some of the estimated 75,000 people who lined the streets of Melbourne for the 2006 AFL Grand Final parade

=== Grand Final Breakfast ===
The North Melbourne Grand Final Breakfast has been held annually since 1967 on the morning of the grand final. It is a corporate-style breakfast event, featuring keynote speakers and guests including prime ministers, state premiers and football celebrities. It is the most well-known corporate hospitality event associated with the grand final, and it rose to prominence in the 1970s when it was first televised across Victoria; it was endorsed by the VFL as the official pre-match function. Since then, the event has grown into a significant money raiser for the North Melbourne Football Club. Today, the breakfast is broadcast live on Fox Footy.

=== On-field entertainment ===
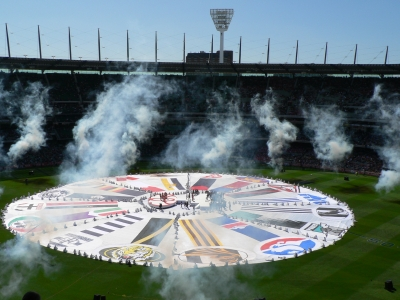
Pre-match entertainment at the 2006 AFL Grand Final.

Since the match was televised live in the late 1970s, many big Australian and international music stars have performed on the ground as part of pre-match, or occasionally half-time, entertainment. The pre-match entertainment has at times been criticised as uninspiring; and two performances in particular — Angry Anderson in 1991 and Meat Loaf in 2011 — are routinely mocked for the poor performances of the artists. On some occasions, the main pre-match/half-time entertainer has also performed a post-match entertainment set on the arena after the presentations and player celebrations have concluded, which is free and open to the general public.

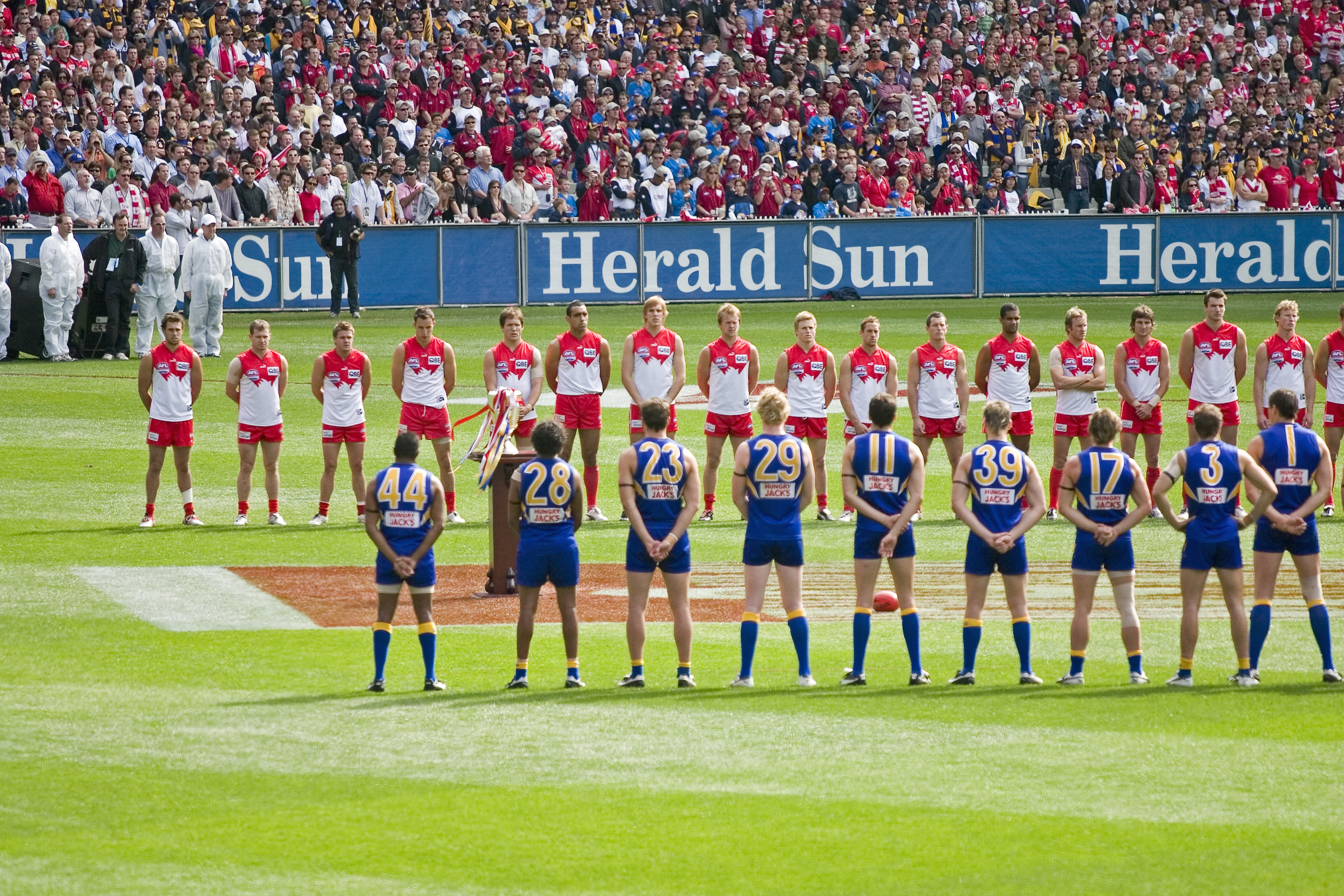
West Coast Eagles and Sydney Swans players lining up for the national anthem at the 2005 AFL Grand Final.

The pre-match entertainment frequently features traditional football and Australian songs performed live, including "Up There Cazaly", "One Day in September", "That's the Thing About Football", "Holy Grail", "Waltzing Matilda" and the competing teams' club songs. Each year, a motorcade is staged, in which players who have retired since the previous grand final are given a lap of honour in open top cars.

Curtain raiser matches are played on the main arena prior to the musical entertainment. Since 2008, this has been an under-16s or under-17s match, presently an exhibition match among the country's top under-17s players known as the AFL Futures match. Previously, the grand finals of the VFL/AFL reserves (1919–1999), VFL/AFL under-19s (from 1962 to 1991), and the Victorian statewide under-18s (from 1992 until 2007) were usually scheduled as one or two curtain raisers — although sometimes a drawn final and replay meant that a minor grade preliminary final, or no final at all, would be available as curtain raiser.

After the teams enter the arena, each team lines up for a team photograph on the ground. The national anthem is performed live when the teams and umpires are lined up on the wing.

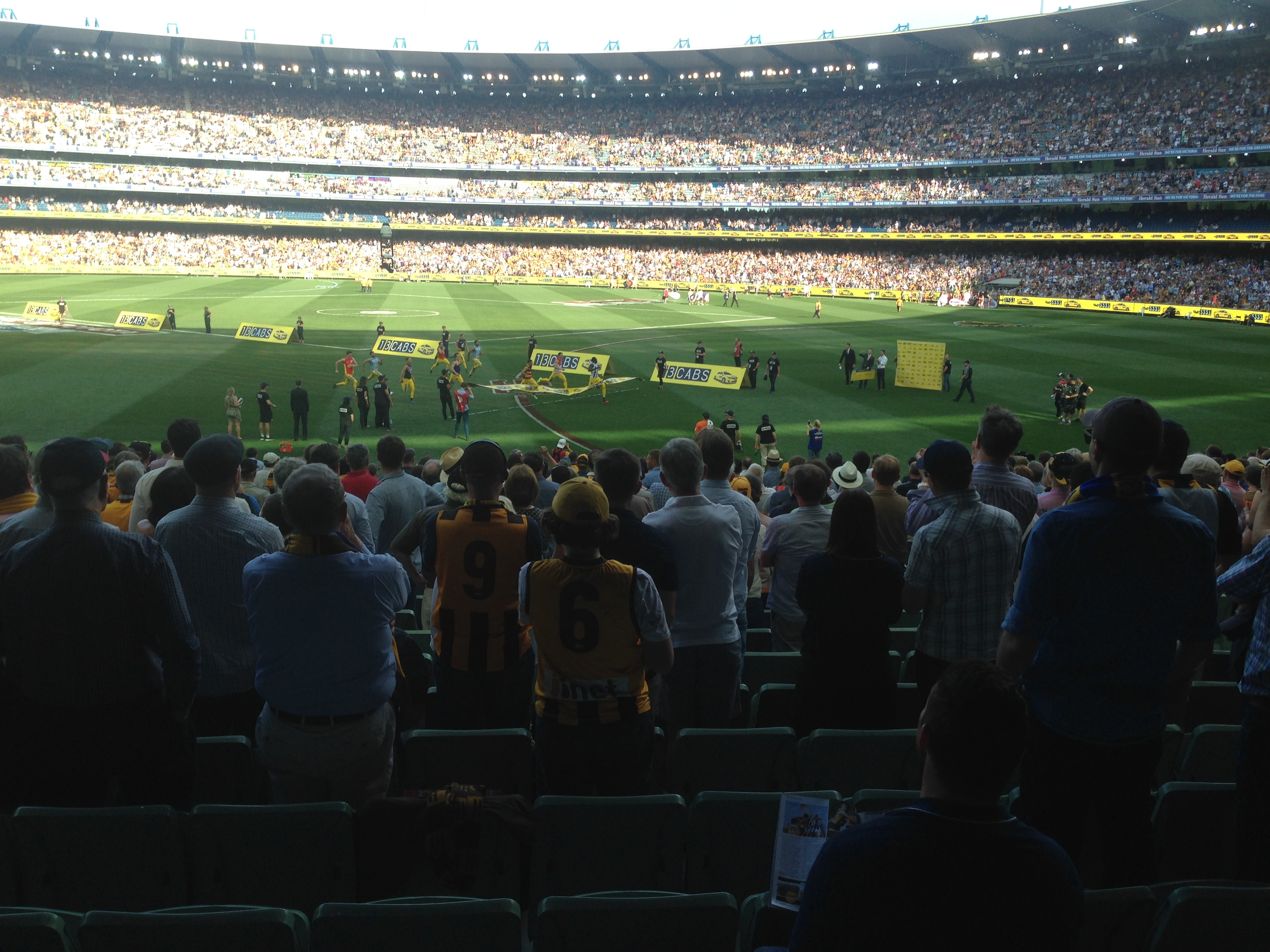
The 2015 Grand Final sprint as the competitors cross the finish line. Majak Daw of North Melbourne was the winner.

As part of the on-field entertainment, a sprint running race known as the AFL Grand Final Sprint is held on the field among players who are not taking part in the game. This was first established in 1979 and held each year until 1987 (except 1986) before being discontinued. It was re-established in 2002 and has been held each year since.

Since 2025, clubs have been permitted to play music and other goal celebrations over the public address system and on the scoreboard during the grand final, the same as they would have the right to do at their home matches.

=== Post-match customs ===
From as early as the 1940s until the 1980s, the long-standing soccer custom of opponents exchanging guernseys after the match was sometimes observed. This most infamously meant that photographs of St Kilda celebrating its only premiership in 1966 featured captain Darrel Baldock hoisting the trophy wearing a Collingwood guernsey; St Kilda later doctored the photo to put him back in a St Kilda guernsey in murals and promotional material it created with the image. The VFL banned the captains from swapping guernseys after 1966, and the custom eventually fell out of vogue altogether. Decades later, long-retired players often handed the guernseys back to their original wearers.

A premiership poster, generally showing a caricature of the winning club's mascot smiling gleefully, is produced and available for purchase after the match through the Herald Sun newspaper each year. First drawn in 1954 by The Herald cartoonist William Ellis Green (aka WEG), and since his death in 2008 by Herald Sun cartoonist Mark Knight, the posters are extremely popular with fans and collectors and sell over 100,000 copies each year.

== Famous moments in grand finals ==
Many famous, folkloric moments have occurred on the field throughout grand final history:

- 1903, Collingwood 4.7 (31) d. Fitzroy 3.11 (29) — on the final kick of the game, Fitzroy captain Gerald Brosnan had a set shot thirty metres from goal directly in front to win the game; his kick just grazed the outside of the goal post and the final bell sounded immediately after.
- 1910, Collingwood 9.7 (61) d. Carlton 6.11 (47) — the final quarter was marred by a massive brawl, sparked by a fight between Richard Daykin (Collingwood) and Jack Baquie (Carlton). Umpire Jack Elder settled matters by blowing his whistle and bouncing the ball, giving the players no option but to forget about the fight. Four players were suspended for a year or more, and the incident is considered to have initiated the long-standing Carlton–Collingwood rivalry.
- 1913, Fitzroy 7.14 (56) d. St Kilda 5.13 (43) — trailing by 25 points at three-quarter time, St Kilda rallied to narrow the margin to two points with four minutes remaining. Des Baird had an opportunity to put St Kilda in front after taking a mark, but he handballed to George Morrissey in a worse position who kicked a behind, often considered to be the error which swung the game in Fitzroy's favour.
- 1918, South Melbourne 9.8 (62) d. Collingwood 7.15 (57) — in the final seconds, trailing by a point, Gerald Ryan (South Melbourne) took a long running shot at goal which fell to a pack in the goal square; South Melbourne rover Chris Laird came rushing through and soccered the ball off the ground for the winning goal.

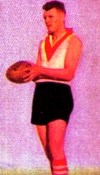
Star full-forward Bob Pratt missed the 1935 Grand Final after a vehicle accident.

- 1921, Richmond 5.6 (36) d. Carlton 4.8 (32) — in the Carlton forward line in the final minute, a pass to Alec Duncan (Carlton), who was close to goal, was intercepted from behind by Max Hislop (Richmond), who dashed away, kicking the ball as the final bell rang.
- 1927, Collingwood 2.13 (25) d. Richmond 1.7 (13) — unrelenting heavy rain meant that the game was played in atrocious conditions, with sheets of water inches deep over the ground. With only 38 points scored, it was the lowest-scoring VFL/AFL game, grand final or otherwise, in the 20th century.
- 1935, Collingwood 11.12 (78) d. South Melbourne 7.16 (58) — Bob Pratt, South Melbourne's star full-forward and league leading goalkicker of the previous three seasons, was forced to withdraw from the grand final after being clipped by a truck carrying a load of bricks two days before the game. Without him, South Melbourne lost by 20 points despite having as many scoring shots as Collingwood.

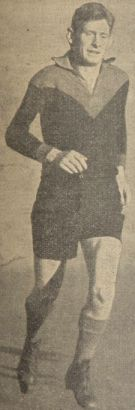
Norm Smith missed two chances to win the 1948 Grand Final. He won ten grand finals as player and coach, and the medal for best on ground is named in his honour.

- 1945, Carlton 15.13 (103) d. South Melbourne 10.15 (75) — marred by constant brawling and fighting, the 1945 grand final became known as the Bloodbath. Ten players were reported and received a combined 73 weeks of suspension, and it became the benchmark against which on-field violence was compared for many years.
- 1947, Carlton 13.8 (86) d. Essendon 11.19 (85) — inside the final minute, first-year player Fred Stafford (Carlton) kicked the winning goal for Carlton on his non-preferred foot after roving a boundary throw-in.
- 1948, Essendon 7.27 (69) drew Melbourne 10.9 (69) — inaccurate kicking saw Essendon fail to win despite fifteen more scoring shots than Melbourne, an equal record for any VFL/AFL game. Norm Smith (Melbourne) missed two chances in the final minute to win the game: a 45-metre running shot which went out of bounds, then fumbling clean possession from the throw-in due to interference from team-mate Don Cordner. Melbourne won the replay.
- 1960, Melbourne 8.14 (62) d. Collingwood 2.2 (14) — in a rain-affected game, Collingwood was held to its lowest score of the 20th century, grand final or otherwise, managing only six shots at goal for two lucky goals and two behinds.
- 1964, Melbourne 8.16 (64) d. Collingwood 8.12 (60) — with three minutes remaining, Melbourne back pocket Neil Crompton, who had drifted forward to follow his opponent against the coach's instructions, gathered the ball in a pack and kicked the winning goal. It was the only goal Crompton kicked in the last five seasons of his career from 1962 to 1966.
- 1966, St Kilda 10.14 (74) d. Collingwood 10.13 (73) — with scores level and 90 seconds remaining, 18-year-old St Kilda forward Barry Breen snapped the winning behind with an ugly kick from a ball-up in the forward pocket, securing St Kilda's first and only premiership.
- 1970, Carlton 17.9 (111) d. Collingwood 14.17 (101) — Carlton trailed by 44 points at half time, before fighting back to win, in large part due to nineteenth man Ted Hopkins, who was substituted onto the field at half time and kicked four goals. Only one team had ever previously won a VFL/AFL game from such a large half-time deficit. The game was seen by an enduring record attendance of 121,696, and it featured an iconic speckie taken by Alex Jesaulenko (Carlton) in the second quarter, after which the Alex Jesaulenko Medal for Mark of the Year is now named.
- 1972, Carlton 28.9 (177) d. Richmond 22.18 (150) — with a combined 327 points scored, the 1972 grand final was, at the time, the highest-scoring VFL/AFL game of all time, grand final or otherwise.
- 1977, North Melbourne 9.22 (76) drew Collingwood 10.16 (76) — trailing by 27 points at three-quarter time and having kicked only 11 behinds since quarter time, North Melbourne rallied with five final quarter goals to take a six-point lead. Ross Dunne (Collingwood) levelled the scores with 40 seconds remaining after converting a set shot from a strong pack mark 15 metres from goal.
- 1977 replay, North Melbourne 21.25 (151) d. Collingwood 19.10 (124) — trailing by 23 points in the final quarter, Phil Manassa (Collingwood) gathered the ball at the half-back flank, then ran all the way to the forward line with four bounces and baulking one opponent before kicking a goal from about 40 metres. Although Collingwood still lost the match, the goal remains famous, and the Phil Manassa Medal for Goal of the Year is now named after it.

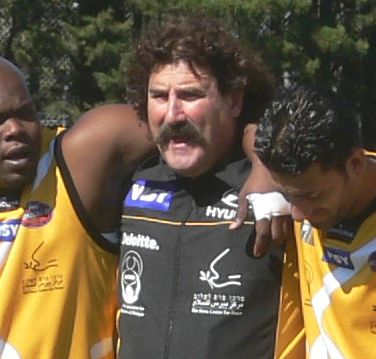
Robert DiPierdomenico played most of the brutal 1989 Grand Final with a punctured lung.

- 1979, Carlton 11.16 (82) d. Collingwood 11.11 (77) — with ten minutes remaining, Wayne Harmes (Carlton) kicked errantly towards goal, then chased down his own kick and punched it back towards the goal square just as it was about to go out of bounds in the forward pocket; teammate Ken Sheldon gathered in the goal square and kicked a goal to put Carlton 10 points ahead. Collingwood scored one more goal in the remaining time, but Sheldon's goal proved to be the winner.
- 1989, Hawthorn 21.18 (144) d. Geelong 21.12 (138) — noted for its roughness, Dermott Brereton (Hawthorn) was infamously knocked out by a solid shirtfront from Mark Yeates (Geelong) at the opening bounce; however, he played out the game in the forward line and kicked three goals despite internal bleeding. Robert DiPierdomenico (Hawthorn) played three quarters with a punctured lung, and many other players were hospitalised after the game. Hawthorn opened a 40-point lead by quarter time and still led by 36 points at three-quarter time; but with only twelve uninjured men, Hawthorn was almost overrun in the final quarter, with Geelong falling six points short.
- 1997, Adelaide 19.11 (125) d. St Kilda 13.16 (94) — after being moved into the midfield, but instructed to drift forward after each centre bounce, Adelaide's Darren Jarman kicked a record five final-quarter goals, helping Adelaide break away to win with an eight-goals-to-four final quarter.
- 2005, Sydney 8.10 (58) d. West Coast 7.12 (54) — with less than five seconds remaining, a long kick was placed deep into the West Coast forward line towards a pack of about eight players, with West Coast crumbers well placed around the pack, but the ball was cleanly marked by Sydney defender Leo Barry to secure the victory.

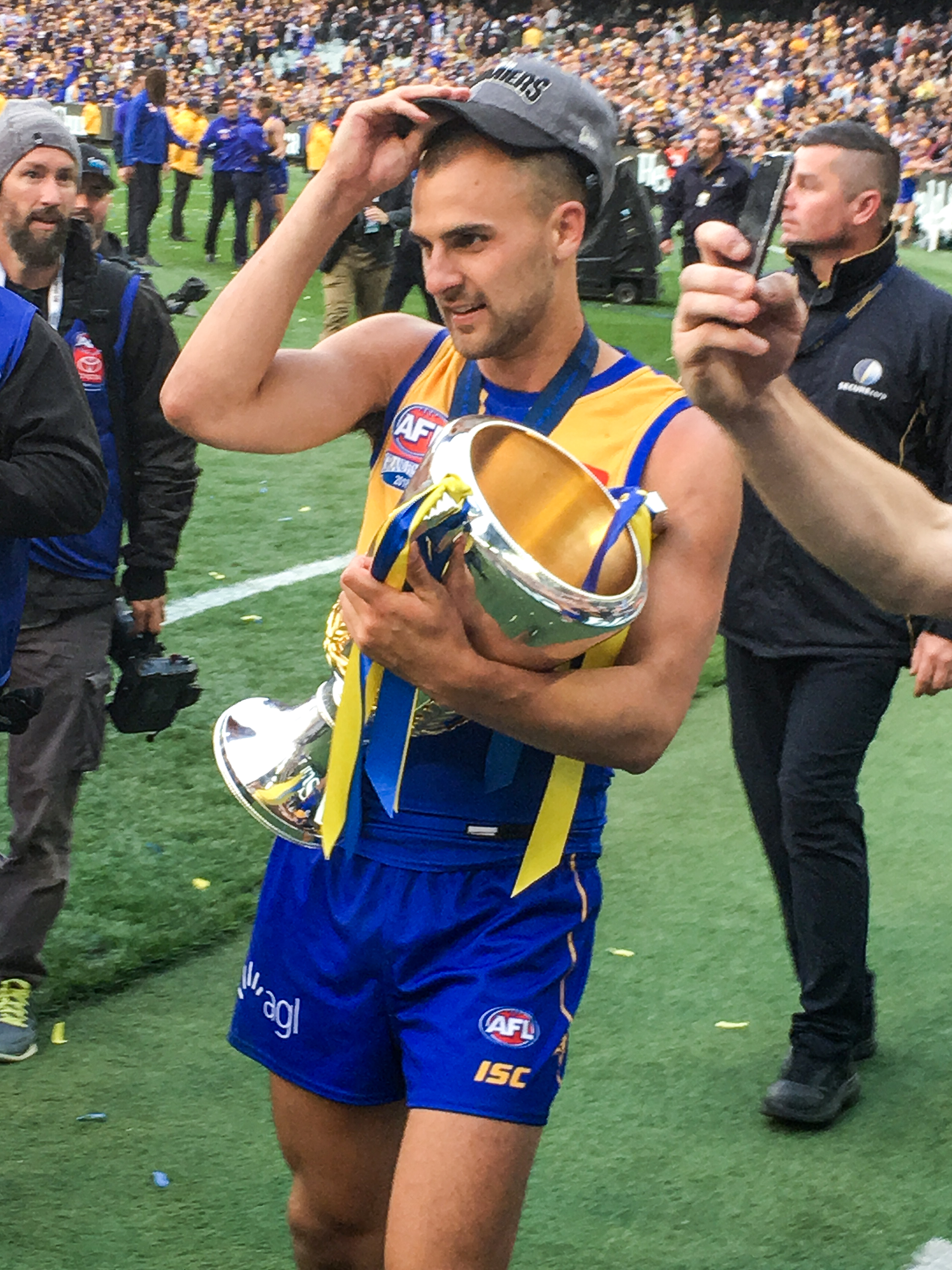
Dom Sheed, who kicked the winning goal in the 2018 Grand Final, with the premiership cup

- 2009, Geelong 12.8 (80) d. St Kilda 9.14 (68) — with scores level with less than four minutes remaining, an errant pass to Gary Ablett Jr. (Geelong) in the centre circle was broken up by Zac Dawson (St Kilda); against two St Kilda opponents, Matthew Scarlett (Geelong) was able to deftly toe-poke the ball off the bounce back to Ablett in space, and the ensuing play ended in a goal to Paul Chapman, giving Geelong a lead it never surrendered.
- 2010, Collingwood 9.14 (68) drew St Kilda 10.8 (68) — trailing by one point with 90 seconds remaining, a 60-metre running shot by Lenny Hayes (St Kilda) landed 10 metres in front of the right behind post, took one bounce 45° left toward the goal, then another bounce 90° right and went through for the tying behind, eluding St Kilda goalsneak Stephen Milne who could not gather the unpredictable ball. The match was drawn, and Collingwood won the replay.
- 2018, West Coast 11.13 (79) d. Collingwood 11.8 (74) — West Coast had trailed by 29 points in the first quarter, but they fought back to level the scores at three-quarter time. With less than three minutes remaining and trailing by two points, Dom Sheed (West Coast) kicked the winning goal from a difficult 40-metre set shot from near the right boundary line.
- 2026, Brisbane Lions 14.12 (96) d. Fremantle 12.17 (89) – Fremantle had kicked a goal to take a game-high 17-point lead with only 4:18 remaining on the game clock, and had enacted the "Wharfie Time" scoreboard call which it was allowed to use once per match to excite its fans; Brisbane then kicked four quick goals in the remaining four minutes to snatch victory.

== Television broadcast ==
Australian metropolitan television viewers
Year	Viewers	Rank	Network	Ref.
2001	2.604 million	3	Seven Network	
2002	2.626 million	3	Network Ten	
2003	2.966 million	4	Network Ten	
2004	2.796 million	3	Network Ten	
2005	3.386 million	2	Network Ten	
2006	3.145 million	2	Network Ten	
2007	2.563 million	1	Network Ten	
2008	2.491 million	2	Seven Network	
2009	2.878 million	3	Network Ten	
2010	2.768 million	4	Seven Network	
2010	2.687 million	6	Seven Network	
2011	2.641 million	7	Network Ten	
2012	2.962 million	4	Seven Network	
2013	2.717 million	3	Seven Network	
2014	2.828 million	1	Seven Network	
2015	2.645 million	1	Seven Network	
2016	3.081 million	2	Seven Network	
2017	2.680 million	1	Seven Network	
2018	2.615 million	2	Seven Network	
2019	2.219 million	1	Seven Network	
2020	3.011 million	1	Seven Network	
2021	3.051 million	1	Seven Network	
2022	2.179 million	3	Seven Network	
2023	2.465 million	4	Seven Network	

The grand final is one of the most-watched television events of the year in Australia. Since the introduction of the current OzTAM ratings system in 2001, the match has been the highest-rated program of the year four times across metropolitan audiences (2007, 2014, 2015 and 2017); and the post-game ceremony was the highest-rated program twice (2016 and 2018). The worldwide audience has grown substantially, with broadcasts being televised into 72 countries for an estimated audience of around 30 million.

When television was first introduced to Australia in 1956, the VFL was reluctant to broadcast the grand final into Victoria, fearful that crowd numbers would be affected. The grand final was first shown on television in 1961, shown as a replay starting an hour after the game itself had finished. Live telecasts were first allowed in Victoria in 1977, although live broadcasts interstate were permitted before that. The match has been broadcast live in colour into Victoria since that date, and consistently in high definition since 2015, by the following networks:

- Seven Network (1977–1986, 1988–2001, 2008, 2010, 2012–present)
- 7plus (2024–present)
- Network Ten (2002–2007, 2009, 2011)
- ABC and SportsPlay (1987)

Although the Nine Network held partial rights to the league's matches from 2002 until 2006, it has never broadcast the grand final.

The grand final is covered by anti-siphoning laws, ensuring it remains on free-to-air television in Australia. Some archival and newsreel footage for segments of grand finals prior to 1961 still exist, and video from the 1909 grand final is the earliest known surviving Australian football footage.

Figures for broadcasts were originally measured across the five metropolitan areas (Melbourne, Adelaide, Perth, Brisbane and Sydney) from 2001 to 2023. However, following changes to the TV ratings measurement system in Australia in 2024, metropolitan figures were replaced by a new nationwide 'Total TV' figure, which includes regional and broadcaster video on demand (BVOD) streaming numbers in a single figure.

The record under the five metropolitan cities measurement system was set in 2005 when Sydney defeated West Coast, while the total TV record was set in 2026 for the Fremantle vs Brisbane Lions match.

Australian total television viewers
Year	Viewers	Rank	Network	Ref.
2024	4.024 million	1	Seven Network	
2025	4.076 million	2	Seven Network	
2026	4.655 million	1	Seven Network	

=== International telecasts ===
The AFL grand final is televised into many countries, and grand final parties are held around the world.

- Papua New Guinea — EM TV, Australia Plus (live)
- New Zealand — Sky Sport (live) and TVNZ (live)
- Asia-Pacific — ABC Australia (live) (includes China, Hong Kong/Macau, Taiwan, Japan, South Korea, North Korea, Vietnam, Indonesia, Singapore, Thailand, Philippines, Palau, Malaysia, Cambodia, Burma/Myanmar, Laos, Brunei, Fiji, Western Samoa, Tonga, Cook Islands, Tuvalu, Timor-Leste(East Timor), Vanuatu, New Caledonia, Solomon Islands, Marshall Islands, Nauru, Micronesia, Kiribati)
- Indian subcontinent (India, Pakistan, Sri Lanka, Bangladesh, Nepal, Bhutan) — ABC Australia (live)
- China — GZTV (live)
- Middle East — Australia Plus and Orbit Showtime Network (live)
- Israel — Fox Sports Israel (live)
- North America
- United States — Fox Sports.
- Canada — TSN (live).
- United Kingdom and Ireland — TNT Sports (live)
- ALL of Europe — Eurosport 2 (live/delayed coverage to be confirmed)
- Africa — Kwesé Sports Orbit Showtime Network (live)
- Latin America and Caribbean — ESPN International (to be confirmed)
- Russia — Viasat (live)

== See also ==
- Grand final
- List of VFL/AFL premiers
- List of VFL/AFL premiership captains and coaches
- List of VFL/AFL Grand Final records
- AFL Women's Grand Final
- NRL Grand Final
