= Daykin =

Daykin is a surname. Notable people with the surname include:

- Bert Daykin, Australian rules footballer
- Christopher Daykin, British actuary
- Percy Daykin, Australian rules footballer
- Richard Daykin, Australian rules footballer
- Thomas Daykin, English footballer
- Tony Daykin, American football player

== See also ==
- Daykin, Nebraska, a village in Jefferson County
- Ahlswede–Daykin inequality, an inequality in statistical mechanics
- Alexander and Daykin, Millette Alexander and Frank Daykin, an American piano duo
