= Richard Daykin =

Australian rules footballer

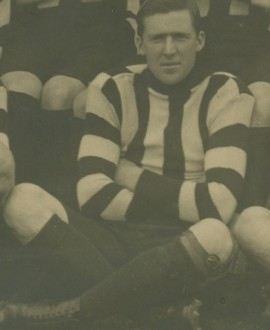
- Daykin in 1910

Personal information
- Full name: Richard Francis Daykin
- Born: 7 January 1887; Bendigo, Victoria
- Died: 1 September 1943 (aged 56); Bendigo, Victoria
- Original teams: Long Gully, South Bendigo
- Debut: Round 15, 1 August 1908, Collingwood vs. Richmond

Playing career^{1}
Years	Club	Games (Goals)
1908, 1910	Collingwood	21 (7)
- ^{1} Playing statistics correct to the end of 1910.

Career highlights
- Collingwood premiership player - 1910

Richard Francis Daykin (7 January 1887 – 1 September 1943) was an Australian rules footballer who played for Collingwood in the Victorian Football League (VFL).

Daykin played two seasons over three years for Collingwood in the VFL. His first season was in 1908 and after missing the 1909 season he returned to play in 1910.

Daykin was the rover in Collingwood's 1910 VFL premiership team, his last VFL game.

After the premiership win, Daykin was suspended for 12 months after confessing to his involvement in a second half melee with Carlton player Jack Baquie. Originally, based on umpire Jack Elder's testimony, it was Collingwood's Tom Baxter who was given the 12-month ban, but Daykin signed a declaration which stated that it was he, and not Baxter, that had struck Baquie. The VFL accepted the declaration and as Daykin had retired after the Grand Final win, no Collingwood player was suspended for the incident. This incident is said to be central to, or even the specific origin of, the long-standing rivalry which still exists between the clubs.

Daykin played in South Bendigo's 1912 Bendigo Football League premiership and was the league's leading goalkicker with 26 goals.

Three Daykin brothers were from South Bendigo with Richard, Percy and Bert all playing in VFL grand finals. Another brother, Robert played one game with South Melbourne in 1904.

== Links ==
- List of Australian rules football families
