= Tom Baxter (Australian footballer) =

Australian rules footballer (1884–1959)

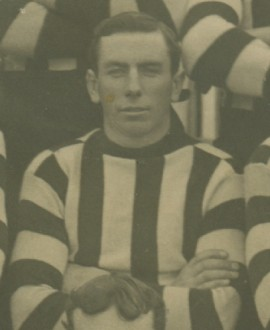
- Baxter in 1910

Personal information
- Full name: Thomas Matthew Baxter
- Born: 23 February 1884; Maldon, Victoria
- Died: 8 May 1959 (aged 75); Maldon, Victoria
- Original team: Maldon
- Height: 173 cm (5 ft 8 in)
- Weight: 73 kg (161 lb)
- Position: Rover

Playing career^{1}
Years	Club	Games (Goals)
1907–1911	Collingwood	89 (74)
1912	St Kilda	11 (7)
Total		100 (81)
- ^{1} Playing statistics correct to the end of 1912.

Thomas Matthew Baxter (23 February 1884 – 8 May 1959) was an Australian rules footballer who played with Collingwood and St Kilda in the Victorian Football League (VFL).

== Football ==
Baxter, originally from Maldon and also Long Gully in the Bendigo Football Association. In the 1910 VFL Grand Final between Carlton and Collingwood he was reported for striking by umpire Jack Elder, and suspended for the entire 1911 VFL season. Collingwood appealed the ban and it was overturned, after teammate Richard Daykin signed a declaration which stated that it was he and not Baxter who had struck Jack Baquie. As Daykin had retired after the Grand Final win, no player was suspended for the incident. This incident is said to be central to, or even the specific origin of, the long-standing rivalry which still exists between the clubs.

A rover, he performed well in 1911 and his 31 goals was enough to top Collingwood's goal-kicking. He finished the year in Collingwood's losing Grand Final team. His performance attracted controversy, with a widespread rumour hinting that he was bribed to play "dead". Baxter twice kicked into the man on the mark in the vital last quarter, as well as missing three easy chances to score a goal. Baxter asked the Collingwood committee to hold an inquiry, saying in his own defence that he had scored Collingwood's only goal of the last quarter, and was one of the few players to gain possession of the ball. The committee cleared Baxter of any wrongdoing, but he was cleared to St Kilda for the 1912 season.

In 1915, Baxter was cleared from Maldon to Castlemaine.

Returned to Maldon and played until he was 51. His Maldon jumper still hangs in the Maldon rooms.
