= 1910 VFL grand final =

Grand final of the 1910 Victorian Football League season

1910 VFL Grand Final
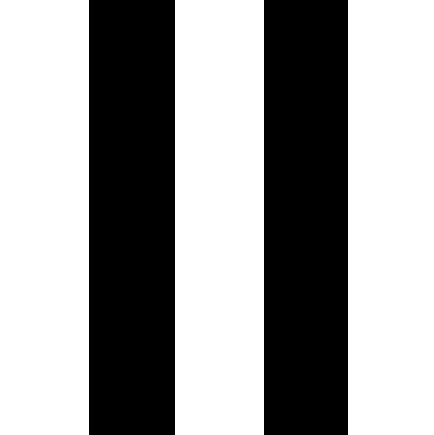

Collingwood	Carlton
9.7 (61)	6.11 (47)
	1	2	3	4
COLL	4.3 (27)	5.3 (33)	8.5 (53)	9.7 (61)
CAR	1.2 (8)	2.6 (18)	4.9 (33)	6.11 (47)
- Date: 1 October 1910
- Stadium: Melbourne Cricket Ground
- Attendance: 42,790

The 1910 VFL Grand Final was an Australian rules football game contested between the Collingwood Football Club and Carlton Football Club, held at the Melbourne Cricket Ground in Melbourne on 1 October 1910. It was the 13th annual Grand Final of the Victorian Football League, staged to determine the premiers for the 1910 VFL season. The match, attended by 42,790 spectators, was won by Collingwood by a margin of 14 points, marking that club's third premiership victory.

== Teams ==
Collingwood	Carlton

Collingwood
B:	Jim Sadler	Ted Rowell	Charlie Norris
HB:	Joe Scaddan	Jack Shorten	Duncan McIvor
C:	Percy Gibb	Jock McHale	Norm Oliver
HF:	George Angus (c)	Les Hughes	Dick Vernon
F:	Paddy Gilchrist	Dick Lee	Percy Wilson
Foll:	Dave Ryan	Richard Daykin	Tom Baxter
Coach:	George Angus		

Carlton
B:	Dick Harris	Doug Gillespie	Bill Goddard
HB:	Tom McCluskey	Billy Payne	Norm Clark
C:	Ernie Jamieson	Rod McGregor	Tom Clancy
HF:	Percy Sheehan	Jim Marchbank	Jack Baquie
F:	Andy McDonald	Vin Gardiner	Archie Wilson
Foll:	Jack Wells	Martin Gotz	Fred Elliott (c)
Coach:	Fred Elliott		

- Umpire – Jack Elder

== Statistics ==
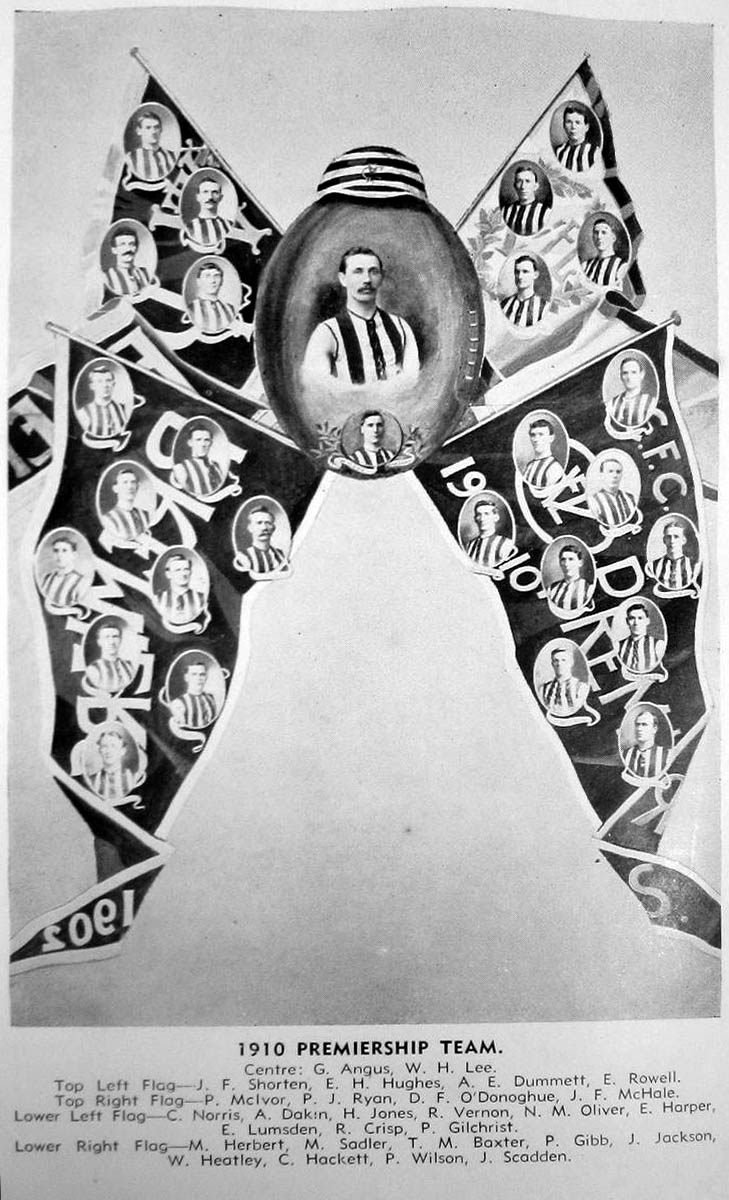
Colligwood players

=== Goalkickers ===
Collingwood:

- D Lee 4
- G Angus 1
- R Daykin 1
- P Gibb 1
- P Gilchrist 1
- D Vernon 1

Carlton:

- R McGregor 2
- J Baguie 1
- V Gardiner 1
- J Marchbank 1
- J Wells 1

== See also ==
- 1910 VFL season
