= Percy Daykin =

Australian rules footballer (1890–1965)

Personal information
- Full name: Percy Ernest Harold Daykin
- Born: 7 July 1890; Bendigo
- Died: 19 June 1965 (aged 74); Caulfield, Victoria
- Original team: South Bendigo
- Height: 174 cm (5 ft 9 in)
- Weight: 80 kg (176 lb)
- Position: Half forward flanker

Playing career^{1}
Years	Club	Games (Goals)
1914–21	Carlton (VFL)	134 (136)
1922	Brighton (VFA)	17 (23)
1923	Carlton Juniors (VJFL)	
1924–1925	Brighton (VFA)	25 (73)
Total		176 (232)

Coaching career^{3}
Years	Club	Games (W–L–D)
1922	Brighton (VFA)	18 (6–12–0)
1923	Carlton Juniors (VJFL)	14 (5–9–0)
- ^{1} Playing statistics correct to the end of 1925.^{3} Coaching statistics correct as of 1922.

Career highlights
- 4x VFL Grand Final player: (1914, 1915, 1916, and 1921); VFL premiership player: (1914 and 1915)

Percy Ernest Harold 'Dubs' Daykin (7 July 1890 – 19 June 1965) was an Australian rules footballer who played for Carlton in the Victorian Football League (VFL).

== Family ==
One of the ten children (two of whom had died in their infancy) of Robert Daykin (1855–1903), and Isabella Daykin (1858–1926), née Niffenecker, Percy Ernest Harold Daykin was born in Sandhurst, Victoria (now known as Bendigo) on 7 July 1890.

He married Hilda Myrtle Macdonald (1892–1961), in Bendigo, on 10 March 1914. They had eight children, two of whom died in their infancy. In December 1927, their eldest daughter, Isabel Frances Daykin (1916–1997), aged 11, saved her sister, Verna Daykin (1919–1983), aged 9, from drowning. Their son, Perce Stanley Daykin (1930-1999), a policeman, played VFA football with Brighton in 1951 and 1952.

=== Footballing brothers ===
His older brother, Robert Asquith Daykin (1881–1925) played in one match for South Melbourne in 1904. Another older brother, Richard Francis Daykin (1887–1943), who played in Collingwood's 1910 VFL grand final winning team, was a follower and forward from South Bendigo. Another of his older brothers, Albert Victor 'Red' Daykin (1888-1955), played for Essendon; and, as part of the 1908 VFL grand final losing team became the first of three Daykin brothers to appear in a VFL Grand Final — Percy played in four grand final matches with Carlton: in the winning teams of 1914 and 1915, and the losing teams of 1916 and 1921.

== Football ==
=== South Bendigo (BFL) ===
Daykin played in four Bendigo Football League premierships for the South Bendigo Football Club in 1909, 1910, 1911, and 1912. Daykin was also a member of South Bendigo's losing 1913 grand final side.

=== Carlton (VFL) ===
Daykin was recruited from South Bendigo in 1914, and he played in 134 matches for Carlton over eight seasons. A half forward flanker, he kicked 27 goals in 1919, 29 in 1920, and 27 again in 1921. Daykin competed in finals football in each of his eight seasons at Carlton; 16 finals matches in all, resulting in 13 goals.

=== Brighton (VFA) ===
He was appointed captain-coach of the VFA team Brighton for the 1922 season.

=== Carlton (VJFL) ===
In 1923, with Leo Sullivan (transferred from Brunswick) appointed coach of Brighton, Daykin served as the captain-coach of Carlton Juniors in the Victorian Junior Football League (VJFL).

=== Brighton (VFA) ===
He returned to Brighton in 1924, and played in 42 matches over three seasons (1922, 1924, and 1925), scoring 96 goals. He kicked seven goals for Brighton in match twice: against Northcote in July 1924, and against Port Melbourne in May 1925.

== Death ==
He died at Caulfield, Victoria on 19 June 1965.

== See also ==
- List of Australian rules football families
