= List of VFL/AFL Grand Final records =

This is a list of VFL/AFL Grand Final records, as they apply to the history of the VFL/AFL grand final between 1897 and the present day.

== Individual records ==
Individual Records
Most matches played (player)	11: Michael Tuck (Hawthorn) 10: Gordon Coventry (Collingwood), Albert Collier (Collingwood), Dick Reynolds (Essendon), Bill Hutchison (Essendon)
Most matches (captain)	9: Dick Reynolds (Essendon) 5: John Nicholls (Carlton), Michael Tuck (Hawthorn)
Most matches (coach)	17: Jock McHale (Collingwood) 12: Dick Reynolds (Essendon) 11: Frank 'Checker' Hughes (Richmond/Melbourne) 10: Tom Hafey (Richmond/Collingwood)
Most matches (umpire)	11: Matt Stevic 2012, 2014, 2015, 2016, 2017, 2018, 2019, 2020, 2021, 2022, 2023 10: Jack Elder (1908–22) 9: Ian Robinson(1973–87) 9: Brett Rosebury 2009, 2010 + replay, 2011, 2012, 2013, 2015, 2018, 2021
Most matches (player/coach)	20: Jock McHale (Collingwood) 17: Ron Barassi (Melbourne/Carlton/North Melbourne) 14: Frank 'Checker' Hughes (Richmond/Melbourne), Norm Smith (Melbourne) 14
Most wins (player)	7: Michael Tuck (Hawthorn) 6: Albert Collier (Collingwood), Harry Collier (Collingwood), Frank 'Bluey' Adams (Melbourne), Ron Barassi (Melbourne)
Most wins (captain)	4: Dick Reynolds (Essendon), Syd Coventry (Collingwood), Michael Tuck (Hawthorn)
Most wins (coach)	8: Jock McHale (Collingwood) 6: Norm Smith (Melbourne) 5: Jack Worrall (Carlton/Essendon), F 'Checker' Hughes (Richmond/Melbourne)
Most losses (player)	6: Jack Titus (Richmond) 5: Dick Reynolds (Essendon), Bill Hutchison (Essendon), Rene Kink (Collingwood/Essendon), Thomas O'Halloran (Richmond), Jack Dyer (Richmond), Jack Bissett (Richmond/South Melbourne)
Most losses (captain)	4: Dick Reynolds (Essendon) 3: Jack Bissett (South Melbourne), Jack Dyer (Richmond)
Most losses (coach)	9: Jock McHale (Collingwood) 7: Dick Reynolds (Essendon) 5: Allan Jeans (St Kilda/Hawthorn), Tom Hafey (Richmond/Collingwood)
First VFL/AFL game in GF	Harry Prout (Essendon) 1908, Bill James (Richmond) 1920, George Rawle (Essendon) 1923, F 'Pop' Vine (Melbourne) 1926, Ken Batchelor (Collingwood) 1952, Marlion Pickett (Richmond) 2019
Most games before first GF	313: Paul Roos (Fitzroy/Sydney) 1996 304: Shane Crawford (Hawthorn) 2008 293: Paul Williams (Collingwood/Sydney) 2005 290: Matthew Pavlich (Fremantle) 2013 281: Matthew Boyd (Western Bulldogs) 2016
Most Norm Smith Medals	3: Dustin Martin (Richmond) 2: Gary Ayres (Hawthorn), Andrew McLeod (Adelaide), Luke Hodge (Hawthorn), Will Ashcroft (Brisbane)
Most possessions in a match	39: Simon Black (Brisbane) 2003, Christian Petracca (Melbourne) 2021 37: Kane Cornes (Port Adelaide) 2007, Jordan Lewis (Hawthorn) 2014, Matt Crouch (Adelaide) 2017, Caleb Daniel (Western Bulldogs) 2021 36: Geoff Raines (Richmond) 1980, Robert Harvey (St Kilda) 1997, Peter Burgoyne (Port Adelaide) 2007 35: Daryn Cresswell (Sydney) 1996, Luke Hodge (Hawthorn) 2014
Most goals (career)	35: Gordon Coventry (Collingwood) 25: Dermott Brereton (Hawthorn) 23: Jason Dunstall (Hawthorn), Jack Mueller (Melbourne)
Most goals in a match	9: Gordon Coventry (Collingwood) 1928, Gary Ablett Sr. (Geelong) 1989 8: Dermott Brereton (Hawthorn) 1985
Most goals in a quarter	5: Darren Jarman (Adelaide) 1997, Q4
Most behinds in a match	10: Ron Todd (Collingwood) 1936 8: Bob Pratt (South Melbourne) 1933, John Hendrie (Hawthorn) 1976

== Team records ==
Game records
Highest score	28.9 (177)	by Carlton vs Richmond 1972
Lowest score	1.7 (13)	by Richmond vs Collingwood 1927
Highest aggregate	327 points	Carlton vs Richmond 1972
Lowest aggregate	38 points	Collingwood vs Richmond 1927
Highest winning margin	119 points	by Geelong vs Port Adelaide 2007
Lowest winning margin	1 point	by Fitzroy vs South Melbourne 1899, by Carlton vs Essendon 1947, by St Kilda vs Collingwood 1966, by West Coast vs Sydney 2006
Drawn games	1948 1977 2010	Essendon vs Melbourne (Melbourne won replay) Collingwood vs North Melbourne (North Melbourne won replay) Collingwood vs St Kilda (Collingwood won replay)
Highest losing score	22.18 (150)	by Richmond vs Carlton 1972
Lowest winning score	2.13 (25)	by Collingwood vs Richmond 1927
Highest attendance	121,696	Collingwood vs Carlton 1970
Lowest attendance	4,823	Fitzroy vs South Melbourne 1899
Highest score – 1st Qtr	8.4 (52)	by Hawthorn vs Geelong 1989, by Carlton vs Richmond 1972
Highest score – 2nd Qtr	10.2 (62)	by Carlton vs Richmond 1972
Highest score – 3rd Qtr	11.8 (74)	by Essendon vs Melbourne 1946
Highest score – 4th Qtr	11.3 (69)	by Essendon vs Hawthorn 1985
Biggest comeback – Quarter time	29	by Carlton vs Collingwood 1970
Biggest comeback – Half time	44	by Carlton vs Collingwood 1970
Biggest comeback to win – Three Quarter time	23	by Essendon vs Hawthorn 1984
Biggest comeback to draw – Three Quarter time	27	by North Melbourne vs Collingwood 1977
Premiership from lowest ladder position	7th	by Western Bulldogs vs Sydney 2016
Consecutive premierships	2	by Adelaide 1997, 1998, Carlton 1914, 1915 & 1981, 1982, Collingwood 1902, 1903 & 1935, 1936, Essendon 1911, 1912 & 1923, 1924 & 1949, 1950 & 1984, 1985, Fitzroy 1898, 1899 & 1904, 1905, Geelong 1951, 1952, Hawthorn 1988, 1989, Melbourne 1959, 1960, Richmond 1920, 1921 & 1973, 1974 & 2019, 2020
Consecutive premierships	3	by Brisbane 2001, 2002, 2003, & 2024, 2025, 2026, Carlton 1906, 1907, 1908, Hawthorn 2013, 2014, 2015, Melbourne 1939, 1940, 1941, & 1955, 1956, 1957
Consecutive premierships	4	by Collingwood 1927, 1928, 1929, 1930

== See also ==
- AFL Grand Final
- List of VFL/AFL records
