= Les Abbott =

Australian rules footballer

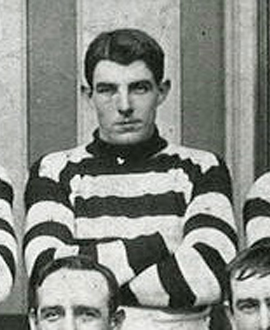
- Abbott in 1909 at Brunswick

Personal information
- Full name: Leslie Pearce Abbott
- Born: 9 June 1885; Collingwood, Victoria
- Died: 28 September 1947 (aged 62); Coburg, Victoria
- Original team: Port Melbourne (VFA)
- Position: Fullback

Playing career^{1}
Years	Club	Games (Goals)
1903	Port Melbourne (VFA)	2 (0)
1904	Collingwood	1 (0)
1905	Carlton	1 (0)
1905–10	Brunswick (VFA)	22 (0)
1910–11	Richmond	31 (0)
1912	Melbourne	3 (0)
1912	South Melbourne	3 (0)
1913	North Melbourne (VFA)	2 (0)
Total		39 (0)
- ^{1} Playing statistics correct to the end of 1913.

Leslie Pearce Abbott (9 June 1885 – 28 September 1947) was an Australian rules footballer who played with Collingwood, Carlton, Richmond, Melbourne, and South Melbourne. He was the first player to play for five different Victorian Football League (VFL) clubs. He also played for Port Melbourne, Brunswick and North Melbourne in the Victorian Football Association (VFA).

== Statistics ==
Legend
G	Goals	K	Kicks	D	Disposals	T	Tackles
B	Behinds	H	Handballs	M	Marks

Season	Team	No.	Games	Totals							Averages (per game)							Votes
Season	Team	No.	Games	G	B	K	H	D	M	T	G	B	K	H	D	M	T	Votes
1904	Collingwood	—N/a	1	0	—N/a	—N/a	—N/a	—N/a	—N/a	—N/a	0.0	—N/a	—N/a	—N/a	—N/a	—N/a	—N/a	0
1905	Carlton	—N/a	1	0	—N/a	—N/a	—N/a	—N/a	—N/a	—N/a	0.0	—N/a	—N/a	—N/a	—N/a	—N/a	—N/a	0
1910	Richmond	—N/a	14	0	—N/a	—N/a	—N/a	—N/a	—N/a	—N/a	0.0	—N/a	—N/a	—N/a	—N/a	—N/a	—N/a	0
1911	Richmond	—N/a	17	0	—N/a	—N/a	—N/a	—N/a	—N/a	—N/a	0.0	—N/a	—N/a	—N/a	—N/a	—N/a	—N/a	0
1912	Melbourne	27	3	0	—N/a	—N/a	—N/a	—N/a	—N/a	—N/a	0.0	—N/a	—N/a	—N/a	—N/a	—N/a	—N/a	0
1912	South Melbourne	26	3	0	—N/a	—N/a	—N/a	—N/a	—N/a	—N/a	0.0	—N/a	—N/a	—N/a	—N/a	—N/a	—N/a	0
Career			39	0	—N/a	—N/a	—N/a	—N/a	—N/a	—N/a	0.0	—N/a	—N/a	—N/a	—N/a	—N/a	—N/a	0
