= Dick Vernon =

Australian rules footballer and field umpire

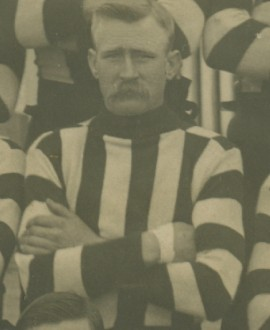
- Vernon in 1910

Personal information
- Full name: Richard Edward Vernon
- Born: 28 December 1878; Eddington, Victoria
- Died: 18 January 1954 (aged 75); Croxton, Victoria
- Original team: Boulder City
- Position: Rover/Forward

Playing career^{1}
Years	Club	Games (Goals)
1909–1911	Collingwood	51 (12)
- ^{1} Playing statistics correct to the end of 1911.

Richard Edward Vernon (28 December 1878 – 18 January 1954) was an Australian rules footballer who played for Collingwood in the Victorian Football League (VFL).

Vernon joined Collingwood from Boulder City in the Goldfields Football Association, which he captained in 1906 and played as a rover. He participated in finals at Collingwood in each of his three seasons and was a half forward flanker in their 1910 premiership team. Vernon also played in the losing 1911 Grand Final side.

In 1912, the season after he retired, Vernon umpired four VFL matches during the year as a field umpire.
