= Edwin Lionel Wilson =

English football administrator (1861-1951)

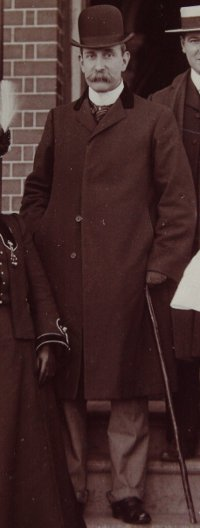
Edwin Lionel Wilson

Edwin Lionel Wilson (E. L Wilson) (28 March 1861 – 24 November 1951), along with Alan Mansfield, was the founder of Collingwood Football Club. Wilson was approached by the newly formed club to be appointed president, which he rejected. He went on to become the first secretary of the Collingwood Football Club and also the first secretary of the Victorian Football League when the VFL was established in 1897. He held the position of secretary of the VFL for 34 years from 1897 to 1929.

In 1930, the E. L. Wilson Shield was created to be awarded to each year's premiership-winning team. It was initially discontinued in 1978 when there was no room remaining on the shield, but it was expanded and reintroduced as a perpetual trophy in 2016 after it was rediscovered under a stairwell at AFL House.

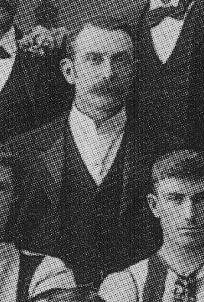
Collingwood's E.L. Wilson

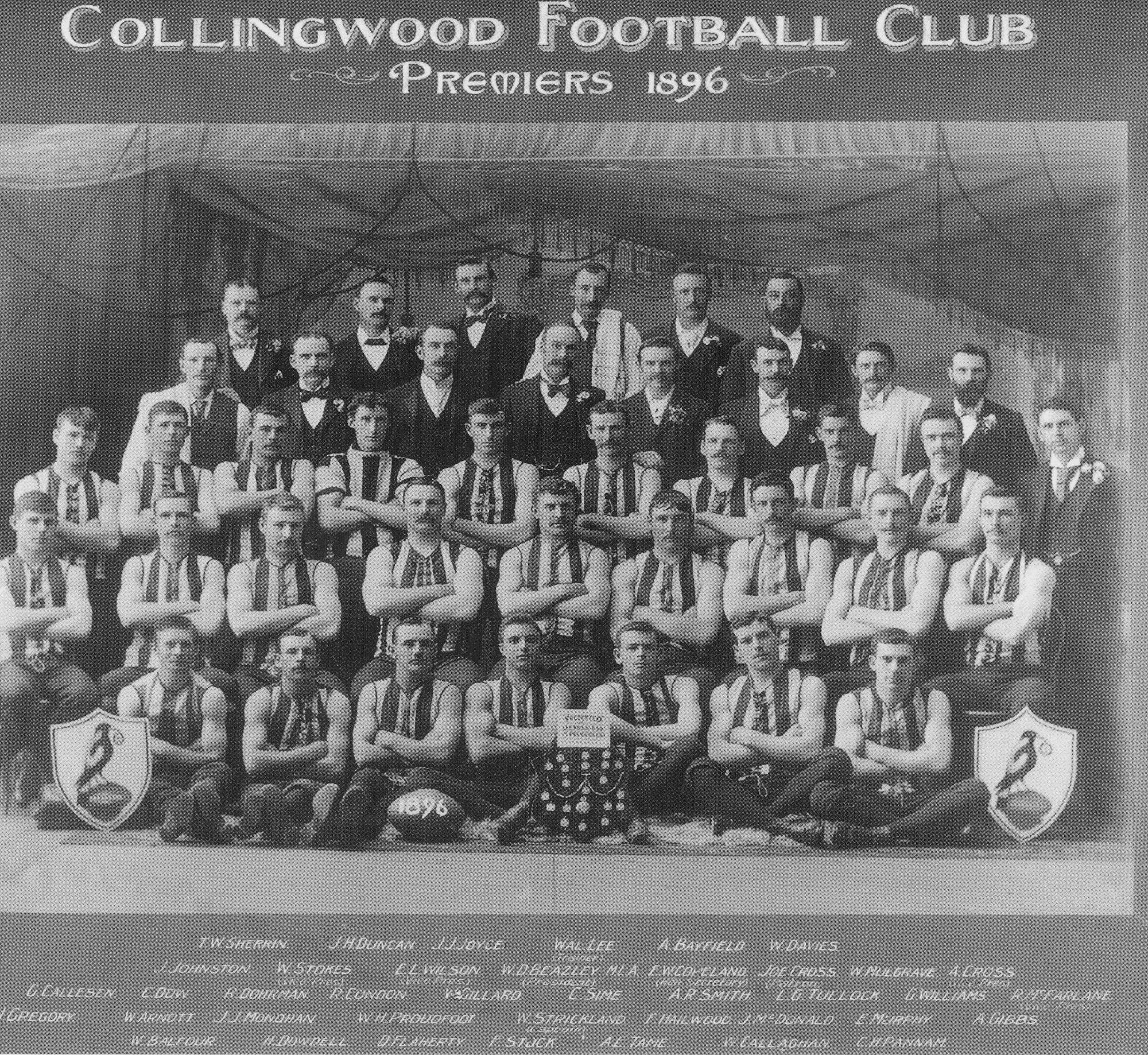
Collingwood premiership team
