= Bert Daykin =

Australian rules footballer (1888–1955)

Personal information
- Full name: Albert Victor Daykin
- Born: 25 July 1888; Bendigo, Victoria
- Died: 19 June 1955 (aged 66); Bendigo, Victoria
- Original team: South Bendigo
- Positions: Follower, Forward

Playing career^{1}
Years	Club	Games (Goals)
1908–10	Essendon	32 (9)
- ^{1} Playing statistics correct to the end of 1910.

Albert Victor 'Red' Daykin (25 July 1888 – 19 June 1955) was an Australian rules footballer who played for Essendon in the Victorian Football League (VFL).

Daykin was a follower and forward from South Bendigo who in 1908 became the first of three brothers to appear in a VFL Grand Final. One of those brothers, Percy, was a dual Carlton premiership player and another, Richard, played in Collingwood's 1910 premiership team.

Playing on this occasion from the back pocket, Daykin finished on the losing team in the 1908 VFL Grand Final.

After three seasons with Essendon, Daykin joined Goldfields Football League club Mines Rovers and played there until 1913. He represented the Western Australian interstate team at the 1911 Adelaide Carnival.
