= Andy McDonald (footballer) =

Australian rules footballer

Personal information
- Full name: Andrew James Thomas McDonald
- Born: 27 December 1885; Footscray, Victoria
- Died: 12 May 1967 (aged 81); Parkville, Victoria
- Original team: Yarraville
- Height: 165 cm (5 ft 5 in)
- Weight: 67 kg (148 lb)
- Position: Utility

Playing career^{1}
Years	Club	Games (Goals)
1910–19	Carlton	146 (34)
- ^{1} Playing statistics correct to the end of 1919.

Andy McDonald (27 December 1885 – 12 May 1967) was an Australian rules footballer who played for Carlton in the Victorian Football League (VFL) during the 1910s.

McDonald was recruited to Carlton from Yarraville and kicked 19 goals in his debut season. He would play in a losing Grand Final at the end of the year, the first of four VFL Grand Finals that he appeared in. Premierships came in 1914 and 1915, while he was a member of the Carlton team which lost the 1916 premiership decider.
