= Jack Baquie =

Australian rules footballer

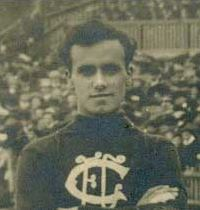
- Baquie during his Carlton career

Personal information
- Full name: John Alfred Baquie
- Born: 10 July 1886; Carlton, Victoria
- Died: 1 January 1968 (aged 81); Parkville, Victoria
- Original team: Brunswick (VFA)
- Height: 178 cm (5 ft 10 in)
- Weight: 73 kg (161 lb)
- Positions: Rover, forward

Playing career^{1}
Years	Club	Games (Goals)
1907–08, 1914–15, 1919–20	Melbourne	49 (14)
1909–10, 1912–13	Carlton	42 (20)
Total		91 (34)
- ^{1} Playing statistics correct to the end of 1920.

John Alfred Baquie (10 July 1886 – 1 January 1968) was an Australian rules footballer who played with Melbourne and Carlton in the Victorian Football League (VFL).

Baquie, who came to Melbourne from Victorian Football Association (VFA) club Brunswick, was used as both a forward and rover during his league career. Baquie made his VFL debut in 1907 for Melbourne, playing 13 games before leaving mid-season 1908 to play for Maffra Football Club in the Gippsland Football Association, returning for Melbourne's final match of 1908.

Described as a clever footballer with a "dashing, soaring style that thrills a crowd", Baquie transferred to Carlton in 1909 and participated in their losing 1909 and 1910 Grand Final sides. In the second quarter of the 1909 Grand Final he badly injured his ankle and left the field, but although "crippled" by the injury, he eventually returned in the third quarter to stand in the forward pocket, although he played little part in the remainder of the match.

During the last quarter of the 1910 premiership decider, Baquie was involved in a "general melee" which did not stop until "three or four policemen and some civilians" ran onto the ground to break-up the fight, but not before he was left unconscious for some time. Baquie was reported by the umpire Jack Elder for striking and was suspended for the entire 1911 VFL season. Baquie unsuccessfully appealed the suspension and, after speculation he would play for Moorabbin in the Federal Football League, spent the year with North East Football Association club Seymour but returned to Carlton for the 1912 finals series.

Baquie had an interrupted 1913, missing matches due to the illness and death of his father.

In 1914 Baquie returned to Melbourne and played until 1920. In a 1915 match against St Kilda he was again involved in an onground melee. During the last quarter, in a situation described as "simply disgraceful" with "men tearing each other down like savages", Baquie was one of three players knocked out. Following the match there was "an unseemly brawl" in the grandstand for about ten minutes.

Baquie worked for Victorian Railways and represented Victoria in the Australian Railways Football Association's annual Interstate Railway Carnival, football matches between teams representing the Railway Departments of South Australia, Victoria, and New South Wales. Baquie played in the 1913 and 1921 carnivals, both held in Adelaide. At the 1921 Carnival, Baquie was badly injured in the match against South Australia and it was feared he would never play again.

Baquie's brother played for St Kilda's reserves side in 1924.
