= Tom Clancy (Australian footballer) =

Australian rules footballer

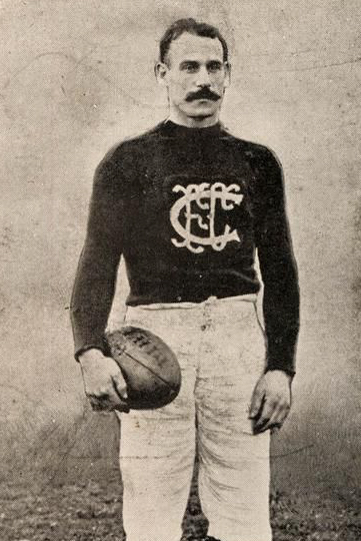
- Clancy in 1910

Personal information
- Full name: Thomas Albert Clancy
- Born: 11 April 1887; Carlton, Victoria
- Died: 23 April 1957 (aged 70); Richmond, Victoria
- Original team: Williamstown (VFA)
- Height: 175 cm (5 ft 9 in)
- Weight: 65 kg (143 lb)
- Position: Wing

Playing career^{1}
Years	Club	Games (Goals)
1908	South Melbourne	1 (0)
1910–14	Carlton	74 (10)
1915–16	Collingwood	18 (0)
Total		93 (10)
- ^{1} Playing statistics correct to the end of 1916.

Thomas Clancy (11 April 1887 – 23 April 1957) was an Australian rules footballer who played for South Melbourne, Carlton and Collingwood in the Victorian Football League (VFL).

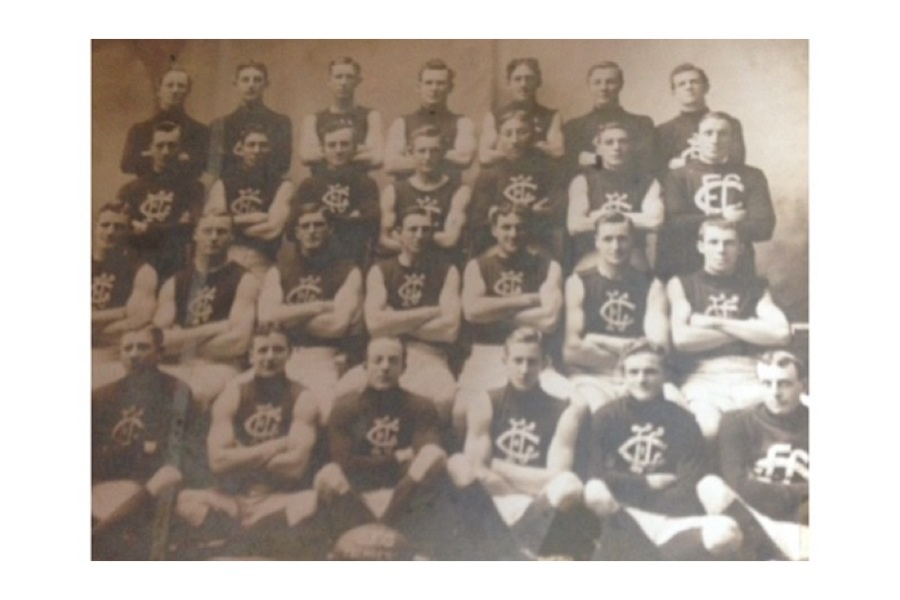
Tom Clancy (top left).

== Football ==
Clancy could manage only one appearance at South Melbourne in 1908 after being recruited from the local Leopold team. He transferred to Williamstown in the VFA before clearances closed at the end of June and played 8 games without kicking a goal for 'Town in 1908 and 1909.

He resurrected his career when he came to Carlton and he was a regular in their team from 1910 to 1914.

Clancy was a losing Grand Finalist in his first year at the club and when he was not picked in their side for the 1914 premiership decider, owing to a disagreement with the coach, he left and joined Collingwood.

He participated in the 1915 Grand Final with Collingwood, in his favourite position of wingman but again finished on the losing team.
