= Jack Shorten (Australian rules footballer) =

Australian rules footballer

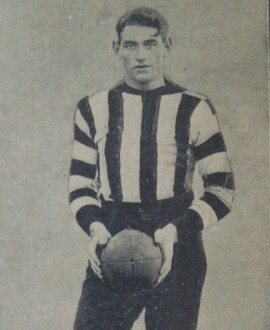
- Shorten in 1910

Personal information
- Full name: John Francis Shorten
- Born: 30 November 1887; Williamstown, Victoria
- Died: 9 October 1958 (aged 70); Sunshine, Victoria
- Original team: Royal Australian Artillery
- Height: 183 cm (6 ft 0 in)
- Weight: 83 kg (183 lb)
- Position: Defender

Playing career^{1}
Years	Club	Games (Goals)
1909–10, 1912–13	Collingwood	60 (0)
- ^{1} Playing statistics correct to the end of 1913.

John 'Jack' Shorten (30 November 1887 – 9 October 1958) was an Australian rules footballer who played for Collingwood in the Victorian Football League (VFL).

Shorten was the centre half back in Collingwood's 1910 premiership team. His involvement in a second half melee kept him out of action for the entire 1911 season as he received a 28 games suspension for striking, exactly the same punishment handed out to Carlton's Percy Sheehan. It remains the longest suspension ever for a Collingwood player.
