= Robert Daykin =

Australian rules footballer

Personal information
- Full name: Robert Asquith Daykin
- Born: 1 January 1881; Bendigo, Victoria
- Died: 4 June 1925 (aged 44); Golden Square, Victoria
- Original team: Golden Square / South Bendigo

Playing career^{1}
Years	Club	Games (Goals)
1904	South Melbourne	1 (0)
- ^{1} Playing statistics correct to the end of 1904.

Robert Asquith Daykin (1 January 1881 – 4 June 1925) was an Australian rules footballer who played with South Melbourne in the Victorian Football League (VFL).
