= 1912 VFL season =

16th season of the Victorian Football League (VFL)

1912 VFL premiership season
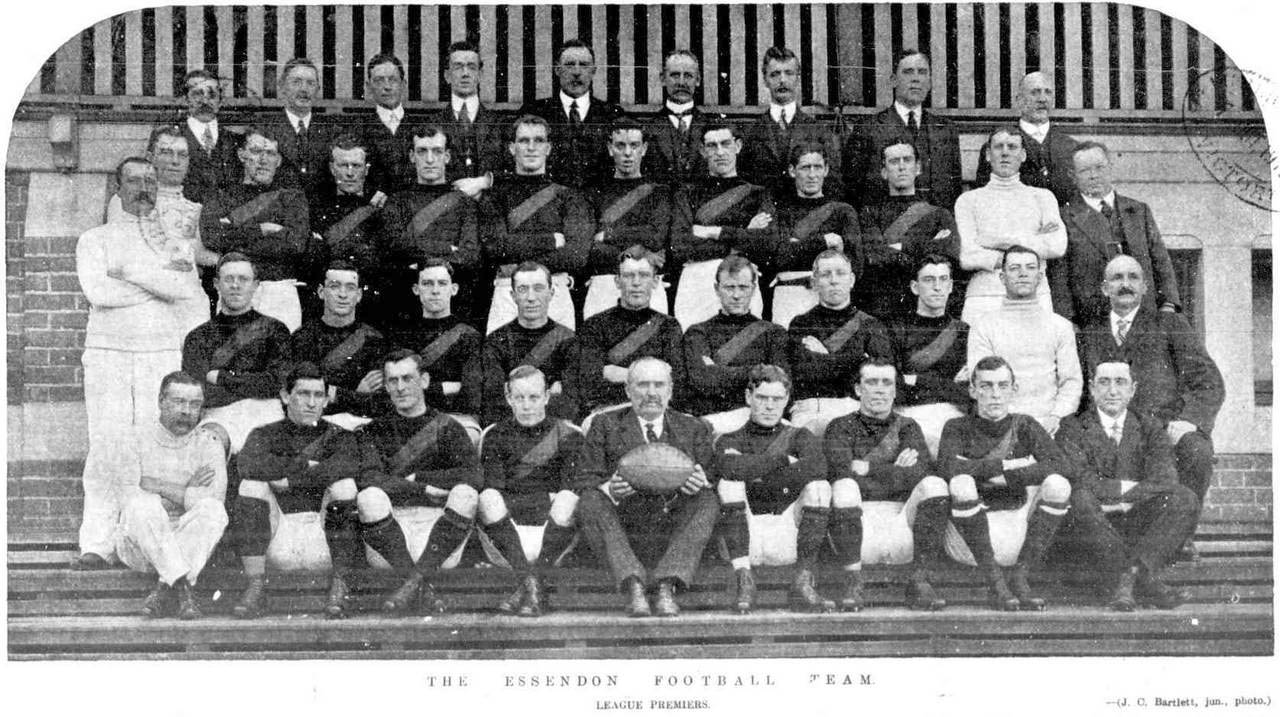
- Essendon 1912 VFL premiership team
- Date: 27 April – 28 September 1912
- Teams: 10
- Premiers: Essendon; 4th premiership
- Minor premiers: South Melbourne; 2nd minor premiership
- Leading goalkicker medallist: Harry Brereton (Melbourne); 56 goals
- Matches played: 94

The 1912 VFL season was the 16th season of the Victorian Football League (VFL), the highest-level senior Australian rules football competition in Victoria. The season featured ten clubs and ran from 27 April to 28 September, comprising an 18-match home-and-away season followed by a four-week finals series featuring the top four clubs.

Essendon won the premiership, defeating South Melbourne by 14 points in the 1912 VFL grand final; it was Essendon's second consecutive premiership and fourth VFL premiership overall. South Melbourne won the minor premiership by finishing atop the home-and-away ladder with a 14–4 win–loss record. Melbourne's Harry Brereton won his second consecutive leading goalkicker medal as the league's leading goalkicker.

== Background ==
In 1912, the VFL competition consisted of ten teams of 18 on-the-field players each, with no "reserves", although any of the 18 players who had left the playing field for any reason could later resume their place on the field at any time during the match.

Each team played each other twice in a home-and-away season of 18 rounds.

Once the 18 round home-and-away season had finished, the 1912 VFL Premiers were determined by the specific format and conventions of the amended "Argus system".

== Home-and-away season ==
=== Round 1 ===
Home team	Home team score	Away team	Away team score	Venue	Date
Essendon	17.14 (116)	University	6.6 (42)	EMCG	27 April 1912
Carlton	9.16 (70)	Geelong	4.7 (31)	Princes Park	27 April 1912
St Kilda	6.10 (46)	Richmond	7.11 (53)	Junction Oval	27 April 1912
South Melbourne	7.5 (47)	Fitzroy	4.10 (34)	Lake Oval	27 April 1912
Melbourne	9.14 (68)	Collingwood	5.9 (39)	MCG	27 April 1912

=== Round 2 ===
Home team	Home team score	Away team	Away team score	Venue	Date
Richmond	5.8 (38)	South Melbourne	2.23 (35)	Punt Road Oval	4 May 1912
Geelong	13.15 (93)	St Kilda	6.11 (47)	Corio Oval	4 May 1912
Collingwood	6.17 (53)	Essendon	10.10 (70)	Victoria Park	4 May 1912
University	8.12 (60)	Melbourne	10.8 (68)	MCG	4 May 1912
Fitzroy	5.11 (41)	Carlton	9.10 (64)	Brunswick Street Oval	4 May 1912

=== Round 3 ===
Home team	Home team score	Away team	Away team score	Venue	Date
Fitzroy	7.14 (56)	Geelong	5.6 (36)	Brunswick Street Oval	11 May 1912
University	9.9 (63)	Richmond	6.12 (48)	MCG	11 May 1912
South Melbourne	6.18 (54)	Melbourne	3.4 (22)	Lake Oval	11 May 1912
St Kilda	12.21 (93)	Collingwood	4.12 (36)	Junction Oval	11 May 1912
Essendon	8.11 (59)	Carlton	6.14 (50)	EMCG	11 May 1912

=== Round 4 ===
Home team	Home team score	Away team	Away team score	Venue	Date
Geelong	11.12 (78)	Melbourne	5.5 (35)	Corio Oval	18 May 1912
Carlton	6.9 (45)	Collingwood	6.10 (46)	Princes Park	18 May 1912
University	3.13 (31)	St Kilda	7.14 (56)	MCG	18 May 1912
Richmond	9.6 (60)	Fitzroy	13.8 (86)	Punt Road Oval	18 May 1912
South Melbourne	8.8 (56)	Essendon	9.8 (62)	Lake Oval	18 May 1912

=== Round 5 ===
Home team	Home team score	Away team	Away team score	Venue	Date
St Kilda	5.5 (35)	South Melbourne	7.8 (50)	Junction Oval	25 May 1912
Fitzroy	8.11 (59)	University	4.8 (32)	Brunswick Street Oval	25 May 1912
Essendon	7.7 (49)	Geelong	7.10 (52)	EMCG	25 May 1912
Collingwood	10.12 (72)	Richmond	6.4 (40)	Victoria Park	25 May 1912
Melbourne	8.2 (50)	Carlton	5.14 (44)	MCG	25 May 1912

=== Round 6 ===
Prior to this round, it was noted by the Football Record that Melbourne had been generally strong while competing at their home ground, but had faltered while away.

Home team	Home team score	Away team	Away team score	Venue	Date
Fitzroy	11.12 (78)	Melbourne	10.6 (66)	Brunswick Street Oval	1 June 1912
Carlton	12.15 (87)	St Kilda	6.11 (47)	Princes Park	1 June 1912
University	5.8 (38)	South Melbourne	9.16 (70)	MCG	1 June 1912
Richmond	10.10 (70)	Essendon	13.14 (92)	Punt Road Oval	1 June 1912
Geelong	13.13 (91)	Collingwood	2.15 (27)	Corio Oval	1 June 1912

=== Round 7 ===
Home team	Home team score	Away team	Away team score	Venue	Date
Collingwood	10.13 (73)	University	4.12 (36)	Victoria Park	3 June 1912
South Melbourne	13.15 (93)	Geelong	8.13 (61)	Lake Oval	3 June 1912
St Kilda	6.10 (46)	Fitzroy	8.7 (55)	Junction Oval	3 June 1912
Melbourne	8.6 (54)	Essendon	16.12 (108)	MCG	3 June 1912
Richmond	7.8 (50)	Carlton	17.17 (119)	Punt Road Oval	3 June 1912

=== Round 8 ===
Home team	Home team score	Away team	Away team score	Venue	Date
Melbourne	14.14 (98)	Richmond	4.9 (33)	MCG	8 June 1912
Geelong	8.15 (63)	University	3.8 (26)	Corio Oval	8 June 1912
Essendon	6.19 (55)	St Kilda	10.6 (66)	EMCG	8 June 1912
Collingwood	13.10 (88)	Fitzroy	11.7 (73)	Victoria Park	8 June 1912
Carlton	8.16 (64)	South Melbourne	6.10 (46)	Princes Park	8 June 1912

=== Round 9 ===
Home team	Home team score	Away team	Away team score	Venue	Date
St Kilda	2.12 (24)	Melbourne	7.13 (55)	Junction Oval	15 June 1912
Richmond	4.16 (40)	Geelong	7.12 (54)	Punt Road Oval	15 June 1912
Fitzroy	3.7 (25)	Essendon	8.8 (56)	Brunswick Street Oval	15 June 1912
South Melbourne	4.16 (40)	Collingwood	4.8 (32)	Lake Oval	15 June 1912
University	8.10 (58)	Carlton	10.17 (77)	MCG	15 June 1912

=== Round 10 ===
Home team	Home team score	Away team	Away team score	Venue	Date
Richmond	6.6 (42)	St Kilda	12.14 (86)	Punt Road Oval	22 June 1912
Fitzroy	3.10 (28)	South Melbourne	9.12 (66)	Brunswick Street Oval	22 June 1912
Collingwood	6.17 (53)	Melbourne	6.9 (45)	Victoria Park	22 June 1912
University	7.10 (52)	Essendon	16.24 (120)	MCG	22 June 1912
Geelong	12.7 (79)	Carlton	8.12 (60)	Corio Oval	22 June 1912

=== Round 11 ===
Home team	Home team score	Away team	Away team score	Venue	Date
Melbourne	13.14 (92)	University	5.7 (37)	MCG	29 June 1912
Carlton	6.8 (44)	Fitzroy	4.15 (39)	Princes Park	29 June 1912
South Melbourne	19.12 (126)	Richmond	5.7 (37)	Lake Oval	29 June 1912
St Kilda	12.11 (83)	Geelong	9.14 (68)	Junction Oval	29 June 1912
Essendon	6.18 (54)	Collingwood	6.10 (46)	EMCG	29 June 1912

=== Round 12 ===
Home team	Home team score	Away team	Away team score	Venue	Date
Richmond	11.19 (85)	University	4.4 (28)	Punt Road Oval	13 July 1912
Melbourne	0.8 (8)	South Melbourne	13.8 (86)	MCG	13 July 1912
Collingwood	8.15 (63)	St Kilda	6.4 (40)	Victoria Park	13 July 1912
Carlton	10.16 (76)	Essendon	4.9 (33)	Princes Park	13 July 1912
Geelong	10.13 (73)	Fitzroy	5.10 (40)	Corio Oval	13 July 1912

=== Round 13 ===
Home team	Home team score	Away team	Away team score	Venue	Date
St Kilda	15.12 (102)	University	6.14 (50)	Junction Oval	20 July 1912
Fitzroy	10.10 (70)	Richmond	3.11 (29)	Brunswick Street Oval	20 July 1912
Essendon	7.10 (52)	South Melbourne	9.11 (65)	EMCG	20 July 1912
Melbourne	7.12 (54)	Geelong	5.13 (43)	MCG	20 July 1912
Collingwood	3.14 (32)	Carlton	8.7 (55)	Victoria Park	20 July 1912

=== Round 14 ===
Home team	Home team score	Away team	Away team score	Venue	Date
Carlton	4.18 (42)	Melbourne	5.7 (37)	Princes Park	27 July 1912
South Melbourne	14.7 (91)	St Kilda	7.18 (60)	Lake Oval	27 July 1912
University	7.8 (50)	Fitzroy	12.14 (86)	MCG	27 July 1912
Geelong	13.14 (92)	Essendon	5.10 (40)	Corio Oval	27 July 1912
Richmond	6.4 (40)	Collingwood	10.15 (75)	Punt Road Oval	27 July 1912

=== Round 15 ===
Home team	Home team score	Away team	Away team score	Venue	Date
South Melbourne	12.13 (85)	University	7.5 (47)	Lake Oval	3 August 1912
Essendon	10.12 (72)	Richmond	5.13 (43)	EMCG	3 August 1912
Collingwood	7.15 (57)	Geelong	6.8 (44)	Victoria Park	3 August 1912
Melbourne	6.6 (42)	Fitzroy	6.7 (43)	MCG	3 August 1912
St Kilda	6.15 (51)	Carlton	7.12 (54)	Junction Oval	3 August 1912

=== Round 16 ===
Home team	Home team score	Away team	Away team score	Venue	Date
Geelong	4.8 (32)	South Melbourne	6.15 (51)	Corio Oval	17 August 1912
Fitzroy	12.17 (89)	St Kilda	8.7 (55)	Brunswick Street Oval	17 August 1912
Essendon	9.8 (62)	Melbourne	7.8 (50)	EMCG	17 August 1912
Carlton	8.20 (68)	Richmond	8.11 (59)	Princes Park	17 August 1912
University	6.7 (43)	Collingwood	6.20 (56)	MCG	17 August 1912

=== Round 17 ===
Home team	Home team score	Away team	Away team score	Venue	Date
Richmond	9.9 (63)	Melbourne	11.7 (73)	Punt Road Oval	24 August 1912
University	7.8 (50)	Geelong	12.22 (94)	MCG	24 August 1912
St Kilda	15.18 (108)	Essendon	7.8 (50)	Junction Oval	24 August 1912
Fitzroy	9.11 (65)	Collingwood	4.3 (27)	Brunswick Street Oval	24 August 1912
South Melbourne	6.10 (46)	Carlton	7.10 (52)	Lake Oval	24 August 1912

=== Round 18 ===
Home team	Home team score	Away team	Away team score	Venue	Date
Melbourne	9.14 (68)	St Kilda	7.7 (49)	MCG	31 August 1912
Geelong	9.16 (70)	Richmond	4.9 (33)	Corio Oval	31 August 1912
Essendon	7.13 (55)	Fitzroy	6.13 (49)	EMCG	31 August 1912
Collingwood	5.7 (37)	South Melbourne	7.11 (53)	Victoria Park	31 August 1912
Carlton	10.14 (74)	University	10.9 (69)	Princes Park	31 August 1912

== Ladder ==
(P)	Premiers
	Qualified for finals

#	Team	P	W	L	D	PF	PA	%	Pts
1	South Melbourne	18	14	4	0	1160	739	157.0	56
2	Carlton	18	14	4	0	1145	873	131.2	56
3	Essendon (P)	18	12	6	0	1205	1049	114.9	48
4	Geelong	18	11	7	0	1154	911	126.7	44
5	Fitzroy	18	10	8	0	1016	936	108.5	40
6	Melbourne	18	9	9	0	985	996	98.9	36
7	Collingwood	18	9	9	0	912	995	91.7	36
8	St Kilda	18	7	11	0	1094	1090	100.4	28
9	Richmond	18	3	15	0	863	1333	64.7	12
10	University	18	1	17	0	812	1424	57.0	4

Rules for classification: 1. premiership points; 2. percentage; 3. points for
Average score: 57.5
Source: AFL Tables

== Finals series ==
All of the 1912 finals were played at the MCG so the home team in the semi-finals and Preliminary Final is purely the higher ranked team from the ladder but in the Grand Final the home team was the team that won the Preliminary Final.

=== Semi-finals ===
Home team	Score	Away team	Score	Venue	Date
Carlton	10.11 (71)	Geelong	4.19 (43)	MCG	7 September
Essendon	7.12 (54)	South Melbourne	6.6 (42)	MCG	14 September

=== Preliminary final ===
Home team	Score	Away team	Score	Venue	Date
Essendon	7.10 (52)	Carlton	6.12 (48)	MCG	21 September

=== Grand final ===
Home team	Score	Away team	Score	Venue	Date
Essendon	5.17 (47)	South Melbourne	4.9 (33)	MCG	28 September

== Season notes ==
- On 27 April 1912, the first issue of the VFL's Football Record was published.
- For the first time, all VFL players wore a number on the back of their guernseys. The number designated the player himself, rather than their position and, in most cases, they played with the same number on their back for the whole season (however, if they changed clubs, their number would also alter).
- University's Round 3 victory over Richmond was ultimately to be the last win in the VFL club's history. University would go on to lose its next 51 matches (including two winless seasons in 1913 and 1914), a VFL/AFL record, before they dropped out of the competition.
- South Australia defeated Victoria 9.8 (62) to 6.7 (43) in Adelaide on 10 August 1912.
- In a match against Collingwood, Essendon's Dan Hanley was impeded from taking part in a contest for the ball along one of the boundary lines, when a boundary umpire allegedly grasped him by the hand. There were no "official" witnesses to this unusual incident, and the boundary umpire went unpunished.
- The captains of the two 1912 second semi-final teams, Allan Belcher of Essendon and Vic Belcher of South Melbourne, were brothers.
- The VFL decided to appoint two stewards to each match and they had the power to report players. They wore an all-white uniform, with the word "Steward" in red on their breast.

== Awards ==
- The 1912 VFL Premiership team was Essendon.
- The VFL's leading goalkicker was Harry Brereton of Melbourne with 56 goals.
- University took the "wooden spoon" in 1912.

== Sources ==
- 1912 VFL season at AFL Tables
- 1912 VFL season at Australian Football
