= Jack Elder (umpire) =

Personal information
- Full name: John Elder
- Born: 1885; Carlton, Victoria
- Died: 24 December 1944; Royal Melbourne Hospital

Umpiring career
Years	League	Role	Games
1906–1922	VFL	Field umpire	296
1906–1909	VFL	Boundary umpire	7

Career highlights
- VFL Grand Final umpire 10 times

John "Jack" Elder (1885 – 24 December 1944) was an Australian rules football umpire who in 1996 was named as the VFL/AFL's "Umpire of the Century".

He officiated as field umpire in 296 VFL matches (plus seven as a boundary umpire) between 1906 and 1922, including 39 finals and 10 grand finals, both of which stand as the all-time record for VFL umpires active in 1897-1975 (when matches were controlled by a single umpire).

Elder's record of 296 matches umpired stood until broken by Jack McMurray Senior in 1936, while his VFL/AFL record of 39 finals was equalled in 2010 by Hayden Kennedy and broken by Shaun Ryan in 2020, and his record of ten grand finals stood as the record for 101 years until it was broken by Matt Stevic (who umpired during the eras of three and four field umpires) in 2023. He also held the position of Umpire's Advisor in 1923.

In a famous incident in the 1910 VFL Grand Final, a massive brawl broke out between Collingwood and Carlton players during the last quarter. A number of players were felled and four players were reported (the first in Grand Final history), yet the fight kept going. Elder settled matters by blowing his whistle and bouncing the ball. Most of the combatants looked on, stunned, as the game recommenced without them, so they had no option but to forget about the fight.

His umpiring philosophy was quoted in The Sporting Globe more than a decade after his retirement.

"Even in the hardest fought match it is important to remain calm. Use the whistle only when required. League football is not a genteel sport for schoolgirls and the term 'rough' is often misapplied. That borderline between manly vigour and roughhouse tactics is sometimes a little vague. The term 'rough football' should I think be used sparingly. 'Hard play' differs greatly from the sly bump, the kicks at ankles, the trips and the knees jolted in the backs that constitute rough and illegal play."

Elder considered the pre-World War I era of 1905–14 as the golden age of football, yet it was a period where allegations of bribery led to several League investigations, and on-field violence was at its height, forcing the League to the number and powers of umpires. In this environment, Elder stood out, with the first VFL umpires coach (Jack Worrall) referring to him as "our leading adjudicator".

In 1996, the Australian Football League announced its inaugural inductees to the Australian Football Hall of Fame, including 10 umpires. Above the other noteworthy inductees, they chose Elder as Umpire of the Century.
