= List of Essendon Football Club players =

This is a list of Essendon Football Club players who have made one or more appearance in the Australian Football League (AFL), known as the Victorian Football League (VFL) until 1990 and the AFL Women's. Essendon were one of the foundation clubs for the inaugural VFL season in 1897. They joined the AFLW in 2022 (S7).

== Essendon Football Club players ==
Key
Order	Players are listed in order of debut
Seasons	Includes Essendon only careers and spans from when a player was first listed with the club to their final year on the list
Debut	Debuts are for VFL/AFL regular season and finals series matches only
Games	Statistics are for VFL/AFL regular season and finals series matches only and are correct to the end of the 2025 season.
Goals	Statistics are for VFL/AFL regular season and finals series matches only and are correct to the end of the 2025 season.
^{^}	Currently listed players

=== 1890s ===
Debut Year	Player	Games	Goals	Playing Career
1897	Jim Anderson	136	13	1897–1905
1897	Son Barry	131	24	1897–1905
1897	Arthur Cleghorn	61	53	1903
1897	Maurie Collins	98	7	1897–1904
1897	Tod Collins	91	23	1897–1903
1897	Jim Darcy	9	1	1897
1897	Charlie Forbes	52	13	1897–1902
1897	Johnny Graham	1	2	1897
1897	Joe Groves	57	0	1897–1900
1897	George Hastings	107	25	1897–1904
1897	Ted Kinnear	108	31	1897–1903
1897	George Martin	105	34	1897–1904
1897	Bob McCormick	1	0	1897
1897	Gus Officer	48	12	1897–1900
1897	Ned Officer	18	0	1897–1898
1897	Pat O'Loughlin	74	18	1897–1902
1897	Bert Salkeld	5	3	1897
1897	George Stuckey	71	4	1897–1902
1897	Norman Waugh	23	30	1897–1898
1897	Harry Wright	87	6	1897–1903
1897	Edgar Croft	15	12	1897–1899
1897	Hugh Gavin	112	21	1904
1897	George Vautin	26	1	1897–1898
1897	Fred Ball	5	1	1897
1897	Harold Brown	8	1	1897–1898
1897	Archie Sykes	11	1	1897
1897	Gus Kearney	18	8	1897–1898
1897	Jim Park	6	0	1897
1897	Jimmy Thurgood	3	2	1897
1897	Jim White	1	1	1897
1897	Arthur Leach	4	2	1897
1897	Charlie Moore	30	34	1897–1899
1897	Alby Stamp	5	2	1897,1899
1897	Colin Campbell	12	4	1897–1899
1897	George Cochrane	22	4	1901–1904
1897	Dave Ferguson	2	0	1897–1898
1898	Pat Barr	3	1	1898
1898	Corrie Gardner	12	0	1898
1898	Alex Hall	19	18	1898–1900
1898	Jimmy Larkin	73	61	1898–1903
1898	Conrad ten Brink	12	10	1898
1898	Pos Watson	2	0	1898
1898	Dave Currie	1	1	1898
1898	Horrie Stewart	1	0	1898
1898	Bill Jackson	27	22	1898–1900
1898	Alf Gray	5	0	1902
1899	Jim Cullen	1	0	1899
1899	Billy Griffith	187	13	1899–1913
1899	Mick O'Loughlin	5	0	1899
1899	Fred Scott	33	25	1899–1901
1899	Charlie McCartney	4	0	1899
1899	Hugh Fitzpatrick	30	26	1899–1900
1899	Albert Thurgood	46	89	1906
1899	Leslie Rainey	5	3	1899–1900

=== 1900s ===
Debut year	Player	Games	Goals	Years at club
1900	Llew Jones	5	2	1900
1900	Tommy Leahy	2	0	1900
1900	Mick Peppard	42	10	1900–1903
1900	Billy Grace	4	1	1900
1900	Herb Hunter	3	0	1900
1900	Alf Dear	6	1	1900
1900	Bill Crebbin	1	0	1900
1900	Hughie Johns	1	2	1900
1900	Fred Hiskins	50	78	1900–1902, 1906
1901	Bobby Byers	1	0	1901
1901	Ted Kennedy	43	1	1901–1903
1901	Bill Robinson	71	14	1901–1902, 1904–1906
1901	Herc Vollugi	70	5	1901–1906
1901	George Ward	1	0	1901
1901	Artie White	6	3	1901
1901	Marcus Evans	1	0	1901
1901	Mick Morris	1	0	1901
1901	Jim Beasley	2	0	1901
1901	Jack McKenzie	81	90	1901–1902, 1904–1906
1901	Fred Mann	27	1	1901–1903
1901	James Kennedy	3	9	1901
1902	Ben Baxter	67	4	1902–1906
1902	Jack Geggie	43	11	1902–1904
1902	Syd Hall	8	1	1902
1902	Jack Deas	3	0	1902
1902	Bill Webb	1	1	1902
1902	Vic Hutchens	11	8	1902
1902	Harry Ford	2	0	1902
1902	John Holligan	5	4	1902–1903
1903	Hughie Callan	35	15	1903–1905
1903	Barlow Carkeek	26	8	1903–1905
1903	Mick Madden	65	51	1903–1906
1903	Bill McCarthy	3	0	1903
1903	Johnny Meadows	4	2	1903
1903	David Smith	142	114	1913
1903	Tom Williams	2	0	1903
1903	Ted Flynn	1	0	1903
1903	Arthur Gilligan	29	11	1903–1905
1903	Joe Marr	14	1	1903
1903	Tom Hedley	24	6	1903–1904
1903	George Barker	47	74	1903–1905, 1907, 1909
1903	Jack Trehey	6	1	1903
1903	Jack Rosser	8	1	1903
1903	Jack Sullivan	2	1	1903, 1907
1903	Jack McIntyre	4	1	1903
1903	Fred Fooks	3	2	1903
1903	Jim McDonald	28	2	1903–1906
1903	Percy Abercrombie	2	0	1903
1903	Jack Godby	2	0	1903
1903	Joe Shippen	1	0	1903
1904	Norman Belcher	2	0	1904
1904	Bill Busbridge	103	32	1904–1912
1904	Alex Robinson	9	5	1904
1904	Harry Laxton	44	3	1904–1907
1904	Fred Robinson	35	0	1904–1905
1904	Arthur Legge	69	30	1904–1909
1904	Alf Swift	7	2	1904
1904	Mick Pleass	4	0	1904
1904	Jim Phipps	22	0	1904–1906
1905	Harry Davis	11	3	1905
1905	Dick Harris	3	5	1905
1905	Bill Kerr	1	0	1905
1905	Jack Megson	1	0	1905
1905	Jimmy O'Brien	8	0	1905
1905	Simon Fraser	21	8	1905–1906
1905	Bill Sewart	171	7	1905–1915
1905	Alby Matheson	1	0	1905
1905	Bill McVitty	9	0	1905,1907
1905	Mark Shea	71	0	1905–1909
1905	Ernie Cameron	114	55	1905–1912
1905	Athol Tymms	3	1	1905
1905	John Everard	1	0	1905
1905	Lewis Blackmore	7	10	1905–1907
1905	Arch McDonald	1	0	1905
1905	Edwin McDonald	1	1	1905
1906	Allan Belcher	176	40	1906–1915, 1918–1919
1906	Jack Borthwick	2	0	1906
1906	Bill Davies	65	4	1906–1909
1906	John Green	3	0	1906
1906	Charlie Morley	3	0	1906
1906	Charlie Teather	20	3	1906–1907, 1910
1906	James Wilson	1	0	1906
1906	Norman Yeo	15	31	1906
1906	Bert Numa	1	0	1906
1906	Alf George	33	0	1906–1909
1906	Gordon Ross-Soden	1	0	1906
1906	John Dixon	1	0	1906
1906	George Gibson	12	1	1906–1907
1906	Con Kennedy	4	0	1906
1906	Ray Sartori	7	1	1906–1907
1906	Phil Gibson	6	0	1906
1906	Gerald Ryan	18	3	1906, 1909
1906	Chris Fogarty	2	0	1906
1906	Joe Fogarty	2	3	1906
1906	Cec Garton	1	0	1906
1907	John Anderson	3	0	1907
1907	Norm Busbridge	5	0	1907
1907	Alf Jackson	13	0	1907,1909
1907	Bill Johnson	30	4	1907–1908
1907	Otto Landmann	27	34	1907–1910
1907	Jim Martin	95	71	1907–1913
1907	Alby Sykes	4	1	1907
1907	Len Bowe	185	4	1907–1915, 1918–1920
1907	Fred Parkinson	53	27	1907–1910
1907	Bruce Sloss	3	0	1907–1908
1907	Horrie Dick	1	0	1907
1907	John Stephenson	10	0	1907
1907	Dick Clough	2	0	1907–1908
1907	Gordon Kearney	5	0	1907
1907	Mike Londerigan	42	21	1907–1909
1907	Peter McCann	1	0	1907
1907	Charles Bolton	1	0	1907
1907	Charlie Haigbloom	9	10	1907
1907	Barney Jenkins	3	2	1907
1907	Cliff Bennett	3	0	1907
1907	Bill Lonergan	1	0	1907
1908	Lou Armstrong	104	109	1908–1914
1908	Tommy Crow	4	0	1908
1908	Les Minto	25	7	1908–1909
1908	Bert Ryan	15	3	1908
1908	Paddy Shea	142	156	1908–1915, 1918
1908	Tom Sevior	1	0	1908
1908	Lon Smith	6	1	1908
1908	Harry Farnsworth	24	16	1908–1909
1908	Archie Snell	1	0	1908
1908	Alan Irwin	8	2	1908–1909
1908	Jim Campbell	1	0	1908
1908	Fred Anderson	1	0	1908
1908	Bill French	3	0	1908–1909
1908	Bert Daykin	32	9	1908–1910
1908	Bill Heaphy	5	3	1908–1909
1908	Harry Prout	29	35	1908–1910
1909	Artie Bowe	2	0	1909
1909	Hurtle Rice	1	0	1909
1909	Billy Harrison	24	6	1909–1911
1909	Alby Kennedy	2	2	1909
1909	Wally Roach	4	0	1909
1909	Rupert Cooper	1	0	1909
1909	Fred Whelpton	10	5	1909–1910
1909	Charlie Beckley	13	9	1909–1910

=== 1910s ===
Debut year	Player	Games	Goals	Years at club
1910	Ramsay Anderson	28	0	1910–1911
1910	Bert Armstrong	45	55	1910–1912,1914
1910	Horrie Bant	12	0	1910
1910	Percy Ogden	161	91	1910–1915,1918–1921
1910	Fred O'Shea	49	3	1910–1912
1910	Dick Bayford	5	2	1910
1910	Val Crawley	1	0	1910
1910	George McLeod	56	5	1910–1913
1910	Dick Monteith	20	0	1910–1912
1910	Hedley Bryant	3	2	1910
1910	Les White	75	1	1910–1915
1910	Fred Baring	154	92	1910–1915,1918–1924
1910	Jack Wood	2	0	1910
1910	Leo O'Connor	10	6	1910–1911
1910	Arthur Slater	1	0	1910
1911	Bill Walker	66	53	1911–1915
1911	Wally Chalmers	73	11	1911–1915,1918
1911	Rupe Benstead	4	0	1911
1911	Vernon Hazel	12	4	1911–1912
1911	Charlie Hay	2	0	1911
1911	Dan Hanley	67	9	1911–1914
1911	Johnny Hart	4	0	1911
1911	Jack Kirby	77	113	1911–1915,1918
1911	Edgar Masters	1	0	1911
1911	Artie Freeman	1	0	1911
1911	Jimmy Jones	1	0	1911
1912	Fred Kirkwood	42	8	1912–1914
1912	Ted McDonald	2	0	1912
1912	Bruce Godfrey	1	0	1912
1912	Frank Caine	22	33	1912–1914
1912	Len Worle	4	0	1912
1912	Billy Harvey	9	2	1912
1912	Jack O'Brien	15	1	1912–1913
1912	Bill Kyme	3	2	1912
1912	Edric Bickford	1	0	1912
1912	Jack Blencowe	1	0	1912
1913	Clyde Donaldson	144	28	1913–1914,1919–1926
1913	Rupe Lowell	10	0	1913
1913	Fred Edwards	1	1	1913
1913	Jim Moore	1	0	1913
1913	Hughie Tait	8	5	1913
1913	Ernie Lumsden	34	49	1913–1915
1913	Johnny Allan	10	2	1913
1913	Hugh Heron	2	0	1913
1913	Art Wilkinson	2	0	1913
1913	George Parkinson	9	0	1913–1914
1913	Herbert Wilson	1	0	1913
1913	Jack Woolley	9	5	1913–1914
1913	Bob Walker	51	17	1913–1915,1919–1920
1913	Vic McNeil	12	1	1913–1914
1913	John Pike	4	0	1913
1913	Wilfred Stott	2	1	1913
1913	Jimmy Gordon	8	11	1913–1914
1913	Cyril Gove	28	3	1913–1915,1918
1913	Roy Laing	131	3	1913–1915,1918–1925
1913	Norm Hall	13	17	1913–1914,1918
1914	Bill Dinsmore	13	17	1914–1915
1914	Jim Freeman	2	0	1914
1914	Neil King	3	0	1914–1915
1914	Harry Neate	3	0	1914–1915
1914	Bob Rahilly	2	4	1914
1914	Horrie Webster	23	13	1914–1915
1914	Henry Elkington	1	0	1914
1914	Basil Nehill	2	0	1914
1914	Tommy Wade	23	4	1914–1915,1919
1914	Arthur Mann	3	0	1914,1919
1914	Bert Day	68	0	1914–1915,1918–1921
1914	Frank Hurren	2	1	1914–1915
1915	Fred McIntosh	14	1	1915
1915	Bill Wylie	9	1	1915,1918
1915	Tom Pollard	8	5	1915
1915	Col Sinclair	11	4	1915,1918
1915	Alby O'Connor	13	1	1915,1918
1915	Bob Shearer	3	1	1915
1915	Charles Comber	1	0	1915
1915	Les Rogers	3	0	1915
1915	Harold Feehan	11	0	1915
1915	Percy Martyn	45	7	1915,1918–1921
1915	Bobby Donald	22	3	1915,1918–1920
1915	Flurence Moore	7	2	1915
1915	Ned Richardson	22	2	1915,1918
1915	Jim Condon	17	15	1915,1918
1915	Jack Garden	116	42	1920–1926
1915	Bill Scott	4	0	1915
1915	Vic Nankervis	6	0	1915,1918
1915	Harold Day	1	1	1915
1918	Bill Coffey	1	0	1918
1918	Norm Dunn	14	3	1918–1919
1918	Phil Furlong	5	3	1918
1918	Leo McInerney	12	2	1918–1919
1918	Jimmy Sullivan	90	20	1918–1925
1918	Dave Walsh	25	18	1918–1920
1918	Tom Fitzmaurice	85	30	1922–1924
1918	Harry Sawyer	4	0	1918
1918	Jim Taylor	1	0	1918
1918	Jack McGarity	2	0	1918
1918	Len Phillips	4	0	1918
1918	Bert Drinkwater	27	15	1918–1920
1918	Sydney Barr	1	0	1918
1918	Tom Greenwood	2	0	1918
1918	Paddy McDonald	9	3	1918–1919
1918	Bill Hanson	3	1	1918
1918	Eric Sprague	3	0	1918
1918	James Lavelle	1	1	1918
1918	Bertie Wollacott	11	7	1918–1921
1918	Jim Alexander	5	1	1918–1919
1918	George Hemingway	1	0	1918
1919	Harry Dussell	32	16	1919–1921
1919	Charlie Farrell	69	20	1919–1925
1919	Syd Sutherland	13	3	1919
1919	Stan Anderson	1	0	1919
1919	Jack Harrison	1	0	1919
1919	Col Laidlaw	41	16	1919–1923
1919	Pat Robertson	18	1	1919–1920
1919	Jim Collins	30	4	1919–1921
1919	Ivan More	2	0	1919
1919	Frank McDonald	28	56	1919–1921
1919	Jim McLear	1	0	1919
1919	Archie Giles	4	0	1919–1920

=== 1920s ===
Debut year	Player	Games	Goals	Years at club
1920	Ralph Cornall	7	0	1920
1920	Jack O'Brien	14	15	1920
1920	Wally Fraser	19	10	1920–1922
1920	Charles Hector McFadyen	4	2	1920
1920	Andy Donnelly	12	0	1920–1921
1920	George Faulkner	15	13	1920–1921
1920	Norm McLean	6	0	1920
1920	Ralph Gardiner	8	3	1920–1921
1920	Greg Stockdale	106	189	1920–1928
1920	Percy Watson	1	0	1920
1921	Norm Beckton	173	157	1921–1930
1921	Harry Hunter	109	9	1921–1927,1929
1921	Dick Maynard	7	0	1921
1921	Charlie Zinnick	13	0	1921
1921	Bill Fawcett	2	0	1921
1921	Charlie Fehring	4	8	1921
1921	Tommy Jenkins	63	150	1921–1925
1921	Tommy Bell	9	0	1921
1921	Tom Wardley	14	0	1921
1921	Les Woodfield	15	15	1921–1922
1921	Frank Maher	137	124	1921–1928
1921	Clarrie Woodfield	1	0	1921
1921	Ray Ross	8	7	1921
1921	George Harris	1	0	1921
1921	Syd Barker, Sr.	57	23	1921–1924
1921	Charlie Hardy	36	21	1921–1925
1921	Teddy Gardiner	8	0	1921–1922
1921	Vince Irwin	78	102	1921–1926
1922	Ken Adam	31	0	1922–1925
1922	Roy Kemp	12	4	1922
1922	Charlie May	84	3	1922–1926
1922	Jack Moriarty	13	36	1922
1922	Gilbert Wardley	1	0	1922
1922	Rowley Watt	141	41	1922–1931
1922	Justin McCarthy	56	60	1922–1926
1922	Clarrie Clowe	5	1	1922
1922	Joe Callahan	27	11	1922–1924
1922	Ralph Raisbeck	3	0	1922–1923
1922	Enos Thomas	1	0	1922
1923	Garnet Campbell	157	51	1923–1933
1923	Harry Harrison	3	0	1923
1923	Val Marchesi	8	0	1923–1924
1923	George Shorten	52	26	1923–1926
1923	Joe Harrison	64	5	1923–1927
1923	Bill Hayes	4	0	1923–1924
1923	George Rawle	19	4	1923–1925
1924	Harry Gregory	89	0	1924–1930
1924	Les Kittle	1	0	1924
1924	Bill Cookson	2	3	1924
1925	Bert McComb	3	1	1925
1925	Jack Vosti	101	80	1935
1925	Ned McSweeney	37	7	1925–1928
1925	Norm Simpson	77	29	1925–1932
1925	Bill Manger	6	7	1925
1925	Joe Hammond	122	18	1925–1932
1925	Rod Watt	21	1	1925–1927
1925	Dave Dick	3	7	1925
1925	Jim Quinn	66	59	1925–1931
1926	Syd Carman	96	8	1926–1933
1926	Jack Dolan	24	0	1926–1929
1926	Bill Hudd	29	5	1926–1927
1926	Jack Kidd	42	12	1926–1930
1926	Chris Gomez	9	0	1926–1928
1926	George Page	1	0	1926
1926	Wally Edward	4	0	1926
1926	Stuart Russell	6	1	1931
1926	Frank Nash	80	28	1926–1935
1926	Dick Gosling	5	11	1926–1927
1926	Teddy Shorten	5	4	1926
1927	Bruce Carruthers	12	6	1927–1928
1927	Rupe Dodd	11	19	1927
1927	Bill Vickers	3	4	1927
1927	Ben Kavanagh	2	2	1927
1927	Tom Clarke	103	3	1927–1934
1927	Paddy Walsh	115	20	1927–1936
1927	Jack Boyd	2	2	1927
1927	Bill Speakman	16	8	1927–1929
1927	Les Irving	8	0	1927
1927	Mal James	1	0	1927
1927	Len Webster	145	100	1927–1938
1927	Artie Rennie	23	0	1927–1929
1928	Lloyd Bertram	8	10	1930
1928	Ernie Martin	17	0	1928–1929
1928	Howard Okey	109	52	1928–1934
1928	Bill Henry	9	20	1928
1928	Alan Arthur	30	54	1928,1930
1928	Aub Charleston	9	0	1928
1928	Keith Forbes	152	415	1928–1937
1928	Athol Cerini	2	2	1928
1928	Keith Parris	16	0	1928–1929
1928	Jack Way	5	2	1928
1929	Len Johnson	64	85	1929–1933
1929	Jack Williamson	60	6	1931–1933
1929	Jack Cross	1	0	1929
1929	Ernie Watson	23	0	1929–1930
1929	Clarrie Hearn	92	90	1929–1935
1929	Jack McKenzie	5	1	1929
1929	Roy Payne	19	15	1931
1929	Charlie Milburn	9	0	1929
1929	Vern Sarsfield	2	1	1929
1929	Ted Freyer	124	372	1929–1937
1929	Frank Gomez, Jr.	22	8	1929–1932

=== 1930s ===
Debut year	Player	Games	Goals	Years at club
1930	Tommy Gubbins	17	1	1930–1931
1930	Charlie Sevior	5	2	1930
1930	Billy Lynch	18	1	1930–1931
1930	Mal MacRae	19	14	1930–1931
1930	Jock Turner	1	2	1930
1930	Leo Glynn	9	0	1930
1930	Gerry Donnelly	3	0	1930
1930	Lindsay Smail	1	1	1930
1930	Bill Lowenthal	73	14	1930–1935,1937
1931	Norm Le Brun	23	4	1931–1932
1931	Les Rennie	13	0	1931
1931	Bruce Anderson	97	1	1931–1937
1931	Fred Coulsell	2	2	1931
1931	John Ryan	5	4	1931–1932
1931	Gerry Hartigan	1	1	1931
1931	Cliff Coulson	1	1	1931
1931	Reg Peterson	20	8	1931–1932
1931	Eddie Regan	1	0	1931
1931	Bill Roberts	12	1	1931,1933
1932	Frank Ford	21	26	1932–1933
1932	Russell Madden	12	0	1932,1934
1932	Carl Watson	11	1	1932
1932	Les Whitfield	1	1	1932
1932	William Wilson	30	7	1932–1933,1935
1932	Dick O'Shea	7	0	1932
1932	Matt Carland	6	0	1932
1932	Ted Fay	28	1	1932–1934
1932	Jock O'Brien	22	12	1932–1934
1932	Johnny Walker	27	7	1932–1934
1932	Joe Lovett	5	0	1932
1932	Gavin Morgan	6	0	1932–1933
1932	Wally Colliss	1	0	1932
1933	Dick Reynolds	320	442	1933–1951
1933	Reg Twite	2	0	1933
1933	Jimmy Bates	1	0	1933
1933	Clive McCorkell	7	1	1933
1933	Hugh Torney	173	81	1933–1943
1933	Stan Lawler	3	9	1933
1933	Les Griggs	99	52	1944
1933	Frank Hunting	4	0	1933
1933	Alby Jacobsen	7	0	1933
1933	George Bell	120	4	1933–1942
1933	Bill Ewing	5	3	1933
1933	Harold Dickinson	2	2	1933
1933	Walt Wollermann	9	2	1933
1933	Ted Rippon	69	12	1933–1939
1933	Wally Milne	22	11	1933–1935
1933	Norm McCleary	2	3	1933
1934	Col Crawford	20	6	1934–1935
1934	Jack Hiskins	16	7	1934–1935
1934	Bill Luff	82	37	1934,1936–1940
1934	Len Wallace	61	7	1934–1938
1934	Eric Dalton	5	6	1934
1934	Bill Earle	40	7	1934–1936
1934	Lew Sharpe	1	0	1934
1934	David Wilkie	1	3	1934
1934	Joe Oakley	2	2	1934
1934	Colin Braid	1	0	1934
1934	Kevin Hardiman	18	28	1934–1935,1939
1934	Bill Turner	28	3	1934–1936
1934	Harry Gyles	9	6	1934
1934	Tom Bawden	5	3	1934
1934	Harry Plummer	2	0	1934
1934	George Pattinson	67	17	1942
1934	Merv Storey	2	2	1934
1934	Elton Plummer	141	1	1934,1936–1944
1934	Steve Bloomer	1	0	1934
1935	Ted Bryce	106	125	1935–1942
1935	Tommy Lahiff	49	67	1935–1937
1935	Syd Slater	33	14	1935–1939
1935	Jack Stenhouse	4	0	1935
1935	Murray Exelby	113	102	1935–1944
1935	Frank Asling	7	0	1935
1935	George Prismall	1	0	1935
1935	Bob Mathews	2	0	1935
1935	Billy Hall	22	9	1942
1935	George Coward	7	0	1935–1937
1935	Allan McHardy	1	0	1935
1935	George McGorlick	3	2	1935–1937
1936	Jack Baggott	19	0	1936–1937
1936	Harry Carey	3	0	1936
1936	Almond Richards	4	0	1936
1936	Ron Shapter	2	0	1936
1936	Tommy Smith	10	8	1936
1936	Jack Cassin	150	145	1946–1947
1936	Stan Wilson	75	7	1936–1941
1936	Dick Welch	20	4	1936–1938
1936	Arnold Maltby	34	15	1936–1938
1936	Jack Crane	2	7	1936
1936	Mick McFarlane	11	15	1936–1937
1936	Perc Bushby	142	46	1936,1939–1948
1936	Bill Kinnear	3	1	1936
1936	Eric Coutts	1	0	1936
1936	Harry Mallett	2	0	1936
1937	Frank Kelly	30	7	1937–1939
1937	Archie Roberts	12	0	1937
1937	Norm McDermott	21	13	1937–1939
1937	Les Powell	20	0	1937–1938
1937	Wally Coates	5	2	1937
1937	Don Howard	1	0	1937
1937	Tom Reynolds	109	361	1937–1944
1937	Jack Hubbert	2	1	1937
1937	Norm Baker	55	0	1937–1941
1937	Leo Maynes	36	7	1937–1940
1937	Bill Cahill	15	0	1937–1938
1937	Ray Watts	59	149	1937–1941
1937	Dick Eason	2	0	1937
1937	Doug Munro	1	0	1937
1938	Noel Smith	38	50	1943–1945
1938	Paul Buckley	2	0	1938
1938	Jack Caesar	75	15	1938–1942
1938	Les Begley	50	32	1938–1941
1938	Harry Lippiatt	22	1	1938–1939
1938	Bob Standfield	26	1	1938–1940
1938	Jack Allister	1	1	1938
1938	Syd McGain	1	1	1938
1938	Peter Paterson	9	5	1945
1939	Wally Buttsworth	188	2	1939–1949
1939	Fred Green	49	7	1943,|1946
1939	Ernie Coward	118	20	1939–1945
1939	Ron Smith	11	0	1939–1941
1939	Ashley Foley	7	1	1939
1939	Godfrey Goldin	8	6	1939
1939	Bill Green	6	6	1939–1940
1939	Chris Lambert	137	18	1944–1951
1939	Norman Doig	2	0	1939
1939	Ted Regan	7	1	1941
1939	Bill Eastmure	1	0	1939

=== 1940s ===
Debut year	Player	Games	Goals	Years at club
1940	Cec Ruddell	122	0	1940–1943, 1945–1949
1940	Max Smith	7	0	1940
1940	Charlie Challenger	2	0	1940
1940	Joe Evans	21	1	1940–1942
1940	Norm Betson	78	41	1940–1945
1940	Jack Hunter	2	7	1940
1940	Harold Lambert	99	2	1940–1941, 1946–1951
1940	Gordon Lane	131	256	1940–1949
1940	Allan Hird, Sr.	102	2	1940–1945
1940	Ivor McIvor	12	9	1940, 1944, 1946
1941	Bob Flanigan	42	1	1941–1942, 1944–1945
1941	Keith Forsyth	2	0	1941
1941	Gordon Abbott	83	43	1941–1947
1941	Dick Molloy	2	0	1941
1941	Andy McPartland	1	0	1941
1941	Ritchie Thomas	4	0	1941
1941	Jack Keddie	1	0	1941
1941	Sid Silk	15	0	1941–1944
1942	Laurie Dearle	76	42	1942–1947
1942	Bill Hutchison	290	496	1942–1957
1942	Keith Rawle	111	98	1942–1943, 1946–1949
1942	Ted Leehane	83	140	1942–1943, 1946–1950
1942	Ray Powell	49	69	1942–1947
1942	Murray Dimble	20	17	1942, 1944–1945
1942	Maurie Edwards	5	0	1942–1943
1943	Les Gardiner	166	0	1943, 1945–1953
1943	Bert Harper	76	32	1943–1944, 1946–1952
1943	Bill Brittingham	172	181	1943–1952
1943	Jimmy Farrell	4	9	1943
1943	Bob Drummond	14	31	1943–1945
1943	Bill Gregg	1	0	1943
1943	Jack Cockburn	10	2	1943–1944
1943	Gil Langley	4	1	1943
1944	Herbie Tonkes	37	0	1944, 1946–1947
1944	Ray Finn	10	14	1944–1945
1944	Jack Symons	3	0	1944
1944	Bob Syme	116	59	1944–1945, 1947–1953
1944	Jack Vinall	2	1	1944
1944	Ron Kennedy	3	1	1944
1944	Alan Randall	9	0	1944–1945
1944	Ken Collicoat	2	0	1944
1944	Terry Healy	15	1	1944–1945
1944	Jack Henry	4	1	1944–1945
1944	Alan Shaw	5	0	1944–1945
1944	Russell Hill	14	1	1944, 1946–1947
1945	Bob Annesley	6	7	1945
1945	Ron Jory	25	17	1945–1946
1945	Bill Pearson	51	24	1945–1947
1945	Ray Thomas	4	0	1945
1945	Jack Lyons	32	3	1945–1946
1945	Fred Buttsworth	8	9	1945
1945	Jackie Huggard	1	0	1945
1945	Milton Clark	3	0	1945
1945	Harry Ralph	4	0	1945
1945	Harry Equid	40	67	1945–1948
1946	George Hassell	63	4	1946–1950
1946	Jack Jones	175	156	1946–1954
1946	Allan Matheson	3	2	1946
1946	Ivan Goodingham	36	37	1946–1949
1946	Ray Bower	10	1	1946–1947
1946	Bob McClure	90	17	1946–1951
1947	Wally May	94	8	1947–1952
1947	Jack Johnson	5	8	1947
1947	Norm McDonald	128	3	1947–1953
1947	Noel Allanson	57	1	1947–1951
1947	Les Field	2	0	1947
1947	Ken Newton	24	19	1947–1950
1947	Bob Bradley	62	5	1947–1950
1947	Doug Bigelow	148	27	1947–1956
1947	Greg Tate	70	95	1947–1951
1948	Ron McEwin	77	76	1948–1952
1948	Dick Bryar	3	0	1948
1948	Vic Fisher	25	4	1948–1949
1948	George Goninon	9	11	1948–1950
1948	John Ward	1	0	1948
1949	John Coleman	98	537	1949–1954
1949	John McLeish	10	0	1949–1950
1949	Roy McConnell	135	0	1949–1956
1949	Jack Simpson	6	0	1949, 1951
1949	Fred Payne	42	7	1949–1953
1949	Alan Thaw	41	0	1952–1954

=== 1950s ===
Debut year	Player	Games	Goals	Years at club
1950	Bill Snell	36	16	1950–1952
1950	Jack Collins	13	1	1950
1950	Tom Leehane	7	0	1950–1951
1950	Jack O'Halloran	10	3	1950–1951
1950	Ray Martini	13	1	1950–1952
1950	Brian Gilmore	11	2	1950–1953
1950	Alan Dale	45	3	1950–1953, 1956
1950	Mal McGillivray	1	0	1950
1951	John Gill	107	76	1951–1957
1951	Alby Law	7	1	1951–1953
1951	Keith McDonald	13	9	1951–1952
1951	Keith McIntosh	1	0	1951
1951	Lloyd Middleton	2	0	1951
1951	Ron Lunn	28	3	1951–1952
1951	Lance Mann	80	22	1951–1954, 1958–1959
1951	Geoff Leek	191	98	1951–1962
1951	Jim Carstairs	71	25	1951–1957
1951	Jack Clarke	263	180	1951–1967
1952	Jim Heenan	82	6	1952–1957
1952	Jack Knowles	78	0	1952–1958
1952	Hugh Morris	21	2	1952–1954
1952	Brian Coleman	10	0	1952–1953
1952	Peter O'Sullivan	47	1	1952–1955
1952	John Ramsay	2	0	1952
1952	Fred Gallagher	84	61	1952–1958
1952	Ron Dunn	2	0	1952
1952	Brian Paine	1	0	1952
1952	Greg Sewell	171	34	1952–1961
1952	Stan Booth	102	118	1952–1959
1953	Jack Harrington	64	12	1953–1957
1953	John Towner	87	36	1953–1959
1953	Ian Monks	16	19	1953, 1955
1953	Jeff Gamble	90	14	1953–1960
1953	Mal Pascoe	94	41	1953–1958
1953	Kevin Bradley	5	1	1953–1954
1953	Hugh Mitchell	224	301	1953–1967
1954	Reg Burgess	124	9	1954–1960
1954	Bill Gnaden	2	0	1954
1954	Bob Taylor	34	1	1954–1956
1954	Ken Peucker	60	68	1954–1955, 1958–1961
1954	Jim McColl	3	0	1954, 1957
1954	Barry Colliver	7	1	1954–1955
1955	Doug Dench	27	0	1955–1956
1955	Robert Fox	52	34	1955–1957
1955	Warren Prest	3	0	1955–1956
1955	Ken Reed	2	0	1955
1955	Morton Diston	12	2	1955–1956
1955	Graham Willey	17	35	1955–1956
1955	Don Carmichael	15	1	1955–1957
1955	Keith Chapman	6	1	1955
1956	Fred Lynch	6	0	1956
1956	Bob Suter	22	0	1956–1958
1956	Ray Lalor	6	2	1956
1956	Max Nixon	6	1	1956
1956	Jack Clarkson	5	1	1956, 1958
1956	Bob Shearman	64	8	1956–1960
1957	John Birt	193	303	1957–1967
1957	Brian Donohoe	34	6	1957–1960
1957	Frank Driscoll	7	11	1957–1958
1957	Col Hebbard	85	24	1957–1961
1957	Ken Timms	134	112	1957–1965
1957	Leo Maloney	7	2	1957
1957	Alby Murdoch	65	7	1957–1962
1957	Eric Webster	11	0	1957–1958
1957	Trevor Elliott	7	1	1957–1958
1957	Bob Gluyas	9	15	1957–1958
1957	Les Pridham	1	0	1957
1957	Kevin Green	4	0	1957–1958
1958	Ken Fraser	198	157	1958–1968
1958	Kevin Parks	10	0	1958–1959
1958	Bill Box	9	4	1958
1958	Alec Epis	180	2	1958–1968
1958	Alby Yeo	5	0	1958
1958	Ron Evans	64	210	1958–1962
1958	Barry Mackie	27	8	1958–1960
1958	George Moloney	27	25	1958–1961
1959	Graham Leydin	35	18	1959–1961, 1964
1959	Don Nicolson	5	2	1959
1959	Brian Sampson	100	45	1959–1966
1959	David Shaw	177	55	1959–1968
1959	Geoff Barber	5	0	1959–1960
1959	Kevin Dellar	5	0	1959
1959	Ian Shelton	91	2	1959–1963, 1965
1959	Ian Burt	4	0	1959
1959	Barry Capuano	118	16	1959–1966
1959	Paul Doran	82	34	1959–1965

=== 1960s ===
Debut year	Player	Games	Goals	Years at club
1960	Bob Dunlop	27	28	1960–1961
1960	George Spero	5	0	1960
1960	John Somerville	106	96	1960–1967
1960	Don McKenzie	266	23	1960–1974
1960	Geoff Gosper	168	68	1960–1970
1960	Russell Blew	125	16	1960–1968
1961	Ted Fordham	128	214	1961–1969
1961	Barry Davis	218	65	1961–1972
1961	Ken Forge	15	0	1961–1962
1961	Alf King	13	6	1961–1962
1961	Graeme Beissel	36	17	1961–1962, 1964
1961	Terry Rodgers	38	42	1961–1964
1961	John Welsh	9	0	1961–1963
1962	Graeme Johnston	71	34	1962–1967
1962	Charlie Payne	184	128	1962–1972
1962	Ian Graham	5	2	1962–1963
1962	Barry Matthews	12	2	1962–1964
1962	Max Byers	7	0	1962–1963
1962	Bill Lieschke	1	0	1962
1963	Noel Raitt	18	7	1963–1964
1963	Garry Fenton	6	0	1963–1964
1963	Greg Brown	83	4	1963–1969
1963	John Booth	2	0	1963
1963	Jim Forsyth	29	4	1963–1967
1963	Darryl Gerlach	168	6	1963–1972
1963	Kevin Egan	65	13	1963–1969
1964	Lindsay McGie	31	2	1964–1965, 1968–1969
1965	Don Gross	121	105	1965–1974
1965	John Williams	161	14	1965–1973
1965	Keith Gent	7	0	1965–1966
1965	Bruce Armstrong	7	0	1965–1966
1965	Geoff Pryor	137	8	1973–1974
1965	Bruce Waite	48	29	1965–1969
1965	Ian Payne	45	11	1965–1967, 1969–1971
1966	Allan Hird, Jr.	4	0	1966–1967
1966	Alan Noonan	182	420	1966–1976
1966	Bob Wilson	4	0	1966
1967	John Ellis	44	43	1967–1971
1967	Bill Thompson	17	2	1967–1969
1967	Neil Evans	12	7	1967–1968
1967	Ken Fletcher	264	55	1967–1980
1967	Ian Anderson	27	49	1971
1967	Bob Greenwood	62	70	1967–1971
1967	Wally Buhaj	15	3	1967–1969
1968	Paul Sproule	60	60	1968–1971
1968	Peter Daniel	100	54	1968–1974
1968	Geoff Blethyn	84	216	1976
1968	Bruce Lake	30	36	1968–1970
1968	Robin Close	147	233	1968–1978
1968	Eddie Lake	39	14	1968–1973
1968	Ian Crowley	1	0	1968
1968	Robert Thompson	8	0	1968, 1970–1971
1968	John Fanning	6	1	1968–1970
1968	Les Stillman	24	32	1968–1970
1968	Vic Papp	1	0	1968
1969	David Collins	14	6	1969–1970
1969	Gary Crouch	9	1	1969–1970
1969	John Sinclair	2	0	1969
1969	Stuart Barclay	38	3	1969–1973
1969	Doug Tassell	20	0	1969–1970
1969	Ian Stevenson	10	2	1969–1970
1969	Roger Hampson	10	1	1971
1969	Wayne Headlam	60	25	1969–1973
1969	John Carpenter	2	1	1969
1969	Neville Fields	140	138	1969–1977, 1981–1982

=== 1970s ===
Debut year	Player	Games	Goals	Years at club
1970	Gary Grainger	30	19	1970–1972
1970	Greg Perry	63	38	1970, 1972–1974, 1976
1970	Bryan Pirouet	14	0	1970–1971
1970	Bruce Neish	21	13	1970–1971
1970	David Starbuck	13	2	1970–1971
1970	Len Halley	35	11	1970–1973
1970	John May	3	1	1970
1970	Ken Roberts	100	111	1970–1977
1970	Gary Parkes	96	39	1970–1976
1970	Sandy Talbot	33	0	1970–1973
1971	Rod McFarlane	4	3	1971
1971	Graeme Schultz	77	115	1971–1974, 1981–1983
1971	Bruce Dodson	11	3	1971
1971	Ken Hogan	18	9	1971–1972
1971	Hugh Delahunty	46	18	1971–1973
1971	Barry Grinter	78	7	1971–1972, 1974–1976
1971	Ray Smith	77	1	1971–1975
1971	Andy Wilson	112	129	1971–1977
1971	John Cassin	51	32	1971–1974
1971	Trevor Heath	1	0	1971
1971	Allan Graco	8	2	1971
1971	Mick Bates	2	1	1971
1971	Laurie Moloney	80	8	1971–1976
1972	Des Tuddenham	69	66	1972–1975
1972	Peter Hickmott	58	18	1972–1977
1972	Bruce Brown	1	0	1972
1972	Pat Wellington	58	42	1972–1976
1973	Graham Moss	84	67	1973–1976
1973	Russell Ellen	35	5	1973–1977
1973	Ross Wright	11	0	1973–1974
1973	Graham Middleton	1	0	1973
1973	Robert Amos	54	15	1973–1976, 1978–1979
1973	Ron Andrews	151	32	1973–1983
1973	Rob Newton	59	22	1973–1978
1973	Trevor Tyler	12	0	1973–1976
1973	John Emin	3	1	1973
1974	Steve Beaumont	37	46	1974–1976
1974	Graeme Jenkin	22	10	1974–1976
1974	Garry Lowe	8	0	1974
1974	Robert Shaw	51	8	1974–1981
1974	Max Crow	136	139	1974,1976–1982
1974	Garry Foulds	300	140	1974–1989
1974	Howard Staehr	5	0	1974,1976
1974	Dean Hartigan	36	1	1974–1977
1974	Simon Madden	378	575	1974–1992
1974	Tom Park	3	0	1974
1974	Gary Fitzpatrick	13	10	1974–1975
1974	Stephen Robins	80	75	1974–1980
1975	Greg Bell	22	1	1975,1977–1978
1975	Jim Demetriou	9	2	1975–1976
1975	Graeme Hatcher	9	0	1975–1976
1975	Maurice Boyse	9	1	1975
1975	Bill Berry	14	4	1975–1977
1975	Brian Walsh	51	100	1975–1978
1975	Larry Watson	31	2	1975–1978
1975	Paul McDonald	10	4	1975–1978
1975	Andrew Radchenko	1	0	1975
1976	Ian Marsh	68	16	1976–1980
1976	Geoff Burdett	37	46	1976–1978, 1981
1976	Terry Cahill	28	22	1976–1978
1976	Ken Mansfield	48	34	1976–1980
1976	Denis Scanlon	66	7	1976–1981
1976	Jack Mihocek	13	8	1976–1978
1977	Neil Clarke	135	35	1977–1987
1977	Gary Young	5	1	1977
1977	Colin Boyd	34	0	1977–1979
1977	Merv Neagle	147	52	1977–1985
1977	Russell Muir	67	3	1977–1981
1977	Shane Heard	168	39	1977–1987, 1991
1977	Steven Taubert	64	30	1977–1981
1977	Paul Vander Haar	201	278	1977–1990
1977	Don Mattson	1	0	1977
1977	Wayne Primmer	40	74	1977–1979
1977	Tim Watson	307	335	1977–1991, 1993–1994
1977	Phillip Early	10	3	1977
1978	Terry Daniher	294	447	1978–1992
1978	Allan Davis	33	27	1978–1979
1978	Bernie Jones	13	11	1978
1978	Roger Merrett	149	148	1978–1987
1978	Michael Sheldon	11	3	1978–1980
1978	Peter Bennett	67	22	1978–1981
1978	Neil Besanko	35	1	1978–1981
1978	Michael Redenbach	3	0	1978
1978	Glenn Hawker	200	172	1978–1988
1979	Neale Daniher	82	32	1979–1981, 1985, 1989–1990
1979	Barry Day	15	15	1979–1980
1979	Peter Keenan	31	17	1979–1980
1979	Alan Reid	45	18	1979–1983
1979	Craig Barbary	8	5	1979
1979	Darren Williams	109	94	1979, 1983–1989
1979	Frank Dunell	100	57	1979–1986
1979	Kelvin Steel	6	0	1979
1979	Robert Hyde	1	0	1979

=== 1980s ===
Debut year	Player	Games	Goals	Years at club
1980	Phil Carman	10	12	1980–1981
1980	Alan Stoneham	72	20	1980–1983
1980	Jim McAllester	2	0	1980
1980	Wayne Foreman	26	30	1980–1981
1980	Grant Fowler	63	49	1980–1983
1980	David Burke	3	6	1980
1980	Peter Light	2	0	1980
1980	Barry Besanko	3	3	1980
1980	Justin Madden	45	20	1980–1982
1980	Stephen Carey	105	6	1980–1986
1980	Michael Davis	4	1	1980, 1982–1983
1980	Greg Flanegan	2	3	1980
1980	Mark Eustice	29	19	1980–1984
1980	Bill Valli	1	0	1980
1981	Tony Buhagiar	83	135	1981–1984
1981	Michael Thomson	46	31	1981–1983, 1985–1986
1981	Kevin Walsh	162	20	1981–1991
1981	Ian Morrison	3	0	1981
1982	Stephen Copping	42	88	1982–1984
1982	Billy Duckworth	126	64	1982–1990
1982	Wayne Otway	36	65	1982–1983
1982	Tony West	8	8	1982–1984
1982	Roy Ramsay	3	0	1982
1982	Chris Waterson	31	11	1982–1986
1982	Brian Brown	2	0	1982
1982	Anton Grbac	2	0	1982
1983	Wayne Beddison	10	18	1983
1983	Cameron Clayton	17	1	1983
1983	Paul Salmon	224	520	1983–1995, 2002
1983	Mark Thompson	202	50	1983–1987, 1989–1996
1983	Paul Weston	60	12	1983–1985
1983	Peter Bradbury	49	19	1983–1986
1983	Rene Kink	20	35	1983, 1985
1983	Alan Ezard	184	200	1983–1993
1983	Bryan Wood	44	12	1983–1986
1983	Stephen Richardson	1	2	1983
1984	Leon Baker	86	70	1984–1988
1984	Doug Cox	3	0	1984
1984	Tony Elshaug	65	75	1984–1987
1984	Mark Harvey	206	170	1984–1997
1984	Peter Banfield	11	3	1984–1986
1984	Mark Hannebery	1	0	1984
1984	Brian Winton	32	4	1984–1988
1984	Merv Harbinson	2	0	1984–1985
1985	Steven Clark	53	73	1985–1989
1985	Stephen Pirrie	1	0	1985
1985	Trevor Spencer	31	28	1985–1989
1986	Brenton Phillips	10	3	1986
1986	Geoff Raines	14	2	1986
1986	David Flood	58	36	1986–1988, 1990–1995
1986	Paul Hamilton	105	7	1986–1992
1986	Mike Richardson	15	14	1986
1986	Dean Bailey	53	19	1986–1989, 1991–1992
1986	Ed Considine	49	12	1986–1992
1986	Nick Walsh	11	1	1986–1988
1987	Anthony Daniher	118	18	1987–1994
1987	Peter Francis	19	2	1987–1988
1987	Tony Antrobus	22	26	1987, 1989–1990
1987	Gavin Keane	29	18	1987–1988
1987	John Barnes	58	25	1987–1990, 2000–2001
1987	David Johnston	41	6	1987–1992
1987	Dean Wallis	127	42	1987–1989, 1991–2001
1987	Daryl Cunningham	7	5	1987
1987	David Sullivan	10	14	1987–1988
1987	Geoff Parker	3	0	1987,1989
1987	Chris Daniher	124	40	1987–1997
1987	Brendon Moore	7	1	1987–1988, 1990
1987	Gary O'Donnell	243	88	1987–1998
1988	Greg Anderson	103	60	1988–1992
1988	Darren Bewick	238	332	1988–2000
1988	Andrew Guthrie	5	0	1988
1988	Andrew Rogers	8	1	1988
1988	Paul O'Brien	3	2	1988
1988	Justin Stubbs	3	5	1988, 1990
1988	Peter Somerville	160	89	1988–1999
1988	Michael O'Sullivan	1	0	1988
1988	Peter Bourke	1	0	1988
1988	Bradley Plain	46	89	1988–1993
1989	David Grenvold	112	18	1989–1990, 1992–1996
1989	Michael Long	190	143	1989–1993, 1989–2001
1989	Kieran Sporn	72	65	1989–1993
1989	Andrew Underwood	12	4	1989–1990
1989	Michael Werner	40	60	1989–1992
1989	Andrew Manning	25	20	1989–1991
1989	Craig O'Brien	21	16	1989–1991

=== 1990s ===
Debut year	Player	Games	Goals	Years at club
1990	Peter Cransberg	79	72	1990–1997
1990	Derek Kickett	77	94	1990–1993
1990	Adrian Burns	11	7	1990–1991
1990	Ian McMullin	24	26	1990–1992
1991	Brad Fox	17	4	1991–1992
1991	Todd Ridley	25	21	1991–1994
1991	Gavin Wanganeen	127	64	1991–1996
1991	Peter Filandia	13	14	1991–1992
1991	Paul Hills	63	11	1991–1996
1991	Paul Morrish	7	0	1991
1991	David Robertson	3	1	1991
1992	Brendan Bower	3	3	1992
1992	Sean Denham	142	44	1992–2000
1992	Willie Dick	7	6	1992
1992	James Hird	253	343	1992–2007
1992	Michael Symons	109	80	1992–1999
1992	Glenn Kilpatrick	26	4	1992–1994
1992	Steven Alessio	184	193	1992–2003
1992	Mark Mercuri	207	242	1992–2004
1992	David Calthorpe	92	58	1992–1998
1992	Glenn Manton	21	4	1992–1994
1992	Joe Misiti	236	94	1992–2004
1993	Tony Delaney	15	9	1993–1994
1993	Dustin Fletcher	400	71	1993–2015
1993	Rick Olarenshaw	77	14	1993–1998
1994	Che Cockatoo-Collins	85	109	1994–1998
1994	Ben Doolan	76	7	1994–1999
1994	Dale Kickett	8	7	1994
1994	Robert Stevenson	11	0	1994, 1997
1994	Damien Hardwick	153	13	1994–2001
1994	Russell Williams	3	1	1994
1994	Ryan O'Connor	63	47	1994–1998
1994	Barry Young	76	45	1994–1999
1994	Scott Cummings	40	83	1994–1996
1994	Lachlan Ross	2	1	1994
1994	Michael Prior	81	19	1994–2000
1994	Julian Kirzner	1	1	1994
1995	Tim Darcy	14	5	1995
1995	Shawn Lewfatt	3	2	1995
1995	Mark Fraser	65	26	1995–2000
1995	Gary Moorcroft	95	102	1995, 1997–2002
1995	Danny Morgan	16	2	1995–1997
1995	Matthew Lloyd	270	926	1995–2009
1996	Peter Berbakov	52	14	1996–1999
1996	Sean Wellman	178	25	1996–2004
1996	Scott Lucas	270	471	1996–2009
1996	Paul Barnard	140	75	1996–2003
1996	Justin Blumfield	129	86	1996–2002
1997	Andrew Bomford	13	5	1997–1998
1997	Blake Caracella	126	151	1997–2002
1997	Matthew Banks	3	1	1997–1998
1997	Andrew Ukovic	19	8	1997–1999
1997	Jason Johnson	184	109	1997–2008
1997	Chris Heffernan	123	46	1997–2002, 2006–2007
1997	Daniel McAlister	6	0	1997, 2001–2002
1997	Matthew Watson	1	0	1997
1998	Mark Bolton	124	50	1998–2007
1998	Simon Eastaugh	17	1	1998–1999
1998	Dean Solomon	158	56	1998–2001, 2003–2006
1998	Judd Lalich	17	4	1998–1999, 2001
1999	Mark Johnson	194	92	1999–2007
1999	Mark McVeigh	232	107	1999–2012
1999	Ilija Grgic	2	0	1999
1999	Dean Rioli	100	91	1999–2006
1999	Adam Ramanauskas	134	63	1999–2005, 2007–2008
1999	Danny Jacobs	81	23	1999–2003

=== 2000s ===
Debut year	Player	Games	Goals	Years at club
2000	Jonathon Robran	8	3	2000–2001
2000	Aaron Henneman	58	5	2000–2005
2001	Robert Forster-Knight	31	0	2001–2003
2001	Damien Peverill	144	32	2001–2008
2001	David Hille	197	153	2001–2013
2001	Cory McGrath	28	14	2001–2003
2001	Marc Bullen	44	9	2001–2005
2001	Jordan Bannister	14	0	2001–2003
2002	Ted Richards	33	19	2002–2005
2002	Joel Reynolds	38	13	2002–2006
2002	Shane Harvey	11	9	2002–2003
2002	Andrew Welsh	162	32	2002–2011
2002	James Davies	3	1	2002–2003
2002	Ken Hall	1	0	2002
2002	Sam Hunt	7	1	2002, 2005
2003	Damian Cupido	40	50	2003–2005
2003	Adam McPhee	142	83	2003–2009
2003	Darren Walsh	2	0	2003
2003	Jason Winderlich	129	83	2003–2015
2003	Jobe Watson	220	113	2003–2017
2003	Ben Haynes	21	11	2003–2005
2004	Matthew Allan	21	1	2004–2005
2004	Kepler Bradley	49	14	2004–2007
2004	Nathan Lovett-Murray	145	73	2004–2013
2004	Justin Murphy	40	28	2004–2005
2004	Brent Stanton	255	158	2004–2017
2004	Mark Alvey	14	3	2004–2005
2004	Ricky Dyson	114	43	2004–2012
2004	Jason Laycock	58	36	2004–2008
2005	Angus Monfries	150	165	2005–2012
2005	Tristan Cartledge	7	1	2005–2006
2005	Ty Zantuck	9	0	2005
2005	Andrew Lovett	88	93	2005–2009
2005	Paul Thomas	8	1	2005
2005	Henry Slattery	96	12	2005–2012
2005	Courtney Johns	21	18	2005–2008
2005	Jay Nash	43	10	2005–2009
2006	Scott Camporeale	19	5	2006–2007
2006	Paddy Ryder	170	117	2006–2014
2006	Courtenay Dempsey	133	35	2006–2016
2006	Andrew Lee	5	2	2006
2006	Ben Jolley	4	0	2006
2006	Sam Lonergan	79	39	2006–2012
2006	Richie Cole	7	0	2006–2007
2007	Alwyn Davey	100	120	2007–2013
2007	Leroy Jetta	93	80	2007–2014
2007	Mal Michael	37	5	2007–2008
2007	Bachar Houli	26	9	2007–2010
2007	Tom Hislop	7	2	2007–2008
2007	Scott Gumbleton	35	45	2007–2013
2007	Kyle Reimers	60	69	2007–2012
2007	Heath Hocking	126	45	2007–2017
2007	Jay Neagle	28	41	2007–2010
2008	Tayte Pears	70	3	2008–2016
2008	Jarrod Atkinson	17	5	2008–2010
2008	Darcy Daniher	6	0	2008–2009
2008	David Myers	123	40	2008–2019
2008	Tom Bellchambers	104	66	2008–2020
2008	Rhys Magin	4	2	2008
2008	Cale Hooker	219	122	2008–2021
2008	John Williams	1	0	2008
2009	Michael Hurley	194	109	2009–2022
2009	Hayden Skipworth	11	11	2009
2009	Michael Quinn	8	2	2009–2010
2009	David Zaharakis	226	136	2009–2021
2009	Brent Prismall	36	10	2009–2011

=== 2010s ===
Debut game	Player	Games	Goals	Years at club
2010	Jake Carlisle	85	54	2010–2015
2010	Travis Colyer	87	54	2010–2018
2010	Stewart Crameri	57	96	2010–2013
2010	Kyle Hardingham	65	21	2010–2014
2010	Ben Howlett	124	58	2010–2017
2010	Marcus Marigliani	2	2	2010
2010	Jake Melksham	114	57	2010–2015
2010	Tyson Slattery	1	1	2010
2010	Mark Williams	4	5	2010
2010	Alex Browne	11	4	2011–2015
2011	Dyson Heppell	253	68	2011–2024
2011	Michael Hibberd	84	11	2011–2016
2011	Michael Ross	2	0	2011
2012	Mark Baguley	134	35	2012–2019
2012	Cory Dell'Olio	16	16	2012–2014
2012	Elliot Kavanagh	12	2	2012–2015
2012	Brendan Lee	2	0	2012
2012	Jackson Merrett	56	23	2012–2018
2012	Nick O'Brien	14	4	2012–2015
2013	Joe Daniher	108	191	2013–2020
2013	Brendon Goddard	129	56	2013–2018
2013	Will Hams	13	4	2013–2016
2013	Nick Kommer	22	13	2013–2016
2014	Patrick Ambrose	87	23	2014–2021
2014	Jason Ashby	12	0	2014–2016
2014	Kurt Aylett	2	0	2014–2015
2014	Paul Chapman	29	30	2014–2015
2014	Orazio Fantasia	80	111	2014–2020
2014	Martin Gleeson	97	5	2014–2021
2014	Zach Merrett^	274	97	2014–present
2014	Ariel Steinberg	10	0	2014–2015
2014	Dylan Van Unen	1	0	2014
2015	Adam Cooney	31	16	2015–2016
2015	James Gwilt	26	0	2015–2016
2015	Kyle Langford^	181	183	2015–present
2015	Shaun McKernan	53	51	2015–2020
2015	Shaun Edwards	12	8	2015–2016
2015	Jayden Laverde	145	38	2015–2025
2015	Jonathan Giles	3	1	2015
2015	Conor McKenna	79	20	2015–2020
2015	Lauchlan Dalgleish	3	1	2013–2015
2016	Craig Bird	20	3	2016–2017
2016	Mitch Brown	55	59	2016–2019
2016	Ryan Crowley	8	2	2016
2016	Matt Dea	39	1	2016–2018
2016	James Kelly	40	2	2016–2017
2016	Matthew Leuenberger	29	4	2016–2018
2016	Anthony McDonald-Tipungwuti	129	165	2016–2021, 2023
2016	Darcy Parish^	179	57	2016–present
2016	Jonathan Simpkin	4	1	2016
2016	Mathew Stokes	11	6	2016
2016	Michael Hartley	44	1	2016
2016	Sam Grimley	4	5	2016
2016	James Polkinghorne	7	1	2016
2016	Nathan Grima	2	0	2016
2016	Mason Redman^	159	27	2016–present
2016	Mark Jamar	5	3	2016
2016	Sam Michael	2	0	2016
2016	Aaron Francis	54	12	2016–2022
2016	Jake Long	5	1	2016–2019
2017	Josh Green	24	25	2017–2018
2017	Andrew McGrath^	200	23	2017–present
2017	Ben McNiece	15	0	2017–2019
2017	James Stewart	60	52	2017–2022
2017	Josh Begley	17	15	2017–2020
2018	Adam Saad	61	5	2018–2020
2018	Devon Smith	73	46	2018–2022
2018	Jake Stringer	123	207	2018–2024
2018	Matt Guelfi^	124	69	2018–present
2018	Kobe Mutch	5	1	2018–2020
2018	Dylan Clarke	24	6	2018–2021
2018	Jordan Ridley^	111	2	2018–present
2019	Dylan Shiel	99	29	2019–2025
2019	Zac Clarke	9	0	2019
2019	Brayden Ham	45	9	2019–2022
2019	Will Snelling	64	28	2019–2023
2019	Brandon Zerk-Thatcher	51	0	2019–2023
2019	Tom Jok	1	0	2019

=== 2020s ===
Debut game	Player	Games	Goals	Years at club
2020	Tom Cutler	30	8	2020–2023
2020	Jacob Townsend	12	9	2020
2020	Mitchell Hibberd	5	0	2020
2020	Andrew Phillips	41	13	2020–2023
2020	Ned Cahill	6	3	2020–2021
2020	Sam Draper	78	43	2020–2025
2020	Irving Mosquito	4	2	2020
2021	Jye Caldwell^	95	36	2021–present
2021	Nik Cox^	61	21	2021–present
2021	Nick Hind	74	15	2021–2024
2021	Harrison Jones^	66	57	2021–present
2021	Peter Wright^	104	176	2021–present
2021	Archie Perkins^	117	72	2021–present
2021	Alec Waterman	22	27	2021–2022
2021	Zach Reid^	42	1	2021–present
2021	Nick Bryan^	36	4	2021–present
2021	Sam Durham^	111	38	2021–present
2022	Kaine Baldwin	8	2	2022–2024
2022	Jake Kelly	58	3	2022–2024
2022	Nic Martin^	83	62	2022–present
2022	Tex Wanganeen	5	1	2022–2024
2022	Ben Hobbs	65	21	2022–2025
2022	Alastair Lord	1	0	2022–2023
2022	Massimo D'Ambrosio	16	5	2022–2023
2022	Jye Menzie	46	36	2022–2025
2023	Alwyn Davey Jr.	20	9	2023–2025
2023	Will Setterfield^	38	6	2023–present
2023	Sam Weideman	17	15	2023–2024
2023	Elijah Tsatas^	22	4	2023–present
2024	Xavier Duursma^	55	27	2024–present
2024	Todd Goldstein	30	3	2024–2025
2024	Jade Gresham^	48	35	2024–present
2024	Ben McKay^	48	6	2024–present
2024	Nate Caddy^	49	75	2024–present
2024	Archie Roberts^	48	5	2024–present
2025	Isaac Kako^	38	24	2025–present
2025	Jaxon Prior^	45	1	2025–present
2025	Tom Edwards^	9	11	2025–present
2025	Saad El-Hawli^	17	3	2025–present
2025	Archer Day-Wicks^	26	8	2025–present
2025	Lewis Hayes^	1	0	2023–present
2025	Angus Clarke^	20	9	2025–present
2025	Zak Johnson^	16	0	2025–present
2025	Luamon Lual	12	4	2025
2025	Lachlan Blakiston^	28	3	2025–present
2025	Archer May^	17	21	2025–present
2025	Vigo Visentini^	5	1	2025–present
2025	Oskar Smartt	4	0	2025
2025	Liam McMahon^	7	12	2025–present
2025	Jayden Nguyen^	10	0	2025–present
2025	Rhys Unwin^	7	2	2025–present
2026	Brayden Fiorini^	2	1	2026-present
2026	Dyson Sharp^	15	3	2026-present
2026	Hussien El Achkar^	9	9	2026-present
2026	Max Kondogiannis^	12	1	2026-present
2026	Jacob Farrow^	21	4	2026-present
2026	Sullivan Robey^	15	9	2026-present
2026	Jaxon Artemis^	6	0	2026-present

== Other players ==
=== Listed players yet to make their debut for Essendon ===
Player	Date of birth	Acquired	Recruited from	Listed	
Player	Date of birth	Acquired	Recruited from	Rookie	Senior
Kayle Gerreyn	May 10, 2006	No. 37, 2024 national draft	West Perth (WAFL)	—N/a	2025–
Cillian Bourke	June 7, 2006	Category B rookie selection, 2025	County Offaly (GAA)	2026–	—N/a

== Essendon Football Club AFLW players ==
Key
Order	Players are listed in order of jumper number
Seasons	Includes Essendon only careers and spans from when a player was first listed with the club to their final year on the list
Debut	Debuts are for AFLW regular season and finals series matches only
Games	Statistics are for AFLW regular season and finals games only and are correct as of round one, 2024.
Goals	Statistics are for AFLW regular season and finals games only and are correct as of round one, 2024.

=== 2020s ===
Debut year	Player	Games	Goals	Years at club
2022 (S7)	Georgia Gee^	40	13	2022 (S7)–present
2022 (S7)	Daria Bannister^	37	25	2022 (S7)–present
2022 (S7)	Maddy Prespakis^	48	18	2022 (S7)–present
2022 (S7)	Danielle Marshall	12	1	2022 (S7)–2023
2022 (S7)	Bonnie Toogood^	41	36	2022 (S7)–present
2022 (S7)	Jacqui Vogt	24	8	2022 (S7)–2024
2022 (S7)	Alana Barba	12	0	2022 (S7)–2023
2022 (S7)	Joanne Doonan	11	2	2022 (S7)–2023
2022 (S7)	Lily-Rose Williamson	8	1	2022 (S7)–2024
2022 (S7)	Ellyse Gamble	39	7	2022 (S7)–2025
2022 (S7)	Olivia Barton	1	0	2022 (S7)
2022 (S7)	Federica Frew	6	0	2022 (S7)
2022 (S7)	Jordan Zanchetta	3	0	2022 (S7)
2022 (S7)	Mia Van Dyke	11	0	2022 (S7)–2025
2022 (S7)	Stephanie Cain^	46	5	2022 (S7)–present
2022 (S7)	Jess Wuetschner	17	5	2022 (S7)–2023
2022 (S7)	Amelia Radford^	30	6	2022 (S7)–present
2022 (S7)	Renee Tierney	4	1	2022 (S7)–2023
2022 (S7)	Sophie Alexander^	49	26	2022 (S7)–present
2022 (S7)	Alexandra Morcom^	43	2	2022 (S7)–present
2022 (S7)	Ashleigh Van Loon	26	0	2022 (S7)–2024
2022 (S7)	Sophie Van De Heuvel^	29	0	2022 (S7)–present
2022 (S7)	Mia Busch^	36	0	2022 (S7)–present
2022 (S7)	Stephanie Wales^	44	7	2022 (S7)–present
2022 (S7)	Megan Ryan	2	0	2022 (S7)
2022 (S7)	Paige Scott	28	12	2022 (S7)–2024
2022 (S7)	Amber Clarke	29	14	2022 (S7)–2024
2022 (S7)	Cat Phillips	10	4	2022 (S7)–2023
2023	Georgia Nanscawen^	39	2	2022 (S7)–present
2023	Kodi Jacques	15	1	2023–2024
2023	Brooke Walker^	29	4	2023–present
2023	Matilda Dyke^	29	1	2023–present
2023	Georgia Clarke^	38	1	2023–present
2023	Leah Cutting	1	0	2023
2023	Brooke Brown^	19	0	2023–present
2024	Emily Gough^	9	7	2024–present
2024	Maddi Gay^	16	0	2024–present
2024	Bess Keaney^	12	1	2024–present
2024	Chloe Adams^	18	3	2024–present
2024	Amy Gaylor^	28	2	2024–present
2025	Grace Belloni^	12	4	2025–present
2025	Holly Ridewood^	16	4	2025–present
2025	Taya Chambers^	10	0	2025–present
2025	Maggie MacLachlan^	15	4	2025–present
2025	Courtney Murphy^	7	1	2025–present
2025	Amelie Gladman	5	0	2025
2025	Jess Verbrugge	3	0	2025
2025	Sophie Strong^	5	0	2025–present
2025	Grace Brooker	5	2	2025
2025	Brooke Sheridan	1	0	2024-2025
2025	Bailey Hunt	1	0	2025
2026	Nalu Brothwell^	4	1	2026–present
2026	Maggie Johnstone^	4	2	2026–present
2026	Zoe Prowse^	4	0	2026–present

== See also ==
- List of Essendon Football Club coaches
