= Percy Watson (disambiguation) =

Percy Watson (born 1981) is an American professional wrestler and former professional football player.

Percy Watson may also refer to:

- Percy Watson (English footballer) (1869–1949), Australian rules footballer
- Percy Watson (Australian footballer) (1898–1965), Australian rules footballer
- Percy Watson (politician) (born 1951), American politician
- Percy Watson (bowls) (1894–?), Northern Ireland lawn bowler
