= Thomas Hedley (disambiguation) =

Thomas or Tom Hedley may refer to:

- Thomas Hedley (born 1942/43), British magazine editor and screenwriter
- Tom Hedley (footballer) (1882–1960), Australian rules footballer for Essendon

== See also ==
- Thomas Hedley Reynolds (1920–2009), American historian
- Thomas Hedley Co., former British soap and candles company
