= Michael Sheldon =

Michael Sheldon may refer to:

- Michael Sheldon (jurist)
- Michael Sheldon (footballer)
- Mike Sheldon, American football player
