= Neil King =

Neil King may refer to:

- Neil King (footballer) (1889–1955), Australian rules footballer
- Neil King (Canadian football) (born 1988), Canadian football defensive back
- Neil King (politician), Canadian politician
- Neil King Jr., American journalist and author
