= Charlie Haigbloom =

Australian rules footballer

Personal information
- Full name: Charles Augustus Hagblom
- Born: 5 August 1882; South Melbourne, Victoria
- Died: 12 April 1971 (aged 88); Fitzroy, Victoria

Playing career^{1}
Years	Club	Games (Goals)
1902, 1904	South Melbourne	6 (1)
1907	Essendon	9 (10)
Total		15 (11)
- ^{1} Playing statistics correct to the end of 1907.

Charlie Haigbloom (5 August 1882 – 12 April 1971) was an Australian rules footballer who played with South Melbourne and Essendon in the Victorian Football League (VFL).
