= Joe Shippen =

Australian rules footballer

Personal information
- Full name: Joseph Trail Shippen
- Born: 6 January 1876; Richmond, Victoria
- Died: 10 May 1952 (aged 76); Preston, Victoria
- Original team: Richmond Juniors

Playing career^{1}
Years	Club	Games (Goals)
1903	Essendon	1 (0)
- ^{1} Playing statistics correct to the end of 1903.

Joseph Trail Shippen (6 January 1876 – 10 May 1952) was an Australian rules footballer who played with Essendon in the Victorian Football League (VFL).
