= Bill Gregg =

Australian rules footballer, born 1914

Personal information
- Full name: Bill Gregg
- Born: 25 August 1914
- Died: 23 January 2000 (aged 85)
- Height: 170 cm (5 ft 7 in)
- Weight: 68 kg (150 lb)

Playing career^{1}
Years	Club	Games (Goals)
1943	Essendon	1 (0)
- ^{1} Playing statistics correct to the end of 1943.

Bill Gregg (25 August 1914 – 23 January 2000) was an Australian rules footballer who played with Essendon in the Victorian Football League (VFL).
