= Bill McCarthy (Australian rules footballer) =

Australian rules footballer

Personal information
- Full name: William Joseph McCarthy
- Nickname: Soldier
- Born: 6 August 1874; Corop, Victoria
- Died: 21 November 1940 (aged 66); Richmond, Victoria
- Original team: Footscray
- Positions: Full back, follower

Playing career^{1}
Years	Club	Games (Goals)
1902	Fitzroy	11 (0)
1903	Essendon	3 (0)
Total		14 (0)
- ^{1} Playing statistics correct to the end of 1903.

Bill McCarthy (6 August 1874 – 21 November 1940) was an Australian rules footballer who played with Fitzroy and Essendon in the Victorian Football League (VFL).

== Sources ==
- Holmesby, Russell & Main, Jim (2009). The Encyclopedia of AFL Footballers. 8th ed. Melbourne: Bas Publishing.
- Bill McCarthy's playing statistics from AFL Tables
- Essendon Football Club profile
