= Norm McCleary =

Australian rules footballer, born 1911

Personal information
- Full name: Norman Leslie McCleary
- Born: 14 July 1911; Talbot, Victoria
- Died: 21 July 2000 (aged 89)
- Original team: Watchupga

Playing career^{1}
Years	Club	Games (Goals)
1933	Essendon	2 (3)
- ^{1} Playing statistics correct to the end of 1933.

Norman Leslie McCleary (14 July 1911 – 21 July 2000) was an Australian rules footballer who played with Essendon in the Victorian Football League (VFL).

Talbot later served in the Australian Army during World War II.
