= Marcus Evans (footballer) =

Australian rules footballer

Personal information
- Full name: Marcus Evans
- Born: 10 November 1878
- Died: 1 June 1955 (aged 76)

Playing career^{1}
Years	Club	Games (Goals)
1901	Essendon	1 (0)
- ^{1} Playing statistics correct to the end of 1901.

Marcus Evans (10 November 1878 – 1 June 1955) was an Australian rules footballer who played with Essendon in the Victorian Football League (VFL).
