= Billy Hall (Australian footballer) =

Australian rules footballer

Personal information
- Full name: Gordon Leslie Hall
- Born: 30 September 1915; Essendon, Victoria
- Died: 28 June 2002 (aged 86); Springvale, Victoria
- Original team: Woodlands
- Height: 182 cm (6 ft 0 in)
- Weight: 74 kg (163 lb)
- Position: Wingman

Playing career^{1}
Years	Club	Games (Goals)
1935–38, 1942	Essendon	22 (9)
1942	Fitzroy	2 (0)
1934, 1939–41, 1945	Coburg (VFA)	60 (22)
- ^{1} Playing statistics correct to the end of 1945.

Gordon Leslie "Billy" Hall (30 September 1915 – 28 June 2002) was an Australian rules footballer who played with Essendon and Fitzroy in the Victorian Football League (VFL). He also played with Coburg in the Victorian Football Association (VFA).
