= Bill Wylie (footballer) =

Australian rules footballer

Personal information
- Full name: William Henry Wylie
- Born: 7 December 1891; Fitzroy North, Victoria
- Died: 7 July 1974 (aged 82); Toorak, Victoria

Playing career^{1}
| Years | Club | Games (Goals) |
| 1915, 1918 | Essendon | 9 (1) |
- ^{1} Playing statistics correct to the end of 1918.

William Henry Wylie (7 December 1891 – 7 July 1974) was an Australian rules footballer who played with Essendon in the Victorian Football League (VFL).
