= Vern Sarsfield =

Australian rules footballer, born 1905

Personal information
- Full name: Vernard Isaac Sarsfield
- Born: 10 December 1905; Essendon, Victoria
- Died: 21 January 1984 (aged 78); Yarrawonga, Victoria
- Original team: Essendon C.Y.M.S. (CYMSFA)

Playing career^{1}
Years	Club	Games (Goals)
1929	Essendon	2 (1)
- ^{1} Playing statistics correct to the end of 1929.

Vernard Isaac Sarsfield (10 December 1905 – 21 January 1984) was an Australian rules footballer who played with Essendon in the Victorian Football League (VFL).

== Family ==
The son of Michael Christopher Sarsfield (1869–1920), and Emily Easter (1870—1939), née O'Sullivan, Vernard Isaac Sarsfield was born at Essendon, Victoria on 10 December 1905.

He married Jean Mary Valentine (1918-2009) on 10 April 1939.

== Football ==
Sarsfield played for Essendon in the first two rounds of the 1929 season before being dropped to the reserves team. In 1936 he moved to Ouyen and played with the Ouyen Rovers club.

== Military service ==
Sarsfield served in the Australian Army during World War II, enlisting under the name "Vernon Sarsfield".

== Death ==
He died at Yarrawonga, Victoria on 21 January 1984.
