= Phil Gibson (footballer) =

Australian rules footballer

Personal information
- Full name: Philip Alexander Gibson
- Born: 30 March 1887; Footscray, Victoria
- Died: 4 October 1939 (aged 52); Camberwell, Victoria
- Original team: Yarraville Juniors
- Height: 180 cm (5 ft 11 in)
- Weight: 80 kg (176 lb)

Playing career^{1}
| Years | Club | Games (Goals) |
| 1906–1907 | Essendon | 14 (0) |
- ^{1} Playing statistics correct to the end of 1907.

Philip Alexander Gibson (30 March 1887 – 4 October 1939) was an Australian rules footballer who played with Essendon in the Victorian Football League (VFL).

== Death ==
He died in Camberwell, Victoria on 4 October 1939.
