= Maurie Edwards =

Australian rules footballer

Personal information
- Full name: Maurice Cooper Edwards
- Born: 17 October 1922; Newmarket, Victoria
- Died: 26 February 2007 (aged 84)
- Original team: Moonee Imperials
- Height: 185 cm (6 ft 1 in)
- Weight: 83 kg (183 lb)

Playing career^{1}
Years	Club	Games (Goals)
1942–43	Essendon	5 (0)
1947	North Melbourne	3 (0)
Total		8 (0)
- ^{1} Playing statistics correct to the end of 1947.

Maurice Cooper Edwards (17 October 1922 – 26 February 2007) was an Australian rules footballer who played with Essendon and North Melbourne in the Victorian Football League (VFL).

Edwards served in the Australian Army during World War II.
