= Ian Crowley =

Australian rules footballer

Personal information
- Full name: Ian C. Crowley
- Born: 4 April 1948 (age 78)
- Original team: Pascoe Vale
- Height: 178 cm (5 ft 10 in)
- Weight: 64 kg (141 lb)
- Position: Half-forward

Playing career^{1}
| Years | Club | Games (Goals) |
| 1968 | Essendon | 1 (0) |
- ^{1} Playing statistics correct to the end of 1968.

Ian Crowley (born 4 April 1948) is a former Australian rules footballer who played with Essendon in the Victorian Football League (VFL). He later played for Brunswick in the Victorian Football Association (VFA) and Berwick, before coaching Noble Park Methodists and Old Mentone Grammarians.
