= Bob Gluyas =

Australian rules footballer

Personal information
- Full name: Robert C. Gluyas
- Born: 2 February 1937
- Original team: North Essendon Methodists
- Height: 185 cm (6 ft 1 in)
- Weight: 76 kg (168 lb)
- Position: Full-forward

Playing career^{1}
| Years | Club | Games (Goals) |
| 1957–58 | Essendon | 9 (15) |
- ^{1} Playing statistics correct to the end of 1958.

Bob Gluyas (born 2 February 1937) is a former Australian rules footballer who played with Essendon in the Victorian Football League (VFL). Gluyas returned to his old team, North Essendon Methodists, in 1960 after seriously injuring his ankle in 1958.
