= Mal MacRae =

Australian rules footballer, born 1907

Personal information
- Full name: Malcolm MacRae
- Born: 17 October 1907; Ascot Vale, Victoria
- Died: 26 September 1947 (aged 39)
- Height: 185 cm (6 ft 1 in)
- Weight: 85 kg (187 lb)

Playing career^{1}
Years	Club	Games (Goals)
1930–31	Essendon	19 (14)
1932	Fitzroy	6 (6)
Total		25 (20)
- ^{1} Playing statistics correct to the end of 1932.

Malcolm MacRae (17 October 1907 – 26 September 1947) was an Australian rules footballer who played with Essendon and Fitzroy in the Victorian Football League (VFL).
