= Alby Stamp =

Australian rules footballer

Personal information
- Full name: Albert Richard Stamp
- Born: 26 December 1879; Maryborough, Victoria
- Died: 16 May 1971 (aged 91); Elsternwick, Victoria
- Original team: Booroondara

Playing career^{1}
Years	Club	Games (Goals)
1897, 1899	Essendon	5 (2)
- ^{1} Playing statistics correct to the end of 1899.

Alby Stamp (26 December 1879 – 16 May 1971) was an Australian rules footballer who played for the Essendon Football Club in the Victorian Football League (VFL).
