= Tommy Crow =

Australian rules footballer

Personal information
- Full name: Joel Thomas Crow
- Born: 30 June 1887; Lal Lal, Victoria
- Died: 26 May 1958 (aged 70); Hawthorn, Victoria
- Original team: Essendon Juniors

Playing career^{1}
Years	Club	Games (Goals)
1908	Essendon	4 (0)
1910	Melbourne	7 (1)
Total		11 (1)
- ^{1} Playing statistics correct to the end of 1910.

Joel Thomas Crow (30 June 1887 – 26 May 1958) was an Australian rules footballer who played with Essendon and Melbourne in the Victorian Football League (VFL).
