= Bill Webb (Australian footballer) =

Australian rules footballer

Personal information
- Full name: William Campbell Hatchell Webb
- Born: 6 July 1883; Bairnsdale, Victoria
- Died: 11 May 1947 (aged 63); Eagle Point, Victoria
- Original team: Melbourne Grammar

Playing career^{1}
Years	Club	Games (Goals)
1902	Essendon	1 (1)
- ^{1} Playing statistics correct to the end of 1902.

William Campbell Hatchell Webb (6 July 1883 – 11 May 1947) was an Australian rules footballer who played with Essendon in the Victorian Football League (VFL).
