= Don Nicolson =

Australian rules footballer

Personal information
- Full name: Don Nicolson
- Born: 5 November 1939; Colac
- Original team: Colac
- Height: 173 cm (5 ft 8 in)
- Weight: 73 kg (161 lb)
- Position: Rover

Playing career^{1}
Years	Club	Games (Goals)
1959	Essendon	5 (3)
- ^{1} Playing statistics correct to the end of 1959.

Don Nicolson (born 5 November 1939) is a former Australian rules footballer who played with Essendon in the Victorian Football League (VFL). Nicolson returned to his original club, Colac, after one season with Essendon. In 1963, he won the Hampden Football League best and fairest. Nicolson was later captain-coach of South Colac before coming back to Colac in the 1970s in the positions of under-18s coach and club president.
