= Ken Adam (footballer) =

Australian rules footballer

Personal information
- Born: 11 August 1900
- Died: 23 July 1968 (aged 67)
- Height: 182 cm (6 ft 0 in)
- Weight: 76 kg (168 lb)

Playing career^{1}
Years	Club	Games (Goals)
1922–25	Essendon	31 (0)
- ^{1} Playing statistics correct to the end of 1925.

Ken Adam (11 August 1900 – 23 July 1968) was an Australian rules footballer who played with Essendon in the Victorian Football League (VFL).
