= Flurence Moore =

Australian rules footballer

Personal information
- Full name: Flurence Dominic Moore
- Born: 17 November 1890; Brunswick, Victoria
- Died: 13 December 1953 (aged 63); Perth, Western Australia
- Original team: Boulder City
- Height: 174 cm (5 ft 9 in)

Playing career^{1}
Years	Club	Games (Goals)
1915	Essendon	7 (2)
- ^{1} Playing statistics correct to the end of 1915.

Flurence Dominic Moore (17 November 1890 – 13 December 1953) was an Australian rules football player.

== Playing career ==
After beginning his career for Boulder City in Western Australia, Moore moved to Essendon, playing seven matches during the 1915 VFL season.
