= Bill Turner (footballer, born 1912) =

Australian rules footballer, born 1912

Personal information
- Full name: Bill Turner
- Born: 11 November 1912
- Died: 22 September 1981 (aged 68)
- Original team: Launceston
- Height: 178 cm (5 ft 10 in)
- Weight: 83 kg (183 lb)

Playing career^{1}
Years	Club	Games (Goals)
1934–36	Essendon	28 (3)
- ^{1} Playing statistics correct to the end of 1936.

Bill Turner (11 November 1912 – 22 September 1981) was an Australian rules footballer who played with Essendon in the Victorian Football League (VFL).
