= Barry Day (footballer) =

Australian rules footballer

Personal information
- Full name: Barry Thomas Day
- Born: 27 February 1954 (age 72)
- Original team: West Perth
- Height: 183 cm (6 ft 0 in)
- Weight: 83 kg (183 lb)

Playing career^{1}
| Years | Club | Games (Goals) |
| 1979–1980 | Essendon | 15 (15) |
- ^{1} Playing statistics correct to the end of 1980.

Barry Thomas Day (born 27 February 1954) is a former Australian rules footballer who played for the Essendon Football Club in the Victorian Football League (VFL). He was recruited from West Perth in the West Australian Football League (WAFL).
