= Pat Barr =

Australian rules footballer

Personal information
- Full name: William Patrick Barr
- Born: 3 February 1878; Richmond, Victoria
- Died: 5 September 1945 (aged 67); Moonee Ponds, Victoria

Playing career^{1}
| Years | Club | Games (Goals) |
| 1898 | Essendon | 3 (1) |
- ^{1} Playing statistics correct to the end of 1898.

William Patrick Barr (3 February 1878 – 5 September 1945) was an Australian rules footballer who played with Essendon in the Victorian Football League (VFL).

'Snowy' Barr then played four games and kicked two goals for Williamstown in the VFA in 1899 before crossing to Essendon Town/Association Club in 1900.
