= Tom Williams (Australian footballer, born 1876) =

Australian rules footballer (1876–1938)

Personal information
- Full name: Thomas James Williams
- Born: 28 May 1876; Sale, Victoria
- Died: 18 September 1938 (aged 62); Ballarat, Victoria
- Original team: Richmond (VFA)

Playing career^{1}
Years	Club	Games (Goals)
1898–1899	Richmond (VFA)	
1900–1902	Leopold (MDFL)	
1902	West Perth (WAFA)	
1903	Essendon	2 (0)
1903	Leopold (MDFL)	
1904–1906	Richmond (VFA)	
- ^{1} Playing statistics correct to the end of 1906.

Career highlights
- 1905 VFA premiership

Thomas James Williams (28 May 1876 – 18 Sept 1938) was an Australian rules footballer who played with Essendon in the Victorian Football League (VFL).

== Early life ==
The son of David Elias Williams and Beatrice Williams, nee Nicol, Thomas James Williams was born at Sale on 28 May 1876.

He married Alice Muriel Estella Beer (1888–1951) in 1909. Alice married John Henry Landvogt (1871–1949) in 1939.

== Football ==
=== Richmond ===
In 1898 Tom Williams commenced his senior football career with Richmond in the Victorian Football Association, joining his brother Hugh at the club.

=== Leopold ===
Williams (and his brother) were granted a clearance to St Kilda at the start of the 1900 season but he is not credited with any games for St Kilda and he played with the Leopold club from 1901 until part way through the 1902 season.

=== West Perth ===
In 1902 Williams briefly played with the West Perth club in the West Australian Football Association.

=== Essendon ===
At the start of the 1903 season Williams played two VFL games for Essendon.

=== Leopold ===
After failing to gain a consistent place with Essendon, Williams returned to Leopold for the remainder of the 1903 season and was appointed as captain of the side.

=== Richmond ===
In 1904 Williams returned to Richmond and played for three more seasons, in total making 49 appearances for the team. He was a ruckman and a prominent player in their 1905 VFA premiership winning team.

== Later life ==
Williams later moved to Ballarat where he died on 18 Sept 1938. He is buried at the Ballarat New Cemetery.
