= Les Kittle =

Australian rules footballer

Personal information
- Full name: Leslie Gordon Kittle
- Born: 26 February 1894; Shepparton, Victoria
- Died: 28 March 1965 (aged 71); St Kilda East, Victoria
- Original team: Shepparton
- Height: 173 cm (5 ft 8 in)
- Weight: 70 kg (154 lb)

Playing career^{1}
| Years | Club | Games (Goals) |
| 1919 | Carlton | 15 (0) |
| 1924 | Essendon | 1 (0) |
| Total | | 16 (0) |
- ^{1} Playing statistics correct to the end of 1924.

Leslie Gordon Kittle (26 February 1894 – 28 March 1965) was an Australian rules footballer who played with Carlton and Essendon in the Victorian Football League (VFL).
