= Tom Sevior =

Australian rules footballer

Personal information
- Full name: Thomas Sevior
- Born: 26 October 1887; Flemington, Victoria
- Died: 22 July 1935 (aged 47); Melbourne, Victoria
- Original team: Footscray (VFA)
- Height: 178 cm (5 ft 10 in)
- Weight: 86 kg (190 lb)

Playing career^{1}
Years	Club	Games (Goals)
1907–09	Footscray (VFA)	51 (12)
1908	Essendon	1 (0)
1911–19	Essendon A (VFA)	90 (40)
- ^{1} Playing statistics correct to the end of 1919.

Thomas Sevior (26 October 1887 – 22 July 1935) was an Australian rules footballer who played with Essendon in the Victorian Football League (VFL).
