= Teddy Gardiner =

Australian rules footballer (1890–1938)

Personal information
- Full name: Edward Gardiner
- Born: 9 November 1890; North Melbourne, Victoria
- Died: 16 September 1938 (aged 47); Heidelberg, Victoria
- Height: 179 cm (5 ft 10 in)
- Weight: 81 kg (179 lb)

Playing career^{1}
Years	Club	Games (Goals)
1921–22	Essendon	8 (0)
- ^{1} Playing statistics correct to the end of 1922.

Teddy Gardiner (9 November 1890 – 16 September 1938) was an Australian rules footballer who played with Essendon in the Victorian Football League (VFL).

The son of James Henry Gardiner, Teddy Gardiner first played football with North Melbourne in the VFA prior to World War I.
