= Bruce Godfrey =

Australian rules footballer

Personal information
- Full name: Bruce Maitland Godfrey
- Born: 27 March 1885; Sheffield, Tasmania
- Died: 7 October 1947 (aged 62); St Kilda, Victoria
- Original team: Trentham
- Position: Forward

Playing career^{1}
Years	Club	Games (Goals)
1910	Richmond	1 (1)
1912	Essendon	1 (0)
Total		2 (1)
- ^{1} Playing statistics correct to the end of 1912.

Bruce Maitland Godfrey (27 March 1885 – 7 October 1947) was an Australian rules footballer who played with Richmond and Essendon in the Victorian Football League (VFL).
