= Dick Gosling =

Australian rules footballer, born 1901

Personal information
- Full name: Dick Gosling
- Born: 26 July 1901
- Died: 27 February 1999 (aged 97)
- Height: 183 cm (6 ft 0 in)
- Weight: 79 kg (174 lb)

Playing career^{1}
Years	Club	Games (Goals)
1926–27	Essendon	5 (11)
- ^{1} Playing statistics correct to the end of 1927.

Dick Gosling (26 July 1901 – 27 February 1999) was an Australian rules footballer who played with Essendon in the Victorian Football League (VFL).
