= Jack McGarity =

Australian rules footballer

Personal information
- Full name: Jack Melville Francis McGarity
- Born: 16 January 1897; Carlton, Victoria
- Died: 16 March 1974 (aged 77); Coffs Harbour, New South Wales

Playing career^{1}
Years	Club	Games (Goals)
1918	Essendon	2 (0)
- ^{1} Playing statistics correct to the end of 1918.

Jack Melville Francis McGarity (16 January 1897 – 16 March 1974) was an Australian rules footballer who played with Essendon in the Victorian Football League (VFL).

McGarity was born Jack Melville Francis to the unmarried Ellen Francis in Carlton Women's Hospital in 1897. In 1898 Ellen married William McGarity, and Jack assumed the surname of his stepfather.
