= Pat Robertson (footballer) =

Australian rules footballer (1895–1947)

Personal information
- Full name: Patrick George Robertson
- Born: 30 November 1895; Brunswick, Victoria
- Died: 8 October 1947 (aged 51); South Melbourne, Victoria

Playing career^{1}
Years	Club	Games (Goals)
1919–20	Essendon	18 (1)
- ^{1} Playing statistics correct to the end of 1920.

Patrick George Robertson (30 November 1895 – 8 October 1947) was an Australian rules footballer who played with Essendon in the Victorian Football League (VFL).
