= Bill Hanson (footballer) =

Australian rules footballer

Personal information
- Full name: Bill Hanson
- Born: 14 September 1893
- Died: 3 December 1946 (aged 53)
- Height: 177 cm (5 ft 10 in)
- Weight: 81 kg (179 lb)

Playing career^{1}
Years	Club	Games (Goals)
1918	Essendon	3 (1)
- ^{1} Playing statistics correct to the end of 1918.

Bill Hanson (14 September 1893 – 3 December 1946) was an Australian rules footballer who played with Essendon in the Victorian Football League (VFL).
