= Paul McDonald (Australian footballer) =

Australian rules footballer

Personal information
- Full name: Paul Scott McDonald
- Born: 27 April 1956 (age 70)
- Original team: Keilor
- Height: 185 cm (6 ft 1 in)
- Weight: 72 kg (159 lb)
- Position: Centre half-forward

Playing career^{1}
Years	Club	Games (Goals)
1975–78	Essendon	10 (4)
1980	Subiaco	8 (7)
- ^{1} Playing statistics correct to the end of 1980.

Paul McDonald (born 27 April 1956) is a former Australian rules footballer who played with Essendon in the Victorian Football League (VFL). He later played for Subiaco in the West Australian Football League (WAFL) and Victorian Football Association (VFA) sides Prahran and Port Melbourne.
