= Leo Glynn (footballer) =

Australian rules footballer, born 1903

Personal information
- Full name: Leo Glynn
- Born: 27 November 1903
- Died: 11 December 1983 (aged 80)

Playing career^{1}
Years	Club	Games (Goals)
1930	Essendon	9 (0)
- ^{1} Playing statistics correct to the end of 1930.

Leo Glynn (27 November 1903 – 11 December 1983) was an Australian rules footballer who played with Essendon in the Victorian Football League (VFL).
