= Rupe Dodd =

Australian rules footballer, born 1907

Personal information
- Full name: Rupert Ethelbert Dodd
- Born: 19 January 1907; Dunkeld, Victoria
- Died: 16 January 1998 (aged 90); Sydney, New South Wales
- Original team: Keilor
- Height: 168 cm (5 ft 6 in)
- Weight: 69 kg (152 lb)

Playing career^{1}
Years	Club	Games (Goals)
1927	Essendon	11 (19)
1931	Hawthorn	3 (4)
Total		14 (23)
- ^{1} Playing statistics correct to the end of 1931.

Rupert Ethelbert Dodd (19 January 1907 – 16 January 1998) was an Australian rules footballer who played with Essendon and Hawthorn in the Victorian Football League (VFL).
