= Terry Cahill (footballer, born 1958) =

Australian rules footballer

Personal information
- Full name: Terry Cahill
- Born: 30 April 1958 (age 68)
- Original team: North Ringwood
- Height: 180 cm (5 ft 11 in)
- Weight: 70 kg (154 lb)

Playing career^{1}
Years	Club	Games (Goals)
1976–1978	Essendon	28 (22)
- ^{1} Playing statistics correct to the end of 1978.

Terry Cahill (born 30 April 1958) is a former Australian rules footballer who played with Essendon in the Victorian Football League (VFL).

Cahill was knocked unconscious in a clash with St Kilda's Carl Ditterich in 1978. He retired soon after to become a school principal and retired and moved to Sydney in 2021.

He is the former Principal at Saint Agatha's Primary School in Cranbourne.
