= Eric Webster (Australian footballer) =

Australian rules footballer

Personal information
- Full name: Eric Donald Webster
- Born: 27 April 1936
- Died: 27 October 2016 (aged 80)
- Original team: Korumburra
- Height: 188 cm (6 ft 2 in)
- Weight: 83 kg (183 lb)
- Position: Follower

Playing career^{1}
Years	Club	Games (Goals)
1957–58	Essendon	11 (0)
- ^{1} Playing statistics correct to the end of 1958.

Eric Donald Webster (27 April 1936 – 27 October 2016) was an Australian rules footballer who played with Essendon in the Victorian Football League (VFL). He later played one season for Port Melbourne in the Victorian Football Association before returning to the country to play with Trafalgar.

He was the nephew of Essendon player, Len Webster.
