= Lloyd Middleton =

Australian rules footballer

Personal information
- Full name: Lloyd Middleton
- Born: 13 February 1928
- Died: 26 May 2015 (aged 87)
- Original team: University Blacks
- Height: 170 cm (5 ft 7 in)
- Weight: 76 kg (168 lb)

Playing career^{1}
Years	Club	Games (Goals)
1951	Essendon	2 (0)
- ^{1} Playing statistics correct to the end of 1951.

Lloyd Middleton (13 February 1928 – 26 May 2015) was an Australian rules footballer who played with Essendon in the Victorian Football League in 1951.

== Sources ==
- Holmesby, Russell & Main, Jim (2007). The Encyclopedia of AFL Footballers. 7th ed. Melbourne: Bas Publishing.
- Lloyd Middleton's playing statistics from AFL Tables
- Lloyd Middleton at AustralianFootball.com
