= Stephen Robins =

Australian rules footballer

Personal information
- Full name: Stephen Robins
- Born: 25 February 1957 (age 69)
- Original team: Hopetoun
- Height: 183 cm (6 ft 0 in)
- Weight: 86 kg (190 lb)
- Position: Centre

Playing career^{1}
Years	Club	Games (Goals)
1974–80	Essendon	80 (75)
- ^{1} Playing statistics correct to the end of 1980.

Stephen Robins (born 25 February 1957) is a former Australian rules footballer who played with Essendon in the Victorian Football League (VFL).
