= Bill Eastmure =

Australian rules footballer, born 1914

Personal information
- Full name: Bill Eastmure
- Born: 22 February 1914
- Died: 28 November 1998 (aged 84)
- Original team: Port Melbourne
- Height: 187 cm (6 ft 2 in)
- Weight: 84 kg (185 lb)

Playing career^{1}
Years	Club	Games (Goals)
1939	Essendon	1 (0)
1943	South Melbourne	4 (2)
Total		5 (2)
- ^{1} Playing statistics correct to the end of 1943.

Bill Eastmure (22 February 1914 – 28 November 1998) was an Australian rules footballer who played with Essendon and South Melbourne in the Victorian Football League (VFL).
