= Alby Kennedy =

Australian rules footballer

Personal information
- Full name: Albert Edward Kennedy
- Born: 12 June 1886; Merton, Victoria
- Died: 17 May 1960 (aged 73); Wangaratta, Victoria

Playing career^{1}
| Years | Club | Games (Goals) |
| 1909 | Essendon | 2 (2) |
- ^{1} Playing statistics correct to the end of 1909.

Albert Edward Kennedy (12 June 1886 – 17 May 1960) was an Australian rules footballer who played for the Essendon Football Club in the Victorian Football League (VFL).
