= Tommy Leahy (footballer) =

Australian rules footballer

Personal information
- Full name: Tommy Leahy
- Born: 5 August 1870
- Died: 14 October 1916 (aged 46)

Playing career^{1}
Years	Club	Games (Goals)
1900	Essendon	2 (0)
- ^{1} Playing statistics correct to the end of 1900.

Tommy Leahy (5 August 1870 – 14 October 1916) was an Australian rules footballer who played with Essendon in the Victorian Football League (VFL).
