= Merv Storey =

Australian rules footballer, born 1913

Personal information
- Full name: Henry Mervyn Storey
- Born: 20 November 1913; Mount Lawley, Western Australia
- Died: 13 July 1977 (aged 63); Maidstone, Victoria
- Original team: Mt Lawley
- Height: 177 cm (5 ft 10 in)
- Weight: 81 kg (179 lb)

Playing career^{1}
Years	Club	Games (Goals)
1934	Essendon	2 (2)
- ^{1} Playing statistics correct to the end of 1934.

Henry Mervyn Storey (20 November 1913 – 13 July 1977) was an Australian rules footballer who played with Essendon in the Victorian Football League (VFL).
