= Joe Lovett =

Australian rules footballer, born 1902

Personal information
- Full name: Joe Lovett
- Born: 18 October 1902
- Died: 26 May 1949 (aged 46)
- Height: 180 cm (5 ft 11 in)
- Weight: 88 kg (194 lb)

Playing career^{1}
Years	Club	Games (Goals)
1926–28	North Melbourne	33 (27)
1932	Essendon	5 (0)
Total		38 (27)
- ^{1} Playing statistics correct to the end of 1932.

Joe Lovett (18 October 1902 – 26 May 1949) was an Australian rules footballer who played with North Melbourne and Essendon in the Victorian Football League (VFL).
