= Harry Neate =

Australian rules footballer

Personal information
- Full name: Herbert William Neate
- Born: 26 April 1894; Carlton, Victoria
- Died: 28 July 1956 (aged 62); Kew, Victoria
- Original team: Xavier College

Playing career^{1}
Years	Club	Games (Goals)
1914–15	Essendon	3 (0)
- ^{1} Playing statistics correct to the end of 1915.

Herbert William Neate (26 April 1894 – 28 July 1956) was an Australian rules footballer who played with Essendon in the Victorian Football League (VFL).
