= Bertie Wollacott =

Australian rules footballer

Personal information
- Full name: Bertie Edward Wollacott
- Born: 5 April 1890; South Yarra, Victoria
- Died: 4 September 1945 (aged 55); Parkville, Victoria
- Original team: Pakenham

Playing career^{1}
Years	Club	Games (Goals)
1911	Richmond	3 (3)
1918–21	Essendon	11 (7)
Total		14 (10)
- ^{1} Playing statistics correct to the end of 1921.

Bertie Edward Wollacott (5 April 1890 – 4 September 1945) was an Australian rules footballer who played with Richmond and Essendon in the Victorian Football League (VFL).

He later served on the Essendon Football Club committee as treasurer for several years.
