= Tom Wardley =

Australian rules footballer

Personal information
- Full name: Thomas Wardley
- Born: 5 September 1897; Rutherglen, Victoria
- Died: 13 February 1967 (aged 69); Heidelberg, Victoria
- Original team: Essendon Diggers

Playing career^{1}
Years	Club	Games (Goals)
1921	Essendon	14 (0)
- ^{1} Playing statistics correct to the end of 1921.

Thomas Wardley (5 September 1897 – 13 February 1967) was an Australian rules footballer who played with Essendon in the Victorian Football League (VFL).
