= Jack Cross (footballer) =

Australian rules footballer (1908–1967)

Personal information
- Full name: Jack Cross
- Born: 26 September 1908
- Died: 17 December 1967 (aged 59)
- Original team: Merbein

Playing career^{1}
Years	Club	Games (Goals)
1929	Essendon	1 (0)
- ^{1} Playing statistics correct to the end of 1929.

Jack Cross (26 September 1908 – 17 December 1967) was an Australian rules footballer who played with Essendon in the Victorian Football League (VFL).
