= Ken Forge =

Australian rules footballer

Personal information
- Full name: Ken M. Forge
- Born: 7 April 1942 (age 84)
- Original teams: Essendon Baptist-St John's, Melbourne Grammar
- Height: 189 cm (6 ft 2 in)
- Weight: 84 kg (185 lb)
- Position: Half-back

Playing career^{1}
| Years | Club | Games (Goals) |
| 1961–62 | Essendon | 15 (0) |
- ^{1} Playing statistics correct to the end of 1962.

Ken Forge (born 7 April 1942) is a former Australian rules footballer who played with Essendon in the Victorian Football League (VFL). He retired after injuring his knee and later played one match for Pharmacy College in the Victorian Amateur Football Association.
