= Mick Bates (Australian footballer) =

Australian rules footballer

Personal information
- Full name: Michael Bates
- Born: 26 June 1949 (age 77)
- Original team: Reservoir Old Boys
- Height: 196 cm (6 ft 5 in)
- Weight: 87 kg (192 lb)
- Position: Ruck

Playing career^{1}
Years	Club	Games (Goals)
1971	Essendon	2 (1)
- ^{1} Playing statistics correct to the end of 1971.

Mick Bates (born 26 June 1949) is a former Australian rules footballer who played with Essendon in the Victorian Football League (VFL).
