= James Lavelle (footballer) =

Australian rules footballer

Personal information
- Full name: James Patrick Lavelle
- Born: 18 January 1896; Coburg, Victoria
- Died: 16 July 1952 (aged 56); Coburg, Victoria

Playing career^{1}
Years	Club	Games (Goals)
1918	Essendon	1 (1)
- ^{1} Playing statistics correct to the end of 1918.

James Patrick Lavelle (18 January 1896 – 16 July 1952) was an Australian rules footballer who played with Essendon in the Victorian Football League (VFL).
