= Charlie Teather =

Australian rules footballer (1889–1948)

Personal information
- Full name: Charles Ernest Teather
- Born: 24 January 1889; Geelong, Victoria
- Died: 26 July 1948 (aged 59); St Kilda, Victoria
- Original team: Essendon Juniors

Playing career^{1}
Years	Club	Games (Goals)
1906–07, 1910	Essendon	20 (3)
- ^{1} Playing statistics correct to the end of 1910.

Charles Ernest Teather (24 January 1889 – 26 July 1948) was an Australian rules footballer who played with Essendon in the Victorian Football League (VFL).

== Family ==
The son of Benjamin Joseph Teather (1842–1929), and Jessie Agnes Teather (1855-1930), née Horne, Charles Ernest Teather was born in Geelong, Victoria on 24 January 1889.

He married Elsie May Barnott (1888-1966), later Mrs. Herbert Whiter, on 15 August 1914. They had one child: Jack Barnott Teather (1917-2010).

== Football ==
Many of the contemporaneous newspaper sporting reports have his family name as "Tether".

=== Essendon (VFL) ===
He played in 20 senior games for the Essendon Football Club in the VFL over three seasons (1906, 1907, and 1910). He made his debut for Essendon, against South Melbourne, at the East Melbourne Cricket Ground, on 5 May 1906, and played his last match against South Melbourne, at the Lake Oval, on 21 May 1910.

=== Essendon (VFA) ===
In June 1907 he played in two games with the Essendon Association Football Club in the VFA.

== Death ==
He died at his residence in St Kilda, Victoria on 26 July 1948.
