= Gilbert Wardley =

Australian rules footballer (1895–1971)

Personal information
- Full name: Gilbert Edward Wardley
- Born: 23 April 1895; Rutherglen, Victoria
- Died: 19 February 1971 (aged 75); Lambton, New South Wales

Playing career^{1}
Years	Club	Games (Goals)
1922	Essendon	1 (0)
- ^{1} Playing statistics correct to the end of 1922.

Gilbert Edward Wardley (23 April 1895 – 19 February 1971) was an Australian rules footballer who played with Essendon in the Victorian Football League (VFL).

== Family ==
The son of Edward Wardley (1859–1926), and Jane Hutton Logan Wardley (1863–1932), née Clouston, Gilbert Edward Wardley was born at Rutherglen, Victoria on 23 April 1895.

== Death ==
He died at Lambton, New South Wales on 19 February 1971.
