= Joe Marr =

Australian rules footballer

Personal information
- Full name: Joseph Thomas Marr
- Born: 9 August 1880; Richmond, Victoria, Australia
- Died: 19 July 1975 (aged 94); Liverpool, New South Wales, Australia
- Original team: Richmond City

Playing career^{1}
Years	Club	Games (Goals)
1900–02	Carlton	27 (6)
1903	Essendon	14 (1)
Total		41 (7)
- ^{1} Playing statistics correct to the end of 1903.

Joseph Thomas Marr (9 August 1880 – 19 July 1975) was an Australian rules footballer who played with Carlton and Essendon in the Victorian Football League (VFL).

== Family ==
The eldest of the 11 children of James Adam Marr (1859-1914), and Elizabeth May Marr (1864-1912), née Midolo, Joseph Thomas Marr was born at Richmond, Victoria on 9 August 1880.

Although the VFL records (perhaps retrospectively constructed) seem to follow those of the Carlton Football Club and the Essendon Football Club records have him as, simply, "J.T. Marr", given that:

(a) none of his 10 siblings were called "Thomas", the death notices for his mother and his father indicate that he was known to his family as "Thomas", rather than as "Joseph",
(b) at his marriage, on 19 August 1934, he was identified as "Thomas Joseph Marr",
(c) as early as 1934, his electoral roll entry was showing "Thomas Joseph Marr", and
(d) his death notice, and his gravestone, indicate that, although his birth was registered as "Joseph Thomas Marr", he was known as "Thomas Joseph Marr" — at least, in his later adult life.

He married Ruth McAndrew, née Heslin (1900-1981), in Marrickville, New South Wales, on 10 August 1934.

== Death ==
He died in a hospital at Liverpool, New South Wales on 19 July 1975.
