= Barney Jenkins =

Australian rules footballer

Personal information
- Full name: Barnett Hugh Jenkins
- Born: 7 March 1884; Stawell, Victoria
- Died: 14 June 1948 (aged 64); Melbourne, Victoria

Playing career^{1}
Years	Club	Games (Goals)
1907	Essendon	3 (2)
- ^{1} Playing statistics correct to the end of 1907.

Barnett Hugh Jenkins (7 March 1884 – 14 June 1948) was an Australian rules footballer who played for the Essendon Football Club in the Victorian Football League (VFL).

== Death ==
He died (suddenly) on 14 June 1948.
