= George McGorlick =

Australian rules footballer, born 1916

Personal information
- Full name: George McGorlick
- Born: 31 January 1916
- Died: 17 August 2007 (aged 91)
- Original team: Essendon CYMS (CYMSFA)
- Height: 174 cm (5 ft 9 in)
- Weight: 67 kg (148 lb)

Playing career^{1}
Years	Club	Games (Goals)
1935–37	Essendon	3 (2)
- ^{1} Playing statistics correct to the end of 1937.

George McGorlick (31 January 1916 – 17 August 2007) was an Australian rules footballer who played with Essendon in the Victorian Football League (VFL).
