= Otto Landmann =

Australian rules footballer (1888–1975)

Personal information
- Full name: Otto Bismarck Landmann
- Born: 31 August 1888; Warrnambool, Victoria
- Died: 7 November 1975 (aged 87); Richmond, Victoria
- Position: Full forward

Playing career^{1}
Years	Club	Games (Goals)
1907–10	Essendon (VFL)	27 (34)
1910	Melbourne (VFL)	2 (1)
1911	Brighton (VFA)	2 (0)
Total		31 (35)
- ^{1} Playing statistics correct to the end of 1911.

Otto Bismarck Landmann (31 August 1888 – 7 November 1975) was an Australian rules footballer who played with Essendon and Melbourne in the Victorian Football League (VFL), and with Brighton in the Victorian Football Association (VFA).

== Family ==
The son of Frank Landmann, and Sara Landmann, née Hetherington, Otto Bismarck Landmann was born in Warrnambool on 31 August 1888.

He married Mary Gertrude Thompson (1903-1984) in 1937.

== Football ==
=== Essendon (VFL) ===
Recruited from Warrnambool in 1907, he played 27 senior matches for Essendon, as full-forward, kicking a total of 34 goals, including seven of Essendon's eight goals in its 8.11 (59) to 6.9 (45) victory over South Melbourne on 13 June 1908.

He was selected in a representative VFL team that played against a combined Ballarat side, at the MCG on 8 June 1907. In a very one-sided match -- VFL 25.20 (170) to Ballarat 3.7 (25) -- he kicked three goals.

=== Melbourne (VFL) ===
Cleared from Essendon in 1910, he played two senior matches that season for Melbourne in the VFL.

=== Brighton (VFA) ===
In 1911 he was granted a clearance from Melbourne to play with Brighton in the VFA.

== Death ==
He died on 7 November 1975.
