= Alan Irwin =

Australian rules footballer

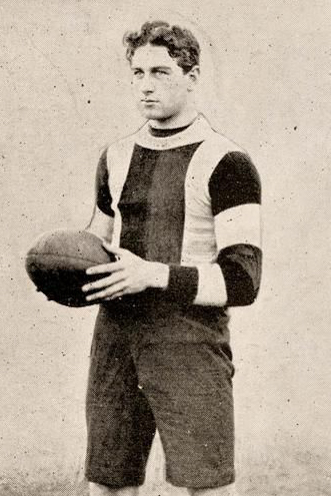
- Irwin in 1910

Personal information
- Full name: Alan Cavendish Irwin
- Born: 20 February 1889; Moonee Ponds, Victoria
- Died: 2 July 1970 (aged 81); Newtown, New South Wales

Playing career^{1}
Years	Club	Games (Goals)
1908–1909	Essendon	8 (2)
1910	St Kilda	2 (0)
Total		10 (2)
- ^{1} Playing statistics correct to the end of 1910.

Alan Cavendish Irwin (20 February 1889 – 2 July 1970) was an Australian rules footballer who played for the Essendon Football Club and St Kilda Football Club in the Victorian Football League (VFL).
