= Bob Walker (footballer, born 1891) =

Australian rules footballer

Personal information
- Full name: Robert Walker
- Born: 4 July 1891; Buln Buln, Victoria
- Died: 23 August 1965 (aged 74); Frankston, Victoria
- Original team: Footscray (VFA)
- Height: 180 cm (5 ft 11 in)
- Weight: 80 kg (176 lb)
- Position: Ruck

Playing career^{1}
Years	Club	Games (Goals)
1913–15, 1919–20	Essendon	51 (17)
- ^{1} Playing statistics correct to the end of 1920.

Robert Walker (4 July 1891 – 23 August 1965) was an Australian rules footballer who played with Essendon in the Victorian Football League (VFL).

== Family ==
The son of William John Walker, and Mary Jane Walker, née Spong, Robert Walker was born at Buln Buln, Victoria on 4 July 1891.

He married Ivy Gledhill on 3 November 1917.

== Death ==
He died at Frankston, Victoria on 23 August 1965.
