= Llew Jones (footballer) =

Australian rules footballer

Personal information
- Full name: Llewellyn James Jones
- Born: 31 May 1880; Port Melbourne, Victoria
- Died: 21 September 1952 (aged 72); South Melbourne, Victoria
- Original team: Royal Australian Artillery
- Height: 185 cm (6 ft 1 in)
- Weight: 83 kg (183 lb)

Playing career^{1}
Years	Club	Games (Goals)
1900	Essendon	5 (2)
- ^{1} Playing statistics correct to the end of 1900.

Llewellyn James Jones (31 May 1880 – 21 September 1952) was an Australian rules footballer who played with Essendon in the Victorian Football League (VFL).
