= Ron Kennedy (footballer) =

Australian rules footballer, born 1919

Personal information
- Full name: Ron Kennedy
- Born: 13 October 1919
- Died: 27 November 2006 (aged 87)
- Height: 169 cm (5 ft 7 in)
- Weight: 76 kg (168 lb)

Playing career^{1}
| Years | Club | Games (Goals) |
| 1944 | Essendon | 3 (1) |
- ^{1} Playing statistics correct to the end of 1944.

Ron Kennedy (13 October 1919 – 27 November 2006) was an Australian rules footballer who played with Essendon in the Victorian Football League (VFL).
