= Paul O'Brien (Australian footballer, born 1961) =

Australian rules footballer

Personal information
- Full name: Paul J. O'Brien
- Born: 16 April 1961 (age 65)
- Original team: St Peters
- Height: 177 cm (5 ft 10 in)
- Weight: 74.5 kg (164 lb)

Playing career^{1}
Years	Club	Games (Goals)
1980–1985	Melbourne	22 (0)
1986	North Melbourne	0 (0)
1988	Essendon	3 (2)
Total		25 (2)
- ^{1} Playing statistics correct to the end of 1988.

Paul J. O'Brien (born 16 April 1961) is a former Australian rules footballer who played with Melbourne and Essendon in the Victorian Football League (VFL).
