= Syd Sutherland =

Australian rules footballer

Personal information
- Full name: Donald Sydney Sutherland
- Born: 20 April 1890; Marrickville, New South Wales
- Died: 17 November 1957 (aged 67); Port Melbourne, Victoria
- Original team: Yarraville

Playing career^{1}
Years	Club	Games (Goals)
1919	Essendon	13 (3)
- ^{1} Playing statistics correct to the end of 1919.

Donald Sydney Sutherland (20 April 1890 – 17 November 1957) was an Australian rules footballer who played with Essendon in the Victorian Football League (VFL).

He later played with Hawthorn in the Victorian Football Association.
