= Ben Kavanagh (Australian footballer) =

Australian rules footballer, born 1905

Personal information
- Full name: Bernard Joseph Kavanagh
- Born: 14 February 1905; North Melbourne, Victoria
- Died: 1 September 1978 (aged 73); Fitzroy, Victoria

Playing career^{1}
Years	Club	Games (Goals)
1927	Essendon	2 (2)
1928–1929	North Melbourne	22 (35)
Total		24 (37)
- ^{1} Playing statistics correct to the end of 1929.

Bernard Joseph "Ben" Kavanagh (14 February 1905 – 1 September 1978) was an Australian rules footballer who played for the Essendon Football Club and North Melbourne Football Club in the Victorian Football League (VFL).
