= Frank Hunting =

Australian rules footballer, born 1910

Personal information
- Full name: Francis Cyril Hunting
- Born: 8 March 1910
- Died: 22 December 1999 (aged 89); Morphett Vale, South Australia

Playing career^{1}
Years	Club	Games (Goals)
1933	Essendon	4 (0)
- ^{1} Playing statistics correct to the end of 1933.

Francis Cyril Hunting (8 March 1910 – 22 December 1999) was an Australian rules footballer who played with Essendon in the Victorian Football League (VFL).
