= Edgar Masters (footballer) =

Australian rules footballer

Personal information
- Full name: Edgar Masters
- Born: 15 October 1888; North Melbourne, Victoria
- Died: 11 August 1974 (aged 85); Geelong, Victoria

Playing career^{1}
Years	Club	Games (Goals)
1911	Essendon	1 (0)
- ^{1} Playing statistics correct to the end of 1911.

Edgar Masters MC (15 October 1888 – 11 August 1974) was an Australian rules footballer who played with Essendon in the Victorian Football League (VFL).
