= Ken Mansfield (footballer) =

Australian rules footballer

Personal information
- Full name: Ken Mansfield
- Born: 7 September 1958 (age 68)
- Original team: Avondale Heights
- Height: 176 cm (5 ft 9 in)
- Weight: 79 kg (174 lb)
- Position: Rover

Playing career^{1}
Years	Club	Games (Goals)
1976–80	Essendon	48 (34)
- ^{1} Playing statistics correct to the end of 1980.

Ken Mansfield (born 7 September 1958) is a former Australian rules footballer who played with Essendon in the Victorian Football League (VFL). He won Essendon's most improved player award in 1979. Mansfield later played for Woodville in the South Australian National Football League (SANFL) and Victorian Football Association (VFA) sides Sandringham and Coburg.
