= Arnold Maltby =

Australian rules footballer, born 1913

Personal information
- Full name: Arnold Herbert Maltby
- Born: 1 August 1913; Port Melbourne, Victoria
- Died: 25 August 2003 (aged 90)
- Original team: Port Melbourne
- Height: 178 cm (5 ft 10 in)
- Weight: 77 kg (170 lb)

Playing career^{1}
Years	Club	Games (Goals)
1932–1936	Port Melbourne (VFA)	46 (23)
1936–1938	Essendon	34 (15)
1939	North Melbourne	2 (0)
- ^{1} Playing statistics correct to the end of 1939.

Arnold Herbert Maltby (1 August 1913 – 25 August 2003) was an Australian rules footballer who played for the Essendon Football Club and North Melbourne Football Club in the Victorian Football League (VFL).

He later served in the Australian Army during World War II.
