= Russell Muir =

Australian rules footballer

Personal information
- Full name: Russell Muir
- Born: 12 July 1954 (age 72)
- Original team: Strathmore
- Height: 180 cm (5 ft 11 in)
- Weight: 75 kg (165 lb)

Playing career^{1}
Years	Club	Games (Goals)
1972–75	North Melbourne	40 (6)
1977–81	Essendon	67 (3)
Total		107 (9)
- ^{1} Playing statistics correct to the end of 1981.

Russell Muir (born 12 July 1954) is a former Australian rules footballer who played with North Melbourne and Essendon in the Victorian Football League (VFL).
