= Alf Swift =

Australian rules footballer

Personal information
- Full name: Alfred Thomas Swift
- Born: 5 August 1871; Port Elliot, South Australia
- Died: 8 May 1953 (aged 81); Parkville, Victoria
- Original team: South Adelaide

Playing career^{1}
Years	Club	Games (Goals)
1904	Essendon	7 (2)
- ^{1} Playing statistics correct to the end of 1904.

Alfred Thomas Swift (5 August 1871 – 8 May 1953) was an Australian rules footballer who played for the Essendon Football Club in the Victorian Football League (VFL).

In 1912 he was found guilty of the manslaughter of his wife and sentenced to eight years in jail.
