= Colin Braid =

Australian rules footballer

Personal information
- Full name: Colin Walter Braid
- Born: 23 November 1913
- Died: 15 June 1938 (aged 24)
- Original team: South Broken Hill
- Height / weight: 183/84

Playing career^{1}
Years	Club	Games (Goals)
1934	Essendon	1 (0)
- ^{1} Playing statistics correct to the end of 1934.

Colin Walter Braid (23 November 1913 – 15 June 1938) was an Australian rules footballer who played with Essendon in the Victorian Football League (VFL). Braid died aged 24, from head injuries sustained when he fell while working in a Broken Hill mine.
