= Rupert Cooper =

Australian rules footballer

Personal information
- Full name: Rupert Frederick Cooper
- Born: 10 July 1886; Geelong, Victoria
- Died: 14 March 1957 (aged 70); Croydon, Victoria
- Original team: Romsey

Playing career^{1}
Years	Club	Games (Goals)
1909	Essendon	1 (0)
- ^{1} Playing statistics correct to the end of 1909.

Rupert Frederick Cooper (10 July 1886 – 14 March 1957) was an Australian rules footballer who played with Essendon in the Victorian Football League (VFL).
