= Bill Speakman (footballer) =

Australian rules footballer (1904–1960)

Personal information
- Full name: Bill Speakman
- Born: 16 November 1904
- Died: 2 May 1960 (aged 55)
- Original team: Coburg
- Height: 157 cm (5 ft 2 in)
- Weight: 62 kg (137 lb)

Playing career^{1}
Years	Club	Games (Goals)
1927–29	Essendon	16 (8)
- ^{1} Playing statistics correct to the end of 1929.

Bill Speakman (16 November 1904 – 2 May 1960) was an Australian rules footballer who played with Essendon in the Victorian Football League (VFL).
