= Eric Sprague =

Australian rules footballer

Personal information
- Full name: Eric Sprague
- Born: 18 September 1894
- Died: 13 September 1947 (aged 52)
- Position: Full Forward

Playing career^{1}
Years	Club	Games (Goals)
1918	Essendon	3 (0)
- ^{1} Playing statistics correct to the end of 1918.

Eric Sprague (18 September 1894 – 13 September 1947) was an Australian rules footballer who played with Essendon in the Victorian Football League (VFL).
