= Rob Newton (footballer) =

Australian rules footballer

Personal information
- Full name: Rob Newton
- Born: 17 April 1953 (age 73)
- Original team: Ringwood
- Height: 188 cm (6 ft 2 in)
- Weight: 84 kg (185 lb)

Playing career^{1}
Years	Club	Games (Goals)
1973–78	Essendon	59 (22)
- ^{1} Playing statistics correct to the end of 1978.

Rob Newton (born 17 April 1953) is a former Australian rules footballer who played with Essendon in the Victorian Football League (VFL).
