= Tommy Bell (Australian footballer) =

Australian rules footballer

Personal information
- Full name: Thomas Henry Bell
- Born: 21 March 1895; Footscray, Victoria
- Died: 16 April 1955 (aged 60); East Melbourne, Victoria
- Original team: North Melbourne (VFA)

Playing career^{1}
| Years | Club | Games (Goals) |
| 1921 | Essendon | 9 (0) |
- ^{1} Playing statistics correct to the end of 1921.

Thomas Henry Bell (21 March 1895 – 16 April 1955) was an Australian rules footballer who played with Essendon in the Victorian Football League (VFL).
