= Greg Flanegan =

Australian rules footballer

Personal information
- Full name: Greg Flanegan
- Born: 18 December 1958 (age 67)
- Original team: North Whyalla
- Height: 185 cm (6 ft 1 in)
- Weight: 91 kg (201 lb)

Playing career^{1}
Years	Club	Games (Goals)
1980	Essendon	2 (3)
- ^{1} Playing statistics correct to the end of 1980.

Greg Flanegan (born 18 December 1958) is a former Australian rules footballer who played with Essendon in the Victorian Football League (VFL).
