= Gordon Kearney =

Australian rules footballer

Personal information
- Full name: Gordon Brendan Kearney
- Born: 5 February 1885; Murchison, Victoria
- Died: 2 May 1957 (aged 72); Nagambie, Victoria
- Original team: Geelong College

Playing career^{1}
Years	Club	Games (Goals)
1903	Geelong	6 (0)
1907	Essendon	5 (0)
Total		11 (0)
- ^{1} Playing statistics correct to the end of 1907.

Gordon Brendan Kearney (5 February 1885 – 2 May 1957) was an Australian rules footballer who played with Geelong and Essendon in the Victorian Football League (VFL).
