= Bob Shearer (footballer) =

Australian rules footballer

Personal information
- Full name: Robert Nicol Shearer
- Born: 29 October 1892; Footscray, Victoria
- Died: 15 December 1957 (aged 65); Heidelberg, Victoria
- Original team: Yarraville Juniors

Playing career^{1}
Years	Club	Games (Goals)
1915	Essendon	3 (1)
- ^{1} Playing statistics correct to the end of 1915.

Robert Nicol Shearer (29 October 1892 – 15 December 1957) was an Australian rules footballer who played with Essendon in the Victorian Football League (VFL).
