= Tommy Wade (Australian footballer) =

Australian rules footballer

Personal information
- Full name: Thomas Hugh Wade
- Born: 2 March 1894; Scarsdale, Victoria
- Died: 27 November 1939 (aged 45); Kew, Victoria
- Original team: Hawthorn (VFA)

Playing career^{1}
Years	Club	Games (Goals)
1914–15, 1919	Essendon	23 (4)
- ^{1} Playing statistics correct to the end of 1919.

Thomas Hugh Wade (2 March 1894 – 27 November 1939) was an Australian rules footballer who played with Essendon in the Victorian Football League (VFL).
