= Syd Hall (footballer, born 1879) =

Australian rules footballer

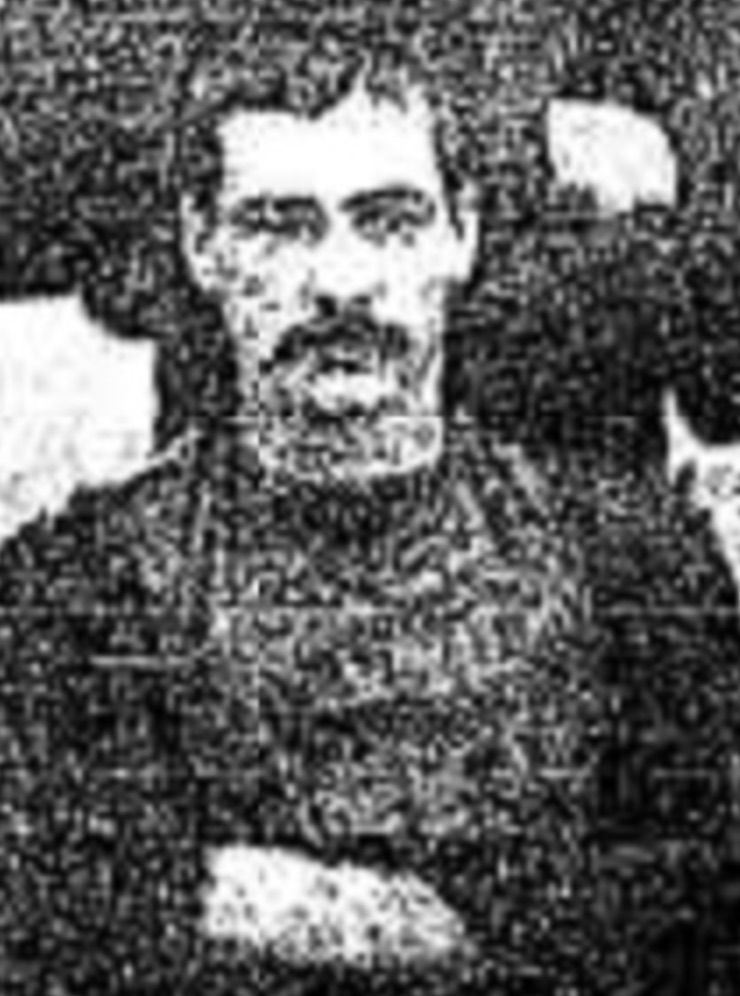
- Hall in July 1908

Personal information
- Full name: Sydney Hall
- Born: 30 March 1879; Bendigo, Victoria
- Died: 29 June 1946 (aged 67); Heidelberg, Victoria
- Original team: Preston

Playing career^{1}
Years	Club	Games (Goals)
1902	Essendon	8 (1)
- ^{1} Playing statistics correct to the end of 1902.

Sydney Hall (30 March 1879 – 29 June 1946), sometimes spelt Sid Hall, was an Australian rules footballer who played with Essendon in the Victorian Football League (VFL).

Hall, whom Essendon acquired from Preston, appeared in eight of the first nine rounds in the 1902 VFL season.
