= Jack Megson =

Australian rules footballer

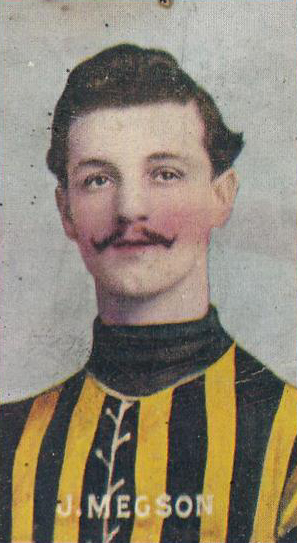
- Cigarette card on Megson in 1908

Personal information
- Full name: Joseph Verner Alexander Megson
- Born: 20 April 1883; Collingwood, Victoria
- Died: 14 July 1964 (aged 81); Sandringham, Victoria
- Original team: Collingwood Juniors

Playing career^{1}
Years	Club	Games (Goals)
1905	Essendon	1 (0)
1908–09	Richmond	20 (3)
Total		21 (3)
- ^{1} Playing statistics correct to the end of 1909.

Joseph Verner Alexander Megson (20 April 1883 – 14 July 1964) was an Australian rules footballer who played with Essendon and Richmond in the Victorian Football League (VFL).
