= Ray Ross (footballer, born 1900) =

Australian rules footballer

Personal information
- Full name: Raymond Paul Ross
- Born: 2 May 1900; Hotham West
- Original team: St Pauls Ascot Vale
- Height: 177 cm (5 ft 10 in)
- Weight: 72 kg (159 lb)

Playing career^{1}
| Years | Club | Games (Goals) |
| 1921 | Essendon | 8 (7) |
- ^{1} Playing statistics correct to the end of 1921.

Ray Ross (born 2 May 1900, date of death unknown) was an Australian rules footballer who played with Essendon in the Victorian Football League (VFL).

== Football ==
=== Essendon (VFL) ===
Identified as "an Essendon junior", Ross played his first game for Essendon against Fitzroy, at the Brunswick Street Oval, on 25 June 1921. Playing on the half-forward flank, he kicked two goals, and it was noted that he "made a very good first appearance".

In his last senior game for Essendon, against Fitzroy, at the East Melbourne Cricket Ground, on 10 September 1921, he scored a goal. The match, which finished with a draw – Essendom 10.14 (74) to Fitzroy 11.8 (74) – was Essendon's last game at the East Melbourne Cricket Ground. Despite being considered one of Essendon's best players, Ross was not selected for the last match of the 1921 season, and he did not play VFL senior football ever again.

== Family ==
The son of Mary Alice Ross, Raymond Paul Ross was born at Hotham West on 2 May 1900.
