= Jim McLear =

Australian rules footballer

Personal information
- Full name: James Laurence McLear
- Born: 21 December 1896; Dromana, Victoria
- Died: 26 November 1968 (aged 71); Warrnambool, Victoria
- Height: 191 cm (6 ft 3 in)
- Weight: 84 kg (185 lb)

Playing career^{1}
Years	Club	Games (Goals)
1919	Essendon	1 (0)
- ^{1} Playing statistics correct to the end of 1919.

James Laurence McLear (21 December 1896 – 26 November 1968) was an Australian rules footballer who played with Essendon in the Victorian Football League (VFL).
