= Mick Morris (Australian footballer) =

Australian rules footballer

Personal information
- Full name: Michael Joseph Morris
- Born: 4 June 1882; Minyip, Victoria
- Died: 3 August 1959 (aged 77); Kew, Victoria

Playing career^{1}
Years	Club	Games (Goals)
1901	Essendon	1 (0)
- ^{1} Playing statistics correct to the end of 1901.

Mick Morris (4 June 1882 – 3 August 1959) was an Australian rules footballer who played with Essendon in the Victorian Football League (VFL).
