= Morton Diston =

Australian rules footballer

Personal information
- Full name: Morton K. Diston
- Born: 28 May 1936 (age 90)
- Original team: Mitcham
- Height: 185 cm (6 ft 1 in)
- Weight: 80 kg (176 lb)
- Position: Follower

Playing career^{1}
Years	Club	Games (Goals)
1955–56	Essendon	12 (2)
- ^{1} Playing statistics correct to the end of 1956.

Morton Diston (born 28 May 1936) is a former Australian rules footballer who played with Essendon in the Victorian Football League (VFL). He later returned to his original side, Mitcham, before spending a season with Box Hill in the Victorian Football Association (VFA).
