= Phil Furlong =

Australian rules footballer

Personal information
- Full name: Phillip Francis Murray Furlong
- Born: 18 February 1893; Carlton, Victoria
- Died: 27 November 1930 (aged 37); Prahran, Victoria
- Original team: Carlton District
- Height: 171 cm (5 ft 7 in)
- Positions: Wingman, rover

Playing career^{1}
Years	Club	Games (Goals)
1918	Essendon	5 (3)
- ^{1} Playing statistics correct to the end of 1918.

Phillip Francis Murray Furlong (18 February 1893 – 27 November 1930) was an Australian rules footballer who played with Essendon in the Victorian Football League (VFL). He was cleared to Melbourne in 1920, but never played a senior VFL match for them.
