= Fred Coulsell =

Australian rules footballer, born 1905

Personal information
- Full name: Frederick Rowland Coulsell
- Born: 17 December 1905; Essendon, Victoria
- Original team: Sunshine
- Height: 188 cm (6 ft 2 in)
- Weight: 81 kg (179 lb)

Playing career^{1}
Years	Club	Games (Goals)
1927	North Melbourne	1 (0)
1931	Essendon	2 (2)
Total		3 (2)
- ^{1} Playing statistics correct to the end of 1931.

Frederick Rowland Coulsell (born 17 December 1905, date of death unknown) was an Australian rules footballer who played with North Melbourne and Essendon in the Victorian Football League (VFL).

== Family ==
The son of Frank Foster Coulsell (1872-1838), and Lydia Caroline Coulsell (1868-1926), née Van Damme, Frederick Rowland Coulsell was born at Essendon, Victoria on 17 December 1905.

He married Marjory Susan Griffiths (1901-1980) in 1937.
