= Vic McNeil =

Australian rules footballer

Personal information
- Full name: John Victor McNeil
- Born: 10 July 1890; West Melbourne, Victoria
- Died: 5 September 1936 (aged 46); Fitzroy, Victoria

Playing career^{1}
Years	Club	Games (Goals)
1913–14	Essendon	12 (1)
- ^{1} Playing statistics correct to the end of 1914.

John Victor McNeil (10 July 1890 – 5 September 1936) was an Australian rules footballer who played with Essendon in the Victorian Football League (VFL).

McNeil was recruited from Prahran during the 1913 season.
