= Lon Smith =

Australian rules footballer

Personal information
- Full name: Alonzo Thomas Fellow Smith
- Born: 10 June 1886; Melbourne, Victoria
- Died: 8 January 1959 (aged 72); Heidelberg, Victoria
- Original team: Preston District

Playing career^{1}
Years	Club	Games (Goals)
1908	Essendon	6 (1)
- ^{1} Playing statistics correct to the end of 1908.

Alonzo Thomas Fellow Smith (10 June 1886 – 8 January 1959) was an Australian rules footballer who played with Essendon in the Victorian Football League (VFL).
