= Allan Graco =

Australian rules footballer

Personal information
- Full name: Allan Russell Graco
- Born: 29 January 1948 (age 78)
- Original team: Doutta Stars
- Height: 183 cm (6 ft 0 in)
- Weight: 80 kg (176 lb)
- Positions: Ruckman, forward

Playing career^{1}
Years	Club	Games (Goals)
1971	Essendon	8 (2)
- ^{1} Playing statistics correct to the end of 1971.

Allan Russell Graco (born 29 January 1948) is a former Australian rules footballer who played for the Essendon Football Club in the Victorian Football League (VFL). He later played for North Melbourne's reserves and then Doutta Stars, the club he had been originally recruited to Essendon from.
