= Hedley Bryant =

Australian rules footballer

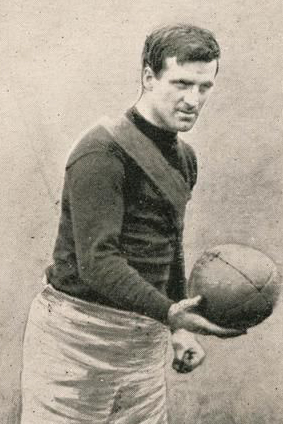
- Bryant in 1910

Personal information
- Full name: Hedley Venning Bryant
- Born: 23 November 1885; Ballarat, Victoria
- Died: 16 July 1968 (aged 82); Armadale, Victoria
- Original team: South Ballarat

Playing career^{1}
Years	Club	Games (Goals)
1910	Essendon	3 (2)
- ^{1} Playing statistics correct to the end of 1910.

Hedley Venning Bryant (23 November 1885 – 16 July 1968) was an Australian rules footballer who played with Essendon in the Victorian Football League (VFL).
