= Ned McSweeney =

Australian rules footballer (1903–1972)

Personal information
- Full name: Edward Francis McSweeney
- Born: 10 September 1903; North Melbourne, Victoria
- Died: 7 March 1972 (aged 68); Albury, New South Wales
- Height: 182 cm (6 ft 0 in)
- Weight: 76 kg (168 lb)

Playing career^{1}
Years	Club	Games (Goals)
1925–28	Essendon	37 (7)
- ^{1} Playing statistics correct to the end of 1928.

Edward Francis McSweeney (10 September 1903 – 7 March 1972) was an Australian rules footballer who played with Essendon in the Victorian Football League (VFL).
