= Ted Fay =

Australian rules footballer, born 1911

Personal information
- Full name: Ted Fay
- Born: 22 December 1911
- Died: 2 October 2001 (aged 89)
- Original team: West Coburg
- Height: 180 cm (5 ft 11 in)
- Weight: 76 kg (168 lb)
- Position: Fullback / Centre

Playing career^{1}
Years	Club	Games (Goals)
1932–34	Essendon	28 (1)
- ^{1} Playing statistics correct to the end of 1934.

Ted Fay (22 December 1911 – 2 October 2001) was an Australian rules footballer who played with Essendon in the Victorian Football League (VFL).
