= Norm Baker (footballer) =

Australian rules footballer

Personal information
- Full name: Norman Baker
- Born: 24 April 1917; Northcote, Victoria
- Died: 28 January 1979 (aged 61); Sandy Point, Victoria
- Original team: Northcote CYMS (CYMSFA)
- Height: 183 cm (6 ft 0 in)
- Weight: 79 kg (174 lb)
- Position: Back pocker / Halfback

Playing career^{1}
Years	Club	Games (Goals)
1937–41	Essendon	55 (0)
- ^{1} Playing statistics correct to the end of 1941.

Norman Baker (24 April 1917 – 28 January 1979) was an Australian rules footballer who played with Essendon in the Victorian Football League (VFL).

Baker's football career ended when he enlisted to serve in World War II.
