= Artie Bowe =

Australian rules footballer

Personal information
- Full name: Arthur James Bowe
- Born: 11 February 1888; Maldon, Victoria
- Died: 12 October 1949 (aged 61); Campsie, New South Wales
- Original team: Essendon (VFA)

Playing career^{1}
Years	Club	Games (Goals)
1909	Essendon	2 (0)
- ^{1} Playing statistics correct to the end of 1909.

Arthur James Bowe (11 February 1888 – 12 October 1949) was an Australian rules footballer who played for the Essendon Football Club in the Victorian Football League (VFL).
