= Phillip Early =

Australian rules footballer

Personal information
- Full name: Phillip Early
- Born: 30 September 1959 (age 67)
- Original team: Strathmore
- Height: 188 cm (6 ft 2 in)
- Weight: 85 kg (187 lb)

Playing career^{1}
Years	Club	Games (Goals)
1977	Essendon	10 (3)
1980	Fitzroy	3 (1)
Total		13 (4)
- ^{1} Playing statistics correct to the end of 1980.

Phillip Early (born 30 September 1959) is a former Australian rules footballer who played with Essendon and Fitzroy in the Victorian Football League (VFL).
