= Jack Godby =

Australian rules footballer

Personal information
- Full name: John Heitland Godby
- Born: 9 January 1880; Seymour, Victoria
- Died: 28 November 1928 (aged 48); Cheltenham, Victoria
- Original team: Melbourne Grammar

Playing career^{1}
Years	Club	Games (Goals)
1897	Melbourne	1 (0)
1903	Essendon	2 (0)
Total		3 (0)
- ^{1} Playing statistics correct to the end of 1803.

John Heitland Godby (9 January 1880 – 28 November 1928) was an Australian rules footballer who played with Melbourne and Essendon in the Victorian Football League (VFL).
