= Vic Papp =

Australian rules footballer

Personal information
- Full name: Victor John Papp
- Born: 31 May 1946 (age 80)
- Original team: Riverside Stars
- Height: 168 cm (5 ft 6 in)
- Weight: 67 kg (148 lb)
- Position: Wingman

Playing career^{1}
Years	Club	Games (Goals)
1968	Essendon	1 (0)
- ^{1} Playing statistics correct to the end of 1968.

Victor John Papp (born 31 May 1946) is a former Australian rules footballer who played with Essendon in the Victorian Football League (VFL). Papp later played for Essendon High School Old Boys, his old side Riverside Stars and was captain-coach of Gladstone Park.
