= Bob Annesley =

Australian rules footballer

Personal information
- Full name: Robert Devon Annesley
- Born: 10 July 1919
- Died: 3 February 2003 (aged 83)
- Original team: Midland Workshops
- Height: 173 cm (5 ft 8 in)
- Weight: 67 kg (148 lb)
- Position: Rover

Playing career^{1}
Years	Club	Games (Goals)
1939–41, 1946–47	Swan Districts	64 (63)
1945	Essendon	6 (7)
- ^{1} Playing statistics correct to the end of 1945.

Robert Devon Annesley (10 July 1919 – 3 February 2003) was an Australian rules footballer who played with Essendon in the Victorian Football League (VFL) during World War II. He spent most of his playing career with Swan Districts in the West Australian Football League (WAFL). Annesley was later captain-coach of local side, Scarborough, where he won six consecutive premierships in the 1960s.
