= Alby Sykes =

Australian rules footballer

Personal information
- Full name: Albert Stanley Sykes
- Born: 17 February 1883; North Melbourne, Victoria
- Died: 9 July 1954 (aged 71); Beaconsfield, Victoria
- Original team: North Melbourne Juniors

Playing career^{1}
| Years | Club | Games (Goals) |
| 1907 | Essendon | 4 (1) |
- ^{1} Playing statistics correct to the end of 1907.

Albert Stanley Sykes (17 February 1883 – 9 July 1954) was an Australian rules footballer who played for the Essendon Football Club in the Victorian Football League (VFL).
