= Lloyd Bertram =

Australian rules footballer (1903–1971)

Personal information
- Full name: Lloyd Bertram
- Born: 10 October 1903
- Died: 12 April 1971 (aged 67)
- Original team: Maribyrnong
- Height: 175 cm (5 ft 9 in)
- Weight: 83 kg (183 lb)

Playing career^{1}
Years	Club	Games (Goals)
1928, 1930	Essendon	8 (10)
- ^{1} Playing statistics correct to the end of 1930.

Lloyd Bertram (10 October 1903 – 12 April 1971) was an Australian rules footballer who played with Essendon in the Victorian Football League (VFL).
