= Jack Trehey =

Australian rules footballer

Personal information
- Full name: John Thomas Trehey
- Born: 28 May 1882; Carlton, Victoria
- Died: 5 December 1943 (aged 61); Melbourne, Victoria
- Original team: Northcote Juniors

Playing career^{1}
Years	Club	Games (Goals)
1902	Fitzroy	1 (0)
1903	Essendon	6 (1)
Total		7 (1)
- ^{1} Playing statistics correct to the end of 1903.

Jack Trehey (28 May 1882 – 5 December 1943) was an Australian rules footballer who played with Fitzroy and Essendon in the Victorian Football League (VFL).
