= Geoff Burdett =

Australian rules footballer

Personal information
- Full name: Geoff K. Burdett
- Born: 4 July 1956 (age 70)
- Original team: Hopetoun
- Height: 174 cm (5 ft 9 in)
- Weight: 76 kg (168 lb)
- Position: Utility

Playing career^{1}
Years	Club	Games (Goals)
1976–78, 1981	Essendon	37 (46)
- ^{1} Playing statistics correct to the end of 1981.

Geoff Burdett (born 4 July 1956) is a former Australian rules footballer who played with Essendon in the Victorian Football League (VFL). He later returned to his home club of Hopetoun and also spent time playing with Warracknabeal and Birchip, all three of which he was captain-coach.
