= Max Nixon (Australian rules footballer) =

Australian rules footballer (1931–2019)

Personal information
- Full name: Maxwell John Nixon
- Nickname: Poss
- Born: 24 December 1931
- Died: 6 January 2019 (aged 87)
- Original team: Orbost
- Height: 183 cm (6 ft 0 in)
- Weight: 81 kg (179 lb)
- Position: Half-forward

Playing career^{1}
Years	Club	Games (Goals)
1956	Essendon	6 (1)
- ^{1} Playing statistics correct to the end of 1956.

Maxwell John Nixon (24 December 1931 – 6 January 2019) was an Australian rules footballer who played with Essendon in the Victorian Football League (VFL).

Nixon played six seasons for Gippsland Football League club Orbost from 1949 to 1955. He played many positions, but winning the Trood award as league best and fairest in 1953 playing in the centre. He spent the first half of the 1956 season with Essendon on match permits, and showed good form across six games, but returned home to his farming commitments in Orbost.
