= Kelvin Steel =

Australian rules footballer

Personal information
- Full name: Kelvin Steel
- Born: 7 June 1955 (age 71)
- Original team: Surrey Hills
- Height: 182 cm (6 ft 0 in)
- Weight: 75 kg (165 lb)

Playing career^{1}
Years	Club	Games (Goals)
1974–77	Hawthorn	19 (3)
1979	Essendon	6 (0)
Total		25 (3)
- ^{1} Playing statistics correct to the end of 1979.

Kelvin Steel (born 7 June 1955) is a former Australian rules footballer who played with Hawthorn and Essendon in the Victorian Football League (VFL).
