= Con Kennedy =

Australian rules footballer

Personal information
- Full name: Cornelius Maurice Kennedy
- Born: 10 June 1879; Tallarook, Victoria
- Died: 24 June 1950 (aged 71); Seymour, Victoria

Playing career^{1}
Years	Club	Games (Goals)
1906	Essendon	4 (0)
- ^{1} Playing statistics correct to the end of 1906.

Cornelius Maurice Kennedy (10 June 1879 – 24 June 1950) was an Australian rules footballer who played with Essendon in the Victorian Football League (VFL).
