= Athol Cerini =

Australian rules footballer (1907–1999)

Personal information
- Full name: Athol Cerini
- Born: 12 December 1907
- Died: 10 April 1999 (aged 91)
- Original team: Flemington Presbyterians

Playing career^{1}
Years	Club	Games (Goals)
1928	Essendon	2 (2)
- ^{1} Playing statistics correct to the end of 1928.

Athol Cerini (12 December 1907 – 10 April 1999) was an Australian rules footballer who played for the Essendon Football Club in the Victorian Football League (VFL).
