= Bill McVitty =

Australian rules footballer

Personal information
- Full name: William John McVitty
- Born: 25 December 1881; South Melbourne, Victoria
- Died: 6 September 1961 (aged 79); Kew, Victoria
- Height: 188 cm (6 ft 2 in)
- Weight: 81 kg (179 lb)

Playing career^{1}
Years	Club	Games (Goals)
1905, 1907	Essendon	9 (0)
- ^{1} Playing statistics correct to the end of 1907.

William John McVitty (25 December 1881 – 6 September 1961) was an Australian rules footballer who played with Essendon in the Victorian Football League (VFL).
