= Billy Harrison (Australian footballer) =

Australian rules footballer

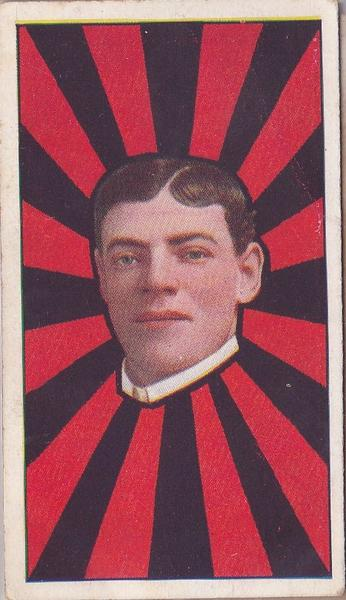
- Cigarette card of Harrison in 1911

Personal information
- Full name: William Harrison
- Born: 5 November 1883; Footscray, Victoria
- Died: 29 April 1949 (aged 65); Prince Henry's Hospital, St Kilda Road, Melbourne

Playing career^{1}
Years	Club	Games (Goals)
1909–11	Essendon	24 (6)
- ^{1} Playing statistics correct to the end of 1911.

William Harrison (5 November 1883 – 29 April 1949) was an Australian rules footballer who played with Essendon in the Victorian Football League (VFL).

== Family ==
The son of William Harrison (1852–1936), and Bliss Harrison (1854–1942), née Upstone, William Harrison was born on 5 November 1883.

== Death ==
He died at Prince Henry's Hospital, in St Kilda Road, Melbourne on 29 April 1949.
