= Sydney Barr =

Australian rules footballer

Personal information
- Full name: Sydney Charles Barr
- Born: 23 September 1892; Neerim South, Victoria
- Died: 12 February 1969 (aged 76); Heidelberg, Victoria
- Original team: Neerim

Playing career^{1}
Years	Club	Games (Goals)
1918	Essendon	1 (0)
- ^{1} Playing statistics correct to the end of 1918.

Sydney Charles Barr (23 September 1892 – 12 February 1969) was an Australian rules footballer who played with Essendon in the Victorian Football League (VFL).
