= Wally Edward =

Australian rules footballer

Personal information
- Full name: Walter George Phillip Edward
- Born: 6 April 1899; Queenscliff, Victoria
- Died: 21 January 1967 (aged 67); Essendon, Victoria
- Original team: Essendon Association
- Height: 180 cm (5 ft 11 in)
- Weight: 75 kg (165 lb)

Playing career^{1}
Years	Club	Games (Goals)
1926	Essendon	4 (0)
- ^{1} Playing statistics correct to the end of 1926.

Walter George Phillip Edward (6 April 1899 – 21 January 1967) was an Australian rules footballer who played with Essendon in the Victorian Football League (VFL).
