= Lindsay McGie =

Australian rules footballer

Personal information
- Full name: Lindsay William McGie
- Born: 30 March 1945 (age 81)
- Original team: Essendon Baptists-St John's
- Height: 188 cm (6 ft 2 in)
- Weight: 86 kg (190 lb)
- Positions: Follower, half-back

Playing career^{1}
Years	Club	Games (Goals)
1964–65, 1968–69	Essendon	31 (2)
1970–72	Port Adelaide	27
- ^{1} Playing statistics correct to the end of 1972.

Lindsay McGie (born 30 March 1945) is a former Australian rules footballer who played with Essendon in the Victorian Football League (VFL) and Port Adelaide in the South Australian National Football League (SANFL). A long-kicking left-footer, McGie was named Essendon's best first year player in 1964. He missed the 1966 and 1967 season due to serving in the Vietnam War. After two more seasons with Essendon, McGie moved to South Australia and played with Port Adelaide for three seasons. He later played for country South Australian club, Lyndoch, and then returned to Port as coach of the under-19s.
