= Bill French (footballer) =

Australian rules footballer

Personal information
- Full name: William Thomas Hunter French
- Born: 20 April 1884; Fitzroy, Victoria
- Died: 17 October 1972 (aged 88); Tweed Heads, New South Wales
- Original team: Alphington

Playing career^{1}
Years	Club	Games (Goals)
1908–09	Essendon	3 (0)
- ^{1} Playing statistics correct to the end of 1909.

William Thomas Hunter French (20 April 1884 – 17 October 1972) was an Australian rules footballer who played with Essendon in the Victorian Football League (VFL).

A carpenter by trade, French enlisted to serve in World War I in April 1915. The night after joining the 7th Battalion at Gallipoli, French suffered a crushed back and concussion in heavy fighting at Lone Pine and was returned to Australia three months later.
