= Les Irving =

Australian rules footballer, born 1904

Personal information
- Full name: Leslie Whittle Irving
- Born: 20 October 1904; Koroit, Victoria
- Died: 27 September 1973 (aged 68); Warrnambool, Victoria

Playing career^{1}
Years	Club	Games (Goals)
1927	Essendon	8 (0)
- ^{1} Playing statistics correct to the end of 1927.

Leslie Whittle Irving (20 October 1904 – 27 September 1973) was an Australian rules footballer who played with Essendon in the Victorian Football League (VFL).
