= Bert Numa =

Australian rules footballer

Personal information
- Full name: Herbert Numa
- Born: 14 July 1883; Carlton, Victoria
- Died: 14 June 1958 (aged 74); Parkville, Victoria

Playing career^{1}
Years	Club	Games (Goals)
1901–04	Essendon A (VFA)	26 (10)
1906	Essendon	1 (0)
- ^{1} Playing statistics correct to the end of 1906.

Bert Numa (14 July 1883 – 14 June 1958) was an Australian rules footballer who played for the Essendon Football Club in the Victorian Football League (VFL).
