= Neil King (footballer) =

Australian rules footballer

Personal information
- Full name: Neil McLachlan King
- Born: 7 July 1889; Footscray, Victoria
- Died: 14 July 1955 (aged 66); Melbourne, Victoria
- Original team: Ascot Vale
- Height: 175 cm (5 ft 9 in)

Playing career^{1}
Years	Club	Games (Goals)
1914–1915	Essendon	3 (0)
- ^{1} Playing statistics correct to the end of 1915.

Neil McLachlan King (7 July 1889 – 14 July 1955) was an Australian rules footballer for Essendon in the Victorian Football League (VFL).

== Football ==
King began his VFL career for Essendon in 1914. He played his final VFL match in 1915 having played three matches.
