= Michael Sheldon (footballer) =

Australian rules footballer

Personal information
- Full name: Michael Sheldon
- Born: 4 November 1960 (age 65)
- Original team: Horsham
- Height: 180 cm (5 ft 11 in)
- Weight: 77 kg (170 lb)

Playing career^{1}
Years	Club	Games (Goals)
1978–80	Essendon	11 (3)
- ^{1} Playing statistics correct to the end of 1980.

Michael Sheldon (born 4 November 1960) is a former Australian rules footballer who played with Essendon in the Victorian Football League (VFL).
