= Tom Hedley (footballer) =

Australian rules footballer

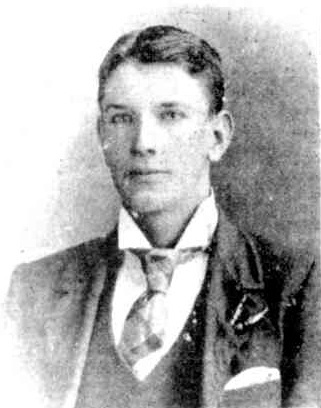
- Hedley in 1899

Personal information
- Full name: Thomas Monteith Hedley
- Born: 5 August 1882; Williamstown, Victoria
- Died: 11 June 1960 (aged 77); Williamstown, Victoria
- Original team: Williamstown
- Position: Ruck

Playing career^{1}
| Years | Club | Games (Goals) |
| 1903–04 | Essendon | 24 (6) |
- ^{1} Playing statistics correct to the end of 1904.

Thomas Monteith Hedley (5 August 1882 – 11 June 1960) was an Australian rules footballer who played with Essendon in the Victorian Football League (VFL).
