= Percy Watson (Australian footballer) =

Australian rules footballer

Personal information
- Full name: Percy Watson
- Born: 25 June 1898
- Died: 10 May 1965 (aged 66)
- Original team: Macedon

Playing career^{1}
Years	Club	Games (Goals)
1920	Essendon	1 (0)
- ^{1} Playing statistics correct to the end of 1920.

Percy Watson (25 June 1898 – 10 May 1965) was an Australian rules footballer who played with Essendon in the Victorian Football League (VFL).
