= 1912 VFL grand final =

Grand final of the 1912 Victorian Football League season

1912 VFL Grand Final

Essendon	South Melbourne
5.17 (47)	4.9 (33)
	1	2	3	4
ESS	1.4 (10)	3.9 (27)	4.14 (38)	5.17 (47)
SM	1.3 (9)	2.4 (16)	2.6 (18)	4.9 (33)
- Date: 28 September 1912
- Stadium: Melbourne Cricket Ground
- Attendance: 54,436

The 1912 VFL Grand Final was an Australian rules football game contested between the South Melbourne Football Club and Essendon Football Club, held at the Melbourne Cricket Ground in Melbourne on 28 September 1912. It was the 15th annual Grand Final of the Victorian Football League, staged to determine the premiers for the 1912 VFL season. The match, attended by 54,436 spectators, was won by Essendon by a margin of 14 points, marking that club's third premiership victory and second in succession.

== Teams ==
Essendon	S. Melbourne

Essendon
B:	Jack O'Brien	Billy Griffith	George McLeod
HB:	Les White	Dan Hanley	Len Bowe
C:	Wally Chalmers	Bill Sewart	Fred Kirkwood
HF:	Jack Kirby	Frank Caine	Paddy Shea
F:	Jim Martin	Lou Armstrong	Bill Walker
Foll:	Allan Belcher (c)	Fred Baring	Percy Ogden
Coach:	Jack Worrall		

South Melbourne
B:	Harry Saltau	Bob Deas	Bruce Sloss
HB:	Jack Scobie	William Thomas	Jack Walsh
C:	Joe Prince	Dick Mullaly	Jim Caldwell
HF:	Vic Belcher	Bert Franks	Fred Carpenter
F:	Dick Casey	Len Mortimer	Les Rusich
Foll:	Herbert Milne	Les Charge	Charlie Ricketts (c)
Coach:	Charlie Ricketts		

== Statistics ==
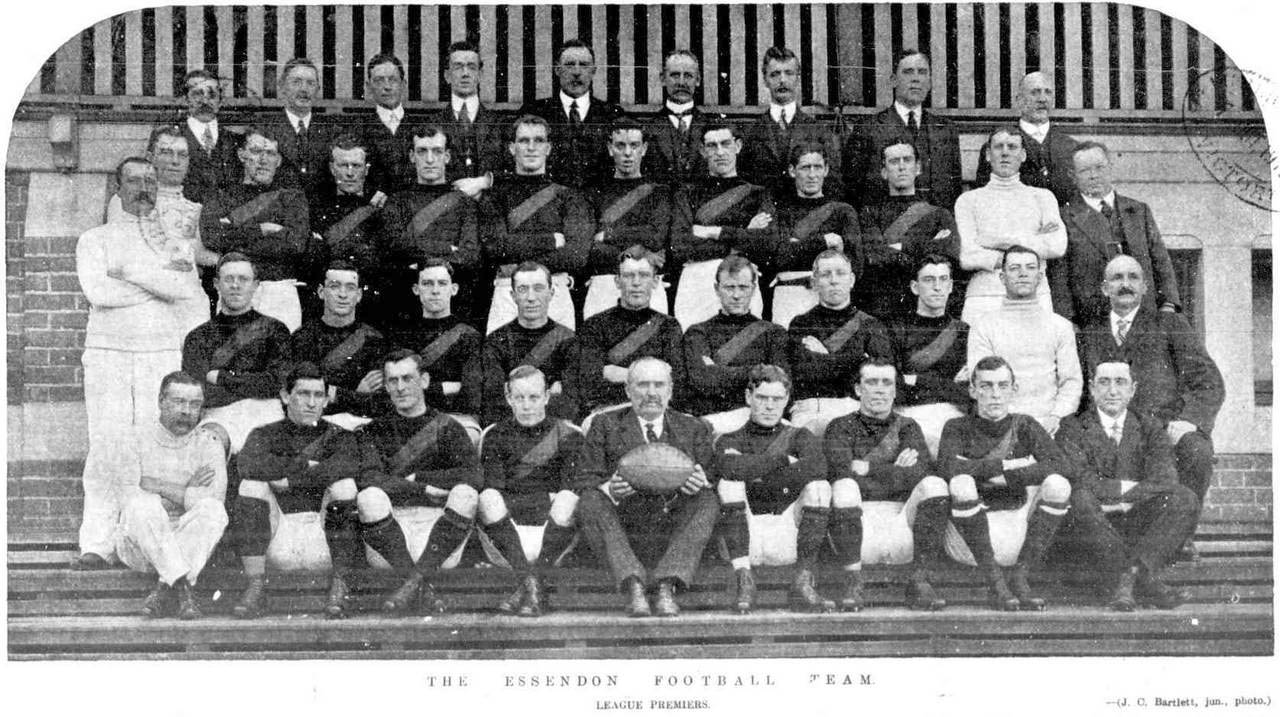
Essendon FC, Premiers

=== Goalkickers ===
Essendon:

- F Baring 1
- F Caine 1
- J Kirby 1
- P Ogden 1
- B Walker 1

South Melbourne:

- V Belcher 1
- D Casey 1
- B Franks 1
- L Rusich 1

== See also ==
- 1912 VFL season
