= 1911 VFL grand final =

Grand final of the 1911 Victorian Football League season

1911 VFL Grand Final

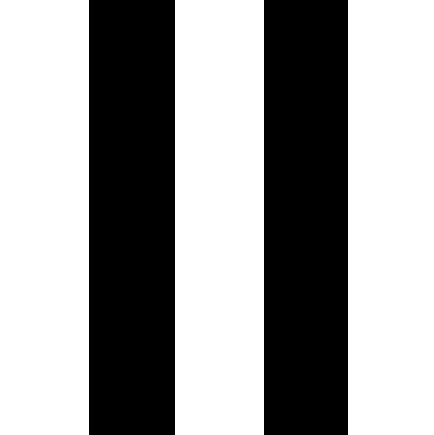
Essendon	Collingwood
5.11 (41)	4.11 (35)
	1	2	3	4
ESS	2.4 (16)	3.9 (27)	3.11 (29)	5.11 (41)
COLL	1.1 (7)	1.5 (11)	3.8 (26)	4.11 (35)
- Date: 23 September 1911
- Stadium: Melbourne Cricket Ground
- Attendance: 43,905
- Umpires: Jack Elder

The 1911 VFL Grand Final was an Australian rules football game contested between the Essendon Football Club and Collingwood Football Club, held at the Melbourne Cricket Ground in Melbourne on 23 September 1911. It was the 14th annual Grand Final of the Victorian Football League, staged to determine the premiers for the 1911 VFL season. The match, attended by 43,905 spectators, was won by Essendon by a margin of 6 points, marking that club's second premiership victory.

== Right to challenge ==
This season was played under the amended Argus system. Essendon was the minor premier, and Collingwood had finished fourth. The teams both qualified for this match by winning their semi-finals matches.

If Collingwood had won this match, Essendon would have had the right to challenge Collingwood to a rematch for the premiership on the following weekend, because Essendon was the minor premier. The winner of that match would then have won the premiership.

== Teams ==
Essendon	Collingwood

Essendon
B:	Vernon Hazel	Billy Griffith	Dan Hanley
HB:	Dick Monteith	Bill Busbridge	Len Bowe
C:	Wally Chalmers	Bill Sewart	Fred O'Shea
HF:	Paddy Shea	Lou Armstrong	Percy Ogden
F:	Jack Kirby	Dave Smith (c)	Bill Walker
Foll:	Fred Baring	George McLeod	Ernie Cameron
Coach:	Jack Worrall		

Collingwood
B:	Eddie Thomas	Ted Rowell	Paddy Rowan
HB:	Jack Green	Jim Sharp	Duncan McIvor
C:	Jim Sadler	Jock McHale	Percy Gibb
HF:	George Anderson	Dan Minogue	Percy Wilson
F:	Paddy Gilchrist	Dick Lee (c)	Dick Vernon
Foll:	Les Hughes	Dave Ryan	Tom Baxter
Coach:	George Angus		

- Umpire – Jack Elder

== Statistics ==
=== Goalkickers ===
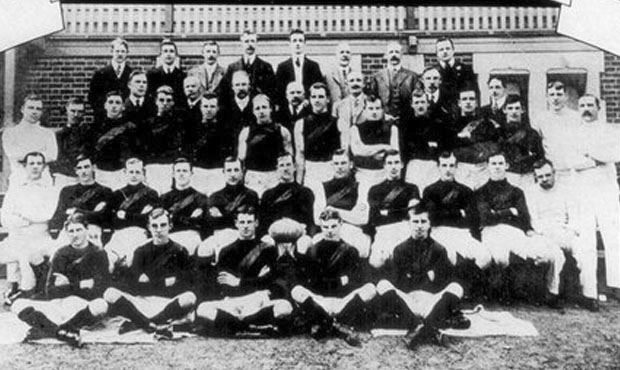
Essendon FC, Premier team

Essendon:

- F Baring 1
- J Kirby 1
- G McLeod 1
- P Shea 1
- B Walker 1

Collingwood:

- T Baxter 1
- D Lee 1
- D Minogue 1
- T Rowell 1

== See also ==
- 1911 VFL season
