= 1914 VFL grand final =

Grand final of the 1914 Victorian Football League season

1914 VFL Grand Final
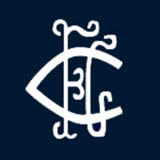

Carlton	South Melbourne
6.9 (45)	4.15 (39)
	1	2	3	4
CAR	2.3 (15)	5.8 (38)	5.8 (38)	6.9 (45)
SM	2.5 (17)	2.5 (17)	3.11 (29)	4.15 (39)
- Date: 26 September 1914
- Stadium: Melbourne Cricket Ground
- Attendance: 30,495
- Umpires: Harry Rawle

The 1914 VFL Grand Final was an Australian rules football game contested between the Carlton Football Club and South Melbourne Football Club, held at the Melbourne Cricket Ground in Melbourne on 26 September 1914. It was the 17th annual Grand Final of the Victorian Football League, staged to determine the premiers for the 1914 VFL season. The match, attended by 30,495 spectators, was won by Carlton by a margin of 6 points, marking that club's fourth premiership victory.

In a dramatic last minute, with South Melbourne trailing by six points, the ball was kicked into their forward 50. Ernie Jamieson of Carlton leaped into the back of South Melbourne player Tom Bollard at full-forward, to punch the ball away, but a free kick was not given, allowing the ball to be cleared to safety and give Carlton victory.

== Teams ==
Carlton	S. Melbourne

Carlton
B:	Paddy O'Brien	Ernie Jamieson	Andy McDonald
HB:	Steve Leehane	Billy Dick (c)	Harry Haughton
C:	Alf Baud	Rod McGregor	Ted Brown
HF:	Jack Lowe	Bill Cook	Percy Daykin
F:	Charlie Fisher	Gordon Green	Herb Burleigh
Foll:	George Calwell	Charlie Hammond	Jimmy Morris
Coach:	Norm Clark		

South Melbourne
B:	Harry Saltau	Bob Deas	Arthur Rademacher
HB:	Stan Hiskins	Harvey Kelly	Vic Belcher (c)
C:	Mark Tandy	Tom Bollard	Joe Prince
HF:	Bruce Sloss	Alan O'Donoghue	Les Rusich
F:	Dick Mullaly	Jack Freeman	Harry Morgan
Foll:	Les Charge	Ben Hair	Jim Caldwell
Coach:	Vic Belcher		

- Umpire – Harry Rawle

== Statistics ==
=== Goalkickers ===
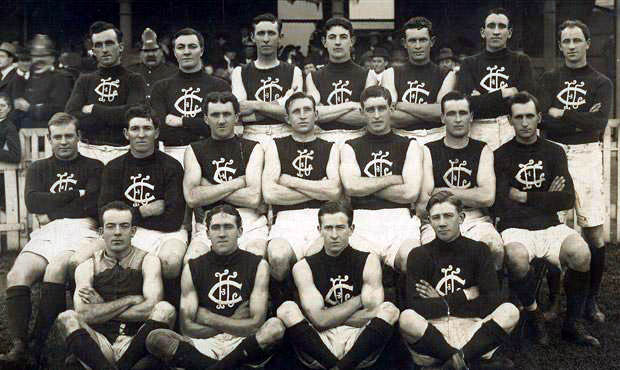
The Carlton team that won its 4th VFL premiership

Carlton:

- Brown 1
- Burleigh 1
- Cook 1
- Fisher 1
- Green 1
- Morris 1

South Melbourne:

- Charge 1
- Freeman 1
- Mullaly 1
- Sloss 1

=== Attendance ===
- MCG crowd – 30,495

== See also ==
- 1914 VFL season
