= Billy Griffith (footballer) =

Australian rules footballer

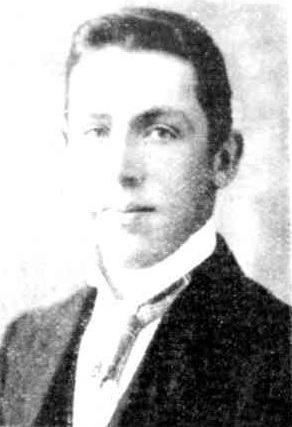
- Griffith in 1901

Personal information
- Full name: William Charles Griffith
- Born: 26 December 1880; Flemington, Victoria
- Died: 7 May 1949 (aged 68); Flemington, Victoria
- Original team: Essendon District
- Height: 175 cm (5 ft 9 in)
- Weight: 76 kg (168 lb)

Playing career^{1}
Years	Club	Games (Goals)
1899–1913	Essendon	187 (13)
- ^{1} Playing statistics correct to the end of 1913.

Career highlights
- 3× VFL premiership player: 1901, 1911, 1912; Essendon captain: 1907–1909; Essendon Team of the Century

William Charles Griffith (26 December 1880 – 7 May 1949) was an Australian rules footballer who played with Essendon in the Victorian Football League (VFL).

== Football ==
Griffith was a full back but was also used as a rover. He was a rover in Essendon's 1901 premiership side and a fullback in their 1911 and 1912 triumphs.

Griffith captained the club from 1907 until 1909 and twice represented Victoria in interstate football, in 1901 and 1902.

When he retired in 1913 Griffith held the record for most games by a Essendon player, until broken by Dick Reynolds in 1944.

=== Honour ===
In 1997 Griffith was named on the interchange bench in Essendon's official Team of the Century.
