= Wally Chalmers =

Australian rules footballer

Personal information
- Full name: Walter Henry Chalmers
- Born: 16 September 1890; Carlton, Victoria
- Died: 17 November 1966 (aged 76); Brighton, Victoria
- Original team: Carlton District
- Height: 163 cm (5 ft 4 in)
- Weight: 63 kg (139 lb)
- Position: Wing

Playing career^{1}
Years	Club	Games (Goals)
1911–1918	Essendon	73 (11)
- ^{1} Playing statistics correct to the end of 1918.

Career highlights
- Essendon premiership player 1911/1912

Walter Henry Chalmers (16 September 1890 – 17 November 1966) was an Australian rules footballer who played with Essendon in the Victorian Football League (VFL).

Recruited from Carlton District, Chalmers was a wingman and debuted for Essendon in the 1911 season. He played in that year's premiership side and in another premiership side the following year. His career was interrupted by the First World War but he returned to Essendon in 1918 for one final season.

== Personal life ==
Wally Chalmers was the second of three sons of prominent Australian stage actors George Chalmers (1854–1937) and Katie Towers (1870–1946). George Chalmers was the stage name of George Weeks and Chalmers was born Walter Henry Weeks in Carlton, Victoria on 16 September 1890. He married Harriet Stuart Schilling (1889–1961) in 1914.

== VFL career ==
Wally Chalmers came to Essendon from the Carlton seconds, and commenced his career in the Victorian Football League (VFL) in 1911. Under the captaincy of David Smith and coaching tenure of Jack Worrall, Chalmers played on the wing, and within the space of his first season, he came to be recognised as the best wingman in the entire league. Essendon finished the season as minor premiers and met Collingwood in the 1911 VFL Grand Final at the Melbourne Cricket Ground (MCG). Chalmers retained his position as a wingman for the game as Essendon defeated Collingwood by a goal, making Chalmers a premiership player in his first ever season at the senior level.

In 1911, Chalmers also represented the VFL in matches against sides from the Ballarat Football League and the Bendigo Football League.

In 1912, Chalmers, this time under the captaincy of Allan Belcher, became a dual premiership player when Essendon defeated South Melbourne in the 1912 VFL Grand Final. Chalmers had once more played a premiership on the wing. He continued his career at Essendon through to 1915, after which Essendon withdrew from the competition due to World War I. When the club re-entered the VFL in 1918, Chalmers continued playing for Essendon, switching his No. 7 guernsey for No. 2, although he would only play a further 6 games before his career at the senior level concluded.

== Statistics ==
Season	Team	No.	Games	Goals
1911	Essendon	7	19	2
1912	Essendon	7	16	1
1913	Essendon	7	16	1
1914	Essendon	7	15	6
1915	Essendon	7	1	0
1918	Essendon	2	6	1
Career totals			73	11
