= Dick Monteith =

Dick Monteith may refer to:

- Dick Monteith (politician) (born 1932), American politician from California
- Dick Monteith (footballer) (1887–1959), Australian rules footballer
