= Reg Gibb =

Australian rules footballer

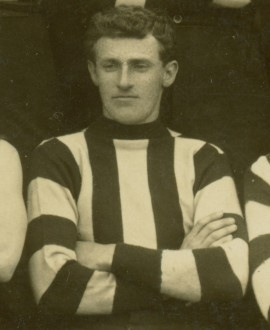
- Gibb in 1913

Personal information
- Full name: Reginald Norman Gibb
- Born: 10 November 1892; Hawthorn, Victoria
- Died: 15 July 1981 (aged 88)
- Original team: Hawthorn (VFA)
- Height: 178 cm (5 ft 10 in)
- Weight: 72 kg (159 lb)

Playing career^{1}
Years	Club	Games (Goals)
1913–1914	Collingwood	20 (6)
1915, 1919	Melbourne	11 (1)
Total		31 (7)
- ^{1} Playing statistics correct to the end of 1919.

Reginald Norman Gibb (10 November 1892 – 15 July 1981) was an Australian rules footballer who played with Collingwood and Melbourne in the Victorian Football League (VFL).

Gibb was the third of three brothers to play for Collingwood. He made appearances beside his eldest brother Percy in 1913 but missed out on playing with his other brother Len by a year.

Debuting in round two of the 1913 VFL season, Gibb became a regular member of the Collingwood team and played 17 games, including a semi final. His time at Collingwood came to an end in 1914 when he received a 15-game suspension for striking Essendon half back flanker Roy Laing.

When he returned to league football midway through the 1915 season, it was at a new club, Melbourne. He played eight games and then had to sit out of football for three years while Melbourne were in a war imposed recess. In 1919 he resumed his career but only made three appearances before getting a clearance back to his original club Hawthorn, who competed in the Victorian Football Association. His son Ray Gibb would later play for Hawthorn in the Victorian Football League.
