= Daniel Hanley =

Daniel Hanley may refer to:

- Daniel P. Hanley (born 1955), film editor
- Dan Hanley (footballer) (1883–1976), Australian rules footballer
