= Tom Bollard =

Australian rules footballer

Personal information
- Full name: Thomas Vincent Bollard
- Born: 16 October 1890; North Melbourne, Victoria
- Died: 18 March 1920 (aged 29); Melbourne, Victoria
- Original team: North Melbourne Juniors
- Height: 173 cm (5 ft 8 in)
- Weight: 66 kg (146 lb)

Playing career^{1}
Years	Club	Games (Goals)
1914–1917	South Melbourne	24 (0)
- ^{1} Playing statistics correct to the end of 1917.

Thomas Vincent Bollard (16 October 1890 – 18 March 1920) was an Australian rules footballer who played with South Melbourne in the Victorian Football League (VFL).

== Career ==
Bollard, a North Melbourne Junior, started at South Melbourne in the 1914 VFL season. He debuted in round 13 as a replacement for Dick Mullaly as South Melbourne's centreman and performed well enough that he kept that position when Mullaly returned. It was as a centreman that he lined up for South Melbourne in the 1914 VFL Grand Final against Carlton, before he got injured and was forced to play the rest of the game as a forward. In the final moments, with South Melbourne behind by six points, Jim Caldwell kicked the ball towards Bollard who looked set to take a mark in front of the goal posts, before Carlton's Ernie Jamieson took a game saving mark by springing onto the South Melbourne player's back. The marking contest was deemed by the umpire to have been fair, a view endorsed by the match report in The Australasian. Carlton held on to win by the one goal margin.

In 1915, Bollard made nine league appearances for South Melbourne, in a season which included a stint on the sidelines when he was found guilty of "slinging" Carlton player Ted Brown during South Melbourne's round 11 loss at Princes Park. He returned in round 18, the final round of the season.

After missing the entire 1916 VFL season, Bollard returned to the side midway through the 1917 season, by now playing as a defender. His final appearance for South Melbourne was that year's semi final loss to Collingwood.

== Death ==
Bollard died on 18 March 1920, aged 29, in an industrial accident at a skin store on Queen Street in West Melbourne. He had been crushed by a 342 lb bale, which was dropped from a second floor chute.
