= Tom Wright (Australian footballer) =

Australian rules footballer (1882–1916)

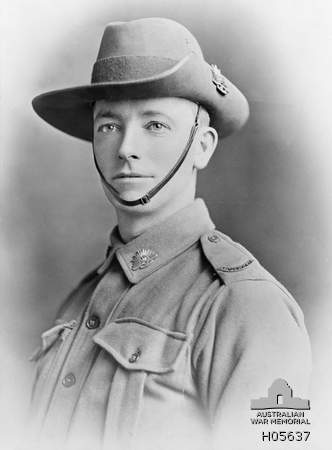

Personal information
- Full name: Thomas James Wright
- Born: 23 August 1882; Collingwood, Victoria
- Died: 12 December 1916 (aged 34); Le Transloy, France

Playing career^{1}
Years	Club	Games (Goals)
1906–07	Collingwood	12 (7)
- ^{1} Playing statistics correct to the end of 1907.

Thomas James Wright (23 August 1882 – 12 December 1916) was an Australian rules footballer who played with Collingwood in the Victorian Football League (VFL). He was killed in action on active service in France in World War I.

== History ==
He was captain of the New Zealand team that competed in the 1908 Melbourne Jubilee Australasian Football Carnival, and was one of that team's best players.

He finished his football career playing for the Victorian Football Association (VFA) club Prahran.

A slater and tiler by profession, he played his first senior game for Collingwood, against Essendon, at Victoria Park, on 4 August 1906 (at the time of his enlistment in the army in 1916 his height was measured at 5 ft 8½in, and his weight at 11½stone).

The report of his first match noted that "Wright, a district junior, gave satisfactory promise of future usefulness forward". He played another three matches that season, including Collingwood's losing semi-final against Carlton.

He played another eight senior games for Collingwood in 1907, including Collingwood's losing semi-final against South Melbourne.

After leaving the VFL, Wright went to New Zealand to work. He was appointed New Zealand's captain for the team that played in Jubilee Australasian Football Carnival, where New Zealand defeated both New South Wales and Queensland.

Wright finished his career in the VFA at Prahran, having been granted a permit to play for Prahran in April 1909. He was elected to the committee of the Collingwood Football Club, and continued to serve Collingwood well until he resigned upon his enlistment in the AIF.

Wright had served with the North Melbourne Garrison Artillery for three years (1904–1907); and he enlisted in the First AIF on 3 February 1915, serving first with the 7th Battalion AIF, and transferring to the 59th Battalion on 4 August 1916. A Corporal with the 59th Battalion—he was promoted to corporal on the field on 16 October 1916—Wright fought on the western front during World War I.

He was killed in action on 12 December 1916 and was buried at Delville Wood Cemetery in Longueval, France.

== See also ==
- List of Victorian Football League players who died on active service
- 1908 Melbourne Carnival
