= Bill A. Walker =

Australian rules footballer (1886–1934)

Bill Walker

Personal information
- Full name: William Armley Walker
- Born: 29 August 1886; Essendon, Victoria
- Died: 8 November 1934 (aged 48); Fitzroy, Victoria
- Original team: Collingwood Juniors
- Debut: Round 1, 1911, Essendon vs. Carlton, at East Melbourne
- Height: 183 cm (6 ft 0 in)
- Weight: 76 kg (168 lb)

Playing career^{1}
Years	Club	Games (Goals)
1911–1915	Essendon	66 (53)
- ^{1} Playing statistics correct to the end of 1915.

William Armley "Johnnie" Walker (29 August 1886 – 8 November 1934) was an Australian rules footballer who played for Essendon in the VFL.

== Family ==
The son of William Walker, and Susannah Walker (1843–1912), née Kidd, William Armley Walker was born in Essendon, Victoria on 29 August 1886.

He married Josephine Harnett (?–1941) in 1916. Josephine Harnett was the licensee of the Tankerville Arms Hotel, Nicholson Street, Fitzroy for twenty years.

== Football ==
=== Essendon (VFL) ===
Walker, also known by his nickname 'Johnnie', was recruited from the Collingwood Juniors.

A ruckman, he made his senior VFL debut in 1911 and was a member of Essendon's 1911 and 1912 premiership teams. Walker's 14 goals in 1915 was enough to top Essendon's goal-kicking. Although selected to represent the VFL in a match against a combined Bendigo Football League team, played in Bendigo on 3 July 1912, he did not play in the game.

Although he missed the team's first match, against Collingwood, he played in the remaining eleven matches of the (truncated due to World War I) 1915 season.

Essendon did not compete in the VFL in 1916 and 1917. Walker did not resume his career in 1918, when Essendon re-entered the competition.

=== VFL Tribunal (30 July 1913) ===
In July 1913 Walker, who played in a long-sleeved guernsey, was reported by both Dan Feehan, the match steward, and Jack Elder, the central umpire, for striking (ex-Essendon) Fitzroy's Jim Martin with his elbow during the 26 July 1913 match against Fitzroy.

In the evidence given to the tribunal it was established that Mertin had, indeed, been elbowed by somebody; and that the perpetrator had been wearing a short-sleeve guernsey. Martin gave evidence that it was not Walker who had struck him, but it was Jack Woolley. Jack Woolley also appeared before the tribunal, stating that he had worn a short-sleeved guernsey, and that it was he, rather than Walker, who had had struck Martin with his elbow. The charge against Walker was dismissed.

== Death ==
He died at Fitzroy, Victoria on 8 November 1934.

== See also ==
- 1911 VFL Grand Final
- 1912 VFL Grand Final
