= Frank Dunne (footballer) =

Australian rules footballer

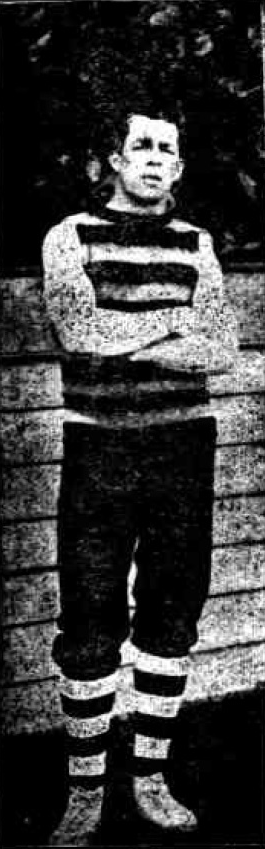

Personal information
- Full name: Francis Charlton Dunne
- Nickname: Diver
- Born: 13 August 1875; Kilmore, Victoria
- Died: 16 February 1937 (aged 61); Forestville, South Australia
- Original teams: Albury, St Kilda
- Position: Ruck

Playing career^{1}
Years	Club	Games (Goals)
1905	St Kilda	1 (1)
1906–1908	South Fremantle	44 (10)
1909–1913	Sturt	54 (27)
- ^{1} Playing statistics correct to the end of 1913.

Career highlights
- Representative for: Western Australia 1908; South Australia 1911

Francis Charlton "Diver" Dunne (13 August 1875 – 16 February 1937) was an Australian rules footballer who played with St Kilda in the Victorian Football League (VFL), South Fremantle in the West Australian Football Association (WAFA) and Sturt in the South Australian Football League (SAFL).

== Family ==
The son of William Dunne (1833–1889), and Annie Theresa Dunne (1837–1896), née Murphy, Francis Charlton Dunne was born in Kilmore, Victoria on 13 August 1875.

He married Matilda Bridget Fensling (1877–1960) in Albury in 1902.

== Football ==
Dunne was recruited to St. Kilda from Albury in the Ovens and Murray Football League.

During his time at South Fremantle and Sturt he was considered one of the best "ruck shepherds" in the game, and represented Western Australia at the 1908 Melbourne Carnival and South Australia at the 1911 Adelaide Carnival.

== Death ==
He died at Forestville, South Australia on 16 February 1937.

== See also ==
- 1908 Melbourne Carnival
- 1911 Adelaide Carnival
