= Les Rusich =

Australian rules footballer

Personal information
- Full name: Leslie John Rusich
- Born: 9 May 1889; South Melbourne, Victoria
- Died: 22 November 1953 (aged 64); Albert Park
- Original team: Leopold
- Height: 175 cm (5 ft 9 in)
- Weight: 69 kg (152 lb)

Playing career^{1}
Years	Club	Games (Goals)
1912–1915	South Melbourne	54 (33)
- ^{1} Playing statistics correct to the end of 1915.

Leslie John "Les" Rusich (9 May 1889 – 22 November 1953) was an Australian rules footballer who played with South Melbourne in the Victorian Football League (VFL).

Rusich, who was of Austrian descent, played his football as a forward. He was in a pocket for South Melbourne in the 1912 VFL Grand Final and kicked the first goal, but finished on the losing team. Rusich also appeared in South Melbourne's 1914 Grand Final loss, as a flanker.
