= Percy Gibb =

Australian rules footballer (1881–1940)

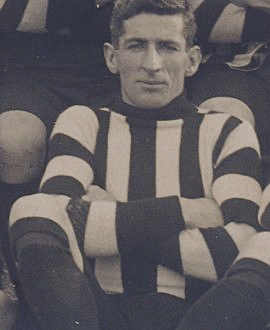
- Gibb in 1942

Personal information
- Full name: Percy Henry Gibb
- Born: 6 December 1881; Woollahra, New South Wales
- Died: 2 November 1940 (aged 58); Heidelberg, Victoria
- Original team: Richmond (VFA)
- Height: 178 cm (5 ft 10 in)
- Weight: 72 kg (159 lb)
- Position: Wingman

Playing career^{1}
Years	Club	Games (Goals)
1905–14	Collingwood	157 (9)
- ^{1} Playing statistics correct to the end of 1914.

Percy Henry Gibb (6 December 1881 – 2 November 1940) was an Australian rules footballer who played with Collingwood in the Victorian Football League (VFL).

Gibb played most of his football as a wingman and started his career at Richmond, who at that stage were participating in the VFA. He transferred to Collingwood in 1905 and was member of their 1910 premiership team as well as being a losing Grand Finalist in 1905 and 1911. A Victorian interstate football representative, Gibb retired in 1914 but remained at Collingwood as a committeeman.

He was the brother of Len Gibb and Reg Gibb. His nephew Ray Gibb also played in the VFL.
