= Bill Luff Sr. =

Australian rules footballer (1886–1952)

Bill Luff
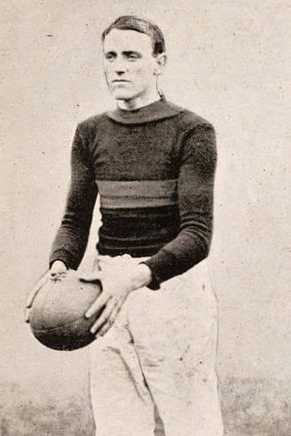
- Luff in 1910

Personal information
- Full name: William John Luff
- Born: 15 January 1886; Hawthorn, Victoria
- Died: 6 September 1952 (aged 66); Blackburn, Victoria
- Original team: Richmond Imperials
- Height: 191 cm (6 ft 3 in)
- Weight: 73 kg (161 lb)

Playing career^{1}
| Years | Club | Games (Goals) |
| 1908–10 | Richmond | 39 (0) |
- ^{1} Playing statistics correct to the end of 1910.

William John Luff (15 January 1886 – 6 September 1952) was an Australian rules footballer who played with the Richmond in the Victorian Football League (VFL).

== Family ==
The son of Richmond City Councillor, Charles Osborne Luff (1851-1922), and Charlotte Luff (1854-1943), née Entwhistle, William John Luff was born on 15 January 1886.

He married Sarah Ross (1888-1976) in 1909. Their son, William Norman Charles Luff, a.k.a. "Bill Luff" played with Camberwell in the VFA and, then, with Essendon in the VFL.

He died on 6 September 1952.

== Football ==
He was a "tall, lightly-built" half-back flanker, "who was a fine high mark [and] possessed sound judgement and a good football brain".

=== Richmond (VFA) ===
Along with his brother Jim, Luff played for Richmond in the VFA competition from 1905 to 1907.

=== Richmond (VFL) ===
Richmond entered the VFL competition in 1908; and Luff played with 39 senior games for Richmond over three seasons (1908-1910). He was the first Richmond (VFL) footballer to represent Victoria — he played three games for Victoria in the Jubilee Australasian Football Carnival of 1908.

=== Prahran (VFA) ===
He transferred to Prahran in 1911. Where he played one game.

=== Beverley (MAFA) ===
In 1914, he was cleared from Prahran to the Beverley Football Club, in the Metropolitan Amateur Football Association.

== See also ==
- 1908 Melbourne Carnival
