= Harry Saltau =

Australian rules footballer

Personal information
- Full name: Heinrich Gordon Saltau
- Born: 17 September 1891; Warrnambool, Victoria
- Died: 25 July 1956 (aged 64); Chelsea, Victoria
- Original team: Port Melbourne Juniors
- Height: 180 cm (5 ft 11 in)
- Weight: 73 kg (161 lb)

Playing career^{1}
Years	Club	Games (Goals)
1912–1915	South Melbourne	50 (0)
- ^{1} Playing statistics correct to the end of 1915.

Harry Saltau (17 September 1891 – 25 July 1956) was an Australian rules footballer who played with South Melbourne in the Victorian Football League (VFL).

Saltau, a Port Melbourne junior, appeared in two grand finals during his brief league career. He was a back pocket in South Melbourne's 1912 and 1914 VFL Grand Final losses.
