= 1908 Melbourne Carnival =

Jubilee Australasian Football Carnival
1908 Melbourne Carnival
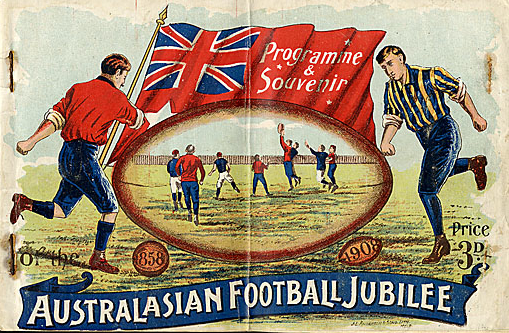
- Newby's souvenir carnival programme

Tournament details
- Country: Australia
- City: Melbourne
- Dates: August 1908
- Format: Round-robin

Final positions
- Champions: Victoria

The 1908 Melbourne Carnival was the inaugural Australian National Football Carnival, an Australian football interstate competition, held in Melbourne in August 1908. It was known at the time as the Jubilee Australasian Football Carnival because it was designed to commemorate 50 years of Australian football.

It was the first time in which all Australian states and New Zealand had competed together in the sport.

The winning team was presented with a silk pennant; and each member of the winning team received a gold championship medal.

Although the 29 August final between Victoria and Western Australia was played in front of something like 15,000 spectators, it is certain that the crowd would have been considerably larger if it had not also been the first day of the American Fleet's eight-day visit to Melbourne.

== Official opening ==
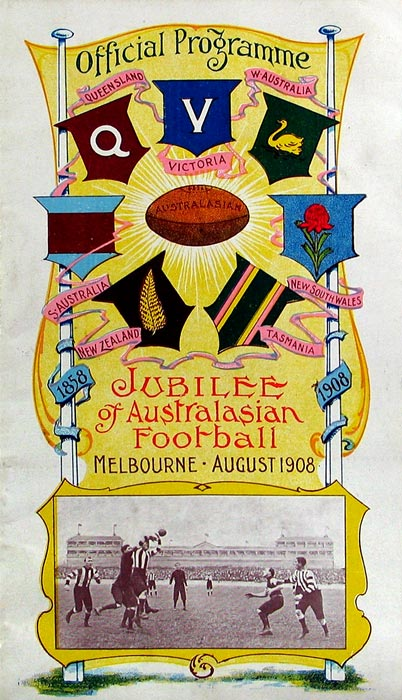
Official carnival programme

The official opening was conducted by Sir Thomas Gibson-Carmichael, the Governor of Victoria, at 3:00 pm on Wednesday 19 August 1908, in the interval between the first and second matches of the carnival (the first match started at 1:15 pm, the second at 3:30 pm).

Prime Minister and former player Alfred Deakin delivered a stirring nationalist speech to open the carnival

=== First Matches ===
The crowd of 7,000+ was in an excited mood: in the first match, New Zealand had come back from a 26-point half-time deficit to win by a single point.

The seven participating teams, with each player in their team uniforms, lined up and formed a hollow square.

The official party, the Governor of Victoria, accompanied by his private secretary, Victor Albert Nelson Hood (1862–1929), Sir Thomas Bent, Premier of Victoria, H. C. A. Harrison, Australian Rules administrative pioneer (then 71 years old), Mr. Cornelius Michael "Con" Hickey (1866-1937), Fitzroy footballer in the (VFA 1887-1894), secretary of the Fitzroy Football Club (1893-1910), foundation member and first treasurer of the Victorian Football League, and the inaugural president of the Australian National Football Council (formed in 1906), Mr. E.L. "Ernie" Wilson, the first secretary of the Collingwood Football Club in the VFL, and secretary of the VFL from 1897-1929, and Mr. Albert E. Nash, president of the New South Wales Australian Football League, were each introduced to the captain of each team and shook hands.

The ceremony was notable for the performance of "war cries" by both the New Zealand and Queensland teams; and, in the opinion of "Old Boy", despite not performing well on the football field, the Queensland "war cry" was the best of the two, in that its effort was "dramatic, descriptive, and interesting". Although it is not clear (as it was in the newspaper accounts of the New Zealand team on other occasions) from any of the contemporary reports of the day's proceedings whether, on this occasion, the New Zealand "war cry" was specifically a haka or not, "Follower's" report in "The Age" strongly suggests that to be the case: "a feature of the [Governor's] inspection...was the Maori war cry, given with great zest by the New Zealand team, and equally stirring was the aboriginal battle cry of the Queenslanders".

The second match, played immediately after the opening ceremony, was nowhere near as exciting: Tasmania beat Queensland by 140 points.

== Teams ==
Team photographs of all of the competing teams were published in the Melbourne Punch, and the Melbourne Leader.

=== New South Wales ===
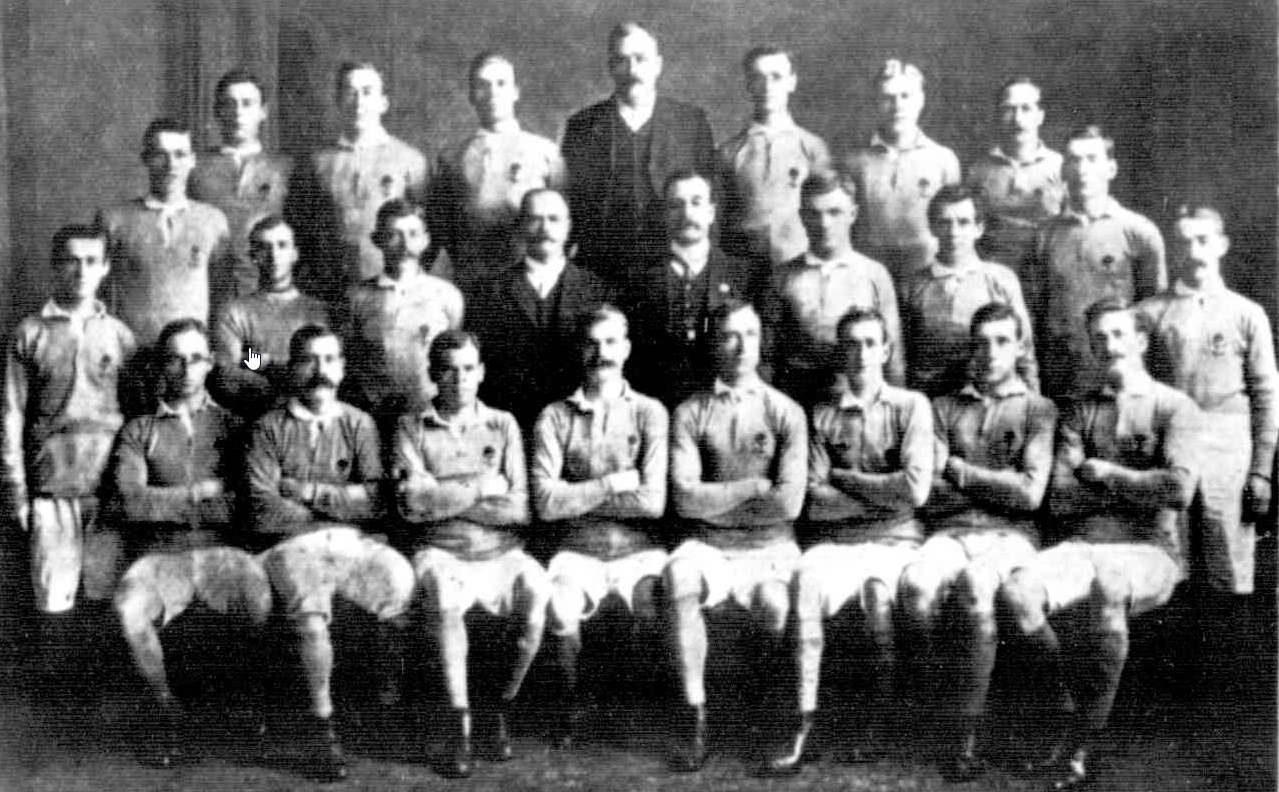
New South Wales team

The New South Wales team included A. Conlin, W. Scott, Bob Rahilly, J. Hunter, G. Colley, E. Gluyas, Bert Renfrey (Vice-Captain), and Algy Millhouse from the Barrier, and G. Thomas, W. Maxfield, G. McConechy, Ralph Robertson (Captain), T. Vannan, C. Murray, J. Delaney, H. Welsh, A. Dartnell, J. O'Leary, C. Shipton, and F. Carrick from Sydney; A.E. Watson from Hay, O'Keefe from Narrandera, plus James Greer and W. Hanes (also Haines, Haynes) from Wagga. During the carnival, the New South Wales team trained at the St Kilda Cricket Ground.

=== New Zealand ===
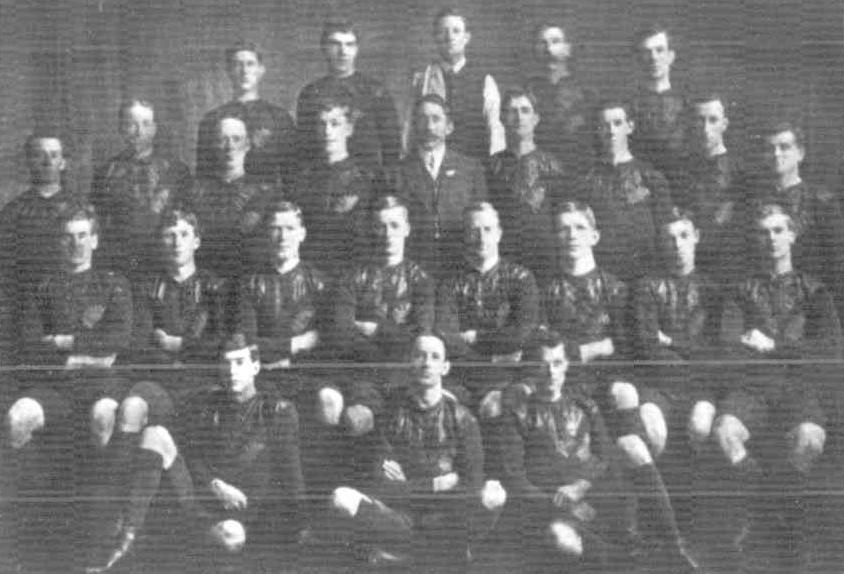
New Zealand team

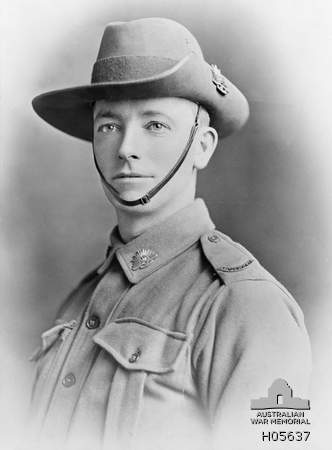
New Zealand's Captain, Tom Wright

The selected team was: E. George, F.A. Lording, W. Monteith, J.G. Marshall, Tongue, H. Fletcher, J.J. Abfalter (Auckland), P.H. Elvidge, S.G. Darby, A. Swann (Waihi), M. Bonas, D. Patrick, E. Furness, A. McGrath, L.L. Paull (Wellington), George Dempster, H.L. West, T.J. Wright (captain), H. Wilkinson, A. Porter, A. Fisher, Paisley, F. Ross (Christchurch), with emergencies, Burns, Welch, and L.A. Breese from Auckland, and Grant, and T. Smith. During the carnival, the New Zealand team trained at the Richmond Cricket Ground and was coached by Richmond's Dick Condon.

==== New Zealand's tour matches ====
This was the only time in the history of Australian rules "interstate" football matches that a team from New Zealand participated. It was anticipated that, immediately following the carnival, and before returning to New Zealand, the New Zealand team would play matches in Adelaide, Ballarat, Bendigo, Geelong, Sydney, Brisbane, and Newcastle.

The New Zealand team played a match, in Adelaide, on 1 September 1908 (Eight Hours Day), before the Governor, George Le Hunte, on a very wet ground (in several places the water was inches deep). South Australia won the match 5.8 (38) to 3.10 (28). The match was not as one-sided as the final scores indicate: the score at quarter time was South Australia 4.5 (29) to New Zealand 0.1 (1). In the process of the day, the New Zealand team performed two hakas, one before the match commenced, the other before the second half began.

All in all, the New Zealand team won six out of the eleven matches they played on their tour, including the carnival matches against New South Wales and Queensland, and were described in the Melbourne press as "the surprise packet"; and, due to the fact that only two of their matches were played on dry grounds, they also became known as the "wet weather birds".

=== Queensland ===
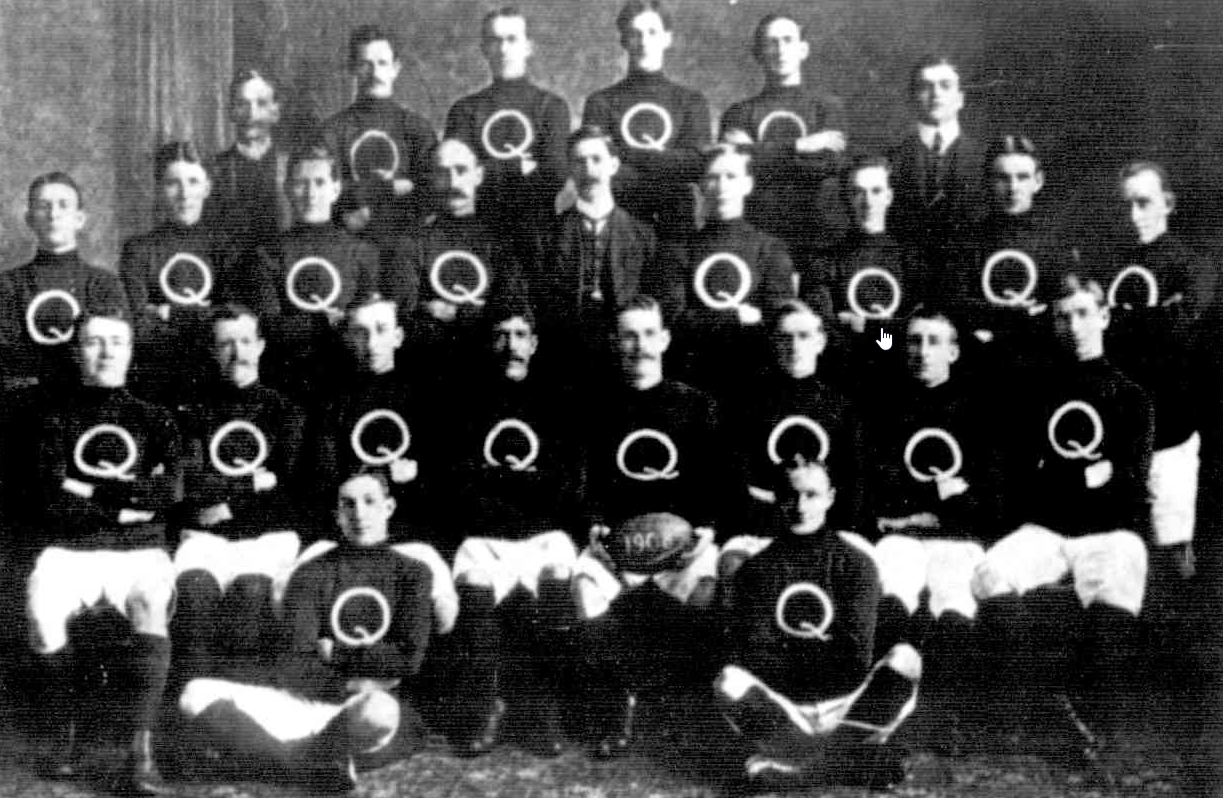
Queensland team

The selected team was: J. Hay, M.S. "Merce" Hicks, E. Miller, A. M'Gregor and T. Morris (City), V. "Vic" Lowndes, M. O'Dwyer, J. Greenwood, and Jack Keir (Locomotives), W. MacDonald, G. Paget, H. Heidemann, and J. M'Cormack (Ipswich), L. Perkins, and H. Parker (Valley), L. Kelly, A. "Jack" Bolton, and H. Hopkins (Wynnum), Ralph McKellar (captain), H. Coates, and A. Atkinson (Brisbane), and Lieutenant B. Watts (Thursday island). Emergencies: M. Cooper (Valley), A. Tipper (City), J. Hickey (West Moreton), and E. "Ernie" Watson (Ipswich). It seems that B. "Bas" Bolton was a later addition to the team. During the carnival, the Queensland team was coached by Jack Worrall, and trained at the Carlton Cricket Ground.

=== South Australia ===
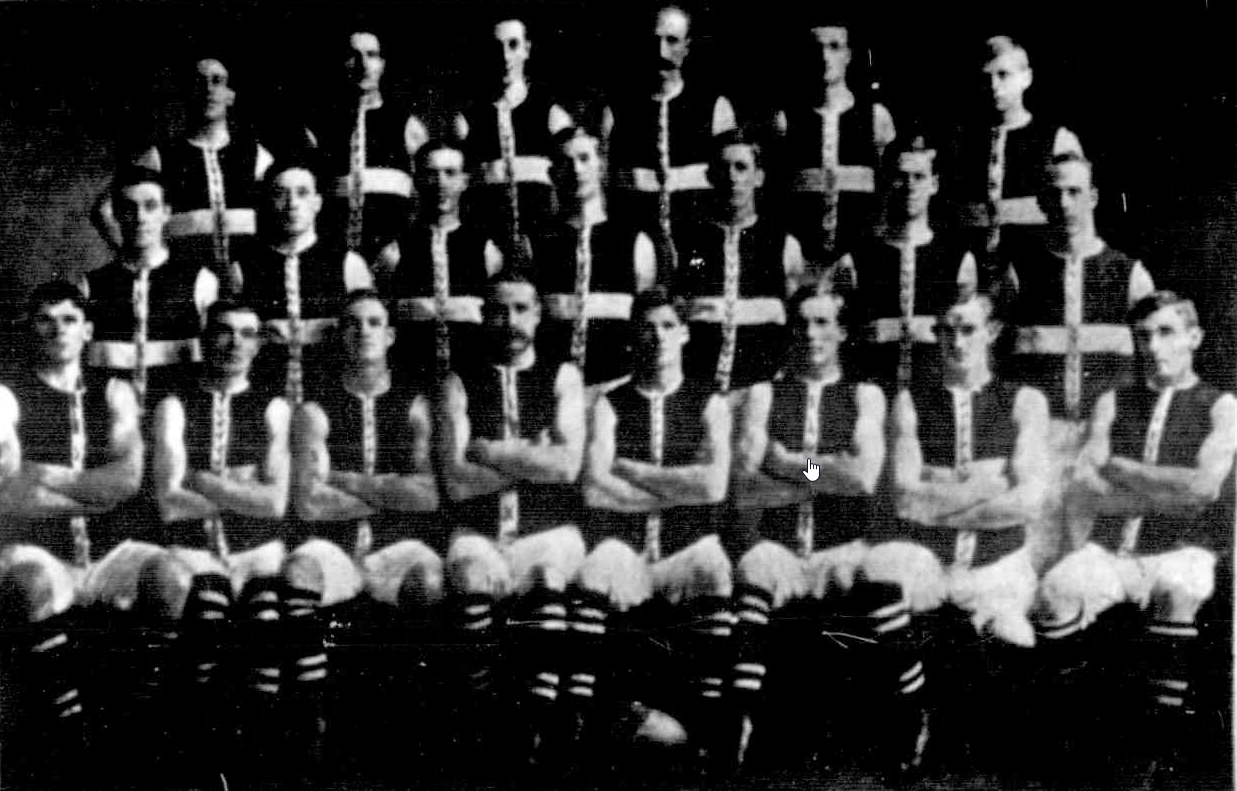
South Australian team

The selected team was; Charles George Gordon Gwynne, Ernie Johns, Jack Tredrea, Jack Chamberlain, Richard Townsend, Sinclair Dickson, Alfred Roy Le Messurier, Edward M. Beare, A.C. Bennett, O.H. Hyman. H.W.D. Stoddart, C. Adcock, T. McKenzie. A. Ewers, A.E. Hewitt, Stewart Geddes (vice captain), George Wallace, Jack Mack, Tom Leahy, James Tierney, John Albert "Alby" Bahr (captain), Jack Woollard. During the carnival, the South Australian team trained at the East Melbourne Cricket Ground.

The South Australian team that was defeated by Victoria 10.15 (75) to 2.14 (26) on 26 August 1908 was: Back, Ewers, Hyman, and Woollard; half-back, Stoddart, Beare, and McKenzie; centre, Hewitt, Tredrea, and Bennett; half-forward, Bahr, Townsend, and Chamberlain; forward, Dickson, Johns, and Gwynne; ruck, Tierney and Leahy; rover, Wallace.

=== Tasmania ===
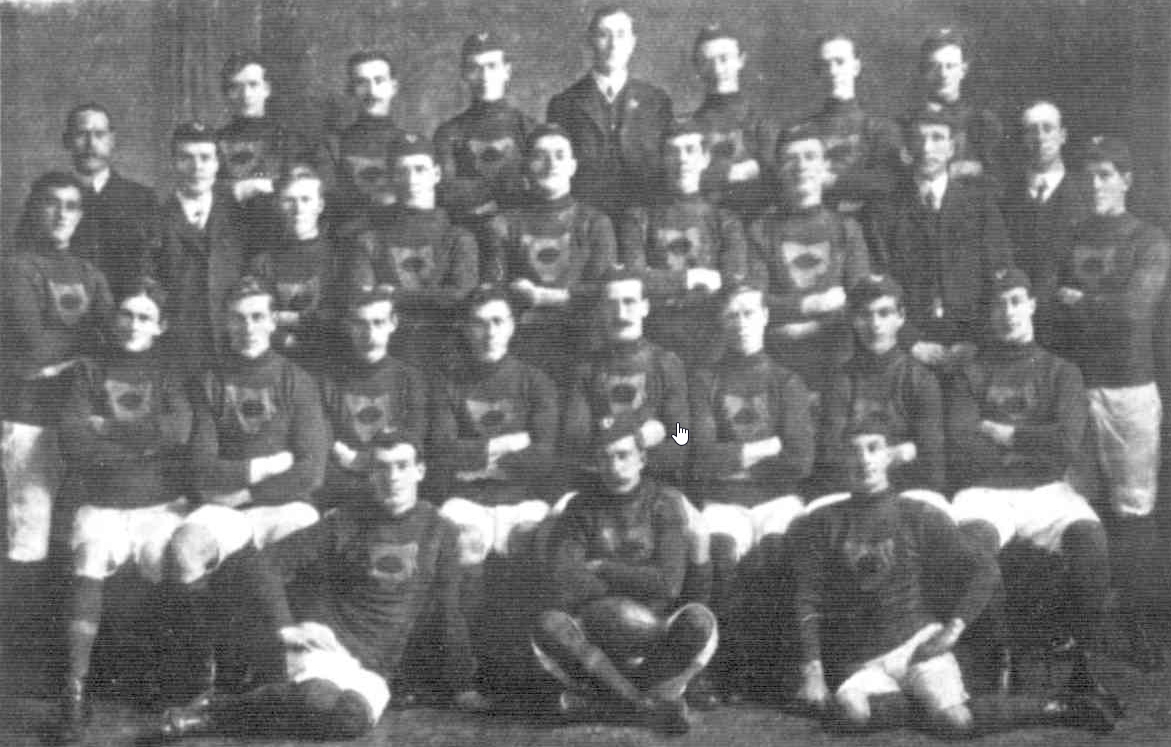
Tasmanian team

The captain of Tasmania was Bruce Carter. The squad originally selected was: from the South: Roy Bailey (half back), P. Orpwood (back), Walter Burrell (following and back), L. Bridges (wing), Weller Arnold (centre), C. Ward (centre and half-back), E. RusseIl (wing), W. Lee (forward and rover), T. Abel (follower), C. Webb (follower and back), W. Forster (rover and half-forward); from the North: Algy Tynan (full back), A.J. "Barney" Badcock (half-back), W. Ride (back), B.L. Thomson (back), Charlie Searl (wing), Hastings Woolley (half-back and follower),Joe Littler (forward), Viv Valentine (forward); from North-West Coast: B. Carter (centre), W. Rutter (follower), T. Mahoney (follower); from West Coast: A. Trotter (centre and forward), George McLeod (forward and follower). Emergencies: K. Appleby (North-West), first back and follower; Norman F Pannam (North West), first forward and second follower; L. Norman (North), rover and third forward; A. Tucker (South) second back and wing; B. Filgate (North-West), full back and wing. During the carnival, the Tasmanian team, coached by Jack Gardiner and Dick Gibson, trained at the South Melbourne Cricket Ground.

=== Victoria ===
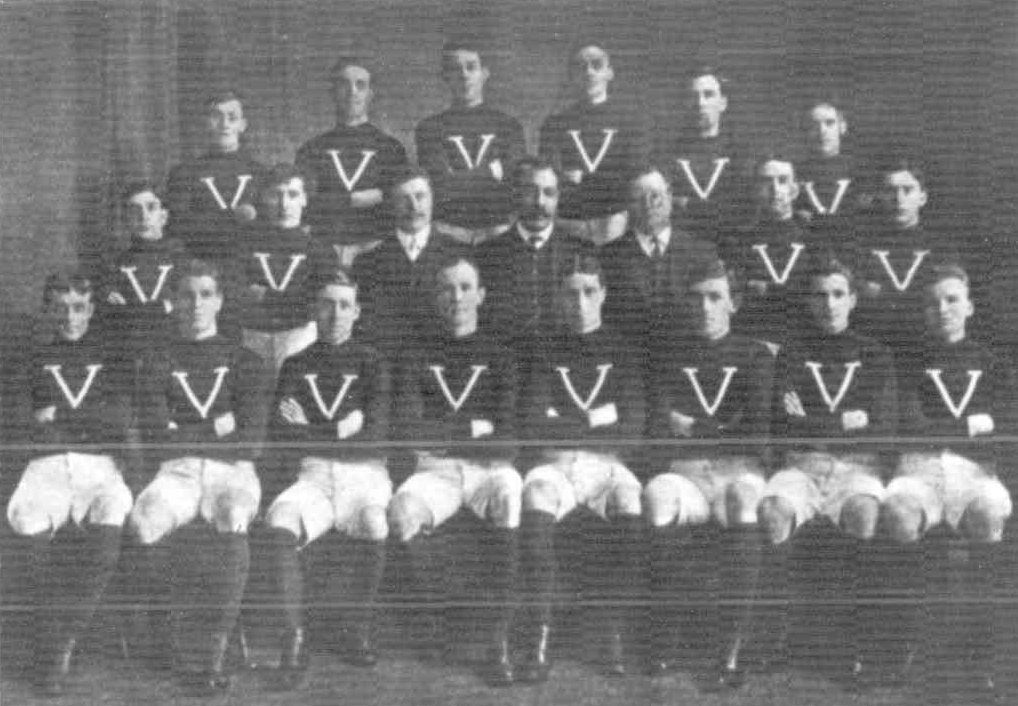
Victorian team

The Victorian team that defeated South Australia 10.15 (75) to 2.14 (26) on 26 August 1908 was:

Back, Joe Pearce (Melbourne), Robert Nash (Collingwood), and Phonse Wood (South Melbourne); half-back, Hugh Purse (Melbourne), Bill Busbridge (Essendon), and Bill Luff Sr. (Richmond); centre, Barclay Bailes (Fitzroy), Rod McGregor (Carlton), and George Bruce (Carlton); half-forward, Paddy Shea (Essendon), Dave McNamara (St Kilda), and Harvey Kelly (Carlton); forward, Wally Johnson (Fitzroy), Dick Lee (Collingwood), and Henry Young (Geelong); ruck, Herbert Milne (Fitzroy) and Bert Franks (South Melbourne); rover, Alick Ogilvie (University).

Before the first match was played, it was noted that six of the possible "Victorian" players, Barclay Bailes, Bert Franks, Bill Goddard (South Melbourne), Harvey Kelly, Paddy Shea, and Phonse Wood had all played their first senior football in Western Australia.

=== Western Australia ===
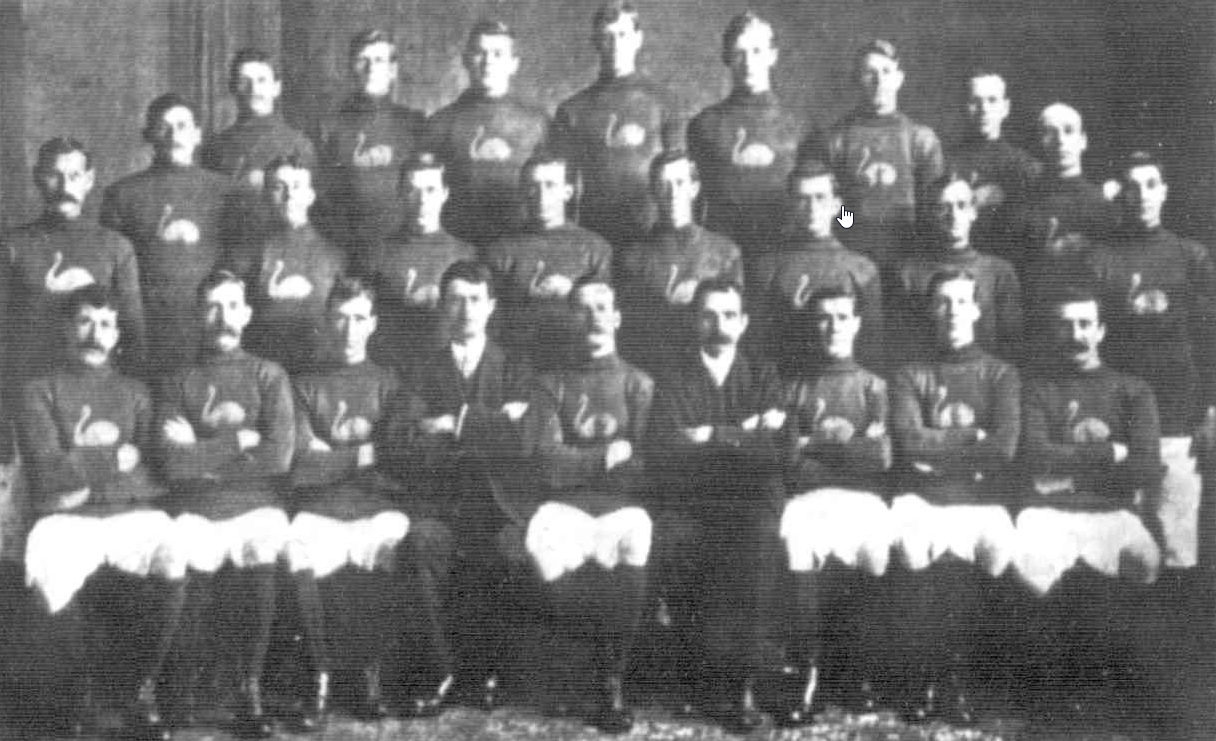
West Australian team

The selected team was: from metropolitan district: Jim Everett, Ronald Glen, Leonard Edwards, James Doig, Harry Sharpe, Thomas McNamara, Sam Gravenall, George Wyatt, Henry Thompson, Frank 'Diver' Dunne, Dick Sweetman, Billy Orr; from goldfields: William Trewhella, Phil Matson, William "Nipper" Truscott, Alex Robinson, Walter Smith, George Tyson, William Cook, George Renwick, William Metheral, J. "Snob" Polglaise, Charles Tyson, Joe O'Dea. During the carnival, the Western Australian team trained at the Fitzroy Cricket Ground.

== Playing uniforms ==
In competition, the teams' uniforms were:

- New South Wales:Royal blue with a red waratah on breast; white knickers; royal blue hose.
- New Zealand: All black with gold fern leaf; black knickers; black hose,
- Queensland: Dark maroon with white 'Q' monogram; white knickers; maroon hose with white tops.
- South Australia: Turquoise with brown band; white knickers; turquoise blue hose.
- Tasmania: Green, rose and primrose braces, map of Tasmania on breast with football in centre; white knickers; green hose.
- Victoria: Dark blue with white letter 'V'; white hose; dark blue hose.
- Western Australia: Dark green jersey with gold swan on breast; white knickers; dark green hose with white tops.

When not playing, the members of each team wore plain straw hats that clearly displayed their team's distinctive colours on their hat-bands:

- New South Wales: Light royal blue band, displaying a red waratah emblem.
- New Zealand: Black band, displaying a gold fern leaf emblem.
- Queensland: Dark maroon band, displaying a white letter "Q".
- South Australia: Brown with turquoise band, displaying a football with the letters "S.A.".
- Tasmania: Myrtle green band, displaying a small map of Tasmania in primrose, with a rose football in the centre;
- Victoria: Oxford blue band, displaying a white letter 'V'.
- Western Australia: dark green band, displaying a gold swan.

== Results ==
The program for the carnival was arranged as follows:

- The seven teams were broken up into two sections:
  - The stronger Section A comprised Victoria, South Australia and Western Australia
  - The weaker Section B comprised Tasmania, New South Wales, New Zealand and Queensland
- Ten preliminary matches were played. These games were:
  - A full round-robin amongst the four section B teams
  - Two matches within Section A: South Australia vs Western Australia; and Victoria vs the loser of the first game
  - Two matches between a Section A team and a Section B team: Victoria vs New Zealand; and New South Wales vs the winner of the South Australia vs Western Australia game
- From there, finals were played:
  - The third placed team from Section A played the first placed team from Section B for third and fourth place
  - The first placed team from Section A played the second placed team from Section A for first and second place
  - If two undefeated teams remained, a Grand Final was to be played between them to decide the championship

All of the matches were played at the Melbourne Cricket Ground.

=== Preliminary matches ===
Day One

Section	Winning team	score	Losing team	score	Date	Attendance
Section B	New Zealand	9.9 (63)	New South Wales	8.14 (62)	Wednesday 19 August 1908	7,000
Section B	Tasmania	22.22 (154)	Queensland	2.2 (14)	Wednesday 19 August 1908	

Day Two

Section	Winning team	score	Losing team	score	Date
Section A/B	Victoria	25.21 (171)	New Zealand	5.10 (40)	Friday 21 August 1908

Day Three

Section	Winning team	score	Losing team	score	Date
Section B	Tasmania	8.14 (62)	New South Wales	4.11 (35)	Saturday 22 August 1908
Section A	Western Australia	8.11 (59)	South Australia	8.5 (53)	Saturday 22 August 1908

Day Four

Section	Winning team	score	Losing team	score	Date
Section B	New Zealand	6.12 (48)	Queensland	4.11 (35)	Monday 24 August 1908

Day Five

Section	Winning team	score	Losing team	score	Date
Section A/B	Western Australia	17.12 (114)	New South Wales	12.3 (75)	Tuesday 25 August 1908

Day Six

Section	Winning team	score	Losing team	score	Date
Section A	Victoria	10.15 (75)	South Australia	2.14 (26)	Wednesday 26 August 1908
Section B	Tasmania	11.18 (84)	New Zealand	1.12 (18)	Wednesday 26 August 1908

Day Seven

Section	Winning team	score	Losing team	score	Date
Section B	New South Wales	13.15 (93)	Queensland	8.11 (59)	Thursday 27 August 1908

=== Preliminary round ladders ===
Section A
Pos	Team	Pld	W	L	D	PF	PA	Pts
1	Victoria	2	2	0	0	246	66	8
2	Western Australia	2	2	0	0	173	128	8
3	South Australia	2	0	2	0	119	305	0

Section B
Pos	Team	Pld	W	L	D	PF	PA	Pts
1	Tasmania	3	3	0	0	300	67	12
2	New Zealand	4	2	2	0	169	352	8
3	New South Wales	4	1	3	0	265	298	4
4	Queensland	3	0	3	0	108	295	0

=== Finals ===
Day Eight

Section	Winning team	score	Losing team	score	Date	Attendance
Section A/B	South Australia	16.20 (116)	Tasmania	7.7 (49)	Saturday 29 August 1908	
Section A	Victoria	13.22 (100)	Western Australia	6.8 (44)	Saturday 29 August 1908	15,000

Because Tasmania was beaten by South Australia, Victoria was the only remaining undefeated team. Therefore, it was crowned the champions without the need for a Grand Final.

== Gameplay gallery ==
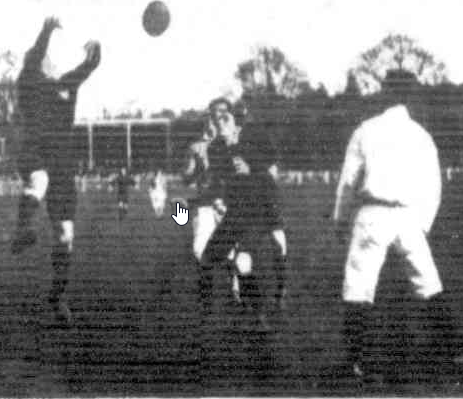
New Zealander high marking in the team's 1908 defeat of New South Wales

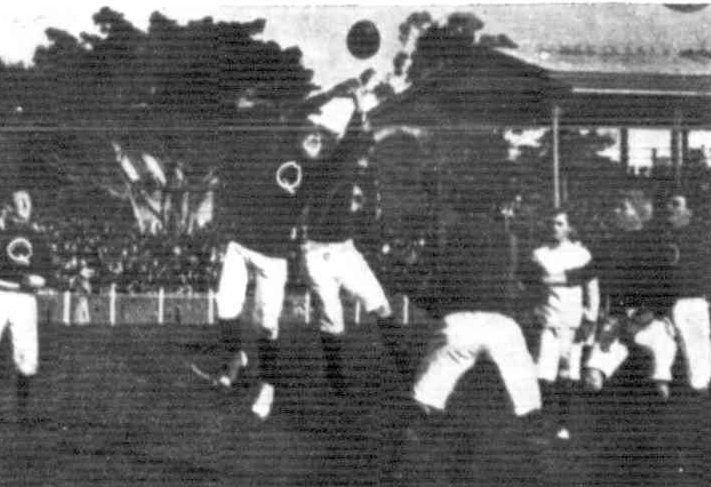
Queensland vs Tasmania marking contest

== Team gallery ==
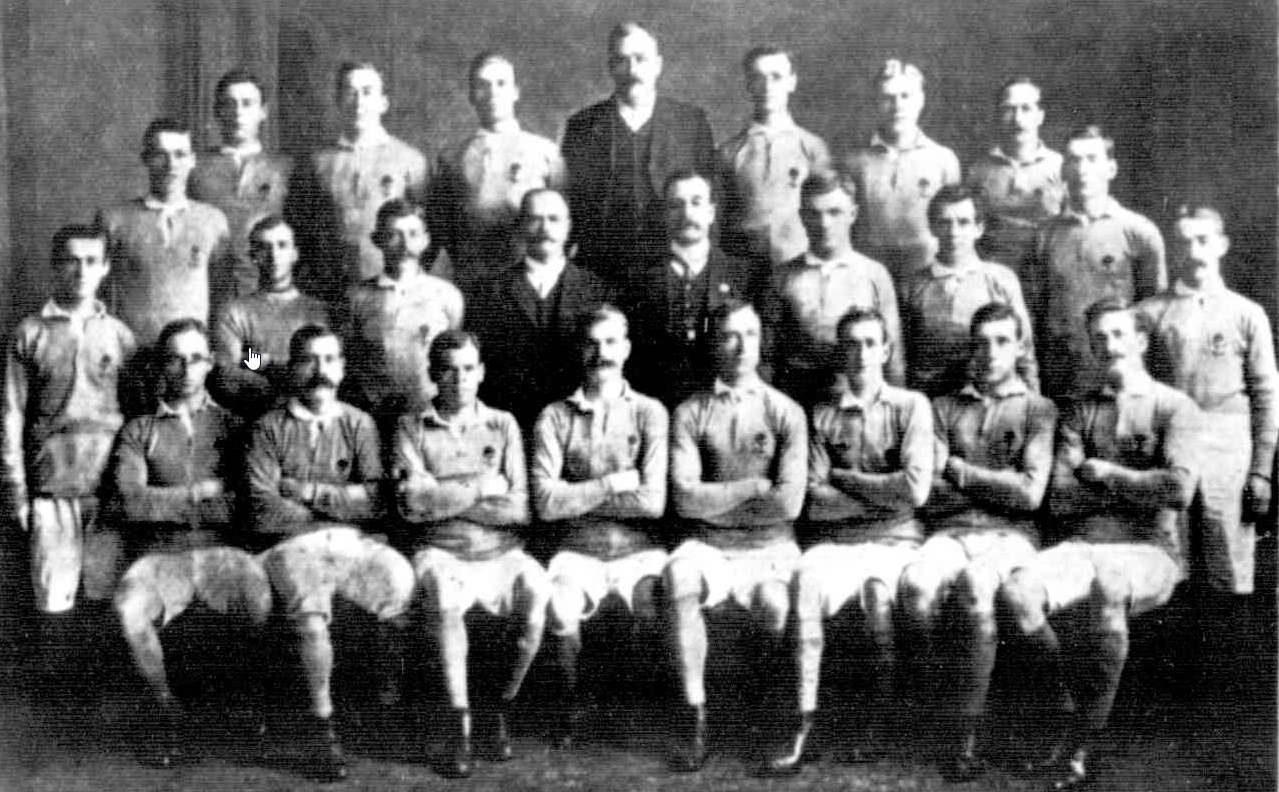
New South Wales team

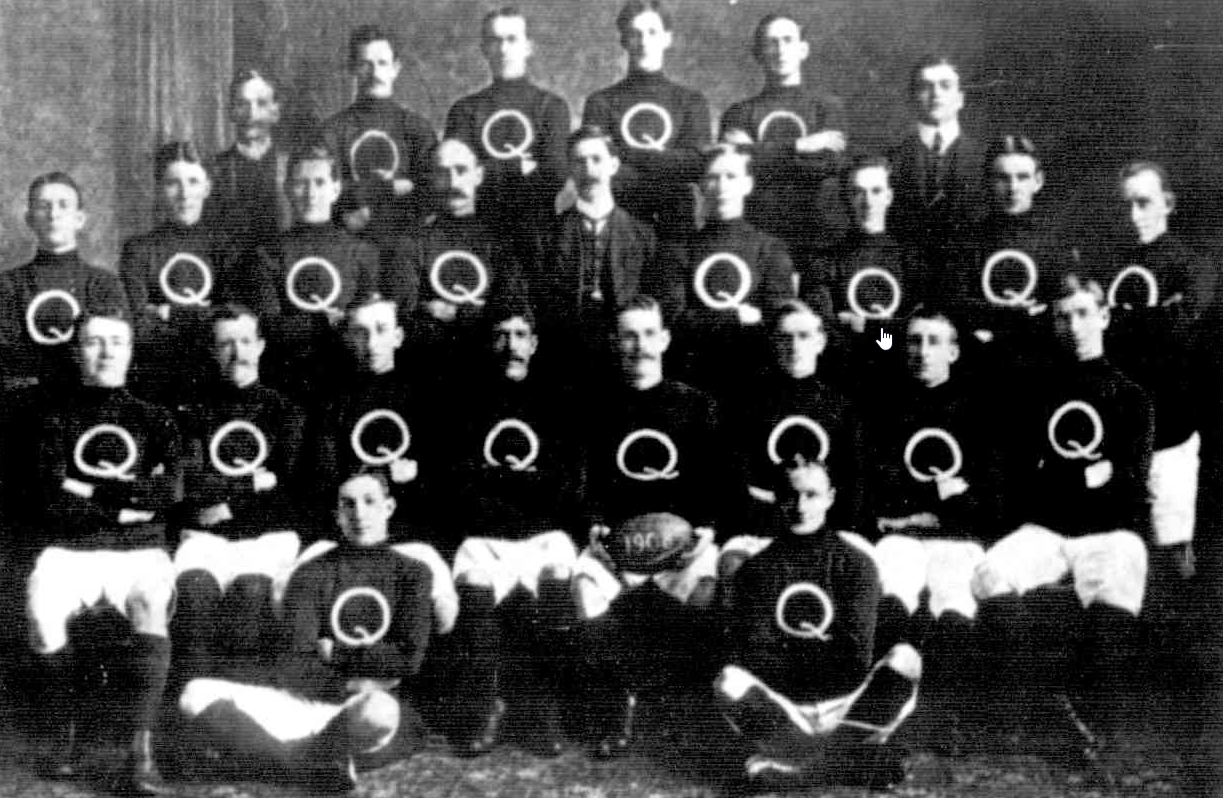
Queensland team

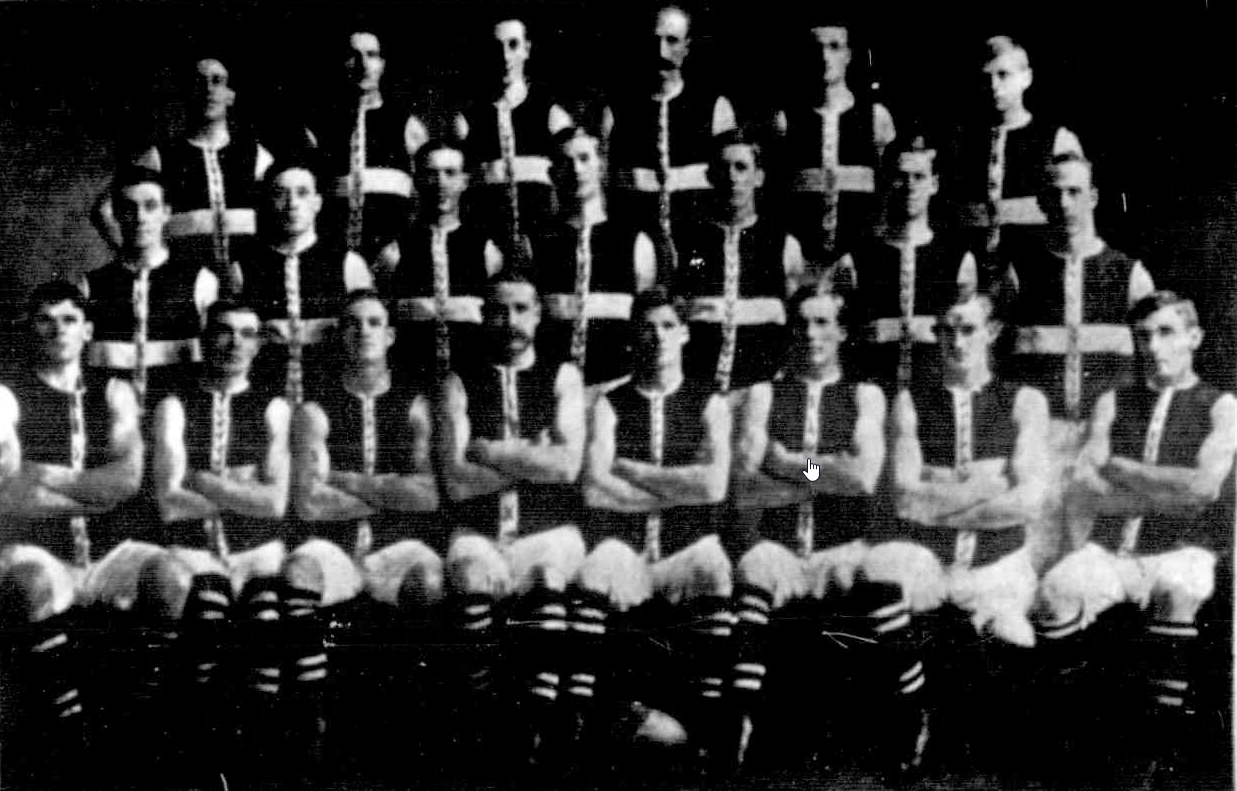
South Australian team

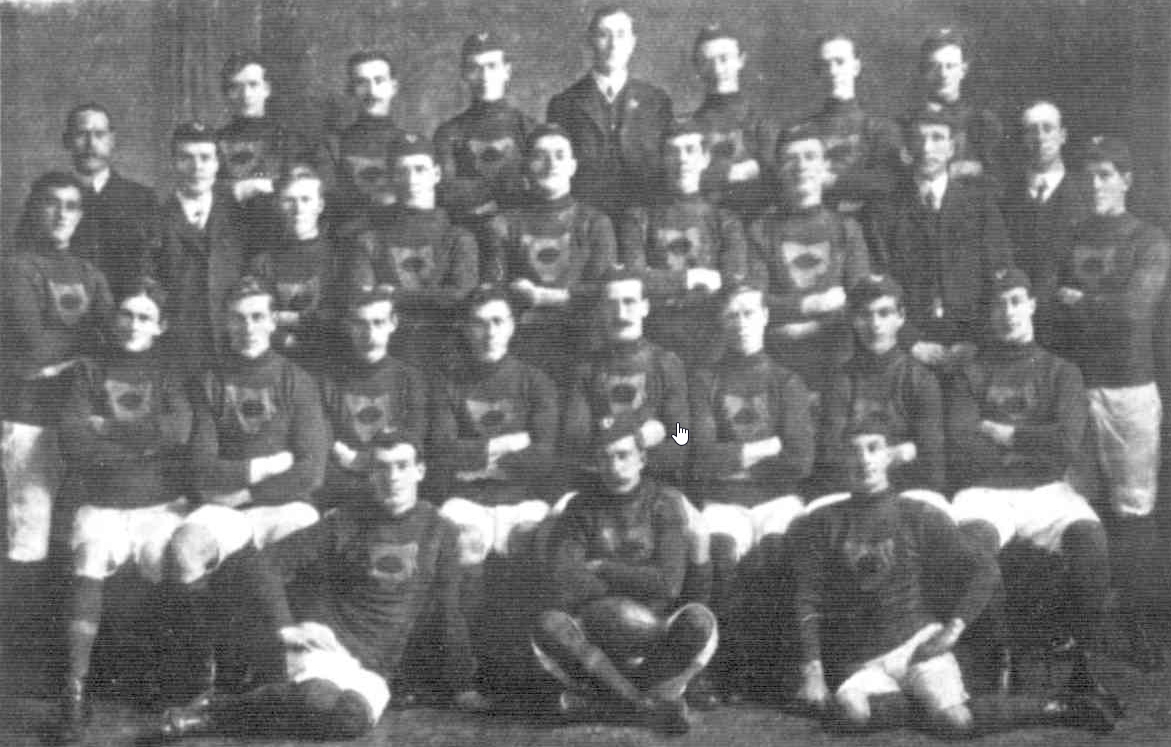
Tasmanian team

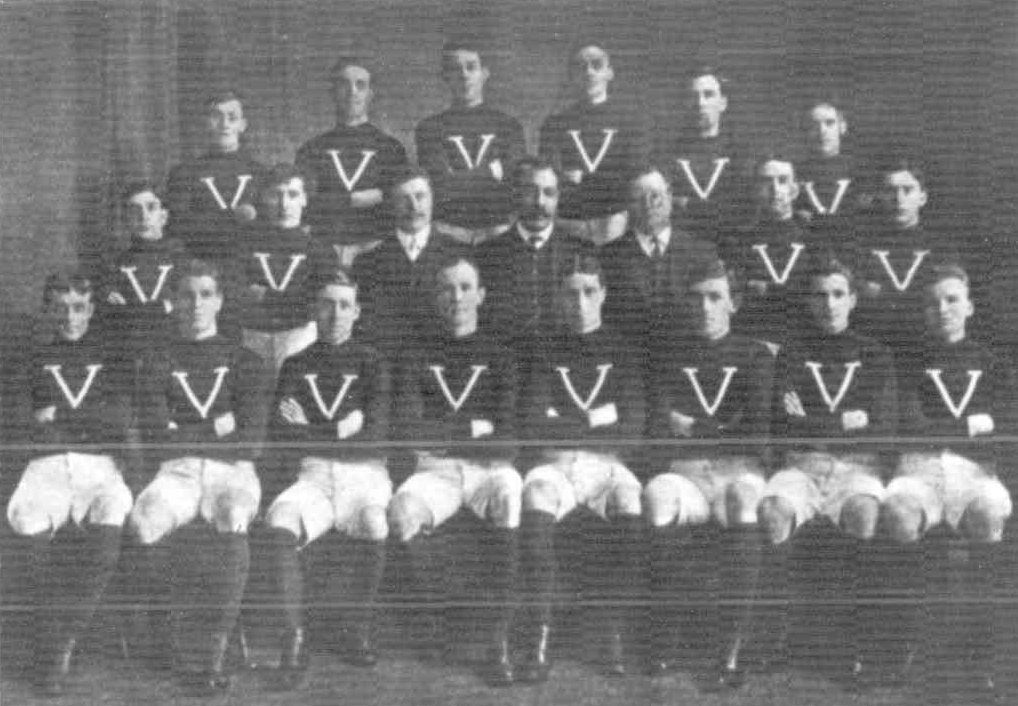
Victorian team

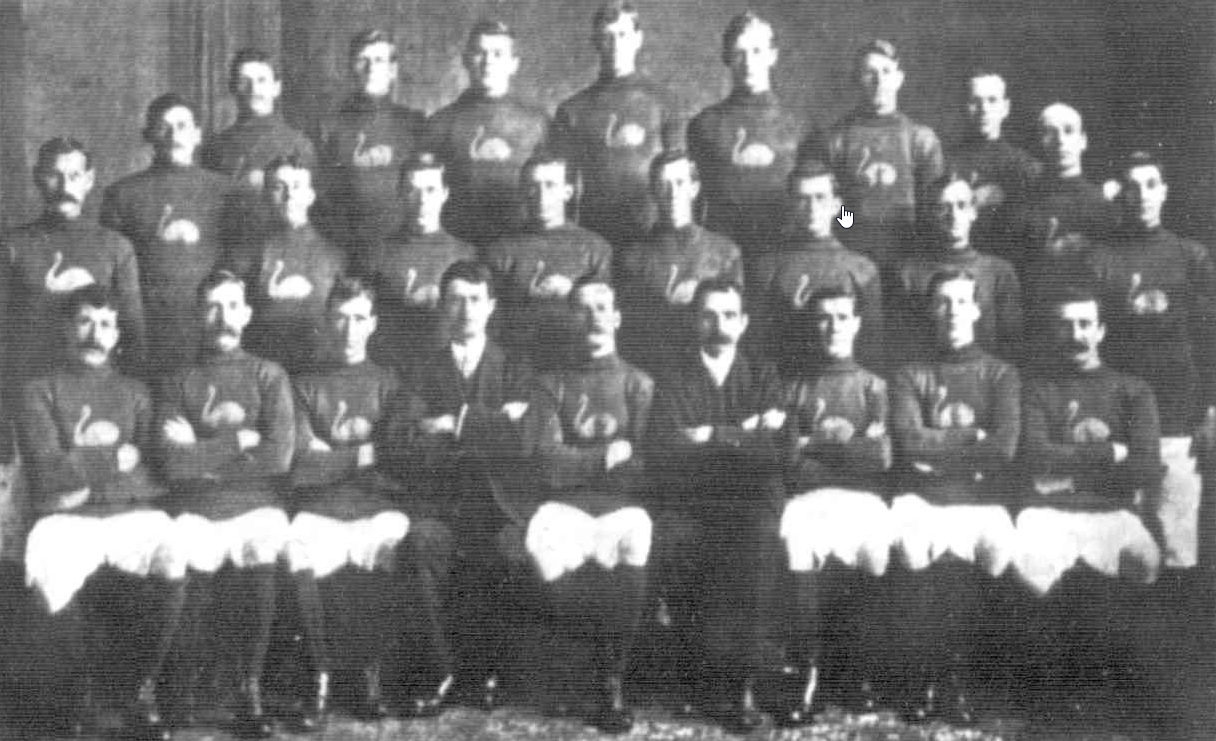
West Australian team

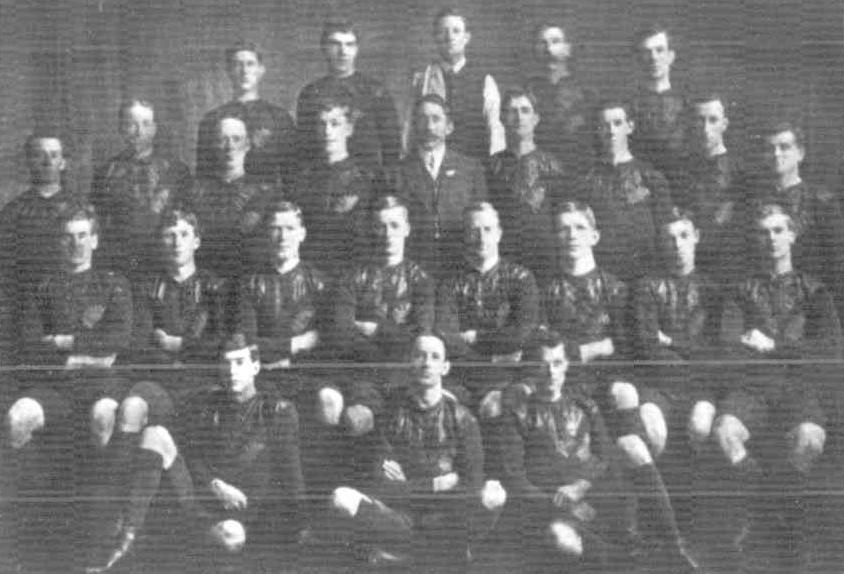
New Zealand team

== Best players ==
- New South Wales: Colley, Robertson, Rahilly, Gluyas, Maxfield
- New Zealand: Darby, Elvidge, Wilkins, Wright, George
- Queensland: Coates, Watts, Kelly, Paget, Hicks
- South Australia: Tredrea, Tierney, Le Mesurier, Gwynne, Chamberlain, Townsend
- Tasmania: Carter, Lee, Mahoney, Bridges, Webb, Littler, Arnold
- Victoria: Shea, Pearce, Busbridge, Luff, McGregor, Bailes, McNamara
- Western Australia: Gravenall, Dunne, Matson, Metherell, Orr, Truscott

== See also ==
- 1908 VFL season
- 1908 SAFL season
- 1908 WAFL season
