= Hastings Woolley =

Australian cricketer (1884–1946)

Personal information
- Full name: Hastings Talbot Woolley
- Born: 6 June 1884; Melbourne, Australia
- Died: 3 February 1946 (aged 61); Sydney, Australia

Domestic team information
- Years: Team
- 1908/09: Tasmania
- Source: Cricinfo, 19 January 2016

Hastings Talbot Woolley (6 June 1884 – 3 February 1946) was an Australian cricketer. He played one first-class match for Tasmania in 1908/09.

== Family ==
He was the son of Dr. George Talbot Woolley (1856–1916), M.R.C.S. (England), who practised medicine in Castlemaine for 32 years, and Elizabeth Mary Woolley, née Evans, and the cousin of the English cricket all-rounder Frank Woolley. He had a sister, Kathleen (1886–1967), a.k.a. "Kitty", and a brother, Leonard Talbot Woolley (1894–1971).

He moved to Tasmania in January 1904 to take up employment with Mount Lyell Co. He married Alma Marie Davis (-1951) in Tasmania in June 1905. They had two children; George Talbot (1910-), and a daughter, Dorothy (later, Mrs. Hilton Porter, of New Zealand — she and her husband, singer and actor Hilton Porter survived the torpedoing of the SS Athenia in 1939).

== Football ==
As a schoolboy, he played for the Castlemaine Grammar School's First XVIII.

=== Tasmania ===
On moving to Tasmania, he was playing top grade senior football continuously (with Launceston) until 1911 — "[Woollley] was one of the finest players in Tasmania last year" (Daily Herald, 13 April 1912).

He was selected to represent Tasmania in the Jubilee Australasian Football Carnival conducted in Melbourne in 1908. However he could not obtain leave of absence from his employment, and was forced to withdraw from the team (his place in the team was taken by Albert Pannam).

=== South Australia ===
In 1912, Launceston granted him a clearance to South Australia; and he played his first match, for North Adelaide, on 6 May 1912.

== Athlete ==
He was a well-performed athlete, competing at both quarter- and half-mile (440 and 880 yards).

== Cricket ==
=== Tasmania ===
He played for Tasmania in one inter-state match, against Victoria, in Launceston in February 1909. At the close of play on the first day Tasmania were all out for 163 (Woolley was out, bowled, for 4 runs); and Victoria were none for 78 (Wooley was none for 7). At the close of play on the second day Victoria was 7 for 581; Woolley's figures were 6 overs, no maidens, for 34 runs. At the close of play on the third and final day Victoria had won the match by an innings and 287 runs; in its first innings Victoria scored 626 runs for 10 wickets (Woolley was not asked to bowl again), and Tasmania were all out for 176 (Woolley was out, caught, again for 4 runs).

In 1909 he represented the Northern Tasmania Cricket Association in Launceston.

=== South Australia ===
He played cricket for the North Adelaide Cricket Club from 1912 to 1915.

== Boer War ==
He enlisted in the 6th Battalion, Australian Commonwealth Horse, for service in South Africa, in the Second Boer War in April 1902. The war ended on 31 May 1902, while Woolley and his comrades were still en route to South Africa.

== Physical culture instructor ==
In 1911 he was appointed as an Assistant Instructor in the Tasmanian Physical Training Branch of the junior cadets.

In 1912, he moved to South Australia; and in March 1913 he was provisionally appointed as "Honorary Lieutenant H. T. Woolley", of the "Instructional Staff", of the "Physical Training" section of the "Military Forces of the Commonwealth". He resigned his commission in March 1917.

He often lectured on fitness matters.

On moving his Institute of Physical Culture from Launceston to Sydney in 1917, he represented his service as follows: "Last 5½ years Commonwealth Staff Officer of Physical Training".

== Death ==
He died in Sydney on 3 February 1946, having collapsed at the bowling green in Birrell Street, Waverley, while playing lawn bowls for the City Bowling Club.

== See also ==
- List of Tasmanian representative cricketers
- 1908 Melbourne Carnival
