= Bill Cook (footballer, born 1887) =

Australian rules footballer

Personal information
- Full name: William Cook
- Born: 6 September 1887; Bendigo, Victoria
- Died: 10 June 1949 (aged 61); Richmond, Victoria
- Original team: Bendigo City
- Height: 179 cm (5 ft 10 in)
- Weight: 86 kg (190 lb)
- Position: Centre half-forward

Playing career^{1}
Years	Club	Games (Goals)
1914	Carlton	16 (27)
- ^{1} Playing statistics correct to the end of 1914.

William Cook (6 September 1887 – 10 June 1949) was an Australian rules footballer who played with Carlton in the Victorian Football League (VFL).

Cook kicked five goals in his VFL debut and was a centre half-forward in Carlton's 1914 premiership team. He was their leading goal-kicker that year with 27 goals, in what was his only league season.
