= Bob Rahilly =

Australian rules footballer

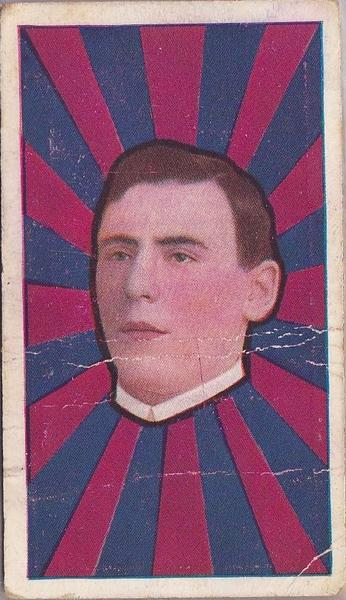
- Cigarette card of Rahilly in 1911

Personal information
- Full name: Robert Alfred Rahilly
- Born: 12 July 1887; Ballarat, Victoria
- Died: 9 December 1935 (aged 48); Nhill, Victoria
- Original team: South Ballarat
- Height: 170 cm (5 ft 7 in)

Playing career^{1}
| Years | Club | Games (Goals) |
| 1910–12 | Fitzroy | 33 (21) |
| 1914 | Essendon | 2 (4) |
| Total | | 35 (25) |
- ^{1} Playing statistics correct to the end of 1914.

Robert Alfred Rahilly (12 July 1887 – 9 December 1935) was an Australian rules football player. He was born in Ballarat, Victoria.

== Playing career ==
Rahilly's senior career began in Ballarat for South Ballarat Football Club.

He played in Broken Hill; and, from there, represented New South Wales in the 1908 Melbourne Carnival.

In 1910 he moved to Fitzroy in the Victorian Football League where he played 33 matches before leaving in late 1912 to return to South Ballarat.

In a match for Fitzroy in 1911 against St Kilda Rahilly hit the goalposts four times in a match, which remains a record for VFL/AFL football (Alby Pannam equalled this feat in 1936).

Rahilly spent time at Sturt in South Australia during 1913 before moving to Broken Hill.

The 1914 season saw Rahilly return to the VFL, playing two matches for Essendon before moving again to Northcote.

== Military service ==
Rahilly enlisted with the Australian Imperial Force in June 1915, leaving Melbourne in November 1915 on HMAT Ascanius. After serving in France and rising to the rank of Sergeant, Rahilly returned to Australia in March 1919.
