= Harry Morgan (footballer) =

Australian rules footballer (1889–1965)

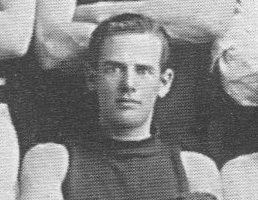

Personal information
- Full name: William Henry Morgan
- Born: 24 March 1889; Parramatta, New South Wales
- Died: 23 May 1965 (aged 76); Hobart, Tasmania
- Original team: Subiaco
- Height: 180 cm (5 ft 11 in)
- Weight: 73 kg (161 lb)
- Position: Forward

Playing career^{1}
Years	Club	Games (Goals)
1910–13; 1920	Subiaco	82 (unknown)
1914–15; 1917–18	South Melbourne	60 (100)
1919	Footscray	16 (66)
1921	Carlton	10 (25)
1922	West Adelaide	5 (12)

Representative team honours
Years	Team	Games (Goals)
1910	Western Australia	2 (0)
- ^{1} Playing statistics correct to the end of 1922.

Career highlights
- Subiaco premiership side 1912; Footscray premiership side 1919

William Henry Morgan (24 March 1889 – 23 May 1965) was an Australian rules footballer who played senior football in three different Australian states.

== Family ==
The son of George Morgan, and Ellen Morgan, née Child, William Henry Morgan was born at Harris Park in Parramatta, New South Wales on 24 March 1889.

== Football ==
=== Cottesloe (WAFA) ===
Morgan moved to Perth in the late 1900s, where he began playing for the Cottesloe Football Club in the second-level West Australian Football Association (WAFA), a precursor to the present Claremont Football Club.

=== Subiaco (WAFL) ===
In 1910, he transferred to the Subiaco Football Club in the West Australian Football League (WAFL), and spent most of his time at either half back or as a centreman. A dual Western Australian interstate representative, Morgan was a member of Subiaco's 1912 premiership teams.

=== South Melbourne (VFL) ===
When he became a VFL footballer with South Melbourne in 1914, Morgan began playing as a forward was the top goal-kicker at his club twice, on both sides of their war enforced recess in 1916. He had kicked 27 in 1914, and his most impressive tally came in 1915 when he managed 48 goals, finishing third in the VFL behind Collingwood's Dick Lee and Fitzroy's Jimmy Freake.

While at South Melbourne he also played in the forward pocket in the team's 1914 Grand Final loss to Carlton. Despite making eight appearances in 1918, Morgan was not selected in that year's premiership team.

=== Footscray (VFA) ===
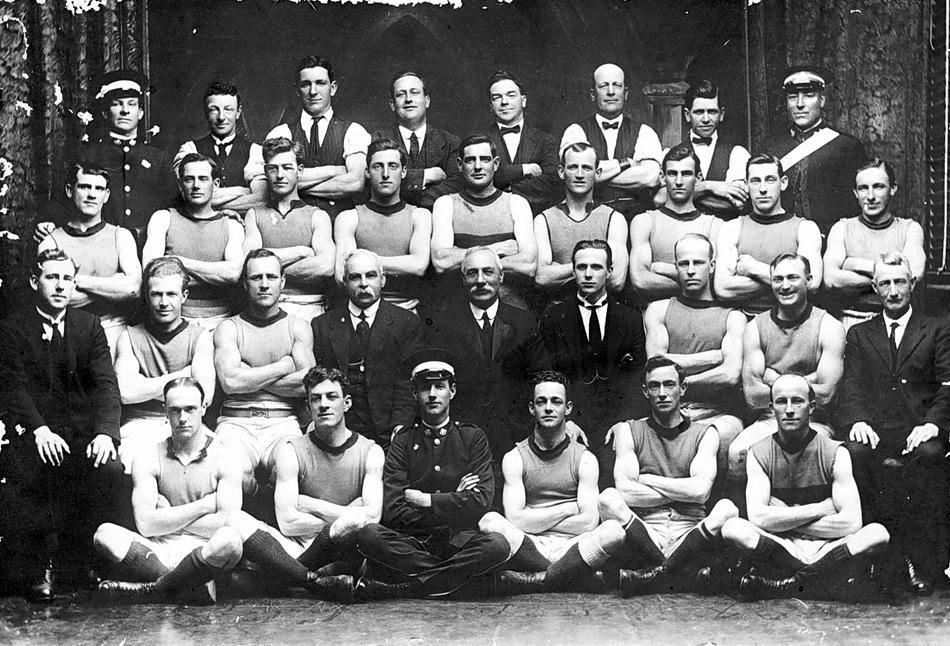
Footscray's 1919 Premiership Team Morgan second from left, 3rd row back

Footscray acquired his services for the 1919 VFA season. He was a member of their premiership side that year.

=== Subiaco (WAFL) ===
In 1920 he returned to Subiaco for another stint.

=== Carlton (VFL) ===
In 1921, he returned to the VFL playing for Carlton. Morgan had a good start at Carlton, kicking five goals from full-forward in his first game for the club and another five in his third.

=== West Adelaide (SANFL) ===
In 1922, he moved to the West Adelaide Football Club in the South Australian National Football League (SANFL), where he made five appearances for 12 goals.

=== North Broken Hill (BHFL) ===
In 1923 he was playing for the North Broken Hill Football Club in the Broken Hill Football League (BHFL): and in 1924 he was the team's captain.
