= Jack Lowe (Australian footballer) =

Australian rules footballer

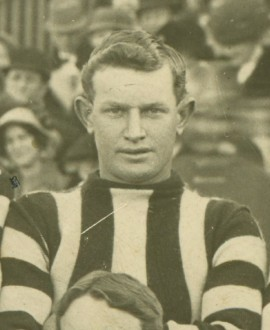
- Lowe in 1912

Personal information
- Full name: John Lowe
- Born: 24 October 1890; Yarrawonga, Victoria
- Died: 1 May 1944 (aged 53)
- Original team: Seymour
- Height: 178 cm (5 ft 10 in)
- Weight: 77 kg (170 lb)
- Position: Follower/Forward

Playing career^{1}
Years	Club	Games (Goals)
1912–13	Collingwood	25 (24)
1914	Carlton	13 (9)
Total		38 (33)
- ^{1} Playing statistics correct to the end of 1914.

Jack Lowe (24 October 1890 – 1 May 1944) was an Australian rules footballer who played for Collingwood and Carlton in the Victorian Football League (VFL).

Lowe began his career at Collingwood and kicked 17 goals for them in 1913 before crossing to Carlton the following year. His last league match was the 1914 VFL Grand Final, where he played from the half forward pocket in Carlton's win over South Melbourne.

He died from pneumonia on 1 May 1944.
