= Viv Valentine =

Australian rules footballer and coach

Personal information
- Full name: Vivian Guy Valentine
- Born: 3 December 1887; Launceston, Tasmania
- Died: 7 August 1967 (aged 79); Cheltenham, Victoria
- Original team: Launceston Football Club
- Debut: Round 1, 1897, Carlton vs. South Melbourne, at Princes Park
- Height: 168 cm (5 ft 6 in)
- Weight: 71 kg (157 lb)

Playing career^{1}
Years	Club	Games (Goals)
1911–1918	Carlton	116 (91)

Coaching career
Years	Club	Games (W–L–D)
1919	Carlton	17 (10–7–0)
- ^{1} Playing statistics correct to the end of 1918.

Vivian Guy Valentine (3 December 1887 – 7 August 1967) was an Australian rules footballer and coach in the Victorian Football League.

Valentine made his debut for the Carlton Football Club in Round 2 of the 1911 season.

He retired from playing the game in 1918 and coached the Blues in the 1919 season.

== Death ==
He died in Cheltenham, Victoria on 7 August 1967.

== See also ==
- 1908 Melbourne Carnival
