= Ernie Jamieson =

Australian rules footballer

Personal information
- Full name: Ernest Michael Jamieson
- Born: 4 June 1888; Carlton, Victoria
- Died: 8 September 1983 (aged 95)
- Original team: Williamstown
- Height: 178 cm (5 ft 10 in)
- Weight: 74 kg (163 lb)
- Position: Full-back

Playing career^{1}
| Years | Club | Games (Goals) |
| 1909–16; 1921–22 | Carlton | 125 (4) |
- ^{1} Playing statistics correct to the end of 1922.

Ernest Michael Jamieson (4 June 1888 – 8 September 1983) was an Australian rules footballer who played for Carlton in the Victorian Football League (VFL).

A key member of Carlton's defence in a successful era, Jamieson played in 14 finals with Carlton. He was used initially as a wingman following his recruitment from Williamstown, from which he played the 1910 Grand Final, but found a home at full-back when he performed well in that position late in the 1911 season.

Jamieson, renowned for his skills when kicking in after a behind, was a VFL representative in 1913. A full-back in the 1914 and 1915 Carlton premiership teams, Jamieson was a hero in the former when he punched the ball away from South Melbourne forward Tom Bollard in the goal square, preventing a last second goal which would have levelled the scores.

He broke his arm in the 1916 Preliminary Final and as a result missed the premiership decider that year. The defender had surgery but suffered complications which kept him out of action for four seasons. Despite being 33, Jamieson made a return to VFL football in 1921 and participated in his fourth and final Grand Final, a narrow loss to Richmond. At the start of the 1922 season Jamieson was appointed captain of Carlton, but due to injury had to resign partway through the year.

After football, he was the proprietor of The Clare Castle Hotel in Rathdowne street, Carlton until 1936.
