= Les White =

Australian rules footballer

Personal information
- Full name: James Leslie White
- Born: 9 September 1890; Hawthorn, Victoria
- Died: 27 April 1927 (aged 36); Brunswick, Victoria
- Original team: Hawthorn Rovers
- Height: 171 cm (5 ft 7 in)
- Weight: 61 kg (134 lb)
- Position: Defender

Playing career^{1}
Years	Club	Games (Goals)
1910–15	Essendon	75 (1)
1920	St Kilda	2 (0)
Total		77 (1)
- ^{1} Playing statistics correct to the end of 1920.

James Leslie White (9 September 1890 – 27 April 1927) was an Australian rules footballer who played for Essendon and St Kilda in the Victorian Football League (VFL).

White, from the Hawthorn Rovers originally, was predominantly a defender but could also play as a centreman. Injury caused him to miss Essendon's 1911 premiership but he was on a halfback flank when they claimed back-to-back premierships the following season.

He died of pneumonia on 27 April 1927, aged 36.
