= Fred Kirkwood =

Australian rules footballer

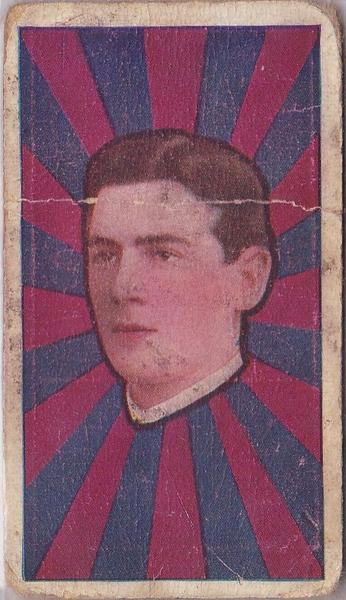
- Cigarette card of Kirkwood in 1911

Personal information
- Full name: Frederick James Kirkwood
- Born: 31 July 1890; Warrnambool
- Died: 18 August 1956 (aged 66); Lang Lang, Victoria
- Original team: Surrey Hills
- Height: 180 cm (5 ft 11 in)
- Weight: 70 kg (154 lb)
- Positions: Half-forward, Wingman

Playing career^{1}
Years	Club	Games (Goals)
1910–11	Fitzroy	18 (7)
1912–14	Essendon	42 (8)
Total		60 (15)
- ^{1} Playing statistics correct to the end of 1914.

Frederick James Kirkwood (31 July 1890 – 18 August 1956) was an Australian rules footballer who played for Fitzroy and Essendon in the Victorian Football League (VFL).

From Surrey Hills, Kirkwood was a wingman in Essendon's 1912 premiership team, having spent the previous two seasons at Fitzroy. His final season in 1914 was marred by a four-game suspension for using "insulting language" at an umpire. Kirkwood later served in World War I.
