= Fred Carpenter =

Australian rules footballer

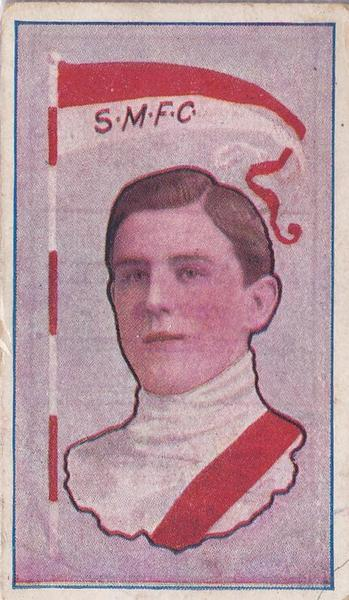
- Cigarette card of Carpenter in 1912

Personal information
- Full name: Frederick Carpenter
- Born: 2 April 1892; Williamstown, Victoria
- Died: 14 March 1976 (aged 83); Port Melbourne, Victoria
- Original team: North Melbourne Juniors
- Height: 175 cm (5 ft 9 in)
- Weight: 81 kg (179 lb)
- Position: Rover

Playing career^{1}
Years	Club	Games (Goals)
1910–13, 1919–20	South Melbourne	52 (68)
- ^{1} Playing statistics correct to the end of 1920.

Fred Carpenter (2 April 1892 – 14 March 1976) was an Australian rules footballer who played with South Melbourne in the Victorian Football League (VFL). He commenced his football career with Yarraville at the age of 15 and then played with Williamstown in the VFA in 1907 before transferring to North Melbourne Juniors. From there he was recruited by South Melbourne where he played from 1910-13. He then played with North Melbourne's VFA side before crossing back to Williamstown Juniors during the First World War recess, where he was captain-coach in 1918 and guided them to the grand final, which was lost by 16 points. After the recess he went back to South Melbourne for the 1919 season and part of 1920 before returning to Williamstown. He played with the Villagers until the end of 1924 and was captain-coach in his last season, which ended in a catastrophic grand final defeat to Footscray. He played 108 games for Williamstown and kicked 235 goals, including the 1921 premiership and the 1924 grand final. He was the Club's leading goalscorer in 1923 and runner-up in the VFA goalkicking with 63 majors, the equal highest in the Club's history with Jim McAuliffe who booted the same number in 1921. He was also the Club's leading goalscorer in 1924 with 35 goals. He bought a business in Port Melbourne and transferred there as captain coach in 1925 and 1926 and continued on as a player from 1927-29. He was the oldest player in the VFA in 1929 at 39 years of age.
