= Vernon Hazel =

Australian rules footballer (1889–1967)

Personal information
- Full name: Vernon Percy Hazewinkel
- Born: 28 October 1889; Prahran, Victoria
- Died: 18 April 1967 (aged 77); Richmond, Victoria
- Original team: Coburg (VFA)

Playing career^{1}
Years	Club	Games (Goals)
1909–10	St Kilda	3 (0)
1910	Melbourne	4 (4)
1911–12	Essendon	12 (4)
Total		19 (8)
- ^{1} Playing statistics correct to the end of 1912.

Vernon Hazel (28 October 1889 – 18 April 1967) was an Australian rules footballer who played for St Kilda, Melbourne and Essendon in the Victorian Football League (VFL).

== Family ==
The son of Pieter Jan (a.k.a. Peter John) Hazewinkel (-1923), and Louisa Wilhemina Hazewinkel (-1917), née von Weihen, Vernon Percy Hazewinkel was born in Prahran on 28 October 1889. He married Margaret Hazel Sindrey (1894–1977) in 1917.

== Football ==
Hazel was recruited from Victorian Football Association (VFA) club Coburg and in one and a half seasons at St Kilda managed just three appearances. In 1910, he crossed to Melbourne and the following season he joined his third club, Essendon. He was the beneficiary of an injury to Allan Belcher in the finals series and lined up as a back pocket in the 1911 Grand Final win. Also used at half forward, Hazel finished his career back in the Victorian Football Association (VFA) with Brighton.

== Boxing ==
In 1916 Hazel was the amateur welterweight champion of Victoria, he entered the professional ranks in September of that year.
