= Alan O'Donoghue =

Australian rules footballer

Personal information
- Full name: Denis Aloysius O'Donoghue
- Born: 3 June 1891; Blackwood, Victoria
- Died: 10 February 1959 (aged 67); Heidelberg, Victoria
- Original team: Leopold
- Height: 183 cm (6 ft 0 in)
- Weight: 78 kg (172 lb)

Playing career^{1}
Years	Club	Games (Goals)
1912	Richmond	9 (7)
1914–1918	South Melbourne	44 (15)
Total		53 (22)
- ^{1} Playing statistics correct to the end of 1918.

Denis Aloysius "Alan" O'Donognue (3 June 1891 – 10 February 1959) was an Australian rules footballer who played for Richmond and South Melbourne in the VFL.

O'Donognue was both a follower and key position player. He started his career at Richmond but only managed the one season and in 1914 made his debut for South Melbourne. In that year's Grand Final he played as a centre half forward in their losing side. He was a member of South Melbourne's 1918 premiership team though, in what would be his last game of league football he was a centre half back in their five-point win over Collingwood.
