= Dick Mullaly =

Australian rules footballer

Personal information
- Full name: Richard Thomas Mullaly
- Born: 19 June 1892; Port Melbourne, Victoria
- Died: 11 June 1971 (aged 78); Prahran, Victoria
- Original team: Leopold
- Height: 178 cm (5 ft 10 in)
- Weight: 71 kg (157 lb)

Playing career^{1}
Years	Club	Games (Goals)
1912–1917	South Melbourne	69 (12)
- ^{1} Playing statistics correct to the end of 1917.

Richard Thomas Mullaly (19 June 1892 – 11 June 1971) was an Australian rules footballer who played with South Melbourne in the Victorian Football League (VFL).

== Family ==
The son of William Patrick Mullaly (-1936), and Emma Mullaly, née Dillon, he was born on 19 June 1892. He married Gertrude Sarah Black (1893-1919) in 1916. They had a daughter, Catherine Marie (1918-).

He married, for a second time, on 28 November 1925. His second wife was Anne Elizabeth Finn (1900–1990). Their son, Paul Richard Mullaly, Q.C., B.A., LL.B,. Dip.Theol., was a judge of the Victorian County Court from 1979 to 2001.

== Football ==
Recruited locally from Leopold, Mullaly played mainly as a centreman during his time at South Melbourne. He participated in South Melbourne's 1912 and 1914 VFL Grand Final losses.

Mullaly continued to serve South Melbourne after his retirement in the role of club secretary, a position he held for 12 years — with the collection of players recruited from interstate in 1932/1933 becoming known as South Melbourne's "Foreign Legion". He was awarded life membership in 1940.

He was also a selector for the Victorian interstate team and helped pick the side which competed in the 1933 Sydney Carnival.

== Death ==
Dick Mullaly died on 11 June 1971.
