= Jack O'Brien (footballer, born 1887) =

Australian rules footballer

Personal information
- Full name: Jack O'Brien
- Born: 25 September 1887
- Died: 8 March 1959 (aged 71)
- Original team: South Ballarat
- Height: 184 cm (6 ft 0 in)
- Weight: 85 kg (187 lb)

Playing career^{1}
Years	Club	Games (Goals)
1912–13	Essendon	15 (1)
1917–18	Fitzroy	6 (1)
Total		21 (2)
- ^{1} Playing statistics correct to the end of 1918.

Jack O'Brien (25 September 1887 – 8 March 1959) was an Australian rules footballer who played for Essendon and Fitzroy in the Victorian Football League (VFL).

A premiership player in his debut season, O'Brien played from the back pocket in Essendon's 1912 VFL Grand Final triumph. He was also used as a follower and returned to his original club South Ballarat for the second half of the 1913 season. After playing at Fitzroy in 1917 and 1918, O'Brien crossed to Northcote in 1919.
