= Ray Gibb =

Australian rules footballer

Personal information
- Full name: Ray Gibb
- Born: 5 December 1928
- Died: 10 September 1953 (aged 24); Fitzroy, Victoria
- Original team: Balwyn Amateurs
- Height: 188 cm (6 ft 2 in)
- Weight: 81 kg (179 lb)
- Position: Utility

Playing career^{1}
Years	Club	Games (Goals)
1950–1952	Hawthorn	22 (3)
1952–1953	Richmond	6 (1)
Total		28 (4)
- ^{1} Playing statistics correct to the end of 1953.

Ray Gibb (5 December 1928 – 10 September 1953) was an Australian rules footballer who played with Hawthorn and Richmond in the Victorian Football League (VFL).

Gibb, a utility player, was the son of former Melbourne and Collingwood footballer Reg Gibb. He was used as a fullback for much of his league career.

Originally from Balwyn Amateurs, Gibbs made five appearances for Hawthorn in the 1950 VFL season before suffering a hand injury which kept him out for the rest of the year. He had to have one of his nails removed by a doctor.

He was a regular fixture in the side throughout 1951, playing 16 of a possible 18 games.

Gibb appeared in the opening round of the 1952 season with Hawthorn, but it would be his final game for the club. He was given permission to train at Richmond and was selected in their senior side for their round 15 encounter with South Melbourne, one of five games he played for them that season.

Having played just once for Richmond in 1953, Gibb applied for and was granted a clearance to Box Hill in June.

Three months later he was involved in a road accident when his motor cycle crashed into a milk cart in Vermont. He died from his injuries the following day, at St Vincent's Hospital. A benefit game to raise money for his family was played later that month between a combined Richmond–Hawthorn team, and a Box Hill team augmented with other VFL and VFA star players.
