= Dick Monteith (footballer) =

Australian rules footballer

Personal information
- Full name: Richard Hayes Monteith
- Born: 20 July 1887; Williamstown, Victoria
- Died: 27 October 1959 (aged 72); Launceston, Tasmania
- Original team: Northcote

Playing career^{1}
| Years | Club | Games (Goals) |
| 1909 | Northcote (VFA) | 6 (0) |
| 1910–1912 | Essendon | 20 (0) |
| 1912 | Brighton (VFA) | 2 (0) |
- ^{1} Playing statistics correct to the end of 1912.

Richard Hayes Monteith (20 July 1887 – 27 October 1959) was an Australian rules footballer who played with Essendon in the Victorian Football League (VFL).

Monteith was a half back flanker in Essendon's 1911 premiership team. Essendon were premiers again in 1912, but Monteith left the club after two games that year, to join Brighton.
