= Eddie Thomas (Australian footballer) =

Australian rules footballer

Personal information
- Full name: Edward Rupert Lavender Thomas
- Born: 24 June 1891; Kapunda, South Australia
- Died: 16 January 1953 (aged 61); Preston West, Victoria
- Original team: Preston District
- Height: 175 cm (5 ft 9 in)
- Weight: 77 kg (170 lb)

Playing career^{1}
Years	Club	Games (Goals)
1911	Collingwood	7 (1)
- ^{1} Playing statistics correct to the end of 1911.

Edward Rupert Lavender Thomas (24 June 1891 – 16 January 1953) was an Australian rules footballer who played with Collingwood in the Victorian Football League (VFL).
