= Ben Hair =

Australian rules footballer

Personal information
- Full name: Bennett Gluyas Hair
- Born: 29 September 1892; Port Melbourne, Victoria
- Died: 1 October 1974 (aged 82); Mentone, Victoria
- Original team: Brighton Juniors
- Height: 178 cm (5 ft 10 in)
- Weight: 79 kg (174 lb)

Playing career^{1}
Years	Club	Games (Goals)
1914–1915, 1917–1918	South Melbourne	43 (3)
1919	St Kilda	6 (3)
Total		49 (6)
- ^{1} Playing statistics correct to the end of 1919.

Bennett Gluyas Hair (29 September 1892 – 1 October 1974) was an Australian rules footballer who played for the South Melbourne Football Club and St Kilda Football Club in the Victorian Football League (VFL).
