= Jack Walsh (Australian footballer) =

Australian rules footballer

Personal information
- Full name: John Patrick Walsh
- Born: 21 August 1892; Albert Park, Victoria
- Died: 18 September 1915 (aged 23); Tarilta, Victoria
- Original team: Pembroke
- Height: 173 cm (5 ft 8 in)
- Weight: 76 kg (168 lb)

Playing career^{1}
Years	Club	Games (Goals)
1910–12	South Melbourne	29 (0)
- ^{1} Playing statistics correct to the end of 1912.

John Patrick Walsh (21 August 1892 – 18 September 1915) was an Australian rules footballer who played with South Melbourne in the Victorian Football League (VFL).

== Death ==
He had been suffering from ill-health for some time, and he died at his uncle's residence at Tarilta, Victoria, on 18 September 1915, aged 23.
