= Joe Prince =

Australian rules footballer

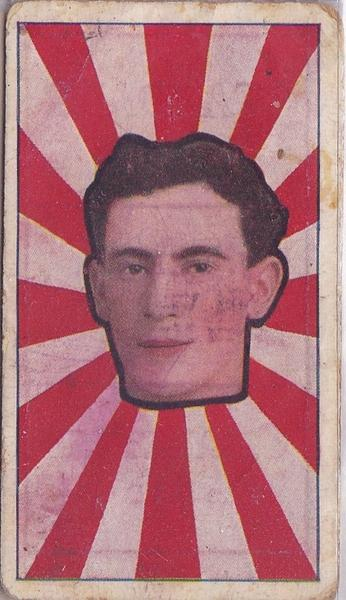
- Cigarette card on Prince in 1911

Personal information
- Full name: Joseph Henry Prince
- Born: 30 September 1885; Avenel, Victoria
- Died: 7 November 1970 (aged 85); Brunswick East, Victoria
- Original team: Preston (VFA)
- Height: 164 cm (5 ft 5 in)
- Weight: 62 kg (137 lb)
- Position: Wingman

Playing career^{1}
Years	Club	Games (Goals)
1908–09	St Kilda	2 (1)
1910–15, 1917–18	South Melbourne	103 (5)
1919	Carlton	10 (1)
Total		115 (7)
- ^{1} Playing statistics correct to the end of 1919.

Joseph Henry Prince (30 September 1885 – 7 November 1970) was an Australian rules footballer who played for St Kilda, South Melbourne and Carlton in the Victorian Football League (VFL).

St Kilda recruited Prince from Preston but he failed to make an impact in his two seasons and returned to the VFA club during the 1909 football season. He got another opportunity at South Melbourne and had much more success, playing regularly as a wingman and appearing in their 1912 and 1914 losing Grand Finals. They were eventually premiers in 1918, Prince's last season, but he wasn't a member of the side, having only managed two appearances that year. He finished his career at Carlton, where he added a further ten matches.
