= George McLeod (footballer, born 1879) =

Australian rules footballer

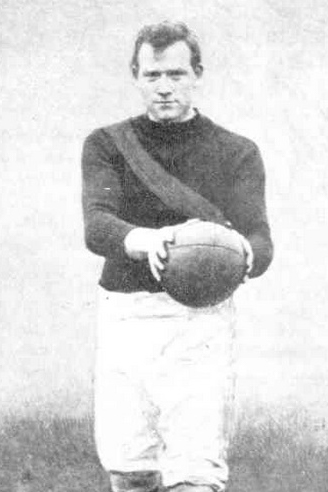
- McLeod in 1910

Personal information
- Born: 22 August 1879
- Died: 3 March 1959 (aged 79)
- Original team: South Yarra
- Debut: Round 4, 1897, St Kilda vs. Melbourne, at the MCG
- Height: 173 cm (5 ft 8 in)
- Weight: 83 kg (183 lb)

Playing career^{1}
Years	Club	Games (Goals)
1897, 1901–02	St Kilda	12 (1)
1910–13	Essendon	56 (5)
Total		68 (6)
- ^{1} Playing statistics correct to the end of 1913.

George McLeod (22 August 1879 – 3 March 1959) was an Australian rules footballer who played for St Kilda and Essendon during the early years of the Victorian Football League (VFL).

McLeod, originally from South Yarra, started his VFL career at St Kilda in 1897. He left the club at the end of the season but returned for another stint in 1901. Before arriving at Essendon in 1910, McLeod played football for the Railway club (Lyell District Football Association) in Tasmania. He represented the state at the 1908 Melbourne Carnival and that year also won the LDFA "best all round player" award. He was a follower in Essendon's 1911 premiership team in place of captain Allan Belcher who was injured and a back pocket in their premiership the following season.

== See also ==
- 1908 Melbourne Carnival
