= Dan Hanley (footballer) =

Australian rules footballer

Personal information
- Full name: Daniel Hanley
- Born: 17 May 1883; Allendale, Victoria
- Died: 1 December 1976 (aged 93); Macleod, Victoria
- Original teams: South Ballarat, Golden Point
- Height: 185 cm (6 ft 1 in)
- Weight: 83 kg (183 lb)
- Positions: Half back, ruck

Playing career^{1}
Years	Club	Games (Goals)
1911–1914	Essendon	67 (9)
- ^{1} Playing statistics correct to the end of 1914.

Daniel Hanley (17 May 1883 – 1 December 1976) was an Australian rules footballer who played with Essendon in the Victorian Football League (VFL).

Before he came to Essendon, Hanley played his football at South Ballarat. He was used mostly as a defender during his VFL career but also spent some time as a follower. A premiership player in both 1911 and 1912, he remained with Essendon until the conclusion of the 1914 season when he was suspended for eight matches in the penultimate game of the year. He did not return the following season and instead joined the army with whom he served overseas.

Hanley was involved in a controversial incident in 1912 when he alleged that he had been deliberately impeded by a boundary umpire. His allegation was that when he was on the boundary line competing against a Collingwood player for the ball, the umpire grasped him by the hand, thus preventing him from taking part in the contest. The umpire was not punished due to a lack of witnesses.
