= 1913 VFL season =

17th season of the Victorian Football League (VFL)

1913 VFL premiership season
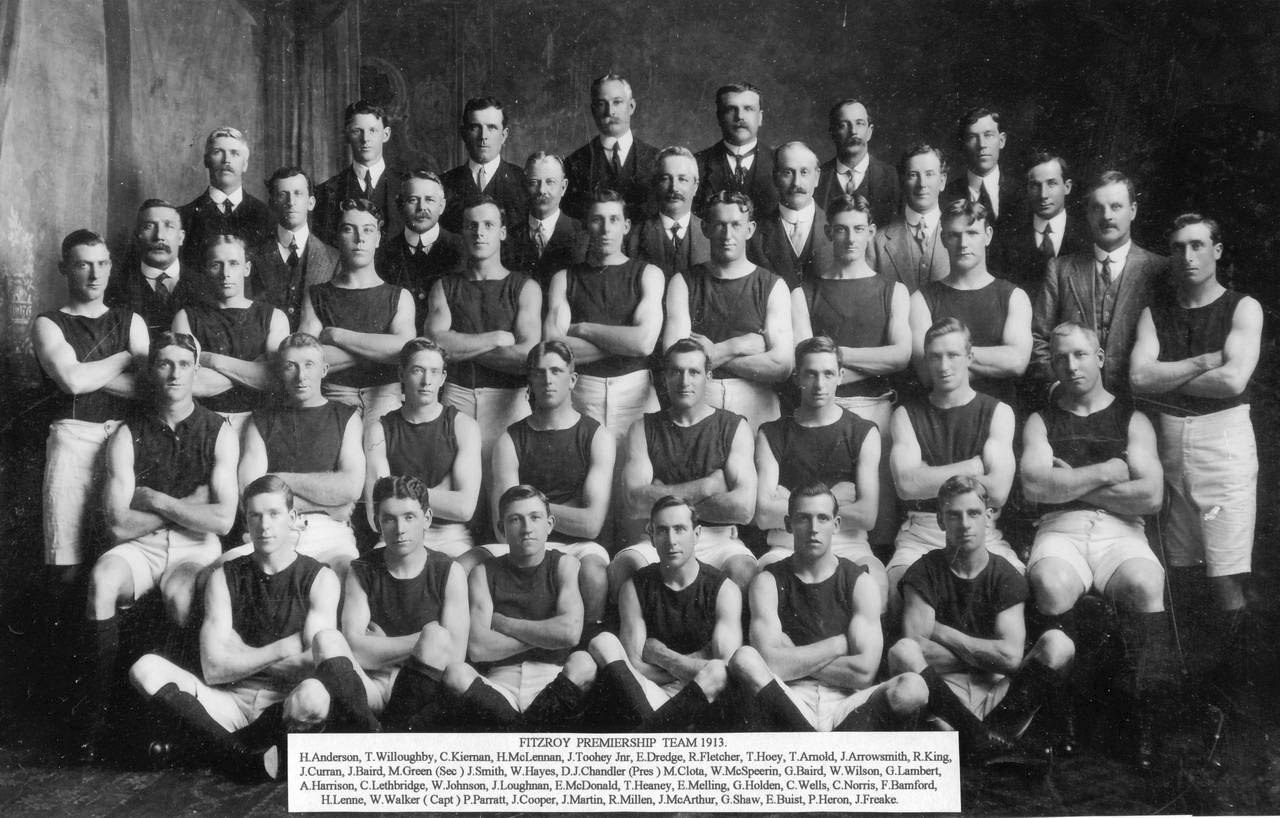
- Fitzroy 1913 VFL premiership team
- Date: 26 April – 27 September 1913
- Teams: 10
- Premiers: Fitzroy; 5th premiership
- Minor premiers: Fitzroy; 4th minor premiership
- Leading goalkicker medallist: Roy Park (University); 53 goals
- Matches played: 94

The 1913 VFL season was the 17th season of the Victorian Football League (VFL), the highest-level senior Australian rules football competition in Victoria. The season featured ten clubs and ran from 26 April to 27 September, comprising an 18-match home-and-away season followed by a four-week finals series featuring the top four clubs.

Fitzroy won the premiership, defeating St Kilda by 13 points in the 1913 VFL grand final; it was Fitzroy's fifth VFL premiership. Fitzroy also won the minor premiership by finishing atop the home-and-away ladder with a 16–2 win–loss record. University's Roy Park won the leading goalkicker medal as the league's leading goalkicker.

== Background ==
In 1913, the VFL competition consisted of ten teams of 18 on-the-field players each, with no "reserves", although any of the 18 players who had left the playing field for any reason could later resume their place on the field at any time during the match.

Each team played each other twice in a home-and-away season of 18 rounds.

Once the 18 round home-and-away season had finished, the 1913 VFL Premiers were determined by the specific format and conventions of the amended "Argus system".

== Home-and-away season ==
=== Round 1 ===
| Home team | Home team score | Away team | Away team score | Venue | Date |
|---|---|---|---|---|---|
| Geelong | 7.13 (55) | Richmond | 5.7 (37) | Corio Oval | 26 April 1913 |
| Fitzroy | 10.19 (79) | University | 5.7 (37) | Brunswick Street Oval | 26 April 1913 |
| South Melbourne | 8.15 (63) | St Kilda | 8.6 (54) | Lake Oval | 26 April 1913 |
| Melbourne | 5.7 (37) | Collingwood | 8.12 (60) | MCG | 26 April 1913 |
| Essendon | 9.13 (67) | Carlton | 11.17 (83) | EMCG | 26 April 1913 |

=== Round 2 ===
| Home team | Home team score | Away team | Away team score | Venue | Date |
|---|---|---|---|---|---|
| Collingwood | 10.17 (77) | Geelong | 11.2 (68) | Victoria Park | 3 May 1913 |
| Carlton | 8.13 (61) | South Melbourne | 9.7 (61) | Princes Park | 3 May 1913 |
| University | 10.12 (72) | Melbourne | 14.15 (99) | MCG | 3 May 1913 |
| St Kilda | 10.7 (67) | Fitzroy | 3.16 (34) | Junction Oval | 3 May 1913 |
| Richmond | 11.12 (78) | Essendon | 13.11 (89) | Punt Road Oval | 3 May 1913 |

=== Round 3 ===
| Home team | Home team score | Away team | Away team score | Venue | Date |
|---|---|---|---|---|---|
| Fitzroy | 8.14 (62) | Geelong | 6.7 (43) | Brunswick Street Oval | 10 May 1913 |
| Carlton | 11.13 (79) | Melbourne | 7.11 (53) | Princes Park | 10 May 1913 |
| University | 9.11 (65) | St Kilda | 10.13 (73) | MCG | 10 May 1913 |
| South Melbourne | 8.9 (57) | Richmond | 9.2 (56) | Lake Oval | 10 May 1913 |
| Essendon | 10.5 (65) | Collingwood | 10.10 (70) | EMCG | 10 May 1913 |

=== Round 4 ===
| Home team | Home team score | Away team | Away team score | Venue | Date |
|---|---|---|---|---|---|
| Richmond | 9.14 (68) | St Kilda | 7.12 (54) | Punt Road Oval | 17 May 1913 |
| Geelong | 14.14 (98) | University | 7.9 (51) | Corio Oval | 17 May 1913 |
| Essendon | 7.14 (56) | South Melbourne | 15.13 (103) | EMCG | 17 May 1913 |
| Melbourne | 4.7 (31) | Fitzroy | 7.11 (53) | MCG | 17 May 1913 |
| Collingwood | 6.8 (44) | Carlton | 5.8 (38) | Victoria Park | 17 May 1913 |

=== Round 5 ===
| Home team | Home team score | Away team | Away team score | Venue | Date |
|---|---|---|---|---|---|
| Geelong | 7.15 (57) | South Melbourne | 9.17 (71) | Corio Oval | 24 May 1913 |
| Collingwood | 9.16 (70) | Richmond | 6.12 (48) | Victoria Park | 24 May 1913 |
| St Kilda | 8.13 (61) | Melbourne | 7.14 (56) | Junction Oval | 24 May 1913 |
| Fitzroy | 7.9 (51) | Essendon | 5.6 (36) | Brunswick Street Oval | 24 May 1913 |
| University | 8.8 (56) | Carlton | 10.12 (72) | MCG | 24 May 1913 |

=== Round 6 ===
| Home team | Home team score | Away team | Away team score | Venue | Date |
|---|---|---|---|---|---|
| Fitzroy | 6.7 (43) | Richmond | 5.6 (36) | Brunswick Street Oval | 31 May 1913 |
| Essendon | 3.5 (23) | Geelong | 6.11 (47) | EMCG | 31 May 1913 |
| Carlton | 4.13 (37) | St Kilda | 3.6 (24) | Princes Park | 31 May 1913 |
| South Melbourne | 6.16 (52) | Melbourne | 4.4 (28) | Lake Oval | 31 May 1913 |
| University | 2.8 (20) | Collingwood | 7.12 (54) | MCG | 31 May 1913 |

=== Round 7 ===
| Home team | Home team score | Away team | Away team score | Venue | Date |
|---|---|---|---|---|---|
| Essendon | 14.22 (106) | University | 6.5 (41) | EMCG | 7 June 1913 |
| Collingwood | 13.11 (89) | St Kilda | 7.12 (54) | Victoria Park | 7 June 1913 |
| Melbourne | 7.10 (52) | Geelong | 12.12 (84) | MCG | 7 June 1913 |
| South Melbourne | 7.8 (50) | Fitzroy | 11.17 (83) | Lake Oval | 7 June 1913 |
| Richmond | 8.13 (61) | Carlton | 10.7 (67) | Punt Road Oval | 7 June 1913 |

=== Round 8 ===
| Home team | Home team score | Away team | Away team score | Venue | Date |
|---|---|---|---|---|---|
| Collingwood | 5.7 (37) | Fitzroy | 6.11 (47) | Victoria Park | 9 June 1913 |
| University | 10.9 (69) | South Melbourne | 13.12 (90) | MCG | 9 June 1913 |
| Richmond | 7.10 (52) | Melbourne | 5.10 (40) | Punt Road Oval | 9 June 1913 |
| St Kilda | 9.11 (65) | Essendon | 7.13 (55) | Junction Oval | 9 June 1913 |
| Geelong | 7.12 (54) | Carlton | 9.15 (69) | Corio Oval | 9 June 1913 |

=== Round 9 ===
| Home team | Home team score | Away team | Away team score | Venue | Date |
|---|---|---|---|---|---|
| Essendon | 9.17 (71) | Melbourne | 3.12 (30) | EMCG | 14 June 1913 |
| University | 5.10 (40) | Richmond | 12.11 (83) | MCG | 14 June 1913 |
| St Kilda | 11.12 (78) | Geelong | 10.11 (71) | Junction Oval | 14 June 1913 |
| South Melbourne | 10.15 (75) | Collingwood | 7.9 (51) | Lake Oval | 14 June 1913 |
| Fitzroy | 14.15 (99) | Carlton | 9.10 (64) | Brunswick Street Oval | 14 June 1913 |

=== Round 10 ===
| Home team | Home team score | Away team | Away team score | Venue | Date |
|---|---|---|---|---|---|
| St Kilda | 9.11 (65) | South Melbourne | 13.14 (92) | Junction Oval | 21 June 1913 |
| Collingwood | 14.11 (95) | Melbourne | 6.11 (47) | Victoria Park | 21 June 1913 |
| Carlton | 15.15 (105) | Essendon | 11.12 (78) | Princes Park | 21 June 1913 |
| Richmond | 12.9 (81) | Geelong | 8.15 (63) | Punt Road Oval | 21 June 1913 |
| University | 5.5 (35) | Fitzroy | 10.15 (75) | MCG | 21 June 1913 |

=== Round 11 ===
| Home team | Home team score | Away team | Away team score | Venue | Date |
|---|---|---|---|---|---|
| Melbourne | 7.20 (62) | University | 7.11 (53) | MCG | 28 June 1913 |
| Fitzroy | 7.11 (53) | St Kilda | 5.9 (39) | Brunswick Street Oval | 28 June 1913 |
| Essendon | 8.9 (57) | Richmond | 10.7 (67) | EMCG | 28 June 1913 |
| Geelong | 8.12 (60) | Collingwood | 11.5 (71) | Corio Oval | 28 June 1913 |
| South Melbourne | 12.16 (88) | Carlton | 5.11 (41) | Lake Oval | 28 June 1913 |

=== Round 12 ===
| Home team | Home team score | Away team | Away team score | Venue | Date |
|---|---|---|---|---|---|
| St Kilda | 18.20 (128) | University | 7.14 (56) | Junction Oval | 5 July 1913 |
| Richmond | 3.17 (35) | South Melbourne | 8.11 (59) | Punt Road Oval | 5 July 1913 |
| Collingwood | 10.12 (72) | Essendon | 7.12 (54) | Victoria Park | 5 July 1913 |
| Geelong | 11.12 (78) | Fitzroy | 8.13 (61) | Corio Oval | 5 July 1913 |
| Melbourne | 10.7 (67) | Carlton | 7.12 (54) | MCG | 5 July 1913 |

=== Round 13 ===
| Home team | Home team score | Away team | Away team score | Venue | Date |
|---|---|---|---|---|---|
| Fitzroy | 12.14 (86) | Melbourne | 3.10 (28) | Brunswick Street Oval | 19 July 1913 |
| Carlton | 6.18 (54) | Collingwood | 11.11 (77) | Princes Park | 19 July 1913 |
| St Kilda | 9.8 (62) | Richmond | 5.6 (36) | Junction Oval | 19 July 1913 |
| University | 5.6 (36) | Geelong | 17.18 (120) | MCG | 19 July 1913 |
| South Melbourne | 5.12 (42) | Essendon | 7.20 (62) | Lake Oval | 19 July 1913 |

=== Round 14 ===
| Home team | Home team score | Away team | Away team score | Venue | Date |
|---|---|---|---|---|---|
| Melbourne | 5.5 (35) | St Kilda | 9.17 (71) | MCG | 26 July 1913 |
| Essendon | 4.12 (36) | Fitzroy | 7.12 (54) | EMCG | 26 July 1913 |
| Carlton | 9.22 (76) | University | 3.8 (26) | Princes Park | 26 July 1913 |
| South Melbourne | 12.10 (82) | Geelong | 9.12 (66) | Lake Oval | 26 July 1913 |
| Richmond | 5.15 (45) | Collingwood | 10.9 (69) | Punt Road Oval | 26 July 1913 |

=== Round 15 ===
| Home team | Home team score | Away team | Away team score | Venue | Date |
|---|---|---|---|---|---|
| Melbourne | 2.7 (19) | South Melbourne | 5.18 (48) | MCG | 2 August 1913 |
| Collingwood | 12.15 (87) | University | 10.10 (70) | Victoria Park | 2 August 1913 |
| Richmond | 6.10 (46) | Fitzroy | 11.13 (79) | Punt Road Oval | 2 August 1913 |
| Geelong | 11.10 (76) | Essendon | 8.5 (53) | Corio Oval | 2 August 1913 |
| St Kilda | 10.10 (70) | Carlton | 11.3 (69) | Junction Oval | 2 August 1913 |

=== Round 16 ===
| Home team | Home team score | Away team | Away team score | Venue | Date |
|---|---|---|---|---|---|
| Geelong | 4.23 (47) | Melbourne | 4.2 (26) | Corio Oval | 9 August 1913 |
| Fitzroy | 8.11 (59) | South Melbourne | 7.14 (56) | Brunswick Street Oval | 9 August 1913 |
| Carlton | 9.9 (63) | Richmond | 7.9 (51) | Princes Park | 9 August 1913 |
| University | 8.12 (60) | Essendon | 9.8 (62) | MCG | 9 August 1913 |
| St Kilda | 12.10 (82) | Collingwood | 6.8 (44) | Junction Oval | 9 August 1913 |

=== Round 17 ===
| Home team | Home team score | Away team | Away team score | Venue | Date |
|---|---|---|---|---|---|
| South Melbourne | 17.9 (111) | University | 8.13 (61) | Lake Oval | 23 August 1913 |
| Essendon | 7.8 (50) | St Kilda | 9.8 (62) | EMCG | 23 August 1913 |
| Carlton | 6.10 (46) | Geelong | 9.15 (69) | Princes Park | 23 August 1913 |
| Melbourne | 9.10 (64) | Richmond | 8.5 (53) | Punt Road Oval | 23 August 1913 |
| Fitzroy | 9.10 (64) | Collingwood | 4.13 (37) | Brunswick Street Oval | 23 August 1913 |

=== Round 18 ===
| Home team | Home team score | Away team | Away team score | Venue | Date |
|---|---|---|---|---|---|
| Richmond | 15.11 (101) | University | 8.11 (59) | Punt Road Oval | 30 August 1913 |
| Geelong | 15.18 (108) | St Kilda | 5.10 (40) | Corio Oval | 30 August 1913 |
| Collingwood | 7.12 (54) | South Melbourne | 8.8 (56) | Victoria Park | 30 August 1913 |
| Carlton | 4.8 (32) | Fitzroy | 7.13 (55) | Princes Park | 30 August 1913 |
| Melbourne | 6.6 (42) | Essendon | 6.16 (52) | MCG | 30 August 1913 |

== Ladder ==
| (P) | Premiers |
| | Qualified for finals |

| # | Team | P | W | L | D | PF | PA | % | Pts |
|---|---|---|---|---|---|---|---|---|---|
| 1 | Fitzroy (P) | 18 | 16 | 2 | 0 | 1137 | 788 | 144.3 | 64 |
| 2 | South Melbourne | 18 | 14 | 3 | 1 | 1256 | 977 | 128.6 | 58 |
| 3 | Collingwood | 18 | 13 | 5 | 0 | 1158 | 984 | 117.7 | 52 |
| 4 | St Kilda | 18 | 11 | 7 | 0 | 1149 | 1081 | 106.3 | 44 |
| 5 | Geelong | 18 | 10 | 8 | 0 | 1264 | 1016 | 124.4 | 40 |
| 6 | Carlton | 18 | 9 | 8 | 1 | 1110 | 1100 | 100.9 | 38 |
| 7 | Richmond | 18 | 6 | 12 | 0 | 1034 | 1090 | 94.9 | 24 |
| 8 | Essendon | 18 | 6 | 12 | 0 | 1072 | 1148 | 93.4 | 24 |
| 9 | Melbourne | 18 | 4 | 14 | 0 | 816 | 1143 | 71.4 | 16 |
| 10 | University | 18 | 0 | 18 | 0 | 907 | 1576 | 57.6 | 0 |

Rules for classification: 1. premiership points; 2. percentage; 3. points for
Average score: 60.6
Source: AFL Tables

== Finals series ==
All of the 1913 finals were played at the MCG, so the home team in the semi-finals and preliminary final was the higher ranked team from the ladder but in the grand final the home team was the team that won the preliminary final.

=== Semi-finals ===
| Home team | Score | Away team | Score | Venue | Date |
|---|---|---|---|---|---|
| St Kilda | 12.12 (84) | South Melbourne | 6.15 (51) | MCG | 6 September |
| Fitzroy | 11.14 (80) | Collingwood | 6.7 (43) | MCG | 13 September |

=== Preliminary final ===
| Home team | Score | Away team | Score | Venue | Date |
|---|---|---|---|---|---|
| St Kilda | 10.10 (70) | Fitzroy | 6.9 (45) | MCG | 20 September |

== Season notes ==
- The VFL formed an independent tribunal to hear charges against players.
- Prior to Melbourne's Round 4 match against Fitzroy, six of the club's players went on strike to protest the club committee's failure to support a player charged by police after striking a Carlton player in Round 3. After Melbourne President Dr. William C. McClelland entered the club rooms and personally informed the players they would be expelled from the club if they did not take the field, the players called off their strike.
- In the round 14 match against Fitzroy, controversy erupted after VFL Stewards incorrectly reported Essendon follower Bill Walker.
- University Football Club's full-forward Roy Park, who stood only 5"5" (165 cm), was selected as the Victorian Interstate team's full-forward, and kicked 53 of University's 115 goals for the season. Park was the second player to win the goalkicking when his team won the wooden spoon, after Charlie Baker of St Kilda in 1902, whose team also finished last without a win.

== Awards ==
- The 1913 VFL Premiership team was Fitzroy.
- The VFL's leading goalkicker was Roy Park of University with 53 goals.
- University took the "wooden spoon" in 1913.

== Sources ==
- 1913 VFL season at AFL Tables
- 1913 VFL season at Australian Football
