= 1908 VFL grand final =

Grand final of the 1908 Victorian Football League season

Carlton	Essendon
5.5 (35)	3.8 (26)
	1	2	3	4
CAR	2.3 (15)	5.4 (34)	5.5 (35)	5.5 (35)
ESS	1.1 (7)	2.4 (16)	3.5 (23)	3.8 (26)
- Date: 26 September 1908
- Stadium: Melbourne Cricket Ground
- Attendance: 50,261
- Umpires: Jack Elder

The 1908 VFL Grand Final was an Australian rules football game contested between the Carlton Football Club and Essendon Football Club, held at the Melbourne Cricket Ground in Melbourne on 26 September 1908. It was the 11th annual Grand Final of the Victorian Football League, staged to determine the premiers for the 1908 VFL season. The match, attended by 50,261 spectators, was won by reigning premiers Carlton by a margin of 9 points, marking that club's third premiership victory and third in succession.

== Right to challenge ==
This season was played under the amended Argus system. Carlton was the minor premier, and Essendon had finished second. The teams both qualified for this match by winning their semi-finals matches.

If Essendon had won this match, Carlton would have had the right to challenge Essendon to a rematch for the premiership on the following weekend, because Carlton was the minor premier. The winner of that match would then have won the premiership.

== Teams ==
Carlton	Essendon

Carlton
B:	Norm Clark	Les Beck	Arthur Ford
HB:	Jim Flynn	Billy Payne	Fred Jinks
C:	George Bruce	Rod McGregor	Ted Kennedy
HF:	Alex Lang	Jim Marchbank	Martin Gotz
F:	Harvey Kelly	Vin Gardiner	George Topping
Foll:	George Johnson	Charlie Hammond	Fred Elliott (c)
Coach:	Jack Worrall		

Essendon
B:	Len Bowe	Billy Griffith (c)	Bert Daykin
HB:	Mark Shea	Bill Busbridge	Bill Johnson
C:	Bill Davies	Bill Sewart	Les Minto
HF:	Paddy Shea	Dave Smith	Harry Prout
F:	Bill Heaphy	Harry Farnsworth	Arthur Legge
Foll:	Allan Belcher	Jim Martin	Ernie Cameron
Coach:	Dave Smith		

- Umpire – Jack Elder

== Statistics ==
=== Goalkickers ===
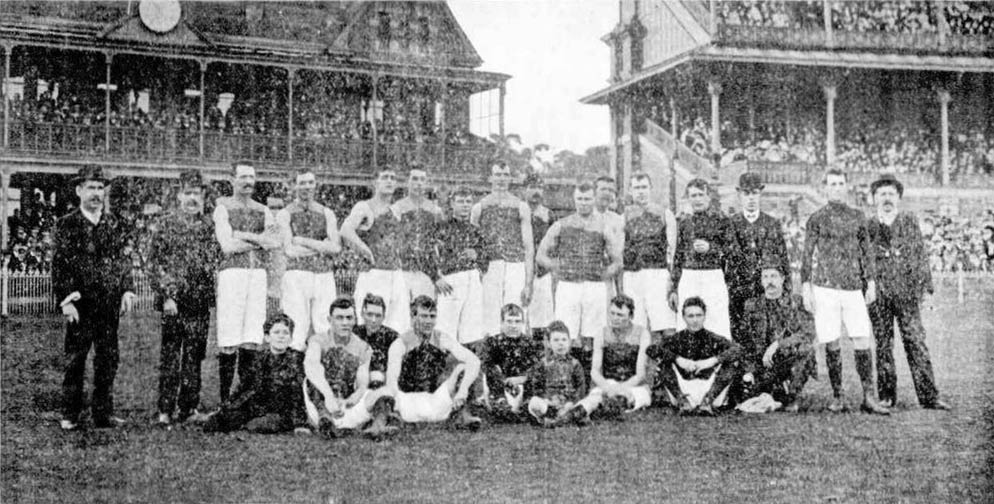
Carlton FC, 1908 Premier team

Carlton:

- Elliott 1
- Gotz 1
- Kelly 1
- Kennedy 1
- Marchbank 1

Essendon:

- Legge 1
- Martin 1
- P.Shea 1

=== Attendance ===
- MCG crowd – 50,261

== See also ==
- 1908 VFL season
