= Harry Prout =

Australian rules footballer

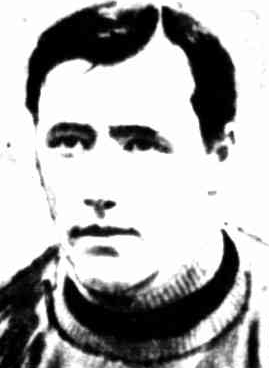

Personal information
- Full name: John Henry Prout
- Born: 27 April 1887; Clunes, Victoria
- Died: 13 January 1956 (aged 68); Bondi, New South Wales
- Original team: Collegians
- Height: 165 cm (5 ft 5 in)
- Position: Forward / wingman

Playing career^{1}
Years	Club	Games (Goals)
1908–1910	Essendon	29 (35)
- ^{1} Playing statistics correct to the end of 1910.

John Henry Prout (27 April 1887 – 13 January 1956) was an Australian rules footballer who played with Essendon in the Victorian Football League (VFL). A former Wesley College captain, Prout played for Essendon from 1908 to 1910. He was involved in a murder trial in 1911 as one of five accused, but was acquitted of the charge against him.

== VFL career ==
Prout, a mechanical student, made football history when he was called up from Collegians to make his league debut in the 1908 VFL Grand Final. Named on a half forward flank, it was the first occasion that a player had debuted in a grand final and has happened only five times since. Essendon lost the match to Carlton by nine points. Prout, who was described in The Age as "the college experiment", was reported to have been ineffective as a forward in the first half of the game. He was moved to a wing where he put in an improved performance and was said to have played great opposed Ted Kennedy.

Before the beginning of the 1909 VFL season, Prout applied for a clearance to join Sturt, an Adelaide-based club. He was living in the district at the time due to his employment, but soon after lost his position and had to return to Melbourne. His application was withdrawn and he instead lined up for Essendon for the opening round of the season. He began well with three goals against St Kilda and remained in the side until Essendon's loss to University in round four, when he fractured his collarbone. This kept him out of the side for six weeks and he was still not fully recovered when he returned in round 11. However he managed to kick a career high five goals against Geelong at Corio Oval the following round. He finished the home and away season with 25 goals and kicked another two in Essendon's semi-final loss. From 13 appearances in 1909, Prout's 27 goals were the second most for his club, behind Paddy Shea.

Prout had an early setback in the 1910 VFL season, reported during the round two win over University. Field umpire R. J. Boyle testified that he saw Prout strike University's Athol Tymms and the tribunal handed down a four-week suspension. Used as a wingman for much of the year, Prout returned in round seven and did not miss another game for the rest of the season, in which he played 15 games. This included another semi-final, which Essendon lost to Collingwood. That loss was his last VFL appearance, meaning he started and ended his career in a final.

== Murder charge ==
Prout was one of five men charged with murder in 1911, over the death of a 26-year-old man named Arthur Ernest Lupton in a work site in Wallan on the early hours of 28 January. The intoxicated men, who were employed on the railway as navvies, were going from tent to tent in the camp premises, looking for a man who went by the name "Killarney", who they had quarrelled with the previous night. Instead it was Lupton that fell victim to the group, struck by one of the men, later dying of a fractured skull. The jury convicted Prout's companion Frederick Carmody of manslaughter, satisfied by the account of a witness who had seen him attack Lupton at his tent. Prout and the other three men were acquitted.

The judge, Justice Hodges, stated before discharging the men:

"I should like to say this, that if the head of the man who was struck had been the head of the man who was known as Killarney every one of you would have been justly convicted of manslaughter of a most aggravated nature, and if the skull of the man who was killed had been of the ordinary thickness of a man's skull, every one of you would have been guilty of murder."

Following the trial, Prout joined NSW Australian Football Association club YMCA for the 1912 season.
