= Arthur Legge =

Arthur Legge may refer to:

- Arthur Legge (British Army officer) (1800–1890), British soldier and politician
- Arthur Legge (footballer) (1881–1941), Australian sportsman
- Sir Arthur Kaye Legge KCB (1766–1835), Royal Navy officer
