= Bill L. Davies =

Australian rules footballer

Bill Davies

Personal information
- Full name: William Levi Davies
- Born: 15 February 1883; Eaglehawk, Victoria
- Died: 23 July 1959 (aged 76); Oakleigh, Victoria
- Original teams: Yea, Williamstown
- Height: 173 cm (5 ft 8 in)
- Weight: 65 kg (143 lb)
- Position: Wingman

Playing career^{1}
Years	Club	Games (Goals)
1906–09	Essendon	65 (4)
- ^{1} Playing statistics correct to the end of 1909.

William Levi Davies (15 February 1883 – 23 July 1959) was an Australian rules footballer who played for Essendon in the Victorian Football League (VFL).

Davies started out at Williamstown in the Victorian Football Association after coming to Melbourne from Yea. He played for Williamstown from 1901 to 1905 and again in 1910–11, totalling 89 games and kicking 3 goals. He won a trophy for equal best attendance at training in 1901.

He debuted at Essendon in 1906 and was a wingman in their losing 1908 VFL Grand Final side. Davies also represented the league at interstate football during his time with Essendon.

Later an umpire, Davies officiated in two 1914 VFL season matches.
