= Mark Shea =

Australian rules footballer

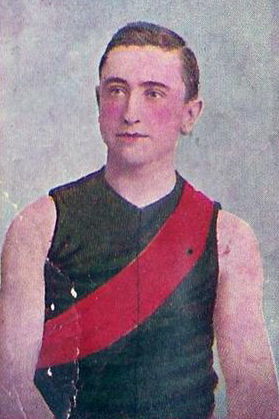
- Cigarette card of Shea in 1905

Personal information
- Full name: Mark Francis Shea
- Born: 24 April 1883; Clunes, Victoria
- Died: 28 March 1939 (aged 55); East Melbourne, Victoria
- Original teams: CBC Parade, East Melbourne
- Height: 173 cm (5 ft 8 in)
- Weight: 71 kg (157 lb)
- Position: Wingman

Playing career^{1}
| Years | Club | Games (Goals) |
| 1902–04 | Fitzroy | 24 (1) |
| 1905–09 | Essendon | 71 (0) |
| Total | | 95 (1) |
- ^{1} Playing statistics correct to the end of 1909.

Mark Shea (24 April 1883 – 28 March 1939) was an Australian rules footballer who played for Fitzroy and Essendon in the Victorian Football League (VFL).

His brother, Patrick Augustus Shea (1886–1954), also played with Fitzroy and Essendon in the VFL.

== Football ==
Shea, from East Melbourne's CBC Parade, could play a variety of positions but was most successful on the wing. He started out at Fitzroy and competed in finals his first two years, including a Preliminary Final in 1902.

Essendon secured his services in 1905 and was vice-captain for most of his time at the club. He played from the half back flank in Essendon's losing 1908 VFL Grand Final side, of which his brother Paddy Shea was also part of. Shea later served as a member of the Essendon committee.
