= Upper Plenty =

- Town
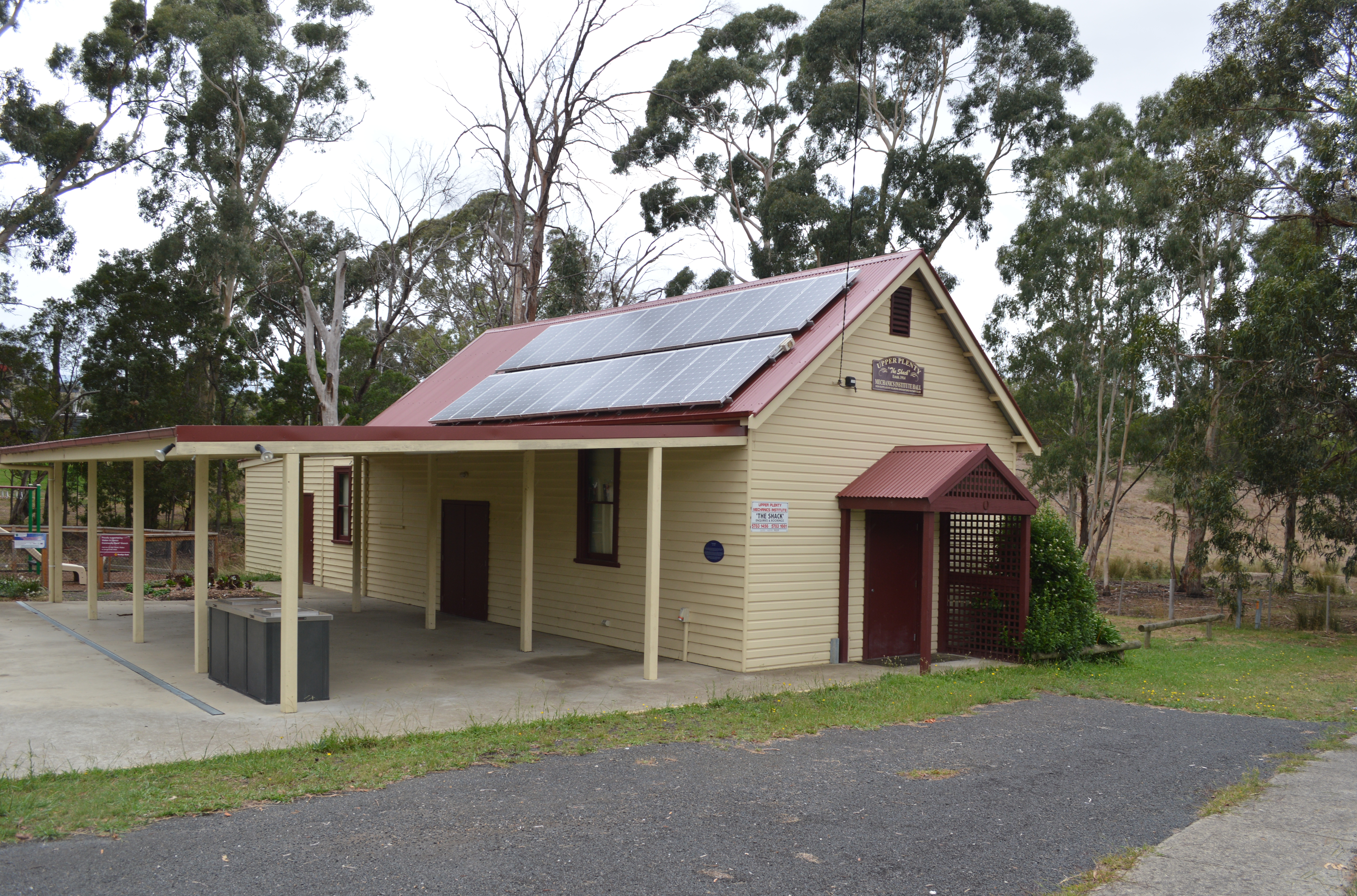
- Upper Plenty Mechanics Institute, 2015

- Coordinates: 37°25′37″S 145°03′25″E
- Country: Australia
- State: Victoria
- Region: Hume
- LGA: Shire of Mitchell
- Location: 50 km (31 mi) N of Melbourne; 11 km (6.8 mi) NW of Wallan

Government
  - State electorate: Yan Yean
  - Federal division: McEwen

Population
  - Total: 335 (2016 census)
- Postcode: 3756

Upper Plenty is a locality in central Victoria, Australia. The locality is in the Shire of Mitchell local government area, 50 kilometres (31 mi) north of the state capital, Melbourne.

At the 2016 census, Upper Plenty had a population of 335.
