= Arthur Legge (footballer) =

Australian rules footballer

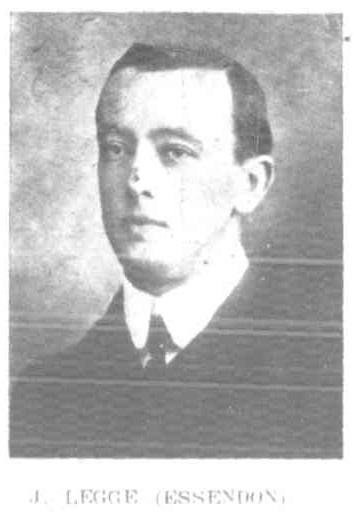
- Legge in 1907

Personal information
- Full name: Arthur George Leslie Legge
- Born: 5 October 1881; Melbourne, Victoria
- Died: 15 January 1941 (aged 59); Glen Huntly, Victoria
- Original teams: North Melbourne, Williamstown
- Positions: Forward pocket, rover

Playing career^{1}
Years	Club	Games (Goals)
1902–03	Williamstown (VFA)	25 (9)
1904–09	Essendon (VFL)	69 (30)
- ^{1} Playing statistics correct to the end of 1909.

Arthur George Leslie Legge (5 October 1881 – 15 January 1941) was an Australian rules footballer who played for Williamstown in the Victorian Football Association (VFA) and for Essendon in the Victorian Football League (VFL).

== Family ==
The son of John Vickery Legge (1860–1926), and Elizabeth Legge, Arthur George Leslie Legge was born on 5 October 1881.

He married Ada Dixon on 17 July 1915.

== Football ==
He played as a rover, either resting in the back-pocket or the forward-pocket.

=== Williamstown (VFA) ===
He came to Williamstown as a "local junior", and went on to play 25 games and score 9 goals for Williamstown in the VFA in two seasons (1902 and 1903).

=== Essendon (VFL) ===
Cleared from Williamstown to Essendon on 13 May 1904, he went on to play 69 games and score 30 goals for Essendon in the VFL over six seasons (1904 to 1909).

Playing at forward-pocket in Essendon's 1908 VFL Grand Final team, Legge kicked the second of Essendon's three goals in its 3.8 (26) to 5.5 (35) loss to Carlton. His last game for Essendon was in the side that lost 8.11 (59) to 9.14 (68) to University on 22 May 1909.

== Death ==
He died at his home in Glen Huntly, Victoria on 15 January 1941.
