= Bill Sewart =

Australian sportsman (1881–1928)

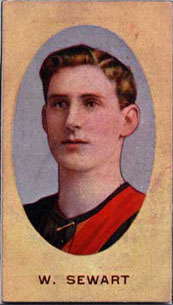

Personal information
- Full name: William Isaac Sewart
- Born: 12 November 1881; Allendale East, South Australia
- Died: 13 December 1928 (aged 47); Caulfield, Victoria
- Original team: Castlemaine
- Debut: Round 2, 1905, Essendon vs. Geelong, at East Melbourne
- Height: 175 cm (5 ft 9 in)
- Weight: 76 kg (168 lb)

Playing career^{1}
Years	Club	Games (Goals)
1905–1915	Essendon	171 (7)
- ^{1} Playing statistics correct to the end of 1915.

Career highlights
- AIF Pioneer Exhibition Game, London, 28 October 1916

William Isaac Sewart (12 November 1881 – 13 December 1928) was an Australian rules footballer who played with Essendon in the Victorian Football League (VFL). He was also a first-class cricketer, representing both Queensland and Victoria.

== Family ==
The son of Myles and Mary Ann Sewart, née Lock, he was born on 12 November 1881 at Allendale East, South Australia, and married Annie Roseman (1883–1931) in 1909.

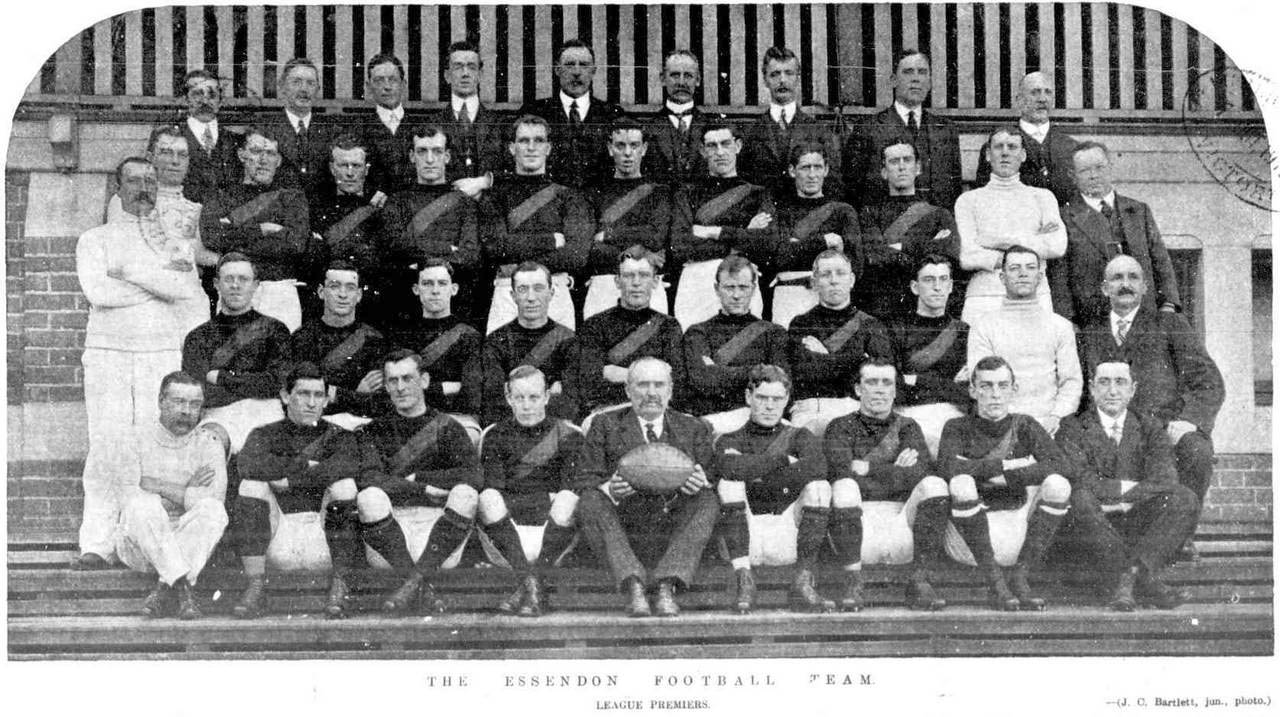
1912 VFL Premiership Team (Essendon). Bill Sewart is second player from right, back row.

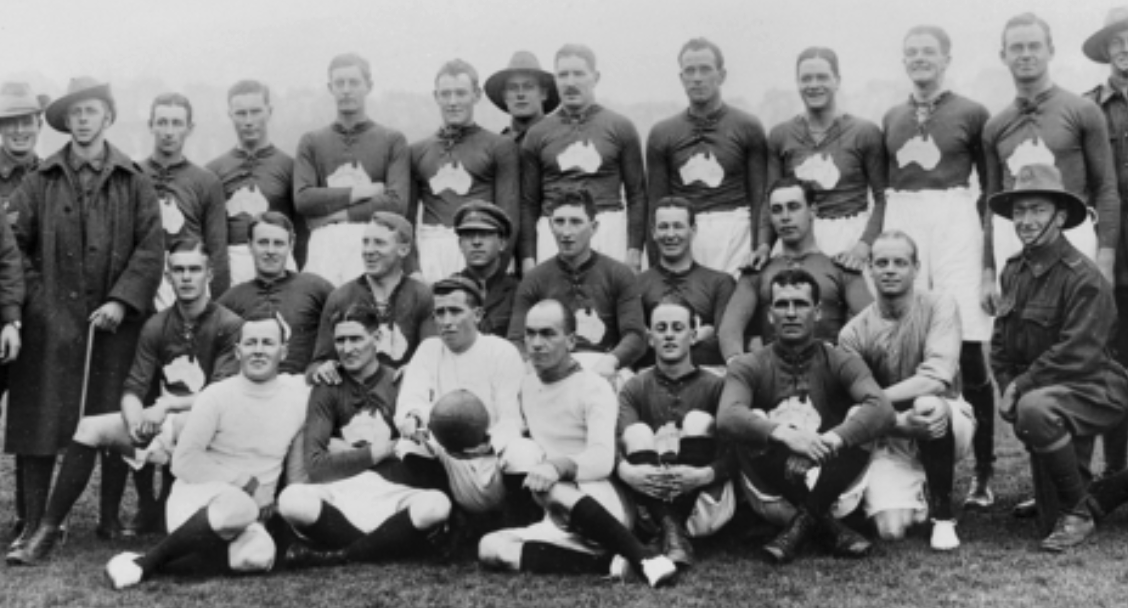
The Third Australian Divisional Team: 28 October 1916. Bill Sewart is the first player from left, front row.

== Footballer ==
In his youth, he was considered to be one of the best all-round athletes his district had ever produced.

A centre-man, he was recruited by Essendon in 1905 from Castlemaine, who played in the Castlemaine Football Association.

He played in 161 senior home-and-away games and ten finals matches for Essendon, kicking seven goals. He played in Essendon's 1911 and 1912 premiership teams.

He represented Victoria three times: in an intrastate match against a combined Ballarat District team, at the MCG, on 23 June 1906, and, although not originally selected, in an intrastate match against a combined Ballarat District team, at the MCG, on 8 June 1907, and in an interstate match against South Australia, on 6 July 1912, at the MCG.

He was Essendon's vice-captain in 1914 and 1915.

== Coach ==
When he returned to Australia from his overseas service with the AIF, aged 38, he became coach of the Victorian Football Association (VFA) team, Footscray.

Initially playing as captain-coach— he resigned as captain in early July 1919, and played two more matches before retiring altogether — he coached Footscray to a premiership win against North Melbourne in the 1919 VFA season.

== Cricketer ==
He played District cricket with the Carlton Cricket Club.

In Sewart's 13 first-class cricket matches he made 435 runs at 20.71. Two of those matches were for Queensland in the 1908/09 summer while the rest were with Victoria. He represented Victoria in the 1909/10 and 1913/14 Sheffield Shield seasons.

Only twice did he pass 50 in a match and both of those innings came against Tasmania at the MCG in January 1913. His scores of 143 and 69 not out was not enough however to prevent a Tasmanian victory. Victoria's team in that match included Patrick "Paddy" Shea, his Essendon teammate, as well as Fitzroy premiership player Chris Kiernan.

Whilst serving in the AIF, he played in an international match for an Australian military team, against an Indian team, at Lords, on Saturday, 11 August 1917.

== Military service ==
Enlisting on 18 January 1916, listing his occupation as draughtsman, employed by the Melbourne and Metropolitan Board of Works, he served as a private in the 3rd Pioneer Battalion, First AIF.

Whilst in England, he played for the (winning) Third Australian Divisional team in the famous "Pioneer Exhibition Game" of Australian Rules football, held in London, in October 1916. A news film was taken at the match.

Hospitalized in early 1917 with "an affection of the throat", it was, later, considered that he had chronic bronchitis and "incipient tuberculosis" (on examining Seward, the army Medical Officer reported on 5 January 1918 that he "could not stand winter conditions in France"), he returned to Australia on 19 October 1917, and was discharged on medical grounds on 24 January 1918.

== Death ==
He died at the Caulfield Military Hospital on 13 December 1928.

== Commemorated ==
He is commemorated on the Roll of Honour of employees of the Melbourne and Metropolitan Board of Works who enlisted for active service in the First World War.

== See also ==
- List of Victoria first-class cricketers
- 1916 Pioneer Exhibition Game
