= Harry Farnsworth =

Australian rules footballer

Personal information
- Full name: Henry Rupert Farnsworth
- Born: 3 December 1885; Melbourne, Victoria
- Died: 8 March 1960 (aged 74); Adelaide, South Australia
- Original team: West Melbourne
- Position: Forward

Playing career^{1}
Years	Club	Games (Goals)
1908–09	Essendon	24 (16)
1910	St Kilda	1 (1)
1911	Sturt	
Total		25 (17)
- ^{1} Playing statistics correct to the end of 1910.

Henry Rupert Farnsworth (3 December 1885 – 8 March 1960) was an Australian rules footballer who played with Essendon and St Kilda in the Victorian Football League (VFL).
