= Les Minto =

Australian rules footballer

Personal information
- Full name: Leslie Clifford Minto
- Born: 11 July 1886; Northcote, Victoria
- Died: 30 March 1955 (aged 68); Fairfield, Victoria
- Original team: Collingwood Juniors

Playing career^{1}
Years	Club	Games (Goals)
1903	West Melbourne (VFA)	1 (0)
1905	Melbourne	1 (1)
1905–07	West Melbourne (VFA)	48 (8)
1908–09	Essendon	25 (7)
1910–12	Northcote (VFA)	10 (4)
- ^{1} Playing statistics correct to the end of 1909.

Leslie Clifford Minto (11 July 1886 – 30 March 1955) was an Australian rules footballer who played with Melbourne and Essendon in the Victorian Football League (VFL).
