= Wallan =

- Town
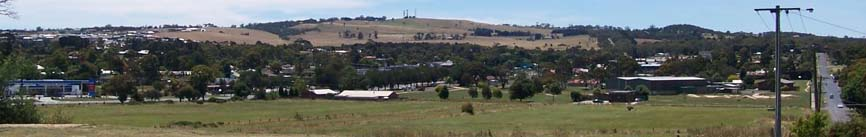
- Wallan from the top of Green Hill

- Interactive map of Wallan
- Coordinates: 37°25′S 144°59′E
- Country: Australia
- State: Victoria
- Region: Hume
- LGA: Shire of Mitchell
- Location: 45 km (28 mi) from Melbourne

Government
  - State electorate: Kalkallo
  - Federal division: McEwen
- Elevation: 308 m (1,010 ft)

Population
  - Total: 15,004 (2021 census)
- Postcode: 3756
- Parish: Wallan Wallan
Localities around Wallan
Lancefield	Kilmore	Wandong
Romsey	Wallan	Upper Plenty
Romsey	Beveridge	Upper Plenty

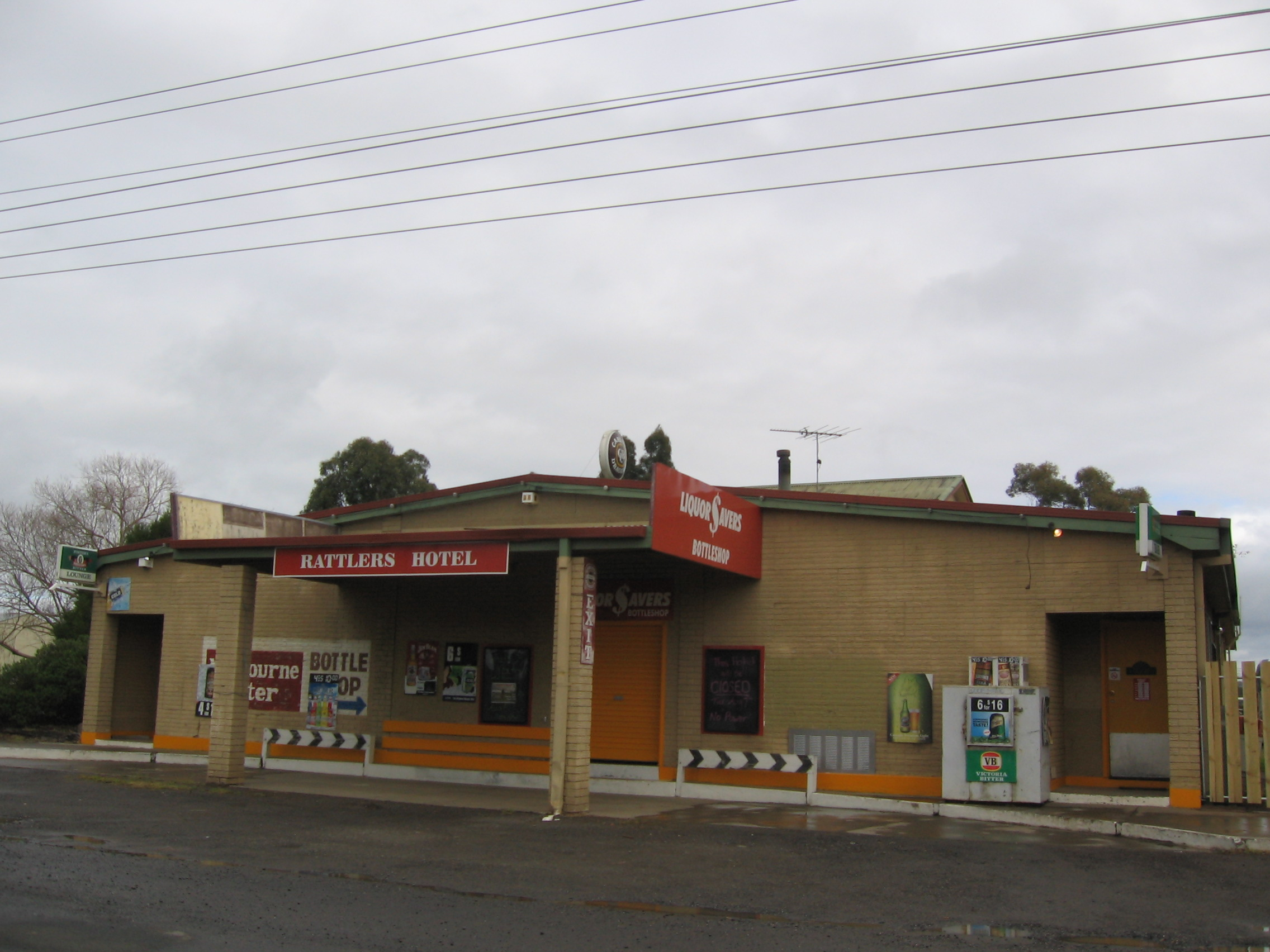
The Rattlers Hotel

Wallan /ˈwɒlən/, traditionally known as Wallan Wallan (large circular place of water), is a town in Victoria, 45 kilometres (28 miles) north of Melbourne's Central Business District. The town sits at the southern end of the large and diverse Shire of Mitchell which extends from the northern fringes of Melbourne into the farming country of north-central Victoria and the lower Goulburn Valley. The township flanks the Hume Freeway and is set against the backdrop of the Great Dividing Range. At the 2021 census it had a population of 15,004.

== Overview ==
The fastest growing town and now the largest town in the Mitchell Shire, Wallan is a link between the city and rural towns such as Kilmore, Broadford and Seymour. 15 kilometres to the north is a turnoff to Strath Creek which leads through the Valley of a Thousand Hills.

== History ==
A Wallan Wallan Post Office opened on 1 April 1858. A Wallan Railway Station Post Office opened on 1 October 1873, later renamed as Wallan Wallan East and closing in 1992.

The first and only surviving store was begun by Hugh and Margaret Sinclair about 1860 with their 2-storey residence. In 1867 Thomas O'Dwyer began a store where the Wallan Hotel now stands. He converted the store to the Woodmans Arms Hotel in 1883. George Wallder and John Kyle supplied meat to the township. The first church erected in Wallan was a wooden building that cost 71 pounds and was opened by the Methodist residents in 1865. Wallan became part of the preaching circuit in 1864 and the following year the modest chapel was built.

In the past, Wallan was a small village with only a few houses and a shop. 1km north of Wallan is the Hidden Valley Housing Development, which until 1997 was a private farm; however, it has now been developed as a residential estate with a golf course running through the middle.

The Wellington Square Shopping Centre, opened in 2004, includes many corporate franchise businesses (mainly Victoria's biggest supermarket chain Safeway), creating competition for the already existing Coles Supermarket across the road.

In 2009, Wallan was used as a relief centre for those from surrounding towns affected by the Black Saturday fires.

== Education ==
Wallan offers both primary and secondary education. Wallan Primary School (est.1857) and Wallan Secondary College (est.2006). Catholic education can be sourced in the nearby town of Kilmore through Saint Patricks Primary and Assumption College Kilmore, and private education through The Kilmore International School (y3-y12) teaching the IB diploma (Permanently closed in January 2023). Childcare and Kindergarten programs in Wallan are offered by multiple private childcare centres and the Mitchell Shire Kindergarten (operating within Wallan Primary School grounds).

== Transport ==
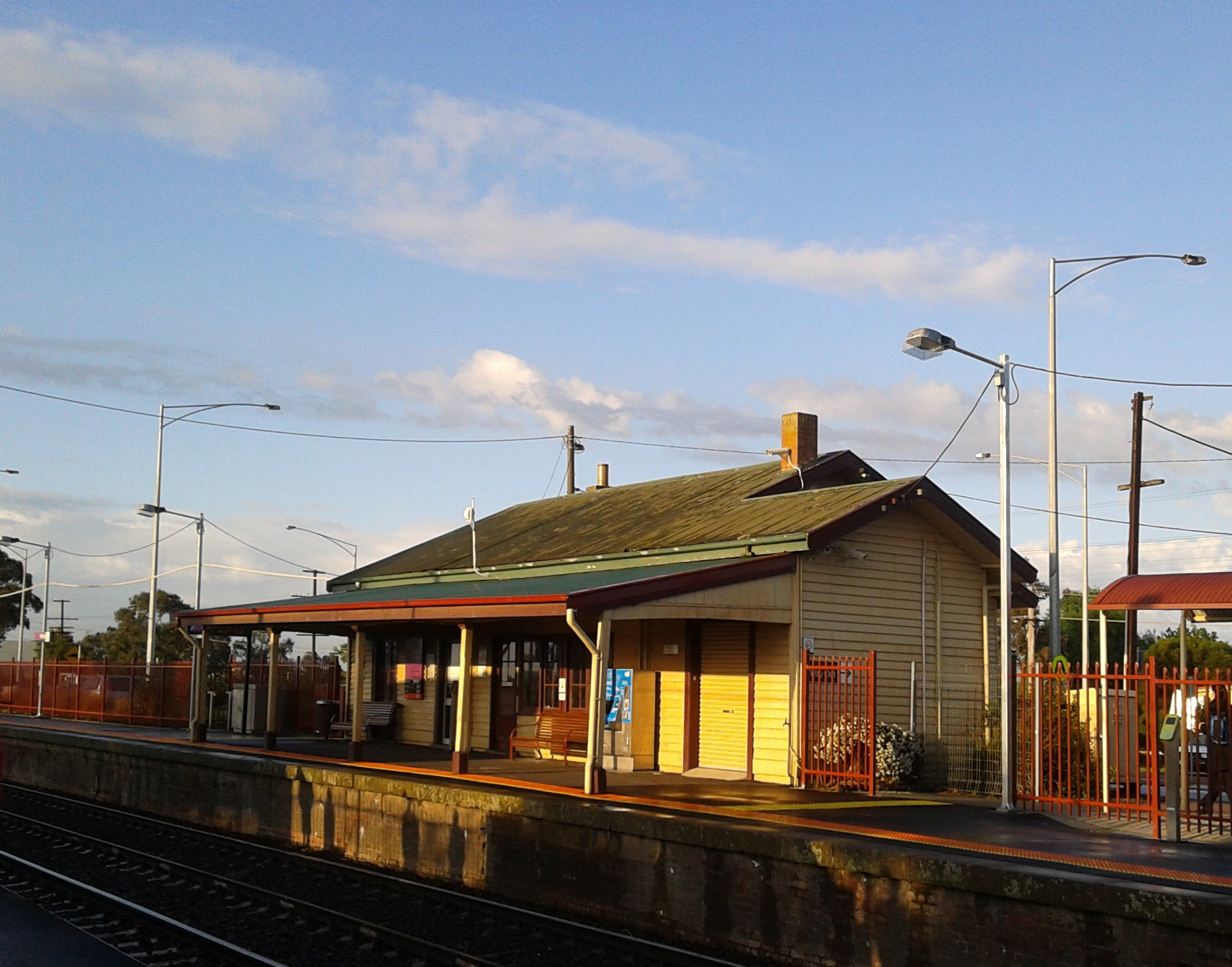
Wallan Train Station

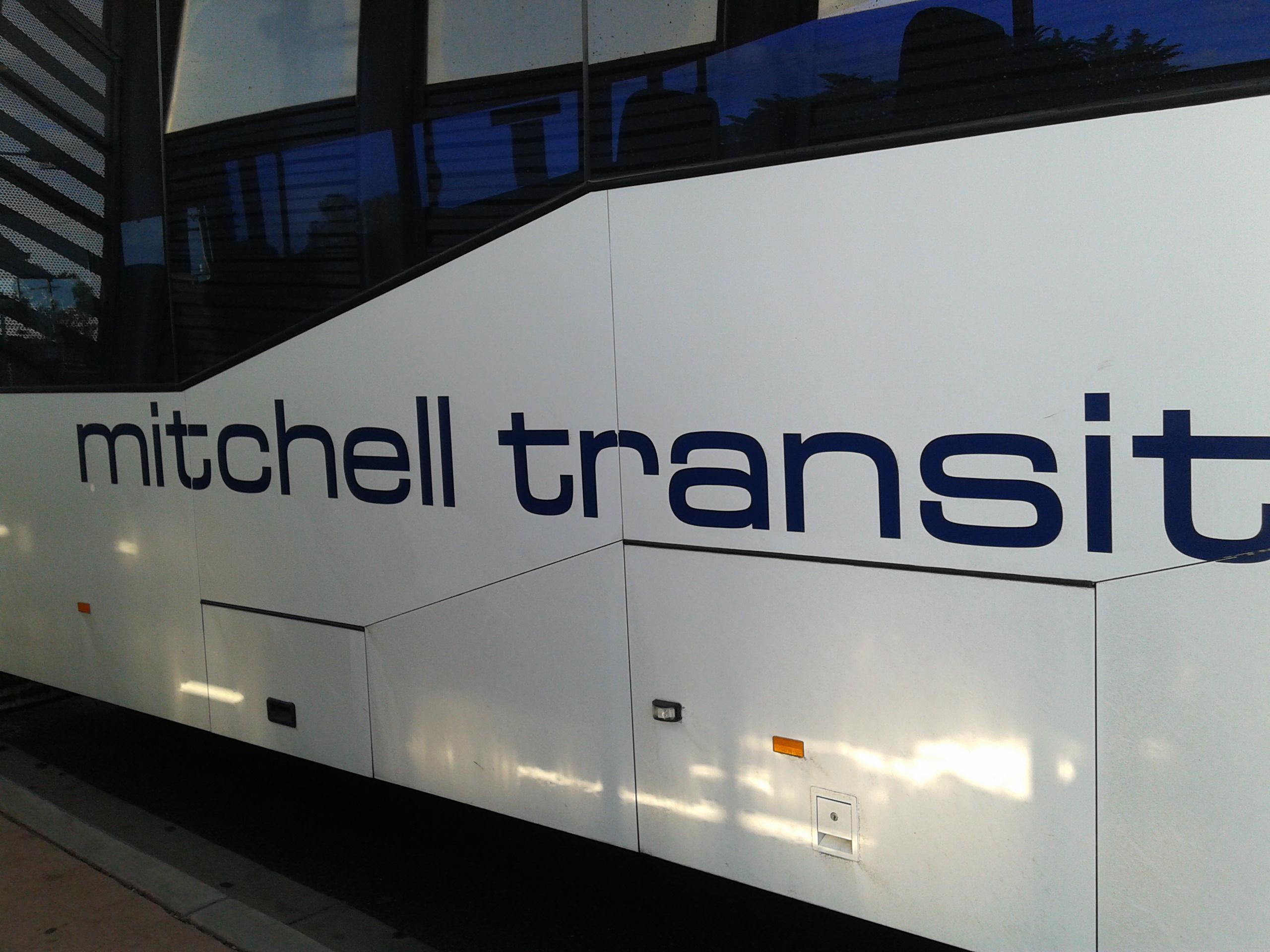
Mitchel Transit Bus service by shire

Wallan station is well connected with the V/Line train network on the Seymour line. Mitchell Shire also operates a town to station connecting bus service for peak hour commuters. There is a bus service from Barmah that serves Wallan to Southern Cross station.

== Parks ==
Wallan has parks in prominent locations, and within estates. It also has a small water park (running mainly in the warmer months) located in the town centre at Hadfield park, this is a large adventure playground with a small splash area and ample picnic spaces including sheltered seating with bbq facilities. There are very limited recreational facilities in the town. Walkways have been improved in recent years with re-vegetation of wetland areas along Watson st and storm water mitigation ponds around Wallara Waters.

== Gallery ==
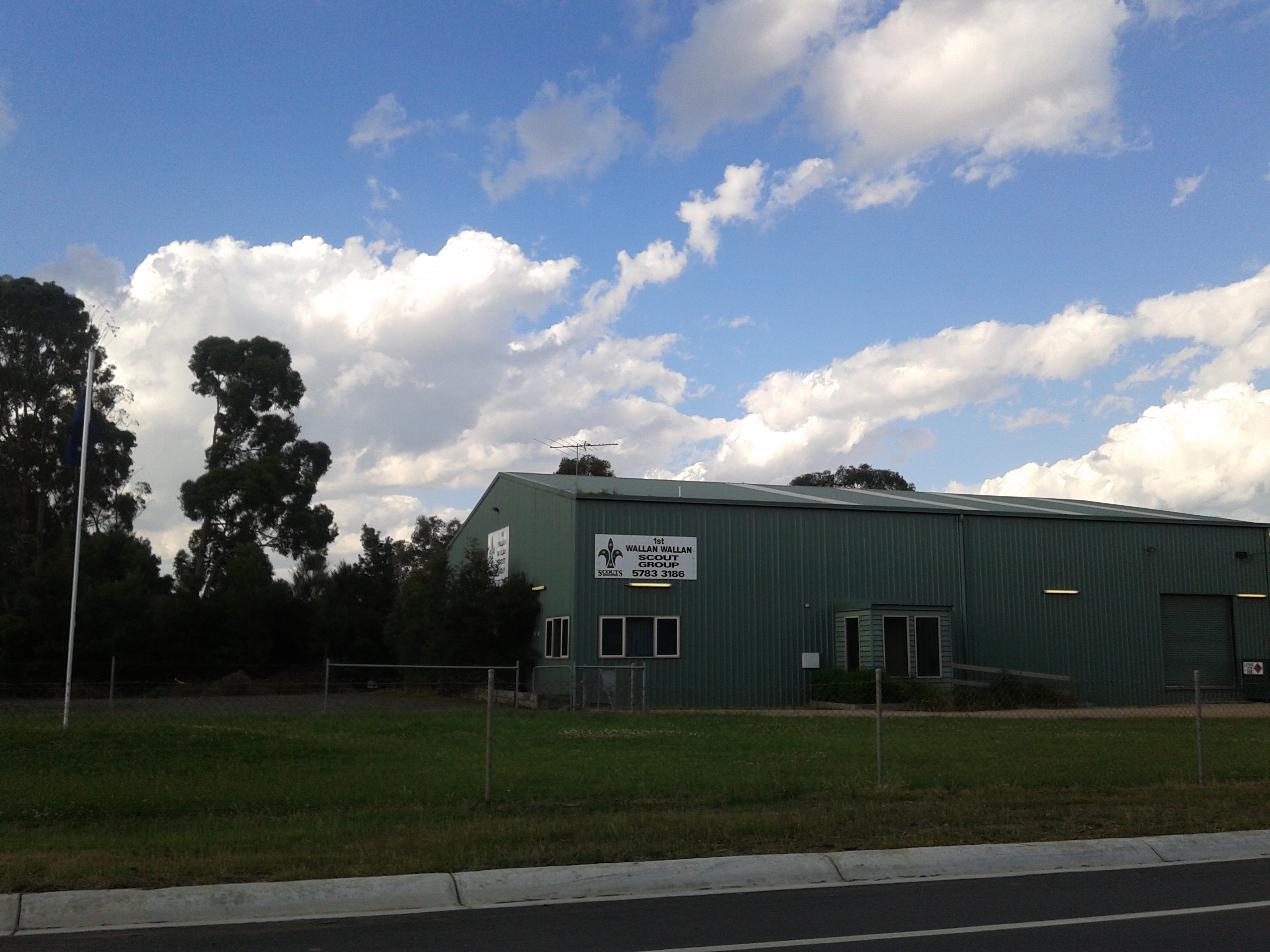

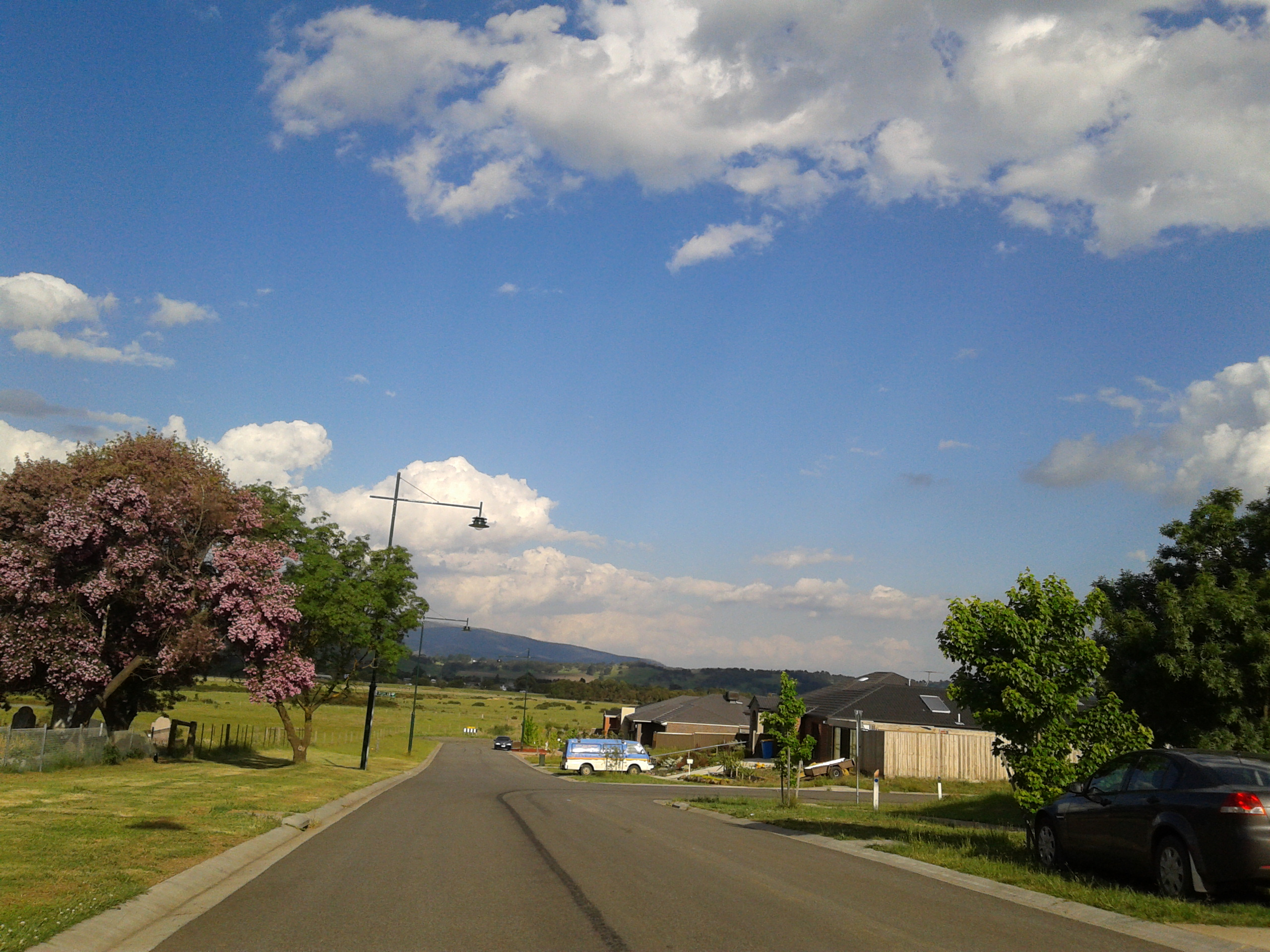

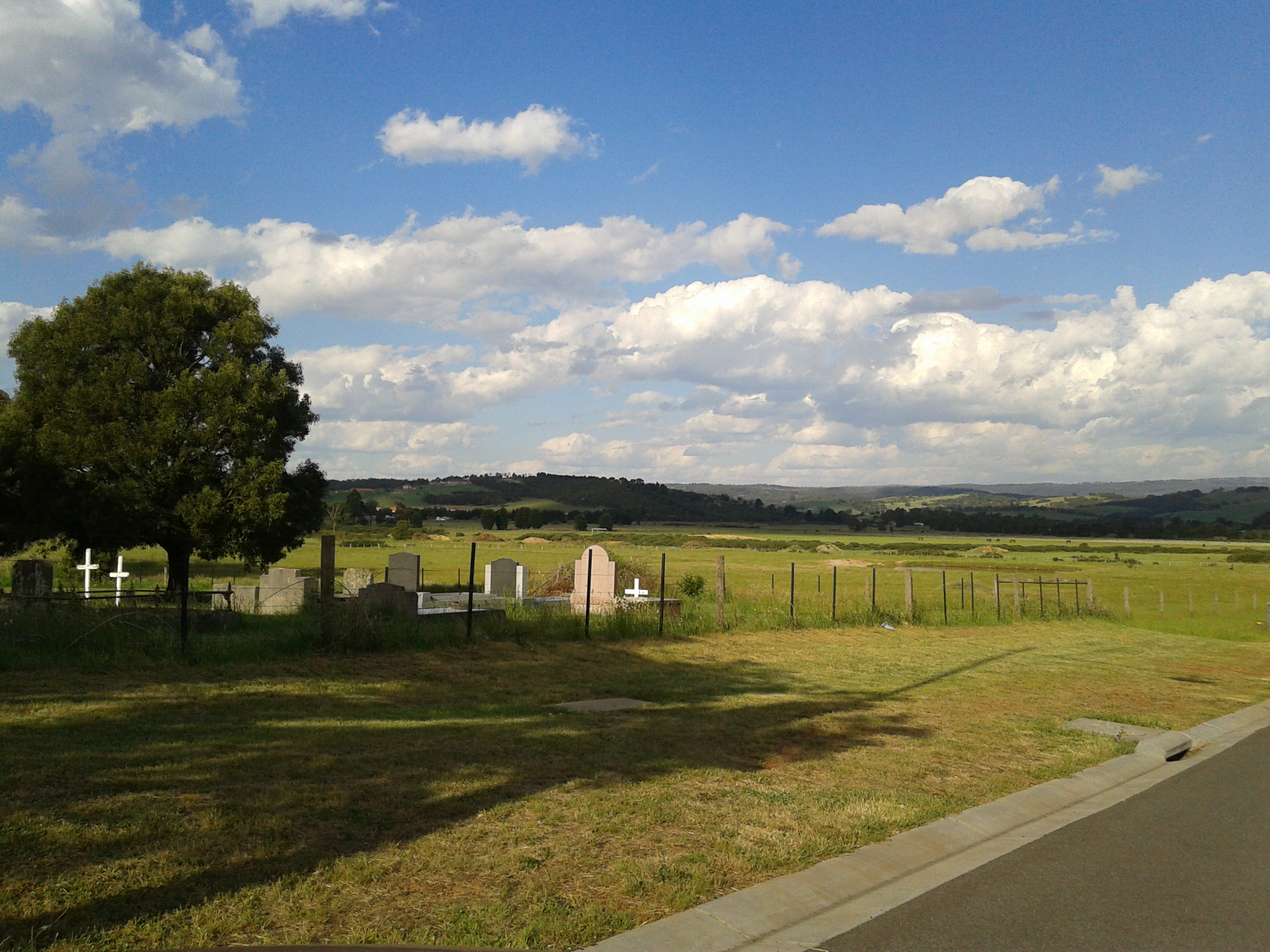

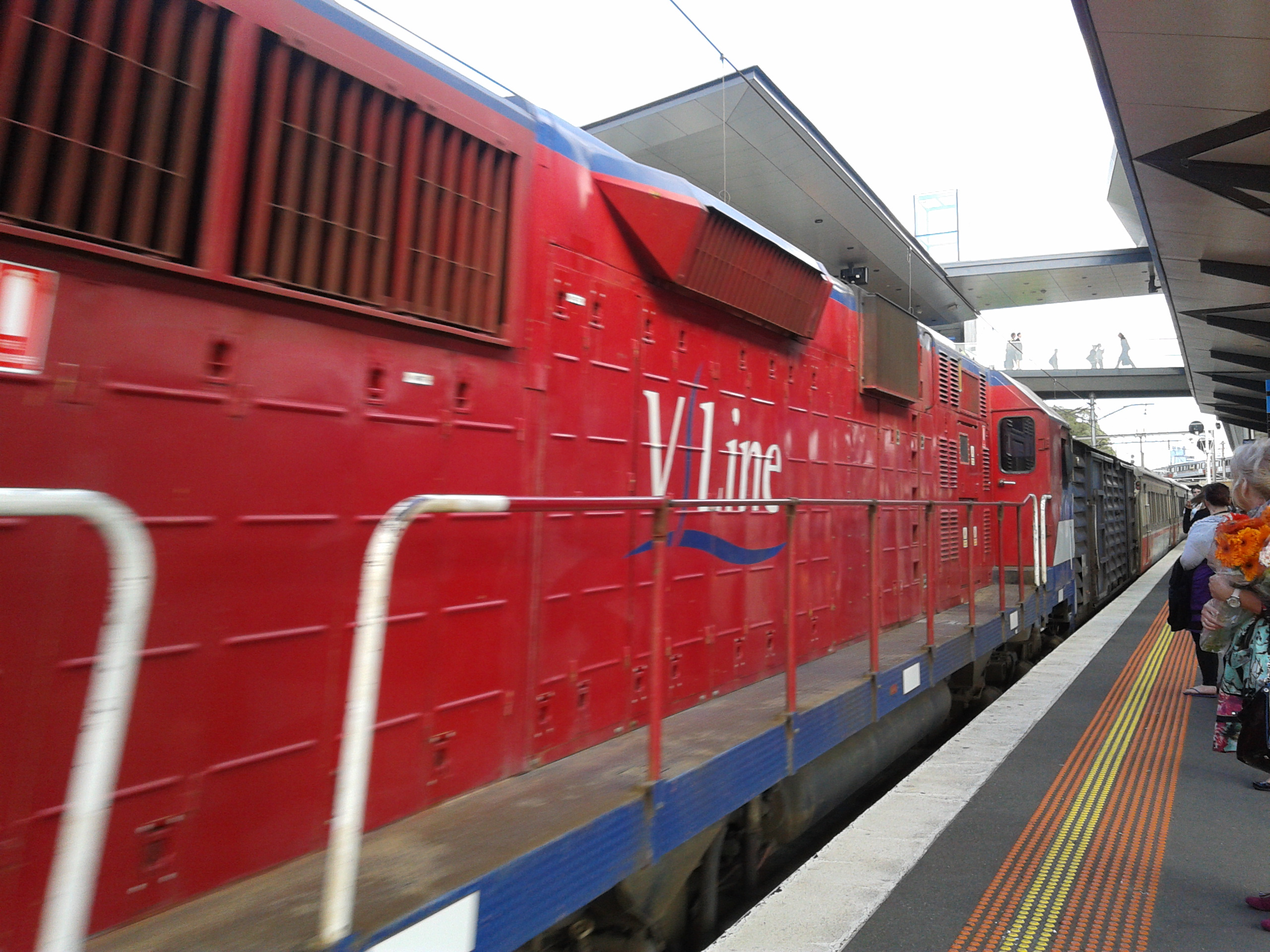

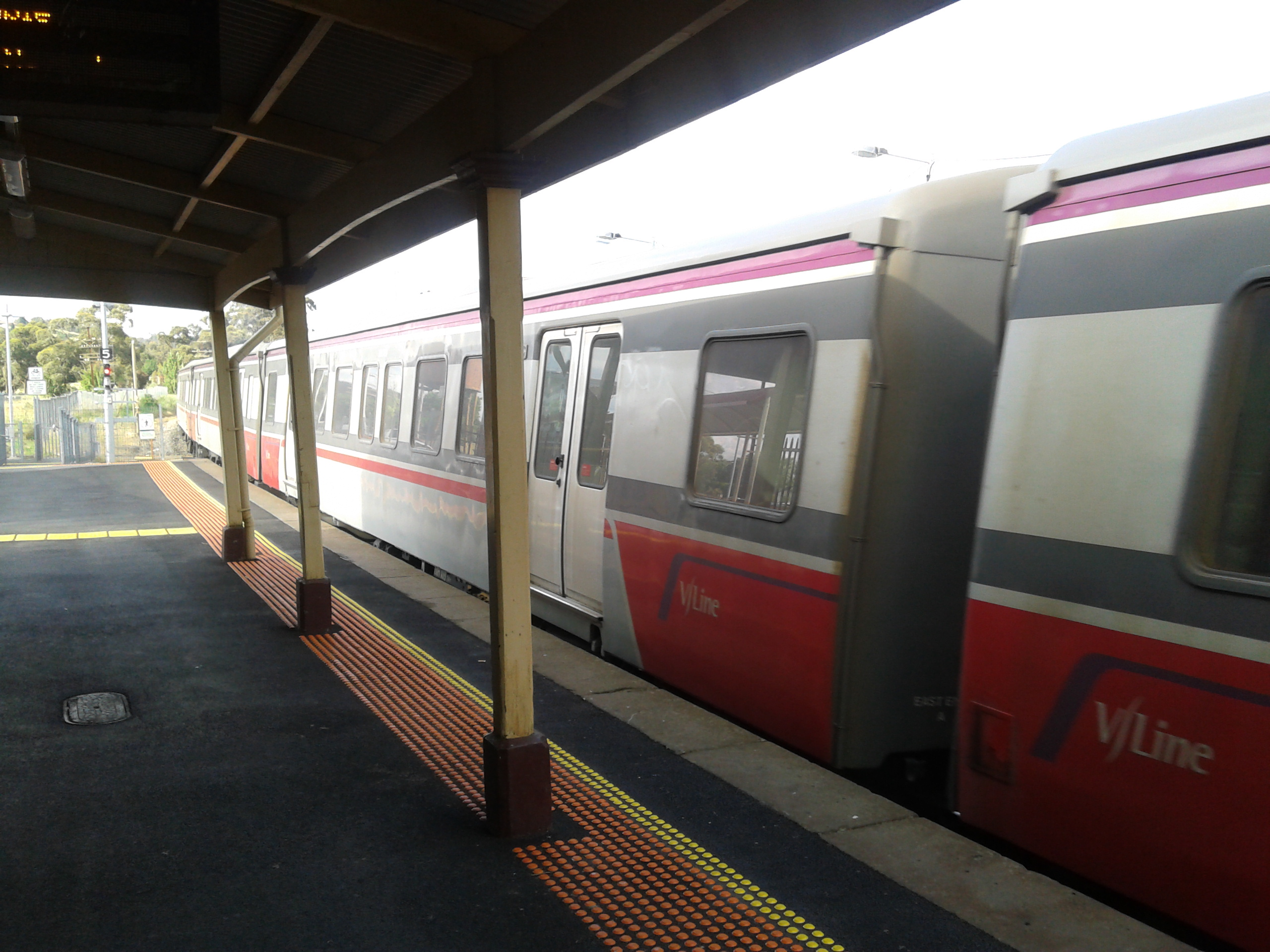

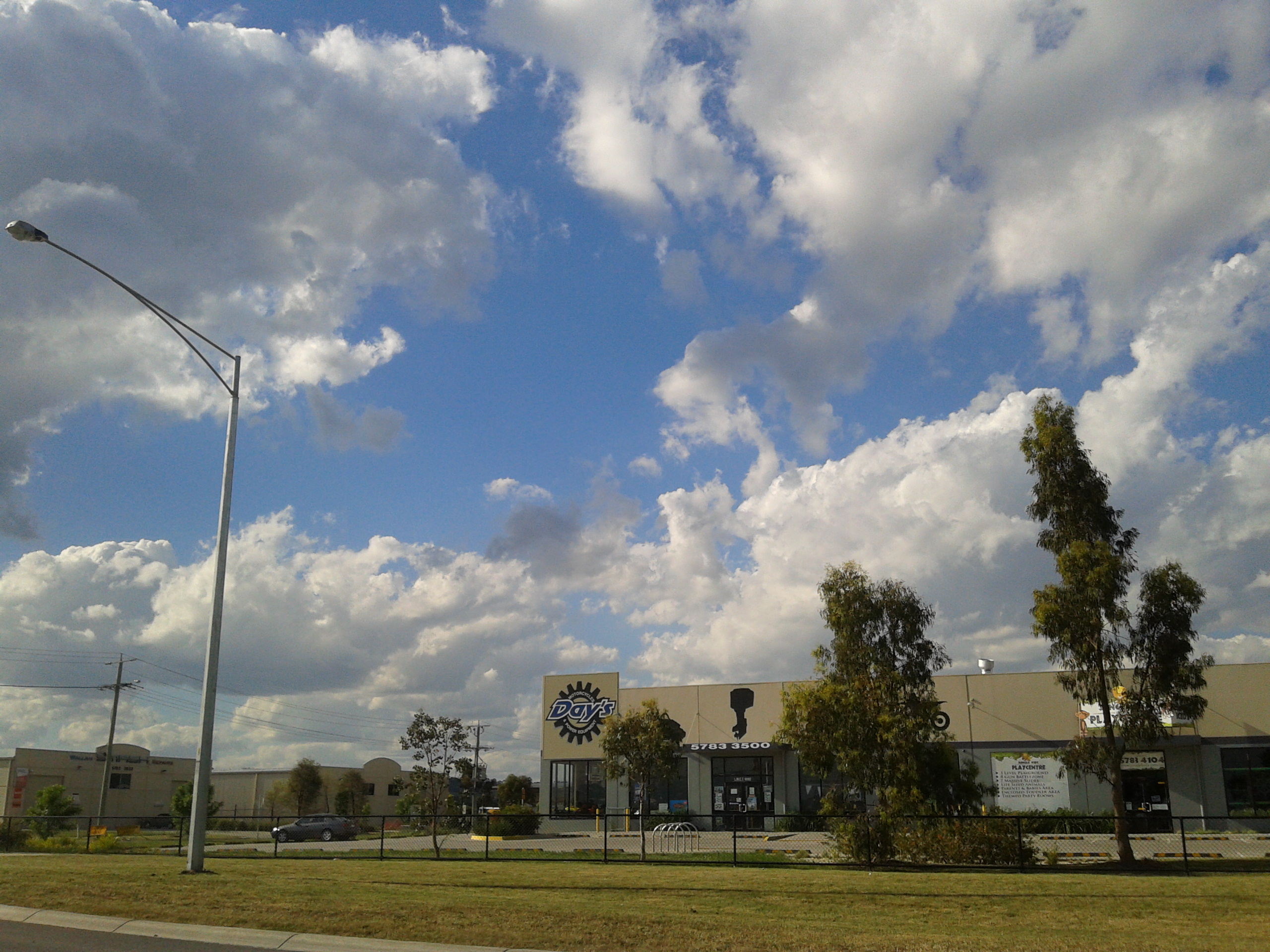

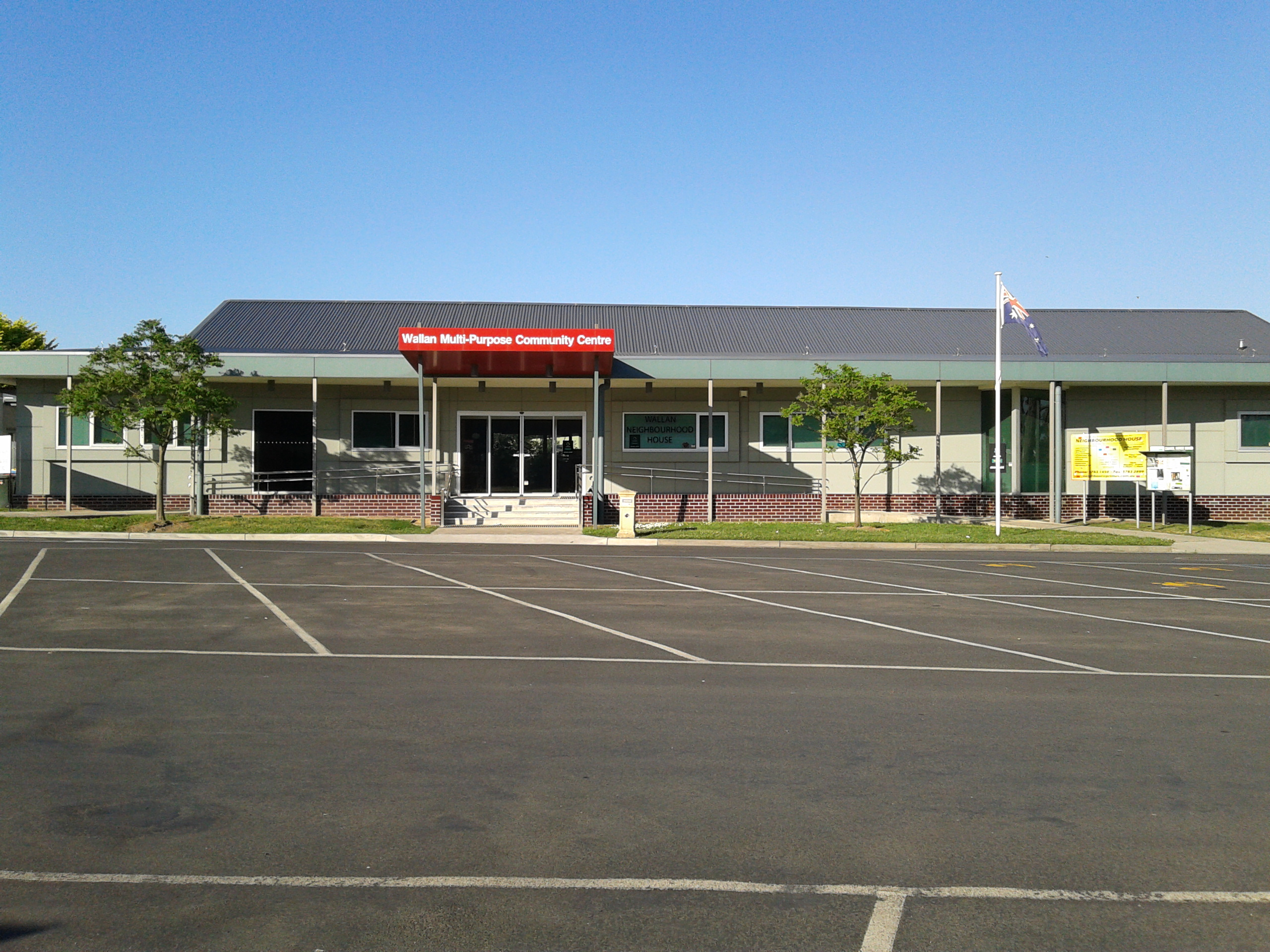

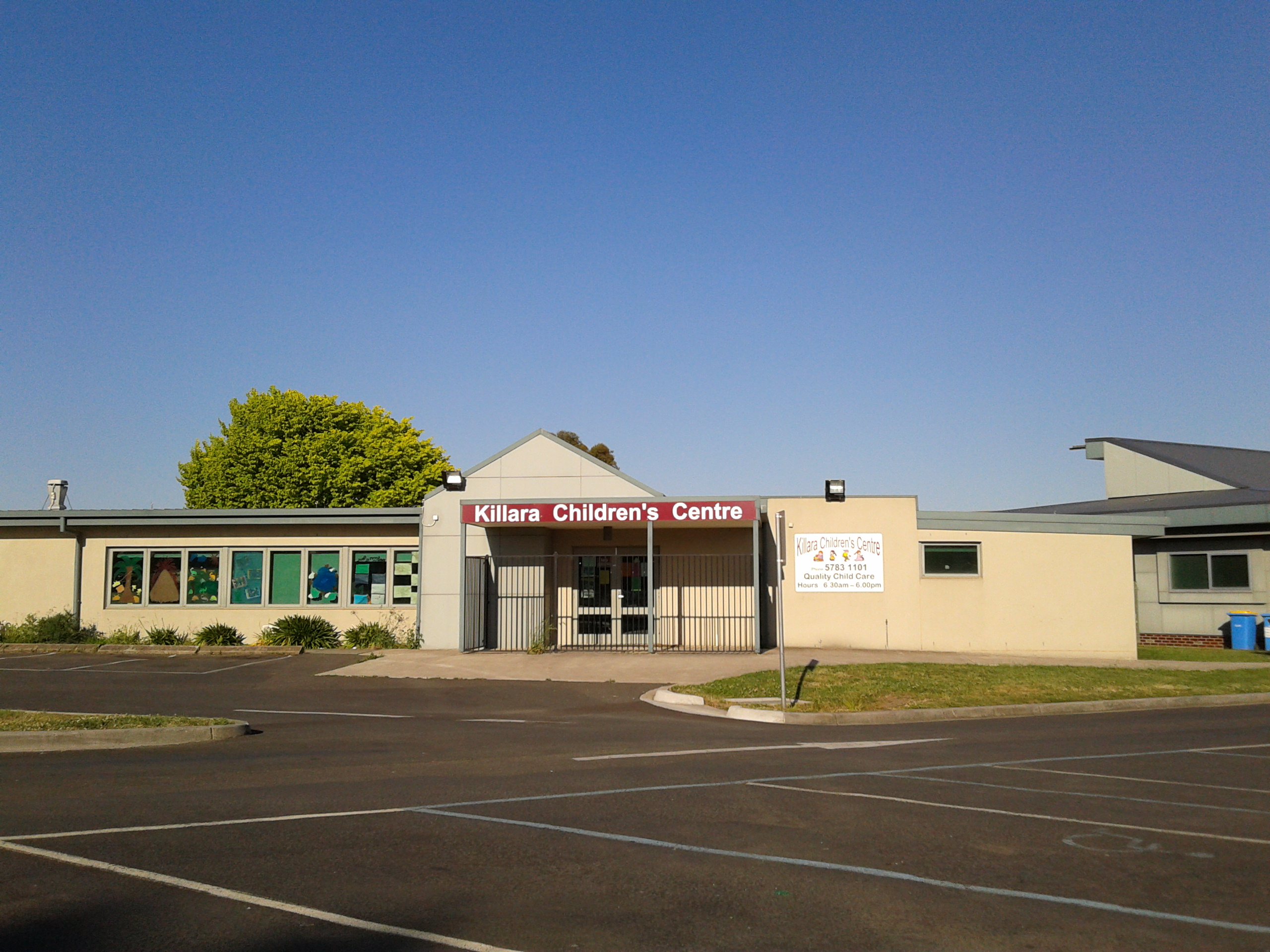

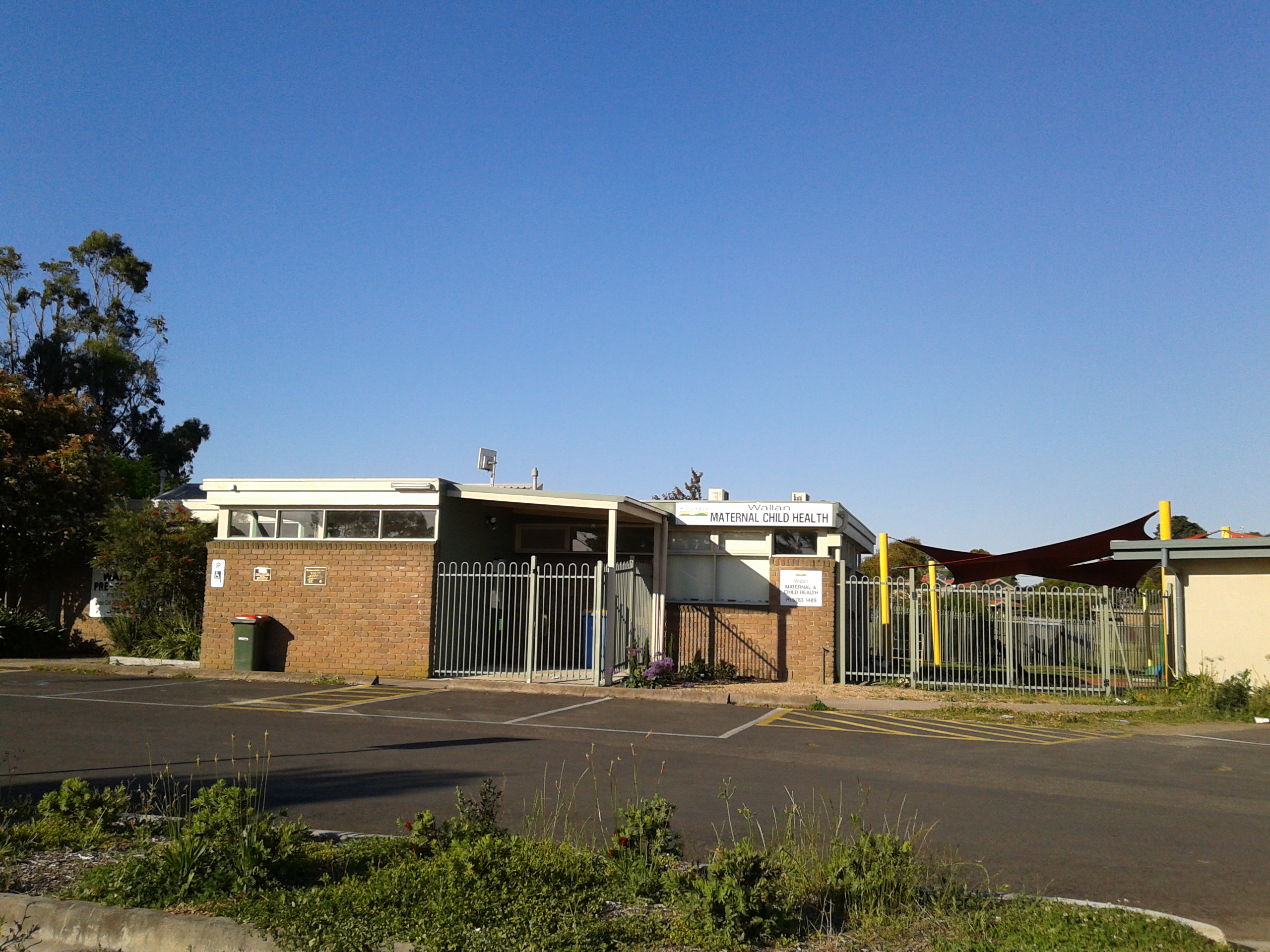

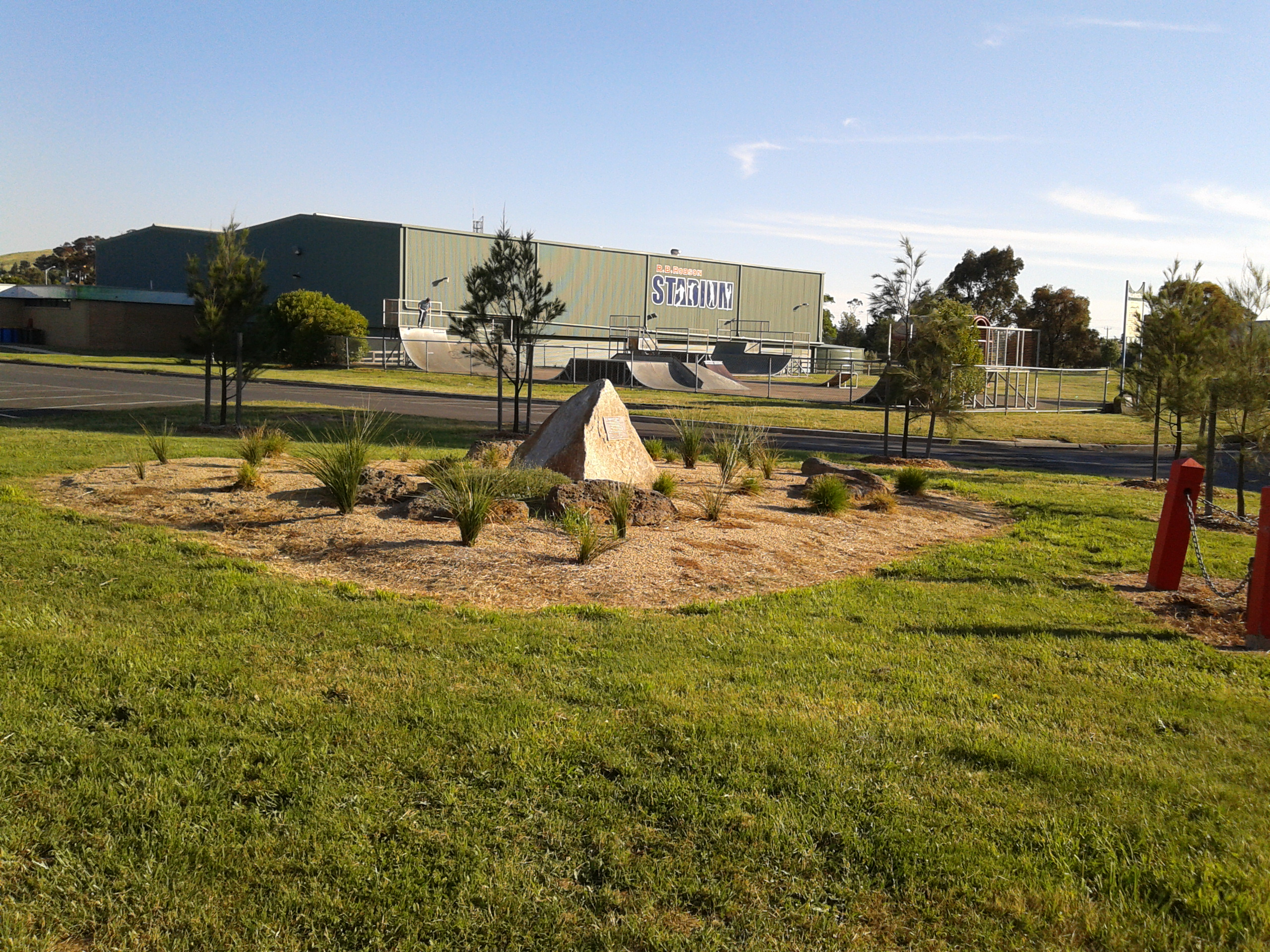

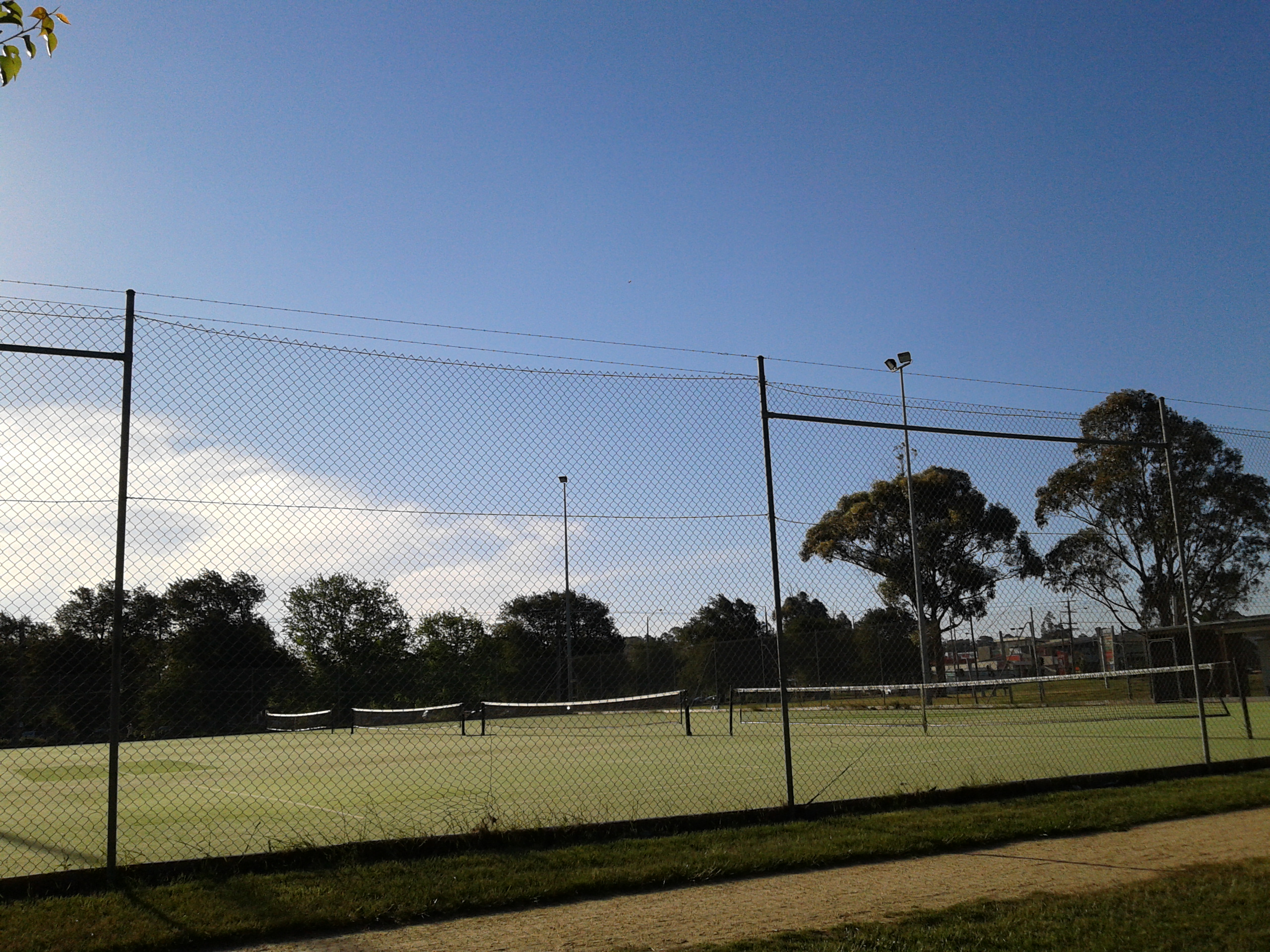

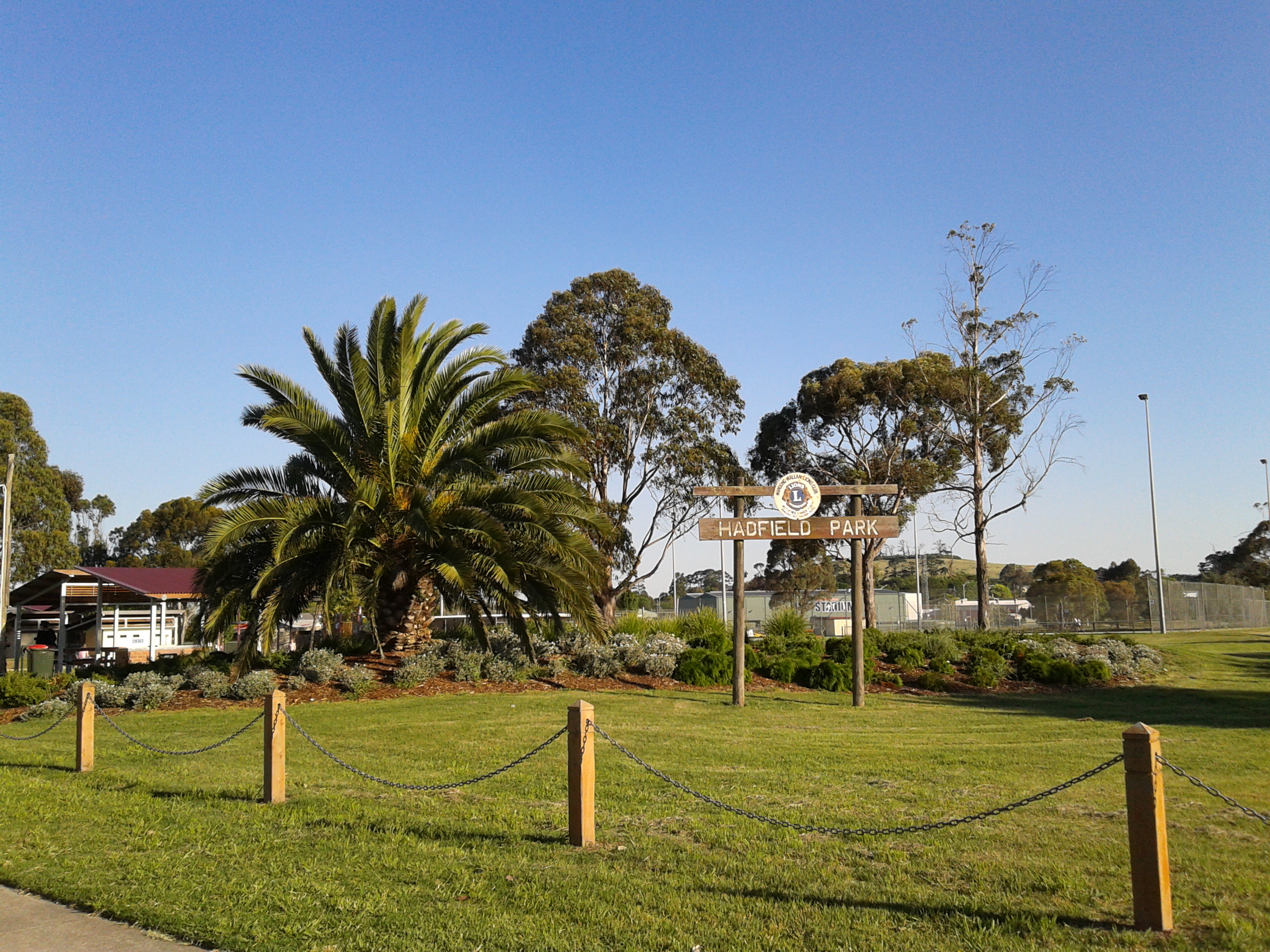

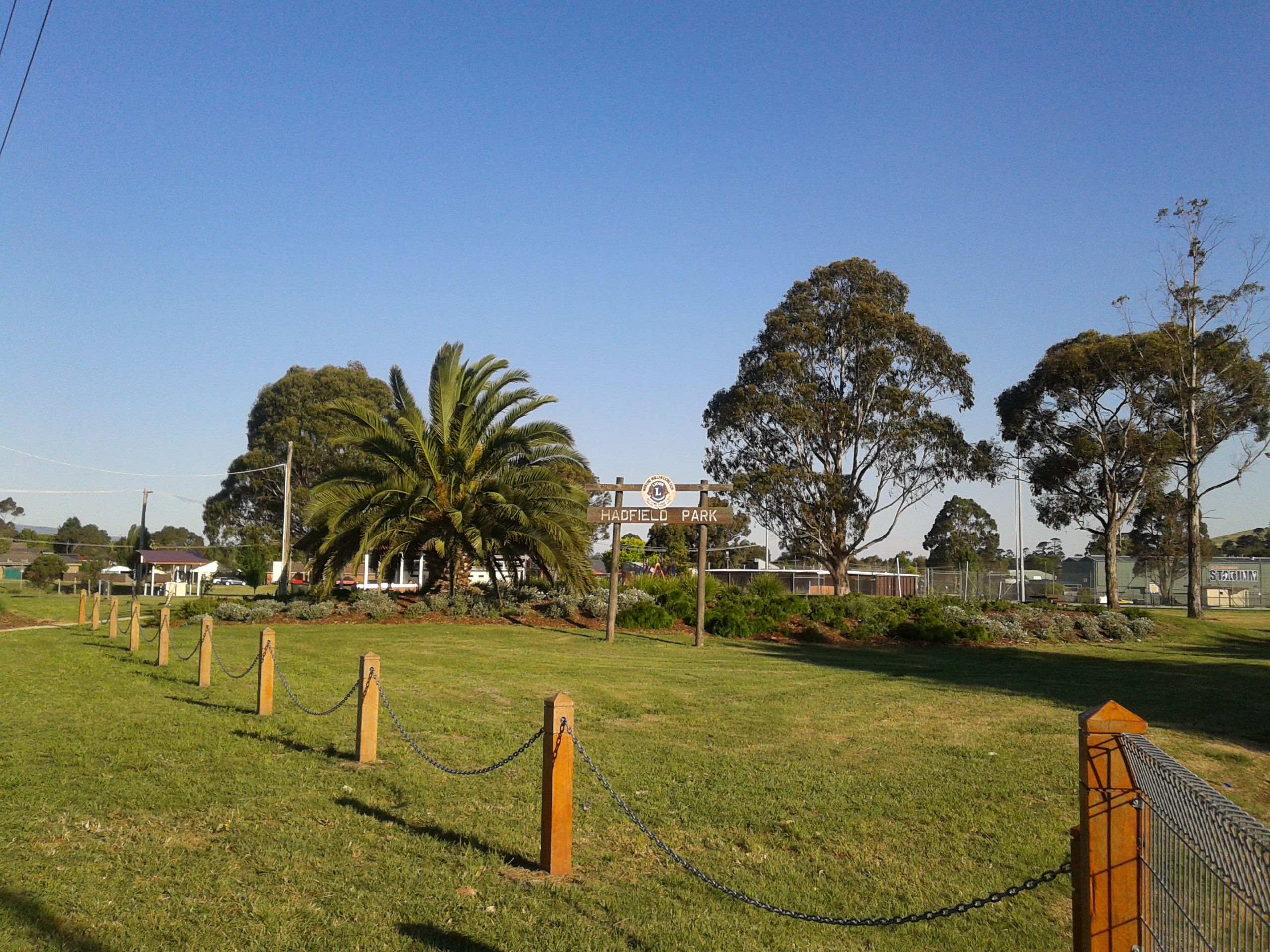

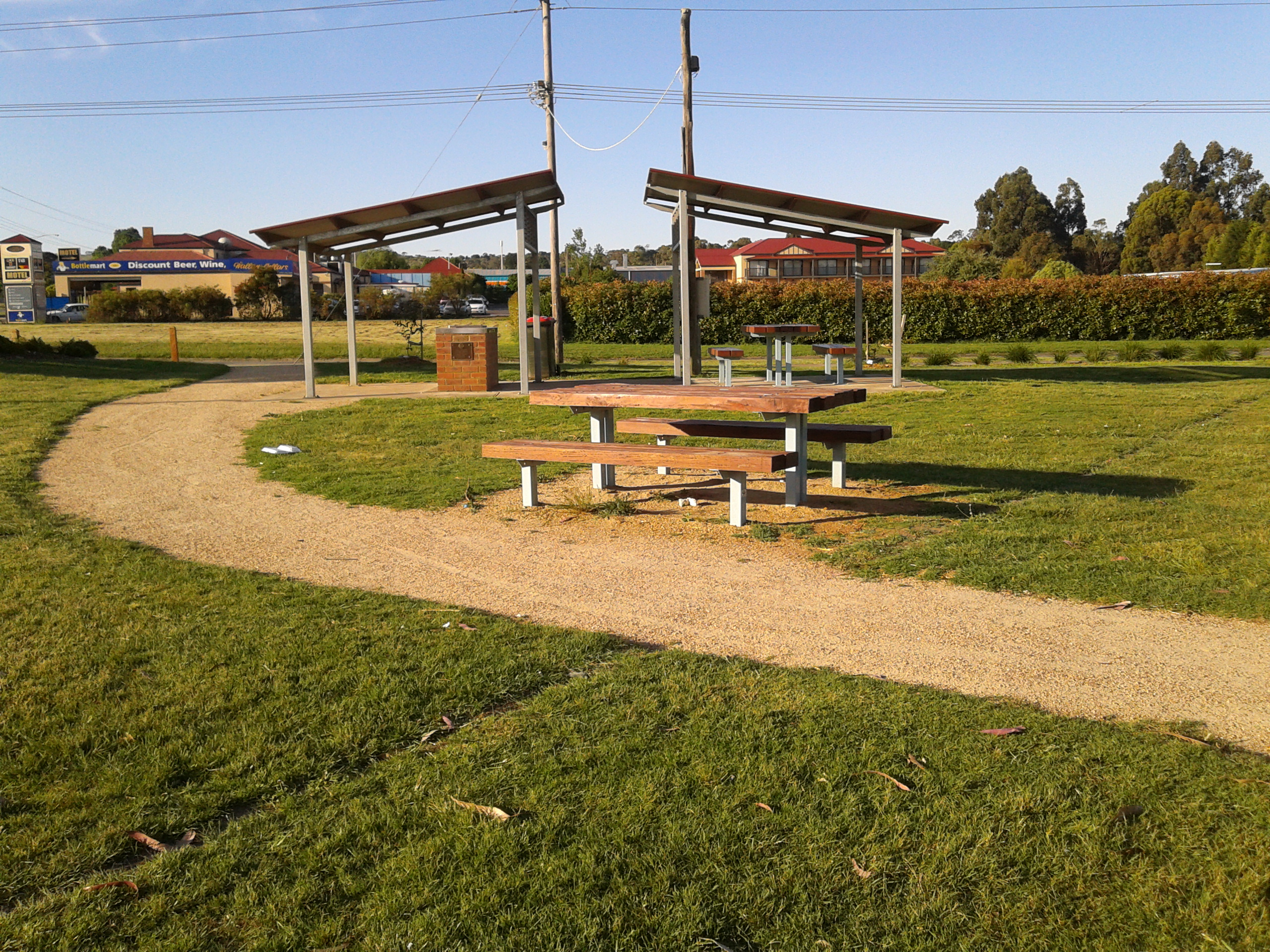

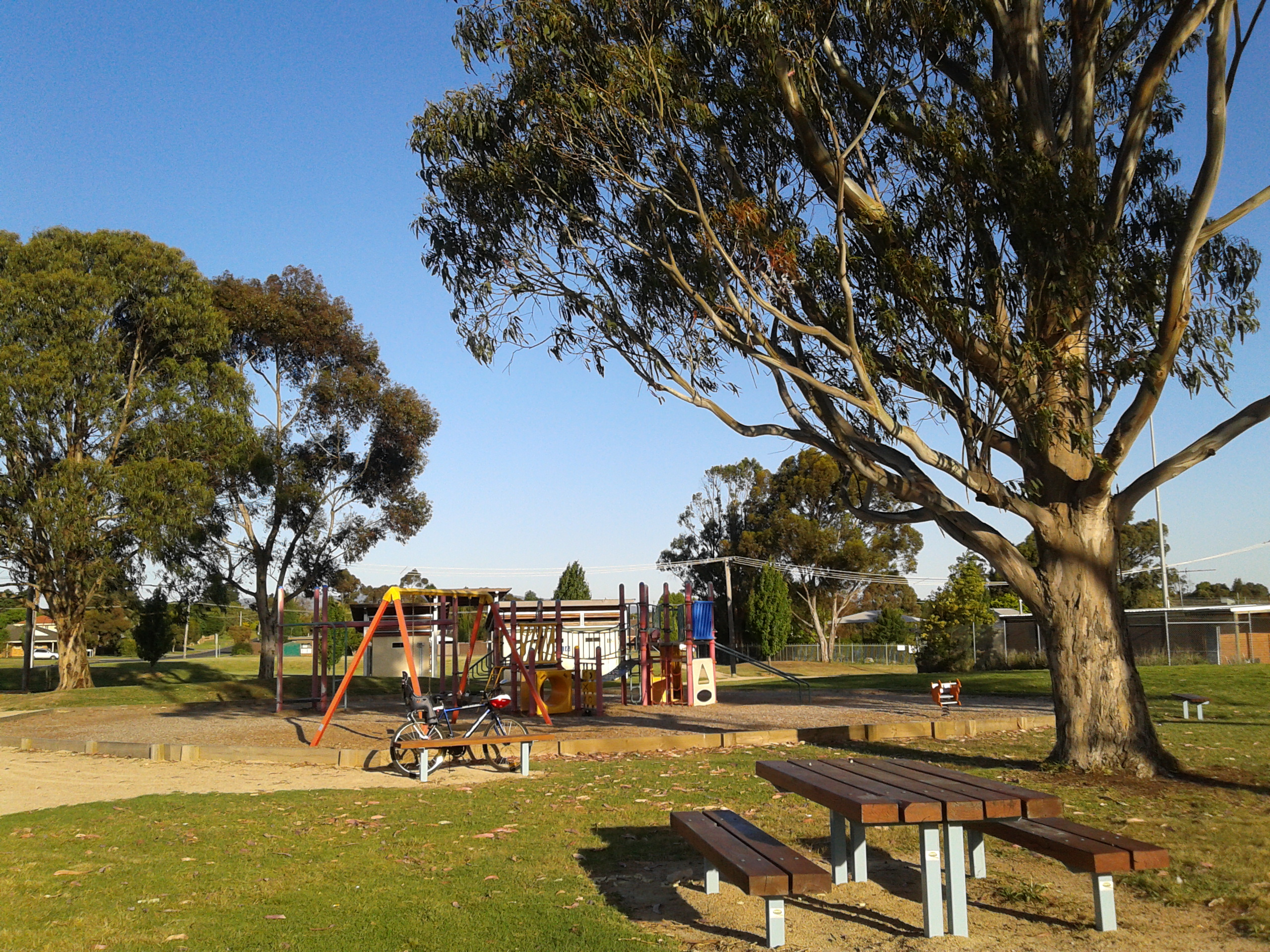

== See also ==
- List of reduplicated Australian place names
