= Paddy Shea =

Australian rules footballer (1886–1954)

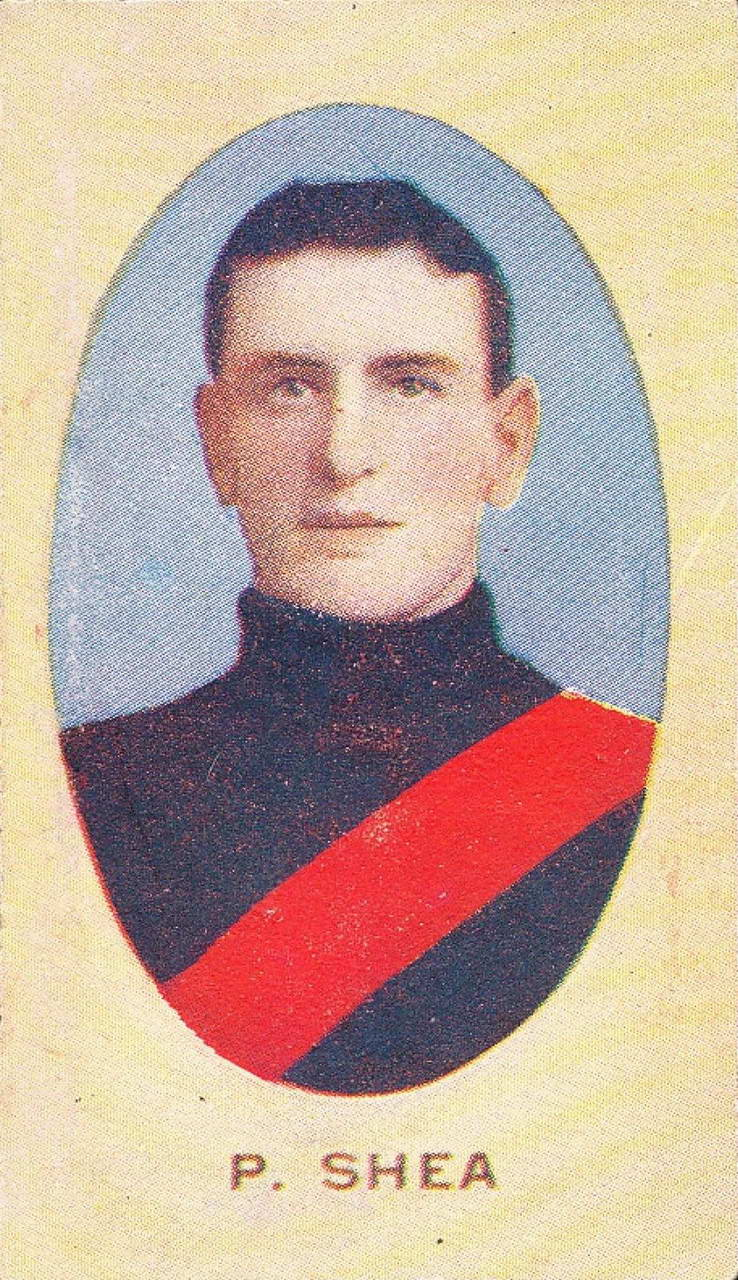
- Cigarette card of Shea in 2010

Personal information
- Full name: Patrick Augustus Shea
- Born: 17 March 1886; Clunes, Victoria
- Died: 29 May 1954 (aged 68); Northbridge, Sydney
- Original teams: CBC Parade, East Melbourne
- Debut: Round 2, 1904, Fitzroy vs. St Kilda, at Brunswick Street
- Height: 175 cm (5 ft 9 in)
- Weight: 76 kg (168 lb)

Playing career^{1}
Years	Club	Games (Goals)
1904	Fitzroy (VFL)	13 (8)
1905-1907	Boulder City (GFL)	
1908–15, 1918	Essendon (VFL)	142 (156)
1919	Essendon A (VFA)	9 (7)
Total		164 (171)
- ^{1} Playing statistics correct to the end of 1918.

Patrick Augustus Shea (17 March 1886 – 29 May 1954) was an Australian rules footballer who played for Fitzroy and Essendon in the Victorian Football League (VFL), and also a first-class cricketer with Victoria.

== Family ==
He was from a talented sporting family, with his brother Mark Francis Shea (1883–1939) also having a career at Fitzroy and Essendon.

His nephew, John Shea (1913–1986), played cricket with the Western Australia cricket team.

== Football ==
He played mostly as a half forward flanker and was one of the first players to use the 'banana kick' as well as the 'checkside' punt

"Paddy was an accomplished drop, punt and place kick and he was the only forward I knew (and still know [viz., in 1954]) who could make a ball swerve in the air from his boot as a bowler can from his hand.
He could stand near a boundary post and swing it with certaintv between the goal posts.
That master football tactician Jack Worrall, who coached Essendon after he left Carlton, had to see Paddy at practice before he was convinced of his ability.
Worrall had never before seen it in his many years association with the game as player and coach." – George Hale, in The Sporting Globe, 5 June 1954.

=== Fitzroy VFL) ===
Shea's VFL career began at Fitzroy in 1904.

=== Boulder City (GFA) ===
After one season he joined Goldfields Football Association club Boulder City, in Western Australia. He spent three years with Boulder City before returning to Victoria and making his Essendon debut in 1908.

=== Essendon (VFL) ===
This goal sense saw him top Essendon's goalkicking in 1909 with 40 majors. Such was his consistency up forward that he kicked a goal in each of his 17 games in the 1911 season but finished the year with just 25 goals. He was a member of Essendon premiership sides in 1911 and 1912. A Victorian interstate representative

He holds the record for most VFL goals kicked at the East Melbourne Cricket Ground, with 85.

=== Essendon Association (VFA) ===
Shea coached Essendon Association when it re-entered the post-war VFA competition in 1919.

== Cricket ==
As a cricketer Shea was a left-handed batsman and right-arm medium pace bowler.

He made three first-class appearances, his debut coming against Tasmania at the Melbourne Cricket Ground in 1912–13. Although Shea made little impact in the match, his Essendon premiership teammate Bill Sewart scored a century. His second match wasn't until seven years later and was a Sheffield Shield encounter against New South Wales at the SCG. He took the wickets of Test players Charlie Macartney and Arthur Mailey. His final match was against Queensland a week later and he finished his career with 84 runs at 14.00 and five wickets at 43.80.

He later moved to Sydney, and played cricket for the North Sydney Cricket Club.

== Death ==
He died (suddenly) at his residence in the Sydney suburb of Northbridge, on 29 May 1954.

== See also ==
- 1908 Melbourne Carnival
- List of Victoria first-class cricketers
