= Victorian Athletic League =

Sports league

The Victorian Athletic League organises professional footrunning events ranging from 70 to 3200 metres. The most famous of these events is the Stawell Gift which has been run since 1878 and hosts the richest footrace in Australia. Many other gifts are held around Victoria in country and metro locations including Ballarat, Bendigo, Wangaratta, Maryborough, Keilor, Yarrawonga, Ringwood, Rye and Olympic Park. Races are run under a handicap system which makes races competitive. Each race has a different handicap limit. Generally, the greater the sum of the prize money for a race, the less handicap is available, limiting the class of runners that can win. Runners are awarded prize money when making finals and bookmaking occurs at major meets.

== History of professional running ==
The oldest professional carnival in Victoria is the Maryborough Gift which celebrated its 162nd anniversary on New years Day 2025.

== Present day professional footrunning ==
Australia's best known footrace is the Stawell Gift, held at Easter since 1878. The other major Victorian carnivals that has been running for more than 100 years are the Maryborough and Wangaratta Carnivals. The Burnie Gift in Tasmania has been running since 1885.

The Wangaratta Gift has been running for 100 plus years since 1919 and like the Stawell Gift has only ever had a three year break for World War Two from 1942 to 1944, while the Maryborough Gift is the only carnival in Victoria to have actually run continuously since 1891.

The status as the richest carnival was challenged for a time in NSW with the running of the Botany Bay Gift Carnival which, in the 1990s. boasts total prize money of $120,000 and $70,000 for its main race with a $50,000 first prize. The excellent event, however, faded from the scene when sponsorship became difficult to maintain.

The Stawell Carnival has a total prize money pool of $90,000. The main race, the Stawell Gift, is over 120m and the winner receives $40,000.

There are many other carnivals and events conducted under handicap foot-running conditions throughout the nation each year.

Apart from Stawell, Wangaratta and Burnie, some of the more famous long-running carnivals are the Bay Sheffield Carnival in South Australia, Bendigo and Ballarat in Victoria, the Christmas Carnivals in North Western Tasmania, and an annual Gift on the Gold Coast in Queensland, Temora and Macksville Carnivals in New South Wales. Since the late 1980s athletics and the Olympic Games have been 'open', meaning that the so-called amateurs and professionals can all compete together for prize money without being penalised or discriminated against.

== History of the Victorian Athletic League ==
The Victorian Athletic League was established in 1895. Professional running in Australia began in the gold-mining days and boomed in areas where miners were prospecting and digging for gold. The miners raced against each other for the gift of a gold nugget offered by the local publican or mine owner. The miners raced over various distances but the main race was run over the Sheffield distance of 130 yards.

In the 1860s big money began to creep into the sport which attracted a wealth of athletic talent. Competitions took on a carnival atmosphere and crowds flocked to see local champions. In April 1878, nearly two thousand people witnessed the running of the first Stawell Easter Gift which was won by 24-year-old farmer W.J.Millard. The sport of professional running continued to grow. Big prize money and heavy betting attracted talented athletes as well as a range of shady characters.

By the early 1890s, the sport of professional running was in crisis. Athletes running under false names, hiding past performance, corrupt officials and other controversies led the need to establish a controlling body for professional running in Victoria. The Victorian Athletic League was formed on 15 April 1895 when RV Lewis of Benalla was elected president and Hastings Bell of Stawell was appointed secretary. Originally the League was administered from Stawell and formulated rules and regulations for country towns that conducted sports carnivals. It also acted as arbitrator in any disputes arising at those carnivals.

In 1902 a regular office was established in Melbourne and the Victorian Athletic League began to promote the sport of professional running. Carnivals were held in Melbourne and major Victorian towns and became extremely popular with the sporting public. 1917, a dispute over prize money led to a breakaway group, the Victorian Athletic Association, being formed and conducting event in opposition to the Victorian Athletic League. In 1921, through the mediation of the Stawell Athletic Club, the Victorian Athletic League and the Victorian Athletic Association were merged. ES Herring of Maryborough was elected president and Joe Bull appointed as secretary. The Victorian Athletic League established an office in Brunswick and held mid week sports meetings were held at White City in Tottenham, at the Exhibition Grounds and at the Monodrome. During the 1920s and 1930s, popularity of professional running grew tremendously and the VAL staged World Sprint Championships.

At the outbreak of World War II, many Victorian Athletic League clubs abandoned their meetings. However, the federal cabinet granted permission for the Victorian Athletic League to conduct footrunning at Maribyrnong for the benefit of athletes on leave from the armed forces and men employed in essential services. After World War II the Victorian Athletic League gained strength and had nearly fifteen hundred registered runners, three hundred trainers and was conducted sports carnivals at seventy centres across Victoria from mid November to early June.

By the early 1960s, interest in professional running had waned. The number of registered runners had declined and only twenty-eight carnivals were held across Victoria. In an effort to revive the sport, the Victorian Athletic League invited champion international athletes such as Bob Hayes, Alan Simpson and Robbie Hutchison to compete in Australia. In 1969, the St Kilda club staged the richest footrace in the world with a first prize of $2,000. In 1977, the Victorian Athletic League undertook substantial administrative changes becoming an incorporated company, establishing a computerised record of handicaps and results, and commissioning the use of an electronic race finish recording machine. After years of segregation between amateur and professional athletics, in 1986 saw the dawning of open athletics when Stawell Gift winners Chris Perry and John Dinan competed for Australia at the Commonwealth Games in Edinburgh.

In recent years, the Victorian Athletic League has extended its athletic format beyond club carnivals. The League moved into conducting special events such as the famous Dandy Dollar Dash at VFL/AFL football matches, the Moomba Mile run down Bourke Street in the Melbourne CBD, 400 metres series' during international cricket matches at the MCG and sprint events during horse races at Moonee Valley. In 2001, the Victorian Athletic League moved offices to be co-located with Athletics Victoria at Olympic Park in Melbourne. The League began to form a strong alliance with Athletics Victoria through formal affiliation, sharing resources and establishing a dual-registration process.

Matthew McDonough has been President of the Victorian Athletic League since 2021 and there is prize money offered for each race from $300 to $60,000 and a sash for every winner. The VAL provides a wide range of race categories and distances.

== Famous athletes ==
The following athletes are a small selection of well known and well performed athletes that have run in Australian Professional races under the (VAL, SAAL, QAL, NSWAL, TAL).

- Jack Donaldson
- Arthur Postle
- Cyril Mears
- Eddie Tolan USA
- Tom Miles
- Lynch Cooper
- Austin Robertson Sr.
- Frank Banner
- Eric Cumming
- Lance Mann
- Barney Ewell USA
- Herb McKenley: USA
- Bob Hayes USA
- Harry Downes
- Norman Yemm
- Robert De Castella
- Jana Rawlinson
- Tamsyn Lewis
- Bree Rizzo: Stawell Gift, Rye Gift, Keilor Gift, Maryborough Gift
- Nova Peris-Kneebone
- Melinda Gainsford-Taylor
- Madeleine Pape (Australian Olympian)
- Bola Lawal (Nigerian Olympian)
- George McNeill (Scotland)
- Jean-Louis Ravelomanantsoa (Madagascar)
- Rick Dunbar, 1963 Powderhall Gift
- Cathy Freeman: 1995 Stawell Gift, Stonnington Gift
- Linford Christie: 1999 Stawell Gift
- Josh Ross: 2003 Stawell Gift, Albury Gift, Parkdale Gift, Ballarat Gift
- Sally Pearson: 2007 Stawell Gift
- Michael Frater: 2012 Stawell Gift
- Asafa Powell: 2013 Stawell Gift
- Kim Collins: 2011, 2012 Stawell Gift
- Gout Gout: 2025 Stawell Gift
- Lachlan Kennedy: 2025 Stawell Gift

== Ballarat Gift ==
The Ballarat Gift has a strong history dating back to 1921 and was initially run by the Ballarat Athletic Association and promoted as "the greatest sports carnival in Australia" featuring athletics, cycling and tug of war events. The 1921 Ballarat Christmas Gift had a purse of £155, which was the richest stake in Australia and was held at the City Oval.

In 1923 and 1924, there was no professional athletic events, only amateur races, with the main event being the 100 yard amateur handicap.

Since 1949 it has been held at the City Oval, Sebastopol Oval and Northern Oval where VFL team the North Ballarat Roosters play. In 1949 the gift was won by Ted Marantelli.

There was a Wendouree Gift which appears to of commenced in the early 1950's.

During much of the 1970s and 1980s the only Gift conducted in Ballarat was the Sebastopol Gift. After the demise of the Sebastopol Gift in 1988, the Ballarat Gift returned to the VAL calendar in 1989 at the City Oval.

After traditionally being held in February since inception, in 2010 the Ballarat Gift was moved to the weekend after the Stawell Gift (April). With the assistance of the Goldfields Council, the Gift was worth a record $40,000. With all six Stawell Gift finalists entered, the 2010 Ballarat Gift final featured four of them including Stawell Gift winner Tom Burbidge. The Gift was won by 44-year-old Ballarat based, self trained athlete, Peter O'Dwyer. It was O'Dwyer's second Ballarat Gift after winning the race in 1996.

Past winners (since it was resurrected in 1989)

Ballarat Gift Winners
Year	Winner	City (from)	Handicap	Time (secs)
1921	L McArthur			11&9/10
1922	A C Pasco		13.00y	13.00
1923	W A Ward		10.00	9.4/5 (amateur)
1924	F E Sparks		10.50	9.4/5 (amateur)
1925-27				In recess
1928	Frank Spurrell	Glenferrie	8.50	12&3/5
1929-48				In recess
1949	E "Ted" P Marantelli		7.25	12.2
1950-1988				In recess?
1989	Peter Bennetto			
1990	Peter Bennetto			
1991	Chris Russell			
1992	Mark Ladbrook			
1993	Tony Birrell			
1994	Andrew Paull			
1995	Vince Cavallo	Wangaratta		12.2
1996	Peter O'Dwyer			
1997	Shaun White			
1998	Robert Ballard	Albury		
1999	Chris Pattison			
2000	Darren Paull			
2001	John Cara			
2002	Brett Blanco			
2003	Scott Beaven			
2004	Victor Oyanedal			
2005	Warwick Vale			
2006	Nathan Dixon			
2007	Nick Sampieri		9.75	12.38
2008	Bola Lawal	Nigeria	2.00	12.50
2009	Rod Matthews		10.50	12.49
2010	Peter O'Dwyer		10.25	12.44
2011	Andrew McCabe	Longreach		
2012	David Tinney	Geelong	8.50	12.28
2013	Glenn Ross		10.75	12.41
2014	Nathan Riali	Greensborough	5.75	12.59
2015	Craig Mair		12.00	12.36
2016	Noddy Angelakos		11.50	12.62
2017	Jasper Nettlefold		7.75	12.65
2018	Luke Mitchell		11.00	12.41
2019	Bikramjeet Singh		11.00	12.50
2020	Michael Hanna	Sydney		
2021				
2022	Duncan Cameron			
2023	Chad Perris	Canberra		
2024	Cooper Sherman	Ballarat		
2025	Jack Hale	Claremont	2.00	12.28
2026	Josh Lotsu			12.197
Year	Winner	City (from)	Handicap	Time (secs)

== Bendigo ==
The Bendigo Gift

In late 1922, the Bendigo Easter Carnival committee decided to host a professional Sheffield Handicap running race over 130 yards for the 1923 Bendigo Easter Gift, with an initial prize of £200 to be held at the Bendigo Agricultural Showgrounds as part of the Bendigo Easter Carnival, which included athletics, cycling, wood chopping and trotting.

In 1926 the Bendigo Gift prize money was £275.

In 1949 the Bendigo Easter Gift had a purse of £1000.

It appears that the Bendigo Gift changed its name to the Bendigo Guineas in 1952 and when Bill Freyer won the Guineas in 1956, there was a crowd of 20,000.

The Bendigo City 1000 Gift - 1947 to present day

In 1946 the Bendigo Commonwealth Athletic Club was formed and hosted the first Bendigo City One Thousand Gift in March 1947 and offered a purse of £1000 which was held on the Labour Day long weekend and from then onwards the race was commonly known as the Bendigo 1000 Gift.

In 1949, a staggering crowd of 25,000 attended the day one heats of the Bendigo 1000 carnival at the Bendigo Showgrounds.

In 1953, Essendon footballer, Norm McDonald won the 100 yards Australian Championships at the Bendigo 1000 Gift Carnival.

The event was later on moved to the Tom Flood reserve (Tom Flood was a former Bendigo Mayor and cyclist), one of the fastest grass tracks on the VAL circuit.

The Bendigo 1000 coincided with the Bendigo International Madison, a prestigious cycling event for 50 years, until the discontinuation of the Madison after the 2024 event.

From 2001 to 2024, excluding 2020-2023 where the Madison did not occur, Bendigo boasted the Bendigo Black Opal 400m, the richest 400m event in the world, attracting Australia's best 400m metre athletes, as well as the rich Bendigo Black Pearl 400m for the women.

In a break with tradition, the Bendigo Gift distance was increased from a 120 metre race to 200 metre race in 2023.

Title Name / Prize money

- 1947 to 1965: Bendigo 1000
- 1966: Bendigo 3000
- 1967 to 1977: Bendigo 2000
- 1978 to 198?: Bendigo 5000
- 1990's: Bendigo 10000
- 2020's: Bendigo Gift

Past winners of the ?

- 2003 Duncan Tippins
- 2004 Mark Howard
- 2005 Nathan Dixon
- 2006 Tommy Neim
- 2007 Nick Magree
- 2008 Glenn Stephens

Bendigo City 1000 Gift winners & trainers list: 1947 to present day

Bendigo Easter Gift Winners (130 yards)						Bendigo 1000 Gift Winners (130 yards)					
Year	Winner	City (from)	Handicap	Time (secs)	Ref	Winner	City (from)	Handicap	Time (secs)	Trainer	Ref
1923	Robin Gardner	Forth	12.50	11&3/5							
1924	John A Rose	Middle Park	13.00	12&1/5							
1925	H J Moy	Barkstead	11.25	12&1/5							
1926	W E E Mobbs	Alberton	10.00	12&1/5							
1927	Stan J Kenny	Essendon	9.50	12&2/5							
1928	H Falcke	Brunswick	11.00	12&4/5							
1929	E "Ted" J Henry	Carlton	9.25	12&3/5							
1930	J M Raven	South Australia	10.50	12&1/10							
1931	R E Rogers	Essendon	10.50	12&1/5							
1932	Leslie H Neal	Yarravile	14.75	12.0							
1933	Cyril G Heath	Baileston Est, (Nagambie)	8.75	11&1/4							
1934	H I Smith	Essendon	10.50	11&4/5							
1935	C J Roberts	NSW	10.00	12.00							
1936	L J Williams	Bendigo	12.25	11&8/10							
1937	Patrick R. Rodgers	Nyngan	11.00	11&4/5							
1938	J N Whiffin	Ivanhoe	10.50	12.00							
1939	Jack Kelly	Mildura	13.50	11&14/16							
1940	Jim T Smith	Brunswick	10.25	11&3/5							
1941	J J Hawkins	Axedale	6.75	12.0							
1942-45	In recess>WW2										
1946	Tommy Deane	Wahring	7.00	11&9/10		Commenced in 1947					
1947	Ossie Burton	Newmarket	9.75	12.1		Don Cameron	St. Peters	7.75	11&9/10	Les Sullivan	
1948	Laurie Kerr	Melb	8.25	12.00		John Stoney	St. Kilda	5.50	11.7	Jim McNeil	
1949	Bern Hogan	Golden Square	8.50	12.1		Alex N. Wilson	Murtoa	8.00	11.8	Bernie Jones	
1950	Frank Donohue	Adelaide	10.75	11&9/10		Sam Baldwin	Broken Hill	8.75	11.7	Bill Ellis	
1951	J P Patterson	NSW	9.00	12.00		Roy Beckwith	Essendon	8.75	11.9	Ferg Speakman	
1952	Lance Mann	Albury	6.50	11&8/10		David Hobbs	Brighton	9.50	11.6	Bob Goldsworthy	
1953	Bob Stringer	Kyneton	4.00	12.2		Bob Stringer	Kyneton	6.50	12.3	Bert Stringer	
1954	Jack Trusler	Footscray	9.25	11.8		Fred Brown	Windsor	10.5	11.7	E "Ted" Marantelli	
1955	Les W Stock	Ascot Vale	9.75	11.9		Lou Gillon	Hobart			Leo Jarvis	
1956	Bill Freyer	Port Melbourne	9.00	12.00		Harry J Simmons	Melbourne	&.25	12.00	Ron Vincent	
1957						Kingsley "Gus" Punton	Glenroy	8.50	12.2	?	
1958						Terry J Clarke	Bendigo	3.5		Lou Marrinier	
1959						R "Bob" Tormey	Nth Melb	11.50	11.8	Ferg Speakman	
1960						Ray Yeoman	Mansfield	4.25	12.1	Jack Cumming	
1961						Vic Beams	Armadale	7.25		Jack Arnold	
1962						Neil Blinman	NSW	4.25	11.9	Husky Moore	
1963						R "Bob" Wishart	Melbourne	7.00	12.2	Jim West	
1964						Kevin Portch	Port Macquarie	4.5	12.1	Husky Moore	
1965						Noel Pattison	Shepparton	5.75	11.9	Alan Goodlet	
1966						Tony Polinelli	Geelong	10.00	11.6	Arthur Edgerton	
1967						David Grubb	SA	6.5		Bill Neil	
1968						Don Wilson	Reservoir	5.25	12.1	Jack Clarke	
1969						Alan Murphy	Reservoir	6.5	12.2	Alan Partington	
1970						Geoff Wilcox	Clayton	6.75	11.8	Allen O'Conner	
1971						Brian Parker	Mulgrave	11.00		Vin Sabbatucci	
1972						Tim Connick	Noble Park		11.8	Norm McLeod	
1973						Peter Rogers	S A	8.50	11.6	Bill Neil	
1974						Tony Jakeman	ACT	7.00	11.8	Bob Gulliver	
1975						Col Anderson	Glenelg	7.00	12.3	Bill Neil	
1976						John McInerney	Adelaide	8.5		Bill Neil	
1977						Evan Armstrong	Hampton	8.00	11.9	Vin Sabbatucci	
1978						Graham Goudie	Tullamarine	7.75	12.00	Bob Goldsworthy	
1979						Frank Cornish	Bendigo	10.50		John Burke	
1980						David Tilburn				Jack Clarke	
1981						Adrian Lingford	Keilor	6.75	11.9	Neil King	
1982						Brian Marantelli				John Hawke	
1983						Matthew Webster				N King/E Armstrong	
1984						Chris Perry				N King/E Armstrong	
1985						Chris Pegg		7.75		N King/E Armstrong	
1986						Matthew Webster				N King/E Armstrong	
1987						John Evans		7.5	12.75	Graham Goldsworthy	
1988						Glenn Kendall				Monty Hirst	
1989						Rodney Green	Corowa, NSW			Ken Eales	
1990						Simon Smith				Jim Bradley	
1991						Todd Ireland				Gary Barker	
1992						Tony Birrell				Graham Goldsworthy	
1993						Tim Mason				Graham Goldsworthy	
1994						Chris Ferreira				Peter Robbie	
1995						Ben Hamilton				Rupert Arnold	
1996						Rodney Green				Ken Eales	
1997						Kevin Hanlon				Evan Armstrong	
1998						Robert Lehman				Michael Benoit	
1999						Kelly Sheldrick				Barry McLeod	
2000						Braden Fraser				Brian Hodgson	
2001						Glenn Stephens				Daryl Nettleton	
2002						Shane McKenzie				Tom Schreier	
2003						Jarrad Meagher				Brian Morgan	
2004						Cam Dunbar				Todd Ireland	
2005						Duncan Tippins				Paul Young	
2006						Shane Ezard				Mark McDowell	
2007						Peter Dudkiewicz		10.00	12.58	Greg Bisinella	
2008						Daniel Steinhauser		6.50	12.39	Marcus Arnold	
2009						Javad Asghari		11.00	12.338	Andrew Muhlhan	
2010						Nathan Fox		9.75	12.787	Robert Lehmann	
2011						Tim Rooke				Eric Hollingsworth	
2012						Peter Walsh				Self Trained	
2013						Matthew Harvey				Andrew Muhlhan	
2014						Robert Spencer		8.50	12.288	Mark Hipworth	
2015						Leigh Phelan		10.75	12.398	Max Binnington	
2016						Dean Dobric		10.25	12.339	John Nicolosi	
2017						Michael Romanin				John Nicolosi	
2018						Rupert Lugo		10.75	12.268	Nick Fieldler	
2019						Liam Dooley				John Hilditch	
2020						Hamish Adams				Todd Ireland	
2021											
2022											
2023											
2024											
2025											
2026											
Year	Winner	City (from)	Handicap	Time (secs)	Ref	Winner	City (from)	Handicap	Time (secs)	Trainer	Ref

== Burramine Gift ==
The Burramine Gift commenced at the Yarrawonga Showgrounds in 1952, but the event had its origins five years earlier with an athletics carnival held in a local paddock to raise some money for a new set of football jumpers, with the event being held at the Grove Oval, Yarrawonga from 1953 onwards.

Famous American Olympic sprinter Herb McKenley ran at Burramine in 1954, but broke down 20 yards from the finish line to finish second.

The Burramine Gift distance changed in 1974 from 130 yards to 120 metres.

The club only ever had two secretaries, the late Tom Hopkins and Frances Connell. Mr Peter Lawless senior was club president from 1967, which was then taken over by Peter Lawless junior in 2001.

Life Membership was awarded to both Peter Lawless and James Cummins in 2014.

The club made the difficult decision fold at its annual general meeting in July 2014.

Burramine Gift Winners
Year	Winner	City (from)	Handicap	Time (secs)	1st Prize
1952	Eric Cumming	Acheron	2.50y	12.0	$50
1953	George F Sinclair	North Melbourne	12.00		£75
1954	George F Sinclair	Richmond	12.50	12.00	£120
1955	Mick C McCarthy	Yarrawonga	11.50	12.20	
1956	Kevin Hilet	Yarrawonga	8.50	12&2/16	
1957	Jim P Doolan	Wangaratta	9.00	12.10	
1958	W Dinsdale	Albury	8.00	12.00	
1959	R "Bob" Tormey	Nth Melbourne	9.50	12.20	
1960	J Kent	Mentone	6.00	12.10	
1961	Lance T Watters	Shepparton	8.50	12.20	
1962	Marcus Arnold	Cheltenham	6.00	12.20	
1963	A L McKellar	Hawthorn	8.75	12.10	
1964	J Roche	Glen Iris	6.00	12.10	
1965	T J Clarke	Avondale Heights	1.00	12.20	
1966	Ray Thomas	Albury	8.75	12.10	
1967	F P Tier	Wagga Wagga	5.50	12.00	
1968	Tom Lowe	Yarrawonga	14.00	12.30	$200
1969	J A Mitchell	Greensborough	7.75	12.00	
1970	Maurie Purss	Albury	4.75	12.00	
1971	Neil Besanko	Melbourne	5.50	11.90	
1972	Neil Besanko	Melbourne	5.00	12.10	
1973	P F McNamara	Culgoa	7.50	11.90	
1974	B O'Neil	Echuca	7.20m	12.00	
1975	M P Burns	Moreland	8.75	12.10	
1976	M P Burns	Moreland	7.25	12.20	
1977	B O'Neil	Echuca	6.25	12.50	
1978	R Chambers	South Yarra	8.00	12.20	
1979	A Brown	Queensland	8.00	12.30	
1980	B Mathews	Broadmeadows	7.75	12.20	
1981	Adrian Fury	Marrar	7.00	12.20	
1982	P Elliott	Greensborough	6.00	12.52	
1983	B J F Mueller	Carlton	5.00	12.40	
1984	R H Smith	Belmont	7.75	12.40	
1985	C D Marks	East Keilor	8.50	12.50	
1986	G F Harrison	Melbourne	6.00	12.33	
1987	K W Beaton	Belmont	4.50	12.32	
1988	A J Grima	West Brunswick	6.00	12.44	
1989	I P Marchesi	Ringwood	8.50	12.55	
1990	J R Evans	Hughesdale	6.00	12.33	
1991	A J Kenshole	Doncaster	6.50	12.45	
1992	M B Kelly	Moonee Ponds	8.75	12.62	
1993	Walter Pasquali	Wangaratta	6.25	12.49	
1994	A Martin	Wendoree	8.25	12.24	
1995	R Calleja	Albury	5.00	12.22	
1996	P Harloff	North Albury	10.50	12.18	
1997	M Moresi	Wheelers Hill	6.00	12.18	
1998	J Montgomery	Box Hill South	7.50	12.18	
1999	D Vodusek	Yarrawonga	8.50	12.44	
2000	Greg O'Keeffe	Wangaratta	10.00	12.27	
2001	Everton Evelyn	Barbados	1.00	12.63	
2002	C Brown	Tullamarine	6.00	12.37	
2003	Clayton Fraser	Wangaratta	11.50	12.49	
2004	Z Frangos	Ballarat	6.25	12.26	
2005	Justin Lewis	Canterbury			
2006	Paul Tancredi	Essendon	8.50	12.32	$4,800
2008	Bola Lawal	Nigeria	1.00	12.47	
2009	P Walsh	Corio	8.00	12.44	
2010	Derek Collinge	Canberra	9.25	12.34	$5,000
2011	Robert Vidler	Hoppers Crossing		12.56	
2013	Jarred Linder				
2014	Mark Hignett	Torquay	12.00		$5,000
Year	Winner	City (from)	Handicap	Time (secs)	1st Prize

== Castlemaine Gift ==
The history of professional foot running in and around the Castlemaine area has existed since the 1880's. In 1885, a 120 yard Sheffield Handicap race was conducted by the Castlemaine Easter Sports Carnival and won by J Moore of Brighton. The Gift has been running intermittently since 1922 and held at the Camp Reserve, run initially over the Sheffield distance of 130 yards. The gift was initially held on Boxing Day between 1922 and 1937.

Castlemaine Gift Winners
Year	Winner	City (from)	Handicap	Time (secs)	1st Prize
1922	Richard J Morton	Burnley		12.00	
1923	J W Dudley	Castlemaine	16.00		£100
1924	W "Bill" Darby	East Malvern	6.50	12.2/5	
1925	A Dobrigh		12.00	12.3/5	
1926	D Patience	Albert Park	11.00	12.00	
1927	E J Henry	Carlton	10.50	11.3/4	£100
1928	S S Glover	Footscray	10.50	12.00	
1929	T Little	Croxton	11.00	12&2/16	£100
1930	Tim Banner	NSW	5.50	12.00	
1931	H Donnolly	Coburg	10.50	11.11/16	
1932	Frank J Buckley	Castlemaine	12.50		
1933					
1934	J T Scarlett	Hamilton	14.00		
1935	C B Jewell	Yarraville	13.75	11.10/16	
30.03.36	Ron McCann	Castlemaine	6.25	11.3/4	
26.12.36	Cyril G Heath	Baileston Est	4.25	12.4/16	
1937	Ray Wartman	Melbourne	11.25	12.00	
1938-64	In recess				
10.04.65	Jim Summers		8.75	12.1	£100
19.12.65	Ricky Dunbar	Scotland	2.00	11.9	£100
1966-93	In recess?				
2017	Daniel Sonsini	Wantirna	7.00	12.37	$5000
2018	Sam Baird	Castlemaine	6.50	12.37	
2019					
2020	Tim Rosen	East Bentleigh			
2021	Luke Houlihan	South Australia	5.50	12.27	
2022					
2023	Kevin Brittain	Geelong		12.19	$5000
2024	Kevin Brittain	Geelong		12.32	
2025	Tim Rosen	East Bentleigh	15.50	12.392	
2026					

== Horsham Gift ==
There was a Horsham Gift in 1876 and was it won by a local runner, Charlie Smith. The Horsham Athletic Club's annual Boxing Day Carnival commenced in 1881 with the main event initially being the 130 yards Horsham Handicap and was held at the Horsham Showgrounds. The Horsham Gift was revived in 1926 after being in recess for many years.

== Maryborough Gift ==
A list of winners of the Maryborough Gift dating back to 1891.

- Maryborough Gift - 1891 to present day

== Ringwood Gift ==
Hosted by the Ringwood Professional Athletic club, the Ringwood Gift has previously been held on grass but since 2010 has been run on a synthetic surface at the Ringwood Athletics Track. Having previously held slots in late January, the Ringwood Gift is now situated in Late March/Early April, serving as the last meeting before the Stawell Gift. The Gift distance has historically been over 400m, and whilst the race has previously been run as an open race, it has since been split into a men's and women's event, with the women's gift race now being held over 300m as of 2025. Due to athletes being in peak form due to the close proximity of Stawell, and a synthetic track, fast times are usually seen at Ringwood.

Ringwood Open / Men's (400 metres) Gift Winners
2003	Evan King	22m	46.69
2004	Gene Mawer	Unknown	Unknown
2005	Jason Hooper	22m	47.74
2006	Jason Boulton	30m	46.63
2007	Cara White	55m	45.54
2008	Derek Collinge	22m	47.62
2009	Daniel Steinhauser	13m	46.04
2010	Shane Woodrow	27m	46.27
2011	Tabitha West	48m	46.31
2012	David Girolamo	50m	45.87
2013	Jay Blake	44m	45.97
2014	Luke Stevens	16m	44.91
2015	Lawrence Coop	40m	45.32
2016	Greg Mitchell	25m	45.88
2017	David Haigh	53m	46.21
2018	Not held	Not held	Not held
2019	Jacob Reed	23m	46.44
2020	Not held	Not held	Not held
2021	Cameron Yorke	34m	47.23
2022	Jake Stevens	28m	45.89
2023	Greg Mitchell	30m	46.52
2024	Nick Howard	Unknown	Unknown
2025	Noddy Angelakos	52m	46.01

Ringwood Women's (300 metres) Gift: Winners
Year	Winner	Handicap	Time (secs)
2021	Hannah Lindstrom	34m	52.86
2022	Gabriella Boulton	39m	53.51
2023	Lucy Young	34m	53.93
2024	Kate Walker	Unknown	Unknown
2025	Gabby Sullivan	46m	36.99 (300m)
2026			

== Rye Gift ==
Held on the second Saturday of January every year, the Rye Gift attracts tourists celebrating the Christmas period and New Year. It has bookies and the track for the 120m is on a slight decline.

Rye Gift: Men's Winners
Year	Winner	Handicap	Time (secs)
2000	R. Devalle	Unknown	Unknown
2001	M. Doresi	Unknown	Unknown
2002	Chris Tuohy	Unknown	Unknown
2003	Craig Foley	11m	12.42
2004	Cam Dunbar	Unknown	Unknown
2005	Craig Brown	7m	12.38
2006	Daniel Burgess	4m	12.24
2007	Matthew Callard	8.75m	12.32
2008	Peter O'Dwyer	10m	12.23
2009	Rhett Mettford	4.75m	12.45
2010	Douglas Greenough	10.25m	12.25
2011	Craig Rollinson	8.25m	12.49
2012	Cam Dunbar	7.75m	12.45
2013	Bros Kelly	8m	12.43
2014	Matt Carter	2m	12.35
2015	Paul Tancredi	8m	12.46
2016	Noddy Angelakos	12.25m	12.44
2017	Nathan Riali	4m	12.56
2018	Maddie Coates	15m	12.28
2019	Aaron Leferink	5.75m	12.35
2020	Matt Burleigh	10m	12.27
2021	Not Held	Not Held	Not Held
2022	Not Held	Not Held	Not Held
2023	Nicholas Antonino	8.25m	12.45
2024	Jake Ireland	5m	12.57
2025	Jesse Cordoma	8.25m	12.15

Rye Gift: Women's Winners
Year	Winner	Handicap	Time (secs)
2000	Anne Fearnley	Unknown	Unknown
2001	Jackie Chehade	Unknown	Unknown
2002	Katie Moore	Unknown	Unknown
2003	Anna Deery	9m	14.14
2004	Anna Deery	Unknown	Unknown
2005	Anna Deery	2.75m	14.02
2006	Cara White	9.5m	13.70
2007	Katrina Steward	2.75m	14.03
2008	Morgan Dean	7m	13.90
2009	Amanda Crook	9.5m	14.03
2010	Katie Moore	2.75m	14.08
2011	Alice Platten	8.25m	14.23
2012	Eleni Gilden	10.75m	14.33
2013	Stephanie Mollica	4.75m	14.17
2014	Jessica Payne	9.75m	14.11
2015	Taylah Perry	9.25m	14.05
2016	Celia Cosgriff	12.25m	14.16
2017	Ebony Lane	7m	14.10
2018	Holly Dobbyn	3.75m	14.19
2019	Kysha Praciak	7m	14.16
2020	Bree Rizzo	-0.25m	13.83
2021	Not Held	Not Held	Not Held
2022	Not Held	Not Held	Not Held
2023	Bella Pasquali	7.25m	13.85
2024	Amber Van Eede	13m	13.70
2025	Alexia Loizou	3.5m	13.46

== Shepparton Gift ==
The Shepparton Gift commenced in 1899 as the Sheffield Handicap, later renamed the Shepparton Gift, which was held at the Shepparton Recreation Reserve (Deakin Reserve) from 1906 onwards.

== Stawell Gift ==
The Stawell Gift is considered the country's most prestigious professional footrace. Over 120m it is televised across the country and thousands are at Stawell every year at Easter.

View the Men's Stawell Gift Winners: 1878 to 2026, which includes the handicap and time of each winner.

- 2025 John Evans, Adelaide (SA)
- 2024 Jack Lacey, Ringwood (VIC)
- 2023 Ryan Tarrant, Melbourne (VIC)
- 2022 Harrison Kerr, Ringwood (VIC)
- 2021 Edward Ware, Melbourne (VIC)
- 2020 COVID 19 (No Race)
- 2019 Dhruv Rodrigues Chico, Melbourne (VIC)
- 2018 Jacob Despard, Tasmania
- 2017 Matthew Rizzo, Langwarrin (VIC)
- 2016 Isaac Dunmall, East Brisbane (QLD)
- 2015 Murray Goodwin, Burleigh Heads (QLD)
- 2014 Luke Versace, Melbourne (VIC)
- 2013 Andrew Robinson, Launceston (TAS)
- 2012 Matthew Wiltshire, Ballarat (VIC)
- 2011 Mitchell Williams-Swain, Gold Coast (QLD)
- 2010 Tom Burbidge, Canberra (ACT)
- 2009 Aaron Stubbs, Kurrawa (QLD)
- 2008 Sam Jamieson, Williamstown (VIC)
- 2007 Nathan Allen, Toowoomba (QLD)
- 2006 Adrian Mott, Essendon (VIC)
- 2005 Joshua Ross, Gillieston(NSW)
- 2004 Jason Hunte, Barbados
- 2003 Joshua Ross, North Lambton (NSW)
- 2002 Stuart Uhlmann, Cedar Grove (QLD)
- 2001 Andrew Pym, South Riverview (NSW)
- 2000 Jarram Pearce, Wodonga (VIC)
- 1999 Rod Matthews, Buninyong (VIC)
- 1998 Dale Seers, Edithvale (VIC)
- 1997 Daniel Millard, Mt Gambier (SA)
- 1996 Steve Hutton, Alberton (SA)
- 1995 Glenn Crawford, Katamatite (VIC)
- 1994 Rod Lewis, Ringwood (VIC)
- 1993 Jason Richardson, Caulfield South (VIC)
- 1992 Andrew McManus, Essendon (VIC)
- 1991 Steve Brimacombe, Eltham (VIC)
- 1990 Dean Capobianco, Kalamunda (WA)

History of Stawell Gift finalists:

== Wangaratta Gift ==
The Wangaratta Gift was originally run over 130 yards, but is now run over 120 metres and has been held annually since 1919 at the Wangaratta Showgrounds, where all race results can be viewed. This event attracts both VAL and NSWAL competitors because of the close proximity to the Victorian and NSW border region.

== Whitfield Sports Day ==
This annual sports day commenced in 1905 and was held at the Whitfield Recreation Reserve, with main event being the 130 yards Sheffield Handicap. This event appears to of run between 1905 and around 1950.

- Whitefield Sheffield Handicap Winners List

== Whorouly Gift ==
The Whorouly Sports Day appears to of commenced in 1935 which involved athletics, cycling on the banked dirt bike track, equestrian and wood chopping and was held on the Whorouly Recreation Reserve. The main event was the 130 yard Sheffield Handicap Whorouly Gift.
