= 1971 VFL season =

75th season of the Victorian Football League (VFL)

1971 VFL premiership season
- Teams: 12
- Premiers: Hawthorn; 2nd premiership
- Minor premiers: Hawthorn; 3rd minor premiership
- Consolation series: Melbourne; 1st Consolation series win
- Brownlow Medallist: Ian Stewart (Richmond)
- Coleman Medallist: Peter Hudson (Hawthorn)

Attendance
- Matches played: 136
- Total attendance: 3,326,436 (24,459 per match)
- Highest: 118,192

The 1971 VFL season was the 75th season of the Victorian Football League (VFL), the highest level senior Australian rules football competition in Victoria. The season featured twelve clubs, ran from 3 April until 25 September, and comprised a 22-game home-and-away season followed by a finals series featuring the top four clubs.

The premiership was won by the Hawthorn Football Club for the second time, after it defeated St Kilda by seven points in the 1971 VFL Grand Final. Hawthorn full-forward Peter Hudson kicked 150 goals for the season, equalling the all-time record set by Bob Pratt (South Melbourne) in 1934.

== Background ==
In 1971, the VFL competition consisted of twelve teams of 18 on-the-field players each, plus two substitute players, known as the 19th man and the 20th man. A player could be substituted for any reason; however, once substituted, a player could not return to the field of play under any circumstances.

Teams played each other in a home-and-away season of 22 rounds; matches 12 to 22 were the "home-and-way reverse" of matches 1 to 11.

Once the 22 round home-and-away season had finished, the 1971 VFL Premiers were determined by the specific format and conventions of the Page–McIntyre system.

== Home-and-away season ==
=== Round 1 ===
Home team	Home team score	Away team	Away team score	Venue	Crowd	Date
Melbourne	24.21 (165)	South Melbourne	7.18 (60)	MCG	28,727	3 April 1971
Geelong	8.9 (57)	St Kilda	21.25 (151)	Kardinia Park	20,771	3 April 1971
Fitzroy	14.15 (99)	Richmond	22.18 (150)	Junction Oval	18,386	3 April 1971
Essendon	10.12 (72)	Hawthorn	13.18 (96)	Windy Hill	19,214	3 April 1971
Collingwood	25.10 (160)	Footscray	11.11 (77)	Victoria Park	27,829	3 April 1971
North Melbourne	18.16 (124)	Carlton	14.14 (98)	Arden Street Oval	20,399	3 April 1971

=== Round 2 ===
Home team	Home team score	Away team	Away team score	Venue	Crowd	Date
Carlton	20.9 (129)	Essendon	9.15 (69)	Princes Park	30,480	10 April 1971
South Melbourne	12.20 (92)	Geelong	16.14 (110)	Lake Oval	17,090	10 April 1971
Hawthorn	14.13 (97)	Fitzroy	7.11 (53)	Glenferrie Oval	15,310	10 April 1971
Footscray	8.15 (63)	Melbourne	16.11 (107)	Western Oval	20,378	12 April 1971
St Kilda	16.12 (108)	North Melbourne	12.8 (80)	Moorabbin Oval	24,174	12 April 1971
Richmond	10.9 (69)	Collingwood	16.10 (106)	MCG	82,172	12 April 1971

=== Round 3 ===
Home team	Home team score	Away team	Away team score	Venue	Crowd	Date
Footscray	14.15 (99)	South Melbourne	14.9 (93)	Western Oval	15,003	17 April 1971
Fitzroy	17.26 (128)	North Melbourne	14.10 (94)	Junction Oval	8,917	17 April 1971
Hawthorn	16.19 (115)	Geelong	16.11 (107)	Glenferrie Oval	14,090	17 April 1971
Essendon	9.12 (66)	Collingwood	9.12 (66)	Windy Hill	22,421	17 April 1971
Melbourne	19.13 (127)	Carlton	15.10 (100)	MCG	42,885	17 April 1971
Richmond	10.8 (68)	St Kilda	6.13 (49)	VFL Park	33,489	17 April 1971

=== Round 4 ===
Home team	Home team score	Away team	Away team score	Venue	Crowd	Date
Collingwood	19.20 (134)	Fitzroy	12.9 (81)	Victoria Park	25,759	24 April 1971
South Melbourne	5.9 (39)	Richmond	20.13 (133)	Lake Oval	18,895	24 April 1971
St Kilda	10.9 (69)	Hawthorn	18.19 (127)	Moorabbin Oval	25,153	24 April 1971
North Melbourne	14.15 (99)	Footscray	13.14 (92)	Arden Street Oval	13,972	24 April 1971
Geelong	13.8 (86)	Carlton	13.21 (99)	Kardinia Park	23,555	24 April 1971
Melbourne	10.18 (78)	Essendon	6.7 (43)	VFL Park	27,342	24 April 1971

=== Round 5 ===
Home team	Home team score	Away team	Away team score	Venue	Crowd	Date
Fitzroy	14.8 (92)	Melbourne	17.18 (120)	Junction Oval	12,363	1 May 1971
Essendon	21.15 (141)	Geelong	16.12 (108)	Windy Hill	16,435	1 May 1971
Collingwood	16.15 (111)	North Melbourne	10.11 (71)	Victoria Park	22,546	1 May 1971
Carlton	13.18 (96)	St Kilda	11.17 (83)	Princes Park	24,027	1 May 1971
Richmond	14.17 (101)	Footscray	17.19 (121)	MCG	23,758	1 May 1971
Hawthorn	12.21 (93)	South Melbourne	6.9 (45)	VFL Park	16,206	1 May 1971

=== Round 6 ===
Home team	Home team score	Away team	Away team score	Venue	Crowd	Date
North Melbourne	12.12 (84)	Richmond	22.14 (146)	Arden Street Oval	13,047	8 May 1971
Footscray	18.5 (113)	Hawthorn	16.11 (107)	Western Oval	19,205	8 May 1971
St Kilda	14.25 (109)	Essendon	9.11 (65)	Moorabbin Oval	21,604	8 May 1971
Melbourne	10.12 (72)	Collingwood	18.19 (127)	MCG	80,231	8 May 1971
South Melbourne	13.14 (92)	Carlton	14.10 (94)	Lake Oval	17,171	8 May 1971
Geelong	13.13 (91)	Fitzroy	20.16 (136)	VFL Park	11,432	8 May 1971

=== Round 7 ===
Home team	Home team score	Away team	Away team score	Venue	Crowd	Date
Melbourne	22.17 (149)	North Melbourne	15.14 (104)	MCG	21,069	15 May 1971
Hawthorn	21.19 (145)	Richmond	12.6 (78)	Glenferrie Oval	22,956	15 May 1971
Fitzroy	11.16 (82)	St Kilda	13.14 (92)	Junction Oval	17,573	15 May 1971
Essendon	12.17 (89)	South Melbourne	16.9 (105)	Windy Hill	17,055	15 May 1971
Collingwood	15.16 (106)	Geelong	14.8 (92)	Victoria Park	25,525	15 May 1971
Carlton	12.19 (91)	Footscray	11.13 (79)	VFL Park	29,195	15 May 1971

=== Round 8 ===
Home team	Home team score	Away team	Away team score	Venue	Crowd	Date
Geelong	10.12 (72)	Melbourne	14.22 (106)	Kardinia Park	20,247	22 May 1971
South Melbourne	13.11 (89)	Fitzroy	19.19 (133)	Lake Oval	15,147	22 May 1971
Footscray	17.17 (119)	Essendon	12.7 (79)	Western Oval	21,295	22 May 1971
St Kilda	20.15 (135)	Collingwood	13.10 (88)	Moorabbin Oval	38,127	22 May 1971
Richmond	16.26 (122)	Carlton	9.16 (70)	MCG	52,783	22 May 1971
North Melbourne	7.10 (52)	Hawthorn	22.15 (147)	VFL Park	14,860	22 May 1971

=== Round 9 ===
Home team	Home team score	Away team	Away team score	Venue	Crowd	Date
Melbourne	10.10 (70)	St Kilda	10.7 (67)	MCG	39,380	29 May 1971
Fitzroy	17.17 (119)	Footscray	10.18 (78)	Junction Oval	12,255	29 May 1971
Collingwood	15.10 (100)	South Melbourne	10.6 (66)	Victoria Park	20,350	29 May 1971
Carlton	4.12 (36)	Hawthorn	14.12 (96)	Princes Park	29,250	29 May 1971
North Melbourne	16.28 (124)	Geelong	16.13 (109)	Arden Street Oval	7,335	29 May 1971
Essendon	13.11 (89)	Richmond	17.11 (113)	VFL Park	16,300	29 May 1971

=== Round 10 ===
Home team	Home team score	Away team	Away team score	Venue	Crowd	Date
Essendon	13.18 (96)	North Melbourne	8.15 (63)	Windy Hill	14,864	5 June 1971
Carlton	13.12 (90)	Fitzroy	10.15 (75)	Princes Park	24,000	5 June 1971
South Melbourne	9.6 (60)	St Kilda	18.23 (131)	Lake Oval	16,069	5 June 1971
Richmond	15.16 (106)	Melbourne	11.9 (75)	MCG	48,708	5 June 1971
Hawthorn	15.17 (107)	Collingwood	7.13 (55)	Glenferrie Oval	28,450	5 June 1971
Footscray	19.10 (124)	Geelong	18.14 (122)	VFL Park	11,673	5 June 1971

=== Round 11 ===
Home team	Home team score	Away team	Away team score	Venue	Crowd	Date
North Melbourne	12.17 (89)	South Melbourne	13.20 (98)	Arden Street Oval	9,454	14 June 1971
Geelong	12.11 (83)	Richmond	20.13 (133)	Kardinia Park	23,388	14 June 1971
Melbourne	10.14 (74)	Hawthorn	14.10 (94)	MCG	52,256	14 June 1971
St Kilda	17.16 (118)	Footscray	9.5 (59)	Moorabbin Oval	22,488	14 June 1971
Fitzroy	17.13 (115)	Essendon	8.9 (57)	Junction Oval	14,212	14 June 1971
Collingwood	24.14 (158)	Carlton	11.7 (73)	VFL Park	50,246	14 June 1971

=== Round 12 ===
Home team	Home team score	Away team	Away team score	Venue	Crowd	Date
Carlton	16.18 (114)	North Melbourne	3.5 (23)	Princes Park	13,300	19 June 1971
St Kilda	14.15 (99)	Geelong	3.3 (21)	Moorabbin Oval	14,181	19 June 1971
Richmond	6.11 (47)	Fitzroy	8.17 (65)	MCG	24,831	19 June 1971
Hawthorn	14.20 (104)	Essendon	11.5 (71)	Glenferrie Oval	14,181	19 June 1971
Footscray	8.15 (63)	Collingwood	6.10 (46)	Western Oval	21,188	19 June 1971
South Melbourne	2.6 (18)	Melbourne	6.13 (49)	VFL Park	12,528	19 June 1971

=== Round 13 ===
Home team	Home team score	Away team	Away team score	Venue	Crowd	Date
North Melbourne	6.16 (52)	St Kilda	16.15 (111)	Arden Street Oval	8,508	26 June 1971
Geelong	13.9 (87)	South Melbourne	9.12 (66)	Kardinia Park	11,222	26 June 1971
Collingwood	18.16 (124)	Richmond	12.12 (84)	Victoria Park	33,338	26 June 1971
Melbourne	11.13 (79)	Footscray	12.8 (80)	MCG	28,471	26 June 1971
Essendon	13.6 (84)	Carlton	14.14 (98)	Windy Hill	18,853	26 June 1971
Fitzroy	7.16 (58)	Hawthorn	14.9 (93)	VFL Park	18,369	26 June 1971

=== Round 14 ===
Home team	Home team score	Away team	Away team score	Venue	Crowd	Date
Geelong	13.6 (84)	Hawthorn	15.13 (103)	Kardinia Park	14,283	3 July 1971
Collingwood	30.20 (200)	Essendon	7.11 (53)	Victoria Park	26,831	3 July 1971
St Kilda	13.9 (87)	Richmond	13.12 (90)	Moorabbin Oval	28,825	3 July 1971
South Melbourne	18.15 (123)	Footscray	19.11 (125)	Lake Oval	13,360	3 July 1971
North Melbourne	13.11 (89)	Fitzroy	11.16 (82)	Arden Street Oval	8,777	3 July 1971
Carlton	12.16 (88)	Melbourne	11.6 (72)	VFL Park	27,511	3 July 1971

=== Round 15 ===
Home team	Home team score	Away team	Away team score	Venue	Crowd	Date
Richmond	12.18 (90)	South Melbourne	11.13 (79)	MCG	22,870	10 July 1971
Hawthorn	20.5 (125)	St Kilda	15.12 (102)	Glenferrie Oval	21,647	10 July 1971
Essendon	11.12 (78)	Melbourne	12.17 (89)	Windy Hill	14,093	10 July 1971
Carlton	21.15 (141)	Geelong	15.14 (104)	Princes Park	21,000	10 July 1971
Fitzroy	11.18 (84)	Collingwood	16.6 (102)	Junction Oval	24,926	10 July 1971
Footscray	22.31 (163)	North Melbourne	11.5 (71)	VFL Park	10,075	10 July 1971

=== Round 16 ===
Home team	Home team score	Away team	Away team score	Venue	Crowd	Date
Footscray	13.8 (86)	Richmond	6.15 (51)	Western Oval	17,826	17 July 1971
South Melbourne	3.15 (33)	Hawthorn	11.16 (82)	Lake Oval	10,519	17 July 1971
Melbourne	4.10 (34)	Fitzroy	7.7 (49)	MCG	20,013	17 July 1971
North Melbourne	6.9 (45)	Collingwood	8.12 (60)	Arden Street Oval	9,835	17 July 1971
St Kilda	13.19 (97)	Carlton	8.6 (54)	Moorabbin Oval	25,518	17 July 1971
Geelong	13.7 (85)	Essendon	16.18 (114)	VFL Park	9,012	17 July 1971

=== Round 17 ===
Home team	Home team score	Away team	Away team score	Venue	Crowd	Date
Fitzroy	20.19 (139)	Geelong	11.10 (76)	Junction Oval	8,889	24 July 1971
Essendon	7.8 (50)	St Kilda	14.15 (99)	Windy Hill	15,273	24 July 1971
Collingwood	12.12 (84)	Melbourne	11.12 (78)	Victoria Park	27,243	24 July 1971
Carlton	24.16 (160)	South Melbourne	11.7 (73)	Princes Park	16,500	24 July 1971
Hawthorn	23.16 (154)	Footscray	4.15 (39)	Glenferrie Oval	21,059	24 July 1971
Richmond	25.19 (169)	North Melbourne	12.7 (79)	VFL Park	11,416	24 July 1971

=== Round 18 ===
Home team	Home team score	Away team	Away team score	Venue	Crowd	Date
North Melbourne	8.14 (62)	Melbourne	9.8 (62)	Arden Street Oval	6,522	31 July 1971
Richmond	16.12 (108)	Hawthorn	11.10 (76)	MCG	47,951	31 July 1971
South Melbourne	13.8 (86)	Essendon	13.18 (96)	Lake Oval	7,895	31 July 1971
Geelong	21.11 (137)	Collingwood	19.14 (128)	Kardinia Park	22,000	31 July 1971
Footscray	11.10 (76)	Carlton	15.16 (106)	Western Oval	21,670	31 July 1971
St Kilda	13.5 (83)	Fitzroy	9.10 (64)	VFL Park	14,563	31 July 1971

=== Round 19 ===
Home team	Home team score	Away team	Away team score	Venue	Crowd	Date
Hawthorn	23.16 (154)	North Melbourne	9.8 (62)	Glenferrie Oval	9,112	7 August 1971
Fitzroy	11.17 (83)	South Melbourne	8.10 (58)	Junction Oval	8,253	7 August 1971
Essendon	7.23 (65)	Footscray	9.12 (66)	Windy Hill	13,815	7 August 1971
Carlton	8.10 (58)	Richmond	14.17 (101)	Princes Park	34,224	7 August 1971
Melbourne	18.17 (125)	Geelong	9.8 (62)	MCG	23,017	7 August 1971
Collingwood	8.10 (58)	St Kilda	12.7 (79)	VFL Park	46,362	7 August 1971

=== Round 20 ===
Home team	Home team score	Away team	Away team score	Venue	Crowd	Date
Geelong	24.7 (151)	North Melbourne	11.10 (76)	Kardinia Park	12,085	14 August 1971
St Kilda	14.11 (95)	Melbourne	9.10 (64)	Moorabbin Oval	25,081	14 August 1971
Footscray	11.9 (75)	Fitzroy	15.20 (110)	Western Oval	15,096	14 August 1971
Richmond	18.18 (126)	Essendon	10.12 (72)	MCG	28,388	14 August 1971
Hawthorn	11.15 (81)	Carlton	19.6 (120)	Glenferrie Oval	22,753	14 August 1971
South Melbourne	9.8 (62)	Collingwood	18.18 (126)	VFL Park	19,491	14 August 1971

=== Round 21 ===
Home team	Home team score	Away team	Away team score	Venue	Crowd	Date
St Kilda	18.14 (122)	South Melbourne	6.14 (50)	Moorabbin Oval	16,205	21 August 1971
Melbourne	15.12 (102)	Richmond	19.9 (123)	MCG	37,732	21 August 1971
Collingwood	15.15 (105)	Hawthorn	20.20 (140)	Victoria Park	41,312	21 August 1971
Geelong	18.18 (126)	Footscray	15.5 (95)	Kardinia Park	17,864	21 August 1971
North Melbourne	15.13 (103)	Essendon	10.12 (72)	Arden Street Oval	8,733	21 August 1971
Fitzroy	15.15 (105)	Carlton	11.16 (82)	Junction Oval	22,413	21 August 1971

=== Round 22 ===
Home team	Home team score	Away team	Away team score	Venue	Crowd	Date
Hawthorn	18.16 (124)	Melbourne	8.17 (65)	Glenferrie Oval	14,809	28 August 1971
Footscray	10.14 (74)	St Kilda	12.18 (90)	Western Oval	16,707	28 August 1971
Essendon	12.12 (84)	Fitzroy	13.17 (95)	Windy Hill	12,865	28 August 1971
Carlton	16.10 (106)	Collingwood	13.9 (87)	Princes Park	32,000	28 August 1971
South Melbourne	19.17 (131)	North Melbourne	8.11 (59)	Lake Oval	9,307	28 August 1971
Richmond	16.14 (110)	Geelong	14.18 (102)	MCG	36,423	28 August 1971

== Ladder ==
(P)	Premiers
	Qualified for finals

#	Team	P	W	L	D	PF	PA	%	Pts
1	Hawthorn (P)	22	19	3	0	2460	1601	153.7	76
2	St Kilda	22	16	6	0	2176	1554	140.0	64
3	Richmond	22	16	6	0	2318	1890	122.6	64
4	Collingwood	22	14	7	1	2331	1840	126.7	58
5	Carlton	22	14	8	0	2103	2014	104.4	56
6	Fitzroy	22	12	10	0	2047	1915	106.9	48
7	Melbourne	22	11	10	1	1962	1791	109.5	46
8	Footscray	22	11	11	0	1966	2217	88.7	44
9	North Melbourne	22	5	16	1	1705	2551	66.8	22
10	Geelong	22	5	17	0	2072	2523	82.1	20
11	Essendon	22	4	17	1	1705	2252	75.7	18
12	South Melbourne	22	3	19	0	1618	2315	69.9	12

Rules for classification: 1. premiership points; 2. percentage; 3. points for
Average score: 92.7
Source: AFL Tables

== Finals series ==
=== Semi-finals ===
Team	1 Qtr	2 Qtr	3 Qtr	Final
Richmond	4.4	8.8	11.10	18.13 (121)
Collingwood	4.1	5.5	11.8	11.11 (77)
Attendance: : 99,771

Team	1 Qtr	2 Qtr	3 Qtr	Final
Hawthorn	2.7	8.12	11.16	12.18 (90)
St Kilda	1.4	4.5	7.7	12.16 (88)
Attendance: 99,822

=== Preliminary final ===
Team	1 Qtr	2 Qtr	3 Qtr	Final
St Kilda	1.2	6.7	11.10	16.12 (108)
Richmond	3.2	7.2	9.4	12.6 (78)
Attendance: 102,494

=== Grand final ===
Team	1 Qtr	2 Qtr	3 Qtr	Final
Hawthorn	2.2	4.4	5.7	12.10 (82)
St Kilda	2.1	4.6	8.9	11.9 (75)
Attendance: 118,192

== Consolation Night Series Competition ==
The consolation night series were held under the floodlights at Lake Oval, South Melbourne, for the teams (5th to 12th on ladder) out of the finals at the end of the home and away rounds.

Final: Melbourne 12.7 (79) defeated Fitzroy 9.9 (63).

== Season notes ==
- Fitzroy winger Treva McGregor won the 1971, 130-yard Stawell Gift in 11.7 seconds, off a handicap of 7¼ yards.
- Bill Barrot of Richmond and Ian Stewart of St Kilda swap clubs before the start of the 1971 season. Stewart went on to win his third Brownlow Medal at Richmond, while Barrott was so dissatisfied at St Kilda's demands that he play in defence that he requested, and was given, a clearance to Carlton during the season.
- The VFL sold its Harrison House headquarters and moved to 84 Jolimont Street.
- The second half of the round 21 match between Fitzroy and Carlton at Junction Oval was played in an exceptionally thick fog which suddenly blew in from Port Phillip Bay. Visibility was so poor that players and umpires struggled to see more than a few yards in front of themselves. In one humorous moment in the Carlton backline, Carlton's Percy Jones instinctively shouted "there it is" upon seeing the ball come into his vision, alerting a nearby unsighted opponent who gathered the ball for an easy goal. Throughout the second half, the goal umpires could not see each other's flags, forcing the boundary umpires to convey messages between the goal umpires for scorekeeping purposes; and the timekeepers admitted that they were guessing how much time off to apply. The fog dissipated about five minutes after the game ended; and a new rule was introduced to allow the umpire and captains to agree to abandon play in bad visibility.
- In the grand final, Peter Hudson could have broken Bob Pratt's season record of 150 goals except for three incidents:
  - He kicked what would have otherwise been an easy goal into the man on the mark (Barry Lawrence).
  - He kicked a goal on the run that was disallowed because the end of the quarter siren had gone before the ball hit his boot.
  - He ran into an open goal and kicked the ball out of bounds.
- The Committees of the Carlton Football Club and Collingwood decide not to renew the contracts of their respective coaches, Ron Barassi and Bob Rose.

== Awards ==
=== Major awards ===
- The 1971 VFL Premiership team was Hawthorn.
- The VFL's leading goalkicker was Peter Hudson of Hawthorn who kicked 150 goals (including 10 goals in the finals).
- The winner of the 1971 Brownlow Medal was Ian Stewart of Richmond with 21 votes.
- South Melbourne took the "wooden spoon" in 1971.
- The reserves premiership was won by Richmond. Richmond 14.14 (98) defeated Essendon 8.18 (66) in the Grand Final, held as a curtain-raiser to the seniors Grand Final at the Melbourne Cricket Ground on 25 September.

=== Leading goalkickers ===
- Numbers highlighted in blue indicates the player led the goalkicking at the end of that round.
- DNP = did not play in that round.

	Player	1	2	3	4	5	6	7	8	9	10	11	12	13	14	15	16	17	18	19	20	21	22	SF	PF	GF	Total
1	Peter Hudson	5_{5}	4_{9}	1_{10}	7_{17}	5_{22}	3_{25}	10_{35}	7_{42}	5_{47}	5_{52}	5_{57}	6_{63}	9_{72}	7_{79}	12_{91}	6_{97}	9_{106}	6_{112}	6_{118}	3_{121}	9_{130}	10_{140}	7_{147}		3_{150}	150
2	Peter McKenna	4_{4}	9_{13}	3_{16}	10_{26}	4_{30}	10_{40}	6_{46}	7_{53}	6_{59}	5_{64}	8_{72}	1_{73}	10_{83}	12_{95}	6_{101}	DNP	2_{103}	8_{111}	1_{112}	8_{120}	6_{126}	4_{130}	4_{134}			134
3	Doug Wade	3_{3}	4_{7}	6_{13}	4_{17}	4_{21}	DNP	DNP	2_{23}	7_{30}	5_{35}	6_{41}	2_{43}	3_{46}	7_{53}	8_{61}	2_{63}	DNP	9_{72}	2_{74}	13_{87}	3_{90}	4_{94}				94
4	Alan Davis	1_{1}	DNP	0_{1}	1_{2}	4_{6}	3_{9}	4_{13}	10_{23}	5_{28}	5_{33}	3_{36}	5_{41}	2_{43}	3_{46}	4_{50}	3_{53}	2_{55}	2_{57}	DNP	4_{61}	2_{63}	0_{63}	DNP	6_{69}	1_{70}	70
5	Bill Ryan	3_{3}	4_{7}	4_{11}	0_{11}	2_{13}	2_{15}	4_{19}	3_{22}	7_{29}	3_{32}	0_{32}	0_{32}	3_{35}	3_{38}	0_{38}	DNP	3_{41}	6_{47}	3_{50}	7_{57}	8_{65}	2_{67}				67
6	Royce Hart	4_{4}	3_{7}	3_{10}	0_{10}	3_{13}	2_{15}	1_{16}	4_{20}	2_{22}	4_{26}	2_{28}	0_{28}	0_{28}	1_{29}	5_{34}	DNP	6_{40}	2_{42}	6_{48}	0_{48}	2_{50}	4_{54}	3_{57}	2_{59}		59
7	Alex Jesaulenko	3_{3}	DNP	6_{9}	3_{12}	2_{14}	5_{19}	DNP	DNP	1_{20}	4_{24}	1_{25}	DNP	2_{27}	DNP	5_{32}	2_{34}	7_{41}	3_{44}	3_{47}	7_{54}	1_{55}	1_{56}				56
8	Kevin Bartlett	6_{6}	1_{7}	2_{9}	4_{13}	1_{14}	3_{17}	1_{18}	4_{22}	3_{25}	3_{28}	5_{33}	2_{35}	1_{36}	1_{37}	1_{38}	1_{39}	1_{40}	1_{41}	0_{41}	4_{45}	2_{47}	2_{49}	3_{52}	1_{53}		53
9	Barry Breen	1_{1}	3_{4}	0_{4}	2_{6}	3_{9}	2_{11}	2_{13}	4_{17}	0_{17}	2_{19}	1_{20}	0_{20}	4_{24}	1_{25}	2_{27}	0_{27}	1_{28}	3_{31}	2_{33}	3_{36}	3_{39}	4_{43}	4_{47}	3_{50}	3_{53}	53
10	Barry Richardson	0_{0}	0_{0}	0_{0}	0_{0}	0_{0}	0_{0}	2_{2}	0_{2}	0_{2}	0_{2}	0_{2}	DNP	6_{8}	5_{13}	3_{16}	0_{16}	5_{21}	4_{25}	5_{30}	7_{37}	6_{43}	2_{45}	0_{45}	5_{50}		50

== Sources ==
- 1971 VFL season at AFL Tables
- 1971 VFL season at Australian Football
