= Talia Martin =

Australian sprinter (born 2000)

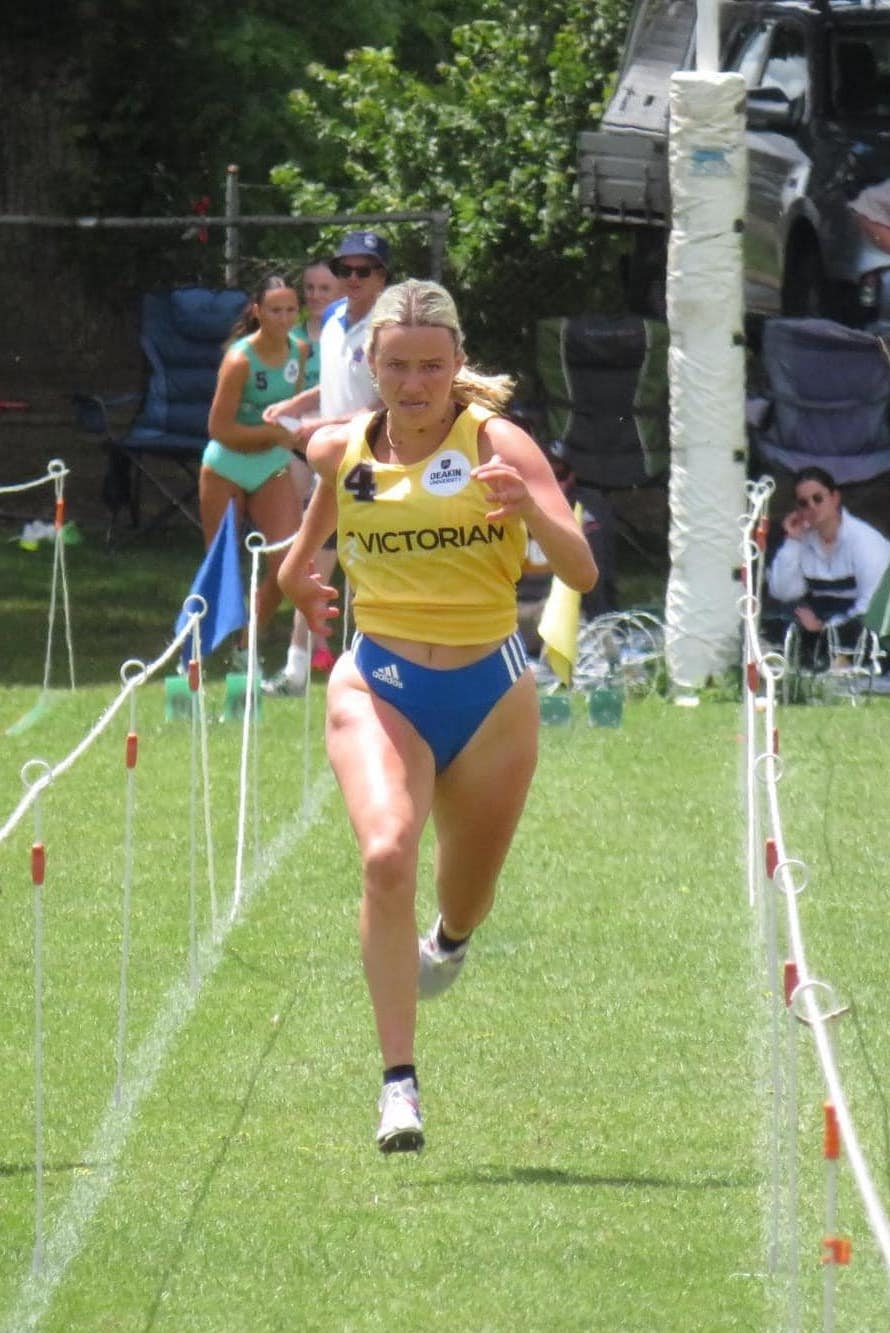
- Talia Martin racing at the Terang Gift 2023

Personal information
- Nationality: Australian
- Born: 4 December 2000 (age 25) Ballarat, Australia

Sport
- Country: Australia
- Sport: Sprint (handicapped)
- Event: 120 metres
- Club: POD Squad
- Coached by: Anthony Martin Daniel Martin Peter O'Dwyer

Talia Martin (born 4 December 2000) is an Australian athlete, known best as a sprinter. She won the 2016 Stawell Gift becoming the youngest ever female to do so at the age of 15.

== Athletics ==
In 2016, Talia Martin made history by winning the Australia Post 120 m (390 ft) Stawell Women's Gift at just 15 years old, becoming the youngest female ever to win the prestigious race. She took home the impressive prize of $40,000 AUD after triumphing in a thrilling race from a 13 m (43 ft) handicap, crossing the finish line in 13.69 seconds to secure a narrow victory over Tierra Exum, the sister of NBA star Dante Exum.

In 2017, Martin also won the Women's 300 m (980 ft) race at the Geelong Gift off a 16 m (52 ft) handicap.

Throughout 2018 to 2020, Martin remained committed to sprinting, although she struggled to advance to finals during this period. At the conclusion of the 2019/2020 Victorian Athletic League season, Martin decided to step away from the sport.

Martin never lost her passion for the sport. In the 2023/2024 Victorian Athletic League season, she made a notable return to competitive racing. Throughout the season, Martin demonstrated her determination and skill by qualifying for an impressive five finals including a second-place finish in the Women's 400 m (1310 ft) 2023 Mortlake Gift.

=== Controversy ===
After Martin's 2016 Stawell Gift win, she was fined $2000 AUD for inconsistent running. Stewards issued the penalty due to her improvement of 7 m (23 ft) from a race held in the Victorian town of Ararat just twelve days prior.

Talia Martin's 2016 Race Times
Race	Month	Distance	Handicap (metres)	Adjusted time (seconds)
Maryborough	January	120m	11.50	14.666
Ballarat	February	120m	11.50	14.280
Ararat	March	120m (under 20s)	22	13.412
Stawell	March	120m	13	13.696

Martin's Coach, Peter O'Dwyer explained that Martin's underperformance in Ararat was a result of a family bereavement. "She showed improvement from Ararat, but there were various challenges leading up to the race," he stated. "Her aunt, who was like a grandmother to her, had passed away that week, and she had just attended the funeral, understandably feeling very upset." He refuted any claims that Martin had been involved in a scheme to intentionally lose a race in order to avoid a more significant handicap.
