= Bobby Kinnear =

Australian sprinter

Bobby Kinnear (c. 1851–1935) was born near Stawell. He was an Aboriginal Australian sprinter from the Ebenezer Mission Station, at Antwerp, Victoria, who was discovered by former champion runner, Sam Hughes.

Kinnear won the Stawell Gift in 1883.

Kinnear died in January 1935. He was from the Avoca tribe, Yairy-Yairy.

== Links ==
- Bobby Kinnear profile via Indigenous Australia Biography
- Bobby Kinnear profile via Aboriginal Monument Australia
- Bobby Kinnear headstone photo via Find a grave
- 1929 - photo of Bobby Kinnear
