= Ray Yeoman (Australian footballer) =

Australian rules footballer

Personal information
- Full name: Ray Nicholas Yeoman
- Born: 8 October 1934
- Died: 4 April 2004 (aged 69)
- Original team: Mansfield
- Height: 174 cm (5 ft 9 in)
- Weight: 70 kg (154 lb)
- Position: Wing

Playing career^{1}
Years	Club	Games (Goals)
1955–60	Hawthorn	74 (47)
- ^{1} Playing statistics correct to the end of 1960.

Ray Nicholas Yeoman (8 October 1934 – 4 April 2004) was an Australian rules footballer who played with Hawthorn in the Victorian Football League (VFL).

Yeoman was originally from Mansfield in the Waranga North East Football Association.

Yeoman won the 1960 Bendigo 1000 Gift.
