= Alf Tredinnick =

Australian rules footballer (1873–1910)

Personal information
- Full name: Alfred Ernest Tredinnick
- Born: 16 June 1873; Campbells Creek, Victoria
- Died: 19 May 1910 (aged 36); East Melbourne, Victoria
- Original team: Goldfields League
- Height: 174 cm (5 ft 9 in)
- Position: Defender

Playing career^{1}
| Years | Club | Games (Goals) |
| 1901 | Melbourne | 7 (1) |
- ^{1} Playing statistics correct to the end of 1901.

Alfred Ernest Tredinnick (16 June 1873 – 19 May 1910) was an Australian rules footballer who played for the Melbourne Football Club in the Victorian Football League (VFL).

Tredinnick played football for Rovers Football Club in the Western Australian Football Association in 1898 before moving to the Goldfields Football Association and playing for Kalgoorlie from 1899 to 1900, where he was an all-round sportsman who also played cricket and ran competitively as a sprinter. He was an employee of the Western Australian Bank while living in Kalgoorlie, which meant he had to run under the assumed name "Alf Hall".

He returned to Victoria in 1901 and played seven games for Melbourne in the Victorian Football League during that season. In 1902, he won the Stawell Gift, Australia's most prestigious running race. Tredinnick died after a short illness in 1910; his obituary remembered him as "one of the best footballers and athletes in the Castlemaine district".
