= Stuart Uhlmann =

Australian sprinter

Stuart Uhlmann (born 20 December 1971) is an Australian former sprinter who won the 2002 Stawell Gift.

He was trained by Bob Cook on the Gold Coast.

Starting from a handicap of 6.75m, Uhlmann won the 2002 Stawell Gift race in a time of 11.98 seconds to beat Greg Saddler and Idika Uduma. He previously won the Jupiters gift in 1993 and multiple gifts around the country.

He is now retired from competing, but he is currently training Jarrod Whittaker who competed at Stawell for the first time in 2015.
