= Ernie George (Australian footballer) =

Australian rules footballer

Personal information
- Full name: Ernest Arthur George
- Born: 17 October 1887; Mount Egerton, Victoria
- Died: 5 February 1971 (aged 83); Armadale, Victoria

Playing career^{1}
Years	Club	Games (Goals)
1911	South Melbourne	1 (0)
- ^{1} Playing statistics correct to the end of 1911.

Ernest Arthur George (17 October 1887 – 5 February 1971) was an Australian rules footballer who played with South Melbourne in the Victorian Football League (VFL).

He later played for Brunswick in the VFA.

George is best known for winning the 1913 Stawell Gift off 12½ yards in 12.2secs.
