= Treva McGregor =

Australian rules footballer

Personal information
- Full name: Treva McGregor
- Born: 1 June 1947 (age 79)
- Original team: Sandhurst
- Height: 185 cm (6 ft 1 in)
- Weight: 83 kg (183 lb)
- Position: Wing

Playing career^{1}
Years	Club	Games (Goals)
1966–71	Fitzroy	47 (19)
1977	Warburton-Millgrove	
- ^{1} Playing statistics correct to the end of 1971.

Treva McGregor (born 1 June 1947) is a former Australian rules footballer who played with Fitzroy in the Victorian Football League (VFL).

McGregor is the last VFL (now AFL) footballer to win the Stawell Gift. He ran 2nd in 1970 before returning in 1971 to win. He was trained by Jim Spain who had been coaching for 34 years before guiding McGregor to win the Stawell Gift.

McGregor retired from football and became a 'world' professional sprint champion in 1973 after winning all four races over 60, 100, 120, and 200 meters. In 1974 he relinquished the world professional sprint championship to George McNeill. An interesting detail is that his twin brother, Murray McGregor, finished third in the 1975 final behind Jean-Louis Ravelomanantsoa's historic win from scratch. Suffering from Achilles tendon problems, McGregor retired from athletics after his third place in a 1976 Stawell Gift semi-final.

McGregor worked as a Catholic school teacher. He was a high school principal for many years before retiring in 2002.
