= Dave Strickland =

Australian rules footballer (1877–1963)

Personal information
- Full name: David McKenzie Strickland
- Born: 4 December 1877; Melbourne, Victoria
- Died: 31 December 1963 (aged 86); Perth, Western Australia
- Original team: Menzies

Playing career^{1}
Years	Club	Games (Goals)
1900	St Kilda	1 (0)
- ^{1} Playing statistics correct to the end of 1900.

David McKenzie Strickland (4 December 1877 – 31 December 1963) was an Australian rules footballer who played with St Kilda in the Victorian Football League (VFL). and was also a Stawell Gift winner in 1900.

While working at Menzies in the goldfields of Western Australia, Strickland met Michael Herley, who was also an outstanding athlete, holding Victorian, National and Australasian high jump titles from 1887 through to 1890 with a record jump in 1890 of 6 ft ½ Inch. They both participated in athletics in Kalgoorlie in the late 1800s, as at that time The Kalgoorlie Athletics Club was very strong with many top athletes participating. Herley trained Strickland in sprinting techniques introducing him to starting blocks and to studded running shoes. This produced such good results that Strickland became unbeatable in Kalgoorlie.

In 1900 they both boarded a ship in Esperance and sailed to South Australia to compete in the Stawell Gift held during the Easter break in western Victoria. After surviving a protest, Strickland won this famous foot race when he ran the 130 yards (120-m), winning in 12 seconds off a handicap of 10 yards. While he performed at this level he would have been eligible to compete in the 1900 Summer Olympics in Paris, however he was unable to attend as he lacked the finance for a trip to France.

His daughter, Shirley Strickland, represented Australia at three Olympic Games, winning seven medals, including three gold.

References

- Hughes, Dave; Signy, Helen (21 February 2004). "A champion of mind and body". Sydney Morning Herald. Retrieved 9 February 2009.
- The Pilbarra Goldfield News (Marble Bar, WA : 1897 - 1923) https://trove.nla.gov.au/newspaper/article/146087636
