= Ernest Carter (footballer) =

Australian rules footballer

Personal information
- Full name: Ernest Carter
- Born: 24 February 1889; Richmond, Victoria
- Died: 25 April 1955 (aged 66); Concord Repatriation General Hospital
- Original team: Balmain (VMFL)
- Height: 188 cm (6 ft 2 in)
- Weight: 82 kg (181 lb)
- Position: Utility

Playing career^{1}
Years	Club	Games (Goals)
1910	Richmond	1 (0)
1916–17, 1920	Carlton	20 (4)
Total		21 (4)
- ^{1} Playing statistics correct to the end of 1920.

Ernest Carter (24 February 1889 – 25 April 1955) was an Australian rules footballer who played with Richmond and Carlton in the Victorian Football League (VFL).

Carter was also a leading sprinter, winning the 1912 Stawell Gift.

== Sources ==
- Cullen, B. (2015) Harder than Football, Slattery Media Group: Melbourne. ISBN 9780992379148.
- Ernest Carter's playing statistics from AFL Tables
- Ernest Carter's profile at Blueseum
