= Leslie Watt (footballer) =

Australian rules footballer, born 1912

Les Watt
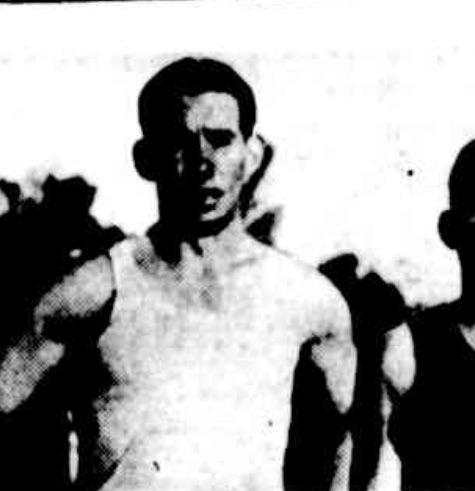
- Watt at the Eltham Gift in 1936

Personal information
- Full name: Leslie Alfred Watt
- Born: 9 December 1912; Rochester, Victoria
- Died: 20 January 1949 (aged 36); Echuca, Victoria
- Original team: Rochester
- Height: 180 cm (5 ft 11 in)
- Weight: 84 kg (185 lb)

Playing career^{1}
Years	Club	Games (Goals)
1932	Collingwood	2 (0)
1933–37	Fitzroy	35 (19)
Total		37 (19)
- ^{1} Playing statistics correct to the end of 1937.

Leslie Alfred Watt (9 December 1912 – 20 January 1949) was an Australian rules footballer who played with Collingwood and Fitzroy in the Victorian Football League (VFL).

A talented sprinter, he came fourth in the 1936 Stawell Gift, after being named as one of the favourites in the lead up to the race, winning the Eltham Gift the previous week.
