= Ron McCann =

Australian rules footballer (1913–1996)

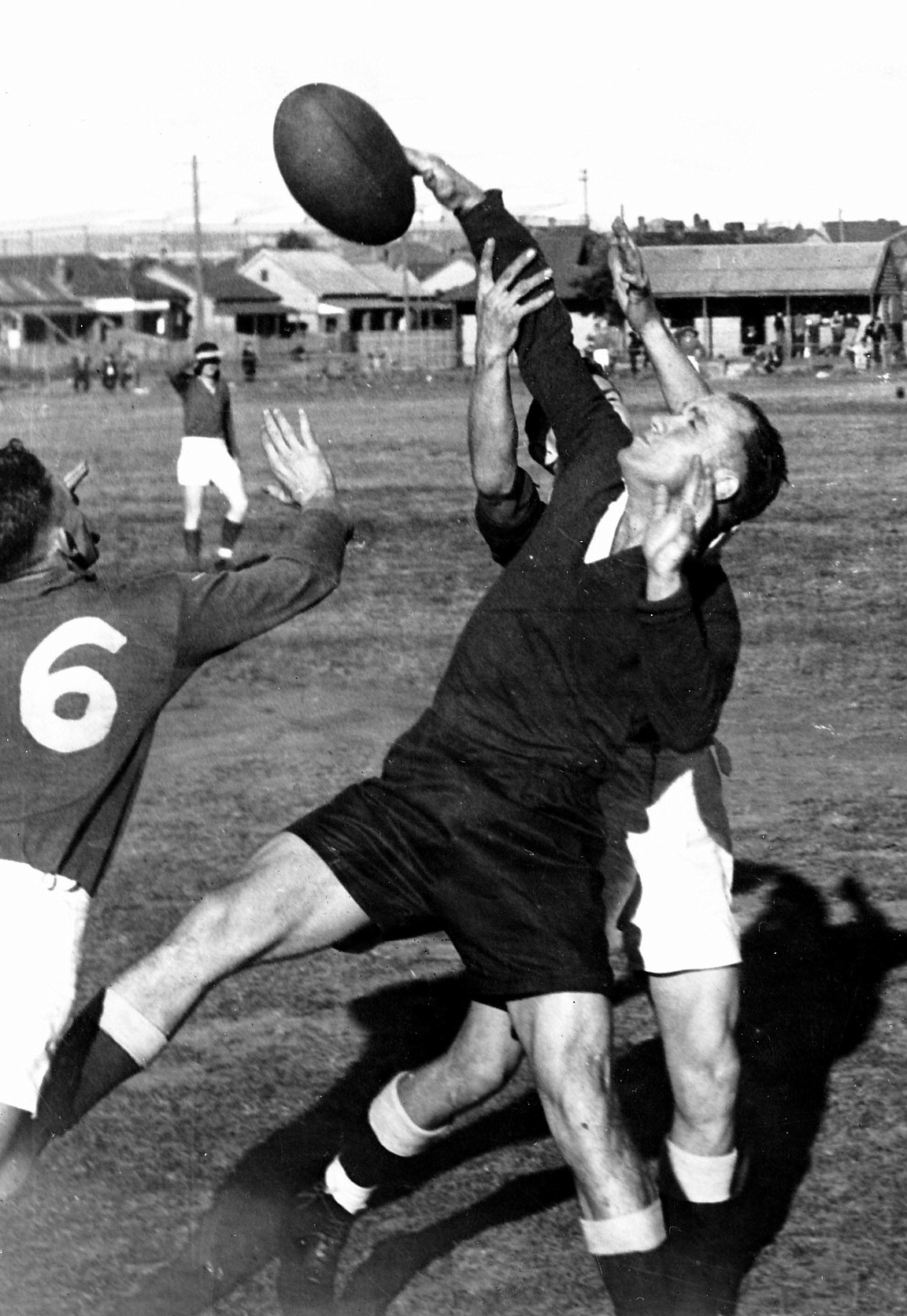
- McCann in 1947

Personal information
- Full name: Ronald Charles George McCann
- Born: 25 June 1913; Thornbury, Victoria
- Died: 15 February 1996 (aged 82); Queensland
- Original team: Castlemaine
- Height: 175 cm (5 ft 9 in)
- Weight: 72 kg (159 lb)

Playing career^{1}
Years	Club	Games (Goals)
1936	Collingwood	1 (0)
- ^{1} Playing statistics correct to the end of 1936.

Ronald Charles George McCann (25 June 1913 – 15 February 1996) was an Australian rules footballer who played with Collingwood in the Victorian Football League (VFL).

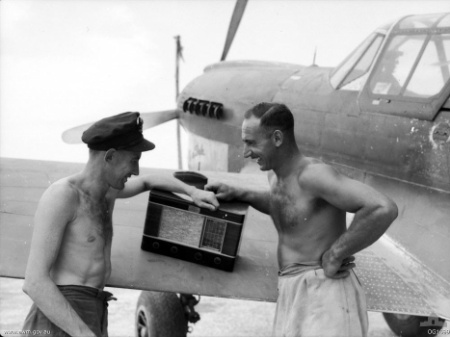
Ron McCann (left) and Frank Curcio (former Fitzroy player) listening to a radio broadcast of the VFL Grand Final on an airfield at Noemfoor Island, Dutch New Guinea, September, 1944.

== Family ==
The son of Charles Edward Wilson McCann (1880–1948), and Alice Eva McCann (1881–1955), née West, Ronald Charles George McCann was born on 25 June 1913.

He married Joy Randall (1914–2009) in 1937; they had two children, Roberta, and Diane.

== Professional athlete ==
He was a professional athlete.

=== Australasian Professional Championship (600 yards) ===
In March 1935, he won the 1935 Australasian Professional 600 Yards Championship by 5 yards; his time, 1min 13 3/16secs, was only 1 3/16seconds outside the world record set by the champion quarter- and half-miler, John Denham "Jack" Fitt (1900-1985).

=== Stawell Gift ===
McCann won the Castlemaine Gift in March 1936 prior to having beaten the South Melbourne footballer and champion sprinter Austin Robertson in the 1936 Stawell Gift heats, and running off a handicap of 6 1/2 yards, McCann won the 1936 Stawell Gift, "in the last stride", in 12 4/16 seconds, beating the schoolteacher and Glenelg wingman, Jack McCarthy (10 1/4 yards, second), the Footscray centreman, Bob Spargo Sr. (9 3/4 yards, third), and the Fitzroy half-back, Leslie Watt (10 1/2 yards, fourth).

== Football ==
=== Castlemaine Football Club (BFL) ===
Promoted from the club's Seconds, he played for the Castlemaine Football Club's First XVIII in 1934 and 1935.

=== Collingwood (VFL) ===
Having signed a Form Four in early 1936, R.C.G. McCann was granted a clearance from Castlemaine to Collingwood on Wednesday, 28 May 1936.

Having played in the Seconds, he played in his only senior match for Collingwood, against Footscray, at the Western Oval on 20 June 1936, when he replaced the indisposed Leo Morgan, and played on the wing.

=== Prahran (VFA) ===
On 14 April 1937, McCann was cleared from Collingwood to Prahran. He played the entire season with the Seconds and did not play a Senior game.

== Military service ==
He served with the RAAF in Dutch New Guinea during World War II.
