= Tom Miles (athlete) =

Australian sprinter

Thomas John Lesley Miles (17 November 1905 – 9 October 1961) was an Australian professional athlete/sprinter, whose running career really took off in the mid to late 1920's.

== Athletics ==
Miles, the "Bundeburg Flyer" won the 1927 Victorian Stawell Gift sprint race and the 1928 World Champion by defeating then reigning champion, Tim Banner.

== Early life ==
Miles was born in Bundaberg, the son of James Miles (1878-1940) and Grace Merrifield Nicholson (1885-1943). He attended Bundaberg South State School from 1911.

== Later life ==
Miles died after being struck by a car in Brisbane in 1961.
