= Lance Mann =

Australian rules footballer (1930–2015)

Personal information
- Full name: Lance Gibson Mann
- Born: 12 July 1930; Walwa, Victoria
- Died: 13 March 2015 (aged 84); Albury, New South Wales
- Original teams: Walwa, Albury
- Debut: 2 June 1951, Essendon vs. Fitzroy, at Brunswick Street Oval
- Height: 175 cm (5 ft 9 in)
- Weight: 73 kg (161 lb)
- Position: wing / small forward

Playing career^{1}
Years	Club	Games (Goals)
1946–1948	Walwa	? (?)
1949–1950	Albury	
1951–1954	Essendon	55 (21)
1955–1957	Albury	? (44)
1958–1959	Essendon	25 (1)
- ^{1} Playing statistics correct to the end of 1959.

Lance Gibson Mann (12 July 1930 – 13 March 2015) was a professional footrunner and a former Australian rules footballer in the Victorian Football League (VFL).

== Footballer ==
A talented wingman, "Gibbie" Mann started his football career in Walwa, where he played in Walwa's losing 1947 grand final side, won the club's 1947 best and fairest award and came 4th in the Upper Murray FA best and fairest award, before training with Melbourne in 1948. Mann returned to Walwa to play in Walwa's 1948 Upper Murray Football League's premiership. Mann then played with Albury Football Club in the Ovens & Murray Football League in 1949 and 1950.

Mann was granted a permit from Albury and played his first senior match for the Essendon Football Club against Fitzroy at the Brunswick Street Oval on 2 June 1951 (round 6). He played in every match for the rest of the season. He played in Essendon's Grand Final 10.10 (70) loss to Geelong 11.15 (81), and was one of Essendon's best players.

Lance returned to play with Albury from 1955 to 1957 and won the Ovens and Murray Football League Best and Fairest award, the Morris Medal in 1956 and was a member of Albury's 1956 premiership team.

He was the coach of the Essendon Reserve Grade team in 1960 and 1961.

== Sprinter ==
=== 1952 ===
Trained by Pat Kennedy, aged 21, Mann won the Wangaratta Gift on Monday 28 January 1952, running off 8½ yards 8 1/2 yards (7.8 m) in 12.1 seconds. He started the final as 5-to-4-on favourite, having been a 20/1 outsider before the first heat.

On Monday, 14 April 1952, he won the 75th [130-yard (120 m)] Stawell Gift in 11 14/16 seconds, running off a handicap of 7 1/4 yards (6.6 m).

On Wednesday, 16 April 1952, he also won the Bendigo Easter Gift by 2 yards (1.8 m) in 11.8 seconds, running off a handicap of 7 1/4 yards (6.6 m).

Mann was the first athlete to win the Wangaratta Gift, the Stawell Gift, and the Bendigo Gift treble in the same year. It is also significant that his Essendon team-mate, Norm McDonald, running off 5 yards (4.6 m), ran second to Mann in the finals of both the Stawell Gift and the Bendigo Gift.

=== 1958 ===
On Monday, 10 March 1958, and running off 4½ yards, he ran second in the Bendigo Thousand (130 yds); the feat was all the more remarkable as Mann had broken down during his heat the year before (1957) with a thigh injury so severe that he had to be stretchered from the ground.
