= Vin Sabbatucci =

Australian rules footballer

Personal information
- Full name: Vincent Ijino Sabbatucci
- Born: 12 January 1935
- Died: 23 August 2007 (aged 72)
- Original team: Clifton Hill / Xavier College
- Height: 166 cm (5 ft 5 in)
- Weight: 75 kg (165 lb)

Playing career^{1}
Years	Club	Games (Goals)
1954–1955	St Kilda	6 (9)
- ^{1} Playing statistics correct to the end of 1955.

Vincent Ijino Sabbatucci (12 January 1935 – 23 August 2007) was an Australian rules football player notable for playing for St Kilda in the Victorian Football League. Sabbatucci's mother was a first cousin of Fitzroy player Frank Curcio.

== Playing career ==
After a year with Fitzroy in reserve grade Sabbatucci moved to St Kilda for the 1954 VFL season, playing five matches in his first season.

His first VFL game was against Melbourne and he kicked 3 goals. Vin won the Best & Fairest for St Kilda Reserves in 1954. ‘The Argus’ newspaper described Vin as a ‘nuggety rover’ and in another match report referred to his ‘hard work’ around the packs. Vin played a total of 6 VFL matches and kicked 9 goals. Returning for the 1955 VFL season he played only one match, ending his VFL career at the age of 20. His last match for St Kilda was against South Melbourne in 1955 In June 1955 Vin crossed to Camberwell Football Club in the Victorian Football Association (VFA) where he would play 23 senior games between 1955 and 1958.

== Professional Running Career ==
While Vin made his mark in VFL and VFA football, he was also regarded as an outstanding professional runner and, in later years, a running coach. Sabbatucci took to professional running in 1950's in an effort to increase his speed for football.

Sabbatucci first ‘made the news’ in pro-running in December 1956 when he won the Talbot Gift (off 8 yards) in 12.3 seconds. He also won the Talbot Sprint (75 yards) on that day. Further to this Sabbatucci won the Northcote gift in 1962 in a time of 12.3 seconds. Over the next twenty years, Vin became a celebrity in the sport of professional foot racing, training and running himself, claiming race victories and running in multiple finals, most notable being a finalist in the Bendigo gift 4 times, but unfortunately not claiming a win in any of the 4 final appearances.

Vin was recognised as a leading coach and trained many of Melbourne’s best professional runners including Evan Armstrong, who won the Bendigo Gift (1977) and Brian Parker, who won that event in 1971. Vin also trained Prahran Gift winners Rod Butters (1982) and Bill Liston (1984). In 1977-78, Vin won the Australian Professional Runners and Trainers Association most celebrated award of the ‘Trainer of the Year’. Vin competed throughout Victoria and interstate, claiming more race victories.
