= Stawell Gift =

Annual Australian handicap running race

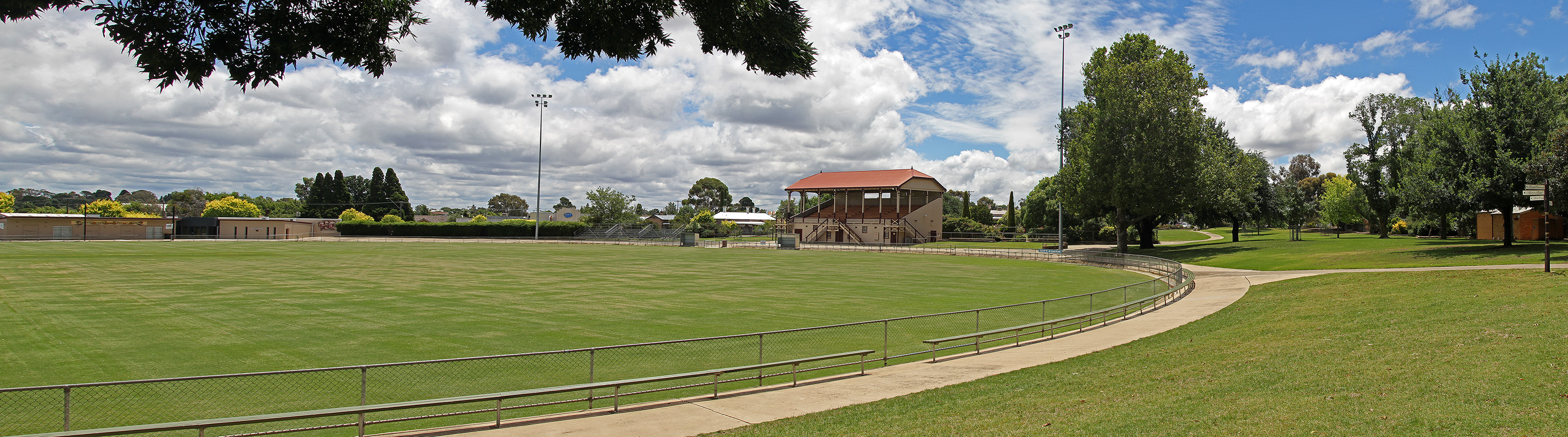
- Central Park, Stawell, site of the Stawell Gift, with the historic grandstand in centre frame; the Gift is run diagonally across the oval, finishing to the right of the grandstand near the large tree
- Date: Easter weekend
- Location: Stawell, Victoria, Australia
- Event type: Sprint (handicapped)
- Distance: 120 metres
- Primary sponsor: Powercor Australia (since 2021)
- Established: 1878, 148 years ago
- Website: www.stawellgift.com

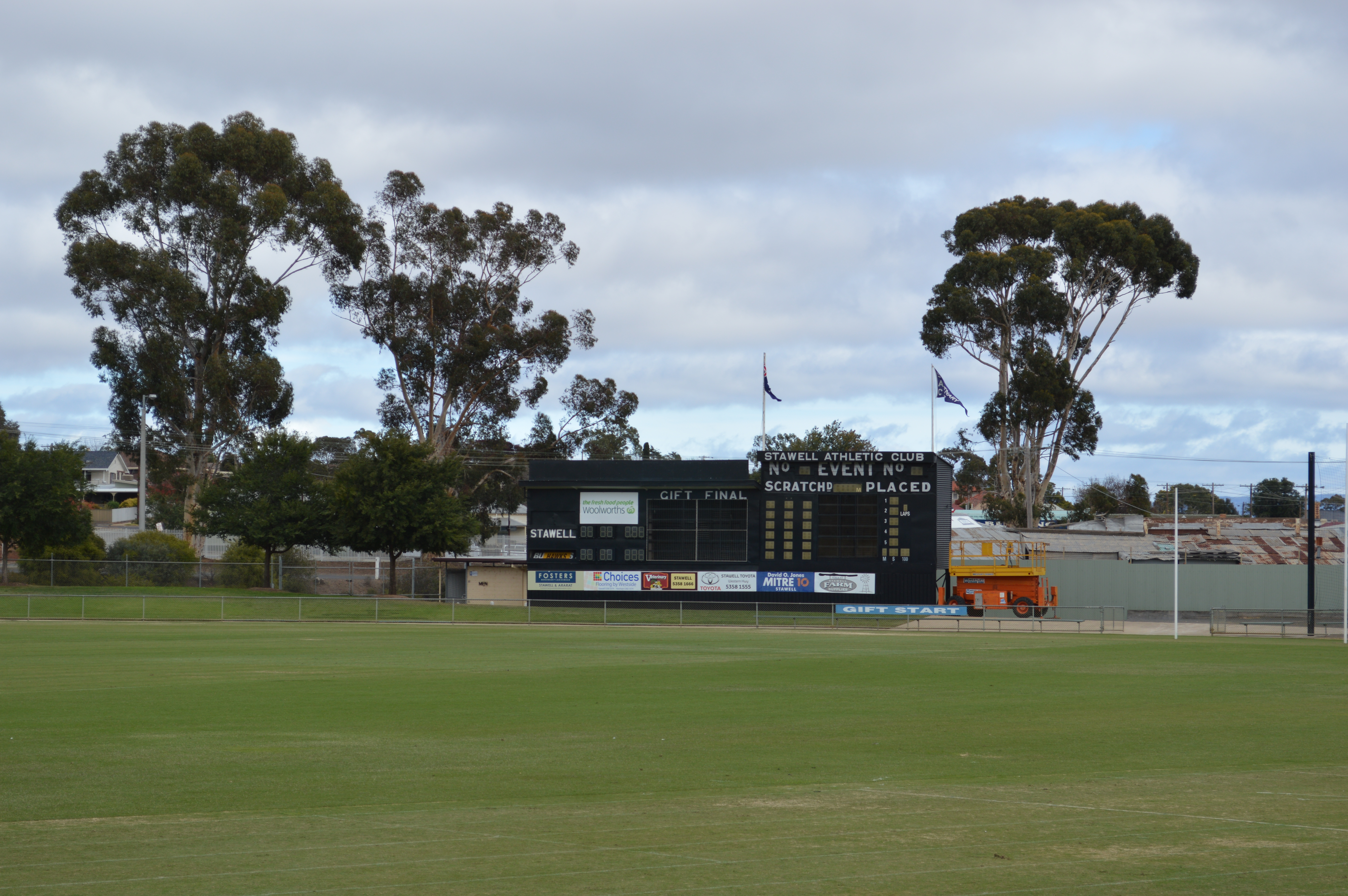
Stawell Central Park Scoreboard

The Stawell Gift is Australia's oldest and richest short-distance running race in Stawell, Victoria, Australia. It is the main event in an annual carnival held on Easter weekend by the Stawell Athletic Club, with the main race finals on the holiday Monday, at Central Park, Stawell in the Grampian Mountains district of western Victoria. As of 2016 the carnival encompasses events for both men and women of all ages and abilities, across distances from 70 to 3,200 metres.

The final of the iconic main race is run on grass over 120 metres up a slight gradient. Competitors are handicapped according to their form, with each competitor "marked" by between 0 and 10 metres or more to theoretically reach the finish line at the same time. This process is administered by the Victorian Athletic League (VAL). Due to the relatively short handicap limit, the class of runners that can potentially win the event is limited compared to other Gifts in Australia.

The winner is, hypothetically, the runner who can best "rise to the occasion" and perform better than their previous form, although the key can often be to perform slightly below their best in lead-up events and thus receive a favourable handicap. In 2020, the race was cancelled due to the COVID-19 pandemic in Australia, the first time since World War 2. In 2021, branded as the "Powercor Stawell Gift", the race was run at its usual Easter long weekend dates on 3–5 April.

== History ==
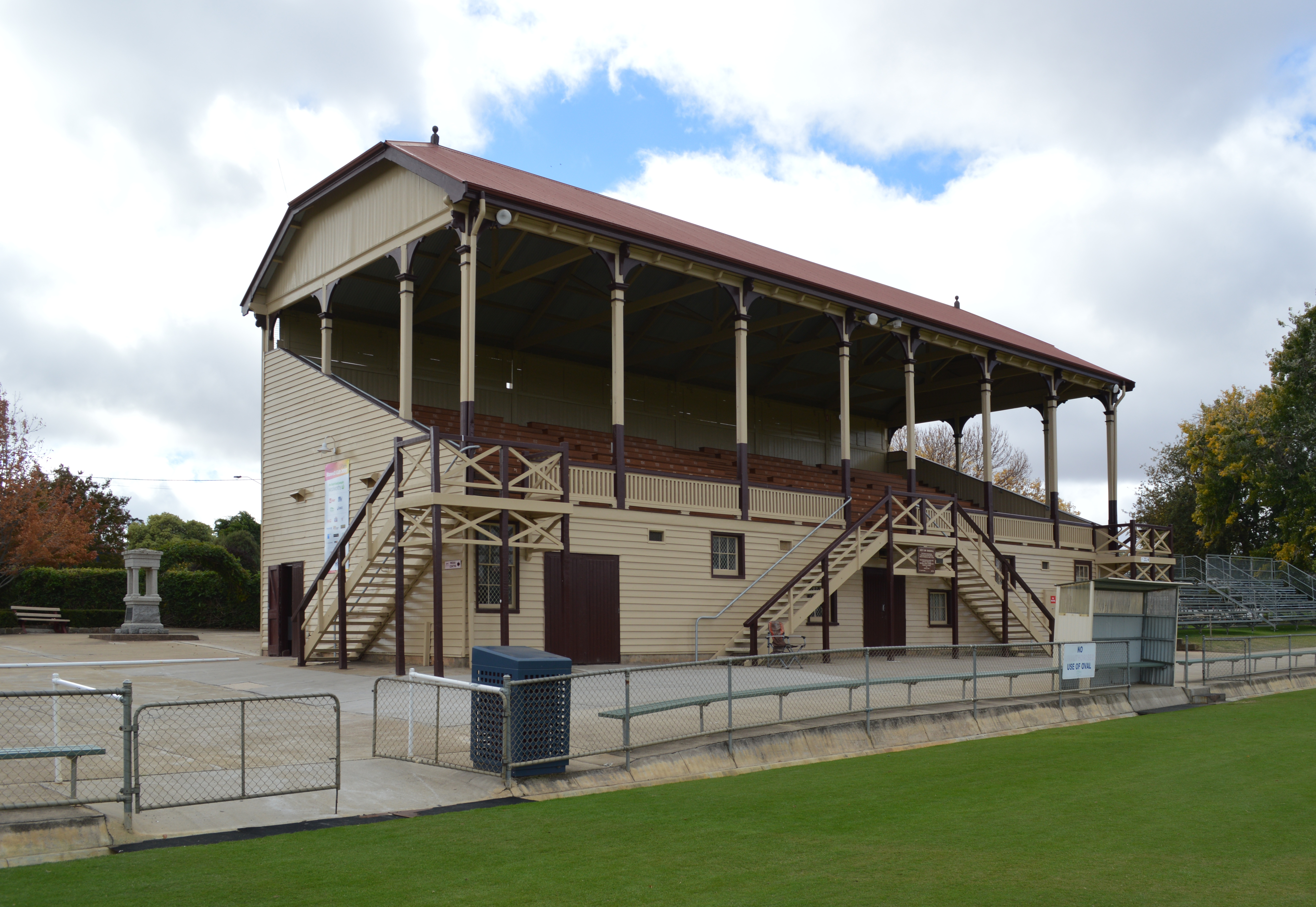
Stawell Central Park Grandstand, 2015

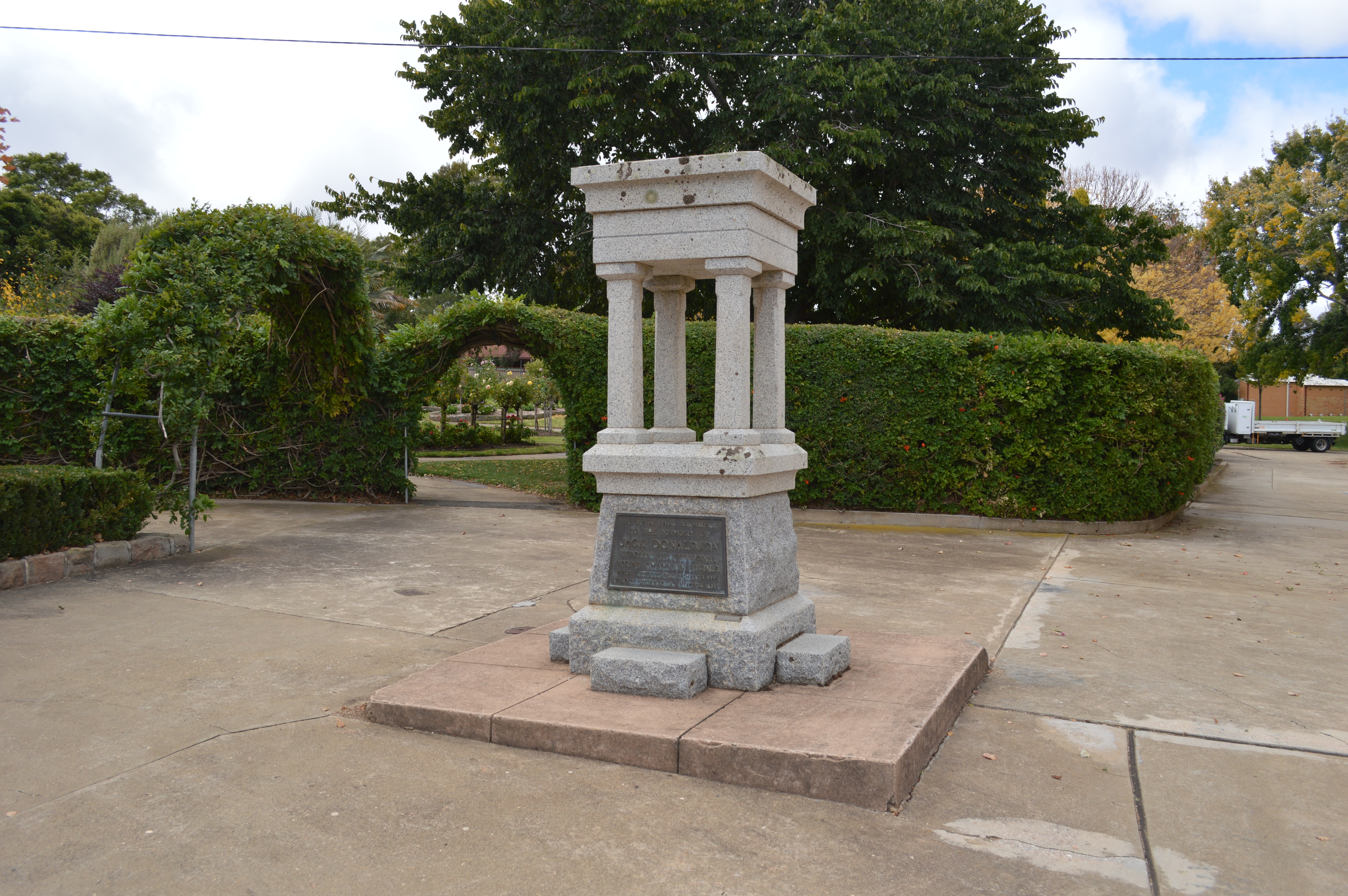
A drinking fountain dedicated to former Australian World Professional Sprint Champion & world record holder, Jack Donaldson at Central Park, the home of the Stawell Gift.

The Stawell Gift began in 1878, at the end of the Victorian gold rush, as the "Easter Gift", with prize money of £24 (equivalent to A$4,000 in 2022), conducted by the Stawell Athletic Club in a program of seven races, most run in multiple heats. It has been raced every year since, except for four years during the Second World War, and in 2020 due to the world-wide COVID-19 pandemic.

1920 winner, Archibald Gordon Cashmore was born in Stawell, thus becoming the first local to win this prestigious event. Cashmore was also a soldier in World War One.

In 1937, the event celebrated its diamond jubilee with £1,500 in prize money, making it the richest footrace in the world.

Originally it was part of a number of entertainments put on by the townspeople over Easter, complete with special trains to the event. Today, it is the most prestigious footrace in Australia, with a A$40,000 first prize. The finals are televised live around Australia, and internationally.

The event was historically run over 130 yards (118.9 m). In 1973, the race converted to the metric system, and the length of the track was altered to 120 metres (131.2 yd), essentially an identical distance. Electronic timing was introduced in 1982, thus allowing greater precision in determining race results.

In recognition of the late Eric Cumming's contribution to professional running, (Australia's only Powderhall Gift winner) the Stawell Athletic Club awards the most successful sprinter over 70 m, 120 m, and 200 m, at its annual Stawell Gift carnival, the Eric Cumming Memorial trophy.

In July 2009, the city of Ballarat made a bid to poach the Gift. It offered the Stawell Athletic Club A$1.25 million to host the race for five years from 2010. At the time, the Gift was experiencing financial difficulties. The offer was withdrawn later in July. The Victorian state government ruled out providing monetary assistance.

In 2010, the Gift track was found to be around three metres too long, with times much slower than expected during the heats.

In 2019, the Gift was having trouble attracting sponsors, which resulted in a reduction in prize money. In 2018, the prize pool for the men's and women's Gift had been A$40,000 each race, but that was reduced by A$15,000 in 2019. The Northern Grampians Shire Council offered assistance. It has been estimated that the Gift contributes A$5 million to the local economy.

In 2020, due to the COVID-19 pandemic, the race was initially postponed, and the Stawell Athletic Club considered options to run the event later in the year. In May the 2020 race was cancelled, for the first time since World War II.

Powercor Australia became the naming rights sponsor for five years, starting in 2021.

The 2021 Gift, branded as the "Powercor Stawell Gift", and the 139th running of the event, was held as usual during the Easter long weekend. It was won by Edward Ware of Victoria, and the women's event was won by Hayley Orman from South Australia.

== Format ==
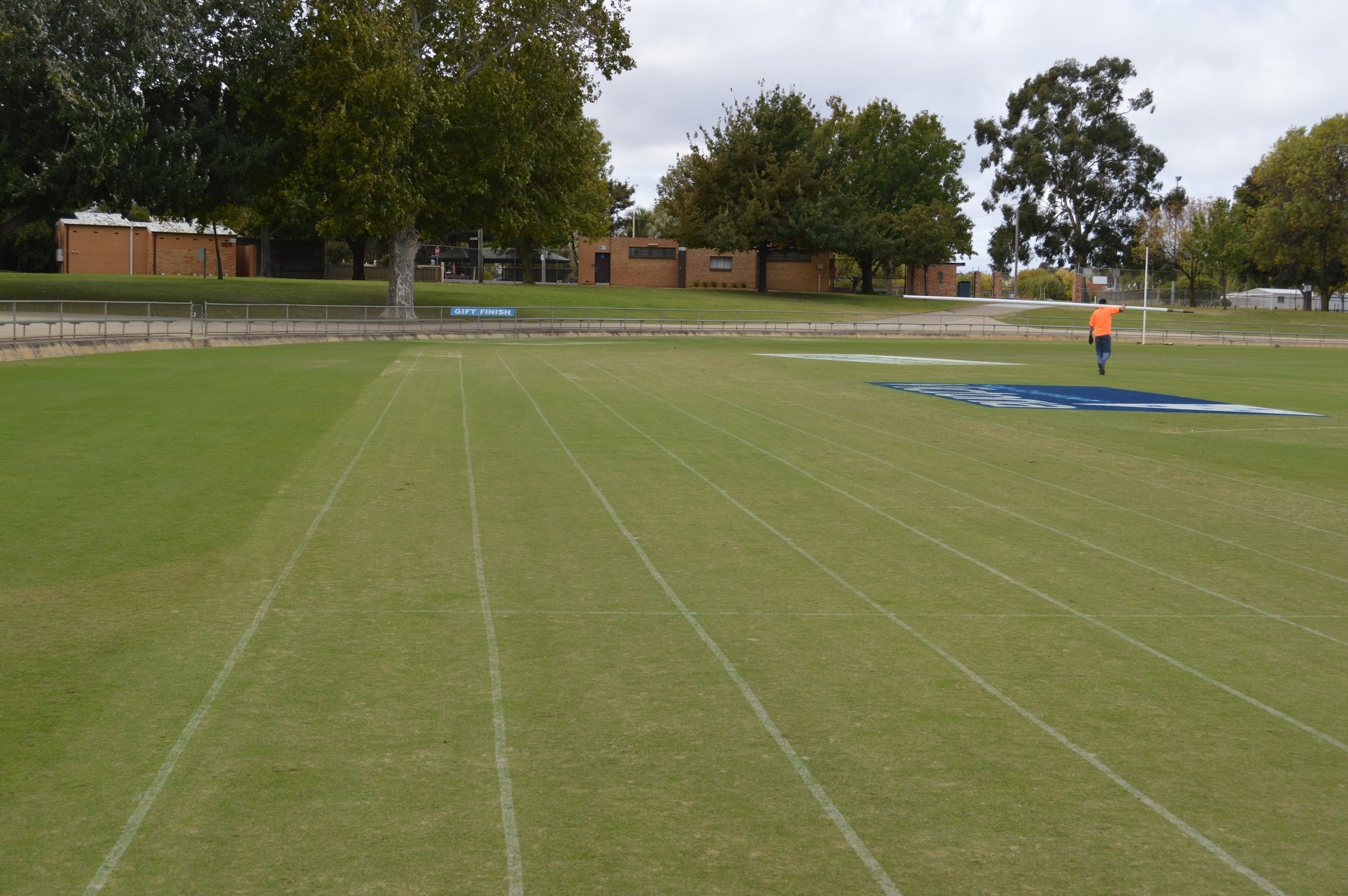
Stawell Central Park Track

On Easter Saturday the heats are conducted, with the winner of each heat going through to the semi-finals along with the next best fastest times. On Easter Monday, the six semi-finals are run approximately two hours before the final, with only semi-final winners advancing to the final. Six semi-finals were first run in 1988, before which there were only five semi-finals.

The Gift is run on a 120 m grass track in front of the 100-year-old Stawell Grandstand, and the athletes run in lanes that are separated by lane ropes rather than painted lines.

The idea of the handicap system is that all runners should, theoretically, cross the line at the same time. The handicapper works out what mark or handicap the runner will have according to their previous performances in sprint events. Currently the maximum handicap is 10 metres, although this is occasionally increased to 11.

Each metre in handicap denotes approximately a tenth of a second in time. Race winners are often those that are able to "beat the handicapper", in that they need to perform well enough to qualify for the event and the finals, but below what they are truly capable of, so that they receive a handicap that gives them the best chance of a victory. The handicapping system often ends up pitting local runners against international professionals.

Gambling is allowed in the venue, and there is an extensive bookmaker's compound.

While the Stawell Gift is the feature race, the meeting also includes many other races, with more than sixty events taking place over the three-day meeting. The Women's Gift has run since 1989. In 2015, the Women's Gift had equal prizemoney with the men's for the first time.

== Records ==
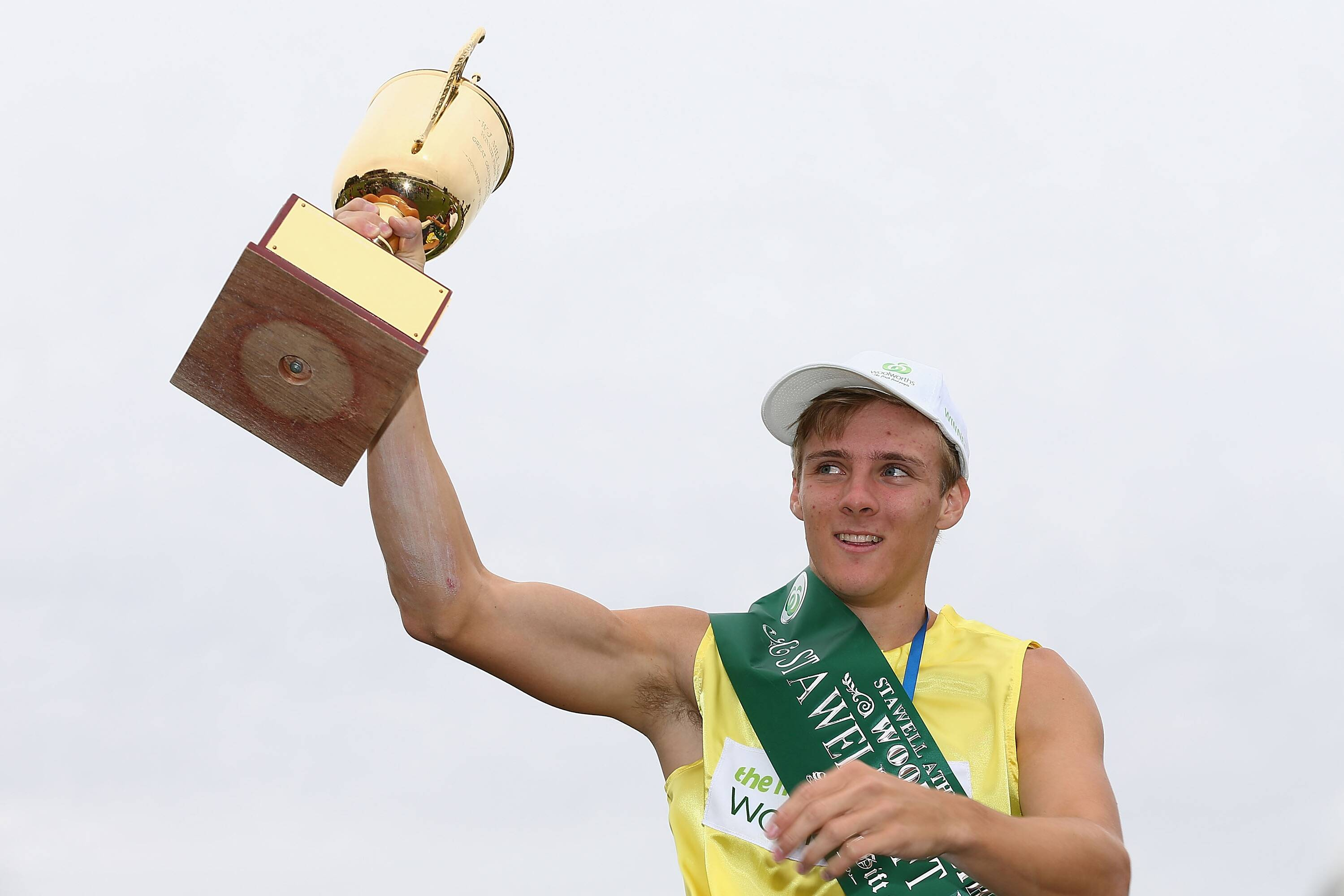
2016 Winner: Isaac Dunmall

=== Winners – Men's Stawell Gift ===
The list of winners of the Stawell Gift:

Year	Winning Runner	City/Town	County/State/Territory	Nation	Handicap (yd or m)	Time/s
1878	William J Millard	Condah	Victoria	Australia	3 yards	12.75
1879	E.S. Grose	Creswick	Victoria	Australia	6.5	13
1880	C.G. Witney	Brighton	Victoria	Australia	7.5	12.7
1881	J. Rodgers	Avoca	Victoria	Australia	9	12
1882	A.B. Parkinson	Sale	Victoria	Australia	11	12.75
1883	Bobby Kinnear	Dimboola	Victoria	Australia	14	12.5
1884	W. Smith	Melbourne	Victoria	Australia	7.5	12
1885	Walter Mummery	Bowman's Forest	Victoria	Australia	10	12.25
1886	W.B Clarke			England	7	11.75
1887	J. Brown	Balmoral	Victoria	Australia	12	11.75
1888	Charles Bingham	Fitzroy	Victoria	Australia	10.5	11.75
1889	E.S Skinner			U.S.A	9	12
1890	J. Midson	Eaglehawk	Victoria	Australia	11	11.875
1891	H. Martin	Maryborough	Victoria	Australia	13	11.75
1892	A. Heppner	Port Melbourne	Victoria	Australia	12	12
1893	E.J. Hough	Mudgee	New South Wales	Australia	12.5	11.5
1894	P.J. Breen	Gippsland	Victoria	Australia	11	11.75
1895	W.E. Joy	Dunolly	Victoria	Australia	5	12.25
1896	R.G. Nesbitt	Adelaide	South Australia	Australia	11.5	12.5
1897	George Stuckey	North Melbourne	Victoria	Australia	12	12.2
1898	J.S. Lewis	Euroa	Victoria	Australia	14	11.8
1899	Norm Clark	Rosebery	South Australia	Australia	14.5	11.8
1900	Dave Strickland	Manzies	Western Australia	Australia	10	12
1901	E.T. Kenny	Woodend	Victoria	Australia	14	12
1902	Alf Tredinnick	Malvern	Victoria	Australia	11.5	12.2
1903	H. Dew	Adelaide	South Australia	Australia	12	12.0
1904	J.F. Flanagan	East Melbourne	Victoria	Australia	12	12.2
1905	C.N. McKenzie	Mount Gambier	South Australia	Australia	10.5	12
1906	E.W. Thompson	Abbotsford	Victoria	Australia	10	12.2
1907	C.W. Knox	Numurkah	Victoria	Australia	12.5	12.4
1908	Chris King	Rutherglen	Victoria	Australia	12	11.8
1909	Harold Franklin Rigby	Burnie	Tasmania	Australia	11.5	11.8
1910	Tom Dancey	Dirranbandi	Queensland	Australia	13	11.6
1911	D.H Devine	Stawell	Victoria	Australia	13	11.4
1912	Ernest Carter	Kew	Victoria	Australia	11.5	12.2
1913	Ernest George	North Melbourne	Victoria	Australia	12.5	12.2
1914	Billy Robinson	Maldon	Victoria	Australia	12	11.8
1915	E. Fleming	Elphinstone	Victoria	Australia	10	11.4
1916	C.P. Cassidy	South Melbourne	Victoria	Australia	13.25	12
1917	F.C Swindells	Moonee Ponds	Victoria	Australia	11.75	12.2
1918	A. Roach	Melbourne	Victoria	Australia	14	12.6
1919	H.W. Evans	Abbotsford	Victoria	Australia	10.5	12.2
1920	A.G. Cashmore	Balliang	Victoria	Australia	7	12.4
1921	L.J. Jennings	Parkville	Victoria	Australia	10.25	12.4
1922	P.L. Till	Cobden	Victoria	Australia	10.5	11.7
1923	Jack E. Curran	Stawell	Victoria	Australia	9	12
1924	Bill Twomey, Sr.	Stawell	Victoria	Australia	8.5	12.1
1925	Tim. Banner	Carthcart	Victoria	Australia	5	12.15625
1926	W.G. Allen	Coburg	Victoria	Australia	9.5	12 4/16
1927	Tom Miles	Bundaberg	Queensland	Australia	10	12.0625
1928	Lynch Cooper	Jeparit	Victoria	Australia	8	11.9375
1929	Clarrie Hearn	Tocumwal	New South Wales	Australia	10	11.9375
1930	R.K. Hodge	Lakes Entrance	Victoria	Australia	11.75	11.8125
1931	Frederick J. Ralph	Richmond	South Australia	Australia	9.5	11 14/16
1932	Roy L. Barker	Yarrawonga, then Essendon	Victoria	Australia	11.75	12 2/16
1933	Cyril G. "Goldie" Heath	Baileston Est, (Nagambie)	Victoria	Australia	11	11 10/16
1934	Tom L. Roberts	Mulwala	New South Wales	Australia	9.75	11 9/16
1935	M.M. Bishop	Port Pirie	South Australia	Australia	7.5	12
1936	Ron McCann	Castlemaine	Victoria	Australia	6.5	12 4/16
1937	Frank A. Bradley	Coolamon	New South Wales	Australia	10	12
1938	Jack Grant	Geelong	Victoria	Australia	11.5	11 11/16
1939	L.W. Sprague	Ballarat	Victoria	Australia	9.5	11 14/16
1940	A.J. Reid	Port Augusta	South Australia	Australia	8.5	12 3/16
1941	Ken Hutton	Devonport	Tasmania	Australia	7.25	12 6/16
1942	No Stawell Gift due to World War II					
1943	No Stawell Gift due to World War II					
1944	No Stawell Gift due to World War II					
1945	No Stawell Gift due to World War II					
1946	Tommy Deane	Wahring	Victoria	Australia	7	11 14/16
1947	Arthur Martin	Ballarat	Victoria	Australia	4.5	11 14/16
1948	Tom Brudenall	Ballarat	Victoria	Australia	8	12 3/16
1949	J.E. Cann	Broken Hill	New South Wales	Australia	8.25	11 15/16
1950	Ken Trewick	Brisbane	Queensland	Australia	10	11 15/16
1951	Gerald Hutchinson	Brighton	Victoria	Australia	8	11 13/16
1952	Lance Mann	Albury	New South Wales	Australia	7.25	11 14/16
1953	Roy Hart	Chelsea	Victoria	Australia	5.75	12
1954	Jack Hayes	Rutherglen	Victoria	Australia	9	11 8/10
1955	John O'Donnell	Preston	Victoria	Australia	8.75	12
1956	Bill Williams	Altona	Victoria	Australia	12	11 8/10
1957	Jack Carr	Bacchus Marsh	Victoria	Australia	10.5	11 8/10
1958	Malcolm Durant	Ascot Vale	Victoria	Australia	8.5	11 8/10
1959	George Treacey	Northcote	Victoria	Australia	11.25	11 8/10
1960	Bill McCann	Dimboola	Victoria	Australia	6.75	11 8/10
1961	Colin Savage	Nunawading	Victoria	Australia	6.25	12 2/10
1962	Neil Beachley	Rosanna	Victoria	Australia	8.25	12 1/10
1963	A.J (John) Bell	Moonee Ponds	Victoria	Australia	12	12
1964	Noel Hussey	Echuca	Victoria	Australia	8.5	12.1
1965	Bruce Cox.	Brighton	Victoria	Australia	7.5	12
1966	Bill Howard	Wodonga	Victoria	Australia	8.75	11.9
1967	Bill Howard	Wodonga	Victoria	Australia	5.75	11.6
1968	Ian Miller	Surry Hills	Victoria	Australia	9.75	11.6
1969	Barry McLeod	Braybrook	Victoria	Australia	7.75	12
1970	Barry Foley	Ascot Vale	Victoria	Australia	11	11.8
1971	Treva McGregor	Templestowe	Victoria	Australia	7.25	11.7
1972	Barry Foley	Ascot Vale	Victoria	Australia	7.5	11.8
1973#	Bernie Moss	Croydon	Victoria	Australia	10.75 mts	12.1
1974	Peter Durham	Ripponlea	Victoria	Australia	7.25	12.0
1975	Jean-Louis Ravelomanantsoa			Madagascar	Scratch	12.0
1976	Allen Pollock	Heidelberg	Victoria	Australia	8.5	12.1
1977	Warren Edmonson			U.S.A	1.25	12.0
1978	Steve Proudlock	Gunnedah	New South Wales	Australia	8	11.9
1979	Noel McMahon	Ivanhoe	Victoria	Australia	8.25	12.0
1980	John Dinan	Viewbank	Victoria	Australia	5.5	12.3
1981	George McNeill	Tranent	Scotland	Gt. Britain	4	11.9
1982*	Chris Perry	Malvern	Victoria	Australia	7	12.19
1983	Dallas O'Brien	Bentleigh	Victoria	Australia	6	12.22
1984	Paul Singleton	Jilliby	New South Wales	Australia	5	11.95
1985	Paul Young	Essendon	Victoria	Australia	10.75	12.07
1986	Glen Chapman	Albury	New South Wales	Australia	7	12.01
1987	Russell Elliott	Preston	Victoria	Australia	8.25	12.13
1988	Scott Antonitch	Roselands	New South Wales	Australia	6	12.28
1989	Simon McIntyre	Wagga Wagga	New South Wales	Australia	6	12.14
1990	Dean Capobianco	Kalamunda	Western Australia	Australia	2.25	12.29
1991	Steve Brimacombe	Eltham	Victoria	Australia	6.75	11.93
1992	Andrew McManus	Essendon	Victoria	Australia	7	12.03
1993	Jason Richardson	Caulfield South,	Victoria	Australia	7.5	11.94
1994	Rod Lewis	Ringwood	Victoria	Australia	7.5	12.05
1995	Glenn Crawford	Katamatite	Victoria	Australia	6.5	11.79
1996	Steve Hutton	Alberton	South Australia	Australia	6	12.26
1997	Daniel Millard	Mount Gambier	South Australia	Australia	10.75	11.98
1998	Dale Seers	Edithvale	Victoria	Australia	7.75	12.04
1999	Rodney Matthews	Buninyong	Victoria	Australia	9.5	11.91
2000	Jarram Pearce	Wodonga	Victoria	Australia	8	12.01
2001	Andrew Pym	South Riverview	New South Wales	Australia	7.75	11.97
2002	Stuart Uhlmann	Cedar Grove	Queensland	Australia	6.75	11.98
2003	Josh Ross	North Lambton	New South Wales	Australia	7	11.92
2004	Jason Hunte			Barbados	4.25	12.07
2005	Josh Ross	Gillieston Heights	New South Wales	Australia	Scratch	12.36
2006	Adrian Mott	Essendon	Victoria	Australia	7.25	11.98
2007	Nathan Allen	Toowoomba	Queensland	Australia	5.25	12.35
2008	Sam Jamieson	Williamstown	Victoria	Australia	6.00	12.09
2009	Aaron Stubbs	Lismore	New South Wales	Australia	7.25	11.87
2010	Tom Burbidge	Canberra	Aus. Cap. Territory	Australia	8.75	12.01
2011	Mitchell Williams	Gold Coast	Queensland	Australia	6.50	12.18
2012	Matthew Wiltshire	Ballarat	Victoria	Australia	8.00	12.22
2013	Andrew Robinson	Launceston	Tasmania	Australia	7.25	12.01
2014	Luke Versace	Bayside	Victoria	Australia	10.0	12.33
2015	Murray Goodwin	Gold Coast	Queensland	Australia	6.5	12.10
2016	Isaac Dunmall	Brisbane	Queensland	Australia	6.75	12.17
2017	Matthew Rizzo	Langwarrin	Victoria	Australia	7.5	12.01
2018	Jacob Despard	Lalor	Victoria	Australia	10.0	12.12
2019	Dhruv Rodrigues-Chico		Victoria	Australia	7.0	12.11
2020	No Stawell Gift due to the COVID-19 pandemic in Australia					
2021	Edward Ware	Mitcham	Victoria	Australia	9.75	12.19
2022	Harrison Kerr	Park Orchards	Victoria	Australia	9.25	11.85
2023	Ryan Tarrant	Melbourne	Victoria	Australia	3.75	12.23
2024	Jack Lacey	Bayswater North	Victoria	Australia	9.5	12.27
2025	John Evans	Adelaide	South Australia	Australia	9.75	11.94
2026	Jake Ireland *	Warrandyte/Warrandyte South	Victoria	Australia	5.0	12.05
Year	Winning Runner	City/Town	County/State/Territory	Nation	Handicap (yd or m)	Time/s

Notes:
# Converted to metric distances in 1973.
* Commenced electronic timing in 1982.

- Jacob Despard (2018) is formerly from Tasmania
- Jake Ireland was declared the new winner (2026) after Olufemi Komolafe was stripped of the win for drug use

=== 1878: First winner ===
The inaugural winner was William J. "Bill" Millard (1855–1939), a farmer from Condah, Victoria, who reputedly trained by chasing kangaroos. Millard, running off 3 yards, won the race when the leading runner, W.J. Lambell, of Birregurra, running off 11 yards, fell two yards before the finish of the race. In 1889, aged 34, he won the 220 yards handicap at Stawell, running off 18 yards; and, at the same meeting, having been run out in the Gift's heats, he came third (off 11 yards) in the consolation race, the 120-yard Jubilee Handicap. Millard married twice, had 22 children, and died in 1939. His great-grandson, Daniel Millard, won the Stawell Gift in 1997.

=== Winners from scratch ===
Only two people have ever won the men's race running from scratch (0 m handicap):

- Multiple time Malagasy Olympian Jean-Louis Ravelomanantsoa in 1975. Due to winning from scratch, Ravelomanantsoa also technically holds the fastest ever time of 12.0 seconds.
- Athens 2004 and London 2012 Olympian and multiple Australian 100m and 200m champion Joshua Ross in 2005.

Three women have won from scratch

- Melissa Breen in 2012.
- Bree Rizzo in 2025.
- Sha'Carri Richardson in 2026.

=== Multiple winners ===
Three sprinters have won the race more than once:

- Bill Howard (1966, 1967) (the only back-to-back winner);
- Barry Foley (1970, 1972);
- Joshua Ross (2003, 2005).

=== Stawell Gift Olympians ===
Five Australian Olympians have won the Stawell Gift:

- Dean Capobianco (1990) – 1992 Olympics, Barcelona & 1996 Olympics, Atlanta
- Steve Brimacombe (1991) – 1996 Olympics, Atlanta
- Andrew McManus (1992) – 2004 Olympics, Athens (Squad only, did not compete)
- Joshua Ross (2003, 2005) – 2004 Olympics, Athens & 2012 Summer Olympics, London
- Bree Rizzo (2025) – 2024 Summer Olympics, Paris

=== VFL winners ===
The following Gift winners also played senior VFL football:

- 1897: George Stuckey, Essendon; won in 12.2 seconds, running off a handicap of 12 yards, and was also captain of Essendon's 1897 premiership team.
- 1899: Norman Clark, Carlton; won in 11.8 seconds, running off a handicap of 14½ yards.
- 1900: Dave Strickland, St Kilda, father of Shirley Strickland; won in 12 seconds, running off a handicap of 10 yards.
- 1902: Alf Tredinnick, Melbourne; won in 12.2 seconds, running off 11½ yards.
- 1912: Ernest Carter, Richmond
- 1913: Ernest George: South Melbourne Bloods
- 1914: Billy Robinson, Carlton; won in 11.8 seconds, running off 12 yards.
- 1924: Bill Twomey, Sr., Collingwood and Hawthorn, father of Bill Twomey Jr, Pat Twomey, Mick Twomey, and grandfather of David Twomey; won in 12.1 seconds, with a handicap of 8½ yards.
- 1929: Clarrie Hearn, Essendon; won in 11 and fifteen sixteenths of a second, running off a handicap of 10 yards.
- 1936: Ron McCann, Collingwood; won in 12 and 4 sixteenths of a second, running off a handicap of 6½ yards.
- 1938: Jack Grant, Geelong and Fitzroy; won in 11 and eleven-sixteenths seconds, running off a handicap of 11½ yards.
- 1952: Lance Mann, Essendon; won in 11 and fourteen-sixteenths seconds, running off a handicap of 7¼ yards.
- 1956: Bill Williams, Richmond; won in 11.8 seconds, running off a handicap of 12 yards.
- 1971: Treva McGregor, Fitzroy; won in 11.7 seconds, running off a handicap of 7¼ yards.

== Relocation ==
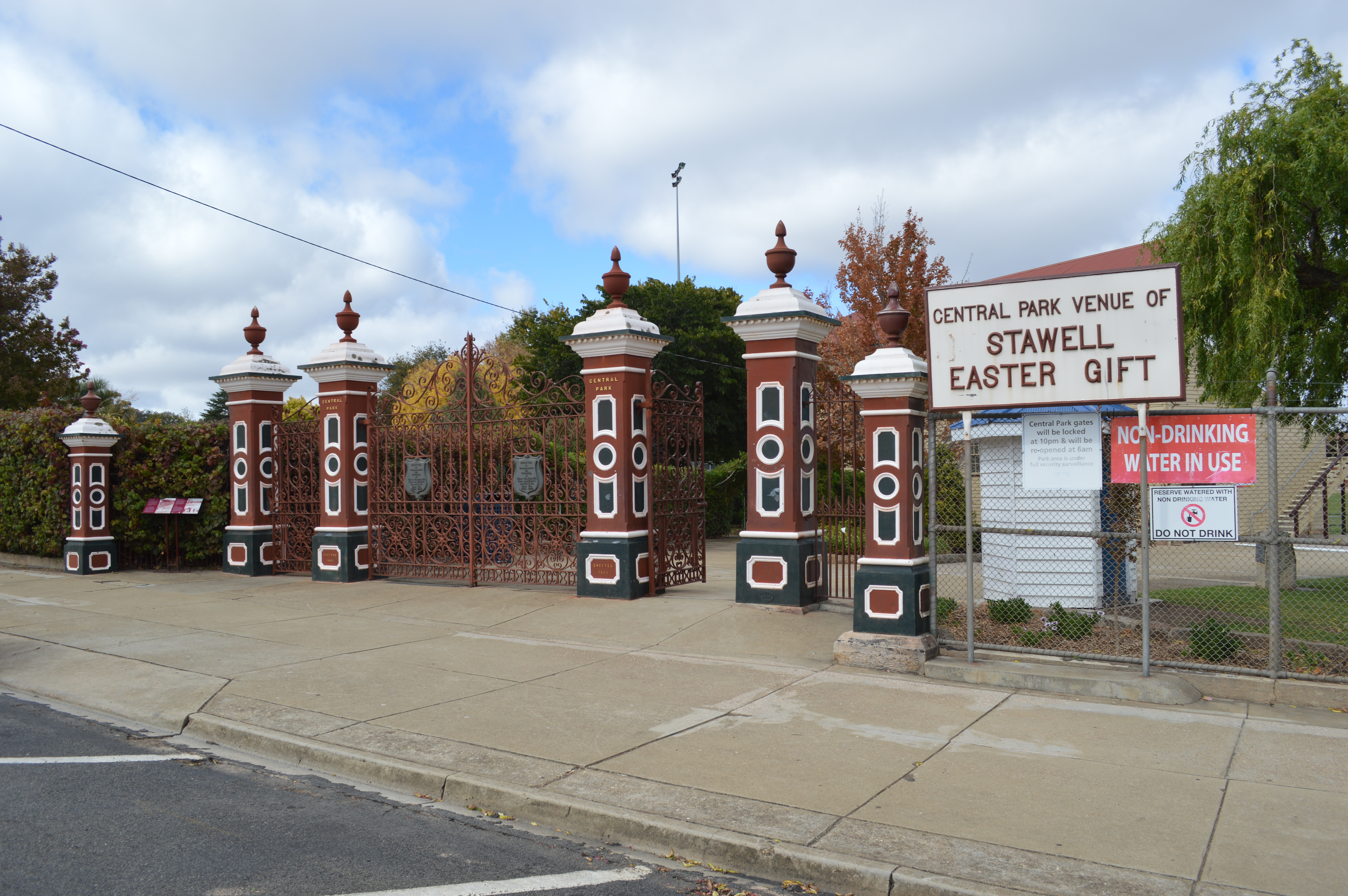
Stawell Central Park Memorial Gates

On a number of occasions there have been discussions about relocating the Stawell Gift for economic reasons.

On 14 February 2001, after much discussion about moving the event to Docklands Stadium in Melbourne, Premier Steve Bracks announced on ABC Local Radio that the Gift would be staying in Stawell and the State Government's $40,000 contribution would continue.

On 14 July 2009, it was announced that Ballarat had offered the Stawell Athletic Club more than $1 million in cash and incentives, including a $20,000 grant to the Stawell Gift Hall of Fame, to relocate the Gift from Central Park in Stawell to Ballarat City Oval for five years. The Club released a statement through Secretary Ian Lawrie stating they were considering the offer but the "decision is, without question, the most difficult ever undertaken by the Committee of the Stawell Athletic Club". He said the club would investigate and exhaust all other options to ensure the survival of Australia's most famous footrace.

On 16 September 2009 Victorian Premier John Brumby announced more than $300,000 State Government funding to keep the Stawell Gift in Stawell.

== Winners – Women's Stawell Gift ==
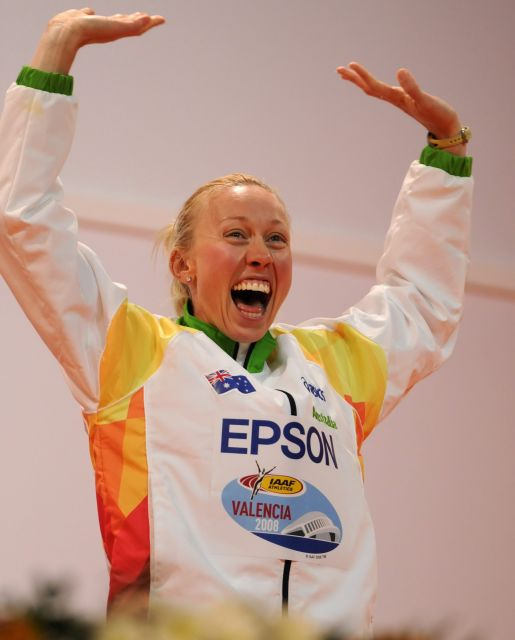
2000 Winner: Tamsyn Lewis

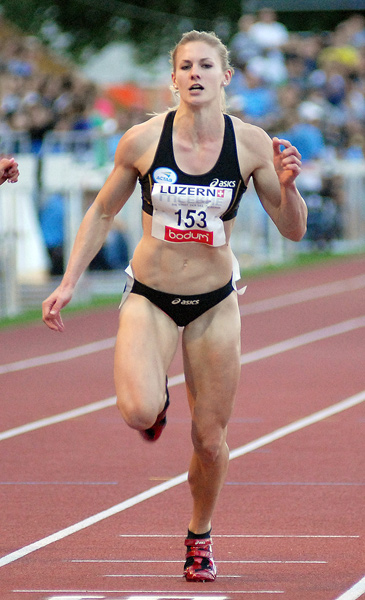
2012 Winner: Melissa Breen

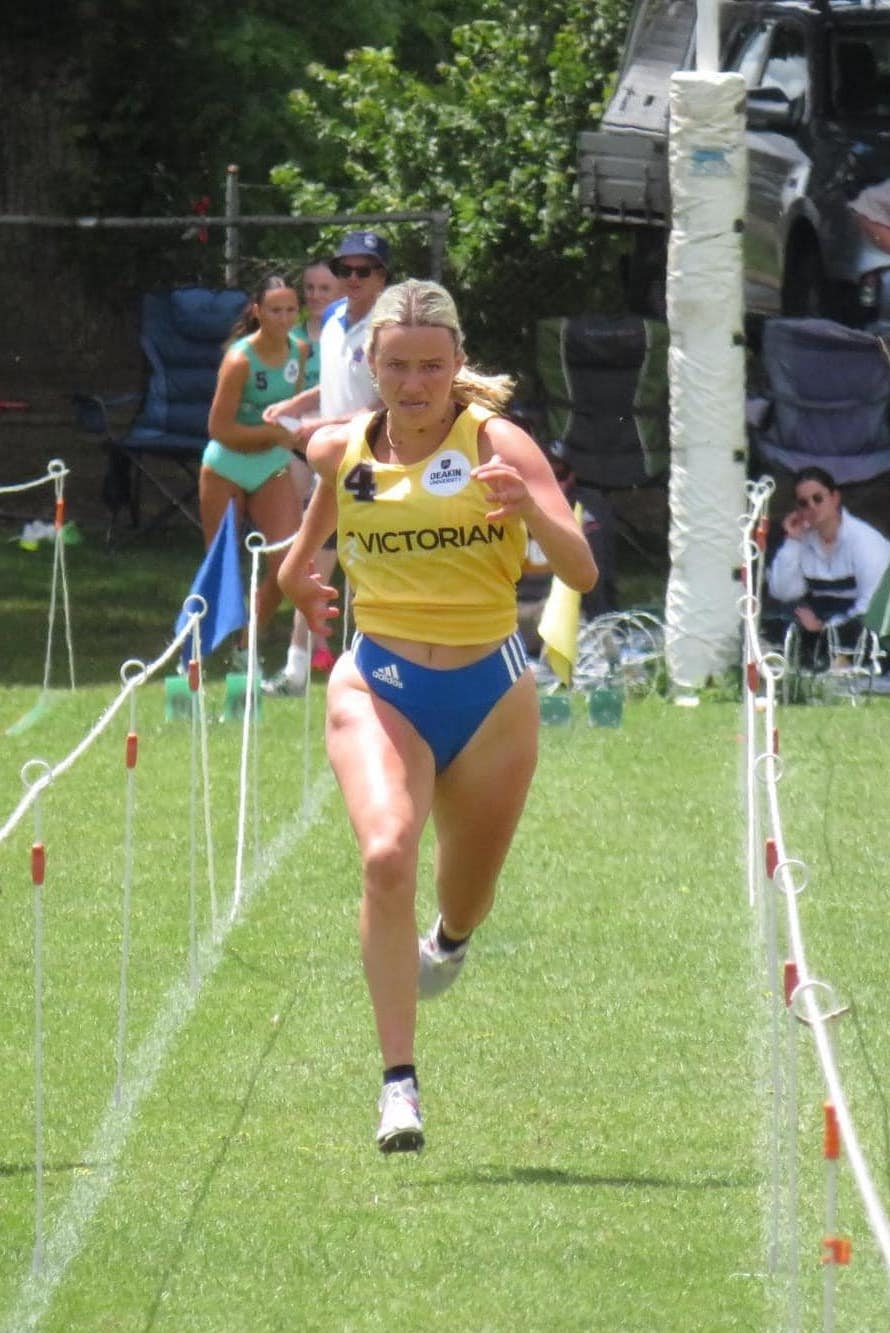
2016 Winner: Talia Martin

- Race was 100m from 1989 to 2005, and over the traditional gift distance of 120m since 2006.

Year	Runner	City/Town	County/State/Territory	Handicap (m)	Time (s)
1989	Ruth Taylor		South Australia	8.5	11.55
1990	Bernadette Marantelli		Victoria	8.75	11.67
1991	Sue Carr		Victoria	12.75	11.52
1992	Jodie O'Donell		Victoria	13	11.39
1993	Andrea Benton		Victoria	11.5	11.42
1994	Karen Parkes		Victoria	10.5	11.21
1995	Sue Carr		Victoria	13	11.57
1996	Kelly Simpson		South Australia	11	11.58
1997	Melissa De Jong		Victoria	4.75	12.05
1998	Narelle Harris		Victoria	9.25	11.70
1999	Vanessa Cowling		South Australia	18.75	11.51
2000	Tamsyn Lewis	Melbourne	Victoria	5	11.70
2001	Jennifer McGibbon		Victoria	4	11.76
2002	Snezana Ivisic		Victoria	9	11.67
2003	Kimberley Meagher		Victoria	14.5	11.15
2004	Rebecca Foster		Victoria	14.75	11.57
2005	Alison Fairweather		New South Wales	13	11.64
Women's race distance increased to 120m
2006	Samantha Brailey		Victoria	14.5	14.25
2007	Bronwyn Anderson		Victoria	10.5	14.03
2008	Catherine Brennan		Victoria	4.75	13.88
2009	Trisha Greaves		New South Wales	6	13.60
2010	Jacqueline Watt		Victoria	12.25	14.06
2011	Melissa Howard		Queensland	9.5	13.90
2012	Melissa Breen	Canberra	Australian Capital Territory	Scratch	13.95
2013	Davina Strauss		New South Wales	10	13.98
2014	Holly Dobbyn		Victoria	11.5	13.13
2015	Grace O'Dwyer		Victoria	10.25	13.40
2016	Talia Martin		Victoria	13	13.7
2017	Liv Ryan		Victoria	11	13.74
2018	Elizabeth Forsyth		Queensland	7	13.69
2019	Alexia Loizou		Victoria	13.00	13.60
2020 – No Stawell Gift Carnival > (COVID-19 pandemic)
2021	Hayley Orman	Adelaide	South Australia	9.75	13.88
2022	Carla Bull	Hervey Bay	Queensland	6	13.77
2023	Bella Pasquali	Wangaratta	Victoria	7.25	13.55
2024	Chloe Mannix-Power	Gold Coast	Queensland	4.25	13.42
2025	Bree Rizzo	Gold Coast	Queensland	Scratch	13.52
2026	Sha'Carri Richardson	Dallas, Texas	United States of America	Scratch	13.15
