= George McNeill (sprinter) =

Scottish world sprint champion (b.1947)

Personal information
- Born: 19 February 1947 (age 79)

Sport
- Country: Scotland
- Sport: Men's sprinting
Medal record
Representing Scotland
World Pro Sprint Championship
Winner	1972 Wakefield	120 yards
New Year Sprint
Winner	1970 Edinburgh	120 yards
Runner-up	1971 Edinburgh	120 yards
Stawell Gift
Winner	1981 Melbourne	120 metres
Runner-up	1979 Melbourne	120 metres

George McNeill (born 19 February 1947) is a Scottish former world professional sprint champion and the only man to have won both of the most famous professional footraces in the world – the New Year Sprint (1970) in Scotland and the Australian equivalent – the Stawell Gift (1981). McNeill had previously played professional football in the Scottish Football League for Hibernian, Greenock Morton and Stirling Albion.

== Football career ==
George McNeill
Personal information
- Date of birth: 19 February 1947 (age 79)
- Place of birth: Tranent, Scotland
- Position: Right winger

Youth career
- –1963: Tranent
- 1963–1965: Hibernian

Senior career*
Years	Team	Apps	(Gls)
1965–1968	Hibernian	1	(0)
1968	Greenock Morton	5	(1)
1968–1969	Stirling Albion	12	(4)
Total		18	(5)
- * Club domestic league appearances and goals

McNeill grew up in the Scottish mining town of Tranent. He played football for the local team, Tranent Juniors, but also played rugby union for the school fifteen. In 1963 he left school aged 16 and became an apprentice quantity surveyor. While in the fifth form at Ross High School, Tranent, he was recruited by Hibernian FC as an apprentice footballer. McNeill appeared regularly in the Hibernian reserve team in five years at the club, but played in only one senior game, a 3–0 win against St Johnstone in December 1965. He transferred to Greenock Morton in 1968 after scoring a hat trick in a trial game. He also played for Stirling Albion during the 1968–69 season.

In December 1968, McNeill was reading the Edinburgh Evening News when he noticed his name in the entries for the 1969 New Year Sprint. He had been entered by an old school friend who thought McNeill might be a better sprinter than he was a footballer. Despite being run out in the cross tie, McNeill enjoyed this new found sport and soon retired from soccer to take up a sprinting career. Having played football professionally, McNeill was prevented from participating in amateur athletic events, but was able to enter professional running events.

== Sprinting career ==
At the age of 21, George had his first start in a sprint race when he contested the heats of the 1969 New Year Sprint at the Powderhall stadium. Running off 9.5 yards, McNeill made the cross ties (semi finals) however failed to advance to the final. He was so impressed by the performance of the eventual winner David Deas, that McNeill was eager to seek out Deas' coach, Jim Bradley. Bradley had already coached three New Year Sprint winners and McNeill was eager to become the fourth. McNeill went into the gym, pounding the speedball and performing several body-weight exercises to transform his body to the condition required to improve substantially. In 1970, running off 5.50 yards, McNeill won the 120 yards New Year Sprint held at Powderhall in Edinburgh, recording a time of 11.61 seconds. It was the 100th running of the New Year Sprint.

In August 1970, McNeill broke the world professional 120 yards record, setting a fastest time of 11.14 seconds.

In 1971 McNeill ran 2nd off scratch in the New Year Sprint at Meadowbank Stadium conceding 6 yards to stablemate Wilson Young who won the event. In 1972, he was crowned world professional sprint champion after winning three of four races against USA Olympic champion Tommie Smith at the Wakefield rugby ground.

In 1972, McNeill visited Australia for the first of what turned out to be many trips abroad to run on the professional athletic circuit. He ran at Stawell in the heats of the Stawell Gift for several years including three consecutive finals from 1979 to 1981. In 1979, he was runner-up to Noel McMahon and the following year finished fifth to John Dinan. At the age of 34, McNeil returned once again in 1981 – the 100th edition of the Stawell Gift. Running off 4.0m and in one of the most exciting races ever, McNeill ran brilliantly to win the Gift at his ninth attempt in the time of 11.9secs. McNeill still remains the oldest winner of the Stawell Gift.

McNeill took up coaching in the 1980s, training Willie Fraser to win the 1985 New Year Sprint and David Clarke to 2nd place in the 1985 Stawell Gift. He has also worked in coaching football teams, including Hearts and Livingston. McNeill's son, also named George, was a Scottish youth sprint champion.

In 2003 McNeill was inducted into the Scottish Sports Hall of Fame in the Athletics category. McNeill works as an after dinner speaker.
