= Aboriginal and Islander Sports Hall of Fame =

Hall of fame for indigenous Australians

The Aboriginal and Islander Sports Hall of Fame was established in 1994 to recognise Indigenous Australians (Aboriginal and Torres Strait Islander people) that have achieved at the highest level of their chosen sport. It was a joint project of the Aboriginal and Torres Strait Islander Commission (ATSIC) and Macquarie University, under the management of Colin Tatz. Inductees are sometimes referred to as "Black Diamonds", being the name of the first book of the project, published in 1996.

== History ==
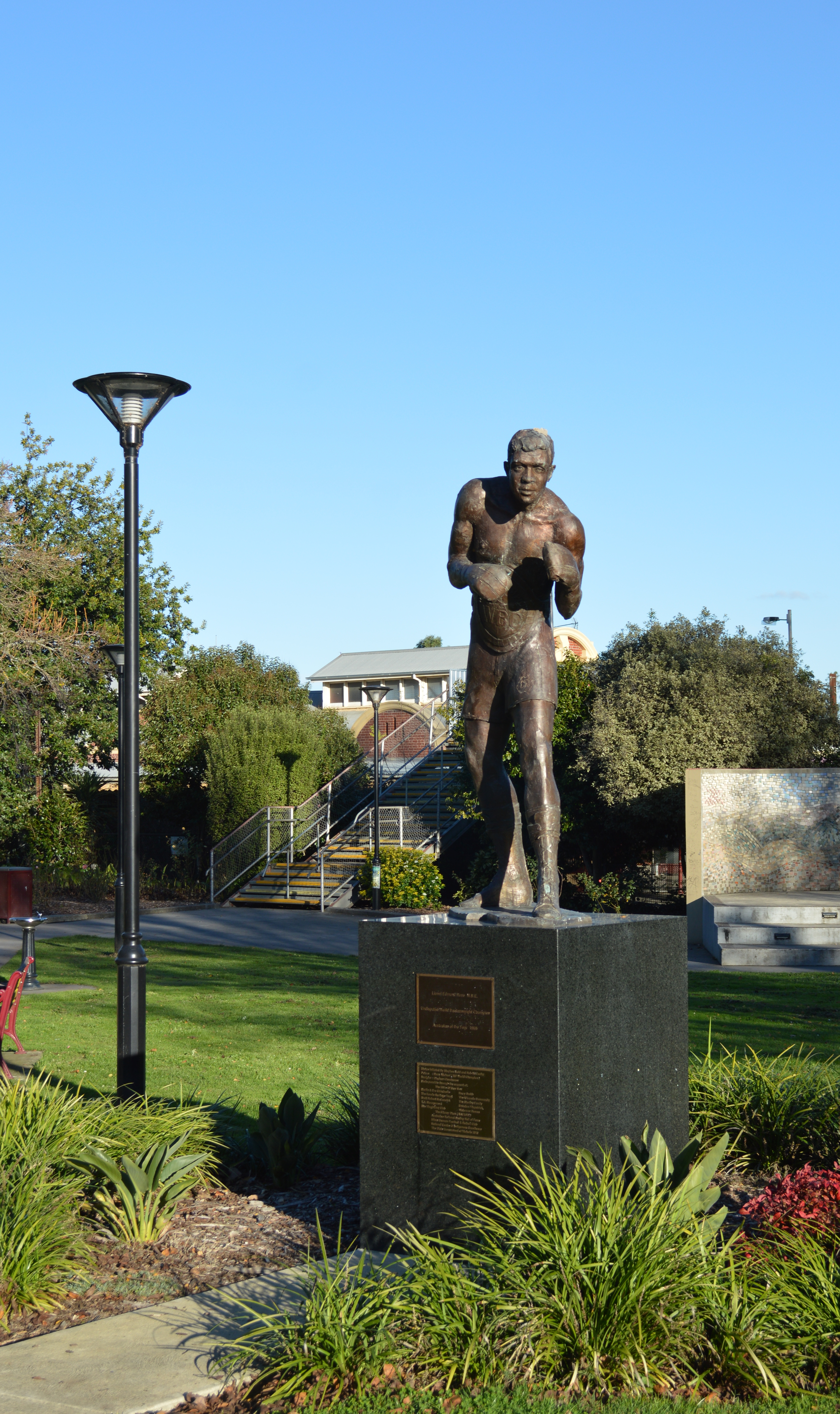
Statue of boxer Lionel Rose at Warragul, Victoria

The Hall of Fame was an outcome of Chris "Honky" Clark, a director of Aboriginal-owned and -operated sports complex in Condobolin, New South Wales. Clark saw the need to inspire indigenous youth through sports photographs. The costs of establishing a permanent photographic exhibition was too expensive. Musician and historian Ted Egan recommended a low-cost book. The outcome was the book Black Diamonds: The Aboriginal and Islander Sports Hall of Fame, published in 1996.

The Hall of Fame was a joint project of ATSIC and Macquarie University, under the management of Colin Tatz with photography by Paul Tatz.

The inaugural list of 129 members was determined by well-known Indigenous athletes: Mark Ella; Sydney Jackson; Faith Thomas; and Charlie Perkins. They were assisted by three non-Indigenous historians: Ted Egan; Colin Tatz; and Alick Jackomos.

In 1999, the list of members was increased by 43. The 1999 selection committee comprised: Arthur Beetson; Evonne Goolagong Cawley; Lloyd McDermott; Mark Ella; Gary Ella; Charlie Perkins, Ted Egan, Ken Edwards, and Tatz. The committee was assisted by three statisticians/historians: Colin Hutchinson (Australian rules footballer), David Middleton (rugby league player) and George Bracken (boxing). After the 1999 selection, the full list of 172 members with brief biographies was published in the book Black Gold : the Aboriginal and Islander Sports Hall of Fame.

As of 2000 there was no permanent home for the Hall of Fame, but there had been several photographic exhibitions in Australia. Colin and Paul Tatz donated 110 photographs from the Sports Hall of Fame to the Australian Institute of Aboriginal and Torres Strait Islander Studies (AIATSIS).

The 2008 selection panel included seven Aboriginal selectors: Arthur Beetson; Carl Currey; Gary Ella; Sydney Jackson; Lloyd McDermott; John Maynard; and Nova Peris.

The 2018 selection panel comprised Gary Ella, Katrina Fanning, Gilbert McAdam, John Maynard, Nova Peris, David Middleton, George Bracken, ColHutchinson and Colin and Paul Tatz. In 2018, there were 276 members of the Hall of Fame.

== Selection criteria ==
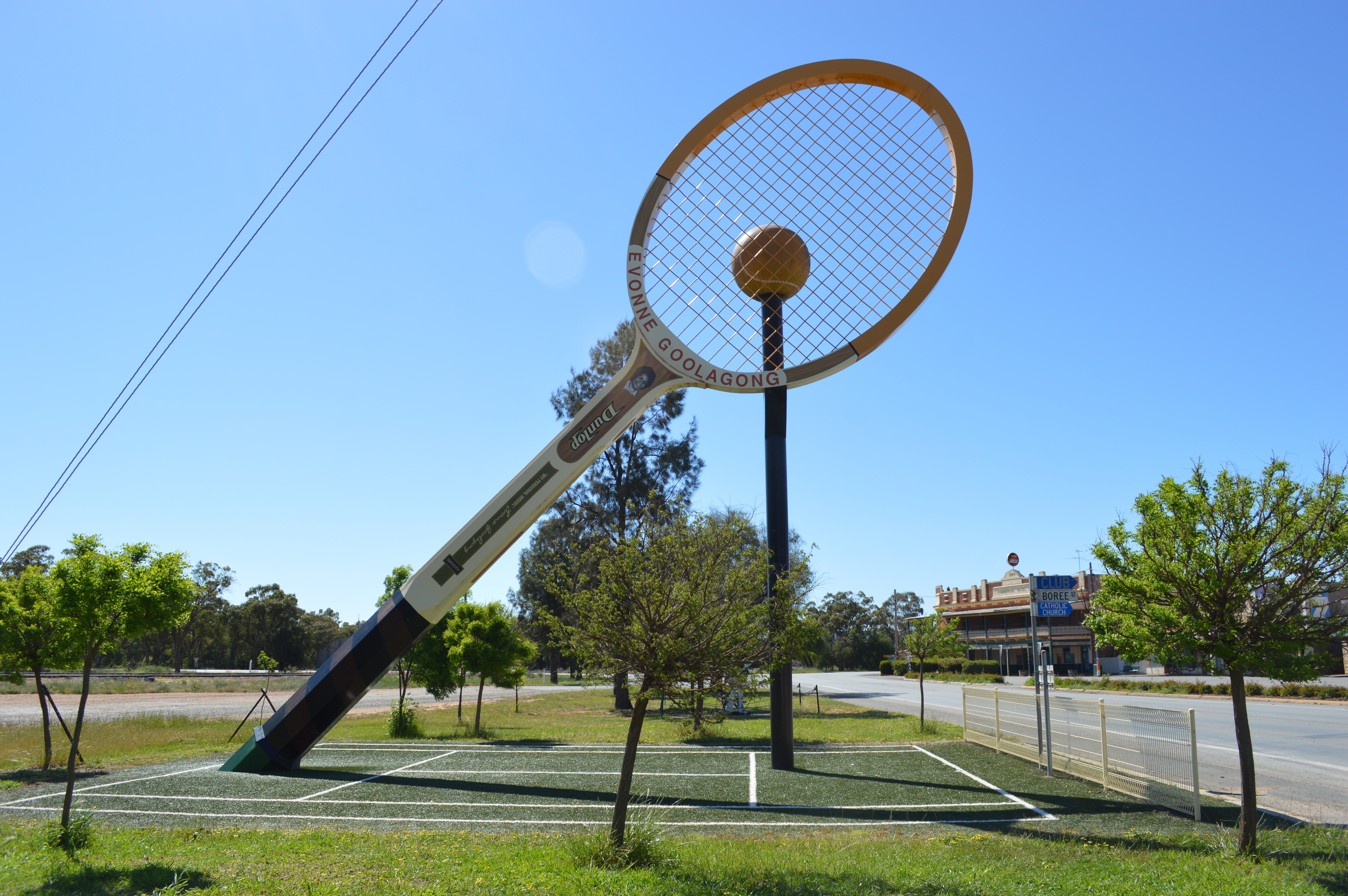
Giant tennis racquet commemorating Evonne Goolagong at Barellan, New South Wales

Members were selected if they met the following selection criteria:

- represented Australia or their state/territory
- held a national or international record or title
- achieved a notable first or distinguished performance
- in the case of Australian football, were acclaimed senior players and/or medal winners
- had notable success as referees or umpires
- those who through their coaching, administration or organisation have helped create Indigenous teams and a space for them in competitions
- person's contribution to Aboriginal or Islander identity

== Members ==
Inductees are sometimes referred to as "Black Diamonds".

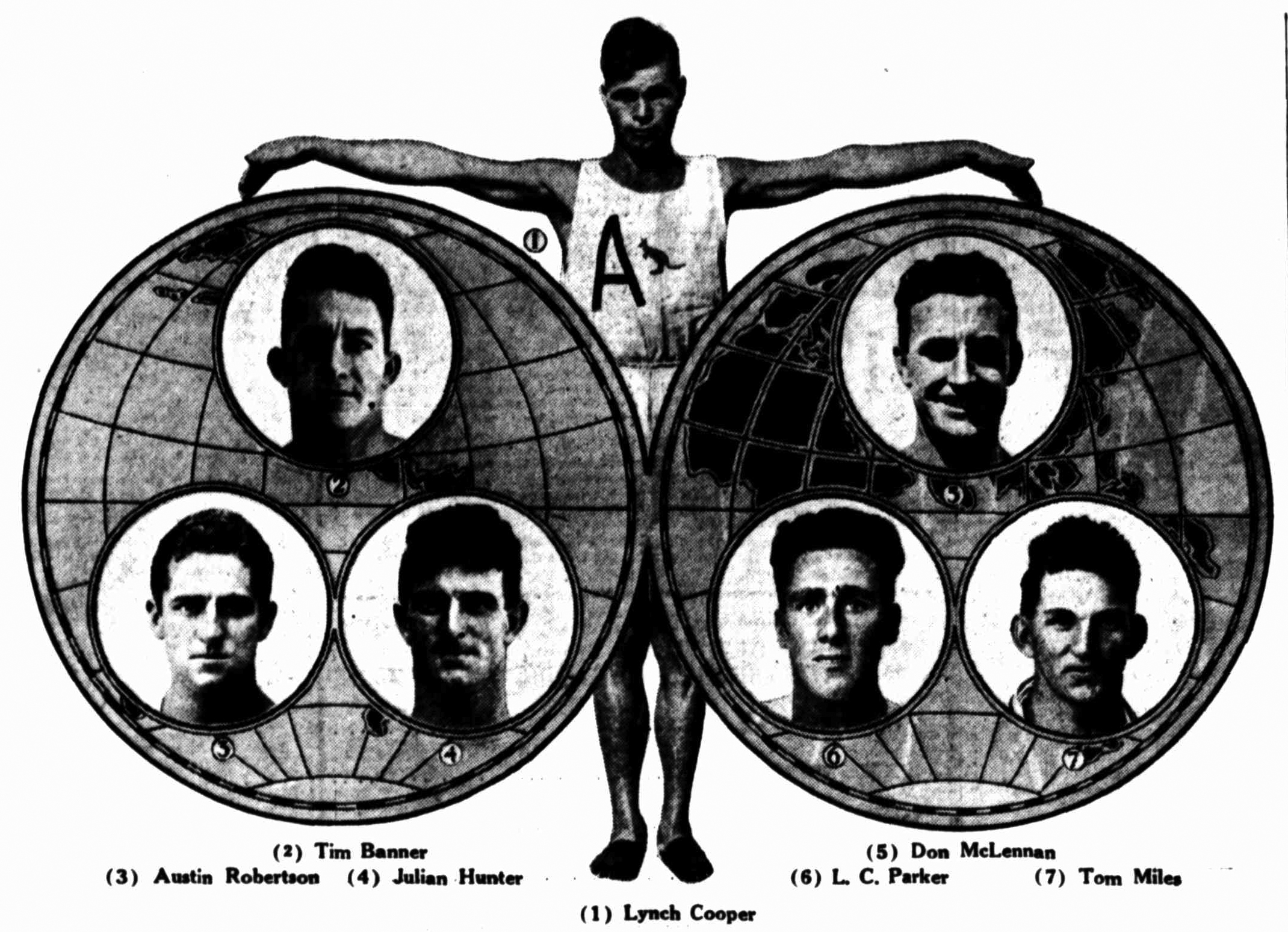
1930: Lynch Cooper & his challengers as world professional sprinter

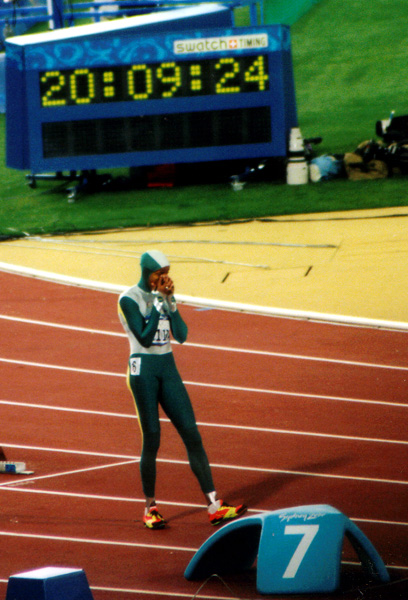
Cathy Freeman at the 2000 Sydney Olympics

Athlete	Sports	Notes
1868 Aboriginal cricket team	Cricket	Toured to England
Des Abbott	Field hockey	Olympian
Michael Ah Matt	Basketball	Olympian
Willie Allen	Australian football, shooting, soccer	
George Ambrum	Rugby league	
Bob Anderson	Athletics	
Kyle Anderson	Darts	
Bob Appo	Lawn bowls	
Leo Appo	Woodchopping	
Georgina Archer	Vigoro, Field hockey	
Albert 'Pompey' Austin	Australian football, athletics	
Ben Austin	Swimming	Paralympian
Lawrence "Baby Casius" Austin	Boxing	
Sam Backo	Rugby league	
Badger Creek team	Australian football	
Soli Bailey	Surfing	
Charmaine Barney	Darts	
Tracy Barrell	Swimming	Paralympian
Ray Barrett	Athletics	Paralympian
Ashleigh Barty	Tennis	
Kurtley Beale	Rugby union	
Arthur Beetson	Rugby league	
Elliott Bennett	Boxing	
Eddie Betts	Australian football	
Lindsay Black	Roughriding	
Nathan Blacklock	Rugby league	
Adrian Blair	Boxing	Olympian
Steve Bowditch	Squash rackets	
Matt Bowen	Rugby league	
Patrick Bowman	Athletics	
George Bracken	Boxing	Born 1935. Australian Lightweight Champion. Active 1950s to 1960s.
Gordon Briscoe	Soccer	
Roger Brown	Cricket	
Peter Burgoyne	Australian football	
Shaun Burgoyne	Australian football	
Donna Burns	Basketball	Paralympian
Barry Cable	Australian football	
Johnny Cadell	Roughriding	
Jimmy Callaghan	Show ring riding	
Mabel Campbell	Cricket	
Preston Campbell	Rugby league	
Wally Carr	Boxing	
Joel Carroll	Field hockey	Olympian
May Chalker	Golf	
Tommy Chapman	Boxing	
Baeden Choppy	Field hockey	Olympian
Trevor Christian	Boxing, Refereeing	
Phynea Clark	Field hockey	
Mal Cochrane	Rugby league	
Louisa Collins	Basketball, soccer, field hockey	
Kevin Coombs	Basketball	Paralympian
Lynch Cooper	Athletics & Football	Won 1928 Stawell Gift & 1929 World Professional Sprint Championships.
Reuben Cooper	Australian football	
Larry Corowa	Rugby league	
Gary Cowburn	Boxing	
Rohanee Cox	Basketball	Olympian
Edna Crouch	Cricket	
Glen Crouch	Rugby league	
Justann Crawford	Boxing	Olympian
Robert Crowther	Athletics	
Tony Currie	Rugby league	
Nicole Cusack	Netball	
Johnny Cuzens	Cricket	
Laurie Daley	Rugby league	
Rose Damasco	Basketball, netball, softball and field hockey	
Tom Dancey	Athletics	
Bo de la Cruz	Touch football, Rugby sevens	
Bill Dempsey	Australian football	
Steve Dennis	Boxing	
Bernie Devine	Powerlifting	
Joseph Donovan	Boxing, Judging	Olympian
Leslie Duncan	Judo	
Caremelita Dunn	Basketball, netball, softball and soccer	
Jeffrey Dynevor	Boxing	
Leanne Edmundson	Soccer	
Joanne 'Jodi' Edwards	Powerlifting	
Gary Ella	Rugby union	
Glen Ella	Rugby union	
Mark Ella	Rugby union	
Marcia Ella-Duncan	Netball	
Steve Ella	Rugby league	
Katrina Fanning	Rugby league	
Polly Farmer	Australian football	
Jeff Farmer	Australian football	
Karl Feifar	Athletics	Paralympian
John Ferguson	Rugby league	
Sharon Finnan	Netball	
Sharon Firebrace	Basketball, volleyball	
Frank Fisher	Rugby league	
Eileen Foster	Darts	
Bianca Franklin	Netball	
Lance Franklin	Australian football	
Shane Frederiksen	Touch football	
Cathy Freeman	Athletics	Olympian
Daniel Geale	Boxing	Olympian
Ron Gibbs	Rugby league	
Eddie Gilbert	Cricket	
Jason Gillespie	Cricket	
Adam Goodes	Australian football	
Leigh-Anne Goodwin	Horse racing	
Evonne Goolagong Cawley	Tennis	
Jeff Goolagong	Softball	
Michael Graham	Australian football	
George Green	Rugby league	
Ivy Hampton	Darts	
Kenneth Hampton	Athletics	
Benn Harradine	Athletics	Olympian
Jack Hassen	Boxing	
Alec Hayden	Rodeo	
Maley Hayward	Australian football	
Alec Henry	Cricket	
Stephen Hill	Australian football	
Rollo Hinton	Boxing	
Percy Hobson	Athletics	
Donna Hunter	Softball, Field hockey, netball, basketball	
Felicity Huntington	Soccer	
Greg Inglis	Rugby league	
Frank Ivory	Rugby union	
Sydney Jackson	Australian football	
Des James	Australian football	
Glenn James	Australian football	
Kaylen Janssen	Soccer	
Nathan Jawai	Basketball	
Jerry Jerome	Boxing	
Dick Johnson (rugby league)	Rugby league	
Chris Johnson	Australian football	
Joe Johnson	Australian football	
Lindsay Johnson	Rugby league	
Patrick Johnson	Athletics	Olympian
Billy Jonas	Showring riding	
David Kantilla	Australian football	
Dale Kickett	Australian football	
Derek Kickett	Australian football	
Ted Kilmurray	Australian football	
Ian King	Cricket	
Shane King	Softball	
Robert Kinnear	Athletics	
John Kinsella	Wrestling	Olympian
Peter Kirby	Athletics	Paralympian
Jim Krakouer	Australian football	
Phil Krakouer	Australian football	
Lake Tyers Team	Australian football	
Julie Landy-Ariel	Rugby league, Oztag	
Steve Larkin	Field hockey	
Warren Lawton	Athletics, goalball	Paralympian
Joanne Leisputty	Softball, indoor cricket	
Bennie Lew Fatt	Basketball, Australian football	
Clifford Lew Fatt	Basketball, Australian football	
Terry Lew Fatt	Basketball, Australian football	
Chris Lewis	Australian football	
David Lilliard	Rugby league, Youth sport	
Michael Long	Australian football	
Kevin Longbottom	Rugby league	
Greg Lovell	Woodchopping	
Cliff Lyons	Rugby league	
Mallee Park Football Club	Australian football	
Brian Mansell	Cycling	
Jack Marsh	Cricket	
Anthony Martin	Weightlifting	Olympian
Andrea Mason	Netball	
Peter Matera	Australian football	
Merv Maynard	Horse racing	Son of Fred Maynard, father of John Maynard
Gilbert McAdam	Australian football	
Wally McArthur	Rugby league	
Darby McCarthy	Horse racing	
Lloyd McDermott	Rugby union	
Norm McDonald	Australian football	
Robert McDonald	Athletics	
John McGuire	Cricket	
Kelly McKellar-Nathan	Softball	
Michael McLean	Australian football	
Andrew McLeod	Australian football	
Mal Meninga	Rugby league	
Karen Menzies	Soccer	
Stephen Michael	Australian rules	
Patrick Mills	Basketball	Olympian
Lionel Morgan	Rugby league	
John Moriarty	Soccer	
Lorrelle Morrissey	Field hockey	
Danny Morseu	Basketball	Olympian
Johnny Mullagh	Cricket	
Cheryl Mullett	Badminton	
Sandra Mullett	Badminton	
Anthony Mundine	Boxing, Rugby league	
Tony Mundine	Boxing	
Michelle Musselwhite (née Cosier)	Basketball	
Phil Narkle	Australian football	
Narwan Football Club	Rugby league	
New Norcia team	Cricket	
Doug Nicholls	Australian football	
Jade North	Soccer	Olympian
Michael O'Loughlin	Australian football	
Bruce Olive	Rugby league	
Shane Parker	Wrestling	
David Peachey	Rugby league	
Robbie Peden	Boxing	Olympian
Nova Peris	Field hockey	Olympian
Brooke Peris	Field hockey	Olympian
Charlie Perkins	Soccer	
Byron Pickett	Australian football	
Stacey Porter	Softball	Olympian
Scott Prince	Rugby league	
Cecil Ramalli	Rugby union	
Chad Reed	Motorcycling	
Amanda Reid	Swimming	Paralympian
Steve Renouf	Rugby league	
Redfern All Blacks team	rugby league	
Frank Reys	Horse racing	
Ron Richards	Boxing	
Samantha Riley	Swimming	Olympian
Cyril Rioli	Australian football	
Maurice Rioli	Australian football	
Brian Roberts	Boxing	
Frank Roberts	Boxing	Olympian
Billy Roe	Australian football	
Lionel Rose	Boxing	
Josh Ross	Athletics	Olympian
Rovers Football Club	Australian football	
Ron Saddler	Rugby league	
Wendell Sailor	Rugby league	
Charlie Samuels	Athletics	
Dave Sands	Boxing	
Adam Schreiber	Squash rackets	
Colin Scott	Rugby league	
Horrie Seden	Darts	
Dean Semmens	Water polo	Olympian
Dale Shearer	Rugby league	
Eric Simms	Rugby league	
Matt Sing	Rugby league	
Bobby Sinn	Boxing	
Delma Smith	Volleyball	
Peter St Albans	Horse racing	
St Mary's Football Club	Australian football	
Bridgette Starr	Soccer	Olympian
James Swan	Boxing	Olympian
Timana Tahu	Rugby league	
Gorden Tallis	Rugby league	
Sam Thaiday	Rugby league	
Faith Thomas	Cricket, field hockey	
Nathan Thomas	Water polo	Olympian
Hector Thompson	Boxing	
Jonathon Thurston	Rugby league	
Mark Tutton	Volleyball	
Reg Tutton	Volleyball	
Steve Tutton	Volleyball	
Twopenny	Cricket	
Kyle Vander Kuyp	Athletics	Olympian
Billy Waite	Horse racing	
Ricky Walford	Rugby league	
Andrew Walker	Rugby union	
Andrew Walker	Australian football	
Lloyd Walker	Rugby union	
Shannon Walker	Rugby sevens	
Robert Wandon	Athletics	
Gavin Wanganeen	Australian football	
Jack Watson	Roughriding	
Daniel Wells	Australian football	
Darryl White	Australian football	
Dean Widders	Rugby league	
Bobby Williams	Boxing	
Claude Williams	Rugby league, basketball	First and only Aboriginal basketball coach, in 1987
Gary Williams	Boxing	
Harry Williams	Soccer	
Jesse Williams	American football	
Jimmy Williams	Rodeo	
Jim Williams	Rugby union	
Lydia Williams	Soccer	Olympian
Mariah Williams	Field hockey	Olympian
Fred Wilson	Roughriding	
Nicky Winmar	Australian football	
Harley Windsor	Ice skating	Olympian
David Wirrpanda	Australian football	
Rebecca Young (née Anderson)	Rugby league, Rugby union	

== See also ==
National Aboriginal and Torres Strait Islander Sports Awards
