= List of Indigenous Australian firsts =

Australian Aboriginal and Torres Strait Islander people

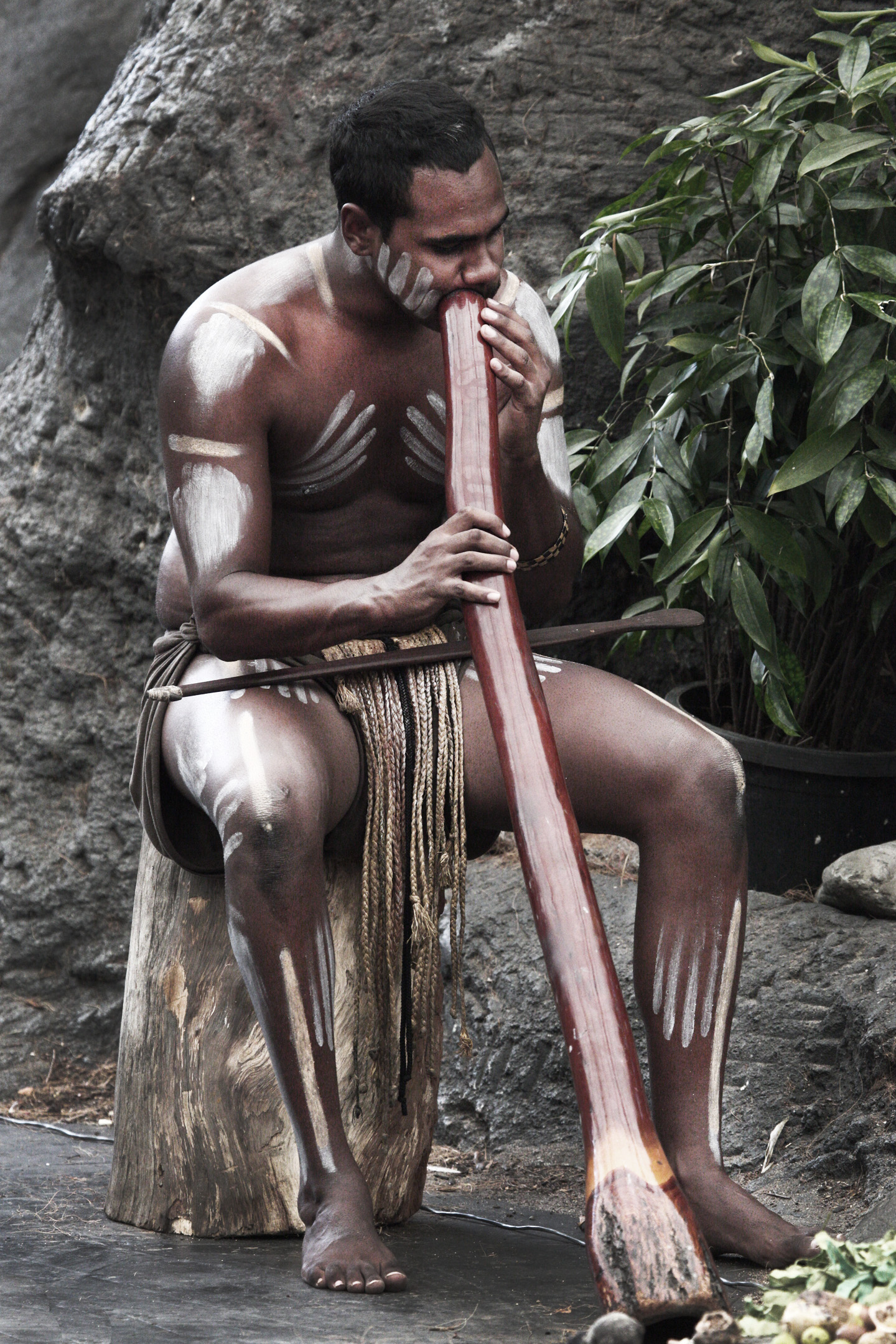
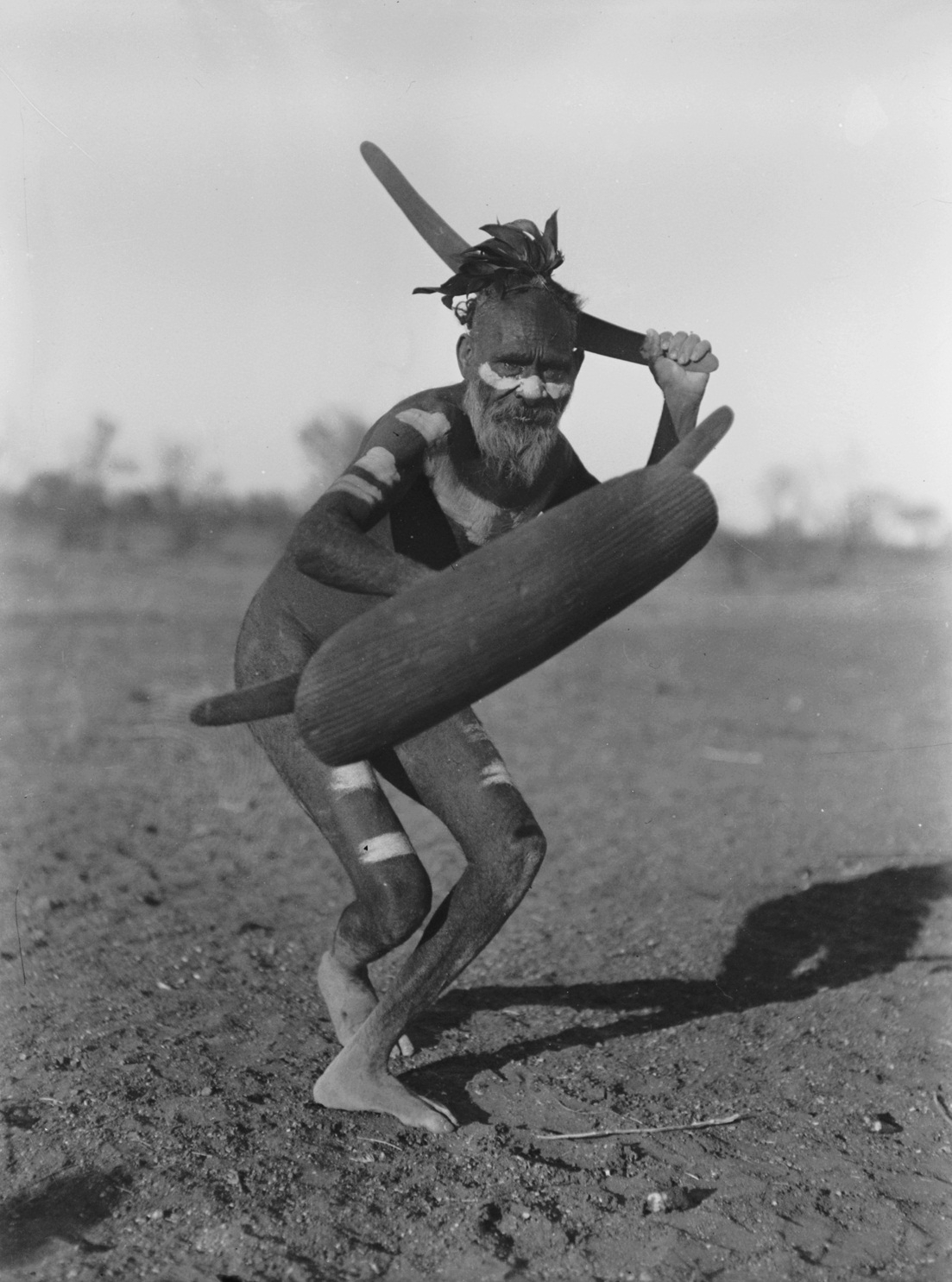
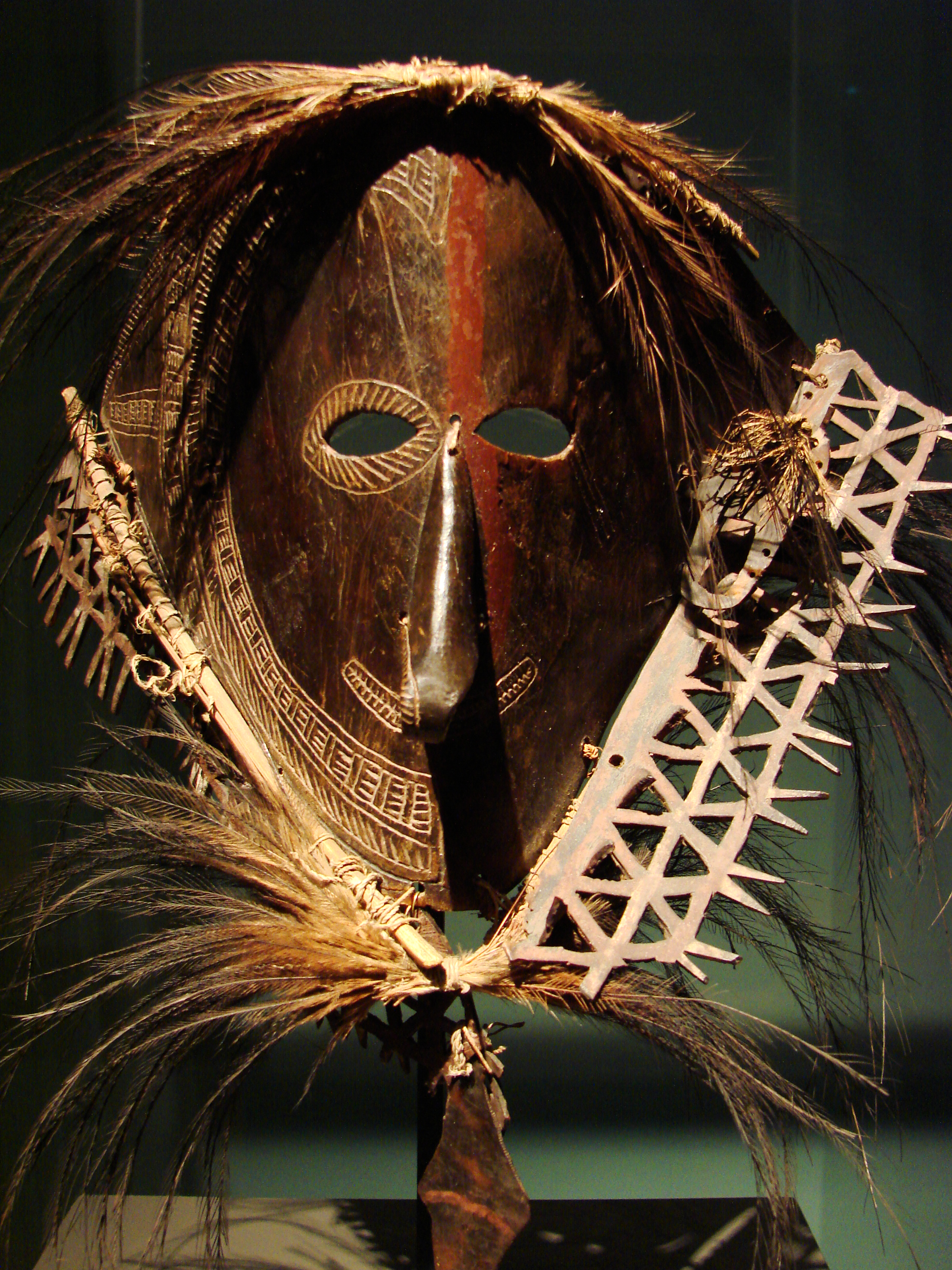
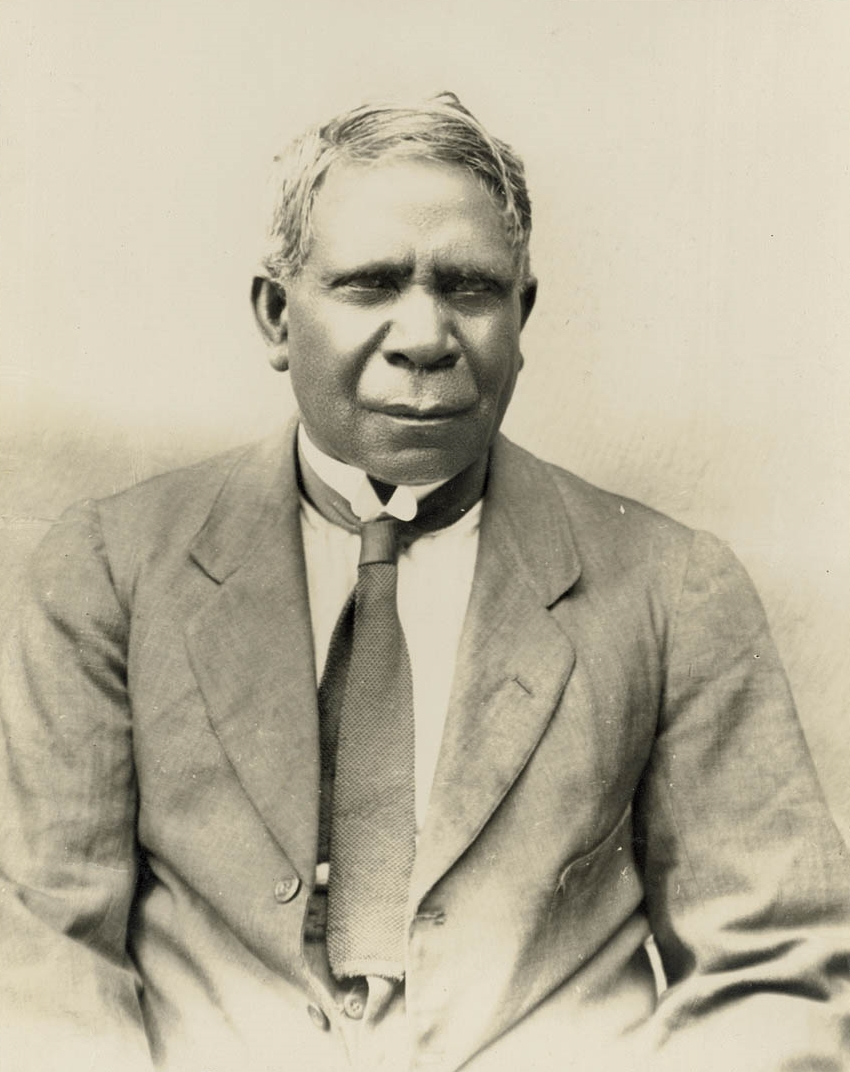
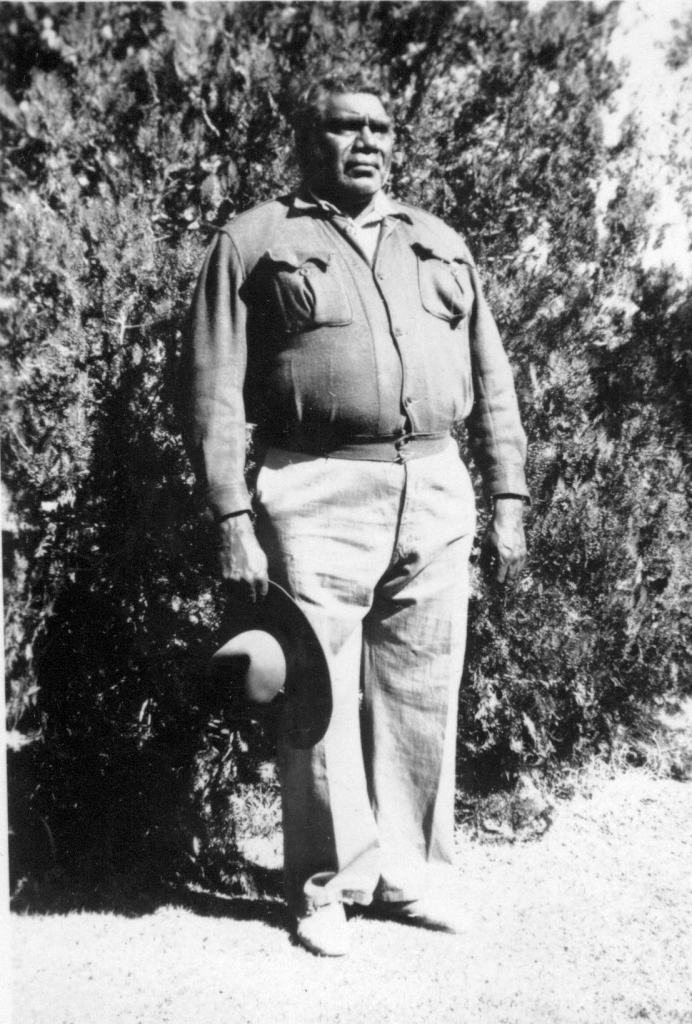
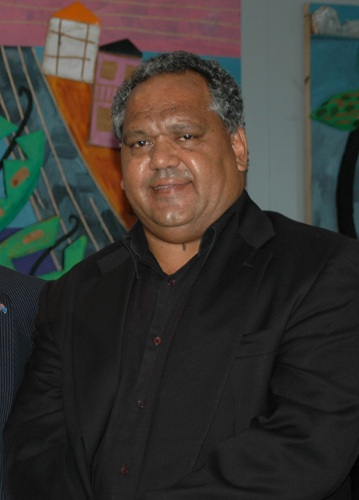
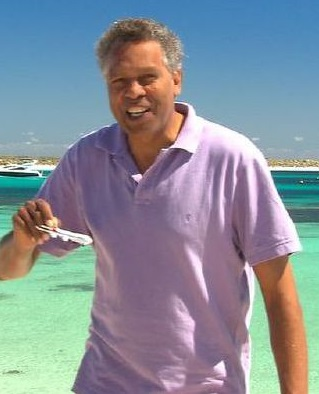
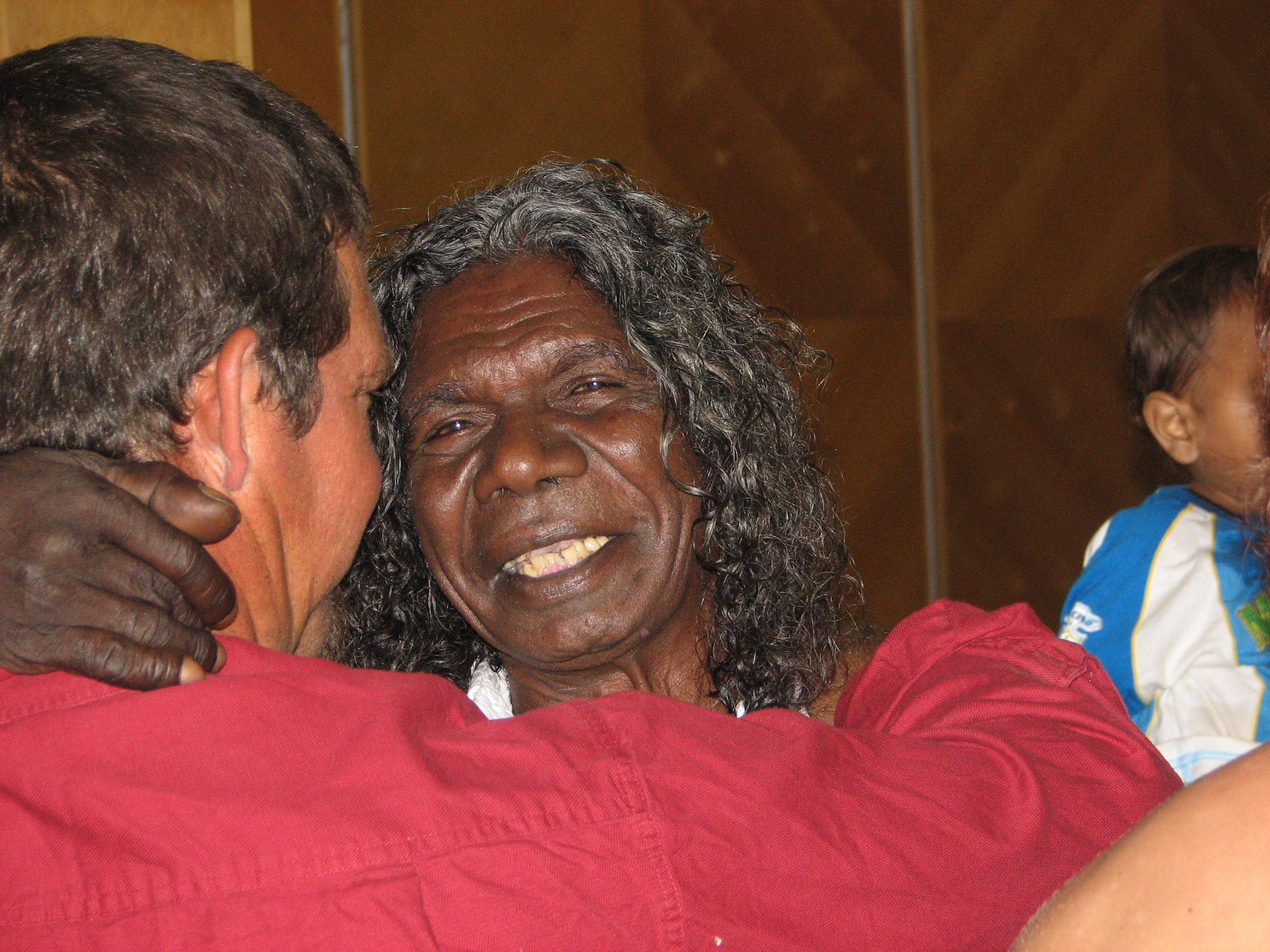
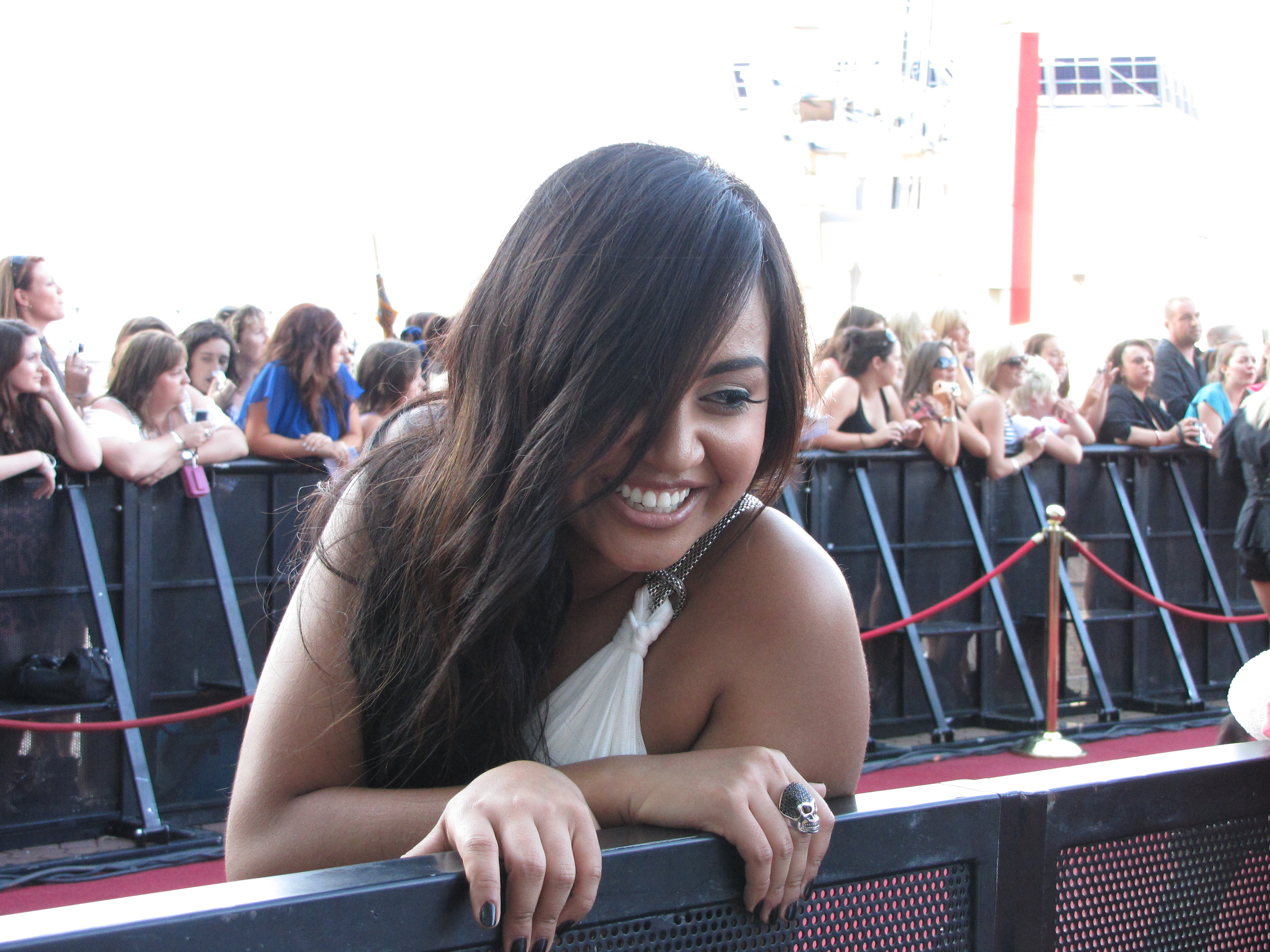
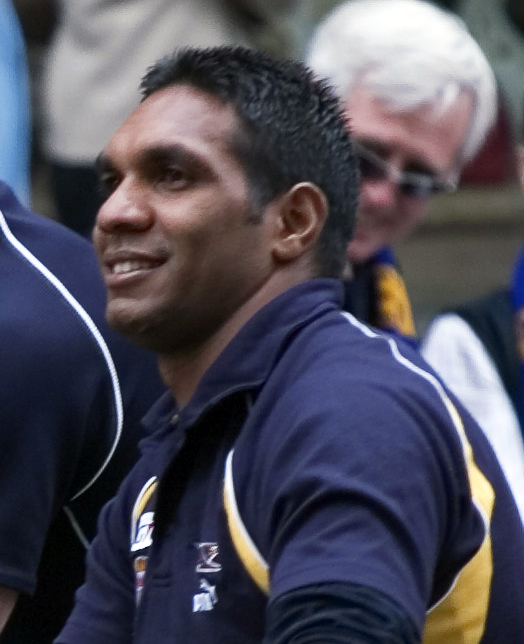
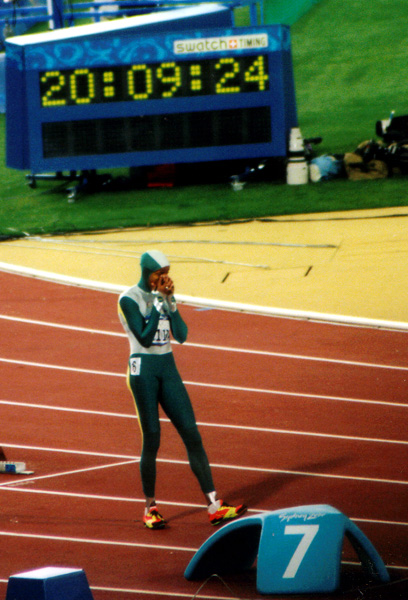
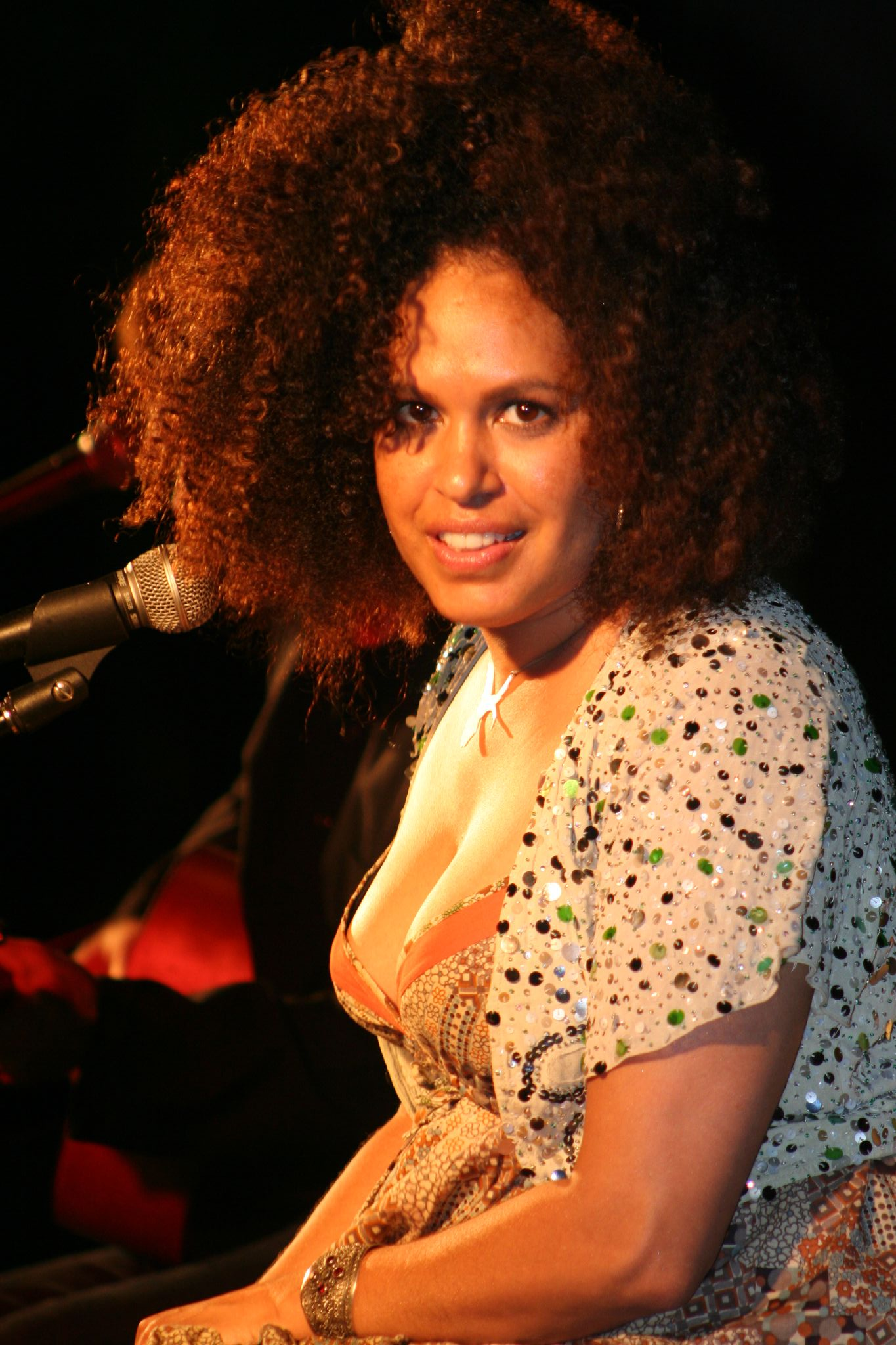
- Didgeridoo, Boomerang, Torres Strait face mask, David Unaipon, Albert Namatjira, Noel Pearson, Ernie Dingo, David Gulpilil, Jessica Mauboy, David Wirrpanda, Cathy Freeman, Christine Anu

Total population
- 517,000, 2.5% of Australia's population (in 2006)

Languages
- Several hundred Indigenous Australian languages (many extinct or nearly so), Australian English, Australian Aboriginal English, Torres Strait Creole, Kriol

Religion
- Majority Christianity, with minority following traditional animist (Dreamtime) beliefs.

Related ethnic groups
- see List of Indigenous Australian group names

Indigenous Australians are the original inhabitants of the Australian continent and nearby islands. The Torres Strait Islanders are Indigenous to the Torres Strait Islands, which are at the northernmost tip of Queensland near Papua New Guinea. The term "Aboriginal" has traditionally been applied to Indigenous inhabitants of mainland Australia, Tasmania, and some of the other adjacent islands. Since the colonisation of Australia in 1788, Indigenous Australians have been segregated from European Australians both in their rights and socially within society. The 'firsts' listed in this article contain historical steps that have changed this initial racist segregation both legally and culturally.

== 17th century ==
=== 1600s ===
- 1606
  - First known meeting between Indigenous Australians and Europeans (Mapoon, Queensland).

== 18th century ==
=== 1780s ===
- 1788
  - First Indigenous Australian to live amongst Europeans: Arabanoo.

=== 1790s ===
- 1793
  - First Indigenous Australian song performed in Europe: Bennelong, Yemmerrawanne.
- 1796
  - First Indigenous Australian to appear in print: Bennelong (see also 1949).

== 19th century ==
=== 1800s ===
- 1802
  - First Indigenous Australian to circumnavigate Australia: Bungaree.

=== 1810s ===
- 1815
  - First Indigenous Australian to be granted land by the colonial authorities: Bungaree.

=== 1830s ===
- 1835
  - First Indigenous Australian to be recorded playing western sport: Shiney (cricket in Hobart).
- 1836
  - First publication solely written and published by Indigenous Australians: Flinders Island Chronicle (twenty-nine editions published).

=== 1850s ===
- 1856
  - Indigenous Australian males first given the right to vote in elections (South Australia).

=== 1860s ===
- 1860
  - First Indigenous people to request a land grant: Collin Hood and Nora Hood.
- 1864
  - First time portions of the Bible published in an Indigenous Australian language (Ngarrindjeri).
- 1868
  - First Australian cricket team to tour overseas and the first sporting team to represent Australia abroad, is composed of Australian Aboriginal people.

=== 1870s ===
- 1870
  - First Indigenous Australian to play first-class cricket: Twopenny.
- 1871
  - First Indigenous Australian to become a deacon: James Unaipon.

=== 1880s ===
- 1883
  - First Indigenous Australian to win the Stawell Gift: Bobby Kinnear.
- 1889
  - First Indigenous Australian to play in a major Australian rules football league, South Australian Football Association (now SANFL): Harry Hewitt.

=== 1890s ===
- 1893
  - First Indigenous Australian to play representative rugby union: Frank Ivory (Queensland).
- 1895
  - Indigenous Australian women first gain the right to vote in elections (South Australia).
- 1897
  - First translation of the New Testament into an Indigenous Australian language (Dieri).
- 1899
  - First Indigenous Australian to be recorded: Fanny Cochrane Smith.

== 20th century ==
=== 1900s ===
- 1900
  - First Indigenous Australian to regularly play in a major Australian rules football league, West Australian Football Association (now WAFL): Jimmy Melbourne.
- 1904
  - First Indigenous Australian to play in the Victorian Football League (VFL): Joe Johnson.
- 1909
  - First Indigenous Australian to play first-grade level rugby league: George Green.

=== 1910s ===
- 1910
  - First time First Nations children were forcibly removed from their families as a result of government policies. Now known as the "Stolen Generation".
- 1912
  - First Indigenous Australian to win a national boxing title: Jerry Jerome (middleweight).
  - First Indigenous Australian to be awarded a medal for gallantry: Neighbour (Albert Medal).
- 1916
  - First Indigenous Australian to be awarded the Military Medal in World War I: Maitland Madge.
- 1919
  - First Torres Strait Islanders to be ordained deacons in the Anglican Church of Australia (then called the Church of England in Australia): Joseph Lui and Poey Passi.

=== 1920s ===
- 1925
  - First Indigenous Australian to tour abroad as part of open sporting team: Glen Crouch (Queensland rugby league team to New Zealand).
  - First Aboriginal Australian to be ordained deacon in the Anglican Church of Australia (then called the Church of England in Australia): James Noble.
  - First Torres Strait Islanders to be ordained priests in the Anglican Church of Australia (then called the Church of England in Australia): Joseph Lui and Poey Passi.
- 1927
  - First Indigenous Australian to have a book published: David Unaipon (Aboriginal Legends).
- 1929
  - First Indigenous Australian to win the World Professional Sprint Championship: Lynch Cooper.

=== 1930s ===
- 1932
  - First literary writing in Indigenous Australian vernacular: Sam Dintibana, in Dieri.
- 1935
  - First Indigenous Australian to be selected in the Victorian interstate Australian rules team: Doug Nicholls.
- 1938
  - First major national Indigenous day of protest: Australia Day protest by the Aborigines Progressive Association.
- 1939
  - First mass strike of Indigenous Australians: Cummeragunja walk-off.

=== 1940s ===
- 1944
  - First Indigenous Australian to be commissioned as an officer in the Australian armed forces: Reg Saunders.
  - First Indigenous military aviator: Len Waters.
- 1949
  - First federal electorate named after an Indigenous Australian: Division of Bennelong, named in honour of Bennelong.

=== 1950s ===
- 1950
  - The first named Indigenous Australian to appear on an Australian stamp: Gwoya Jungarai.
- 1954
  - First Indigenous nurse in South Australia: Lois (Lowitja) O’Donoghue
  - First Indigenous Railway Station Master: Leonard Harris
- 1957
  - First Indigenous Australian to become an Australian citizen: Albert Namatjira.
  - First Indigenous Australian to enroll in university: Margaret Williams-Weir.
- 1958
  - First Indigenous Australian woman to be selected for a national sporting side: Faith Coulthard (cricket).
  - First song written and recorded by Indigenous Australians: "Give the Coloured Boy a Chance" (written by Jimmy Little, Snr and recorded by Jimmy Little).
- 1959
  - First Indigenous Australian entertainer to appear on television: Jimmy Little.
  - First Indigenous Australian to gain a university qualification: Margaret Williams-Weir.

=== 1960s ===
- 1960
  - First Indigenous Australian to compete at the Paralympics: Kevin Coombs.
  - First Indigenous Australian to represent Australia in rugby league: Lionel Morgan.
- 1961
  - First Indigenous Australian to win the Bay Sheffield: Ken Hampton.
  - First Indigenous Australians to represent Australia in basketball: Bennie Lew Fatt and John Bonson.
- 1962
  - First Indigenous Australian to win a Gold Medal at the Commonwealth Games: Jeff Dynevor (Bantamweight boxing).
  - First Indigenous Australian to release an album: Georgia Lee (Georgia Lee Sings the Blues Down Under).
  - First Indigenous Australian to represent Australia in rugby union: Lloyd McDermott.
  - Indigenous Australians first given right to enrol to vote in Australian federal elections.
  - Indigenous Australians first given right to enrol to vote in Northern Territory elections.
- 1963
  - First time Indigenous Australians legally allowed to drink alcohol in New South Wales (30 March).
  - First Indigenous Australian to have a number one hit on the Australian music charts: Jimmy Little ("Royal Telephone").
  - First documentary recognition of Indigenous Australians in Australian law: Yirrkala bark petitions.
- 1964
  - First Indigenous Australian to publish a book of verse: Oodgeroo Noonuccal (We Are Going).
  - First Indigenous Australians to compete in an Olympic Games: Michael Ah Matt, Adrian Blair and Frank Roberts.
- 1965
  - First Indigenous Australian police officer: Colin Dillon.
  - Indigenous Australians first given right to vote in Queensland elections.
  - First all-Indigenous Australian contemporary music concert held in Sydney.
  - First novel by an Indigenous Australian author to be published in Australia: Wild Cat Falling by Mudrooroo
- 1966
  - First Indigenous Australian university degree graduates: Charles Perkins (see also 1984) and Margaret Valadian.
  - First Indigenous Australian to be ordained as a Minister of the Methodist Church: Lazarus Lamilami.
- 1967
  - Indigenous Australians allowed to be counted in the Australian census (the first census to include Indigenous Australians was 1971).
- 1968
  - First Indigenous Australian to become world champion (bantamweight boxing): Lionel Rose.
  - First Indigenous Australian to be named Australian of the Year: Lionel Rose
  - First Indigenous Australian to compete internationally in wrestling: John Kinsella.
  - First Indigenous Australian to become a state champion cyclist: Brian Mansell (Tasmania).
- 1969
  - First Indigenous Australian to play List A cricket: Ian King.
  - First legal challenge for Aboriginal title to land: Milirrpum v Nabalco.

=== 1970s ===
- 1970
  - First Indigenous Australian to play soccer for Australia: Harry Williams.
  - First Aboriginal Australian to be ordained priest in the Anglican Church of Australia (then called the Church of England in Australia): Patrick Brisbane.
- 1971
  - First Indigenous Australian to sit in the Parliament of Australia: Neville Bonner.
  - First play written by an Indigenous Australian performed in mainstream theatre: The Cherry Pickers by Kevin Gilbert.
  - First Indigenous Australian to win a Grand Slam tennis event (French Open): Evonne Goolagong.
  - First Australian rules footballer to be honoured with an MBE: Graham Farmer.
  - Australian Aboriginal flag first flown in public (designed by Harold Thomas, the flag was flown in Victoria Square, Adelaide on National Aborigines Day, 12 July).
  - First Indigenous Australian theatre company formed: Nindethana Theatre in Melbourne. It was founded by Jack Charles and Bob Maza).
- 1972
  - First Indigenous Australian-produced community radio programs went to air (5UV in Adelaide and at the Townsville Aboriginal and Islander Media Association (TAIMA) at Mount Stuart, south of Townsville, on 4KIG FM2).
  - First Indigenous Australian representative Australian rules team to play overseas (Papua New Guinea).
  - First film made by an Indigenous Australian (Blackfire, by Bruce McGuinness and Martin Bartfeld).
  - First Indigenous Australian to receive a knighthood (Douglas Nicholls).
- 1973
  - First Indigenous Australian jockey to win the Melbourne Cup: Frank Reys.
  - First Indigenous Australian to captain Australia: Arthur Beetson (Rugby League).
  - First television show with an all-Aboriginal cast (Basically Black).
- 1974
  - First Indigenous Australian elected to a state or territory parliament: Hyacinth Tungutalum.
- 1975
  - First Indigenous Australian to be employed in Australia's tertiary education sector as a lecturer: Maryann Bin-Salik.
- 1976
  - First Indigenous Australian to hold vice-regal office (Governor of South Australia): Sir Douglas Nicholls.
  - First Indigenous Australian to be appointed a Justice of the Peace in South Australia: Ken Hampton (see also 1961).
  - First Indigenous Australian Barrister: Patricia O’Shane.
  - First Indigenous Australian woman to be awarded an Order of Australia: Lois (Lowitja) O’Donoghue
- 1977
  - First Indigenous Australian to hold a shadow portfolio in a federal, state or territory parliament: Neville Perkins (Northern Territory).
  - First Indigenous Australian to referee a world title boxing match: Trevor Christian.
  - First city council to fly the Aboriginal flag (Newcastle City Council).
- 1979
  - First Indigenous Australian to represent Australia in volleyball: Mark Tutton.
  - First woman to be appointed to the New South Wales Metropolitan Water, Sewerage and Drainage Board. Patricia O'Shane.
  - First Indigenous Principal in Western Australia after being promoted to Principal Class II of Wiluna Special Aboriginal School: Len Hayward

=== 1980s ===
- 1980
  - First Indigenous Australian to receive a PhD: Bill Jonas (from the University of Papua New Guinea)
  - First Indigenous Australian to officially address the United Nations: Jim Hagan.
- 1981
  - First boxer to become Australian titleholder in four weight divisions: Tony Mundine.
  - First feature film starring all-Indigenous Australian cast: Wrong Side of the Road.
  - First Aboriginal person and first woman to become a permanent head of ministry in Australia: Patricia O'Shane.
- 1982
  - First Indigenous Australian woman to gain a private pilot's licence: Virginia Wykes.
  - First Indigenous Australian man to play at Wimbledon: Ian Goolagong (mixed doubles with sister Evonne).
  - First Indigenous Australian to win the Norm Smith Medal: Maurice Rioli.
  - First Indigenous Australian to head a state government department (New South Wales Department of Aboriginal Affairs): Pat O'Shane.
- 1983
  - First Indigenous Australian to become a medical doctor: Dr Helen Milroy.
- 1984
  - First Indigenous Australian to become permanent head of a federal government department (Department of Aboriginal Affairs): Charles Perkins. (see also 1966)
- 1985
  - First Indigenous Australian television station commences: Channel 4 Yuendumu.
  - First Indigenous Australian bishop of the Anglican Church of Australia: Arthur Malcolm.
- 1986
  - First Indigenous Australian Minister of the Crown: Ernie Bridge (Western Australia).
  - First Indigenous Australian to represent Australia in netball: Marcia Ella-Duncan.
- 1987
  - First Indigenous Australian psychologist: Pat Dudgeon.
- 1989
  - First Indigenous Australian to win the Magarey Medal: Gilbert McAdam.
  - First Indigenous Australian to receive a PhD from an Australian university: Eve Fesl (Monash)

=== 1990s ===
- 1990
  - First Indigenous Australian to win an international track medal (bronze, 4 × 400 m relay, 1990 Commonwealth Games): Cathy Freeman (see also 2000).
  - First Indigenous Australian rock opera: Bran Nue Dae.
- 1991
  - First Indigenous Australian woman to represent Australia in hockey: Lorelle Morrissey.
- 1992
  - First Indigenous Australian to win an Olympic medal (bronze, 100m breaststroke): Samantha Riley.
  - The Torres Strait Islander flag is flown for the first time.
  - First Indigenous Australian to direct a feature film: Brian Syron (Jindalee Lady).
- 1993
  - First Indigenous Australian to win a Brownlow Medal: Gavin Wanganeen.
- 1994
  - First Indigenous Australian to be appointed a university Chancellor: Patricia O'Shane.
- 1995
  - First Indigenous Australian to graduate as a veterinary surgeon: Joe Schmidt.
- 1996
  - First Indigenous Australian to win a Gold Medal at the Olympic Games: Nova Peris (hockey).
  - First Indigenous Australian to play Test cricket: Jason Gillespie.
  - First Indigenous Australian male to represent Australia in hockey: Baeden Choppy.
  - First Indigenous Australian to be appointed a judge: Bob Bellear.
  - First Indigenous Australian woman to complete a Sydney to Hobart race. Kathy Collingridge, on the yacht One Time Sidewinder.
- 1997
  - First Indigenous performing arts centre: Aboriginal Centre for the Performing Arts (ACPA)
  - First Indigenous Australian elected to the International Rugby Hall of Fame: Mark Ella.
- 1999
  - First Indigenous Australian to become Miss Australia: Kathryn Hay.
- 2000
  - First Indigenous Australian to win an individual Olympic gold medal (400m, 2000 Summer Olympics): Cathy Freeman (see also 1990 and 1992).

== 21st century ==
=== 2000s ===
- 2001
  - First Indigenous Australian woman elected to an Australian parliament: Carol Martin.
- 2003
  - First Indigenous Australian woman Minister of the Crown: Marion Scrymgour.
  - First Indigenous nurse practitioner in Australia: Lesley Salem.
  - First Indigenous medical practitioner to be awarded a Doctorate of Philosophy: Sandra Eades.
  - First Indigenous Australian to earn a combined Masters/PhD in clinical psychology: Tracy Westerman.
- 2007
  - First Indigenous Australian surgeon: Kelvin Kong.
- 2008
  - First Indigenous Australian to play in the National Basketball Association (NBA): Nathan Jawai.
- 2009
  - First Indigenous Australian woman to become an Anglican remote area priest: Yulki Nunggumajbarr.

=== 2010s ===
- 2010
  - First Indigenous Australian woman elected to a United Nations body: Megan Davis (Permanent Forum on Indigenous Issues).
  - First Indigenous Australians to set foot on Antarctica: Narelle Long and Malcolm Lynch.
  - First Indigenous Australian to play international Twenty20 cricket: Dan Christian (Australia vs West Indies).
  - First Indigenous Australian elected to the Australian House of Representatives: Ken Wyatt.
- 2011
  - First Indigenous Australian Rhodes Scholar: Rebecca Richards.
- 2012
  - First Indigenous Australian woman archdeacon in the Anglican Church: Karen Kime.
  - First Indigenous Australian to join golf's PGA Tour: Scott Gardiner.
  - First Indigenous Australian to study at the University of Cambridge: Lilly Brown.
  - First Indigenous Australian appointed to a federal court: Matthew Myers.
- 2013
  - First Indigenous Australian to become a head of government: Adam Giles (Northern Territory).
  - First Indigenous Australian appointed as head of an overseas mission: Damien Miller (Denmark).
  - First time Aboriginal flag flown over an overseas military base (Al Minhad Air Base, United Arab Emirates).
  - First Indigenous Australian woman elected to Australian parliament: Nova Peris.
- 2015
  - First Indigenous Australian woman elected to the Queensland Parliament: Leeanne Enoch.
  - First Indigenous Australian to be appointed a federal frontbench minister: Ken Wyatt.
  - First Indigenous Australian to become a Queen's Counsel: Tony McAvoy.
  - First Indigenous Australian woman to be ordained to Christian ministry in South Australia: Denise Mary Champion
- 2016
  - First Indigenous Australian woman elected to Australian House of Representatives: Linda Burney.
  - First Indigenous Australian to win the X Factor: Isaiah Firebrace.
- 2017
  - First Indigenous Australian to be appointed a minister in the Commonwealth Government: Ken Wyatt (Minister for Indigenous Health).
- 2018
  - First Indigenous Australian to compete in a Winter Olympics: Harley Windsor (Figure skating).
- 2019
  - Twelve year old Indigenous Australian Dujuan Hoosan becomes the youngest person to address the UN Human Rights Council.

=== 2020s ===
- 2020
  - First Indigenous Australian to win AFLW Best and Fairest: Maddy Prespakis.
