= Patty Mills =

Australian basketball player (born 1988)

Patty Mills AM
- Mills with ASVEL in 2026

No. 8 – ASVEL
- Position: Point guard / shooting guard
- League: LNB Élite; EuroLeague

Personal information
- Born: 11 August 1988 (age 38) Canberra, ACT, Australia
- Listed height: 1.85 m (6 ft 1 in)
- Listed weight: 82 kg (181 lb)

Career information
- High school: Marist College (Canberra, Australia); Lake Ginninderra (Canberra, Australia)
- College: Saint Mary's (2007–2009)
- NBA draft: 2009: 2nd round, 55th overall pick
- Drafted by: Portland Trail Blazers
- Playing career: 2009–present

Career history
- 2009–2011: Portland Trail Blazers
- 2009–2010: →Idaho Stampede
- 2011: Melbourne Tigers
- 2011–2012: Xinjiang Flying Tigers
- 2012–2021: San Antonio Spurs
- 2021–2023: Brooklyn Nets
- 2023–2024: Atlanta Hawks
- 2024: Miami Heat
- 2024–2025: Utah Jazz
- 2025: Los Angeles Clippers
- 2026: La Laguna Tenerife
- 2026–present: ASVEL

Career highlights
- NBA champion (2014); The Don Award Winner (2021); 3× Gaze Medalist (2008, 2010, 2021); 2× First-team All-WCC (2008, 2009); WCC Newcomer of the Year (2008); WCC All-Freshman Team (2008); No. 13 retired by Saint Mary's Gaels
- Stats at NBA.com
- Stats at Basketball Reference
Medals
Men's basketball
Representing Australia
Olympic Games
| Bronze medal – third place | 2020 Tokyo | Team |
FIBA Oceania Championship
| Gold medal – first place | 2007 Australia |
| Gold medal – first place | 2011 Australia |
| Gold medal – first place | 2013 Australia |
| Gold medal – first place | 2015 Australia |

Patrick Sammie Mills AM (born 11 August 1988) is an Australian professional basketball player for ASVEL of the French LNB Élite and the EuroLeague. He is the general manager of the Hawaii Rainbow Warriors basketball program at the University of Hawai'i at Mānoa. Mills was born and raised in Canberra, and is of Torres Strait Islander and Aboriginal Australian (Kokatha and Dauareb-Meriam) descent. In 2007, he became the third Indigenous basketball player to play for the Australian National Team. Mills was selected by the Portland Trail Blazers with the 55th overall pick in the 2009 NBA draft after playing two years of college basketball for the Saint Mary's Gaels.

Mills played for the Portland Trail Blazers for two seasons. In 2011, during the NBA lockout, he played for the Melbourne Tigers of the National Basketball League (NBL) and for the Xinjiang Flying Tigers in China. Mills returned to the United States in March 2012 and signed with the San Antonio Spurs. He became a strong contributor off the bench and helped the Spurs win the 2014 NBA championship. In 2021 he led the Australian Boomers to their first-ever Olympic medal at the Tokyo 2020 Olympics. While with the Boomers, he is often referred to as "FIBA Patty" for his high level performances in the Olympics where he is the 5th highest scorer in Olympic basketball history. Mills is well known for his three-point shooting and his leadership qualities.

== Early life and family ==
Mills was born in the Australian capital city of Canberra. Mills' father, Benny, is a Torres Strait Islander (Muralag) and his mother, Yvonne, is Aboriginal Australian (Kokatha), the daughter of a white man and an Aboriginal woman. As part of the Stolen Generations, she and her four siblings were taken from their parents by the Australian state after her parents' separation in 1949. Mills has said that learning of his mother's past was a "turning point" in his understanding of his identity as Indigenous Australian.

Mills' uncle is former Olympian basketballer Danny Morseu, the second Indigenous Australian to represent Australia at the Olympics in basketball; Mills would be the third, thirty years later. He is the cousin of rugby league player Edrick Lee, and fellow basketball player Nathan Jawai. Mills' great-uncle is Indigenous land rights activist Eddie Mabo.

== Early basketball career ==
Mills first took up basketball as a four-year-old for a local Indigenous club his parents established called "The Shadows". Growing up, he was the ball boy for the Canberra Cannons of the National Basketball League (NBL). Mills' future coach at Saint Mary's College of California, David Patrick, played for the Cannons during that time and developed a relationship with the Mills family.

In addition to playing basketball, Mills also played underage Australian rules football at a high level. He had an opportunity to pursue a career in the Australian Football League (AFL), but decided to concentrate on basketball instead. In 2005, he made a strong impression at the Australian Olympic Youth Festival, an event considered to be a showcase for future elite sporting talents.

Mills initially attended Canberra's Marist College, going on to attend the Australian Institute of Sport between 2005 and 2007 as well as Lake Ginninderra College.

In January 2006, Mills was almost awarded the prestigious RE Staunton Medal at the U20 Nationals in Perth. As a member of the 2006 Junior National Men's Team, Mills helped Australia defeat New Zealand and qualify for the 2007 Junior Men's World Championships. In April, Mills was a member of the World Junior Select Team that competed against the United States in the Nike Hoop Summit. With the AIS men's team in the South East Australian Basketball League (SEABL), Mills was named the 2006 U/21 Australian Youth Player of the Year, averaging 18.1 points and 3.9 rebounds per game and helping the AIS to a 16–10 regular season record. He finished the SEABL season third in assists, averaging 4.37 per game.

Also in 2006, Mills was the youngest athlete selected in the 22-man extended Australian Boomers squad ahead of the 2006 FIBA World Championship. In July, he was named the 2006 Junior Male Player of the Year at Basketball Australia's annual Junior Basketball Awards. Mills was named the "most promising new sports talent" at the 2006 Deadlys Awards. The Deadlys Awards honor Aboriginal and Torres Strait Islanders achievements in sports, music, entertainment and community. In addition to receiving the Deadlys Award, Mills was named the 2006 Australia Basketball Player of the Year and the National Sportsperson of the Year by the NAIDOC.

== College career ==
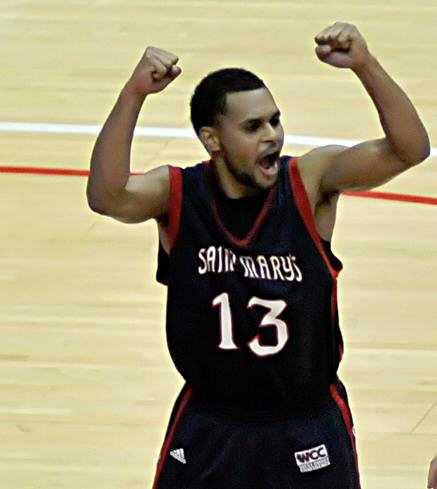
Mills in December 2008, during his sophomore season

In November 2006, Mills signed to play college basketball for Saint Mary's College of California beginning in the 2007–08 season. He joined fellow Australians Lucas Walker and Carlin Hughes on the Gaels for the 2007–08 season.

Mills was named the West Coast Conference (WCC) Newcomer of the Year and earned All-WCC First Team honours after helping the Gaels earn a top-25 ranking for the first time since the 1988–89 season. He started all 32 games for the Gaels as a freshman, posting a team-high 14.8 points, 2.1 rebounds, 3.5 assists and 1.8 steals in 32.1 minutes. He set a Saint Mary's freshman record for points in a season with 472, and set the school freshman mark for points in a game with a 37-point performance against Oregon on 20 November 2007. He was also a three-time WCC Player of the Week honouree (16 November, 24 December and 19 February).

As a sophomore in 2008–09, Mills averaged 18.4 points, 3.9 assists, 2.4 rebounds and 2.2 steals in 32.1 minutes and was named WCC Player of the Week twice (24 November and 8 December). He was subsequently named All-WCC First Team for a second straight year.

In April 2009, Mills declared for the NBA draft, forgoing his final two years of college eligibility.

== Professional career ==
=== Portland Trail Blazers (2009–2011) ===
On 25 June 2009, Mills was selected with the 55th overall pick by the Portland Trail Blazers, becoming the first Saint Mary's player since 1983 to be drafted, and was the highest pick since 1961.

On 9 July 2009, Mills fractured the fifth metatarsal in his right foot during practice and was subsequently ruled out of the NBA Summer League. On 16 October 2009, he signed a contract with the Trail Blazers. After completing rehabilitation, Mills was assigned to the Idaho Stampede of the NBA Development League on 29 December 2009.

On 4 January 2010, Mills was called up to the NBA by the Trail Blazers. Mills made his NBA debut that night. He was reassigned to the Stampede on 13 January before being recalled again on 23 January. Mills appeared in 10 games with the Trail Blazers during his rookie season, averaging 2.6 points in 3.8 minutes. He scored a season-high 11 points in Portland's regular-season finale on 14 April against the Golden State Warriors. He also appeared in three playoff games for the Trail Blazers.

In 2010–11, Mills played in 64 games for the Trail Blazers, averaging 5.5 points and 1.7 assists in 12.2 minutes. He scored in double figures 10 times and posted what was a career-best 23 points in Portland's regular-season finale on 13 April against Golden State. He also appeared in two playoff games for the Trail Blazers.

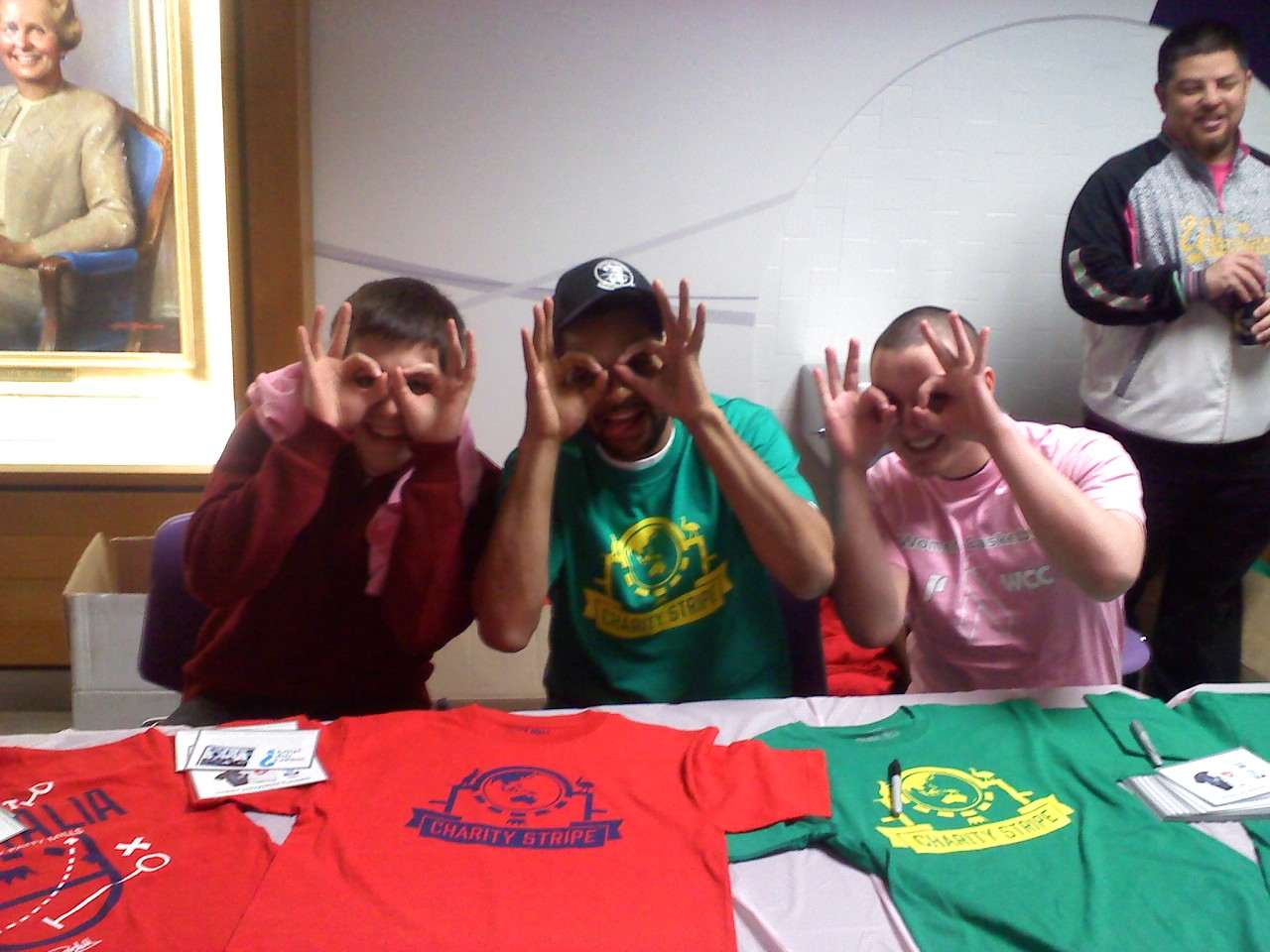
Mills (center) strikes a "3 Goggles" pose with two fans in 2011.

=== Melbourne Tigers (2011) ===
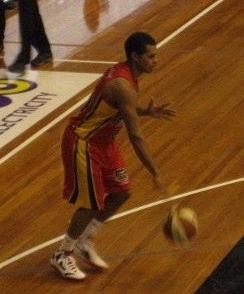
Mills during his stint with the Melbourne Tigers

Due to the 2011 NBA lockout, Mills returned to Australia to play in the National Basketball League (NBL). On 29 August 2011, he signed with the Melbourne Tigers, reportedly turning down lucrative offers from a number of European teams. In the Tigers' season opener on 7 October 2011, Mills scored a game-high 28 points in an 82–76 win over the Sydney Kings.

=== Xinjiang Flying Tigers (2011–2012) ===
Mills was released by the Tigers on 20 November after receiving an offer of about $1 million from a Chinese team, the Xinjiang Flying Tigers. In nine games for Melbourne, he averaged 18.6 points, 2.3 rebounds and 5.0 assists per game.

On 4 January 2012, Mills was released by Xinjiang after being out for 10 days with a hamstring injury. With the NBA lockout ending on 8 December 2011, Mills wanted to return to the Portland Trail Blazers, but the Chinese Basketball Association could not guarantee that he would receive FIBA clearance until March. Reports later surfaced that Mills was sacked by Xinjiang for allegedly faking the hamstring injury; Mills denied the allegation that his hamstring injury was faked. In 12 games for Xinjiang, he averaged 26.5 points per game.

=== San Antonio Spurs (2012–2021) ===
On 27 March 2012, Mills signed with the San Antonio Spurs. On 26 April 2012, Mills set career highs with 34 points and 12 assists for his first NBA double-double in a 107–101 win over the Golden State Warriors. Mills posted the highest single-game score by an Australian in the NBA, surpassing Andrew Bogut's 32 points in January 2010.

On 13 July 2012, Mills re-signed with the Spurs. In the Spurs' second-last game of the regular season on 15 April 2013, Mills scored a season-high 23 points in a 116–106 loss to Golden State. The Spurs went on to reach the 2013 NBA Finals, where they lost in seven games to the Miami Heat. Mills missed the final four games of the NBA Finals with an abscess removal on his right foot.

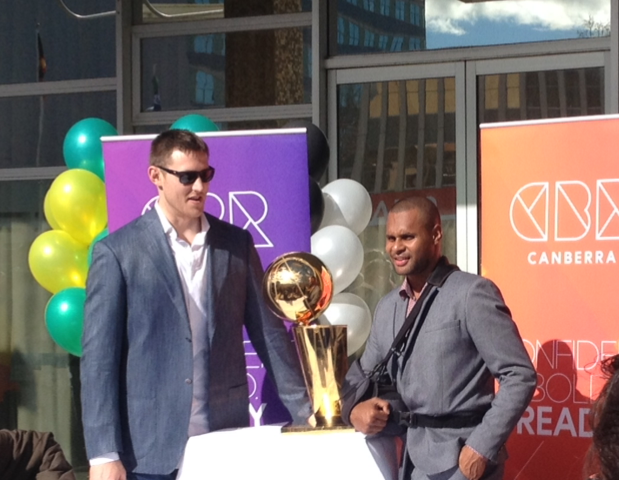
Mills (right) and teammate Aron Baynes in July 2014, with the Larry O'Brien Championship Trophy

On 24 June 2013, Mills exercised his player option to return to the Spurs for the 2013–14 season. During the offseason, Mills lost weight and lowered his body fat. Mills appeared in a team-high 81 games, including two starts, averaging 10.2 points, 2.1 rebounds and 1.8 assists in a career-high 18.9 minutes. He logged 1,527 minutes in 2013–14 after totaling 1,737 minutes in his previous four seasons combined. Mills helped the Spurs return to the NBA Finals in 2014, where they again faced the Miami Heat. In game 5 of the NBA Finals, Mills scored 14 of his 17 points in the third quarter to help lift the Spurs to a 104–87 series-clinching win.

On 11 July 2014, the Spurs signed Mills to a three-year, $12 million contract. He missed the first 31 games of the 2014–15 season with a shoulder injury.

On 25 April 2017, Mills scored a postseason-high 20 points on 5-for-7 shooting in a 116–103 win over the Memphis Grizzlies in game 5 of their first-round series.

On 4 August 2017, Mills re-signed with the Spurs on a four-year, $50 million contract. On 4 December 2017, in a 96–93 win over the Detroit Pistons, Mills became the third Spur to have made 500 three-pointers as a reserve; the others are Manu Ginóbili and Matt Bonner. On 18 December 2017, in a 109–91 win over the Los Angeles Clippers, Mills became one of only three Spurs in franchise history to have scored 3,000 career points as a reserve; the others are Ginóbili and Malik Rose. On 25 February 2018 against the Cleveland Cavaliers, Mills climbed into fourth place on the Spurs' list of all-time three-pointers made.

In March 2019, Mills became the only Spurs player to make more than 120 three-pointers in five different seasons.

On 19 January 2020, Mills made his 1,000th NBA three-pointer. He is the first Australian player in NBA history to reach that milestone.

On 29 December 2020, he became the tenth player in Spurs history to play in 600 games with the team. As of December 2020, Mills is the Spurs' longest-tenured player and is the only player remaining on the roster who was a member of the Spurs' NBA championship-winning team in 2014. Also as of December 2020, only two NBA players—Udonis Haslem of the Miami Heat and Stephen Curry of the Golden State Warriors—had been with their respective teams longer than Mills had been with the Spurs.

On 18 January 2021, Mills set an NBA record for most three-point shots made for one team as a reserve. On 14 March, Mills overtook Andrew Bogut's record for most NBA games played by an Australian by playing his 706th game.

=== Brooklyn Nets (2021–2023) ===
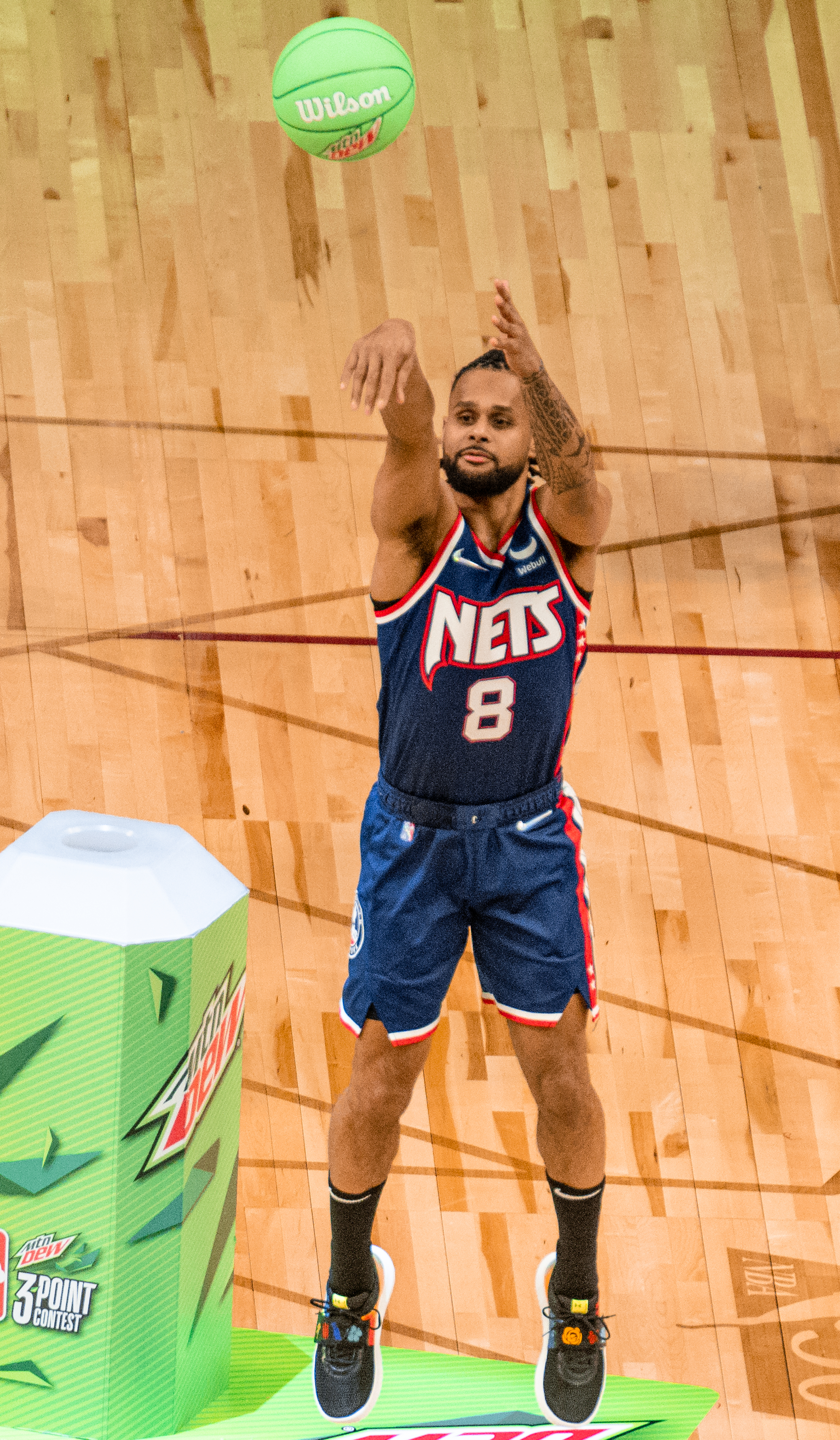
Mills in the Three Point Contest during 2022 NBA All-Star Weekend

On 10 August 2021, Mills signed with the Brooklyn Nets. On 19 October, Mills made his Nets debut, scoring 21 points on 7-of-7 shooting from deep in a 127–104 loss to the Milwaukee Bucks. In his debut, Mills tied the league record for most threes made in a debut with a new team. On 22 October, Mills became the first player to shoot a perfect 10-of-10 from the three-point line in the first two games of the season. On 14 November, Mills scored 29 points on a career-high nine three-pointers in a 120–96 win over the Oklahoma City Thunder.

On 22 November, Mills scored 17 points against the Cavaliers to overtake Andrew Bogut's NBA record of most points scored by an Australian. On 14 December, in a 131–129 overtime win over the Toronto Raptors, Mills played a career-high 43 minutes and had a then season-high 30 points on 7-of-14 from three including the game-tying three that sent the game to overtime. On the NBA Christmas game, Mills tied his career high with 34 points on 8-for-13 from three in a 122–115 win over the Los Angeles Lakers. His eight three-pointers made broke the record for the most three-pointers made on Christmas Day.

On 10 July 2022, Mills re-signed with the Nets on a two-year, $14.5 million contract.

=== Atlanta Hawks (2023–2024) ===
On 6 July 2023, Mills, plus a 2028 second-round draft pick, was traded by the Nets to the Houston Rockets in exchange for future draft considerations. On 8 July, the Rockets sent him to the Oklahoma City Thunder as part of a five-team trade, and four days later, he was traded for a third time in the off-season, this time to the Atlanta Hawks, in exchange for TyTy Washington Jr., Usman Garuba, Rudy Gay and a 2026 second-round pick.

On 29 February 2024, the Hawks waived Mills.

=== Miami Heat (2024) ===
On 6 March 2024, Mills signed with the Miami Heat.

=== Utah Jazz (2024–2025) ===
On 5 September 2024, Mills signed with the Utah Jazz.

=== Los Angeles Clippers (2025) ===
On 1 February 2025, Mills was traded to the Los Angeles Clippers alongside Drew Eubanks in exchange for Mo Bamba, P. J. Tucker, a 2030 second-round pick and cash considerations. This move would reunite him with Kawhi Leonard who last played with Mills on the San Antonio Spurs during the 2017–18 NBA season as well as Ben Simmons, who played with him during the 2022-23 NBA season on the Brooklyn Nets.

=== La Laguna Tenerife (2026) ===
On 8 March 2026, Mills signed for La Laguna Tenerife of the Liga ACB and the Basketball Champions League (BCL). He made his debut for the team on 17 March, in Trieste, in an 82–76 loss against Pallacanestro Trieste, finishing with nine points in 16 minutes.

=== ASVEL (2026–present) ===
On 10 August 2026, Mills signed a one-year contract with LDLC ASVEL of the French LNB Élite and the EuroLeague.

== Executive career ==
On 10 June 2025, Mills was hired as the general manager for the University of Hawaii of the National Collegiate Athletic Association (NCAA).

== National team career ==
In 2007, Mills made his senior national team debut for the Boomers at the FIBA Oceania Championship. Mills became the third Indigenous basketball player to play for Australia behind Olympians Michael Ah Matt (1964) and Danny Morseu (1980–84). The following year, he played for Australia at the FIBA Diamond Ball tournament and represented his country at the Beijing Olympics, where he averaged 14.2 points per game. Mills went on to play for Australia at the 2010 FIBA World Championship and 2011 FIBA Oceania Championship, before once again representing his country at the 2012 London Olympics. At the 2012 Olympics, Mills had the highest scoring average with 21.2 points per game, ahead of Kevin Durant of the United States, who averaged 19.5 points per game.

In 2013, Mills played for Australia at the FIBA Oceania Championship. Two years later, he played at the 2015 FIBA Oceania Championship. In 2016, he helped the Boomers finish fourth at the 2016 Rio Olympics.

Mills became the first Indigenous Australian to be a flag bearer when he carried the Australian flag alongside swimmer Cate Campbell at the opening ceremony for the 2020 Tokyo Olympics. As captain, Mills helped lead Australia to obtain their first ever Olympic medal in men's basketball by scoring 42 points against Slovenia in the bronze medal game. His 42 points are an Olympic record for points scored in a medal round game. His performance also earned him honours as the shooting guard in the Tokyo 2020 All Star Five for the men's Olympics basketball tournament.

Mills represented Australia once again in the 2024 Paris Olympics. In the third group game, he scored 13 points against Greece, which moved him to fifth place on the all-time scoring list at the Olympics, surpassing Wlamir Marques. He finished the tournament as Australia's second-leading scorer just behind Josh Giddey, scoring 66 points to bring his career total to 567.

== Player profile ==
Mills is known for his three-point shooting, his commitment to the team culture of the San Antonio Spurs and the Boomers, his enthusiasm, and his leadership qualities.

During the 2010–11 season, the "3 Goggles" trend became popular in the NBA, whereby players fit themselves with "A-OK" hand-gesture goggles after they make a three-point basket during a game. Mills and teammate Rudy Fernández are credited with having started the trend. Mills and his teammates would poke fun at Fernández's struggles from beyond the three-point line, indicating he could not see very well. So yes when Fernández started sinking three-point shots, they would make goggles with their hands over their eyes in tribute to his skill. From Fernández's perspective, when he started to make three-point shots, he would make the goggle gesture to show Mills his vision was OK. T-shirts with the gesture were printed and popularly sold in Portland.

== Career statistics ==
Legend
| GP | Games played | GS | Games started | MPG | Minutes per game |
| FG% | Field goal percentage | 3P% | 3-point field goal percentage | FT% | Free throw percentage |
| RPG | Rebounds per game | APG | Assists per game | SPG | Steals per game |
| BPG | Blocks per game | PPG | Points per game | **Bold** | Career high |
| † | Won an NBA championship | * | Led the league |

=== NBA ===
==== Regular season ====
| Year | Team | GP | GS | MPG | FG% | 3P% | FT% | RPG | APG | SPG | BPG | PPG |
|---|---|---|---|---|---|---|---|---|---|---|---|---|
| 2009–10 | Portland | 10 | 0 | 3.8 | .417 | **.500** | .571 | .2 | .5 | .0 | .0 | 2.6 |
| 2010–11 | Portland | 64 | 0 | 12.2 | .412 | .353 | .766 | .8 | 1.7 | .4 | .0 | 5.5 |
| 2011–12 | San Antonio | 16 | 3 | 16.3 | .485 | .429 | **1.000** | 1.8 | 2.4 | .6 | .1 | 10.3 |
| 2012–13 | San Antonio | 58 | 2 | 11.3 | .469 | .400 | .842 | .9 | 1.1 | .4 | .1 | 5.1 |
| 2013–14† | San Antonio | 81 | 2 | 18.9 | .464 | .425 | .890 | 2.1 | 1.8 | **.8** | .1 | 10.2 |
| 2014–15 | San Antonio | 51 | 0 | 15.7 | .381 | .341 | .825 | 1.5 | 1.7 | .5 | .0 | 6.9 |
| 2015–16 | San Antonio | 81 | 3 | 20.5 | .425 | .384 | .810 | 2.0 | 2.8 | .7 | .1 | 8.5 |
| 2016–17 | San Antonio | 80 | 8 | 21.9 | .439 | .413 | .825 | 1.8 | **3.5** | **.8** | .0 | 9.5 |
| 2017–18 | San Antonio | **82*** | 36 | 25.7 | .411 | .372 | .890 | 1.9 | 2.8 | .7 | .1 | 10.0 |
| 2018–19 | San Antonio | **82*** | 1 | 23.3 | .425 | .394 | .854 | **2.2** | 3.0 | .6 | .1 | 9.9 |
| 2019–20 | San Antonio | 66 | 1 | 22.5 | .431 | .382 | .866 | 1.6 | 1.8 | **.8** | .1 | **11.6** |
| 2020–21 | San Antonio | 68 | 1 | 24.8 | .412 | .375 | .910 | 1.7 | 2.4 | .6 | .0 | 10.8 |
| 2021–22 | Brooklyn | 81 | **48** | **29.0** | .408 | .400 | .814 | 1.9 | 2.3 | .6 | **.2** | 11.4 |
| 2022–23 | Brooklyn | 40 | 2 | 14.2 | .411 | .366 | .833 | 1.1 | 1.4 | .4 | .1 | 6.2 |
| 2023–24 | Atlanta | 19 | 0 | 10.6 | .373 | .382 | — | 1.1 | .7 | .5 | .1 | 2.7 |
| 2023–24 | Miami | 13 | 5 | 16.4 | .338 | .208 | **1.000** | 1.2 | 1.5 | **.8** | .0 | 5.8 |
| 2024–25 | Utah | 17 | 0 | 15.3 | .342 | .298 | **1.000** | 1.2 | 1.2 | .7 | **.2** | 4.4 |
| 2024–25 | L.A. Clippers | 12 | 0 | 5.1 | **.500** | **.500** | .889 | .1 | .4 | .1 | .0 | 3.1 |
| Career | | 921 | 112 | 19.9 | .423 | .385 | .857 | 1.6 | 2.2 | .6 | .1 | 8.7 |

==== Playoffs ====
| Year | Team | GP | GS | MPG | FG% | 3P% | FT% | RPG | APG | SPG | BPG | PPG |
|---|---|---|---|---|---|---|---|---|---|---|---|---|
| 2010 | Portland | 3 | 0 | 4.1 | .500 | **1.000** | **1.000** | .0 | 1.0 | .0 | .0 | 2.0 |
| 2011 | Portland | 2 | 0 | 2.6 | .000 | .000 | — | .5 | .0 | .0 | .0 | .0 |
| 2012 | San Antonio | 8 | 0 | 3.9 | .545 | .600 | — | .4 | .6 | .1 | .0 | 1.9 |
| 2013 | San Antonio | 9 | 0 | 3.4 | .500 | .286 | — | .3 | .2 | .0 | .0 | 1.3 |
| 2014† | San Antonio | **23** | 0 | 15.2 | .447 | .405 | .769 | 1.5 | 1.4 | .7 | .0 | 7.3 |
| 2015 | San Antonio | 7 | 0 | 16.0 | .500 | .571 | **1.000** | **2.7** | 1.1 | .3 | .0 | 10.1 |
| 2016 | San Antonio | 10 | 0 | 16.7 | .434 | .361 | .636 | 1.4 | 2.0 | .7 | .0 | 6.6 |
| 2017 | San Antonio | 16 | **6** | 26.0 | .407 | .360 | .864 | 2.1 | 2.7 | .8 | .1 | 10.3 |
| 2018 | San Antonio | 5 | 5 | **33.0** | .439 | .371 | .800 | 2.0 | 2.6 | .6 | **.2** | **13.4** |
| 2019 | San Antonio | 7 | 0 | 21.8 | .326 | .136 | .600 | 2.1 | **3.6** | **1.0** | .1 | 5.3 |
| 2022 | Brooklyn | 4 | 0 | 18.1 | **.563** | .538 | — | 1.0 | .0 | .0 | .3 | 6.3 |
| 2023 | Brooklyn | 1 | 0 | 5.3 | .000 | .000 | — | .0 | .0 | .0 | .0 | .0 |
| 2024 | Miami | 3 | 0 | 17.2 | .353 | .273 | .750 | .3 | 1.0 | .3 | .0 | 6.0 |
| 2025 | L.A. Clippers | 1 | 0 | 3.7 | .500 | **1.000** | — | .0 | .0 | .0 | .0 | 3.0 |
| Career | | 99 | 11 | 15.9 | .430 | .382 | .797 | 1.4 | 1.6 | .5 | .1 | 6.6 |

=== NBL ===
| Year | Team | GP | GS | MPG | FG% | 3P% | FT% | RPG | APG | SPG | BPG | PPG |
|---|---|---|---|---|---|---|---|---|---|---|---|---|
| 2011–12 | Melbourne | 9 | 5 | 33.9 | .421 | .348 | .806 | 2.3 | 5.0 | .8 | .1 | 18.6 |

=== CBA ===
==== Regular season ====
| Year | Team | GP | GS | MPG | FG% | 3P% | FT% | RPG | APG | SPG | BPG | PPG |
|---|---|---|---|---|---|---|---|---|---|---|---|---|
| 2011–12 | Xinjiang | 12 | 9 | 35.0 | .530 | .494 | .739 | 3.8 | 3.8 | 2.2 | .1 | 26.5 |

=== College ===
| Year | Team | GP | GS | MPG | FG% | 3P% | FT% | RPG | APG | SPG | BPG | PPG |
|---|---|---|---|---|---|---|---|---|---|---|---|---|
| 2007–08 | Saint Mary's | **32** | **32** | 32.1 | **.429** | .323 | .761 | 2.1 | 3.5 | 1.8 | .1 | 14.8 |
| 2008–09 | Saint Mary's | 26 | 23 | **33.3** | .402 | **.338** | **.859** | **2.4** | **3.9** | **2.2** | **.2** | **18.4** |
| Career | | 58 | 55 | 32.7 | .415 | .331 | .806 | 2.2 | 3.7 | 2.0 | .2 | 16.4 |

== Personal life ==
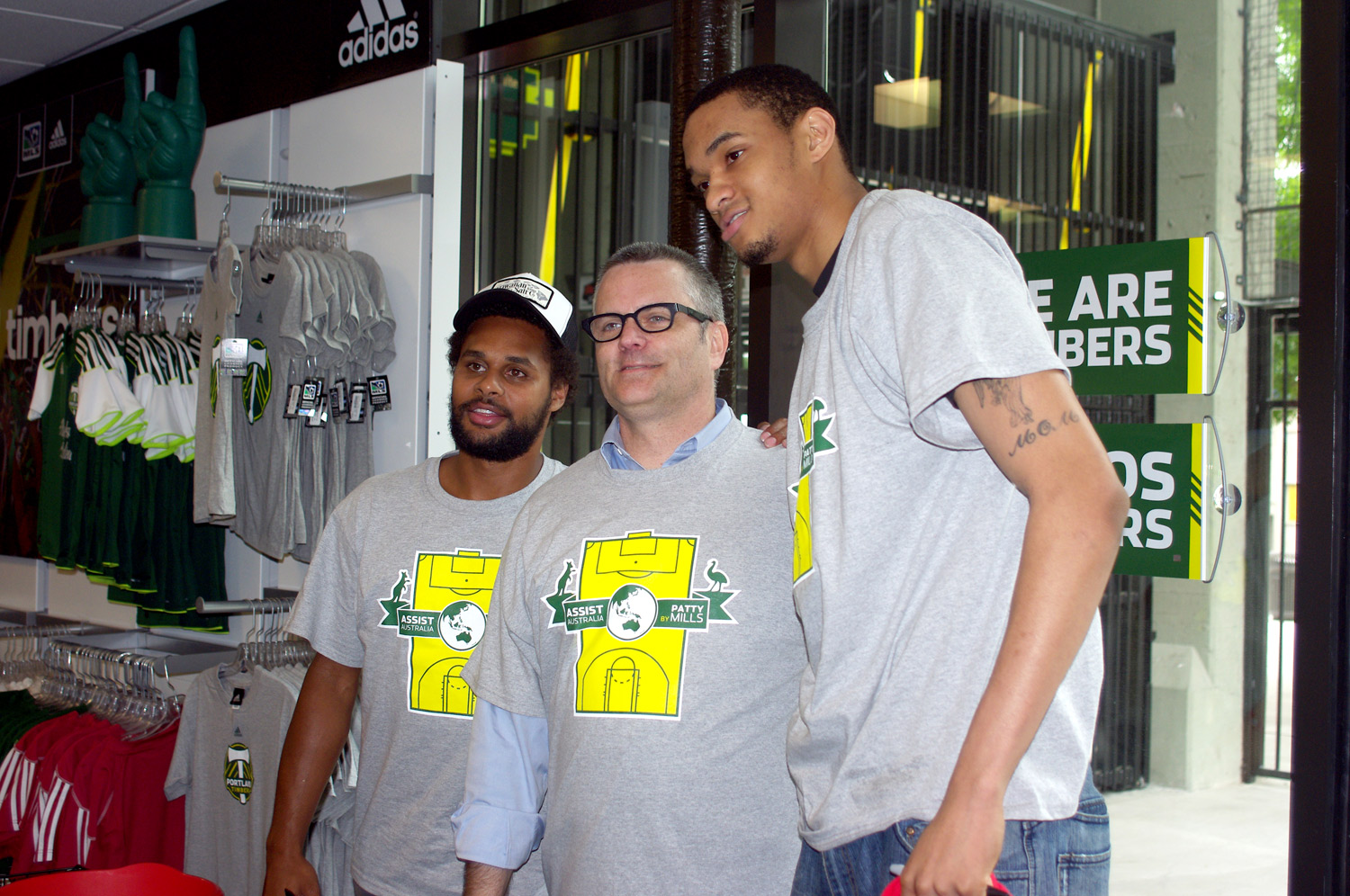
Mills (left) with then-teammate Chris Johnson and Portland, Oregon mayor Sam Adams in June 2011, wearing "Assist Australia" t-shirts

Mills met Alyssa Mills (née Levesque), who was also a college basketball player, while they were both attending Saint Mary's College of California. On 8 July 2019, they were married in Waimea Valley, Hawaii.

In July 2014, Mills was presented with the keys to the city in Canberra in the wake of the Spurs' championship success.

In 2017, Mills co-wrote a series of books for young readers with Jared Thomas, published in 2018 as Game Day! Championship Collection.

Mills is an ardent rugby league fan, supporting the Brisbane Broncos in the National Rugby League, as well as the Queensland Maroons in the annual State of Origin series. He is also a supporter of the Adelaide Crows in the Australian Football League.

== Activism ==
In 2011, Mills started the charity project "Assist Australia" following Queensland's floods in March 2010 and in December 2010 to January 2011. His first charity work came in 2010, helping raise over $40,000 for the first flood relief.

Mills has used his platform and resources to fight racism and police brutality, especially in his home country of Australia. In 2020, Mills helped launch "We Got You", a campaign to show support for athletes as they fight racism in Australian sport. He also donated his entire 2020 restart bubble salary of about $1.02 million to Black Lives Matter Australia and organizations addressing Black Deaths in Custody.

== Recognition ==
- 2021 – Sport Australia Hall of Fame 'Don Award'
- 2021 – CBR Sports Awards – Men's Sport Athlete of the Year
- 2022 – ACT Representative for Australian of the Year
- 2022 – Appointed as a Member of the Order of Australia (AM) in the 2022 Australia Day Honours for "significant service to basketball, to charitable initiatives to the Indigenous community"

== See also ==
- List of NBA career 3-point scoring leaders

Olympic Games
| Preceded by Anna Meares | Flagbearer for Australia (with Cate Campbell); Tokyo 2020 | Succeeded by Eddie Ockenden (with Jessica Fox) |
