= Phillipa McDermott =

Aboriginal Australian businesswoman

- Occupation: Director of First Nations Talent
- Employers: Australian Broadcasting Corporation (2013–2022); Bangarra Dance Theatre (2019–present); Deloitte Australia (2022–present)
- Relatives: Lloyd McDermott - Father

Phillipa McDermott is an Aboriginal Australian businesswoman and current chair of Bangarra Dance Theatre. She is known for her work in public media and various public positions.

== Early and personal life ==
Phillipa McDermott is the daughter of Lloyd McDermott. She is a member of the Yugambeh people.

== Career ==
McDermott is the current chair of Bangarra Dance Theatre which she has held since 2019, and worked closely with former artistic director, Stephen Page, overseeing his retirement and replacement. McDermott has been the Director of First Nations Talent for Deloitte Australia since July, 2022, formerly serving as the Head of Indigenous Employment at Australian Broadcasting Corporation since 2013. At the ABC she oversaw the increased use of Indigenous languages, names and Acknowledgements of Country across television, radio and online. McDermott was a member of the Australian Financial Review's panel that determined its 2022 Power list.

== Honours ==
In 2020, McDermott received the Indigenous Alumni Award from her alma mater, the University of Technology Sydney.
