= Margaret Williams-Weir =

Margaret Williams-Weir (c.1940 - 1 October 2015) was an Australian educator, researcher and Royal Canadian Naval officer. Williams-Weir was the first Aboriginal person to matriculate to an Australian University (shared with Geoffrey Penny), attend an Australian University and graduate from an Australian University.

Williams-Weir was a descendant of the Gumbaynggirr and Malera of the Bundjalung people of northern New South Wales.

== Education ==
Williams-Weir graduated from Casino High School in 1956 on a 50 pounds Aboriginal Welfare Board Scholarship. After being offered a scholarship by the University of Queensland, she enrolled in a Bachelor of Arts in 1957. After a semester, she took up an Abschol Award to study at the University of Melbourne, where she completed in a Diploma of Physical Education in 1959, becoming the first Indigenous Australian with a university qualification. She was offered a scholarship to live at the University Women's College while completing her studies from 1958 to 1959.

Williams-Weir went on to complete a Bachelor of Education, a research master's degree (with Honours) and a Doctor of Philosophy, with her thesis entitled Indigenous Australians and Universities: A Study of Postgraduate Students' Experiences in Learning Research at the University of New England in 2001.

== Naval service ==
Williams-Weir was a member of the Royal Canadian Navy from 1966 to 1969.
