= Lynch Cooper =

Australian sprinter

- Born: c. 1905; Moira Lake near Tocumwal, New South Wales
- Died: 30 July 1971 (aged 65–66); Wangaratta, Victoria
- Resting place: Wangarattta Cemetery
- Spouse: Eva Christian (1910-1988)
- Parent(s): William Cooper and Agnes nee Hamilton
- Relatives: Douglas Nicholls (cousin)

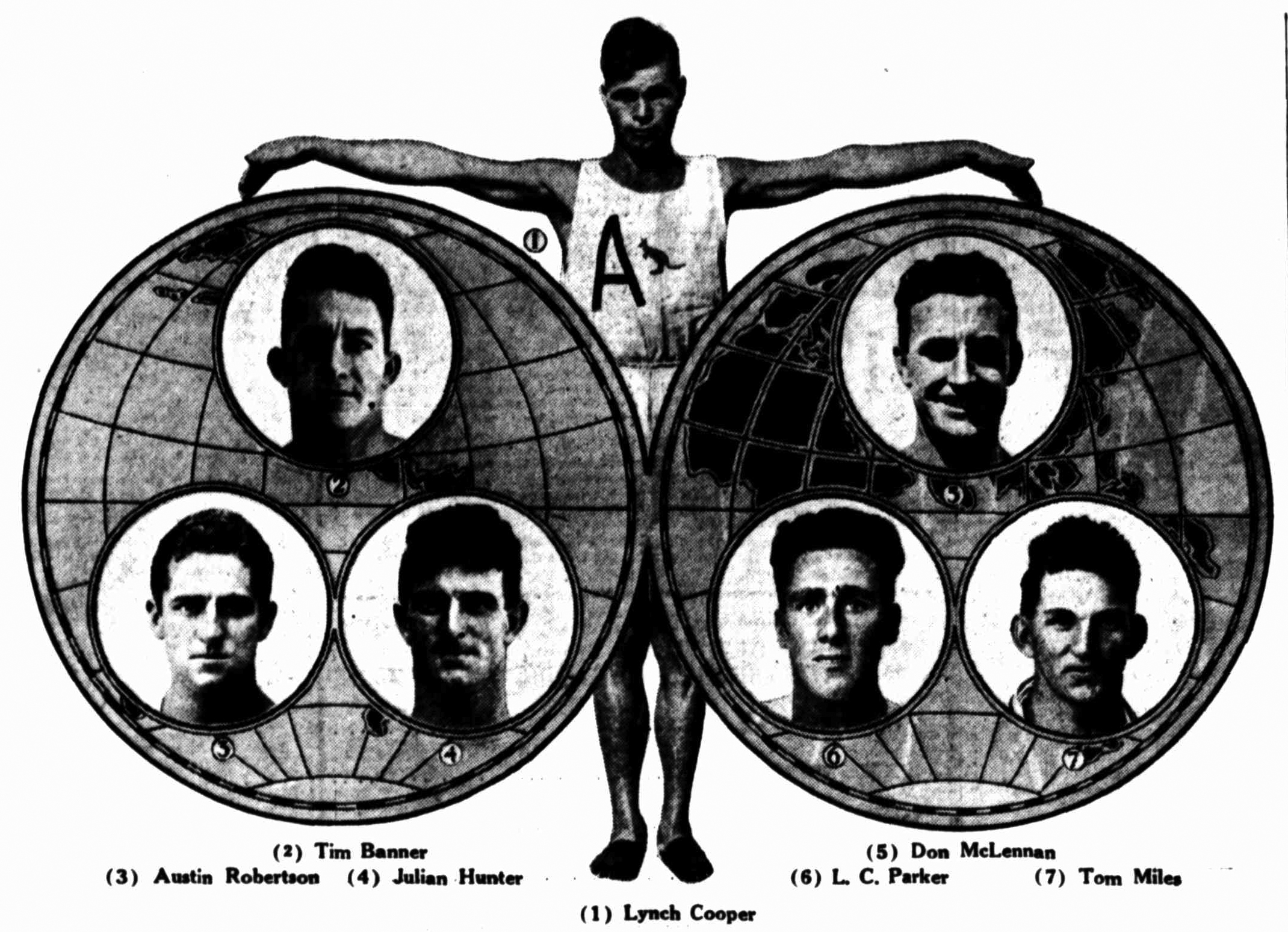
1930 Lynch Cooper and his challengers as world professional sprinter

Lynch Cooper (c. 1905–1971) was an Aboriginal Australian sprinter who won the Stawell Gift in 1928 and the world's professional sprint championship competition in 1929.

== Sport ==
Cooper, a Yorta Yorta man, who was a gifted runner from an early age, where he won many local and interstate races prior to winning the Stawell Gift in 1928 on his third attempt. Lynch won many gift races across Victoria and interstate.

In the mid 1920's Cooper played football for both Nhill and Jeparit Football Clubs and later played in Wangaratta's 1933 Ovens & Murray Football League premiership.

Cooper also played with Brighton in the Victorian Football Association in 1935.

Cooper was later an original inductee into the Aboriginal and Islander Sports Hall of Fame.

He later become prominent in Aboriginal activism including as president of the Aboriginal Progressive Association in the 1940s.

== Family ==
Cooper was born at Moira Lake near Tocumwal and was educated at Mulwala State School. His father was Aboriginal activist and community leader William Cooper.

Lynch Cooper married Eva Christian, daughter of Alfred William Christian and Annie Laid née Bruce, of Jeparit on 11 February 1939 at the Methodist Church, Footscray, Victoria.

== Links ==
- 1929 - Stawell Gift winner: Lynch Cooper photo
- 1933 - Wangaratta FC & Border United FC team photos
- 1934 - Wangaratta FC & Rutherglen FC team photos
