= Maitland Madge =

Australian Army soldier (1894–1944)

- Born: March 1894; Cooktown, Australia
- Died: 7 June 1944 (aged 50); Changi Prison, Singapore
- Burial place: Kranji War Cemetery
- Military career
- Allegiance: Australia
- Branch: Australian Army
- Service years: 1915–1919; 1940–1944
- Rank: Private
- Units: 15th Battalion (1915–19); 2/26th Battalion (1940–44)
- Conflicts: First World War; Second World War
- Awards: Military Medal

Maitland Madge, MM (March 1894 – 7 June 1944) is believed to be the first Indigenous Australian to be awarded the Military Medal in the First World War. Madge also served as a soldier during the Second World War. In 1941 he was captured by Japanese forces in Singapore. Madge was held as a prisoner of war at Changi Prison until his death in 1944.

== Early life ==
Maitland Madge was born in March 1894 in Cooktown, on the Cape York Peninsula of Queensland, to Ella, an Indigenous woman, and Richard Madge, an immigrant from Devon, England.

In 1905, possibly to prevent his son from being taken away to a government mission, Richard Madge applied for Maitland to be exempted from the Aboriginals Protection Act of 1897. Madge senior registered Maitland's birth and enrolled him at Kelvin Grove Boys School. The 1905 Annual Report of Queensland Chief Protector of Aboriginals reports Maitland Madge was granted an exemption from the Protection Act at the age of ten.

== First World War ==
Madge volunteered in Brisbane in August 1915, his address is recorded on the embarkation roll as Harcourt Street, Teneriffe. After training at Fraser's Hill, Private Madge left for the First World War on 21 October 1915 on the HMAT Seang Bee in the company of the 11th Reinforcements to the 15th Battalion. He was 21 years of age.

After the voyage to the Middle East, the 15th Battalion, now part of the 4th Brigade, disembarked at Marseilles from Alexandria, and Madge was transported through France with many thousands of others to the western front. The 15th Battalion was engaged in some of the fiercest fighting at Pozieres, and on 11 August 1916 Madge is reported as wounded in action north-west of Pozieres and taken to a hospital at Etaples. In the days from 5 to 11 August with no concern for his own safety, Madge, while acting as a messenger, had moved between company and battalion headquarters under continued enemy artillery fire. All communication lines were cut and this meant messages about the current operations were carried by hand.

The account given in the Commonwealth Gazette, No. 62, 19 April 1917 reads:

These men [3483 Maitland MADGE and 4580 Sydney MAY] are recommended for conspicuous bravery while acting as messenger during operations north west of POZIERES from 5 to 11 August 1916. These men were continually moving to and from Company and Battalion Headquarters under intense H.E. artillery barrage. The telephone lines were being continually broken, and the only method of communication was then by messenger. They showed an utter disregard of their own safety, and an admirable contempt for danger, and it was entirely owing to their self-sacrifice that the operations were so well supported by our own artillery and that Battalion and Brigade Headquarters were so closely in touch with progress of operations. Our losses in messengers were very heavy. There were several instances of these messengers being blown up by H.E. shells exploding near them, and some of them were rendered semi unconscious from shell shock, but after a short rest returned to their dangerous work

Due to his actions Madge would later be decorated with the Military Medal, which would make him most probably one of the first Indigenous Australians to receive such an award from the King.

Madge was awarded the Military Medal on 1 October 1916 while he was still recovering in hospital. On 29 January 1917 he rejoined his battalion and on 4 July 1918 was wounded again. It is reported that even though he was wounded for the second time, he remained on duty. He was in France for the duration of the war and returned to Australia on the Ascanius in April 1919, and was discharged from service on 24 May 1919.

== Between the wars ==
Little is known about Madge's life after his return from the First World War. He is listed on the 1925 Electoral Roll for Maranoa as a labourer at Gore working in the Lime Quarry. By 1936, he was in North Queensland and listed on the Ingham electoral roll working as a labourer at Halifax.

== Second World War ==
When war was declared in August 1939, Madge was working in Townsville as a security guard. In October 1939 he again volunteered to serve in the Australian Army, and joined up in Townsville to the 1st Garrison Battalion even though he was now over 45 years old. His father had died in 1931; Madge's mobilisation papers list his next of kin as Miss Violet Madge of Townsville, his cousin.

By August 1941 Madge as part of the 2/26 Battalion, 8th Division had landed in Singapore. He was ill when taken prisoner by the Japanese forces in February 1942. He survived over two years at the Changi Camp and it is recorded that he died on 7 June 1944 while still a prisoner of war. He was buried at the Kranji War Cemetery, Singapore.

== Legacy ==
On 11 November 2015, during the national Remembrance Day service at the Australian War Memorial which honoured Australia's Indigenous diggers, the Prince of Wales and the Duchess of Cornwall placed poppies next to the names of Private Maitland Madge and Corporal Charles Harry Orme on the Roll of Honour wall.
