= Dean Semmens =

Australian indigenous water polo player (born 1979)

Personal information
- Born: 22 November 1979 (age 45) Sydney, Australia

Sport
- Sport: Water polo

Dean Semmens (born 22 November 1979) is an Australian indigenous water polo player who competed in the 2004 Summer Olympics.
