= Frank Roberts (boxer) =

Australian boxer (1945–2011)

Personal information
- Nickname: "Honest Frank"
- Citizenship: British (in 1964); Australian
- Born: 5 March 1945 Sydney, New South Wales
- Died: 7 February 2011 (aged 65) Armidale, New South Wales

Boxing career

Francis Roy "Frank" Roberts (5 March 1945 – 7 February 2011) was an Aboriginal Australian boxer who competed at the 1964 Tokyo Olympics in the welterweight division. "Honest Frank", as he was known, was the first Aboriginal Australian athlete to gain selection, and one of the first Indigenous Australians (along with boxer Adrian Blair and basketballer Michael Ah Matt) to participate in the Olympic Games. He was also the youngest boxer on the Australian boxing team.

== Early life and education ==
Francis Roy Roberts, known as Frank or Frankie, and nicknamed "Honest Frank", was born on 5 March 1945 in Sydney, the son of pastor Frank Roberts. Frank Roberts was a Widjabul Wia-bal and Githabul man.

He moved to Cubawee with his family as a child, and grew up there. Cubawee was an Aboriginal settlement in northern New South Wales adjacent to Lismore, set up in the 1930 and managed by the residents, headed by Frank's father.

Roberts went to Lismore High School.

There were many boxers in his immediate and extended family, including his brother Johnny, who boxed professionally. He was also related to Alby, Aub, Cyril, Steve, Harold, and Tommy Roberts – all of whom excelled in professional boxing.

== Career ==
In 1962 or 1963 he went to Sydney with his uncle, Fletcher Roberts and two cousins, Johnny (20) and Fletcher Roberts, Jnr (18). Both cousins were also good boxers.

Frank joined Allan Daley's boxing club. Within a year he had won 20 out of 25 fights, becoming state and national champion, and ensuring selection for the Olympics. In April 1964 he travelled with a group of boxers to New Zealand, where he fought Wally Coe.

In 1964 he was selected to represent Australia in the Tokyo Olympics. He was the first Aboriginal Australian athlete to gain selection, and one of the first three Indigenous Australians to participate in the Olympics, along with boxer Adrian Blair and basketballer Michael Ah Matt in the same year. He was also the youngest boxer on the Australian boxing team. He had to travel on a British passport, as Aboriginal Australians were not granted full Australian citizenship rights until after the 1967 referendum.

At the Olympics, on 12 October 1964 in the Round of 32 (Match #8), Roberts lost to Finnish boxer Pertti Purhonen by decision, 0-5 Perhonen went on to win a bronze medal in third place, while Roberts was ranked equal 17th with 13 others. While in Japan, Roberts was one of the Australian team members invited to dine with Emperor Hirohito.

Around 1971 Roberts moved to Armidale, New South Wales, where he trained young people in boxing at the Armidale Police Boys Club and the University of New England Sports Union. In 1997 he became a trainer and mentor at the Matar Boxing Club. He also drove the school bus and was a sought-after public speaker in the Armidale community.

In 2000, he participated in the Sydney Olympics torch relay.

== Recognition ==
Roberts was inducted into the Aboriginal and Islander Sports Hall of Fame.

On 26 January 2011 (Australia Day), Roberts received the Mayor's Special Contribution to the Community Award in Armidale. Mayor Peter Ducat said that he had been a leader and mentor for over 40 years, "a great leader in youth, and the examples I've seen is the work that he's been doing teaching kids boxing, teaching them fitness, teaching them to share and respect; all of those values we need".

Macleay College's Hatch website listed Roberts as an Honourable mention in their list of the greatest Indigenous sportsmen and women for NAIDOC Week 2019.

== Personal life ==
Roberts had a daughter, Dorothy.

== Death and legacy ==
Roberts died from a heart attack on 7 February 2011.

A funeral service was held for him on 16 February in the Armidale Town Hall, which included tributes from nearly 20 speakers, showing that he was "much loved, well regarded and highly respected". Over 400 people attended the service, including fellow Olympian boxer Athol McQueen. Roberts was buried at Armidale Cemetery.

=== Play ===
In late August 2024, Frank's cousin, theatre and arts director Rhoda Roberts, presented a new play with Northern Rivers Performing Arts (NORPA) in Lismore and Byron Bay, about Frank Roberts, entitled My Cousin Frank. Directed by Kirk Page, Roberts narrates the story of "a family's journey from the tumultuous era of dispersal and silence to navigating a world controlled by government policy". The show includes the story of Cubawee. On 3 March 2025, the NORPA production of the play debuted as part of the Adelaide Festival, having a three-night run at the Space Theatre in the Adelaide Festival Centre.
