= Danny Morseu =

Australian basketball player

Personal information
- Born: 1 January 1958 (age 68) Thursday Island, Queensland
- Listed height: 198 cm (6 ft 6 in)

Career information
- Playing career: 1979–1989
- Position: Forward

Career history
- 1979–1983: St. Kilda Saints
- 1984–1985: Geelong Supercats
- 1986–1989: Brisbane Bullets

Career highlights
- 3× NBL champion (1979, 1980, 1987); 2× All-NBL Team (1980, 1981); NBL Hall of Fame (2002); Victoria University Sport Hall of Fame (2007)

Danny Morseu (born 1 January 1958) is an Australian basketball player who played on the Australian national basketball team in the 1980 Summer Olympics and 1984 Summer Olympics.

== International career ==
Morseu played for the Australian team at the 1980 Summer Olympics in Moscow, where Australia finished eighth, and at the 1984 Summer Olympics in Los Angeles, where Australia finished seventh, their best Olympic result to that date. He also played twelve world cup matches for Australia.

== Club career ==
A Torres Strait Islander, Morseu was born in 1958 on Thursday Island in Far North Queensland. He spent his childhood in Tamwoy, a mission on Thursday Island, where he grew up without running water or electricity. He started playing basketball at school and despite being cut from his primary school team, he developed into a tall talented teenage athlete. After completing school he moved to Cairns where he played basketball and rugby league for local teams.

Morseu attracted the attention of National Basketball League coach Brian Kerle after playing a match against Kerle's club, the Melbourne-based St Kilda Saints – on tour of North Queensland. Kerle convinced Morseu to move to Melbourne in 1978, where he played in St Kilda's championship winning teams of 1979 and 1980. He played 217 NBL games in total, winning another NBL championship with the Brisbane Bullets in 1987.

In December 2017, Morseu was appointed head coach of the Toowoomba Mountaineers QBL men's side, the team he won a championship with in 1991.

== Later biography ==
In 1984, he completed a Bachelor of Arts majoring in recreation from Footscray Institute of Technology. He was employed in a range of activities for state and federal governments in Victoria and Queensland, including working in indigenous health. He has acted as a mentor for other indigenous basketball players such as Nathan Jawai and Patty Mills.

In May 2024, a jury found Morseu guilty of one count of bodily harm after punching a woman in the head eight times. He was sentenced to 18 months in prison, suspended after four months. However, Morseu was found not guilty of charges relating to common assault and deprivation of liberty.

== Awards ==
Inducted into the NBL Hall of Fame in 2002, Morseu was the first indigenous basketballer so honoured. He was inducted into the Victoria University Sport Hall of Fame in 2007.

== Personal ==
Morseu is the uncle of Australian Boomers players Patty Mills and Nathan Jawai.
