= Lloyd McDermott =

Australian barrister and rugby union player (1939–2019)

- Born: Lloyd Clive McDermott; 11 November 1939 Eidsvold, Queensland, Australia
- Died: 6 April 2019 (aged 79) Sydney, New South Wales, Australia
- School: Anglican Church Grammar School
- University: University of Queensland, University of Sydney, University of New South Wales

Rugby union career
- Position: Wing
International career
Years	Team	Apps	(Points)
1962	Australia	2	(0)

Lloyd Clive McDermott (1 November 1939 – 6 April 2019), also known as Mullenjaiwakka, was an Australian barrister and rugby union player. He was the first Australian Aboriginal barrister and one of the first Aboriginal persons to represent his country in rugby union, playing for the Wallabies against the New Zealand All Blacks in 1962. During South Africa's era of apartheid, McDermott made a principled decision to withdraw from the squad rather than play as an "honorary white" on a subsequent South African tour.

== Early life and education ==
Born on 1 November 1939 at Eidsvold, Queensland, McDermott had links to the Mununjali clan and Wakka Wakka people. The son of a farm labourer, Lloyd McDermott's academic and sporting prowess won him a scholarship to attend the Anglican Church Grammar School in East Brisbane.

== Rugby career ==
An outstanding schoolboy athlete, he went on to play as the wing for the Australia national rugby union team, commonly known as the Wallabies. Thus, he became the one of first Indigenous players to represent Australia. He played 10 rugby union matches for Queensland against Fiji, France and the New Zealand "All Blacks" while studying law at the University of Queensland. He then played two Test matches for the Wallabies against the All Blacks in 1962. He refused to participate in a 1963 tour to South Africa, objecting to being classified by the host as an "honorary white" (the only basis on which he could compete against the all-white South African Springbok team under South Africa's apartheid regime). He returned briefly to rugby league, playing for the Wynnum Manly club in 1964.

He was the first Aboriginal person to represent his country in rugby union, after Cec Ramalli.

== Law ==
Lloyd Clive McDermott became Australia's first Indigenous barrister. After graduating in law, he worked in the Commonwealth Deputy Crown Solicitor's Office, and was then admitted as a barrister in New South Wales. He also completed degrees in science and criminology from the University of Sydney and the University of New South Wales. In later years he practised part-time at the bar, mainly in crime and appellate work. Also a part-time member of the Mental Health Tribunal of New South Wales, he was also a trustee of the New South Wales Bar Association Indigenous Lawyers' Trust.

== Community service ==
Throughout his career, McDermott gave time and energy to promoting opportunities for Indigenous youth, male and female, as founder of the Lloyd McDermott Sports Foundation. In association with the Australian Sports Foundation, the Lloyd McDermott Rugby Development Team works with young people to achieve their dreams through development camps, educational scholarships and mentoring. The team holds camps, training sessions and competitions in association with the National Centre of Indigenous Excellence (NCIE).

He also served as an Ambassador for Indigenous Fund of the Brisbane Boys College.

== Personal life ==
McDermott had a single daughter, Phillipa McDermott, and a love of Jazz, Motown, and R&B music.

== Recognition and legacy ==
In 2009, at the Bar Association of Queensland Annual Conference, a highlight was the launch of the Mullenjaiwakka Trust for Indigenous Legal Students, named in honour of McDermott (Mullenjaiwakka). The Trust was established to assist Indigenous law students towards a career at the bar.

In 2016, McDermott was a recipient of the Queensland Greats Awards.
