= Adrian Blair =

Australian boxer (1943–2008)

Personal information
- Nationality: Australian
- Born: 21 December 1943 Cherbourg, Queensland, Australia
- Died: 2008
- Height: 166 cm (5 ft 5 in)
- Weight: 62 kg (137 lb)

Boxing career

Adrian Blair (21 December 1943 – 2008) was an Indigenous Australian boxer. He is known for being one of the first three Indigenous athletes to be included in the Australian Olympic team ever, competing in the 1964 Tokyo Olympics in Japan.

== Biography ==
Adrian Blair was born on 21 December 1943 in Cherbourg, Queensland.

During his boxing career, he was 166 cm in height and weighed 62 kg (137 lb). In 1961 he became the national featherweight champion, going on to become the national lightweight champion in 1962 and 1964.

He competed at the 1962 British Empire and Commonwealth Games in Perth, Western Australia.

In the six years prior to his selection for the Australian Olympic team in 1964, Blair fought 70 fights, winning 47 of them. He competed at the 1964 Tokyo Olympics in the lightweight division. His first round was a bye, after which he won his bout against Taiwanese boxer Chee-Chu Wang by knockout, less than two minutes into the fight. He lost his third round on points to Soviet boxer Vilikton Barannikov, who went on to win the silver medal.

Blair was one of three Indigenous Australian athletes to be the first to be selected for the Australian Olympic team, along with fellow boxer Frank Roberts and basketballer Michael Ah Matt.

He was inducted into the Aboriginal and Islander Sports Hall of Fame.

Blair died in 2008.
