= Roger Brown (cricketer) =

Australian cricketer (born 1959)

Personal information
- Full name: Roger Leedham Brown
- Born: 9 August 1959 (age 67); Launceston, Tasmania, Australia
- Batting: Right-handed
- Bowling: Right-arm fast-medium
- Role: Bowler

Domestic team information
- Years: Team
- 1984/85–1986/87: Tasmania
- FC debut: 19 October 1984 Tasmania v WA
- Last FC: 6 March 1987 Tasmania v SA
- LA debut: 13 October 1984 Tasmania v WA
- Last LA: 15 March 1987 Tasmania v SA

Career statistics
Competition	First-class	List A
Matches	32	9
Runs scored	467	76
Batting average	13.34	38.00
100s/50s	0/0	0/0
Top score	49	40*
Balls bowled	5,532	482
Wickets	87	9
Bowling average	39.68	47.77
5 wickets in innings	2	0
10 wickets in match	1	0
Best bowling	7/80	3/52
Catches/stumpings	12/–	3/–
- Source: Cricinfo, 15 September 2011

Roger Leedham Brown (born 9 August 1959) is a former Australian first-class cricketer, who until the arrival of Jason Gillespie, had played more first-class matches than any other Aboriginal Australian.

Born in Launceston, Tasmania, Brown played for Tasmania between 1984 and 1987, and represented Young Australia in Zimbabwe in 1985 and the Australian Prime Minister's XI against England in 1986–87. Brown was also a leading soccer player in Tasmania, representing Launceston Juventus.

== Sources ==
- Tatz, C. & Tatz, P. (2000) Black Gold, Aboriginal Studies Press: Canberra. ISBN 0-85575-367-6.
