= Frank Ivory =

Indigenous Australian rugby union player

Frank Ivory was the first Indigenous Australian to play representative rugby union (for Queensland). This occurred in 1893.

The Frank Ivory Medal is named after him.
