= Michael Ah Matt =

Australian basketball player (1942–1983)

Personal information
- Born: 30 November 1942 Townsville, Queensland, Australia
- Died: 14 February 1983 (aged 40)
- Listed height: 188 cm (6 ft 2 in)
- Listed weight: 73 kg (161 lb)

Career information
- Playing career: 1959–1979

Career history
- 1959–1979: South Adelaide Panthers

Michael Henry George Ah Matt (30 November 1942 – 14 February 1983) was an Indigenous Australian professional basketball player. He played for the Australian national basketball team at the 1964 Tokyo Olympics.

Ah Matt was born on 30 November 1942 in Townsville, Queensland, and grew up in Darwin, Northern Territory. He represented the Northern Territory at the 1959 Australian Championships. After the Championships he moved to Adelaide, South Australia to play with the South Adelaide Panthers. He played a then record 588 games over twenty seasons with the Panthers.

In 1964, he was a member of the Australian team at the 1964 Tokyo Olympics. In 1968, he was a member of the Australian team that participated in the pre-Olympic qualifying tournament in Monterrey, though that team failed to qualify for the 1968 Summer Olympics.

Former Australian Olympian Darryl Pearce said of Ah Matt, "He had an amazing sense of where he was on the court and he could see players where no-one could understand how he could actually pass the ball the way he did."

Ah Matt died of a heart attack on 14 February 1983.

== Achievements and recognition ==
- 1964: With Adrian Blair and Frank Roberts, the first Indigenous Australians to represent Australia at the Olympic Games in 1964
- !994: Inductee, Aboriginal and Islander Sports Hall of Fame
- 2010: Inductee, Australian Basketball Hall of Fame
