= Cecil Ramalli =

- Born: 10 June 1919 Mungindi, New South Wales
- Died: 1998 (aged 78–79)
- School: Hurlstone Agricultural High School

Rugby union career
Provincial / State sides
Years	Team	Apps	(Points)
1938–1939	New South Wales	4	(6)
International career
Years	Team	Apps	(Points)
1938	Australia	2	(0)

Cecil Ramalli (10 June 1919 – 1998) was an Australian rugby union player and soldier. Ramalli played twice for Australia.

== Early life and education ==
Ramalli was born on 10 June 1919 to Ali Ramalli and Adeline Doyle in Mungindi. His father was a merchant from Lahore who arrived in Sydney in 1898 to work as a hawker. Actual name of his father was Reham Ali son of Nasher from village Langrial District Gujrat Punjab Pakistan..who was Muslim...Ramalli's mother was an Aboriginal Australian woman from near Mungindi, New South Wales.

In 1934 Ramalli began attending Hurlstone Agricultural High School in Sydney.

== Rugby career ==
At Hurlstone, his aptitude for rugby was discovered. By his third season of school rugby, he had become the captain of the school's first XV.

Ramalli made his representative debut for New South Wales at the age of 18 in 1938.

In August 1938 Ramalli made his debut for Australia in the second Test match between Australia and New Zealand at the Brisbane Exhibition Ground. He also played the third Test in Sydney, which would be his final match for the Wallabies.

Ramalli was named in a 29-player squad to tour Britain in 1939. The team arrived in Portsmouth the day before Britain declared war on Germany. With the outbreak of war, the team returned to Australia.

== War service ==
In 1940 Ramalli enlisted with the Australian Imperial Force after initially trying to join the Royal Australian Air Force and the Royal Australian Navy.
