= The Showgrounds, Wangaratta =

Venue in Wangaratta, Victoria

Wangaratta Showgrounds Norm Minns Oval
- The Showgrounds
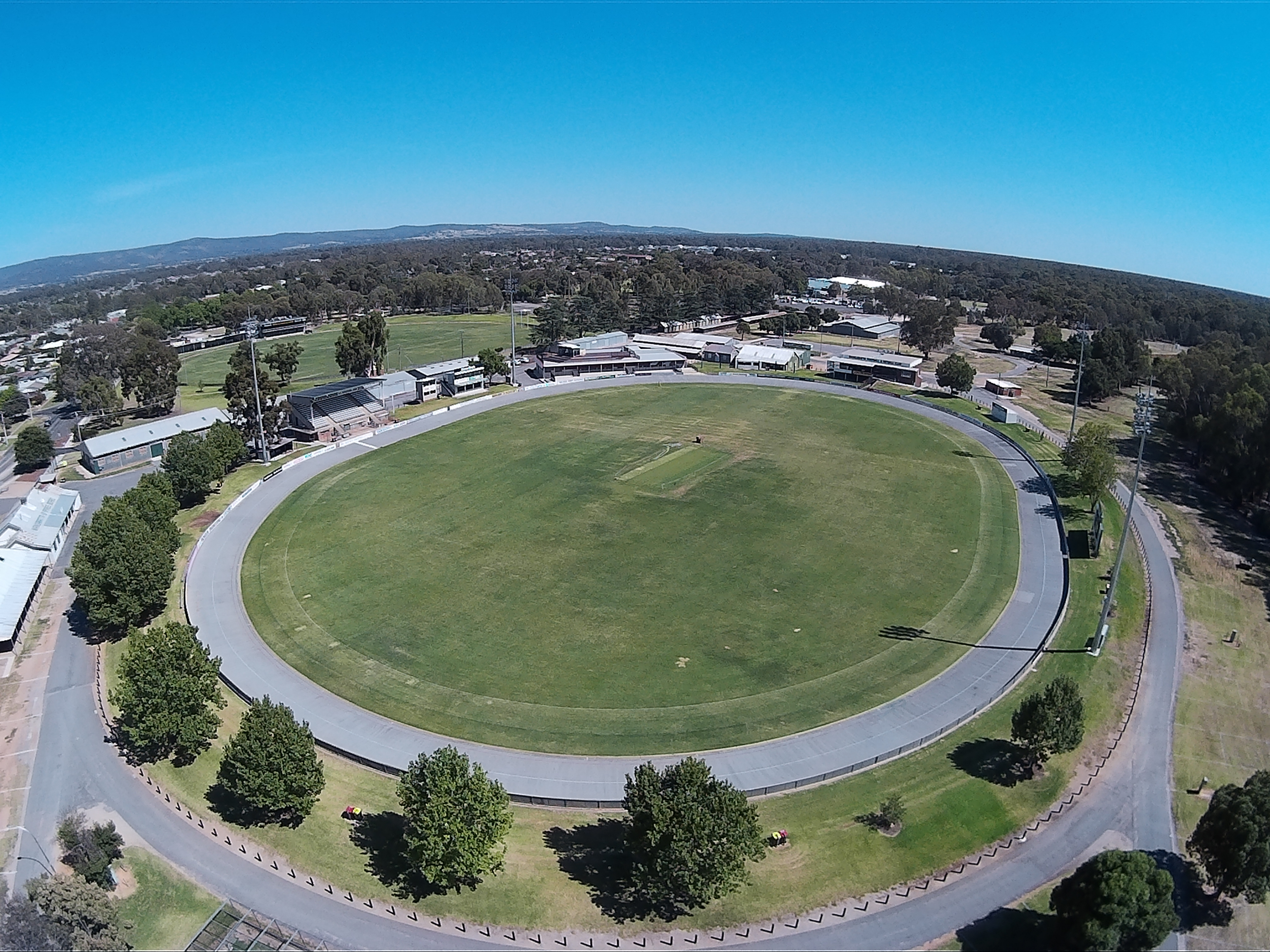
- Interactive map of Wangaratta Showgrounds; Norm Minns Oval
- Full name: Norm Minns Oval
- Former names: Wangaratta Showgrounds
- Location: Wangaratta, Victoria, Australia
- Coordinates: 36°20′47.12″S 146°18′53.98″E
- Owner: Rural City of Wangaratta
- Capacity: 15,000 approx.
- Surface: Santa Ana couch grass/turf cricket wicket(Oval)
- Scoreboard: Digital
- Record attendance: 11,000 (2 March 2013: AFL Pre-Season: Essendon vs. Richmond)

Construction
- Opened: 1855
- Renovated: 1991 (oval)

Tenants
- Wangaratta Magpies F.N.C. (OMFNL); Wangaratta Magpies C.C. (WDCA); Murray Bushrangers; Junior Magpies Football Club; Wangaratta Sports Club Inc. Wangaratta Cycling Club

Ground information
- Country: Australia
- Owner: Rural City of Wangaratta
- End names
- "Northern End" "Southern End" / "City End"

International information

The Wangaratta Showgrounds is situated on the banks of the Ovens River, close to central Wangaratta and provides a large venue for a host of local sports and community clubs.

It has hosted the Wangaratta Agricultural Show since 1860 and the annual Wangaratta Athletic Carnival since 1917.

The sports oval is a major North Eastern cricket and football venue in Wangaratta, Victoria, Australia and is known as the Norm Minns Oval.

== History ==
The first annual exhibition (Wangaratta Show) was hosted in 1860 by the Ovens and Murray Agricultural and Horticultural Association on land near the Ovens River, Wangaratta.

The Boxing Day Wangaratta Hospital Fete was first held at The Showgrounds in 1882, which also included an athletic program.

The first recorded international cricket match hosted on the ground came when Wangaratta played the touring Fijians in 1908.

In February 1933 at the Wangaratta Sports Carnival, at The Showgrounds, Wangaratta, Austin Robertson Sr. broke the world record for 140 yards in a time of 13.1&1/2 / 16 seconds.

In 1950, American Olympic sprinter, Barney Ewell, ran the fastest ever 100 yards in Australia at the Wangaratta Carnival in a time of 9.5 seconds and several weeks later won the World Professional Sprint Championships in Wangaratta.

The ground held its first first-class match in 1986 when Victoria played Queensland in the Sheffield Shield.

Ten years later a second first-class match was played there between Victoria and the West Indians.

A List A / 50 over, limited over match was played there in the 2005/06 ING Cup between Victoria and New South Wales.

The Showgrounds Oval serves as a football ground in the winter. It is the home ground of the Wangaratta Football Club, Junior Magpies Football Club and the Murray Bushrangers Football Club and is one of the Ovens & Murray Football League's main two venues, alongside Lavington Sports Ground, Albury.

The venue secured the rights to host five Australian Football League pre-season games between 2012 and 2021; however, the first of those matches, to have been played between St Kilda and Essendon in 2012, was cancelled after Essendon's chartered flights were unable to land in or near Wangaratta due to the very heavy afternoon rain throughout northern Victoria. The venue also hosted two matches in the 2005 Australian Football International Cup.

The venue also has a bicycle track, and floodlighting suitable for night matches. The oval was renamed the Norm Minns Oval in honour of Norm Minns, who played in four consecutive O&MFL premierships with Wangaratta from 1949 to 1952, won another O&MFL flag as captain-coach of Benalla in 1953, and went on to the committees and selection boards for both the Wangaratta and the O&MFL interleague teams.

The Showgrounds hosted the Ovens and King Football League grand final between 2005 and 2010 after the O&KFNL grand final was played Tarrawingee between 1982 and 2004. The O&KFNL has now been played at the W J Findlay Oval, Wangaratta from 2011 onwards.

== Wangaratta Athletic Club Carnival ==
The official Wangaratta Athletic Carnival has been held at the Wangaratta Showgrounds sports oval since 1922. It commenced as the Anzac Day / RSL Carnival in 1919, with the Victorian Governor, Lord Arthur Stanley in attendance, along with 4000 spectators. The carnival was then taken over by the Wangaratta Athletic Club in 1922 and is run under Victorian Athletic League rules.

The sports competed for over the years have been - athletics, cycling, high jump, pole vault, whippet racing, wood-chopping, tent pegging, tug of war, pigeon racing and highland dancing, along with side-shows and fireworks on display most years to round out the night session of the carnival.

A regular at the Wangaratta Carnival was Jimmy Sharman's boxing show, where locals were always eager to put their mits on against Sharman's troupe.

At the 1921 carnival Lieutenant Parer in his DeHaviland aeroplane gave an exhibition of thrilling stunts over the Showgrounds.

The main event of the carnival has always been the Wangaratta Gift, initially run over 130 yards, but now run over 120 metres since 1973. A highlight of the carnival has been the running of the final under lights too.

In 1929, world sprint champion, Tom Miles ran at Wangaratta, but was beaten in his heat of the Wangaratta Gift. The club also installed a new public speech system, which included 12 loud speakers.

In 1930, 18 year old local athlete, Mick Maroney was the first runner from Wangaratta to win the Gift. He also won the 70 yard Warby Gift. World Professional sprint champions, Lynch Cooper and Austin Robertson Sr competed in Wangaratta for a number of years in the late 1920s and early 1930s.

By the mid-1920s, the carnival was widely known as the "Cock of the North" carnival.

There where 567 nominations for events at the 1933 Wangaratta Sports Carnival, at The Showgrounds, Wangaratta, which saw Austin Robertson Sr. break the world record for 140 yards in a time of 13.1&1/2 / 16 seconds.

In 1933, the carnival date was changed to Foundation (Australia) Day on Monday 29 January 1933, instead of the first Saturday in February, with the carnival increasing the prize money by £100.

In January 1935, Olympic 100 and 200 metre gold medallist, Eddie Tolan attempted to break the 90 yard world record time of 8 & 7/10th seconds in Wangaratta, Victoria at the Wangaratta Athletic Carnival on the fast Wangaratta Showgrounds track. With a crowd of 15,000 in attendance, Tolan unfortunately pulled a leg muscle on the day in a prior running event and was then unable to attempt to break the record.

By 1937, the prize money for the Wangaratta Austral Wheelrace over one mile was increased to £120, making it the most liberal cycling prize in rural Australia, which attracted Australian cyclist, but based in the United States, Cecil Walker and Italian cyclist, Nino Borsari.

In 1938, local porter at Wangaratta Railway Station, Alf Whittaker took out the Wangaratta Gift. In 1940, veteran cyclist, Jim Beer was 40 years old when he took out the win in the Wangaratta Wheelrace.

In 1950, American Olympic sprinter, Barney Ewell, ran the fastest ever 100 yards in Australia at the Wangaratta Carnival in a time of 9.5 seconds and several weeks later won the World Professional Sprint Championships in Wangaratta. Ewell also won the 1950 Wangaratta Gift, off scratch, run over 130 yards in 12.1 seconds, defeating Carlton footballer, Laurie Kerr.

In 1950, Panamanian sprinter, Lloyd LaBeach, who won two bronze medals during the 1948 Summer Olympics competed at the Wangaratta Athletic Carnival.

In 1961, Peter Sheales smashed his own 880 yards world professional record with a time of 1 minute, 51.1 seconds.

1946 Stawell Gift runner up, 1952 Scottish Powderhall Gift winner and Footscray player Eric Cumming was a regular competitor at Wangaratta in the late 1940 and early 1950's.

In 1954, there was a dead-heat in the final of the Wangaratta Gift between former Olympic gold medallist, Herb McKenley (off scratch) and 21 year old Indigo farmer, Des Shelley (off 9.75 yards) with Shelley winning the run off in 12.3 seconds. Then in 1956, there was another dead-heat between Des Cook and John Dinsdale in the Gift final, with Cook winning the replay in 11.9 seconds, off 10 metres. Dinsdale followed up by winning the 1957 Wangaratta Gift.

Caulfield middle-distance runner, John Toleman set a new professional world record for the two mile in a time of 9 minutes, 5.7 seconds in 1960.

Former VFL boundary umpire, Peter Saultry won his second Wangaratta Gift in 1966, after previously winning in 1964.

The Wangaratta Gift and Wangaratta Wheelrace were known as the Marlboro Gift and Marlboro Wheelrace between 1972 and 1983, after the cigarette sponsor.

When Gary Parkes won the 1978 Wangaratta Gift, he became the third Essendon player to win this prestigious running race, behind Norm McDonald in 1949 and Lance Mann in 1952. McDonald's nephew, Lindsay Powell won the 1977 Wangaratta Gift. Interestingly, Essendon footballer, Neil Besanko won the Burramine Gift in 1971 and 1972.

Heathcote's Matthew Webster won the 1984 City of Wangaratta - Silver Jubilee Wangaratta Gift, beating local runner, Greg O'Keefe, who went onto win the 1985 Wangaratta Gift.

A regular at the Wangaratta Carnival over many years was former Corowa premiership player, Ken Eales, who was an accomplished middle-distance runner and local trainer too.

| | Wangaratta Athletic Club Carnival | | | | | | | | | | |
| Year | President | Secretary | Treasurer | ANZAC Gift | City | Handicap | Time | Prize | Austral Wheelrace | Gate | Date |
|---|---|---|---|---|---|---|---|---|---|---|---|
| 1919 | David Langlands | Les J Hellier | | David J Lewis | Ariah Park | 9.5 yards | 12&1/5 | £100 | | £165 | 25/04/1919 |
| 1920 | Harold J Mulder | L J Hellier | | A Biggs | Tambo | 11 | 11&4/5 | £100 | | £200 | 26/04/1920 |
| 1921 | Harold J Mulder | L J Hellier | | J P Brookfield | North Preston | 10 | 12.0 | £100 | | £276 | 25/04/1921 |
| Year | President | Secretary | Treasurer | Wangaratta Gift 130 yards | City | Handicap | Time | Prize | Wangaratta Wheelrace | Gate | Date |
| 1922 | Arthur C Callander | L J Hellier | | A H Webb | | 13.5 | 12&4/5 | £100 | | | 05/04/1922 |
| 1923 | Arthur C Callander | L J Hellier | | George H Naylor | Malvern | 13.0 | 12&2/5 | £100 | | | 23/03/1923 |
| 1924 | Arthur C Callander | L J Hellier | | Jim McGaffin | Albury | | 12.0 | £100 | | £380 | 02/02/1924 |
| 1925 | Arthur C Callander | Matt O'Donohue | | R C Hicks | Echuca | 10.5 | 12&1/5 | £200 | | £350 | 07/02/1925 |
| 1926 | Arthur C Callander | Matt O'Donohue | | F E O'Brien | Richmond | 12 | 12&1/5 | £200 | | £400 | 06/02/1926 |
| 1927 | Arthur C Callander | Matt O'Donohue | Mick Duggan | Joe J O'Sullivan | North Melbourne | 12 | 12.0 | £200 | Horace Horder | £390 | 05/02/1927 |
| 1928 | Arthur C Callander | Matt O'Donohue | Mick Duggan | George F Bauer | Bowen, Qld | 7.5 | 11&4/5 | £150 | Cecil Liddle | £443 | 04/02/1928 |
| 1929 | Arthur C Callander | Matt O'Donohue | Mick Duggan | Joe J O'Sullivan | North Melbourne | 8 | 12.0 | £150 | Jackie Kean | £571 | 02/02/1929 |
| 1930 | Arthur C Callander | Matt O'Donohue | Mick Duggan | Mick Maroney | Wangaratta | 12 | 12.0 | £150 | Joe Parmely | £578 | 01/02/1930 |
| 1931 | Arthur C Callander | Matt O'Donohue | Mick Duggan | Cecil W Pettiona | Port Melbourne | 6.5 | 12.0 | £150 | W "Bill" Penman | £518 | 31/01/1931 |
| 1932 | Arthur C Callander | Matt O'Donohue | Mick Duggan | Vic A Ricco | Fitzroy | | 12.0 | £140 | Arch Ploog | £423 | 06/02/1932 |
| 1933 | Arthur C Callander | Matt O'Donohue | Mick Duggan | Cecil Clamp | Camberwell | 12 | 11&8/16 | £140 | Frank W Doyle | £520 | 04/02/1933 |
| 1934 | Arthur C Callander | Matt O'Donohue | Mick Duggan | Jim T Supple | Lilydale | 12 | 11&4/5 | £152 | Tom Glazebrook | £537 | 29/01/1934 |
| 1935 | Arthur C Callander | Matt O'Donohue | Mick Duggan | Tom Roberts | Mulwala, NSW | 2 | 12&4/10 | £150 | E "Ted" G Moore | £784 | 28/01/1935 |
| 1936 | Arthur C Callander | Matt O'Donohue | Mick Duggan | A M McNamara | Merrylands, NSW | 9.5 | 12.0 | £150 | R "Dick" J Moore | £913 | 25&27/01/1935 |
| 1937 | Arthur C Callander | Matt O'Donohue | SG Thompson | Ron N Wilson | St. Kilda | 11.25 | 12.0 | £170 | W "Bill" Moritz | | 30/1/&1/2/1937 |
| 1938 | Arthur C Callander | Matt O'Donohue | | Alf W Whitaker | Wangaratta | 12 | 11&9/10 | £150 | Len Rogers | | 29&31/01/1938 |
| 1939 | Arthur C Callander | Matt O'Donohue | | Gordon A Lawson | Richmond | 11 | 11&6/10 | £150 | W "Bill" Dickie | | 28&30/01/1939 |
| 1940 | Arthur C Callander | Matt O'Donohue | | Russell McInness | Port Melbourne | 7 | 11&7/10 | £150 | Jim Beer | | 27&29/01/1940 |
| 1941 | Arthur C Callander | Matt O'Donohue | | Ralph E Bradley | Griffith, NSW | 7.75 | 12&4/10 | £60 | Syd Jamieson | | 27/01/1941 |
| 1942 | Arthur C Callander | Matt O'Donohue | | | | | | | | | In recess > WW2 |
| 1943 | Arthur C Callander | Matt O'Donohue | | | | | | | | | In recess > WW2 |
| 1944 | Arthur C Callander | C S Faulkner | | | | | | | | | In recess > WW2 |
| 1945 | Arthur C Callander | C S Faulkner | | A J Bird | North Fitzroy | 5.5 | 12&2/16 | £100 | Duncan Hunter | | 27&29/01/1945 |
| 1946 | Arthur C Callander | R C MacKenzie | | Will E Kelly | Essendon | 10 | 12&1/10 | £275 | E "Ted" Easton | £1385 | 26&28/01/1946 |
| 1947 | Arthur C Callander | R C MacKenzie | | Frank Seymour | Wangaratta | 7.5 | | £275 | Geoff Debus | | 25&27/01/1947 |
| 1948 | W J Law | R C MacKenzie | | F J Walsh | Glebe | 7.5 | 11&9/10 | £275 | Herb Guyatt | | 24&26/01/1948 |
| 1949 | W J Law | R C MacKenzie | G E Debble | Norm D McDonald | Essendon | 5.5 | 12.0 | £275 | Arthur Dunn | | 29&31/01/1949 |
| 1950 | Martin J Seymour | W R McDonald | | H N "Barney" Ewell | Pennsylvania | scratch | 12.1 | £275 | Vin Smith | £1607 | 28&30/01/1950 |
| 1951 | Martin J Seymour | W R McDonald | | Tom Pattison | Marrar | 8.5 | 11.9 | £275 | Max Ryan | | 27&29/01/1951 |
| 1952 | Martin J Seymour | Frank A Ballantine | | Lance Mann | Albury | 8.5 | 11.9 | £400 | Alby Saunders | £1874 | 26&28/01/1952 |
| 1953 | Martin J Seymour | Frank A Ballantine | | W "Bill" Clingan | Ballarat | 8.75 | 11.9 | £345 | Tom Jobling | £2010 | 24&26/01/1953 |
| 1954 | J K Philips | Frank A Ballantine | | Des J Shelley | Indigo | 9.75 | 12.3 | £345 | Sid Patterson | | 01/02/1943 |
| 1955 | J K Philips | Frank A Ballantine | | L J "Jim" Clancy | Yarrawonga | 8.5 | 12.0 | £340 | Hector Sutherland | | 29&31/01/1955 |
| 1956 | R Flanders | Frank A Ballantine | | Des J Cook | Ballarat | 10 | 11.9 | £340 | Allan Geddes | | 28&30/01/1956 |
| 1957 | R Flanders | Frank A Ballantine | | John F Dinsdale | Nth Melbourne | 6.75 | 11.9 | £340 | Charlie Smith | | 26&28/01/1957 |
| 1958 | R Flanders | Frank A Ballantine | | Jim P Doolan | Wangaratta | 6.5 | 12.1 | £340 | Ron Murray | | 27/01/1958 |
| 1959 | R "Dick" J Moore | Frank A Ballantine | | Stan H Warden | Niddre | 10.25 | 11.8 | £ | Ray Sterry | | 26/01/1959 |
| 1960 | R "Dick" J Moore | Frank A Ballantine | | John V Kent | Mentone | 3 | 12.4 | £ | Jim Coyle | | 01/02/1960 |
| 1961 | R "Dick" J Moore | Frank A Ballantine | | Brian F Page | Newport | 5.75 | 12.1 | £ | Terry Ryan | | 30/01/1961 |
| 1962 | R "Dick" J Moore | Frank A Ballantine | | Eddy E Rich | Maryborough | 12 | | £ | Jack Sommer | | 29/01/1962 |
| 1963 | T A Klemm | Frank A Ballantine | | Trevor Partington | Greensborough | 9.25 | 12.2 | £ | Terry Wallace | | 28/01/1963 |
| 1964 | A E Webster | R "Dick" B Pendlebury | | Peter Saultry | North Blackburn | 4.5 | 12.4 | £ | Merv Dean | | 27/01/1964 |
| 1965 | A E Webster | Frank A Ballantine | | R D "Mick" Clifford | Fawkner | 9.25 | 12.3 | £ | Sid Patterson | | 01/02/1965 |
| 1966 | A "Keith" Bradbury | Frank A Ballantine | | Peter Saultry | North Blackburn | 6.5 | | £ | Bruce Clark | | 31/01/1966 |
| 1967 | A "Keith" Bradbury | R "Dick" B Pendlebury | | Mick Tancredi | Syndal | 12 | 11.9 | $ | Brian Delanty | | 30/01/1967 |
| 1968 | A "Keith" Bradbury | R "Dick" B Pendlebury | | Colin C Burnett | Pakenham | 10.25 | 12.2 | $ | K McCarthy | | 29/01/1968 |
| 1969 | A "Keith" Bradbury | R "Dick" B Pendlebury | | G Rochie | Glen Iris | 9.5 | | $ | Keith Oliver | | 02/02/1969 |
| 1970 | A "Keith" Bradbury | R "Dick" B Pendlebury | | Maurie Purss | Albury | 7.5 | 11.8 | $ | R Russell | | 26/01/1970 |
| 1971 | Ivan F Whelan | R "Dick" B Pendlebury | | K Griffin | Springvale | 11.0 | 11.9 | $ | Barry Waddell | | 01/02/1971 |
| 1972 | Ivan F Whelan | A L Stewart | | Ray Brunton | Heathmont | 11 | 11.7 | $ | Gordon Johnson | | 31/01/1972 |
| 1973 | Ivan F Whelan | Tom J Waters | | Gary Scott | Ararat | 8.75 | 12.2 | $ | C Reinmuth | | 27-29/01/1973 |
| 1974 | L H Hayward | Tom J Waters | | T "John" Mowat | Pascoe Vale | 6.30 | | $ | R Whetters | | |
| 1975 | L H Hayward | Tom J Waters | | Reg Austin | Sydney | 7.75 | 12.1 | $ | Allan "Pud" J Vincent | | |
| 1976 | Ron G Hearn | Tom J Waters | | W H Vines | Wantirna South | 7 | | $ | Laurie Venn | | 24-26/01/1976 |
| 1977 | Ron G Hearn | Tom J Waters | | Lindsay Powell | Ballarat | 7 | 12.1 | $ | Chris Salisbury | | 29-31/01/1977 |
| 1978 | Ron G Hearn | Tom J Waters | | Gary Parkes | East Keilor | 9.5 | 12.0 | $ | Ian Petts | | 28-30/01/1978 |
| 1979 | Bernie J Hallinan | Ron G Hearn | | Robin Baker | Airport West | | | $ | David Sanders | | 29/01/1979 |
| 1980 | Bernie J Hallinan | T Bromilow | | Joe Logan | South Yarra | 7.0 | 12.2 | $ | Peter Simpson | | 26-28/01/1980 |
| 1981 | Tom J Waters | T Bromilow | | John De Coite | Ferntree Gully | | | | Greg Fentonby | | |
| 1982 | Frank Holt | T Bromilow | | Chris Blake | Stawell | 9.50 | 12.5 | $ | Philip Sawyer | | 02/02/1982 |
| 1983 | Frank Holt | T Bromilow | | Peter Fitzgerald | Endeavour Hills | 8.50 | | | E Turner | | 29-31/01/1983 |
| 1984 | Geoff Webster | T Bromilow | | Matthew P Webster | Heathcote | 4.50 | 12.31 | | Michael Crowe | | 28-30/01/1984 |
| 1985 | Geoff Webster | P Walsh | | Greg J O'Keeffe | Wangaratta | 7.50 | 12.23 | $3000 | D Dew | | |
| 1986 | Geoff Webster | Frank Holt | | Andrew Walker | Hawick | | 12.08 | | Darren Clarke | | 25-27/01/1986 |
| 1987 | Ron Smith | Frank Holt | | Frank Corsello | Templestowe | | | | A Stewart | | |
| 1988 | Ron Smith | Frank Holt | | Colin Langley | Tasmania | | | | Stephen Pate | | |
| 1989 | Ron Smith | Frank Holt | | Robert Ballard | Albury | 2.25 | 12.23 | | D Rice | | |
| 1990 | Ron Smith | Frank Holt | | R Kirsopp | Ascot Vale | | | | Glenn Clarke | | |
| 1991 | Ron Smith | Frank Holt | | Peter Crane | Watsonia | | | | R Ploog | | |
| 1992 | David McCabe | Frank Holt | | Rodney Green | Corowa | | | | D Dew | | |
| 1993 | David McCabe | Kevin Howard | | K McConnon | Melbourne | | | | A Harding | | |
Wangaratta Sports Club Inc.
| 1994 | David McCabe | Kevin Howard | | T Goldie | Sth Blackburn | | | | P Gallagher | | |
| 1995 | David McCabe | Kevin Howard | | Walter Pasquali | Wangaratta | | 12.21 | $5000 | D Derrico | | |
| 1996 | Greg J O'Keeffe | Karen Deans | | Kevin Hanlon | Nth Caulfield | | | | N Clarke | | |
| 1997 | Greg J O'Keeffe | John Mullins | | Jason Boulton | Wangaratta | | | | A Salisbury | | |
| 1998 | Greg J O'Keeffe | John Mullins | | C Kuchel | Glen Iris | | | | Shane Kelly | | |
| 1999 | Greg J O'Keeffe | John Mullins | | S Warden | | | | | A Read | | |
| 2000 | Greg J O'Keeffe | Graeme Taylor | | P Walsh | Werribee | | | | Baden Cooke | | |
| 2001 | Greg J O'Keeffe | Graeme Taylor | | M Callard | Werribee | | | | S Collins | | |
| 2002 | Greg J O'Keeffe | Graeme Taylor | | Everton Evelyn | Barbados | | | | A Rix | | |
| 2003 | Greg J O'Keeffe | Graeme Taylor | | John Hilditch | Scotland | | | | T Wilksch | | |
| 2004 | Greg J O'Keeffe | Graeme Taylor | | Justin Lewis | Melbourne | | | | T Wilsch | | |
| 2005 | Greg J O'Keeffe | Graeme Taylor | | D Arthur | Glen Waverley | | | | R Worn | | |
| 2006 | Greg J O'Keeffe | Graeme Taylor | | Jason Boulton | Wangaratta | | | | J Moroni | | |
| 2007 | Greg J O'Keeffe | Graeme Taylor | | Andrew Flanigan | East Ringwood | 9.75 | 12.45 | $4,000 | K Markwood | | |
| 2008 | Greg J O'Keeffe | Graeme Taylor | | Craig Foley | Keilor Park | 10.25 | 12.38 | | E Wilson | | |
| 2009 | Greg J O'Keeffe | Graeme Taylor | | Robert Ballard | Albury | 6.25 | 12.35 | | T Griffiths | | |
| 2010 | Greg J O'Keeffe | Graeme Taylor | | Glenn Stephens | Bendigo | 14.25 | 12.331 | | S Kilpatrick | | |
| 2011 | | Graeme Taylor | | Todd Ireland | Warranwood | | | | M Flood | | |
| 2012 | | Graeme Taylor | | Cam Dunbar | Ringwood | 6.75 | 12.58 | $3500 | Alex Meyland | | |
| 2013 | | Graeme Taylor | | Rhys Parkinson | Melton South | 9.50 | 12.440 | | D Mann | | |
| 2014 | | Graeme Taylor | | M Hargreaves | Tarnett | 6.25 | 12.671 | | B Abels | | |
| 2015 | | Graeme Taylor | | Paul Tancredi | Essendon | 7.50 | 12.385 | $3500 | T McDonald | | |
| 2016 | | Graeme Taylor | | Paul Tancredi | Essendon | 6.75 | 12.76 | | N Abels | | |
| 2017 | | Graeme Taylor | | Harrison Kerr | Park Orchards | 9.50 | 12.954 | | S O'Dea | | |
| 2018 | | Graeme Taylor | | Hayden Wyllie | Thurgoona | 9.0 | 12.37 | $4,000 | Discontinued | | |
| 2019 | | Graeme Taylor | | Jason Bailey | Pakenham | 9.75 | 12.36 | $5,000 | N/A | | |
| 2020 | | Graeme Taylor | | Jason Bailey | Pakenham | | | | N/A | | |
| 2021 | | | | Jake Ireland | | 8.75 | 11.997 | | N/A | | |
| 2022 | Paul Hughes | Troy Lewis | Troy Lewis | Aiden Green | | | | | N/A | | |
| 2023 | Paul Hughes | | | Matthew Rizzo | | | | $3,000 | N/A | | |
| 2024 | Paul Hughes | | | Jack Lacey | Bayswater North | 9.0 | 12.34 | | N/A | | |
| 2025 | Anna Pasquali | | | Corey Wittwer-Baker | South Australia | 9.25 | 12.33 | | N/A | | |
| 2026 | | | | Tom Perry | Malvern | 9.25 | 12.33 | | N/A | | 24/01/2026 |
| Year | President | Secretary | Treasurer | Wangaratta Gift | City | Handicap | Time | Prize | Wangaratta Wheelrace | Gate | Date |

== See also ==
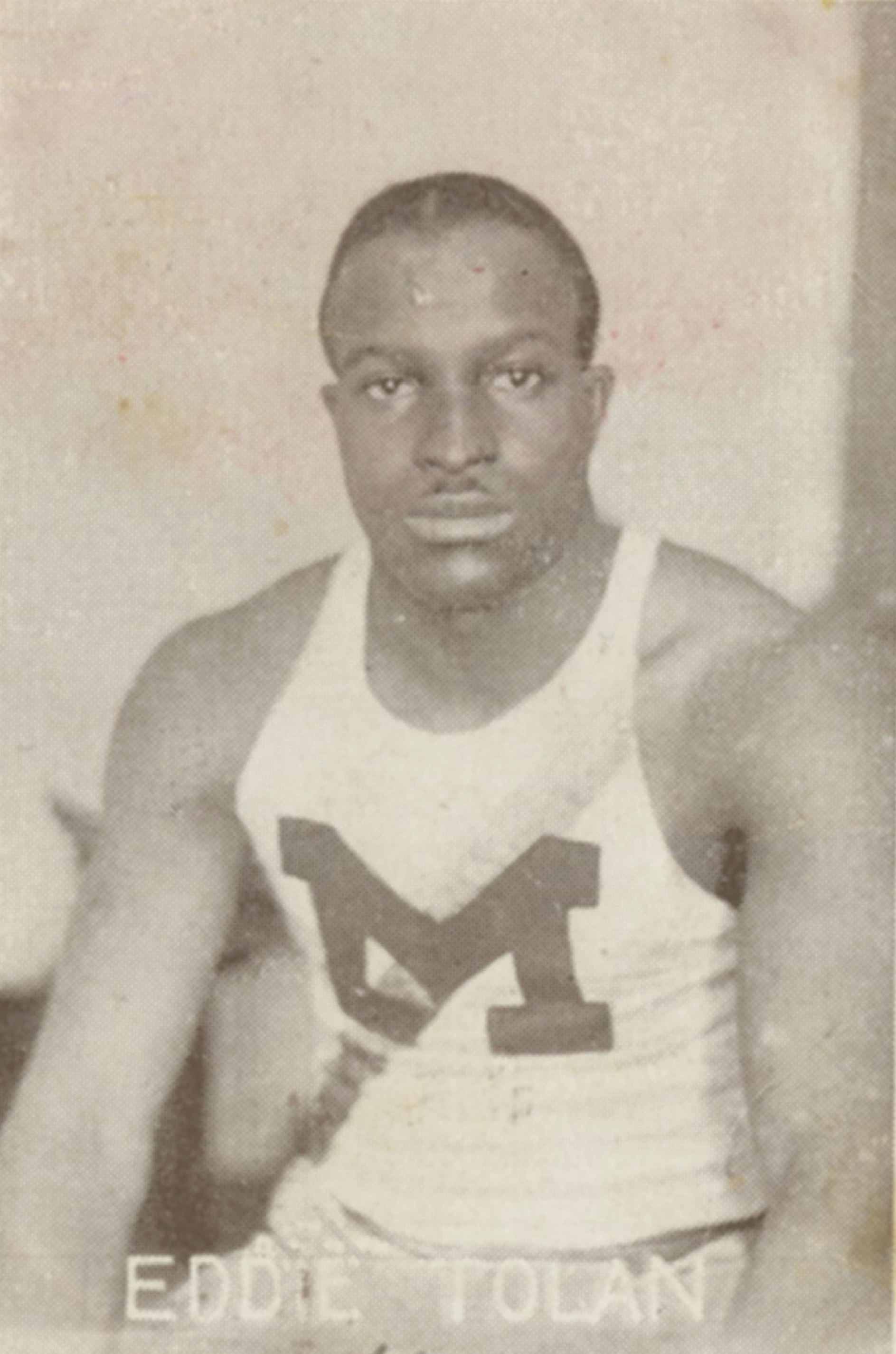
1932 Olympic 100 & 200 metre gold medallist, Eddie Tolan, ran in Wangaratta in 1935

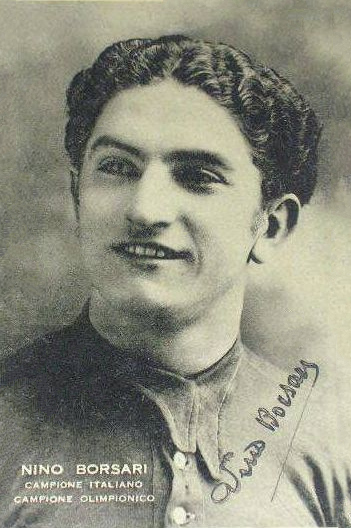
Italian Cyclist, Nino Borsari, competed in Wangaratta in 1937

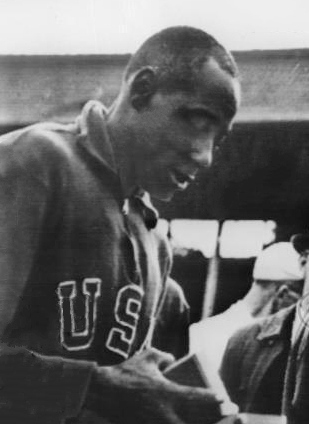
Olympic Gold & Silver medallist, Barney Ewell won the 1950 Wangaratta Gift

- List of cycling tracks and velodromes
- A history of the Wangaratta Sports Carnival. 1919 to 2021. Written by Graeme Taylor
- Stawell Gift
- New Year Sprint formerly the Powderhall Gift

== Notes ==
- 1908 (first recorded international cricket match)
- Victorian Cricket Team matches: = 1986, 1996, 2006.
