= Norm Lugg =

Australian rules footballer

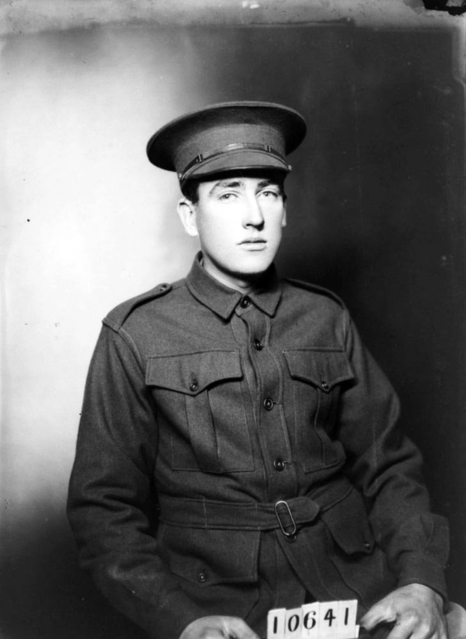

Personal information
- Full name: Norman Victor Lugg
- Born: 15 March 1898; Ararat, Victoria
- Died: 12 April 1936 (aged 38); Caulfield, Victoria
- Original team: Glenrose
- Height: 184 cm (6 ft 0 in)
- Weight: 81 kg (179 lb)

Playing career^{1}
Years	Club	Games (Goals)
1919–1920	South Melbourne	27 (10)
1921	Fitzroy	12 (6)
Total		39 (16)
- ^{1} Playing statistics correct to the end of 1921.

Norman Victor "Norm" Lugg (15 March 1898 – 12 April 1936) was an Australian rules footballer who played with South Melbourne and Fitzroy in the Victorian Football League (VFL).

== Family ==
The son of William Edward Lugg, and Mary Ann Lugg (1850–1938), née Gaskin, Norman Victor Lugg was born in Ararat, Victoria on 15 March 1898.

He married Jessie Mary Walsh in 1921.

== Military service ==
Lugg, who came from Ararat, was 17 years of age when he enlisted in June 1915, to serve with the AIF in World War I. Attached to the 4th Reinforcements of the 21st Battalion, Lugg embarked with his unit aboard the HMAT Hororata on 27 September 1915.

He was at one point known to have been recovering at a convalescent camp in Bolougne.

By the time he returned, on 19 February 1919, he was a Sapper with the 6th Field Company Engineers.

== Football career ==
=== South Melbourne ===
Soon after his return to Australia, Lugg began training with South Melbourne, who were the reigning VFL premiers. He was described by the local newspaper as being a "solid individual who kicks like a champion with either foot", while noting that he "lacks dash a little". His efforts in training were enough to earn selection for the opening round of the season.

He was a regular member of the South Melbourne team throughout the 1919 VFL season, with 17 appearances. In round 12, against St Kilda, Lugg played in a record game for South Melbourne, in which they amassed the league's highest ever fourth quarter score, 17.4 (106), as well as the highest team score, 29.15 (189). The winning margin, 171 points, stood until the 1979 season. He was mentioned in The Argus as one of the South Melbourne players to have excelled in that performance.

His best game however came in South Melbourne's semi final against Richmond. A follower, Lugg had been playing as a defender when not in the ruck, but was picked as a half forward, to fill in for the absent Harold Robertson. He kicked three goals, marked strongly and was dominant in the ruck, a performance described as the "game of his life". It wasn't enough though to prevent a 14-point loss to Richmond, which eliminated South Melbourne from the finals.

In the 1920 VFL season, Lugg played 10 games for South Melbourne. He was unable to produce his form of the previous season, but did earn selection in the Victorian team which went to Sydney to play New South Wales.

=== Fitzroy ===
Lugg, who was suffering from injuries incurred during his war service, was granted a permit to join Fitzroy early in the 1921 VFL season. He appeared in 12 games for Fitzroy, his year ending in round 17 with a three-week suspension for retaliation against Essendon player Roy Laing, who had struck him.

=== Frankston ===
Not selected for Fitzroy in 1922, Lugg left for the Nepean Football League in 1923 as the new captain-coach of Frankston. Not long into the season, Lugg had to retire from football due to illness and also resigned as coach.

=== Yeoman ===
He recovered well enough the following year to be able to accept an appointment to coach Yeoman in Tasmania's North West Football Union, a position he held for only one season.

== Death ==
Lugg died at the Caulfield Repatriation Hospital on 12 April 1936, aged 38, due to illness from injuries he had sustained in the war. He was married with three children.
