= Whorouly =

- Town
- Interactive map of Whorouly
- Coordinates: 36°30′0″S 146°35′0″E
- Country: Australia
- State: Victoria
- Region: Hume
- LGA: Rural City of Wangaratta
- Location: 274 km (170 mi) NE of Melbourne; 32.3 km (20.1 mi) SE of Wangaratta; 19.1 km (11.9 mi) NW of Myrtleford

Government
  - State electorate: Ovens Valley
  - Federal division: Indi

Population
  - Total: 383 (2021 census)
- Postcode: 3735

Whorouly is a town in northeast Victoria, Australia. Its name is possibly derived from an Aboriginal word meaning a black (or red) cockatoo, although another suggestion is that it means "underwater".

The town is in the valley of the Ovens River and in the Rural City of Wangaratta local government area, 274 kilometres (170 mi) north-east of the state capital, Melbourne and 32.3 kilometres (20.1 mi) south-east of the regional centre of Wangaratta. At the 2021 census, Whorouly and the surrounding area had a population of 383. Prior to the 1994 council amalgamations by the Kennett Government (and the creation of the Rural City of Wangaratta), the township was in the disbanded Shire of Oxley.

The town can easily be missed, being sited off the two main valley highways, between the Snow Road (the C522 which runs from an interchange on the M31 Hume Freeway) and The Great Alpine Road (B500), which runs between Wangaratta and Omeo. It is, however, only five minutes from either road.

Town facilities currently include churches, a children's playground, a sporting ground and a public hall, a combined primary school and pre-school, a combined hotel/pub/general store, a cafe and several self-catering holiday rentals and B&B's.

== History ==
The town was surveyed and proclaimed in 1868, adopting the name of a nearby station. Whorouly Primary School opened in 1874.

The first European settlers established large grazing properties but after the Victorian gold rush, closer settlement took place.

Land was released in 320-acre (130 ha) lots, on the condition that part of the land was cleared for agriculture.

Until the 1980s, much of the area along the Ovens River was planted with tobacco. Other primary products in the area included beef and dairy cattle, orchards and market gardens. In recent years, wine grape growing has been introduced meaning that the area, being at the apex of the Ovens Valley and King Valley, is the centre of a significant food region, with many farm gate and cellar door sales.

== Sports and Recreation ==
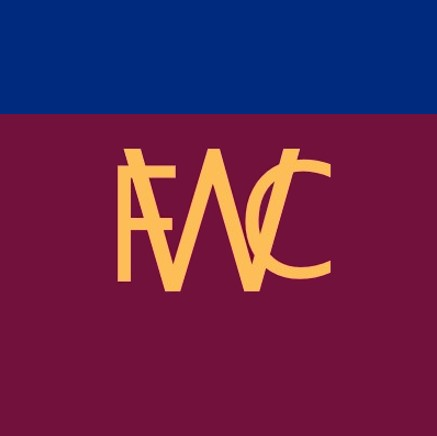
Whorouly Football Netball Club Colours

The local Australian rules football team, Whorouly Football Netball Club was established in 1892 and joined the Ovens and King Football Netball League in 1904 and our netball and football teams still play at the Whorouly Recreation Reserve, which also has eight grass tennis courts and a large community social rooms, capable of seating 200 people.

The Whorouly East Football Club joined the Bright District Football Association in 1932 and played there in 1933 too.

East Whorouly FC commenced the 1934 season in the Bright District Football Association, but then joined the Mudgegonga Football Association in late April, 1934 and then defeated Mudgegonga in the grand final and were undefeated premiers. It appears that there was no Mudegonga Football Association in 1935 and East Whorouly FC folded as a result.

The Whorouly Rovers Football Club was formed in 1936 and the team played in the Myrtleford & Bright District Football League between 1936 and 1939.

Whorouly Sports Day

The Whorouly Sports Day appears to of commenced in 1935 which involved athletics, cycling on the banked dirt bike track, equestrian and wood chopping and was held on the Whorouly Recreation Reserve. The main event was the 130 yard Sheffield Handicap Whorouly Gift and conducted under the rules of the Victorian Athletic League. During World War Two, this annual event was known as the Whorouly Patriotic Sports Day.

Whorouly Gift Winners
Year	Winner	City (from)	Handicap	Time (secs)	Comments
1935	Max Trezise	Myrtleford	12 yards		
1936	Ron Walley		12.00	13.3/5	
1937	F Stewart		7.50	11.4/5	
1938	N "Ron" Wilson	St. Kilda	10.50	12.3/10	
1939	W J Bamblett	Devenish	11.50	11.9/10	
1940	J R Stewart	Murrumbeena	14.00	12.1/2	
1941	M Fisher		10.00		
1942	D Mackay				120 yards
1943	Frank Seymour	Wangaratta	8.00		120 yards
1944	?				
1945	?				
1946	H P Arnall	Wangaratta	12.00	9.3/5	(100 yards)
1947	1st: M T Lewis*	Wangaratta	10.75	12.8/10	
	2nd: G N Grose	Ovens	8.75		
1948	Eric Cumming	Acheron Valley	3.25	12.4/10	
1949	John A Dunn	Gooramada	10.50	12.2/10	
1950	Stuart A Ross	Flemington	7.25	12.2/10	
1951	Eric Cumming	Acheron Valley	4.75	11.9/10	
1952	Doug Smith	Richmond	9.25	12.00	
1953	Alf E Bolt	Creswick	6.50	12.3/10	
1954	Tom P Hishon	Wagga Wagga	8.00	12.4	
1955	Gerald R Hutchinson	Cheltenham	2.25	11.9	
1956	Stuart Strong	Albury	6.00	11.9	
1957	Ken W Purvis	Wangaratta		12.3	
1958	Ken W Purvis	St. Kilda		12.2	
