= Eldridge Eatman =

Canadian sprinter and First World War veteran

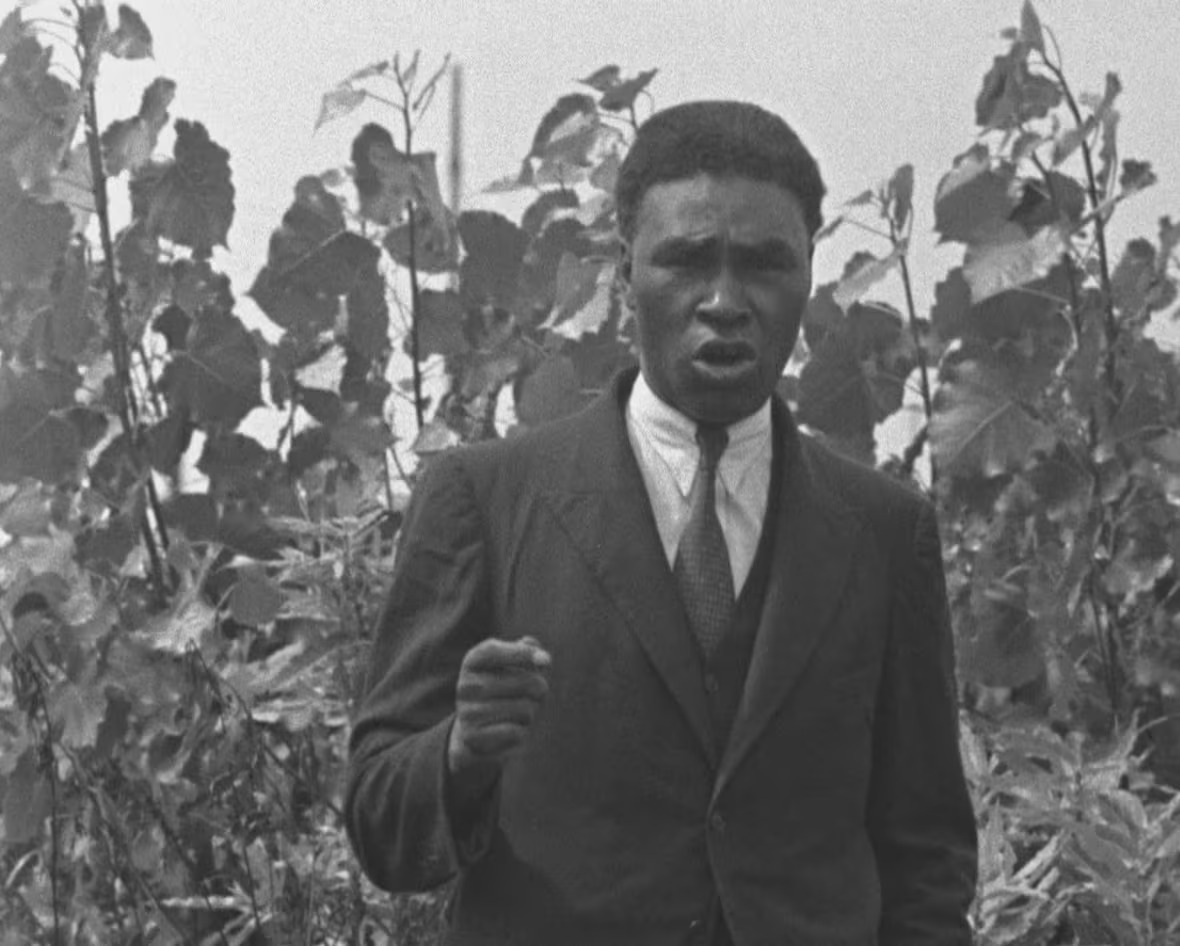
- Eatman calling for Canadian volunteers to help Ethiopia in the Second Italo-Ethiopian War (August 1935)
- Born: March 12, 1880; Zealand Station, New Brunswick
- Died: August 15, 1960 (aged 80); Saint John, New Brunswick
- Occupations: Sprinter, soldier

Eldridge "Gus" Eatman (March 12, 1880 – August 15, 1960) was a Black Canadian sprinter and First World War veteran born in Zealand Station, now known as Zealand, in the province of New Brunswick and lived most of his life in Saint John, where he moved at a young age. During his career as a sprinter, Eatman challenged colour barriers and set multiple records in the early 1900's. In 1906, he was the recipient of the Powderhall Trophy.

Following his death, he has been inducted in the Saint John Sports Hall of Fame, the New Brunswick Sports Hall of Fame, as well as the Maritime Sports Hall of Fame.

== Early life and career ==
Eldrige Eatman was born on March 12, 1880 in Zealand Station (now Zealand), a small village located northwest of Fredericton in New Brunswick, Canada, to parents John L. and Jane (née Diamond) Eatman. At a young age, Eatman's family relocated to Saint John, where he grew up and lived most of his life.

During his childhood, Eatman participated in picnic races around Saint John, where his speed garnered him local fame. However, due to his family being poor, he was prevented from competing in many races due to not being able to afford running shoes. He referred to himself as a "barefooted scudder" during this time. Additionally, Canadian amateur sports often excluded Black athletes, leading Eatman to engage in unsanctioned foot races at the park.

Sports promoter Hazen Campbell noticed Eatman's abilities and took him under his wing in 1902, providing him with a professional trainer. With Campbell's guidance, Eatman received coaching and opportunities to compete in sanctioned races. He became one of the pioneers challenging the colour barriers in track and field events, as he competed during a time when Black athletes faced obstacles in participating in amateur events, with only a few becoming professionals.

Eatman primarily competed for prize money and once expressed his preference for it, stating, "Medals are all right, but you can't buy running shoes with them or eat them." During his sprinting career, Eatman also faced racism, as winning races earned him praise while losing subjected him to racial slurs.

== Professional career ==
In 1902, Eatman achieved his inaugural official victory at the Shamrock Field in Saint John, where he completed a 125-yard race against Canadian future baseball player Tip O'Neill. During the same year on October 16, he triumphed over Ed Hobbs, an American champion, in another 125-yard race. Eatman also faced defeat against Thomas F. Keen, a world champion sprinter from the United States, who also later became a U.S. Olympic coach.

In 1903, Eatman's first well-known victory occurred when he then defeated Keen during a 120-yard sprint at Moothpath, now known as Exhibition Park, located in Saint John. In the same year, during October, Eatman competed in two races against James W. Humphrey, also known as Jimmy Humphrey, who was considered to be the first Canadian to complete the 100-yard dash in 10 seconds. While Eatman initially lost the first race due to a false start, he emerged victorious in the rematch.

In the subsequent years, Eatman consistently competed against top runners from both Canada and the United States. In 1905, at the Maritime Championships, he set a record for the fastest 100-yard sprint by a Canadian, completing it in 9.8 seconds. In 1906, Eatman received the Powderhall Trophy, which was equivalent to the world championship at the time, in Edinburgh, Scotland. He was recognized as a professional world champion sprinter from 1904 to 1908.

Outside of sprinting, Eatman befriended other Black athletes, including boxer Jack Johnson. Together, they toured the British Isles, where Eatman helped to raise funds for Johnson's trip to Australia to compete for the world heavyweight title on Boxing Day, 1908.

Eatman made multiple trips to the United Kingdom between 1902 and 1924, where he participated in races against British runners such as George Wallace and William Growcott, Arthur Postle of Australia, and Bert Day of Ireland. Eatman won some of these races and lost others. Additionally, Eatman, according to census records, lived in England for a few years.

Throughout his career, Eatman, by 1914, set records for completing 60 yards in 6.1 seconds, and 100 yards in 9.4 seconds. He once challenged anyone willing to compete against him in races ranging from 60 to 280 yards. Eatman has also been rumored to have surpassed a 120-yard race against a thoroughbred racehorse. On one occasion, he wagered his entire fortune of 130 pounds sterling on himself in a 130-yard race and won.

=== Military service ===
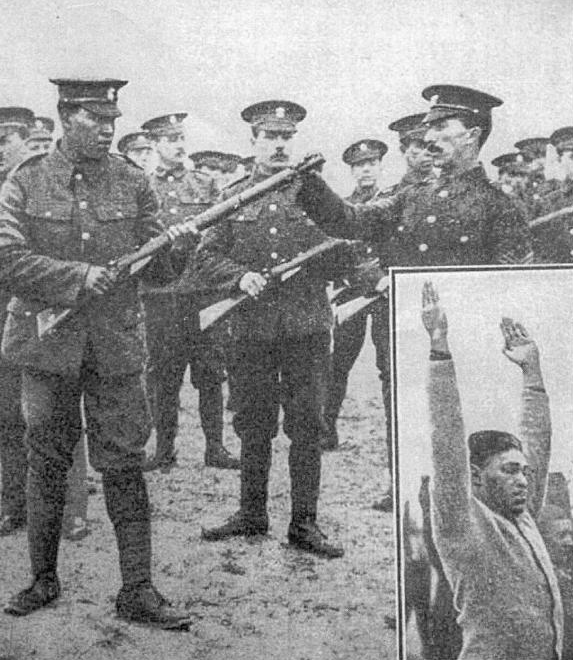
Eatman (left and inset) joining the British Army during the First World War

Eatman was in New Brunswick when the First World War broke out. Following his sprinting career, Eatman halted his career in 1915 when he tried to volunteer for the Canadian Army. However, due to the Canadian Army turning away Black Canadians from volunteering, Eatman went to England to enlist in the British Army. There, he served with the Northumberland Fusiliers, serving as an infantryman.

During his time in the war, he spent over two years, 785 days to be exact, in the trenches. On April 17, 1915, while in training, he participated in a sports event at Tynemouth, an Inter-Battalion, Inter-Company Cross Country Run. On June 8, 1915, Eatman arrived in France, which is where he would later be wounded in the leg, during the Battle of Loos. He was also promoted to corporal, and he was discharged on June 26, 1918.

== Life after war ==
Following the war, Eatman delved into entertainment while incorporating elements of athletics into it, as indicated by his "the sprinting songster" nickname during his time as a singer while touring with musical tropes. Additionally, Eatman formed connections with other notable sporting figures including Jack Johnson, Joe Louis, and Jesse Owens, and claimed to have been friends with Michael Collins.

In 1935, Eatman, under the name Eastman, participated in a fundraising campaign and called for volunteers in opposition to the invasion of Ethiopia by the army led by Italian dictator Benito Mussolini. He joined forces with global Black communities in rallying support for Ethiopia and Emperor Haile Selassie. While receiving support from Black communities in Ontario, his efforts did not result in the deployment of a Canadian Foreign Legion to the country.

In 1937, Eatman played a role in the organization of a marathon spanning New Brunswick and Nova Scotia. It was inspired by the renowned American marathon called the "Bunion Derby," which took place a decade earlier, stretching from Los Angeles to New York City. However, the race never materialized.

== Personal life and death ==
Eatman was never married. His later years were spent in Saint John, where he had lived for the majority of his life. On the morning of August 15, 1960, while waiting for a bus, he collapsed and died, at the age of 80, on the street due to a seizure. His burial took place at the Cedar Hill Extension Cemetery two days later, on August 17.

=== Legacy ===
Eatman has been recognized as one of the early 20th century's greatest sprinters. In 2002, he was inducted in the Saint John Sports Hall of Fame, followed by the New Brunswick Sports Hall of Fame in 2016, as well as the Maritime Sports Hall of Fame in 2019. In 2021, the Saint John Theatre Company presented We Were Here, a play depicting Eatman's life events. Additionally, in 2023, Eatman was to be honored in a ceremony at the Canadian Indoor Track & Field Championships, hosted by Athletics Canada and the Saint John Reds Track & Field Club in the Irving Oil Field House in Saint John.
