= Rufus Naylor =

Australian entrepreneur and gambler

Rupert Theodore "Rufus" Naylor (14 August 1882 – 25 September 1939) was an Australian sporting entrepreneur and gambler.

Naylor was born at Chippendale in Sydney to labourer Henry John Naylor and Susannah, née Phillips. He was educated at West Wyalong and left school at the age of twelve to work as a miner. By the time he was seventeen he was a licensed bookmaker, moving to the Western Australian goldfields in 1906. He travelled to South Africa in 1908 with a number of athletes and in 1909 organised a Johannesburg event between Jack Donaldson, Arthur Postle and Charles Holway; his business expanded to include a stadium and a cinema chain. From 1913 to 1917 he was in London managing African Theatres Trust Ltd. He subsequently returned to South Africa to run a weekly newspaper, Life, Sports and Drama (LSD) and expanded his business to Portuguese East Africa. He was elected to Johannesburg Municipal Council in 1919 and was acquitted of bribery accusations later that year.

Naylor sojourned in India before returning to Sydney in 1925. He continued his sporting and gambling interests until 1930, when he ran a scam to sell "shares" in lottery tickets. Having left the industry he began publishing Racing Reflections and broadcast "Racing Revelations" on the radio station 2KY. He ran unsuccessfully as an independent candidate for the seat of Lang in the 1934 federal election and was banned from registered racecourses later that year having allegedly given false information to the Australian Jockey Club's committee. He successfully challenged the ruling in the Supreme Court but the Jockey Club appealed to the Privy Council to have their ban upheld. Naylor's battle against the establishment made him a minor hero among the working classes. He died at his home on Centennial Park in 1939, and left his body for research to Sydney Hospital.
