= Charles Holway =

American sprinter (1885–1975)

Charles E. Holway (19 April 1885 – November 1975) was an American sprinter.

At his peak at the beginning of the twentieth century, following his defeat of champion Australians Jack Donaldson and Arthur Postle, Holway was considered a world champion sprinter.

He was born in Attleboro, Massachusetts, and took to running at an early age. He became a professional in 1905, defeating a number of runners in the United States before travelling to England and Wales in 1908. In the latter, he won a national competition in Pontypridd. He took part in the World Sprint Championship in 1911, and his defeat of Postle later in his career was the first time the latter had ever been defeated.

Holway was the backmarker at the famous 130 yards Powderhall Gift in Edinburgh, Scotland in 1910, 1911 and 1912.

Described as "big chested" and "very heavy limbed", Holway's stride while ready in his starting position covered a distance of over 8 feet (2.4 m).
