= Gary Parkes =

Australian rules footballer

Personal information
- Full name: Gary Parkes
- Born: 2 July 1951 (age 75)
- Original team: Pascoe Vale
- Height: 187 cm (6 ft 2 in)
- Weight: 81 kg (179 lb)
- Position: Wing

Playing career^{1}
Years	Club	Games (Goals)
1970–76	Essendon	96 (39)
1978–79	Richmond	7 (6)
1981-84	Werribee	62 (28)
Total		165 (73)
- ^{1} Playing statistics correct to the end of 1979.

Career highlights
- 1978 - Wangaratta Gift; 1983 - Werribee best & fairest; 1983 - VFA Representative side

Gary Parkes (born 2 July 1951) is a former Australian rules footballer who played with Essendon and Richmond in the Victorian Football League (VFL).

Parkes won the 1978 - 120 metre Wangaratta Gift at the Wangaratta Showgrounds.
