= New Year Sprint =

Scottish handicap sprint race

- Date: New Year's Day
- Location: Grangemouth Sports Stadium
- Event type: Handicap sprint race
- Distance: 110 metres
- Established: 1870
- Course records: 11.5 seconds
- Website: New Year Sprint: Facebook
- Participants: Amateur & professional athletes

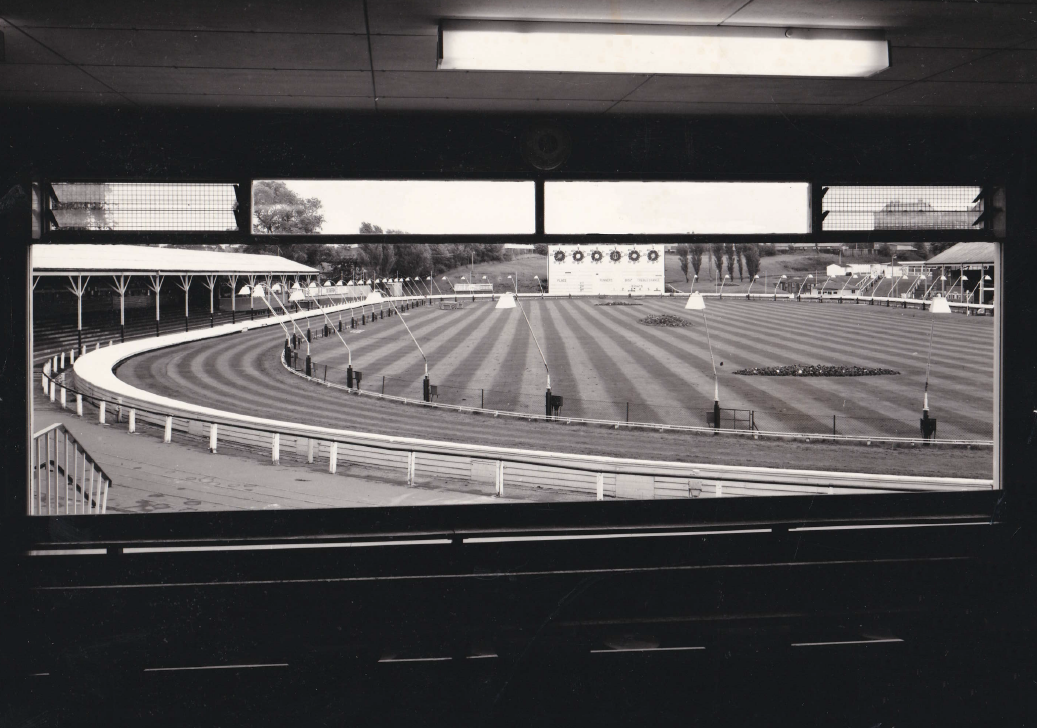
Powderhall Stadium, Edinburgh, 1970

The New Year Sprint (formerly known as the Powderhall Sprint) is a handicap sprint race for professional and amateur athletes that takes place each year in Edinburgh, Scotland. The sprint race is one of the original events of this type in the world, tracing its history back to 1870 and has been held continuously since 1870.

== Origins ==
The race was originally called the Powderhall Sprint after the district of Edinburgh where it first took place. The Powderhall Sprint was one of a circuit of professional handicap sprint races that prospered in the late nineteenth century in the United Kingdom. The handicap system meant the highly rated runners ran longer distance than less rated runners – the handicap being determined by previous results. Those runners that had to run the full distance, the most highly rated, were running from 'scratch'.

Betting surrounded all the professional races and they were often shrouded in allegations of fraud to ensure a winner favourable to the bookmakers.

The Powderhall Sprint has been run uninterrupted, including through two world wars, since 1870, apart from a brief break in 1953 and between 1958 and 1964 when various venues in Scotland hosted the race. In 1999, the race moved to Musselburgh Racecourse.

In 1993, amateur athletes were allowed to compete for the first time without the risk of losing their amateur status.

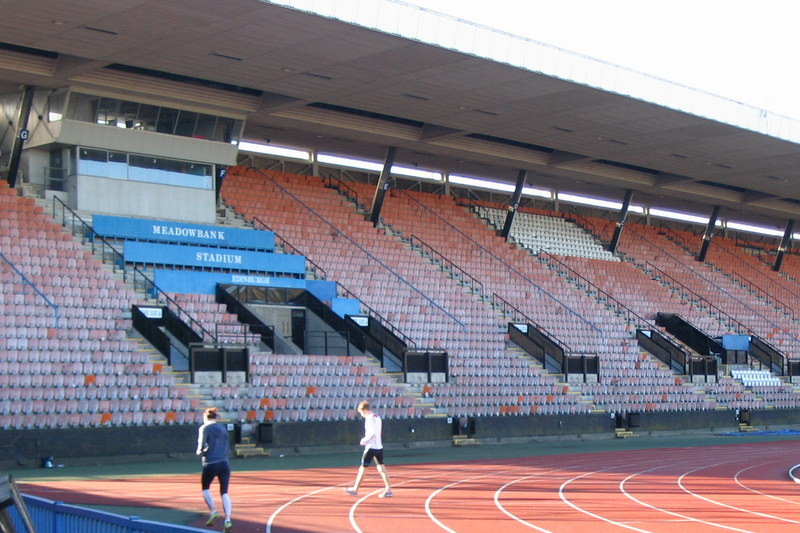
Meadowbank Stadium, Edinburgh

== Famous competitors ==
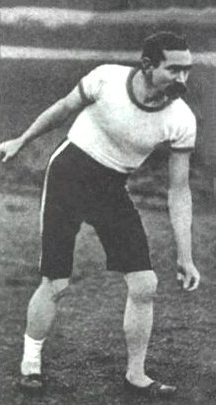
Harry Hutchens: Backmarker 11 times between 1880 & 1895

Harry Hutchens was the "scratchmarker eleven times between 1880 and 1895 and recorded a world record for 300 yards in 1884 at Powderhall off scratch in 30 seconds even time.

British Olympic medal winner Willie Applegarth was off scratch in 1915.

Willie McFarlane won the race two years in succession in 1933 and 1934, the latter from scratch- a record that still stands.

American gold medal Olympian, Barney Ewell was a competitor at Powderhall in 1950.

Geoffrey Harrington, who came from Brownhills and was off 7.5 yards, broke a 50-year-old record with a time of 11.85 seconds in the 1951 semi final, just pipping Australian runner, Eric Cumming, by an inch who was off two yards.

In the gift's centenary year of 1970, the winner was George McNeill who later won the world professional 120 yards record in 1972.

In 1983 American runner "Kipper" Bell won the 110 metre handicap event, then in 1987, the former United States collegiate 200m champion William Snoddy won.

Australian runners

During the First World War, it attracted the Australian sprinters Arthur Postle and Jack Donaldson (off scratch in 1913, 1914, 1915, 1916) and another Australian runner Cyril J Mears finished third in 1915 and was the scratchmarker in 1918 and 1919. Mears was also the backmarker in the 880 yards handicap in 1919.

Donaldson won the 300 yards Handicap event at Powderhall, off scratch in 1915.

Middle distance runner, Charlie Burgmeier was the scratchmarker in the 1916 one mile handicap and the 880 yards event in 1918.

Some other Australian runners who competed in the Powderhall Gift in the 1930's were Malcom J Dunn and South Australian runner, Jim Hennessey trained for three months prior to running in the 1939 Powderhall Gift, while Gordon Andrews ran at Powderhall in 1953.

In 1951, Australian runner Frank Banner prepared for the Powderhall Gift for eight weeks at Gorebridge, prior to the event. Banner was off one and a half yards and fellow Australian runner, Eric Cumming was off two yards, with Cumming just beaten by an inch in the semi final by eventual 1951 winner, Geoff Harrington (off 7.5 yards). In 1952, the Australian sprinter Eric Cumming won the 130 yard handicap final.

== Race venue ==
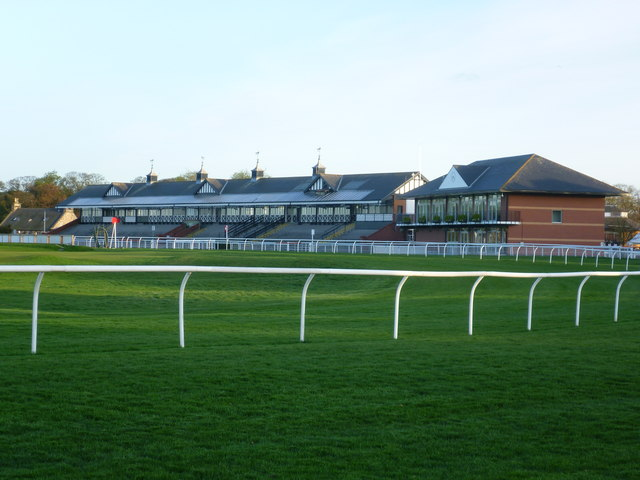
Musselburgh Racecourse

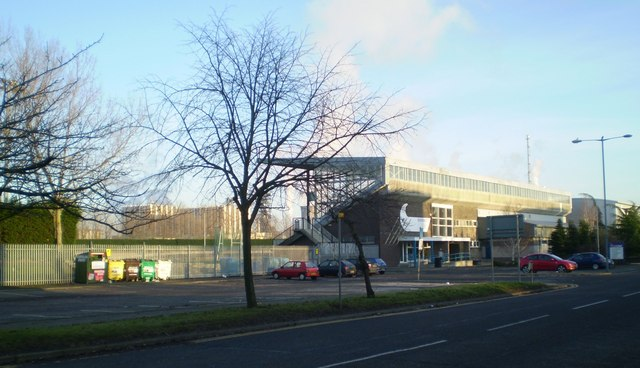
Athletic Stadium, Grangemouth

The Powderhall Sprint was so named after the district of Edinburgh, with the original venue being held on the Powderhall Grounds. The race later moved from Powderhall to the Meadowbank Stadium in Edinburgh and then onto Musselburgh Racecourse. The move, in 1971, to the Meadowbank Stadium happened after the newly opened venue had hosted the 1970 Commonwealth Games.

From 2000 to 2020 the race was run at Musselburgh Racecourse over 110 metres, and in 2013 the winner received £4,000.

The race date was moved to mid-January in 2021.

Race Venue Timeline

- 1870 - 1881: Powderhall Grounds
- 1882 - Royal Patent Gymnasium Grounds
- 1883 - 1889: Powderhall Grounds
- 1890 - 1952: New Powderhall Grounds
- 1953 - Meadowbank Grounds
- 1954 - 1957: New Powderhall Grounds
- 1958 - Buccleuch Park in Hawick
- 1959 - Tranent Sports Stadium
- 1960 - 1964: Victoria Park Stadium, Newtongrange
- 1965 - 1970: New Powderhall Grounds
- 1971 - 1999: Meadowbank Stadium
- 2000 - 2020: Musselburgh Racecourse
- 2021 - East Lothian Athletics Arena
- 2022 - Meadowbank Stadium
- 2023 - Musselburgh Racecourse
- 2024 - 2026: Grangemouth Stadium

Sprint Handicap Distance Timeline

- 1870: 160 yards
- 1871 - 1877: 150 yards
- 1878 - 1881: 130 yards
- 1882: 125 yards
- 1883 - 1917: 130 yards
- 1918 - 1919: 100 yards
- 1920 - 1940: 130 yards
- 1941 - 1945: 100 yards
- 1946 - 1952: 130 yards
- 1953: 100 yards
- 1954 - 1957: 130 yards
- 1958 - 120 yards
- 1959 - 110 yards
- 1960 - 1970: 120 yards
- 1971 - 2026: 110 metres

== Winners list ==
Winners of the Powderhall Gift, now called the New Year Sprint.

Powderhall Gift Winners
No.	Year	Winner	City (from)	Handicap (yards)	Time (seconds)	Backmarker	1st Prize/Comments
1	1870	Dan Wight	Jedburgh	12			
2	1871	T Angus &	Darlington	4.5			
		J Dickie	Leith	11.5			
3	1872	G Alexander	Edinburgh	11.5			
4	1873	A McKenzie	Edinburgh	13			
5	1874	J Grierson	Edinburgh	12			
6	1875	J Aiken	Johnston	15.5			
7	1876	F Kilgour	Edinburgh	18.75	14.00		
8	1877	F Kilgour &	Edinburgh	13.5	14&1/4		
		Dan Wight	Jedburgh	scratch	14&1/4		
9	1878	K Edwards	Edinburgh	16.25			
10	1879	J Hill	Kelso	14.5			
11	1880	J Change	Edinburgh	19.00		Harry Hutchens	
12	1881	T P Williamson	Hawick	16.00	12&1/4	Harry Hutchens	
13	1882	R Muir	Edinburgh	11.5			
14	1883	W Davies	Edinburgh	10.5			
15	1884	W Clark	Jarrow	12.5		Harry Hutchens	
16	1885	T Elliot	Sunderland	13.5		Harry Hutchens	
17	1886	T Hendry	Newscastle	14.5		Harry Hutchens	
18	1887	J Hamilton	S Queensferry	13.00			
19	1888	G Grant	Edinburgh	13.00			
20	1889	W Watson	York	13.00		Harry Hutchens	
21	1890	J Jackson	Hawick	10.00			
22	1891	J Jack	Leith	18.00		Harry Hutchens	
23	1892	W Hunter	Shettleston	9.00		Harry Hutchens	
24	1893	A Douglas	Edinburgh	15.00		Harry Hutchens	
25	1894	E Gordon	Edinburgh	16.00		Harry Hutchens	
26	1895	S Boustead	Byker	9.00		Harry Hutchens	
27	1896	J Cowan	Jamestown	12.50			
28	1897	W Russell	Biggar	13.50			
29	1898	G Duncan	Langholm	10.50			
30	1899	D Roberts	Leith	16.00			
31	1900	E Nener	Wavertree	6.50			
32	1901	D Roberts	Leith	6.50			
33	1902	B R Day	Glasgow	10.00			
34	1903	J Garside	Edinburgh	13.00			
35	1904	J Muir	Leith	14.00			
36	1905	J Innes	Porsoy	12.50			
37	1906	W Maguire	Edinburgh	15.50			
38	1907	R Raisbeck	Edinburgh	12.50			
39	1908	G Walker	Cupar	11.00			
40	1909	S Stewart	Leith	15.00			
41	1910	R Riach	Ratho	13.50		Charles Holway	
42	1911	J Paris	Edinburgh	15.00		Charles Holway	
43	1912	F Donaldson	Broughton	15.00		Charles Holway	
44	1913	M Hendry	Jedburgh	11.00	11&13/16	Jack Donaldson	
45	1914	W Haddock	Stockton	10.5	12&14/16	Jack Donaldson	
46	1915	W R Stevens	Glasgow	12.50	12&2/5	Jack Donaldson	£100
47	1916	R Thompson	Ferryhill	11.50	12&2/16	Jack Donaldson	
48	1917	R Brunton	Edinburgh	15.00	12&1/2	Pat Davies &	
			Edinburgh			Broughty-Ferry	
49	1918	T Brandon	Edinburgh	12.5	9&15&1/2/16	Cyril J Mears	Brandon: 45 yo
50	1919	J Edwards	Edinburgh	7.50	10&2/16	Cyril J Mears	
51	1920	T Eatock	INCE	10.00			
52	1921	J Pentland	Edinburgh	11.50			
53	1922	D Bell	Donibristle	11.00			
54	1923	J Riach	Ratho	15.00			
55	1924	F Best	Jarrow	14.50	11&15/16		
56	1925	N Thompson	Clathill	10.00			£120
57	1926	C J Britee	Portobello	7.50			
58	1927	G Howard	Bury	9.00			
59	1928	J Duffy	Broxburn	11.50			
60	1929	J Henshaw	Newarthill	14.00			
61	1930	A Morgan	Llangewydd	8.50			
62	1931	T Tait	Prestonpans	9.00			
63	1932	J Carl	Elswick	8.50			
64	1933	Willie McFarlane	Glasgow	7.00			£100
65	1934	Willie McFarlane	Glasgow	scratch			
66	1935	J F McPhillips	Edinburgh	8.50			
67	1936	J H Mitchell	Ashington	9.00			
68	1937	W H Scott	Galashiels	7.50			
69	1938	Jimmy Saxon	London	15.00			
70	1939	Charlie James	Edinburgh	9.50	12&7/6		
71	1940	J Gillespie	Leith	19.00			
72	1941	G Taylor	Douglas	5.50			
73	1942	C Chatburn	Chatburn	3.50			
74	1943	N Taylor	Blyth	6.00			
75	1944	J Urquart	Edinburgh				
76	1945	Richard Gordon	Edinburgh	5.50			(Sam Cain)
77	1946	A Mitchell	Ashington	5.00			
78	1947	W Spence	Blyth	5.50			
79	1948	J S Wilson	Mussellburgh	9.50			
80	1949	A McLagan	Methven	9.50			
81	1950	H Short	Asgington	7.00			
82	1951	Geoff Harrington	Brownhills	7.5	11.85		£150
83	1952	Eric Cumming	Australia	2.0	12.19		
84	1953	F Wilson	Kirkintilloch				
85	1954	F Scott	Falkirk				
86	1955	N Robertson	Perth				
87	1956	J Bryce	Alva				
88	1957	J Ball	Blyth				
89	1958	W N Atkinson	Brampton				
90	1959	F Loss	Ashington				
91	1960	A A Pow	Interleighten				
92	1961	J Lothian	Walkerburn				
93	1962	C Harrison	Bedlington				
94	1963	Ricky Dunbar	Edinburgh				
95	1964	W McLellan	East Wemyss				
96	1965	T Dickson	Hawick				
97	1966	M Murray	Barrow				
98	1967	E Cain	Carlisle				
99	1968	R Swann	Cardenden				
100	1969	D Deas	Buckhaven				
101	1970	George McNeil	Tranent	5.50 y	11.61		
102	1971	W Young	Elphinstone	6.00 m	11.10		
103	1972	R Oliver	Cowdenbeath				
104	1973	J Kirk	Lochgelly				
105	1974	P Mulgrew	Edinburgh				
106	1975	J Connor	Sunderland				
107	1976	D Burgess	Edinburgh				
108	1977	J Stirling	Ormiston				
109	1978	Roy Heron	Edinburgh	8.5	10.79		
110	1979	A Forster	Prestonpans				
111	1980	D Valentine	Edinburgh				
112	1981	Gus McQuaig	Dumbarton				
113	1982	Andrew Walker	Hawick				
114	1983	Neil Turnbull	Peebles				
115	1984	Kipper Bell	USA	2.25	10.75		
116	1985	Willie Fraser	Bonnyrigg				
117	1986	B Mulgrew	Edinburgh				
118	1987	William Snoddy	USA				
119	1988	E Smart	Whitley Bay				
120	1989	T Finkle	Jedburgh				
121	1990	J Mallin	Hawick				
122	1991	D Donald	Oakham				
123	1992	M Elliot	Hawick				
124	1993	N Sneddon	Edinburgh				
125	1994	D Barbour	Peebles				
126	1995	Doug Walker	Edinburgh AC				
127	1996	K Campbell	Edinburgh SH				
128	1997	Josephus Thomas	Woodford Green AC				
129	1998	J Cunningham	Haddington				
130	1999	Joselyn Thomas	Woodford Green AC				
131	2000	R Pitt	City of Edinburgh AC				
132	2001	Nick Smith	Dunfermline & W Fife AC				
133	2002	C Telford	Newcastle				
134	2003	D Lauder	Hawick				
135	2004	G Charlton	North Shields				
136	2005	Patrick Swan	City of Edinburgh AC				
137	2006	C Bowers	Glenrothes				
138	2007	Tony Bowman	Leeds City AC	28.50	12.12		Oldest Winner.(71)
139	2008	Craig Robertson	Gala	9.50	12.00		
140	2009	L Marshall	Hawick	8.00	11.84		
141	2010	D Paxton	Hawick	9.50	11.95		
142	2011	M Patterson	Clackmann	6.50	11.91		
143	2012	G Lister	Kirkcaldy	12.50	11.62		
144	2013	Ben Robbins	Edinburgh AC	7.50	12.14		£4,000
145	2014	D Ali	Hawick	7.50	11.59		
146	2015	Cameron Tindle	Edinburgh AC	5.00	11.97		
147	2016	Jazmine Tomlinson	TLJT	20.50	11.38		1st female winner
148	2017	Greg Kelly	East Kilbride AC	8.25	11.54		
149	2018	Callum McWilliam	East Kilbride AC	9.75	11.80		
150	2019	Greg Kelly	East Kilbride AC	5.5	11.50		
151	2020	Ian Horsburgh	Central AC	10.25	11.81		
152	2021	Molly Reville	Edinburgh AC	26.00	10.83		
153	2022	Stacey Downie	Edinburgh AC	17.00	11.15		
154	2023	Scott Tindle	TLJT	6.5	12.03		
155	2024	Ryan McMichan	Edinburgh	8.50	11.35		
156	2025	Craig Bruce	Borderer	10.00	11.74		£6,000
157	2026	Daniel Bruce	Kilbarchan AAC	9.0	11.51		£6,000
158	2027						
No.	Year	Winner	City (from)	Handicap (metres)	Time (seconds)	Backmarker	1st Prize/Comments

1871 and 1877 were dead heats.

== Links ==
- New Year Sprint: Facebook Page
- New Year Sprint: Roll of Honour & Winners List
- Powderhall & Pedestrianism: The history of the famous Sports Enclosure - 1870 to 1943. By David A. Jamieson
- Stawell Gift, Victoria, Australia. A similar race that is run in Australia.
