= Arnie Wilson =

Australian rules footballer

Personal information
- Full name: Arnold Wilson
- Born: 22 September 1885; Hastings, Sussex, England
- Died: 8 April 1971 (aged 85); Parkville, Victoria
- Original team: Melbourne Swimming Club

Playing career^{1}
| Years | Club | Games (Goals) |
| 1909–1910 | St Kilda | 2 (0) |
- ^{1} Playing statistics correct to the end of 1910.

Arnold Wilson (22 September 1885 – 8 April 1971) was an Australian rules footballer who played for the St Kilda Football Club in the Victorian Football League (VFL).

Father of former Melbourne and St Kila player, Ron Wilson.
