= Charles Samuels (athlete) =

Australian athlete

- Born: Sambo Combo; Jimbour station, southern Queensland
- Died: 13 October 1912; Barambah
- Known for: Competitive athlete
- Height: 170 cm (5 ft 7 in)

Charles Samuels (1863/1864–1912) was an Aboriginal Australian pedestrianist and competitive sprinter. As an Aboriginal Australian, he grew up in a community of Baruŋgam people (Bunyinni people). He was also acquainted with the family of Australian politician Joshua Peter Bell.

In 1887, Samuels raced and won against British celebrity runner Harry Hutchens. In that same year, he also raced against athletes Tom Malone and Ted Lazarus. According to a researcher for the State Library of Queensland, it is believed that Samuels once met the Queensland Governor, Sir William MacGregor, in 1911.

Samuels was regarded as a popular figure in Australian sport, despite having a reputation for fighting and alcoholism. However, his reputation was ruined following his arrest and commitment to the Callan Park Hospital for the Insane after being diagnosed with 'melancholia'. He died of tuberculosis in 1912. His death was reported in The Brisbane Courier.
