= Austin Robertson Sr. =

Australian rules footballer, born 1907

Personal information
- Full name: Austin Patrick Robertson
- Born: 21 November 1908; South Melbourne, Victoria
- Died: 6 May 1988 (aged 79); Cottesloe, Western Australia
- Original team: Xavier College
- Height: 180 cm (5 ft 11 in)
- Weight: 82 kg (181 lb)
- Position: centre half forward / back

Playing career^{1}
Years	Club	Games (Goals)
1927–1937	South Melbourne	154 (250)
1937	West Perth	3 (2)
1938–1939	Perth	39 (49)
1940-41, 1945	Pt Melb (VFA)	36 (94)
Total		232 (395)

Coaching career
Years	Club	Games (W–L–D)
1938-1939	Perth	40 (21/19/0)
- ^{1} Playing statistics correct to the end of 1945.

Career highlights
- 1927 - Represented VFL at National Carnival; 1929, 30 & 32: Leading goalkicker - South Melbourne; 1928 - 130 yards / £1000 Melbourne Handicap; 1929 - 2nd - World Professional Sprint Championships; 1930 - 1st - World Professional Sprint Championships; 1932 - Pakenham Gift (130 yards); 1932 - Maribyrnong 120 yards Handicap; 1933 - World record time: 140 yards / 13 & 1/10th seconds at the Wangaratta Showgrounds; 1933 - 1st - World Professional Sprint Championships; 1935 - 2nd - World Professional Sprint Championships

Austin Patrick Robertson (21 November 1908 – 6 May 1988) was an all round sportsmen who excelled in Australian rules footballer who played for the South Melbourne Football Club in the Victorian Football League (VFL) and West Perth and Perth in the Western Australian National Football League (WANFL) and was also a World Professional Sprint Champion and accomplished cricketer.

== Football career ==
Robertson was recruited via Xavier College, Melbourne where he was an outstanding competitor in athletics, cricket, Swimming and football.

Robertson debuted with South Melbourne in 1927, in round three at the age of 18 and played 16 consecutive matches in his first season in the VFL and represented Victoria in August, 1927. He was well regarded as a key position player at both ends of the ground. He was one of the few players still adept at place kicking during the 1930s, noted for the length and accuracy of his kicks; he made several official attempts over his career to break Dave McNamara's record for longest kick, often topping 70 yards but never breaking McNamara's mark of 86 yards; while an unofficial kick marked out during a match in 1941 was measured to have gone more than 90 yards.

While Robertson only played in the first two rounds in 1933, he missed out on South Melbourne's 1933 premiership win because he was in America organising a head-to-head race with Olympic Gold medalist, Eddie Tolan at the Chicago World's Fair. However, when he arrived in the United States, Tolan was not in training and was unable to race.

During the 1937 season, Robertson was transferred to Perth by his employer, General Motors-Holden. He was cleared to West Perth and played there for the rest of 1937. In 1938, he switched to Perth, and served as its playing coach for the next two years, finishing 6th in 1938 and 5th in 1939. General Motors returned Robertson to Victoria in 1940 and, despite expectations that he would return to South Melbourne, he signed with Victorian Football Association club Port Melbourne for a reported £6 per week, and crossed without a clearance from South Melbourne. He played for Port Melbourne under the VFA's throw-pass rules until 1941.

== Athletics career ==
Robertson was breaking school records in 1926 in the high jump, long jump, 100, 220 and 440 yards events.

In 1928, Robertson won the 130 yard Handicap at the Melbourne Motordrome, which carried a purse of £1000 and was witnessed by 10,000 spectators.

While at South Melbourne, he was also a world champion professional sprinter, winning the world title in 1930. Then in 1932, Robertson was unable to defend his World Sprint Champion title due to a strained leg tendon.

In February 1933 at the Wangaratta Sports Carnival, at The Showgrounds, Wangaratta Robertson broke the world record for 140 yards in a time of 13.1&1/2 / 16 seconds.

== Cricket career ==
Robertson played 23 first eleven matches with South Melbourne Cricket Club in Melbourne District Cricket Association between 1924/25 and 1933/34.

== Personal life ==
He was the youngest son of Mr and Mrs John Robertson, was educated at Xavier College Kew and married Dorothy McDonald in Elwood on 22 June 1940. His brother, Harold Robertson, and son, Austin Robertson Jr. were also champion footballers.

After Robertson left school, he studied Pharmacy at the Victorian School of Pharmacy and was articled to a chemist in Brunswick.

Robertson served in the Australian Army with the rank of Corporal during World War II, despite suffering acute blindness in one eye which should have medically disqualified him from service, and which did result in at least one failed attempt to enlist.

== See also ==
- 1927 Melbourne Carnival
