= Beauchamp Day =

Irish sprinter

Beauchamp Day was an Irish sprinter who was Ireland's championship runner in the early 1910s. He regularly competed at the Australian gold fields of Kalgoorlie; his 1906 defeat there at the hands of Arthur Postle being an event of some notoriety. On 1 April 1907 he recorded a then-world record time for the 400 metre sprint.
