= 1919 VFL season =

23rd season of the Victorian Football League (VFL)

1919 VFL premiership season
- Date: 3 May – 11 October 1919
- Teams: 9
- Premiers: Collingwood; 5th premiership
- Minor premiers: Collingwood; 6th minor premiership
- Leading goalkicker medallist: Dick Lee (Collingwood); 47 goals
- Matches played: 76

The 1919 VFL season was the 23rd season of the Victorian Football League (VFL), the highest-level senior Australian rules football competition in Victoria. For the first time since the peak of World War I, all nine clubs featured, with Melbourne returning after being in recess the previous three seasons. The season ran from 3 May to 11 October, comprising a 16-match home-and-away season followed by a four-week finals series featuring the top four clubs.

Collingwood won the premiership, defeating Richmond by 25 points in the 1919 VFL grand final; it was Collingwood's fifth VFL premiership. Collingwood also won the minor premiership by finishing atop the home-and-away ladder with a 13–3 win–loss record. Collingwood's Dick Lee won his seventh leading goalkicker medal as the league's leading goalkicker, which remains a league record to this day.

== Background ==
In 1919, the VFL competition consisted of nine teams of 18 on-the-field players each, with no "reserves", although any of the 18 players who had left the playing field for any reason could later resume their place on the field at any time during the match.

Each team played each other twice in a home-and-away season of 18 rounds (i.e., 16 matches and 2 byes).

Once the 18 round home-and-away season had finished, the 1919 VFL Premiers were determined by the specific format and conventions of the amended "Argus system".

== Home-and-away season ==
=== Round 1 ===
Home team	Home team score	Away team	Away team score	Venue	Date
Carlton	14.14 (98)	Fitzroy	8.7 (55)	Princes Park	3 May 1919
St Kilda	12.14 (86)	Melbourne	9.4 (58)	Junction Oval	3 May 1919
Richmond	12.19 (91)	Essendon	10.11 (71)	Punt Road Oval	3 May 1919
South Melbourne	6.13 (49)	Collingwood	9.8 (62)	Lake Oval	3 May 1919

=== Round 2 ===
Home team	Home team score	Away team	Away team score	Venue	Date
Melbourne	3.10 (28)	South Melbourne	10.19 (79)	MCG	10 May 1919
Geelong	7.9 (51)	Richmond	10.6 (66)	Corio Oval	10 May 1919
Collingwood	5.15 (45)	St Kilda	5.18 (48)	Victoria Park	10 May 1919
Essendon	9.11 (65)	Carlton	7.11 (53)	EMCG	10 May 1919

=== Round 3 ===
Home team	Home team score	Away team	Away team score	Venue	Date
St Kilda	4.7 (31)	South Melbourne	9.13 (67)	Junction Oval	17 May 1919
Melbourne	7.7 (49)	Richmond	11.14 (80)	MCG	17 May 1919
Fitzroy	18.10 (118)	Essendon	5.12 (42)	Brunswick Street Oval	17 May 1919
Geelong	5.2 (32)	Collingwood	5.19 (49)	Corio Oval	17 May 1919

=== Round 4 ===
Home team	Home team score	Away team	Away team score	Venue	Date
Essendon	4.9 (33)	St Kilda	7.6 (48)	EMCG	24 May 1919
Carlton	13.21 (99)	Geelong	3.4 (22)	Princes Park	24 May 1919
South Melbourne	4.15 (39)	Fitzroy	4.12 (36)	Lake Oval	24 May 1919
Richmond	8.6 (54)	Collingwood	11.8 (74)	Punt Road Oval	24 May 1919

=== Round 5 ===
Home team	Home team score	Away team	Away team score	Venue	Date
Geelong	0.18 (18)	St Kilda	6.10 (46)	Corio Oval	31 May 1919
Fitzroy	10.14 (74)	Richmond	7.6 (48)	Brunswick Street Oval	31 May 1919
Essendon	7.8 (50)	South Melbourne	9.16 (70)	EMCG	31 May 1919
Carlton	18.15 (123)	Melbourne	5.4 (34)	Princes Park	31 May 1919

=== Round 6 ===
Home team	Home team score	Away team	Away team score	Venue	Date
Richmond	7.20 (62)	South Melbourne	11.16 (82)	Punt Road Oval	7 June 1919
Collingwood	16.20 (116)	Melbourne	8.7 (55)	Victoria Park	7 June 1919
Fitzroy	7.18 (60)	Geelong	4.4 (28)	Brunswick Street Oval	9 June 1919
St Kilda	7.11 (53)	Carlton	11.9 (75)	Junction Oval	9 June 1919

=== Round 7 ===
Home team	Home team score	Away team	Away team score	Venue	Date
Carlton	9.16 (70)	Collingwood	8.11 (59)	Princes Park	14 June 1919
St Kilda	5.12 (42)	Richmond	7.9 (51)	Junction Oval	14 June 1919
Melbourne	6.6 (42)	Fitzroy	11.12 (78)	MCG	14 June 1919
Geelong	6.8 (44)	Essendon	8.8 (56)	Corio Oval	14 June 1919

=== Round 8 ===
Home team	Home team score	Away team	Away team score	Venue	Date
Fitzroy	13.14 (92)	St Kilda	7.5 (47)	Brunswick Street Oval	21 June 1919
Melbourne	7.10 (52)	Geelong	10.12 (72)	MCG	21 June 1919
Essendon	6.8 (44)	Collingwood	10.10 (70)	EMCG	21 June 1919
South Melbourne	6.13 (49)	Carlton	6.8 (44)	Lake Oval	21 June 1919

=== Round 9 ===
Home team	Home team score	Away team	Away team score	Venue	Date
Essendon	16.17 (113)	Melbourne	6.8 (44)	EMCG	28 June 1919
Collingwood	9.14 (68)	Fitzroy	10.11 (71)	Victoria Park	28 June 1919
Carlton	9.15 (69)	Richmond	14.11 (95)	Princes Park	28 June 1919
South Melbourne	5.22 (52)	Geelong	5.4 (34)	Lake Oval	28 June 1919

=== Round 10 ===
Home team	Home team score	Away team	Away team score	Venue	Date
Melbourne	5.7 (37)	St Kilda	6.11 (47)	MCG	12 July 1919
Essendon	6.10 (46)	Richmond	6.15 (51)	EMCG	12 July 1919
Collingwood	8.11 (59)	South Melbourne	3.18 (36)	Victoria Park	12 July 1919
Fitzroy	5.11 (41)	Carlton	5.9 (39)	Brunswick Street Oval	12 July 1919

=== Round 11 ===
Home team	Home team score	Away team	Away team score	Venue	Date
Carlton	7.8 (50)	Essendon	9.11 (65)	Princes Park	19 July 1919
South Melbourne	13.16 (94)	Melbourne	2.15 (27)	Lake Oval	19 July 1919
Richmond	16.15 (111)	Geelong	7.14 (56)	Punt Road Oval	19 July 1919
St Kilda	5.9 (39)	Collingwood	13.13 (91)	Junction Oval	19 July 1919

=== Round 12 ===
Home team	Home team score	Away team	Away team score	Venue	Date
Essendon	9.13 (67)	Fitzroy	8.8 (56)	EMCG	26 July 1919
Collingwood	12.11 (83)	Geelong	4.7 (31)	Victoria Park	26 July 1919
South Melbourne	29.15 (189)	St Kilda	2.6 (18)	Lake Oval	26 July 1919
Richmond	9.18 (72)	Melbourne	7.6 (48)	Punt Road Oval	26 July 1919

=== Round 13 ===
Home team	Home team score	Away team	Away team score	Venue	Date
Fitzroy	7.5 (47)	South Melbourne	14.10 (94)	Brunswick Street Oval	9 August 1919
Collingwood	11.12 (78)	Richmond	9.11 (65)	Victoria Park	9 August 1919
St Kilda	6.10 (46)	Essendon	4.10 (34)	Junction Oval	9 August 1919
Geelong	8.11 (59)	Carlton	12.22 (94)	Corio Oval	9 August 1919

=== Round 14 ===
Home team	Home team score	Away team	Away team score	Venue	Date
St Kilda	12.18 (90)	Geelong	10.17 (77)	Junction Oval	16 August 1919
Richmond	6.21 (57)	Fitzroy	3.13 (31)	Punt Road Oval	16 August 1919
South Melbourne	12.15 (87)	Essendon	8.7 (55)	Lake Oval	16 August 1919
Melbourne	5.6 (36)	Carlton	13.18 (96)	MCG	16 August 1919

=== Round 15 ===
Home team	Home team score	Away team	Away team score	Venue	Date
Carlton	10.14 (74)	St Kilda	9.4 (58)	Princes Park	23 August 1919
South Melbourne	6.7 (43)	Richmond	4.14 (38)	Lake Oval	23 August 1919
Geelong	11.9 (75)	Fitzroy	11.9 (75)	Corio Oval	23 August 1919
Melbourne	5.6 (36)	Collingwood	20.25 (145)	MCG	23 August 1919

=== Round 16 ===
Home team	Home team score	Away team	Away team score	Venue	Date
Richmond	14.16 (100)	St Kilda	5.11 (41)	Punt Road Oval	30 August 1919
Fitzroy	21.16 (142)	Melbourne	2.5 (17)	Brunswick Street Oval	30 August 1919
Essendon	9.18 (72)	Geelong	6.13 (49)	EMCG	30 August 1919
Collingwood	17.11 (113)	Carlton	5.16 (46)	Victoria Park	30 August 1919

=== Round 17 ===
Home team	Home team score	Away team	Away team score	Venue	Date
Geelong	14.12 (96)	Melbourne	6.15 (51)	Corio Oval	6 September 1919
Collingwood	9.13 (67)	Essendon	5.14 (44)	Victoria Park	6 September 1919
Carlton	8.11 (59)	South Melbourne	8.7 (55)	Princes Park	6 September 1919
St Kilda	3.14 (32)	Fitzroy	7.10 (52)	Junction Oval	6 September 1919

=== Round 18 ===
Home team	Home team score	Away team	Away team score	Venue	Date
Geelong	6.14 (50)	South Melbourne	3.8 (26)	Corio Oval	13 September 1919
Melbourne	4.9 (33)	Essendon	10.7 (67)	MCG	13 September 1919
Fitzroy	6.10 (46)	Collingwood	9.10 (64)	Brunswick Street Oval	13 September 1919
Richmond	5.12 (42)	Carlton	7.19 (61)	Punt Road Oval	13 September 1919

== Ladder ==
(P)	Premiers
	Qualified for finals

#	Team	P	W	L	D	PF	PA	%	Pts
1	Collingwood (P)	16	13	3	0	1243	766	162.3	52
2	South Melbourne	16	12	4	0	1111	700	158.7	48
3	Carlton	16	10	6	0	1150	901	127.6	40
4	Richmond	16	10	6	0	1083	916	118.2	40
5	Fitzroy	16	9	6	1	1074	857	125.3	38
6	Essendon	16	7	9	0	924	977	94.6	28
7	St Kilda	16	7	9	0	772	1093	70.6	28
8	Geelong	16	3	12	1	794	1082	73.4	14
9	Melbourne	16	0	16	0	647	1506	43.0	0

Rules for classification: 1. premiership points; 2. percentage; 3. points for
Average score: 61.1
Source: AFL Tables

== Finals series ==
All of the 1919 finals were played at the MCG so the home team in the semi-finals and Preliminary Final is purely the higher ranked team from the ladder but in the Grand Final the home team was the team that won the Preliminary Final.

=== Semi-finals ===
Home team	Score	Away team	Score	Venue	Date
Richmond	10.13 (73)	South Melbourne	9.5 (59)	MCG	20 September
Collingwood	9.10 (64)	Carlton	6.10 (46)	MCG	27 September

=== Preliminary final ===
Home team	Score	Away team	Score	Venue	Date
Richmond	10.14 (74)	Collingwood	6.9 (45)	MCG	4 October

=== Grand final ===
Team	1 Qtr	2 Qtr	3 Qtr	Final
Collingwood	1.5	5.5	8.8	11.12 (78)
Richmond	1.2	4.7	5.10	7.11 (53)

== Season notes ==
- Melbourne returned to the VFL competition, and also changed its constitution so that direct payments (i.e., other than reimbursement of expenses) could be made to players, thus making the team professional, eight years after the VFL had officially done so.
- Since the nine-team competition required one bye each week, the VFL sought expressions of interest from clubs wishing to join the VFL. Whilst there was talk of an Ex-Servicemen's Club and a Public Servants' Club, an application was actually lodged on behalf of a combined Ballarat Football League team, as well as on behalf of the VFA clubs Brunswick, Footscray, Hawthorn, North Melbourne, Port Melbourne, and Prahran.
- The VFL introduced a Second Eighteen competition between its constituent clubs, known as the Victorian Junior Football League.
- At the start of the 1919 season, the VFL had already donated £9,436-0-0 to the Patriotic Fund since the start of the war.
- In its Round 12 match against St Kilda, South Melbourne set the record for highest score in a quarter, kicking 17.4 (106) in the last quarter of the match. This remains the record, and is a full two goals better than any other team has managed, as of 2023. South's record score was helped by St Kilda only having 15 fit players at the start of the quarter, followed up by several Saints players walking off in the course of the last quarter.
  - Other records which have since been broken were set in that same match: South Melbourne full-forward Harold Robertson kicked 14 goals in the match (a record until 1929); South Melbourne kicked a match score of 29.15 (189) (a record until 1931), and a winning margin of 171 points (a record until 1979).
- In Round 16, Collingwood defeated Carlton 17.11 (113) to 5.16 (46). No team had scored 100 points against Carlton since round 1, 1904, a streak of 292 consecutive matches, which remains a VFL/AFL record as of 2023.
- St Kilda's win at Collingwood in Round 2 was its first ever win over Collingwood on the road after a winless streak of 24 matches at Victoria Park (20 in the VFL and four in the VFA).
- Collingwood only used 26 players to win the premiership, a feat they would repeat in 1929.

== Awards ==
- The 1919 VFL Premiership team was Collingwood.
- The VFL's leading goalkicker was Dick Lee of Collingwood with 56 goals.
- Melbourne took the "wooden spoon" in 1919.
- The Victorian Junior League premiership, which is today recognised as the inaugural VFL reserves premiership, was won by Collingwood's team, Collingwood District. Collingwood District 6.11 (47) defeated University A 4.8 (32) in a challenge Grand Final, played as a curtain-raiser to the senior Grand Final on 11 October at the Melbourne Cricket Ground.

== Sources ==
- 1919 VFL season at AFL Tables
- 1919 VFL season at Australian Football
