= Harold Robertson =

Australian rules footballer (1895–1935)

Personal information
- Full name: Harold John Robertson
- Nickname: Diddlo
- Born: 9 April 1895; Kensington Hill, Victoria
- Died: 19 March 1935 (aged 39); Albert Park, Victoria
- Original team: Middle Park CYMS (CYMSFA)
- Height: 173 cm (5 ft 8 in)
- Weight: 67 kg (148 lb)

Playing career^{1}
Years	Club	Games (Goals)
1917–1921, 1923	South Melbourne	64 (93)
- ^{1} Playing statistics correct to the end of 1923.

Harold John Robertson (9 April 1895 – 19 March 1935) was an Australian rules footballer who played for South Melbourne in the VFL.

== Family ==
The second child, and eldest son of John Christian "Chris" Robertson (1868–1949), and Mary Robertson (1872–1954), née Reardon, Harold John Robertson was born at Kensington Hill, Victoria on 9 April 1895.

He married Rebecca Mary Shaw (1896–1967) (later Mrs. Patrick Corbett) at Middle Park, Victoria, on 21 April 1920.

His brother, Austin Robertson, Sr., and his nephew, Austin Robertson, Jr., were also champion footballers. Another brother, Hans Joseph Robertson (1905–1969), was a champion amateur swimmer.

== Football ==
=== South Melbourne (VFL) ===
Full-forward Harold Robertson kicked 38 goals in 1919, which was enough to top South Melbourne's goalkicking.

Robertson played in South Melbourne's 1918 premiership team, kicking two goals from a half forward flank in their five-point victory — 9.8 (62) to 7.15 (57) — over Collingwood in the 1918 VFL Grand Final.

==== 26 July 1919 ====
He set a VFL record in the match against St Kilda, at the Lake Oval, on 26 July 1919 when he kicked 14 goals, half of them in the final quarter. It easily beat the previous league record of 11 goals shared by Dick Lee and Jim McShane. Robertson's VFL record was not bettered until Gordon Coventry kicked 16 goals against Hawthorn, at Victoria Park, on 27 July 1929.

Robertson's 14 goals was the first time that a South Melbourne player had kicked 10 or more goals in a match. It was not until 1933 that his feat was equalled, with Bob Pratt kicking 10 goals twice — 10 goals on 8 July 1933 and 11 goals on 15 July 1933 — and, then, setting a new record with his kicking 15 goals against Essendon, at the Lake Oval, on 19 May 1934.

== Swimming ==
In his youth, Harold, like his younger brother Hans, was an accomplished swimmer.

== Death ==
Following his retirement from football, he suffered with illness over a long period of time, and died at Albert Park, Victoria, on 19 March 1935, at the age of 39.
