= Harry Hutchens =

British runner (1858–1939)

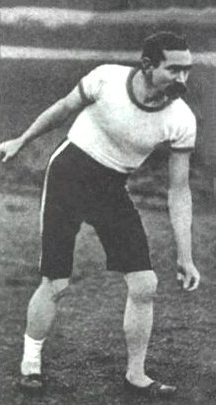
- Harry Hutchens in 1885

Personal information
- Born: 27 February 1858 Putney, United Kingdom
- Died: 2 January 1939 (aged 80) Catford, United Kingdom
- Height: 5 ft 11 in (1.80 m)
- Weight: 177 lb (80 kg)

Sport
- Sport: Athletics
- Event: 100–350 yd

Harry Hutchens (born Henry Hutchins, 27 February 1858 – 2 January 1939) was a professional British runner. Hutchens became a messenger at Putney railway station at 14 and soon discovered he was a fast runner. He became a professional in 1876. Hutchens died poor and in obscurity in 1939 but received an obituary from The New York Times.

== Athletic career ==
In 1920, American Olympic champion and writer Ellery Harding Clark declared that Harry Hutchens was "the greatest sprinter the world had ever seen." Hutchens is regarded by many observers as the greatest sprinter of the 19th century. Hutchens always ran from a standing start and set nine professional world records in all. His New York Times obituary claimed that he went unbeaten for 15 years.

Hutchens ran 131.25 yards (120 m) in 12.2 seconds at the Sheffield Handicap in 1882 (the equivalent of 10.3 for 100 m). He was timed at 9.75 seconds for 100y in 1887. Hutchens ran 140 yards in 13.5 seconds in 1885. He ran 150 yards in 14.5 seconds in 1887. In 1885 he ran 350 yards (320 m) in 38.4 seconds.

On 2 January 1884, Hutchens clocked 30.0 seconds for 300 yards (274 m) on the grass track at the Powderhall meet in Edinburgh, easing up. Doug Walker, the 1998 European 200 metre champion and European record holder for 300 metres, tried to beat Hutchen's time in 1999. He also ran in January in Edinburgh but only managed to run 30.05 seconds. After the race, Walker said "It was an amazing run, absolutely amazing. Apparently he (Hutchens) had his hands in the air, celebrating, from 30 yards out. Some runner." According to Edward Seldon Sears, Hutchens ran a time-trial in 29.5 seconds before the Powderhall race.

In 1887 Hutchens ran against the Aboriginal athlete Charles Samuels. In that same year Hutchens was due to compete in "The Race of the Century", as the newspapers of the day billed the 120 yards world championship race between himself and Harry Gent. Gent had emerged as a rival after running the equivalent of 9.7 for 100 yards to win the Sheffield Handicap. The Lillie Bridge stadium in London was packed with 15,000 spectators. The race did not take place because the bookmakers feared they would lose money. They discovered that Gent had secretly broken down in training. The two runners were bundled out of a side-entrance. "They stood over me in the dressing-room with open knives and bottles," Hutchens told The Sporting Life. "They swore they would murder me if I tried to run." When their non-appearance was announced, the crowd set fire to the stadium. This prompted the demise of pedestrianism, as the popular sport of racing for prize money was known in its 19th-century heyday.

== Contemporary views on Hutchens ==
As a professional sprinter Hutchens often tried to conceal his form, from bookmakers as well as handicappers. He rarely ran flat-out.

British runner Charles Wood (1861–1937) set a world amateur record for 220 yards at 21.6 in 1887. Wood told the Otago Witness in 1905 that “I consider that Harry Hutchens of Putney was the best sprinter of all time. Only men who could run and had run with Hutchens could understand what a marvel he was. I have been doing 10.2 for 100 yards but when running with Hutchens I am lost altogether. He could do 9.5 easily, and could smother L.E. Myers in the quarter-mile.

Lon Myers held the American record for 100 yards at 10.0 seconds and was U.S. champion twice. Myers sometimes trained with Hutchens and in his biography, claimed that Hutchens was at least 6 yards faster over 100 yards, which would indicate he could run 9.4 seconds for 100 yards. James S. Mitchel claimed in 1901 in his book Athletics Giants of the Past that some observers thought Hutchens could run 9.2 seconds. Hutchens and Reggie Walker, the 1908 Olympic 100 metres champion shared a coach in Sam Wisdom. Walker in 1910 described Hutchens as the "greatest phenomenal sprinter of all time."

Sam Mussabini (1867–1927) coached the 1924 Olympic 100 metres champion Harold Abrahams. As a sprinter, he described Hutchens "as the most brilliant of all time." He believed that Hutchens was capable of running 29 seconds for 300 yards if he had specially trained for the event.

Guy Butler won a gold medal in the 4 × 400 m relay at the 1920 Summer Olympics. He also won Olympic silver and bronze medals in the individual 400 metres in 1920 and 1924. Butler set an amateur world best record of 30.6 seconds for 300 yards in 1926. He claimed in his book Athletics and Training (1938) that Hutchens was the equal of Jesse Owens. Hutchens was described by Harold Abrahams, the 1924 Olympic 100m champion as "the Jesse Owens of his day." Owens' best time for 100 yards was 9.4 seconds.
