= Arthur Postle =

Australian sprinter

Personal information
- Nickname(s): The Crimson Flash, The Mighty Postle, The 13th A. Postle
- Nationality: Australian
- Born: 8 March 1881 Springside near Beauaraba (later Pittsworth) on the Darling Downs, Queensland.
- Died: 21 April 1965 (aged 84) Brisbane, Australia
- Height: 5.10 ft (61.2 in)
- Weight: 11.71 st (74.4 kg)

Sport
- Sport: Track and field
- Event: Sprints

Arthur Benjamin Postle (8 March 1881 – 21 April 1965) was an Australian professional athlete, one of the country's most renowned sprinters in the early twentieth century. Born in Queensland and becoming a professional runner in 1902, Postle rose to prominence for the defeat of Beauchamp Day – then an Irish world champion – at Kalgoorlie in Western Australia in December 1906. Known thereafter as 'The Crimson Flash' for his coloured running costume, Postle also acquired the moniker "The Mighty Postle" for his defeat of Bill Growcott two years later in England, Growcott being England's champion runner. Postle's career took him throughout the United Kingdom and to New Zealand as well as across Australia, where he had a rivalry with fellow Australian champion Jack Donaldson.

Postle set world records for fifty, sixty, seventy-five, eighty and two-hundred yard sprints during his career, which ended in 1913 a year after his marriage to an Englishwoman. He ventured into business, and then became a farmer until full-retirement during the Second World War. He had four children who all survived him upon his death in Brisbane. Edward Seldon Sears wrote that Postle, together with Donaldson, had "few peers among sprinters of their day" and since his retirement he has been considered one of "the greatest of all Australian runners".

== Early life ==
Postle was born in Springside near Pittsworth, in the Darling Downs of the Australian state of Queensland. Part of a large family, Postle was the second-oldest of nine children for Arthur Benjamin Postle Snr. and Frances Postle, née Honor. Postle's father was born in Melbourne, while his mother was English.

Postle was schooled at Springside State School, starting there in 1888. He showed much promise as a runner from early on in his career, and after leaving education in 1893 to work on his father's farm he continued to compete in local athletics tournaments. For one, he needed to catch an early morning train, which he missed. He nevertheless decided to walk the distance to the track, which took him all day.

His father disapproved of Postle's running aspirations; the family farm struggled constantly against drought. Postle was coached instead by his uncle who owned a farm next door on which he had cut a running track. After years work on his father's farm, Postle left to pursue his athletic career in 1899, while his brothers all remained to continue farming.

== Professional career ==
Postle's early, unsuccessful, attempts in the Stawell Gift in 1901 and 1903 garnered for him some local notoriety, and he became a professional runner in 1902. His training focused largely on his technique at the start of his run. He used an unusual starting technique, with his left side prominent and his fingers spread wide. He "emphasised rhythmical breathing during springing, followed his sessions with cold showers, employed an experienced masseur who used oil... and took iron tonic occasionally and castor oil". Postle adhered to a strict diet – foods with high fat contents including milk, eggs and steak – largely based on experience rather than scientific research, which was minimal at the time. He was victorious in games held at Charters Towers and Townsville in the winter of 1904–05, becoming "unbeatable up to eighty yards". In April 1905 he won one-hundred and thirty and four-hundred and forty yard sprints at Bendigo, and in June he was victorious in a one-hundred yard run in Sydney. He returned to Townsville in September to come second in a seventy-five-yard sprint; he went back to Charters Towers in October and won prize money for his racing – equivalent to 130 Pound Sterling; he won £75 more in January, and twice again in February 1906, across several races. His later defeat of South African Reggie Walker brought him a diamond-encrusted necklace.

Old Kalgoorlieites who throw their minds back to April, 1907, when the big pedestrian meetings were held at Kalgoorlie, will remember the deeds of the Australian wonder; anyone who saw the great match on the Boulder racecourse between Postle and the champion Irish runner, Beauchamp Day, would agree that Postle was a marvel among the spike-footed brigade ... It was a clinking start and the Irishman led for most of the way. Fifty yards from home Postle caught his opponent and came on to snatch the verdict.

— The Perth's Mirror on Postle's defeat of Day at Kalgoorlie.

In 1906, in front of a 20,000-strong crowd at Kalgoorlie gold mine, Postle defeated Beauchamp Day, a champion Irish runner sponsored by promoter Rufus Naylor, in a seventy-five-yard spring. Postle's 7.20-second time was a new world record, and his achievements attracted athlete Jack Todd who became Postle's coach. He returned to the event a year later in 1907 and, being beaten in the semi-final unexpectedly by J. Condon, immediately proceeded to jump the perimeter fence and run to a local bookmakers to place money on Condon winning the final, an event which passed into folklore and is remembered often in Australian sprinting.

In 1908, at Durban Postle ran fifty yards in 5.20 seconds, another record, and later the same year he set yet another world record, running sixty yards in 6.1 seconds. His defeat of Bill Growcott in England, and his trademark crimson running gear, earned him the nicknames 'The Mighty Postle' and 'The Crimson Flash'. The Albany Advertiser recalled in 1937 that "he was always smartly attired in bright red silk singlet and knickers" which led to the latter moniker. He also opted to use a number of emblems to represent his nationality, in an era before standardised colours and emblems were used by Australian sportsmen. In addition to his crimson vest he wore green shorts with gold trim, and his shirt had an emu and a kangaroo, one on each breast.

As Postle's notoriety grew, a rivalry began between Jack Donaldson – a prolific Australian sprinter nicknamed 'Blue Streak' – and himself. Postle and American runner Charles Holway challenged Donaldson to a race at Johannesburg in February 1910 to decide who would be crowned World Champion over a one-hundred yard sprint. Though Postle began quickest, he was overtaken by Donaldson at eighty yards and the latter was victorious by 2.4 yards. Postle and Donaldson continued their rivalry, with the former dominating shorter sprints and the latter commanding the one-hundred yard runs – aside from on one occasion in 1912 when Postle defeated his rival in runs of seventy-five, one-hundred and fifty and two-hundred yard springs, setting new world records for the latter. Their record head-to-head would eventually lie at 15:6 in favour of Donaldson. Postle would also rival with Holway himself, and challenged him to several head-to-head races during his career.

In October 1912, Postle married an Englishwoman, Edna Leadbeater, in Lancashire, England. Leadbeater was the sister-in-law of Postle's old coach, Todd. The couple would go on to have four children.

== Later life ==
After retiring from running in 1913, Postle owned an auctioneering business in Memerambi, ran a running-shoe shop, and then traded second-hand goods in Gympie. He failed as a trader in the markets of South Brisbane and became a farmer in Coopers Plains. Through the 1930s he published his autobiography, The Crimson Flash, in weekly instalments in The Sporting Globe, a Melbourne newspaper. The pieces would go on to be collated into a published autobiography edited by Gary Parker in 1995.

His mother died in 1937, and his father twelve months later. During the Second World War he sold the farm and retired to Wynnum, though he continued to coach runners well into the 1950s. He was still a regular at local running tracks, sharing his expertise with young runners. He coached Norma Croker, later an Olympic gold medal winner. He fell ill on 21 April 1965 and died in an ambulance. Streets in Brisbane and Canberra were named after him, as is a seventy-meter sprint run every year at Stawell Gift in his honour. He was inducted into the Sports Australia Hall of Fame in 1985.
