= Jack Donaldson (athlete) =

Australian runner (1886–1933)

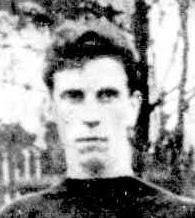
Jack Donaldson 1908

John Donaldson, Jr., (16 March 1886 – 1 September 1933), better known as Jack, was a professional sprinter in the early part of the 1900s. He held various world sprinting records ranging from 100 yards to 400 yards, some of which stood for many years.

== Early life ==
Jack Donaldson was born in Raywood in central Victoria on 16 March 1886. His father, Jack snr, led a somewhat nomadic life consisting of mining in Tarnagulla, farming in Raywood, and publican in Kerang, before finally moving to Inglewood as proprietor of the Pelican Hotel, when Jack jnr was still quite young.

Growing up in Inglewood, Donaldson, along with his brothers Don, Frank and Dick were prominent athletes and footballers. Lacking any professional training, Donaldson was easily able to beat all comers by the turn of the century.

== Professional career ==
In 1906, aged 20, Donaldson started as favourite in the Stawell Gift with a handicap of 13 yards, but after breaking he was penalised one yard, then was narrowly beaten by E W Thompson.

Donaldson was one of the rare professional athletes in the world at that time. With his stride of 8 ft 4 in and from his humble beginnings in Inglewood, he skyrocketed to world fame with six world records in distances from 100 yards to 400 yards. He travelled to London, New York and South Africa to compete in exhibition races. He was nicknamed the 'Blue Streak' due to his blue running singlet with a large white 'A'.

At Johannesburg, South Africa, on 12 February 1910, he established a world record of 9 3/8 seconds for the 100 yard dash. It was 38 years before American Mal Patton reduced that time.

Between his overseas tours Jack often returned to Inglewood to be with his family, and at Bendigo in 1911, he competed in a series of footraces against Arthur Postle of Queensland. Postle won the 75 yard dash, but Donaldson won the 130 yard, 220 yard and 440 yard races.

He created yet another world record in beating an American opponent (Charles Holway) at the Sydney Sports Ground on 23 September 1911, a record that stood until 1951. The covering of 130 yards in 12 seconds is generally regarded as Donaldson's most notable performance.

In 1912, Donaldson ran against fellow Australian, Arthur Postle and South African, Reggie E Walker at the Salford Football Ground, Manchester for the World Championships over 100 yards, with Donaldson winning in a time of 9 & 3/4 seconds.

Jack Donaldson was off scratch in the 1913, 1914, 1915, and 1916 130 yards Powderhall Gift but never won the event.

Donaldson won the 300 yards Handicap event at Powderhall, off scratch in 1915.

== Post-professional career ==
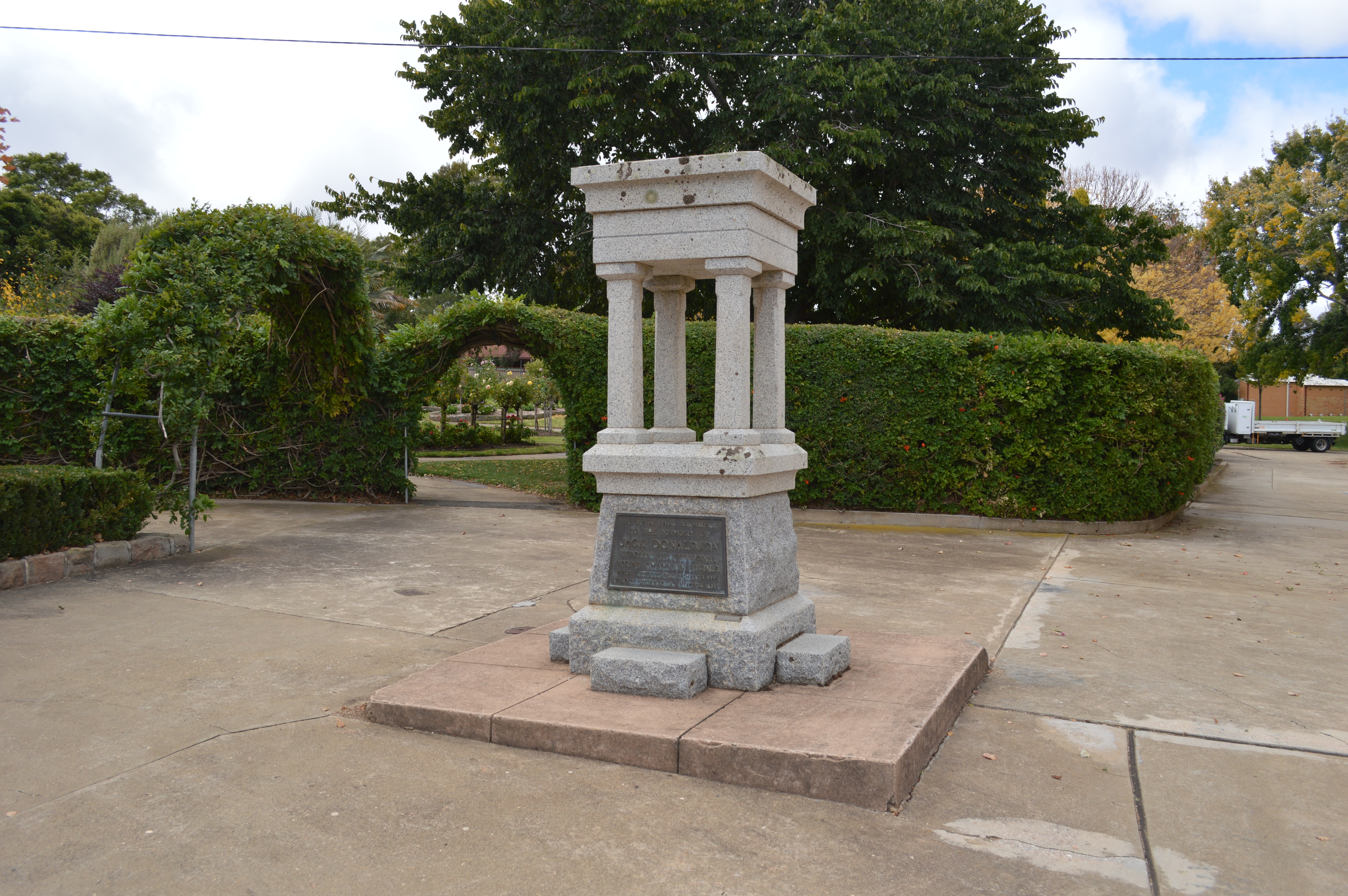
A drinking fountain dedicated to the memory of Jack Donaldson at Central Park in Stawell, Victoria – the home of the Stawell Gift.

After retiring from sprinting, Donaldson operated a gymnasium in Inglewood. There are stories about his training methods on the local football ground where, before crowds of cheering locals, he would race after the town's fastest greyhounds, catching them and returning them to their owners.

In 1919, Donaldson moved to New York where he operated a gymnasium and in the mid 1920s he worked for Wannemaker's, selling golf material.

Donaldson died in New York City on 1 September 1933, apparently of heart failure.

== World records ==
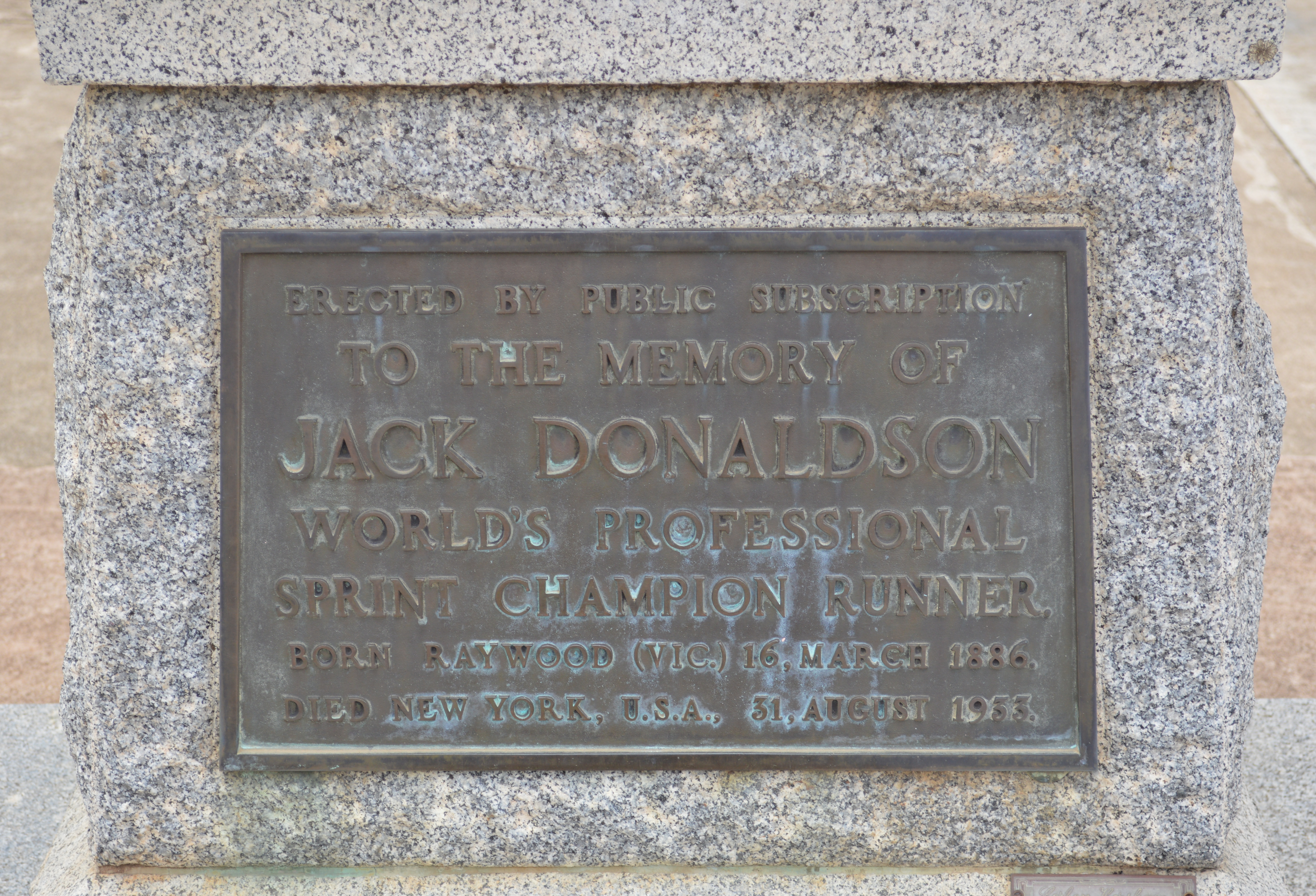
Central Park, Stawell. Jack Donaldson Memorial Plaque

Holding many world records during his career, Donaldson's most enduring marks were:

- 100 yards: in 9 & 3/8 seconds (set at Johannesburg, April 1910) which stood until 1948 when broken by American, Mel Patton.
- 100 yards: in 9 & 4/5ths seconds (set Melbourne, 1911) A world record for a grass track.
- 120 yards: in 11 & 1/4 seconds (set at Pretoria, South Africa, 1909),
- 130 yards: in 12 seconds (set at Sydney, 1911), which stood until 1951 when broken by ?
- 220 yards: 21 & 1/4 seconds (set in Glasgow, 2013)
- 400 yards: in 44 & 3/5 seconds (set at ?)
- 600 yards: in 1 minute, 12 & 1/5 seconds (set at Johannesburg, 1909), which stood until 1931 when broken by Jack Fitt.

== Footnotes ==
'Back to Inglewood 2004', Howard Rochester
