= Ron Wilson (Australian footballer) =

Australian rules footballer (1915–1984)

Personal information
- Full name: Ron Wilson
- Born: 5 June 1915
- Died: 20 September 1984 (aged 69)
- Original team: Donald
- Height: 180 cm (5 ft 11 in)
- Weight: 84 kg (185 lb)

Playing career^{1}
Years	Club	Games (Goals)
1934	Melbourne	1 (0)
1937–40, 1945	St Kilda	58 (6)
1941, 1945-50	Coburg	105 (52)
1950–55	Sorrento	60 (?)
Total		224 (58)
- ^{1} Playing statistics correct to the end of 1955.

Career highlights
- 1936 Dandenong Gift; 1937 Wangaratta Gift; 1938 Whorouly Gift; 1945 Maryborough Gift; 1945 Croydon Gift; 1953 Mornington Peninsula FL Premiership: Sorrento FC

Ron Wilson (5 June 1915 – 20 September 1984) was an Australian rules footballer who played with Melbourne and St Kilda in the Victorian Football League (VFL).

He also played for Victorian Football Association club Coburg, crossing without a clearance in 1941 during the throw-pass era.

Wilson returned to St Kilda in 1945 after his suspension for crossing without a clearance had expired. Wilson then returned to Coburg for the second half of the 1945 VFA season.

Wilson was captain-coach of Coburg in 1947.

Wilson's father, Arnie Wilson played for St Kilda in 1909 and 1910.

== Professional Running ==
Wilson was a very accomplished athlete and won a number of sprint running events. Wilson was an early favorite for the 1936 and 1939 Stawell Gift, but was unplaced in the 1936 semi final and finished 5th in the 1939 final.
