= Eric Cumming =

Australian rules footballer

Personal information
- Full name: Eric James Cumming
- Born: 23 December 1923; Alexandra, Victoria
- Died: 23 February 1964 (aged 40); Ballarat, Victoria
- Original team: Acheron Valley
- Height: 178 cm (5 ft 10 in)
- Weight: 86 kg (190 lb)

Playing career^{1}
Years	Club	Games (Goals)
1948–49	Footscray	14 (2)
- ^{1} Playing statistics correct to the end of 1949.

Career highlights
- 1947 Upper Gouburn FL Premiership: Acheron Valley FC; 1947 - Acheron Valley FC: best & fairest; 1947 - Leongatha Gift; 1948 - Stawell Axeman's Gift; 1948 - Maribynong Gift; 1948, 49, 50 & 51 - Benalla Gift; 1948 & 1951 Whorouly Gift; 1950 - Horsham Gift; 1951 - Footscray Gift; 1952 - Powderhall Gift; 1952 - Burnie Gift; 1952 - Burramine Gift; 1952 - Molyullah Gift

Eric James Cumming (23 December 1923 – 23 February 1964) was an Australian rules footballer who played with Footscray in the Victorian Football League (VFL) and a professional sprinter during the late 1940s and early 1950's.

== Family ==
The son of Eric James Cumming (1890–1955), and Eleanor Jane "Ella" Cumming (1894–1986), née McKenzie, Eric James Cumming was born at Alexandra, Victoria on 23 December 1923.

He married Isabelle Woolley (1927–2015) on 19 June 1954.

== Military service ==
Prior to his sporting exploits, Cumming enlisted in the Second AIF as a 19 year old in 1943, serving until the end of World War II in 1946.

== Football ==
In 1946, Cumming caught the attention of Essendon and trained with them in late April 1946. Cumming played in Acheron Valley's 1947 Upper Goulburn Football League premiership win against Thornton prior to playing with Footscray.

Cumming spent two seasons at Footscray, who were captain-coached by Arthur Olliver. He played eight games in the 1948 VFL season, including a Semi Final, which Footscray lost to Collingwood.

He played in six games in 1949, kicking his only career goals (two) in the match against Fitzroy, at the Brunswick Street Oval, on 21 May 1949. He sustained a serious thigh injury in the match against Collingwood, at Victoria Park, on 20 August 1949; he did not play football again.

During his time at Footscray, Cumming was also studying at Melbourne University's Dookie College campus.

== Professional athletics ==
A professional sprinter, Cumming won the Whorouly Gift in 1948 and 1951.

Cumming won four consecutive Benalla Gifts between 1948 and 1951.

In a four week period in February 1951, Cumming won four consecutive gifts, winning at Footscray, Whorouly, Seymour and Benalla.

Cumming competed in the Powderhall Gift Scotland in 1951 and 1952 and in 1951 Cumming (off 2 yards) was just beaten by an inch by eventual winner, Geoff Harrington (off 7.5 yards) in the semi final.

Cumming left Australia by ship in April 1951 to prepare for the 1952 Powderhall Gift and he became the first and only Australian to win the prestigious New Year Sprint at Powderhall Scotland. With a handicap of two yards, Cumming won the 130 yard race in 12.19 seconds, becoming the first overseas athlete to win the famous race.

1951 Powderhall Gift winner, Geoff Harrington stated in an article in 2015, that Eric Cumming was the greatest sprinter he had ever seen up until Usain Bolt arrived on the world running circuit in the early 2000's.

He also regularly competed in the Stawell Gift and finished second in 1946, behind Tommy Deane after being one of the pre race favourites.

In September 1952, Cumming won the Sheaf toss at the Melbourne Show.

== Death ==
He died 'suddenly' at Ballarat on 23 February 1964, aged 40 years old after a caber toss at a Highland gathering.

== Recognition ==
In recognition of his contribution to professional running, the Stawell Athletic Club awards the most successful sprinter over 70 m, 120 m, and 200 m, at its Stawell Gift carnival, the Eric Cumming trophy.
